= Stand-Up India =

Indian government scheme to promote entrepreneurship

- Country: India
- Prime Minister(s): Narendra Modi
- Launched: 5 April 2016; 10 years ago
- Website: www.standupmitra.in

Stand-Up India was launched by the Government of India on 5 April 2016 to support entrepreneurship among women and SC & ST communities.The scheme aims to provide loans between Rs.10 lakhs and Rs.1 crore for setting up a greenfield enterprise in manufacturing, trading or services sector.

It is similar to but distinct from Startup India. Both are enablers and beneficiaries of other Government of India schemes, such as Make in India, Industrial corridor, Dedicated Freight Corridor, Sagarmala, Bharatmala, UDAN-RCS, Digital India, BharatNet and UMANG.

== History ==
Prime Minister Narendra Modi launched the Stand-Up India scheme on 5 April 2016 as part of the government's efforts to support entrepreneurship among women and SC & ST communities.

The scheme offers bank loans of between ₹10 lakh (US$11,000) and ₹1 crore (US$110,000) for scheduled castes and scheduled tribes and women setting up new enterprises outside of the farm sector.

In April 2023, Bhagwat Karad, the Union Minister of State for Finance, Government of India, said that the scheme aligned with the National Mission for Financial Inclusion's objective of providing funding opportunities to marginalized groups. He said that over the previous seven years, more than 180,000 entrepreneurs had benefited from the scheme, and that of loans granted through the initiative, over 80% had been directed towards women entrepreneurs.

== See also ==
- Khadi
- Khadi and Village Industries Commission
- Ministry of Micro, Small and Medium Enterprises
- Mahatma Gandhi Institute for Rural Industrialization
- National Charkha Museum
- National Handloom Day of India
- Make In India
- Swadeshi Jagaran Manch
- Swaraj
