= Udyam Registration =

Government registration system for Indian MSMEs

Agency overview
- Formed: July 2020; 6 years ago
- Preceding agency: Udyog Aadhaar (2015–2030)
- Jurisdiction: Government of India
- Headquarters: New Delhi, India
- Minister responsible: Jitan Ram Manjhi, Ministry of Micro, Small and Medium Enterprises
- Parent agency: Ministry of Micro, Small and Medium Enterprises
- Website: udyamregistration.gov.in

Udyam Registration is a government registration system for Micro, Small and Medium Enterprises (MSMEs) in India, introduced by the Ministry of Micro, Small and Medium Enterprises in July 2020. It replaced the earlier Udyog Aadhaar system to streamline compliance and provide MSMEs access to credit, subsidies, and government schemes. As of July 2024, over 4.77 crore MSMEs have registered under the platform.

== History ==
The registration system was first launched in September 2015 as Udyog Aadhaar, a 12-digit identification number for MSMEs. By 2018, over 48 lakh MSMEs had registered.

In June 2020, the Government of India revised MSME classification criteria and replaced Udyog Aadhaar with Udyam Registration under the MSMED Act, 2006. The new system integrated Aadhaar and PAN for digital verification, reducing paperwork.

== Classification of MSMEs ==
Under Udyam, MSMEs are classified as:

Category	Investment	Annual Turnover
Micro	≤ ₹2.5 crore	≤ ₹10 crore
Small	≤ ₹25 crore	≤ ₹100 crore
Medium	≤ ₹125crore	≤ ₹500 crore

== Registration Process ==
Registration is online and requires:

1. Aadhaar of the proprietor/partner/director.

2. PAN of the business.

3. Basic business details (name, address, bank account).

After submission, a certificate with a Udyam Registration Number (URN) and QR code is issued.

== Benefits ==
Registered MSMEs gain access to:

- Collateral-free loans under the CGTMSE scheme.
- Subsidies for ISO certification, electricity bills, and patent filing.
- Protection under the MSMED Act, 2006 against delayed payments.

== Impact ==
As of 2024, Udyam has facilitated ₹15.6 lakh crore in bank credit to MSMEs. A 2023 RBI study noted a 34% increase in MSME lending post-Udyam.

== Challenges ==
- Digital divide: Rural MSMEs face hurdles due to limited internet access.
- Fraudulent registrations: Self-declaration risks misuse.

== Related Initiatives ==
Other MSME portals include:

- MSME Samadhaan: Redressal of delayed payments.
- MSME Sambandh: Monitoring public procurement.
- Champions Portal: Grievance resolution.

== See also ==
- Make in India
- Startup India
- Stand-Up India
- GST Registration
