= State Institute of Engineering & Technology, Nilokheri =

Public Institute in Nilokheri, Karnal

Haryana Institute of Technology, Nilokheri
- राजकीय अभियांत्रिकी एवं प्रौद्योगिकी संस्थान, निलोखेड़ी
- Other names: SIET Nilokheri & GEC NLK
- Former name: Government engineering College (GEC Nilokheri)
- Type: Public Government agency
- Established: 2015
- Affiliations: UGC, AICTE, NEW DELHI, HSBTE, Haryana
- Chairman: Haryana Government; Haryana Technical Education Department
- Director: T. R. Mudgal
- Faculty: 50+
- Students: 900+
- Undergraduates: 900+
- Postgraduates: 0
- Location: Nilokheri, Karnal, Haryana, India; 29°50′N 76°56′E
- Campus: Semi-urban
- Website: Official Website

The State Institute of Engineering & Technology, Nilokheri also known as Haryana Institute of Technology, Nilokheri (formerly Government Engineering College, Nilokheri) (Hindi: राजकीय अभियांत्रिकी एवं प्रौद्योगिकी संस्थान, निलोखेड़ी, abbreviated SIETN) is a public government engineering institution in Nilokheri. It is one of the five engineering higher education Institute run by the Government of Haryana, the others being Ch. Devi Lal State Institute of Engineering & Technology, Sirsa, Rao Bijender Singh State Institute of Engineering & Technology, Rewari, Ch. Ranbir Singh State Institute of Engineering & Technology, Jhajjar and State Institute of Engineering & Technology, Panchkula.

== History ==
The concept of the diploma institute at Nilokheri as an engineering college was first introduced in year 2000. After many initial tries, college was supposed to open in 2010 but due to government and political policy, idea was rejected once again. The institute building was inaugurated by Manohar Lal Khattar, who was the Chief Minister of Haryana on 23 September 2012 which previously being used by the students of Govt. Polytechnic Nilokheri (GPN)'s for attending classes of Diploma Ist year & later were shifted out en bloc to mark the beginning of SIET Nilokheri at its campus in new building. The Guru BrahmaNand Ji Govt. Polytechnic Nilokheri (GBNGPN) is thus the mother institution of GEC Nilokheri. The institute was proposed to upgrade to the Haryana Institute of Technology, Nilokheri by Nayab Singh Saini, the current Chief Minister of Haryana on March 17, 2025.

== Foundation ==
The institute was granted the status of engineering college on 30 April 2016 having named Government Engineering College, Nilokheri which was later changed to State Institute of Engineering & Technology, Nilokheri. The first academic session has start from 16th August, 2016. The institution have best record in placements of 2021 and 2020 batch. Up to 70% of CSE branch students were placed in multinational corporations like TCS, NIIT, etc. Students of this institution show keen interested in open source development, competitive programming, data structure and algorithms, machine learning, artificial intelligence etc.

== Past regular Directors ==
The following is a list of Directors of the State Institute of Engineering & Technology (SIET), Nilokheri since its inception in 2016:

| S.No. | Name | From | To |
|---|---|---|---|
| 1 | Dr. Y.P.S. Berwal (Founder Director) | 8 January 2016 | 22 July 2018 |
| 2 | Dr. A.S. Rathee | 23 July 2018 | 22 November 2018 |
| — | Vacant | 23 November 2018 | 3 January 2019 |
| 3 | Dr. A.S. Rathee | 4 January 2019 | 29 June 2020 |
| 4 | Dr. Krishan Kumar Kataria | 30 June 2020 | 6 March 2024 |
| 5 | Dr. Manish Kumar | 6 March 2024 | 12 June 2024 |
| 6 | Dr. Krishan Kumar Kataria | 13 June 2024 | 31 January 2025 |
| 7 | Dr. T.K. Mudgil | 31 January 2025 | 31 January 2026 |
| 8 | Dr. Prof. Anil Kumar Rose | 31 January 2026 | Present |

== Recognition ==
State Institute of Engineering & Technology, Nilokheri is affiliated to Kurukshetra University and is approved by All India Council of Technical Education, New Delhi (AICTE) and the Department of Technical Education, Govt. of Haryana (DTE). Institution has establish an Internal Quality Assurance Cell (IQAC) as a post-accreditation quality sustenance measure.

== Institutional Collaborations ==
The State Institute of Engineering & Technology (SIET), Nilokheri, maintains formal academic and industrial partnerships through Memorandums of Understanding (MoUs) with various external organizations. These bilateral agreements are structured to enhance the institution's technical ecosystem by facilitating joint research initiatives, faculty development programs, and student internships. By establishing structured frameworks with corporate entities, research laboratories, and allied academic institutions, SIET Nilokheri aims to bridge the gap between traditional engineering curricula and evolving industry standards. These collaborations frequently focus on practical resource-sharing, including access to specialized laboratory infrastructure, expert guest lectures, and coordinated campus placement drives managed via the institution's Training and Placement Cell.

== Admissions ==
Admission in B.Tech. first year is given to students on the basis of their ranks in Joint Entrance Examination-Main. Admission in second year though B.Tech. Lateral Entry scheme is done on basis of B.E./B.Tech Lateral Engineering Entrance Test exam conducted by Haryana State Technical Education Society.

== Departments ==
- Applied Science
- Computer Science & Engineering
- Civil Engineering
- Electrical Engineering
- Electronics & Communication Engineering
- Mechanical Engineering

== Academic programs ==
State Institute of Engineering & Technology, Nilokheri awards undergraduate B.Tech in various engineering fields in a four-year Engineering programme.

| | Discipline | Intake | Full Time\Part Time |
|---|---|---|---|
| 1 | Computer Engineering | 90 | Full Time |
| 2 | Computer Science Engineering (AI & ML) | 30 | Full Time |
| 3 | Electronics and Communication Engineering | 60 | Full Time |
| 4 | Mechanical Engineering | 60 | Full Time |
| 5 | Civil Engineering | 60 | Full Time |
| 6 | Electrical Engineering | 60 | Full Time |

Institute began Masters Post-graduate M.Tech from session 2022-23 onwards. As per the Institute website information available, Mtech will be offered by Computer science engineering and Mechanical engineering department respectively.

| | Discipline | Intake | Full Time\Part Time |
|---|---|---|---|
| 1 | Robotics and Artificial Intelligence | 18 | Full Time |
| 2 | Advanced Manufacturing Technology | 18 | Full Time |

== Student life ==
=== Tech-Kriti Annual Fest ===
The Institute along with its constituent clubs organizes its annual cultural fest Tech-Kriti-Fest. It is a Two-day-long event held in May every year.

=== Ruksat ===
The Institute along with its constituent clubs organizes its farewell program to bid farewell to its final year students.

=== Annual Athletic Meet ===
Annual Athletic Meet is organized since 2017 in the month of March Every Year.

=== Alumni Meet ===
The faculty members & student representative of Alumni Cell, SIET Nilokheri arranages Alumni Meet for former students and organises interactive sessions.

=== Training and Placement Cell ===
Training and Placement (T&P) Cell, has the primary aim of helping students to find Summer training, industry interaction visits, internships and find campus placement after completion of UG & PG academic Programme. It primarily works as a bridge between the industry and the institute. It is a dedicated Cell managing training, internships, and placements under the supervision & Team work of Training and Placement Professor-in-charge Dr. Parveen Kumar Saini.

=== National Service Scheme and NCC ===
This institute also has National Service Scheme for better development of students enriching their overall personality. NCC has been introduced in the college from 21 to 22 session onwards.

== Campus ==
The institute is in Nilokheri, district Karnal, Haryana. It spreads over 360 acres (150 ha). The site has a strategic location in that it is 143 km (89 mi) from National Capital New Delhi and 107 km from state capital Chandigarh on Delhi-Chandighar National Highway (NH-1). It is well connected by road and railway having Nilokheri railway station. The campus is also close to other educational, training and research institutions such as the Govt. Polytechnic Nilokheri, Central Tool Room Extension Center, Nilokheri, Maharana Pratap Horticultural University, National Dairy Research Institute, University Institute of Engineering and Technology, Kurukshetra University, National Institute of Technology, Kurukshetra, Govt. Polytechnic, Umri, National Institute of Design, Kurukshetra, National Institute of Electronics & Information Technology, Kurukshetra and Kalpana Chawla Government Medical College.

== See also ==
- AICTE (AICTE)
- Association of Indian Universities (AIU)
- Education in India
- List of institutions of higher education in Haryana
- List of universities in India
- National Assessment and Accreditation Council (NAAC)
- Universities and colleges in India
