= Ministry of Micro, Small, and Medium Enterprises =

Ministry of Micro, Small, and Medium Enterprises could refer to:

- Ministry of Micro, Small and Medium Enterprises, India
- Ministry of Micro, Small, and Medium Enterprises (Indonesia)
