= Leadership school =

A leadership school is an organization, or entity within an organization, that provides education that focuses on the development of leaders.

This activity can be undertaken at different levels. It can be in the form of training, seminars, institutes, or more comprehensive frameworks that lead to the awarding of a certificate, degree, or diploma. The leadership curriculum is intended to shape leadership behavior, and the approach used in developing the curriculum can vary, depending on the beliefs of the founders. These things potentially make leadership have a rich and broad meaning, which can also make it difficult for people who want to study leadership to find common ground.

== History ==
While theorists and practitioners in the United States in the 19th and early-20th centuries developed the field that they called "management", socialists in Europe founded schools for their prospective leadership cadres. Lenin established the Longjumeau Party School near Paris in 1911 to train Bolshevik leaders. The International Lenin School of the Comintern operated from 1926, training international students in communist theory and operation and its organization.

In the Third Reich (1933-1945) in Germany, the Nazi Party fostered élite schools, among which the National Political Institutes of Education or Napola, the Adolf Hitler Schools and the Reichsschule Feldafing in particular trained prospective National Socialist leaders.

== See also ==
- National School of Leadership
- National Outdoor Leadership School
- Korean Minjok Leadership Academy
- THNK School of Creative Leadership
