= Swadeshi movement =

1905–1947 Indian movement for domestic cloth production

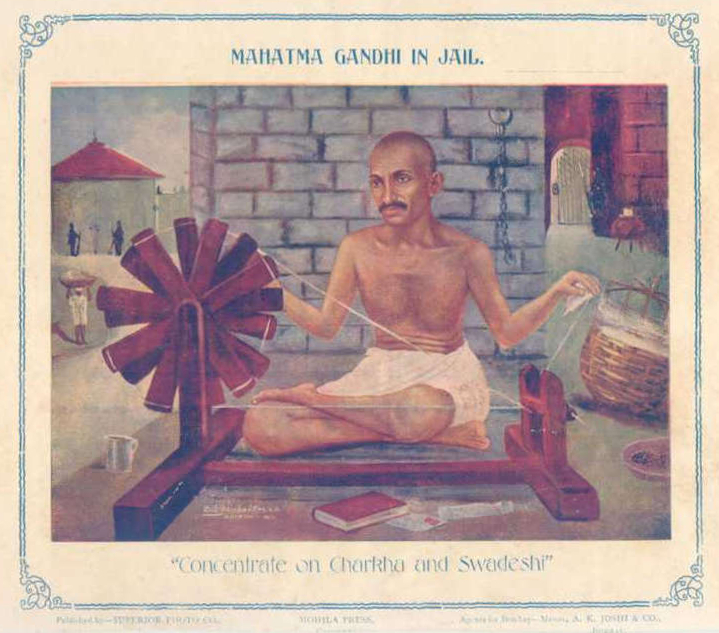
Popular 1930s poster depicting Gandhi using a charkha to spin cotton and weave cloth, captioned "Concentrate on Charkha and Swadeshi"

The Swadeshi movement was a self-sufficiency movement that was part of the Indian independence movement and contributed to the development of Indian nationalism.

After the British government's decision for the partition of Bengal was made public in December 1903, discontent among Indians grew. In response the Swadeshi movement was formally initiated at the Calcutta Town Hall on 7 August 1905 to curb foreign goods by relying on domestic production. Mahatma Gandhi described it as the soul of swaraj (self-rule). The movement grew after rich Indians donated money and land to Khadi and Gramodyog societies, which started cloth production in every household. It also included other village industries so as to make villages self-sufficient and self-reliant.

The Indian National Congress used this movement in its struggle for independence. On 15 August 1947, a hand-spun Khadi tricolor Ashoka Chakra Indian flag was unfurled at Princess Park near India Gate, New Delhi by Jawaharlal Nehru.

The British Raj's decision to partition Bengal was made in December 1903. The official reason was that Bengal, with a population of 78 million, was too large to be administered; the real reason, however, was that it was the centre of a revolt, and British officials could not control the protests, which they thought would spread throughout India. The Viceroy of India, George Curzon, 1st Marquess Curzon of Kedleston, presided over the 1905 partition of Bengal. In his 2004 book The Lion and the Tiger: The Rise and Fall of the British Raj, 1600–1947, Denis Judd wrote:

Curzon had hoped ... to bind India permanently to the Raj. Ironically, his partition of Bengal, and the bitter controversy that followed, did much to revitalize Congress. Curzon, typically, had dismissed the Congress in 1900 as 'tottering to its fall'. But he left India with Congress more active and effective than at any time in its history.

Bengal was divided by religion: the western half would be primarily Hindu, and the eastern half would be primarily Muslim. This divide-and-conquer strategy sparked the Swadeshi movement. The British reunited Bengal in 1911 and shifted the capital to New Delhi. The Swadeshi movement took on a new meaning after the reunification of Bengal.

== Etymology ==
Swadeshi is a conjunction (sandhi) of two Sanskrit words: swa ("self" or "own") and desh ("country"). Swadeshi is an adjective that means "of one's own country".

== Timeline ==
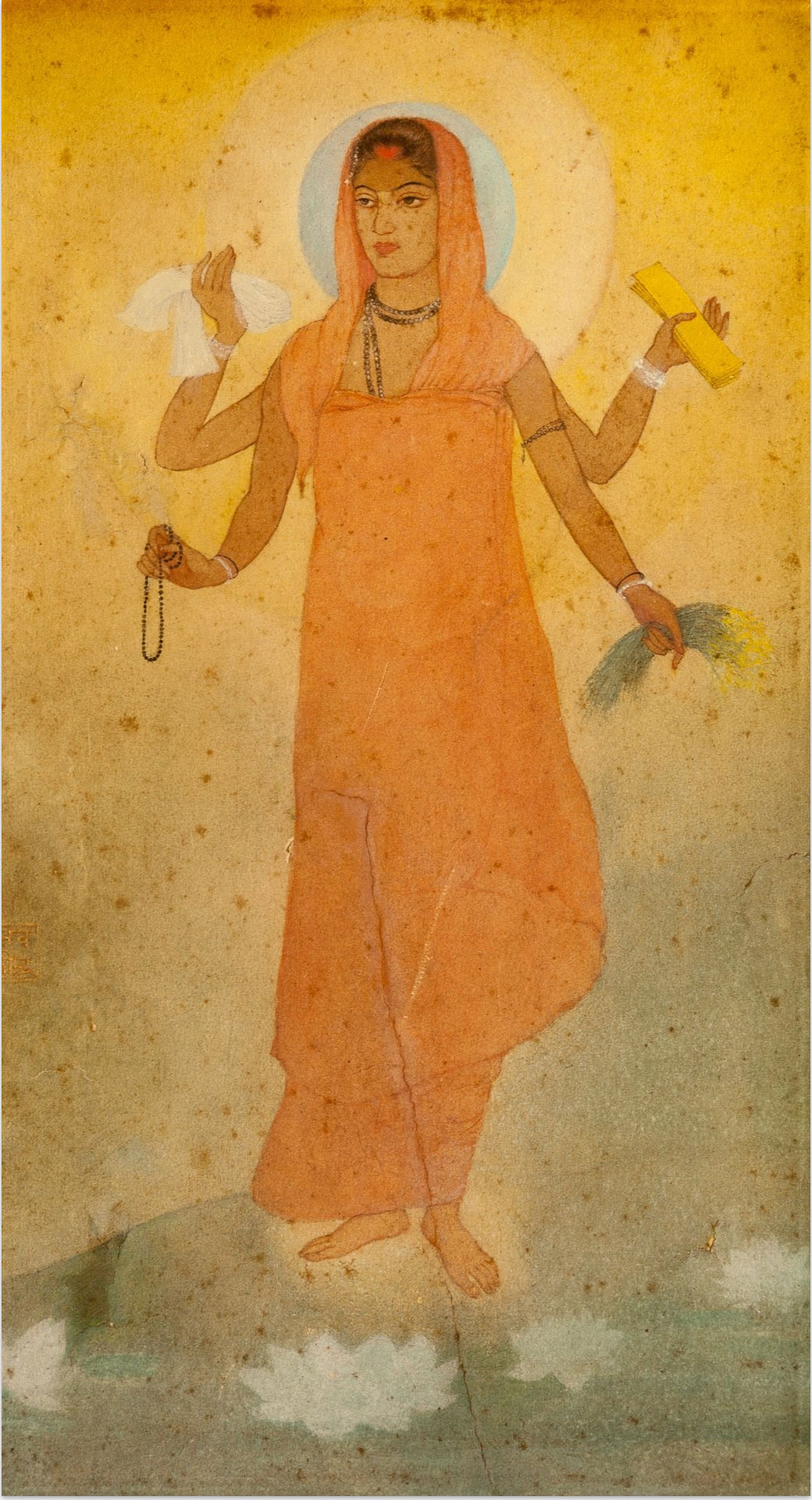
Bharat Mata, 1905 painting by Abanindranath Tagore, one of the earliest visualisations of Bharat Mata, or "Mother India"

The Swadeshi Movement was a cornerstone of India's struggle for independence, emphasising self-reliance, indigenous production, and economic resistance to British colonial rule. It evolved through multiple phases across different historical contexts, each marked by distinct strategies, leaders, and national goals. Each stage reflects how the idea of Swadeshi has transformed—from a boycott movement into a broader vision of national self-reliance and economic sovereignty.

- First Swadeshi Movement (1850–1918): Dadabhai Naoroji, Gopal Krishna Gokhale, Mahadev Govind Ranade, Bal Gangadhar Tilak, Ganesh Vyankatesh Joshi, Bhaswat K. Nigoni, V.O. Chidambaram Pillai, Subramaniya Bharathi, Subramaniya Siva and Ram Singh Kuka led the movement . Bal Gangadhar Tilak led Ganesh Utsav as a means to popularise use and consumption of indigenous products from soil to sweets in 1893.Namdhari Sikhs boycotted English cloths, education and courts and instead promoted hand spun cloths 'khaddar', vernacular education and khap panchayats in 1871-1872.V. O. Chidambaram Pillai in Tuticorin took over British India Steam Navigation Company and converted it into Indian-owned shipping company and named it Swadeshi Shipping Company in October 1906. The trio of Lal-Bal-Pal actively organised numerous samitis during the Swadeshi movement but became inactive after 1908 due to deportations and arrests.
- Second Swadeshi Movement (1918–1947): The movement gained further momentum in 1918 when Mahatma Gandhi introduced the Patti Charkha in Mumbai, presenting it as a new symbol and tool of the Swadeshi movement and took a pledge to boycott foreign goods by burning 150,000 English cloths at Elpinstone Mill Compound, Parel, Mumbai on 31 July 1921. Mahatma Gandhi organised Khadi spinning centres all over the country and branded Khadi spinners as freedom fighters. Indians started ditching British goods for Indian products, even though they were costlier. The impact was strong with British seeing 20% fall in its product sales.
- Third Swadeshi Movement (1947–1991): The Indian government under Nehruvian socialism and successive prime ministers focused on import substitution, public sector expansion, and protectionist policies to promote Indian self-reliance leading to the establishment of heavy industries, scientific institutions, and a planned economy aimed at economic sovereignty. In the post-independence era, the Rashtriya Swayamsevak Sangh and its many affiliates have also adopted Swadeshi as their central economic principle, although they have not always advocated for protectionism and cutting off the processes of globalisation.
- Fourth Swadeshi Movement (1991–present): Initiated by Prime Minister P.V. Narasimha Rao with Finance Minister Dr. Manmohan Singh shifted to liberalisation, privatisation, and globalisation—encouraging Indian businesses to become globally competitive which impacted a marked new Swadeshi phase where Indian entrepreneurs like Infosys, Wipro, and Tata emerged as global players while opening the economy. Since 2014, led by PM Narendra Modi through campaigns like Make in India, Atmanirbhar Bharat, and Vocal for Local emphasised manufacturing within India, reducing foreign dependence, and promoting indigenous startups and MSMEs which revitalised public discourse around economic nationalism and Swadeshi values through digital platforms and policy reforms.

== Influence ==
- The intellectual roots of the Swadeshi movement can be traced to the economic critiques of Dadabhai Naoroji, particularly his 1876 work Poverty of India, where he introduced the concept of the "Drain Theory", arguing that British colonial rule led to the systematic extraction of wealth from India. His analysis provided a foundation for the economic nationalism that would later fuel Swadeshi sentiment. Naoroji expanded upon these arguments in his book Poverty and Un-British Rule in India (1901). His election to the British House of Commons from (1892–1895) as a Liberal Party (UK) Member of Parliament for Finsbury Central marked a significant moment in Indian political history, as he brought these economic grievances directly to the attention of British lawmakers. Naoroji's work played a pivotal role in shaping early nationalist thought, contributing to the ideological basis for the Swadeshi movement, which emerged in the early twentieth century as a campaign to boycott British goods and promote indigenous industry.
- Mahatma Gandhi's promotion of Swadeshi in later years, promoting self-reliance and boycotting foreign goods, boosted Indian-made cloth sales to 62% by 1936 and 76% by 1945. His charkha initiative sought to make the locals self-reliant in spinning yarn, challenging British economic control to fight colonial structure.
- Swadeshi movement forms the backdrop of the novel Ghare Baire (The Home and the World), published in 1916, by Rabindranath Tagore. The novel, besides many other complex themes, shows the pitfalls of fervent nationalism. The 1984 film Ghare Baire (The Home and the World) by Satyajit Ray is based on the novel.
- In 1982 the movie Gandhi by Richard Attenborough, Indians vow on the bonfire of English cloths to wear swadeshi khadi after Gandhi's speech at Elphinstone Fort, Mumbai.
- According to a 1999 article, E. F. Schumacher (author of Small Is Beautiful) was influenced by Gandhi's concept of Swadeshi.
- On 7 August 2015, Prime Minister Narendra Modi commemorated the first annual National Handloom Day in India to promote indigenous handloom and khadi products. The date was chosen because on 7 August 1905, the Swadeshi movement was proclaimed to avoid foreign goods and use only Indian-made products.
- In 2019 the movie Manikarnika: The Queen of Jhansi (film) by Kangana Ranaut on the Queen, who fought valiantly against English in 1857, extensively used khadi (hand spun fabrics) made of cotton, brocade and paithani to mark the spirit of swadeshi. Prior to becoming the Queen, the historical figure learned how to made the fabric.
- In July 2020 Tooter is a new social media platform that was launched which is a cross-over between Facebook and Twitter. The social media platform has now garnered attention for calling itself the Swadeshi Andolan 2.0.
- On 18 August 2020 IT minister Ravi Shankar Prasad on Tuesday announced Swadeshi Microprocessor Challenge with award money of Rs 4.3 crore to key challenges after a ban on Chinese investments.
- On 17 July 2021 at the 18th Investiture Ceremony of the Border Security Force (BSF), Home Minister Amit Shah said that the Defence Research and Development Organisation (DRDO) and other agencies are working on an anti-drone swadeshi technology to deal with this danger of "Smuggling of drugs, arms, and explosives by drones has become a major challenge".
- On 25 July 2021 Prime Minister Narendra Modi addressed the nation through the 79th episode of his monthly radio programme Mann Ki Baat encouraging the people to buy Indian arts and crafts and attributed the increase in sales of khadi to its Indian patrons. "To buy khadi is to serve the people and the country #myhandloommypride should be used when you buy and post it online." He also reminded the celebration of National Handloom Day on 7 August "When the Swadeshi movement was launched years ago, many of our artisans were associated with it."
- On 28 July 2021 Bangalore based GoCoop, India's first online marketplace for artisans and weavers is hosted Go Swadeshi, an exhibition showcasing handcrafted weaves from 30,000+ artisans, 12,000+ woman showcasing their largest collection of handmade textiles from India with over 70,000 products across sarees, other clothing, accessories, home furnishings and fabrics. In 2015, GoCoop was the winner of India's first National Award for Handlooms marketing (eCommerce) 2015.

== See also ==
- Autarky – A country, state, or society that is economically independent
- Continental Association
- Juche – The North Korean philosophy of self-reliance
- Khadi and Village Industries Commission
- National Charkha Museum
- Rajiv Dixit
- Sarvodaya
- Self-determination
- Stand-Up India
- Swadeshi Jagaran Manch
