= Nilokheri =

- Town
- Location in Haryana, India Nilokheri (India)
- Coordinates: 29.83°N 76.92°E
- Country: India
- State: Haryana
- District: Karnal
- Elevation: 237 m (778 ft)

Population (2011)
  - Total: 16,405

Languages
  - Official: Hindi
- Time zone: UTC+5:30 (IST)
- PIN: 132117
- Telephone code: +91-01745-XXXXXX
- Vehicle registration: HR
- Sex Ratio: 904:1000 ♂/♀
- Website: nilokheri.org

Nilokheri is a town, just 19 km from Karnal city and a municipal committee in Karnal district in the Indian state of Haryana. It has 13 wards. The town is located about 143 km from Delhi on National Highway 44.

== Demographics ==
Religion in Nilokheri (2011)
| Religion | Percent |
| Hinduism | 81.58% |
| Sikhism | 16.26% |
| Christianity | 1.17% |
| Islam | 0.84% |
| Others (Note: Including Jainism, Buddhism, Zoroastrianism, Judaism, others, or no religion) | 0.15% |

As of 2011 India census"Office of the Registrar General & Census Commissioner, India" (PDF). Office of the Registrar General & Census Commissioner, India. 2 April 2018., Nilokheri had a population of 16,405. Males constitute 52% of the population and females 48%. Nilokheri has an average literacy rate of 73%, higher than the national average of 59.5%: male literacy is 77%, and female literacy is 69%. In Nilokheri, 13% of the population is under 6 years of age.

== Administration ==
Nilokheri is a town and a municipal committee in Karnal district in the Indian state of Haryana . Nilokheri has a polling strength of 12517.

== Education ==
=== Academic Technical Learning Institute ===
- Guru BrahamaNand Ji Govt. Polytechnic Institute Nilokheri
- State Institute of Engineering & Technology, Nilokheri
- Central Tool Room Extension Centre, Nilokheri earlier functional as Integrated Training Centre, Nilokheri now affiliated to Ministry of Micro, Small and Medium Enterprises
- Maharana Pratap Horticultural University, Karnal
- Kalpana Chawla Government Medical College, Karnal
- Kalpana Chawla University of Health Sciences, Karnal
- National Dairy Research Institute, Karnal
- Govt. Polytechnic, Umri
- Kurukshetra University, Kurukshetra
- National Institute of Technology, Kurukshetra
- National Institute of Design, Kurukshetra
- National Institute of Electronics & Information Technology, Kurukshetra

=== Other Government offices, institutions and organisations ===
==== Government Organisation ====
- Government of India Press, Nilokheri.
- Post Office Nilokheri (Sub Office), Karnal, Haryana HR), India (IN), Pin Code:- 132117.
- BSNL, Nilokheri (Sub Office ) state-owned telecommunications company .
- Agro Engineering Workshop, Nilokheri was set up in 1968-1969. It is a unit of Haryana Agro Industries Corporation Limited (A Government of Haryana Undertaking).
- Haryana State Cooperative Supply and Marketing Federation Ltd (HAFED) was set up on 1 November 1966. One of the largest apex cooperative federation of Government of Haryana.

=== Primary and secondary schools ===
==== Govt. Schools ====
- Government Senior Secondary School, Nilokheri affiliated to Haryana Board of School Education Bhiwani,

==== Pvt. Schools ====
- D.A.V. Centenary Public School, Nilokheri, affiliated to Central Board of Secondary Education, founded 1989.
- S.D.M.N. Vidya Mandir Sr. Secondary School affiliated to Central Board of Secondary Education

== Geography ==
Nilokheri is located at 29.83°N 76.92°E. It has an average elevation of 237 metres (830 feet).
