= Govt. Polytechnic Nilokheri =

Coordinates: 29.8372126°N 76.9355775°E

Guru Brahmanand Ji Govt. Polytechnic Institute Nilokheri
- Govt. Polytechnic Institute Nilokheri
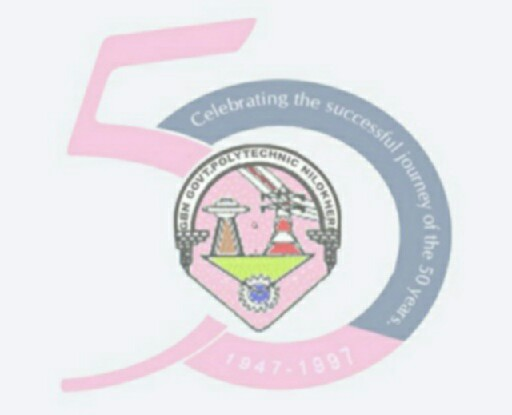
- Govt. Polytechnic, Nilokheri; Golden Jubilee Logo
- Former names: Govt. Polytechnic Nilokheri / Punjab Polytechnic, Nilokheri / Govt. school of Engg, Rasool
- Motto: Provide Technical Education to All
- Type: Government agency
- Established: 23 September 1947 Incumbency Board
- Accreditation: AICTE, New Delhi
- Academic affiliations: Haryana State Board of Technical Education
- Principal: Ms. Binu Bajaj
- Students: c. 729
- Location: Nilokheri, Haryana, India
- Campus: 31,577.92 m^{2} (339,901.9 sq ft)
- Colours: Grey & black
- Website: www.gpnilokheri.ac.in

Guru Brahmanand Ji Govt. Polytechnic Institute Nilokheri is a co-educational institution of higher learning located in the town of Nilokheri in the Karnal region of Haryana. It is one of the best institution in the polytechnic list of institutions of higher education in Haryana. The institute was established in 1947, by Govt. of India. It was re-established in 1951 is affiliated with the Haryana State Board of Technical Education (HSBTE), Panchkula and approved by All India Council of Technical Education, New Delhi (AICTE) and the Department of Technical Education, Govt. of Haryana (DTE). It is one of the best in North India. Diploma holders from this institute serve in various government organizations and institutions all over India.

== History ==
The Guru BrahmaNand Ji Govt. Polytechnic Institute Nilokheri is one of the premier Technical Institutions in the country with an international repute. This was the first polytechnic to be set up in North India, and continues to get 100 per cent placement for its students. The institute is situated at a distance of 143 km. from Delhi on National Highway-I towards north. This Institute was originally located at Rasool (West Punjab) as Govt. school of Engg. After partition, it was shifted to Chhachhrauli (District. Yamunanagar) and subsequently to Nilokheri in 1951. Nilokheri Polytechnic, Nilokheri established by the Govt. of India in 1947, was already in existence. Both these institutes kept running simultaneously till 1958 when these were merged on recommendation of Govt. of India and named as Punjab Polytechnic, Nilokheri with the reorganizing of the State on 1 November 1966, this institute was renamed as Haryana Polytechnic, Nilokheri, it was again renamed as Govt. Polytechnic Nilokheri, and recently it is renamed as Guru BrahmaNand Ji Govt. Polytechnic Institute Nilokheri. It was a part of the scheme called "Mazdoor Manzil" aimed at self-sufficiency for the rural-cum-urban township in all the essential requirements of life.

== Admission & Recognition ==
Admission in Diploma Engg. courses in Guru Brahamanand Ji Govt. Polytechnic Institute were made on the basis of Diploma Entrance Exam till 2020 through online counselling & offline counselling if the seats remains vacant due to certain reasons. Post COVID-19 merit of Secondary School Examination (Matriculation) or equivalent qualifying examination through online counselling & offline counselling if the seats remains vacant due to certain reasons. Guru Brahamanand Ji Govt. Polytechnic Institute Nilokheri is affiliated with the Haryana State Board of Technical Education (HSBTE), Panchkula and approved by All India Council of Technical Education, New Delhi (AICTE) and the Department of Technical Education, Govt. of Haryana (DTE).

== Academic programs ==
Guru Brahamanand Ji Govt. Polytechnic Institute Nilokheri offers post Tenth Class diplomas in the following three-year engineering programs:

	Discipline	Intake	Full Time\Part Time
1	Computer Engineering	120	Full Time
2	Civil Engineering	120	Full Time
3	Electrical Engineering	60	Full Time
4	Electronics and Communication Engineering	120	Full Time
4	Environmental Engineering	120	Full Time
5	Mechanical Engineering	120	Full Time
6	Instrumentation and Control Engineering	60	Full Time

=== Skill development programs ===
Institution also imparts training to artisans and unskilled personnel run under 100% Centre Sponsored Community Development through Polytechnic (CDTP) Scheme and courses Creation of Employment Generation Opportunities (CEGO). These courses help in up gradation of skill and generation of employment.

	Discipline	Intake	Full Time\Part Time	Duration	Scheme
1	Cutting Tailoring & Needle Works	10	Full Time	3-6 Months	CDTP
2	Garment Making	10	Full Time	3-6 Months	CDTP
3	Motor Winding	10	Full Time	3-6 Months	CDTP
4	Embroidery	10	Full Time	3-6 Months	CDTP
5	Cutting & Tailoring	10	Full Time	3-6 Months	CDTP
6	Computer Application	10	Full Time	3-6 Months	CDTP
7	Computer Operator	10	Full Time	3-6 Months	CDTP
8	Pathology Lab	10	Full Time	3-6 Months	CDTP
9	Welding & Fabrication	10	Full Time	3-6 Months	CEGO
10	Electrician Repair	10	Full Time	3-6 Months	CEGO
11	Computer Application	10	Full Time	3-6 Months	CEGO
12	Tally Accountancy	10	Full Time	3-6 Months	CEGO
13	Computer Hardware & Repair	10	Full Time	3-6 Months	CEGO
14	Printing	10	Full Time	3-6 Months	CEGO

== Campus ==
Govt. Polytechnic Nilokheri campus total campus size is around 26.4 Acres. The institute has around 600 Diploma students.

== Student life ==
=== Poly-Fest ===
The Polytechnic along with other Polytechnic institute organizes its annual cultural fest Poly-Fest. It is a Two-day-long event held in October every year.

=== Annual Athletic Meet ===
Annual Athletic Meet is organized since 1968 in the month of March Every Year.

=== Training and Placement Cell ===
Training and Placement (T&P) Cell, has the primary aim of helping students to find a job during and after completion of Diploma Programme.

=== Alumni Meet ===
Alumni Coordinator along with the student representative of the Institute organises Alumni Meet in 2007, 2009 and 2021.

== Consultancy ==
The institute is testing cement, concrete and soils for government deparmtnets, semi-government departments, public sector agencies and private sector agencies.

== Alumni ==
The diploma holders from this institute have found employment in various government departments and public and private enterprises such as railways, MES, IIT, CPWD, PWD (B & R), PWD Irrigation, PWD (Public Health), Pollution Control Board, Housing Boards, HUDA, HSEB, MITC, and Panchayat Raj. Some have started their own enterprises. Students of the institute have also been able enter other countries as well, such as Eritrea and Dubai.

== National Cadet Corps ==
The institute also has a National Cadet Corps scheme. NCC (Army Wing) is operational in the Institute since 1960, having a strength of full COY of 160 NCC cadets under 7 HR.BN. NCC Karnal for better development of students enriching their overall personality. The cadets actively participate in social activities such as Save Earth Campaign during Earth Day, Swachhta Abhiyan on Gandhi Jayanti, Beti Bachao- Beti Padhao Abhiyan on International Day of the Girl Child & International Literacy Day etc.

== Library ==
The library is stocked with around one lakh volumes, and 19 journals and magazines. It subscribes to all prominent newspapers. It has an approximately 1000 square metres of built-up area consisting of a reading room with sitting capacity of 150. The library has a book bank, which provides students with textbooks for almost all the subjects.

== Hostels for accommodation ==
There are two separate hostels for the accommodation of diploma students:

- Boys Hostel-A has 80 rooms for 240 students.
- Girls Hostel-B has 35 rooms for 105 students.

== History ==
The concept of the diploma institute at Nilokheri as an engineering college was first introduced in year 2000. The college building was previously used by the students of Govt. Polytechnic Nilokheri was granted the status of Engineering college in 2016. The college was inaugurated by Manohar Lal Khattar, who was the Chief Minister of Haryana. It was established to facilitate and promote studies and research in emerging areas of engineering education with focus on new frontiers of technology and connected fields. The Guru BrahmaNand Ji Govt. Polytechnic Nilokheri (GBNGPN) formerly known as the Govt. Polytechnic Nilokheri (GPN)'s classes of Diploma 1st year were shifted out en bloc to mark the beginning of GEC Nilokheri at its campus in new building. The Guru BrahmaNand Ji Govt. Polytechnic Nilokheri (GBNGPN) is thus the mother institution of GEC Nilokheri.

== See also ==
- Government Engineering College, Nilokheri
- List of universities in India
- Universities and colleges in India
- Education in India
- List of institutions of higher education in Haryana
