= Central Tool Room Extension Centre, Nilokheri =

Indian technical institute

Coordinates: 29.8489047°N 76.9331584°E

- Abbreviation: CTR, Nilokheri
- Predecessor: Integrated Training Centre, Nilokheri
- Merged into: Ministry of Micro, Small and Medium Enterprises
- Established: 1948
- Founder: Government of India
- Type: Governmental organisation
- Legal status: company
- Location: Nilokheri, Karnal district, Haryana, India
- Services: employment and training
- Members: Small Industries Development Organisation
- Parent organisation: Ministry of Micro, Small and Medium Enterprises
- Budget: 7 crore rupees (Approx) according to 2011-2012 RTI
- Staff: 10

Central Tool Room Extension Centre, Nilokheri i.e. CTR Extension Centre, Nilokheri is a technical institute of Haryana imparting technical training for skill development of technical staff & students of engineering field.

== History ==
Integrated Training Centre, Nilokheri was relinquished due to some conflict between the Principal and Vice-Principal. It was later on 23 June 2014 that the Centre was taken over by Ministry of Micro, Small and Medium Enterprises which led to its development as Extension Centre for Central Tool Room, Ludhiana i.e. Central Tool Room, Extension Centre, Nilokheri was established.

== Training Programs ==
Central Tool Room Extension Centre, Nilokheri offers post diplomas/degree job oriented technical training programme. Central Tool Room Extension Centrer, Nilokheri is currently running various technical short term courses Like AutoCAD, Pro-E, CNC Milling and Turning Programming and Solidworks. It provides summer training programs for graduates and Under graduates in Engineering or Computer Sciences short term. This Centre specialises in training technicians in Mechanical engineering related fields. The training Centre serves the prime importance for summer training by the students of Government Engineering College, Nilokheri, Govt. Polytechnic Nilokheri, Govt. Polytechnic, Umri, University Institute of Engineering and Technology, Kurukshetra University, National Institute of Design, Kurukshetra, National Institute of Technology, Kurukshetra, and near by Technical institutes.

== Campus ==
The institute is situated at the outskirts of Nilokheri township, at a distance of 143 km. from Delhi on National Highway-I towards north.
