= Jammargal =

Jammargal جمرگال
- Village
- Location within Punjab, Pakistan Jammargal (Pakistan)
- Coordinates: 32°44′21.246″N 73°28′17.1984″E
- Country: Pakistan
- Province: Punjab
- District: Jhelum
- Tehsil: Jhelum
- Union Council: Nakka Khurd

Government
  - Type: Union Council
- Elevation: 275 m (902 ft)

Population (2017)
  - Total: 2,962 (may include Dhok Mian Jumma)
  - Estimate (2023): 3,116 (may include Dhok Mian Jumma)
- Time zone: UTC+5 (PKT)

Jammargal (Urdu: جمرگال), also written as Jamar Ghal or Jamarghal, is a village located in the Jhelum District of Punjab, Pakistan. It is part of Jhelum Tehsil and comes under Nakka Khurd union council. It is located 10.35 kilometers northwest of Rasul and 11.39 kilometers northeast of Jalalpur Sharif.

== Geography ==
Jammargal is located in southern part of Jhelum tehsil.

== Demographics ==
Historical population
Census	Pop.	Time span (yrs)	%±	Annual RoG %±
1951	920	—	—	—
1961	1,024	10	11.30%	1.08%
1972	1,671	11	63.18%	4.55%
1981	1,858	9	11.19%	1.19%
1998	2,523	17	35.79%	1.82%
2017	2,962	19	17.4%	.85%
2023 (est)	3,116	6	5.2%	.85%
Sources
Notes: The demographic data may encompass the inhabitants of Dhok Mian Jumma, an adjacent village.

== Landmarks ==
A small dam bearing the same nomenclature is located 1.93 kilometers west of the village.
