= Anjanthali =

- village
- Location in Haryana, India Anjanthali (India)
- Country: India
- State: Haryana
- District: Karnal
- Elevation: 237 m (778 ft)

Languages
  - Official: Hindi
- Time zone: UTC+5:30 (IST)
- Postal code: 132001
- Telephone code: +91-01745-XXXXXX
- Vehicle registration: HR-05
- Sex Ratio: 904:1000 ♂/♀
- Website: haryana.gov.in

Anjanthali is a village in Nilokheri sub-district of Karnal district, Haryana, India. The village is famous for the Mata Anjana Devi mandir temple of great Mata Añjanā, the mother of Lord Hanuman in the Indian epic, the Ramayana. Anjanthali and Munak is the location of Maharana Pratap Horticultural University, Karnal.

== Etymology ==
The word Anjanathali is composed of two Sanskrit language root words, Añjanā (the mother of Lord Hanuman in the Indian epic Ramayana) and Sthal (place or abode), meaning the abode of mother goddess Anjana.

== Demography ==
As per 2011 census of India, the village had a population of 3459, 1832 males and 1627, in 671 families, 62.44% literacy rate (compared to 75.55% of Haryana state), 68.01% Male and 56.10 female literacy rate.

== Administration ==
The village has local Panchayati raj administration, and Gram panchayat council is headed by the elected Sarpanch.

== Education ==
- Maharana Pratap Horticultural University, Karnal, Anjanthali village, 28 km from Karnal.
- Guru Brahmand kanya Mahavidyalaya, Anjanthali, a famous gurukul for girls.
