= Mahatma Gandhi Institute =

Mahatma Gandhi Institute may refer to:

- Mahatma Gandhi Institute of Education for Peace and Sustainable Development (New Delhi, India)
- Mahatma Gandhi Institute of Medical Sciences (Sevagram, Maharashtra, India)
- Mahatma Gandhi Institute for Rural Industrialization (Wardha, Maharashtra, India)
- Mahatma Gandhi Institute of Technology (Gandipet, Hyderabad, Telangana, India)
- Mahatma Gandhi Institute (Mauritius)
