= Feldafing displaced persons camp =

Coordinates: 47.944637°N 11.293774°E

Feldafing displaced persons camp in Bavaria was the first DP camp exclusively for use by liberated Jewish concentration camp prisoners. It was later used by Jewish refugees from the Russian-controlled Jewish areas. The camp was located in Feldafing's Höhenberg area and beyond.

== Overview ==
The camp was opened by the United States Army on May 1, 1945, as an emergency measure to house mostly Hungarian Jews who were in cattle cars when liberated at railroad sidings near at the Tutzing Railroad Station next to a German hospital train. The train has originated from Mühldorf-Mettenheim concentration camp for transporting only Jewish prisoners gathered from Mittergars, Mühldorf Waldlager (Ampfing) and Mühldorf-Mettenheim Concentration Camps to be massacred in the Tyrolian mountains by an SS that was waiting for said transport. The war was near its end when the knowing Wehrmacht transport commander kept delaying the train to be liberated by the advance units of the US Army. The Germans kept guarding the train until the Americans took them prisoner, though the worst of the guards escaped. Some prisoners were immediately transferred to the hospital train and the prisoner train was taken to the track right above the Hitler Youth school in Feldafing (the town next to Tutzing), where the prisoners disembarked. The German Train Commander and two female guards, recognized as having helped the prisoners' survival, were given freedom and living quarters along with the liberated prisoners. In charge of the camp was First Lieutenant Irving J. Smith, a Jewish soldier and peacetime attorney, serving in the Army's Civil Affairs Command.

The Feldafing DP camp was formed in the grounds of the Reichsschule Feldafing consisting of seven large two-story buildings, at least a dozen temporary buildings and six or seven associated large villas, an elite school for Hitlerjugend situated in a villa area on Höhenberg and beyond in Feldafing, with an expansive view of the lake. The villas were variously purchased, forcibly sold, or confiscated by the Nazi authorities, often from Jewish owners. A few of the barracks were used as a concentration camp for Russian POW's, who were repatriated after a few months. Russian prisoners were a security risk in terms of robbery, fighting, attempted rape. The remainder of the liberated prisoners were all Jews, most from Hungary. The non-Jews were definitely not included in the subject transport. The large camp buildings were set up as a hospital complex ready to receive German wounded. A large red cross was painted on each of their roofs. One of the barracks was put to immediate use as a hospital for a large number of German sick and wounded. Other buildings were also had treatment facilities for lesser cases. The wounded came from the massacre at Poing and a mistaken allied aircraft strafing.

Educational and religious life flourished in Feldafing. In addition to Feldafing's secular elementary and high school systems, the camp's religious community founded several schools, including a Talmud Torah (religious elementary school), a yeshiva (religious academy), and several seminaries including Bet Medrash Lita (Lithuania) and Bet Medrash Ungarn (Hungary). Feldafing also had a rabbinical council that supported its religious office, an agency that held considerable influence within the camp. The camp's extensive library also had a noteworthy religious book collection. Secular instruction was available for adults at an evening school, an ORT vocational training school, and a nursing school.

Housed in a separate kinderblock of 450 children and adolescents, many of Feldafing's youngsters organized into "kibbutzim" groups interested in aliyah to Eretz Israel. These included secular kibbutzim like "Shayeret Zvi" and "Zerubavel," and religious kibbutzim such as "Chafetz Chaim" and "Ohel Sarah." Several newspapers were published in Feldafing, including Dos Fraje Wort (The Free Word) and Dos Jiddishe Wort (The Jewish Word) as well as supplementary magazines like the Feldafinger Magazin. Theater troupes such as the "Partisans" and "Habima" entertained the camp population. Camp residents also organized an orchestra. The theatre troupe, "Amchu" [Yiddish: your people], was sponsored by the camp's Jewish Workers Committee.

General Dwight D. Eisenhower personally inspected the living conditions of Feldafing in September 1945. The hospital, as well as additional housing, was a direct result of the Harrison report and Eisenhower's visit to the camp. Footage of Eisenhower's visit shows crowds of survivors surrounding Eisenhower, much as they did when Zionist leaders like David Ben-Gurion visited the camp. Ben-Gurion's initial visit to the camp in October 1945 was an important boost of confidence to the population of Feldafing and its central committee. As the first all-Jewish DP camp in the U.S. zone, Feldafing also marked the site of the first elected Jewish camp committee.

Feldafing's camp committee was subdivided into several offices, including staffs for housing, provisions, economics, sanitation, culture, and legal matters. The strong camp court launched a project to codify laws for the camp in 1946 and led a movement to standardize law for all the Sh'erit ha-Pletah in the U.S. zone of Germany. The court also issued decisions concerning several former kapos living within the camp. The Feldafing court helped investigate the perpetrators of the Kielce pogrom of 1946 and publicized information about the Nazi murderers of Lithuanian Jews who were thought to have been in the vicinity. In 1946, about 4,000 Jews lived at Feldafing and by Passover 1951, 1,585 Jewish DPs remained in the camp. The camp went over to German administration on December 1, 1951, and closed in March 1953.

== Notes ==
This article incorporates text from the United States Holocaust Memorial Museum webpage, and has been released under the GFDL licence. See Wikipedia OTRS ticket number 2007071910012533 for details.

== Readings ==
- Haia Karni (Korman), Embers Of Hope, Life at the Feldafing, Germany displaced persons camp 1945–1952, Printed USA, 2009, ISBN 978-0-578-13593-9
