= Government Senior Secondary School, Nilokheri =

Location
- Govt. Sr. Sec. School, Nilokheri; Nilokheri 132117; Karnal, Haryana; India; 29.8371691°N 76.9321151°E

Information
- Former names: High School
- Type: Public School
- Campus: 31,577.92 m^{2} (339,901.9 sq ft)
- Colors: Blue and Navy Blue
- Affiliation: Haryana Board of School Education, Bhiwani

Government Senior Secondary School, Nilokheri is a public school teaching students in 6th through twelfth grade from Nilokheri township of Karnal in Haryana, India.
