= Maman Abdurrahman (politician) =

Indonesian politician (born 1980)

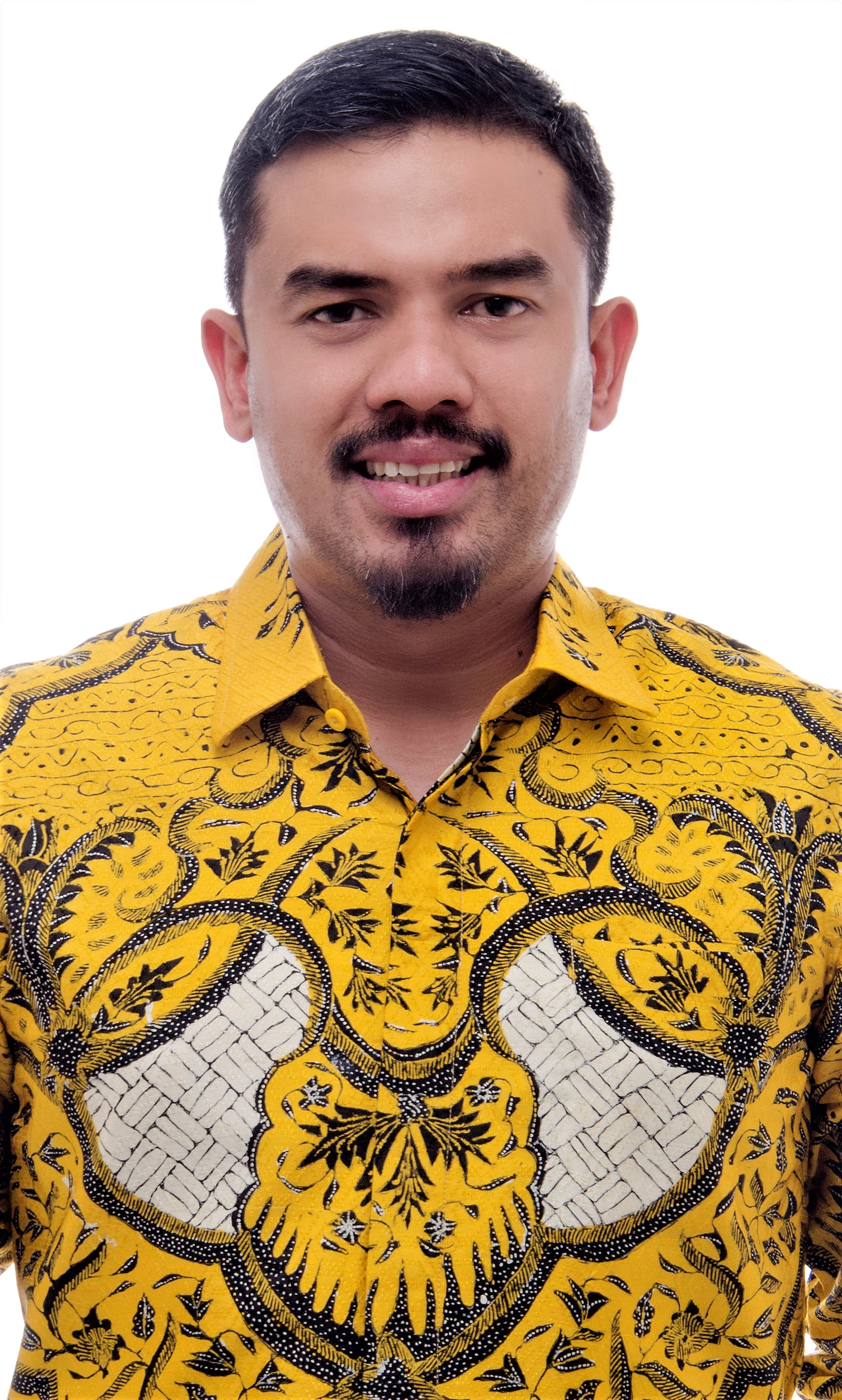

1st Minister of Micro, Small, and Medium Enterprises
- Incumbent
- Assumed office 21 October 2024
- President: Prabowo Subianto
- Deputy: Helvi Yuni Moraza
- Preceded by: Office established

Member of the House of Representatives
- In office 28 July 2018 – 21 October 2024
- Preceded by: Zulfadhli
- Constituency: West Kalimantan (2018–2019); West Kalimantan I (2019–2024)

Personal details
- Born: 10 September 1980 (age 46) Pontianak, West Kalimantan, Indonesia
- Party: Golkar
- Spouse: Agustina Hastarini
- Children: 2
- Education: Trisakti University (S.T.)

Maman Abdurrahman (born 10 September 1980) is an Indonesian politician serving as Minister of Micro, Small, and Medium Enterprises since 2024. From 2018 to 2024, he was a member of the House of Representatives.

== Controversy ==
Maman attracted controversy when a circular letter under the Ministry of Micro, Small and Medium Enterprises heading dated on 30 June 2025 went viral in social media. The letter was a request for 6 Indonesian ambassadors and a consulate general in Istanbul, Pomorie, Sofia, Brussels, Paris, Lucerne, and Milan to accompany his wife, Agustina Hastarini, from 30 June to 14 July 2025 under a "cultural mission". Because Agustina was not a government official, Maman was accused for abuse of power. Then on 4 July 2025, Maman gave his clarification to KPK that the visit of his wife accompanying his children to the World Innovative Student Expo was covered with his own expenses, not via state budget. He also admitted that he had no idea where the circular letter was made.
