= Alois Degano =

German architect

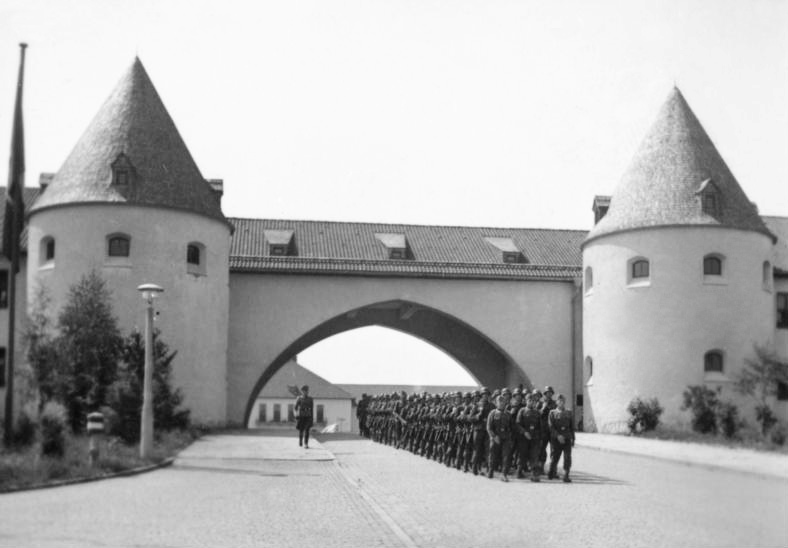
SS-Junkerschule Bad Tölz

Alois Degano (born March 1887 in Schmerold, municipality of Gmund am Tegernsee; died 26 July 1960 in Gmund am Tegernsee in Gmund am Tegernsee) was a German architect and building inspector.

Degano studied architecture in Munich and then worked as a freelance architect and master builder in Gmund am Tegernsee. Through Franz Xaver Schwarz, the "Reichsschatzmeister (Treasurer) of the NSDAP", for whom he had built a house in Gmund, he met Adolf Hitler at the beginning of 1933. Degano joined the NSDAP on 1 May 1933 (membership number 2.942.463)

After many years of working at Tegernsee, he became one of the master builders in the Obersalzberg area in the Third Reich. His best-known building was the conversion of the Haus Wachenfeld into Hitler’s Berghof in Obersalzberg near Berchtesgaden.

Other buildings in the Third Reich were the SS Junker School in Bad Tölz (1935–1936), the Reich Chancellery Berchtesgaden (1936–1937) as well as the new building of the Reichsschule Feldafing (1937–1938) on Lake Starnberg.
