= Integrated Training Centre, Nilokheri =

Integrated Training Center, Nilokheri
- Abbreviation: ITC, Nilokheri
- Merged into: Ministry of Micro, Small and Medium Enterprises
- Established: 1948
- Founder: Government of India
- Type: Governmental organization
- Legal status: company
- Location: Nilokheri, Karnal district, Haryana, India
- Services: employment and training
- Members: Small Industries Development Organization
- Parent organization: Ministry of Micro, Small and Medium Enterprises
- Secessions: Central Tool Room Extension Center, Nilokheri
- Budget: 7 crore rupees (Approx) according to 2011-2012 RTI
- Staff: 294

Integrated Training Center, Nilokheri was an employment and training agency in Nilokheri in Karnal district in the state of Haryana owned and managed by Khadi and Village Industries Commission a statutory body formed by the Government of India and responsible for upgrading technical skills of technicians.

== History ==
It was built around the vocational training centre that was transferred from Kurukshetra, in July, 1948 to the 1100 acres of swampy land on the Delhi-Ambala highway as one of several enterprises intended to provide employment and training for displaced persons following the partition of India It was a part of the scheme called "Mazdoor Manzil" aimed at self-sufficiency for the rural-cum-urban township in all the essential requirements of like. This training center was under Small Industries Development Organization (SIDO) and used to provide training to extension officers (industries of State Governments as well as managers and technician entrepreneurs both in modern small scale and traditional village industries. later on Monday 13 April 1958 colony was inaugurated by Shri Lal Bahadur Shastri current incharge of Ministry of Commerce and Industry (India) During the Year 1986-87 the center trained 200 technician, 85 women under core women training programme and 57 SIDO officers.

== Functions ==
ITC as a part of SIDO organisation it provides technical training to artisans and workers sponsored by the state government. It also organizes training of Extension Officers engaged in various developmental organization.

== ITC as Central Tool Room Extension Center, Nilokheri ==
Due to some conflict between the Principal and Vice-Principal of Integrated Industrial Training Centre was relinquished. Later on 23 June 2014 the center was taken over by Ministry of Micro, Small and Medium Enterprises which led to its development as Extension Center for Central Tool Room, Ludhiana i.e. Central Tool Room Extension Center, Nilokheri. Central Tool Room Extension Center, Nilokheri is currently running various technical short term courses. It provides summer training programs for graduates and undergraduates studying for Degrees or Diplomas in Engineering or Computer Sciences. This Center specialises in training technicians in Mechanical engineering related fields.

== Center structure and functions ==
The center comes under the Government of India and had a principal and a vice Principal.
