= Berchtesgaden Chancellery =

Branch of the Berlin Reich Chancellery

Reichskanzlei Dienststelle Berchtesgaden
- Little Reich Chancellery
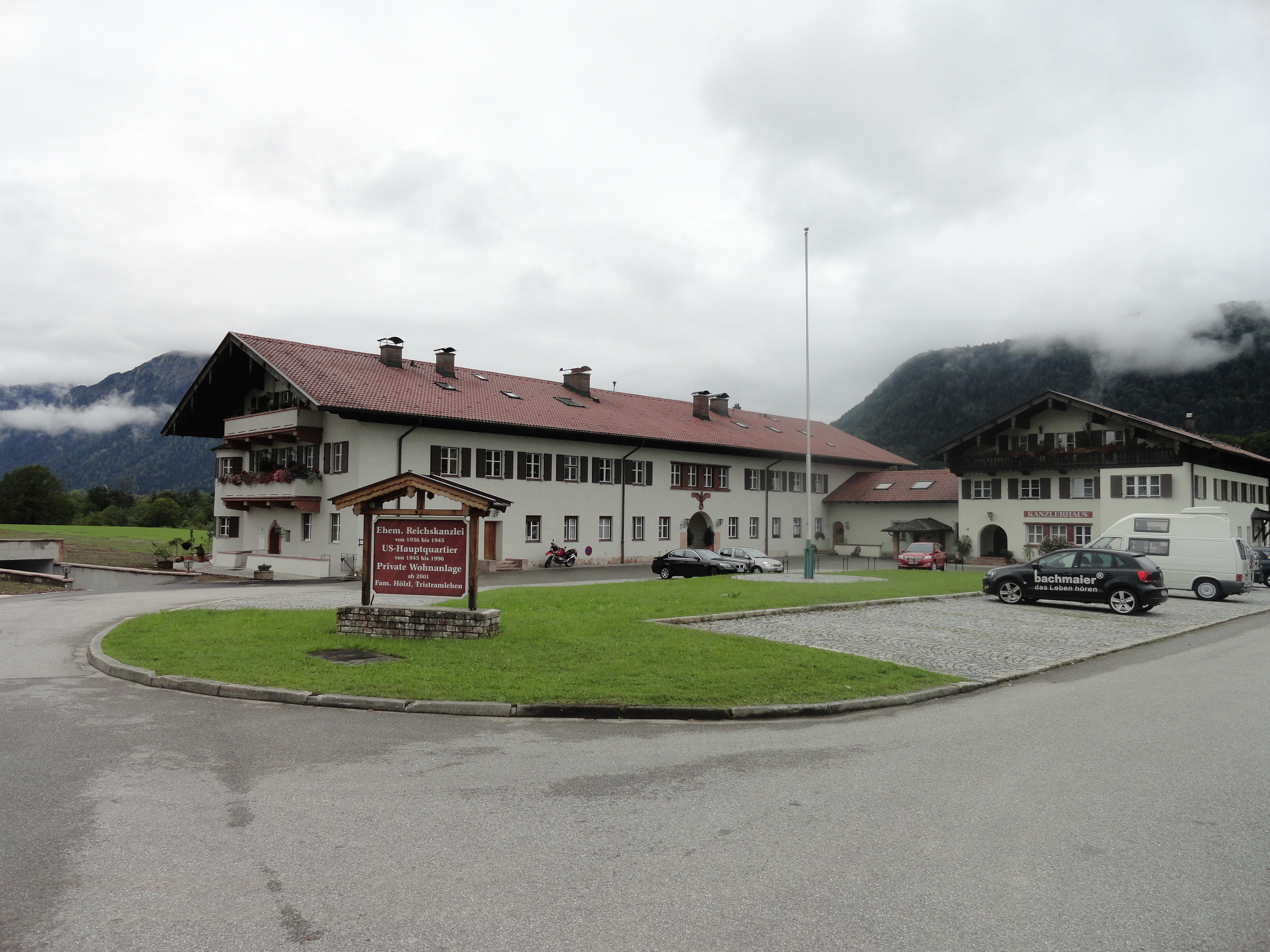

- Location within Bavaria Location within Germany

General information
- Status: In Use
- Location: Bischofswiesen, Berchtesgaden, Germany
- Coordinates: 47°37′52″N 12°58′28″E

The Berchtesgaden Chancellery Branch office (also "Little Reich Chancellery") in Bischofswiesener district Stanggaß was built between 1937 and 1945 after plans by Alois Degano as the second seat of government of Nazi Germany for the time of Adolf Hitler's presence on nearby Obersalzberg.

The buildings of the Reich Chancellery and the bunkers and the northeast vehicle hall are listed buildings. All buildings are now privately owned and used as residential buildings.

== Planning and construction ==
The architect Alois Degano was commissioned with the planning of the buildings. Construction started in mid-September 1936. The high groundwater level made it difficult to erect the foundations, which is why a floating foundation was installed on 620 concrete piles. Degano had opted for a main building with side wing, in addition, a garage building with staff housing was built northeast. The topping-out ceremony took place on 18 January 1937, the completion of the aboveground building took place in July 1937. Between 1943 and 1945, the 500 m long air defense tunnel was built.

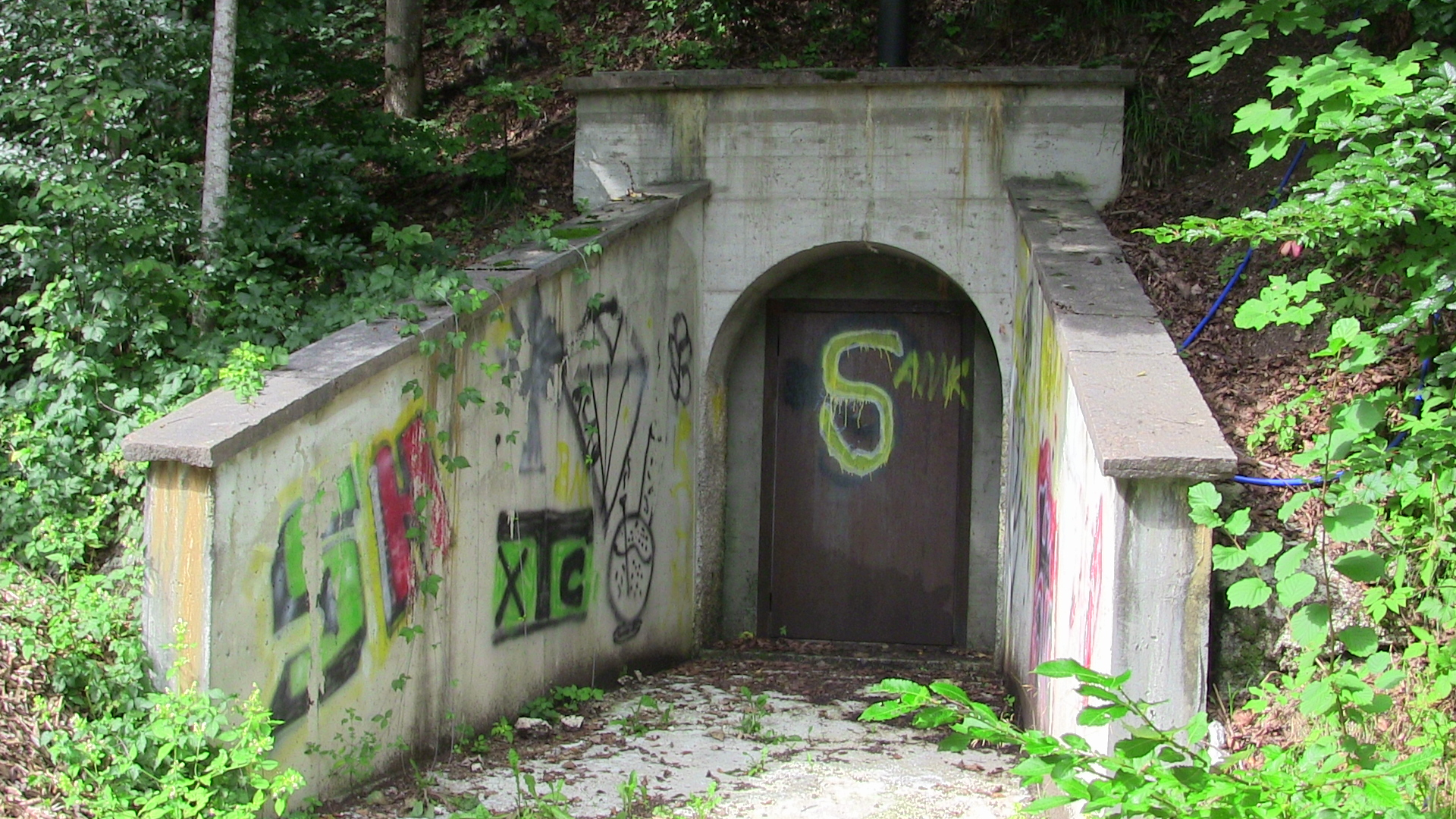
Entrance to the bunker system of the "Reichskanzlei Dienststelle Berchtesgaden" in 2019

== Operational service ==
Parallel to the stays in the Berghof, on the Obersalzberg Adolf Hitler took advantage of the working areas of the "Little Chancellery" to write a total of about 125 laws and regulations. In addition, political guests were received in this building. In later-bought buildings, the High Command of the Wehrmacht was accommodated if necessary.

From 1937, the head of the Reich Chancellery Hans Heinrich Lammers, the department head of "Department A" Willy Meerwald and other officials in the summer months performed their duties in the office Berchtesgaden. In correspondence as well as in public usage was spoken not by the Reich Chancellery Berchtesgaden, but by the Department of the Reich Chancellery in Berchtesgaden. This was to avoid the impression that the Reich Chancellery was completely relocated to Berchtesgaden.

== Postwar use ==
In May 1945, the Reich Chancellery Berchtesgaden Office was occupied by the U.S. Army. U.S. General Omar Bradley was chauffeured in one of the vehicles from Hitler's fleet on the grounds to accept a tribute call of U.S. soldiers on site and awards. Between 1945 and 1995, the buildings were used by the U.S. Army. From 1996, the Federal Republic could dispose of the property and sold it to a group of private investors.

The interior of the Little Chancellery is still largely available in its original form. The owner attaches importance to maintain this state.

== See also ==
- Führer Headquarters
- Kehlsteinhaus
- Nazi architecture
- Operation Foxley, a British Special Operations Executive (SOE) plan to assassinate Hitler in 1944
- Traudl Junge

== Sources and references ==
- Eberle, Henrik & Uhl, Matthias. The Unknown Hitler.
- GUIDO, Pietro (2013). Hitler's Berghof and the Tea-House (2° ed.). Milan: ISEM. ISBN 978-88-87077-07-0.
- Walden, Geoffrey R. (2014). Hitler's Berchtesgaden – A Guide to Third Reich Sites in the Berchtesgaden and Obersalzberg Area. Fonthill Media. ISBN 978-1-78155-226-1.
- Wilson, James (2005). Hitler's Alpine Retreat. Barnsley, S. Yorkshire, England: Pen & Sword Military. ISBN 1-84415-263-4. 271 photos of the Obersalzberg complex and biographies of leading Nazi figures.
