= Ch. Ranbir Singh State Institute of Engineering & Technology, Jhajjar =

College in Haryana, India

- Other names: CRSSIET Jhajjar
- Type: Public Government agency
- Established: 2017
- Chairman: HR Government
- Director: Dr Shailendra Kumar
- Academic staff: 20+
- Students: 300+
- Undergraduates: 300+
- Postgraduates: 0
- Location: Jhajjar, Haryana, India; 28°33′N 76°42′E
- Campus: Semi-urban
- Affiliations: UGC, AICTE, MDU, NEW DELHI, HSBTE, Haryana
- Website: www.crssietjhajjar.ac.in

The Ch. Ranbir Singh State Institute of Engineering & Technology, Jhajjar (Hindi : चौधरी रणबीर सिंह राजकीय अभियांत्रिकी एवं प्रौद्योगिकी संस्थान, झज्जर, abbreviated CRSSIET) is a public government engineering institution in Jhajjar. It is one of the four engineering colleges run by the Government of Haryana, the others being Ch. Devi Lal State Institute of Engineering & Technology, Sirsa, Rao Bijender Singh State Institute of Engineering & Technology, Rewari, and State Institute of Engineering & Technology, Nilokheri.

== History ==
Ch. Ranbir Singh State Institute of Engineering & Technology, Jhajjar is a State Government Engineering College in Haryana. The college was Established in 2017, This college is named after the former Ranbir Singh Hooda, was an Indian Independence activist and a Politician from Haryana. He Belonged to Haryana and was a Minister in The Individual Punjab and Haryana.

== Recognition ==
Ch. Ranbir Singh State Institute of Engineering and Technology, Jhajjar affiliated to Maharishi Dayanand University is approved by All India Council of Technical Education, New Delhi and the Department of Technical Education, Govt. of Haryana.

== Admission ==
Admission in B.Tech. first year is given to students on the basis of their ranks in Joint Entrance Examination-Main. Admission in second year though B.Tech. Lateral Entry scheme is done on basis of B.E./B.Tech. Lateral Engineering Entrance Test exam conducted by Haryana State Technical Education Society.

== Academic programs ==
Ch. Ranbir Singh State Institute of Engineering & Technology, Jhajjar awards undergraduate B.Tech in various engineering fields in a four-year engineering programme.

	Discipline	Intake	Full Time\Part Time
1	Computer Science & Engineering	60	Full Time
2	Computer Science and Engineering (AI & ML)	30	Full Time
3	Civil engineering	60	Full Time
4	Electronics and Communication engineering	60	Full Time
5	Mechanical engineering	60	Full Time
6	Electrical engineering	60	Full Time

== Campus ==
The institute is in Jhajjar, district Jhajjar, Haryana. It spreads over 40 acres (16 ha). The site has a strategic location in that it is 72 km (45 mi) from National Capital New Delhi (Railway Station) and 7 km (4.3 mi) from Jhajjar city on Jhajjar-Gurugram State Highway. It is well connected by road and railway having Jhajjar railway station. The campus is also close to other educational, training and research institutions such as the Govt. Polytechnic Jhajjar, University Institute of Engineering and Technology, and Maharishi Dayanand University. The institute is in close proximity to various industrial townships.

== Associated institutions ==
- All India Council for Technical Education
- List of institutions of higher education in Haryana
- National Assessment and Accreditation Council
