= National Small Industries Corporation =

Government of India Enterprise to promote and aid small companies (Founded 1955)

National Small Industries Corporation (NSIC)
- Company type: Government Agency
- Founded: 1955; 71 years ago
- Headquarters: NSIC Bhawan, Okhla Industrial Estate, New Delhi, India
- Areas served: India and Africa
- Key people: Dr. Subhransu Sekhar Acharya (Chairman & MD)
- Parent: Ministry of Micro, Small and Medium Enterprises, Government of India
- Website: nsic.co.in

National Small Industries Corporation Limited (NSIC) is a Mini Ratna government agency established by the Ministry of Micro, Small and Medium Enterprises, Government of India in 1955 It falls under Ministry of Micro, Small & Medium Enterprises of India. NSIC is the nodal office for several schemes of Ministry of MSME such as Performance & Credit Rating, Single Point Registration, MSME Databank, National SC ST Hub, etc.

== History ==
It was established in 1955 to promote and develop micro and small scale industries and enterprises in the country. It was founded as a Government of India agency later made into a fully owned government corporation.

== Operation ==
The National Small Industries Corporation Ltd. (NSIC), is an ISO 9001-2015 certified Government of India Enterprise under Ministry of Micro, Small and Medium Enterprises (MSME).

NSIC operates through countrywide network of offices and Technical Centres in the Country. To manage operations in African countries, NSIC operates from its office in Johannesburg, South Africa. However, From January 2018, Johannesburg office is now closed and is now closely looking after domestic MSME Units. In addition, NSIC has set up Training cum Incubation Centre & with a large professional manpower, NSIC provides a package of services as per the needs of MSME sector.

NSIC has recently partnered with Rubique.com, to facilitate lending for MSME segment. Rubique & NSIC will work together to create an interface which will ease credit facilitation for MSMEs by allowing quicker decision making and evaluation and to widen the product offerings will bring their respective bank/FI tie-ups under one umbrella for MSME.

== Objectives ==
Government of India to promote small and budding entrepreneurs of post independent India, decided to establish a government agency which can mediate and provide help to small scale industries (SSI). As such they established National Small Industries Corporation with objectives to provide machinery on hire purchase basis and assisting and marketing in exports. Further, SSIs registered with NSIC were exempted from paying Earnest money and provided facility of free participation in government tendered purchases. Also for training persons the training facilities centres and for providing assistance in modernising the small industries several branches of NSIC were opened up by government over the years in several big and small towns, where small industries were growing.

NSIC also helps in organising supply of raw materials like coal, iron, steel and other materials and even machines needed by small scale private industries by mediating with other government companies like Coal India Limited, Steel Authority of India Limited, Hindustan Copper Limited and many others, who produce this materials to provide same at concessional rates to SSIs. Further, it also provides assistance to small scale industries by taking orders from Government of India owned enterprises and procures these machineries from SSI units registered with them, thus providing a complete assistance right from financing, training, providing raw materials for manufacturing and marketing of finished products of small scale industries, which would otherwise not be able to survive in face of competition from large and big business conglomerates. It also helps SSI by mediating with government owned banks to provide cheap finance and loans to budding small private industries of India.

Nowadays, it is also providing assistance by setting up incubation centres in other continents and also international technology fairs to provide aspiring entrepreneurs and emerging small enterprises a platform to develop skills, identify appropriate technology, provide hands-on experience on the working projects, manage funds through banks, and practical knowledge on how to set up an enterprise.

== Branches ==
NSIC Technical Services Centres are located at the following places

Name of the Centre	Focus area
Chennai	Leather & Footwear
Howrah	General Engineering
Hyderabad	Electronics & Computer Application
New Delhi	Machine Tools & related activities
Rajkot	Energy Audit & Energy Conservation activities
Rajpura (Pb)	Domestic Electrical Appliances
Ramnagar (UK)	Electronics & computer Hardware and application
Aligarh (UP)	Lock Cluster & Die and Tool making

== Gallery ==
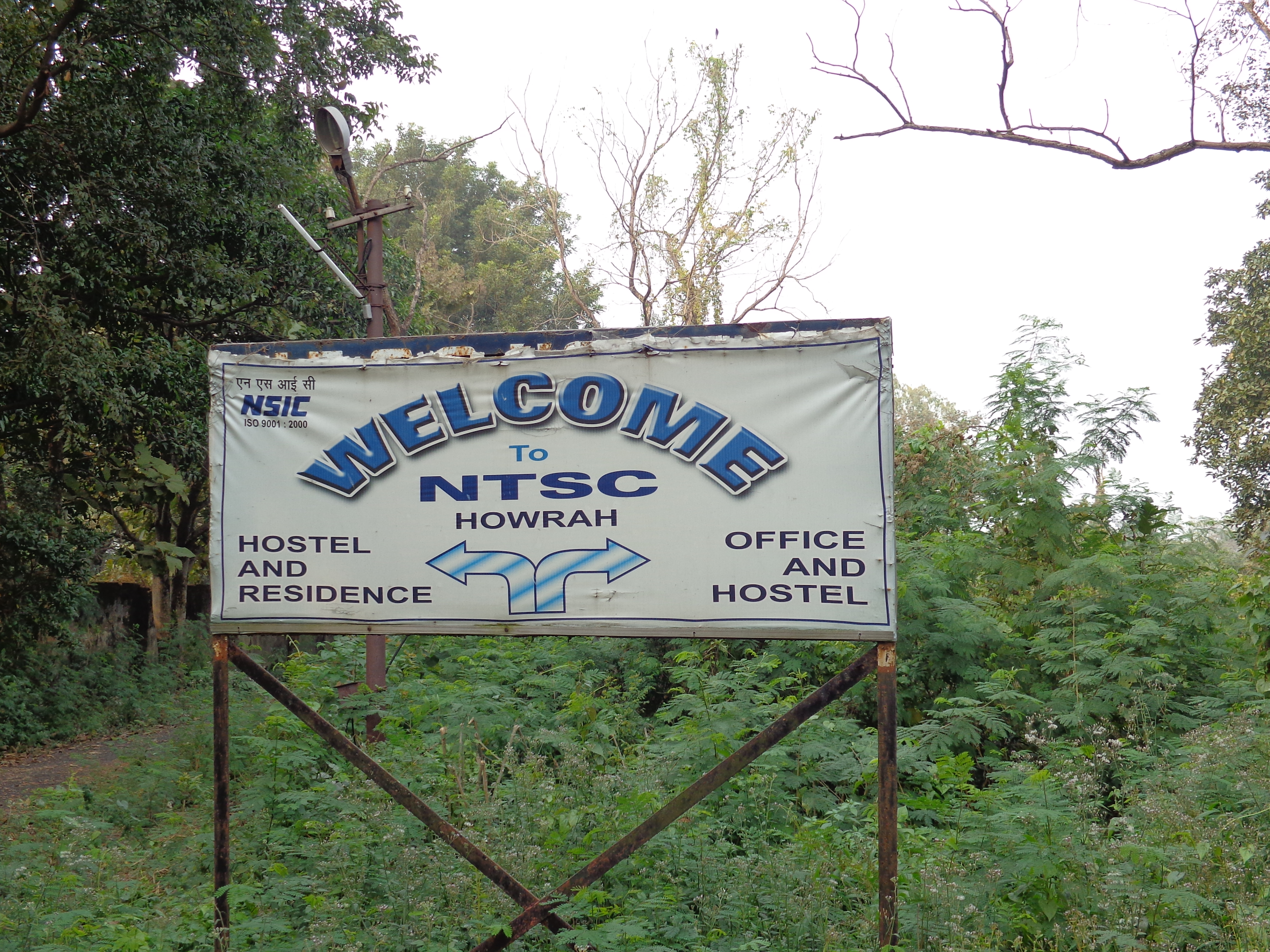
NSIC Technical Service Centre, Howrah

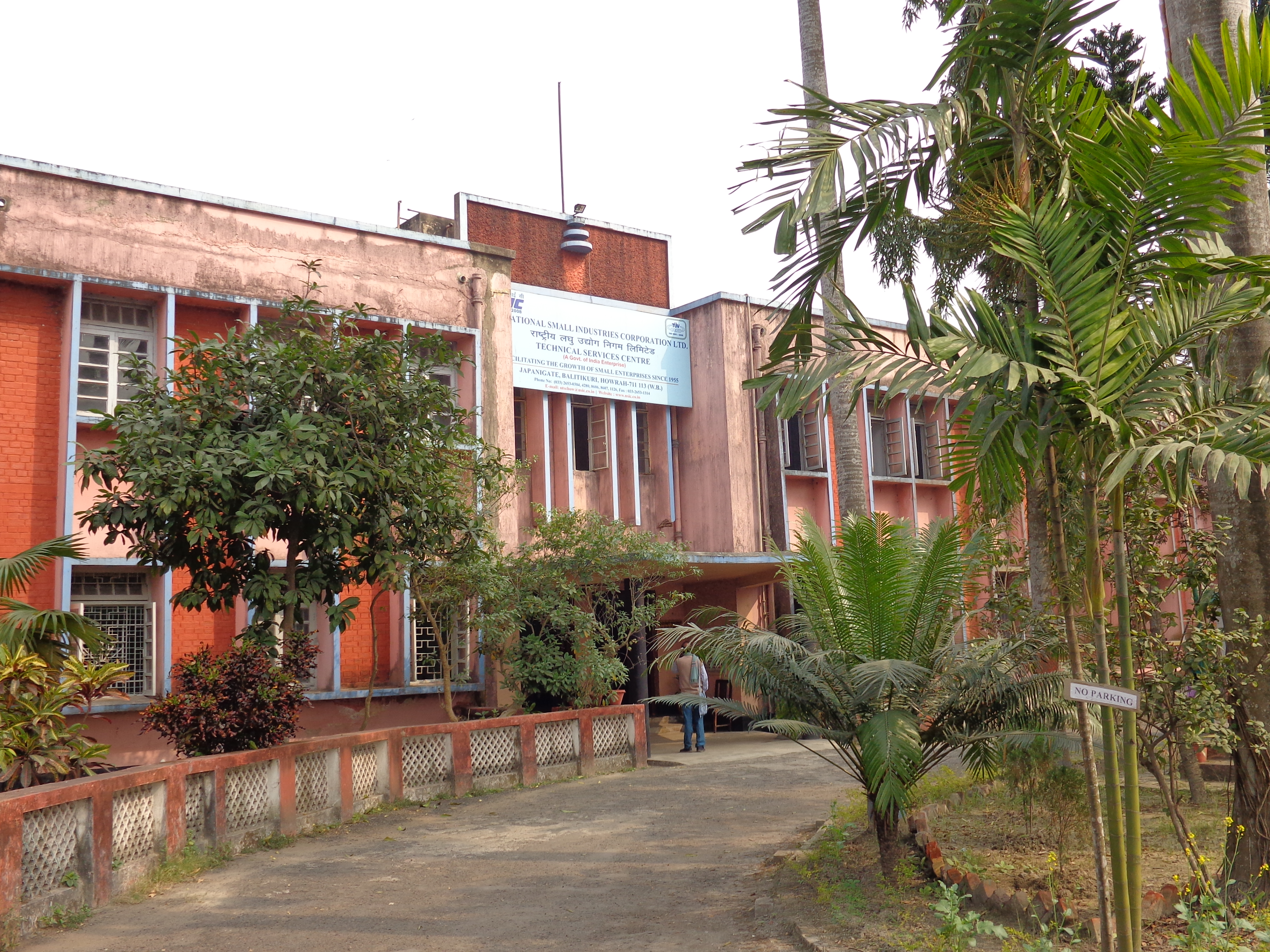
Main Building at NSIC, Howrah

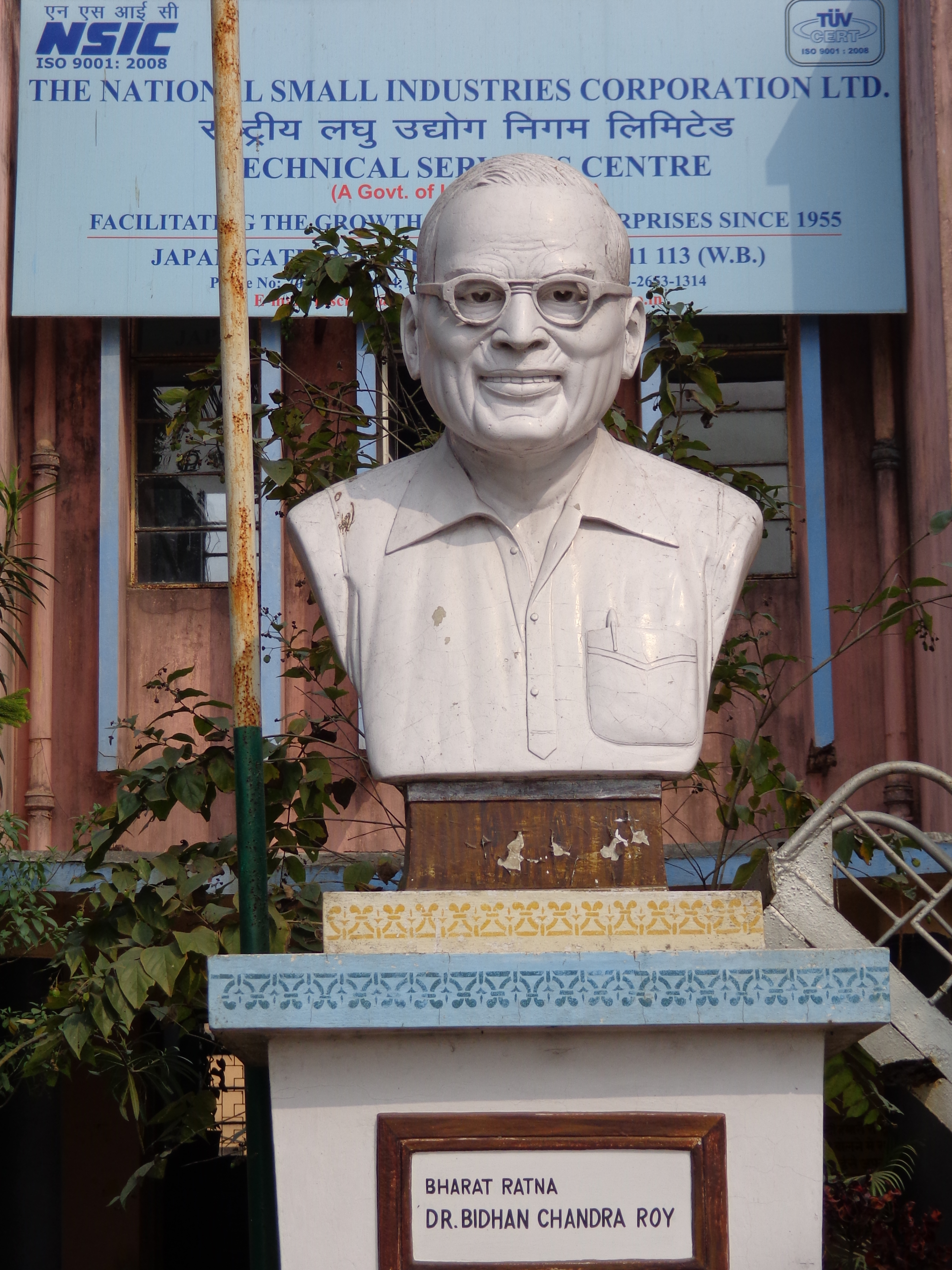
Dr. B.C. Roy Statue in-front of the main building at NSIC, Howrah

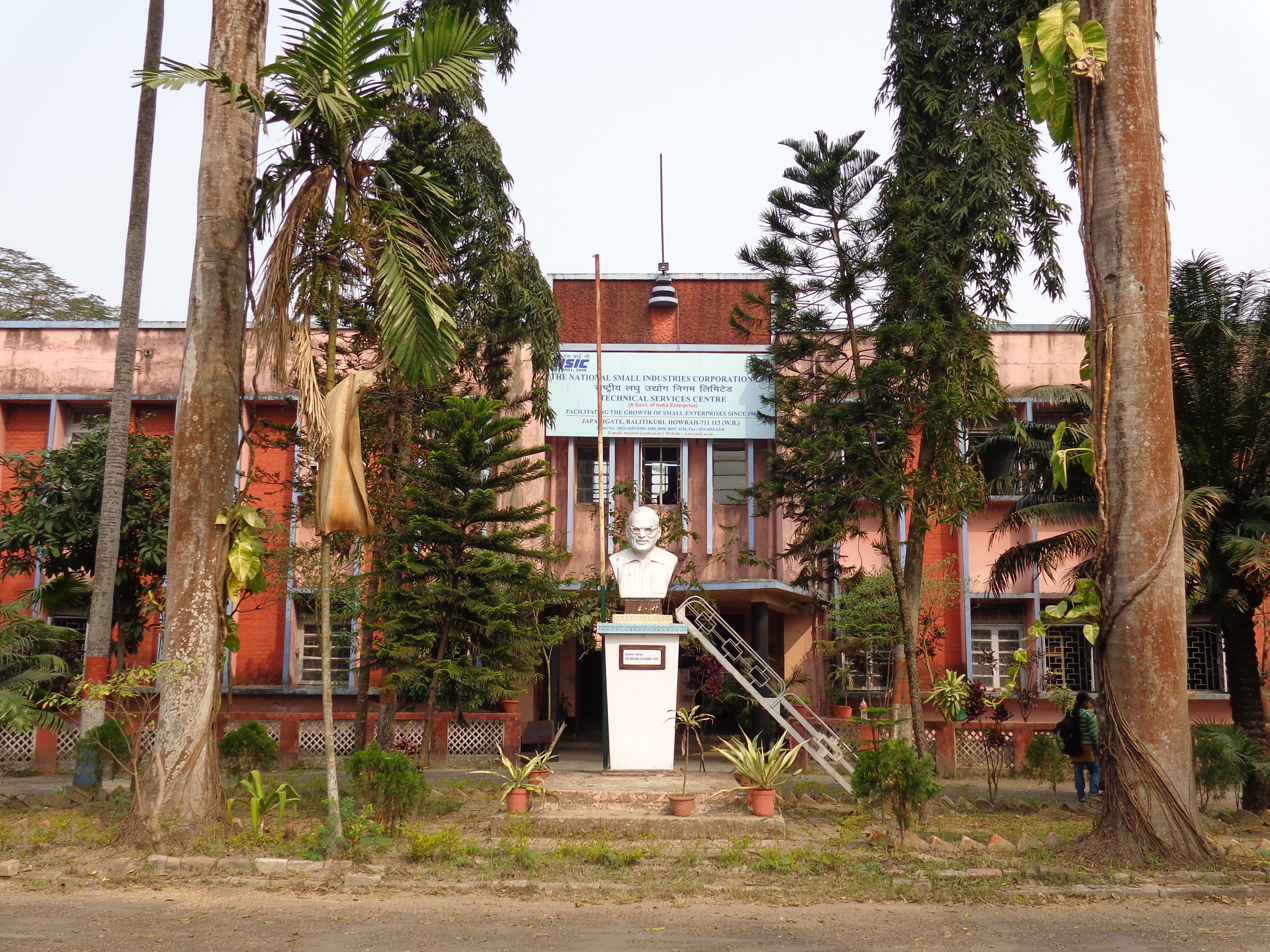
Front View of NSIC, Howrah

== See also ==
- List of public sector undertakings in India
