= Government of India Press, Nilokheri =

- Established: 1948–2015
- Founder: Government of India
- Type: Governmental organization
- Legal status: company
- Purpose: Printing
- Location: Nilokheri, Karnal district, Haryana, India
- Services: Printing exclusively to Government demands
- Members: Directorate of Printing, Ministry of Housing and Urban Poverty Alleviation
- Key people: P. N. Srivastava
- Budget: 7 crore rupees (Approx) according to 2011–12 RTI
- Staff: 294

Government of India Press, Nilokheri is a printing agency in Nilokheri in Karnal district in the state of Haryana owned and managed by the Government of India and responsible is for printing national and public documents.

== History ==
The press was established in late 1948 by the Ministry of Rehabilitation in the rehabilitation colony at Nilokheri in 1948 as one of several enterprises intended to provide employment and training for displaced persons following the partition of India. It was transferred to the Community Projects Administration of the Planning Commission in 1951 and to the Controller of Printing and Stationery (India), New Delhi in February 1954.

In 1972, a top secret wing was added and secret printing jobs for various ministries and government offices were added to the work of the press.

By the 1990s, the letterpress technology used by the press had become outmoded, so the Directorate of Printing began phased modernisation; the first phase began in 1995 and was completed in 1996/97.

== Company structure and functions ==
The Press comes under the Directorate of Printing, New Delhi, and employs approximately 294 people. The company is headed by a manager with two deputy managers.

The Press prints exclusively for the government, including the Gazette of India, Exim Policy, Union Budget work, Railway Budget, Demands for Grants of each Ministry, A.I.R., C.B.I. Bulletin, forms of G.I.F.S., Income Tax, the Delhi Police, ITBP, CRPF, Army, Air Force and other ministries and departments including Lok Sabha and Rajya Sabha, manuals, annual reports, periodicals, and ballot papers.

== Reuse of the site ==
The current Union Minister Manohar Lal Khattar inspected the 35-acre site of the long-shut government printing press in Nilokheri, which falls under Central jurisdiction. He directed the Nilokheri SDM and officials to compile a detailed report and map of the land. The objective is to explore development opportunities, potentially transfer the land to a state department at a fair price, and put it to productive use to generate employment.
