= National School of Leadership =

National School of Leadership, IN
- Motto: Lead by Choice
- Established: 2008
- Managing Director: Shashidhar Nanjundaiah
- Faculty: 50
- Location: (India) Pune, Maharashtra, India
- Chairman: Satasuryaa
- Website: www.nsl.ac.in

The National School of Leadership (NSL) is the first leadership school of global standards in India focusing solely on leadership studies. The criteria for eligibility is very flexible, with openings for students from science, commerce, and humanities backgrounds.

The institution was founded in 2008 as an educational body registered under the ISRA Act of 1860, under Government of India. In 2013, the Faculty of Entrepreneurial Studies of the institution has been established to offer courses and entrepreneurship development activities under Ministry of MSME (Formerly Ministry of Industries), Government of India, for promotion of Entrepreneurship in India.

== Modes of study ==
NSL has multiple modes of training and education, including Full-time classroom programmes, online education, research based study, and the Blended Learning mode – a cognitive neuroscientific technique of education which involves a combination of the best of all three aforementioned modes of study.

== Faculties and courses ==
=== Faculty of Leadership Studies ===
The Faculty of Leadership Studies was established in 2009.

==== Executive Programme in Corporate Leadership (EPCL) ====
National School of Leadership’s one year Executive Programme in Corporate Leadership (EPCL) is an executive master's level programme aimed at preparing students from multiple industries for leadership positions in corporate and other forms of private/public service.

==== Executive Programme in Leadership Strategy (EPLS) ====
The Executive Programme in Leadership Strategy (EPLS) is a programme for strategists in public/private services and for those who wish to take up roles involving strategy design and decision making in organizations.

==== Certificate Programmes ====
The Faculty of Leadership Studies also offers multiple certificate programmes.

=== Faculty of Performance Studies ===
Though this faculty was established for behavioral experts with primary focus on Sports Psychology and Military Psychology, it also addressed the need for performance coaches across most sectors.

==== Executive Programme in Military Psychology and Counselling (EPMPC) ====
The Executive Programme in Military Psychology and Counselling offers a combination of understanding and applying Leadership Science, Psychology and Military Science, primarily inclined to help military personnel.

==== Executive Programme in Sports Psychology (EPSP) ====
With a combined theory and practical study structure, the Executive Programme in Sports Psychology helps psychologists, counselors, coaches, trainers and aspirants of a role in Sports Psychology understand the driving factors that impact sports performance.

==== Fellow Programme in Psychology (FPP) ====
The Fellow Programme in Psychology is a research based doctoral level study that aims at enabling research scholars to bring about new dimensions into existing theories regarding Psychology – especially pertaining to circumstances with an impact on leadership behaviour. In this programme, scholars can conducting research around multiple specializations including Applied Psychology, Organizational Psychology, Counseling Psychology, Sports Psychology, Military Psychology, Educational Psychology, Health Psychology, Social Psychology and Forensic Psychology.

==== Certificate Programmes ====
The Faculty of Performance Studies also offers multiple certificate programmes, mostly of 3 months duration each.

=== Faculty of Entrepreneurial Studies ===
The Faculty of Entrepreneurial Studies (FPS) was established to promote entrepreneurship in India. The primary focus of this faculty was to enable and equip start-ups, small, medium and large entrepreneurial corporations with the skills and mind-set to create a difference in their ventures and contribute to nation building.

In 2014, the Faculty of Entrepreneurial Studies collaborated with the Ministry of MSME (Formerly Ministry of Industries), Government of India. The Faculty of Entrepreneurial Leadership also works closely with NSL's Lead India initiative in nurturing entrepreneurs from varied backgrounds including people from rural areas.

==== Executive Programme in Entrepreneurial Leadership (EPEL) ====
Participants who successfully complete this programme are also awarded a Vocational Diploma in Entrepreneurship apart from business establishment support by the Government of India under its skills development initiative.

==== Fellow Programme in Entrepreneurship (FPE) ====
The Fellow Programme in Entrepreneurship is an advance doctoral level programme.

==== Certificate Programmes ====
The Faculty of Entrepreneurial Studies (FPS), mostly in collaboration with the Ministry of MSME (Formerly Ministry of Industries), offers multiple certificate programmes recognized by the Government of India.

=== Organizational Learning Center ===
The Organizational Learning Center at the National School of Leadership offers leadership training across multiple segments including large corporations, Small and Medium Enterprises, Social Organizations, Colleges and Schools. OLC has also made significant contribution to CEO Coaching and Faculty Development.
