= State Institute of Engineering & Technology, Rewari =

Rao Birender Singh State Institute of Engineering & Technology, Rewari
- राव बीरेंद्र सिंह राजकीय अभियांत्रिकी एवं प्रौद्योगिकी संस्थान, रेवाड़ी
- Type: Public engineering college
- Established: 2017
- Director: Dr. Wazir Singh
- Academic staff: 20+
- Location: Rewari, Haryana, India; 23°17′N 71°46′E
- Campus: Rural
- Acronym: RBSSIET Rewari
- Affiliations: UGC, AICTE, NEW DELHI, IGU, Rewari
- Website: rbssietrewari.ac.in

The Rao Birender Singh State Institute of Engineering & Technology, Rewari (Hindi: राव बीरेंद्र सिंह राजकीय अभियांत्रिकी एवं प्रौद्योगिकी संस्थान, रेवाड़ी) (abbreviated RBSSIETZ) is a government engineering college located in Zainabad, Rewari. It is among the five engineering colleges run by the Government of Haryana, the others being Ch. Devi Lal State Institute of Engineering & Technology, Sirsa, State Institute of Engineering & Technology, Nilokheri (Karnal), Ch. Ranbir Singh State Institute of Engineering & Technology, Jhajjar, and State Institute of Engineering and technology, Panchkula

== History ==
Rao Birender Singh State Institute of Engineering & Technology (RBSSIET), Zainabad also known as Govt Engineering College Rewari, Haryana is located in outskirts of Rewari District. Govt. Engineering College Rewari, Haryana proposed in 2013 and its foundation stone was laid in 2014. The institute started functioning in July 2017 and first batch was passed out in 2021.

== About the Institution ==
The Institute is offering B.Tech. courses in Computer Engineering, CSE (Data Science), Mechanical Engineering, Electronics and Communication Engineering, Electrical Engineering and Civil Engineering. The sanctioned intake is 330 and haryana reservation policy is implemented for filling the seats. All seats are filled by centralised counselling organised by HSTES through JEE main ranking organised by NTA Delhi. The Institute has good placement history in reputed industries situated in haryana state. Admission to 2nd Year of B.Tech. course through Lateral entry is done through Haryana centralised counselling organised by HSTES after completing Diploma or B.Sc. Course.

== Fees Structure ==
The annual fees of the institute is Rs. 40,000/- per year. The fees is paid in two installments. Odd Semester fees is Rs. 25,000/- and even semester fees is Rs. 15,000/-. The institute has nominal hostel charges. The semester hostel fees is Rs. 6,100/-. A security fees of Rs. 4,000/- is charged in 1st semester.
