= Reichsschule Feldafing =

Nazi Party school

Coordinates: 47.9358°N 11.2931°E

The Reichsschule Feldafing was founded on April 1, 1933, as a 9th class Nazi Party school on Lake Starnberg and was located in a villa neighborhood in Feldafing.

== History ==
The Reichsschule Feldafing was located in a 1912 era country house on Lake Starnberg, a part of which Thomas Mann had also owned before it was converted into a private school for the Nazi Storm Trooper leadership.

In 1938, the school got a new building, designed by Alois Degano, and was renamed Reichsschule der NSDAP Feldafing (RSF). The school was sponsored by the leadership of the Nazi Party. In 1942, an addition to the Dachau concentration camp was constructed on adjacent property.

This addition was dissolved on April 23, 1945, and, after the end of World War II, the former Reichsschule students were prevented from pursuing further education.

The US Military converted the former Reichsschule into a Displaced Persons Camp to house Jewish Displaced Persons. After the dissolution of the Feldafing displaced persons camp in 1951, the German Military took over operations of the building. In 1999 the building was renovated and converted into a literature museum.

== See also ==
- Nazi elite schools
