= University of Rasul =

University in Rasul, Pakistan

Coordinates: 32.6768°N 73.5631°E

University of Rasul, Mandi Bahauddin
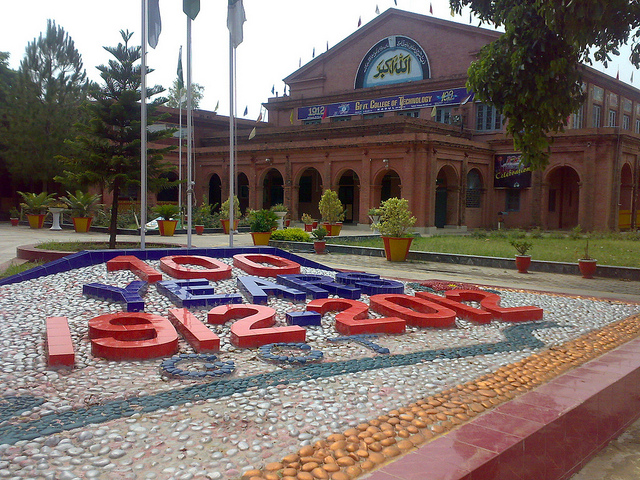
- Former names: Government College of Technology Rasul (GCT Rasul)
- Type: Public
- Established: 1873 - Lahore; 1912 - Relocated to Rasul
- Affiliations: Higher Education Commission (Pakistan), National Technology Council (Pakistan), Pakistan Bar Council, Pharmacy Council of Pakistan
- Chancellor: Governor of the Punjab
- Vice-Chancellor: Prof. Dr. Zahoor Ul Haq
- Location: Rasul, Mandi Bahauddin, Punjab, Pakistan
- Nickname: UORM
- Website: uorm.edu.pk

The University of Rasul, Mandi Bahauddin (UORM) is a public university located in Rasul, Mandi Bahauddin, Punjab, Pakistan.

== History ==
The University of Rasul was founded in 1873 in Lahore as a school of surveying established at the Oriental College, Lahore. It was moved to National College of Arts, Lahore in 1885. In 1906, it was renamed as Punjab School of Engineering and in 1912, it was moved to its current location and again renamed as Government School of Engineering.

In 1962, it was once again renamed as Government Polytechnic Institute (GPI). Later, the institute was upgraded to Government College of Technology (GCT) in 1974. In 2018, the Government of the Punjab upgraded the college to a full-fledged university.
