= Maharana Pratap Horticultural University =

Agricultural university in Anjanthali, India

- महाराणा प्रताप बागवानी विश्वविद्यालय
- Type: Public
- Established: 28 November 2016
- Budget: INR
- Chancellor: Governor of Haryana
- Vice-Chancellor: Suresh K. Malhotra
- Location: Karnal district, Haryana, India; 29.8350734°N 76.8784629°E
- Campus: Anjanthali
- Nickname: MHU
- Website: Official website

Maharana Pratap Horticultural University, Karnal (MHU) was established by the Government of Haryana at Anjanthali Village in Nilokheri sub-district of Karnal district of India. It is 21 km north of Karnal on NH1 leading to Ambala.

== History ==
On 28 November 2016, the university came into existence via Haryana Vidhan Sabha legislature. On 18 April 2017, Chief Minister Manohar Lal Khattar's administration renamed it after the Maharana Pratap.

== Objective ==
It was established for research and development of horticulture.

== Main Campus ==
Main campus is in Anjanthali village in Nilokheri tehsil of Karnal after 97 acres land of HAU's Regional Research Station was transferred to the Horticulture university. University has "Regional Research Stations" at Ambala, Jind and Jhajjar.

== Regional research stations ==
- Captain Pawan Kumar Extension campus, Jind: Captain Pawan Kumar Extension campus is at Badhana village in Jind district for which INR46 crore (460 million) was released in 2018.
- Regional Research Station, Ambala: It is located at Naraingarh in Ambala district.
- Regional Research Station, Jhajjar: located at Jhajjar district.
- RMRC Mushroom Research Center, Murthal in Sonepat

== Collaboration ==
The university participates and collaborates with these initiatives.

=== Cold chain ===
University is establishing a regional cold chain centre in collaboration with United Kingdom.

=== Fruits, Veg and Spice Markets ===
- International Terminal Market for Fruits and Vegetables at near by Ganaur on Grand Trunk Road in Sonepat district is being established on 600 acres which will be larger than . Centre for excellence for horticulture are being established in each district of Haryana, along with 340 horticulture villages. Govt is also promoting an agricultural produce brand called Haryana Fresh.
- Domestic NCR Flower Market at Gurugram
- Spice Market at Sonepat
- Haryana State Honey Trade Centre (HS HTC) at IBDC (Integrated Beekeeping Development Centre), Ramnagar in Kurukshetra district

=== Centres of Excellence in Horticulture ===
As of March 2015, Haryana has 11 Centres of Excellent in Horticulture, 3 under construction, 3 newly announced, including the following. This leaves only Punchkula, Panipat, Faridabad, Rewari, Dadri, Jind, and Kaithal districts without any Horticulture CoE or State-level Horticulture Markets.

1. Ambala district: Centre of Excellence for Litchi, announced in FY2025-26.
2. Yamunanagar district: Centre of Excellence for strawberry, announced in FY2025-26.
3. Karnal district: Centre of Excellence for Vegetables, Gharaunda, established 7.01.2011.
4. Karnal district: Potato Technology Centre, Shamgarh, established 06.04.2016.
5. Kurukshetra district: Centre for Subtropical Fruits, Ladwa, established 06.04.2016.
6. Kurukshetra district: Horticulture Integrated Bee Keeping, Ram Nagar, post office Chaduni Jattan, established 10.11.2017.
7. Rohtak district: Hi-tech Greenhouse Seedling Centre, established 17.12.2013.
8. Jhajjar district: Center of Excellence for Flowers, Munimpur, established 2022.
9. Gurugram district: Hi-tech Greenhouse Seedling Centre, established 17.12.2013.
10. Nuh district: Center of Excellence for Onions, Pinangwan, established 2022.
11. Palwal district: Integrated Horticulture Development, Centre, Hodal, established 13.10.2018.
12. Mahendergarh district: Integrated Horticulture Development Centre, Sundrah village on Ateli-Kanina road, established 01.09.2019.
13. Bhiwani district: Centre of excellence for semi-arid horticulture, Gignaw, established 2022.
14. Hisar district: Multi Crops Demonstration Centre, Barwala, established 2022.
15. Hisar district: Date Palm and Guava Demonstration Centre, announced in FY2025-26.
16. Fatehabad district: Guava Demonstration Centre at Government Garden Nursery on Uklana road, Bhuna, established 27.10.2020.
17. Sirsa district: Centre of Excellence for fruits (Citrus & Pomegranate), Mangiana, established 22.06.2013.

== See also ==
- List of institutions of higher education in Haryana
