= Mahatma Gandhi Institute for Rural Industrialization =

Autonomous institution located in Wardha, Maharashtra, India

Mahatma Gandhi Institute for Rural Industrialization Wardha
- Abbreviation: MGIRI
- Formation: 2008
- Headquarters: Wardha, Maharashtra, India
- Location: Wardha, Maharashtra, India, India
- Director: Dr. Ashutosh Murkute
- Website: www.mgiri.org

Mahatma Gandhi Institute for Rural Industrialization (MGIRI), Wardha, Maharashtra state of India is a national institute under the Ministry of Micro, Small and Medium Enterprises (MSME), Government of India. The vision of MGIRI is to support, upgrade and accelerates the process of rural industrialization in the country following Gandhian vision of sustainable village economy, self- sufficient in employment and amenities and to provide S&T inputs to make the rural products and services globally competitive.

== History ==
Mahatma Gandhi started the All India Village Industries Association (AIVIA) on 14 December 1934 in Wardha. The AIVIA got reorganized in Maganwadi, Wardha, Maharashtra, in a spacious orchard belonging to Seth Jamanalal Bajaj. Gandhiji stayed there with Kasturba during 1934–36 and supervised the works of AIVIA which became a hub of rural industrial activity with focus on research, production, training, extension, organization, propaganda and publication.

Jamanalal Bajaj Central Research Institute (JBCRI) was created in 1955 to carry forward the R&D works of AIVIA. From 1 April 1957, the Institute came under the Khadi and Village Industries Commission (KVIC), which was established in 1956. The objective of JBCRI was to carry on research and investigations into the problems of village industries and in particular the development of improved tools and techniques. When KVIC adopted a more inclusive definition of rural industries, which permitted infinite number of activities vide M. Ramakrishnayya Review Committee Report 1987, a new pattern of R&D support system became necessary. Thus revamping of JBCRI was become necessary to meet the technological challenges arising out of the above paradigm shift.

Mahatma Gandhi Institute for Rural Industrialization (MGIRI) at Wardha was developed during 2001–2008 by the collaborative efforts of KVIC and Indian Institute of Technology (IIT), Delhi. MGIRI was set up as a National institute under the Ministry of Micro, Small and Medium Enterprises, Govt. of India at the historical premises of Maganwadi, Wardha by revamping JBCRI. Its autonomous function started effectively from October 2008.

== Divisions ==
MGIRI, Wardha has six major sections catering to the generic areas of rural industrialization.

1. Khadi& Textile Industries (K&T)
2. ·Bio-processing and Herbal based Industries (B&H)
3. ·Rural Chemical Industries (RCI)
4. ·Rural Crafts and Engineering (RC&E)
5. Rural Infrastructure and Energy (REI)
6. · Management and Systems (M&S)

== Objectives ==
The main objectives of the institute as enunciated in its Memorandum of Association are

- To upgrade and accelerate the process of Rural Industrialization for sustainable village economy.
- To Attract professionals and experts to facilitate rural industries become globally competitive
- To Empower traditional artisans
- To Promote innovation and foster creativity in products and processes through pilot study/field trials
- To do R&D on alternative technology using local resources for sustainable rural development

== See also ==
- Ministry of MSME
- KVIC
- Genesis of MGIRI
- MGIRI Annual Report
