= Micro, Small and Medium Enterprises Development Act, 2006 =

Indian law that penalizes buyers of businesses who fail to pay as agreed

Parliament of India
- Enacted by: Parliament of India
- Status: In force

The Micro, Small and Medium Enterprises Development Act, 2006 is an Act of the Parliament of India. India has 63 million micro, small and medium enterprises which amount to nearly 30 per cent of the country Gross Domestic Product.

Industries are divided into two categories. Manufacturing and services. They are further divided into micro, small and medium. For both, manufacturing and services sectors, micro industries' capital requirements are under 1 Crore rupees and an annual turnover of less than 5 Crore rupees. Small industries shall have between 50 and 250 Crores respectively.

According to the act, any buyer who fails to make payment to MSMEs, as per agreed terms or a maximum of 45 days, is liable to pay monthly compounded interest that is three times the bank rates as per RBI". In February 2023, the Consortium of Indian Associations (CIA) suggested to the government to form a separate ministry for the self-employed and microenterprises.
