= Nazi elite schools =

Type of Nazi-era school

During the National Socialist era in Germany, the NS selective schools (German: NS-Ausleseschulen) served to recruit and train young Nazi Party members. There were three types of selective schools:

The National Political Institutes of Education (German: Nationalpolitische Erziehungsanstalt; NPEA, popularly: Napola) were under the patronage of the SA, SS and the Wehrmacht. There were about 35 of these. By 1941, about 6,000 students are said to have attended these institutions.

The Adolf Hitler Schools (AHS) under the supervision of the German Labor Front and the Hitler Youth were Nazi Party schools and not under the Reich Ministry of Education. From 1941, the party-owned schools were referred to as Reich schools (German: Reichsschulen).

The Reichsschule Feldafing of the NSDAP was an outstanding exceptional school for the declared training of future leaders for the highest state and social management tasks in the sense of the then prevailing Nazi ideology. This was initially called the National Socialist German High School Starnberger See as a private school of the supreme SA leadership and the National Socialist Teachers League as well as the Nazi Party.
