= Ministry of Micro, Small, and Medium Enterprises (Indonesia) =

Government ministry of Indonesia

- Kementerian Usaha Mikro, Kecil, dan Menengah Republik Indonesia

Ministry overview
- Formed: 21 October 2024
- Jurisdiction: Government of Indonesia
- Minister responsible: Maman Abdurrahman, Ministry of Micro, Small, and Medium Enterprises
- Deputy Minister responsible: Helvi Yuni Moraza, Deputy Ministry of Micro, Small, and Medium Enterprises
- Parent department: Coordinating Ministry for Social Empowerment
- Website: umkm.go.id

The Ministry of Micro, Small, and Medium Enterprises of the Republic of Indonesia (Indonesian: Kementerian Usaha Mikro, Kecil, dan Menengah) is a ministry that organizes government affairs in the field of small and medium enterprises and the micro business government sub-department which is the scope of government affairs in the field of small and medium enterprises.

This ministry was established by Indonesian President Prabowo Subianto in the Red and White Cabinet in October 2024.

== Duties and Functions ==
The ministry has the task of organizing government affairs in the field of small and medium enterprises and the sub-ruling of micro-enterprise government which is the scope of government affairs in the field of small and medium enterprises to assist the President in organizing the government of the country. The ministry carries out the following functions:

1. formulation and determination of policies in the field of micro-enterprises, small businesses, medium businesses, and entrepreneurship;
2. coordination and synchronization of policy implementation in the field of micro, small, medium and entrepreneurship businesses;
3. coordination of task implementation, coaching, and provision of administrative support to all organizational elements within the Ministry;
4. management of state property/assets that are the responsibility of the Ministry;
5. supervision of task implementation within the Ministry; and
6. implementation of other functions assigned by the President.

== Organizational structure ==
The organizational structure of the Ministry consists of:

- Office of the Ministry of Micro, Small, and Medium Enterprises
- Office of the Deputy Ministry of Micro, Small, and Medium Enterprises
- Office of the Secretariat of the Ministry of Micro, Small, and Medium Enterprises
- Deputy for Micro Enterprises
- Deputy for Small Enterprises
- Deputy for Medium Enterprises
- Deputy for Entrepreneurship
- Inspectorate
- Board of Experts
  - Senior Expert to the Minister for Communication and Inter-Institutional Relations
  - Senior Expert to the Minister for Startups and Digital Economy
  - Senior Expert to the Minister for Law and Public Policy
