= Khadi and Village Industries Commission =

Indian government commission promoting khadi and village industries in rural areas

- Company type: Public
- Founded: 1957 (69 years ago)
- Headquarters: Mumbai, Maharashtra, India
- Number of locations: 28 Zonal Offices
- Area served: India
- Key people: Manoj Kumar (Chairman)
- Owner: Ministry of Micro, Small and Medium Enterprises
- Website: www.kvic.gov.in

The Khadi and Village Industries Commission (KVIC) is a statutory body formed in April 1957 by the Government of India, under the Act of Parliament, 'Khadi and Village Industries Commission Act of 1956'. It is an apex organisation under the Ministry of Micro, Small and Medium Enterprises, with regard to khadi and village industries within India, which seeks to — "plan, promote, facilitate, organise and assist in the establishment and development of khadi and village industries in the rural areas in coordination with other agencies engaged in rural development wherever necessary".

In April 1957, it took over the work of former All India Khadi and Village Industries Board. It has its head office in Mumbai, and six zonal offices in Delhi, Bhopal, Bengaluru, Kolkata, Mumbai and Guwahati. Other than its zonal offices, it has offices in 28 states for the implementation of its various programmes.

== Important terms ==
=== Khadi ===
"The livery of freedom" – Mahatma Gandhi

Khadi, (pronounced Khādī) refers to hand-spun and hand-woven cloth. The raw materials may be cotton, silk, or wool, which are spun into threads on a charkha (a traditional spinning implement).

Khadi was launched in 1920 as a political weapon in the Swadeshi movement of Mahatma Gandhi.

Khadi is sourced from different parts of India, depending upon its raw materials - While the silk variety is sourced from West Bengal, Bihar, Odisha and North Eastern states, the cotton variety comes from Andhra Pradesh, Uttar Pradesh, Bihar and West Bengal. Khadi poly is spun in Gujarat and Rajasthan while Haryana, Himachal Pradesh and Jammu and Kashmir Karnataka are known for the woolen variety.

There are a wide range of Khadi personal care products manufactured in Uttarakhand Khadi Products - Handmade and Natural

==== Trademark ====
Khadi and Village Industries Commission holds the exclusive rights to use the trademark "Khadi" and "Khadi India". The National Internet Exchange of India Domain Dispute Policy (INDRP) Arbitration Tribunal in New Delhi rejected the contention of a private entity that "Khadi" is a generic word.

=== Village Industry ===
Any Industry that is located within a rural area, where the Fixed Capital Investment per Artisan (weaver) does not exceed One hundred thousand Rupees. The Fixed Capital Investment can be changed by the Government of India whenever it so requires.

== Objectives of the Commission ==
The commission has three main objectives which guide its functioning. These are -

- The Social Objective - Providing employment in rural areas
- The Economic Objective - Providing saleable articles
- The Wider Objective - Creating self-reliance amongst people and building up a strong rural community spirit.

The commission seeks to achieve these objectives by implementing and monitoring various schemes and programs.

== Implementation of Schemes and Programs ==
The process of Implementation of schemes and programs starts at the Ministry of Micro, Small and Medium Enterprises which is the administrative head of the programs. The Ministry receives funds from the Government of India, and routes these to the Khadi and Village Industries Commission for the implementation of programs and schemes related to Khadi and Village Industries.

The Khadi and Village Industries Commission then uses these funds to implement its programs either directly - Through its 29 state offices, by directly funding Khadi and Village institutions and co-operatives, or indirectly through 33 Khadi and Village Industries Boards, which are statutory bodies formed by the state governments within India, set up for the purpose of promoting Khadi and Village Industries in their respective states. The Khadi and Village Industries Boards, in turn, fund Khadi and Village Institutions/Co-operatives/Entrepreneurs.

At present the developmental programmes of the commission are executed through, 5,600 registered institutions, 30,138 Cooperative societies and about ~95 lakh people.

== Schemes and Programs of the Commission ==
=== Prime Ministers Employment Generation Program (PMEGP) ===
Launched on 14 August 2008

The Prime Minister's Employment Generation Programme (PMEGP) the result of the merger of two schemes - Prime Minister's Rojgar Yojana (PMRY) and The Rural Employment Generation Programme (REGP).

Rural beneficiaries receive up to a 25% margin compensation in rural areas and 15% in urban areas for the general category and 35% in rural areas and 25% in urban areas for SCs, STs, OBCs, minorities and women among other special categories. A detailed project report prepared by a Chartered Accountant is mandatory for all PMEGP loan applications as per KVIC guidelines.

=== Interest Subsidy Eligibility Certification Scheme (ISEC) ===
The Interest Subsidy Eligibility Certificate (ISEC) Scheme is the major source of funding for the Khadi programme. It was introduced in May 1977 to mobilise funds from banking institutions to fill the gap in the actual fund requirement and its availability from budgetary sources.

Under this scheme, loans are provided by the banks to the members to meet their working/fixed capital requirements. These loans are provided at a concessional interest rate of 4% p.a. The difference between the actual interest rate and the concessional rate is borne by the commission under the 'grants' head of its budget. However, only members producing Khadi or Polyvastra (a type of Khadi) are eligible for this scheme.

=== Rebate Scheme ===
The rebate on sales of Khadi and Khadi products is made available by the Government so as to make the price of Khadi and Khadi products competitive with other textiles. Normal rebate (10 per cent) all through the year and an additional special rebate (10 per cent) for 108 days in a year, is given to the customers.

The rebate is allowed only on the sales made by the institutions/centers run by the Commission/State Boards and also at the sales centers run by the registered institutions which are engaged in the production of Khadi and polyvastra.

Recently, the finance ministry has asked the micro, small and medium enterprises ministry to redraw its rebate scheme for Khadi and village industries. Its view is that the "ministry should approach the plan commission and not seek year-to-year extension of the scheme. Furthermore, it has asked the MSME ministry to redesign the scheme in a manner that it should benefit the artisan and not the seller, which (has been) the case so far" With regard to this, A proposal received from the commission for introducing Market Development Assistance as a possible alternative to Rebate on Sale is being considered by the Government.

== Budgetary Support to the Commission ==
The Union Government through the Ministry of Micro, Small and Medium Enterprises, provides funds to the Commission under two heads: Plan and Non – Plan. The funds provided under the 'Plan' Head are allocated by the commission to its implementing agencies. The funds provided under the 'Non – Plan' head are mainly for the commission's administrative expenditure. Funds are provided mainly by a way of Grants and Loans.

=== Grants ===
A major part of the Khadi grant is being utilised for the payment of sales rebate, which is considered a promotional expenditure. Other expenditures under this head are: Training, Publicity, Marketing, Interest Subsidy on bank loans under ISEC scheme

=== Loans ===
Expenditures under this head include: Working Capital Expenditure and Fixed Capital Expenditure. Fixed Capital expenditure further consists of expenditure on -

a) Machinery.....1000000 b) Implements....500000 c) Work sheds....250000 d) Sales Outlets etc.250000

== Sales of Khadi and Village Industry Products ==
The products produced by the institutions are either sold by them directly, through the government.

In total, there are 15,431 sales outlets, out of which 7,050 are owned by the commission. These are spread all over India. The products are also sold internationally through exhibitions arranged by the commission.

== See also ==
- National Charkha Museum
- Ministry of Micro, Small and Medium Enterprises
- Mahatma Gandhi Institute for Rural Industrialization
