= National Charkha Museum =

Spinning wheel museum in Connaught Place, New Delhi, India

Coordinates: 28°37′53.134″N 77°13′2.646″E

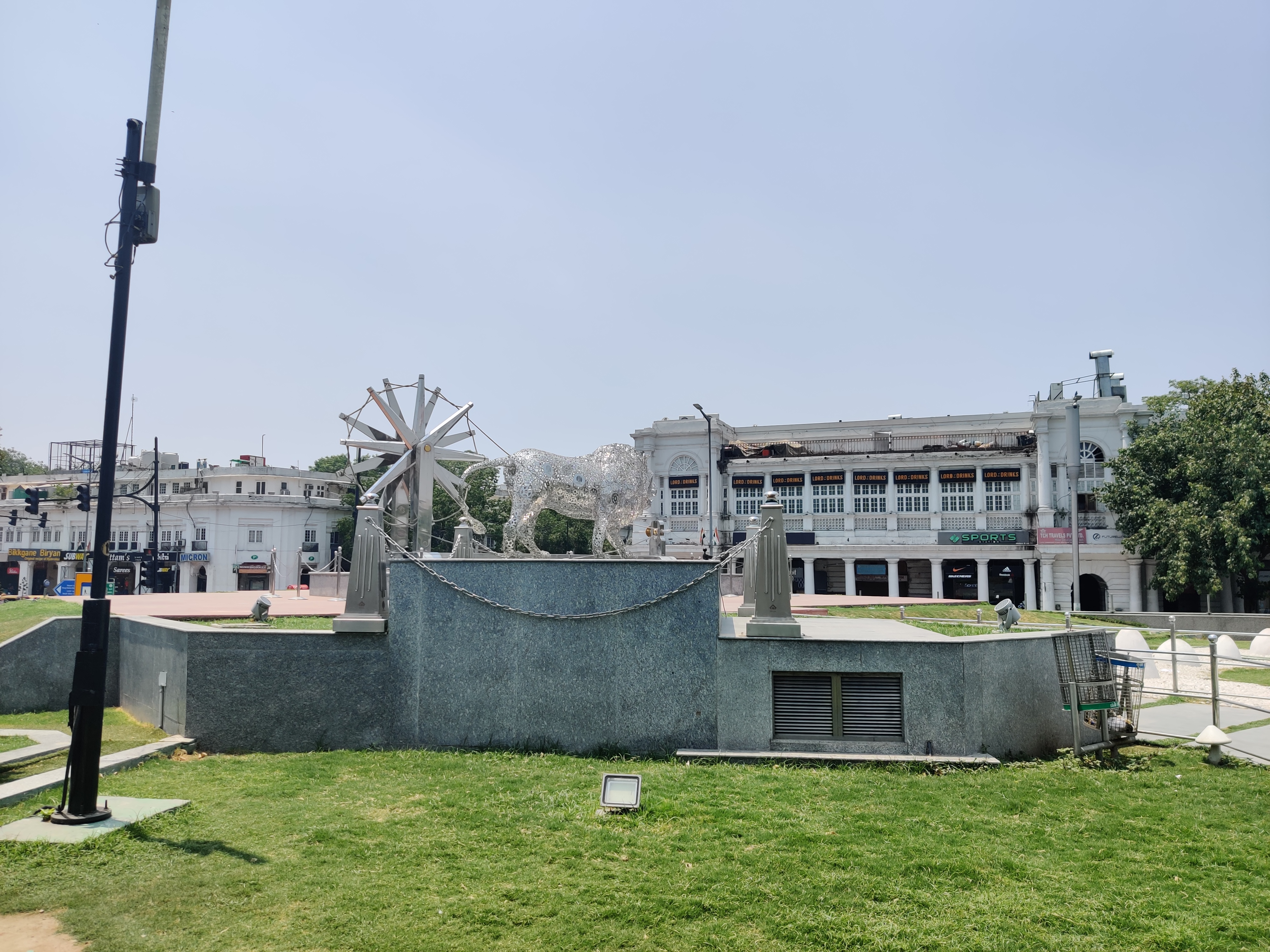
- Front view of the museum.
- Established: 21 May 2017
- Location: Connaught Place, New Delhi

The National Charkha Museum is a spinning wheel museum located in Connaught Place, New Delhi. This has been built on the already built garden in Palika Bazaar. It has been jointly constructed by the New Delhi Municipal Council and the Khadi Development and Village Industries Commission. The Museum was inaugurated on 21 May 2017, by the then BJP National President Amit Shah.

The museum features 26 feet (7.9 meters) long and 13 feet (4.0 meters) high chromium stainless steel spinning wheel (charkha). It is weighing five tons and there is no effect of heat on it. Also it is rust resistant and non-magnetic. This Charkha is the world's largest spinning wheel. This museum depicts the history and evolution of Charkha, from a humble instrument to a symbol of Nationalism. This tool or machine empowered Indian citizens, as they started weaving indigenous (made in India) cloths using the Charkha. The museum has a nominal entry fee of Rs 20. It was established by The president of BJP Amit Shah on 21 May 2017. It has been jointly constructed by New Delhi Municipal Council and the Khadi Development and Village Industries Commission.
