= Rasul, Punjab =

Coordinates: 32°42′0″N 73°34′0″E

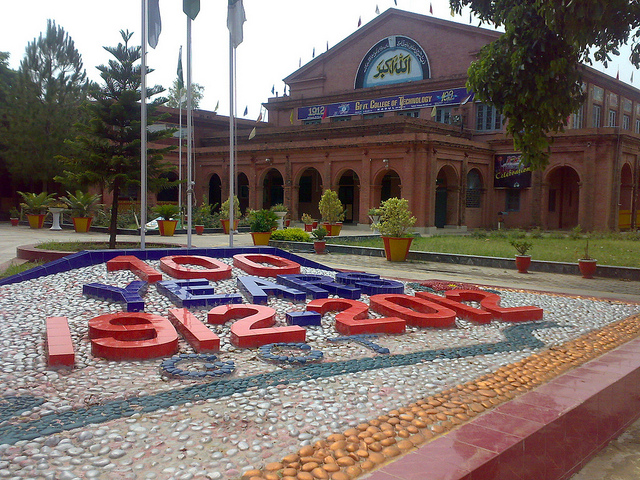
Government College of Technology, Rasul

Rasul is a village and Union Council of Mandi Bahauddin District in the Punjab province of Pakistan. It has an altitude of 233m (767 feet). Rasul is a river crossing on the Jhelum River. The town has a university named University of Engineering and Technology, Rasul and a power station.

The Battle of Chillianwala during the Second Anglo-Sikh War was fought in Rasul and the nearby village of Chillianwala on 13 January 1849.
