= Umri, Kurukshetra =

Umri
- village
- Location in Haryana, India Umri (India)
- Coordinates: 29.947908°N 76.896879°E
- Country: India
- State: Haryana
- District: Kurukshetra

Languages
  - Official: Hindi
- Time zone: UTC+5:30 (IST)
- PIN: 136131
- Telephone code: 01744
- ISO 3166 code: IN-HR
- Vehicle registration: HR-07
- Nearest city: Kurukshetra
- Lok Sabha constituency: Kurukshetra
- Vidhan Sabha constituency: Ladwa
- Website: haryana.gov.in

Umri, Kurukshetra, according to the Puranas, is a village named after Odaumbar Rishi as it was his taposthali.

== Transport ==
- By road: Buses of Haryana Roadways and other state corporations ply through Umri and connect it to Delhi, Chandigarh and other important places. Taxi service is also available.
- By air: The airports closest to Umri (Kurukshetra) are at Delhi and Chandigarh, which are well connected by road and rail.
- By rail: Umri (Kurukshetra) railway station is a railway junction station, well connected with all important towns and cities of the country. The Shatabadi Express halts here. Dhoda Kheri, Dhirpur, Dhola Majra Shahabad Markanda and Mohri are the railway stations between Kurukshetra to Ambala of Indian railway route.

== Higher education ==
- Govt Senior Secondary School, Umri
- Govt. Industrial Training Institute, Umri
- Govt. Polytechnic, Umri
- National Institute of Electronics & Information Technology, Kurukshetra
- National Institute of Design, Kurukshetra
