= Ministry of Micro, Small and Medium Enterprises =

Government ministry of India

- Branch of Government of India

- Ministry of Micro, Small and Medium Enterprises

Agency overview
- Jurisdiction: Government of India
- Headquarters: Ministry of Micro, Small and Medium Enterprises कर्तव्य भवन - 3 Kartavya Path New Delhi, 110011
- Annual budget: ₹22,138 crore (US$2.3 billion) (2023–24 est.)
- Ministers responsible: Jitan Ram Manjhi, Cabinet Minister; Shobha Karandlaje, Minister of State
- Website: msme.gov.in

The Ministry of Micro, Small and Medium Enterprises is the ministry in the Government of India. It is the apex executive body for the formulation and administration of rules, regulations and laws relating to micro, small and medium enterprises in India. The Minister of Micro, Small and Medium Enterprises is Jitan Ram Manjhi.

The statistics provided by the annual reports of the Ministry of Small and Medium Enterprises (MSME) shows a rise in the plan amount spent on the khadi sector from ₹1942.7 million to ₹14540 million, and non-plan amounts from ₹437 million to ₹2291 million, in the period from 1994–95 to 2014–15. The interest subsidies to khadi institutions increased from ₹96.3 million to ₹314.5 million in this period.

== History ==
The Ministry of Small Scale Industries and Agro and Rural Industries was created in October 1999. In September 2001, the ministry was split into the Ministry of Small Scale Industries and the Ministry of Agro and Rural Industries. The President of India amended the Government of India (Allocation of Business) Rules, 1961, under the notification dated 9 May 2007. Pursuant to this amendment, they were merged into a single ministry.

The ministry was tasked with the promotion of micro and small enterprises. The Small Industries Development Organisation was under the control of the ministry, as was the National Small Industries Corporation Limited public sector undertaking).

The Small Industries Development Organisation was established in 1954. It has over 60 offices and 21 autonomous bodies under its management. These autonomous bodies include Tool Rooms, Training Institutions and Project-cum-Process Development Centres.

Services provided include:

- Facilities for testing, toolmenting, training for entrepreneurship development
- Preparation of project and product profiles
- Technical and managerial consultancy
- Assistance for exports
- Pollution and energy audits

It also provides economic information services and advises Government in policy formulation for the promotion and development of SSIs. The field offices also work as effective links between the Central and State Governments.

=== Ministry of Agro and Rural Industries ===
The now-defunct Ministry of Agro and Rural Industries had the objectives of facilitating coordinated and focused policy formulation and effective implementation of programmes, projects, schemes, etc., for improving supply chain management, enhancing skills, upgrading technology, expanding markets and capacity building of entrepreneurs/artisans and their groups/collectives.

The Ministry deals with the khadi, village and coir industries through the Khadi and Village Industries Commission (KVIC) and the Coir Board. It coordinates implementation of two countrywide employment generation programmes, namely, the Rural Employment Generation Programme (REGP) and the Prime Minister's Rozgar Yojana (PMRY) with the cooperation of State Governments, the Reserve Bank of India (RBI) and other banks. The KVIC, established by an Act of Parliament, is a statutory organisation engaged in promotion and development of khadi and village industries for providing employment opportunities in the rural areas, thereby strengthening the rural economy. The coir industry is a labour-intensive and export-oriented industry. It uses a by-product of coconut, namely, coir husk. The Coir Board, a statutory body established under the Coir Industry Act 1953, looks after the promotion, growth and development of the coir industry, including export promotion and expansion of the domestic market.

It was headed by the Minister of Agro & Rural Industries and was based at Kartavya Bhavan-3, Kartavya Path, New Delhi. Shri Mahabir Prasad was the last incumbent.

==== Related organisations ====
- MSME-Technology Centre Baddi Solan
- Central Tool Room, Ludhiana
- Central Tool Room Extension Centre, Nilokheri earlier functional as Integrated Training Centre, Nilokheri
- Indo Danish Tool Room, Jamshedpur
- National Small Industries Corporation
- Coir Board

== Wings, Divisions and Sections ==
=== DATC/HR/CDN/OL Division ===
- Data Analystics and Technical Coordination Section
- Official Language Section
- Human Resource Section
- Coordination Section

=== Information Technology, Planning and Direct Benefit Transfer Division ===
- Cyber Security Section
- NIC Section
- Digital Governance
- Parliament Section

=== Agro Rural Industries Division ===
- Coir Section
- Khadi and Village Industries Sections-1 & 2
- PM-Employment Generation Programme (PMEGP) Section

=== Administrative and Financial Institutions Division ===
- Vigilance Section
- Cash Section
- General Administrative Section
- Protocol Section
- RTI & Public Grievance Section

=== Small and Medium Enterprises Division ===
- International Cooperation Section
- Small and Medium Enterprises Section
- Enterpreneurship Development Institution Section
- Women Entrepreneurship Cell
- Media Section

== Attached Offices ==
- OFFICE OF DEVELOPMENT COMMISSIONER (MSME)
- KHADI VILLAGE INDUSTRIES COMMISSION (KVIC)
- COIR BOARD
- NATIONAL SMALL INDUSTRIES CORPORATION LIMITED (NSIC)
- NATIONAL INSTITUTE FOR MICRO, SMALL AND MEDIUM ENTERPRISES (NIMSME)
- MAHATMA GHANDI INSTITUE OF RURAL INDUSTRALISATION (MGIRI)

== Training institutes ==
MSME's Central Tool Room and Training Centre at 9th Bengaluru Space Expo 2026, BIEC

- Central Tool Room & Training Centre, (CTTC), Bhubaneswar

http://www.cttc.gov.in

- Indo Danish Tool Room, (IDTR), Jamshedpur

https://www.idtr.gov.in

- Central Tool Room & Training Centre, (CTTC), Kolkata

http://www.msmetoolroomkolkata.com

- Tool Room & Training Centre (TRTC), Guwahati

http://trtcguwahati.org

- Indo German Tool Room, (IGTR), Aurangabad

http://www.igtr-aur.org

- Indo German Tool Room, (IGTR), Indore

http://www.igtr-indore.com

- Indo German Tool Room, (IGTR), Ahmedabad

http://www.igtrahd.com

- Central Institute of Hand Tools (CIHT), Jalandhar

http://www.ciht.in

- Central Institute of Tool Design (CITD), Hyderabad

https://www.citdindia.org

- Institute for Design of Electrical Measuring Instruments (IDEMI), Mumbai

https://idemi.org

- Electronics Service & Training Centre (ESTC), Ramnagar

http://www.estcindia.com

- Process and Product Development Centre (PPDC), Agra

http://www.ppdcagra.dcmsme.gov.in/

- Fragrance & Flavour Development Centre (FFDC), Kannauj

http://www.ffdcindia.org

- Central Footwear Training Institute (CFTI) Agra

http://www.cftiagra.org.in

- Central Footwear Training Institute (CFTI) Chennai

http://www.cftichennai.in

- Process cum Product Development Centre (PPDC), Meerut

http://www.ppdcmeerut.com/contact.html

- Central Tool Room (CTR), Ludhiana

http://www.ctrludhiana.com

- Centre For Development Of Glass industry (CDGI), Firozabad

https://www.cdgiindia.net/

*	National Institute for Micro, Small and Medium Enterprises (ni-msme)	
http://www.nimsme.org

== Integrated Training Centre, Nilokheri ==
Integrated Training Centre, Nilokheri was an employment and training agency in Nilokheri in Karnal district in the state of Haryana owned and managed by the Government of India and responsible for upgrading technical skills of technicians.

It was built around the vocational training centre that was transferred from Kurukshetra, in July 1948 to the 1100 acres of swampy land on the Delhi-Ambala highway as one of several enterprises intended to provide employment and training for displaced persons following the partition of India This training centre was under Small Industries belonged to subhash mukherjee Development Organisation and used to provided training to extension officers (industries of State Governments as well as managers and technician entrepreneurs both in modern small scale and traditional village industries. During the Year 1986-87 the centre trained 200 technician, 85 women under core women training programme and 57 SIDO officers.

=== Functions ===
It provides technical training to artisans and workers sponsored by the state government. It also organises training of Extension Officers engaged in various developmental organisation. It provides summer training programs for Degree/Diploma Engineers.

=== ITC as Central Tool Room Extension Centre, Nilokheri ===
Due to some conflict between the Principal and Vice-Principal of Integrated Training Centre was relinquished. Later in the year 2014 the center was taken over by Ministry of Micro, Small and Medium Enterprises which led to its development as Extension center for Central Tool Room, Ludhiana i.e. Central Tool Room Extension Center, Nilokheri. Currently running various technical short term courses.

== Centre structure and functions ==
The Indian Enterprise Development Service is the cadre of officers of the DoMSME. The IEDS cadre was approved to be created in 2016 through the merger of 11 existing trades of the Ministry of MSME.

The Ministry regulates:

- Khadi and Village Industries Commission
- National Commission for Enterprises in the Unorganised Sector
- National Small Industries Corporation Ltd.
- National School of Leadership
- National Institute for Micro, Small and Medium Enterprises
- National Institute for Entrepreneurship & Small Business Development
- Indian Institute of Entrepreneurship

== Initiatives ==
=== Prime Minister Employment Generation Programme ===
It was launched as a central sector scheme in 2008–09 to promote self employment in the country through setting up micro enterprises. It is a credit linked subsidy scheme in which loans up to 25 lakh for manufacturing sector and up to 1000 Lakh for service sector is forwarded to the eligible beneficiaries for which subsidy of up to 35% is provided to them.

The Khadi and Village Industries Commission is the implementing agency at the National level. The individuals who are above the age of 18 years and are at least 8th pass, self help groups, Societies registered under Societies Registration Act, 1860, Charitable trusts are all eligible to be beneficiary. Also, only new projects are considered for sanction under the scheme.

== Cabinet Ministers ==
No.	Portrait	Minister (Birth-Death) Constituency	Term of office			Political party	Ministry	Prime Minister
No.	Portrait	Minister (Birth-Death) Constituency	From	To	Period	Political party	Ministry	Prime Minister
Minister of Small Scale Industries, and Agro and Rural Industries
1		Vasundhara Raje (born 1953); MP for Jhalawar (MoS, I/C)	13 October 1999	1 September 2001	1 year, 323 days	Bharatiya Janata Party	Vajpayee III	Atal Bihari Vajpayee
Minister of Small Scale Industries						Bharatiya Janata Party	Vajpayee III	Atal Bihari Vajpayee
(1)		Vasundhara Raje (born 1953); MP for Jhalawar (MoS, I/C)	1 September 2001	29 January 2003	1 year, 150 days	Bharatiya Janata Party	Vajpayee III	Atal Bihari Vajpayee
2		C. P. Thakur (born 1931); MP for Patna	29 January 2003	22 May 2004	1 year, 114 days	Bharatiya Janata Party	Vajpayee III	Atal Bihari Vajpayee
Minister of Agro and Rural Industries						Bharatiya Janata Party	Vajpayee III	Atal Bihari Vajpayee
3		Kariya Munda (born 1936); MP for Khunti	1 September 2001	29 January 2003	1 year, 150 days	Bharatiya Janata Party	Vajpayee III	Atal Bihari Vajpayee
4		Sangh Priya Gautam (born 1931); Rajya Sabha MP for Uttarakhand (MoS, I/C)	29 January 2003	22 May 2004	1 year, 114 days	Bharatiya Janata Party	Vajpayee III	Atal Bihari Vajpayee
Minister of Small Scale Industries and Agro and Rural Industries
5		Mahaveer Prasad (1939–2010); MP for Bansgaon	23 May 2004	9 May 2007	2 years, 351 days	Indian National Congress	Manmohan I	Manmohan Singh
Minister of Micro, Small and Medium Enterprises
(5)		Mahaveer Prasad (1939–2010); MP for Bansgaon	9 May 2007	22 May 2009	2 years, 13 days	Indian National Congress	Manmohan I	Manmohan Singh
6		Dinsha Patel (born 1937); MP for Kheda (MoS, I/C)	28 May 2009	19 January 2011	1 year, 236 days	Indian National Congress	Manmohan II	Manmohan Singh
7		Virbhadra Singh (1934–2021); MP for Mandi	19 January 2011	26 June 2012	1 year, 159 days	Indian National Congress	Manmohan II	Manmohan Singh
8		Vilasrao Deshmukh (1945–2012); Rajya Sabha MP for Maharashtra	26 June 2012	10 August 2012	45 days	Indian National Congress	Manmohan II	Manmohan Singh
9		Vayalar Ravi (born 1937); Rajya Sabha MP for Kerala	10 August 2012	28 October 2012	79 days	Indian National Congress	Manmohan II	Manmohan Singh
10		K. H. Muniyappa (born 1948); MP for Kolar (MoS, I/C)	28 October 2012	26 May 2014	1 year, 210 days	Indian National Congress	Manmohan II	Manmohan Singh
11		Kalraj Mishra (born 1941); MP for Deoria	27 May 2014	3 September 2017	3 years, 99 days	Bharatiya Janata Party	Modi I	Narendra Modi
12		Giriraj Singh (born 1957); MP for Nawada (MoS, I/C)	3 September 2017	30 May 2019	1 year, 269 days	Bharatiya Janata Party	Modi I	Narendra Modi
13		Nitin Gadkari (born 1957); MP for Nagpur	31 May 2019	7 July 2021	2 years, 37 days	Bharatiya Janata Party	Modi II	Narendra Modi
14		Narayan Rane (born 1952); Rajya Sabha MP for Maharashtra	7 July 2021	9 June 2024	2 years, 338 days	Bharatiya Janata Party	Modi II	Narendra Modi
15		Jitan Ram Manjhi (born 1944); MP for Gaya	10 June 2024	Incumbent	2 years, 104 days	Hindustani Awam Morcha (Secular)	Modi III	Narendra Modi

== Ministers of State ==
No.	Portrait	Minister (Birth-Death) Constituency	Term of office			Political party	Ministry	Prime Minister
No.	Portrait	Minister (Birth-Death) Constituency	From	To	Period	Political party	Ministry	Prime Minister
Minister of State for Small Scale Industries						Bharatiya Janata Party	Vajpayee III	Atal Bihari Vajpayee
1		Tapan Sikdar (1944–2014); MP for Dum Dum	29 January 2003	22 May 2004	1 year, 114 days	Bharatiya Janata Party	Vajpayee III	Atal Bihari Vajpayee
Minister of State for Agro and Rural Industries						Bharatiya Janata Party	Vajpayee III	Atal Bihari Vajpayee
2		Nikhil Kumar Choudhary (born 1949); MP for Katihar	1 July 2002	29 January 2003	212 days	Bharatiya Janata Party	Vajpayee III	Atal Bihari Vajpayee
Minister of State for Micro, Small and Medium Enterprises
3		Giriraj Singh (born 1957); MP for Nawada	9 November 2014	3 September 2017	2 years, 298 days	Bharatiya Janata Party	Modi I	Narendra Modi
4		Haribhai Parthibhai Chaudhary (born 1954); MP for Banaskantha	5 July 2016	3 September 2017	1 year, 60 days	Bharatiya Janata Party	Modi I	Narendra Modi
5		Pratap Chandra Sarangi (born 1955); MP for Balasore	31 May 2019	7 July 2021	2 years, 37 days	Bharatiya Janata Party	Modi II	Narendra Modi
6		Bhanu Pratap Singh Verma (born 1957); MP for Jalaun	7 July 2021	9 June 2024	2 years, 338 days	Bharatiya Janata Party	Modi II	Narendra Modi
7		Shobha Karandlaje (born 1966); MP for Bangalore North	10 June 2024	Incumbent	2 years, 104 days	Bharatiya Janata Party	Modi III	Narendra Modi

== International MSME Day : 27 June ==
Micro, Small, and Medium Enterprises Day (MSME Day) is observed globally on June 27. It was officially designated by the United Nations General Assembly in 2017 through Resolution A/71/279. In India, MSME Day is observed as "Udyami Bharat – MSME Day," highlighting the role of entrepreneurship in the country’s economy. The 2025 theme was "Enhancing the Role of MSMEs as Drivers of Sustainable Growth and Innovation." The 2025 event in India was notably attended by President Droupadi Murmu at Vigyan Bhawan, New Delhi.

== See also ==
- Ministry of Small Scale Industries
