= List of institutions of higher education in Haryana =

As of January 2026, Haryana state in India has at least 66 functional universities, including 1 international, 12 Institutes of National Importance (INI), 27 public universities including 24 state and 3 central universities, and 26 private universities. Additionally, more than two dozen public and private universities are in the varying stages of being formally established which also includes Haryana Government's 2025-26 budget plan of establishing state universities in the remaining 4 districts which do not yet have a university, namely Charkhi Dadri, Hansi, Fatehabad, and Nuh. Many more universities that have been announced or planned, but have not yet commenced the formal process of establishment, are not included here.

== Institutes of National Importance (INI) ==
AIIMS Rewari (Majra): Now fully recognized and functional for academic sessions, yet often omitted from the main INI table.

University	Location	Type	Established	Specialisation	Sources
AIIMS Rewari	Rewari (Majra)	Central (INI)	2024	Medicine	
Central Research Institute of Yoga and Naturopathy (CRIYN)	Jhajjar (Deverkhana)	Central (INI)	2024	AYUSH	Act introduced in 2025 to make it an INI, likely to be passed in 2026.
Footwear Design and Development Institute (FDDI, Rohtak)	Rohtak	Central (INI)	2017	Footwear	
IIIT, Sonepat	Sonepat	Central (INI)	2014	Technology	
IIM, Rohtak	Rohtak	Central (INI)	2010	Business, Management	
IIT Delhi, Sonipat Campus	Sonipat	Central (INI)	2013	Technical	
National Brain Research Centre (NBRC, Manesar)	Gurugram (Manesar)	Deemed & Central	1997 (2002^{†})	Neuroscience	
National Dairy Research Institute (NDRI, Karnal)	Karnal	Deemed & Central	1923 (1989^{†})	Dairy	
National Institute of Design, Kurukshetra (NID, Kurukshetra)	Kurukshetra	Central (INI)	2016	Technology	
National Institute of Fashion Technology (NIFT, Panchkula)	Panchkula	Central (INI)	2019	Fashion Technology	
National Institute of Food Technology Entrepreneurship and Management (NIFTEM, Sonipat)	Sonipat	Central (INI)	2012	Technology	
National Institute of Technology (NIT, Kurukshetra)	Kurukshetra	Central (INI)	1963	Technology	

== International universities ==
University	Location	Type	Established	Specialisation	Sources
University of Southampton	Gurugram	International	2025	Management, Science, Law	

== Public universities ==
University	Location	Type	Established	Specialisation	Sources
Bhagat Phool Singh Mahila Vishwavidyalaya	Sonipat	State	2006	Women's only Genera University	
Central University of Haryana	Mahendragarh	Central	2009	General	
Chaudhary Bansi Lal University	Bhiwani	State	2014	General	
CCS Haryana Agricultural University	Hisar	State	1970	Agriculture	
Chaudhary Devi Lal University	Sirsa	State	2003	General	
Chaudhary Ranbir Singh University	Jind	State	2014	General	
Dada Lakhmi Chand State University of Performing and Visual Arts	Rohtak	State	2014	Art and Culture	
Deenbandhu Chhotu Ram University of Science and Technology	Sonipat	State	2006	Technology	
Gurugram University	Gurugram	State	2018	General	
Guru Jambheshwar University of Science and Technology	Hisar	State	1995	Science, Technology	
Haryana Institute of Civil Aviation	Hisar, Karnal and Kalka	State	1966	Aviation	
ICAR CIFE Rohtak (campus of Central Institute of Fisheries Education)	Rohtak (Lahli)	Deemed & Central	1996	Fisheries science	
Indira Gandhi University Meerpur, Rewari	Rewari	State	2013	General	
J.C. Bose University of Science and Technology	Faridabad	State	2009	Technology	
Kurukshetra University	Kurukshetra	State	1956	General	
Lala Lajpat Rai University of Veterinary and Animal Sciences	Hisar	State	2010	Veterinary medicine	
Maharana Pratap Horticultural University, Karnal	Karnal (Anjanthali)	State	2016	Horticulture	
Maharishi Balmiki Sanskrit University, Kaithal	Kaithal	State	2018	Sanskrit	
Maharshi Dayanand University	Rohtak	State	1976	General	
Sports University of Haryana	Sonipat district (Rai)	State	2014	Sports	
National Institute of Ayurveda, Panchkula	Panchkula	Deemed & Central	2019	AYUSH	
National Institute of Fashion Technology	Panchkula	State	2019	Fashion	
National Law University, Sonipat	Sonipat	State	2013	Law	
Pandit Bhagwat Dayal Sharma University of Health Sciences	Rohtak	State	2008	Healthcare	
Pandit Deen Dayal Upadhayaya University of Health Sciences	Karnal	State	2018	Healthcare	
Shri Krishna AYUSH University	Kurukshetra	State	2018	AYUSH	
Shri Vishwakarma Skill University	Palwal (Dudhola)	State	2017	Skills development	

== Private universities ==
There are 26 private universities as of December 2025.

University	Location	Type	Established	Specialisation	Sources
Al-Falah University	Faridabad	Private	1997 (2014^{†})	General	
Amity University, Haryana	Gurgaon	Private	2010	General	
Amrita Vishwa Vidyapeetham Haryana campus	Faridabad	Private	2023	Medical	
Apeejay Stya University	Gurgaon	Private	2010	General	
Ashoka University	Sonipat	Private	2013	General	
Baba Mast Nath University	Rohtak	Private	2012	General	
Bharti Vidyapeeth, Sonipat Campus	Sonipat	Private	2013	General	
BML Munjal University	Gurugram	Private	2014	General	
GD Goenka University	Gurgaon	Private	2013	General	
Geeta University	Panipat	Private	2022	General	
IILM University	Gurugram	Private	1993 (2018^{†})	Management	
Jagan Nath University	Jhajjar (Bahadurgarh)	Private	2013	General	
KR Mangalam University	Gurgaon	Private	2013	General	
Lingaya's University	Faridabad	Deemed & Private	1998 (2005^{†})	Technology, Management	
Maharishi Markandeshwar University, Mullana	Ambala	Deemed & Private	1993 (2007^{†})	General	
Manav Rachna International Institute of Research and Studies	Faridabad	Deemed & Private	1997 (2008^{†})	Technology, Management	
Manav Rachna University	Faridabad	Private	2014	General	
MVN University	Palwal	Private	2012	Technology, Management	
O. P. Jindal Global University	Sonipat	Private	2009	Social Science, Arts & Humanities	
NIILM University, Kaithal	Kaithal	Deemed & Private	1923 (2011^{†})	General	
Om Sterling Global University	Hisar	Private	2019	General	
PDM University	Bahadurgarh Jhajjar	Private	2016	Technology, Management	
Rishihood University	Sonipat	Private	2020	Education, Management, Healthcare, Design	
Sanskaram University	Jhajjar (Patauda)	Private	2023	Science, Management, Law, Arts	
Shree Guru Gobind Singh Tricentenary University, Budhera	Gurgaon	Private	2013	Medical	
Skyline Business School, Sonipat Campus	Sonipat	Private	2013	Management	
SRM University, Haryana	Sonipat	Private	2013	General	
Starex University	Gurgaon	Private	2016	General	
Sushant University Gurgaon	Gurgaon	Private	2012	Technology	
The NorthCap University	Gurgaon	Private	2009	Technology, Management, Law, Applied sciences	
World University of Design	Sonipat	Private	2006	Technology, Management, Law, Applied sciences	

^{†} granted deemed university status

== Satellite and Regional Centres in Haryana of non-Haryana universities ==
Haryana hosts study hubs of external universities, which can be categorized into Residential Satellite Campuses (full-scale physical campuses) and Non-Residential Regional Centres (administrative and support hubs).

=== Residential Satellite campuses ===
Residential Satellite campuses are full-scale physical campuses with permanent faculty, labs, hostel, etc.

- Public
  - AIIMS, Jhajjar at Badsa is a full residential campus housing "National Cancer Institute" (NCI).
  - IIT-D, Badsa Health-Tech Hub: co-located with AIIMS Jhajjar with own 50 acre campus offering residential PhD.
  - IIT-D, Sonepat I-Tech Technopark: It is a residential campus with own dedicated 50 acre campus inside the Rajiv Gandhi Education City for PhD researchers, startup incubator and executive education. It has large five-story Guest House Block with 140 double-sharing rooms and 10 aesthetically furnished suites. Startup Incubation centre is designed to house and incubate up to 100 startups, providing them with on-site residential facilities to foster a "live-work" ecosystem for entrepreneurs. Student Training accommodation who attend the short-term programs (like those at the Drone Technology Park or SATHI) can stay on-campus.
  - Rajiv Gandhi Institute of Petroleum Technology (RGIPT, Sonipat) Energy Centre: This is a specialized satellite campus of the main RGIPT Amethi which is an Institute of National Importance (INI) under the Ministry of Petroleum and Natural Gas. The Sonipat center focuses on renewable energy and offers programs such as Master of Technology (M.Tech) in Renewable Energy and Doctor of Philosophy (Ph.D.) in related energy disciplines.
- Private
  - <expand>

=== Non-Residential Regional Centres ===
Non-Residential Regional Centres are administrative and support hubs only without any faculty or residential hostel, etc. While central open universities like IGNOU dominate the distance landscape, other state open universities (e.g., UP Rajarshi Tandon) do not have official jurisdictions in Haryana, as public state open universities are generally restricted to their home state's borders. Conversely, private entities like "Thapar Institute of Engineering and Technology" (TIET) have established specialized non-residential executive hubs in Gurugram.

- Public
  - Indira Gandhi National Open University (IGNOU) Karnal and Panchkula Regional Centres: IGNOU maintains the most extensive non-residential network, with primary Regional Centres in Karnal and Panchkula overseeing nearly 100 Learner Support Centres across the state.
- Private
  - Thapar Institute of Engineering and Technology (TIET): It has established specialized non-residential executive hubs in Gurugram, while their flagship residential satellite campuses remain under their Punjab state private university charters while operating in Haryana.

== Planned universities ==
This list includes only those universities that either exist or have been notified but yet to be operationalised (i.e. commence admissions), or the act has been introduced in the Haryana Legislative Assembly for the creation of the said university but awaiting passing the law and the formal notification, of the letter of intent (LoI) has been. List excluded other announcements.

=== Process of establishing universities ===
The establishment of a private university in Haryana follows a rigid administrative-to-legislative sequence governed by the Haryana Private Universities Act, 2006.

- Stage-1: Application & proposal: The sponsoring body (a Trust or Society) submits a Detailed Project Report (DPR) and a non-refundable fee of ₹10 Lakh to the Department of Higher Education. They must already own the land (20 acres outside municipal limits or 10 acres within).

- Stage-2: Technical scrutiny: The State Government appoints an Expert Committee (usually including academic and administrative experts). They visit the site to verify land titles, financial sustainability, and the feasibility of the academic plan.

- Stage-3: Cabinet approval & Letter of Intent (LoI): If the committee gives a positive report, the proposal is sent to the State Cabinet. Once the Cabinet approves, the Department issues the Letter of Intent (LoI). This is merely an "intent" to allow the university. At this stage, the university has no legal power and cannot use the word "University" in its official letterhead for admissions.

- Stage-4: Compliance phase: The proposing body must also deposit ₹5 Crore as a permanent non-transferable pledge in favor of the government as an Endowment Fund. The body is given a specific timeframe (usually 1–2 years) to build the infrastructure such as minimum required built-up area (classrooms, labs, library) and hire the core faculty (VC, Registrar, and initial Professors) as per UGC norms.

- Stage-5: Verification & legislative tabling: Once the sponsoring body submits a "Compliance Report," the government conducts a final inspection. If satisfied, they draft a Private Universities (Amendment) Bill. This Bill proposes to add the university’s name to the Schedule of the 2006 Act.

- Stage-6: Legal establishment (Vidhan Sabha): The Bill is introduced in the Haryana Vidhan Sabha. Once the Assembly passes the Bill, the Governor of Haryana grants assent and it is officially notified, the university is officially "incorporated." It is only after this final stage that the university is listed on the UGC website and can legally grant its own degrees. A university cannot legally admit students under its own "University" brand until it reaches Stage 6 (Gazette Notification). Under the Haryana Private Universities Act, 2006, a sponsoring body is strictly prohibited from admitting students under its own "University" brand until it reaches Stage 6 (Gazette Notification). Legally, the entity does not exist as a university during the proposal or compliance phases (Stages 1–5), and any degrees issued for studies undertaken before formal incorporation are considered invalid by the University Grants Commission (UGC). To circumvent this, most upcoming institutions operate as affiliated colleges of an existing state university (such as MDU Rohtak) during the setup years, only transitioning their students to the "University" roll after the final legislative act is published in the official gazette.

=== International universities ===
- Queen’s University Belfast (UK) stage-1 Proposal for Gurugram is on hold while Queen’s University Belfast Gujarat's GIFT City is confirmed: It is among the 15+ international universities that have initiated talks with the UGC for a standalone campus. While they are a strong contender for the Gurugram corridor due to existing tie-ups with Haryana-based universities like O.P. Jindal, a final site location is still under review as of late 2025.

- Victoria University, Gurugram (Australia), stage-3 LOI Received/Construction, undergraduate admissions from July 2026: scheduled to open in mid-2026, it will utilize the "VU Block Model" (learning one subject at a time) for the first time in India.

=== Public universities ===
- CRM Jat University, Hisar (CRMJU, Hisar), stage-1: One of the oldest government-aided education society in Haryana with several operational colleges including the 22-acre main CRM JAT College as well as other urban institutes (CR Law College, C.R. College of Education, C.R. Senior Secondary School and Chhaju Ram Public School), it meets all the criteria of a state cluster university via the Special Act.

- Defence Manufacturing and Aviation University, Hisar (DMAU, Hisar), stage-3 Tech Scrutiny and DPR completed, admissions under own university brand likely from 2028 (interim admission by GJUST from 2026 under GJUST brand): This project is part of the Maharaja Agrasen International Airport, Hisar mega-project and the "Haryana Aerospace and Defence Production Policy, 2022". The university is planned for Phase-III of the Hisar Integrated Aviation Hub. While the Aerospace and Defence Production Policy explicitly mentions establishing this university, the physical construction of the dedicated university campus is secondary to the immediate operationalization of the international airport. As of January 2026, it is in the "Detailed Project Report: (DPR) & Stage-2 Scrutiny stage. The Detailed Project Report (DPR) and Master Plan for the aviation training and university zone were finalized and approved in late 2025, following the environmental clearance of the 980-acre first stage of the Integrated Manufacturing Cluster (IMC) in September 2025. Physical construction of the standalone campus is scheduled to commence in March 2027, following the formal transfer of the identified 100-acre land parcel from the Civil Aviation Department to the university society, which is expected to be completed by mid-2026. To ensure immediate operationalization, "Guru Jambheshwar University of Science and Technology" (GJUST), Hisar is serving as the official incubation hub, having received specific state budget allocations for the FY2025-26 to establish a foundational Aviation and Aerospace College. GJUST has already commenced admissions for specialized programs, including a B.Sc. in Aviation and M.Tech in Defence Technology, which will transition to the standalone university once it reaches Stage-6 legal establishment (target 2028). This academic framework is designed to work in tandem with the Haryana Institute of Civil Aviation (HICA), which will act as the university’s practical wing by providing existing flight training infrastructure and hangars for hands-on pilot and technical training.

- Government University, Nuh (GU, Nuh), stage-1 Preparation, admissions under own university brand likely from 2027 or 2028: The government started off land identification in the Nuh district in late 2024 to upgrade existing infrastructure (like the Mewat Engineering College) into a full-fledged State University. It will entail the waqf-run Mewat Engineering College (MEC) as the foundational "anchor" for the new university and the government has explored taking over or collaborating with the Waqf Board to transition MEC into a constituent college of the proposed state university allowing the university to start with ready-made labs, lecture halls, and 28 acres of campus. Yaseen Meo Degree College (YMD) and Shaheed Hasan Khan Mewati Government Medical College (Nalhar) are also key parts of the educational ecosystem in Nuh that are planned to be affiliated with or integrated into the new university's jurisdiction to consolidate the district's higher education. While MEC provides a "head start," the university requires significantly more land to meet the Haryana State University guidelines. The district administration has been tasked with identifying an additional 50–100 acres of land in villages like Palla or Nagina.

- Guru Brahmanand MSME University, Nilokheri (GBMU, Karnal), stage-5 Act, university admissions from August 2026: Announced to support the industrial belt of Karnal-Panipat, the bill to formally incorporate this as a state university is currently being processed to transition it from its existing polytechnic/institute framework into a full-scale MSME (Micro, Small and Medium Enterprises)-focused university. As of January 2026, it is in the Stage-5 legislative phase. Currently it runs as the "BN Polytechnic Nilokheri", and once the Stage-5 Bill is notified, the first MSME degree batch will be inducted directly under the university.

- Indian National Defence University (INDU, Gurugram), stage-5 Act, indefinite delay due to being ignored by BJP's central government and perhaps it may be operationalised if and when INC comes to power in centre: Notified in 2013 as a Central University focused on defence, has seen significant delays in operationalisation and a 2025 Public Accounts Committee (PAC) report criticized the Ministry of Defence for inordinate delays.

- Kalpana Chawla University of Health Sciences, Karnal (KCUHS, Kutail), stage-5 Verification/Scaling, admissions under own university brand from March 2026: While the medical college is operational, the transition into a specialized "Health University" that affiliates other medical colleges in the state is in the final administrative verification stage. In 2025, it admits Existing medical students under Pt. B.D. Sharma University. The new KCUHS university will start affiliating medical colleges across Haryana from the 2026-27 session.

- Haryana State University, Charkhi Dadri (GU, Charkhi Dadri), stage-1, university admissions under own university brand likely between 2028-30: "Government PG College in Charkhi Dadri", currently a designated "Model Degree College" with autonomous funding, has already completed a 50-acre extension with the view to convert it to a state university.

- Haryana State University, Fatehabad (GU, Fatehabad), stage-3 LOI, university admissions under own university brand likely between 2027-28: Government aided private institution Manohar Memorial (MM) PG College is proposed to be takeover by the government to form the nucleus of a Fatehabad State University, it already has the 22-acre campus which meets the university-formation criteria of minimum 20-acre rural or 10-acre urban land.

- Haryana State University, Hansi (HSUH), stage-5 Act, admissions under own university brand likely from 2028 or 2029: Following the official declaration of Hansi as Haryana’s 23rd district in December 2025, the government has proposed a dedicated state university to serve the new administrative region. As of January 2026, it is in the Stage-1 proposal phase. Government College Hansi currently operating as a "Postgraduate Hub" under GJU Hisar is planned to be converted to the cluster university (formed by pooling the resources of 3–5 existing colleges located in close proximity which share a common library, laboratories, and faculty, acting as a single multidisciplinary "University Hub") with legislation for Hansi State University is expected in the 2026-27 budget session.

- Maharaja Agrasen University of Health Sciences, Agroha (MAUHS, Hisar), stage-1 proposal, like by 2028: There are repeated demands to convert 267-acre campus housing government-aided co-located twin colleges, the Maharaja Agrasen Agroha Medical college and Vidya Devi Jindal Paramedical College (VDJPC), into Maharaja Agrasen University of Health Sciences.

=== Private universities ===
Unlike new groups (like Deep Group or KAIM) that buy fresh land, old societies (JAT Education Society, DAV, Hindu Education Society, Gaur Brahmin Education Society, SD Society, etc), face stage-2 (Land Audit) issues because even their land was often donated in small parcels over 100 years, making it difficult to prove single contiguity required by the 2006 Act.

- Bhagwan Parshuram University, Kaithal (BPU Kaithal), stage-4 LOI/Compliance/Infra, admissions under own university brand likely from July 2026: Building on the existing Bhagwan Parshuram Institute of Technology (BPIT) infrastructure, the trust has applied to upgrade to a full-fledged private university. They are currently finalizing the endowment fund and separate administrative blocks required for the university charter.

- BRCM University, Bahal (BRCM, Bahal) in Bhiwani district, stage-1 proposal: With 100-acre existing campus with several operational colleges (BRCM College of Engineering & Technology, BRCM Law College, GDC Memorial College for Arts/Sciences/Agriculture, and BRCM College of Pharmacy) and stated goal of becoming a university, it is a prime candidate for the university status.

- Chaudhary Matu Ram Arya University, Rohtak (CMRAU, Rohtak) at Sanghi on Sanghi-Khidwali Road, stage-4 LOI/Compliance/Infra, admissions under own university brand likely from 2027: It has been issued a LOI/Compliance letter and currently developing campus infrastructure and the endowment fund. The university is now required to fulfill the conditions of the Haryana Private Universities Act, 2006, which includes the creation of a permanent endowment fund and the completion of physical infrastructure before the final legislative Bill is tabled. Spearheaded by the "Jat Education Society, Rohtak", which also manages the "Matu Ram Institute of Engineering & Management" (MRIEM) on Delhi Road in Rohtak, it will be a technical university at greenfield site at Matu Ram's ancestral village Sanghi.

- D.A.V. University, Ambala (DAVU, Ambala), combining Ambala and Yamunanagar cluster, stage-3 LOI: With over 900 institutions nationwide and massive campuses in Faridabad and Yamunanagar both of which have high NAAC ratings, they are likely aiming for deemed university status from UGC for this northeast Haryana DAV cluster.

- D.A.V. University Faridabad (DAVU, Faridabad), stage-3 LOI: likely aiming for private university status from Haryana government for the southern Haryana DAV cluster. Many DAV colleges (like Faridabad) are applying for autonomy as the first step to becoming a "Deemed University."

- Dayanand University, Hisar (D.A.V. University, Hisar), stage-1 institutional readiness stage and internal strategic planning: Since it already has UGC NAAC A++ rating, and any institute with this rating can take easier path of obtaining Deemed university status form UGC instead of seeking state act, it already meets all the requirements as it has 20-acre hostel land and 5 acre almost-contiguous college campus land with multi-disciplinary studies with 5700 students and 150+ faculty. UGC recognises it as a "College with Potential for Excellence," it is on the shortlist for the UGC's new "Mentoring towards Autonomy" scheme. Autonomy is the next step towards independent university status. In June 2024, when the college was re-accredited with a NAAC A++ Grade, under the UGC (Institutions Deemed to be Universities) Regulations, 2023, this score allows the DAV Managing Committee to bypass the long state legislative process (Stage 5) and apply directly for Deemed status.

- Deep University in Nuh, stage-2 DPR and land verification: Several private professional colleges in Nuh including Deep Institute Group have submitted intents to form a cluster.

- Hindu University, Sonipat (HU, Sonipat), stage-2 DPR and land consolidation: Founded in 1914, the Hindu Educational Society (Sonipat) runs 14+ institutes (Hindu Degree College, Hindu College of Engineering, Hindu College of Pharmacy, Hindu College of Architecture, Hindu College of Management, etc) meets all the requirements and is in the process of consolidating the contiguous land requirement for consolidating 14+ institutions into the "Hindu University."

- Gaur Brahman University, Rohtak (GBU, Rohtak), stage-2 land audit: the Vidya Pracharini Sabha Rohtak, founded in 1919 and runs several colleges (Gaur Brahman Degree, Education, Ayurvedic, and Sanskrit colleges) is planning to transition its ancient Rohtak campus into a Health & Arts University.

- Sanatan Dharma University (SDU, Ambala/Panipat), stage-2 land audit: Founded in 1916 with several colleges (S.D. College Ambala, S.D. Panipat, Pharmacy and Management colleges), is seeking "Deemed" or "Private" status for its Panipat-Ambala cluster. It owns over 50-acres over various sites and it was verifying it's consolidated land records to meet the 20-acre contiguous requirements. They also have NAAC A++ (CGPA 3.72) rating, the highest in Haryana, they are eligible to apply for Deemed University status via the UGC, which has different land requirements than the state’s private act (5-10 acre), thus making it easier option for them.

- Kedarnath Aggarwal University, Charkhi Dadri (KAU, Charkhi Dadri), stage-2 DPR and land verification: The Kedarnath Aggarwal Institute of Management (KAIM) trust which owns 5-acre land is in the process of ensuring 20-acre rural land ownership for obtaining private university status.

- Lord Shiva University, Sirsa (LSU, Sirsa), stage-4 LOI/Compliance/Infra, admissions under own university brand likely from 2027: The sponsoring body has received the LOI and is in the process of creating the mandatory ₹5 crore endowment fund as of December 2025.

- SGT University, Rewari (SGT, Rewari) at Pali, stage-2 Technical Scrutiny, admissions under own university brand likely from August 2026: Being established by the same body which owns the SGT, Gurugam, this new independent campus will be established as a separate university. As of January 2026, it is in the stage-2 and the proposal for a new campus at Pali with independent university status is currently being evaluated by the government expert committee.

- Shanti Niketan University, Hisar, stage-1 proposal: With 48-acres and cluster of co-located colleges Shanti Niketan College of Engineering (degrees), Shanti Niketan Institute of Engg. & Tech (diplomas), Shanti Niketan Degree College, and Shanti Niketan College of Education, etc it already meets the criteria, though Rs 5 cr endowment might be holding it back.

- Suraj University, Mahendragarh (SU, Mahendragarh), stage-4 LOI/Compliance/Infra, admissions under own university brand likely from August 2026: The Suraj Education Society has proposed the establishment of a private university in Mahendergarh. While currently operating as Suraj Degree College, the move to upgrade to a full private university is part of the state's educational expansion plan. As of January 2026, it is in the Stage-4 Compliance and infrastructure development phase.

=== Residential Satellite campuses ===
- Panjab University (PU) affiliation issue: A significant ongoing dispute involves Panjab University (PU); the Haryana government has intensified its struggle to establish PU's Regional Residential Satellite Centre at either Ambala or Panchkula and restore historical affiliation for colleges in Ambala, Panchkula, and Yamunanagar, even offering to fund 5% of PU’s budget in exchange for a "Regional Centre" or administrative stake, a move firmly contested by Punjab as an infringement on the university's cultural heritage. Inter-State Corporate Body: A unique legal status (like Panjab University) where multiple states claim governance and affiliation rights. There have been persistent efforts by the Haryana government to get colleges in districts like Panchkula and Ambala affiliated with the existing Panjab University, Chandigarh, effectively treating it as a shared state university. This remains a point of political and legal discussion. University main campus lies in Chandigarh, one the issue is resolved some of the constituent colleges will be in Haryana.

== Colleges ==
College	Location	Type	Established	Specialisation	Sources
GC Ambala Cantt.	Ambala	State Govt.	1997	Arts, Science, Commerce	(http://gcambalacantthry.edu.in)
GC Naraingarh	Ambala (Naraingarh)	State Govt.	1981	Arts, Science, Commerce	(http://gcnaraingarh.edu.in)
GC Saha	Ambala (Saha)	State Govt.	2006	Arts, Science, Commerce	(http://gcsaha.ac.in)
GCW Ambala City	Ambala	State Govt.	2012	Arts, Science, Commerce	(http://gcwambalacity.ac.in)
GCW Shahzadpur	Ambala (Shahzadpur)	State Govt.	2018	Arts, Science, Commerce	(http://gcws.ac.in)
GC Bhiwani	Bhiwani	State Govt.	1971	Arts, Science, Commerce	(http://gcbhiwani.ac.in)
GC Education Bhiwani	Bhiwani	State Govt.	1973	B.Ed	(http://gcebhiwani.ac.in/)
GC Issarwal (Isharwal)	Bhiwani (Tosham/Isharwal)	State Govt.	2020	Arts, Science, Commerce	(no website listed)
GC Kural	Bhiwani (Kurdal)	State Govt.	2022	Arts, Science, Commerce	(email entry on portal)
GC Loharu	Bhiwani (Loharu)	State Govt.	1987	Arts, Science, Commerce	(http://cblgcloharu.ac.in)
GC Siwani	Bhiwani (Siwani)	State Govt.	1998	Arts, Science, Commerce	(http://gcsiwani.ac.in)
GCG Kairu (Govt. College for Girls, Kairu)	Bhiwani (Kairu)	State Govt.	2018	Arts, Science, Commerce	(http://gcgkairu.ac.in)
GCW Bawani Khera	Bhiwani (Bawani Khera)	State Govt.	2012	Arts, Science, Commerce	(http://gcwbawanikhera.ac.in)
GCW Behal	Bhiwani (Behal)	State Govt.	2013	Arts, Science, Commerce	(http://gcwbehal.ac.in)
GCW Bhiwani	Bhiwani	State Govt.	2003	Arts, Science, Commerce	(http://gcwbhiwani.ac.in)
GCW Kharak	Bhiwani (Kharak Kalan)	State Govt.	2023	Arts, Science, Commerce	(http://gcwkharak.ac.in)
GCW Loharu	Bhiwani (Loharu)	State Govt.	2018	Arts, Science, Commerce	(http://gcgloharu.ac.in)
GCW Tosham	Bhiwani (Tosham)	State Govt.	2007	Arts, Science, Commerce	(portal entry — no website listed)
GC Chhachhrauli	Yamunanagar (Chhachhrauli)	State Govt.	2019	Arts, Science, Commerce	(http://gcchhachhrauli.ac.in)
GC Cheeka	Kaithal (Cheeka)	State Govt.	2012	Arts, Science, Commerce	(http://gccheeka.ac.in)
GC Charkhi Dadri	Charkhi Dadri	State Govt.	2016	Arts, Science, Commerce	(http://gccharkhidadri.ac.in)
GC Chhatar	Jind (Chhatar)	State Govt.	2018	Arts, Science, Commerce	(http://gcchhatar.ac.in)
GC Chhichhrana	Panipat (Chhichhrana)	State Govt.	2014	Arts, Science, Commerce	(http://gcchhichhrana.ac.in)
GC Chhota Anangpur	Faridabad (Ballabgarh)	State Govt.	2017	Arts, Science, Commerce	(http://gcchhotaanangpur.ac.in)
GC Dadri Toye	Mahendragarh (Dadri Toye)	State Govt.	2020	Arts, Science, Commerce	(http://gcdadritoye.ac.in)
GC Dayalpur	Faridabad (Dayalpur)	State Govt.	2020	Arts, Science, Commerce	(http://gcdayalpur.ac.in)
GC Dujana	Jhajjar (Dujana)	State Govt.	2017	Arts, Science, Commerce	(http://gcdujana.ac.in)
GC Farrukhnagar	Gurugram (Farrukhnagar)	State Govt.	2017	Arts, Science, Commerce	(http://gcfarrukhnagar.ac.in)
GC Ganaur	Sonipat (Ganaur)	State Govt.	2006	Arts, Science, Commerce	(http://gcganaur.ac.in)
GC Gohana	Sonipat (Gohana)	State Govt.	1976	Arts, Science, Commerce	(http://gcgohana.ac.in)
GC Gokalgarh	Rewari (Gokalgarh)	State Govt.	2016	Arts, Science, Commerce	(http://gcgokalgarh.ac.in)
GC Gudha	Mahendragarh (Gudha)	State Govt.	2020	Arts, Science, Commerce	(http://gcgudha.ac.in)
GCW Chhachhrauli	Yamunanagar (Chhachhrauli)	State Govt.	2018	Arts, Science, Commerce	(http://gcwchhachhrauli.ac.in)
GCW Cheeka	Kaithal (Cheeka)	State Govt.	2015	Arts, Science, Commerce	(http://gcwcheeka.ac.in)
GCW Chhapar	Jhajjar (Chhapar)	State Govt.	2013	Arts, Science, Commerce	(http://gcwchhapar.ac.in)
GCW Chhota Anangpur	Faridabad (Ballabgarh)	State Govt.	2017	Arts, Science, Commerce	(http://gcwchhotaanangpur.ac.in)
GCW Dadri	Charkhi Dadri	State Govt.	2008	Arts, Science, Commerce	(http://gcwdadri.ac.in)
GCW Dayalpur	Faridabad (Dayalpur)	State Govt.	2020	Arts, Science, Commerce	(http://gcwdayalpur.ac.in)
GCW Farrukhnagar	Gurugram (Farrukhnagar)	State Govt.	2018	Arts, Science, Commerce	(http://gcwfarrukhnagar.ac.in)
GCW Ganaur	Sonipat (Ganaur)	State Govt.	2013	Arts, Science, Commerce	(http://gcwganaur.ac.in)
GCW Gohana	Sonipat (Gohana)	State Govt.	2012	Arts, Science, Commerce	(http://gcwgohana.ac.in)
GCW Gurawara	Rewari (Gurawara)	State Govt.	2010	Arts, Science, Commerce	(http://gcwgurawara.ac.in)
GCW Gudha	Mahendragarh (Gudha)	State Govt.	2020	Arts, Science, Commerce	(http://gcwgudha.ac.in)
GC Hansi	Hisar (Hansi)	State Govt.	1970	Arts, Science, Commerce	(http://gchansi.ac.in)
GC Hisar	Hisar	State Govt.	1950	Arts, Science, Commerce	(http://gchisar.ac.in)
GC Hodal	Palwal (Hodal)	State Govt.	2017	Arts, Science, Commerce	(http://gchodal.ac.in)
GC Indri	Karnal (Indri)	State Govt.	2007	Arts, Science, Commerce	(http://gcindri.ac.in)
GC Israna	Panipat (Israna)	State Govt.	2014	Arts, Science, Commerce	(http://gcisrana.ac.in)
GC Jagadhri	Yamunanagar (Jagadhri)	State Govt.	1978	Arts, Science, Commerce	(http://gcjagadhri.ac.in)
GC Jind	Jind	State Govt.	1960	Arts, Science, Commerce	(http://gcjind.ac.in)
GC Julana	Jind (Julana)	State Govt.	2011	Arts, Science, Commerce	(http://gcjulana.ac.in)
GC Kalanaur	Rohtak (Kalanaur)	State Govt.	2007	Arts, Science, Commerce	(http://gckalanaur.ac.in)
GC Kalka	Panchkula (Kalka)	State Govt.	1970	Arts, Science, Commerce	(http://gckalka.edu.in)
GC Kaithal	Kaithal	State Govt.	1970	Arts, Science, Commerce	(http://gckaithal.ac.in)
GC Kanwali	Ambala (Kanwali)	State Govt.	2021	Arts, Science, Commerce	(portal entry)
GC Karnal	Karnal	State Govt.	1976	Arts, Science, Commerce	(http://gckarnal.ac.in)
GC Kosli	Rewari (Kosli)	State Govt.	2012	Arts, Science, Commerce	(http://gckosli.ac.in)
GC Kurukshetra	Kurukshetra	State Govt.	1954	Arts, Science, Commerce	(http://gckkr.ac.in)
GC Ladwa	Kurukshetra (Ladwa)	State Govt.	2007	Arts, Science, Commerce	(http://gcladwa.ac.in)
GC Loharu	Bhiwani (Loharu)	State Govt.	1987	Arts, Science, Commerce	(http://cblgcloharu.ac.in)
GC Maham	Rohtak (Meham/Maham)	State Govt.	1982	Arts, Science, Commerce	(http://gcmeham.ac.in)
GC Mahendergarh	Mahendragarh	State Govt.	1957	Arts, Science, Commerce	(http://gcmahendergarh.ac.in)
GC Manesar	Gurugram (Manesar)	State Govt.	2018	Arts, Science, Commerce	(http://gcmanesar.ac.in)
GC Matanhail	Jhajjar (Matanhail)	State Govt.	2011	Arts, Science, Commerce	(http://gcmatanhail.ac.in)
GC Mohindergarh	Mahendragarh (Mohindergarh)	State Govt.	2014	Arts, Science, Commerce	(http://gcmohindergarh.ac.in)
GC Mullana	Ambala (Mullana)	State Govt.	2016	Arts, Science, Commerce	(http://gcmullana.ac.in)
GC Mustafabad	Yamunanagar (Mustafabad)	State Govt.	2013	Arts, Science, Commerce	(http://gcmustafabad.ac.in)
GCW Hisar	Hisar	State Govt.	2003	Arts, Science, Commerce	(http://gcwhisar.ac.in)
GCW Hodal	Palwal (Hodal)	State Govt.	2017	Arts, Science, Commerce	(http://gcwhodal.ac.in)
GCW Indri	Karnal (Indri)	State Govt.	2014	Arts, Science, Commerce	(http://gcwindri.ac.in)
GCW Israna	Panipat (Israna)	State Govt.	2014	Arts, Science, Commerce	(http://gcwisrana.ac.in)
GCW Jagadhri	Yamunanagar (Jagadhri)	State Govt.	2003	Arts, Science, Commerce	(http://gcwjagadhri.ac.in)
GCW Jind	Jind	State Govt.	2005	Arts, Science, Commerce	(http://gcwjind.ac.in)
GCW Kalanaur	Rohtak (Kalanaur)	State Govt.	2012	Arts, Science, Commerce	(http://gcwkalanaur.ac.in)
GCW Kaithal	Kaithal	State Govt.	2007	Arts, Science, Commerce	(http://gcwkaithal.ac.in)
GCW Karnal	Karnal	State Govt.	1973	Arts, Science, Commerce	(http://gcwkarnal.ac.in)
GCW Kosli	Rewari (Kosli)	State Govt.	2014	Arts, Science, Commerce	(http://gcwkosli.ac.in)
GCW Kurukshetra	Kurukshetra	State Govt.	1984	Arts, Science, Commerce	(http://gcwkkr.ac.in)
GCW Ladwa	Kurukshetra (Ladwa)	State Govt.	2011	Arts, Science, Commerce	(http://gcwladwa.ac.in)
GCW Mahendergarh	Mahendragarh	State Govt.	2003	Arts, Science, Commerce	(http://gcwmahendergarh.ac.in)
GCW Meham	Rohtak (Meham)	State Govt.	2008	Arts, Science, Commerce	(http://gcwmeham.ac.in)
GCW Mohindergarh	Mahendragarh	State Govt.	2015	Arts, Science, Commerce	(http://gcwmohindergarh.ac.in)
GCW Mustafabad	Yamunanagar (Mustafabad)	State Govt.	2013	Arts, Science, Commerce	(http://gcwmustafabad.ac.in)
Neki Ram Sharma Government College, Rohtak	Rohtak	State Govt.	1927	Arts, Science, Commerce	(http://nrsgcrohtak.ac.in)
GC Nahar	Rewari (Nahar)	State Govt.	1970	Arts, Science, Commerce	(http://gcnahar.ac.in)
GC Narnaul	Mahendragarh (Narnaul)	State Govt.	1945	Arts, Science, Commerce	(http://gcnarnaul.ac.in)
GC Nuh	Nuh (Mewat)	State Govt.	1957	Arts, Science, Commerce	(http://gcnuh.ac.in)
GC Panchkula	Panchkula	State Govt.	1983	Arts, Science, Commerce	(http://gcpanchkula.ac.in)
GC Panipat	Panipat	State Govt.	1969	Arts, Science, Commerce	(http://gcpanipat.ac.in)
GC Pataudi	Gurugram (Pataudi)	State Govt.	1979	Arts, Science, Commerce	(http://gcpataudi.ac.in)
GC Pehowa	Kurukshetra (Pehowa)	State Govt.	1970	Arts, Science, Commerce	(http://gcpehowa.ac.in)
GC Pinangwan	Nuh (Pinangwan)	State Govt.	2016	Arts, Science, Commerce	(http://gcpinangwan.ac.in)
GC Radaur	Yamunanagar (Radaur)	State Govt.	1970	Arts, Science, Commerce	(http://gcradaur.ac.in)
GC Rania	Sirsa (Rania)	State Govt.	2017	Arts, Science, Commerce	(http://gcrania.ac.in)
GC Rewari	Rewari	State Govt.	2017	Arts, Science, Commerce	(http://gcrewari.ac.in)
GC Rohtak	Rohtak	State Govt.	1927	Arts, Science, Commerce	(http://gcrohtak.ac.in)
GCW Nuh	Nuh	State Govt.	2014	Arts, Science, Commerce	(http://gcwnuh.ac.in)
GCW Palwal	Palwal	State Govt.	2013	Arts, Science, Commerce	(http://gcwpalwal.ac.in)
GCW Panchkula	Panchkula	State Govt.	2003	Arts, Science, Commerce	(http://gcwpanchkula.ac.in)
GCW Panipat	Panipat	State Govt.	1992	Arts, Science, Commerce	(http://gcwpanipat.ac.in)
GCW Pataudi	Gurugram (Pataudi)	State Govt.	2007	Arts, Science, Commerce	(http://gcwpataudi.ac.in)
GCW Pehowa	Kurukshetra (Pehowa)	State Govt.	2005	Arts, Science, Commerce	(http://gcwpehowa.ac.in)
GCW Pinangwan	Nuh (Pinangwan)	State Govt.	2016	Arts, Science, Commerce	(http://gcwpinangwan.ac.in)
GCW Radaur	Yamunanagar (Radaur)	State Govt.	2007	Arts, Science, Commerce	(http://gcwradaur.ac.in)
GCW Rania	Sirsa (Rania)	State Govt.	2017	Arts, Science, Commerce	(http://gcwrania.ac.in)
GCW Rewari	Rewari	State Govt.	2008	Arts, Science, Commerce	(http://gcwrewari.ac.in)
GCW Rohtak (Govt. PG College for Women)	Rohtak	State Govt.	1959	Arts, Science, Commerce	(http://gpgcw.ac.in)
GC Safidon	Jind (Safidon)	State Govt.	1976	Arts, Science, Commerce	(http://gcsafidon.ac.in)
GC Sampla	Rohtak (Sampla)	State Govt.	1973	Arts, Science, Commerce	(http://gcsampla.ac.in)
GC Shahbad Markanda	Kurukshetra (Shahbad)	State Govt.	1970	Arts, Science, Commerce	(http://gcshahbad.ac.in)
GC Sirsa	Sirsa	State Govt.	1956	Arts, Science, Commerce	(http://gcsirsa.ac.in)
GC Sohna	Gurugram (Sohna)	State Govt.	1973	Arts, Science, Commerce	(http://gcsohna.ac.in)
GC Sonipat	Sonipat	State Govt.	1959	Arts, Science, Commerce	(http://gcsonipat.ac.in)
GC Taoru	Nuh (Taoru)	State Govt.	2015	Arts, Science, Commerce	(http://gctaoru.ac.in)
GC Thanesar	Kurukshetra (Thanesar)	State Govt.	1954	Arts, Science, Commerce	(http://gcthanesar.ac.in)
GC Tigaon	Faridabad (Tigaon)	State Govt.	2014	Arts, Science, Commerce	(http://gctigaon.ac.in)
GC Tosham	Bhiwani (Tosham)	State Govt.	1970	Arts, Science, Commerce	(http://gctosham.ac.in)
GC Uchana	Jind (Uchana)	State Govt.	1971	Arts, Science, Commerce	(http://gcuchana.ac.in)
GC Yamunanagar	Yamunanagar	State Govt.	1967	Arts, Science, Commerce	(http://gcyamunanagar.ac.in)
GCW Safidon	Jind (Safidon)	State Govt.	2008	Arts, Science, Commerce	(http://gcwsafidon.ac.in)
GCW Sampla	Rohtak (Sampla)	State Govt.	2009	Arts, Science, Commerce	(http://gcwsampla.ac.in)
GCW Shahbad Markanda	Kurukshetra (Shahbad)	State Govt.	2005	Arts, Science, Commerce	(http://gcwshahbad.ac.in)
GCW Sirsa	Sirsa	State Govt.	1991	Arts, Science, Commerce	(http://gcwsirsa.ac.in)
GCW Sohna	Gurugram (Sohna)	State Govt.	2007	Arts, Science, Commerce	(http://gcwsohna.ac.in)
GCW Sonipat	Sonipat	State Govt.	1998	Arts, Science, Commerce	(http://gcwsonipat.ac.in)
GCW Taoru	Nuh (Taoru)	State Govt.	2015	Arts, Science, Commerce	(http://gcwtaoru.ac.in)
GCW Thanesar	Kurukshetra (Thanesar)	State Govt.	1972	Arts, Science, Commerce	(http://gcwthanesar.ac.in)
GCW Tosham	Bhiwani (Tosham)	State Govt.	2009	Arts, Science, Commerce	(http://gcwtosham.ac.in)
GCW Uchana	Jind (Uchana)	State Govt.	2006	Arts, Science, Commerce	(http://gcwuchana.ac.in)
GCW Yamunanagar	Yamunanagar	State Govt.	1990	Arts, Science, Commerce	(http://gcwyamunanagar.ac.in)

=== Government/State Ayurvedic AYUSH Colleges ===
==== State Govt. funded Ayurvedic AYUSH Colleges ====
College	Location	Type	Established	Specialisation	Sources
Shri Krishna Government Ayurvedic College & Hospital, Kurukshetra	Kurukshetra	Govt.	1972	B.A.M.S., Ayurvedic Pharmacy Diploma B.A.M.S.; also Diploma in Ayurvedic Pharmacy.	
Shri Maru Singh Memorial Mahila Ayurvedic College Sonipat	Sonipat	Govt.	1973	(Women’s College)	
Baba Khetanath Government Ayurvedic College & Hospital, Narnaul, Mahendragarh	Mahendragarh	Govt.	2011	(Patikara) B.A.M.S. About 100 seats.	

=== Engineering Colleges/Institutes ===
==== State Govt. funded Technical Universities/ State Institute of Engineering & Technology ====
College	Location	Type	Established	Specialisation	Sources
Chaudhary Devi Lal Memorial Government Engineering College	Sirsa, Haryana	State Govt.	2003		
State Institute of Engineering & Technology, Nilokheri	Nilokheri, Karnal, Haryana	State Govt.	2015	Engineering education, Engineering management, Technical Education Centre	
State Institute of Engineering & Technology, Rewari	Rewari, Haryana	State Govt.	2017		
Ch. Ranbir Singh State Institute of Engineering & Technology, Jhajjar	Rewari, Haryana	State Govt.	2017		
Guru Jambheshwar University of Science and Technology	Hisar	State Govt.	1995		
J.C. Bose University of Science and Technology, YMCA	Faridabad, Haryana	State Govt.	1969		
Chaudhary Charan Singh Haryana Agricultural University	Hisar	State Govt.	1995		
University Institute of Engg. & Technology, MDU Rohtak	Rohtak	State Govt.	1995		
Deenbandhu Chhotu Ram University of Science and Technology	Murthal	State Govt.	1986		
School of Engineering & Sciences, BPS Mahila Vishwavidyalaya, Khanpur Kalan	Murthal	State Govt.	1986		
Department of Instrumentation, Kurukshetra University, Kurukshetra	Kurukshetra	State Govt.	1956		
University Institute of Engineering and Technology, Kurukshetra University	Kurukshetra	State Govt.	2004		
Chaudhary Devi Lal University	Sirsa	State Govt.	2003		
Gurugram University	Gurugram	State Govt.	2017		
Indira Gandhi University, Rewari	Rewari	State Govt.	2013		
Shri Vishwakarma Skill University	Gurugram	State Govt.	2016		

==== Private Engineering Colleges/Institutes ====
College	Location	Type	Established	Specialisation	Sources
Delhi Institute of Technology & Management	Sonipat	Private	2007	Engineering education, Engineering management, Technical Education Centre	
Technological Institute of Textile & Sciences	Bhiwani	Private	1943		
World College of Technology & Management (WCTM Gurgaon), Farrukhnagar, Gurugram	Gurugram	Private	2007	Engineering, Management	

=== Education & Research Colleges/Institutes ===
==== Other research institutes ====
- Institute of Pesticide Formulation Technology (IPFT), Gurugram.
- Regional Centre for Biotechnology (RCB), Faridabad.
- Translational Health Science and Technology Institute (THSTI), Faridabad.

==== Government Education & Research Colleges/Institutes ====
College	Location	Type	Established	Specialisation	Sources
District Institute of Education & Training, Palwal, Kurukshetra	Kurukshetra	Government/Autonomous	2022	Education	
District Institute of Education & Training, Mohra, Ambala	Ambala	Government/Autonomous	2022	Education	
State Institute of Advanced Studies in Teacher Education, Kurukshetra	Kurukshetra	Government/Autonomous	2022	Education	
State Institute of Advanced Studies in Teacher Education, Jhajjar	Jhajjar	Government/Autonomous	2013	Education	
State Institute of Advanced Studies in Teacher Education, Gurugram	Gurugram	Government/Autonomous	2022	Education	

== Polytechnics ==
=== Govt. Polytechnic Institutes ===
All the Government Polytechnic Institutes in Haryana are under the Government of Haryana. There are several **Government Polytechnic Institutes** across the state. These institutions provide diploma-level technical education and are affiliated with the Haryana State Board of Technical Education (HSBTE), Panchkula, and approved by the All India Council for Technical Education (AICTE), New Delhi.

College	Location	Type	Established	Specialisation	Sources
BKN Govt. Polytechnic, Narnaul	Mahendergarh	Government	2016	Diploma Engineering	[1]
BPS Mahila Polytechnic, Khanpur Kalan	Sonipat	Government	2006	Women’s Polytechnic	[2]
Ch. Bansi Lal Govt. Polytechnic	Bhiwani	Government	2013	Engineering & Technology	[3]
Ch. Devi Lal Govt. Polytechnic, Nathusari Chopta	Sirsa	Government	2003	Civil, Electrical, Mechanical	[4]
Ch. Matu Ram Arya Govt. Polytechnic, Sanghi	Rohtak	Government	2016	Diploma Engineering	[5]
Chhotu Ram Polytechnic	Rohtak	Government	1951	Engineering & Technology	[6]
Deen Bandhu Sir Chhotu Ram Govt. Polytechnic, Sampla	Rohtak	Government	2016	Engineering Diploma	[7]
Govt. Polytechnic, Ambala City	Ambala	Government	1929	Civil, Mechanical, Electrical	[8]
Govt. Polytechnic, Chappar	Charkhi Dadri	Government	2017	Diploma Engineering	[9]
Govt. Polytechnic, Chika	Kaithal	Government	2010	Diploma Engineering	[10]
Govt. Polytechnic, Dhamlawas	Rewari	Government	2016	Engineering Diploma	[11]
Govt. Polytechnic, Dhangar	Fatehabad	Government	2017	Diploma Engineering	[12]
Govt. Polytechnic, Hathnikund	Yamunanagar	Government	2018	Civil, Mechanical	[13]
Govt. Polytechnic, Hisar	Hisar	Government	1992	Engineering & Technology	[14]
Govt. Polytechnic, Indri	Nuh (Mewat)	Government	2015	Civil, Mechanical	[15]
Govt. Polytechnic, Jamalpur Shaikhon	Rohtak	Government	2017	Diploma Engineering	[16]
Govt. Polytechnic, Jhajjar	Jhajjar	Government	1962	Civil, Mechanical	[17]
Govt. Polytechnic, Lisana	Rewari	Government	2006	Civil, Computer, Electrical	[18]
Govt. Polytechnic, Malab	Nuh (Mewat)	Government	2013	Civil, Mechanical	[19]
Govt. Polytechnic, Mandkola	Palwal	Government	2010	Engineering Diploma	[20]
Govt. Polytechnic, Manesar	Gurugram	Government	2010	Engineering Diploma	[21]
Govt. Polytechnic, Mandi Adampur	Hisar	Government	2008	Diploma Engineering	[22]
Govt. Polytechnic, Meham	Rohtak	Government	2009	Diploma Engineering	[23]
Govt. Polytechnic, Morni	Panchkula	Government	2010	Engineering Diploma	[24]
Govt. Polytechnic, Nanakpur	Panchkula	Government	2010	Engineering Diploma	[25]
Govt. Polytechnic, Rajpur Sadhaura	Yamunanagar	Government	2010	Civil, Electrical	[26]
Govt. Polytechnic, Sector 26	Panchkula	Government	2019	Engineering Diploma	[27]
Govt. Polytechnic, Shergarh	Kaithal	Government	2016	Diploma Engineering	[28]
Govt. Polytechnic, Sirsa	Sirsa	Government	1962	Civil, Mechanical, Electrical	[29]
Govt. Polytechnic, Sonipat	Sonipat	Government	2010	Diploma Engineering	[30]
Govt. Polytechnic, Umri	Kurukshetra	Government	2016	Diploma Engineering	[31]
Govt. Polytechnic, Uttawar	Nuh (Mewat)	Government	2013	Civil, Electrical	[32]
Govt. Polytechnic for Women, Faridabad	Faridabad	Government	1999	Women’s Polytechnic	[33]
Govt. Polytechnic for Women, Sirsa	Sirsa	Government	1985	Women’s Polytechnic	[34]
Guru Brahma Nand Ji Govt. Polytechnic, Nilokheri	Karnal	Government	1947	Civil, Mechanical, Electrical	[35]
Kalpana Chawla Govt. Polytechnic for Women	Ambala	Government	1995	Women’s Polytechnic	[36]
Maharishi Kashyap Govt. Polytechnic, Jattal	Panipat	Government	2010	Engineering Diploma	[37]
Raja Jait Singh Govt. Polytechnic, Neemka	Faridabad	Government	2017	Engineering Diploma	[38]
Rajiv Gandhi Govt. Polytechnic, Narwana	Jind	Government	2010	Civil, Mechanical	[39]
Rani Jhansi Laxmi Bai Govt. Polytechnic, Loharu	Bhiwani	Government	2001	Engineering Diploma	[40]
Seth Jai Parkash Polytechnic, Damla	Yamunanagar	Government	1981	Computer, Electronics, Electrical, Chemical, Civil, Mechanical	[41]
Vaish Technical Institute	Rohtak	Government-aided	1957	Civil, Mechanical, Electrical	[42]

== See also ==
- Haryana
  - Education
    - Haryana Board of School Education
    - Rajiv Gandhi Education City, Sonipat
    - Medical colleges in Haryana
    - Haryana Overseas Placement Assistance Society (HOPAS), registered government agency to help youth of state with overseas placements in higher studies (also see "Department of Foreign Cooperation" of Haryana Government)
  - Job placement
    - Haryana Kaushal Rozgar Nigam Limited (HKRNL), state government company as an authorized Recruiting Agent (RA) registered under the Ministry of External Affairs (MEA) for overseas job placement
- Education in India
  - List of universities in India
  - List of medical colleges in India
- Global
  - Education Index
  - List of agricultural universities and colleges
  - List of schools of veterinary medicine
