= List of law schools in Haryana =

List of law schools in Haryana, India

In Haryana the courses of Law are offered by various private and government colleges and universities around fifty Legal Education Centres. These courses are being taught in various universities and colleges in India. One can pursue his or her study in various law courses such as LL.B, integrated LL.B, LL.M and doctoral courses. LLB is an undergraduate degree that covers core specializations and mainly focuses on Criminal Law, Contract Law, Constitutional/Administrative Law, Equity and Trusts, land Law, Tort Law. The alphabetical list of CLE's are as under:-

Sr. No.	District	Established	Name of Legal Education Centre	Programs	Status/ Academic Head
1	(i) Ambala	2008	Lala Ami Chand Monga Memorial College of Law, Ugala, Ambala	3-year course, 5 year BA.LLB, LL.M	College
2	(ii) Ambala	2008	Maharishi Markandeshwar University, Sadopur ( M.M.), Mullana-Ambala, Centre for Post Graduate Legal Studies	3 year & 5 year BA.LLB, BBA.LLB(H), BCom.LLB(H)	University
3	(i) Bhiwani	2016	BITS Law College, Bhiwani, Haryana	3 year LL.B, 5 year BA LL.B	College
4	(ii) Bhiwani	2016	BRCM Law College affiliated Chaudhary Bansi Lal University		College
NIL	Charkhi Dadri	No CLE			
5	(i) Faridabad	2007	B. S. Anangpuria Institute of Law, Faridabad 5 year BA LL.B(H) (three year closed beyond 2016–17)		College
6	(ii) Faridabad	1998	Institute of Law and Research, Faridabad	3 year & 5 year BA.LLB, BBA. LL.B	College
7	(iii) Faridabad	2017	Lingaya's Deemed University, School of Law, Faridabad	3 year LL.B, 5 year BBA.LLB(H)	National Law University
8	(iv) Faridabad	2014	Manav Rachna University, Faculty of Law, Faridabad	5 year BA.LLB(H), BBA.LLB(H), BCom.LLB(H)	University
NIL	Fatehabad	No CLE			
9	(i) Gurugram	2012	Amity University, Gurgaon, Amity Law School	5 year BA.LLB(H), BBA.LLB(H), BCom.LLB(H)	University
10	(ii) Gurugram	2014	Ansal University, Gurgaon, School Of Law	5 year BA.LLB(H), 5 year BBA LL.B(H)	University
11	(iii) Gurugram	2015	Apeejay Stya University, Gurgaon, School of Law	5 year BA.LLB(H), BBA.LLB(H), 3 year LL.B.	
12	(iv) Gurugram	2014	BML Munjal University		University
13	(v) Gurugram	2014	GD Goenka University School Of Law, Gurgaon	3 year LLB, 5 year BA.LLB(H), BBA.LLB(H), BCom.LLB(H)	University
14	(vi) Gurugram	2018	IILM University		University
15	(vii) Gurugram	2013	KR Mangalam University, School of Law, Gurgaon	5 year B.Com. LL.B(H), BBA.LLB(H), BA.LLB(H), 3 year LLB(H)	University
16	(viii) Gurugram	2000	MDU Center for Professional and Allied Studies, Gurugram Previously known as Institute of Law and Management Studies		College
17	(ix) Gurugram	2014	SGT Shree Guru Gobind Singh Tricentenary University, Department of law, Gurgaon	5 year BA.LLB(H), BBA.LLB(H), 3 year LLB(H)	University
18	(x) Gurugram	2016	Starex University		University
19	(xi) Gurugram	2010	The NorthCap University Law School, Gurgaon	5 year BBA. LLB (Hons.)	University
20	(i) Hisar	2003	Chhaju Ram Law College, Hisar	3-year course, 5-year course	College
NIL	Hisar	1995-96	Guru Jambheshwar University of Science and Technology, Department of Law, Hisar	3-year course	University
21	(ii) Hisar	2019	Om Sterling Global University		University
22	(i) Jhajjar	2014	Jagan Nath University, NCR Bahadurgarh, Faculty of Legal Education, Jhajjar	5 year BA.LLB(H)	University
23	(ii) Jhajjar	2016	MERI College of Professional and Law Institute, Sampla	5 year BA LL.B	College
24	(iii) Jhajjar	2017	PDM University, Faculty of Law, Bahadurgarh, Dist. Jhajjar	3 year LL.B, 5 year BA.LLB, BCom.LLB	University
NIL	Jind	2005	Chaudhary Ranbir Singh University, Department of Law	3 year and 5-year course	Proposed in University
25	Kaithal	2013	NIILM University, School of Law, Kaithal	3-year course, 5 year BA.LLB	University
26	Karnal	2013	Vidyavati Institute of Law, Karnal	3 year LL.B, 5 year BA LL.B	College
27	(i) Kurukshetra	2016	Bharat College of Law, Kurukshetra	3 year LL.B, 5 year BA LL.B	College
28	(ii) Kurukshetra	1969	Kurukshetra University, Deptt. of Law, Institute of Law, Kurukshetra	3-year course, 5 year BA.LLB	University
29	Mahendragarh	2020	Central University of Haryana	3 yr LLB, 2 yr LLM	Central University
NIL	Nuh	No CLE			
30	(i) Palwal	2015	MVN University, School of Law, Palwal	3 year LLB, 5 year BBA.LLB, BA.LLB	University
31	(ii) Palwal	2017	Saraswati Institute of Law, Palwal	3 year LL.B, 5 year BALL.B	College
32	Panchkula	2007	Swami Devi Dayal Law College, Panchkula	3 year LLB, 5 year BA.LLB course	College
33	Panipat	2007	Geeta Institute of Law, Panipat	3 year LL.B, 5 year BA LL.B, BBA LL.B(H)	College
34	(i) Rewari	2014	Indira Gandhi University, Rewari, Department of Law, Meerpur, Rewari	3 year LLB course	University
35	(ii) Rewari	2008	Smt. Shanti Devi Law College, Rewari, affiliated with Indira Gandhi University, Meerpur, Rewari		College
36	(i) Rohtak	2014	Baba Mast Nath University, in Asthal Bohar, Rohtak Department of Law	3 year LLB, 5 year BA.LLB	University
37	(ii) Rohtak	1978	Faculty of Law, Maharshi Dayanand University, Rohtak	3 year & 5-year course	University
38	(iii) Rohtak	2009	Chhotu Ram Institute of Law, Rohtak, MDU Affiliated College	3 year LLB, 5 year BA.LLB	
39	(iv) Rohtak	2012	Shamsher Bahadur Saxena College of Law, Rohtak	3-year course, 5 year BA.LLB	College
40	(v) Rohtak	2010	Vaish College of Law, Rohtak	3-year course	College
41	(i) Sirsa	2005	Chaudhary Devi Lal University		University
42	(ii) Sirsa	2006	Lala Habs Raj Phutela College affiliated to Chaudhary Devi Lal University		University
43	(i) Sonipat	2003	B.P.S. Mahila Vishwavidyalaya, Department of Law, Kanpurkalan (old name P.S.D. Girls Law College)	5 year B.A. LL.B., BBA., LL.B.	University
44	(ii) Sonipat	2009	Jindal Global Law School, O. P. Jindal Global University, Sonipat, Haryana	3 year LLB course, 5 year BA.LLB course, BA.LLB(H)	Autonomous University
45	(iii) Sonipat	2015	South Point College of Law, Sonipat	3-year course, 5 year BA.LLB	College
46	(iv) Sonipat	2014	SRM University, Haryana, Faculty of Law, Sonepat	3 year LLB(H), 5 year BA.LLB(H), BBA.LLB(H), B.Com. LL.B(H)	University
47	(v) Sonipat	2018	Dr. B.R. Ambedkar National Law University		National Law University
NIL	Yamunanagar	No CLE			

== See also ==
- Autonomous law schools in India
- Common Law Admission Test
- Legal education in India
