= Ram Sajan Pandey =

Hindi academic (1957–2021)

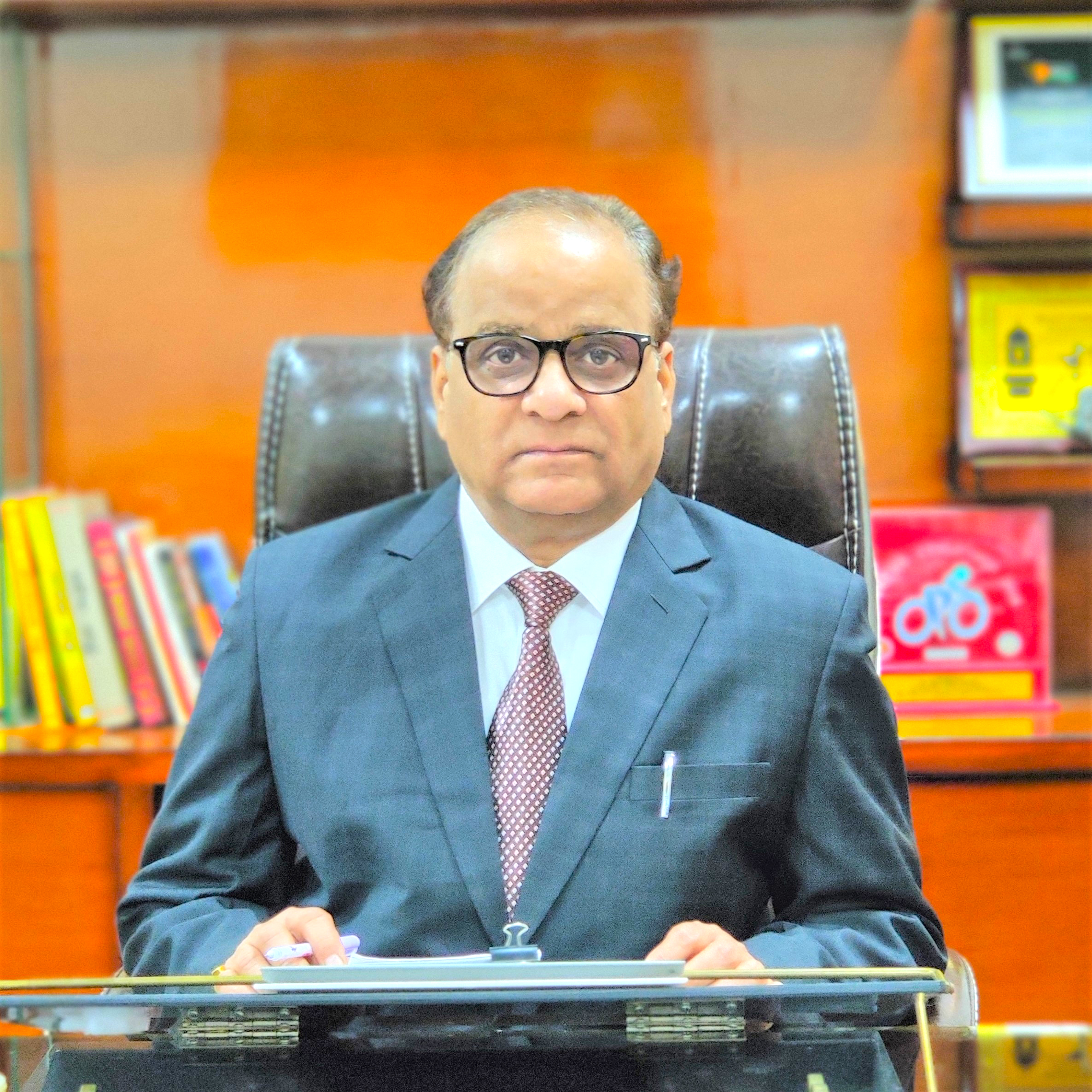
- In office 2018–2021

Personal details
- Born: Ram Sajan Pandey; 1 January 1957 Uttar Pradesh, India
- Died: 7 May 2021 (aged 64) Rohtak, India
- Children: Dr. Parijat Pandey
- Education: Dr. Ram Manohar Lohia Avadh University
- Occupation: Vice-chancellor
- Profession: Administrator, Teacher, Speaker & Author
- Website: www.bmu.ac.in/vice-chancellor

Ram Sajan Pandey (1 January 1957 – 7 May 2021) was the vice chancellor of Baba Mast Nath University (BMU), Rohtak, Haryana.

== Biography ==
He had joined BMU in 2018. Previously he had worked as Hindi professor in Maharshi Dayanand University and Indira Gandhi University, Rewari for 33 years. He died due to COVID-19 complications in Rohtak on 7 May 2021, at 11:00 am.

== Books ==
He authored 33 books, including:

- Pandey, Ramsajan (2016). Hindi Sahitya Ka Itihas. Sanjay Prakashan. ISBN 978-8174531537.
- Pandey, Ramsajan (2005). Kavita Ka Paripaath. GEETA PRAKASHAN. ISBN 978-8174531841.
- Pandey, Ramsajan (2016). Mahendra Bhatnagar Ki Kavya Yatra. Sanjay Prakashan. ISBN 978-8174531070.
- Pandey, Ramsajan (2006). Nirgun Kavya Ki Sanskritik Bhumika.
- Pandey, Ramsajan (2015). Ramkavya Parampara Aur Prativad Parva. Utsava Prakāśana. ISBN 978-8192512570.
- Pandey, Ramsajan (2016). Saundarya Swarup Aur Vidyapati. Utsava Prakāśana. ISBN 978-8192512594.
- Pandey, Ramsajan (2017). Vidyapati Vaibhav. Śabda Setu. ISBN 978-8188598397.
- Pandey, Ramsajan (2007). Vidyapati Vyaktitav Aur Kavitav. Jīvana Jyoti Prakāśana. ISBN 978-8188384273.
- Pandey, Ramsajan (2007). Vividh Sahityik Vaad. ISBN 978-8192512624.
- Pandey, Ramsajan (2005). Sanskriti Aur Saundarya. Sanjay Prakashan. ISBN 978-8174531834.
