= List of educational institutes in Rohtak =

This is a list of colleges and universities in Rohtak, Haryana, India:

- All India Jat Heroes' Memorial College
- Indian Institute of Management Rohtak (IIM Rohtak)
- Haryana Technical Institute Near New Bus Stand, Rohtak
- Maa Saraswati Institute of Engineering & Technology, Kalanaur, Rohtak
- Maharishi Dayanand University
- Neki Ram Sharma Government College
- State Institute of Film and Television
- Jat Education Society Rohtak
- Government College for Women (IC College)
