= List of design education institutions in India =

Design education institutions in India include university departments and schools, several within the Indian Institutes of Technology, as well as design institutes.

== List ==
- Department of Design, IIT Delhi
- IDC School of Design, IIT Bombay
- Department of Design, IIT Hyderabad
- Department of Design, DA-IICT Gandhinagar
- MIT ID Indore - Avantika University
- National Institute of Design
- IIFD Indian Institute of Fashion and Design
- Industrial Design Center
- National Institute of Fashion Technology
- MAEER's MIT Institute of Design, Pune
- Kerala State Institute of Design, Kollam
- IILM University Gurugram
- SAGE School of Architecture Planning and Design, SAGE University Bhopal
- Geodetic Institute of Design and Development, Varanasi
