= IILM University =

- IILM University Gurugram
- IILM University Greater Noida
