= D. Suresh =

Indian civil servant

IAS

Personal details
- Born: August 12, 1966 (age 60)
- Occupation: Civil servant

D. Suresh (born 12 August 1966) is an Indian civil servant of the Indian Administrative Service (IAS), belonging to the 1995 batch of the Haryana cadre.

Prior to joining the civil service, Suresh played first-class cricket for the Hyderabad cricket team.

== Career ==
Suresh joined the Indian Administrative Service through direct recruitment and was allotted to the Haryana cadre in 1995.

He has served in various positions in the Government of Haryana. In 2020, he was promoted to the Higher Administrative Grade at the level of Principal Secretary.

As of 2026, he was serving as Principal Resident Commissioner at Haryana Bhawan, New Delhi, while also holding responsibilities at the level of Principal Secretary in the Government of Haryana.

Suresh has held appointments in several departments of the Government of Haryana, including Industries and Commerce, Higher Education, Food, Civil Supplies and Consumer Affairs, Art and Cultural Affairs, Housing for All, and Fisheries.

He served as Vice-Chancellor of Indira Gandhi University, Meerpur.

== Cricket ==
Before entering the civil service, Suresh played first-class cricket for Hyderabad. According to ESPN Cricinfo records, he appeared in six first-class matches between the 1986–87 and 1988–89 seasons.
