= Chhot =

Fishing boat found in Bengal

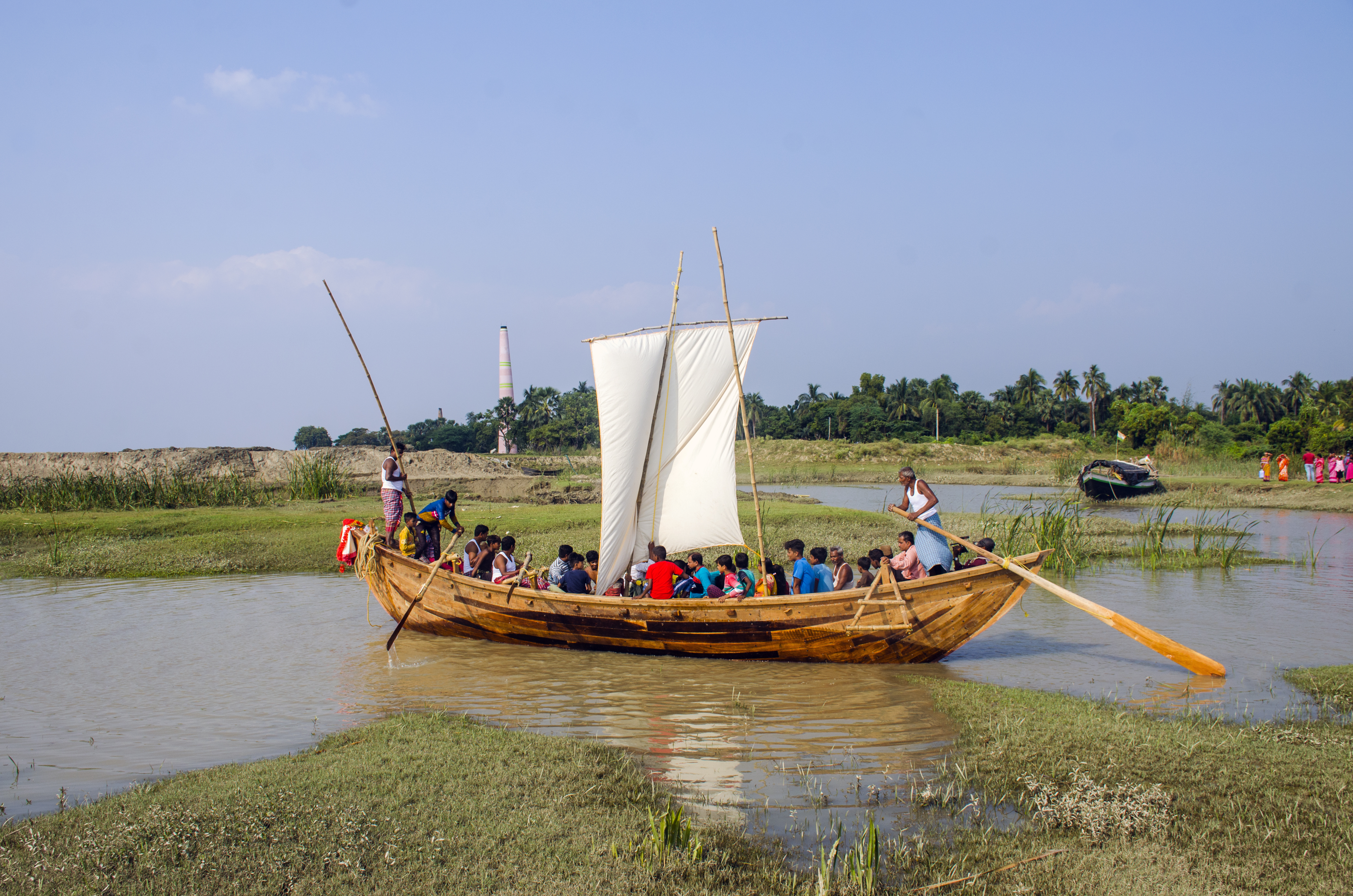
A Chhot boat with sails

Chhot is a fishing boat, found in coastal water and coastal rivers of Bengal. This boats was widely used by fishermen in the lower reaches of the Rupnarayan and Hooghly rivers. The boat is capable of sailing in coastal waters.

Chhot boats were used for fishing as well as for transporting goods. However, the use of these boats is on the verge of extinction.

In 2022, Chhot boat building methods and techniques were documented. This documentation was completed by the Endangered Materials Knowledge Program (EMKP) funded by the British Museum.

== History ==
No information is available on the history of the Chhot boat. The Jhumjhumi was famous for building these boats. These boats were used for fishing as well as carrying cargo until the mid-20th century, but are now used exclusively for fishing. Boats were loaded with rice from rice mills around Kolaghat and delivered to the destination. These boats also used to tow Khorokisti carrying straw from remote areas of the Sundarbans to Kolkata.

=== Reconstruction and documentation ===
The specialty of this boat called "Chhot" is that the wooden hulls are joined with metal in such a way that the shape of the boat is like a 'V'. Helps to cut river water easily. So the entire process is being documented.

—Prof. John P. Cooper

A reconstruction project was undertaken under a collaborative project between the University of Exeter in the United Kingdom and the Central University of Haryana in India to document Chhot boat construction knowledge. The reconstruction and documentation project is known as The chhot-builders of West Bengal, India: Documenting the vanishing craft knowledge of a unique boat-building tradition. A documentary on the making of "Chhot" boats was produced jointly by India and the United Kingdom, with Endangered Materials Knowledge Program by the financial support of the British Museum.

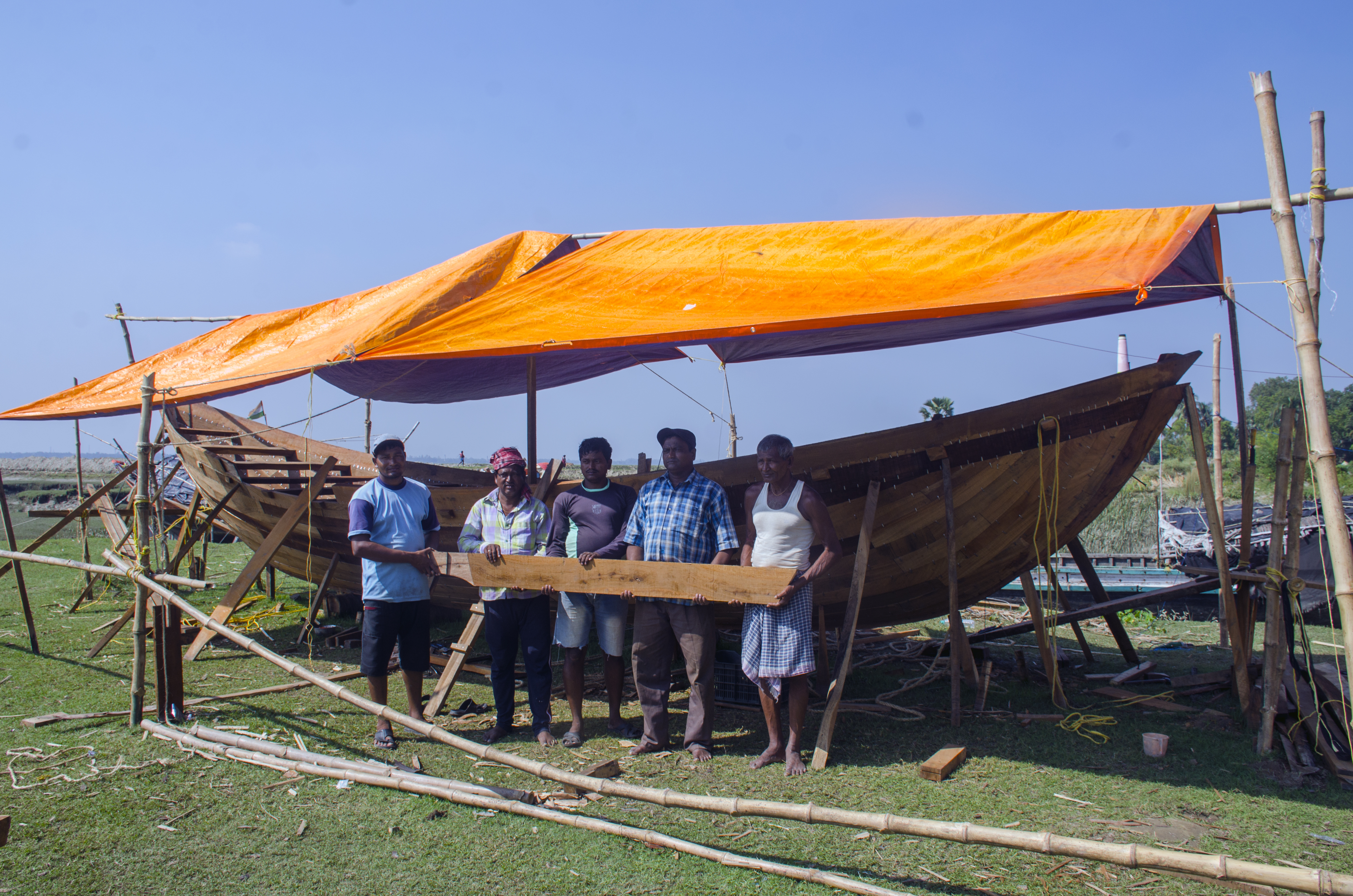
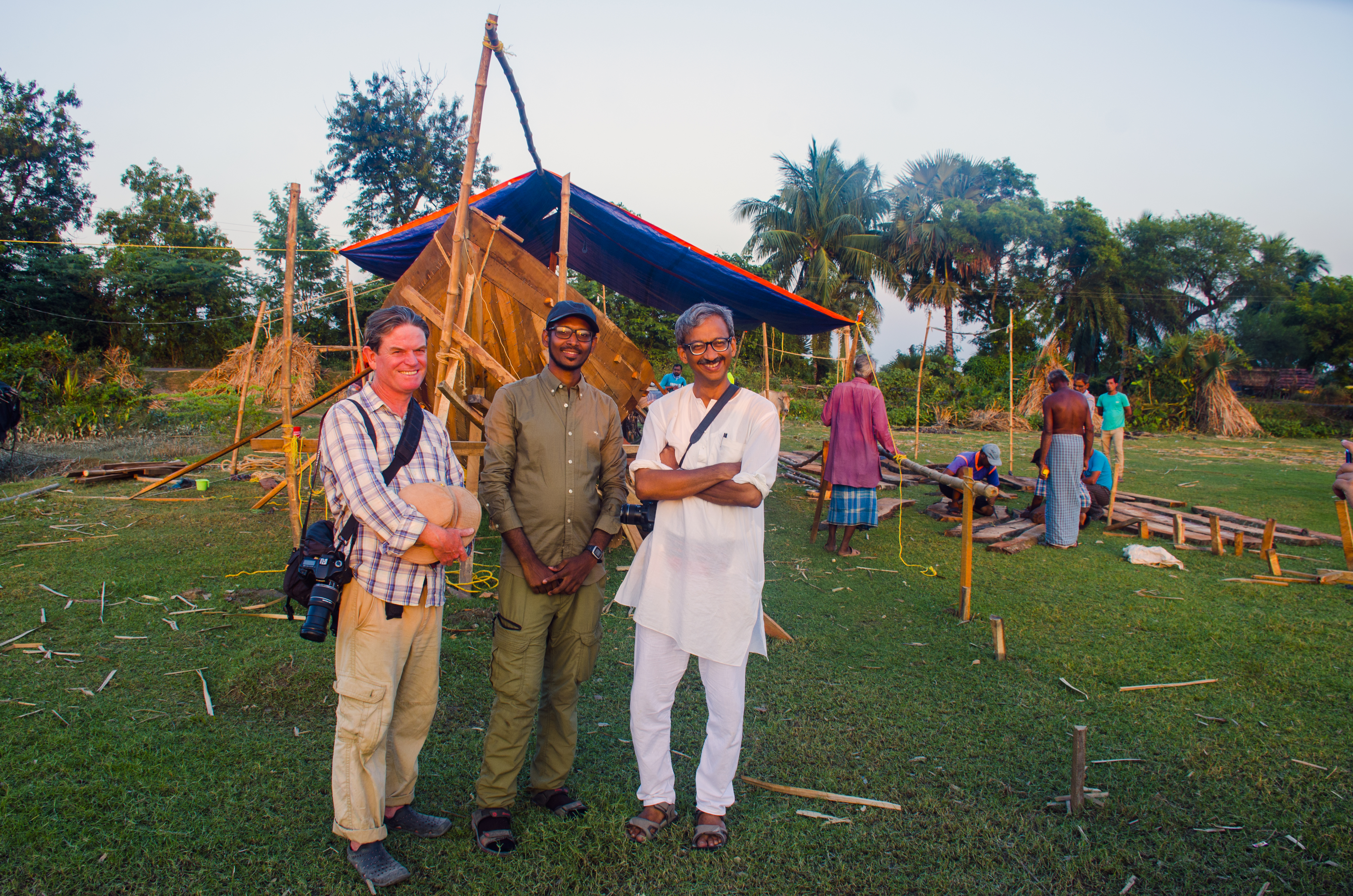
Left: The chief craftsman of the Chhot boat is (left to right) Panchanan Mondal and his associates are Dilip Mondal, Amal Mondal, Deepak Mondal and Manimohan Mondal, Right: Project Supervisors — (left to right) John P. Cooper, Zeeshan Ali Shaikh and Swarup Bhattacharya.

The construction work of Chhot was completed at Dihimandal Ghat at Shyampur, Howrah district, West Bengal. Panchanan Mandal was the main craftsman of this boat; Panchanan Mandal and his 4 sons built this almost defunct boat. The boat was built in about 40 days. All construction activities and procedures from start to finish of boat building are captured by videography, which has been preserved in a museum in England. On 10 November 2022, the boat made its first voyage. A total of Rs 350,000 was spent on the construction of the boat.

== Architecture ==
The design of a Chhot boat enables the boat to sail in coastal rivers and coastal waters. The hull of this boat is deep and pointed. The hull of the wooden boat is V-shaped, which allows the boat to remain stable in the water even when buffeted by waves or wind. Due to its basically "V" shape, the boat is suitable for coastal waters.
