= Chisholm Institute =

Vocational education college in Melbourne, Australia

Coordinates: 37°58′30.68″S 145°13′11.06″E

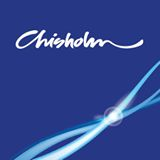
- Type: TAFE Institute
- Established: 1998
- Chair: Gillian Miles
- Location: Various cities, Victoria, Australia
- Website: www.chisholm.edu.au

Chisholm Institute is a government-owned Technical and Further Education (TAFE) Institute located in south-east Melbourne Australia. It provides adult education in several areas including the arts, hospitality, information technology, trades and business. Chisholm offers over 250 certificate, diploma, advanced diploma, bachelor and graduate certificate courses.

The Institute takes its name from Caroline Chisholm. Its name was also inspired by the Chisholm Institute of Technology, a tertiary institution that operated in southeast Melbourne from 1982 to 1990 before becoming part of Monash University.

Chisholm Institute has campuses in Dandenong, Springvale, Berwick, Frankston, Wonthaggi, Cranbourne, and Mornington Peninsula Campus along with central Melbourne.

Berwick Technical Education Centre (TEC) was established at the Berwick campus with the new building completed in 2009. A new trade careers centre worth $26 million associated with the TEC was announced in the 2011 State Budget in May.

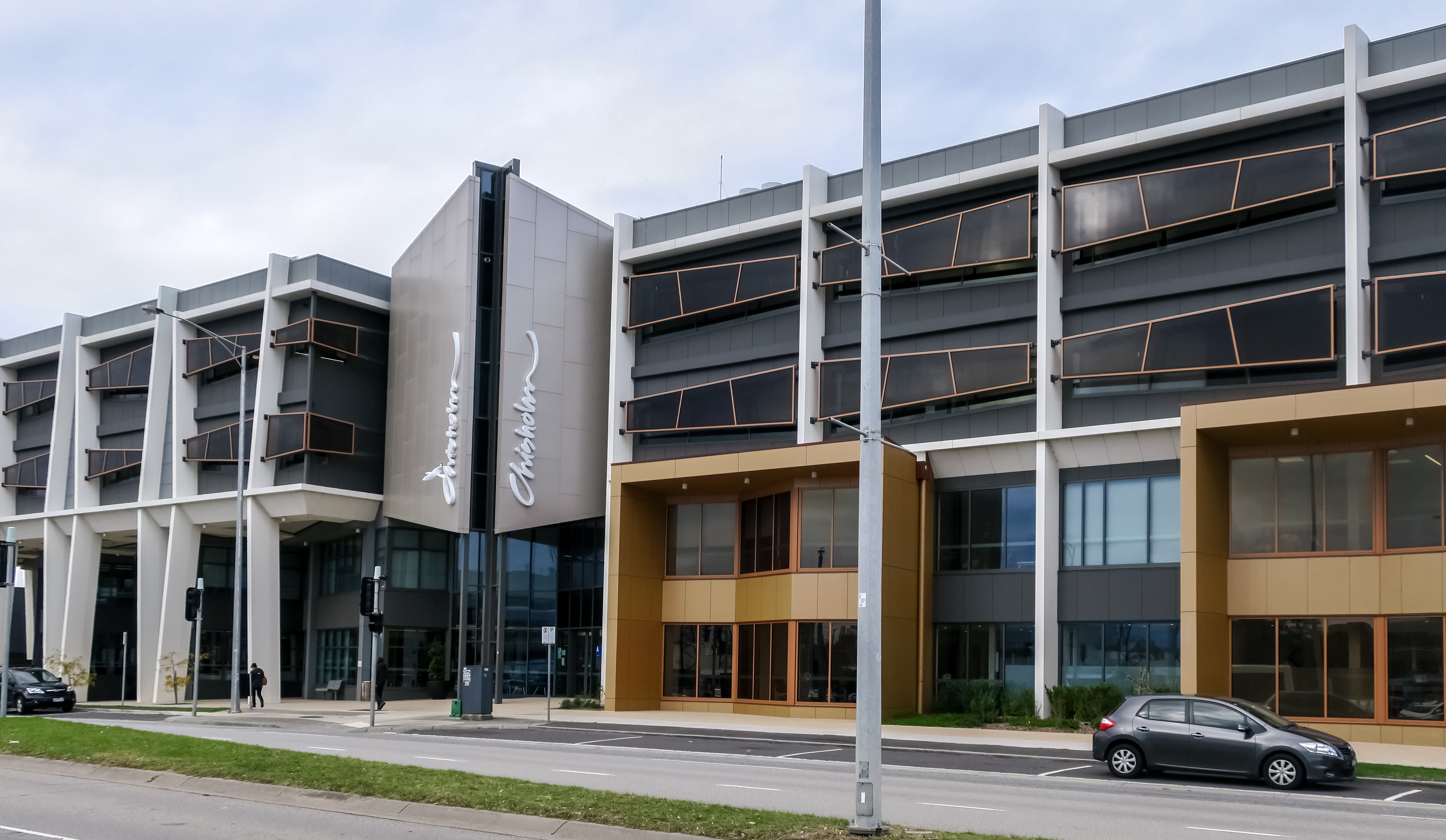
Frankston Chisholm Tafe campus

== See also ==
- List of forestry universities and colleges
