= R. C. Kuhad =

Former Vice Chancellor of Central University of Haryana

R.C. Kuhad was the former Vice Chancellor of Central University of Haryana. He has served Department of Microbiology, University of Delhi South Campus, India as a professor. He is a fellow of the National Academy of Sciences, and National Academy of Agriculture Sciences and other academies.
