= NIILM University, Kaithal =

Private university in Haryana, India

NIILM University
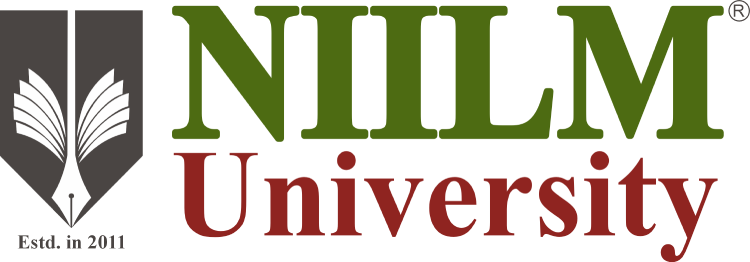
- Logo of NIILM University, Kaithal
- Other name: Northern Institute for Integrated Learning in Management (NIILM)
- Motto: A job for every student.
- Type: Private university
- Established: 2011
- Founder: NIILM Education Trust
- Accreditation: NAAC, NBA, UGC
- Academic affiliations: ACU, AICTE, AIU, AUAP, BCI, COA, ICAR, NCTE, NEC, PCI, WES
- Chairman: Sandeep Chahal
- Chancellor: Maninder Singh Nayar
- Vice-Chancellor: R. C. Kuhad
- Students: 3000+
- Undergraduates: 2000+
- Postgraduates: 1000+
- Doctoral students: 30+
- Other students: 500+
- Location: Kaithal, Haryana, India; 29.8617°N 76.4609°E
- Campus: 22+ acres
- Colours: Gray
- Sporting affiliations: NCC, NSS
- Website: niilmuniversity.ac.in

NIILM University, which stands for the Northern Institute for Integrated Learning in Management (NIILM), is a private university located in Kaithal in the state of Haryana, India. NIILM University is recognized by the University Grants Commission and the Government of Haryana.

Main academic and administrative building of NIILM University

Established in 2011, the multidisciplinary institution offers a range of undergraduate, postgraduate, diploma, and doctoral programs across various fields, including engineering, management, law, science, pharmacy, and the humanities.

== History ==
NIILM University was initially proposed to be established by the NIILM Education Trust in Palwal in June 2009. However, on 4 January 2010, the location was changed to Kaithal during the presentation to the state government. The university was officially established in 2011 by the State Legislature of Haryana through The Haryana Private Universities (Amendment) Act, 2011 (Haryana Act No. 16 of 2011).

== Campus and facilities ==
The university's primary campus spans approximately 22 acres and is situated on National Highway 152 (Ambala Road) in Kaithal, around 160 kilometers northwest of Delhi. The campus infrastructure includes tech-enabled classrooms, cognitive and language development skill labs, a central library, and various sports and hostel facilities. In recent years, the university has also implemented hybrid learning models and virtual laboratories to accommodate both regular students and working professionals.

== Academics and programs ==
The university is multidisciplinary and operates through several constituent faculties and schools:

- School of Engineering and Technology
- School of Commerce and Management
- School of Legal Studies
- School of Hospitality Management
- School of Pharmaceutical Sciences
- School of Applied Sciences
- School of Agricultural Sciences And Forestry
- School of Media and Mass Communication

Through these schools, the university offers degree and diploma academic programs including BCom, MCom, BBA, MBA, BA LLB, B.Tech, M.Tech, B.Pharm, M.Pharm and various vocational diplomas and Ph.D. research degrees.

== Recognitions and approvals ==
NIILM University is a private university holding national accreditations and statutory approvals from several regulatory bodies:

=== Accreditation ===
- National Assessment and Accreditation Council
- National Board of Accreditation
- University Grants Commission

=== Academic affiliations ===
- Association of Commonwealth Universities
- All India Council for Technical Education
- Association of Indian Universities
- Association of the Universities of Asia and the Pacific
- Bar Council of India
- Council of Architecture
- Indian Council of Agricultural Research
- National Council for Teacher Education
- Nepal Engineering Council
- Pharmacy Council of India
- World Education Services

=== Sporting affiliations ===
- National Cadet Corps
- National Service Scheme

== Sports ==
=== Gatka Partnership ===
On 18 December 2025, NIILM University signed a Memorandum of Understanding with the National Gatka Association of India to promote Gatka as an organized competitive sport, providing infrastructure and adopting World Gatka Federation standards.

== Controversies ==
In August 2018, the Haryana Vigilance Bureau registered an FIR against the management of NIILM University for allegedly obtaining approximately ₹17.42 lakh in Post-Matric Scholarship Scheme for Scheduled Caste students by submitting bogus records for the 2016–17 academic year. The scholarship amount was allegedly issued in the names of 12 SC students and later diverted from their bank accounts to the university's account. In May 2025, the Haryana Anti-Corruption Bureau arrested the university's former registrar, Sumesh Kumar Sharma, in connection with the case.
