= Shri Vishwakarma Skill University =

University in Haryana, India

- श्री विश्वकर्मा कौशल विश्वविद्यालय
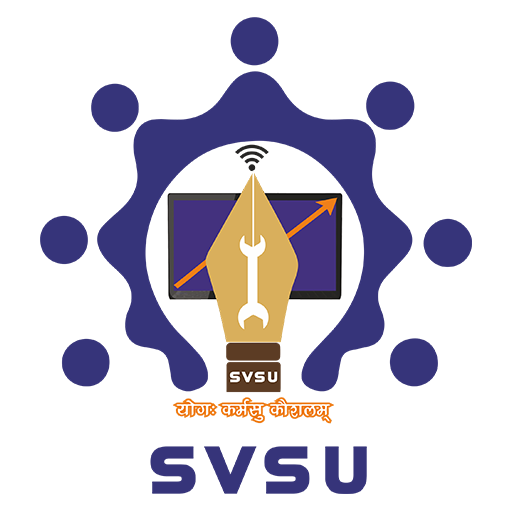
- Other name: SVSU
- Motto: "योगः कर्मसु कौशलम्”
- Motto in English: Learn and Earn, Make Your Mark
- Type: Public
- Established: 2016; 10 years ago
- Chancellor: Governor of Haryana
- Vice-Chancellor: Dr. Dinesh Kumar
- Location: Dudhola, Palwal, Haryana, India; 28.2008°N 77.2652°E
- Campus: 83 acres (34 ha); Dudhola
- Website: www.svsu.ac.in
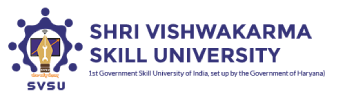

Shri Vishwakarma Skill University, Haryana, earlier known as Haryana Vishwakarma Skill University (HVSU) is a public state university established by the Government of Haryana at Dudhola village of Palwal district of India. It has MoU with several industries and entities to impart skills training.

== History ==
It was established in 2016 via a legislative act of Government of Haryana, to impart skills training.

== Objectives ==
It was set up to develop entrepreneurship and skill based education and research in the emerging areas of various sectors.

== Courses ==
The university offers dual vocational education model in the integrated work and study mode in accordance with the National Skill Qualification Frame work (NSQF), where students will work in the industries across various locations in the State with flexible class timings.

- Skill Faculty of Engineering and Technology
- Skill Faculty of Applied Sciences and Humanities
- Skill Faculty of Management Studies and Research
- Skill Faculty of Agriculture

== Skill Faculty of Engineering and Technology ==
=== Out-Campus Programmes ===
- D.Voc. Mechanical-Manufacturing (ROOP)
- D.Voc. Mechanical-Manufacturing (SENIOR Flexonics, KRISHNA)
- D.Voc. Industrial Electronics (EAST WEST AUTOMATION)
- B.Voc. Mechanical-Manufacturing (ANAND)
- B.Voc. Mechanical-Manufacturing (Hero)
- B.Voc. Mechatronics (Hero)
- B.Voc. Robotics and Automation (JBM Group)
- B.Voc. Production-Tool and Die Manufacturing (JBM Group)
- B.Voc. Solar Technology (QUADSUN SOLAR SOLUTIONS)

=== In-Campus Programmes ===
- B.Tech. Mechanical and Smart Manufacturing (JBM Group)

== Skill Faculty of Applied Sciences and Humanities ==
=== Out-Campus Programmes ===
- Diploma in German Language (CONCENTRIX™)
- Diploma in Graphics and Communication Design (SVSU)
- B.Voc. Medical Laboratory Technology (Healthians, QRG, Rotary Blood Bank Gurugram)
- B.Voc. Public Service (ALS IAS Academy)
- M.Voc. Geo-Informatics (Gurugram Metropolitan Development Authority)
- M.Voc. Public Health (Gurugram Metropolitan Development Authority)

=== In-Campus Programmes ===
- Diploma in Yoga (SVSU)
- Diploma in Music (Folk Art-Banchari)
- Diploma in Japanese Language (SVSU)
- Diploma in English Language (SVSU)

== Skill Faculty of Management Studies and Research ==
=== Out-Campus Programmes ===
- Diploma in Food Production and Traditional Sweets (BIKANERVALA)
- B.B.A. in Retail Management (Maruti Suzuki)
- B.Voc. Management-BPM and Analytics (CONCENTRIX)
- M.Voc. Management-Banking and Finance (HDFC Bank)
- M.Voc. Management-HRM (Mount Talent)
- M.Voc. Entrepreneurship (A C Sangam, AIM)

=== In-Campus Programmes ===
- B.Voc. Management-Financial Services (SVSU)
- M.B.A. (IIMBx, Grant Thornton, Super Screws(P) Ltd.)
- M.B.A. Business Analytics (IIMBx, Grant Thornton, Super Screws(P) Ltd.)

== Skill Faculty of Agriculture ==
=== Out-Campus Programmes ===
- B.Voc. Agriculture (Shivansh Farming)
- M.Voc. Agriculture (Shivansh Farming)

== List of Short Term Programmes ==
- Organic Farming (3M)
- Hydroponic Producer (3M)
- Certificate in Music-Vocal (3M)
- Certificate in Music-Instrumental(Harmonium) (3M)
- Phlebotomist Technician (3M)
- General Duty Assistant (3M)
- Geriatrics (Elderly Care) (3M)
- Certificate in Sharda Lipi (4M)
- Block chain Developer (6M)
- Data Entry Operator (4M)
- Data Scientist (9M)
- IOT-Hardware Solution Designer (6M)
- Multimedia Developer (6M)
- Research Associate (3M)
- Office Coordinator (4M)
- Microfinance Associate (3M)
- Tally Assistant (2M)
- House Keeping Executive (6M)
- Food and Beverage Server (3M)
- Multi Cuisine Commi(Cook) (6M)
- Sattvik Quality Management Auditor (6M)
- Sales Executive (3M)
- GST Assistant (1.5M)

== See also ==
- SVSU Sr. Sec. Skill School (Feeder School)
- List of institutions of higher education in Haryana
