= Dudhola =

- village
- Location in Haryana, India Dudhola (India)
- Coordinates: 28.2008346°N 77.2652153°E
- Country: India
- State: Haryana
- District: Palwal district

Languages
  - Official: Hindi
- Time zone: UTC+5:30 (IST)
- Postal code: 121102
- Telephone code: +91-01275-XXXXXX
- Vehicle registration: HR-30
- Website: haryana.gov.in

Dudhola is a village in Palwal tehsil and block of Palwal district of Haryana state in India. Shri Vishwakarma Skill University is based here at Dudhola.

Sarpanch :- Sunil Chaudhary s/o Ganga Ram sastri ji

== Demography ==
Hindi is main language spoken here.

== Administration ==
Dudhola is locally governed by the gram panchayat.

== Economy ==
Dudhola is a main industrial area in the influence zone of Delhi Mumbai Industrial Corridor, Amritsar Delhi Kolkata Industrial Corridor, Eastern Dedicated Freight Corridor, Western Dedicated Freight Corridor and Delhi Western Peripheral Expressway in NCR region.

== Education ==
Shri Vishwakarma Skill University (SVSU) earlier known as Haryana Vishwakarma Skill University (HVSU) was established at Dudhola by the Government of Haryana, via a legislative act of Government of Haryana in 2016, to impart skills training. it is led by the Vice-Chancellor Raj Nehru, and Registrar Sunil Gupta.
