= Shri Krishna AYUSH University =

Public university in Kurukshetra, India

- Other name: SKAU
- Motto: "ॐ सर्वे भवन्तु सुखिनः। सर्वे सन्तु निरामयाः।". "Om, may all be happy; may all be free from illness."
- Type: Education and Research
- Established: 2017; 9 years ago
- Accreditation: NAAC (A++ Grade)
- Affiliations: UGC; NAAC; AIU
- Chancellor: Governor of Haryana
- Vice-Chancellor: Vd. Kartar Singh Dhiman
- Faculty: 256
- Administrative staff: 450
- Students: 10,000 +
- Postgraduates: 3,000 +
- Location: Kurukshetra, Haryana, India; 29°57′40″N 76°52′01″E
- Campus: Urban
- Website: skau.ac.in

Shri Krishna AYUSH University is a university established by Haryana Government by act no. 25 of 2017. It started functioning from academic year 2018-19 and has headquarters in Sector 8, Kurukshetra city of Haryana, India. Current Vice Chancellor of Shri Krishna Ayush University is Vaidya Kartar Singh Dhiman . Shri Krishna Ayush University is first university of its kind in the world which offers all the AYUSH courses.

== Courses ==
S. No.	Discipline	Intake	Full Time\Part Time
1	BAMS (Bachelor in Ayurvedic Medicine & Surgery)	120	Full Time
2	BHMS (Bachelor in Homeopathic Medicine & Surgery)	120	Full Time
3	BYMS (Bachelor in Yoga Medicine & Surgery)	60	Full Time
4	BUMS (Bachelor in Unani Medicine & Surgery)	120	Full Time
5	BSMS (Bachelor in Siddha Medicine & Surgery)	120	Full Time
6	BSMS (Bachelor in Siddha Medicine & Surgery)	60	Full Time

Panchkarma Certificate Course (One Year) Post Graduation MD and MS (All departments) Phd (All departments)
