= Pali, Rewari =

Pali
- Village
- Location in Haryana, India Pali (India)
- Coordinates: 28.1640095°N 76.4505203°E
- Country: India
- State: Haryana
- District: Rewari
- Established: along 500 years
- Founder: Pal
  - Rank: 1

Population (2011)
  - Total: 3,666

Languages
  - Official: Hindi, Haryanvi
- Time zone: UTC+5:30 (IST)
- PIN: 123102
- ISO 3166 code: HR-IN
- Vehicle registration: HR-36
- Nearest city: Rewari
- Lok Sabha constituency: Gurgaon
- Vidhan Sabha constituency: Bawal
- Website: haryana.gov.in

Pali is one of the bigger villages of Rewari district in Haryana state of India. The village is situated on NH 11 on Rewari Narnaul Road. It is also known for the work of the youth of the village who are on the mission to make the village clean and green. There is Punjab National Bank, Cooperative Bank, a post office, Women Degree College, Sr. Sec. School, two private schools, one college of education and a railway station.

Wing Commander Manoj Kumar Yadav, son of Sh. Jai Lal Yadav, is the first Commissioned Officer in the Indian Air Force. He joined directly as Commissioned Officer in 2002.

The village is also known for its service people in defence with hundreds of people from this village having served in the army, or are currently serving.

This village is famous for 'Baba Neemadi Wala' temple located on the Hill.

== Demographics ==
At the 2011 census the total population of this village was 3,666, of which 1923 are males and 1743 are females.
