= J.C. Bose University of Science and Technology, YMCA =

University in Faridabad, India

Coordinates: 28.3674749°N 77.3158949°E

- Motto: Vidya Paramam Bhushnam
- Type: Public
- Established: 1969
- Chancellor: Governor of Haryana
- Vice-Chancellor: Rajive Kumar
- Location: Faridabad, Haryana, India
- Campus: Fully residential
- Website: jcboseust.ac.in

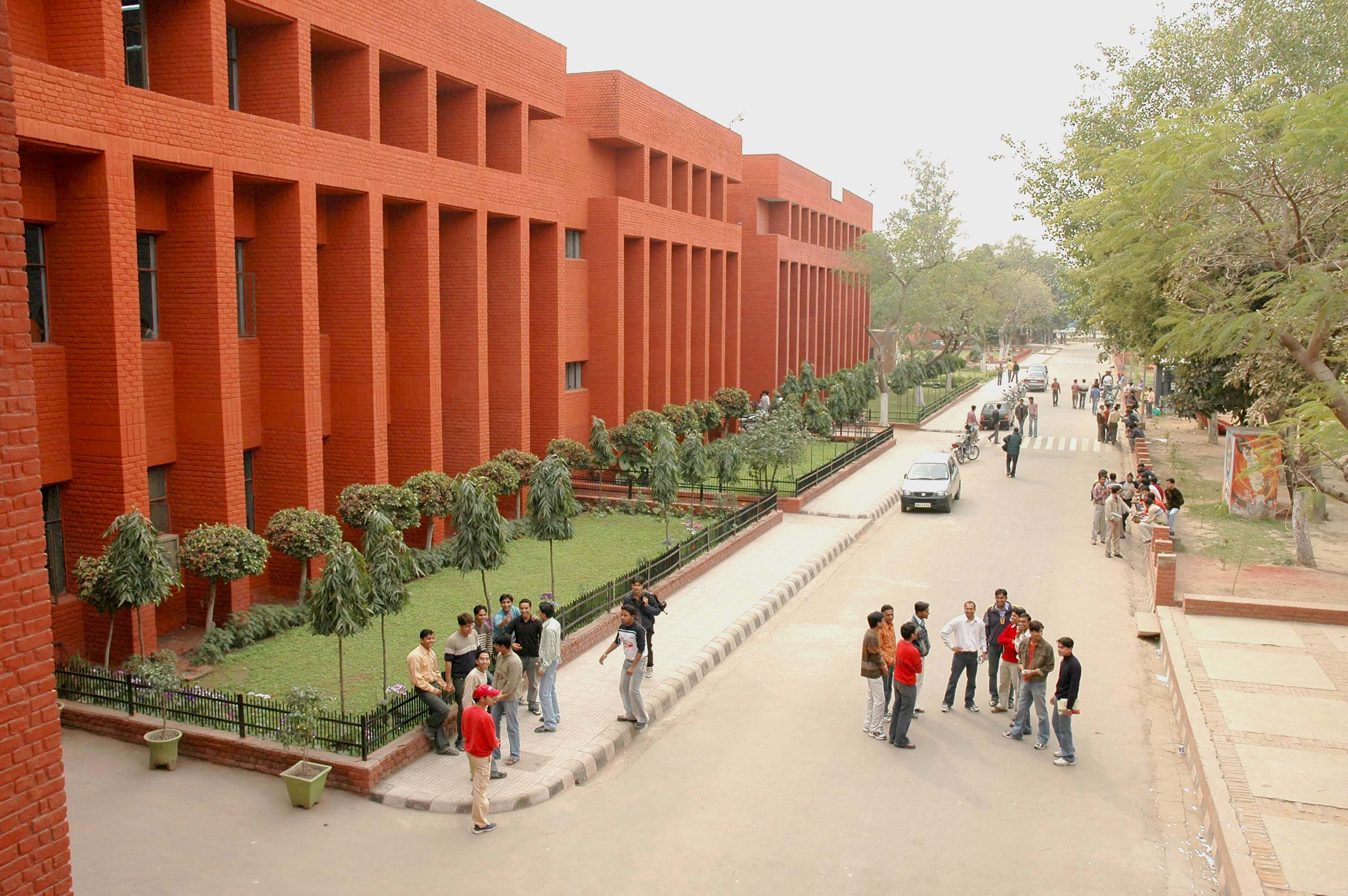
YMCA University campus

J.C. Bose University of Science and Technology, YMCA, formerly YMCA University of Science and Technology (YMCA UST) and YMCA Institute of Engineering (YMCAIE), is a state public university located in Faridabad, in the state of Haryana, India. Established as a college in 1969, it gained university status in December 2009 and was renamed in 2018.

== History ==
J.C. Bose University was established in 1969 as an Indo-German project, a joint venture of the National Council of YMCAs of India, the Government of Haryana and the German Central Agencies for Development Aid, Bonn, Germany. It was affiliated to M.D. University. In 1996 the state government took full control over the college. In 2009 it became a university through the YMCA University of Science and Technology Faridabad Act, 2009. In 2018 it was renamed to its current name through the YMCA University of Science and Technology Faridabad (Amendment) Act, 2018.

== Campus ==
The campus of the J.C. Bose University of Science and Technology, YMCA is located in the Faridabad (city comes under National Capital Region (India)). (Faridabad-Ballabhgarh Industrial complex), on NH-2 about 30 km from New Delhi.

The Campus has three main buildings, one for MBA and the remaining two for other science and technology courses, plus a Girls' Hostel and a library named Deen Dayal Upadhyay Library. There is an auditorium in the MBA block (1st floor), an auditorium cum indoor badminton courts (commonly known as Shakuntalam), a canteen, a stationery shop, an Indian Overseas bank and a Mother Dairy which remains open during university hours. Sports amenities include a basketball court, two badminton courts inside the auditorium, a football/cricket ground and an archery area. A free dispensary is also there which opens during university hours.

== Academics ==
YMCA University offers undergraduate B.Tech and graduate Master of Technology (M.Tech) courses in various engineering fields. It also offers other postgraduate courses offering Master of Science, Master of Arts and Master of Business Administration, Master of Computer Applications degrees.

The University also offers three-year degree courses like Bachelor of Computer Application (BCA), Bachelor of Business Administration (BBA), Bachelor of Science in subjects Physics, Chemistry, Maths, and Animation & Multimedia.

== Rankings ==
University and college rankings

Engineering – India
- NIRF (2024): 151-200

The National Institutional Ranking Framework (NIRF) ranked it 151-200 among engineering colleges in 2024.

== Student life ==
There are various cultural as well as technical clubs/societies of which the students can be a part of. YMCA University holds several annual festivals. 'ELEMENTS CULMYCA' is the annual cultural festival, which takes place in mid March where young students from all over India showcase their talents. KHOJ, the annual technical festival, involves students from technical institutions from the country. CONCOURSE is the annual sports meet.

There are various student societies, cultural as well as technical for all-round development of the students. These student-run societies are encouraged by the university to further develop the character and personality traits and broaden the horizon of the students. They are:

=== Student Council ===
The Student Council is a formal, elected body of student representatives that serves as the voice of the students. It plays a crucial role in enhancing the student experience and shaping the overall environment of the university.

=== Cultural societies ===
==== Ananya, The Unparalleled: The Lit-Deb Soc ====
This is the Literary and Debating Society of the University and has won many accolades in various inter-college competitions and fests in the fields of Conventional Debates, Parliamentary Debates, MUNs, JAMs, Extempore, Poetry, Creative Writing, etc.

The society also maintains a board known as 'Furore' where various write-ups are put up by the members of the society along with recent achievements of its members. Senior members mentor the Juniors to participate and win competitions. This exposure leads the members to become excellent public speakers and gives them confidence which helps them everywhere, from interviews to life overall.

Ananya, The Unparalleled is also responsible for hosting major events of the college like The Foundation Day, College Fests, Induction, Freshers etc.

Along with that, this society also organizes various competitions from time to time which attracts pan-India participation.

==== Vividha - The Dramatics ====
This is the Dramatics Society of the University and has participated and won in many inter-college competitions, they educate students of the university on social causes through their dramas and skits and also perform on important events of the university like, Foundation Day, Fests etc.

==== Jhalak - The Photography Club ====
This club covers all the events of the university and are responsible for capturing all kinds of memories and emotions that run through the campus. Seniors mentor and inspire juniors to hone their photography skills.

==== Tarannum - The Music Club ====
This club contributes to the music and activity of the University.

==== Natraja - The Dancing Club ====
This club revolves around dance and guides its members to perform in an excellent way on important events of the university and also compete in inter college competitions.

==== Eklavya - The Sports Club ====
It is the sports club of the university.

=== Technical Societies ===
==== Manan, A Techno Surge: The Tech Soc ====
This is the Information Technological Society of the University and has won many accolades in various inter-college competitions, fests and hackathons.

The club is a university-based organization focused on technology. Its members participate in technical activities and professional development initiatives. Alumni and members of the club have subsequently been employed by technology companies, including Amazon and Samsung.

The students can get entry in the club through its entrance test, Manthan, followed by a Project showcasing round and a P.I. round.

There are other clubs as well in the technical field like Microbird(ECE), Mechnext(Mechanical), etc.

==== Microbird - The Techno Club ====
This is the Technical Society of the University.

Beside these there is also NCC (National Cadet Corps) and NSS (National Service Scheme)

==== Mechnext - The Mechatronics Society ====
This is the technical society of JC Bose UST, YMCA who deals with hands-on projects and projects on industrial level. It deals with overall development of the students including at technical and personal level.

== Hostels ==
YMCA University has eight hostels in total. These are :

Hostels
Details
Boys' Hostels

    Under construction

Girls' Hostels
1. Kalpana Chawla Hall (28 rooms)
2. Sarojini Hall (21 rooms)
3. Mother Teressa Hall (22 rooms)
4. Kasturba Hall (22 rooms)

== See also ==
- State University of Performing And Visual Arts
- State Institute of Film and Television
