= Technical Education Centre =

Technical Education Centres (TEC) are purpose built centres for the delivery of practical secondary school and vocational education programs on a TAFE campus in the state of Victoria, Australia. They aim to attract young people 16–19 years of age to provide trade skills training while they complete a secondary school certificate. Each TEC is administered by the TAFE Institute it is a part of.

The Centres offer courses in the Victorian Certificate of Applied Learning (VCAL) at Junior, Intermediate and Senior levels with trade streams and various pre-apprenticeship and pre-vocational courses in trade skills such as bricklaying, cabinet making, carpentry, painting, plumbing and shop fitting.

TECs are located at Berwick and Heidelberg in suburban Melbourne, and Ballarat and Wangaratta in regional Victoria.

- Ballarat TEC was established as part of the University of Ballarat, at the SMB campus, Lydiard Street South.
- Berwick TEC was established at Chisholm Institute of TAFE, at the Berwick campus. Centre completed in 2009. A new trade careers centre worth $26 million associated with the TEC was announced in the 2011 State Budget in May.
- Wangaratta TEC was established at Goulburn Ovens Institute of TAFE, at the Wangaratta campus in Docker Street. Initial enrolments of 170 students exceeded expectations. Centre opened in 2007.
- Heidelberg TEC was established at Northern Melbourne Institute of TAFE (NMIT), at the Heidelberg campus. The $8million Heidelberg Technical Education Centre was opened in May 2010.

The Vocational College at Holmesglen Institute of TAFE, while not classified as a TEC, offers a similar range of opportunities.
