= Starex University =

Private university in Haryana, India

- Starex University's official logo
- Other name: SU
- Motto: Nunc Est Semper.
- Motto in English: Now is Forever
- Type: Private
- Established: 2016; 10 years ago
- Affiliations: UGC; AIU
- Chancellor: Mohinder Singh
- Vice-Chancellor: Prof. Madhu Parhar
- Academic staff: 120
- Administrative staff: 180
- Students: 5,000+
- Undergraduates: 3,500+
- Postgraduates: 2,000+
- Doctoral students: 986
- Location: Gurgaon, Haryana, India
- Campus: Urban
- Website: starexuniversity.com

Starex University is a private university located in the village Binola, Gurgaon district, Haryana, India. The university was established in 2016 by the Starex group through The Haryana Private Universities (Second Amendment) Act, 2016, which was passed in August 2016, making it the 20th private university to be established through The Haryana Private Universities Act, 2006.

== Affiliations ==
The university has following affiliations from educational governing bodies of india.

- University Grants Commission (India)
- National Assessment and Accreditation Council
- Pharmacy Council of India
- Bar Council of India
- Association of Indian Universities
- All India Council for Technical Education

== Campus ==
Starex University campus sprawls over 35 acres (14 ha) on Highway NH-48, between New Delhi and Jaipur. The campus houses separate boys and girls hostels.

== Departments ==
The university comprises the following schools:

- School of Physical Sciences
- School of Agriculture Sciences
- School of Commerce & Management
- School of Computer Sciences & Technology
- School of Pharmaceutical Sciences
- School of Hotel Management
- School of Humanities
- School of Law
- School of Life Sciences
- School of Paramedical Sciences
- College of Pharmacy
- Doctorate Courses (Phd)

== See also ==
- Education in India
- Indian Defence University
- University Grants Commission (India)
- Amity University, Noida
- List of institutions of higher education in Haryana
