= IILM Institute for Higher Education =

Education institute in New Delhi, India

Coordinates: 28.5874945°N 77.227996°E

- Type: Business School
- Established: 1993
- Location: New Delhi, India
- Website: iilm.edu/lodhiroad

IILM Institute for Higher Education is an institute of higher education headquartered in Lodi Road, New Delhi, India, with a second campus in Greater Noida, Uttar Pradesh. It was established in 1993 in Gurgaon, Haryana. In 2018, the Gurgaon institute was declared a private university, IILM University.

== Campuses ==
The Lodi Road, New Delhi campus is located in Lutyens' Delhi and houses the IILM Institute for Higher Education and the IILM Undergraduate business school. The Greater Noida campus, located in the Knowledge Park educational zone, comprises the College of Engineering and Technology, the College of Pharmacy, and the Graduate School of Management. Engineering and pharmacy courses are affiliated with Uttar Pradesh Technical University.

== Notable Alumni ==
- Bhavleen Kaur.
