= MVN University =

University in the Delhi area, India

Coordinates: 28.01°N 77.33°E

- Motto: Creating the leaders in higher education with core values.
- Type: Non-Profit Private
- Established: 2012
- Affiliations: UGC, BCI, PCI, AIU
- Chancellor: Sh. Varun Sharma
- Vice-Chancellor: Dr. Arun Garg
- Location: Delhi-NCR, Haryana, India
- Website: mvn.edu.in

MVN University, located on NH2, Delhi-Agra National highway, Delhi NCR Region, Haryana, India, is a private university. It was established in 2012 by State Legislature under Haryana Private Universities Act 32 of 2006 (Amendment) Act 2010. MVNU is part of Modern Vidya Niketan Society, the managing body. It offers wide range of undergraduate, postgraduate and doctoral programmes.

== Schools ==
- School of Engineering & Technology
- School of Business management & Commerce
- School of Art, Science & Humanities
- School of Law
- School of Pharmaceutical Sciences
- School of Allied Health Sciences
- School of Agriculture

== Campus ==
University has 88 acres of sprawling campus having ACclass rooms, laboratories, Gym, Boys hostel, cafeteria & central library,

== Recognition ==
Like all universities in India, MVN University is approved by the University Grants Commission (UGC). The programmes by the School of Law are approved by the Bar Council of India (BCI) and the pharmacy diploma and degree programmes offered by the School of Pharmaceutical Sciences are approved by the Pharmacy Council of India (PCI). The university is also a member of the Association of Indian Universities (AIU).
