= Shree Guru Gobind Singh Tricentenary University =

Private university in Haryana, India

- Other name: SGT University
- Motto: Leadership, Innovation, Ethics
- Type: Private
- Established: 2013
- Accreditation: NAAC A+
- Affiliations: UGC
- Chancellor: Ram Bahadur Rai
- Vice-Chancellor: Basuthkar Jagadeeshwar Rao (acting)
- Location: Budhera, Gurugram, Haryana, India; 28.478445°N 76.903845°E
- Campus: Urban
- Website: sgtuniversity.ac.in

Shree Guru Gobind Singh Tricentenary University, commonly called SGT University, is located in Budhera, Gurugram district, Haryana, India, in the vicinity of Sultanpur National Park. In October 2023, it was awarded 'A+' by the National Assessment and Accreditation Council (NAAC).

== History ==
=== Early Phase ===
The origins of SGT University trace back to the establishment of the Dashmesh Educational Charitable Trust in 1999.The trust was created with the objective of promoting higher and technical education in the National Capital Region of India.

In 2002, the trust established the SGT Dental College, Hospital and Research Institute, which became the foundation of its educational activities. This institution marked the beginning of a broader initiative to develop professional education infrastructure, particularly in healthcare and allied sciences.

=== Expansion ===
Following the establishment of the dental college, the trust progressively expanded its academic footprint by setting up additional institutions across various disciplines. During the 2000s, new colleges and institutes were introduced in areas such as physiotherapy, nursing, and other health sciences.

This phase of development reflected a gradual transition from a single-institution model to a multi-disciplinary educational group, commonly referred to as the SGT Group of Institutions. The expansion was characterized by the addition of infrastructure, faculty, and academic programs, enabling the group to cater to a growing number of students across different fields of study.

=== Establishment as a university ===
In 2013, the SGT Group of Institutions was granted university status under the Haryana Private Universities (Amendment) Act No. 8 of 2013. This legislative act formally established SGT University as a private university in the state of Haryana.Directorate of Higher Education, Haryana

Since its establishment as a university, SGT University has developed as a multidisciplinary institution offering academic programmes across 19 streams. The university provides more than 200 undergraduate, postgraduate, and doctoral programmes spanning fields such as medical and health sciences, engineering, management, law, and other disciplines. It continues to operate under the aegis of the Dashmesh Educational Charitable Trust.

== Rankings ==
In the Times Higher Education World University Rankings 2026, Shree Guru Gobind Singh Tricentenary University was placed in the 1501+ band. In the same edition's subject tables it was ranked in the 1001+ band for clinical and health subjects and the 801–1000 band for physical sciences.

In the Times Higher Education Impact Rankings, which assess universities against the United Nations Sustainable Development Goals (SDGs), the university was placed in the 601–800 band overall in 2026. Its positions against individual SDGs were:

- SDG 2 (Zero Hunger), 2026: = 98th
- SDG 3 (Good Health and Well-being), 2026: 61st
- SDG 4 (Quality Education), 2026: 601–800
- SDG 5 (Gender Equality), 2026: 401–600
- SDG 6 (Clean Water and Sanitation), 2025: 601–800
- SDG 17 (Partnerships for the Goals), 2026: 401–600

In the India Today Best Colleges Rankings 2026, the university's constituent SGT Dental College, Hospital & Research Institute was ranked 37th among dental colleges in India.

== Accreditation and recognition ==
Shree Guru Gobind Singh Tricentenary University is recognised by the University Grants Commission (UGC). In October 2023 it was accredited with an 'A+' grade by the National Assessment and Accreditation Council (NAAC).

The university's programmes are approved by the relevant statutory regulatory bodies, and its teaching hospital and laboratories hold separate accreditations:

Accreditations and statutory approvals
Body	Scope
National Assessment and Accreditation Council (NAAC)	Institutional ('A+')
National Accreditation Board for Hospitals & Healthcare Providers (NABH)	Teaching hospital
National Accreditation Board for Testing and Calibration Laboratories (NABL)	Laboratories
National Medical Commission (NMC)	Medicine
Dental Council of India (DCI)	Dentistry
Indian Nursing Council (INC)	Nursing
Pharmacy Council of India (PCI)	Pharmacy
Bar Council of India (BCI)	Law
National Council for Teacher Education (NCTE)	Education

== Faculties ==
The university offers undergraduate, postgraduate, and doctoral programs through its 19 faculties and schools. These include medicine, dentistry, nursing, pharmacy, allied health sciences, engineering, law, management, education, agriculture, design, humanities, media studies, hospitality, and Indian systems of medicine.

The university's academic units comprise:

- Faculty of Medicine & Health Sciences
- School of Engineering & Technology
- Faculty of Law
- School of Commerce & Management
- School of Emerging Media, Communication and Film Studies
- School of Hotel & Tourism Management
- School of Basic and Applied Sciences
- Faculty of Education
- SGT College of Pharmacy
- Faculty of Dental Sciences
- Faculty of Indian Medical System
- Faculty of Nursing
- School of Physiotherapy
- School of Behavioural Sciences
- School of Allied Health Sciences
- School of Design
- Faculty of Agricultural Sciences
- School of Naturopathy & Yogic Sciences
- School of Humanities, Social Sciences and Liberal Arts.

The university offers programmes at diploma, undergraduate, postgraduate, and doctoral levels through these faculties and schools. The intake in medical, dental and Ayurveda undergraduate programs is through the Haryana state counselling DMER (dmer.haryana.gov.in) after qualifying national level exam NATIONAL ELIGIBILITY CUM ENTRANCE TEST | NEET | India which is conducted by the National Testing Agency. The admission in postgraduate courses is through NEET (PG) and NEET MDS for medical and dental courses respectively.

For the other courses, the university offers multiple admission pathways like clearing national level exams like CUET along with providing the direct admission pathways based on scores of qualifying examinations.

Check all 19 Faculties at: https://sgtuniversity.ac.in/faculty-listing

== See also ==
- List of medical colleges in Haryana
