= Sushant University =

Private university in Haryana, India

- Motto: Soaring High
- Type: Private
- Established: 2012
- Chancellor: J. S. Mishra, IAS (Retd.)
- Vice-Chancellor: Rakesh Ranjan
- Location: Gurgaon, Haryana, India; 28.431°N 77.111°E
- Campus: Urban
- Website: sushantuniversity.edu.in

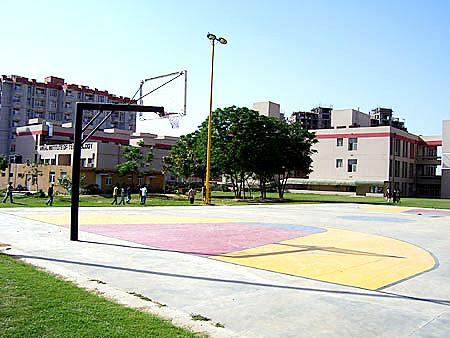
Sushant University campus

Sushant University, formerly Ansal University (AU) is a private university situated in Gurgaon, National Capital Region (NCR), India. It was established in 2012 through the Haryana Private Universities Act (Amendment) 2012. It was previously a private college affiliated with Guru Gobind Singh Indraprastha University, established in August 2000 under the Chiranjiv Charitable Trust. In 2020 it was renamed to its current name, under the Haryana Private Universities (Amendment) Act, 2020.

== Location ==
Sushant University is located in the foothills of Aravalli Range on the Golf Course Road with facilities on a 15-acre (61,000 m^{2}) campus.
