= Chaudhary Devi Lal University =

University in Sirsa district, Haryana, India

- Motto: श्रद्धावान लभते ज्ञानं
- Type: Government
- Established: 2 April 2003; 23 years ago
- Chancellor: Governor of Haryana
- Vice-Chancellor: Vijay Kumar
- Location: Sirsa, Haryana, 125055, India; 29.5467887°N 75.0445588°E
- Website: www.cdlu.ac.in

Chaudhary Devi Lal University is a government university located in Sirsa district in the Indian state of Haryana. It was named after Chaudhary Devi Lal, former deputy prime minister of India. The university was established by the Government of Haryana on 2 April 2003. The University has twenty-four academic departments that offer 21 career-oriented and specialized courses to students.

== Faculties ==
S. No.	Faculty
1.	Faculty of Life Sciences
2.	Faculty of Humanities
3.	Faculty of Commerce and Management
4.	Faculty of Physical Sciences
5.	Faculty of Education
6.	Faculty of Law
7.	Faculty of Social Sciences
8.	Faculty of Engineering and Technology
9.	Dean Academic Affairs
10.	Dean of Colleges

== Academic departments ==
Sr. No.	Name of Department
1.	Biotechnology
2.	Business Administration
3.	Chemistry
4.	Commerce
5.	Computer Science and Applications
6.	Economics
7.	Education
8.	Energy & Environmental Sciences
9.	English
10.	Food Science & Technology
11.	Journalism & Mass Communication
12.	Law
13.	Mathematics
14.	Physical Education
15.	Physics
16.	Public Administration
17.	Hindi
18.	Punjabi
19.	Sanskrit
20.	History & Archeology
21.	Geography
22.	Music (Vocal & Instrumental)
23.	Botany
24.	Zoology
