= Neki Ram Sharma Government College =

Coordinates: 28.8860863°N 76.6074635°E

Pandit Neki Ram Sharma Government College is a degree-granting institution located in Rohtak, Haryana, India. The college is affiliated with Maharshi Dayanand University. Established in 1927, it has a long history of academic contributions. Also known as Pt. Neki Ram Sharma Government College, this institution in Rohtak offers a variety of postgraduate, undergraduate, and honors level programs to both male and female students. Initially, the college started its journey as Govt. Intermediate College in 1927 and later upgraded to a degree-granting college in 1944. In July 1980, the administrative control of the college was handed over to Maharshi Dayanand University, Rohtak and it was subsequently renamed as University College, Rohtak. However, the Haryana State Government regained control over the college in April 2006. Since then, it has been known as Pandit Neki Ram Sharma Government College, Rohtak. Throughout its history, the college has consistently made progress in academic, cultural, and intellectual spheres.
