= Chaudhary Ranbir Singh University =

State university in Jind, Haryana, India

- Type: State Govt. University
- Established: 2014
- Chancellor: Governor of Haryana
- Vice-Chancellor: Ram Pal Saini
- Location: Jind, Haryana, India; 29.293342°N 76.338630°E
- Language: English & Hindi
- Website: crsu.ac.in

Chaudhary Ranbir Singh University (CRSU), formerly Kurukshetra University Post Graduate Regional Centre, is a state university in the city of Jind, Haryana, India. Established by the state Legislature Act 28 of 2014 on 24 July..Its jurisdiction extends over Jind .

== History ==
Chaudhary Ranbir Singh University was established as Kurukshetra University Post Graduate Regional Centre in August 2007. The university was established by Government of Haryana vide an ordinance on 4 July 2014. The university was inaugurated on 25 July 2014 and recognized by the University Grants Commission as a State University.

Earlier university affiliated all the college of education in Haryana state during 2016-17 with Dr. Savita Kumari Sheoran as its first Deputy Dean of Colleges

== See also ==
- State University of Performing And Visual Arts
- State Institute of Film and Television
- University Grants Commission
