= GD Goenka University =

Private university in Haryana, India

- GD Goenka
- Other name: None
- Motto: Foundation To Flight
- Type: Private
- Established: 2013
- Accreditation: UGC & ICAR
- Chancellor: Renu Goenka
- President: Suku Bhaskaran
- Location: Sohna, Gurugram, Haryana, India
- Campus: 60 acres (24 ha)
- Colours: Blue
- Website: gdgoenkauniversity.com

GD Goenka University is a private university located in Sohna, Gurugram, Haryana, India. It was established in 2013 by the GD Goenka Group through the Haryana Private Universities (Amendment) Act, 2013. The GD Goenka Group was founded by Shri A.K. Goenka. GD Goenka University is approved by University Grants Commission (UGC).

== Academics ==
GD Goenka University is a UGC-approved university.

GD Goenka University is now on the private university list of CUET 2023.

== Student life ==
As part of the teaching practices, students are encouraged to document and present their work to experts. All the schools regularly conduct conferences and seminars where speakers, practicing managers and faculty researchers participate. Some of the events are REDSET, ELIXIR, ICON, ICAP, Media clave, Agora, Code, Ihost, Mootcourt, Speed, ERA, and Udyami Bazaar.

The university organizes several events and other extra-curricular activities. Acceleron, Sportopia, Reva, Transcend, Research Conclave are some of the available activities.
