= K.R. Mangalam University =

Private university in Haryana, India

K. R. Mangalam University
- Motto: The Complete World of Education
- Type: Not-for-profit private
- Established: 2013
- Affiliations: UGC, AIU
- Chairman: Yashdev Gupta
- Chancellor: Dinesh Singh
- Vice-Chancellor: Dr. Anil Kumar Saini
- Academic staff: 700+
- Location: Gurugram, India; 28.2712°N 77.0679°E
- Campus: 35 acres (14 ha); Urban
- Colours: Blue and Red
- Nickname: KRMU
- Website: krmangalam.edu.in

K. R. Mangalam University, a NAAC A–accredited private university is located in Gurugram district, India. The university was established in 2013 by the K.R. Mangalam Group through the Haryana Private Universities (Amendment) Act, 2013. The university is approved by the University Grants Commission (UGC) and is competent to award degrees as instructed by the UGC under section 22 of the UGC Act, 1956. K.R. Mangalam University holds the Global Sustainability Impact Rating Band of 601–800 (out of 1,603+ institutions worldwide) in the Times Higher Education (THE) Sustainability Impact Ratings 2026.

== Campus ==
The K.R. Mangalam University campus is located on Sohna Road, Gurugram, Haryana. A campus of over 35 acres (14 ha) is 39.9 km (24.8 mi) away from Indira Gandhi International Airport via NH248A and NH48. The university is between the Aravalli Hills and is connected with the National Capital Region within proximity. Facilities at KRMU include a library, Amphitheatre classrooms, conference rooms, computer labs, an engineering kitchen, subsidized buses, and a Wi-Fi enabled campus.

K.R. Mangalam University has a separate girls' and boys' hostel with full-time security. The campus provides a designated area for extra-curricular activities, such as a football field, cricket pitch, badminton and tennis courts, an indoor sports area, theatre space, and more. The university also has a gym. The campus is fully secured under 24x7 camera surveillance and security guards. More than 100 buses provide transportation around the capital. KRMU also has an ambulance, doctor-on-call and fire engine to respond to emergencies.

== Schools ==
The university is organised into the following schools:

- School of Engineering & Technology
- School of Management & Commerce
- School of Legal Studies
- School of Medical & Allied Sciences
- School of Physiotherapy and Rehabilitation Sciences
- School of Liberal Arts
- School of Architecture & Design
- School of Basic & Applied Sciences
- School of Emerging Media & Creator Economy
- School of Agricultural Sciences

== Academics ==
=== Admission ===
Admission requirements vary by programme. Applicants from recognised school boards are selected through the university's entrance test, the K.R. Mangalam University Entrance Exam (KREE), followed by a faculty interview, or for some programmes through merit-based admission on the basis of qualifying examination results. Scores in national examinations such as JEE Main, CUET and CLAT are considered for scholarships.

=== Academic Programmes ===
K.R. Mangalam University offers academic programmes at undergraduate, postgraduate, doctoral and diploma levels. Its academic offerings cover fields including:

- Engineering and technology
- Management and commerce
- Law
- Medical and allied sciences
- Liberal arts
- Architecture and design
- Basic and applied sciences
- Agriculture
- Physiotherapy
- Emerging media

The university's academic structure includes interdisciplinary programmes and programmes with practical, project-based and field-based components. Its institutional documents describe the use of a choice-based credit system and periodic curriculum revision based on feedback from students, teachers, employers and other stakeholders.

== Research ==
Research at the university is coordinated by the Research and Development Cell, which oversees interdisciplinary work across the university's schools. Associated units include a Central Instrumentation Facility, the K.R. Mangalam Entrepreneurship and Innovation Centre, and a cell handling intellectual property and research ethics. The university offers doctoral programmes across its schools and operates a number of research centres and laboratories.

=== Sports ===
K.R. Mangalam University maintains dedicated indoor and outdoor sports facilities as part of its campus infrastructure, intended to support physical fitness and sportsmanship among students alongside academic development.

Indoor facilities include table tennis, foosball, billiards, a chess room, and carrom. Outdoor facilities include grounds and courts for basketball, cricket, football, tennis, volleyball, and badminton.
