= PDM University =

Private university in Bahadurgarh, Haryana, India

- Former name: PDM Group of Institutions
- Motto: Florentissimae Sub Gloriam Dei
- Motto in English: Flourishing under the glory of God
- Type: Private
- Established: 1995
- Founder: PDMREA
- Affiliations: UGC
- Chancellor: Bimla Singh Prabhu
- President: Chitresh Lather (CEO)
- Vice-Chancellor: R. C. Bhattacharjee
- Location: Bahadurgarh (Delhi NCR), Haryana, 124507, India; 28.687595°N 76.889981°E
- Website: pdm.ac.in

PDM University is a co-educational private university from the state of Haryana, India. The university has its campus in Bahadurgarh, Delhi NCR. The University has been established by the Haryana State Legislature under the Haryana Private Universities Act No. 32 of 2006, as amended by the Haryana Private Universities (Amendment), Act, 2015 (Haryana Act No.1 of 2016) and notified in the Haryana Govt. Gazette (Extra) Notification No. Leg.2/2016, dated 14 January 2016. The University has also been recognised by UGC under section 2(f) of the UGC Act 1956. The University is established and managed by Prabhu Dayal Memorial Religious & Educational Association (PDMREA).

== Campus ==
The university campus is in Sector-3A, Sarai Aurangabad, Bahadurgarh located 7 kilometers (4.3 mi) west of the New Delhi-Haryana (Tikri) border.

== History ==
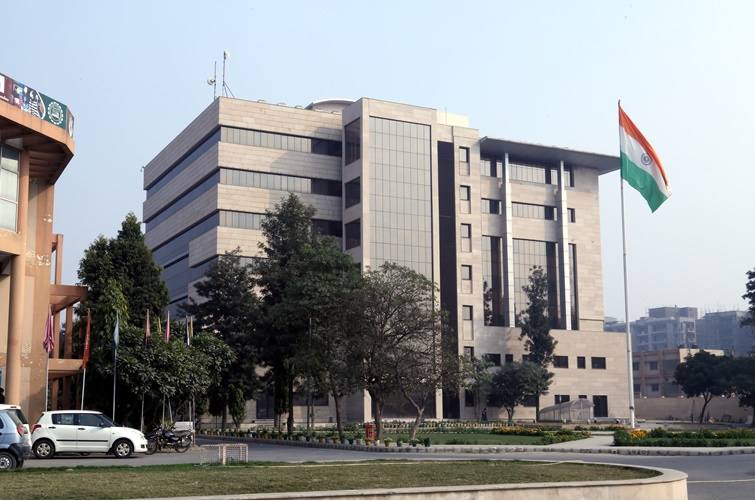
PDM University, Bahadurgarh

Prabhu Dayal Memorial Religious & Educational Association (sponsoring body of the university) was established in 1995. The association commonly referred as PDMREA was established in memory of Late Sh. Prabhu Dayal. The group started its education venture with a diploma college in 1996 with PDM Polytechnic. The association later added PDM College of Engineering in 1999. Since then PDMREA has established and supported a number of educational institutions.

- PDM Polytechnic in 1996
- PDM College of Engineering in 1999
- PDM Public School in 2003
- PDM College of Pharmacy in 2004
- PDM Institute of Engineering & Technology at Karsindhu, Safidon (Jind) in 2005
- PDM College of Education in 2006
- PDM Dental College & Research Institute in 2006
- PDM General Hospital in 2006
- PDM College of Diploma Engineering & Technology, Karsindhu, Safidon (Jind) in 2007
- PDM School of Pharmacy, Karsindhu, Safidon (Distt. Jind) in 2008
- PDM College of Engineering for Women in 2009
- PDM College of Technology & Management in 2011
- PDM School of Architecture & Town Planning in 2014
- PDM Primary School in 2015
- PDM University in 2016

Until 2016, all these educational institutions were collectively known as PDM Group of Institutions. After the establishment of PDM University in 2016, these colleges merged into the university as its constituent faculties.

== Faculties ==
The University has over 120 programs in various discipline of Engineering & Technology, Dental Sciences, Pharmacy, Computer Applications, Physical Sciences, Life Sciences, Agriculture, Commerce and Management Studies.

It includes the following faculties:

- Faculty of Engineering & Technology
- Faculty of Agriculture
- Faculty of Allied Health Sciences
- Faculty of Education
- Faculty of Dental Sciences
- Faculty of Humanities and Social Sciences
- Faculty of Physical Sciences
- Faculty of Law
- Faculty of Life Sciences
- Faculty of Nursing
- Faculty of Commerce & Management Studies
- Faculty of Pharmaceutical Sciences

== Recognition ==
All the educational institutes under PDMREA are approved by the UGC, NCTE, DCI, Govt. of India, Govt. of Haryana and CBSE.

In 2013, PDM was declared as the first Microsoft Ed-Vantage Platinum Campus in Haryana by Microsoft.
