= IILM University Gurugram =

Private university in Haryana, India

IILM University, Gurugram
- Type: Private
- Established: 2018; 5 years ago
- Affiliations: UGC
- Chancellor: P. Dwarakanath
- Vice-Chancellor: Dr. Ravi Kumar Jain (acting)
- Location: Gurgaon, Haryana, India; 28.4334316°N 77.1034226°E
- Website: www.iilm.edu.in

IILM University, Gurugram, or in its full name Institute of Integrated Learning in Management University, Gurugram, is a private university located in Gurgaon, Haryana, India.

It was established on 6 April 2018 under the Haryana Private Universities (Amendment) Act, 2018, after the Bill was approved by the Haryana Legislative Assembly in March 2018. It evolved from the Gurgaon campus of IILM Institute for Higher Education, established 1993.

It is part of the Association of Indian Universities.
