= Indira Gandhi University, Rewari =

State university in Haryana, India

Coordinates: 28.241585°N 76.695974°E

- University Logo
- Motto: Sa Vidya Ya Vimukte
- Type: Public
- Established: 2013; 12 years ago
- Affiliations: UGC
- Chancellor: Governor of Haryana
- Vice-Chancellor: Aseem Miglani
- Location: Meerpur, Rewari, Haryana, India
- Campus: Urban
- Website: www.igu.ac.in

Indira Gandhi University, Rewari (IGU) is a state university located in Village Meerpur, Rewari, Haryana, India.

== History ==
The university began its way as the Post Graduate Regional Centre of Maharishi Dayanand University, established in 1988. It was established under Haryana Act No.29 of 2013 and started functioning on 13 September 2013.

== Campus ==
The university campus is spread over about 100 acres (40 ha) of rural land situated in village Meerpur at a distance of about 13 kilometres (8.1 mi) from Rewari, about 300 kilometres (190 mi) from Chandigarh.

== Colleges ==
Its jurisdiction extends over 2 districts - Mahendragarh and Rewari .

== Faculties ==
The university includes the following faculties:

- Faculty of Art, Aesthetics and design
- Faculty of Humanities
- Faculty of Indic studies
- Faculty of Social Sciences
- Faculty of Physical Sciences
- Faculty of Life Sciences
- Faculty of Education
- Faculty of Law
- Faculty of Commerce, Management, tourism and hospitality
- Faculty of Behavioral and Cognitive Sciences
- Faculty of Engineering & Technology
- Faculty of Earth, Environment & Space Sciences
- Faculty of Pharmaceutical Sciences
- Faculty of Sports Science
