= Central University of Haryana =

Central university in Mahendragarh, Haryana, India

- Other name: CUH
- Motto: "विद्याधनम सर्व धनम प्रधानम"
- Motto in English: "Knowledge is the supreme wealth among all wealths."
- Type: Central University
- Established: 2009; 17 years ago
- Accreditation: NAAC (A)
- Affiliations: UGC, AIU, ACU
- Chancellor: Vacant
- Vice-Chancellor: Vacant
- Visitor: President of India
- Faculty: Faculty 220
- Location: Mahendragarh, Haryana, India; 28°21′4″N 76°8′51″E
- Campus: Rural
- Website: www.cuh.ac.in

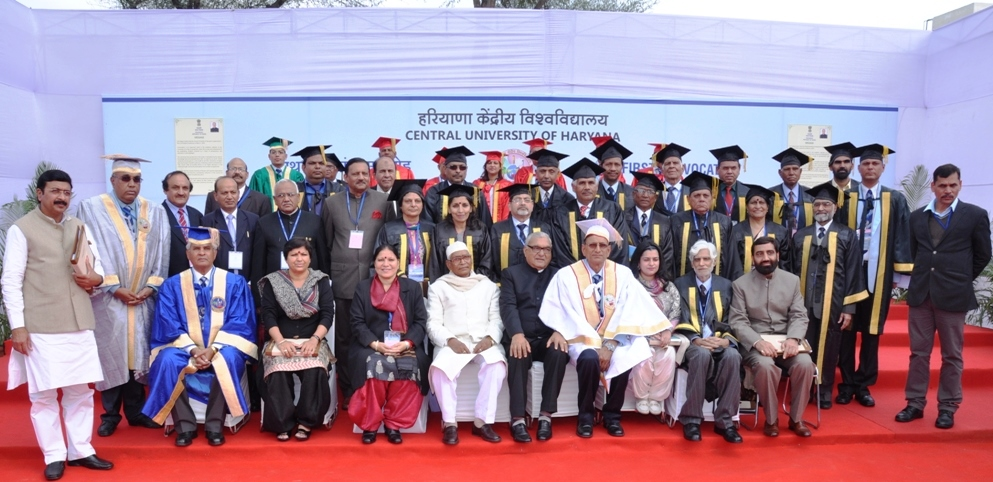
INDIA'S TOP CENTRAL UNIVERSITY OF HARYANA [भारत का केंद्रीय विश्वविद्याल], 2009

Central University of Haryana is a central university in Jaat-Pali villages, just 10 kilometres (6.2 mi) from the City of Mahendragarh and 25 kilometres (16 mi) from Kanina in Mahendragarh district of Haryana, India, has been established by an Act of Parliament: "The Central Universities Act, 2009" by the Government of India. The territorial jurisdiction of Central University of Haryana is for the whole of the Haryana. The first Convocation of the university was held on 1 March 2014. It is one of the 15 Central Universities established by MHRD, GoI.

The university operates from campus in Jant-Pali villages, Mahendragarh district, 10 kilometres (6.2 mi) from the Mahendragarh on the Mahendragarh-Bhiwani road.

In 2024–25, CUH rose to 94th place in the Nature Index, won FICCI’s Emerging University (Government) award, signed ₹196.98 crore infrastructure MoUs, and its students secured national medals and campus placements.

== History ==
A Union University or Central University in India is established by the Department of Higher Education, normally by the Act of Parliament, unlike most universities which are established by state governments. This university was established under 12 more proposed Central Universities in Bihar, Gujarat, Haryana, Himachal Pradesh, Jammu and Kashmir, Jharkhand, Karnataka, Kerala, Odisha, Punjab, Rajasthan and Tamil Nadu in the year 2009 through an Act of Parliament: "The Central Universities Act, 2009" by the Government of India. The Central Universities Bill 2009 aims at creating one new central university each in Bihar, Gujarat, Haryana, Himachal Pradesh, Jammu and Kashmir, Jharkhand, Karnataka, Kerala, Odisha, Punjab, Rajasthan and Tamil Nadu. It also seeks to convert Guru Ghasidas Vishwavidyalaya in Chhattisgarh, Dr. Hari Singh Gour University in Sagar (Madhya Pradesh) and Hemwati Nandan Bahuguna Garhwal University in Uttarakhand into Central universities.

== Campus ==
The Central University of Haryana is located in a rural setting in Jaat-Pali village of Mahendragarh district, Haryana. The permanent campus is spread across more than 484 acres of land, surrounded by the Aravalli hills and near the Sahibi riverbed.

The campus includes:

- Academic blocks and laboratories
- Administrative buildings
- Central library
- Student hostels (separate for boys and girls)
- Guest house and faculty housing
- Sports facilities including gymnasium, and indoor courts
- Health centre, bank, and post office

In 2024–25, the university began a major expansion under its Infrastructure Development Plan:

- In May 2025, CUH signed an MoU worth ₹196.98 crore with NBCC (India) Ltd. for the construction of additional academic blocks, a 630-bed girls' hostel, a multipurpose hall, and other facilities.
- A Miyawaki-style urban forest covering 2.5 acres with over 10,000 native saplings was inaugurated in July 2024 as part of CUH's green initiative.
- A Centre of Excellence in Civil Engineering was established in collaboration with UltraTech Cement in May 2025.

The campus also promotes sustainability through solar panel installations, rainwater harvesting, waste management systems, and green landscaping.

== Organisation and administration ==
=== Governance ===
The President of India is the visitor of the university.

=== Departments ===
There are 8 Schools (35 Departments) in the university under which Graduation, Post Graduate, M.Phil. and Ph.D. courses are offered. The admission are entirely through Central University Common Entrance Test commonly known as CUET. From 2024 onwards, admission to B.Tech programs is based on ranks obtained in the JEE-Main, followed by centralized counselling through JoSSA/CSAB.

School	Departments / Centres
School of Engineering and Technology	Department of Computer Science & Engineering; Department of Civil Engineering; Department of Electrical Engineering; Department of Printing & Packaging Technology; Department of Applied Sciences & Humanities
School of Basic Science	Department of Chemistry; Department of Computer science and Information Technology; Department of Geography; Department of Mathematics; Department of Physics and Astrophysics; Department of Statistics
School of Interdisciplinary and Applied Sciences	Department of Biochemistry; Department of Biotechnology; Department of Microbiology; Department of Nutrition Biology; Department of Pharmaceutical science; Department of Environmental Science; Department of Library and information science; Department of Yoga
School of Humanities and Social Sciences	Department of English and Foreign Languages; Department of Hindi; Department of History and Archaeology; Department of Journalism and Mass Communication; Department of Political Science; Department of Psychology; Department of Sanskrit; Department of Sociology
School of Life-Long Learning	Department of Vocational studies and Skill Development
School of Law, Governance, Public Policy and Management	Department of Law
School of Education	Department of Teacher Education; Department of Physical Education & Sports
School of Business and Management Studies	Department of Management studies; Department of Economics; Department of Commerce; Department of Tourism and Hotel Management

== Rankings and awards ==
Year	Ranking / Award	Agency
2024	94th in Nature Index	Nature Index
2024	3rd (Innovation)	India Today
2024	Emerging University of the Year (Government)	FICCI
2025	15th among Central Universities	IIRF

== Controversy ==
=== Land dispute ===
When the land for the university was leased out by the villagers for a nominal rent, local and state leaders promised that the local villagers will be given priority for admission and jobs. Since then, M.M.Pallam Raju, Union Minister for Human Resource Development, has told the villagers that the Central Universities Act, 2009, does not allow reservations for jobs based on domicile. The people felt cheated and no relief was given to them.

=== RSS leader speech ===
The university came under controversy and criticism when a senior leader of the Rashtriya Swayamsevak Sangh (RSS), Sunil Ambekar, presented a conference on "research methodology" without a research degree and as a chief guest organized by Central University of Haryana. Several scholars have questioned the option and asked if it comes under pressure from the government.

== See also ==
- State University of Performing And Visual Arts
- State Institute of Film and Television
- Central University, India
