= Leonid Kadenyuk =

Ukrainian cosmonaut (1951–2018)

Hero of Ukraine Leonid Kadenyuk
- Леонід Каденюк
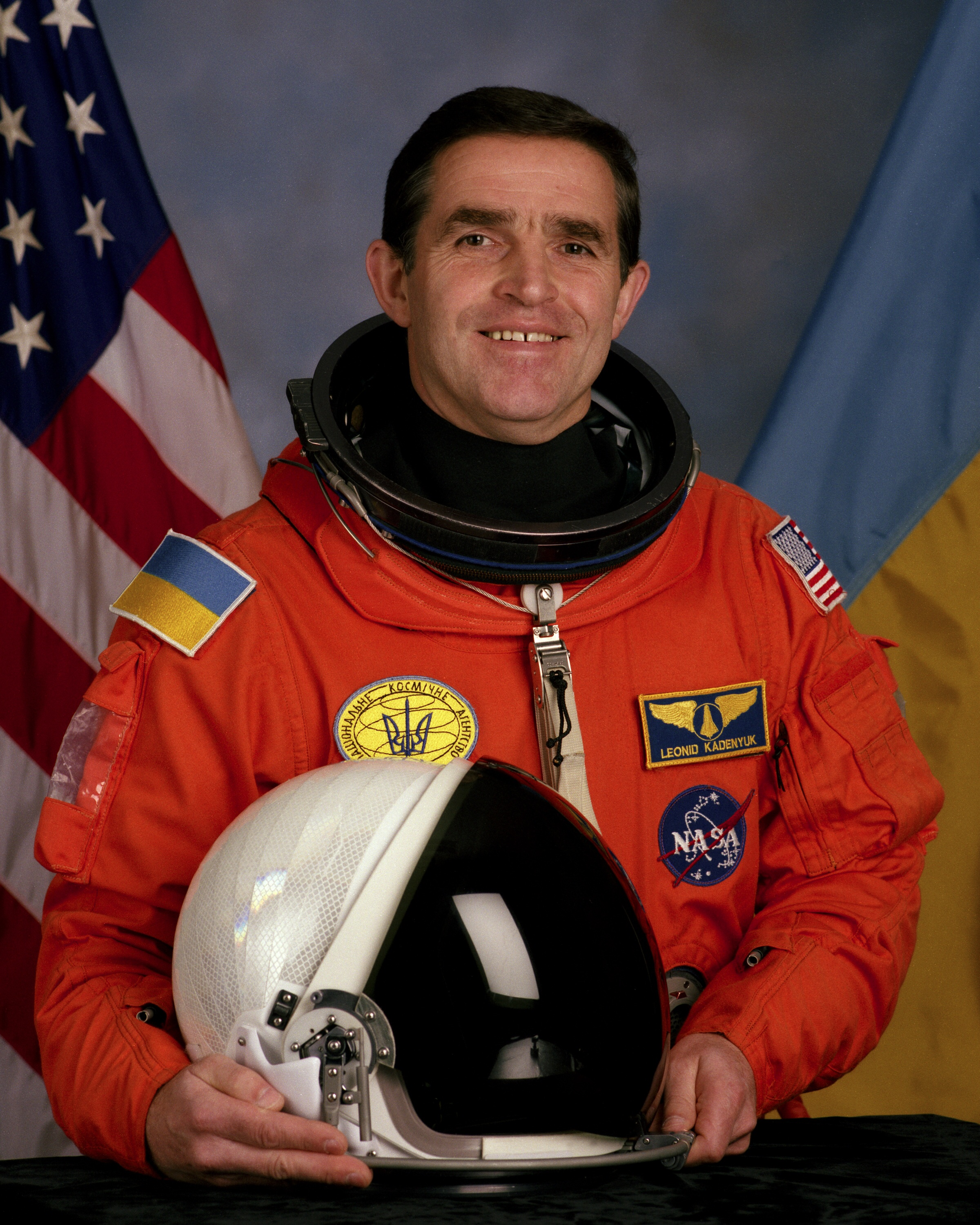
- Born: 28 January 1951; Klishkivtsi, Chernivtsi Oblast, Ukrainian SSR, Soviet Union
- Died: 31 January 2018 (aged 67); Kyiv, Ukraine
- Occupation: Test pilot
- Awards: Hero of Ukraine
- Space career

Soviet / Ukrainian astronaut
- Rank: Major general, UAF
- Time in space: 15d 16h 34 m
- Selection: 1976 Air Force Group 6
- Missions: STS-87

Leonid Kostyantynovych Kadenyuk (Ukrainian: Леонід Костянтинович Каденюк; 28 January 1951 – 31 January 2018) was the first astronaut of independent Ukraine to fly into outer space.

In 1997, he flew on NASA's Space Shuttle Columbia as part of the international mission STS-87.

Kadenyuk held the rank of major general in the Ukrainian Air Force. He was Deputy of Ukraine of the 4th convocation, adviser to the Prime Minister of Ukraine, Chairman of the State Space Agency of Ukraine, and Honorary Doctor of Chernivtsi National University.

From 2015 until his death, he served as president of the Aerospace Society of Ukraine.

Designated a Hero of Ukraine in December 1999, he is the namesake of the Chernivtsi Leonid Kadenyuk International Airport.

== Life ==
=== Early life and education ===
Leonid Kadenyuk was born on 28 January 1951 in the village of Klishkivtsi in the Khotyn Raion of the Chernivtsi Oblast in Ukraine, to a family of rural teachers.

In 1967, he graduated from high school with a silver medal, after which he entered the Chernihiv Higher Military Aviation School of Pilots.

After graduating from the Aviation School in 1971 and receiving a diploma as a pilot-engineer specializing in aircraft pilotry/operations, he worked as a pilot-instructor.

=== USSR pilotry and military service ===
Kadenyuk was a Soviet military pilot. He began his service in the Soviet Air Forces and was selected in 1976 for the Soviet Cosmonaut Corps. In 1977 he graduated from the Test Pilot Training Center. He received a diploma and qualification "test pilot". In 1977–1979, he underwent general space training and qualified as a test astronaut.

Between 1984 and 1988 Kadenyuk was a test pilot of the State Research Institute of the USSR Air Force. In 1989 he graduated from the Moscow Aviation Institute – Faculty of Aircraft. Between 1988 and 1990 he underwent engineering and flight training in the Buran program as commander of the planned Soviet reusable spacecraft. He was removed from a team of test pilots of Buran due to marital issues. He was allowed to rejoin the Cosmonaut Detachment several years later. He took part in working out the glide path of descent for landing the spacecraft Buran using MiG-31 and MiG-25 aircraft.

Between 1990 and 1992, under the full program, he was trained as the commander of the transport ship Soyuz-TM.

=== Post-Ukrainian independence ===
With the break-up of the Soviet Union, Kadenyuk remained in the Russian Space Forces and adopted Ukrainian citizenship. In 1995, during the preparation of the first Ukrainian space mission, he volunteered to take part and returned to his homeland.

In 1995 he was selected to the group of astronauts of the National Space Agency of Ukraine.

Preparing for space flight, from April to October 1996 he worked as a researcher at the Department of Phytohormonology of the Kholodny Institute of Botany of the National Academy of Sciences of Ukraine.

=== 1997 flight with Space Shuttle Columbia ===
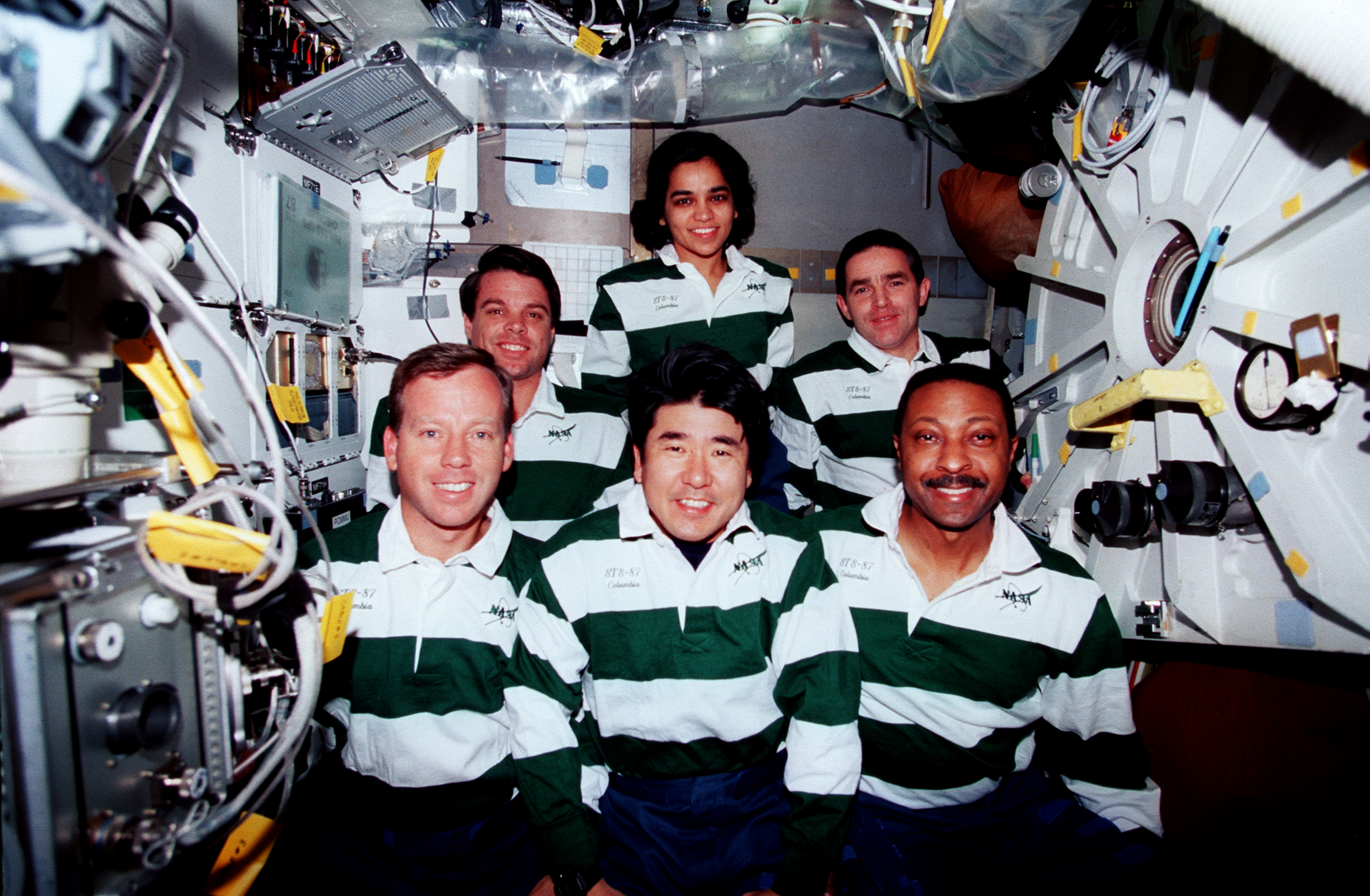
STS-87's in-flight crew portrait, including Steven W. Lindsey; Takao Doi; Winston E. Scott; Kevin R. Kregel; Kalpana Chawla; and Kadenyuk.

He was trained by NASA for a space flight on Space Shuttle Columbia's mission STS-87 as a payload specialist. There were two main candidates for the mission, the other being Yaroslav Pustovyi, a civil Ukrainian scientist in space research. As the more experienced one, Kadenyuk was chosen as the primary candidate for the mission, and Pustovy became Kadenyuk's backup.

During the preparation for space flights and in the process of test work he underwent unique engineering and flight training. He studied the Soyuz, Soyuz-TM, Buran spacecraft, the Salyut orbital station, the Mir orbital complex, and the US Space Shuttle. He was trained to conduct scientific experiments on board spacecraft in various fields: biology, medicine, metrology, ecology, study of natural resources of the Earth from space, geology, astronomy, geobotany.

From 19 November to 5 December 1997, he made a space flight on the American Space Shuttle Columbia, mission STS-87. The 24th flight of Columbia took place with the participation of Leonid Kadenyuk on 19 November 1997, launched from the Kennedy Space Center. In the laboratory module "Spacelab" scientific experiments in the fields of astrobiology, physics and materials science were carried out, astronauts were also scheduled to go into outer space.

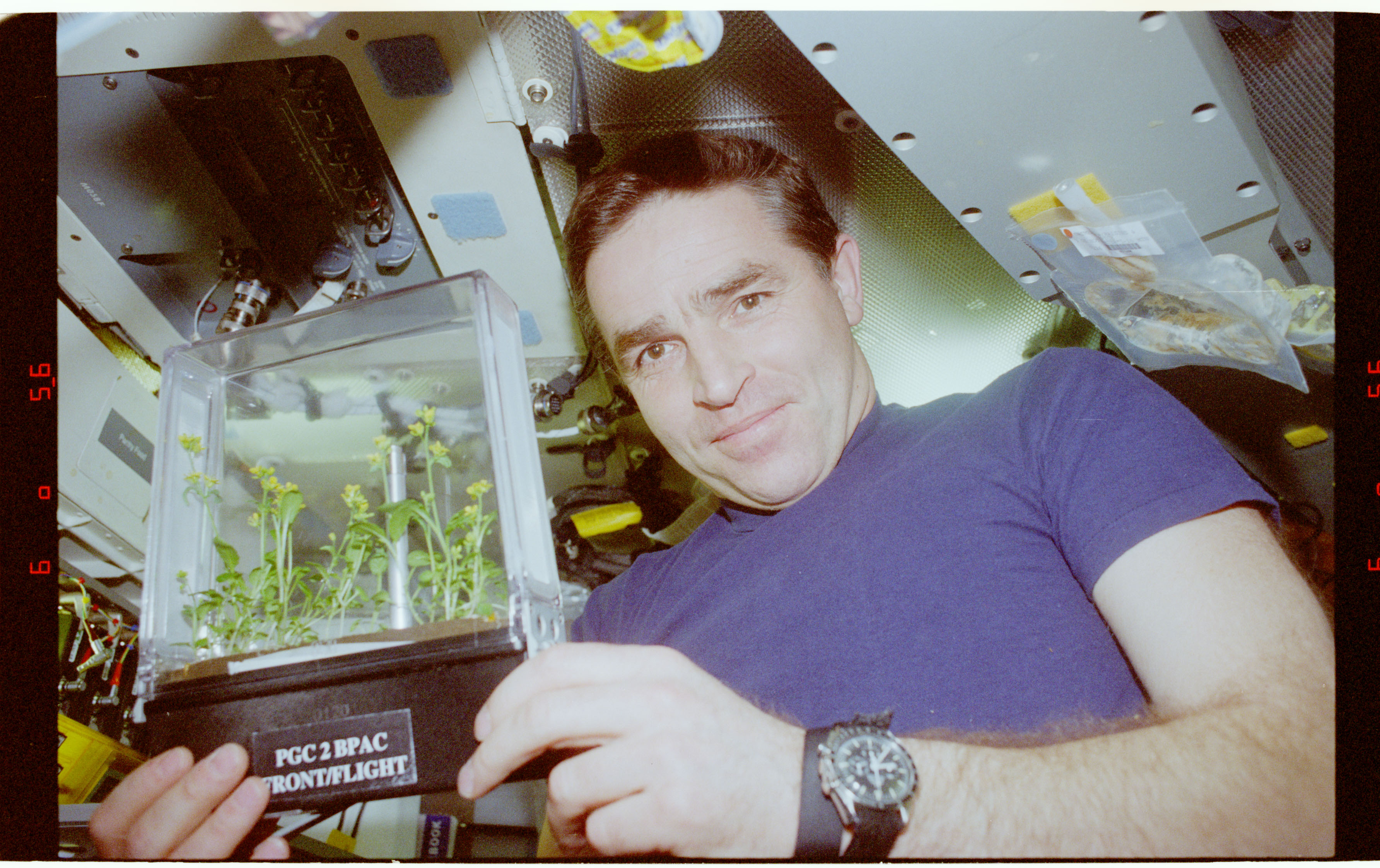
Kadenyuk holds up a Brassica rapa plant growth experiment while aboard the Columbia, January 1998

During his flight with shuttle Columbia, he performed biological experiments of a joint Ukrainian-American scientific study with three species of plants: turnip, soybean and moss. The main purpose of the experiments was to study the effect of weightlessness on the photosynthetic apparatus of plants, on fertilization and embryo development, on gene expression in soybean and turnip tissues, on the content of phytohormones in turnip plants, on hydrocarbon metabolism and ultrastructure of soybean sprout cells.

In addition to these experiments in space flight, experiments were performed by the Institute of Systems Human Research on the topic "Man and the state of weightlessness."

On 27 November, the 9th day of the flight, the first connection with Ukraine was scheduled. For the first time from space, a citizen of Ukraine had a dialogue with his country.

From the astronaut's memoirs: "7 days before the launch, a special regime was introduced for our crew in order to prevent infectious diseases – quarantine. It excludes the possibility of astronauts in public places and any outside contacts. We were also isolated from families. At the same time, the astronauts are not only under the close supervision of doctors, but also under the supervision of psychologists."

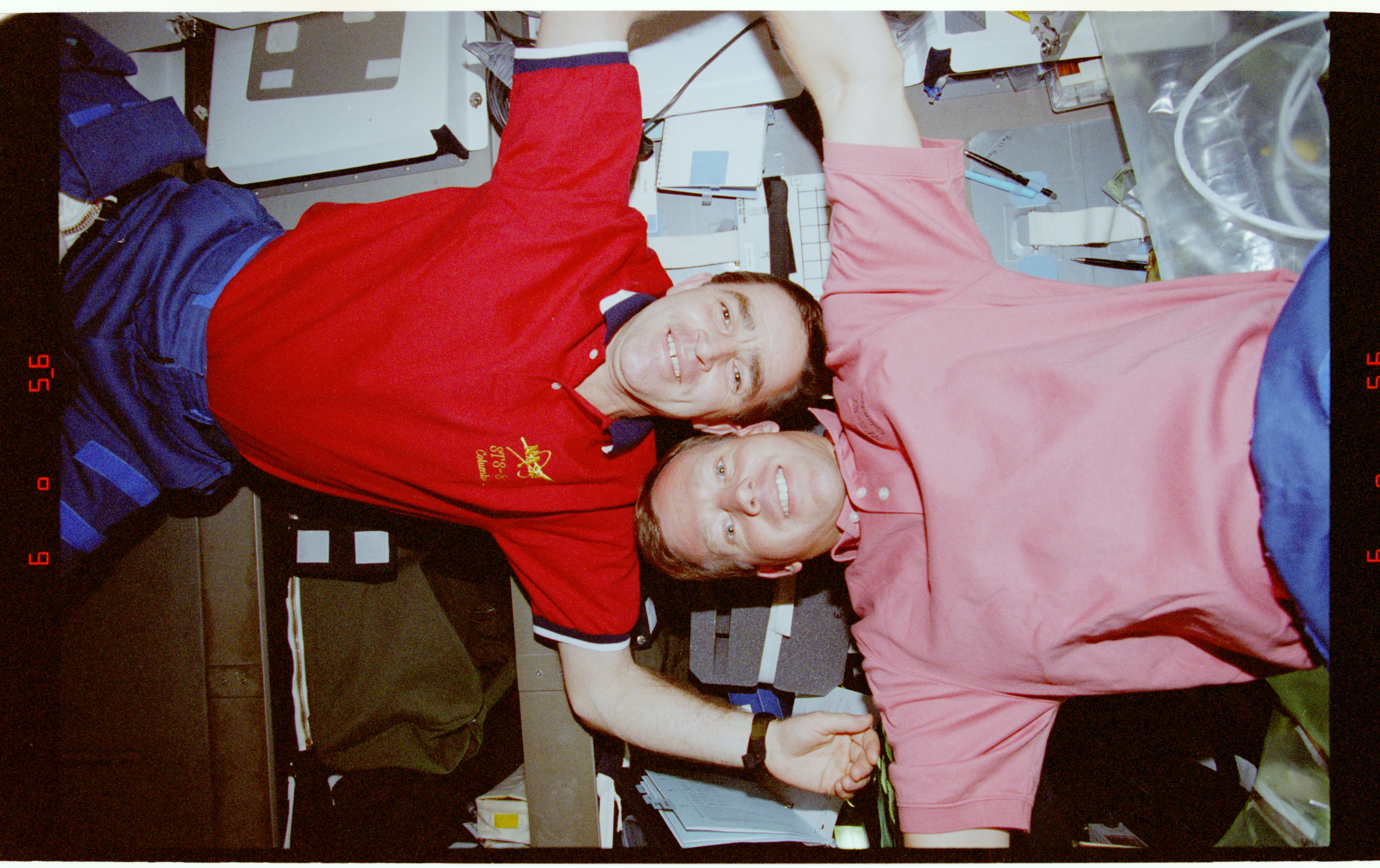
Candid photograph in middeck with American pilot Steve Lindsey, January 1998

Leonid Kostyantynovych recalls: "Every free minute I and my colleagues used to observe and photograph the Earth and space. Such classes were the most popular, and I considered them another impressive and extremely interesting experiment aboard the "Columbia"".

The day in Ukraine begins with the Anthem. Therefore, Leonid Kostyantynovych ordered it to signal the awakening of the crew, which was broadcast from the Flight Control Center on board the "Columbia". Each member of the crew chose a melody to their liking. Thus, the anthem of our state twice sounded in space over the entire planet.

=== Later pilot career ===
After the flight, Leonid Kadenyuk continued his Ukrainian space program career at the State Space Agency of Ukraine.

He participated in the development and testing of aerospace systems, in their sketch and layout design, as well as in-flight tests of systems.

He flew more than 50 types and modifications of aircraft for various purposes, mainly on fighters, as well as on the American training aircraft Northrop T-38.

Kadenyuk was appointed Major general of the Armed Forces of Ukraine in 1998 and became Deputy Inspector General of the General Military Inspectorate under the President of Ukraine for Aviation and Cosmonautics.

=== Political career ===
In the 2002 parliamentary election, he was elected to the Verkhovna Rada in the list of pro-Kuchma United Ukraine Bloc. Later, Kadenyuk joined the "Trudova Ukrayina – Industrialists and Entrepreneurs" faction, but had not been politically active. He worked within parliament's Committee on Defense and National Security.

In the 2006 parliamentary election, Kadenyuk was No. 3 in the electoral party list of Lytvyn's People's Bloc, but the block won only 2.44% of the popular vote (short of the required 3%) and no seats in the parliament.

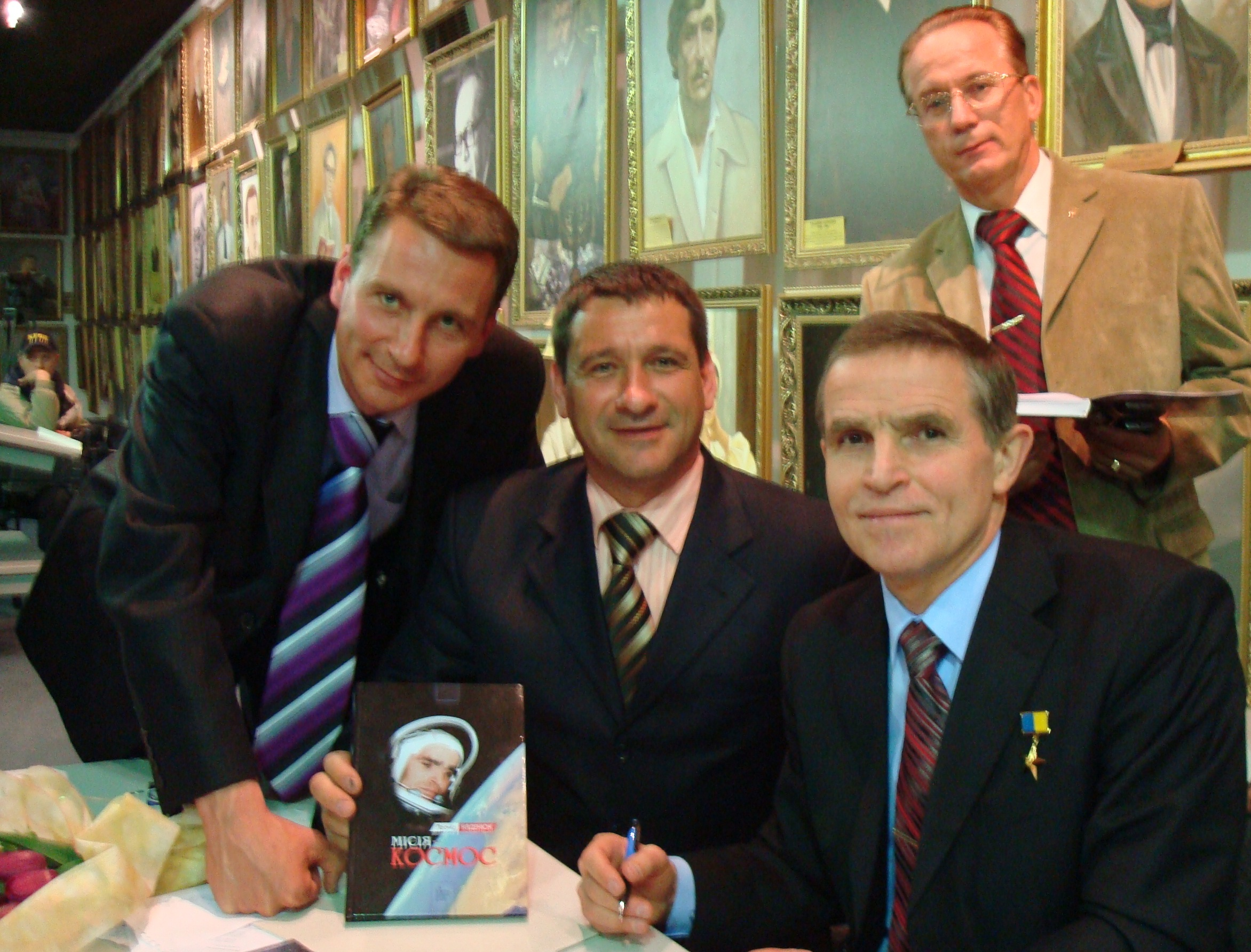
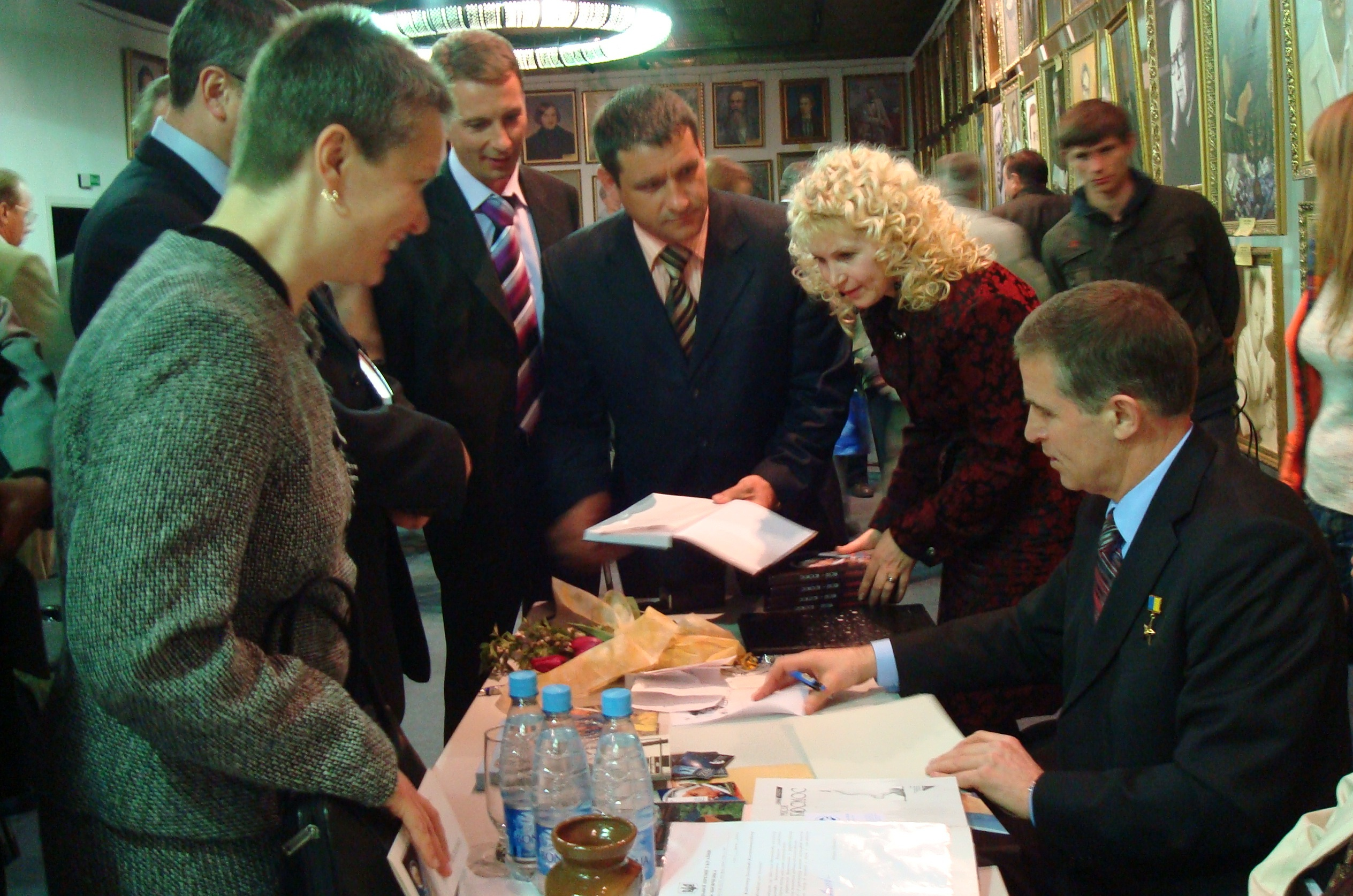
Leonid Kadenyuk signs his book, Mission – Space, at the Ukrainian House Convention Center in Kyiv, 2008.

=== Writings ===
Kadenyuk is the author of 5 scientific papers. The book "Mission – Space", published in 2009 by Pulsary Publishing House, won first place in the Book of the Year 2009 competition in the Horizons category. The book was republished in 2017 by Novy Druk Publishing House.

== Awards and honors ==
Award of the President of Ukraine "Hero of Ukraine" with the award of the Order "Golden Star" – for services to the Ukrainian state in the development of astronautics, outstanding personal contribution to strengthening international cooperation in space.

On 19 January 1998, Kadenyuk received the Order "For Courage" I degree of the Distinction of the President of Ukraine for outstanding contribution to the international prestige of the national space industry and personal courage and heroism shown during the Ukrainian-American scientific research aboard the Space Shuttle Columbia.

Order "For Merits" III st. – for significant personal contribution to the development of the rocket and space industry, significant achievements in the creation and implementation of space systems and technologies, high professionalism (12 April 2011)

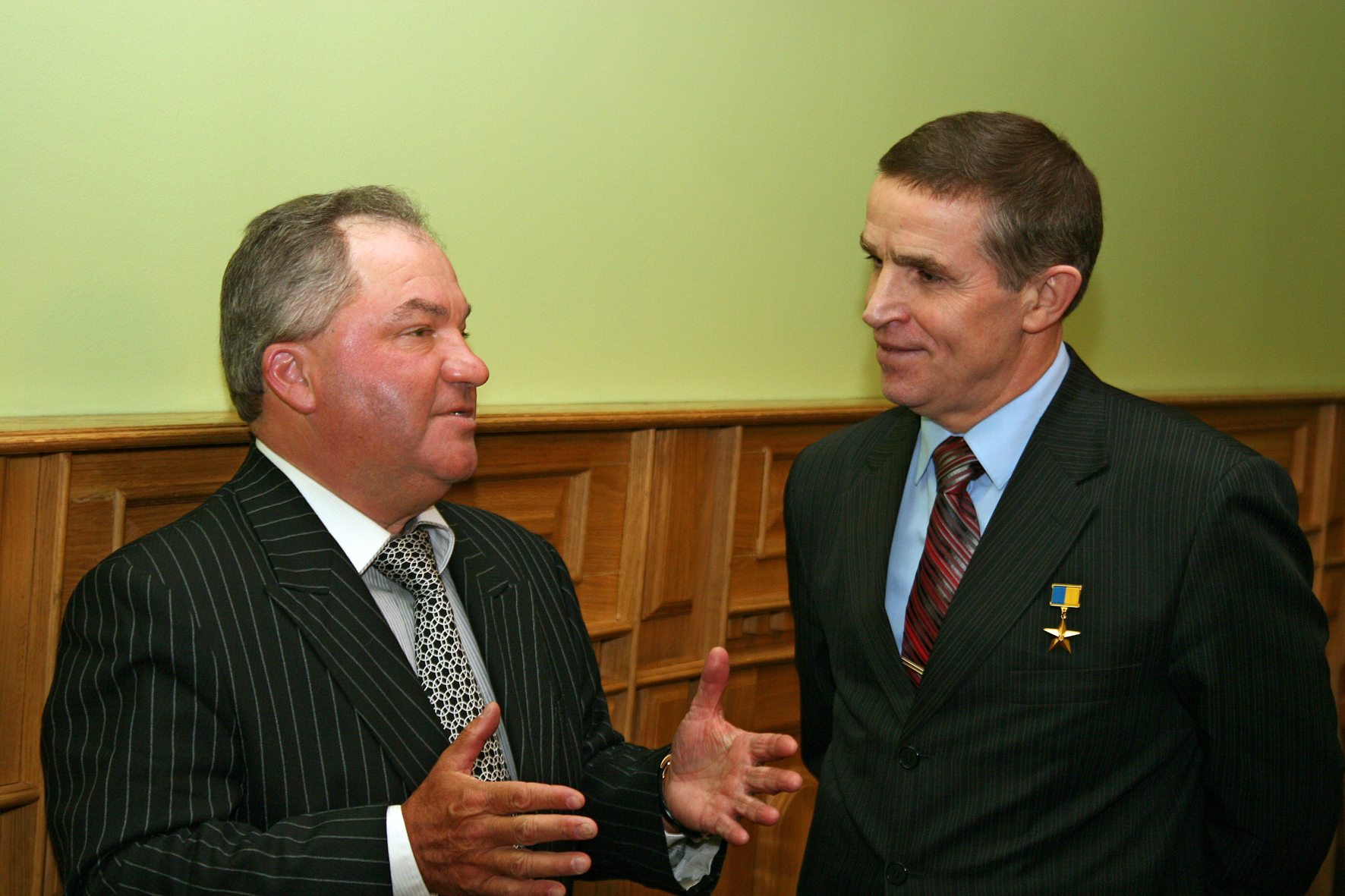
Politician Rostyslav Talsky of the Kyiv Bukovina Society congratulating Kadenyuk as a Hero of Ukraine, 2009

In 2004, astronomers at Andrushivka Astronomical Observatory named Asteroid 399673 Kadenyuk in his honor. The official naming citation was published by the Minor Planet Center on 5 October 2017 (M.P.C. 106504).

== Death and legacy ==
Kadenyuk died on 31 January 2018 from a heart attack during his morning run in a park in Kyiv. He was interred in the central avenue of Kyiv's Baikove Cemetery.

On 2 February 2018, the farewell ceremony occurred in Kyiv in the Club of Cabinet of Ministers of Ukraine building.

In September of the same year, the Chernivtsi Leonid Kadenyuk International Airport was named for Kadenyuk.

On 4 April 2020, sculptor Valentyn Znoba created a bas-relief portrait of Kadenyuk for the National Technical University of Ukraine. The bust has been treated as a memorial, as staff and students leave flowers there on 28 January, Kadenyuk's birthday.

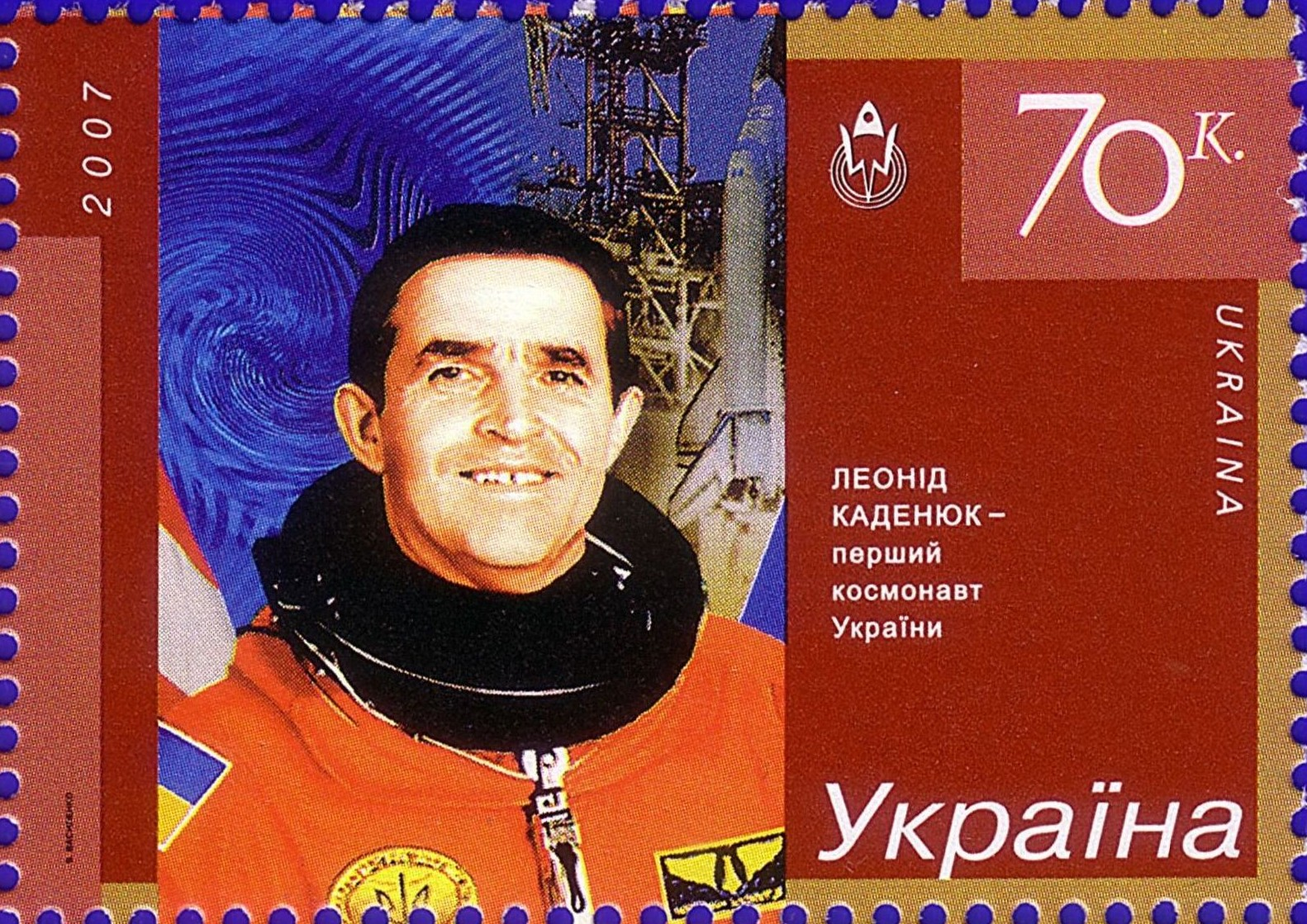
2007 Ukrainian postage stamp reading "L. Kadenyuk - the first cosmonaut of Ukraine".

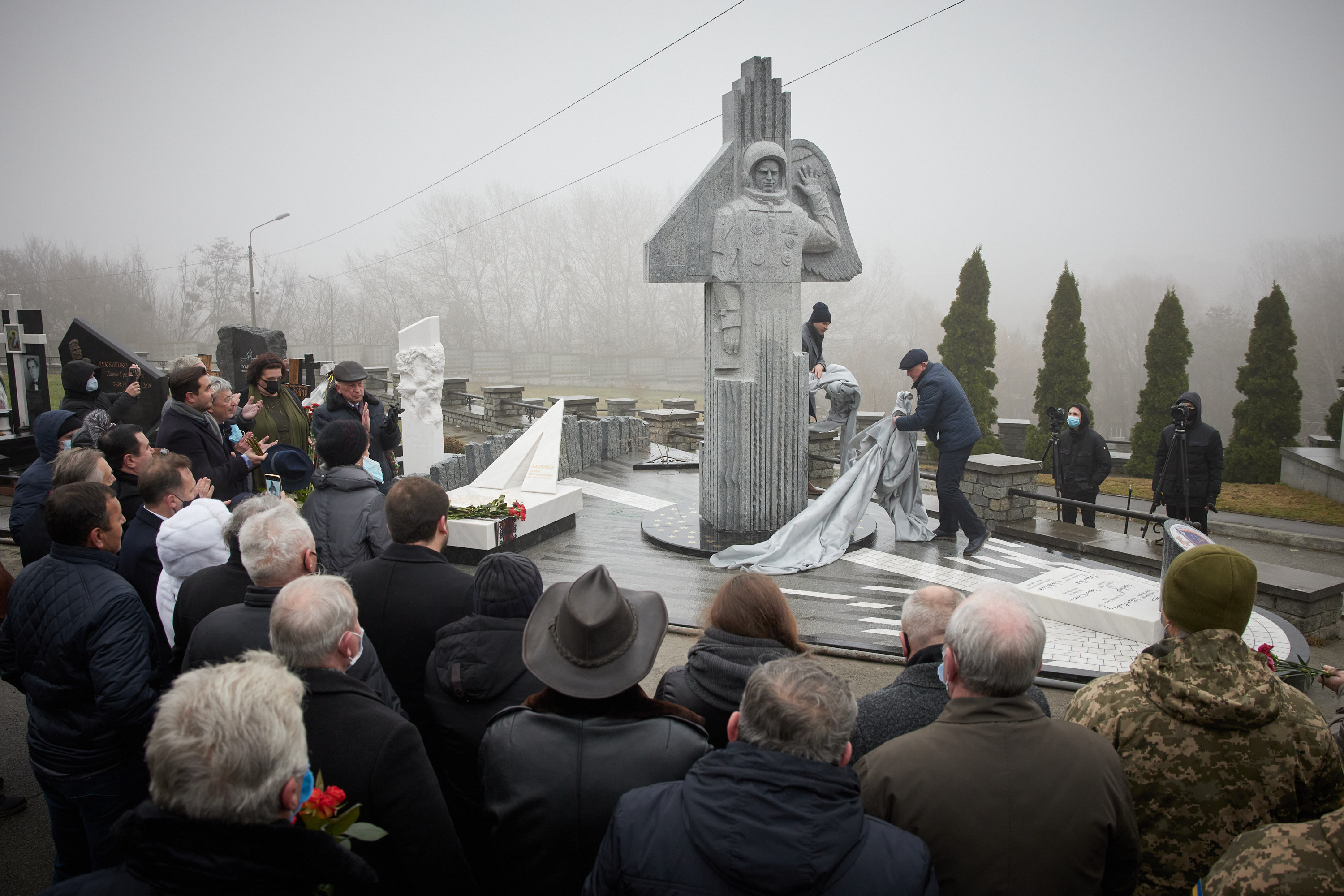
2020 monument to Kadenyuk at Baikove Cemetery. It was unveiled on 5 December, the 23rd anniversary of his return from STS-87.

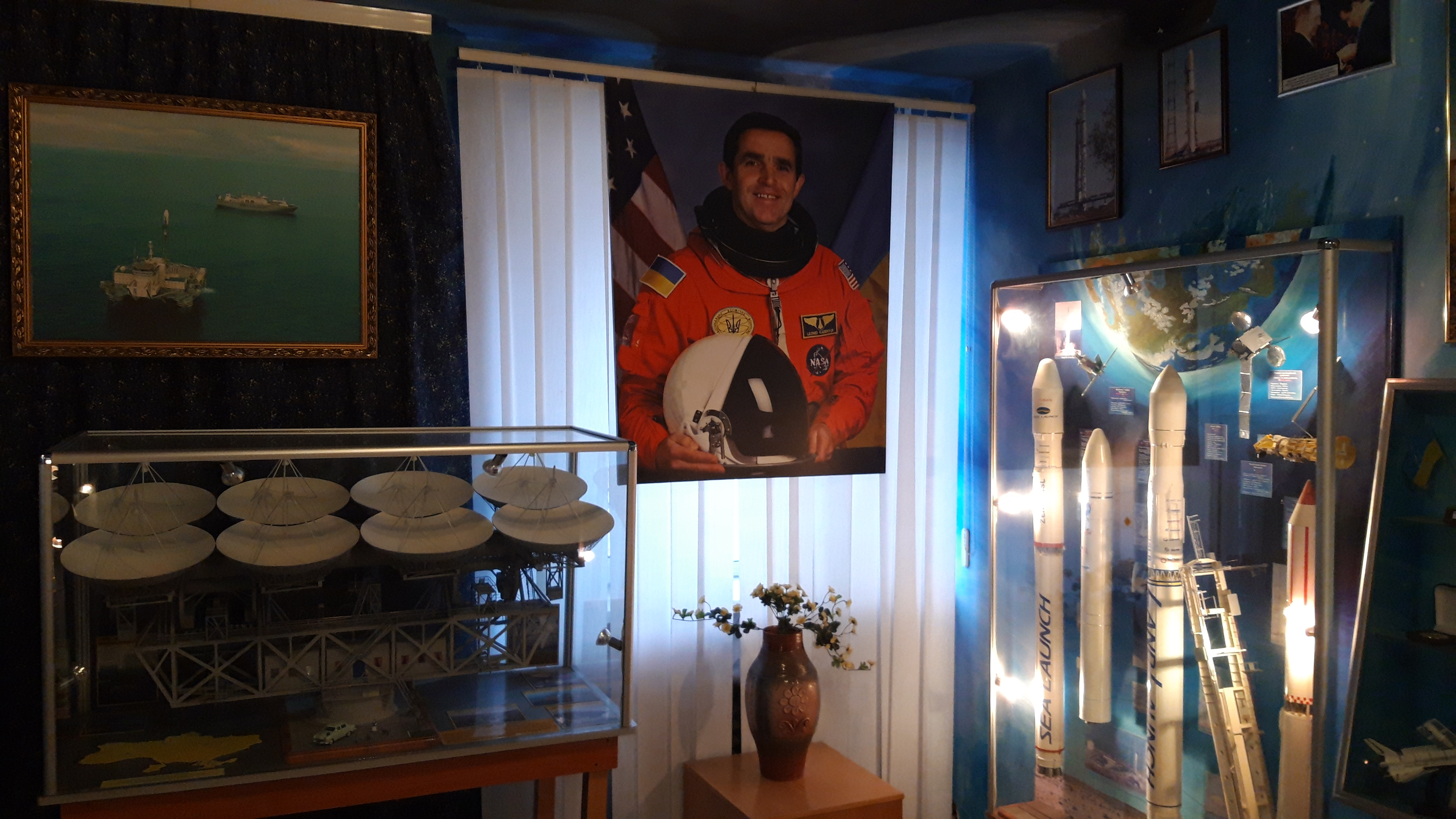
A room dedicated to Kadenyuk in the Chernivtsi Air and Space Museum

== See also ==
- Soviet space program
- State Space Agency of Ukraine
