= Kleynod =

Ukrainian watch brand

- Type: Private
- Industry: Watchmaking
- Founded: November 1997
- Founder: Alexei Zolotarev
- Headquarters: Kyiv, Ukraine
- Area served: Ukraine, France, Syria, United Arab Emirates, Central Asia, United States
- Products: Watches
- Owner: Kyiv Watch Factory (KHZ)
- Website: https://kleynodwatches.com/

Kleynod is a Ukrainian watch brand owned by the Kyiv Watch Factory (KHZ) in Kyiv, Ukraine.

Leonid Kadeniuk made his first space flight with a KHZ watch (Note: A custom watch was made by KHZ for Leonid Kadeniuk, but it is unclear if he wore it to space on STS-87.) on STS-87 aboard Columbia; this was the first Ukrainian flight to the stars during the period of Ukraine's independence following the dissolution of the Soviet Union in 1991.

== History ==
The Kyiv Watch Factory was founded by Alexei Zolotarev in November 1997.

The first Kleynod watch was released when, in October 2002, the company received the first corporate order for its products. The first outlet opened in TsUM Kyiv ('Central universal department store Kyiv') at the end of 2002. And in February 2003 there is a serial start of production. In August 2004, a distributor company, Newton Trading Company, was founded.

In July 2006, a limited series of watches Kleinody Nezalezhnosti was released. In 2007, the factory's production capacity was capable of producing 7,000 watches per month, the actual production volume was 4,000 hours/month. Since 2007, the brand enters foreign markets: France, Syria, UAE, Central Asia. As of October, the total number of watches manufactured under the Kleynod brand exceeded 100,000 units.

In 2012, Kleynod released a Euro 2012 collection in honor of the event being co-hosted by Ukraine that year.

In 2016, Kleynod watches were presented at the exhibition of promising goods of Ukraine at the Ukrainian-Canadian Business Forum in Toronto.

== Gallery ==
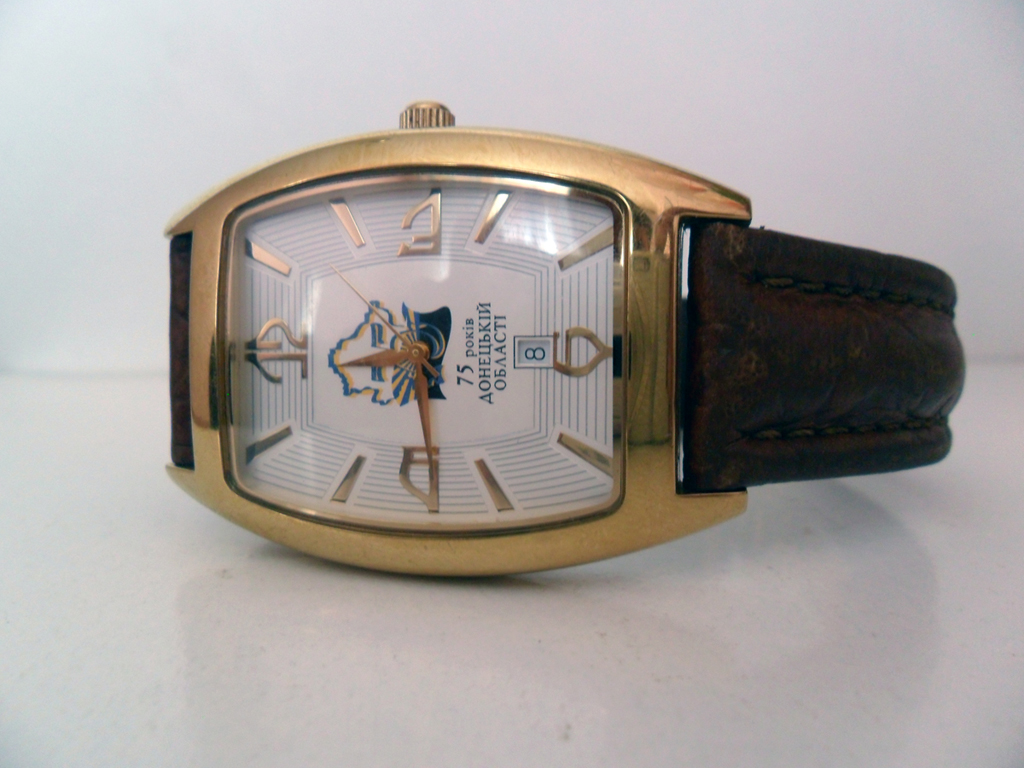
KLEYNOD-01 watch

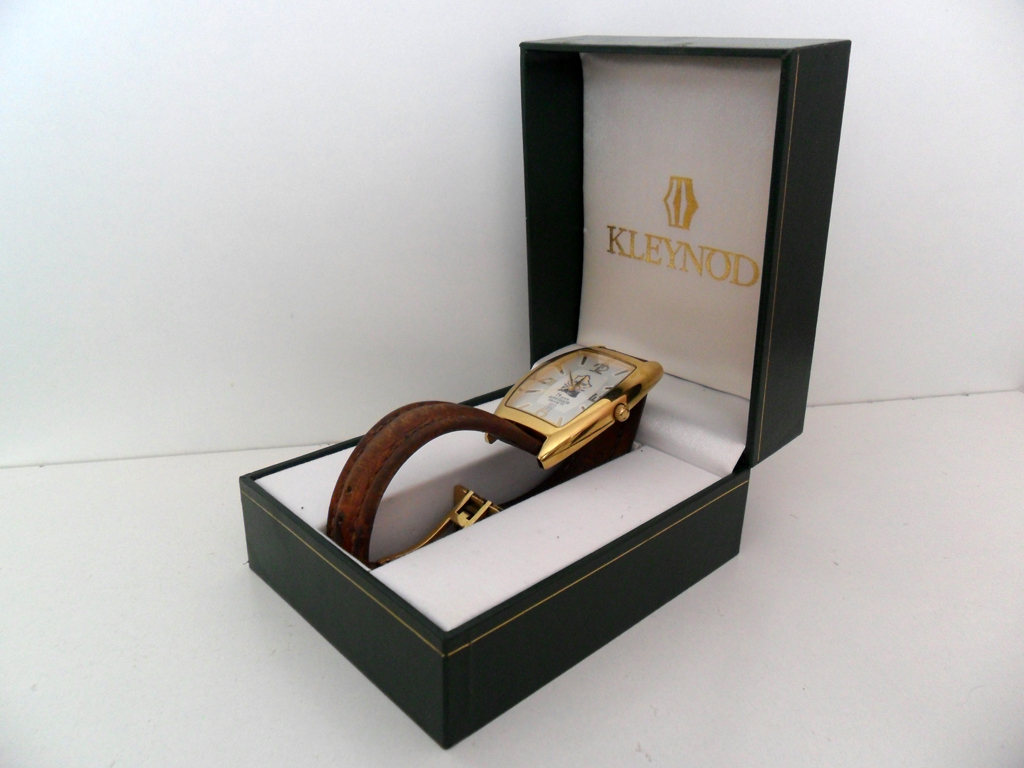
KLEYNOD-03 watch

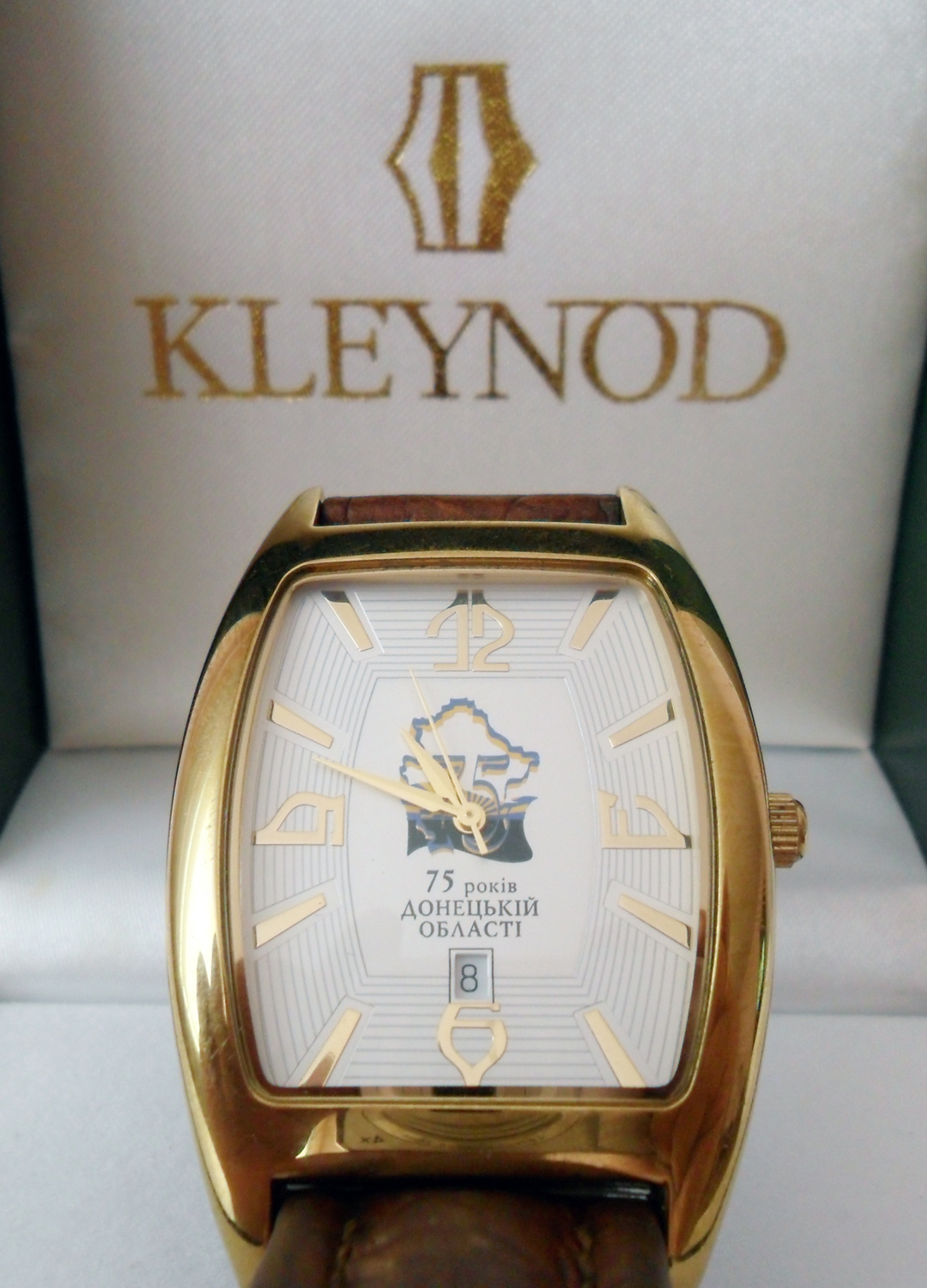
KLEYNOD-04 watch
