= N36 =

N36 may refer to:

- N36 (Long Island bus), a former bus route in Nassau County
- Aeroflot Flight N-36, which crashed in 1976
- HMS Perseus (N36), a submarine of the Royal Navy
- N36 motorway (Netherlands)
- N36 road (Belgium)
- Nebraska Highway 36, in the United States
- Negeri Sembilan State Route N36, now Malaysia Federal Route 3265
- Wotje Airport on Wotje Atoll, Marshall Islands
