= Flight 36 =

Flight 36 may refer to:

- Aeroflot Flight 36 (1960), crashed on 17 August 1960
- Aeroflot Flight 36 (1976), crashed on 17 December 1976
