= Air and Space Museum =

Air and Space Museum may refer to:

== Europe ==
=== France ===
- Musée de l’air et de l’espace, in Le Bourget, Paris

=== Ukraine ===
- Chernivtsi Air and Space Museum

== North America ==
=== Canada ===
- Canadian Air and Space Museum, in Downsview, Toronto, Canada

=== United States ===
- Pima Air & Space Museum, in Tucson, Arizona
- Jimmy Doolittle Air & Space Museum, within Travis Air Force Base in Fairfield, California
- San Diego Air & Space Museum, in California
- Peterson Air and Space Museum, within Peterson Air Force Base, near Colorado Springs, Colorado
- Wings Over the Rockies Air and Space Museum, on the former grounds of Lowry Air Force Base in Denver, Colorado
- Greater Saint Louis Air & Space Museum, at St. Louis Downtown Airport, Cahokia, Illinois
- Intrepid Sea, Air & Space Museum, in New York City, N.Y., U.S.
- International Women's Air & Space Museum, in Cleveland, Ohio
- Armstrong Air and Space Museum, in Wapakoneta, Ohio
- Stafford Air & Space Museum, in Weatherford, Oklahoma
- Tulsa Air and Space Museum & Planetarium, in Oklahoma
- Oregon Air and Space Museum, in Eugene, Oregon
- Strategic Air and Space Museum, near Ashland, Nebraska
- South Dakota Air and Space Museum, in Box Elder, South Dakota
- Virginia Air and Space Center, a museum and educational facility in Hampton, Virginia, U.S.
- National Air and Space Museum, of the Smithsonian Institution in Washington, D.C., plus its annex at Washington Dulles International Airport

== See also ==
- Aviation museum
- List of aerospace museums
