= Bukovyna Airlines =

Ukrainian charter airline

IATA	ICAO	Call sign
BQ	BKV	BUKOVYNA
- Founded: 1999; 27 years ago
- Ceased operations: February 2021; 5 years ago
- Hubs: Chernivtsi International Airport
- Fleet size: 1
- Destinations: charter
- Headquarters: Chernivtsi, Ukraine
- Website: bkvairlines.com

Bukovyna Airlines, also known as Bukovyna Aviation Enterprise, was a Ukrainian charter airline based in Chernivtsi, which operated chartered passenger flights out of Chernivtsi International Airport.

== History ==
The company was founded in 1999.

In 2013, Bukovyna was one of two Ukrainian airlines that had sanctions imposed against them by the Government of the United States. Bukovyna Airlines was hit with sanctions because it was leasing its US-built McDonnell Douglas MD-80 series aircraft to Iranian airlines Mahan Air and Iran Air. The Iranian airlines were themselves under sanction by the US government.

In February 2021, the Ukrainian authorities revoked the airline's operational license, shutting all operations down.

== Fleet ==
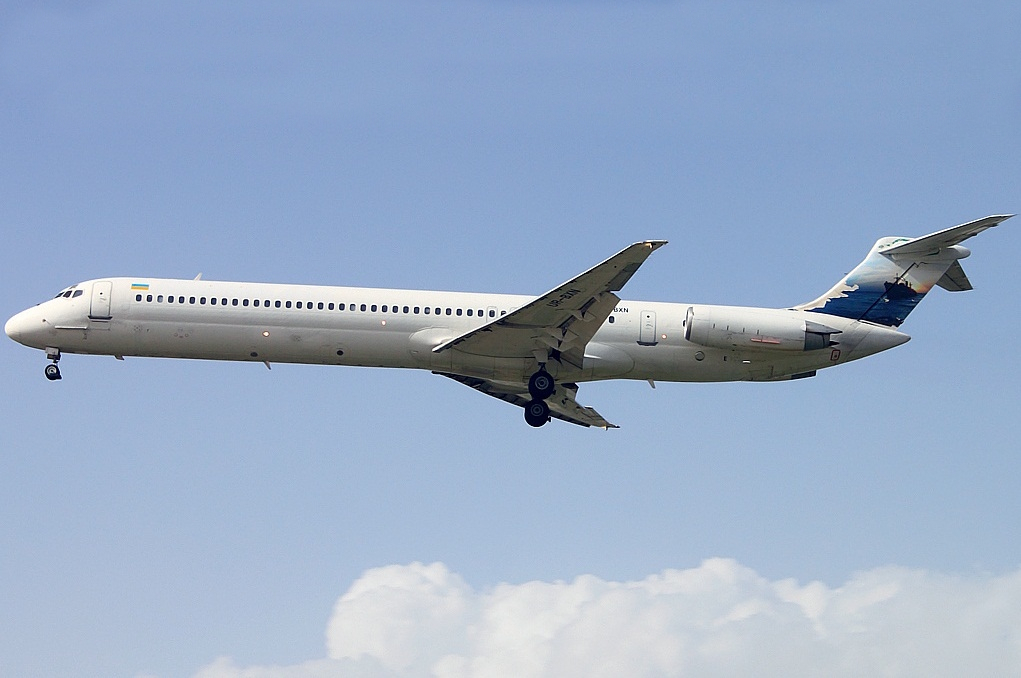
Bukovyna Airlines McDonnell Douglas MD-83

=== Current fleet ===
The Bukovyna Airlines fleet consisted of the following aircraft as of September 2020:

Bukovyna Airlines fleet
Aircraft	Total
McDonnell Douglas MD-82	1
Total	1

=== Previously operated ===
- Boeing 737-500
- British Aerospace BAe 146-300
- Fokker 100
- McDonnell Douglas MD-83
- McDonnell Douglas MD-88
