= Yaroslav Pustovyi =

- Ярослав Пустовий
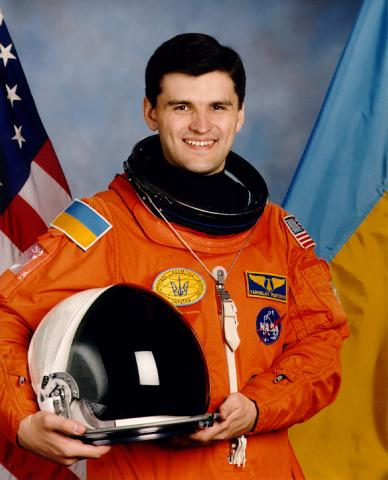
- Pustovyi in 1997
- Born: December 29, 1970 (age 55); Kostroma, Russia
- Awards: Order of Merit (Ukraine)
- Space career
- Previous occupation: Electromagnetism researcher
- Rank: First lieutenant, Ukrainian Air Force

Yaroslav "Yarko" Pustovyi (Ukrainian: Пустовий Ярослав Ігорович; born 29 December 1970) is a former Ukrainian astronaut and Canadian businessman.

Pustovyi was one of the first astronauts selected by the State Space Agency of Ukraine in 1996. Although he was a backup payload specialist on the 1997 NASA space mission STS-87, he did not fly on the mission. Pustovyi was awarded the Order of Merit for Ukraine in 1998 and competed for the Ansari X Prize in 2003 on the Canadian Arrow team.

== Early life and education ==
On 29 December 1970, Pustovyi was born in Kostroma, Russia and grew up in Kyiv, Ukraine. For his post-secondary education, he graduated from the A.F. Mozhaysky Military-Space Academy in 1993 with a Master of Science. Specializing in radio science, Pustovyi additionally earned a Doctor of Philosophy from the National University of Kharkiv in 1997.

== Career ==
Pustovyi started his career as a first lieutenant in the Ukrainian Air Force during the 1990s. While attending university at Kharkiv, he worked at the National Academy of Sciences of Ukraine as an electromagnetism researcher. In 1996, he was selected as one of the first astronauts by the State Space Agency of Ukraine. The following year, he was a part of STS-87 as a backup payload specialist for NASA but did not fly on the shuttle mission.

Outside of Ukraine, he was a member of the Canadian Arrow team that competed for the Ansari X Prize in 2003. With his family, Pustovyi moved to Barrie, Ontario in 2007 and worked in security. A couple of years later, he became a co-founder of Space 1 Systems in 2009. In 2014, Pustovyi joined the Canadian Space Commerce Association as a board member and later became the organization's president that year.

== Awards ==
In January 1998, he was given the Ukrainian Order of Merit of third degree.

== Personal life ==
In October 2011, the Pustovyi family received Canadian permanent residency and permanently settled in Simcoe County. Pustovyi is married to Olesia Pustova and has three children, Anastasiia, Oksana and Amélie, all of whom grew up in Canada. Pustovyi is fluent in Ukrainian, Russian, English, and French.
