= Chernivtsi International Airport =

Airport in Chernivtsi, Ukraine

Chernivtsi Leonid Kadeniuk International Airport Міжнародний аеропорт «Чернівці» імені Леоніда Каденюка
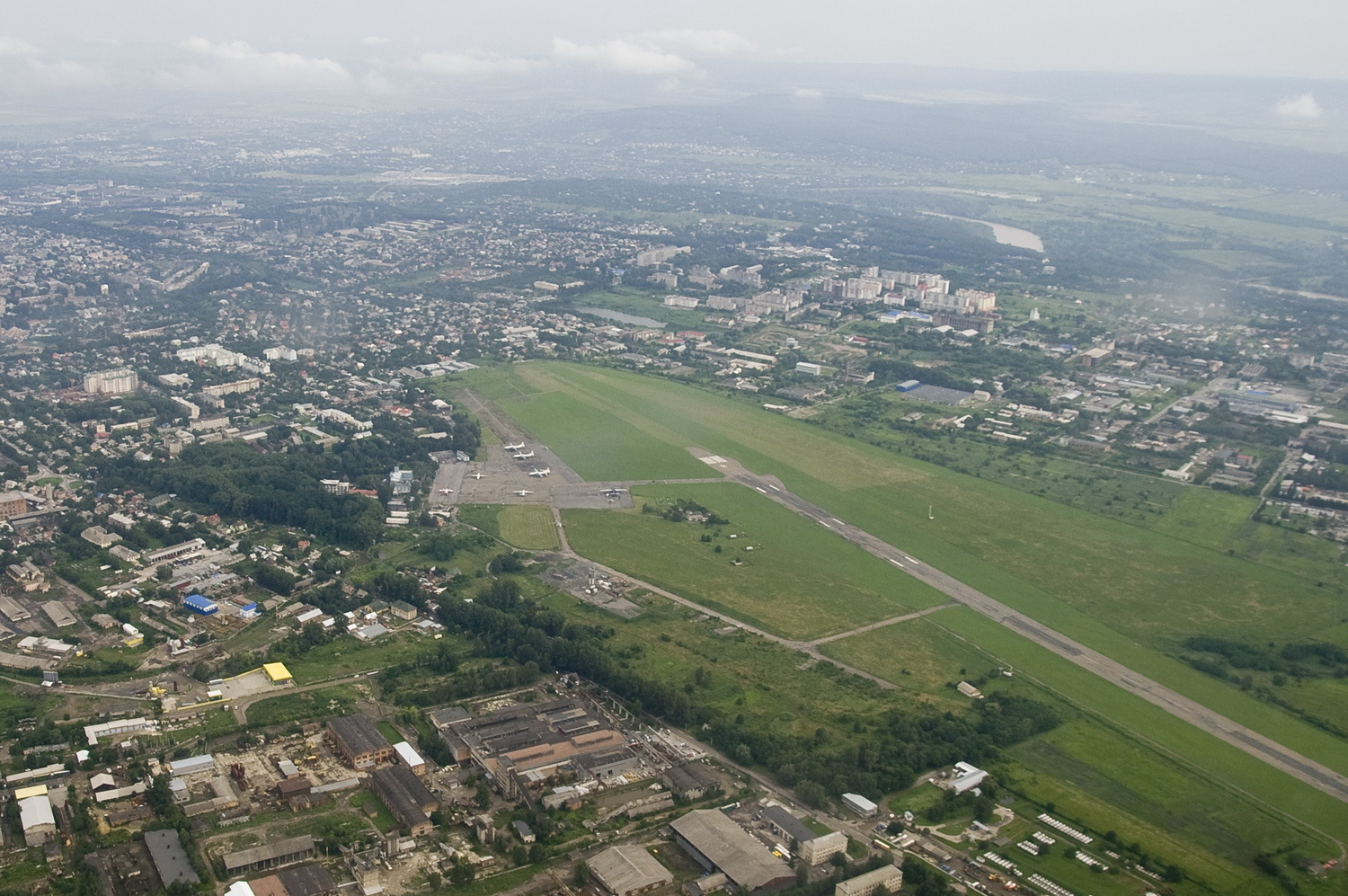
- IATA: CWC; ICAO: UKLN

Summary
- Airport type: Public
- Serves: Chernivtsi
- Location: Chernivtsi, Chernivtsi Oblast, Ukraine
- Elevation AMSL: 797 ft / 243 m
- Coordinates: 48°15′32″N 25°58′52″E
- Website: airportchernivtsi.cv.ua

Maps
- Location of airport in Ukraine
- Interactive map of Chernivtsi Leonid Kadeniuk International Airport

Runways
Direction	Length		Surface
Direction	m	ft	Surface
15/33	2,200	7,218	Asphalt

Statistics (2018)
- Passengers: ▲73,100

Chernivtsi Leonid Kadeniuk International Airport (Ukrainian: Міжнародний аеропорт «Чернівці» імені Леоніда Каденюка) (IATA: CWC, ICAO: UKLN) is an airport in the city of Chernivtsi in western Ukraine.

== History ==
=== Early history ===
First scheduled flights in Chernivtsi commenced in 1928, on the route Bucharest – Iași – Cernăuți (as it was the name of the city in the interwar period, when it was part of the Kingdom of Romania). The flights were operated by SNNA (Serviciul Național de Navigație Aeriană, in 1930 renamed LARES - Romanian Air Lines Exploited by the State) using Farman F.168Bn4 aircraft. In 1929, SNNA (using Avia BH-25J) flew the 585 km (364 mi) long air service Bucharest – Galați – Iași – Cernăuți, followed in 1930 by Galați – Cernăuți route. On 1 November 1931, LARES opened an air service on the Bucharest - Galați – Chișinău – Cernăuți route, with a length of 676 km (420 mi) and served by Junkers F.13 aircraft.

The current airport was designed at the beginning of the 1930s, and inaugurated on 24 May 1933. The terminal building was designed by the Romanian architect Constantin Dragu.

An international route opened on 28 March 1937, when PLL LOT and LARES starting the operation of an air service between Palestine and Poland: Lydda – Rhodos – Athens – Thessaloniki – Sofia – Bucharest – Cernăuți – Lwow – Warsaw. Both airline companies operated their Lockheed L-10A Electra on this service, later supplemented by the Savoia-Marchetti SM.83. On 15 June 1938, the domestic route Cernăuți – Cluj – Arad was launched (operated with Lockheed Electra, Savoia-Marchetti S.73 and later Douglas B-23 Dragon aircraft).

=== Recent years ===
Since 1992, it has been guarded by the Chernivtsi Border Detachment.

In 2016, scheduled operations were resumed by national carrier Ukraine International Airlines. The carrier inaugurated a route linking its hub in Kyiv-Boryspil with Chernivitsi on 12 July, initially operated on a daily basis with flights carried out by partner airline Dniproavia using their Embraer 145 fleet. In the end of 2017, UIA started using Embraer 190s.

At the end of 2017, the Ukrainian airline Yanair arrived at the airport with an audit. On 12 December, a major press conference was held at the City Council building, at which the company management announced that they were absolutely satisfied with the state of the airport and ready to continue cooperation with the airport. There was only one problem - the existing runway can not accept large aircraft. However, among the most promising destinations for scheduled and charter flights, Yanair sees Italy, Egypt, Finland, Georgia, Germany and Israel.

In 2017, the airport management began negotiations with Romanian low-cost carrier Blue Air. There are Boeing 737-500 aircraft in the airline fleet, which the airport can accept without restrictions in weight. There are ongoing negotiations between the airline and the airport.

In July 2018, the airport received a request from Wizz Air, but due to the bad state of the runway, they were unable to start flights to the airport.

In September 2018, the airport was named after Ukrainian astronaut Leonid Kadeniuk.

== Airlines and destinations ==
The following airlines operate regular scheduled and charter flights at the airport:

Currently, all flights are suspended due to the 2022 Russian invasion of Ukraine.

Airlines	Destinations
Windrose Airlines	Kyiv–Boryspil

== Statistics ==
Annual passenger statistics
Year	Total passengers	Change from previous year
2010	56,600	
2011	27,000	▼52.0%
2012	27,300	▲1.1%
2013	16,000	▼41.3%
2016	12,673	▼20.7%
2017	48,211	▲277.9%
2018	73,100	▲51.7%

== See also ==
- Bukovyna Airlines
- List of airports in Ukraine
- List of the busiest airports in Ukraine
- List of the busiest airports in Europe
- List of the busiest airports in the former USSR
