= Aeroflot Flight N-36 =

1976 aviation accident

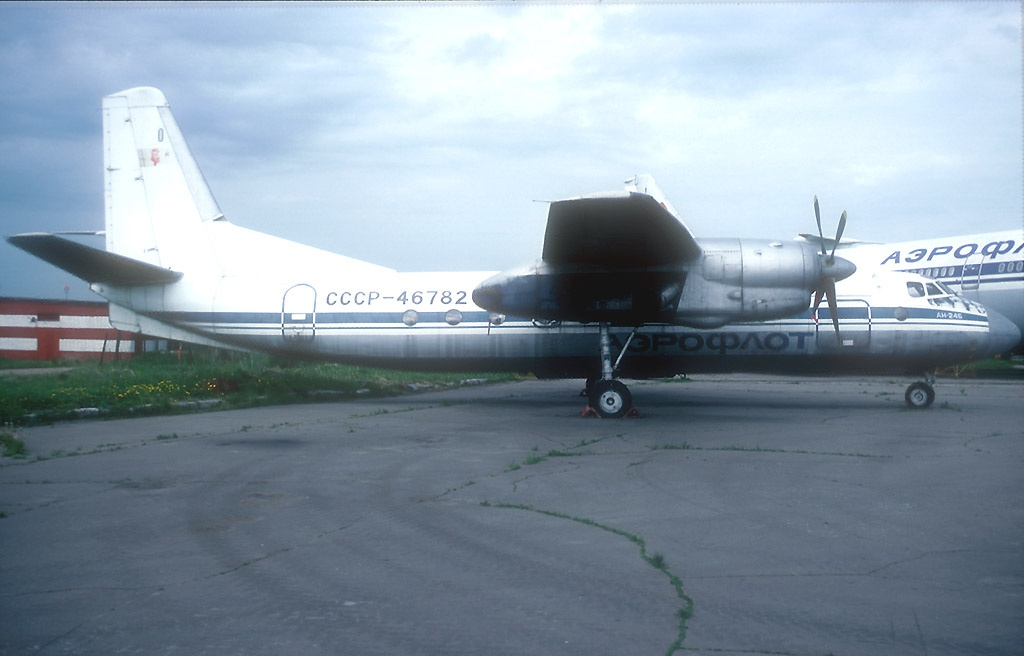
- An Aeroflot Antonov An-24, similar to the one involved in the accident

Accident
- Date: 17 December 1976
- Summary: Crashed on approach to landing
- Site: Kiev-Zhuliany Airport

Aircraft
- Aircraft type: Antonov An-24
- Operator: Aeroflot
- Registration: СССР-46722
- Flight origin: Chernivtsi International Airport
- Destination: Kyiv-Zhuliany Airport
- Passengers: 50
- Crew: 5
- Fatalities: 48
- Injuries: 6
- Survivors: 7

Aeroflot Flight N-36 was a scheduled domestic Aeroflot passenger flight from Chernivtsi International Airport to Zhuliany Airport, Ukrainian Soviet Socialist Republic that crashed on 17 December 1976 near Kiev Airport, resulting in 48 fatalities and 7 survivors.

== Aircraft ==
The aircraft involved in the accident was an Antonov An-24 designed to carry 50 passengers. It was built in 1963, and made its first flight on 8 June 1963. At the time of the accident the aircraft had accumulated 27,244 flying hours and 24,754 pressurization cycles.

== Accident ==
On 17 December 1976 at 20:32 Moscow time the An-24 took off from Chernivtsi on domestic flight N-36 from Chernivtsi to Kyiv airport with 50 passengers and five crew members on board.

The crew had a weather forecast of clouds at 100 to 1000–1500 meters, strong south-easterly wind, mist, drizzle, and snowfall. The weather forecast predicted a moderately bumpy flight with visibility of 1000–2000 meters, and strong icing in clouds. By the time aircraft 46722 left Chernivtsi, visibility in Kyiv International Airport (Zhuliany) had dropped to 800 meters and low clouds at 70 meters; the wind there was weak but icing in the clouds was strong. The Aero-meteorological station had been making frequent weather observations but had not detected the moment when horizontal visibility in Zhuliany Airport became less than 700 meters (minimum visibility for An-24) and did not warn air traffic controllers. In violation of instructions, from 20:55 to 22:10 there was no continuous monitoring of visibility at landing direction: 81° magnetic bearing. Crews of incoming flights despite the weather did not require factual values of horizontal and vertical visibility.

The flight made its final approach to Kyiv airport at 81° bearing using a non-directional beacon and radiolocation system of landing (TESLA) by commands of landing controller. The airport's instrument landing system was out of service for maintenance and testing. The traffic controller did not guide the flight by landing radar and didn't give information to crew at the time of entering the glide path. Because of this aircraft 46722 started lowering too late and vertical velocity was greater than designed.

At that moment air traffic control was in contact with 3 aircraft on the same radio frequency. As a result, ATC commands were ambiguous. The An-24 twice requested the distance to the runway but both times the broadcast was stepped on by other aircraft. 2500 meters from the runway's end the An-24 descended below the published glide path but was not advised by ATC. At the critical height (100 m) the pilots saw no runway lights but didn't abandon its approach.

At 30–35 meters above the ground the “danger height” alarm was activated. Pilots pulled the controls and the aircraft had a g-force of 1.9 g. But it was too late. Vertical velocity was too high and the height reserve was too small. Two seconds later the right part of the aircraft collided with a concrete fence of the non-directional radio beacon station 1265 meters from the runway's end and 40 meters right from the runway axis. The aircraft then touched the ground in the station's yard by the front and left landing gears, took off for a short time, then collided with a concrete fence at the opposite side of this yard. Seconds later the An-24's left wing collided with a group of trees, then the aircraft nose ran into a 4.5-meter railroad mound and the rest of the aircraft went on the rails and stopped 1150 m from the runway's end and 40 m right from the runway axis. A fire broke out and completely destroyed the aircraft.

Four crew members and 44 passengers died in this accident. A flight attendant and 6 passengers survived; one of these passengers had no injuries.

== Investigation ==
Because the aircraft had been destroyed by fire, the commission could not determine why the danger height alarm probe did not trigger at 60 m height as it should have done. There were serious errors in the work of the aero-meteorological station which reported to the air traffic controller horizontal visibility of 700 m and vertical visibility of 50 m. But weather observed 30 seconds after the accident was below weather the minimum for An-24. And aircraft 46440 which tried to land 2 minutes and 6 seconds before aircraft 46722, went to the dispersal field at Boryspil Airport because the pilots did not see airfield lights. So the real horizontal visibility at Zhuliany airport was below 700 meters and An-24 aircraft must not land in these conditions.
