= Chernivtsi Air and Space Museum =

Air and Space Museum

Air and Space Museum
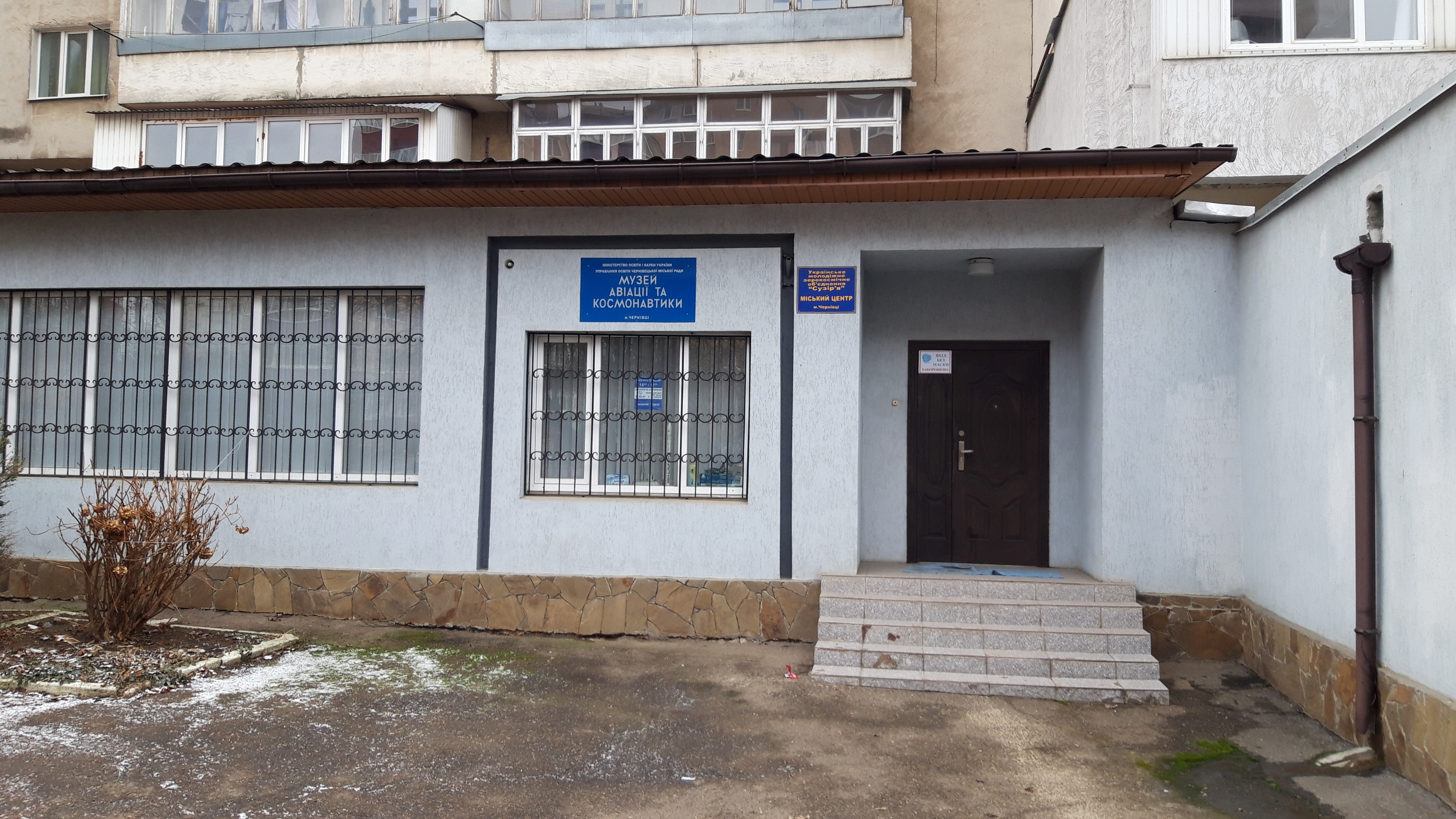
- Air and Space Museum in Chernivtsi, January 2022
- Established: 1999
- Location: 220 Holovna Street, Chernivtsi, Ukraine
- Coordinates: 48.2553°N 25.9571°E

The Air and Space Museum (Ukrainian: Музей авіації та космонавтики) is one of the museums in Chernivtsi, Ukraine, dedicated to aviation's beginnings and space investigation in the territory of present-day Ukraine, as well worldwide.

The museum was opened in 1999. It is the city and regional center of aeromodeling.

The museum's exhibitions describe the beginnings of aviation, e.g., the first aircraft flight in Chernivtsi, realized by Czech engineer and constructor Jan Kašpar on 23 October 1910, as well as space exploration achievements, in particular, the life story of the first Ukrainian astronaut Leonid Kadenyuk whose family roots in Chernivtsi Oblast.

Among the museum collection, there are many handmade aircraft models.
