= Takao Doi =

Japanese astronaut and engineer (born 1954)

- 土井 隆雄
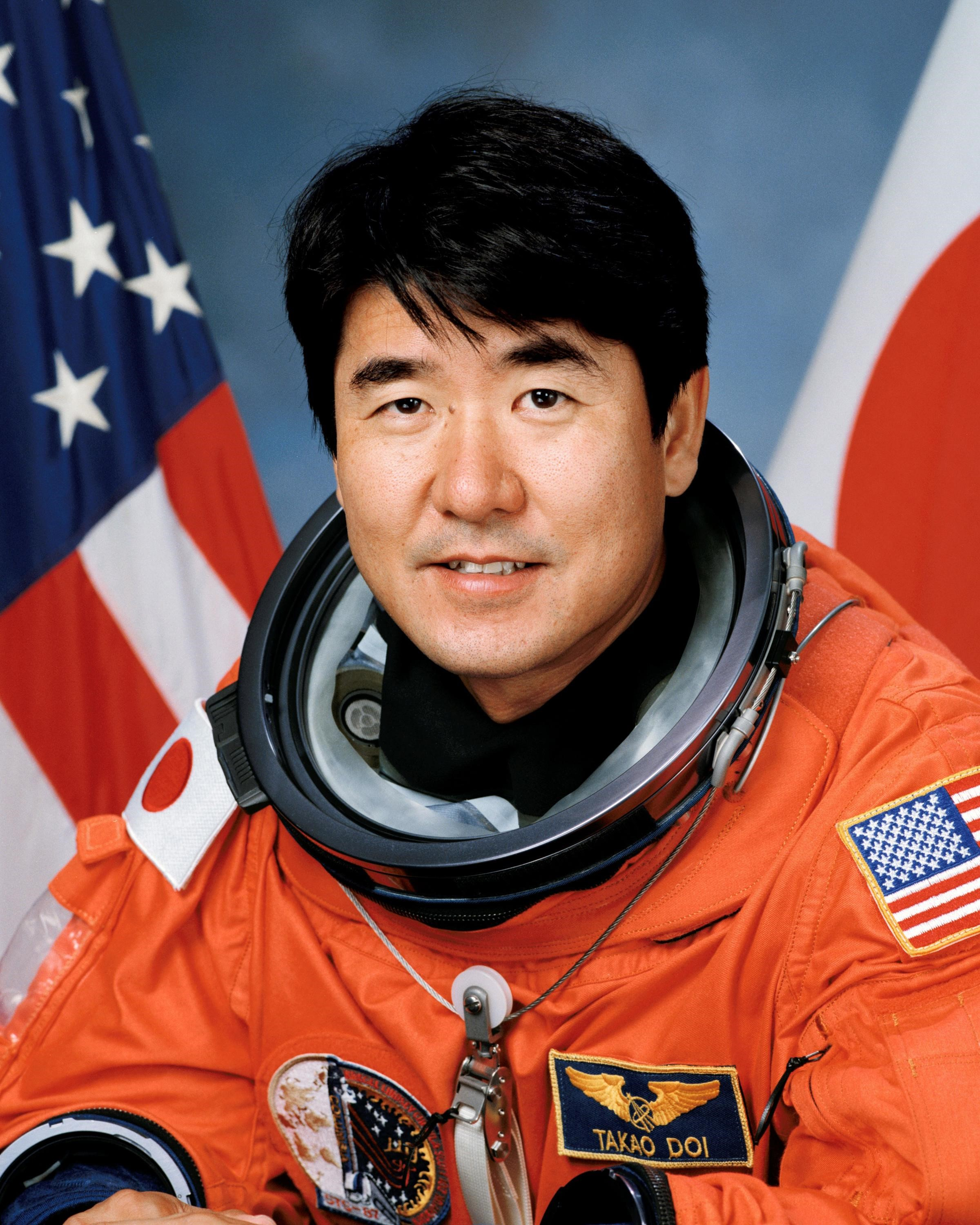
- Born: September 18, 1954 (age 72); Tokyo, Japan
- Occupation: Engineer
- Space career

JAXA astronaut
- Status: Retired
- Time in space: 31d 19h 35min
- Selection: 1985 NASDA Group, NASA Group 15 (1994)
- Total EVAs: 2
- Total EVA time: 12 hours, 43 minutes
- Missions: STS-87, STS-123
- Mission insignia
- Scientific career
- Fields: Astronomy
- Thesis: Internal velocities in the Orion Nebula (2004)

Takao Doi (土井 隆雄, Doi Takao; born September 18, 1954) is a Japanese astronaut, engineer and veteran of two NASA Space Shuttle missions.

== Early life and education ==
Doi holds a doctorate from the University of Tokyo in aerospace engineering, and has studied and published in the fields of propulsion systems and microgravity technology. He researched at the Institute of Space and Astronautical Science and was selected by NASDA as an astronaut candidate in 1985 for the Japanese crewed space program while also conducting research in the United States at NASA's Lewis Research Center and the University of Colorado at Boulder. Doi flew as a mission specialist aboard STS-87 in 1997, during which he became the first Japanese astronaut to conduct a spacewalk.

He received a Ph.D. in 1983 from the University of Tokyo, and also a PhD in Astronomy from Rice University in 2004.

As an avid amateur astronomer, he discovered supernovae SN 2002gw and SN 2007aa.

== Astronaut career ==
Takao Doi visited the International Space Station in March 2008 as a member of the STS-123 crew. STS-123 delivered the first module of the Japanese laboratory, Kibō, and the Canadian Dextre robot to the space station. During this mission, he became the first person to throw a boomerang in space that had been specifically designed for use in microgravity during spaceflight.

== Post-astronaut career ==
In September 2009, Doi retired from astronaut duty and started working as the chief of Space Applications Section of United Nations Office for Outer Space Affairs.

In April 2016, he became a professor at the Unit of Synergetic Studies for Space of Kyoto University and then at the Graduate School of Advanced Integrated Studies in Human Survivability (GSAIS) in April 2020.
