= STS-87 =

1997 American crewed spaceflight

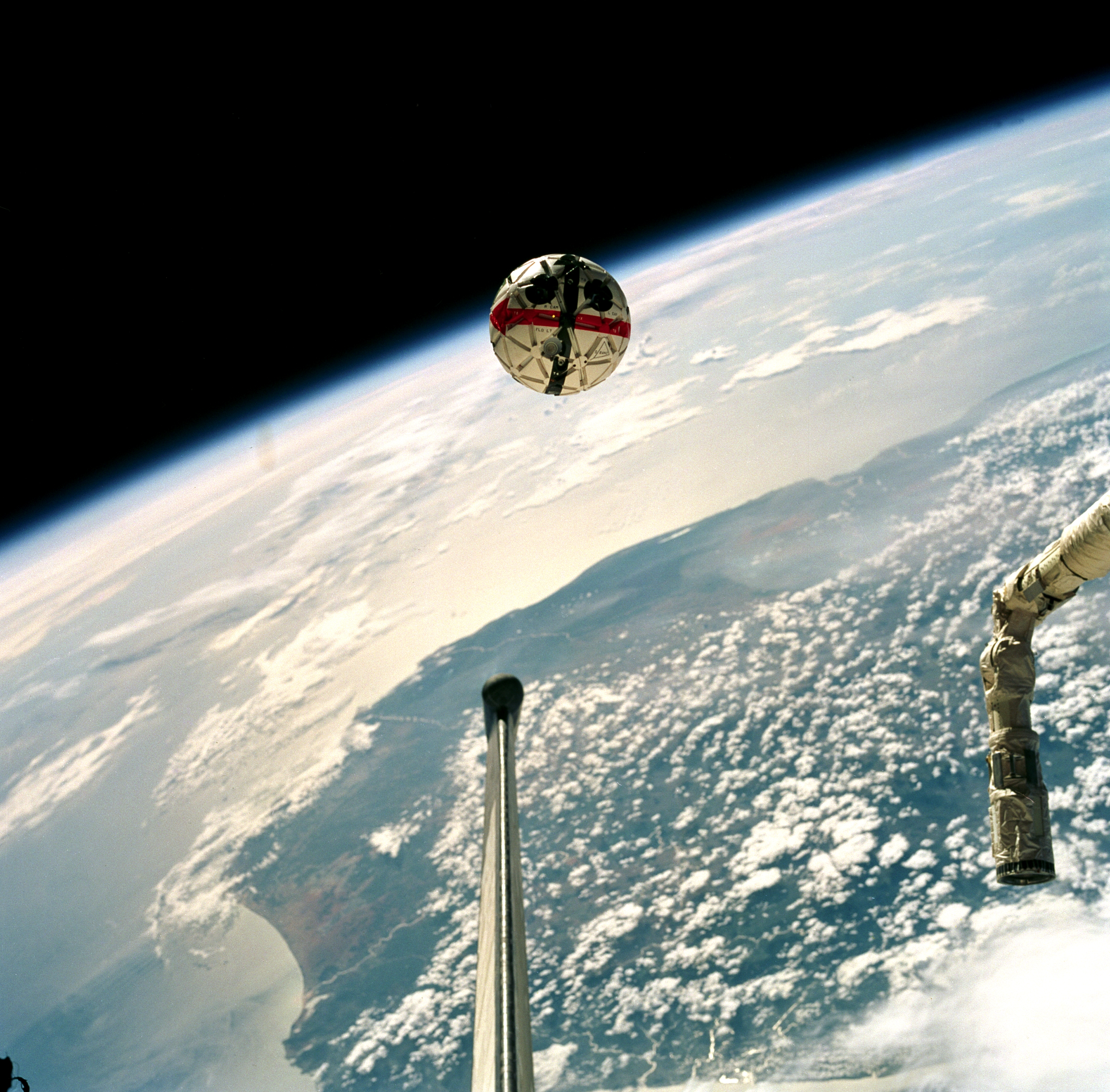
- AERCam Sprint, one of the USMP-4 payloads, in flight above Columbia's payload bay
- Names: Space Transportation System-87
- Mission type: Microgravity research Technology development
- Operator: NASA
- COSPAR ID: 1997-073A
- SATCAT no.: 25061
- Mission duration: 15 days, 16 hours, 35 minutes, 01 seconds
- Distance travelled: 10,500,000 kilometres (6,500,000 mi)

Spacecraft properties
- Spacecraft: Space Shuttle Columbia
- Landing mass: 102,717 kilograms (226,452 lb)
- Payload mass: 4,451 kilograms (9,813 lb)

Crew
- Crew size: 6
- Members: Kevin R. Kregel; Steven W. Lindsey; Winston E. Scott; Kalpana Chawla; Takao Doi; Leonid Kadeniuk

Start of mission
- Launch date: 19 November 1997, 19:46 UTC
- Launch site: Kennedy, LC-39B

End of mission
- Landing date: 5 December 1997, 12:20 UTC
- Landing site: Kennedy, SLF Runway 33

Orbital parameters
- Reference system: Geocentric
- Regime: Low Earth
- Perigee altitude: 273 kilometres (170 mi)
- Apogee altitude: 279 kilometres (173 mi)
- Inclination: 28.45 degrees
- Period: 90.0 min
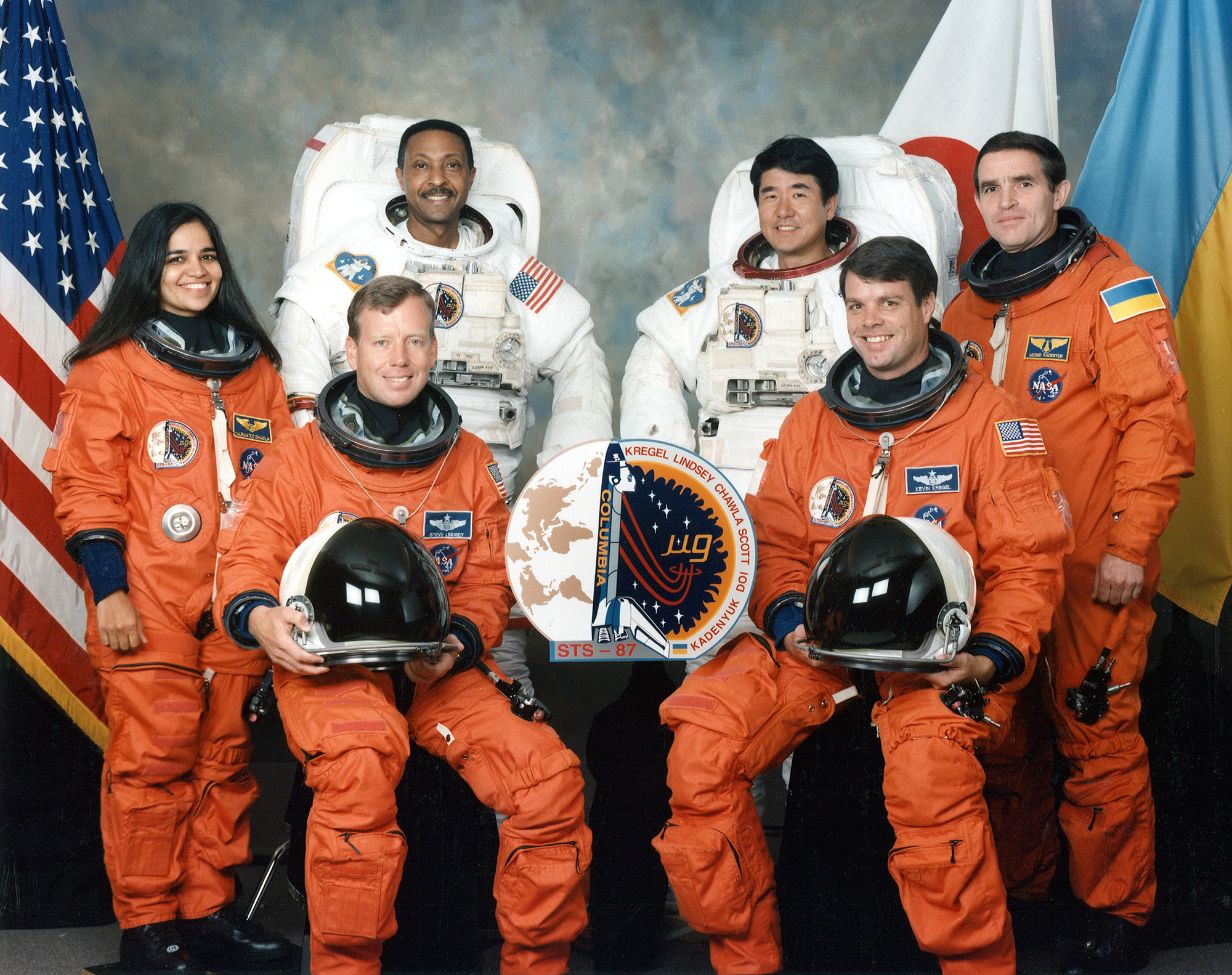
- Left to right - in orange: Chawla, Lindsey, Kregel, Kadenyuk; in white: Scott, Doi Space Shuttle program

STS-87 was a Space Shuttle mission launched from Launch Complex 39B of the Kennedy Space Center on 19 November 1997. It was the 88th flight of the Space Shuttle and the 24th flight of Columbia. The mission goals were to conduct experiments using the United States Microgravity Payload (USMP-4), conduct two EVAs, and deploy the SPARTAN-201 experiment. This mission marked the first time an EVA was performed from Columbia. EVAs from Columbia were originally planned for STS-5 in 1982 and STS-80 in 1996, but were canceled due to spacesuit and airlock problems, respectively. It also marked the first EVA conducted by a Japanese astronaut, Takao Doi.

== Crew ==
Position	Astronaut
Commander	(United States) Kevin R. Kregel; Third spaceflight
Pilot	(United States) Steven W. Lindsey; First spaceflight
Mission Specialist 1	(India) / (United States) Kalpana Chawla; First spaceflight
Mission Specialist 2 Flight Engineer	(United States) Winston E. Scott; Second and last spaceflight
Mission Specialist 3	(Japan) Takao Doi, JAXA; First spaceflight
Payload Specialist 1	(Ukraine) Leonid Kadeniuk, NSAU; Only spaceflight

=== Backup crew ===
Position	Astronaut
Payload Specialist 1	(Ukraine) Yaroslav Pustovyi; Would have been first spaceflight

=== Space walks ===
- Scott and Doi – EVA 1
- EVA 1 Start: 25 November 1997 – 00:02 UTC
- EVA 1 End: 25 November 1997 – 07:45 UTC
- Duration: 7 hours, 43 minutes
- Scott and Doi – EVA 2
- EVA 2 Start: 3 December 1997 – 09:09 UTC
- EVA 2 End: 3 December 1997 – 14:09 UTC
- Duration: 4 hours, 59 minutes

=== Crew seat assignments ===
Seat	Launch	Landing	Seats 1–4 are on the flight deck. Seats 5–7 are on the mid-deck.
1	Kregel		Seats 1–4 are on the flight deck. Seats 5–7 are on the mid-deck.
2	Lindsey		Seats 1–4 are on the flight deck. Seats 5–7 are on the mid-deck.
3	Chawla	Doi	Seats 1–4 are on the flight deck. Seats 5–7 are on the mid-deck.
4	Scott		Seats 1–4 are on the flight deck. Seats 5–7 are on the mid-deck.
5	Doi	Chawla	Seats 1–4 are on the flight deck. Seats 5–7 are on the mid-deck.
6	Kadeniuk		Seats 1–4 are on the flight deck. Seats 5–7 are on the mid-deck.
7	Unused		Seats 1–4 are on the flight deck. Seats 5–7 are on the mid-deck.

== Mission highlights ==
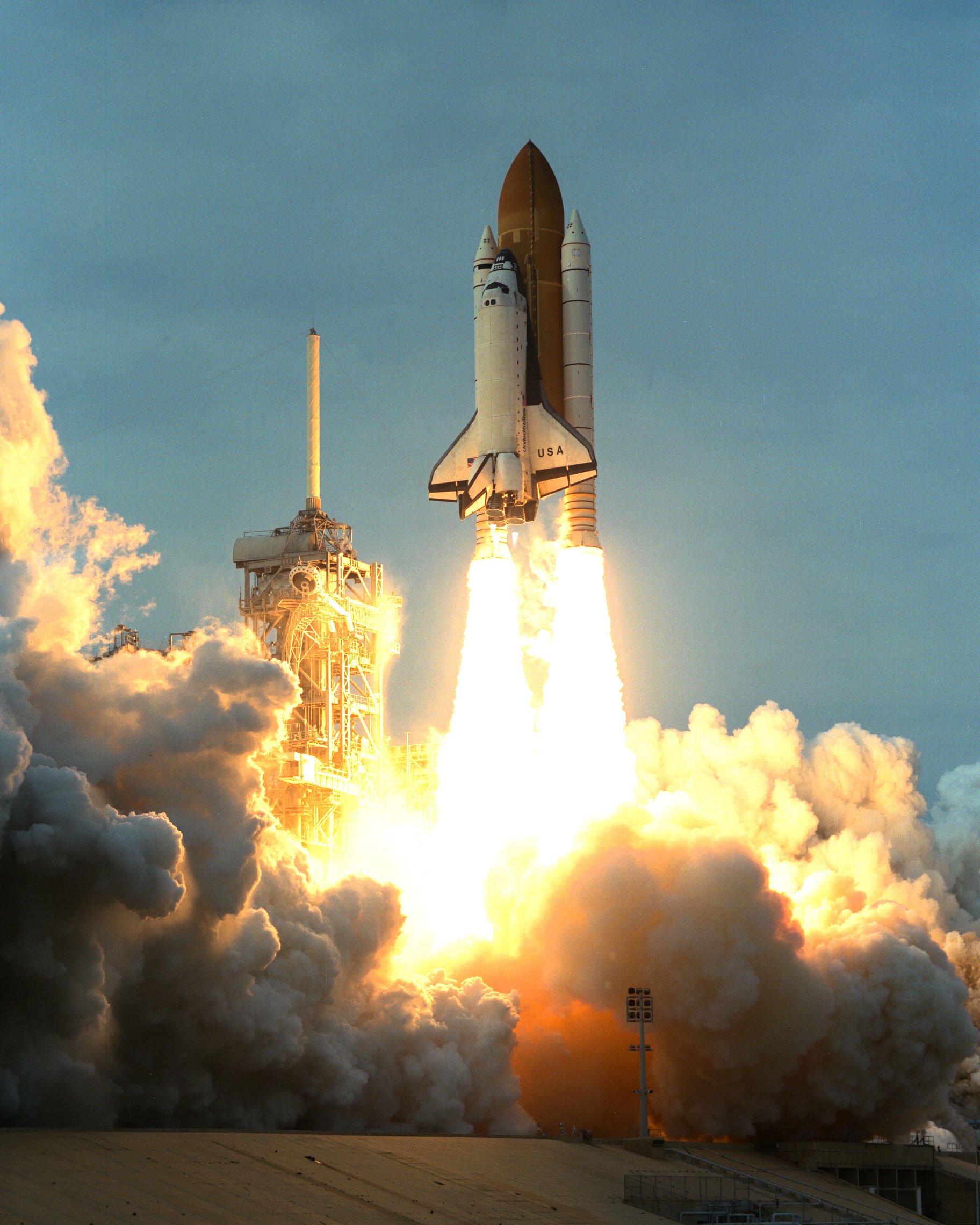
Launch of STS-87

STS-87 flew the United States Microgravity Payload (USMP-4), Spartan-201, Orbital Acceleration Research Experiment (OARE), TEVA Demonstration Flight Test 5 (EDFT-05), the Shuttle Ozone Limb Sending Experiment (SOLSE), the Loop Heat Pipe (LHP), the Sodium Sulfur Battery Experiment (NaSBE), the Turbulent GAS Jet Diffusion (G-744) experiment, and the Autonomous EVA Robotic Camera/Sprint (AERCam Sprint) experiment. Mid-deck experiments included the Middeck Glovebox Payload (MGBX) and the Collaborative Ukrainian Experiment (CUE).

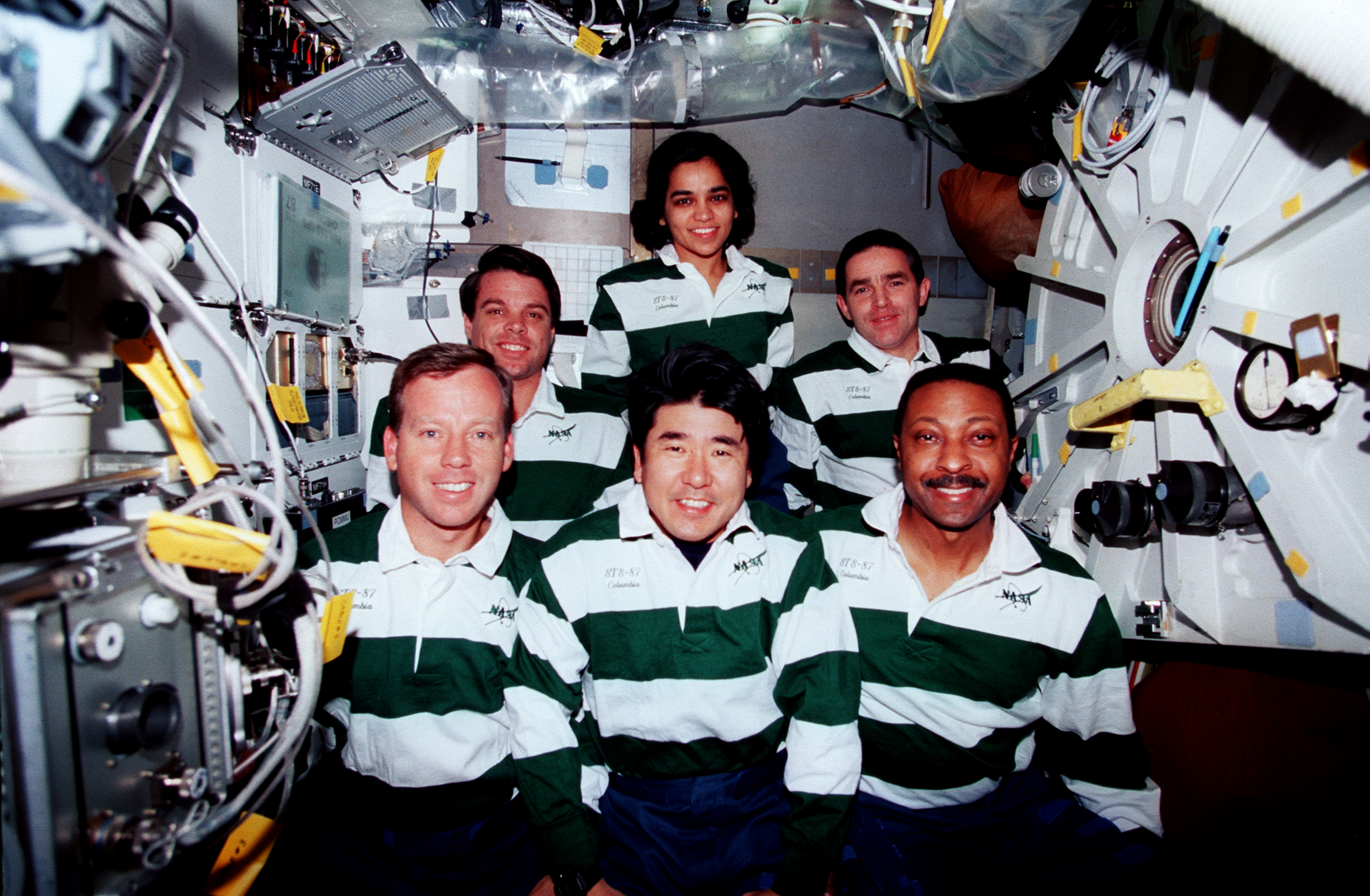
STS-87 in-flight crew portrait

=== United States Microgravity Payload ===
The United States Microgravity Payload (USMP-4) was a Spacelab project managed by Marshall Space Flight Center, Huntsville, Alabama. The complement of microgravity research experiments was divided between two Mission-Peculiar Experiment Support Structures (MPESS) in the payload bay. The extended mission capability offered by the Extended Duration Orbiter (EDO) kit provides an opportunity for additional science gathering time.

=== SPARTAN-201 ===
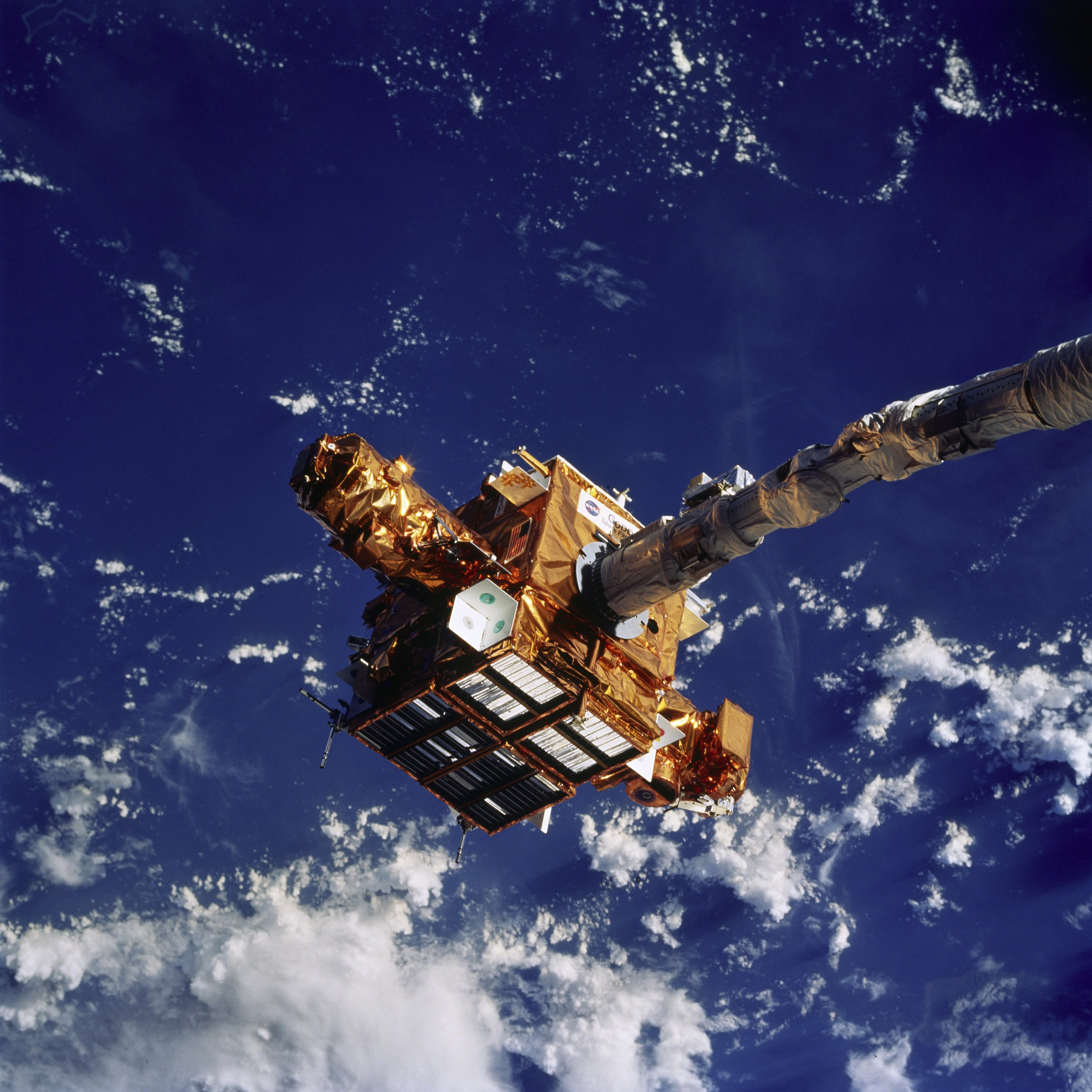
Deployment of SPARTAN

Spartan 201-04 was a Solar Physics Spacecraft designed to perform remote sensing of the hot outer layers of the Sun's atmosphere or solar corona. It was expected to be deployed on orbit 18 and retrieved on orbit 52. The objective of the observations was to investigate the mechanisms causing the heating of the solar corona and the acceleration of the solar wind that originates in the corona. Two primary experiments were the Ultraviolet Coronal Spectrometer from the Smithsonian Astrophysical Observatory and the White Light Coronograph (WLC) from the High Altitude Observatory. Spartan 201 had three secondary experiments. The Technology Experiment Augmenting Spartan (TEXAS) was a Radio Frequency (RF) communications experiment that provided flight experience for components baselined on future Spartan missions, and a real-time communications and control link with the primary Spartan 201 experiments. This link was used to provide a fine-pointing adjustment to the WLC based on solar images downlinked in real-time. The Video Guidance Sensor (VGS) Flight Experiment was a laser guidance system that tested a key component of the Automated Rendezvous and Capture (AR&C) system. The Spartan Auxiliary Mounting Plate (SPAM) was a small equipment mounting plate that provided a mounting location for small experiments or auxiliary equipment of the Spartan Flight Support Structure (SFSS) It was a honeycomb plate using an experimental silicon carbide aluminum face sheet material with an aluminum core.

=== Advanced Automated Directional Solidification Furnace ===
The Advanced Automated Directional Solidification Furnace (AADSF) was a sophisticated materials science facility used for studying a common method of processing semiconductor crystals called directional solidification. Solidification is the process of freezing materials. In the type of directional solidification used in AADSF, the liquid sample, enclosed in quartz ampoules, slowly solidified along the long axis. A mechanism moved the sample through varying temperature zones in the furnace. To start processing, the furnace melted all but one end of the sample towards the other. Once crystallized, the sample remained in the furnace to be examined post-flight. The solidification front was of particular interest to scientists because the flows found in the liquid material influence the final composition and structure of the solid and its properties.

=== Confined Helium Experiment ===
The Confined Helium Experiment (CHeX) provided a test of theories of the influence of boundaries on the matter by measuring the heat capacity of helium as it is confined to two dimensions.

=== Isothermal Dendritic Growth Experiment ===
Animated GIF of dendrite formation – NASA

The Isothermal Dendritic Growth Experiment (IDGE) was a materials science solidification experiment that researchers used to investigate a particular type of solidification called dendritic growth. Dendritic solidification is one of the most common forms of solidifying metals and alloys. When materials crystallize or solidify under certain conditions, they freeze unstably, resulting in tiny, tree-like crystalline forms called dendrites. Scientists are particularly interested in dendrite size, shape, and how the branches of the dendrites interact with each other. These characteristics largely determine the properties of the material.

Designed for research on the directional solidification of metallic alloys, the Material pour l'Étude des Phénomènes Intéressant la Solidification sur Terre et en Orbite (MEPHISTO) experiment was primarily interested in measuring the temperature, velocity, and shape of the solidification front (the point where the solid and liquid contact each other during solidification). MEPHISTO simultaneously processed three identical cylindrical samples of bismuth and tin alloy. In the first sample, the temperature fluctuations of the moving solidification were measured electrically, disturbing the sample. The position of the solid to liquid border was determined by an electrical resistance technique in the second sample. In the third sample, the faceted solidification front was marked at selected intervals with electric current pulses. The samples were returned to Earth for analysis. During the mission, MEPHISTO data were correlated with data from the Space Acceleration Measurement System (SAMS). By comparing data, scientists determined how accelerations aboard the shuttle disturbed the solid to the liquid interface.

=== Space Acceleration Measurement System ===
The Space Acceleration Measurement System (SAMS), sponsored by NASA Lewis Research Center (now NASA Glenn Research Center), was a microprocessor-driven data acquisition system designed to measure and record the microgravity acceleration environment of the USMP carrier. The SAMS had three triaxial sensor heads that were separate from the electronics package for remote positioning. In operation, the triaxial sensor head produced output signals in response to acceleration inputs. The signals were amplified, filtered, and converted into digital data. The digital acceleration data were transferred to optical disk memory for ground analysis and downlinked to the ground for near-real-time analysis. Each accelerometer had a mass suspended by a quartz element allowing movement along one axis only. A coil was attached to the mass and the assembly was placed between two permanent magnets. An applied acceleration displaced the mass from its resting position. This movement was sensed by a detector, causing SAMS electronics to send a voltage to the coil, producing exactly the magnetic field needed to restore the mass to its original position. The applied voltage was proportional to the applied acceleration and was output to the SAMS electronics as acceleration data.

=== Orbital Acceleration Research Experiment ===
While flying separately in the cargo bay, the Orbital Acceleration Research Experiment (OARE), sponsored by NASA Lewis Research Center (now Glenn Research Center), was an integral part of USMP-04. It was a highly sensitive instrument designed to measure low-level aerodynamic acceleration along the orbiter's principal axes in the free-molecular flow regime at orbital altitudes and in the transition regime during re-entry. OARE data were also downlinked during the mission for near-real-time analysis in support of the USMP science experiments. OARE data supported advances in space materials processing by providing measurements of the low-level, low-frequency disturbance environment affecting various microgravity experiments. OARE data also supported advances in orbital drag prediction technology by increasing the understanding of the fundamental flow phenomena in the upper atmosphere.

=== Shuttle Ozone Limb Sounding Experiment ===
The objective of the Shuttle Ozone Limb Sounding Experiment (SOLSE) was to determine the altitude distribution of ozone in an attempt to understand its behavior so that quantitative changes in the composition of the atmosphere can be predicted. SOLSE was intended to perform ozone distribution that a nadir instrument can achieve. This was performed using Charged Coupled Device (CCD) technology to eliminate moving parts in a simpler, low-cost, ozone mapping instrument. The experiment was housed in a Hitchhiker (HH/GAS) canister with a canister extension ring and equipped with a Hitchhiker Motorized Door Assembly (HMDA). Instrumentation included an Ultraviolet (UV) spectrograph with a CCD array detector, CCD array and visible light cameras, calibration lamp, optics, and baffling. Once in orbit, a crew member activated SOLSE which performed limb and Earth viewing observations. Limb observations focuses on the region 20 kilometers (12 mi) to 50 kilometers (31 mi) altitude above the horizon for the Earth's surface. Earth viewing observations enabled SOLSE to correlate the data with other nadir viewing, ozone instruments.

=== Loop Heat Pipe ===
The Loop Heat Pipe (LHP) test advanced thermal energy management technology and validating technology readiness for upcoming commercial spacecraft applications. The LHP was operated with anhydrous ammonia as the working fluid to transport thermal energy with high effective conductivity in zero gravity. LHP was a passive, two-phase flow heat transfer device that was capable of transporting up to 400 watts over a distance of 5 meters through semiflexible, small-diameter tubes. It used capillary forces to circulate the two-phase working fluid. The system was self-priming and totally passive in operation. When heat was applied to the LHP evaporator, part of the working fluid vaporized. The vapor flowed through the vapor transport lines and condensed, releasing heat. The condensation returned to the evaporator via capillary action through the liquid transport lines.

=== Sodium Sulfur Battery Experiment ===
The Sodium Sulfur Battery Experiment (NaSBE) characterized the performance of four 40 ampere-hour sodium-sulfur battery cells, representing the first test of sodium-sulfur battery technology in space. Each cell was composed of a sodium anode, sulfur cathode, and solid ceramic sodium ion-conducting electrolyte and separator. The cells were heated to 350 degrees Celsius to liquefy the sodium and sulfur. Once the anode and cathode were liquefied, the cells started to generate electrical power. Once in orbit, a crewmember activated NaSBE, and then the experiment was controlled by the GSFC Payload Operations Control Center (POCC).

=== Turbulent Gas Jet Diffusion Flames ===
The Turbulent Gas Jet Diffusion Flames (TGDF) payload was a secondary payload that used the standard Get Away Special carrier. Its purpose was to gain an understanding of the fundamental characteristics of transitional and turbulent gas jet diffusion flames under microgravity conditions and to acquire data to aid in predicting the behavior of transitional and turbulent gas jet diffusion flames under normal and microgravity environments. TGDF imposed large-scale controlled disturbances on well-defined laminar microgravity diffusion flames. They were on axisymmetric perturbations to laminar flames. The variables for the proposed tests were the frequency of the disturbance mechanism, which was either 2.5 Hz, 5 Hz, or 7.5 Hz.

=== Get Away Special ===
The Get Away Special (GAS G-036) payload canister contained four separate experiments that hydrated cement samples, recorded configuration stability of fluid samples, and exposed computer discs, compact discs, and asphalt samples to exosphere conditions in the cargo bay of the orbiter. The experiments were the Cement Mixing Experiment (CME), the Configuration Stability of Fluid Experiment (CSFE), the Computer Compact Disc Evaluation Experiment (CDEE), and the Asphalt Evaluation Experiment (AEE).

=== Extended Duration Orbiter ===
The Extended Duration Orbiter (EDO) Pallet was a 15-foot (4.6 m) diameter cryo-kit wafer structure. Weighing 352 kilograms (776 lb), it provided support for tanks, associated control panels, and avionics equipment. The tanks stored 167 kilograms (368 lb) of liquid hydrogen at −250 degrees Celsius, and 1,417 kilograms (3,124 lb) of liquid oxygen at −176 degrees Celsius. The total empty mass of the system was 1,620 kilograms (3,570 lb). When filled with cryogens, system mass was approximately 3,200 kilograms (7,100 lb). Oxygen and hydrogen were supplied to the orbiter's three electrical power generating fuel cells, where they were converted into sufficient electrical energy to support the average four family-member house for approximately six months. About 1,360 kilograms (3,000 lb) of pure drinking water was also produced by the fuel cells. With the EDO pallet, the orbiter could support a flight for a maximum of 18 days. Longer on-orbit missions benefit microgravity research, life sciences research, Earth and celestial observations, human adaptation to the zero-G environment, and support to the Space Station.

=== Middeck Glove Box ===
The mid-deck Glove Box (MGBX) was a facility designed for materials science and biological science experiment handling. It consisted of two primary systems; an Interface Frame (IF) and a Glovebox (GB). The MGBX facility (with associated electronics) provided an enclosed working area for experimental manipulation and observation on the shuttle mid-deck. The MGBX experiments on this flight were WCI – The objective of the Wetting Characteristics of Immiscibles was to investigate the influence of alloy/ampoule wetting characteristics on the segregation of immiscible liquids during microgravity processing. The Enclosed Laminar Flames (ELF) experiment objective was to validate the zero-gravity Burke-Schumann model and the gravity-dependent Hegde-Bahadori extension of the model, investigate the importance of the buoyancy-dependent flow field as affected by oxidizer flow on flame stabilization, examine the state relationships of co-flow diffusion flames under the influence of buoyancy conditions (gravity versus pressure), and study the flow vortex and diffusion flame interactions. The Particle Engulfment and Pushing by Solidifying Interfaces (PEP) experiment objectives were to generate an accurate value for the critical velocity in a convection-free environment, validate the present theoretical model, enhance fundamental understanding of dynamics of insoluble particles at liquid/solid interfaces, and improve understanding of the physics associated with the solidification of liquid metals-ceramic particles mixtures.

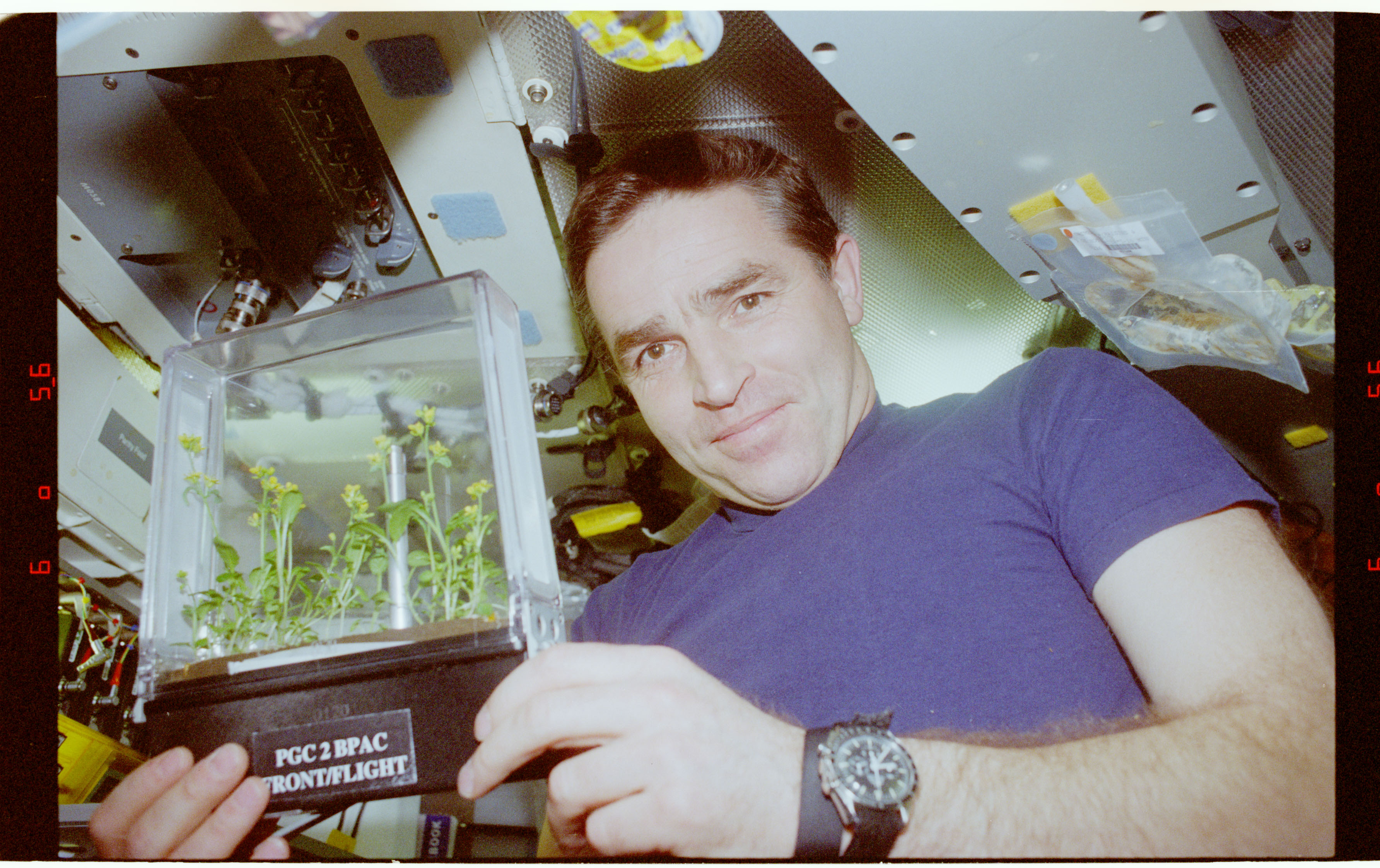
Payload Specialist Leonid Kadenyuk holds up a Collaborative Ukrainian Experiment (CUE) Brassica rapa in the middeck.

=== Collaborative Ukraine Experiment ===
Led by Kadenyuk, the Collaborative Ukraine Experiment (CUE) was a mid-deck payload designed to study the effects of microgravity on plant growth. The CUE was composed of a group of experiments flown in the Plant Growth Facility (PGF) and in the Biological Research in Canisters (BRIC). The experiments also required the use of a Gaseous Nitrogen (GN2) Freezer and the fixation hardware. Investigators in Ukraine and the United States (Kansas State University and Louisiana State University) selected the experiments as a model for scientific collaboration between the two countries. The PGF supported plant growth for up to 30 days by providing acceptable environmental conditions for normal plant growth. The PGF was composed of the following subsystems: Control and Data Management Subsystems (CDMS), Fluorescent Light Module (FLM), Atmospheric Control Module (ACM), Plant Growth Chambers (PGCs), Support Structure Assembly (SSA), and the Generic External Shell (GES). The complete PGF replaced one mid-deck locker and operated on 28 V direct current (dc) power. The plant specimen studied in the PGF was Brassica rapa (turnip).

== Extra-vehicular activities ==
The Extravehicular Activity Development Flight Test – 05 (EDFT-05) consisted of the payload bay hardware elements of Detailed Test Objective (DTO) 671, EVA Hardware for Future Scheduled Extravehicular Missions. EDFT – 05's main objective was to demonstrate International Space Station (ISS) on-orbit, end-to-end EVA assembly, and maintenance operations. The other DTOs included in this test were DTO 672, Extravehicular Mobility Unit (EMU) Electrical Cuff Checklist and DTO 833, EMU Thermal Comfort, and EVA Worksite Thermal Environment. Another objective was to expand the EVA experience base for ground and flight crews. Two EVA's were performed on this mission to accomplish these DTOs.

=== Autonomous EVA Robotic Camera ===
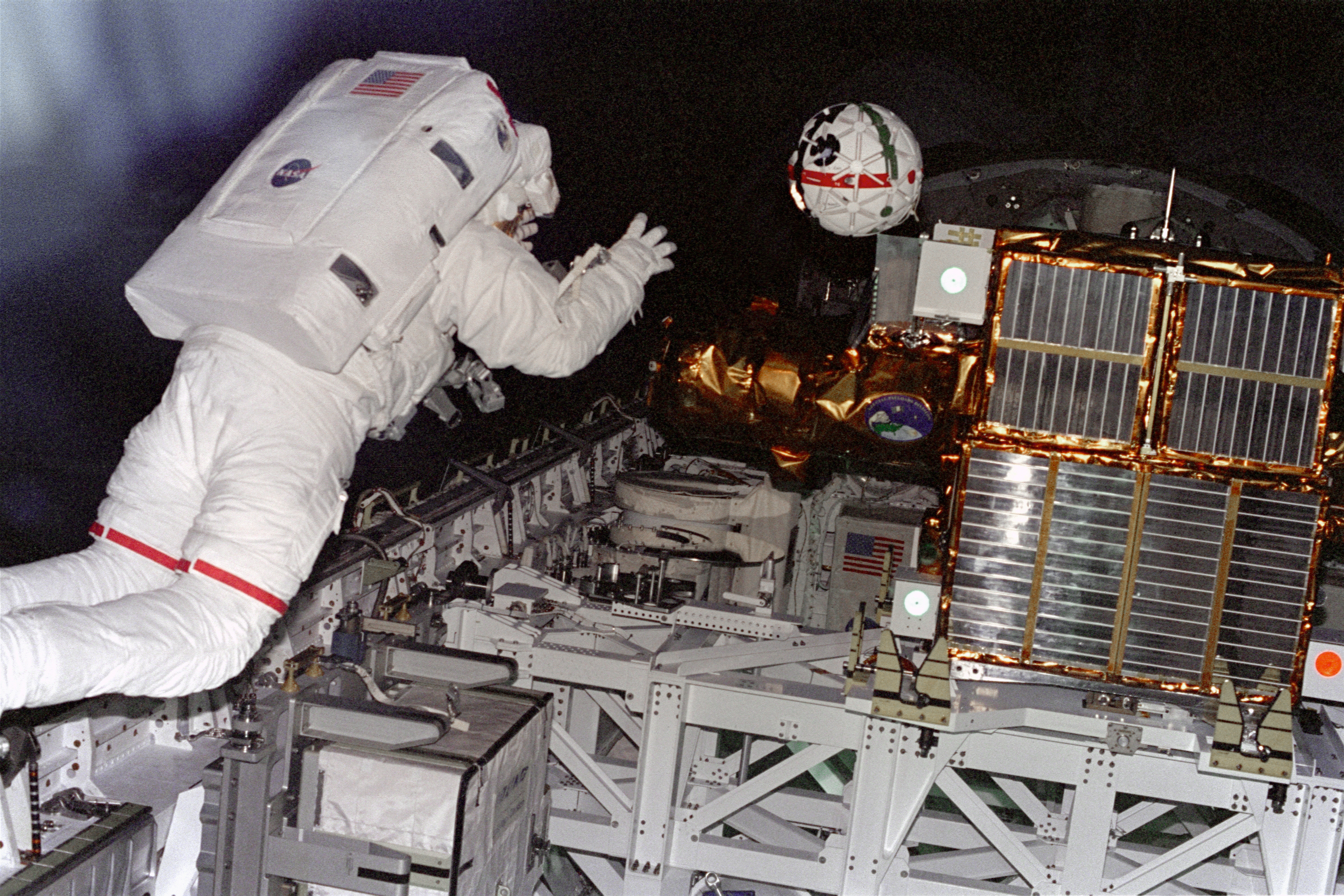
Winston Scott retrieves Sprint

The Autonomous EVA Robotic Camera/Sprint (AERCam/Sprint) was a small, unobtrusive, free-flying camera platform for use outside a spacecraft. The free-flyer had a self-contained cold gas propulsion system giving it the capability to be propelled with 6 degrees of the freedom control system. Onboard the free-flyer were rate sensors to provide data for an automatic attitude hold capability. AERCam/Sprint was a spherical vehicle that moved slowly and was covered in a soft cushioning material to prevent damage in the event of an impact. The design philosophy was to keep the energy low by keeping the velocities and mass low while providing a mechanism to absorb any energy from an impact. The free-flyer platform was controlled from inside the Orbiter by using a small control station. The operator input motion commands from a single, Aid For EVA Rescue (SAFER) device controller. The commands were sent from the control station to the free-flyer via a Radio Frequency (RF) modem link operating in the ultra-high frequency (UHF) range.

== A comic character in space ==
The mission marked a lesser-known first for having a comic book character being created for a space-going mission, the first to actually fly into space, and the first to safely return to Earth. The sponsor and manager of the Enclosed Laminar Flames experiment, Lewis Stocker, noticed the experiment's abbreviation as ELF and, being an avowed reader of the comic book series Elfquest, asked the series' creators Richard and Wendy Pini to create a logo. Originally, he hoped the series' own stargazer, Skywise, could be used, but to avoid copyright issues, a unique character was created to accompany the experiment insignia, whose name was dubbed Starfire.

== Wake-up calls ==
Sleeping shuttle astronauts were often awakened with a short piece of music, a tradition that began during the Gemini and Apollo missions. Each track was specially chosen, sometimes by their families, and usually had a special meaning to an individual member of the crew or was applicable to their daily activities. Astronauts Bill McArthur, Ellen Ochoa, Chris Hadfield, and Marc Garneau were the CAPCOMs for the mission, and called in to Columbia's astronauts each day.

Flight day	Song	Artist/composer	Played for	Link
Day 2	"Hitchin' A Ride"	Vanity Fare		WAV
Day 3	"New York, New York"	Frank Sinatra	Kevin Kregel	WAV
Day 4	"Ginga Shounen Tai" (Galaxy Boys)		Takao Doi	WAV
Day 5	"The Air Force Song"	U.S. Air Force Academy Cadet Chorale	Steve Lindsey	WAV
Day 6	"Walk of Life"	Dire Straits	Winston Scott	WAV
Day 7	"Mishra Piloo"	Ravi Shankar	Kalpana Chawla	WAV
Day 8	Ukrainian National Anthem		Leonid Kadenyuk	WAV
Day 9	"America the Beautiful"	U.S. Air Force Academy Cadet Chorale	Kevin Kregel	WAV
Day 10	"Florida State University Seminoles Fight Song"		Winston Scott	WAV
Day 11	"California Dreamin'"	The Mamas and the Papas	Kevin Kregel	WAV
Day 12	"This Island Earth"	The Nylons		WAV
Day 13	"Theme from Ultraman"		Takao Doi	WAV
Day 14	"Centerfield (song)"	John Fogerty	Kevin Kregel	WAV
Day 15	"Flight of the Bumblebee"	Nikolai Rimsky-Korsakov	Leonid Kadenyuk	WAV
Day 16	"Should I Stay or Should I Go"	The Clash	Kevin Kregel	WAV

The terminator line as taken from STS 87

EVA

Terminator

EVA

Earth Observation Photo

Columbia's Payload Bay

Winston Scott Deploys AERCSprint

== See also ==
- List of human spaceflights
- List of Space Shuttle missions
- Outline of space science
