= Mehmadpur =

Mehmadpur or Mehmudpur may refer to the following villages in India:

- Mehmadpur, Karnal, Haryana
- Mehmadpur, Bhulath, Kapurthala, Punjab
- Mehmadpur, Fatehgarh Sahib, Punjab
- Mehmadpur, Jalandhar, Shahkot, Punjab
- Mehmudpur, Nakodar, Jalandhar, Punjab
- Mehmudpur, SBS Nagar, Punjab

== See also ==
- Mehmedpur, Gurdaspur, Punjab
