= Pundri Assembly constituency =

Legislative Assembly constituency in Haryana State, India

Coordinates: 29.76°N 76.56°E

Pundri
- Constituency No. 18 for the Haryana Legislative Assembly

Constituency details
- Country: India
- Region: North India
- State: Haryana
- District: Kaithal
- Lok Sabha constituency: Kurukshetra
- Total electors: 2,06,279
- Reservation: None

Member of Legislative Assembly
- 15th Haryana Legislative Assembly
- Incumbent Satpal Jamba
- Party: Bhartiya Janata Party
- Elected year: 2024

Pundri Assembly constituency is one of the 90 Legislative Assembly constituencies of Haryana state in India.

It is part of Kaithal district, and encompasses the town of Pundri and some surrounding areas. As of 2019, it was represented by Satpal Jamba of Bharatiya Janata Party.

== Members of the Legislative Assembly ==
Year	Member	Party
1967	R. P. Singh	Indian National Congress
1968	Ishwar Singh	Independent
1972	Ishwar Singh	Indian National Congress
1977	Agnivesh	Janata Party
1982	Ishwar Singh	Indian National Congress
1987	Makhan Singh	Lokdal
1991	Ishwar Singh	Indian National Congress
1996	Narender Sharma	Independent
2000	Tejvir Singh	Independent
2005	Dinesh Kaushik	Independent
2009	Sultan	Independent
2014	Dinesh Kaushik	Independent
2019	Randhir Singh Gollen	Independent
2024	Satpal Jamba	Bharatiya Janata Party

== Election results ==
=== Assembly Election 2024 ===
2024 Haryana Legislative Assembly election: Pundri
Party	Candidate	Votes	%	±%
BJP	Satpal Jamba	42,805	31.48%	▲16.15
Independent	Satbir Bhana	40,608	29.86%	New
INC	Sultan Jadula	26,341	19.37%	▼1.21
Independent	Gurinder Singh Habri	8,097	5.95%	New
Independent	Sajjan Singh Dhull	4,937	3.63%	New
BSP	Hisam Singh Bhukka	4,891	3.60%	▼0.51
Independent	Dinesh Kaushik	3,105	2.28%	New
AAP	Narender Sharma	2,571	1.89%	New
NOTA	None of the Above	229	0.17%	▼0.26
Independent	Randhir Singh Gollen	90	0.07%	New
Margin of victory		2,197	1.62%	▼7.74
Turnout		1,35,745	70.91%	▼5.12
Registered electors		1,92,443		▲6.15
BJP gain from Independent		Swing	▲16.15	

=== Assembly Election 2019 ===
2019 Haryana Legislative Assembly election: Pundri
Party	Candidate	Votes	%	±%
Independent	Randhir Singh Gollen	41,008	29.94%	
INC	Satbir Bhana	28,184	20.58%	▲18.02
BJP	Vedpal Advocate	20,990	15.33%	▼8.95
Independent	Dinesh Kaushik	16,142	11.79%	
Independent	Narender Sharma	14,242	10.40%	
JJP	Rajesh Kumar (Raju Dhull Pai)	8,138	5.94%	
BSP	Sunita Dhull	5,626	4.11%	▲1.8
SUCI(C)	Comrede Krishan Chand	838	0.61%	
Margin of victory		12,824	9.36%	▲5.86
Turnout		1,36,959	75.28%	▼7.54
Registered electors		1,81,938		▲9.24
Independent hold		Swing	▲2.17	

=== Assembly Election 2014 ===
2014 Haryana Legislative Assembly election: Pundri
Party	Candidate	Votes	%	±%
Independent	Dinesh Kaushik	38,312	27.78%	
BJP	Randhir Singh Gollen	33,480	24.27%	▲22.72
INLD	Tejvir Singh	16,169	11.72%	▼7.57
Independent	Narender Sharma	15,004	10.88%	
Independent	Satvir Bhana	14,918	10.82%	
Independent	Balkar Singh	9,476	6.87%	
INC	Ravi Mehla	3,522	2.55%	▼25.85
BSP	Karamvir Gujjar	3,186	2.31%	▼11.72
Independent	Subhash Chand	825	0.60%	
Margin of victory		4,832	3.50%	▲0.20
Turnout		1,37,929	82.82%	▼0.88
Registered electors		1,66,546		▲13.54
Independent hold		Swing	▼3.93	

=== Assembly Election 2009 ===
2009 Haryana Legislative Assembly election: Pundri
Party	Candidate	Votes	%	±%
Independent	Sultan	38,929	31.71%	
INC	Dinesh Kaushik	34,878	28.41%	▲9.58
INLD	Sajjan Singh	23,690	19.30%	▼5.25
BSP	Narender Sharma	17,227	14.03%	▲12.01
HJC(BL)	Kanwar Pal Sharma	2,686	2.19%	
BJP	Krishan Gujjar	1,906	1.55%	▼14.99
Independent	Gopal Krishan Bhatt	1,007	0.82%	
Margin of victory		4,051	3.30%	▼4.58
Turnout		1,22,774	83.70%	▲3.87
Registered electors		1,46,691		▲14.96
Independent hold		Swing	▼0.71	

=== Assembly Election 2005 ===
2005 Haryana Legislative Assembly election: Pundri
Party	Candidate	Votes	%	±%
Independent	Dinesh Kaushik	33,024	32.42%	
INLD	Narender Sharma	24,998	24.54%	
INC	Bhag Singh	19,176	18.83%	▲13.33
BJP	Randhir Singh Gollen	16,854	16.55%	▲6.22
BRP	Engineer Kali Ram Mohna	2,275	2.23%	
BSP	Prem Singh Dhiman	2,058	2.02%	▼1.34
Independent	Joginder	1,078	1.06%	
Independent	Hitender	789	0.77%	
Margin of victory		8,026	7.88%	▲5.87
Turnout		1,01,863	79.83%	▲3.72
Registered electors		1,27,606		▲10.12
Independent hold		Swing	▲7.98	

=== Assembly Election 2000 ===
2000 Haryana Legislative Assembly election: Pundri
Party	Candidate	Votes	%	±%
Independent	Tejvir Singh	21,559	24.44%	
Independent	Narinder S/O Thaukar Dass	19,790	22.44%	
Independent	Dinesh Kaushik	16,618	18.84%	
Independent	Makhan Singh	10,363	11.75%	
BJP	Randhir Singh Gollen	9,103	10.32%	
INC	Balkar Singh	4,848	5.50%	▼18.44
BSP	Raghveer Singh	2,965	3.36%	▼5.26
Independent	Amar Nath	1,306	1.48%	
Margin of victory		1,769	2.01%	▲0.56
Turnout		88,194	76.99%	▲0.55
Registered electors		1,15,883		▲3.20
Independent hold		Swing	▼0.94	

=== Assembly Election 1996 ===
1996 Haryana Legislative Assembly election: Pundri
Party	Candidate	Votes	%	±%
Independent	Narender Sharma	21,542	25.39%	
INC	Ishwar Singh	20,311	23.94%	▼9.29
SAP	Makkhan Singh	16,323	19.24%	
HVP	Krishan Kumar Walia	15,226	17.94%	
BSP	Baldev Singh	7,319	8.63%	
CPI	Sher Singh	860	1.01%	
Independent	Om Parkash	585	0.69%	
Independent	Joginder	498	0.59%	
Margin of victory		1,231	1.45%	▼10.55
Turnout		84,851	78.32%	▲4.43
Registered electors		1,12,295		▲17.12
Independent gain from INC		Swing	▼7.83	

=== Assembly Election 1991 ===
1991 Haryana Legislative Assembly election: Pundri
Party	Candidate	Votes	%	±%
INC	Ishwar S/O Sind Ram	22,660	33.22%	▲0.01
JP	Makhan Singh	14,476	21.22%	▲11.6
Independent	Amar Singh S/O Ram Kishan	11,696	17.15%	
BJP	Miter Sain	7,638	11.20%	
JD	Mukhtiar Singh	7,637	11.20%	
Independent	Babu Ram	1,334	1.96%	
Independent	Raj Kumar	1,070	1.57%	
Margin of victory		8,184	12.00%	▼7.38
Turnout		68,206	74.50%	▼2.32
Registered electors		95,882		▲10.08
INC gain from LKD		Swing	▼19.37	

=== Assembly Election 1987 ===
1987 Haryana Legislative Assembly election: Pundri
Party	Candidate	Votes	%	±%
LKD	Makhan Singh	33,647	52.59%	▲47.6
INC	Ishwar Singh S/O Singhram	21,250	33.21%	▼9.04
JP	Bhag Singh	6,159	9.63%	▼31.58
Independent	Babu Ram	1,027	1.61%	
Independent	Tek Chand	424	0.66%	
Independent	Sona Devi	343	0.54%	
Margin of victory		12,397	19.38%	▲18.33
Turnout		63,979	74.59%	▲2.11
Registered electors		87,102		▲17.28
LKD gain from INC		Swing	▲10.33	

=== Assembly Election 1982 ===
1982 Haryana Legislative Assembly election: Pundri
Party	Candidate	Votes	%	±%
INC	Ishwar Singh	22,392	42.26%	▲23.95
JP	Bhag Singh	21,837	41.21%	▼17.64
LKD	Sher Singh	2,645	4.99%	
Independent	Prem	1,795	3.39%	
Independent	Babu Ram	1,397	2.64%	
Independent	Satish Kumar	1,366	2.58%	
Independent	Mewa Ram	353	0.67%	
Independent	Kamla	337	0.64%	
Independent	Harbans Lal	326	0.62%	
Independent	Didar Singh	306	0.58%	
Margin of victory		555	1.05%	▼39.50
Turnout		52,988	72.59%	▲4.99
Registered electors		74,270		▲19.57
INC gain from JP		Swing	▼16.60	

=== Assembly Election 1977 ===
1977 Haryana Legislative Assembly election: Pundri
Party	Candidate	Votes	%	±%
JP	Agnivesh	24,256	58.85%	
INC	Antram	7,546	18.31%	▼36.23
Independent	Sultan Singh	2,831	6.87%	
Independent	Brij Lal	2,729	6.62%	
Independent	Balbir Singh	2,633	6.39%	
Independent	Bhim	317	0.77%	
Independent	Man Chand Barsana	316	0.77%	
Margin of victory		16,710	40.54%	▲22.61
Turnout		41,214	67.11%	▼6.61
Registered electors		62,112		▲2.67
JP gain from INC		Swing	▲4.31	

=== Assembly Election 1972 ===
1972 Haryana Legislative Assembly election: Pundri
Party	Candidate	Votes	%	±%
INC	Ishwar Singh	24,074	54.54%	▲10.51
INC(O)	Marcharan Singh	16,158	36.61%	
Independent	Pirtha	2,454	5.56%	
Independent	Sardara Ram	748	1.69%	
Independent	Phul Chand	704	1.59%	
Margin of victory		7,916	17.93%	▲16.53
Turnout		44,138	74.83%	▲15.39
Registered electors		60,496		▲11.35
INC gain from Independent		Swing	▲9.11	

=== Assembly Election 1968 ===
1968 Haryana Legislative Assembly election: Pundri
Party	Candidate	Votes	%	±%
Independent	Ishwar Singh	14,211	45.43%	
INC	Tara Singh	13,773	44.03%	▼5.01
BKD	Kasturi Lal	2,691	8.60%	
SWA	Ram Singh	370	1.18%	
Independent	Bal Krishan	233	0.74%	
Margin of victory		438	1.40%	▼14.36
Turnout		31,278	58.84%	▼20.23
Registered electors		54,330		▲2.91
Independent gain from INC		Swing	▼3.61	

=== Assembly Election 1967 ===
1967 Haryana Legislative Assembly election: Pundri
Party	Candidate	Votes	%	±%
INC	R. P. Singh	20,143	49.04%	
Independent	I. Singh	13,670	33.28%	
Independent	C. Bhuj	5,322	12.96%	
Independent	K. Ram	1,939	4.72%	
Margin of victory		6,473	15.76%	
Turnout		41,074	81.73%	
Registered electors		52,792		
INC win (new seat)				

== See also ==
- List of constituencies of the Haryana Legislative Assembly
- Kaithal district
