= Tagore Baal Niketan Sr. Sec. School, Karnal =

Tagore Baal Niketan Senior Secondary School
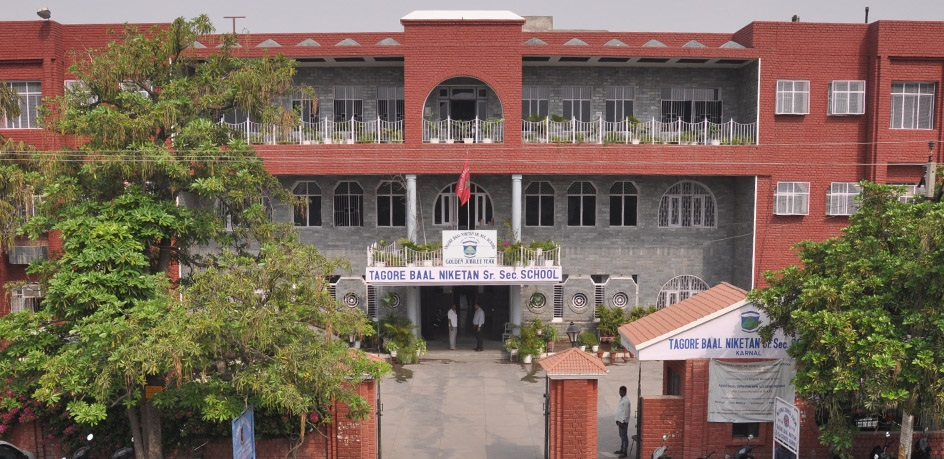

Location
- Sector-6, Market road, Urban estate, Karnal, Haryana; India; 29.6743882°N 77.0058788°E

Information
- Type: Private School
- Established: 1963
- Founder: Ms. Vimla Raheja
- School board: CBSE
- Website: tagorebaalniketan.com

Tagore Baal Niketan Senior Secondary School is a private school founded in 1963 in Karnal, Haryana state, India.

It is affiliated to the Central Board of Secondary Education (CBSE) which is the largest educational board in the country, teaching students from Nursery up to the twelfth grade. It is recognized by the Department of Education, Government of Haryana and the Ministry of Human Resource Development, Government of India.

Tagore Baal Niketan is named in honour of India's first Nobel laureate - Gurudev Rabindranath Tagore.

== History ==
The school was started on 1 August 1963 by the educationist and visionary Ms. Vimla Raheja in Karnal, Haryana (India).

The school was started on a small premises with a handful of students.

== Administration ==
The school is governed by a board of trustees. The chairman of the trust and also director of the school is Mr. R.M. Raheja.

The current principal of the school is Dr. Rajan Lamba. The administrator is Mr. Karan Raheja.

== Faculty and curriculum ==
Medium of Instruction - The medium of instruction is mainly English. However, Hindi medium is also available for some specific subjects.

Streams Offered - The school offers a selection of 19 subjects across four streams in Senior Secondary Classes.

Streams:-

- Medical
- Non-medical
- Commerce
- Arts

Subjects

English	Physics	Economics	Physical Education
Hindi	Chemistry	History	Music - Hindustani Instrumental
Punjabi	Biology	Geography	Music - Hindustani Vocal
Sanskrit	Accountancy	Political Science	Painting / Fine Arts
Mathematics	Business Studies	Computer Science	

== Beyond curriculum ==
Student Governing Body - Tagore's student governing body is called the School Vikas Mandal. Students are elected each year at the beginning of session for Vikas Mandal. It is constituted of:

- President
- Vice-President
- Head Boy
- Head Girl
- Deputy Head Boy
- Deputy Head Girl
- Secretary (English) – Boy and Girl
- Secretary (Hindi) – Boy and Girl
- Joint Secretary (English) – Boy and Girl
- Joint Secretary (Hindi) – Boy and Girl
- Cultural Activities In-charge – Boy and Girl
- Games Captain – Boy and Girl
- Games Vice-Captain – Boy and Girl
- Secretary NSS (National Service Scheme) – Boy and Girl
- Sergeant NCC (National Cadet Corps) – Boy and Girl
- Captain – Scouts
- Captain – Guides
- Overall Discipline in Charge

Houses - Tagore follows the traditional system of Houses, where in students are randomly organized into 6 Houses, which they represent in various Intra-school competitions and compete for the coveted annual sports shield. Each house is headed by a House Captain (Boy and Girl) and House Vice-Captain (Boy and Girl) and overseen by a teacher appointed as the House Master.

The ceremonial oath for all office bearers is undertaken on the day of ‘Tagore Jayanti’ every year.

Extra-curricular activities - These include:

- Elocution
- Creative Writing
- Drama
- Quiz
- Declamation & Debates
- Dance
- Calligraphy
- Art & Craft
- Mehndi & Rangoli
- Yoga

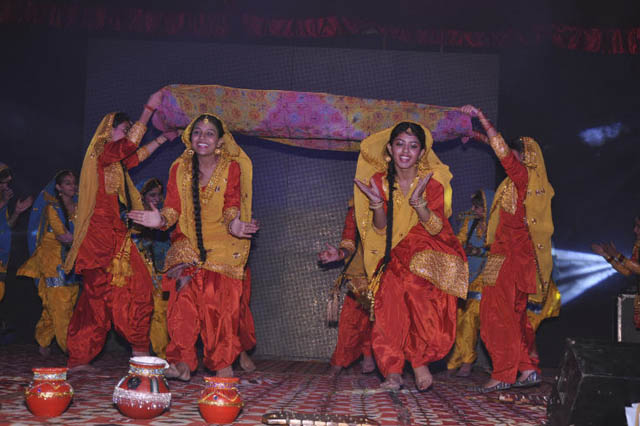
Dance competition

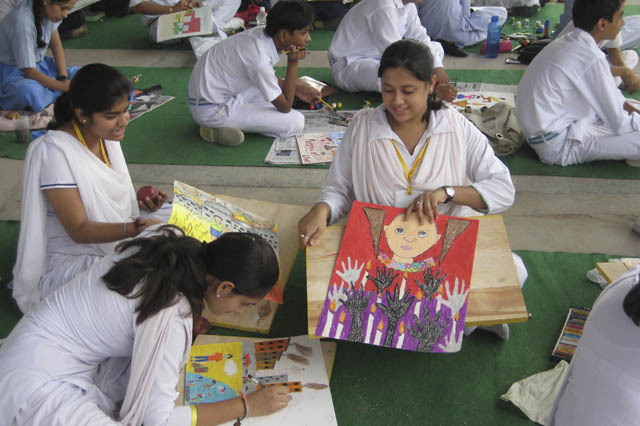
Art competition

Intra-School competitions are held regularly.

Bharat Scouts and Guides - The school organizes scouts and guides camps every year and participates in state level and national level camps and jamborees attended by scouts and guides from different states. Our smart and spirited scouts and guides have been awarded prizes by the governor and president of India for their outstanding performance.

National Service Scheme (NSS) - N.S.S. volunteers of our school collect and send clothes and money for the victims of natural calamities, rail accidents and organize rallies to raise awareness in the society against social evils to justify the N.S.S. motto ‘Not Me But You’. Every year National Integration Camps, Mega Camps, Pre RD/RD Camps and National Adventure Camps are held in which our volunteers not only participate with great zeal but also win laurels.

National Cadet Corps (NCC) - Being the only school in Karnal, which has been sanctioned an NCC (Air Wing) Troop in 1998. The NCC cadets get the necessary orientation, training and discipline of the services so that they may be motivated to join the defence as officers and justifying the NCC Motto of ‘Unity and Discipline’.

== Alumni ==
Dr. Kalpana Chawla the first Indian American astronaut and first Indian-born woman in space. Born in Karnal, India in 1962, she completed her schooling from Tagore Baal Niketan in 1976. She was one of the 7 crew members aboard the ill-fated space shuttle Columbia when it disintegrated upon re-entry into the Earth's atmosphere over Texas in 2003 killing all crew members.

== Scholarships and awards ==
Scholarships are awarded to the meritorious students and financial help is also provided to needy students. Merit certificates and prizes are awarded to the deserving students in various fields. Fee concession/scholarships are granted regularly for scholastic excellence and Co-Curricular activities.

== Summer Camp at NASA ==
NASA selects two student every year for "NASA Summer Camp" since 1998 to give honour to the Kalpana Chawla who was former student of Tagore Bal Niketan.

== See also ==
- Education in India
- Literacy in India
- List of institutions of higher education in Haryana
