= Pundri =

Pundri (Pundrik)
- City
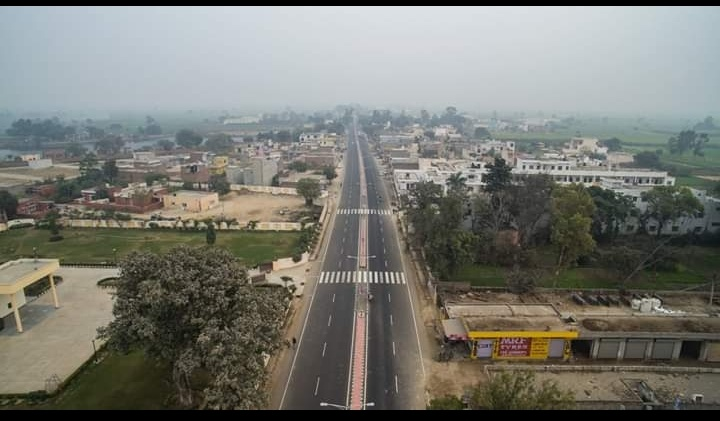
- kaithal pundri highway

- Location in Haryana, India Pundri (India)
- Coordinates: 29.75°N 76.55°E

Government
  - Member of Parliament: Naveen Jindal
  - Member of the Legislative Assembly: Satpal Jamba
- Elevation: 240.06 m (787.6 ft)

Population (2011)
  - Total: 33,484 (UA)

Languages
  - Official: Hindi
  - Spoken: Hindi, English, Haryanvi, Punjabi
- Time zone: UTC+5:30 (IST)
- PIN: 136026
- Telephone code: 01746
- ISO 3166 code: IN-HR
- Vehicle registration: HR 08
- Lok Sabha constituency: Kurukshetra
- Website: haryana.gov.in

Pundri is a City and a municipal committee in Kaithal district of the Indian state of Haryana. Pundri along with Pundrak was named after the sage Pundarik, who is highly revered by all Hindus. Pundri is the seat of a Tehsil and also a Haryana Vidhan Sabha constituency currently represented by Satpal Jamba.

Pundri is also known for its Firni, a sweet which is so popular that nearly 100 quintals of it are sold in the month of August around the festival of Teej.

Water Flour Mill few remaining in India now, but one of them is a mill which is 123 years old near Pundri. This mill was built in 1890 and it is located at the ground floor. Pundri is also known as Fatehpur-Pundri for the village of Fatehpur adjoining it.

== Geography ==
Pundri is located at 29.75°N 76.55°E. It has an average elevation of 224 metres (734 feet).

== Demographics ==
As of the 2011 India census, Total population of Pundri is 33,484.[1] The sex ratio is 888 (F/M) and 12.02% of the population is under six years of age. The effective literacy rate is 67.8%; male literacy is 74.04% and female literacy is 60.75%. Punjabi, Haryanvi and Hindi are major languages.

== Religious places ==
- Pundrik tirth
- Devi Mandir Fatehpur
- Guru Bharamanand Aashram
- Gurudwara Shri Pundri Sahib
- Gyarah Rudri Shiv Mandir

== Transport ==
Pundri, is well connected with road network as it many cities Kaithal, Delhi, Chandigarh, Karnal, Kurukshetra.

== Educational institutes ==
=== Government Schools ===
- Govt. Senior Secondary School, Pundri
- Govt. Girls Senior Secondary School, Pundri
- Govt. Senior Secondary School, Fatehpur

=== Private Schools ===
- DAV Public School, Pundri
- BPR Public School, Pundri
- RN Public School , Pundri
- Shweta Royal Public School
- Dhruv public school
- Anglo sanskrit senior secondary school

=== College ===
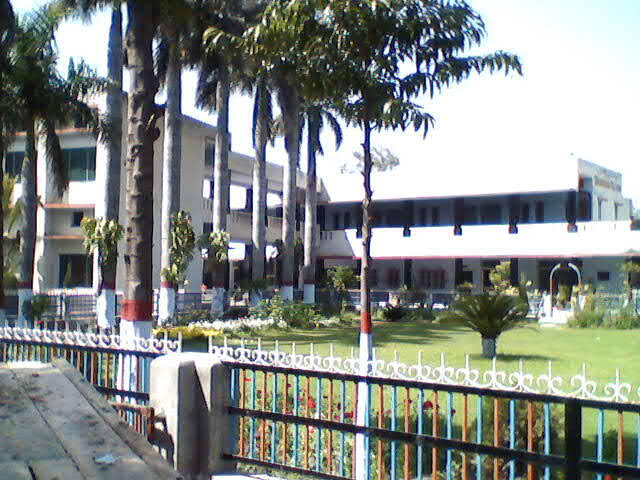
DAV College Pundri

- DAV College, Pundri
- KMV College, Pundri
- Maharaja Aggarsain College of Education
- Dr Bhim Rao Ambedkar Institute of Technology
- Govt. ITI, Pundri

=== Gurukul ===
- Pundri Gurukul
- Gurukul Takshshila 5 milestone Pundri karnal highway

== Notable people ==
- Satpal Jamba is the current MLA.
- Randhir Singh Gollen was the MLA. He is also chairman of Haryana state tourism.
- Dinesh Kaushik (politician)
- Ishwar Singh

== See also ==
- Kaithal
