= Dharam Vir Ahluwalia =

Indian physicist

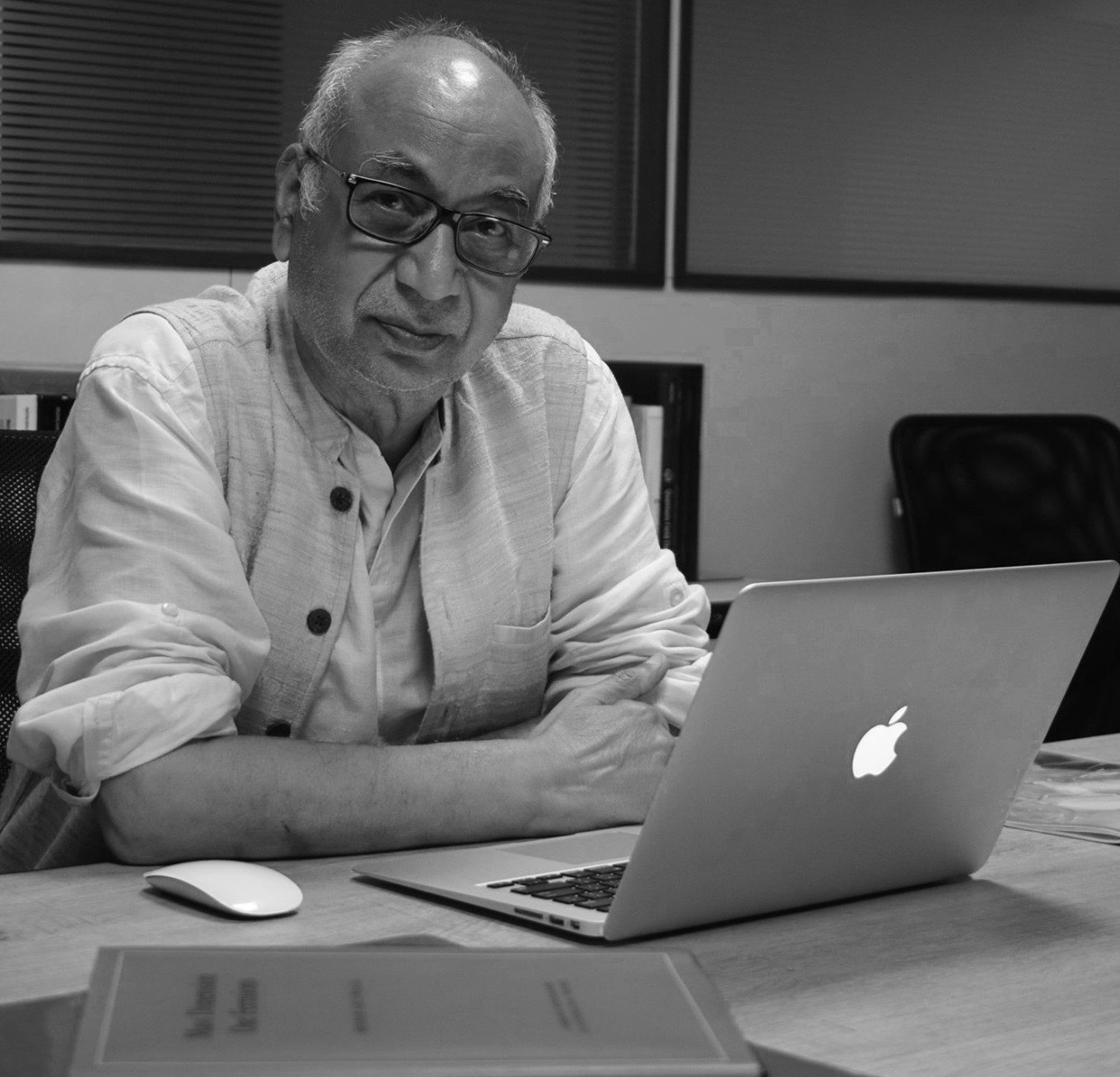
- Born: 20 October 1952; Fatehpur, Kaithal, India
- Died: 10 October 2023 (aged 70); Melbourne, Victoria, Australia
- Education: Texas A&M University (M.S., Ph.D.), M.A, B.Sc
- Known for: Mass Dimension One Fermions neutrino mixing matrix gravitationally induced phases non-commutative spacetime
- Awards: GRF First Prize; GRF Fourth Prize; GRF Fifth Prize; GRF Third Prize
- Scientific career
- Fields: Theoretical Physics (Mass Dimension One Fermions)
- Institutions: Los Alamos National Laboratory; University of Zacatecas; University of Canterbury; Jet Propulsion Laboratory

Dharam Vir Ahluwalia (born October 20, 1952, in Fatehpur, Kaithal, India) was an Indian-born American theoretical physicist who made significant contributions to physics of neutrino oscillations, gravitationally induced phases, interface of the gravitational and quantum realms, and mass dimension one fermions. In 2019 he published Mass Dimension One Fermions .

== Early life and education ==
Dharam Vir was born in India. He was a US citizen and a permanent resident of New Zealand.

In 1991, he obtained a Ph.D. from Texas A&M University. During 1992 to 1998 he was at the Los Alamos National Laboratory as a director's postdoctoral fellow and later as a scientist/consultant. From 1998 to 2006 he was a professor of mathematics at the Autonomous University of Zacatecas in Mexico. For the period 2006-2013 he served as a senior lecturer in physics at the University of Canterbury in Christchurch, New Zealand, and afterwards he was a visiting professor at numerous other institutes and universities.

== Awards and editorships ==
He was recipient of a Gravity Research Foundation First Prize (1996, jointly with Christoph Burgard), Fourth Prize (1997), Third Prize (2004), and Fifth Prize (2000), with Gilma Adunas, E. Rodriguez-Milla.

He was on the editorial boards of Modern Physics Letters A, the International Journal of Modern Physics A and the International Journal of Modern Physics D.

== Selected publications ==
- Mass Dimension One Fermions (Cambridge Monographs on Mathematical Physics, Cambridge University Press, July 2019).
- A new class of mass dimension one fermions.
- Spin-half bosons with mass dimension three-half: Towards a resolution of the cosmological constant problem.
- The Theory of Local Mass Dimension One Fermions of Spin One Half.
- Neutrino mixing matrix.
- Gravitationally induced neutrino-oscillation phases and neutrino oscillations as powerful energy transport mechanism for type-II supernova explosions.
- GR and QM imply quantized spacetime.
- Wave particle duality at the Planck scale.
