= Dinesh Kaushik (politician) =

Indian politician

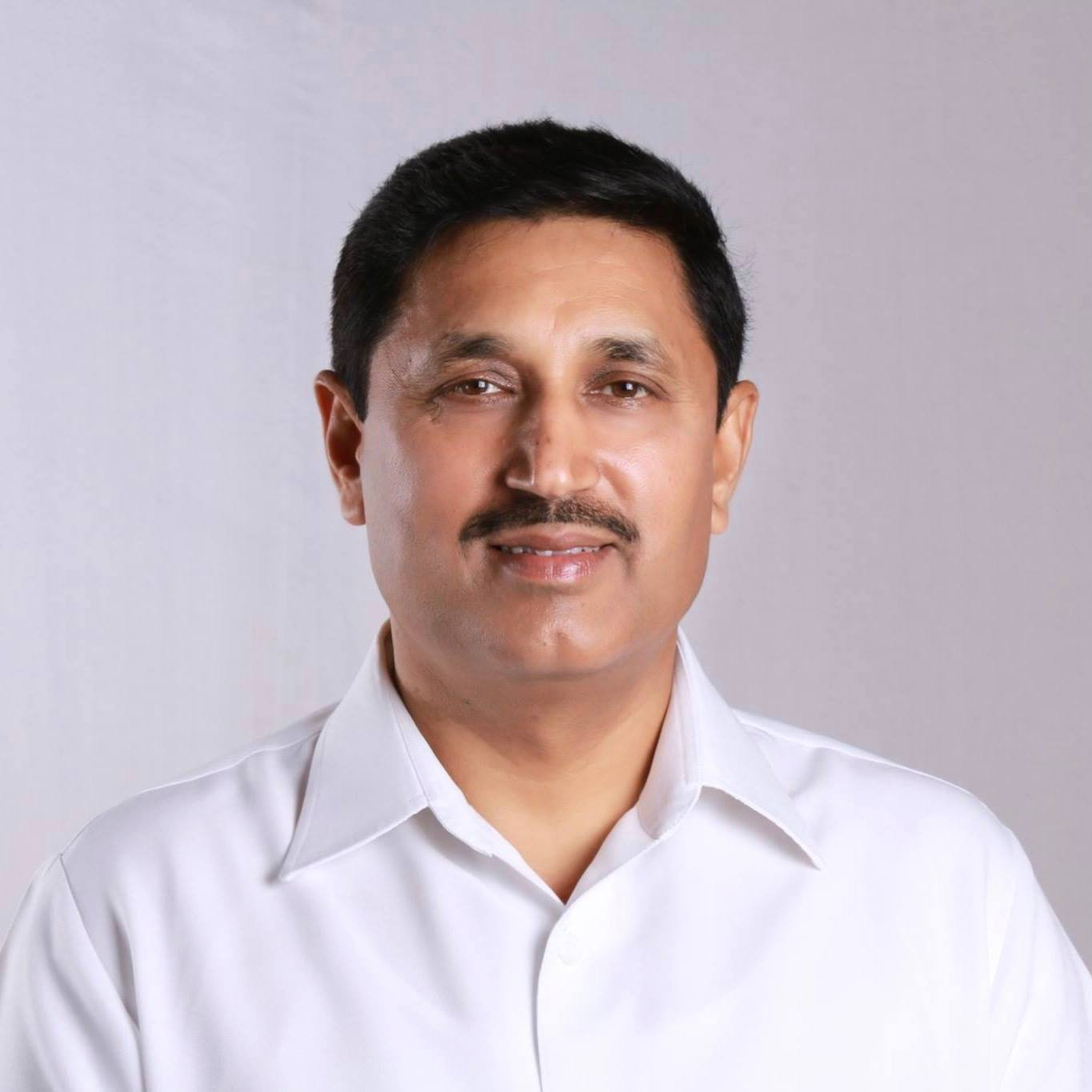

Member of Haryana Legislative Assembly from Pundri
- In office 2014–2018
- Constituency: Pundri

Personal details
- Born: 13 April 1960 (age 66) Fatehpur, Punjab, India (now in Haryana, India)
- Party: Independent
- Spouse: Sandhya Kaushik
- Children: 2

Dinesh Kaushik (born 13 April 1960) is an independent politician and current Member of Legislative Assembly in Haryana, India. He represents Pundri constituency in the Haryana Legislative Assembly.

== Career ==
Author and academic D. C. Verma, in his book Haryana, highlights Kaushik's mobilising efforts in Karnal since the late 1980s. Verma notes that he campaigned and organised for more than a decade in the area without stepping into electoral politics.

The Pundri constituency in Haryana has consistently elected independent MLAs since 1996. Kaushik won it as such a candidate in the 2005 state assembly elections Kaushik was among nine former independent MLAs from the state who joined the Indian National Congress party after those elections. Kaushik won the 2014 Assembly campaign, again as an independent candidate. Soon after being elected in 2014, Kaushik indicated his support for Manohar Lal Khattar, the BJP leader who became Chief Minister. He is a member of the Public Accounts Committee (PAC) of the Haryana Legislative Assembly and has been part of the Library Committee and the Committee on Local Bodies and Panchayati Raj.

== Personal life ==
Kaushik is the chairman of the BPR Educational Institutions.

Kaushik is married to Sandhya Kaushik and has two sons. His son Sudhanshu Kaushik is an international youth activist.
