= Pilni =

- village
- Location in Haryana, India Pilni (India)
- Coordinates: 29.728318°N 76.505214°E
- Country: India
- State: Haryana
- District: Kaithal district tahsil pundri

Government
  - Type: Local government
  - Body: Panchayat

Area
  - Total: 6.33 km^{2} (2.44 sq mi)
- Elevation: 237 m (778 ft)

Population (2011)
  - Total: 3,023
  - Density: 478/km^{2} (1,240/sq mi)

Languages
  - Official: Hindi
- Time zone: UTC+5:30 (IST)
- PIN: 136043
- Telephone code: 01746
- Vehicle registration: HR-08
- Literacy: 68.35% (total); 79.88% (male); 55.50% (female)
- Sex ratio: 891 ♂/♀

Pilni village is located in pundri Tehsil of Kaithal district in Haryana, India. It is situated 6 kilometres (3.7 mi) away from sub-district headquarter Pundri and 20 kilometres (12 mi) away from district headquarter Kaithal. As per 2009 stats, Pilni village is also a gram panchayat.

== Demographics ==
Most of the population of the village are Indian and widely spoken languages are Hindi and Haryanavi.

== Schools ==
- Govt. Sr. Secondary Sechool.

== Transportation ==
The nearby Railway stations to Pilni village are New Kaithal Halt Railway station (NKLE) and Kaithal Railway station (KLE).

From Kaithal bus stand, bus services are also available to Delhi, Hisar, Chandigarh, Jammu and many other places.
