= Kalpana Chawla Government Medical College =

Medical College in Haryana, India

Kalpana Chawla Government Medical College and Hospital
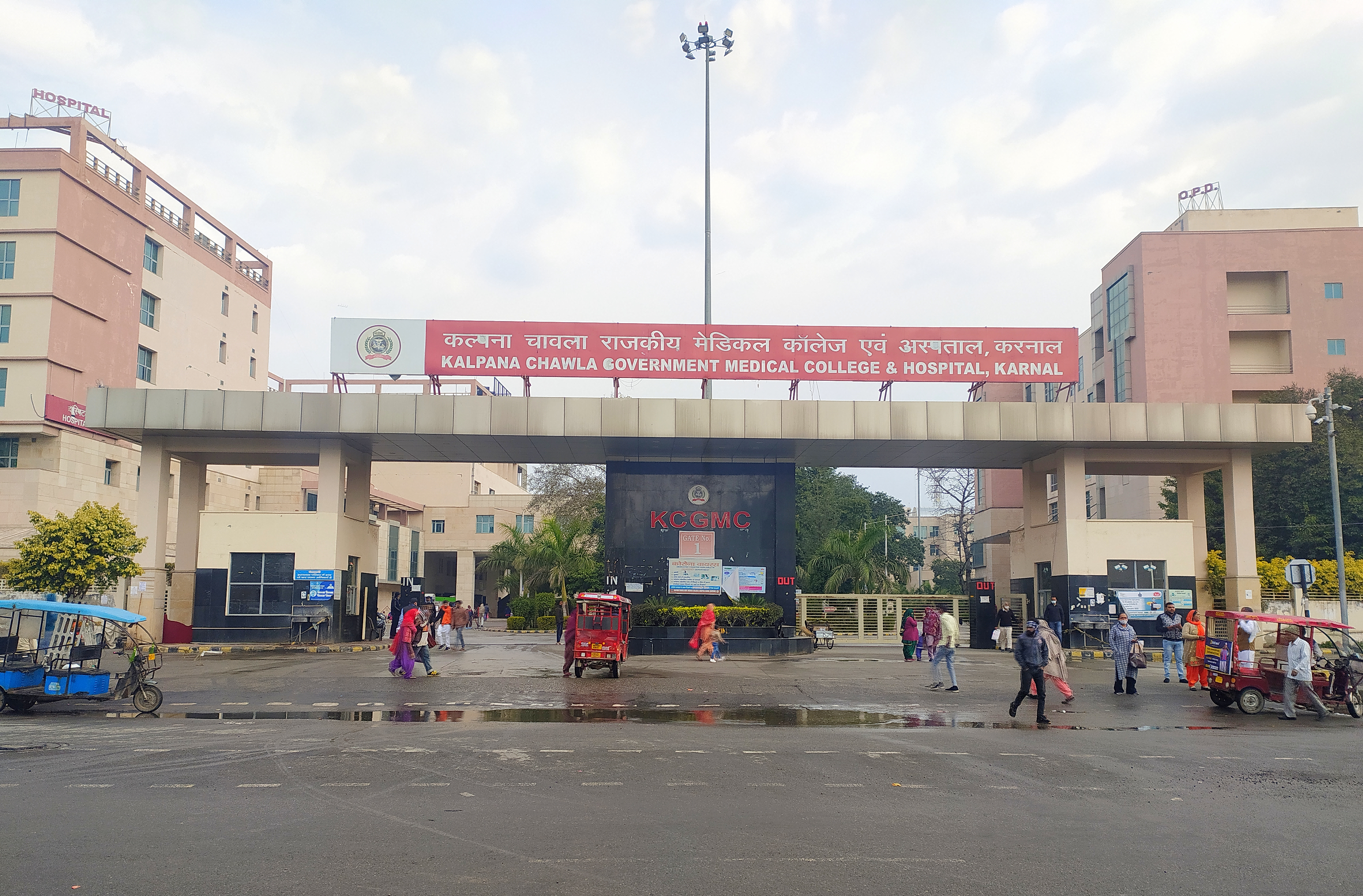
- Main Gate of KCGMCH
- Motto: सर्वे भवन्तु सुखिनः । सर्वे सन्तु निरामयाः (We Dare To Care)
- Type: Public
- Established: 2017; 9 years ago
- Affiliations: National Medical Commission
- Academic affiliations: Pandit Bhagwat Dayal Sharma University of Health Sciences
- Endowment: ₹11.24 billion (US$120 million) per annum
- Budget: ₹645.77 crore
- President: Minister of Health and Family Welfare, Government of Haryana
- Director: Dr. Mohinder Kumar Garg
- Location: Karnal, Haryana, India; 29°41′48.7″N 76°59′23.5″E
- Website: www.kcgmc.edu.in
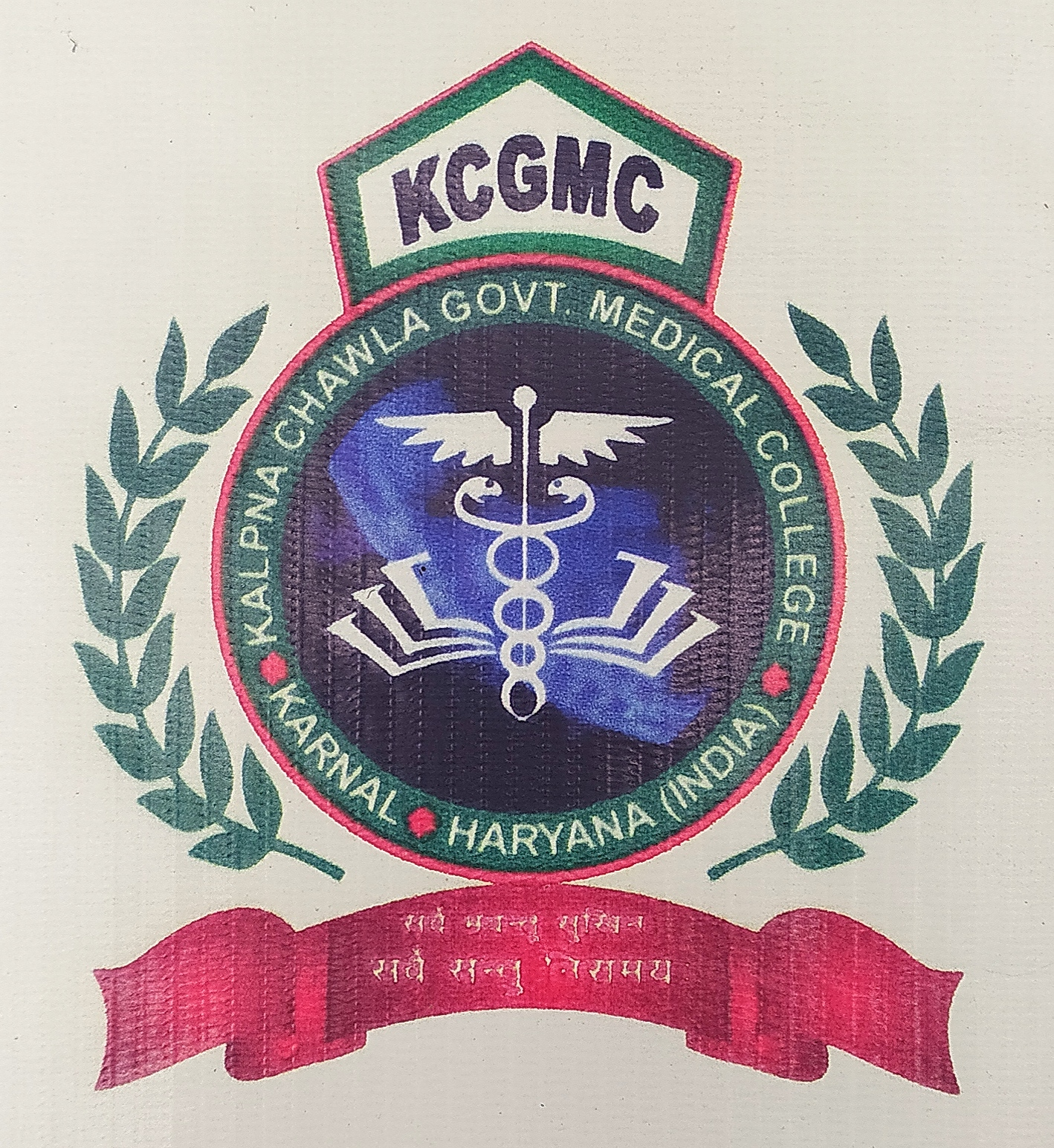

Kalpana Chawla Government Medical College (KCGMC) is a co-educational medical college located in Karnal, Haryana. It was established in 2017 and is named in the honor of Indian-American Astronaut Kalpana Chawla. KCGMC is affiliated to Pandit Bhagwat Dayal Sharma University of Health Sciences and is recognized by National Medical Commission (NMC) with an annual intake of 120 seats for MBBS.

== Infrastructure ==
Kalpana Chawla Government Medical College and Hospital is spread over an area of more than 50 acres in the city of Karnal, Haryana. The hospital has more than 300 beds which are projected to be increased to 700 in a phased manner. Additionally, it has state of the art equipments such as Computerized Radiography, CT Scan, Color Doppler, Automatic Cell Counters, Laparoscope, Operating Microscopes, laser, TURP, facilities, and fully functional biochemistry laboratory. The medical college building has all essential departments for 100 MBBS seats as per NMC guidelines including Preclinical, Para Clinical and Clinical Departments comprising demonstration rooms, museum, student laboratories and departmental library along with air conditioned central library and lecture theaters. There are separate hostels for boys and girls as well as residences for faculty and staff.

== History ==
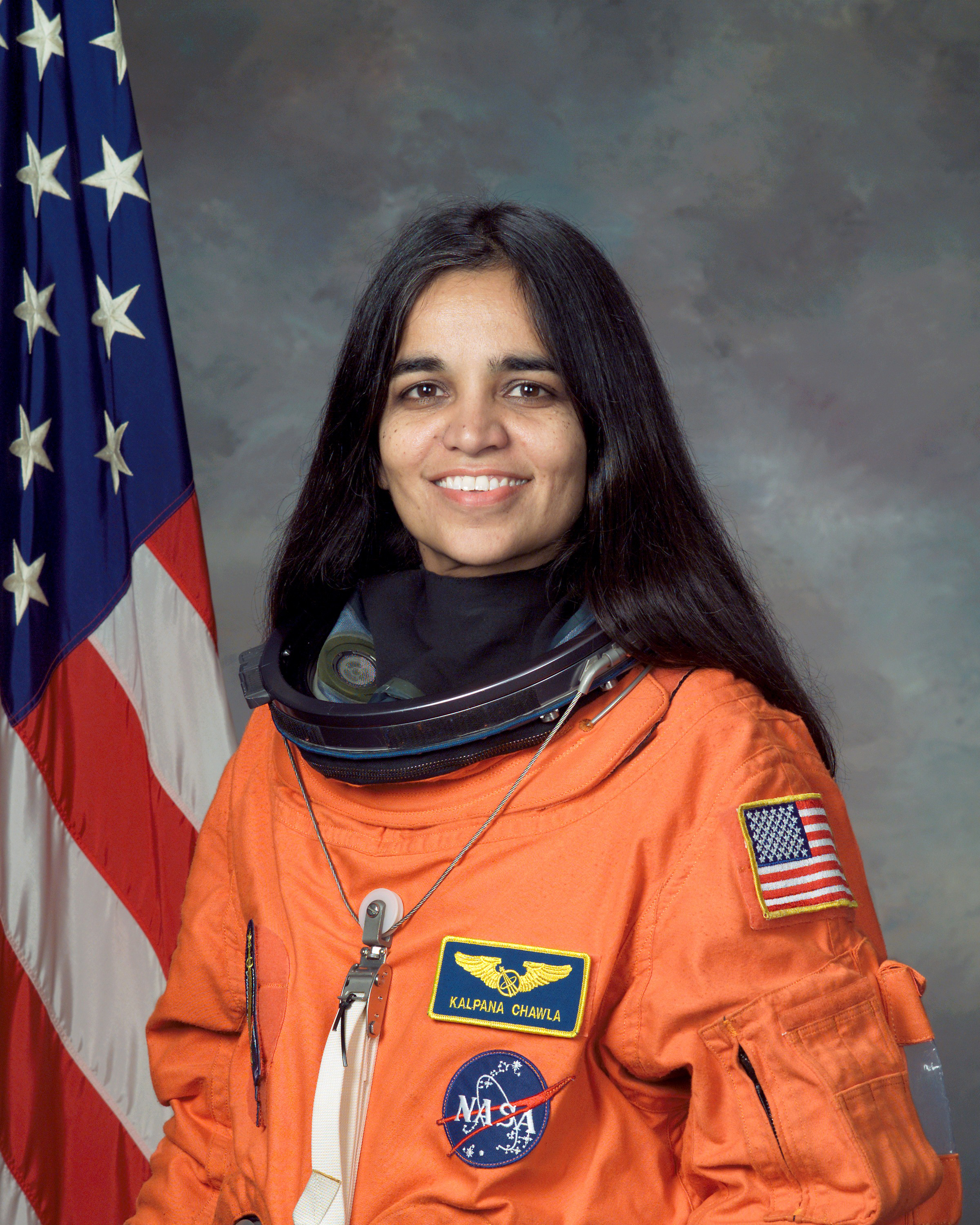
Kalpana Chawla, in whose honour the college is named

The construction of college campus and hospital began in late 2013 and was completed in 2017. It has a fully functional, state of the art outpatient department and hospital.

== Affiliation ==
The college is affiliated to Pandit Bhagwat Dayal Sharma University of Health Sciences, Rohtak, Haryana. Approved by NMC for intake of 120 MBBS students every year.

== Hospital ==
It is associated with Govt. Hospital, Karnal which serves as the teaching hospital.

Government of Haryana named the college in honour of the astronaut Kalpana Chawla.

== See also ==
- List of medical colleges in Haryana
- Pandit Deen Dayal Upadhayaya University of Health Sciences
