= Fatehpur, Kaithal =

Fatehpur
- village
- Location within Haryana Location within India
- Coordinates: 29°45′0″N 76°33′0″E
- Country: India
- State: Haryana
- District: Kaithal
- Tehsil: Pundri

Population (2011)
  - Total: 15,787
- Time zone: UTC+5:30 (IST)
- PIN: 136042.
- Telephone code: 01746
- ISO 3166 code: IN-HR
- Vehicle registration: HR-08
- Sex ratio: 820 ♂/♀
- Literacy: 73.44%
- Parliamentary constituency: Kaithal
- Assembly constituency: Pundri
- Website: haryana.gov.in

Fatehpur is a panchayat village in the Pundri tehsil of Kaithal district of Haryana, India. Earlier it formed part of the Kurukshetra and Karnal districts.

The population of Fatehpur village was 15,787 in 2011, which was almost five times the average size for villages in the district. The infrastructure is well-developed, including a nearby power station.

Fatehpur is famous for its Mata Devi shrine

The village is also known colloquially as Fatehpur-Pundri for the adjoining town of Pundri. Near by village Pundri Rural.

== Language ==
The native language of Fatehpur is Hindi, Haryanvi and most of the village people speak Hindi, Haryanvi. Fatehpur people use Hindi, Haryanvi language for communication.

== Education ==
Pundri has many schools and colleges. A government school that exists is called the Rural College of Agriculture

== Notables ==
- Dinesh Kaushik (politician), current MLA of Pundri Constituency and Brahmin leader of Haryana
