= Satpal Jamba =

Indian politician

Member of the Haryana Legislative Assembly
- Incumbent
- Assumed office 8 October 2024
- Preceded by: Randhir Singh Gollen
- Constituency: Pundri

Personal details
- Party: Bharatiya Janata Party
- Profession: Politician

Satpal Jamba or Satpal Kanyan from village Jamba is an Indian politician from Haryana. He is a Member of the Haryana Legislative Assembly from 2024, representing Pundri Assembly constituency as a Member of the Bharatiya Janata Party.

== See also ==
- 2024 Haryana Legislative Assembly election
- Haryana Legislative Assembly
