= Kalpana Chawla =

Indian-American astronaut (1962–2003)

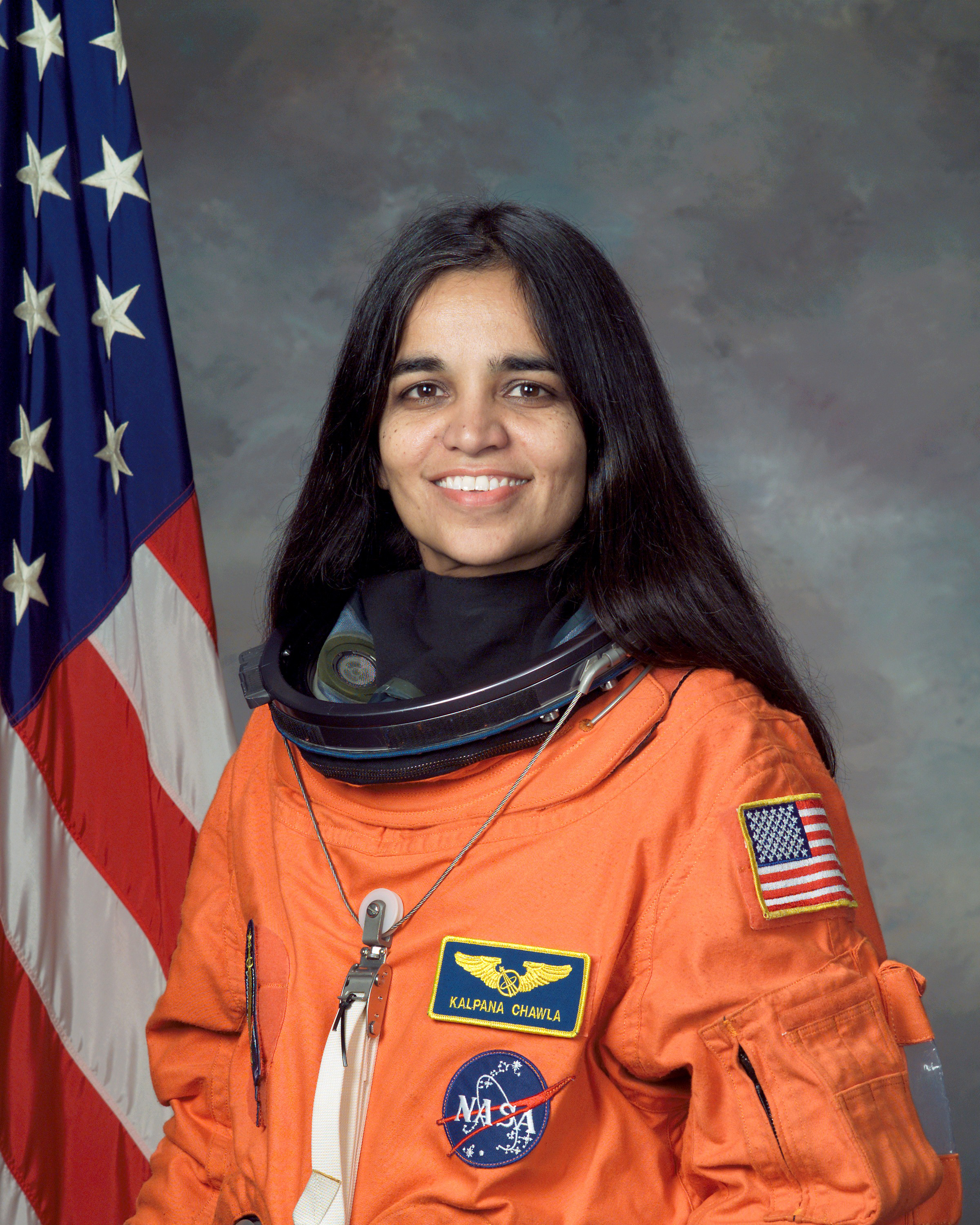
- Kalpana Chawla's NASA portrait taken on March 8, 2002
- Born: March 17, 1962; Karnal, Punjab
- Died: February 1, 2003 (aged 40); Over Texas, US
- Cause of death: Space Shuttle Columbia disaster
- Resting place: Zion National Park, Utah, US
- Education: Punjab Engineering College (BEng); University of Texas at Arlington (MS); University of Colorado Boulder (PhD)
- Awards: Congressional Space Medal of Honor; NASA Distinguished Service Medal; NASA Space Flight Medal
- Space career

NASA astronaut
- Time in space: 30d 14h 54m
- Selection: NASA Group 15 (1994)
- Mission: STS-87; STS-107
- Mission insignia

Kalpana Chawla (/ˌkɑːlpənə ˈtʃɑːvlə/; March 17, 1962 (Note: Some sources, such as Launius and Furuyama, report Chawla's birthdate as July 1, 1961. According to Jean-Pierre Harrison, Chawla's husband, Chawla used July 1 as her birth date to enroll in school a year earlier than when she otherwise would have. Other sources, such as Cavallaro, corroborate this story.) – February 1, 2003) was an Indian-born American astronaut, aerospace engineer, and pilot who was the first woman of Indian heritage to fly into space. Chawla participated in two spaceflights, STS-87 and STS-107, in 1997 and 2003, respectively. On both of these flights, she conducted scientific experiments researching the effects of microgravity on various physical processes. When the crew members in STS-107 descended back to Earth, the Space Shuttle Columbia disintegrated due to damage it sustained from liftoff. This killed all seven astronauts on board, including Chawla.

Chawla was born in Karnal, Haryana, India, to Banarsi Lal Chawla and Sanjyothi Chawla. She had three older siblings: Sunita, Dipa, and Sanjay Chawla. Chawla developed an interest in crewed flight after observing a plane passing over her at the age of three, deciding that she wanted to become an aerospace engineer at the age of 12. She attended Tagore Baal Niketan Senior Secondary School and, after graduating from there, Dayal Singh College. Despite opposition from her father, she transferred from the college to take engineering classes at Punjab Engineering College, from which she obtained a Bachelor of Engineering (BEng). She then emigrated to the United States, where she obtained her MSc from the University of Texas at Arlington (UTA) and her PhD from the University of Colorado Boulder (CU Boulder). While at CU Boulder, she obtained various pilot licenses, Instrument ratings, and flight instructor certificates. She became a naturalized US citizen in the early 1990s.

Chawla's professional career began when she was hired to work at NASA's Ames Research Center in 1988. There, she conducted research into computational fluid dynamics. She then joined Overset Methods, Inc., becoming the vice president of the organization in 1993. In 1994, she returned to NASA in the hopes of becoming an astronaut, undergoing a year of training before being assigned as a mission specialist and robotic arm operator in her first space mission, STS-87. Her performance in the mission caused some controversy due to the failed deployment of the Shuttle-Pointed Autonomous Research Tool for Astronomy (SPARTAN) module.

Chawla was posthumously awarded the Congressional Space Medal of Honor, the NASA Space Flight Medal, and the NASA Distinguished Service Medal. Several buildings, spacecraft, and extraterrestrial landmarks have been named in her honor. In addition, numerous documentaries and biographies have been written about both her life and the Columbia disaster she was in. Over the years, she has become a household name in India because of her ethnicity and achievements, with scholarships and awards being made in her honor, usually to promote female or Indian participation in space exploration.

== Early life and education ==
Kalpana Chawla was born on March 17, 1962, in Karnal, Haryana, India. Her father, Banarsi Lal Chawla, was the owner of a tire manufacturing plant. Her mother, Sanjogta Kharbanda, was the daughter of a doctor. Both of her parents were Punjabi Hindus who were originally from Gujranwala in West Punjab, having traveled to East Punjab as refugees during the Partition of India in 1947. She had three siblings: sisters Sunita and Dipa and brother Sanjay, of whom she was the youngest.

At the time of her birth, Chawla did not have a legal name. Although she was informally called "Montu" by her parents, it was not until she entered school that she chose her own name from a selection of names her parents presented to her. The name "Kalpana" translates to "idea" or "imagination", which was the reason she chose it. Relatives and friends often called her "KC", the initials of her first and last name.

As a child, she developed an interest in airplanes after seeing one at the age of three. At the age of 12, she decided that she wanted to become an aerospace engineer. However, this idea was dismissed by her father, who said that "only guys want to do [aerospace engineering]", instead recommending her to become a doctor or teacher. Despite this, she began specializing in science courses such as physics, chemistry, and mathematics at the Tagore Baal Niketan Senior Secondary School in Karnal, graduating in 1976 "near the top of her class."

In 1977, Chawla took a year of pre-university education at Kumari Vidyavati Anand DAV College for Women, also in Karnal. Afterward, she attended basic engineering courses at Dayal Singh College. Because there were no engineering colleges in her hometown, she then moved to Chandigarh to attend the aeronautical engineering school at Punjab Engineering College, where she studied the principles of theoretical aerodynamics. She was one of four women in the program and the first female student to take aerospace engineering classes at the college. However, some professors discouraged her from studying aerospace engineering, suggesting it was not suitable for women and advising her to study courses such as electrical engineering instead. She graduated from the college in 1982 with a Bachelor of Engineering.

Because she could not take further specialized aerospace engineering courses in India, Chawla traveled to the US to continue her education in 1982. She won a scholarship for University of Texas at Arlington (UTA), the college she was interested in, but required her father's permission before being allowed to attend. However, she again faced opposition from her father until he learned more about her accomplishments and aspirations, after which he conceded and helped her obtain an American visa to study at UTA. She earned her MSc from the university in 1984 with the thesis Optimization of cross flow fan housing for airplane wing installation. (Note: NASA says that she received her MSc from the "University of Texas", which is generally used to refer to the University of Texas at Austin, but most sources indicate that she attended the University of Texas at Arlington, which is also where her thesis was published.) She also met her husband, pilot Jean-Pierre Harrison, while at the school, and the two married on December 2, 1983.

Chawla then attended CU Boulder, where she first decided that she wanted to join the space program, receiving her PhD in 1988 with the thesis Computation of dynamics and control of unsteady vortical flows. While attending CU Boulder, Chawla began taking flying lessons at the Boulder Municipal Airport, eventually receiving commercial pilot licenses permitting her to fly various types of land and seaplanes, as well as gliders. She also received instrument ratings for airplanes and later became certified as a flight instructor for single-engine airplanes and flight instruments.

== Career ==
=== NASA ===
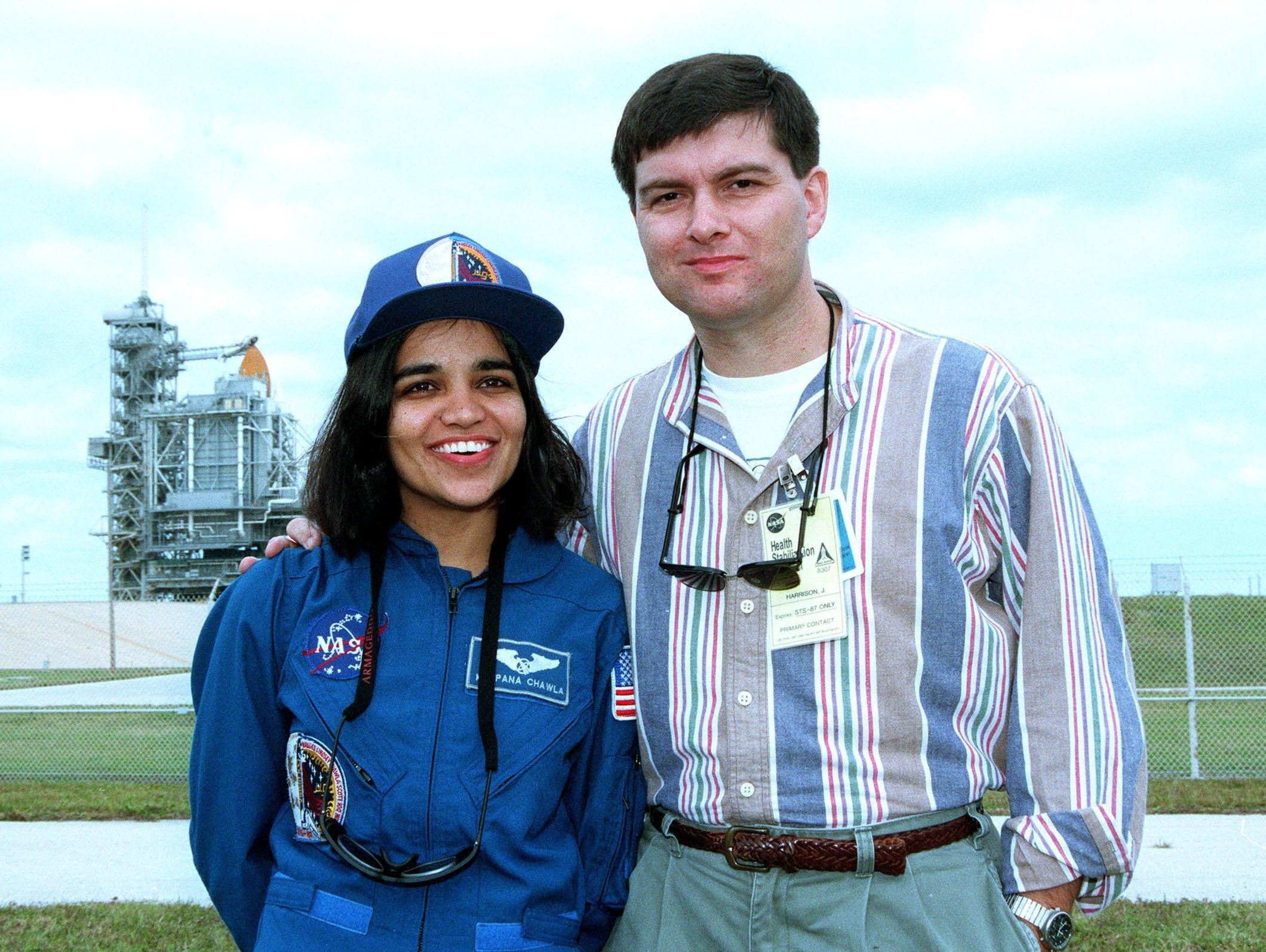
Chawla and her husband before the launch of STS-87

In 1988, Chawla began working at NASA's Ames Research Center, where she initially conducted computational fluid dynamics research on vertical and/or short take-off and landing (V/STOL) concepts. Her research there mostly focused on the simulation of air flow around aircraft such as the Harrier, with particular focus on the ground effect. She subsequently studied how to use multiple computers to solve fluid flow problems, testing these methods by calculating powered lift effects. Sometime in the early 1990s, she became a naturalized US citizen, a requirement for becoming a NASA astronaut. (Note: Chien says she was naturalized in 1990, while Jones and Cavallaro say she was naturalized in 1991.)

Chawla joined Overset Methods, Inc., a non-profit research organization based in Los Altos, California, as both a research scientist and the organization's vice president in 1993. Her work focused on simulating problems involving multiple moving objects and designing techniques to support aerodynamic optimization. In December 1994, she returned to NASA to undergo training as a candidate astronaut at the Johnson Space Center as part of NASA Astronaut Group 15. As part of this training, she attended classes in various sciences relevant to spaceflight, such as space medicine, planetary science, and materials science. She was also required to take classes teaching skills ranging from flying certain aircraft to parasail flight and scuba.

Eventually, she was eligible to work on technical assignments in office settings, which led up to assignments as a crew member in space shuttles. In 1995, she was assigned to the extravehicular activity and robotics divisions of the NASA Astronaut Corps. In the corps, she was made a crew representative to work on the technical issues that would arise in NASA's robotics. Most of her working time was spent in the Shuttle Avionics Integration Laboratory, where she developed Robotic Situational Awareness Displays and test space shuttle control software.

=== First space mission ===
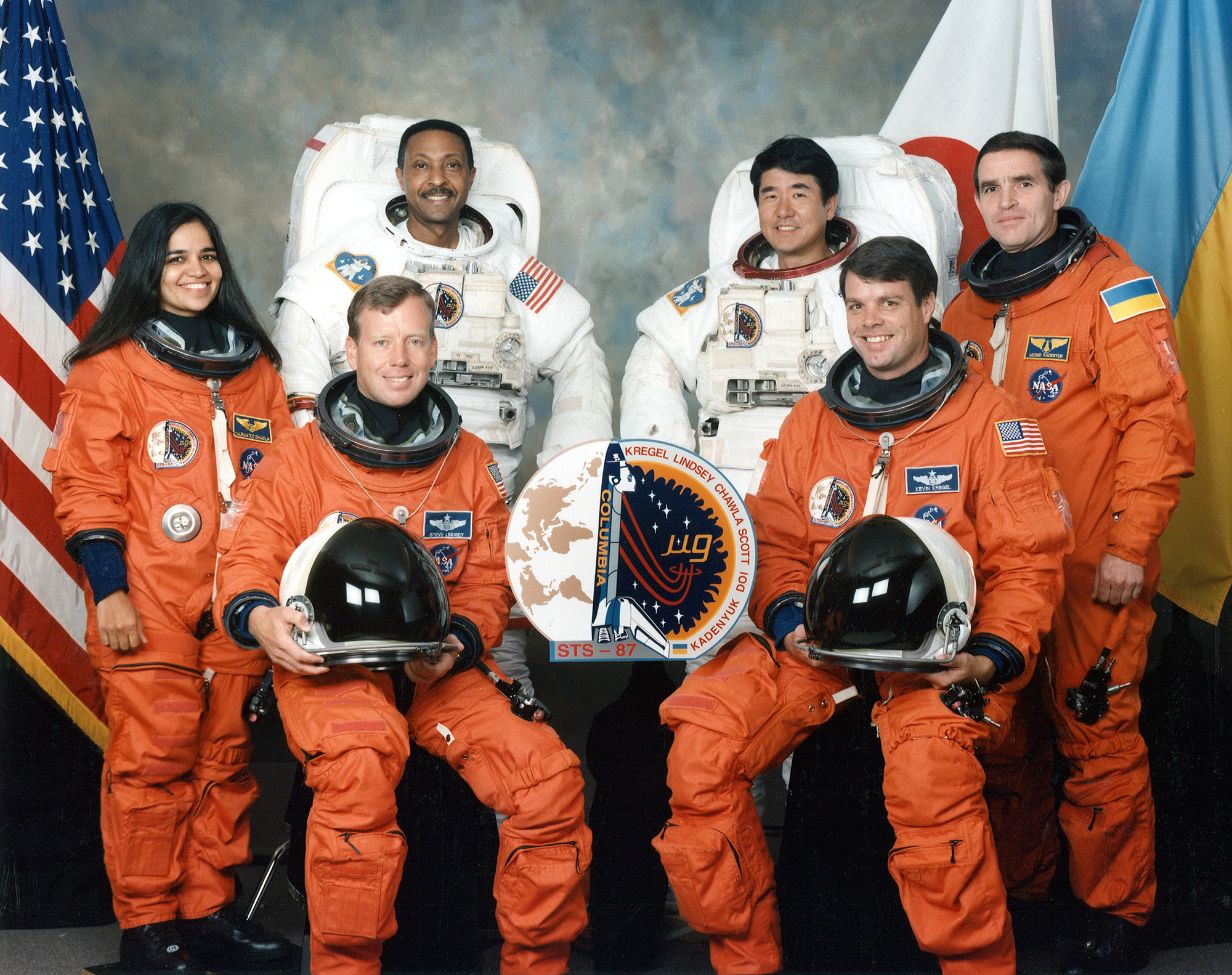
The crew of STS-87 in September 1997. From left to right, in orange: Chawla, Lindsey, Kregel, Kadeniuk; in white: Scott, Doi.

Chawla's first space mission began on November 19, 1997, as part of the six-astronaut crew that flew on the Space Shuttle Columbia flight STS-87. It was the fourth flight to hold the US Microgravity Payload (USMP-4) and Spartan 201 module, two of its payloads with which to conduct experiments on microgravity and the Sun's outer atmosphere, respectively. In the mission, Chawla served as a mission specialist, robotic arm operator, and backup flight engineer during liftoff. After STS-87 launched, Chawla became the first woman of Indian origin to go to space; Inder Kumar Gujral, the then prime minister of India, called her to congratulate her on her flight, expressing pride on behalf of the people of India and lauding Chawla for inspiring Indian women and children.

Chawla supervised and performed experiments in STS-87. As part of the mission, Chawla studied how to mix liquids evenly to create specific metal combinations that could be used in future computer chips. Using Columbia's Middeck Glovebox, she worked with immiscibles to understand the causes behind their separation.

Chawla was assigned to deploy the SPARTAN during the mission. Due to a power surge that damaged its control system, the SPARTAN failed to perform its expected pirouette movement minutes after she had deployed it. Chawla attempted to grapple the satellite with the shuttle's robotic arm but did not receive a clear signal on the control panel showing it was secured, causing her to move the arm back. In the process, she accidentally hit the SPARTAN, making it spin at two degrees per second. Fellow astronaut Kevin R. Kregel also attempted to grapple the payload by matching its spin with the shuttle's, but this movement was ultimately aborted. In the end, astronauts Winston E. Scott and Takao Doi performed a spacewalk to retrieve the payload.

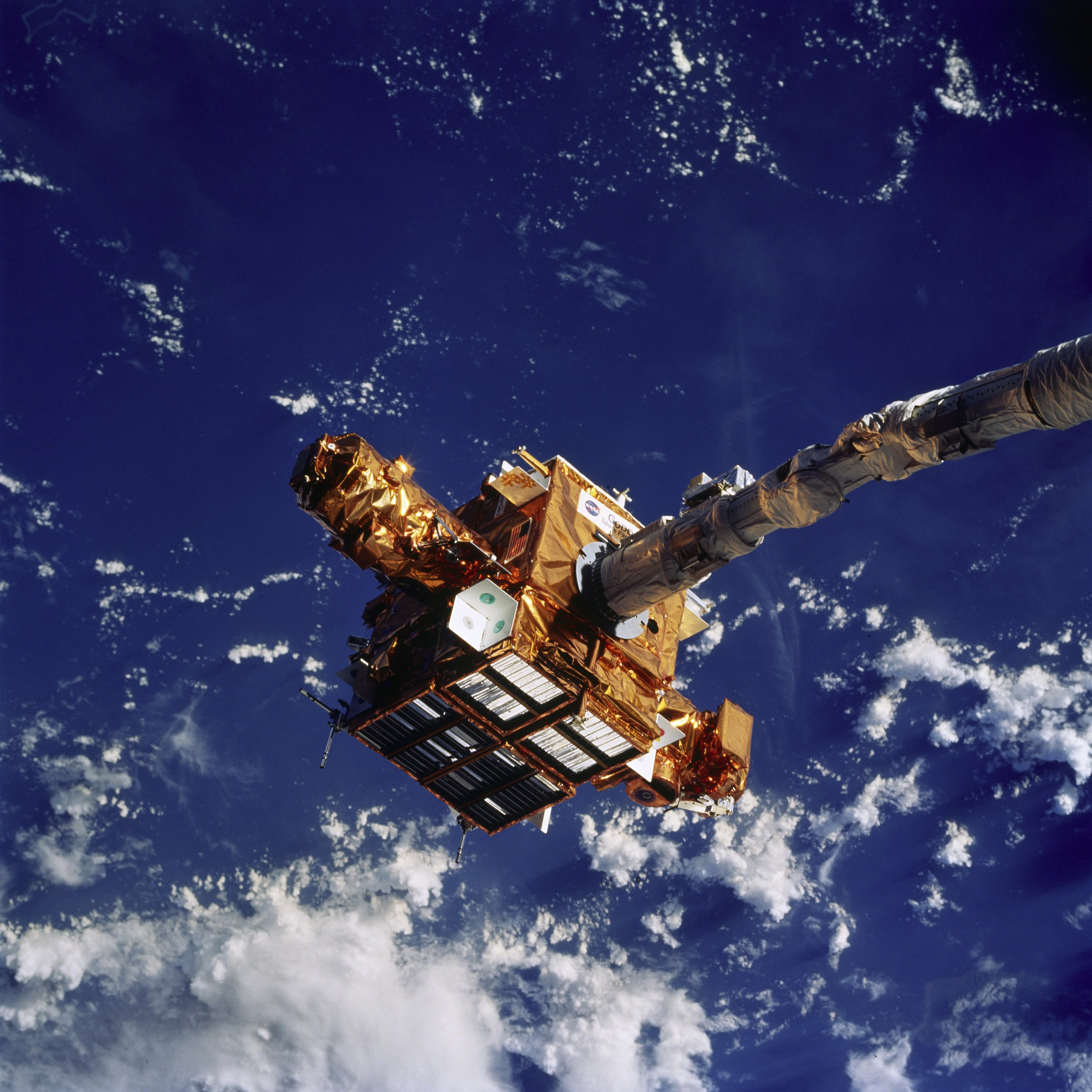
The deployment of the SPARTAN module

Some members of the press criticized Chawla for her handling of the SPARTAN payload, but Kregel refused to assign blame in an interview with the Orlando Sentinel:

We'd be very foolish if we tried to second-guess or tried to figure out what the actual turn of events were without having all the information... We're six folks up here; we know what happened on our side, we'll get together with the folks on the ground and we'll put the whole story together and make sure it never happens again. Sure, we're always a bit disappointed if we don't get the full mission accomplished, but we did retrieve the satellite, and so the important thing is we're bringing Spartan back down to Earth, and it'll get to fly another day.

NASA formed a team to investigate the deployment failure on December 4, 1997. The investigation initially attributed the failure to "crew error", but Chawla was ultimately exonerated, with the investigators citing insufficient training, errors in software interfaces, and poor communication with ground control as the causes of the incident. In all, by the end of the STS-87 mission on December 5, 1997, Chawla traveled 10.4 million miles in 252 orbits of the Earth, logging more than 376 hours (15 days and 16 hours) in space.

Chawla's spaceflight was widely reported around the world. She became especially well-known in India, with an image of her taken while she was in the shuttle being used as a cover image for The Week, an Indian news magazine and one of the largest published in English. In an interview with The New York Times, the head of the Washington office of the Indian Space Research Organization said that "After her first flight, she became a national hero."

After the mission, in January 1998, Chawla was assigned to be a crew representative for shuttle and station flight crew equipment. She was given a technical assignment advising shuttle engineers on different aspects of payload development and the astronaut experience. Soon after, she was selected to head the Astronaut Corps's Crew Systems and Habitability department.

=== Second space mission and death ===
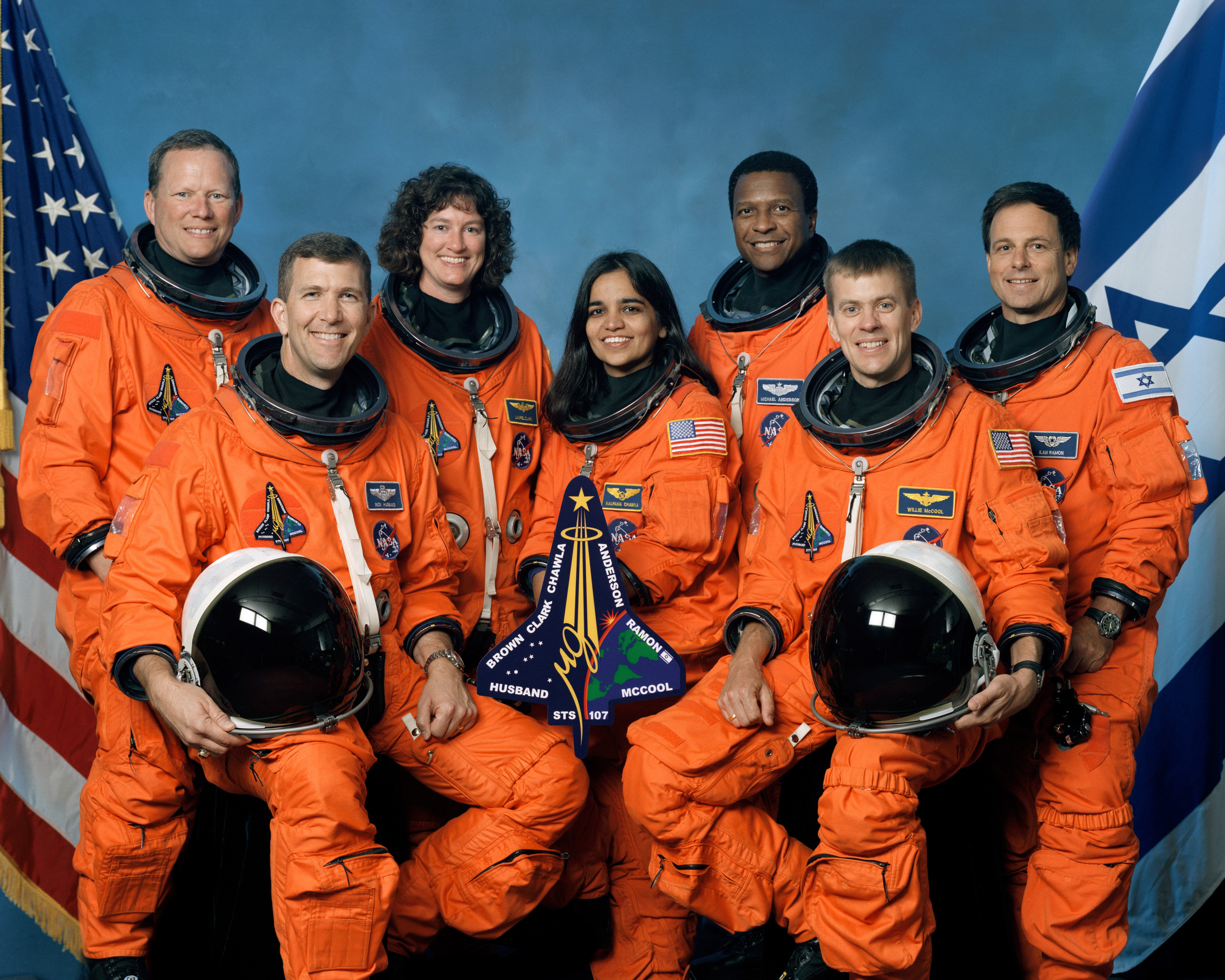
The crew of STS-107 in October 2001. From left to right: Brown, Husband, Clark, Chawla, Anderson, McCool, and Ramon.

On July 27, 2000, Chawla was selected for her second flight as part of the crew of STS-107. STS-107 was delayed 13 times over two years for a variety of reasons, including orbiter maintenance and the discovery of cracks in the shuttle engine flow liners on July 19, 2002. The mission finally launched on January 16, 2003. As the mission's flight engineer, she provided assistance to pilot William C. McCool during liftoff.

STS-107 was a multidisciplinary scientific mission modeled after the previous STS-90. The crew was assigned to two teams working in shifts to ensure that experiments were conducted nonstop. Chawla worked on the Red Team alongside fellow astronauts Ilan Ramon, Laurel Clark, and Rick Husband. She performed a variety of experiments while in orbit, researching astroculture and the effects of low gravity on the properties of combustion, crystal growth, cancer growth, granular materials, and mist. Other experiments included those to recycle water on the International Space Station, study the Sun, and analyze the behavior of insects and fish in space, the latter having been tested on behalf of the elementary students that created them. Overall, the crew of STS-107 performed over 80 experiments in various disciplines.

As the flight engineer, Chawla was tasked, alongside mission specialist Clark, with assessing the shuttle's system before re-entry on February 1. Columbia began re-entry at 8:44 a.m. on February 1. At 8:54 a.m, four sensors on the shuttle's wing failed, and at 9:00 a.m, the shuttle began disintegrating in the sky above Texas and Louisiana, killing all seven crew members aboard 16 minutes before they were due to land at the Kennedy Space Center in Florida. Following the incident, both NASA and various independent groups began investigating the cause of the disaster. For the next two years, NASA suspended all space flights while investigations were ongoing. In 2003, a report by the Columbia Accident Investigation Board found that a piece of insulating foam broke off from the shuttle's external tank during liftoff, striking the left wing of the orbiter. When Columbia began re-entry, hot gases entered the damaged wing, leading to the shuttle's destruction.

NASA established a team near Hemphill, Texas, to search for the remains of the crew. On February 4 or 5, NASA began transporting the recovered remains to the Armed Forces Institute of Pathology at Dover Air Force Base. (Note: Chien gives the date as February 5, while Leinbach & Ward give the date as February 4.) By February 11, all crew members' remains had been recovered, including Chawla's. A memorial service was held in Hemphill that afternoon. Chawla's remains were ultimately cremated and scattered at Zion National Park. Considering both her flight in STS-87 and STS-107, she logged a total of 30 days, 14 hours, and 54 minutes in space by the end of her career.

== Legacy ==
Chawla was the recipient of numerous posthumous honors. On February 3, 2003, it was announced that the girls' hostel at Punjab Engineering College, where Chawla obtained her BEng, would be named after her. A prize consisting of INR₹ 25,000, a medal, and a certificate was also created to reward the top students in the aeronautical engineering department. Also in February, the then prime minister of India, Atal Bihari Vajpayee, announced that the satellite MetSat-1 would be renamed to "Kalpana-1". Then, in August, the asteroid 51826 Kalpanachawla was named after her, one of seven asteroids named after the Columbia's crew. The Florida Institute of Technology named one of its residence buildings after Chawla in 2003 as part of "Columbia Village", which was dedicated to the seven Columbia astronauts. Steve Morse of the band Deep Purple released the song "Contact Lost" in 2003 in memory of the Columbia disaster.

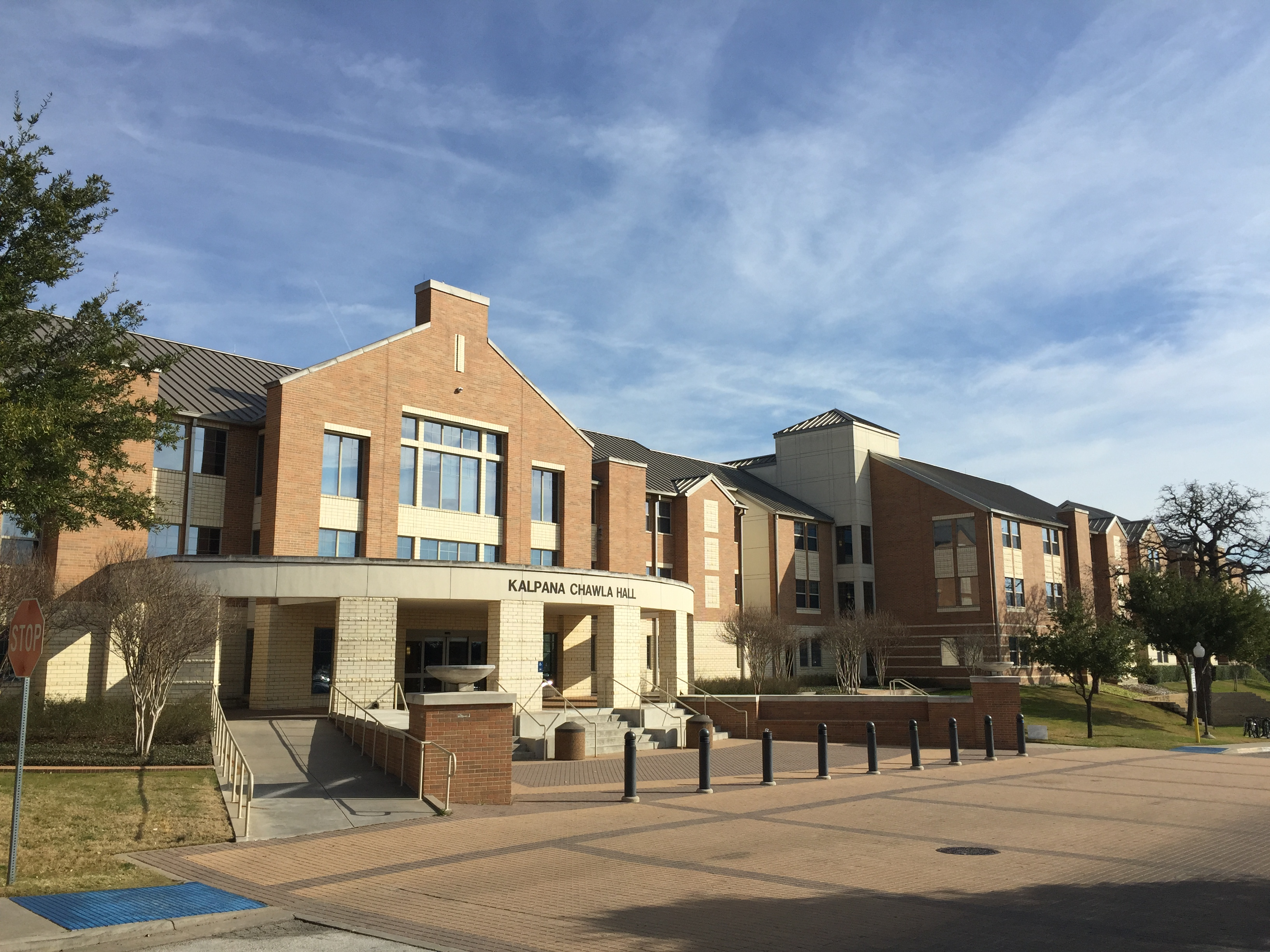
Kalpana Chawla Hall, University of Texas at Arlington

In 2003, 74th Street in Queens, New York City, was named "Kalpana Chawla Way" after her. Another street, Kalpana Chawla Street, was also named after her, located in Coimbatore, Tamil Nadu, India. The following year, NASA named a supercomputer after her, Kalpana. Also in 2004, the Indian Institute of Technology, Kharagpur, named the Kalpana Chawla Space Technology Cell after her. Seven peaks in the Columbia Hills on Mars were named after the Columbia astronauts on February 2, 2004, with one of them being named after Chawla. Two days later, on February 4, Chawla was posthumously awarded the Congressional Space Medal of Honor by President George W. Bush. She was also awarded the NASA Space Flight Medal and the NASA Distinguished Service Medal. In March, the Government of Karnataka instituted the "Kalpana Chawla Award" to recognize young female scientists. Then, in September, UTA, where Chawla obtained her MSc in 1984, opened "Kalpana Chawla Hall", also called "KC Hall". The lunar crater "Chawla" was named after her in 2006. The Kalpana Chawla Planetarium in Haryana was also dedicated to her in 2007. Novelist Peter David named a shuttlecraft, the Chawla, after her in his 2007 Star Trek novel, Star Trek: The Next Generation: Before Dishonor.

In 2010, a memorial display was dedicated to Chawla in UTA's Nedderman Hall. That same year, the Kalpana Chawla ISU Scholarship was founded to support Indian women in space education. In 2011, Chalwa's husband published a biography on her titled The Edge of Time. In 2017, the Kalpana Chawla Government Medical College was established in Karnal. Then, in 2020, she became the focus of the second season of the National Geographic India documentary series Mega Icons alongside musician A. R. Rahman, actress Deepika Padukone, and industrialist Ratan Tata. The fourteenth contracted Northrop Grumman Cygnus spacecraft mission, which was launched in October 2020 to deliver supplies to the International Space Station, was named the S.S. Kalpana Chawla in her honor. On April 1, 2022, a satellite nicknamed after Chawla was launched into space: ÑuSat 24, COSPAR 2022-033X. Finally, a fictionalized version of Chawla appears in the 2023 movie A Million Miles Away, where she is played by actress Sarayu Blue.

== See also ==
- List of Asian Americans § Space
- List of women astronauts
- List of Indian astronauts

== Sources ==
- Crespo, Dominique (December 9, 2024). "30 Years Ago: NASA Selects its 15th Group of Astronauts – NASA". NASA.
- Brownstoner (June 24, 2013). "A Walk Down Kalpana Chawla Way". www.brownstoner.com.
- Biographical Data – Kalpana Chawla (Ph.D.) (PDF) (Report). NASA. 2004.
- Britannica (March 13, 2026). "Kalpana Chawla". Britannica.
- Cavallaro, Umberto (2023). To the Stars: Women Spacefarers' Legacy. Cham: Springer. ISBN 978-3-031-19859-5.
- Chawla, Kalpana (1984). Computation of dynamics and control of unsteady vortical flows (Masters thesis). University of Texas at Arlington. OCLC 12319243.
- Chawla, Kalpana (1988). Optimization of cross flow fan housing for airplane wing installation (PhD thesis). University of Colorado Boulder. OCLC 8902887.
- Chien, Philip (2006). Columbia: Final Voyage. New York: Springer Science & Business Media. ISBN 978-0-387-27148-4.
- Christiaens, Kris (September 27, 2023). "ÑuSat (Satellogic)". FutureSpaceFlight.
- "Congressional Space Medal of Honor". NASA. 2023.
- David, Peter (2007). Star Trek: The Next Generation: Before Dishonor. New York: Pocket Books/Star Trek. ISBN 978-1-416-52742-8. OCLC 181644183.
- "Deepika, Rahman to feature in Mega Icons Season 2". The Indian Express. 2020.
- "Deep Purple remembers shuttle astronaut". UPI. 2003.
- Encyclopedia.com (n.d.). "Chawla, Kalpana". Encyclopedia.com.
- de León, Concepción (2023). "'A Million Miles Away:' From the fields to outer space". Sonoma Index-Tribune.
- Dismukes, Kim (2009). "Kalpana Chawla – STS-107 Crew Memorial". NASA. Archived from the original on November 6, 2004.
- Evans, Ben (2005). Space Shuttle Columbia: Her Missions and Crews. Berlin: Springer Science & Business Media. ISBN 0-387-21517-4.
- "Florida Tech to Dedicate Residence Hall Complex in Memory of Columbia". Florida Tech News. 2003.
- Furniss, Tim (April 29, 1998). "Columbia crew is blamed for Spartan deployment failure". Flight Global.
- Garber, Megan (February 1, 2013). "Columbia's Astronauts, Remembered on Mars". The Atlantic.
- Gehman Jr., Harold; et al. (2003). Columbia Accident Investigation Board – Report (PDF) (Report). Vol. 1. NASA.
- Gohd, Chelsea (2020). "Antares rocket launches new astronaut toilet and more to space station for NASA". Space.com.
- Gupta, Shobhit (2023). "Remembering Kalpana Chawla: First Indian-born American woman to go to space". Hindustan Times.
- Sethulekshmi, M S (March 9, 2022). "More women in STEM but not enough". Deccan Herald.
- Mewhinney, Michael (May 10, 2004). "NASA to Name Supercomputer After Columbia Astronaut". NASA Advanced Supercomputing Division. Archived from the original on August 25, 2019.
- Harrison, Jean-Pierre (2011). The Edge of Time: the authoritative biography of Kalpana Chawla. Los Gatos: Harrison Publishing. ISBN 978-0-976-82790-0. OCLC 885972649.
- Harvey, Ailsa; Tillman, Nola (February 10, 2022). "Kalpana Chawla: Biography & Columbia Disaster". Space.
- "KCGMC-Kalpana Chawla Government Medical College, Karnal, Haryana". www.kcgmc.edu.in. n.d.
- Hess, Mark; Campion, Ed; Herring, Kyle (1994). "1995 Astronaut Candidates Selected" (TXT). NASA News. NASA. Archived from the original on May 10, 2021.
- International Institute of Buffalo (May 9, 2023). "Asian American and Pacific Islander Heritage Month: Kalpana Chawla". International Institute of Buffalo.
- Indian Institute of Technology (n.d.). "Indian Institute of Technology Kharagpur". www.iitkgp.ac.in.
- Jones, Mykah (2020). "Chawla, Kalpana". Texas State Historical Association.
- "KALPANA-1 Introduction". Meteorological & Oceanographic Satellite Data Archival Centre (MOSDAC). n.d.
- "Kalpana Chawla Award instituted". The Hindu. Chennai. 2004. Archived from the original on July 13, 2004.
- Ashsan, Sadaf (February 1, 2023). "Kalpana Chawla, First Indian American Woman in Space". The Juggernaut.
- "Kalpana Chawla Memorial Display". Kalpana Chawla Memorial Display – College of Engineering – The University of Texas at Arlington. n.d.
- "Kalpana Chawla Planetarium(Kurukshetra)". Haryana Government. n.d. Archived from the original on November 10, 2025.
- Launius, Roger D. (2008). "Columbia Space Shuttle Crew". American National Biography Online. Oxford University Press. doi:10.1093/anb/9780198606697.article.2001896. ISBN 978-0-198-60669-7.
- Leinbach, Michael; Ward, Jonathan H. (2020). Bringing Columbia Home: The Untold Story of a Lost Space Shuttle and Her Crew. New York: Arcade. ISBN 978-1-948-92461-0.
- "The Moon and music". Royal Museums Greenwich.
- "Moon - Chawla". Gazetteer of Planetary Nomenclature. USGS. 2010.
- MRUC (2014). "Indian Readership Survey 2014" (PDF). MRUC.
- "Dr. Kalpana Chawla Scholar – Graduates the International Space University at Rice University & Johnson Space Center". EIN Presswire. September 16, 2024.
- Orloff, Richard, ed. (n.d.). "Space Shuttle Mission STS-87" (PDF).
- Padmanabhan, Anil (2003). Kalpana Chawla, a Life. New Delhi; New York: Penguin Books India. ISBN 0-14-333586-3.
- Pearlman, Robert Z. (2020). "Cargo spacecraft named for fallen NASA astronaut Kalpana Chawla". Space.com.
- Polgreen, Lydia (February 1, 2003). "Dr. Kalpana Chawla: Quiet and Modest, but Also Determined". The New York Times. ISSN 0362-4331.
- "Punjab Engineering College remembers Kalpana". The Indian Express. Archived from the original on August 27, 2006.
- Shayler, David J.; Moule, Ian A. (2005). Women in Space – Following Valentina. Berlin; New York; Chichester: Springer Science & Business Media. ISBN 1-85233-744-3.
- "STS-87". NASA. n.d.
- Times of India (November 24, 2003). "NY road named after Kalpana Chawla". The Times of India. ISSN 0971-8257.
- Satellogic (April 4, 2022). "Satellogic Launches Five Additional Satellites on SpaceX Transporter-4 Mission". Satellogic.
- Uri, John (2023). "20 Years Ago: Remembering Columbia and Her Crew". NASA.
- Wong, Esther (2004). "Kalpana Chawla Hall dedicated". The Shorthorn.
- Yang, John; Zahn, Harry; Merchant, Azhar (May 14, 2023). "Remembering Kalpana Chawla, the first Indian American to go to space". PBS.
- Zhao, Xiaojian; Park, Edward J.W., eds. (2013). Asian Americans: An Encyclopedia of Social, Cultural, Economic, and Political History. Santa Barbara.: ABC-CLIO. ISBN 978-1-59884-240-1.
  - Furuyama, Katie. "Chawla, Kalpana (1961-2003)". In Zhao & Park (2013).
