= Pandit Deen Dayal Upadhayaya University of Health Sciences =

University teaching hospital in Haryana, India

Pandit Deen Dayal Upadhayaya University of Health Sciences, Karnal
- Former names: University of Health Sciences, Karnal (2016–2018)
- Motto: सर्वे भवन्तु सुखिनः । सर्वे सन्तु निरामयाः
- Type: Teaching tertiary care general hospital
- Established: 2016; 10 years ago
- Academic affiliations: National Medical Commission
- Endowment: ₹11.24 billion (US$120 million) per annum
- Budget: ₹645.77 crore
- Chancellor: Governor of Haryana
- Vice-Chancellor: Dr. Vikas Bhatia
- President: Minister for Health and Family Welfare, Government of Haryana
- Location: Karnal, Haryana, India; 29°37′07″N 77°00′55″E
- Campus: 100 acres (40 ha)
- Website: Official Website

Pandit Deen Dayal Upadhayaya University of Health Sciences, Karnal is a university specialised in health sciences in Karnal, Haryana, India. It was established by Haryana Act No. 27 of 2016 and named University of Health Sciences, Karnal which was changed into Pandit Deen Dayal Upadhayaya University of Health Sciences, Karnal by an amendment act passed in 2018.

== History ==
The concept of the University of Health Sciences at Kutail, Karnal, Haryana was introduced in 2016. After the Department of Medical Education and Research, Haryana proposed the idea of university at Kutail, the university was approved by Manohar Lal Khattar, the then Chief Minister of Haryana along with Haryana Cabinet. The announcement was made by Chief Minister while addressing the press at Kalpana Chawla Government Medical College. Government of Haryana sought help of Bloomberg School of Public Health at Johns Hopkins University in the United States to set up the University of Health Sciences in Kutail, Karnal, Haryana. The Kalpana Chawla Government Medical College is thus the mother institution of University of Health Sciences.

== Campus ==
The 178-acre (72 ha) campus near Grand Trunk Road is located on the 99 years long land leased by the Kutail village at the rate of Rs 1 per acre to the Medical Education and Research Department, Haryana.

== Admission ==
The university commenced running classes for the 44 BSc Nursing and 30 BSc Physiotherapy students in November 2018, initially from the campus of the KCGMCH while the university buildings

constructed.[6]

== See also ==
- Similar institutes
  - All India Institutes of Medical Sciences
  - AIIMS, Badsa (Jhajjar)
  - Pandit Bhagwat Dayal Sharma Post Graduate Institute of Medical Sciences, Rohtak
  - List of institutions of higher education in Haryana
  - List of medical colleges in India
- Related health topics
  - Healthcare in India
  - Indian states ranking by institutional delivery
  - List of hospitals in India
