= Mehmadpur, Karnal =

Mehmadpur
- Village
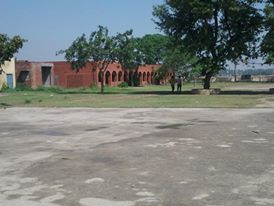
- Govt. School's Play Ground

- Location within Haryana Location within India
- Coordinates: 29.719607°N 77.095528°E
- Country: India
- State: Haryana
- District: Karnal
- Tehsil: Karnal
- Assembly Constituency: Gharaunda

Government
  - Sarpanch: Mrs. Shimla Devi

Population (2011)
  - Total: 2,500

Languages
  - Official: Hindi
- Time zone: UTC+5:30 (IST)
- PIN: 132022
- Area code: 0184
- ISO 3166 code: IN-HR
- Vehicle registration: HR-05
- Website: haryana.gov.in

Mehmadpur is a village on the banks of the Yamuna River, off the Grand Trunk Road that runs from Amritsar to Delhi and further on to Kolkata.It is village of Brahman and Ror communities. Writer Mohit Kaushik born in this village.

== Overview ==
Mehmadpur is located in Karnal, India. It is located 9 kilometres (5.6 mi) from Karnal Grand Trunk Road. The village has a history of more than 200 years and was also known as Mahadevpur (Hindi: महादॆवपुर) . This is a big village with a population of over 2,500. There are two schools, two Choupals and a Shiv Mandir in the village.

The main profession of its residents is agriculture. Most of the agricultural land is owned by RORs. The soil is alluvial in nature and the Yamuna River is not too far, thus, irrigation is not an issue for the farmers and they are easily able to harvest more than two crops a year. The literacy rate is more than 70%, and few people are in government jobs. In the village, Ror community (Hindi: रॊड) is large in strength but you will found there around 8 communities. The population mainly consists of Hindus only RORs along with Brahmin and Dalits.

The village has its own Panchayat which was recently elected. This consists of Ten Panchayat members and a Sarpanch. The current Sarpanch of the village is Mrs. shimla devi. Until recently it was lacking all the basic needs but it has shown a good development progress under former Sarpanch Late Sh Arjun Singh Namberdar.Sh. Arjun Singh did a lot in his tenure for the three consecutive plans for the welfare of the villagers. Now the village has all basic facilities like good transportation links, good water supply, clean streets with street lights. A Government High School was established in 1954 and was the only High School in the nearby area. The village also has a Senior Secondary School which is the only Senior Secondary School where students comes from several nearby villages.

The village also has a Co-Operative Society, a distributor of seeds, pesticides and fertilizers to the farmers of the nearby villages.

This village has also shown good progress in education, students have started to go abroad for higher studies as well.
