= North American Association of Indian Students =

Indian-American nonprofit organisation

North American Association of Indian Students (NAAIS)
- Founded: 2020
- Founder: Sudhanshu Kaushik
- Type: Nonprofit organization
- Legal status: 501(c)(3)
- Purpose: Students, youth, activism, mobilization
- Location: New York / Delhi
- Members: 23,000
- Website: naais.org

The North American Association of Indian Students (NAAIS) is an American nonprofit organization that supports Indian and Indian-American students studying in the United States. The organization aims to connect a variety of Indian groups on college and university campuses to create better resources for Indian and Indian-American students.

With over 200,000 Indian students and over 500,000 Indian-American students studying in US institutions, young Indians are one of the largest identity groups within the United States, second only to the Chinese.

NAAIS runs a workshop series to encourage bonding between Indian-origin students. Additionally, NAAIS runs a mentorship program "designed to facilitate connections between undergraduate students of Indian origin, including Indian-American students, and experienced Indian alumni mentors". In 2001, NAAIS also partnered with ZEE5, an Indian video-on-demand service, to get its message to more young Indians around college campuses, having visited over 50 college campuses in the United States by November that year.
