= Mehmadpur, Fatehgarh Sahib =

Mehmadpur
- village
- Location in Punjab, India Mehmadpur (India)
- Coordinates: 30.45°N 76.26°E
- Country: India
- State: Punjab
- District: Fatehgarh Sahib

Area
  - Total: 12 km^{2} (4.6 sq mi)

Population (2011)
  - Total: 1,500
  - Density: 120/km^{2} (320/sq mi)

Languages
  - Official: Punjabi
- Time zone: UTC+5:30 (IST)
- Telephone code: 01763
- Vehicle registration: PB23
- Nearest city: Sirhind
- Literacy: 23%%
- Lok Sabha constituency: Fatehgarh Sahib
- Vidhan Sabha constituency: Sirhind

Mehmadpur (Village ID 32587) is a village in Punjab, India. It is located 8 km from Fatehgarh Sahib on the Sirhind - Chandigarh road near Badali Ala Singh village. Mehmadpur is a big village with a population of over 1500. There are two schools and two gurudwaras. According to the 2011 census it has a population of 579 living in 108 households. Its main agriculture product is wheat growing.

The main profession of people is agriculture. The literacy rate is medium, and few people are in government jobs. The population mainly consists of Sikhs and Hindus, with couple of Muslims families.

The village has its own Panchayat which was recently elected by consensus. This consists of five Panchayat members and a Sarpanch. The village lacks many basic facilities like good transportation. Now the condition of roads and streets is not good because of big problem of sewage water. middle standard school.
