= Mehmudpur, SBS Nagar =

Mehmudpur
- Village
- Location in Punjab, India Mehmudpur (India)
- Coordinates: 31.0966063°N 76.0044467°E
- Country: India
- State: Punjab
- District: Shaheed Bhagat Singh Nagar

Government
  - Type: Panchayat raj
  - Body: Gram panchayat
- Elevation: 254 m (833 ft)

Population (2011)
  - Total: 921
- Sex ratio 462/459 ♂/♀

Languages
  - Official: Punjabi
- Time zone: UTC+5:30 (IST)
- PIN: 144421
- Telephone code: 01823
- ISO 3166 code: IN-PB
- Post office: Mehmoodpur (B.O)
- Website: nawanshahr.nic.in

Mehmudpur is a village in Shaheed Bhagat Singh Nagar district of Punjab State, India. It is located 11 kilometres (6.8 mi) away from Banga, 13 kilometres (8.1 mi) from Nawanshahr, 5.4 kilometres (3.4 mi) from district headquarter Shaheed Bhagat Singh Nagar and 104 kilometres (65 mi) from state capital Chandigarh. The village is administrated by Sarpanch an elected representative of the village.

== Demography ==
As of 2011, Mehmudpur has a total number of 201 houses and population of 921 of which 462 include are males while 459 are females according to the report published by Census India in 2011. The literacy rate of Mehmudpur is 80.14% higher than the state average of 75.84%. The population of children under the age of 6 years is 80 which is 8.69% of total population of Mehmudpur, and child sex ratio is approximately 12.07 as compared to Punjab state average of 846.

Most of the people are from Schedule Caste which constitutes 48.32% of total population in Mehmudpur. The town does not have any Schedule Tribe population so far.

As per the report published by Census India in 2011, 460 people were engaged in work activities out of the total population of Mehmudpur which includes 282 males and 178 females. According to census survey report 2011, 97.39% workers describe their work as main work and 2.61% workers are involved in Marginal activity providing livelihood for less than 6 months.

== Education ==
Amardeep Singh Shergill Memorial college Mukandpur, KC Engineering College and Doaba Khalsa Trust Group Of Institutions are the nearest colleges. Industrial Training Institute for women (ITI Nawanshahr) is 15.5 kilometres (9.6 mi). The village is 81 kilometres (50 mi) away from Chandigarh University, 62 kilometres (39 mi) from Indian Institute of Technology and 40 kilometres (25 mi) away from Lovely Professional University.

List of schools nearby:

- Govt Senior Secondary School, Ladhana Jhikka
- Dashmesh Model School, Kahma
- Govt High School, Jhander Kalan
- Govt Gigh School, Khan Khana
- Guru Ram Dass Public School, Cheta

== Transport ==
Nawanshahr train station is the nearest train station however, Garhshankar Junction railway station is 26 kilometres (16 mi) away from the village. Sahnewal Airport is the nearest domestic airport which located 55 kilometres (34 mi) away in Ludhiana and the nearest international airport is located in Chandigarh also Sri Guru Ram Dass Jee International Airport is the second nearest airport which is 150 kilometres (93 mi) away in Amritsar.

== See also ==
- List of villages in India
