= Sudhanshu Kaushik =

Indian American youth rights activist and commentator (born 1995)

- Born: 13 April 1995 (age 31); Opelika, Alabama, U.S.
- Education: New York University (BA); Columbia University (MA); University of Oxford (MS); University of Chicago (MBA)
- Occupations: Youth rights activist, political commentator, journalist, writer
- Years active: 2015–present
- Known for: Young India Foundation; North American Association of Indian Students
- Honours: Gallatin Global Fellowship in Human Rights; Fellow of the South Asian Journalists Association

Sudhanshu Kaushik (born 13 April 1995) is an Indian American youth rights advocate and writer. He is the founder of the Young India Foundation, established in 2015 to promote youth participation in Indian politics, and the North American Association of Indian Students, launched in 2020 to support India–United States relations.

== Biography ==
Born to politician Dinesh Kaushik, he spent his youth between Haryana, India, and Alabama, USA. He has spoken publicly about the racism he encountered during his upbringing in Alabama.

Kaushik pursued higher education at New York University, Columbia University, and the University of Oxford. His professional experience includes work with the Permanent Mission of India to the United Nations and as a journalist at CNN under Fareed Zakaria. In 2015, he was recognized in the International Literacy Association’s inaugural 30 Under 30 list. He has also been a Gallatin Global Fellow in Human Rights and a fellow of the South Asian Journalists Association. In December 2023, Kaushik published The Future Is Ours: The Political Promise of India’s Youth with HarperCollins India.

== Published works ==
- The Future Is Ours: The Political Promise of India's Youth. Gurugram: HarperCollins India. 22 December 2023. ISBN 978-93-5699-589-5. OCLC 1414164983.
