= Mehmadpur, Bhulath =

Mehmadpur
- Village
- Location in Punjab, India Mehmadpur (India)
- Coordinates: 31.371480°N 75.393681°E
- Country: India
- State: Punjab
- District: Kapurthala

Government
  - Type: Panchayati raj (India)
  - Body: Gram panchayat

Population (2011)
  - Total: 641
- Sex ratio 299/342♂/♀

Languages
  - Official: Punjabi
  - Other spoken: Hindi
- Time zone: UTC+5:30 (IST)
- PIN: 144401
- Telephone code: 01822
- ISO 3166 code: IN-PB
- Vehicle registration: PB-09
- Website: kapurthala.gov.in

Mehmadpur is a village in Bhulath Tehsil in Kapurthala district of Punjab State, India. It is located 6 kilometres (3.7 mi) from Bhulath, 23 kilometres (14 mi) away from district headquarter Kapurthala. The village is administrated by a Sarpanch, who is an elected representative.

== Demography ==
According to the report published by Census India in 2011, Mehmadpur has 162 houses with the total population of 641 persons of which 299 are male and 342 females. Literacy rate of Mehmadpur is 80.94%, higher than the state average of 75.84%. The population of children in the age group 0–6 years is 64 which is 9.98% of the total population. Child sex ratio is approximately 829, lower than the state average of 846.

== Population data ==
Particulars	Total	Male	Female
Total No. of Houses	162	-	-
Population	641	299	342
Child (0-6)	64	35	29
Schedule Caste	9	6	3
Schedule Tribe	0	0	0
Literacy	80.94 %	85.61 %	77.00 %
Total Workers	110	94	16
Main Worker	29	0	0
Marginal Worker	81	72	9

As per census 2011, 110 people were engaged in work activities out of the total population of Mehmadpur which includes 94 males and 16 females. According to census survey report 2011, 26.36% workers (Employment or Earning more than 6 Months) describe their work as main work and 73.64% workers are involved in Marginal activity providing livelihood for less than 6 months.

== Caste ==
The village has schedule caste (SC) constitutes 1.40% of total population of the village and it doesn't have any Schedule Tribe (ST) population.

== List of cities near the village ==
- Bhulath
- Kapurthala
- Phagwara
- Sultanpur Lodhi

== Air travel connectivity ==
The closest International airport to the village is Sri Guru Ram Dass Jee International Airport.
