= Mehmadpur, Jalandhar =

Mehmadpur
- Village
- Country: India
- State: Punjab
- District: Jalandhar
- Tehsil: Shahkot

Government
  - Type: Panchayat raj
  - Body: Gram panchayat

Area
  - Total: 166 ha (410 acres)

Population (2011)
  - Total: 464; 236/228 ♂/♀
  - Scheduled Castes: 184; 91/93 ♂/♀
  - Total Households: 96

Languages
  - Official: Punjabi
- Time zone: UTC+5:30 (IST)
- ISO 3166 code: IN-PB
- Website: jalandhar.gov.in

Mehmadpur is a village in Shahkot in Jalandhar district of Punjab State, India. It is located 15 kilometres (9.3 mi) from sub district headquarter and 30 kilometres (19 mi) from district headquarter. The village is administrated by Sarpanch an elected representative of the village.

== Demography ==
As of 2011, the village has a total number of 96 houses and a population of 464 of which 236 are males while 228 are females. According to the report published by Census India in 2011, out of the total population of the village 184 people are from Schedule Caste and the village does not have any Schedule Tribe population so far.

== See also ==
- List of villages in India
