= Randhir Singh Gollen =

Indian politician

Member of the Haryana Legislative Assembly

Personal details
- Party: Independent
- Other political affiliations: Bharatiya Janata Party

Randhir Singh Gollen was an Indian politician.

He was elected to the Haryana Legislative Assembly from Pundri in the 2019 Haryana Legislative Assembly election as an independent candidate.

Previously, he was associated with the Bharatiya Janata Party.
