= Karnal =

City in Haryana, India

- Metropolitan City
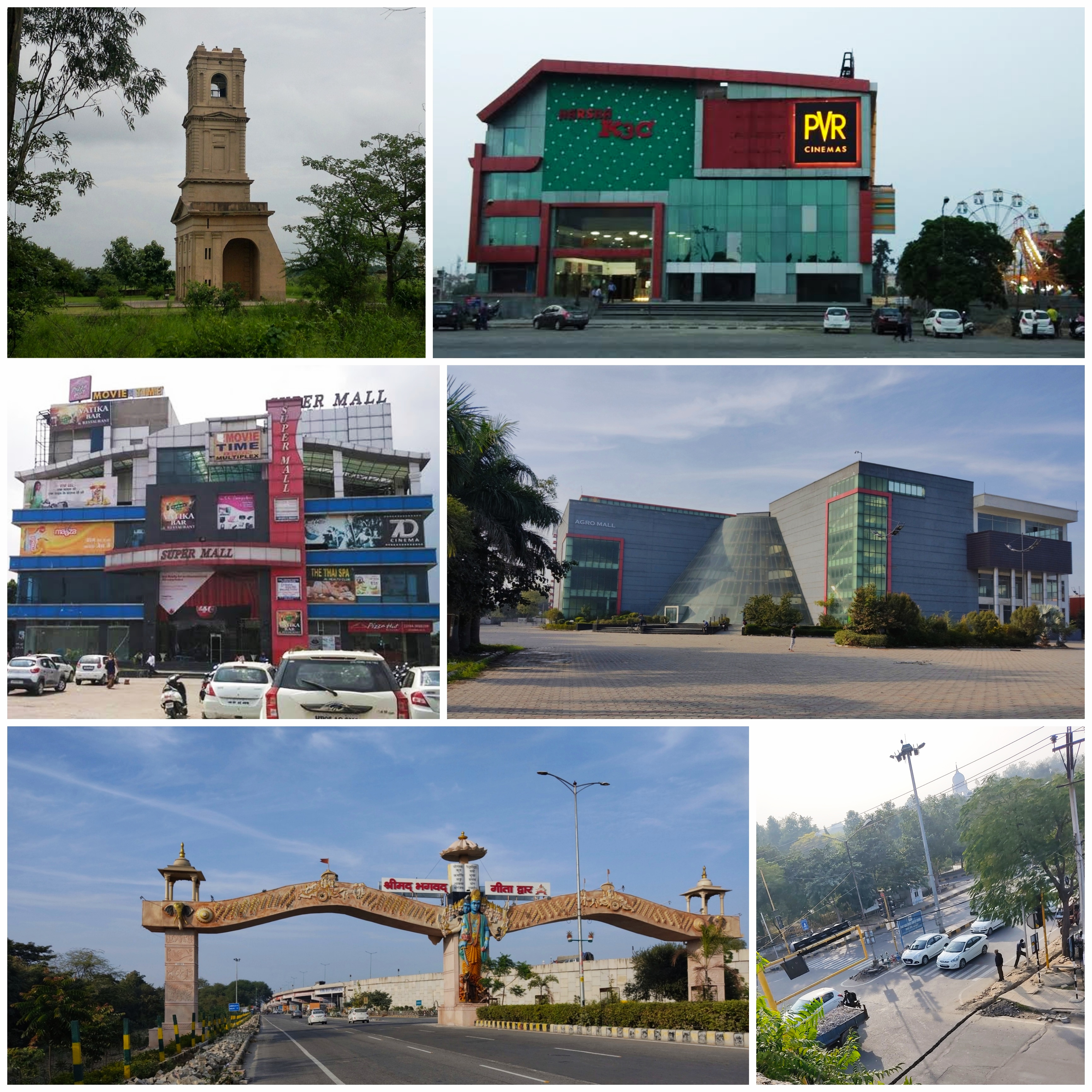
- Clockwise from top right; K3C Mall, Agro Mall, Sector 12 road, Shrimad Bhagwad Gita Dwar, Super Mall, Cantonment Church Tower.

- Location in Haryana, India Karnal (India)
- Coordinates: 29.686°N 76.989°E
- Country: India
- State: Haryana
- District: Karnal
- Region: North India
- Named for: Karna

Government
  - Type: Municipal Corporation
  - Body: Karnal Municipal Corporation
  - Mayor: Renu Bala Gupta (BJP)
  - Lok Sabha MP: Manohar Lal Khattar (BJP)
  - MLA: Jagmohan Anand (BJP)
  - Municipal Commissioner: Vaishali Sharma (IAS)

Area
  - Total: 87 km^{2} (34 sq mi)
- Elevation: 252 m (827 ft)

Population (2011)
  - Total: 286,974

Languages
  - Official: Hindi
  - Regional: Haryanvi
- Time zone: UTC+5:30 (IST)
- PIN: 132001
- Area code: 0184
- Vehicle registration: HR-05
- literacy rate: 84.60%
- Sex ratio: 915/1000 Female/Male
- Website: karnal.gov.in

Karnal (Punjabi pronunciation: [ˌkʌ̯ˈɾ.ˈnɐː˩˥l]) is a city located in the Indian state of Haryana and serves as the administrative headquarters of the Karnal district. The city lies on National Highway 44, which connects it to the national capital, New Delhi, and the state capital, Chandigarh, placing Karnal almost midway between the two. To the south of Karnal is the city of Panipat, while Kurukshetra and Kaithal lie to its north. The Yamuna River flows along its eastern edge, separating Karnal from the Saharanpur and Shamli districts of Uttar Pradesh. According to local tradition, the city is believed to have been named after Karna, a prominent figure in the Hindu epic Mahabharata. The Battle of Karnal between Nader Shah of Persia and the Mughal Empire took place in the city in 1739. Karnal was used as a refuge by the forces of the East India Company during the Indian Rebellion of 1857 in Delhi.

== History ==
At the end of the 6th century A.D., the area was under the rule of the Vardhanas of Thanesar. In the 7th century, the Indo-Gangetic plains experienced a period of religious eclecticism, as Buddhism declined while Hinduism resurged. Between 770 and 810 A.D., the region came under the influence of the Pala emperors of Bengal, who exercised authority over Kannauj at the time. Under the reign of Mihira Bhoja, Pratihara authority from Kannauj extended as far as Pehowa, encompassing the region of present-day Karnal.

The Tomaras, established themselves as rulers of the region in the middle of the 9th century. At the beginning of the 10th century, as the Pratihara power began to decline, the Tomaras assumed independence. One of the Tomara rulers, Anangpal Tomar, found the city of Delhi and made it his capital, with the area of Karnal and modern-day Haryana being under his realm. The Tomaras came into conflict with the Chauhans of Ajmer, but continued to rule the Haryana country until the middle of 12th century when they were overthrown by the Chaha mana Vighnaraja IV. The country between the Satluj and the Yamuna including Karnal experienced relative peace for a century and a half except the plundering invasions and eventual conquests of Mahmud of Ghazi. The region then came under Ghurid rule after the Second Battle of Tarain when Muhammad Ghori captured the area. It remained under the Delhi Sultanate until 1526.

In 1526 at the First Battle of Panipat, Mughal emperor Babur defeated the Sultan of Delhi, Ibrahim Lodi, and captured parts of North India, along with Delhi and Panipat. He then established the Mughal Empire in North India.

Karnal is listed in the Mughal Ain-i-Akbari as a pargana under Delhi sarkar, producing a revenue of 5,678,242 dams for the imperial treasury and supplying a force of 800 infantry and 50 cavalry.

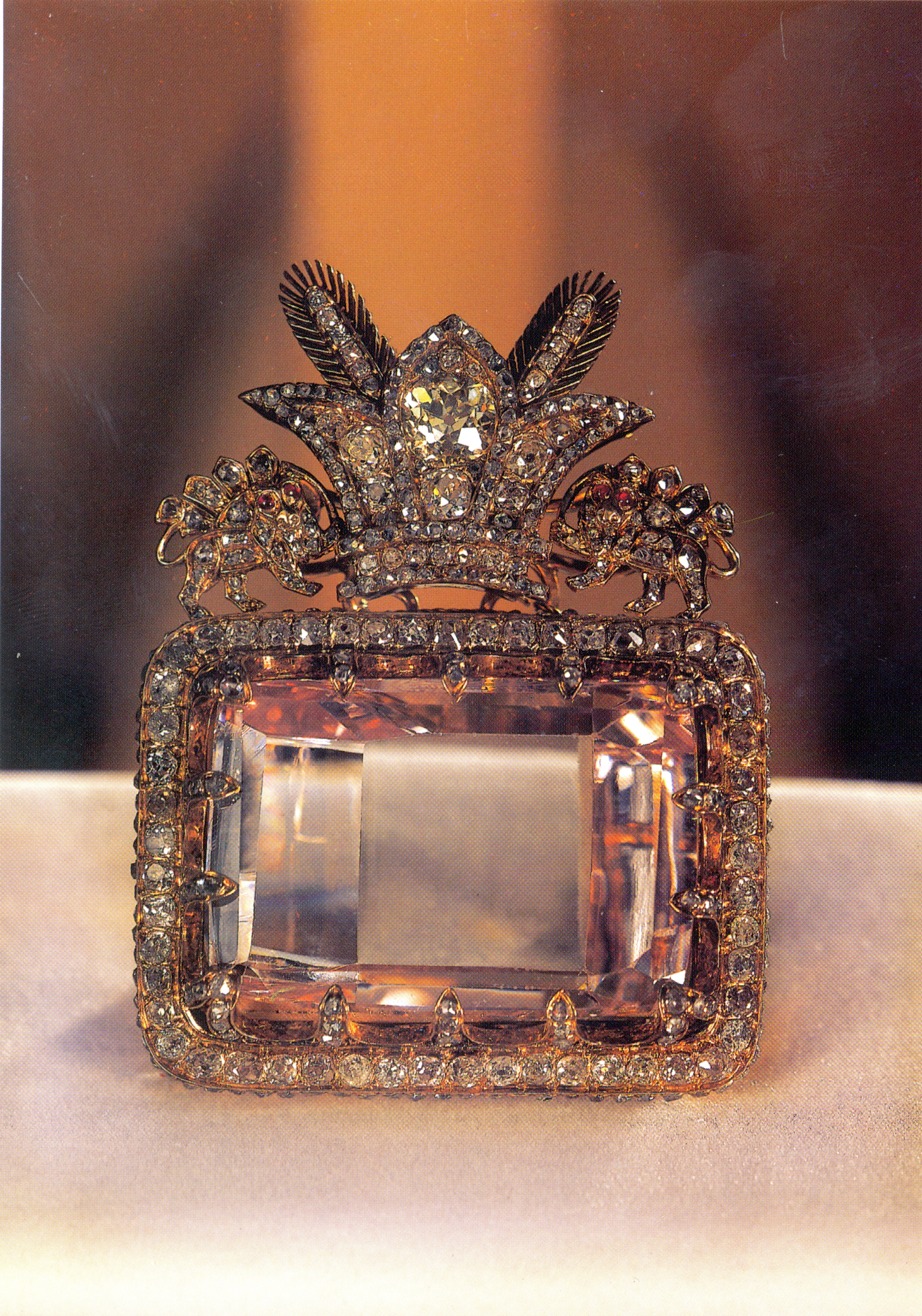
Daria-i-Noor diamond was seized by Persia's Nader Shah from the Mughal dynasty following the Battle of Karnal and subsequent sack of Delhi (1739)

In A.D. 1739, Nader Shah of Persia invaded the Mughal empire and Karnal was the scene of the famed Battle of Karnal, in which Nader Shah decisively defeated the Mughal Emperor, Muhammad Shah. Muhammad Shah along with an enormous army occupied a strongly fortified camp at Karnal, but he yielded to the invader as his supplies were cut off from the open country by Shah and was starved into submission. The tactical defeat drastically weakened the Mughal Empire, while the Persian Empire prospered and subsequently hastened the establishment of the British Empire in India. The region then came under Afghan rule. On 24 February 1739, the Iranian ruler Nadir Shah attacked India. Rao Bal Kishan, with his army and with the forces of Delhi, fought Nadir Shah. His army included 5000 infantry and 2000 cavalry. In February 1739, Nader Shah captured Sirhind and moved towards the field of Karnal, a battle destined to be fateful to the Mughal rulers. Every year on 24 February, Rao Bal Kishan Shaurya Diwas celebrated in Rewari.

Sikhs appeared on the scene in the 18th century. The importance of Karnal grew in the time of Raja Gajpat Singh of Jind State who after its capture in 1763 built the boundary wall and a fort and under whose rule the town increased considerably in size. On 14 January 1764, Sikh Chiefs defeated and killed Zain Khan Sirhindi, the Durrani Governor, and took possession of the whole of Sirhind province as far south as Panipat including Karnal.

During the Indian independence movement, a district political conference was organized at Karnal with Lala Lajpat Rai as its chairman.

== Geography ==
Karnal is located in the National Capital Region (NCR) of Haryana at 29°37′50″–29°44′40″ N latitude and 76°56′20″–77°02′50″ E longitude. The city is situated approximately 123 km north of Delhi and 130 km south of Chandigarh, along National Highway 44.

The city's urban expansion has primarily followed a linear pattern along National Highway 44, with another major growth corridor developing in the area between National Highway 44 and the Delhi–Ambala railway line. Expansion has been concentrated particularly in the eastern part of the city, largely replacing agricultural land and vegetation with built-up areas.

Urban growth has been comparatively limited in the western part of Karnal due to the presence of the Western Yamuna Canal and the Delhi–Ambala railway line, while the National Dairy Research Institute has restricted expansion towards the north-western part of the city.

== Climate ==
Karnal

Climate chart (precipitation, max. and min. temperature)
J	F	M	A	M	J	J	A	S	O	N	D
33 18 6	29 22 9	21 28 13	13 36 18	28 39 23	98 38 25	173 34 26	160 33 25	128 32 23	4.3 32 17	2 27 12	6 22 7
- █ Average max. and min. temperatures in °C
- █ Precipitation totals in mm
Imperial conversion
J	F	M	A	M	J	J	A	S	O	N	D
1.3 65 44	1.1 72 48	0.8 82 55	0.5 96 65	1.1 101 74	3.9 100 78	6.8 93 79	6.3 91 78	5.1 90 74	0.2 89 63	0.1 81 53	0.2 71 45
- █ Average max. and min. temperatures in °F
- █ Precipitation totals in inches

Climate data for Karnal (1991–2020, extremes 1949–2020)
Month	Jan	Feb	Mar	Apr	May	Jun	Jul	Aug	Sep	Oct	Nov	Dec	Year
Record high °C (°F)	31.2 (88.2)	33.2 (91.8)	37.5 (99.5)	45.2 (113.4)	46.0 (114.8)	46.0 (114.8)	43.9 (111.0)	42.0 (107.6)	38.3 (100.9)	39.3 (102.7)	34.4 (93.9)	28.8 (83.8)	46.0 (114.8)
Mean daily maximum °C (°F)	18.2 (64.8)	22.2 (72.0)	27.7 (81.9)	35.5 (95.9)	38.6 (101.5)	37.6 (99.7)	33.8 (92.8)	32.6 (90.7)	32.3 (90.1)	31.8 (89.2)	27.3 (81.1)	21.5 (70.7)	30.0 (86.0)
Daily mean °C (°F)	12.3 (54.1)	15.6 (60.1)	20.3 (68.5)	26.9 (80.4)	30.9 (87.6)	31.5 (88.7)	29.9 (85.8)	29.0 (84.2)	27.8 (82.0)	24.6 (76.3)	19.4 (66.9)	14.5 (58.1)	23.6 (74.5)
Mean daily minimum °C (°F)	6.4 (43.5)	8.9 (48.0)	12.9 (55.2)	18.3 (64.9)	23.1 (73.6)	25.4 (77.7)	26.0 (78.8)	25.3 (77.5)	23.2 (73.8)	17.3 (63.1)	11.5 (52.7)	7.4 (45.3)	17.2 (63.0)
Record low °C (°F)	−0.3 (31.5)	0.1 (32.2)	3.5 (38.3)	9.0 (48.2)	14.5 (58.1)	18.0 (64.4)	19.5 (67.1)	18.4 (65.1)	16.0 (60.8)	9.4 (48.9)	3.0 (37.4)	−0.4 (31.3)	−0.4 (31.3)
Average rainfall mm (inches)	32.5 (1.28)	28.9 (1.14)	21.1 (0.83)	13.3 (0.52)	27.6 (1.09)	98.4 (3.87)	172.8 (6.80)	160.2 (6.31)	128.4 (5.06)	4.3 (0.17)	2.0 (0.08)	6.0 (0.24)	695.4 (27.38)
Average rainy days	1.7	2.1	1.5	1.2	1.7	5.1	7.8	8.0	5.0	0.3	0.2	0.6	35.4
Average relative humidity (%) (at 17:30 IST)	70	63	52	29	29	45	70	76	71	55	53	63	56
Source: India Meteorological Department

== Demographics ==
The population of the city as of 2011, is 302,140.

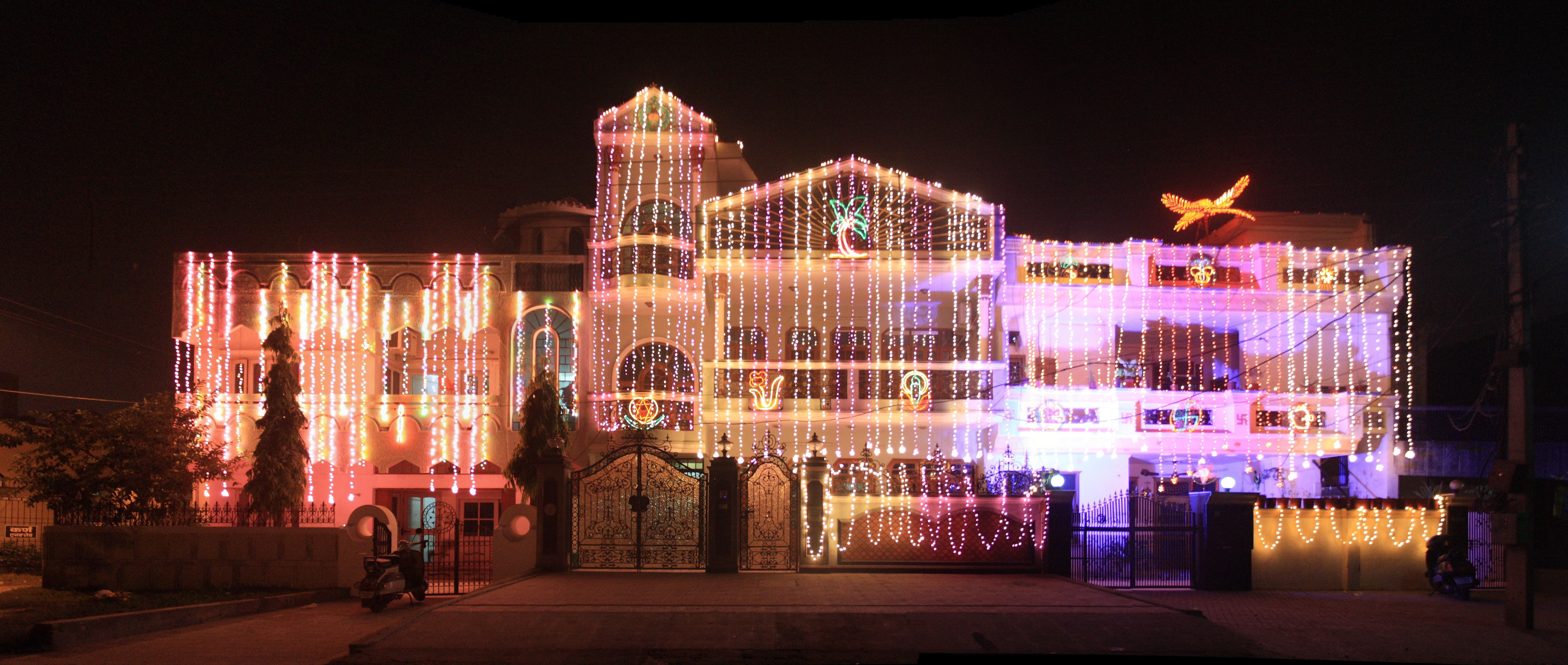
Houses During Diwali in Karnal

Religion in Karnal City
Religion	Population (1911)	Percentage (1911)	Population (1941)	Percentage (1941)	Population (2011)	Percentage (2011)
Hinduism (Note: 1941 census: Including Ad-Dharmis)	12,772	58.16%	20,462	54.65%	274,498	90.85%
Islam	8,667	39.47%	15,844	42.31%	3,938	1.3%
Sikhism	130	0.59%	647	1.73%	21,033	6.96%
Christianity	210	0.96%	125	0.33%	776	0.26%
Others (Note: Including Jainism, Buddhism, Zoroastrianism, Judaism, others, or not stated)	182	0.83%	366	0.98%	1,895	0.63%
Total Population	21,961	100%	37,444	100%	302,140	100%

The sex ratio in Karnal stood at 915 females per 1000 males in 2011, compared to the 2001 census figure of 862.

== Government ==
Karnal was constituted a municipality in 1867. The city subsequently functioned as a Municipal Committee before being upgraded to a Municipal Council. On 17 March 2010, it was granted the status of a Municipal Corporation. According to the IJRTS study, the city's expansion has accompanied this administrative transition, and the Municipal Corporation now covers an area of 90.57 km², including ten villages. The Municipal Corporation is administered under the provisions of the Haryana Municipal Corporation Act, 1994. It is divided into 20 wards, with each ward represented by an elected councilor.

Karnal Municipal Corporation is the municipal body responsible for governing the city. Renu Bala Gupta serves as the mayor, while Dr. Vaishali Sharma, IAS, is the commissioner of the municipal corporation.

The city forms a large part of the Karnal Assembly constituency, which is represented in the Haryana Legislative Assembly by Jagmohan Anand.

Manohar Lal Khattar is the Member of Parliament from the Karnal Lok Sabha constituency.

== Economy ==
Karnal's economy is primarily based on agriculture and agro-based industries. The city is internationally known for the production of rice, wheat, and milk, and serves as a major centre for agricultural research with institutions such as the National Dairy Research Institute (NDRI), Central Soil Salinity Research Institute (CSSRI), Directorate of Wheat Research, National Bureau of Animal Genetic Resources (NBAGR), and Sugarcane Breeding Institute. The city is also an important manufacturing hub, producing more than 40% of India's agricultural implements and components, supported by approximately 2,867 micro, small and medium enterprises (MSMEs). In recent years, Karnal has diversified its economy through industrial development and the growth of the service sector, with business process outsourcing (BPO) companies establishing operations in the city, contributing to its emergence as an industrial and employment hub.

== Facilities ==
Karnal was ranked 24th (1st in Haryana) among 4000+ cities in the list of the cleanest cities of India under the government survey named Swachh Survekshan 2019.

Karnal was selected as one of the hundred Indian cities to be developed as a smart city under the Union government's plan Smart Cities Mission.

== Education ==
- St. Theresa's Convent Sr. Sec. School.
- Kalpana Chawla Government Medical College.
- Dyal Singh Public School, Sector -7.
- Pratap Public School.
- Maharana Pratap Horticultural University.
- Pandit Deen Dayal Upadhayaya University of Health Sciences.
- State Institute of Engineering & Technology, Nilokheri.

=== Research Institutes ===
==== National Dairy Research Institute, Karnal ====
National Dairy Research Institute (NDRI) has been complementing country's massive dairy development programmes through its multifaceted activities in the areas of Dairy Research. NDRI is fully supported by the Indian Council of Agricultural Research and functions as one of the National Institutes under its aegis. The institute also interacts with various National and International Institutes in Dairying and allied fields for exchange of information and advancing new knowledge both in basic and applied fields of dairy science. The contributions of the Institute in conducting, collating and co-ordinating research in Dairying have received worldwide recognition. The Institute was conferred Deemed University status by the University Grants commission in March, 1989. For transfer of technology and dissemination of know-how developed at the Institute, the Operational Research Project, a programme of integrated crop and milk production improvement, links the Institute with farming community of 40 villages around Karnal.

==== National Bureau of Animal Genetics and Resources, Karnal ====
National Bureau of Animal genetic Resources and National Institute of animal Genetics were set up on 21 September 1984. These Institutes were initially located in the Campus of Southern Regional Station of NDRI, Bangalore. Since 19 July 1985 the Bureau and Animal Genetics Institute are in Karnal.
The broad aims of the Institutes are to conduct systematic surveys on animal and poultry genetic resources; to develop methodologies for the conservation of animal genetic resources in-situ through cryo-preservation and by developing transgenic forces; to establish data respository; to design methodologies for proper management and optimal utilisation of animal genetic resources; etc.

==== Directorate of Wheat Research, Karnal ====
Wheat Project Directorate (WPO) was made independent of Indian Agricultural Research Institute, New Delhi w.e.f. Ist September, 1990 and redesignated as Directorate of Wheat Research (DWR) with headquarters at Karnal.

==== Centre Soil Salinity Research Institute (CSSRI), Karnal ====
It was established in March 1969, under the aegis of the Indian Council of Agricultural Research (ICAR).

== Notable people ==
- Anish Bhanwala (born 2002), Indian sport shooter.
- Kalpana Chawla (born 1962), first woman of Indian origin to fly in outer space. Chawla was one of the seven crew members who died in the Space Shuttle Columbia disaster
- Mool Chand Jain (born 1915), Indian Independence movement leader.
- Liaquat Ali Khan (born 1895), first prime minister of Pakistan
- Arthur Power Palmer (born 1840), Commander-in-Chief of the British Indian Army.
- Navdeep Saini (born 1992), Indian cricketer
- Vikramjeet Virk (born 1984), Indian actor working in Hindi, Punjabi, and Telugu Films.
