= Govt. Post Graduate College, Hisar =

College in Haryana, India

Government Post Graduate College, Hisar
- Other names: Govt PG College, Hisar
- Type: Public
- Established: 1950
- Academic affiliations: Guru Jambheshwar University of Science and Technology
- Location: Hisar, Haryana, India; 29.1474°N 75.7194°E
- Campus: Urban, 40 acres (16 ha)
- Website: www.gchisar.com

Guru Gorakhnath Government Post Graduate College, Hisar is a public funded college located in Hisar in the Indian state of Haryana for fodder research and training.

== Etymology ==
The college is named after the Gorakhnath, who lived between 11th to 12th or even 14th century CE.

== Location ==
It lies on Hisar- rajgarh road to the east of the college. To the north is Mahabir Stadium.

== History ==
In 1950, the college was established at a rented building on the Railway road shared by the Punjab Veterinary College which was later moved to the Government Livestock Farm, Hisar in 1961 and eventually became part of the CCS HAU later and is currently part of the Lala Lajpat Rai University of Veterinary and Animal Sciences (LUVAS). In 1976, the govt college moved to its current 49-acre site located on Rajgarh road, where the newly constructed 5 blocks buildings cost INR 5,000,000 at that time.

In 1977–78, the college had 1,624 students (1,404 boys and 220 girls). In 2007–08, the college had 3,395 students and 125 faculty members with a teacher student ratio of 1:27.

== Details ==
The college offers undergraduate and post-graduate courses in arts, science, commerce, business, computer and electronics.

== Pranpir Badshah Tomb ==
In the college campus, there lies the 12th century Pranpir Badshah tomb immediate-east of the Panchayat bhawan.

== See also ==
- List of Universities and Colleges in Hisar
- List of schools in Hisar
- List of institutions of higher education in Haryana
