= Chhaju Ram Law College, Hisar =

Law college in Haryana, India

- Other names: C.R. Law College Hisar
- Established: 2003
- Principal: Dr. Krishen Kumar Kajal
- Location: Hisar, Haryana, India; 29.1503°N 75.7223°E
- Campus: Urban, 19 acres (7.7 ha)
- Website: www.crlawcollege.com

Chhaju Ram Law College, Hisar is a college located on Hisar-Rajgarh road in Hisar in the Indian state of Haryana.

== History ==
The classes of newly established college were held in a wing of the old Jat High School building. It was built up by Seth Chhaju Ram in 1929 in the memory of his son Ajit Kumar (1905–1913). It now functions out of its own building on Rajgarh Road next to Akashwani Bhawan and District Court Hisar.

The college is run by the non-profit Jat Educational Society Hisar (JES), which also runs CRM JAT College, Chhaju Ram College of Education, Hisar, Chhaju Ram Jat Senior Secondary School, Hisar and Chhaju Ram Public School, Hisar.

== Academics ==
C. R. Law College, Hisar offers 160 seats every year in three-year LLB bachelor's degree (Professional) and 120 seats of five-year B.A. LLB Integrated degree course affiliated to the Guru Jambheshwar University of Science and Technology, Hisar.

== See also ==
- List of Universities and Colleges in Hisar
- List of schools in Hisar
- List of institutions of higher education in Haryana
