= Chaudhary Charan Singh Haryana Agricultural University =

Public agricultural university in Haryana, India

- Other name: HAU
- Former name: Haryana Agricultural University (till 30 October 1991)
- Motto: Inspiring Agriprenuers
- Type: Public
- Established: 2 February 1970; 56 years ago
- Founder: A. L. Fletcher
- Accreditation: ICAR
- Academic affiliations: ICAR; UGC
- Budget: ₹ 697.3 Crore (2022–23)
- Chancellor: Governor of Haryana
- Vice-Chancellor: Dr. B. R. Kamboj
- Academic staff: 543
- Administrative staff: 2211
- Undergraduates: 796
- Postgraduates: 380
- Doctoral students: 700
- Location: Hisar, Haryana, 125004, Hisar, Haryana, India; 29.14°N 75.70°E
- Campus: 8,645 acres (3,499 ha); Urban
- Colours: Green and Maroon
- Nickname: HAU
- Sporting affiliations: Giri Centre
- Website: www.hau.ac.in

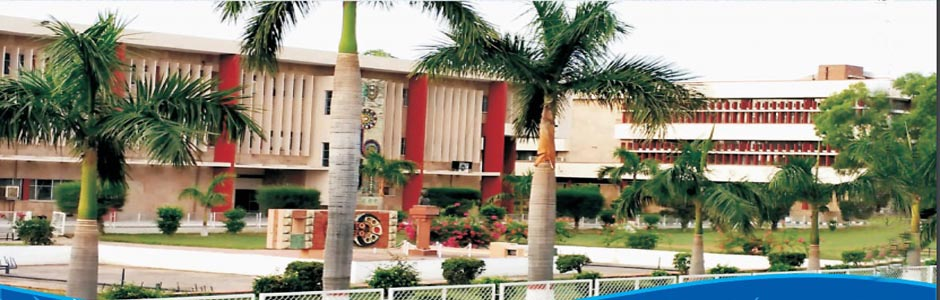
Fletcher Bhawan, one of the main Administrative building constituting the Campus Core

Chaudhary Charan Singh Haryana Agricultural University is a publicly funded agricultural university located at Hisar in the Indian state of Haryana. It is the biggest agricultural university in Asia. The university has 8,645 acres (3,499 ha) of land, including around 7,219 acres (2,921 ha) at the main campus and 1,426 acres (577 ha) at outstations. It is named after India's fifth Prime Minister, Chaudhary Charan Singh. It was ranked 7th in India by the National Institutional Ranking Framework in the agriculture and allied sector ranking for 2024.

The university was initially a satellite campus of Punjab Agricultural University at Hisar. It was established as a university by the Haryana and Punjab Agricultural Universities Act, ratified on February 2nd, 1970, and was named Haryana Agricultural University. It is considered the first established university in the of state of Haryana. On October 31st, 1991, it was renamed Chaudhary Charan Singh Haryana Agricultural University. A. L. Fletcher was the first vice-chancellor of the university.

The university publishes the largest number of research papers among agricultural universities in India. It won the Indian Council of Agricultural Research's Award for the Best Institute in 1997 and in 2017. It contributed significantly to the Green Revolution and White Revolution in India.

== History ==
According to data maintained by the Government of India's Department of Statistics, the HAU's Department of Agronomy was established in 1930, and the Department of Entomology was founded in 1956 at Punjab Agricultural University.

In February 1948, the Punjab College of Veterinary Sciences was opened at Railway Road in Hisar in a rented building, which was shared with the Government College Hisar from 1950 onward. In 1961, the Punjab College of Veterinary Sciences moved to the Government Livestock Farm, Hisar, and it eventually came under the Punjab Agricultural University (PAU) as a satellite campus when PAU was established in 1962. In 1962, the College of Agriculture was established. In 1964, the College of Basic Sciences and Humanities was established. In 1966, the College of Animal Sciences was established. In 1966, when Haryana was formed, the university was declared an autonomous institution. On 2 February 1970, it was ratified and established as a university by the Haryana and Punjab Agricultural Universities Act and was named Haryana Agricultural University, with A. L. Fletcher as its first Vice-Chancellor. The four constituent colleges of HAU located at Hisar, namely the College of Agriculture, the College of Basic Sciences, the College of Animal Sciences and the College of Veterinary Sciences, became part of Haryana Agricultural University. In 1971, a regional campus of the university was opened at Kaul. In 1972, the College of Sports was established, and in 1973, the College of Home Science was established. In 1973, the College of Home Sciences was added. On 31 October 1991, HAU was renamed Chaudhary Charan Singh Haryana Agricultural University. In 1992, the College of Agricultural Engineering was established.

In 2010, the College of Veterinary Sciences and the College of Animal Sciences were separated from the university and became a part of the newly formed Lala Lajpat Rai University of Veterinary and Animal Sciences (LUVAS).

== Campus ==
It is located about 5 km from the Guru Jambheshwar University of Science and Technology; 4 km from Blue Bird Lake; 2 km from the bus station along National Highway 9 (old NH 10); 1 km from the town centre and main market area; 100 metres from Mahabir Stadium; 1 km from Hisar Junction railway station; 6 km from Hisar Airport; 167 km from Indira Gandhi International Airport; 180 km from New Delhi railway station; and 235 km from Chandigarh International Airport.

The main campus of CCS HAU has four gates: Gate No. 1 near Mahabir Stadium; Gate No. 2 and Gate No. 3 behind Campus School and next to Giri Centre, respectively, both on MDR107 Balsamand road; and Gate No. 4 on NH52 Rajgarh road.

The development plan of the university is based on the concept of a Central Campus Core around which academic buildings for various colleges, schools and departments, and residential, recreational and common facilities such as Faculty House and Club, Farmers' Hostel, Students' Hostel, Hospital and Shopping Centre are built. The buildings comprising the Core are Gandhi Bhawan, Nehru Library, Indira Gandhi Auditorium and the Administration Building, situated on three sides of a great plaza, the greater part of which is four feet above ground level.

The main campus of the university is situated at Hisar, at a distance of 162 km northwest of Delhi, on National Highway No. 10, and is 2 km from the railway station and 3 km from the bus stand. The university is spread over an area of 7,219 acres at Hisar and 1,426 acres at outstations. The area at Hisar under farms is 6,483 acres, and the area under buildings and roads is 736 acres.

HAU has a central campus core formed by Fletcher Bhawan, Gandhi Bhawan (built 1975–1978), Indira Gandhi Auditorium (built 1982–1985), and Nehru Library, around which the other buildings and facilities are built. The university has a total land area of 29.15 km^{2} (11.25 sq mi), comprising 12.91 km^{2} (4.98 sq mi) at the main campus at Hisar, 10.68 km^{2} (4.12 sq mi) at the Dr. Ramdhan Singh Seed Production Farm at Hisar, and 5.56 km^{2} (2.15 sq mi) at outstations.

=== Facilities ===
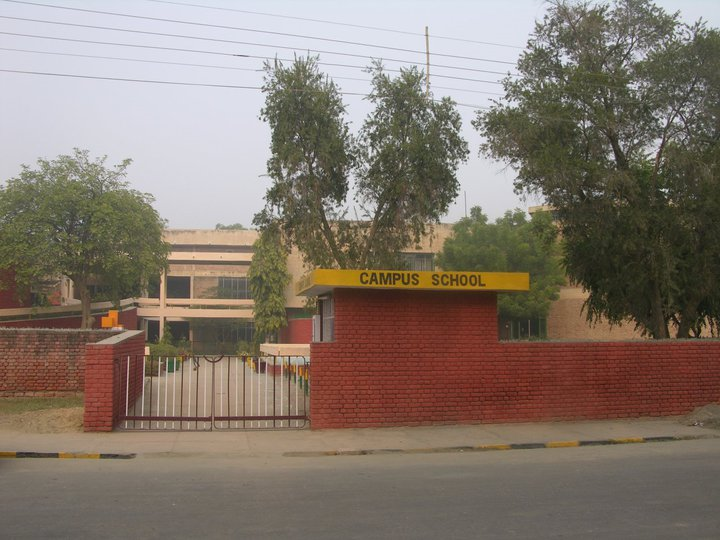
Campus School, CCS HAU located inside the university campus, caters to the children of university employees.

Spread over an area of 298 hectares, the university has four constituent colleges: College of Agriculture, College of Agricultural Engineering & Technology, College of Basic Sciences & Humanities, and College of Home Science. Each college building is a complete institution in itself, having a large number of lecture rooms, laboratories, auditoriums, seminar rooms, audio-visual laboratories, and computer facilities.

To accommodate administrative staff, the university has an administrative block known as Fletcher Bhawan. The Directorate of Extension Education, along with the Directorate of Publications, is housed in a spacious, double-storey building named Gandhi Bhawan. Adjacent to Gandhi Bhawan is the Dean, Postgraduate Studies Block, which houses the Dean, Postgraduate Studies staff.

In addition to the colleges, the university campus has the following facilities:

- Fletcher Bhawan, the administrative block.
- Nehru Library, a collection of over 375,000 books and more than 2,500 journals on a floor area of 100,000 square feet (9,300 m^{2}).
- Campus School for the children of the faculty.
- Indira Gandhi Auditorium at HAU.
- Gandhi Bhawan, serving as the Directorate of Extension Education.
- HAU Campus Hospital, a 50-bed hospital for the university community.
- Government High School at HAU, opened in 1980.
- HAU Faculty Club.
- HAU Faculty House.
- HAU Farmers' Hostel and Kisan Ashram for visiting farmers.
- Residential buildings (970 at Hisar and 242 at outstations) for staff and faculty.
- Shopping Centre with grocery shops, banks, post office, and book stores.
- HAU Community Centre complex.
- Academy of Agricultural Research and Education Management (AAREM).
- HAU Counselling and Placement Cell, which provides students with the opportunity to interact with national and international organisations to facilitate job opportunities and other activities related to their career advancement.

== Organisation and administration ==
=== Governance ===
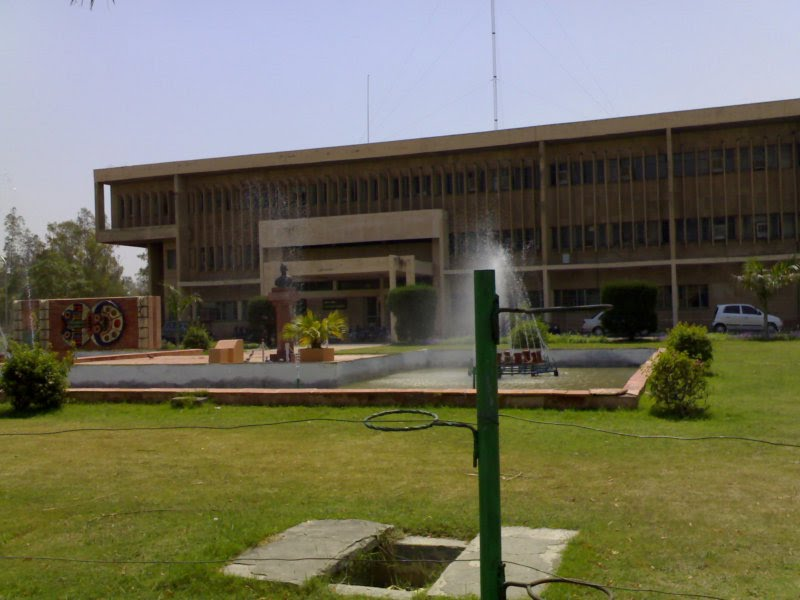
Fletcher Bhawan, administrative office of the university.

The Board of Management is the main policy-making body responsible for the management of the university. The Governor of Haryana is the Chancellor of the university and the honorary chairman of the Board of Management. The Vice-Chancellor is the working chairman of the board and the principal executive and academic head of the university. Official members include the secretaries of agriculture, finance, and community development of the Government of Haryana. Non-official members are also nominated by the Government of Haryana. The Director of Agriculture and Director of Animal Husbandry of the Government of Haryana act as technical advisors, whereas the Registrar is the Secretary of the Board.

The Office of the Registrar is responsible for academic, employee, and faculty-related affairs of the university. The Office of the Comptroller is responsible for finance, investment, budget, and expenditure-related affairs of the university, and the Directorate of Students Welfare is responsible for housing, boarding, student welfare, and various non-academic activities. The supreme academic authority is the Academic Council, chaired by the Vice-Chancellor. There are Boards of Studies headed by Deans, one for each college in the university. There are some non-statutory committees to assist with general administration.

=== Colleges ===
HAU has four colleges on the main campus at Hisar:

- College of Agriculture (CoA)
- College of Agricultural Engineering and Technology
- College of Basic Sciences & Humanities
- Indira Chakravarty College of Home Science
- College of Fisheries Science (CoF)
- Department of Agribusiness & Management, Hisar
- Institute of Agribusiness & Management, Gurugram

=== Research stations ===
There are two additional research stations and colleges of agriculture.

==== Kaul Agriculture Research stations ====
It is located at Kaul in Kaithal district.

==== Bawal Research stations ====
It is located at Jhabuwa, near Bawal in Rewari district.

=== Regional centres ===
The university has research facilities spread throughout the state of Haryana.

- Eight Krishi Vigyan Kendras (Agricultural Science Centres) situated at Devigarh (Kaithal), Kurukshetra, Bhopani (Faridabad), Jagdispur (Sonepat), Sadalpur (Hisar), Jind, Ujha (Panipat), and Damla (Yamunanagar).
- Twelve Krishi Gyan Kendras (Agricultural Knowledge Centres) at Karnal, Rohtak, Jind, Ambala, Sirsa, Gurgaon, Sonipat, Bhiwani, Panchkula, Palwal (Faridabad), Hisar, and Mahendragarh.
- Regional Research Stations at Bawal (Rewari), Rohtak, Uchani (Karnal), Kaul (Kaithal), Buria (Yamunanagar), Ambala, and Balsamand (Hisar).
- A Training Institute at Nilokheri (Karnal).
- Six Disease Investigation Labs at Rohtak, Ambala, Sirsa, Jind, Gurgaon, and Karnal.

=== Associated institutions ===
- Academy of Agricultural Research and Education Management
- Haryana Space Applications Centre, Hisar, a nodal agency of the Department of Science and Technology, Government of Haryana, for remote sensing and GIS applications.
- Centre on Plant Biotechnology, Hisar.

=== Directorate ===
==== Farm Information and Communication Service ====
The Farm Information and Communication Service of the Directorate provides audiovisual and mass media support to the various wings, sections, and departments of the university. Publication Unit: Like other units, the Publication Unit, including Press and Photography, is also one of the important units. The monthly magazine Haryana Kheti, based on research evidence and the experiences of subject-matter experts, is published by the Unit. Other publications, such as Package of Practices Kharif, Rabi and Horticultural & Vegetable Crops, Animal Husbandry, and Home Science, as well as other extension literature, are published to provide need-based, problem-oriented information to the farming community. The magazine and other publications are supplied by the Publication Unit to subscribers on a payment basis. The University Press handles the printing work of the university as a whole.

==== Agri-tourism Centre and farmers fair ====
"Haryana State Farmer's and Agri-tourism Fair", simply called the "Kisan Mela", is an annual fair organised at HAU by this unit. It is the largest fair of its kind in the state. It entails "open house" visits to the Agri-tourism Centre as well as an exhibition at another location within HAU, with stalls of various departments and suppliers of agri products and equipment. This is done to encourage agri-tourism, disseminate information to farmers, and facilitate networking among farmers, farm input suppliers, buyers, food processing units, and consumers.

This unit also organises exhibitions, such as Farm Darshan, at the state, zonal, and district levels in collaboration with the other two wings of the Directorate and other departments and colleges.

=== Haryana Rural Antique Museum ===
The Haryana Rural Antique Museum in Gandhi Bhawan, established by this unit, exhibits the evolution of agriculture and vanishing antiques.

Jahaj Kothi Museum, named after George Thomas, is located inside Firoz Shah Palace Complex and maintained by the Archaeological Survey of India. The Rakhigarhi Indus Valley Civilisation Museum is located at Rakhigarhi, an Indus Valley civilisation site 60 km away, which also has a museum developed by the state government.

=== Agri Business Incubation Centre (ABIC) ===
The Agri Business Incubation Centre, CCSHAU, was established as a business incubator with INR 11.75 crore funding from NABARD to encourage startup value-addition entrepreneurship, training, and guidance for youth. Its foundation stone was laid on 2 February 2018. To generate employment and double farmers' income, ABIC will act as a single-window access point for consultancy, incubation, initial business proposal development, procurement of resources and finance, risk mitigation, and other services.

=== Agricultural Extension Centres (AEC) ===
The CCSHAU Directorate of Extension Education started establishing Krishi Gyan Kendra (Agricultural Knowledge Centres) in districts of the state of Haryana from 1966, with funding from the Indian Council of Agricultural Research. In 1989, the new extension centres were named Krishi Vigyan Kendra (Farm Service Centres), and since then one Krishi Vigyan Kendra (KVK) was established in each district of Haryana, to disseminate information and provide vocational training in the relevant technologies among farmers, rural youth and rural development agencies. There are a total of 11 KGKs and 19 KVKs (c. 2012).

The first Kisan Sewa Kendra (Agricultural Technology Information Centre) was established at the university's main campus in 2002, and there are currently a total of three Kisan Sewa Kendra (KSKs) (c. 2012) with toll-free helpline agricultural services for farmers. Seeds of various crops, fruits, vegetables, fertilisers and animal products are provided to farmers at subsidised rates through these centres.

=== Deendyal Upadhaya Centre of Excellence for Organic Farming (DUCEOF) ===
The non-profit Deendyal Upadhaya Centre of Excellence for Organic Farming, attached to the dairy, was established on 139 acres of land on 31 October 2017 to promote and provide training in organic farming. The organic produce will be sold in the National Capital Region.

== Academics ==
=== Academic programmes ===
The institute offers undergraduate, postgraduate, and doctoral programmes. Undergraduate programmes award BSc (Hons) and BTech degrees in various agricultural fields. Postgraduate programmes award MSc, MTech, and M.B.A. degrees. There is also a PhD programme.

=== Admission ===
Admission to the undergraduate programmes (except BTech in Agricultural Engineering) is through a Common Entrance Test that includes questions on physics, chemistry, and biology, mathematics, or agriculture. Admission is offered in July, in order of merit, in two counselling sessions. 75% of positions are offered to residents of Haryana, and the remaining 25% are filled through an all-India entrance test organised by the Indian Council of Agricultural Research. The seats for BTech in Agricultural Engineering are filled through HSTES counselling based on the results of the JEE examination conducted by NTA and the ICAR examination conducted by the Indian Council of Agricultural Research. As of 2021, 41 seats are available for Haryana residents and 6 for ICAR students.

=== Laboratories ===
The university has laboratories that provide facilities such as DNA sequencing, UV trans-illuminators, PCR, FT-IR, gene guns, gene pulsers, electron microscopes, plasma spectrometers, X-ray diffraction, and chromatography. Screen houses, greenhouses and transgenic greenhouses are also available to researchers.

=== Experimental farms ===
The university has an experimental farm of 9.94 km^{2} (3.84 sq mi) at the main campus and ten experimental farms at regional research stations, with a total area of 5.68 km^{2} (2.19 sq mi). These farms have both canal and tubewell irrigation facilities. The Government of Haryana has provided an additional 16.08 km^{2} (6.21 sq mi) of land to the university exclusively for seed production.

=== Printing press ===
There is a fully operational University Press to handle the printing of university publications such as Haryana Kheti in Hindi and Haryana Farming in English. Besides the above, several books in Hindi, such as Package of Practices for Rabi and Kharif Crops and Preservation, and Package of Practices for Kharif Crops in English, are printed in HAU Press. Some publications have also been printed on behalf of the Commission for Scientific and Technical Terminology, Ministry of Human Resource Development, Government of India, New Delhi.

== Research ==
The university publishes the largest number of research papers among agricultural universities in India. It has four official publications: HAU Journal of Research, Haryana Veterinarian, Haryana Kheti, and Thesis Abstracts. A Kisan Mela (Farmers' Fair) is organised every year in March to promote the spread of agricultural technology among farmers. HAU has released about 250 varieties of wheat, barley, rice, maize, millets, forage crops, cash crops such as sugarcane, cotton and oilseeds, medicinal plants, vegetables and horticultural crops. The Extension Department also runs a weather and crop advisory service for farmers called eMausam.

== Student life ==
=== Residential life ===
Directorate of Students Welfare is responsible for providing residential facilities to students. The university has a total of 14 hostels, of which 12 are located at Hisar. Of the 12 hostels located at Hisar, eight are for males, three for females, and one for married students. There are separate hostels for in-service and foreign students. There are two hostels, one each for males and females, at Kaul in Kaithal. The hostels have a total capacity of 1,200 students. Aravali Hostel is the oldest hostel of the university. Its construction started in 1958. It served as the administrative block of the university during its first year.

Along with the official buildings, the university has 1,220 units of residential buildings (970 at Hisar and 242 at outstations) distributed into different categories. The hostel accommodation is sufficient to house all the students on the university roll. The university has a two-room-set married hostel for married students located in the residential complex. Each hostel has a separate complex housing catering services and indoor games, along with modern recreational and communication facilities such as TV and phone. The university has a well-furnished Faculty House with facilities comparable to those of modern guest houses, serving the housing needs of national and international scientists visiting CCS HAU, Hisar. There is a farmers' hostel close to the Faculty House with the same level of facilities for farmers visiting the university. The Faculty House can provide accommodation for about 72 people at a time. Similarly, the farmers' hostel could accommodate about 76 persons at its full occupancy. In addition to these modern housing accommodations, there is a spacious Kisan Ashram catering to the needs of farmer trainees attending different short-term courses organised by the Directorate of Extension Education from time to time.

To serve the community needs of faculty members, the university has a spacious Faculty Club. Similarly, there is a community centre to serve the community needs of the supporting staff.

=== Medical Services ===
There is a well-equipped 50-bed hospital on the main campus at Hisar and three dispensaries at outstations, i.e., College of Agriculture, Kaul (Kaithal), Regional Research Stations, Karnal, and Bawal. The hospital at the main campus has five doctors and a dentist. Round-the-clock medical aid is provided to students, staff, and other trainees.

=== Clubs and societies ===
Different clubs and societies have been formed to organise various extracurricular activities within the university. The Dramatics and Music Club is responsible for organising cultural activities. It was formed in 1973. The club presented Haryanvi folk dance at the Indian Festival held in Moscow, Russia, in 1986 and has participated in every All India Inter-Agricultural University Youth Festival (AgriUniFest) organised by the Indian Council of Agricultural Research since its inception in 2000. It has won theatrical events at the festival four times and group song events six times.

The Graphic Arts Society and Literary Society are responsible for arts and literary activities. The Graphics Art Society was established in 1970. It also offers photography as a co-curricular activity in the university's course curriculum for undergraduate students. Many members of this society have won awards at the AgriUniFest. Students of the Literary Society have been awarded in elocution, extempore, and debate competitions at the AgriUniFest.

The CCS HAU Mountaineering Club provides mountaineering opportunities to the students of the university. The club was started in 1971, and its motto is "Youth for Adventure". The club offers trekking programmes, seminars on mountain sports, and basic and advanced courses in rock climbing, mountaineering, and skiing. In 2007, the club organised a motorbike expedition from Hisar to Khardung La, the world's highest motorable pass. The club publishes its own online magazine known as HAUMC Magazine and also operates the world's first trekking helpline. The club also organises humanitarian and voluntary activities such as awareness campaigns, environmental campaigns, and fundraising events. The club is based at the Giri Centre for Sports Activities of the university.

=== Other facilities ===
The National Cadet Corps and National Service Scheme (NSS) are available as credit activities at the university. NSS was established at the university in 1970. Many students of the university have been selected for the Republic Day Parade, and one student has been selected for International Youth Development Exchange Programme held in Tokyo, Japan. The Counselling and Placement Centre provides placement opportunities, whereas Alumni Association is responsible for handling alumni relations.

=== Directorate of Students' Welfare ===
The Directorate of Students' Welfare is responsible for making arrangements for housing, boarding, and welfare of the students and various co-curricular activities other than academic work. The Directorate of Students Welfare serves as a hub for student guidance, counselling, and placement activities for all its constituent colleges. The Directorate helps CCS HAU graduates obtain suitable placements in various nationalized banks, agro-based companies, industries, MNCs, and NGOs. It facilitates students' pursuit of higher education in India and abroad by conducting coaching classes, motivation lectures, mock group discussions, and interview simulations. The Directorate of Students' Welfare is also responsible for promoting all co-curricular activities, such as sports, NCC, NSS, mountaineering, graphic arts, literary activities, music, dance, drama, and NIS. Various trainings are arranged from time to time for the promotion of these activities.

== Sports ==
Directorate of Students Welfare is responsible for non-academic activities of the university. The Sports Authority of India has established a Sports Training Center at HAU to impart training in athletics, boxing, judo and table tennis.

=== Giri Centre for Sports Activities ===
The Giri Centre, which also houses the Sports Authority of India's (SAI) "Sports Training Centre" for students' sports activities, is an outstanding feature of the university. Since 2001, it has had dedicated "center of excellence" facilities for several sports, including the "Center of Excellence for Wrestling" named after Sakshi Malik, as well as hockey, boxing, and judo. It also has two indoor badminton courts with a seating capacity for 600 spectators, an Olympic-size swimming pool, two indoor squash courts, hobby rooms, and two multipurpose indoor gymnasiums with a reasonable seating capacity. A synthetic athletics and hockey track of international standard has been built.

All the sports events of the university are held at the Giri Centre. It has a cricket ground, a football ground, and an athletics stadium with a synthetic track of international standard. A first-class match was played at the cricket stadium here between the Haryana cricket team and the Jammu and Kashmir cricket team on 11 November 1975 during the Ranji Trophy tournament.

Logo of University Handball Club

=== University Handball Club ===
Handball is a particularly popular sport at HAU, and the university has its own Handball Club. The club won a gold medal at the All India Inter Varsity Handball Championship in 1988, a bronze medal at the Senior National Handball Championship, and has won the Haryana State Handball Championship five times. The university organised the All India Inter Varsity Handball Championship once, in 1988. Three players from the club have represented the Indian handball team at international level, and almost all the players of the Haryana handball team belong to HAU.

== Notable people ==
=== Notable alumni ===
- Anil Kumar Gupta, professor in the Centre for Management in Agriculture at IIM, Ahmedabad, founder of the Honey Bee Network, Executive VC of the NIF, and recipient of the 2004 Padma Shri National Award for management education.
- Sanjeev Balyan, Member of Parliament from Muzaffarnagar.
- Jagat Jakhar, Haryanvi film actor and lead actor of the highest-grossing Haryanvi film, Chandrawal.
- Harsh Vardhan Batra, former director of the Defence Food Research Laboratory.

=== Notable faculty ===
- Dr. Jai Bhagwan Chaudhary, former vice-chancellor of CCSHAU and GBPUA&T Pantnagar, and recipient of the Padma Shri award.
- Anthony Leocadia Fletcher, Indian civil servant, and first vice-chancellor of HAU.
- Megh R. Goyal, considered the father of irrigation engineering in Puerto Rico.
- Udey Chand, Arjuna Award recipient and the first individual world championship medal winner from independent India.

=== Notable residents ===
- Saina Nehwal, World Junior Badminton Championship champion and Rajiv Gandhi Khel Ratna recipient, and student of CCS HAU Campus School.
- Yash Tonk, Indian actor, finalist of Nach Baliye 2, and student of CCS HAU Campus School.

== See also ==
- Inspire Institute of Sport at CCS HAU Giri Centre
- Mahabir Stadium, Hisar
- State University of Performing And Visual Arts
- State Institute of Film and Television
- List of institutions of higher education in Haryana
- List of Universities and Colleges in Hisar
- List of agricultural universities and colleges
