= Campus School, CCS HAU =

Campus School

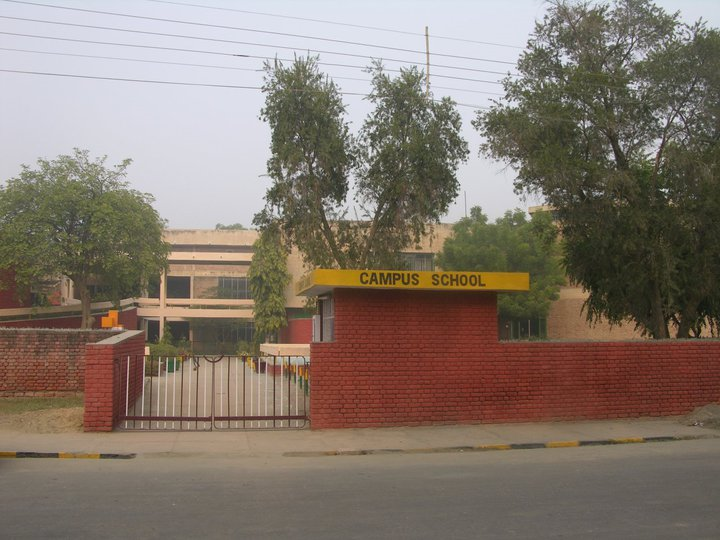

Location
- Campus School Road, CCS HAU, Hisar; CCS HAU; Hisar, Haryana; India
- 29°15′09″N 75°42′56″E

Information
- School type: Public, Senior Secondary
- Motto: Satyamev Jayate (Truth Stands Invincible)
- Established: 14 November 1971
- Founder: A. L. Fletcher
- Status: Open
- School board: CBSE
- School number: 530002
- School code: 04035
- Chairman: Vice-Chancellor (CCS HAU)
- Principal: Mr. S.S.S DHULIPALA
- Vice-chairman: Controlling Officer (CCS HAU)
- Faculty: 37
- Years offered: 12
- Gender: Co-educational
- Age: 6 years to 18 years
- Student to teacher ratio: 29:1
- Classes offered: Class I to class XII
- Language: English, Hindi
- Hours in school day: 6 hours
- Campus type: Urban
- Houses: Subhash, Gandhi, Nehru, Tagore, Vivekanand
- Colours: White and Blue (Summer); White and Grey (Winter)
- Sports: Volleyball
- National ranking: 3rd (2009)
- First SSC Batch passed in: 1977
- First HSC Batch passed in: 1985
- Clubs: Literary & Creative, Mathematics, Scientific Skills, Performing Arts, ECO and Health & Wellness

Campus School is a public English medium senior secondary co-educational school situated in the Chaudhary Charan Singh Haryana Agricultural University (CCS HAU) campus, in Hisar, India. Established in 1971, it caters to the children of CCS HAU employees and students from nearby areas.

== History ==
The school was inaugurated on 14 November 1971 by the then Finance Minister, Om Prakash Jain. Mrs. S. Verma was the first principal. The school received Central Board of Secondary Education (CBSE) accreditation in July 1972. The school has a big open-air theatre and a big auditorium, mainly, used for prayers.

== Notable alumni ==
- Arvind Kejriwal, social activist, Chief Minister of Delhi and Ramon Magsaysay Award winner
- Naveen Jindal, former Member of Parliament, current Chairman of Jindal Steel and Power Limited and Chancellor of O. P. Jindal Global University
- Pawan Chopra actor
- Saina Nehwal, winner of World Junior Badminton Championship, Indonesia Open, Singapore Open and Rajiv Gandhi Khel Ratna award
- Sugandh Rakha angel investor
- Yash Tonk, movie and TV actor
- Girish Nagpal, Entrepreneur, Founder of MetroRide, SharkTank fame, TEDx Speaker.

== See also ==
- List of schools in Hisar
- List of universities and colleges in Hisar
- List of institutions of higher education in Haryana
