= National Research Centre on Plant Biotechnology, Hisar =

Indian biotech research centre

College of Biotechnology, Hisar
- Type: Public
- Established: 2000
- Affiliations: []
- Location: Hisar, Haryana, India; 29.14°N 75.70°E
- Campus: Urban
- Website: cpbhisar.org

College of Biotechnology, Hisar (CPB), a collaborator of ICAR, is responsible for the research, genetic diversity analysis, propagation of tissue culture technology, training and mass propagation of planting material of newly developed fruits, crop varieties and rare medicinal, horticultural, forest, ornamental and other plant species. It is located next to HARSAC within the CCS Haryana Agricultural University, Hisar in the Haryana state of India.

It also offers plant biotechnology training on its own, as well as masters and doctoral research degrees in association with CCS HAU.

== History ==
It was set up in 2000 as the "Centre for Research and Applications in Plant Tissue Culture" with Government of India's funding, taken over by the Government of Haryana in 2005, and renamed as "Centre for Plant Biotechnology" in 2007 with enhanced responsibilities and research scope.

== Plant Information Centres ==
CPB has Plant Information Centres in Haryana at the following institutes:

- PCB main campus at Hisar within CCS HAU
- Deenbandhu Chhotu Ram University of Science and Technology (DCRUST)
- GJU Hisar
- Chaudhary Devi Lal University, Sirsa
- BPS Women's University, Sonepat

== See also ==
- List of universities and colleges in Hisar
- List of institutions of higher education in Haryana
- List of agricultural universities and colleges
- List of think tanks in India
