= Dayanand College, Hisar =

College in Hisar, Haryana, India

- Other names: DN College, Hisar
- Motto: तमसो मा ज्योतिर्गमय
- Motto in English: Lead me from darkness to light.
- Type: Not-for-profit trust
- Established: 1 June 1950
- Affiliations: D.A.V. College Managing Committee
- Academic affiliations: Guru Jambheshwar University of Science and Technology
- Academic staff: 159, 50 full time and 109 part-time
- Students: 6,000
- Location: Hisar, Haryana, India; 29.1585°N 75.7129°E
- Campus: Urban, 24 acres (9.7 ha)
- Website: www.dncollege.com

Dayanand College, Hisar is a public funded UGC recognized college, located in Hisar in the Indian state of Haryana. It is a conventional Degree college running all contemporary degree courses. The college is mainly famous for its Science stream.

== History ==
On 1 June 1950, the college was founded at Hisar by the not-for-profit private trust, by the efforts of its first principal and notable Arya Samaji Lala Gian Chand Mahajan (who later became Swami Munishwaranand), under the umbrella of D.A.V. College Managing Committee (founded 1886) on 24 acres land, with 4 acres for the main campus and another 20 acres few hundred meters away for other facilities, such as hostels, staff quarters, sports ground and indoor sports complex. In 1951, the college qualified for and started to receive UGC grants and aid.

In 1997, the college won the award of best college by the Department of Higher Education, Haryana.

Between 2006 and 2012, the college won the Zonal Youth Festival Championship five times.

During last 26 years, the college has been University Yoga Champion for 23 years in the annual competitions.

In 2016, the National Assessment and Accreditation Council graded and accredited the college as A class institute.

== Facilities ==
The college has 8625.76 sqm built-up area over 4 acres of the main campus and 12000.26 sqm built-up area for the hostels. The college also has 35 laboratories, library with 90000 books and 100 journals, computer center with 10 computers, wifi internet connection, 400 meters athletics track, a cricket stadium, hockey ground, basketball court, multipurpose indoor sports complex, dispensary and health center, separate boys and girls hostels, separate residential quarters for 26 staff and cafeteria. Out of 159 permanent, temporary and casual teaching staff, a total of 37 have PhD qualifications.

== Details ==
The college offers the various undergraduate (BA, BSc, BCom, BCA and BBA) and post-graduate courses (MA, MCom, MSC and MCA) in arts, science, commerce, business, computer and electronics. As of July 6, 2026, the college as 6,000, with 4,300 male (72%) and 1,700 female (28%) student.

29 Undergraduate courses - three years full time courses with 43 subject combinations:

- Bachelor of Arts
- Bachelor of Arts (honors) in English
- Bachelor of Commerce
- Bachelor of Science
- Bachelor of Business Administration
- Bachelor of Computer Application
- Bachelor of Mass Communication

6 Postgraduate courses - two years full time courses:

- Master of Arts
- Master of Commerce
- Master of Science (Geography)
- Master of Science (Mathematics)
- Master of Science (Biotechnology)

PhD and research courses - two years full time courses:

- College faculty is university approved centre for supervising the PhD and MPhil research and students.

Vocational courses, 3 month certificate, month diploma and one year advanced diploma in the following:

- Diploma in Computer Maintenance and Networking, 60 seats
- Hardware and Networking of Computers, 40 Seats
- Internet and Web Designing, 40 Seats
- TV and VCR Repair, 40 Seats
- Retailing Management, 40 Seats

== Notable alumni ==
The college has produced several thousand notable politicians, achievers, sports person, businessmen.

- Ajay Chautala, MP and MLA
- Kamal Gupta, MLA
- Prem Chand Gupta, RJD MP from Jharkhand
- Joginder Sharma, Indian national team cricketer and the captain of Haryana Cricket Team
- Karmveer Choudhary, actor

== See also ==
- List of Universities and Colleges in Hisar
- List of schools in Hisar
- List of institutions of higher education in Haryana
