= CSBF =

CSBF may refer to:

- Canadian Stage Band Festival, now MusicFest Canada
- Central Sheep Breeding Farm, in Hisar, Haryana, India
- Columbia Scientific Balloon Facility, a NASA facility responsible for providing support for unmanned, high altitude balloons
- Commission for the Supervision of Banking and Finance (French: Commission de Supervision Bancaire et Financaire), Madagascar
