= Chhaju Ram College of Education, Hisar =

College in Haryana, India

- Other names: CRCE, Hisar
- Type: aided
- Academic affiliations: Guru Jambheshwar University of Science and Technology
- Principal: Chander prabha
- Location: Hisar, Haryana, India; 29.1503°N 75.7223°E
- Campus: Urban
- Website: crcoehsr.ac.in

Chhaju Ram College of Education, Hisar is a college located on Delhi road in Hisar in the Indian state of Haryana.

== History ==
This privately funded and not-for-profit trust run institute has its origins in the philanthropic legacy of the prominent Jat businessman Seth Chhaju Ram (1881-1945) who made fortune in Calcutta during the British Raj. The college is run by the non-profit Jat Educational Institutions society, which also runs CRM JAT College, Chhaju Ram Law College, Hisar, Chhaju Ram Jat Senior Secondary School, Hisar and Chhaju Ram Public School, Hisar.

== Academics ==
BEd degree offered.

== See also ==
- List of Universities and Colleges in Hisar
- List of schools in Hisar
- List of institutions of higher education in Haryana
