= Haryana Space Applications Centre, Hisar =

Research institute in Hisar, Haryana, India

- HARSAC
- Type: Public
- Established: 1986; 40 years ago
- Affiliations: ISRO
- Officer in charge: Dr. R.S. Hooda
- Chairman: Sh. Vikas Gupta, IAS
- Academic staff: 27
- Administrative staff: 8
- Postgraduates: 8
- Location: Hisar, Haryana, India; 29.14°N 75.70°E
- Campus: Urban
- Area: located within the CCS HAU, Hisar
- Nickname: HARSAC
- Website: www.harsac.org

Haryana Space Applications Centre, Hisar (HARSAC), a collaborator of ISRO, is a nodal agency for Remote Sensing and GIS applications of the Government of Haryana. It is located next to Centre for Plant Biotechnology (PCB) within the CCS Haryana Agricultural University, Hisar in the Haryana state of India. It provides various remote sensing applications such as in monitoring agriculture, forestry, water resources, illegal constructions and encroachments, stubble burning and pollution monitoring, and revival of Saraswati River.

It also offers MTech degree in association with GJU Hisar University.

== Controversies ==
In 2016, environmental activists accused a Senior Scientist of HARSAC for allegedly helping builders in encroaching upon a part of a 27 km long seasonal rivulet in Gurugram, subsequently a departmental inquiry was conducted by the Director of the HARSAC. Another complaint before the Haryana Lokayukta against the HARSAC for allegedly providing favourable reports to the financial interests of unauthorised was disposed off after it was taken back by the complainant.

== See also ==
Lists

- List of universities and colleges in Hisar
- List of Indian satellites
- List of foreign satellites launched by India
- List of ISRO missions
- List of government space agencies
- Index of aerospace engineering articles

Topics

- Timeline of Solar System exploration

Organisations

- Department of Space
- Indian Institute of Remote Sensing
- Indian Institute of Space Science and Technology
- National Remote Sensing Centre
- Space Research and Remote Sensing Organization
