= Space Applications Centre (disambiguation) =

The Space Applications Centre is an Indian research institution in Ahmedabad, India.

Space Applications Centre may also refer to:

- Haryana Space Applications Centre, Hisar (HARSAC), India
- North-Eastern Space Applications Centre, Meghalaya, India
- European Centre for Space Applications and Telecommunications

== See also ==
- Indian Space Research Organisation (ISRO)
