= St. Thomas Church, Hisar =

St. Thomas' Church
- St. Thomas' Methodist Church
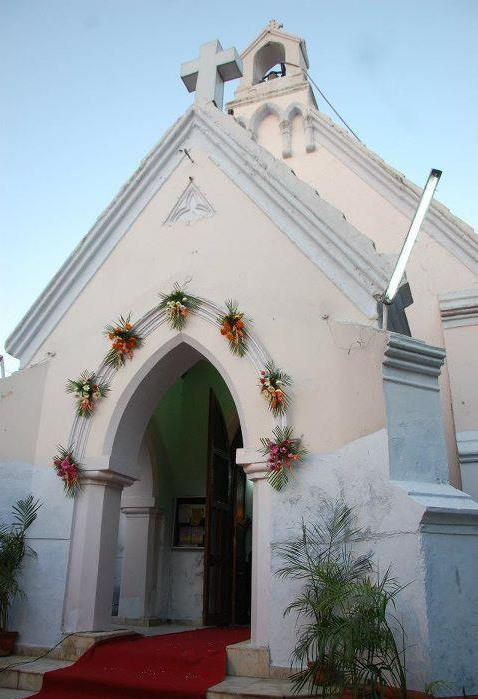
- Entrance of the church

- Location in Hisar, Haryana
- 29°08′55″N 75°43′25″E
- Location: Hisar, Haryana
- Country: India
- Denomination: Methodist
- Churchmanship: Anglican
- Website: http://dioceseofdelhi.org/

History
- Status: Church
- Founded: 3 December 1860
- Founder: George Edward Lynch Cotton
- Dedication: Thomas the Apostle
- Dedicated: May 1864
- Consecrated: 31 December 1865

Architecture
- Functional status: Active
- Heritage designation: Historical Monument by INTACH
- Style: Victorian
- Groundbreaking: 3 December 1860
- Completed: May 1864
- Construction cost: INR 4500

Specifications
- Capacity: 40
- Length: 53 ft (16 m)
- Width: 25 ft (7.6 m)
- Materials: Wood, tiles

Administration
- District: Hisar

Clergy
- Bishop: Bishop Subodh C Mondal
- Vicar: Rev Isaac P. Mann District Superintendent

St. Thomas' Church is located in Hisar city of Haryana, India. It is located in central part of Hisar near railway station. It has been declared as a historical monument by Indian National Trust for Art and Cultural Heritage. The Church is dedicated to St. Thomas, one of the 12 main disciples of Jesus Christ.

== History ==
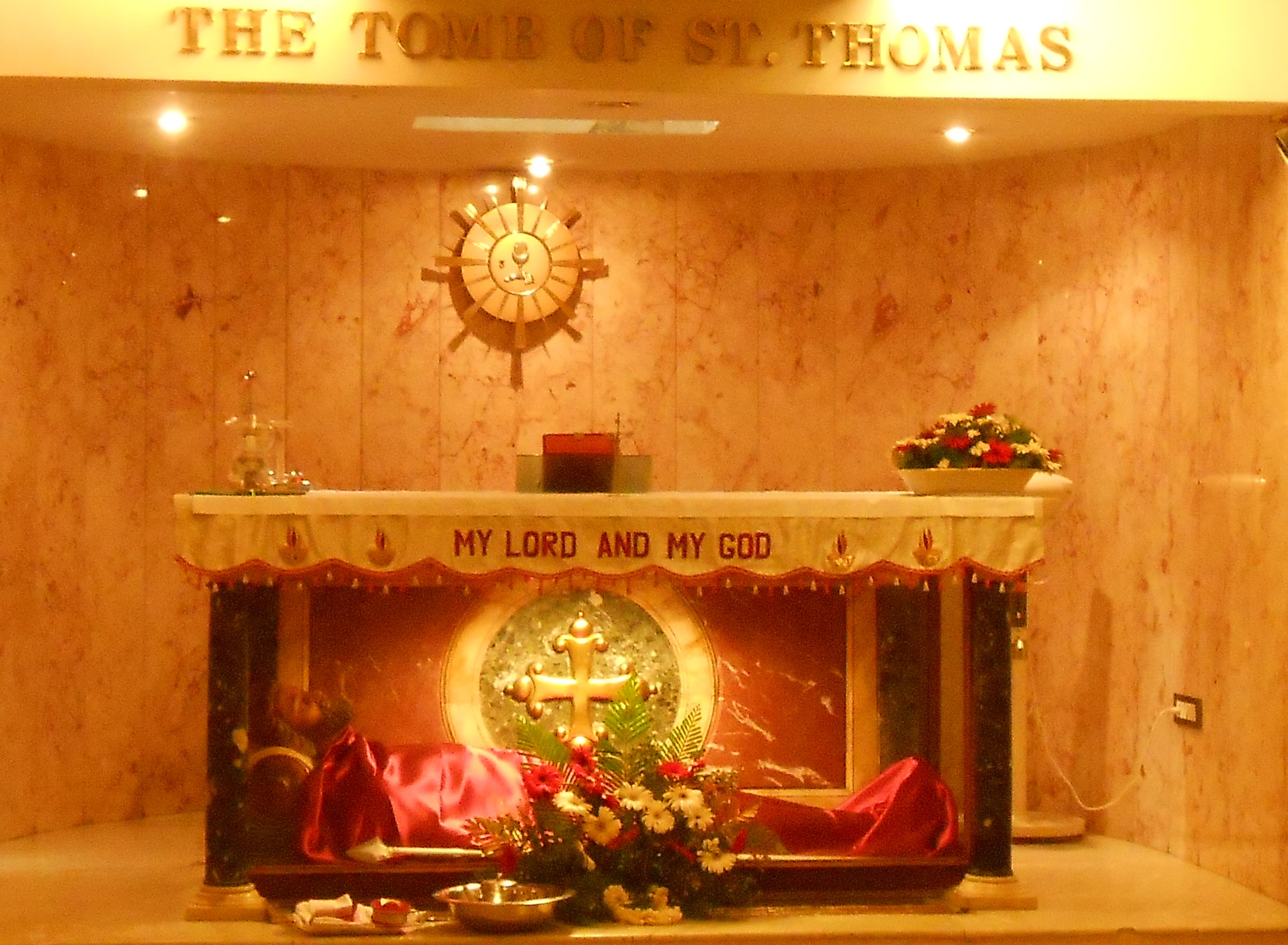
The tomb of St. Thomas the Apostle in Mylapore, India.

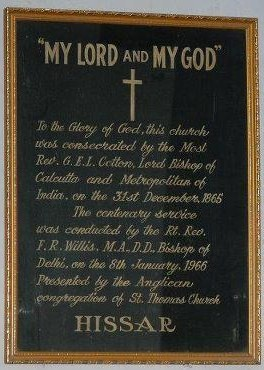
Plaque at St. Thomas Church, Hisar

Thomas is traditionally believed to have sailed to India in AD 52 to spread the Christian faith, and is believed to have landed at the port of Muziris, Tamilakam (modern-day North Paravur and Kodungalloor in modern-day Kerala state) where there was a Jewish community at the time. The port was destroyed in 1341 due to a massive flood that realigned the coasts. He is believed by the St Thomas Christian tradition to have established Ezharappallikal or Seven and Half Churches in Kerala. These churches are at Kodungallur, Palayoor, Kottakkavu (Paravur), Kokkamangalam, Niranam, Nilackal (Chayal), Kollam and Thiruvithamcode (half church).

Methodism is a group of historically related denominations of Protestant Christianity which derive their inspiration from the life and teachings of John Wesley (1703-1791). It originated as a Christian revival within the 18th-century Church of England and became a separate Christian Church after Wesley's death in 1791. Because of vigorous missionary activity, the movement spread throughout the British Empire including the british Raj, the United States, and beyond, today claiming approximately 80 million adherents worldwide.

In 1856, the Methodist Episcopal Church From America started mission in India. The Methodist Church in India began its work in 1856, when William Butler came from America. He selected Oudh and Rohilkhand as the field of effort, and being unable to secure a residence at Lucknow, began work at Bareilly. The first War of Independence broke up the work at Bareilly, but in 1858 Lucknow was occupied and Bareilly re-occupied and the work of the Mission started anew. and It was only in 1870, with the arrival of William Taylor, the famous evangelist, who led revival meetings in India that, Methodism became a national factor.

The proposal for building the Methodist church in Hisar was put up in 1860. Construction started on 3 December 1860 and was completed in May, 1864 at a cost of 4500 rupees. The church was consecrated by George Edward Lynch Cotton, Bishop of Calcutta on 31 December 1865. Till 1899, the worship in the church was restricted to Christians only. The Church and accompanying graveyard were handed over to the Methodist Church in Southern Asia in 1950 by the Central Public Works Department, India. The centenary service was conducted by R. Rev. F. R. Willis, Bishop of Delhi on 8 January 1966.

== Architecture ==
The church is built in Victorian style of architecture. The ceiling is covered with wooden panel. The main structure consists of an altar, a baptistry, a pulpit and two vestries. The pulpit of the church is adorned with velvet curtains. The floor of the church is made up of geometrical tiles. A graveyard is also located near the entrance of the church.

== Structures ==
The main hall cover an area of 1325 square feet and can accommodate around 40 people. The walls of the hall are 2 feet thick. The bell is another feature of the church. It was made at Roorkee in 1874. The graveyard is located near the entrance to the church. It contains graves of the John Wedderburn, collector of Hisar and his family who were killed by the rebels during Indian Rebellion of 1857.

== Krantiman Park ==
It is the oldest park in the city of Hisar and is a part of St. Thomas' Church Complex. It was built by East India Company and was then known as Company Bagh. A memorial was built here in 1857 in the memory of John Wedderburn and other people killed during the Indian Rebellion of 1857. In all 23 Europeans and Christians were murdered, 12 at Hissar and 11 at Hansi. There is a pillar with the names of the people killed on all sides. Due to the presence of pillar, the park was from then onwards known as Laat Bagh as Laat was the local word used for a pillar. The renovation of the park was done by Yudhvir Malik, Deputy Commissionerof Hisar in 1983. A bust of Chandra Shekhar Azad was erected in the park in 1984 and it was renamed as Krantiman Park. The park was inaugurated by Bhajan Lal, Chief Minister of Haryana on 11 July 1984.

== Administration ==
The church was officially handed over by the Govt. of India to the Methodist Church in Southern Asia in 1950 but the archdiocese of Malankara Orthodox Syrian Church and Anglican Diocese of Delhi (now under Haryana Dioceses after its creation) also hold worship services in the Church. The Methodist District Superintendent & Pastor-in-charge is The Rev. Isaac P. Mann. It is a part of the denomination Methodist Church in India. The Resident & Presiding Bishop of the Methodist Church for Delhi Area is Bishop Subodh C. Mondal. The archbishop of the archdiocese of Malankara Orthodox Syrian Churchis Metropolitan Job Mar Philoxenos and the CNI bishop is the Rt. Rev. Dr. Paul Swarup.

== Nearby Attractions ==
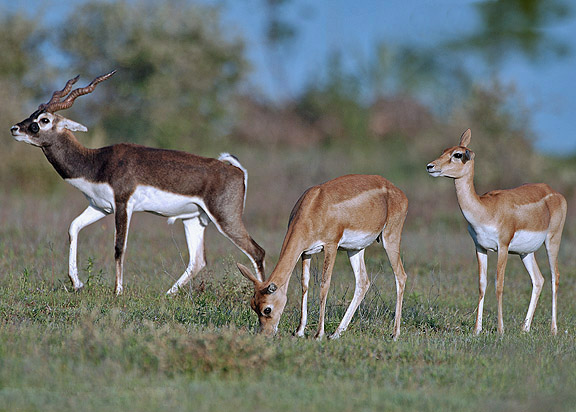
Blackbuck female deer

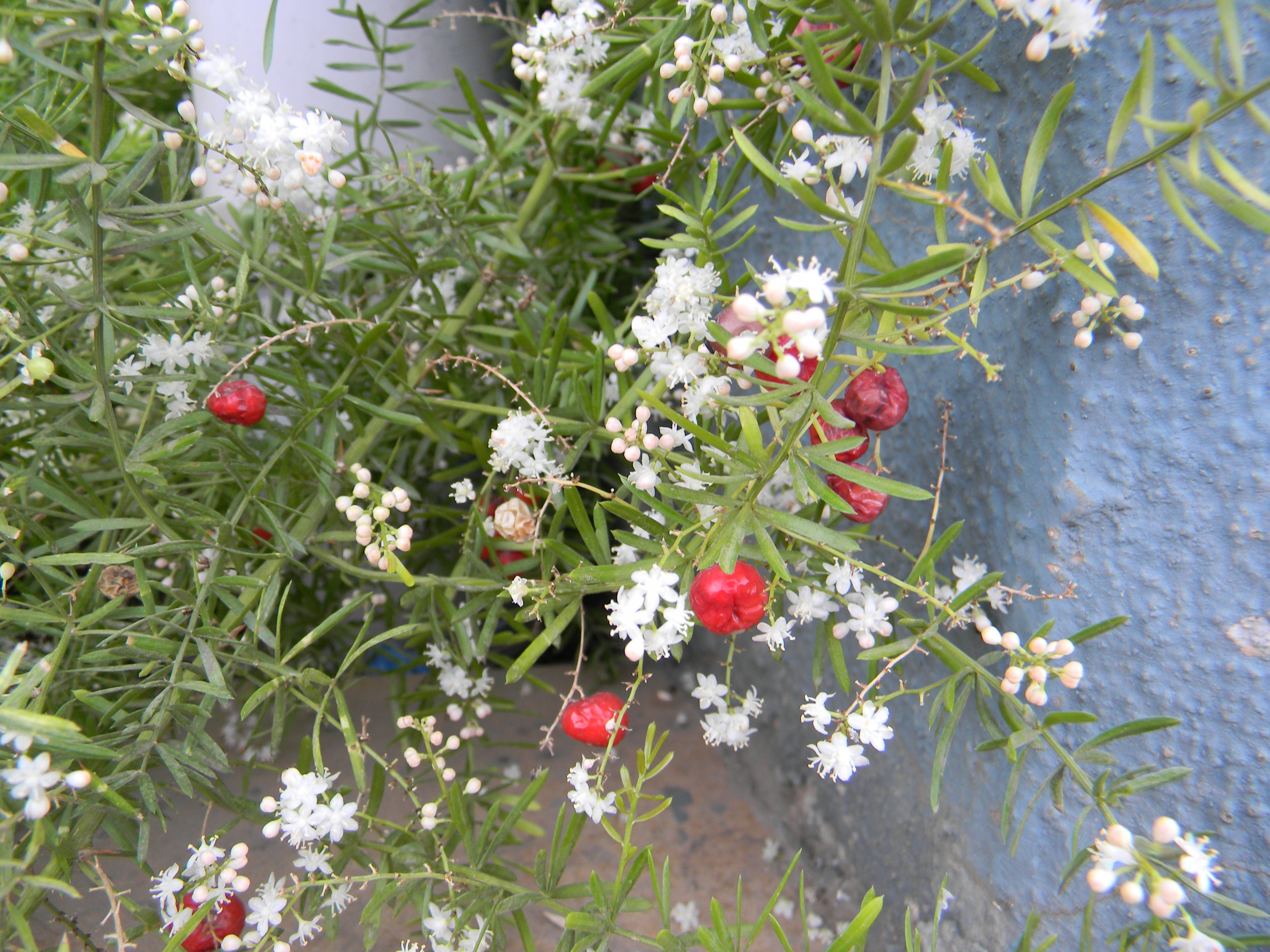
Shatavar Endangered Ayurvedic Herb

- Asigarh Fort at hansi
- Kanwari Indus Valley Mound at Kanwari
- Tosham rock inscription at Tosham
- Blue Bird Lake Hisar on National Highway 9 (NH9)
- Deer Park, Hisar (Hindi: हिरण उद्यान, हिसार, हरयाणा) on Dhansu Road
- Shatavar Vatika Herbal Park, Hisar - it is next to Deer Park, Hisaron Dhansu Road
- Guru Jambheshwar University of Science and Technology on National Highway 9 (NH9)
- Feroze Shah's Palace And Fort with Gujari Mahal, Lat Ki Masjid & Ashokan Pillar
- Krantiman Park with monument of British people who were killed during Indian Rebellion of 1857
- Hisar Airport

== See also ==
- St. Thomas' Church (disambiguation)
- Methodist Church in India
- Church of North India
- Christianity in India
- Haryana Tourism
- List of National Parks & Wildlife Sanctuaries of Haryana, India
- List of Monuments of National Importance in Haryana
- List of State Protected Monuments in Haryana
- List of Indus Valley Civilization sites in Haryana
- List of national parks of India
- Wildlife sanctuaries of India
