= Lala Lajpat Rai University of Veterinary and Animal Sciences =

University in Hisar, Haryana, India

Coordinates: 29.146813°N 75.710393°E

Lala Lajpat Rai University of Veterinary & Animal Sciences
- Type: Public
- Established: 2010
- Affiliations: UGC
- Chancellor: Governor of Haryana
- Vice-Chancellor: Vinod Kumar Verma
- Location: Hisar, Haryana, India
- Campus: Urban
- Website: www.luvas.edu.in

Lala Lajpat Rai University of Veterinary & Animal Sciences (LUVAS) is a university, named after the freedom fighter Lala Lajpat Rai, located on NH-52 in Hisar city of Haryana state in India. It is located immediate north of Hisar Airport and adjacent to the Central Sheep Breeding Farm, 15 km northeast of Hisar Bus Stand and 17 km north of Hisar Junction railway station.

== History ==
The College of Veterinary Sciences was shifted to Hisar from Lahore in 1948. It became a part of Chaudhary Charan Singh Haryana Agricultural University in 1971. It has now been established as a university and the college has become a part of the university.

=== Construction ===
The 1125-acre campus is constructed at the cost of INR 629 cr, including first phase costing INR 143 cr and second phase of INR 486 cr. In the Phase-I, Administrative block and the college of daily science were constructed. In the Phase-II, road, sewage treatment plant, boys hostel, girls hostel, sports complex & student activity center, 100 houses for staff, veterinary college, veterinary hospital, research labs & diagnostic facilities, campus school, postmortem block, STP, water treatment plant, stud farm, automatic milking plant and dairy plant, livestock farms (buffalo farm, cow farm, goat farm, sheep farm, pig farm, poultry farm), massage parlor for animals were completed. Advanced Research Centre has been planned and awaiting funding approval as of 2025.

=== Archaeological site ===
Bir Babran archaeological site is located to the north of the Lala Lajpat Rai University of Veterinary and Animal Sciences (LUVAS) campus in Hisar, and is a distinct mound separate from other well-known sites in the region like Bhirrana. While it is not as extensively documented in public records as some other major Indus-Sarasvati Valley Civilisation sites, its existence is recognized by local government and academic circles. The site is a part of the larger historical landscape of Hisar, which has a rich archaeological heritage, with many mounds dotting the surrounding area. The name "Bir Babran" refers to a specific archaeological mound and is often associated with the local forested area known as Bir Hisar. The site's location on the edge of the university campus has protected it from modern development, preserving it as a potentially significant source of information for understanding the ancient history and settlement patterns of the region. The mound is yet to be studied or excavated.

== Academics ==
The university currently offers undergraduate and postgraduate, from diploma to doctorate, in Veterinary and Animal science.

== Regional Research Centres ==
LUVAS has following five Regional Research Centres (RRC) in various stages of planning and operation:

- LUVAS Regional Research Centre, Riwasa (LRRC, Riwasa) at Riwasa, Mahendragarh
- LUVAS Regional Research Centre, Keorak (LRRC, Keorak) at Keorak, Kaithal
- LUVAS Regional Research Centre, Karnal (LRRC, Karnal) at Karnal
- LUVAS Regional Research Centre, Jhajjar (LRRC, Jhajjar)
- LUVAS Regional Research Centre, Narnaund (LRRC, Narnaund) at Narnaund in Hisar district

== Affiliated Private Institutes and Colleges ==
=== Affiliated for B.V.Sc. & A. H. Degree Programme ===
1. International Institute of Veterinary Education and Research (IIVER), NH 10, near Vill. Bahu Akbarpur, 10 Mile Stone Rohtak by pass, Rohtak 124001, Haryana.
2. Sanskaram College of Veterinary and Animal Science, Kheri Taluka, Patauda, Jhajjar
3. RPS College of Veterinary Sciences, Satnali Road, Balana, Mahendergarh
4. M. R. College of Veterinary Science V.P.O Hassanpur, Tehsil & Distt. Jhajjar.

== See also ==
- State University of Performing And Visual Arts
- State Institute of Film and Television
- List of Universities and Colleges in Hisar
- List of institutions of higher education in Haryana
- List of think tanks in India
