= Anthony Leocadia Fletcher =

Indian civil servant

- Born: 9 December 1909; Kerala
- Died: 14 December 1974 (aged 65)
- Occupation: Indian Civil Servant
- Spouse: Patricia Fletcher
- Parent(s): Peter Fletcher and Helen Fletcher

Anthony Leocadia Fletcher (9 December 1909 – 14 December 1974) was an Indian civil servant. He was the first vice-chancellor of Chaudhary Charan Singh Haryana Agricultural University and the founder of Campus School CCS HAU, Hisar.

== Early life and education ==
Anthony Leocadia Fletcher, son of Peter Fletcher and Helen Fletcher, was born on 9 December 1909 in a Christian family of Kerala. He completed his school education from St. Joseph's Higher Secondary School, Trivandrum. He did his B.Sc. from University of Madras and M.Sc. from University of Nagpur. Then he went to School of Oriental Studies for further education and joined as an Indian civil servant in London.

== Career ==
- Between 1933 and 1947, he served in Punjab as Deputy Commissioner and as District and Sessions Judge.
- He was also appointed as Secretary in the Department of Industries, Medicine, Labour and Transport of local Government, Legal Remembrance.
- Between 1954 and 1958, he served as Commissioner of Jullundur Division.
- Between 1954 and 1958, he was also appointed as Financial Commissioner (Revenue, Rehabilitation, Excise and Taxation).
- Between 1958 and 1960, he started Dandakaranya Project as its Chief Administrator.
- Between 1960 and 1963, he was the Financial Commissioner, Development in Punjab.
- Between 1963 and 1968, he was the Financial Commissioner, Revenue in Punjab.

Fletcher was appointed the first Vice-chancellor of Chaudhary Charan Singh Haryana Agricultural University on 29 March 1970 and served until his death on 14 December 1974. He was also the founder of Campus School CCS HAU, Hisar present inside the university premises, a school that caters to the children of university employees. The administrative block of the university is named after him as Fletcher Bhawan. Nomenee Robinson, Michelle Obama's uncle has worked under him in 1961. He also served as president of Indian Agricultural Universities Association between 1972 and 1973.

== Personal life ==
Fletcher was married to Patricia Fletcher and had one son and two daughters.

== See also ==
- Chaudhary Charan Singh Haryana Agricultural University
- Campus School CCS HAU, Hisar
- List of Indian members of the Indian Civil Service
- Indian Civil Service
