= National Research Centre on Equines =

Research institute in Hisar, Haryana, India

- Nickname: NRCE
- Established: 7 January 1986
- Research type: Applied
- Field of research: Equines
- Director: Dr. B.N. Tripathi
- Faculty: 31
- Location: Hisar, Haryana, 125001, India; 29.187011°N 75.701251°E
- Campus: 200 acres (0.81 km^{2})
- Operating agency: Indian Council of Agricultural Research
- Website: nrce.nic.in

The National Research Centre on Equines (NRCE) was established during 7th five-year plan under the aegis of Indian Council of Agricultural Research for research on equine health and production considering the importance of equines in India.

== History: Main campus at Hisar ==
After the initial joining of the Project Director at ICAR headquarters on 26 November 1985, the Centre became operational at Hisar on 7 January 1986 for conducting researches and for providing effective health coverage for equines. In 1989, the Bikaner branch was opened. In 2024, another such centre in the south was planned. In December 2010, a Kissan Call Centre was started.

== NRCE ==
=== Objective ===
- To undertake research on health and production management in equines.
- To develop diagnostic/biologicals for major equine diseases and to act as national referral facilities for diagnosis, surveillance and monitoring of equine diseases and to provide diagnostic, advisory and consultancy service.

=== Campuses ===
==== Hisar campus ====
Hisar is main campus.

==== Bikaner campus ====
The National Research Centre on equines, Bikaner Campus was established on September 28, 1989 for conducting research for improving the technologies for optimization of production potential of the equines. The campus has state-of-art laboratories for conducting research in equine genetics, nutrition, medicine, reproduction and management. The Centre has the responsibility on generation of technologies for augmenting equine performance in order to uplift the socio-economic status of poor equine owners. Conservation and propagation of equines through ecotourism has recently been initiated. The elite Marwari of Rajasthan, Kathiawari horses of Gujarat, Zanskari horses of Ladakh and Manipuri horses of Manipur and Poitou donkeys of France are bred here. An Equine Information Centre and a Museum has been developed for the depicting the basic technical details about the horses. Cryopreservation of semen, artificial insemination, ultrasonography and endoscopy of equines is routinely carried out here.

== See also ==
- List of Universities and Colleges in Hisar
- List of institutions of higher education in Haryana
- List of think tanks in India
