= Kaul, Kaithal =

Kaul
- village
- Location within Haryana Location within India
- Coordinates: 29°50′46″N 76°39′39″E
- Country: India
- State: Haryana
- District: Kaithal
- Sub-tehsil: Dhand

Population (2011)
  - Total: 12,826
- Time zone: UTC+5:30 (IST)
- PIN: 136021
- Telephone code: 01746
- ISO 3166 code: IN-HR
- Vehicle registration: HR-08
- Sex ratio: 820 ♂/♀
- Literacy: 73.44%
- Parliamentary constituency: Kurukshetra
- Assembly constituency: Pundri
- Website: haryana.gov.in

Kaul is a panchayat village in the Pundri tehsil of Kaithal district of Haryana, India. Earlier it formed part of the Kurukshetra and Karnal districts. Kaul is 38 km by road northwest of the city of Karnal, 32 km by road southwest of the town of Kurukshetra and 5 km by road southeast of the village of Dhand, where the nearest railway station is located.

The population of Kaul village was 12,826 in 2011, which was almost five times the average size for villages in the district. Kaul is relatively well-developed and often thought of as a town. The infrastructure is well-developed, including a nearby 220 kv power station.

An old fort survives in a now-uninhabited part of the village and ascetics and saints stay there. Folklore has it that the wheel of Karna's chariot got stuck at that spot during his final fight with Arjuna in Mahabharat. Historically, Kaul was a major center of learning. A famous Sanskrit Mahavidyalaya joined the ashram of Kapil Muni, one of the most learned and revered Hindu sages of ancient India. Kapil Muni was mentioned by Krishna during the sermon of Gita to Arjuna in Mahabharat. The village has a Surya Kund (a sacred tank dedicated to the Sun God).

== Education ==
Kaul has many schools and two colleges. Kaul has College of Agriculture and Regional Research Station (Rice) which are part of Chaudhary Charan Singh Haryana Agricultural University (CCSHAU) . The Kaul campus of the CCSHAU focuses its research on wheat and rice. Apart from agricultural education, Babu Anant Ram Janta College and united college of education confers degrees. many students of village had been studied in national institute like NIT's and IIT's.

== Notables ==
- Balwant Singh, Arjun Awardee, former captain of Indian national volleyball team
- Ishwar Singh, former speaker of Haryana Legislative Assembly
- Makhan Singh, former speaker of Haryana Legislative Assembly, MLA
- Amit Malaan, Former NCC Air Wing Cadet who attended the All India Vayu Sainik Camp in Bangalore in 2010
