= Megh R. Goyal =

- Born: Sangrur district, Punjab, India
- Education: Chaudhary Charan Singh Haryana Agricultural University
- Occupations: Agricultural and Biomedical Engineer
- Known for: Father of Irrigation Engineering in Puerto Rico
- Spouse: Subhadra Goyal
- Children: 3

Megh R. Goyal is an engineer and professor in Puerto Rico, and a Methodist pastor. He has been called the father of irrigation engineering in Puerto Rico.

== Education ==
Goyal earned his high school diploma from Prem Sabha High School in Sangrur; B.Sc. degree in Agricultural Engineering from Punjab Agricultural University, Ludhiana - India; M.Sc. degree (1977) and Ph.D. (1979) from Ohio State University, Columbus, Ohio; and Master of Divinity (2001) from Puerto Rico Evangelical Seminary, Hato Rey – Puerto Rico.

== Career ==
Goyal has worked as a soil conservation inspector, research assistant and lecturer at Haryana Agricultural University, research associate at the Ohio State University, and research agricultural engineer at the Agricultural Experiment Station of University of Puerto Rico - Mayaguez Campus. He was the first agricultural engineer to receive a professional license in agricultural engineering in 1971, from the Institution of Engineers (India), and in 1986, from College of Engineers & Surveyors of Puerto Rico. For his pioneering work on micro-irrigation, he is known as a "Drip Irrigation Man" in Puerto Rico.

Goyal is currently a retired professor of agricultural engineering and biomedical engineering at the College of Engineering of the University of Puerto Rico - Mayaguez Campus and senior editor-in-chief for Apple Academic Press.

Goyal has authored journal articles and text books such as: "Introduction to Agriclimatology", Management of Drip/trickle or Micro Irrigation, and Biofluid Dynamics of Human Body Systems

On 16 September 2005, Goyal was named "Father of Irrigation Engineering in Puerto Rico for the 20th Century" by the ASABE – Puerto Rico Section, for his pioneer work on irrigation, evapotranspiration, climatology, and soil and water engineering.

== Personal life ==
Goyal was born in Punjab in India. His late parents were natives of Punjab State. Goyal was married to Subhadra Goyal who was a Methodist pastor in Rincon, Puerto Rico. They have three children.
