= Jai Bhagwan Chaudhary =

Indian academic

J.B. Chaudhary (Jai Bhagwan Chowdhury) is a former Vice-Chancellor of Haryana Agricultural University and recipient of the Padma Shri award (2003). Later he was appointed as the Vice-Chancellor of G.B. Pant University of Agriculture and Technology, Pantnagar, Nainital. The Alumni Association of Pakistan Farm Scientists had conferred upon him the highest award, Mian M. Afzal Hussain Award. He has written few books. He is an elected fellow of the National Academy of Agricultural Sciences.
