= Balwant Singh (volleyball) =

Indian volleyball player

Balwant Singh (1945 – 14 November 2010), popularly known as Ballu, was an Indian volleyball player, considered a star of the India men's national volleyball team. His son Narender is a professional volleyball player who plays for the Indian volleyball Team. Kaul village panchayat also organised Balwant Singh Memorial tournament after his death in the village.

== Biography ==
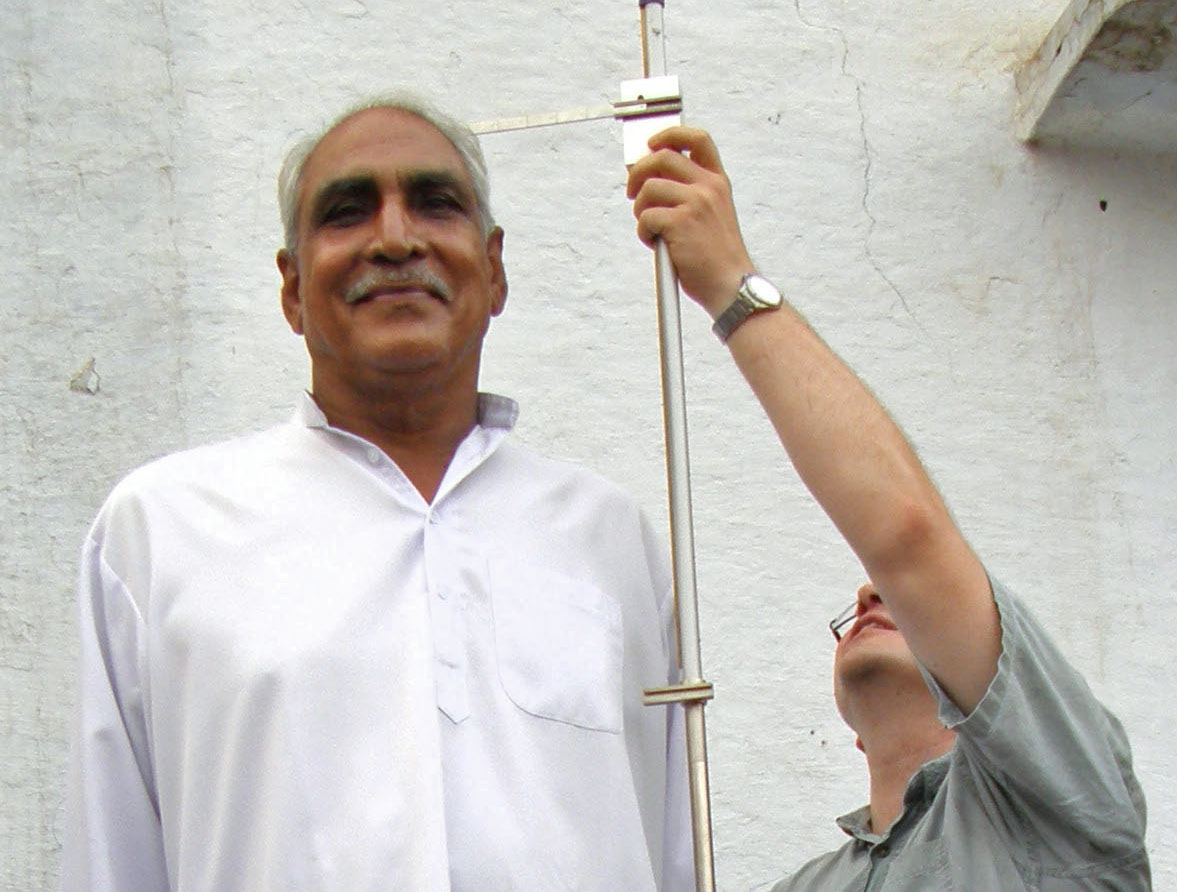
Balwant Singh Ballu in a photo

Balwant Singh was born in 1945 in the Kaul village of Haryana state's Kaithal district.He belonged to Ror Community.

=== Sporting career ===
Singh was a tall, ungainly youth. His height was 6 feet 6 inches (1.98 m) with correspondingly big hands and feet. He was from a modest background and joined the Border Security Force (BSF) in Jalandhar, Punjab, which had a reputation for producing quality volleyball players at the time.

In the mid-1960s and into the 1970s, he was responsible for helping Punjab achieve national success, and he was awarded the country's top sporting honor, the Arjuna Award, in volleyball in 1972 for his excellent sportsmanship and contribution to the national team. Singh played for India in Asian Games of 1970, 1974, and 1978. He also played test matches for India in 1970, 1978 and 1980.

The first National Volleyball Championship in which Singh took part was that of 1965, and he continued to play in the Nationals till 1988. Between 1968 and 1981, Punjab won National Championships 10 times largely due to the performance of Singh. He participated in the All India Police Games from 1966 to 1990 representing Punjab Police and BSF.

=== Death and legacy ===
Singh ran a volleyball academy in Kaul, and a stadium was named after him. He died in November 2010.
