= Northern Region Farm Machinery Training and Testing Institute =

Agricultural institute in Hisar, India

- Type: Public
- Established: 1963
- Parent institution: India Ministry of Agriculture & Farmers Welfare
- Academic affiliations: ICAR, UGC
- Academic staff: 81
- Location: Hisar, Haryana, India; 29.1915°N 75.70°E
- Campus: Urban
- Website: nrfmtti.gov.in

Northern Region Farm Machinery Training and Testing Institute, Hisar, is a public funded agricultural and farm training and testing institute located on Sirsa road, Hisar in the Indian state of Haryana. It is one of the four such institutes established by the Government of India's Ministry of Agriculture & Farmers Welfare. It has provided training to students hailing from all over India and more than 27 other nations and annual Krishi Darshan Expo is held at institute in October.

== History ==
In 1955, for the adoption of mechanized cultivation a Government of India initially set up the Central Agricultural Machinery Utilization Training Centre at Budhni in Madhya Pradesh. Three more regional Farm Machinery Training and Testing Institutes were set up at Hisar (1963) for the northern region, Garladinne in Anantapur district of Andhra Pradesh (1983) for the southern region and Biswanath Chariali in Assam (1990) for the eastern region. It is most important farm machinery training centre in the state of Haryana. It has 153.20 hectares campus. It offers testing, training and workshop in farm machinery. Facilities include farm, ~200 equipment, classrooms, library, rest house (eight bed), dispensary and hostel (150 students). It trains nearly 2,000 farmer, managers, academics and students every year.

== See also ==
- List of institutions of higher education in Haryana
- List of universities and colleges in Hisar
- List of agricultural universities and colleges
- List of think tanks in India
