= Chaudhary Charan Singh Haryana Agricultural University Sports Complex =

Multi-sports complex in Haryana, India

- गिरी क्रीड़ा केंद्र
- Chaudhary Charan Singh Haryana Agricultural University Sports Complex
- Full name: Giri Centre for Students' Welfare & Activities
- Address: CCS HAU, Hisar
- Location: Hisar, Haryana, India
- Owner: CCS HAU
- Operator: HAU
- Acreage: 8 Acres
- Public transit: Located on MDR107 highway, near to Hisar Junction railway station and Hisar Airport.

Construction
- Built: 1978
- Renovated: 2019-20
- Expanded: 2019-20

Tenants
- SAI, HAU

Website
- hau.ac.in

Giri Centre, or Chaudhary Charan Singh Haryana Agricultural University Sports Complex, is a multi-sports complex in the Chaudhary Charan Singh Haryana Agricultural University at Hisar, Haryana. It houses several SAI centres of excellence, stadiums and arenas for a variety of indoor and outdoor sports, and a sports hostel for the visiting and resident sportspersons.

It is located within the CCHAU campus just inside the CCS HAU Gate No. 3 on the MDR107 Balsamand road. Hisar Junction railway station (2.8 km), Hisar Airport (presently domestic, 7.3 km), Indira Gandhi International Airport (182 km), Chandigarh Airport (249 km) and NIS, Patiala (176 km) are the nearest major access points.

== Etymology ==
The sports complex is officially named as the Giri Centre which is named after the India's fourth president, Varahagiri Venkata Giri.

== History ==
The construction of Giri Centre started in 1975 and completed in 1978. A sports college was established here in 1978 which was disbanded in 1991 when SAI opened a regional sports training centre here.

In December 2018, the DSW of HAU Students' Welfare signed a partnership agreement with the JSW Group (Jindal Group) under which the Jindal Group will spend ₹100 million (equivalent to ₹150 million, US$1.5 million or €1.3 million in 2026) for the enhancement of sports infrastructure and appointment of the technical sports support experts to identify, nurture and develop the sports talent at the Giri Centre in Public–private partnership (PPP) mode.

== SAI Sports Training Centre ==
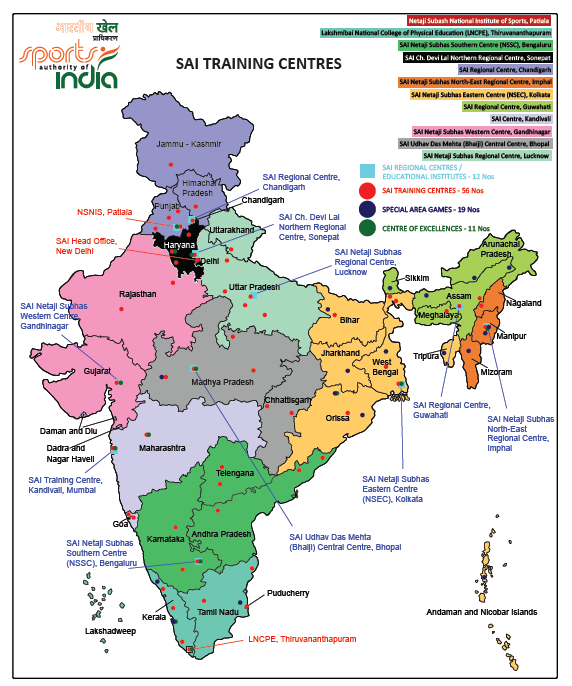
SAI Training Centres across India

SAI Sports Training Centre, HAU Hisar (SAI STC, Hisar), was established in 2001. To train sports persons, the Sports Authority of India (SAI) has established a "Sports Training Center" at HAU with the following "Centres of Excellence":

- Centre of Excellence for Athletics
- Centre of Excellence for Boxing
- Centre of Excellence for Hockey
- Centre of Excellence for Judo
- Centre of Excellence for Table Tennis
- Sakshi Malik Centre of Excellence for Wrestling, named after the Olympic medalist Sakshi Malik

== Facilities ==
The complex has the following facilities.

=== Outdoor stadiums and grounds ===
- Combined athletics track and hockey ground with spectators stands and synthetic track of international standards set by the International Association of Athletics Federations and International Hockey Federation
- Cricket ground
- Football ground
- Outdoor Olympic-size swimming pool with dive platforms of 3 varying heights

=== Indoor stadium and arena ===
- Two badminton courts with spectators stands of 600 seating capacity
- Two squash courts
- Two multipurpose halls
- Two gymnasiums
- Multiple hobby rooms

== Events ==
On 11 November 1975, the stadium hosted a first-class match during the Ranji Trophy tournament at the cricket stadium here between Haryana cricket team and Jammu and Kashmir cricket team.

From 1 to 10 February 2019, the national senior women's hockey championship was held at Giri Centre astroturf ground for the selection of the national team.

== Notable sports persons ==
Numerous HAU students and other non-HAU sports person who trained at Giri Centre has achieved fame at international level in the Asian Games, Commonwealth Games and Olympic Games.

=== HAU student sportspersons ===
The HAU students who trained here and became internal medal winners include:

- Gyan Singh
- Harcharan Singh
- O.P. Bhadu
- Uday Chand
- Jutsi
- Vijay Pal

=== Other sportspersons ===
Sportspersons who were not HAU students but trained here include:

==== Boxing ====
- Jai Bhagwan
- Manoj Kumar
- Saweety Boora

==== Hockey ====
- Poonam
- Savita Malik

==== Wrestling ====
- Geetika Jakhar
- Pooja Dhanda

== See also ==
- Mahabir Stadium
- List of Indoor arenas in India
- List of international cricket grounds in India
- List of stadiums in India
- List of stadiums in Asia
