= Commission for the Supervision of Banking and Finance =

Madagascar government agency

The Commission de Supervision Bancaire et Financière (CSBF), or Commission for the Supervision of Banking and Finance, is a Madagascar government agency that is responsible for directing the course of affairs of banking and finance in Madagascar. Its duties include providing for and supervising the Central Bank of Madagascar.

The Commission is defined by a 1995 law: "Loi No 95 - 030 (Law No. 95 -030) Relative to the activity and control of credit establishments".

== See also ==
- Politics of Madagascar
