= List of institutions of higher education in Hisar =

This is the list of universities and colleges in Hisar, previously spelled Hissar, in Hisar district in the state of Haryana in northwestern India.

== Universities in Hisar ==
- Chaudhary Charan Singh Haryana Agricultural University
- Guru Jambheshwar University of Science and Technology, established in 1995.
- Lala Lajpat Rai University of Veterinary & Animal Sciences, established in 2010.
- Om Sterling Global University, private university.
- Haryana Institute of Civil Aviation, Hisar Airport.

== Research Institutes ==
=== National Research Institutes ===
  - Central Sheep Breeding Farm
  - Central Institute for Research on Buffaloes (CIRB)
  - National Research Centre on Equines
  - National Research Centre on Plant Biotechnology, Hisar offers MTech in Plant Biotechnology

=== State Research Institutes ===
  - Government Livestock Farm, Hisar
  - Haryana Space Applications Centre, Hisar (HARSAC), offers MTech in Gio-Informatics
  - Indo-Israeli Centre of Excellence for Animal Husbandary & Dairying, Hisar at Government Livestock Farm, Hisar
  - Northern Region Farm Machinery Training and Testing Institute
  - Regional Fodder Station, Hisar

== Colleges in Hisar ==
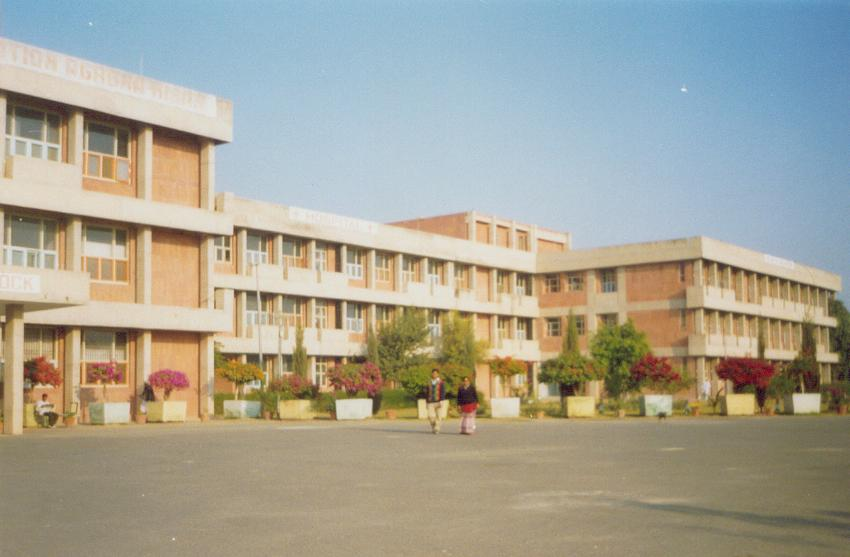
Maharaja Agrasen Institute Agroha

As of December 2019, there are 31 government degree colleges in Hisar district, 10 government and 21 private.

=== Degree colleges (govt) ===
There are 10 government degree colleges in Hisar district (c. December 2019).

- Government College, Adampur
- Government College, Barwala
- Government College, Data, establishment announced in fy2018–19
- Nehru Memorial Government College, Hansi
- Govt. Post Graduate College, Hisar
- Govt. College for Girls, Hisar
- Government College, Kheri Chaupta, establishment announced in 2018–19
- Government College, Nalwa
- Government College, Narnaund
- Government College Uklana, establishment announced in 2018–19

=== Degree colleges (private) ===
There are 21 private degree colleges in Hisar district (c. December 2019). Some of the oldest colleges are

- Akash Education Society
- CRM JAT College
- Chhaju Ram Law College, Hisar
- Chhaju Ram College of Education, Hisar
- Dayanand college
- Fateh Chand College for Women (Lahore), Hisar
- Imperial PG College
- Maharani Lakshmi Bai Post Graduate College, Bhiwani Rohilla, Hisar
- Manav Institute of Education, Hisar
- Mata Jiyo Devi College of Education, Khanda Kheri
- Shanti Niketan Vidyapeeth, Hisar

=== Degree college (sanskrit) ===
- Dayanand Brahm Mahavidyala, Hisar

=== Engineering and technology ===
Engineering

- Kalpana Chawla Institute of Engineering and Technology Chikanwas, Hisar
- OM Institute of OM Institute of Technology and Management, Hisar
- Manav Institute of Technology and Management, Jeora
- Prannath Parnami Institute of Management & Technology, Hisar
- Shanti Niketan Vidyapeeth, Hisar
- Shree Balaji Institute of Technology, Hisar
- Saraswati Institute of Technology, Hisar
- Vishwakarma Government College Of Engineering, Hisar

Polytechnic college

- Government Polytechnic, Hisar
- Government Polytechnic Adampur
- Shanti Niketan Vidyapeeth, Hisar

=== Medical ===
- Maharaja Agrasen Medical College, Agroha, MBBS, MS and MD

=== Nursing ===
- Indus College of Nursing, Khanda Kheri
- Maharaja Agrasen Medical College, Agroha: offers GNM
- Savitri Devi Jindal Institute of Nursing, Hisar

=== Paramedical ===
AYUSH

- National College of Ayurveda & Hospital Barwala Hisar Haryana 125121 the worst college

BioTechnology

- CCS Haryana Agricultural University: Department of Biochemistry offers PhD
- Guru Jambheshwar University of Science and Technology: offers Masters in BioTech

Homoeopathy

- Haryana Medical Institute, Hisar

=== Pharmacy ===
- Government Polytechnic Adampur
- Guru Jambheshwar University of Science and Technology: Faculty of Pharmaceutical Sciences offers MPhrama and BPharma
- Manav Group's Institute of Pharmacy: offers BPharma and DPharma
- Rajendra Institutes of Technology & Sciences: Technology: offers MPhrama and BPharma

=== Physiotherapy ===
- Guru Jambheshwar University of Science and Technology: Department of Physiotherapy offers Bachelors and master's degree
- Maharaja Agrasen Medical College, Agroha, Bachelors and master's degree

== See also ==
- List of schools in Hisar
- List of institutions of higher education in Haryana
