= Mahabir Stadium =

Sports venue in Hisar City, India

Mahavir Stadium
- Interactive map of Mahavir Stadium
- Former names: Nehru Stadium
- Location: Hisar
- Coordinates: 29.149716°N 75.717269°E
- Owner: Hisar District Olympic Association
- Capacity: 25,000
- Surface: Artificial turf
- Acreage: 14

Construction
- Opened: 1972
- Renovated: 1988

Mahavir Stadium, built in 1972, is a multipurpose sports complex located in Hisar city of Haryana, India. It has second largest capacity in Haryana, after the Shah Satnam Ji Cricket Stadium in Sirsa which has capacity of 35,000 spectators. It is owned and operated by the District Olympic Association of Hisar. The venue is used for several events, such as cricket and football.

In athletics, at least 40 national and 6 international athletes are from Hisar. In handball, at least 20 players from hisar have represented India at international level, among them at least 6 are from Ladwa. Though Hisar has produced large number of national and international players, and there at 4 universities and 31 degree colleges, there are no institutes offering courses such as B.P.Ed and M.P.Ed to develop sports coaches.

== History ==
It was built in 1972 and named as "Nehru Stadium" on its inauguration, renamed as the "Mahabir Stadium" in 1987, and renovated in 1988.

== Location ==
It located is about 5 km from the Guru Jambheshwar University of Science and Technology; 4 km from the Blue Bird Lake; 2 km from the bus station along the National Highway 9, 1 km from the town center & main market area; 1 km from Hisar Junction railway station; 6 km from the Hisar Airport; 167 km from the Indira Gandhi International Airport; 180 km from the New Delhi railway station; and 235 km from the Chandigarh International Airport.

== Infrastructure ==
The seating capacity of the stadium is 25,000 and provides facilities for athletics, basketball, boxing, football, gymnastics, judo, volleyball, wrestling and yoga. The stadium is lit with floodlights and more than 1000 players daily use it for practice.

=== Mahabir Stadium Boxing Academy ===
The Hisar Boxing Academy for male and female boxer is located at Mahabir stadium.

=== Mahabir Stadium Judo Academy ===
The Hisar Judo Academy, led by Dr. Sumer Singh Nandal, for male and female Judoka is located at Mahabir stadium. It is the biggest centre for Judo coaching in India.

=== Mahabir Stadium Wrestling Akhara ===
The Mahabir Stadium Boxing Academy for male and female wrestlers is located at Mahabir stadium.

== Events ==
It hosted the 2nd Asian Women's Boxing Championship in 2003 and 51st National Boxing Championship in 2004.

It also hosted 22nd Haryana State Women Sports Festival in 2008.

It also hosted Haryana State Master's Athelerics Championship in May 2014.

== Other stadiums in Hisar ==
- HAU Giri Centre
- Inspire Institute of Sport at CCS HAU Giri Centre
- GJU Sports Centre
- Hisar International Cricket Stadium: This is coming up in Satrod - east of Hisar.
- Dominence of Haryana in sports

== See also ==
- List of stadiums in India

== Nearby attraction ==
- Shatavar Vatika Herbal Park, Hisar is next to the Deer Park on Dhansu Road
- Blue Bird Lake Hisar
- Kanwari Indus Valley Mound at Kanwari
- Tosham rock inscription at Tosham
- Asigarh Fort at Hansi
- Firoz Shah Palace Complex
- Pranpir Badshah tomb at Hisar
- Deer Park, Hisar
- Haryana Tourism
