= Central Sheep Breeding Farm =

Agricultural research institute in Haryana, India

Central Sheep Breeding Farm, Hisar
- Type: Public
- Established: 1968; 58 years ago
- Parent institution: Government of Australia, Ministry of Agriculture & Farmers Welfare of India
- Academic affiliations: ICAR, UGC
- Director: Dr. Runtu Gogoi
- Academic staff: 213
- Administrative staff: 9
- Location: Hisar, Haryana, India; 29.2821°N 75.7255°E
- Campus: Urban, 2,456 acres (994 ha)
- Website: csbfhsr.com

Central Sheep Breeding Farm, Hisar is a public funded agricultural research, breeding and education institute located at Hisar in the Indian state of Haryana that offers educational courses in Shearing Training and Sheep Management & Production Training.

== History ==
It was established in 1968 as a collaboration between Government of Australia and India Ministry of Agriculture & Farmers Welfare.

== CSBF ==
=== Details ===
In 2015, it had sheep strength 4217 and goat strength of 481.

=== Facilities ===
In institute has facilities for imparting training, hostels for the farmer students, research and breeding farms, laboratories, etc. It has teaching and technical staff of 213 and 9 administrative staff.

== See also ==
- List of institutions of higher education in Haryana
- List of universities and colleges in Hisar
- List of agricultural universities and colleges
