= Government Livestock Farm, Hisar =

Government institute in Hisar, India

- Former names: The Camel Stud (from 1809 till 1854), Ordnance Cattle Farm (till 1912), Government Cattle Farm (till 1945), Government Livestock Farm (since 1945)
- Type: Public
- Established: 1809
- Founder: Major James Lumsdaine
- Parent institution: Government of Haryana
- Affiliations: ICAR
- Religious affiliation: Secular
- Location: Hisar, Haryana, 131027, India; 29.1924°N 75.6933°E
- Campus: Urban
- Language: English, Hindi
- Website: http://pashudhanharyana.gov.in/html/schemes_livestockfarm.htm

Government Livestock Farm, Hisar, Asia's largest livestock breeding, research and training institute, is a public funded institute located at Hisar of Haryana state in India.

== History ==
After Hisar was depopulated in Chalisa famine (1783–84 CE), the farm was set up in 1809 by Major James Lumsdaine during British Raj as a private camel stud to supply camels to army, taken over by the British East India Company (EIC) in 1901. Its original name The Camel Stud under Commissariat Department was changed to Ordnance Cattle Farm under Studd Department in 1854, Government Cattle Farm in 1912 and to The Government Livestock Farm in 1945 while other animals were included such as buffaloes, cattle, horses, sheep, goat and swine. Originally farm had 40,000 acre land including "Bir Hisar" area, of which 80% had been transferred to other departments, leaving only 7842 acres with the farm in 2010, of which 5443 acres is in cultivation. Further, more than 3000 acres have been transferred to Hisar Airport, leaving about 4,000 acres with the farm.

In 2015, the Government of Haryana signed an MoU with Israel to set up the Indo-Israeli Centre of Excellence for Animal Husbandry & Dairying, Hisar at Government Livestock Farm, Hisar. Among others, the farm breeds Hariana breed and imported breeds for adoption to the local conditions.

== See also ==
- List of institutions of higher education in Haryana
- List of Universities and Colleges in Hisar
- List of think tanks in India
