= Hisar (city) =

- City
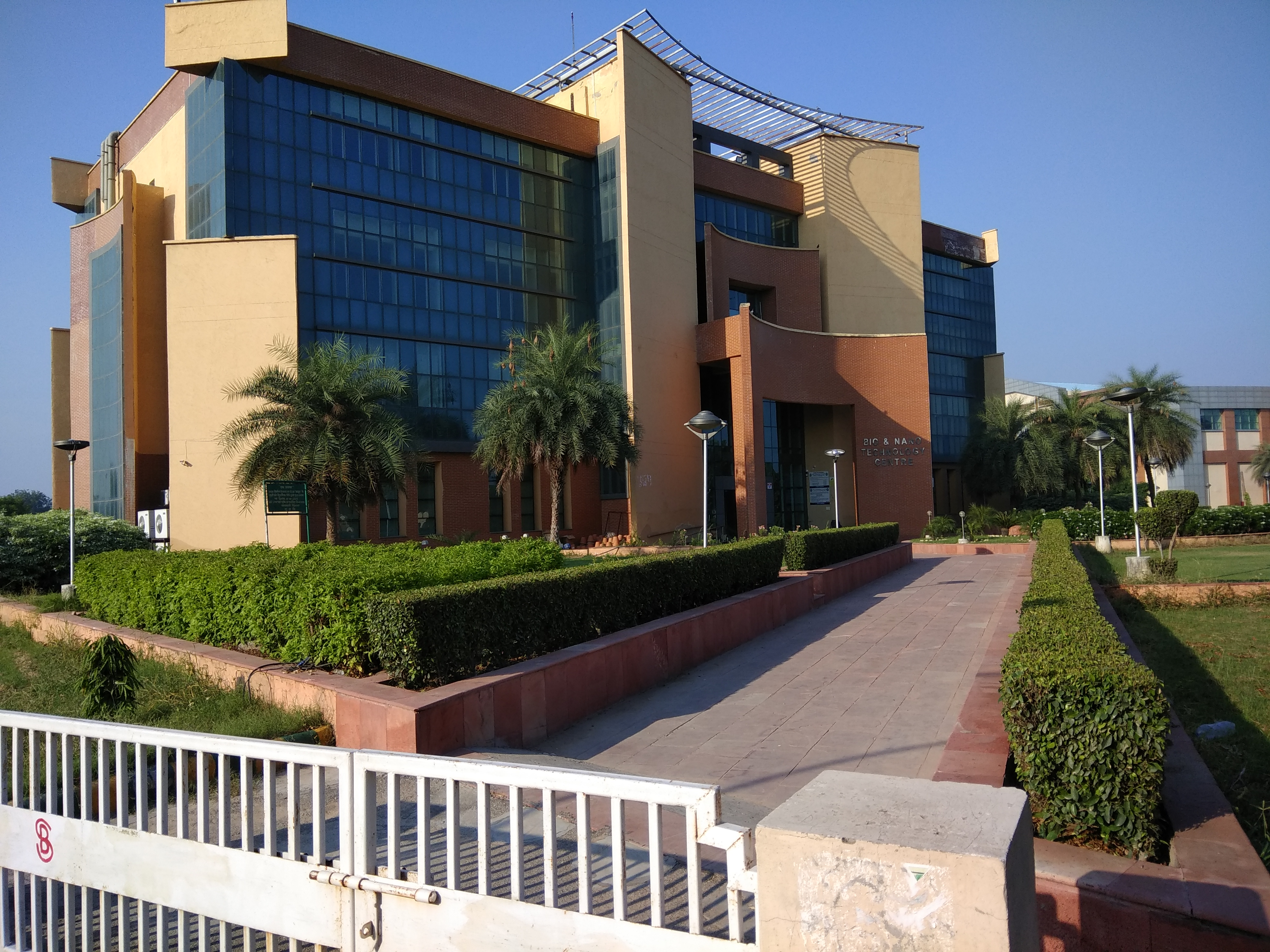
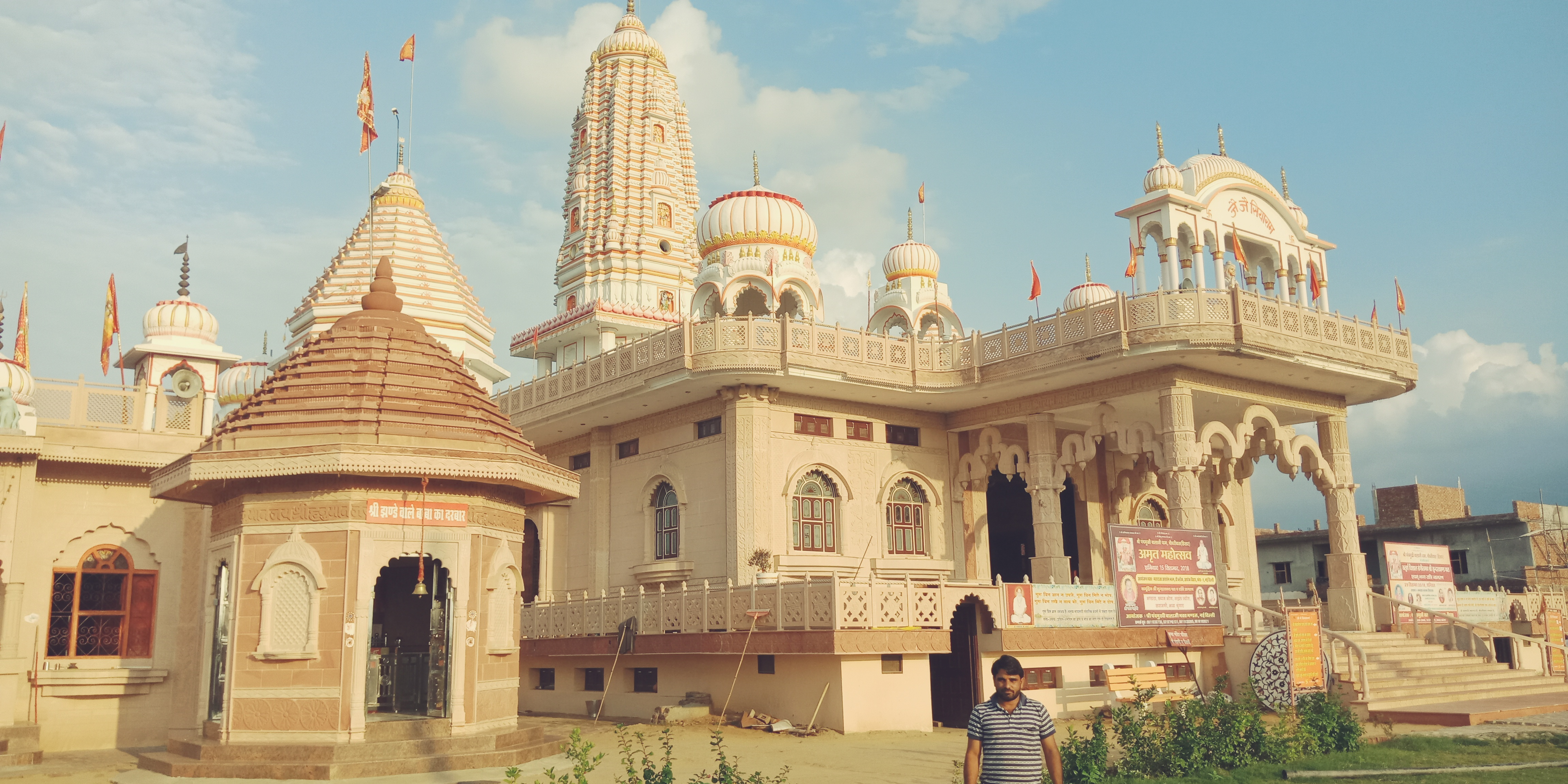
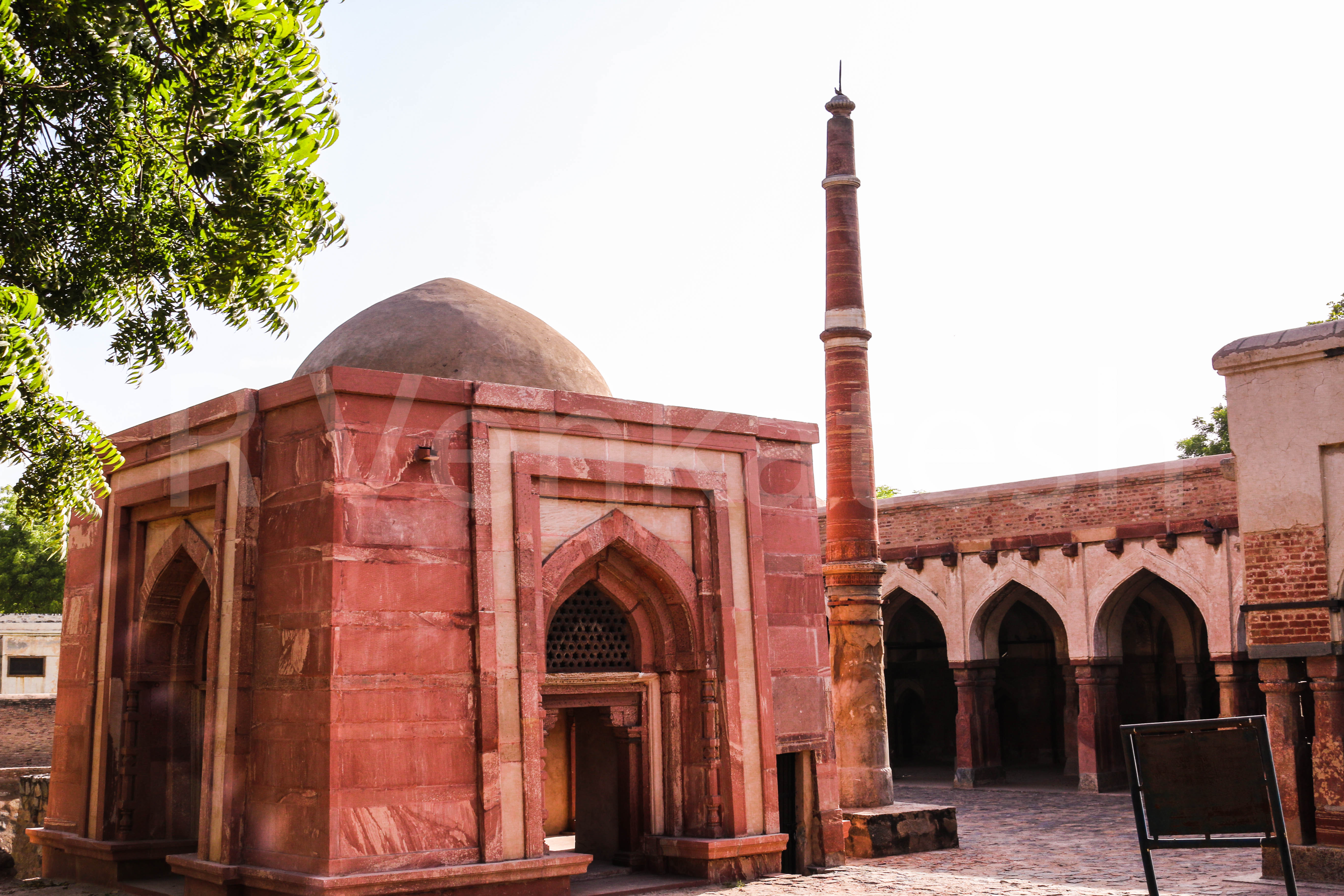
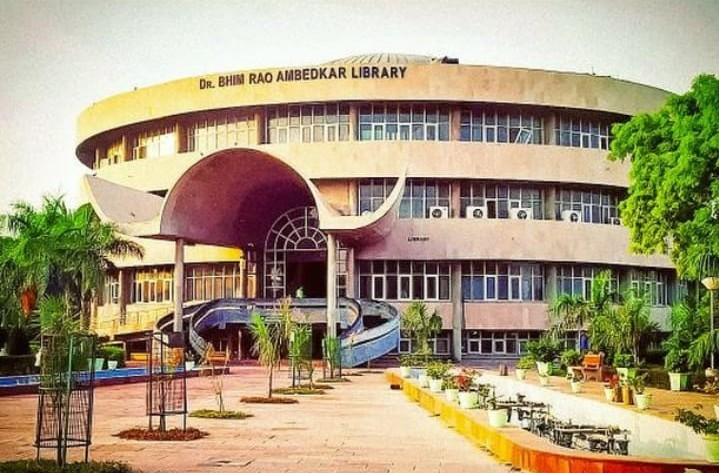
- From top going clockwise: Guru Jumbheshwar University, Balaji Mandir, Lat ki Masjid, GJU Library
- Nicknames: The City of Steel; Education City
- Location within Haryana Location within India
- Coordinates: 29°09′N 75°42′E
- Country: India
- State: Haryana
- District: Hisar
- Division: Hisar
- Incorporated: 1354
- Founder: Firuz Shah Tughlaq

Government
  - Type: Municipal Corporation
  - Body: Hisar Municipal Corporation
  - Mayor: Praveen Popli (BJP)
  - Lok Sabha MP: Jai Parkash (INC)
  - MLA: Savitri Jindal (IND)
  - Municipal Commissioner: Niraj (IAS)
- Elevation: 215 m (705 ft)

Population (2011)
  - Total: 301,249
  - Rank: 141

Languages
  - Official: Hindi
  - Regional: Bagri, Haryanvi
- Time zone: UTC+5:30 (IST)
- PIN: 125001
- UNLOCODE: IN HSS
- Telephone code: 91-1662 xxx xxx
- Vehicle registration: HR-20, HR-39
- Nearest city: New Delhi, Chandigarh
- Sex ratio: 844 ♂/♀
- Literacy: 81.04%
- Lok Sabha constituency: Hisar
- Vidhan Sabha constituency: Hisar
- Planning agency: HUDA
- Climate: Cw (Köppen)
- Precipitation: 490.6 millimetres (19.31 in)
- Avg. summer temperature: 32.5 °C (90.5 °F)
- Avg. winter temperature: 17.6 °C (63.7 °F)
- Website: Hisar Municipal Corporation

Hisar, also known as Hissar, is the administrative headquarters of Hisar district in the state of Haryana in northwestern India. It is located 164 km (102 mi) to the west of the national capital New Delhi, and has been identified as a counter-magnet city for the National Capital Region to develop as an alternative center of growth to Delhi.

The city was ruled by several major powers, including the Mauryans in the third century BC, the Tughlaqs in the 14th century, the Mughals in the 16th century, and the British in the 19th century. After India achieved independence, it was unified with the state of Punjab. When the Punjab was divided in 1966, Hisar became part of Haryana.

The current name was given in 1354 AD, as Hisar-e-Firoza by Firuz Shah Tughlaq, the Sultan of Delhi from 1351 to 1388. The Ghaggar and Drishadvati rivers once flowed through the city, but they have now changed course. Hisar has a continental climate, with very hot summers and relatively cool winters. The most commonly spoken languages are Hindi, Haryanvi, and Bagri.

== History ==
=== Early history ===
Archeological excavations at nearby locations of Rakhigarhi (7000 BCE), Siswal (4000 BCE), and Lohari Ragho suggest the presence of human habitation from pre-Harappan period. Later, Aryan people settled around Drsadvati River. The Jain literature Uttaradhayana Sutra (599/540 - 527/468 BCE) mentions a town Isukara in the Kuru (c. 1200 – c. 900 BCE) country which is believed to be the earlier name of Hisar. The kingdom of Hisar, with its capital at Agroha, possibly assisted Chandragupta Maurya (reign: 321–297 BCE) in his war against the Greeks. The kingdom was then included in the Mauryan Empire, as evidenced by the discovery of Ashokan pillars in the vicinity of the city. The city later came under the Kushan Empire (127 - 375 CE) and the Gupta Empire (250 - 550 CE). The area was sacked by Mahmud of Ghazni during his campaigns. In the 12th century, the Chauhan king Prithviraj Chauhan made Hansi, located in the present day Hisar district, his capital and built a fort. It remained a strategic place for Chauhan Empire until Prithviraj Chauhan was defeated in the Second Battle of Tarain by the invading Ghurid ruler Muhammad Ghori.

=== Tughlaq era ===
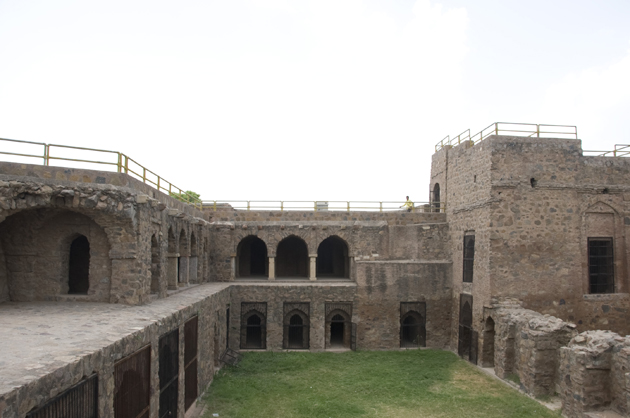
Fort built by Firoz Shah Tughlaq at Hisar in 1354 AD

Hisar was founded in 1354 AD, as 'Hisar-e-Firoza' by Firoz Shah Tughlaq, who reigned over the Sultanate of Delhi from 1351 to 1388. He built a walled fort with four gates, the Delhi Gate and Mori Gate to the east, the Nagori Gate to the south, and the Talaqi Gate to the west. The construction of the fort started in 1354 AD and was completed in 1356 AD. In the middle of the fort stood the Firoz Shah Palace. Apart from its several underground apartments, the complex had different buildings such as Baradari, Lat ki Masjid, Diwan-e-Aam, and Shahi Darwaza. The emperor had the Gujri Mahal built for his wife named Gujri near the palace. The city's name means fort of Firoz in Persian. Timur invaded the city in 1398 AD and his soldiers set fire to the fort.

The city later came under the rule of the Sayyid dynasty and Lodi dynasty before Babur defeated Ibrahim Lodi in the first battle of Panipat.

=== Mughal era ===
When Babur invaded India in 1524–1526, Hisar was part of Ibrahim Lodi's empire. In the battle of Panipat in 1526, Babur sent prince Humayun, who succeeded in defeating the army of Ibrahim Lodi. Babur handed over the city of Hisar to Humayun as a reward for his success on his first military expedition. In 1540, Hisar came under the control of Sher Shah Suri when he defeated Humayun but Humayun took it back in 1555 and assigned it to Akbar. During Akbar's reign (1556–1605), Hisar once again became a place of considerable importance. The city remained under Mughal rule until 1760.

=== British era ===
Hisar was occupied by George Thomas, an Irish adventurer, in 1798. The arrangement continued until 1801 when Thomas was driven out by the Sikh-Maratha-French confederacy. The region came under the rule of British East India Company in 1803 and remained a part until the Indian Rebellion of 1857 when Muhammad Azim and Rao Tula Ram conquered it away for a short period. The company sent forces under General Van Cortlandt, who defeated Azim and Tula Ram on 16 November 1857. Between 1803 and 1879, the British constructed a 4,000-km-long Great Hedge of India, for levying the customs duty on salt and sugar, that ran through Hisar and Hansi. Hisar became a municipality in 1867.

For their participation in First War of Independence, the Chaudharys and Lambardars of villages involved in the rebellion were deprived of their land and property. This included 368 people from Hisar and Gurugram who were either hanged or transported for life. The city remained as a major centre of the Indian independence movement from the rebellion of 1857 until the independence, as many national leaders visited the city during the movement such as Lala Lajpat Rai in 1886, Subhas Chandra Bose in 1938, and Jawaharlal Nehru in 1946.

=== After independence ===
After independence, the city became a part of Punjab and later Haryana in 1966.

== Geography ==
Hisar is located at 29.09°N 75.43°E in western Haryana. It has an average elevation of 215 m (705 ft) above sea level. The region is part of the alluvial Ghaggar-Yamuna plain and its southern and western portions mark a gradual transition to the desert. The Ghaggar and the Drishadvati rivers once flowed through the city. According to tectonic map, the district lies on Delhi-Lahore Ridge which is bounded by thrusts and no earthquake of any significance has originated in the zone in the past. Only one instance has been recorded of a famine occurring in the city in 1837–38.

== Climate ==
Hisar has a semi-arid climate, with very hot summers and mild winters. The main characteristics of climate in Hisar are dryness, extremes of temperature, and scanty rainfall. The maximum daytime temperature during the summer varies between 40 and 46 °C (104 and 115 °F). During winter, its ranges between 1.5 °C and 4 °C. Maximum temperature recorded is 50.3 °C (122.5 °F) in May 2024, whereas the minimum temperature recorded is −3.9 °C (25.0 °F) in January 1929. Annual average maximum and minimum temperature is 32.3 °C (90.1 °F) and 15.4 °C (59.7 °F), respectively. Relative humidity varies from 5 to 100%.

Hisar is located on the outer margins of the south-west monsoon region. The average annual rainfall is around 500 mm (20 in), most of which occurs during July and August. The annual highest rainfall of 793.6 mm (31.24 in) was recorded in 1976 and the lowest of 145.2 mm (5.72 in) in 2000. Dew is observed in December and January. Hot winds, locally known as loo, are strong and frequent from May to July. Occasionally, dust storms are experienced during summer and hail storms during February to April. Fog prevails generally in December and January. Thunderstorms also occur during the post-monsoon season and summer.

Climate data for Hisar (1991–2020 normals, extremes 1914–2020)
Month	Jan	Feb	Mar	Apr	May	Jun	Jul	Aug	Sep	Oct	Nov	Dec	Year
Record high °C (°F)	31.0 (87.8)	35.3 (95.5)	45.6 (114.1)	47.9 (118.2)	48.8 (119.8)	48.4 (119.1)	47.2 (117.0)	44.3 (111.7)	42.2 (108.0)	41.7 (107.1)	36.7 (98.1)	33.6 (92.5)	48.8 (119.8)
Mean daily maximum °C (°F)	19.6 (67.3)	24.2 (75.6)	30.1 (86.2)	37.5 (99.5)	41.4 (106.5)	40.8 (105.4)	37.3 (99.1)	35.9 (96.6)	35.8 (96.4)	34.4 (93.9)	28.9 (84.0)	22.7 (72.9)	32.3 (90.1)
Daily mean °C (°F)	13.3 (55.9)	17.2 (63.0)	22.9 (73.2)	29.2 (84.6)	33.7 (92.7)	34.0 (93.2)	32.3 (90.1)	31.2 (88.2)	30.1 (86.2)	26.6 (79.9)	20.5 (68.9)	15.2 (59.4)	25.5 (77.9)
Mean daily minimum °C (°F)	6.7 (44.1)	9.8 (49.6)	14.8 (58.6)	20.6 (69.1)	25.3 (77.5)	27.6 (81.7)	27.5 (81.5)	26.8 (80.2)	24.6 (76.3)	19.1 (66.4)	12.8 (55.0)	7.7 (45.9)	18.5 (65.3)
Record low °C (°F)	−3.9 (25.0)	−2.2 (28.0)	2.8 (37.0)	6.6 (43.9)	13.5 (56.3)	17.8 (64.0)	20.1 (68.2)	20.0 (68.0)	14.0 (57.2)	8.3 (46.9)	2.5 (36.5)	−1.5 (29.3)	−3.9 (25.0)
Average rainfall mm (inches)	12.7 (0.50)	17.4 (0.69)	18.2 (0.72)	11.4 (0.45)	31.2 (1.23)	70.8 (2.79)	123.1 (4.85)	118.4 (4.66)	76.5 (3.01)	7.2 (0.28)	2.6 (0.10)	4.4 (0.17)	494.0 (19.45)
Average rainy days	1.3	1.5	1.6	1.3	2.3	4.1	6.2	5.9	3.3	0.7	0.3	0.5	28.8
Average relative humidity (%) (at 17:30 IST)	60	51	41	25	25	38	58	62	56	44	49	58	47
Source 1: India Meteorological Department
Source 2: Tokyo Climate Center (mean temperatures 1991–2020)

== Civic administration ==
Hisar City officials
Member of Parliament	Jai Parkash
Member of Legislative Assembly	Savitri Jindal
Commissioner, Hisar Division	Chander Shekhar
Commissioner, Municipal Corporation	Ashok Kumar Garg
Deputy Commissioner	Priyanka Soni
Superintendent of Police	Balwan Singh Rana

Hisar became a municipality in 1867. It was made the headquarters of the Hisar district in 1832. The Municipal Corporation of Hisar, consisting of 20 wards, is headed by a mayor. Law and order in the city are maintained by Haryana Police, which is headed by Superintendent of Police. The city also serves as headquarters of the Hisar Range of Haryana Police which covers Sirsa, Jind, Bhiwani, and Hisar and is headed by Inspector General of Police. District court was set up at Hisar in 1832 and was upgraded as a Sessions Division in 1915. It is headed by Chief Judicial Magistrate. The district court has a bar association which was founded in 1870.

Hisar elects its member to the legislative assembly for Hisar (Vidhan Sabha constituency) and a member to the parliament for Hisar Lok Sabha constituency. It serves as the headquarters of 33rd Battalion of Border Security Force and 3rd Battalion of Haryana Armed Police. The 33rd Armoured Division of Indian Army is stationed at Hisar and is a part of I Corps. In 1996, Brigade of the Guards arrived here for conversion to mechanized profile and the unit is now a fully mechanized battalion.

== Economy ==
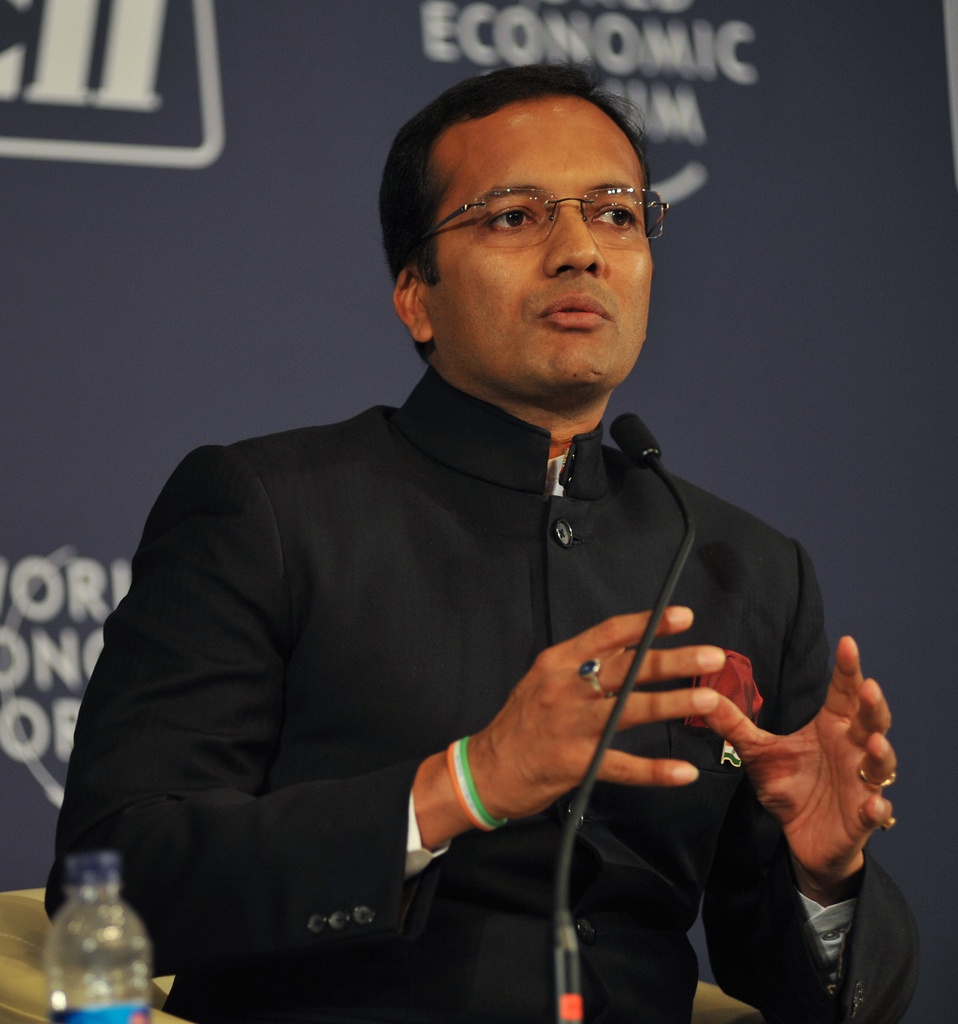
Naveen Jindal, CMD of Jindal Steel and Power, is from Hisar

The city has a large steel industry and is known as the 'City of Steel'. As of June 2012, Hisar is India's largest manufacturer of galvanized iron. Textile and automobile industry is also a major contributor to the economy of the city. It also has a large number of livestock farms with the Central Livestock Farm, established in 1809 being one of the Asia's largest cattle farms. The Jindal Group headed by Savitri Jindal is the world's largest producer of stainless steel strips for razor blades and India's largest producer of coin blanks. The city has been identified as a counter-magnet city for the National Capital Region to attract migrants and develop as an alternative center of growth to Delhi.

== Demographics ==
According to the 2011 census of India, Hisar has a population of 301,249 and is currently the 141st-most populated city in India. Males constitute 54% of the population and females 46%, with 844 females per thousand males. Hisar has an average literacy rate of 81.04%, higher than the national average: male literacy is 86.13% and female literacy is 75.00%. In Hisar, 11% of the population is under 6 years of age and the child sex ratio is 860 girls per thousand boys. Although Hisar city has population of 301,249, its urban population is 306,893, of which 166,623 are males and 140,270 are females. The decadal growth rate was 27.06%. Historically, Hisar had an estimated population of 7,000 people in 1843.

=== Religion ===
Over 97% of the city's population are followers of Hinduism. The remaining 3% are followers of Sikhism, Jainism, Islam, and Christianity. The city had a major Muslim population before Indian Independence in 1947, following which most Muslims migrated to Pakistan during the Partition of India. It was also a major centre of learning for Digambara Jains and was once the seat of Bhattaraka, head of Digambara Jain institutions.

Religion in Hisar City
Religion	Population (1911)	Percentage (1911)	Population (1941)	Percentage (1941)
Hinduism	9,530	55.53%	15,921	55.63%
Islam	7,063	41.15%	11,116	38.84%
Sikhism	97	0.57%	390	1.36%
Christianity	67	0.39%	166	0.58%
Others (Note: Including Jainism, Buddhism, Zoroastrianism, Judaism, Ad-Dharmis, or not stated)	405	2.36%	1,025	3.58%
Total Population	17,162	100%	28,618	100%

== Culture ==
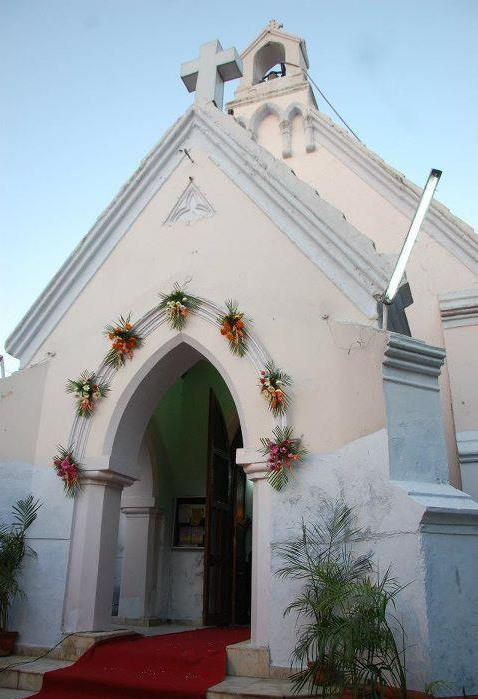
St. Thomas' Church c1860

Most of the popular Indian festivals are celebrated in the city including Diwali, Dussehra, Ram Navami, Janamashtami, Shivratri, Lohri, Gugga Navami, Holi, Basant Panchami, Teej and Makar Sankranti. The festivals of Jains, Christians, Sikhs and Muslims are also celebrated. Sweets are popular, with Hansi ka Peda being the most popular amongst them. Ghoomar is the primary folk dance performed by people during festivals and other occasions and Saang is the folk-theatre of the region. Classical Indian vocalist Jasraj and poet Vishnu Prabhakar belong to Hisar.

=== Architecture ===
Signs of pre-Harappan settlements have been found at Siswal and Lohari Ragho in Hisar district. One of the four pre-Harappan phases has been named Sothi-Siswal period (3200–2600 BC) on this site. Harappa settlements can be found as well in Rakhigarhi. The site covers 2180 hectares, making it the largest Harappan site known in India and the second-biggest overall after Mohenjodaro. All the sites are maintained by Archaeological Survey of India. Agroha is another place of historical importance. It is situated about 24 km from the city and was once the capital of king Agrasena, who is believed to have lived during the last stages of Dvapara Yuga in the Mahabharat era. Remains of his capital have been excavated, known as Agroha Mound or locally as Ther, and belong to around 3000 BC. The city was also a major centre during the Mauryan period as Buddhist and Jain temples have also been revealed in the excavations.

Firoz Shah Palace Complex is another prominent historical site located inside the city. It was built by Firuz Shah Tughlaq in 1354. Asigarh Fort, a centrally protected monument, was built in 1304–1305. Historical places from the British era include St. Thomas Church and Jahaj Kothi Museum, a Jain temple converted to a museum.

== Places of interest ==
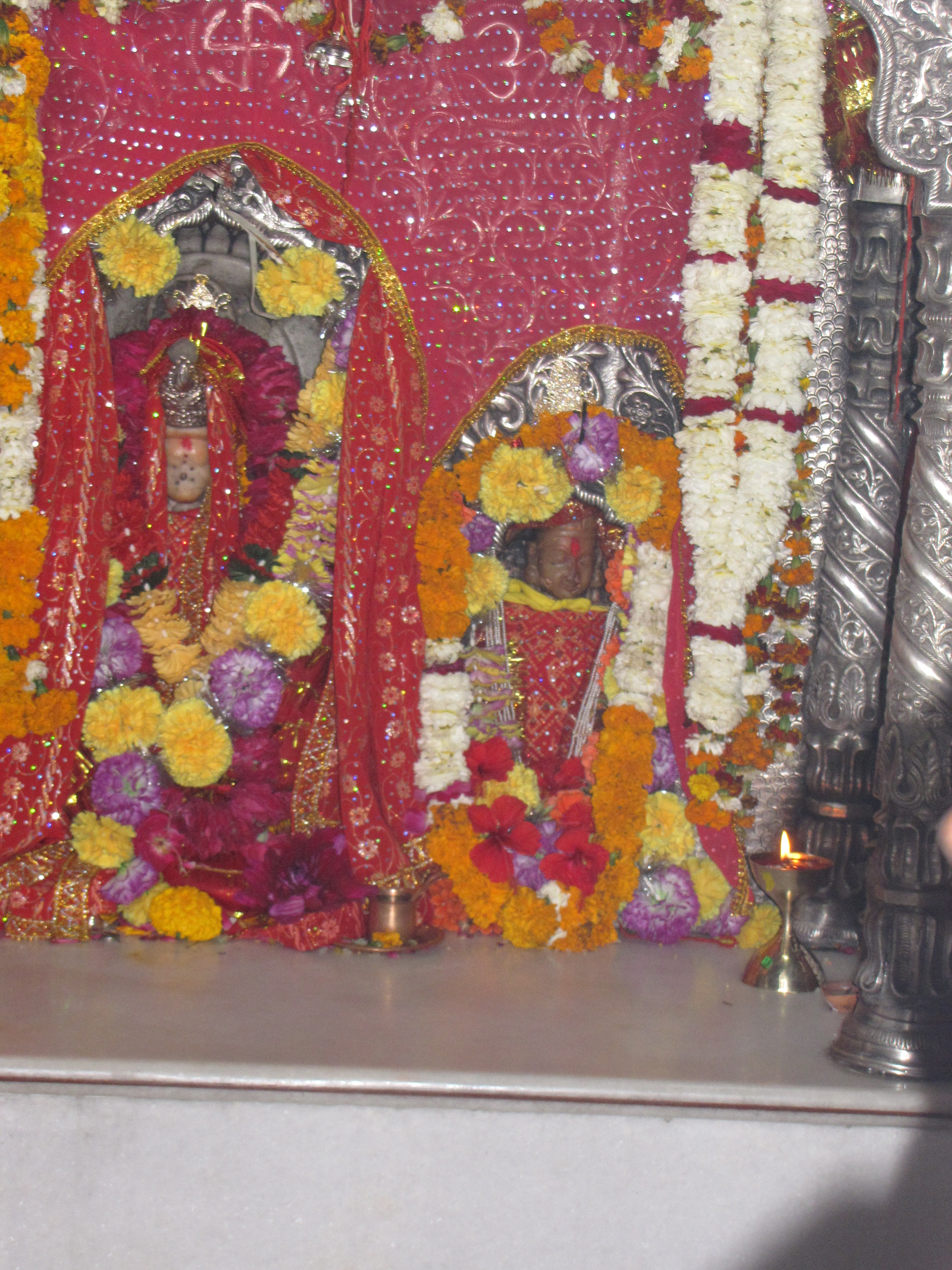
Banbhori Devi is worshipped by local people

Balsamand, Siswal, Banawali, Kanwari, and Rakhigarhi are some of the sites of Indus Valley civilisation of now lost ancient Drishadvati river flowing through Hisar, Drishadvati river was a tributary of ancient Sarasvati River which still flows as remnant Ghaggar-Hakra River. Historic Agroha Mound and Agroha Dham is a prominent religious place located on the outskirts of the city about 22 km away on Fatehabad-Sirsa-Bhatinda road. A local deity Banbhori is worshipped by local people. Delhi Sultanate era Firoz Shah Palace Complex and Pranpir Badshah tomb are located in the city.

The oldest park located in the city is the Krantiman Park, located across the historic St. Thomas Church. The park was built in the 19th century and was then known as Company Bagh. Other parks include Madhuban Park, Town Park, and O. P. Jindal Knowledge Center. The O. P. Jindal Knowledge Centre, inaugurated in 2009 a museum, library, park and houses a 25-storied, 282-ft- high steel tower modeled on the Space Needle in Seattle. Haryana Rural Antique Museum, which is maintained by CCS HAU in its Gandhi Bhawan, exhibits evolution of agriculture and vanishing antiques. Jahaj Kothi Museum, named after George Thomas, is located inside Firoz Shah Palace Complex and maintained by the Archaeological Survey of India. Rakhigarhi Indus Valley Civilisation Museum is located at Rakhigarhi, which is an Indus Valley Civilisation site 60 km away.

Blue Bird Lake, an artificial lake and tourist complex maintained by the Haryana Tourism, offers boating and watersports, birding, picnicking, and recreation. The deer park and Shatavar Vatika Herbal Park are located at the outskirts of the city and maintained by the Haryana State Forest Department. It was established in 1971 and endangered species such as blackbuck, chital, sambar, and nilgai can be found here. Hisar Police Lines Golf Course is located near the Hisar Airport.

== Media ==
Doordarshan Kendra was set up in 2002. Besides Doordarshan, local cable operators broadcast channels in the city. An All India Radio station is located at Hisar. Private FM stations operating in Hisar are BIG FM, My FM, Radio Mantra, Radio Dhamaal and Radio Tarang. CCS HAU community radio station was started in 2011.

== Facilities ==
=== Utility services ===
Before independence of India, monsoon or groundwater were the main sources of irrigation. The main source of water now is Balsamand branch of Western Yamuna Canal. Municipal Corporation of Hisar supplies potable water to the city. The city first got electricity in 1936. Power is distributed by Dakshin Haryana Bijli Vitran Nigam Limited. Bharat Sanchar Nigam Limited (BSNL) provides landline and broadband services. Cell phone coverage is extensive, and the main service providers are Vodafone Essar, Airtel, BSNL, Reliance Communications, Idea Cellular and Tata Indicom. The planning of the city is done by Haryana Urban Development Authority.

=== Healthcare ===
People from Punjab and Rajasthan come to Hisar for medical treatment. The district Red Cross Society caters to specially abled people.

== Transport ==
=== Road ===
The city lies on National Highway 9 and National Highway 52. National Highway 9 from Pithoragarh to Malout connects it to Rohtak and Sirsa and National Highway 52 from Sangrur to Ankola connects it to Narwana and Jaipur and connected to Kaithal . The state highways of Haryana that pass through Hisar are State Highways 10, 13, and 20. Besides, there are district roads, village link roads and canal inspection roads. In 1947, the total metalled road length in the city was 137 km (85 mi) which increased to 1,188 km (738 mi) in 1978.

Bus service is the major means of transport in the town. Bus services are provided by Haryana Roadways and other private operators. Hisar bus depot was established on 11 August 1969 and has a sub depot at Hansi. As of 2012, the depot has a total of 198 buses with daily ridership of 73,500. All the 290 villages of Hisar district are connected to the city through either public transport provided by Haryana Roadways or through private buses. Auto rickshaws are a major means of transport for travelling within the city. In August 2012, city bus service was started in the city. The city is a part of Delhi Mumbai Industrial Corridor Project which aims at developing strong road and rail connections between the cities lying on it and develop them as an industrial area.

=== Rail ===
Hisar is a railway junction station, and it falls under Bikaner division of North Western Railway Zone. The first railway line to the city was laid down in 1883 when Delhi Rewari Railway was extended to Bhatinda. Currently, four broad gauge railway lines are at the station. The railway station is a part of Western Dedicated Rail Freight Corridor according to which the city is to be developed as an export-oriented industrial unit. The city is well connected to the neighboring states through rail links.

=== Air ===
Hisar Airport is located on the outskirts of the city and is currently under re-development. In August 2012, the DGCA approved the Haryana state government's plan to develop the airport to operate domestic passenger services. Its 4,000-foot (1,200 m) runway will be extended to 6,000 ft (1,800 m) to accommodate air service.

== Education ==
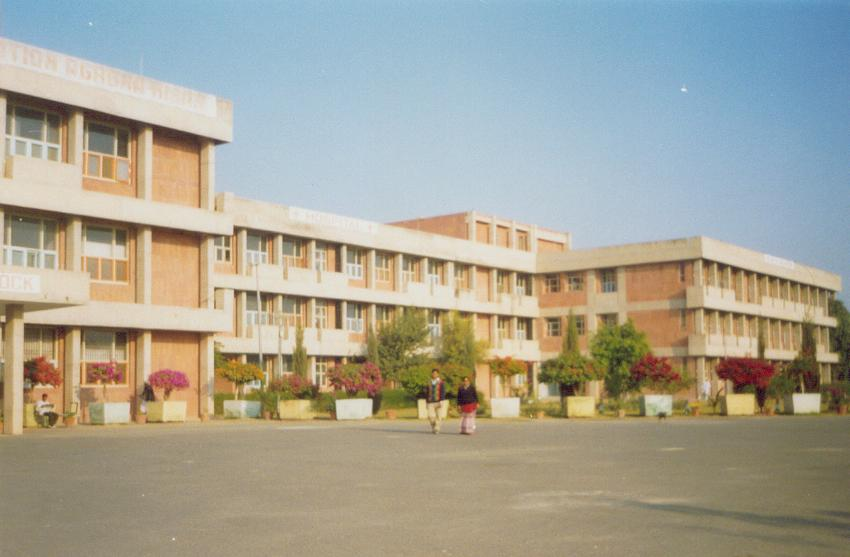
Maharaja Agrasen Medical College at Agroha.

Before the British Raj, indigenous schools provided elementary education. Till 1892, the city had only one middle school. The first private school, CAV High School, was set up by Arya Samaj in 1918. Chaudhary Charan Singh Haryana Agricultural University, one of Asia's biggest agricultural universities was the first university established in Hisar, in 1971. Other universities located in the city are Guru Jambheshwar University of Science and Technology, Lala Lajpat Rai University of Veterinary and Animal Sciences and Shanti Niketan Vidyapeeth, Hisar. Commercial and private pilot license training is provided by the Haryana Institute of Civil Aviation (HICA) from Hisar Airport built in 1965.

A few agricultural and veterinary research centers are also situated in the city such as National Research Centre on Equines, Central Sheep Breeding Farm, Government Livestock Farm, Hisar Northern Region Farm Machinery Training and Testing Institute, Regional Fodder Station, Hisar and Central Institute for Research on Buffaloes. In 1988, the city hosted the 2nd World Buffalo Congress. The major library in the city is Nehru Library. It also has a Government Polytechnic with courses in Textiles, Fashion, Mechanical Engineering, Electronics & Communication Engineering, Electrical Engineering and computer science.

== Sports ==
Mahabir Stadium, Haryana Agricultural University Stadium and HAU Giri Centre host state sponsored sports academies. Hisar hosted the 51st National Boxing Championship in 2004, 22nd Haryana State Women Sports Festival in 2008, and the 9th Hockey India Senior Women National Championship in 2019. It has a sports center run by Sports Authority of India at Chaudhary Charan Singh Haryana Agricultural University which has a synthetic track of international standard apart from other facilities. Other major sporting venue in Hisar is Mahabir Stadium for multiple sports which was completed in the year 1972, run by District Olympic Association.

Sports persons from Hisar include Manvinder Bisla in cricket, Saina Nehwal in badminton, Pinki Jangra in boxing and Manandeep Singh in football. In April 2012, Ajay Kumar from Hisar qualified for 2012 Summer Olympics.

== Notable people ==
- Israr Ahmed, Pakistani religious scholar
- Dushyant Chautala, Indian politician
- Kamal Gupta, Indian politician
- Jasraj, Hindustani classical vocalist
- Om Prakash Jindal, Indian businessman
- Surya Kant, 53rd Chief Justice of India
- Saina Nehwal, Indian badminton player
- Shivangi Pathak, Indian mountaineer
- Ankur Rathee, Indian-American actor in Bollywood and Hollywood
- Yashpal Sharma, actor
- Mallika Sherawat, Indian Actress
