= Guru Jambheshwar University of Science and Technology =

University in Hisar, Haryana, India

- Type: State Govt. University
- Established: 1995
- Affiliations: UGC
- Chancellor: Governor of Haryana
- Vice-Chancellor: Narsi Ram Bishnoi
- Location: Hisar, Haryana, India; 29.10°N 75.45°E
- Campus: Urban
- Website: www.gjust.ac.in

Guru Jambheshwar University of Science and Technology, Hisar, was founded in 1995. The jurisdiction of the university extends to the courses being run in the areas of science, technology, engineering, pharmacy and management.

Guru Jambheshwar University of Science and Technology, Hisar, was established on 20 October 1995 by an Act of the Legislature of the State of Haryana. It was formally inaugurated on 1 November 1995. It is named after Guru Jambheshwar Ji Maharaj, a saint environmentalist of the 15th century.

== Academic ==
=== Academic programmes ===
The university offers a range of academic programmes and courses at post-graduate and undergraduate level. A Medical College, on 30 acres at GJU campus at Hisar, under centrally-sponsored scheme was announced in June 2023.

=== Credit-based systems of examinations ===
The university switched to a credit-based system for all courses in 2006–07. The prominent features of the credit-based system are the process of continuous evaluation of a student's performance and flexibility to allow the students to progress at an optimum pace suited to individual ability and convenience, subject to fulfilling minimum requirement for continuation.

=== Rankings ===
University and college rankings

General – India
- NIRF (Overall) (2021): 101-150
- NIRF (Universities) (2021): 88

Pharmacy – India
- NIRF (2021): 27

GJUS&T was ranked in the 101-150 band overall in India by National Institutional Ranking Framework (NIRF) in 2021, 88th among universities and 27 in the pharmacy ranking.

=== Recognition and accreditation ===
The university is recognised by the University Grants Commission.

== Affiliated colleges ==
Its jurisdiction extends over Hisar.

== Campus ==
The GJU is located about 1 km from the Hisar Airport; 2 km from the Blue Bird Lake; 3 km from the bus station along the National Highway 9 (old NH10), 4 km from the town center & main market area; 6 km from the Hisar Junction railway station; 6 km from Mahabir Stadium; 167 km from the Indira Gandhi International Airport, Delhi; 180 km from the New Delhi railway station; and 235 km from the Chandigarh International Airport.

The university is situated over about 372 acres.

The university has 8 teaching blocks. There are 149 residential houses for employees.The university has the branch of Punjab National Bank with ATM, a post office and a police station. The university is running its own cafeteria.

== MMTTC ==
MMTTC is among top ranking among 116 MMTTC exist among all India training centre.

== Notable alumni ==
- Dushyant Chautala, Deputy Chief Minister of Haryana
- Rohit Sardana, Indian journalist

== See also ==
- State University of Performing And Visual Arts
- State Institute of Film and Television
