= B. K. Goenka =

Indian billionaire

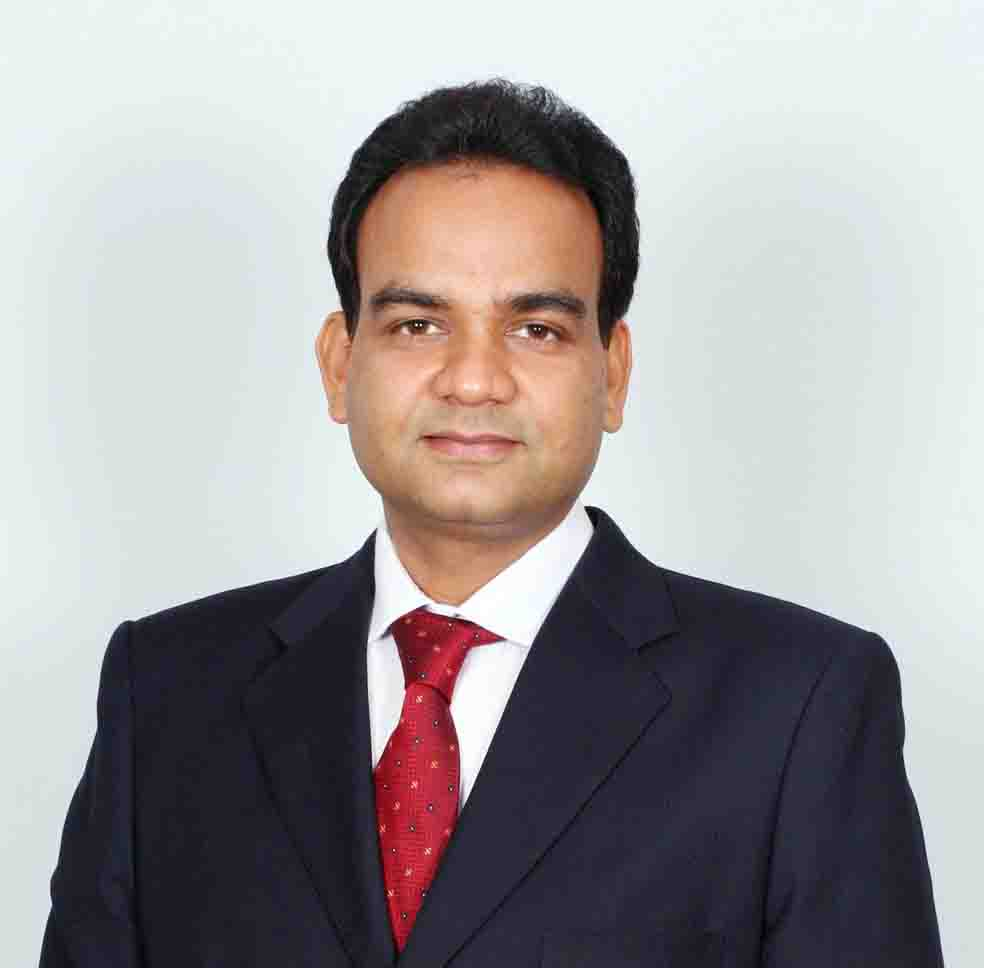
- Born: Balkrishan Gopiram Goenka; 1966 (age 59–60); Hisar, Haryana, India
- Occupations: Entrepreneur; industrialist
- Years active: 1985–present
- Title: Chairman of Welspun World
- Spouse: Dipali Goenka
- Children: 2

Balkrishan Gopiram Goenka (born 1966) is an Indian billionaire businessman and the founder and chairman of Welspun World, a multinational conglomerate with operations in home textiles, steel, and infrastructure. He has been president of the Associated Chambers of Commerce and Industry of India (ASSOCHAM).

== Early life and education ==
Balkrishan Goenka was born in 1966 into a Marwari family involved in the food grain trade.

He grew up in Hisar, Haryana, and later moved to Delhi.

After completing his schooling, Goenka joined his father's dal mill business at the age of 16 and later traveled to London to gain insights into trading.

== Career ==
In 1985, Goenka relocated to Mumbai, where he co-established a textile plant alongside his maternal uncle. That same year, he founded Welspun, which initially focused on manufacturing polyester yarn. The company's first unit, Welspun Winilon Silk Mills, was set up in Palghar, Maharashtra, followed by a second facility in Vapi, Gujarat.

During the early 1990s, Welspun expanded into home textiles, with a focus on exports. It became a publicly listed company in 1991 and was later renamed Welspun India Limited (now Welspun Living Limited). Under Goenka’s leadership, the company began supplying to major global retailers, including Walmart and Macy's. Welspun also diversified into the production of steel pipes for the oil and gas industry, establishing a large-scale manufacturing plant in Gujarat. The business gained traction after securing an order from Enron's Dabhol Power Company.

Between 2006 and 2008, under his leadership, Welspun pursued a phase of international expansion, acquiring textile manufacturing units in the UK, Mexico, Portugal, and Argentina. However, high production costs and operational challenges led to the eventual closure of its facilities in Mexico and Argentina, and the sale of its Portugal business. In the following years, the group underwent restructuring to exit non-core businesses and focus on its primary operations. As part of this restructuring, Welspun sold two power plants for approximately ₹400 crore and divested Welspun Maxsteel to JSW Steel for ₹1,000 crore.

Goenka acquired Christy, a UK-based towel manufacturer known for supplying products to sporting events such as Wimbledon, and Sorema, a bath-rug manufacturer based in Portugal. He also oversaw the launch of a greenfield project in Mexico and initiated a joint venture with Italy's Zucchi to manufacture bathrobes.

In 2018, Goenka was elected president of The Associated Chambers of Commerce & Industry of India (ASSOCHAM), succeeding Sandeep Jajodia.

== Personal life ==
Goenka married Dipali Goenka in 1987, who is the CEO and managing director of Welspun Living.

The couple has two daughters, Radhika and Vanshika.

== Wealth ==
In 2015, Goenka was ranked 83rd on Forbes India's Rich List.

== Media presence ==
Goenka appeared in a documentary film about Indian Prime Minister Narendra Modi.
