= Jindal =

Jindal is often used as a family name.

- O. P. Jindal (1930–2005), Indian industrialist and parliamentarian
- Savitri Jindal (born 1950), chairperson emeritus of Jindal Steel and Power
- Bobby Jindal (born 1971), American politician and former Governor of Louisiana, United States
- Pragun Akhil Jindal (born 1996), Indian author and speaker
- Gaurang Jindal (born 2005), Indian Cricket Player (Under arm bowler) from Agar Nagar
- Suyash Jindal (born 2004), IITK alum

== See also ==
- Jindal family, one of India's wealthiest families
- Jindal Steel and Power Limited, led by Naveen Jindal
- Jindal Stainless Limited, led by Ratan Jindal
- JSW Group, led by Sajjan Jindal
