= Jindal family =

Indian industrial dynasty

The Jindal family
- Family
- Country: India
- Current region: Haryana
- Origin: India
- Founded: Late 18th to early 19th century
- Founder: Devi Sahai Jindal
- Members: List of members

The Jindal family is one of India's wealthiest industrial dynasties who are known in steel, power, and infrastructure business.

== Notable members ==
- Netramji Jindal (husband) & Chandrawali Devi (wife)
  - Devi Sahai Jindal (Padma Shri, and founder of DS Jindal Group) (Son of Netramji Jindal)
    - Kailash Jindal
    - Anil Jindal
      - Pratik Jindal
    - Arvind Jindal (Founder of Jindal Tubes)
      - Sahil Jindal
      - Shreevatsa Jindal
    - Dinesh Jindal
  - Om Prakash Jindal (Founder of OP Jindal Group (Jindal Steel, Jindal Stainless etc.) (Son of Netramji Jindal), Savitri Jindal (wife)
    - Prithvi Raj Jindal
    - Sajjan Jindal (Founder of JSW Group), Sangita Jindal (wife)
      - Parth Jindal
    - Ratan Jindal
      - Abhyuday Jindal
    - Naveen Jindal
      - Venkatesh Jindal
  - Bhavi Chand Jindal (Founder of BC Jindal Group) (Son of Netramji Jindal)
    - D.P. Jindal
      - Saket Jindal
      - Raghav Jindal
    - Shyam Jindal
      - Bhavesh Jindal
  - Madan Lal Jindal (Founder of ML Jindal Group) (Son of Netramji Jindal)
    - Janak Jindal
      - Abhishek Jindal
    - Yogesh Jindal
      - Ayush Jindal
    - Pradeep Jindal
      - Sanchit Jindal
  - Sitaram Jindal (Founder of SR Jindal Group) (Son of Netramji Jindal)

== Photographs of the notable members of the family ==
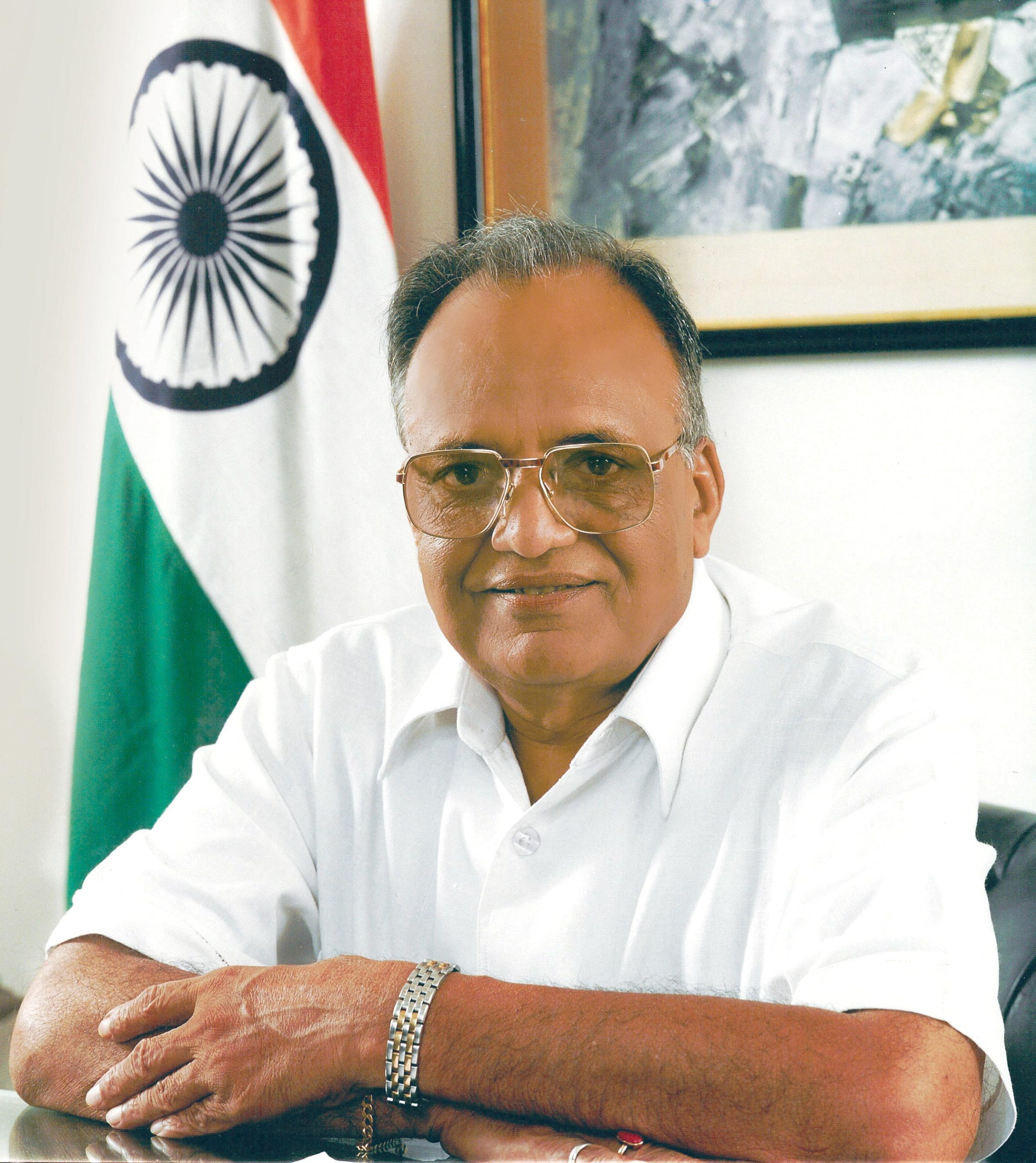
Om Prakash Jindal

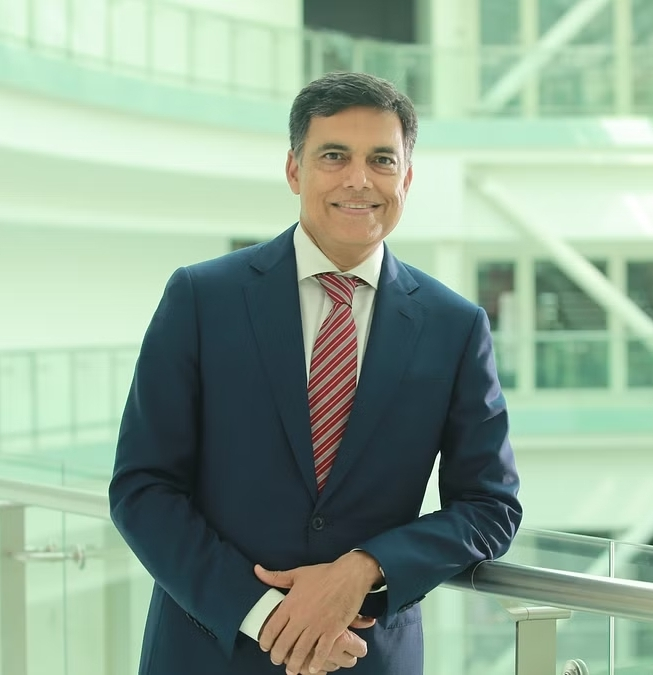
Sajjan Jindal

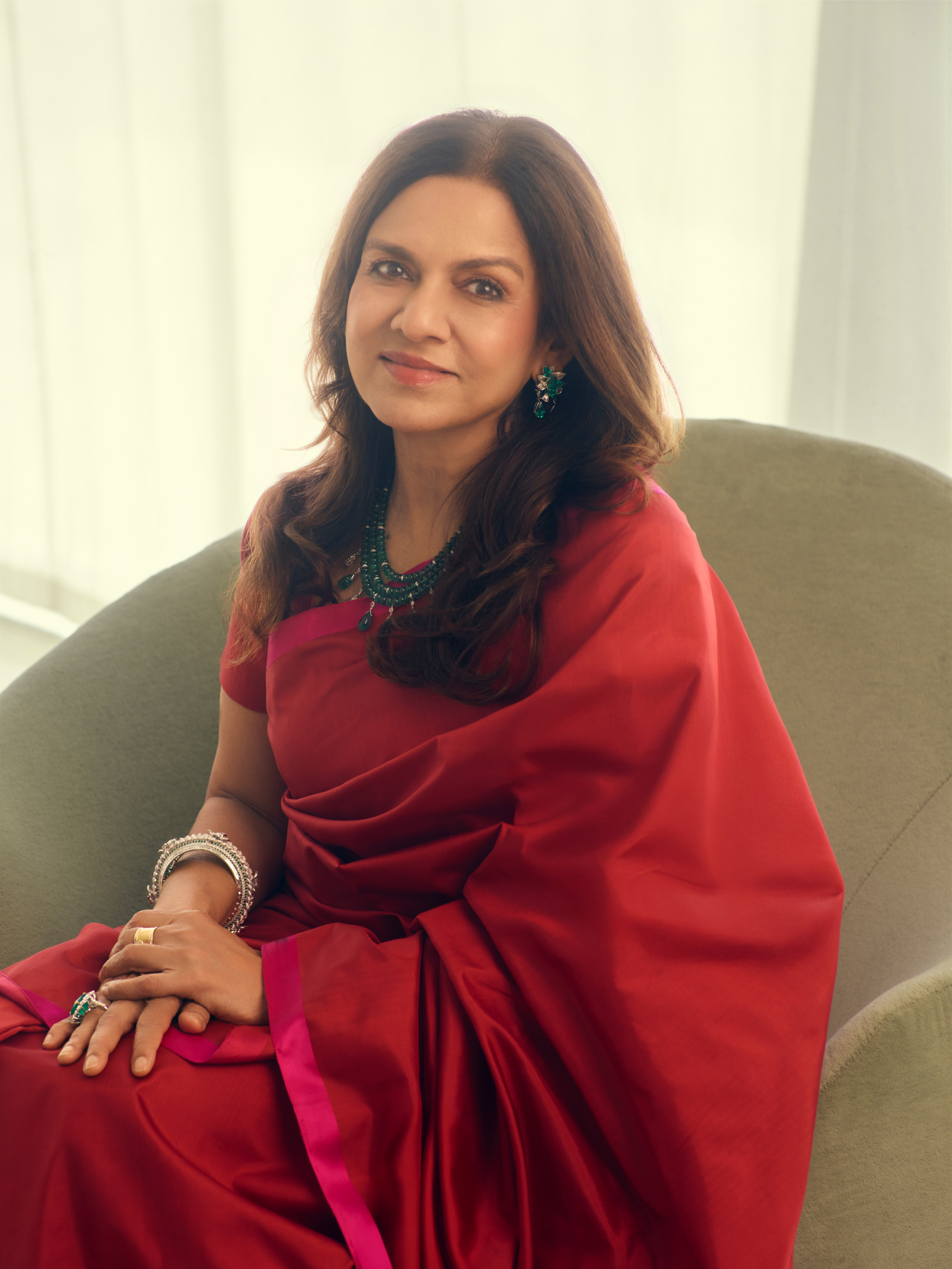
Sangita Jindal

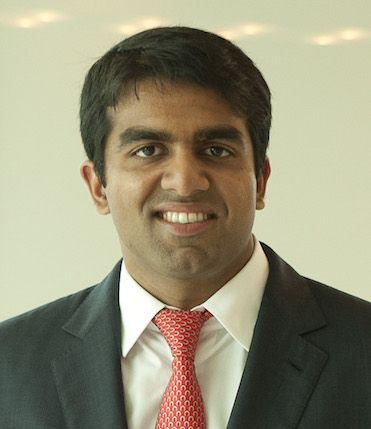
Parth Jindal

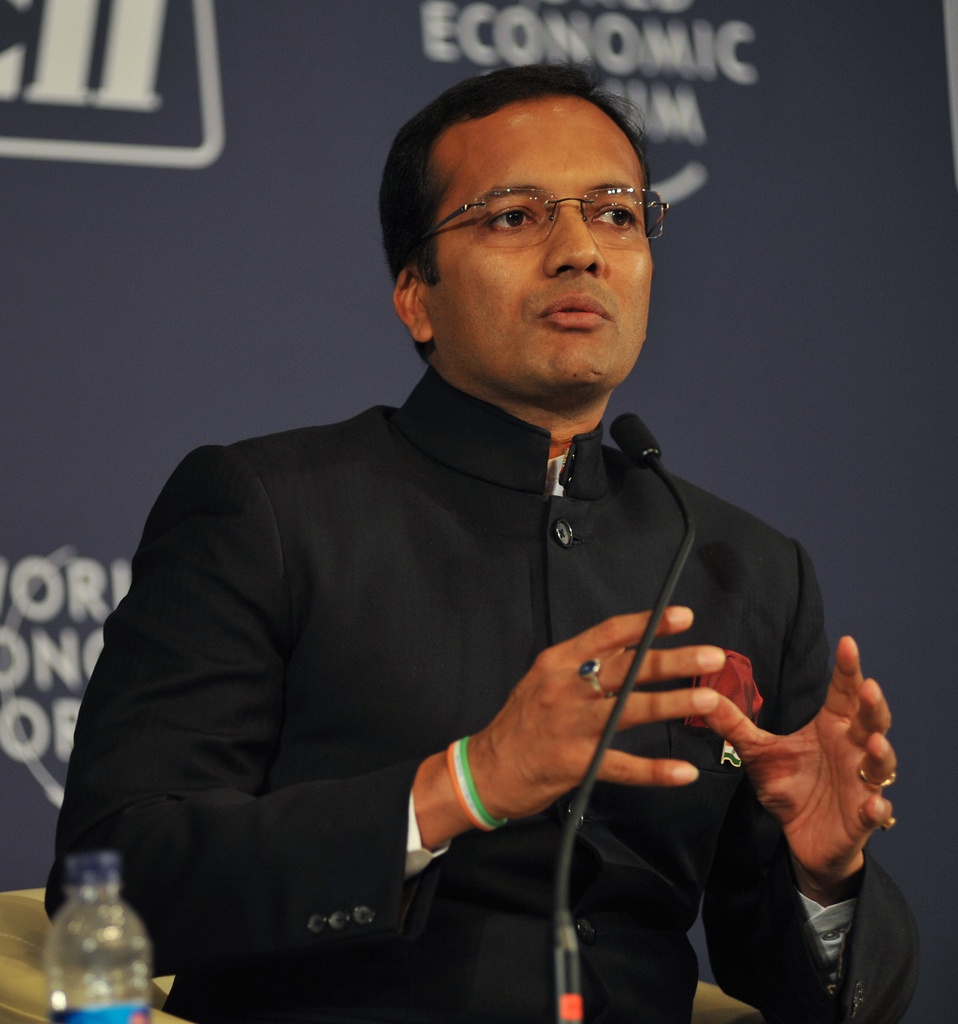
Naveen Jindal

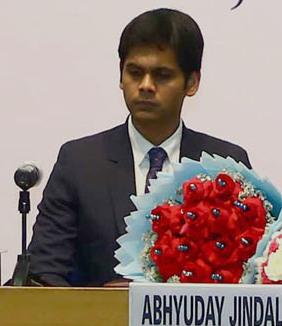
Abhyuday Jindal

== See also ==
- Tata family
