= JSW Steel =

Indian multinational steel company

JSW Steel Limited

- JSW Vijaynagar Works, Karnataka, India
- Type: Public
- Traded as: BSE: 500228; NSE: JSWSTEEL; NSE NIFTY 50 constituent
- ISIN: INE019A01038
- Industry: Steel
- Founded: 1982; 44 years ago
- Founder: Sajjan Jindal (chairman)
- Headquarters: Mumbai, Maharashtra, India
- Area served: Worldwide
- Key people: Sheshagiri Rao MVS, Jayant Acharya
- Products: Steel, flat steel products, long steel products, wire products, plates
- Revenue: ▲₹204,077 crore (US$22 billion) (2026)
- Operating income: ▲₹29,346 crore (US$3.1 billion) (2026)
- Net income: ▲₹25,508 crore (US$2.7 billion) (2026)
- Total assets: ▲₹269,676 crore (US$29 billion) (2026)
- Total equity: ▲₹100,053 crore (US$11 billion) (2026)
- Number of employees: 28,166 (2026)
- Parent: JSW Group
- Subsidiaries: Amba River Coke; Asian Colour Coated Ispat Limited; JSW Bhushan Power and Steel Ltd. Neotrex Steel Private Limited; Hasuad Steel; JSW Bengal Steel; JSW Energy (Bengal); JSW Industrial Gases; JSW Jharkhand Steel; JSW Natural Resources Bengal; JSW Utkal Steel; Welspun Maxsteel Ltd; JSW MI
- Rating: Carbon Disclosure Project A/Stable; Fitch Ratings BB/Long Term Issuer Default Rating
- Website: www.jswsteel.in

JSW Steel Limited is an Indian multinational steel company based in Mumbai and is a flagship company of the JSW Group.

== History ==
JSW Steel's history can be traced back to 1982, when the Jindal Group acquired Piramal Steel Limited, which operated a mini steel mill at Tarapur in Maharashtra and renamed it as Jindal Iron and Steel Company (JISCO). Soon after the acquisition the group set up its first steel plant in 1982 at Vasind, near Mumbai.

Later, in 1994, Jindal Vijayanagar Steel Limited (JVSL) was set up with its plant located at Toranagallu in the Bellary-Hospet area in the State of Karnataka, the heart of the iron ore belt and spread over 10,000 acres (40 km^{2}) of land. It is well connected to both the New Mangalore Port and Jaigad Port and is 340 kilometres from Bangalore. It is said to be the sixth largest steel plant in the world.

In the year 2005, JISCO and JVSL merged to form JSW Steel Limited. It also set up a plant at Salem with an annual capacity of 1 million tonnes.

== Operations ==
As of July 2023, the installed with a production capacity of 29.7 MTPA in India and the United States. The company is aiming to boost the total steel production capacity to 38.5 MTPA by the financial year 2025.

As of April 2023, nearly 98% of JSW Steel's revenue comes from steel and related products — long rolled products (18%), galvanised coils/sheets (15%), CR coils/sheets (9%), plates/pipes (5%), other miscellaneous steel products (5%), and iron ore (2%), in that order. Overall, 70% of revenue is derived from India, and 30% is from overseas. The company historical emphasis has primarily been on flat products, stemming from its origins in a cold rolling mill. As part of its corporate strategy, the company typically directs half of its flat products to downstream facilities for additional value-enhancing processes like galvanizing, coating, or tinning.

JSW Steel plans to utilize energy from a forthcoming 3,800-tonne hydrogen plant at its Vijayanagar facility, aiming to provide green steel at a premium price. The company has established an agreement with its affiliate, JSW Energy, to procure green hydrogen and green oxygen for the production of sustainable steel. Additionally, the company will earn carbon credits based on the amount of conventional thermal power that is substituted with green energy. By 2030, the company plans to set up a green steel plant to comply with the European Union’s Carbon Border Adjustment Mechanism and gradually reduce it use of blast furnaces throughout its value chain.

=== Plants ===
- JSW Vijaynagar Works (also known as Integrated Steel Plant, Vijaynagar): It is a flagship plant of the company, which also stands as the largest single-location steel manufacturing unit across India. At present, the plant is in the midst of a brownfield expansion aimed at increasing its current capacity from 13 MTPA to 18 MTPA by FY24. This expansion will cover 600 acres and involve the addition of a 4.5 MTPA blast furnace, two steel melt shops of 350 tonnes each, a 5 MTPA hot strip mill, alongside various other related facilities. In 2017-2018, a new ladle furnace slag recycling process was adopted at Vijayanagar Works as part of a new environmental and waste disposal strategy. The slag was stabilized using an alumina-based ladle-covering compound. The trials were conducted in two phases. Firstly, to prevent the dusting phenomenon in Al-killed steel ladle slag and generate lump slag, a suitable ladle covering compound was selected, and the slag was chemically modified. Secondly, the lump slag was utilized as a 100% replacement for synthetic slag in Si-killed steel ladles, reducing specific consumption from 1.2 kg per ton of liquid steel to zero. The report highlighted eliminating specific synthetic slag consumption at 1.2 kg per ton of liquid steel.
- JSW Dolvi Works (also known as Integrated Steel Plant, Dolvi): This plant was acquired by the company in 2010 from Ispat Steel for $3 billion. It was first Indian steel plant to adopt a combination of ConArc technology for both steel-making and compact strip production. Whereas a blast furnace transforms iron ore into steel, ConArc utilizes iron pellets, which are essentially one step processed iron ore. In 2022, Dolvi Works obtained security protection from the Central Industrial Security Force. At that time, it was the 13th industrial facility in the private sector in India to be placed under CISF security apparatus.
- JSW Sambalpur Works (also known as Integrated Steel Plant, Rengali): This plant was acquired by the company in 2019 after the liquidation of Bhushan Power & Steel by National Company Law Tribunal. It added 3.5 MTPA to overall steel production capacity of the company.
- JSW Salav Works: This plant was previously was owned by Welspun Group and it was purchased by the JSW Steel in 2014 for ₹1,000 crore (US$110 million). It is located in near vicinity (within 40 km) of the JSW Dolvi Works.
- JSW Kalmeshwar Works: It is India's first coated steel manufacturing facility, producing galvanized, Galvalume, and pre-painted galvanized/galvalume steel. The plant was acquired by the company from Ispat Steel, is situated 30 kilometers from Nagpur in Central India.
- JSW Tarapur Works: It is country's largest single location coated steel plant which manufactures of ultra thin coated products such as pre-painted galvanised/galvalume, galvanised and bare galvalume steel. It is located about 100 kilometers from Mumbai.
- JSW Vasind Works: The facility, situated 70 kilometers from Mumbai, is a complex equipped with cold rolling, galvanizing, and color coating capabilities.
- JSW Salem Works: The plant is located 350 kilometers from Chennai, is known for producing special alloy steel.

== Merger and acquisitions ==
In 2007, JSW Steel formed a joint venture for a steel plant in Georgia. Any by 2020, it sold of 39 percent stake which it held in JV to Georgian Steel Group Holdings Limited.

In 2009, Japan's JFE Steel, entered into a strategic partnership with JSW Steel to produce automotive steel products.

In 2014, it acquired Welspun Maxsteel Limited in a deal valued at around INR 1,000 Crores.

In 2018, JSW Steel Italy acquired 100% shares of Aferpi S.p.A, Piombino Logistics, and 69.27% of GSI Lucchini S.p.A's share capital from Cevitaly S.r.l for €55 million.

In 2019, JSW Steel acquired Bhushan Power & Steel. This resulted in the absorption of an integrated steel plant in Rengali, Sambalpur, with a capacity of 2.5 million tonnes annually.

in 2020, JSW Ispat Steel was acquired by JSW Steel, 20 months after the latter acquired a controlling stake in Monnet Ispat Industries.

In April 2021, the company acquired Plate and Coil Mill Division (PCMD) of Welspun Corp for a sum of ₹848.5 cr.

In October 2021, JSW Steel acquired 51% stake in Neotrex Steel from JSW Group promoters and entered into an under-construction project to manufacture Low Relaxation Prestressed Concrete (LRPC).

In October 2022, JSW Steel initiated a process to acquire Central-India based National Steel & Agro (NSAIL) through resolution plan submitted under the corporate insolvency resolution process. The company makes flat steel products such as cold-rolled coil, galvanised corrugated sheets, colour coil and pre-painted profile sheets and owes lenders over Rs 1,600 crore. In May 2023, the company got the final nod from National Company Law Tribunal for the acquisition.

In January 2023, JSW Steel entered into an agreement via one of its subsidiary to acquire 31 percent stake in startup Ayena Innovation which deals in home furnishings and interior decoration sector.

In May 2023, JSW Steel reached an in-principle agreement with JFE Steel to establish a 50:50 joint venture to manufacture cold-rolled grain-oriented (CRGO) electrical steel in India.

In March 2024, JSW Steel Italy SRL inked an MoU with the Government of Italy to invest €140 million in restarting production at the Piombino plant. JSW Steel's fate in Italy hinged largely on contracts from Italian railway authorities. Faced with this uncertainty and rising costs due to geopolitical issues like the Russo-Ukrainian War, the company explored disinvestment. However, this new agreement aims to double rail-making capacity to 600,000 tonnes per year in Piombino, enhancing local employment and reducing imports. Investments will modernize the rail mill with a tandem mill, head hardening facility, and longer rails (from 108 to 120 meters).

=== Mining acquisitions ===
JSW Steel currently possesses a total of 13 iron ore mines, with nine located in Karnataka and four in Odisha. Additionally, they have obtained three coking coal mines. During the fiscal year 2022, the company fulfilled 43% of its iron ore needs from its own mines.

In May 2023, JSW Steel bagged iron ore blocks in the Surjagarh area of Maoist-affected Gadchiroli district in Maharashtra after bidding for a composite license through government auctions.

In the past, JSW Steel has additionally acquired mining assets in the United States, the Republic of Chile, and Mozambique.

== Ownership ==
Largest shareholders (2026)
Rank	Name of owner	Percentage ownership
1	JFE Holdings	15.00
2	O.P. Jindal Group of Cos.	10.82
3	JSW Holdings	7.418
4	Vividh Finvest	5.863
5	Life Insurance Corporation	5.328
	Others	55.571
	Total	100.00

== In media ==
=== Documentary ===
- JSW: Architect Of Dreams, a documentary film premiered at National Geographic India on 16 March 2024.
