= Ispat Steel =

Indian company

Ispat Steel Limited
- Traded as: BSE: 500305; NSE: ISPATIND
- Industry: Steel
- Founded: 1984; 42 years ago
- Defunct: 2013; 13 years ago
- Fate: Acquired by JSW Steel
- Headquarters: Kalmeshwar, Nagpur, India
- Key people: Sajjan Jindal (Chairman), B.K Singh (Chief executive officer)
- Products: Sponge iron, Hot Rolled Coils, Cold Rolled Coils, Galvanized Sheets/ Coils, Colour Coated Sheets
- Revenue: ▲₹10,578.69 crore (US$1.1 billion) (2010)
- Net income: ▼₹−322.34 crore (US$−34 million)
- Number of employees: 3,000 (2008)

Ispat Steel Ltd (ISL) was an Indian company with operations in iron, steel, mining, energy and infrastructure. In 2012, it was acquired by JSW Steel.

The company had two integrated steel plants, at Dolvi and Kalameshwar in the state of Maharashtra. The 1,200 acres (4.9 km^{2}) Dolvi complex housed the 30 lakh tonne per annum hot rolled coils plant, which used the Conarc process for steel making as well as the compact strip process. The Dolvi complex has a captive port located close to it on the Amba River, which opens into the Arabian Sea, that can handle barges and mini-bulk carriers up to 4,000 Dead Weight Tonnage (DWT). Moreover, a jetty adjoining the complex is capable of handling cargo of up to 1 crore (10 million) tonnes per annum. It has a direct reduced iron – sponge iron plant, blast furnace, and compact strip production. The integrated steel plant at Kalmeshwar produced galvanised sheets and products and cold rolled coils. The Kalmeshwar complex houses a total of three advanced plants – a 3.25 lakh tonnes galvanised plain/galvanised corrugated plant, a 3.3 lakh tonne Cold rolled coils plant and a 60,000 tonne colour coated sheets plant. It had a cold rolling mill, galvanization line, and a colour coating line.

Ispat was the only steel maker in India and among a few in the world to have total flexibility in the choice of the steel making route - either via blast furnace or by electric arc furnace.

Ispat means steel in Hindi and the Bengali language.

== History ==
The company was founded in 1984 as Nippon Denro Ispat Limited by Mohan Lal Mittal.

It was granted the first industrial license by the Government of India for manufacturing galvanised plain/corrugated sheets. IIL was set up as a cold rolling reversing mill, in collaboration with Hitachi of Japan, to manufacture a wide range of cold rolled carbon steel strips.

In 1994, the family split its interests: the eldest son, Lakshmi Mittal continued managing the international operations as Ispat International (later called Mittal Steel Company), while Pramod Mittal and Vinod Mittal, the younger brothers, focused on steel and other businesses in India.

In 1994, it commissioned the world's largest gas-based single mega module plant for manufacturing direct reduced iron (sponge iron), at its Maharashtra-based Dolvi plant, with a capacity of 1.6 million tons.

In 1995, hot strip mill with Continuous Strip Processing (CSP) technology was installed at Dolvi.

In 1998, an integrated steel plant for the production of hot rolled coils was launched, using technologies such as the Conarc Process for steel making and the Compact Strip Process. The company continued to increase capacity in the early 2000s; in 2003, a 2-million tonne blast furnace was commissioned and sponge iron capacity was increased from 1.2 mtpa to 1.4 mtpa.

During the early 2000s recession, heavy losses forced the company, as well as Essar Steel and JSW Steel, into debt restructurings.

However, the company was not able to implement a turnaround and in 2010, losses reached Rs 2,500 crore.

In 2010, JSW acquired a 41.57% interest in the company for ₹2157 crore and renamed it JSW Ispat Steel. It acquired the remainder of the company in 2013 based on an enterprise value of $3 billion. The acquisition was described as a "bailout" for Ispat Steel.
