= Parth Jindal =

Indian businessman (born 1990)

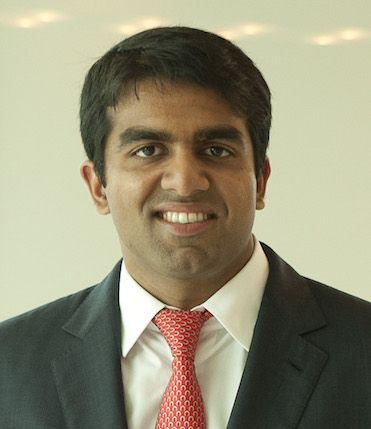
- MD of JSW Cement, JSW Paints & CEO of Bengaluru FC
- Born: 19 May 1990 (age 36)
- Education: Brown University; Harvard Business School
- Spouse: Anushree Jasani
- Parents: Sajjan Jindal (father); Sangita Jindal (mother)
- Family: Jindal family
- Website: www.jsw.in

Parth Jindal (born 19 May 1990) is an Indian businessman and scion of JSW Group. He is also the chairman of JSW MG Motors India.

== Early life and education ==
Jindal is the youngest of three children of Sajjan Jindal and Sangita Jindal. An alumnus of Cathedral and John Connon School from Mumbai and Sevenoaks School in England, he earned a BA in economics and political science from Brown University in 2012, and an MBA from Harvard Business School in 2016.

== Career ==
Jindal joined the JSW Group as an economic analyst in 2012 and also did a secondment with JFE Steel Japan for six months. Prior to that, he worked with Falcon Edge Capital, a hedge fund in New York City. At JSW Group, he initially oversaw strategic projects such as JSW Cement and JSW Steel USA.

Jindal led a group that built a 2.3 million-ton auto-grade steel plant in Vijaynagar, Bellary before he went to Harvard University in 2014. At that time, the plant was dubbed the first Indian steel establishment to manufacture auto steel because, until then, all major Indian car makers were importing high-quality steel for car panels from South Korea, Japan, or Germany.

=== JSW Cement ===
Jindal was appointed managing director of JSW Cement in June 2014. Upon taking charge of cement business, he changed business strategies, restructured the organisation, and appointed new executives. By December 2021, the company was aiming to expand from 14 MPTA to 20 MPTA.

In February 2022, Jindal was appointed as a chair at Global Cement & Concrete Association (GCCA) India. In 2024, he was re-elected as chair. In July 2023, Jindal appointed as a vice-president of Cement Manufacturer's Association.

=== JSW Energy ===
On 23 December 2022, JSW Energy got approval from the firm's shareholders to appoint Jindal to a director position on the board of the company.

=== JSW USA ===
Jindal is the director of JSW USA.

=== JSW Paints ===
While at Harvard, professor Das Narayandas collaborated with Jindal and three others to brainstorm ideas on paints. The JSW Group announced the launch of JSW Paints on 2 May 2019 with Jindal as its managing director.

=== JSW Sports ===
Jindal is the founder of JSW Sports, which runs the ISL Football Club Bengaluru FC, Delhi based IPL Team Delhi Capitals, Pro Kabaddi team Haryana Steelers, Hockey India League team Soorma Hockey Club and the Inspire Institute of Sport. Jindal is also the founder of the Inspire Institute of Sport (IIS) in Vijayanagara district that was formally launched on 15 August 2018. Spread across 42 acres, the Institute comprises a training centre that provides Indian athletes access to coaching and sports science.

=== JSW Venture Fund ===
Jindal is the director at the JSW Venture Fund and oversees the management of it.

=== MG Motor India ===
In November 2023, Jindal signed a share purchase and share subscription agreement with the president of SAIC Motor, Wang Xiaoqiu at MG Motor’s UK headquarters in London. Currently, he serves as a director of JSW MG Motor India.

In August 2026, he was appointed as the chairman of the MG Motor India.

=== JSW Defence and Aerospace ===
In 2024, Parth Jindal was appointed to lead JSW Defence and Aerospace, the JSW Group's new defence manufacturing vertical. He led the acquisition of Gecko Motors, by securing a ₹250 crore (US$26 million) crore contract for all-terrain vehicles supplied to the Indian Army, and announced a $90 million partnership with Shield AI to manufacture V-BAT drones in India.

=== Other ventures ===
Jindal's wife Anushree Jindal oversees a micro-finance venture, Svamaan Financial Services, that is 100% owned by the couple.

== Philanthropy ==
=== Project Yashoda ===
Jindal supervised the creation of an Android-based mobile application that tracks the developmental indicators of children under six. Consequently, the prevalence of malnutrition in the three talukas of Palghar, in which the JSW Foundation is active, has reportedly decreased. In 2014, then-Chief Minister Devendra Fadnavis of Maharashtra gave the order for the technology to be implemented throughout the state.

== Personal life ==
Parth is married to Anushree Jindal (née Jasani). They have a daughter born in April 2019.
