= Inspire Institute of Sport =

High performance training centre for athletes in India

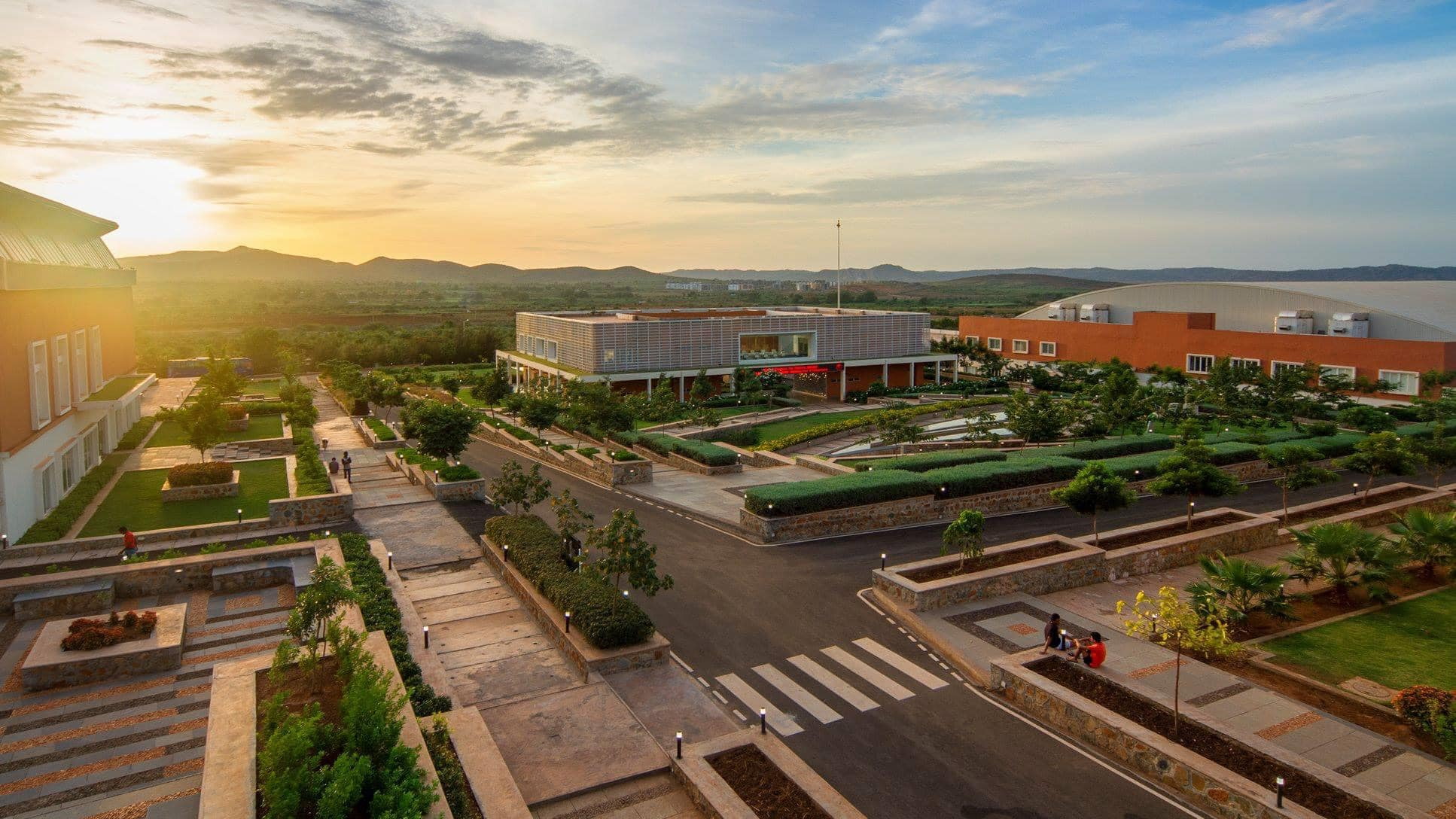
- Abbreviation: IIS
- Formation: 2018
- Headquarters: Vidyanagar, Bellary district, Karnataka
- Region served: India
- CEO: Rushdee Warley
- Parent organization: JSW Sports
- Website: www.inspireinstituteofsport.com

Inspire Institute of Sport (IIS) is India's first privately-funded high performance training centre for athletes. Founded by the JSW Group, the facility is spread over 42 acres in Vidyanagar, Bellary district, Karnataka. The institute provides full scholarships to athletes scouted from across the country in athletics, boxing, judo, swimming and wrestling.

According to Parth Jindal, the founder of IIS, the inspiration for starting the institute came from Abhinav Bindra's gold-medal win at the 2008 Summer Olympics. The construction of the institute began in 2014 in a hillock area in Vijayanagar, about 30 km away from Hampi and adjacent to JSW Group's Vidyanagar township. The construction of a 42000 sq. ft sports combat hall, a 16,000 sq. ft strength and conditioning centre and hostels was completed in April 2017, while the athletics track and a sports medicine centre was completed in 2018. An aquatics centre is expected to be prepared by 2019. The centre will also be the base for JSW Sports-owned Bengaluru FC's youth teams. The entire facility reportedly cost ₹100 crore.

IIS is recognized by Sports Authority of India as a Khelo India-accredited development centre for boxing and wrestling. The athletics track has been approved by the International Association of Athletics Federations while the aquatics centre will have the approval of FINA.

IIS was inaugurated on 15 August 2018, on the occasion of India's 72nd Independence Day. The facility, however, had been under use for over a year before the inauguration; among the athletes who have undergone training and rehab at IIS include Vinesh Phogat and Olympic gold medalist Neeraj Chopra.
