= Welspun Corp =

Indian company

Welspun Corp Limited
- Company type: Public
- Traded as: BSE: 532144; NSE: WELCORP
- Industry: Pipe Solutions and building materials
- Founded: 1995
- Headquarters: Mumbai, Maharashtra, India
- Key people: B. K. Goenka (Chairman), Vipul Mathur (MD & CEO)
- Revenue: ▲₹10,078.08 crore (US$1.1 billion) (FY23)
- Net income: ▲₹206.69 crore (US$22 million) (FY23)
- Parent: Welspun World

Welspun Corp Limited (Welspun Gujarat Stahl Rohren) is an Indian multinational company with its headquarters in Mumbai, India. It specializes in manufacturing large-diameter pipes and operates in multiple countries across six continents. Its manufacturing facilities are located in Anjar (Gujarat), Bhopal (Madhya Pradesh), Mandya (Karnataka), Jhagadia (Gujarat), and Little Rock, Arkansas, in the US.

In 2020, Welspun Corp entered the DI pipes business with an installed capacity of 500,000 tonnes at its Anjar facility. The facility was commissioned in July of the same year and started operations in 2022. In 2023, Welspun Corp's subsidiary, Welspun DI Pipes, was awarded the Kitemark certificate by BSI UK for the size range of 100 to 1,000 DN against EN 545 and ISO 2531 standards. In March 2023, the company acquired Sintex, a water tank manufacturer, for Rs 1251 crores, as part of its strategy to expand its building materials portfolio. Welspun Corp also acquired specified assets of ABG Shipyard for Rs 659 crores.

== History ==
=== 1995–2005 ===
Welspun Corp was incorporated in 1995 under the name Welspun Gujarat Stahl Rohren Limited, with technical collaboration from Intertec GmbH, Germany, and equity participation from Intertec GmbH and Gujarat Industrial Investment Corporation Ltd. The company runs facilities in Anjar, Gujarat and Mandya, Karnataka, India. It also has a plate and coil mill facility in India. In 2004, the company expanded its operations to include the production of high-frequency induction weld (HFIW) pipes and set up a new manufacturing facility in December of that year.

The company started its pipe coating operations through a partnership with Eupec Pipe Coatings Ltd in France. Subsequently, there was a consolidation within the company as it merged its joint venture entity, Eupec Welspun Pipecoating India, with Welspun Stahl. This collaborative unit, that was established in the late '90s in partnership with the German company Eupec Pipecoating GmBH, became integrated into Welspun Stahl.

=== 2006–2010 ===
In October 2006, the company announced a 40:60 joint venture with TMK Group, Russia's largest manufacturer and exporter of pipe products in the oil and gas sector.

In December, the company entered into an agreement to establish a joint venture with Lone Star Technologies, a U.S.-based company, to manufacture spiral-welded tubular products for the oil and gas industry. As per the agreement, Lone Star and Welspun Pipe, a wholly owned subsidiary of Welspun-Gujarat Stahl Rohren, acquired 40% and 60% stakes, respectively, in the newly formed company named Welspun Lone Star Tubulars. However, Lone Star was acquired by US Steel in April 2007 for $2 billion. In July 2007, Welspun decided to withdraw from the joint venture with Lone Star and announced the establishment of a new wholly owned subsidiary in the U.S. with an investment of $150 million.

In May 2009, Welspun Gujarat Stahl Rohren opened a $150 million plant in the U.S. for the production of steel pipes. In March 2010, the company bought a 75% stake in the construction firm MSK Projects India for Rs 400 crore through its subsidiary, Welspun Infratech. Lauri Antero Malkki became the CEO of the company in March 2023. Also, in 2010, the company rebranded from Welspun Gujarat Stahl Rohren to Welspun Corp Limited.

=== 2011–2024 ===
In August 2015, Welspun Corp teamed up with the Malaysian Wasco Energy to set up a concrete weight coating (CWC) plant in Anjar, Gujarat. In 2018, the company was awarded the gold medal in the National Awards for Manufacturing Competitiveness and the Greentech Environment Gold Award by International Research Institute for Manufacturing, India (IRIM). In 2020, Welspun Corp won the Golden Peacock National Quality Award.

In October 2022, the company started operations at the Ductile Iron Pipes facility in Anjar through its wholly owned subsidiary, Welspun DI Pipes Limited. Also, in 2022, Welspun Metallics opened a manufacturing facility in Gujarat with an investment of Rs. 2000 crore. In 2022, WCL acquired specified assets from ABG Shipyard, and in the first quarter of 2023, completed the acquisition of the Plastic Products business of Sintex BAPL.

== Divisions ==
- The Welspun Pipes Division manufactures pipes from Dahej (Gujarat), Anjar (Gujarat) and Mandya (Karnataka) in India and Little Rock, Arkansas in the U.S.
- Welspun Plates and Coil manufactures plates up to 4.5 meters wide and coils up to 2.8 meters wide.
- Welspun Tubular LLC (USA): This spiral pipe and coating facility is spread across 740 acres and has an annual capacity of 350,000 tons near Little Rock Port, Arkansas. Welspun Tubular LLC begins production at its new electric-resistance welded (ERW) steel pipe mill in Little Rock, Ark., in 2012 according to a company executive.
- Welspun Natural Resources Ltd is a joint venture with Adani Group. It has a portfolio of eight oil and gas assets across India, Thailand and Egypt.
- Welspun Energy Ltd was incorporated to set up thermal power plants and solar energy power generating facilities.
