= JSW Group =

Indian multinational conglomerate

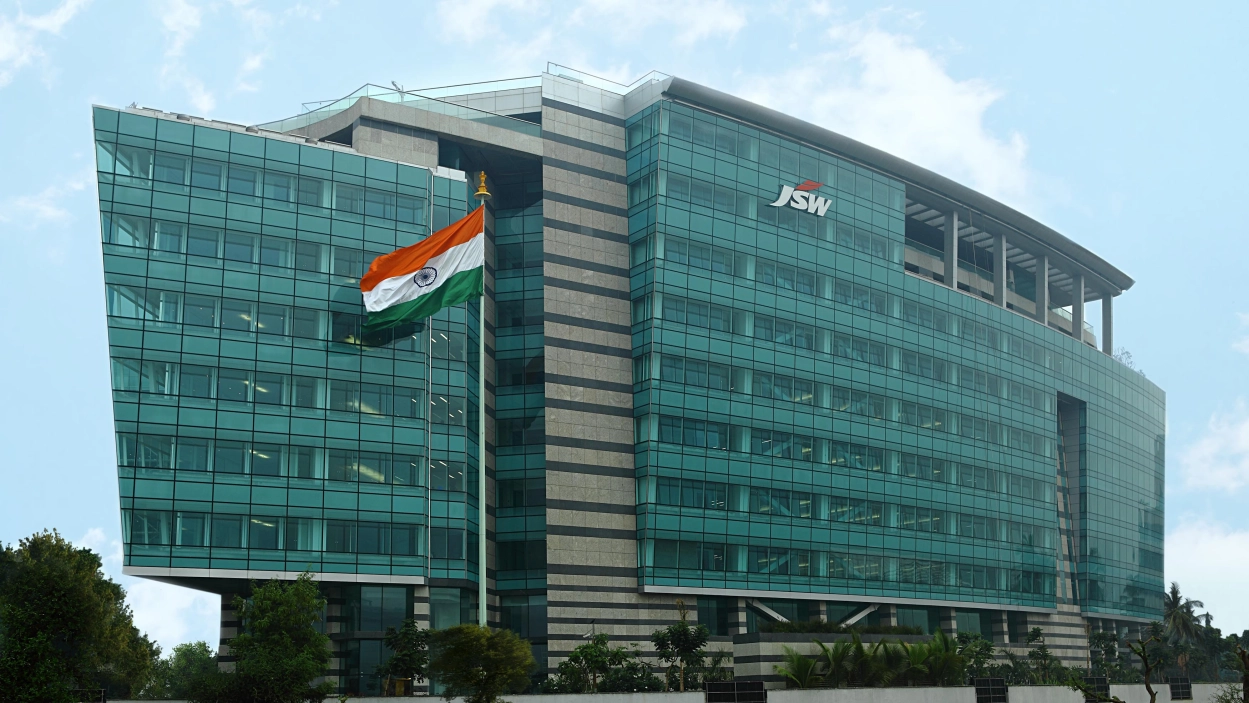
- Headquarters in Bandra Kurla Complex, Mumbai
- Formerly: Jindal South West
- Type: Private
- Industry: Conglomerate
- Founded: 1982; 44 years ago
- Founder: Sajjan Jindal
- Headquarters: Mumbai, Maharashtra, India
- Area served: Worldwide
- Key people: Sajjan Jindal (Chairman); Sangita Jindal (Chairperson, JSW Foundation); Parth Jindal (MD, JSW Cement)
- Products: Steel; Energy; Infrastructure; Cement; Paint; Investment; Sports; Automotive
- Revenue: ▲US$23 billion
- Owner: Jindal family
- Number of employees: 55,000
- Subsidiaries: JSW Steel; JSW Energy; JSW Cement; JSW MG Motor India; Ampstar
- Website: www.jsw.in

JSW Group is an Indian multinational conglomerate, based in Mumbai. It is led by Sajjan Jindal and founded by Om Prakash Jindal. The group's diverse businesses include steel, energy, infrastructure, cement, automotive and paints, across India, the United States, South America, and Africa.

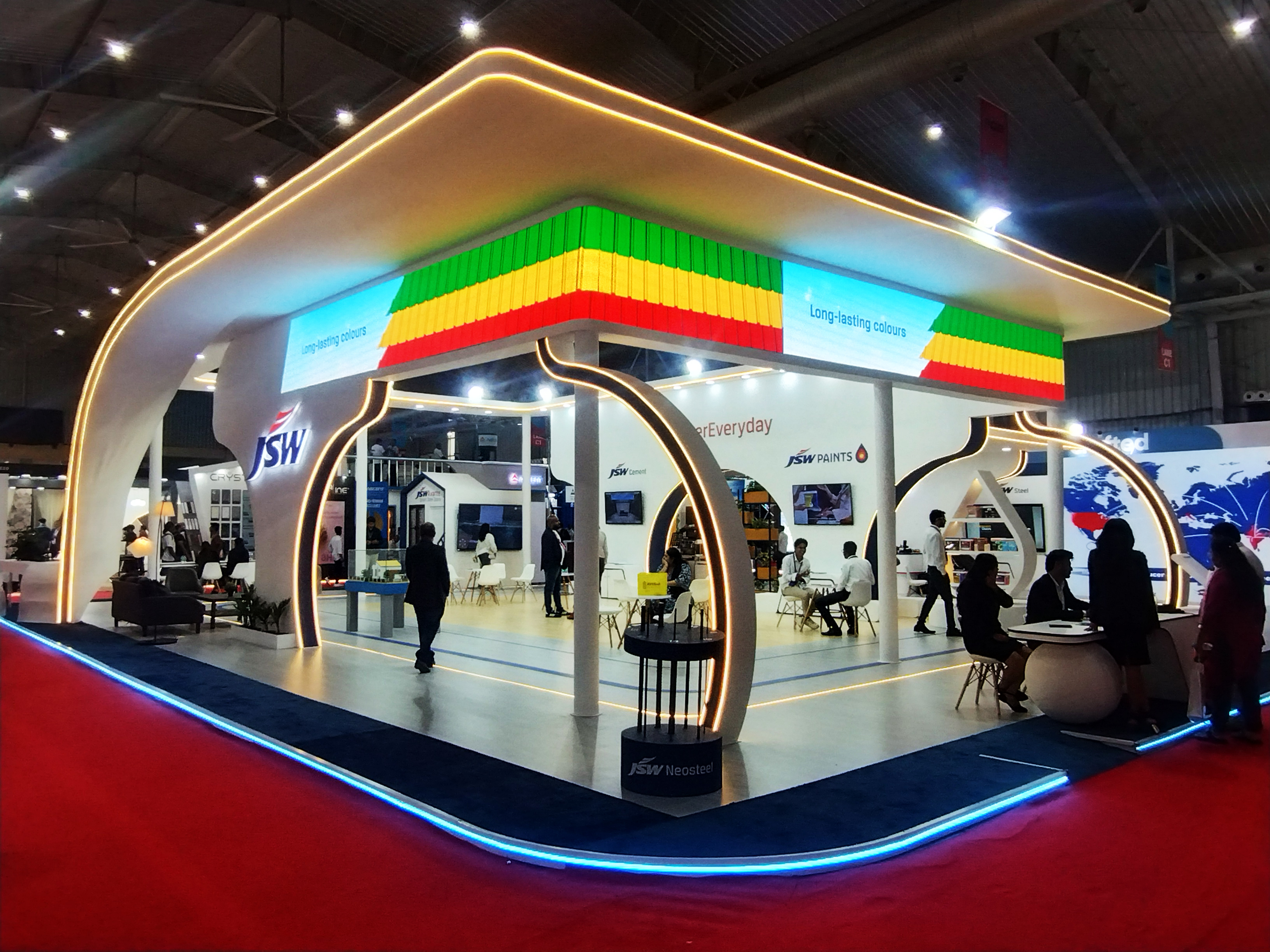
JSW at Acetech 2025, BIEC

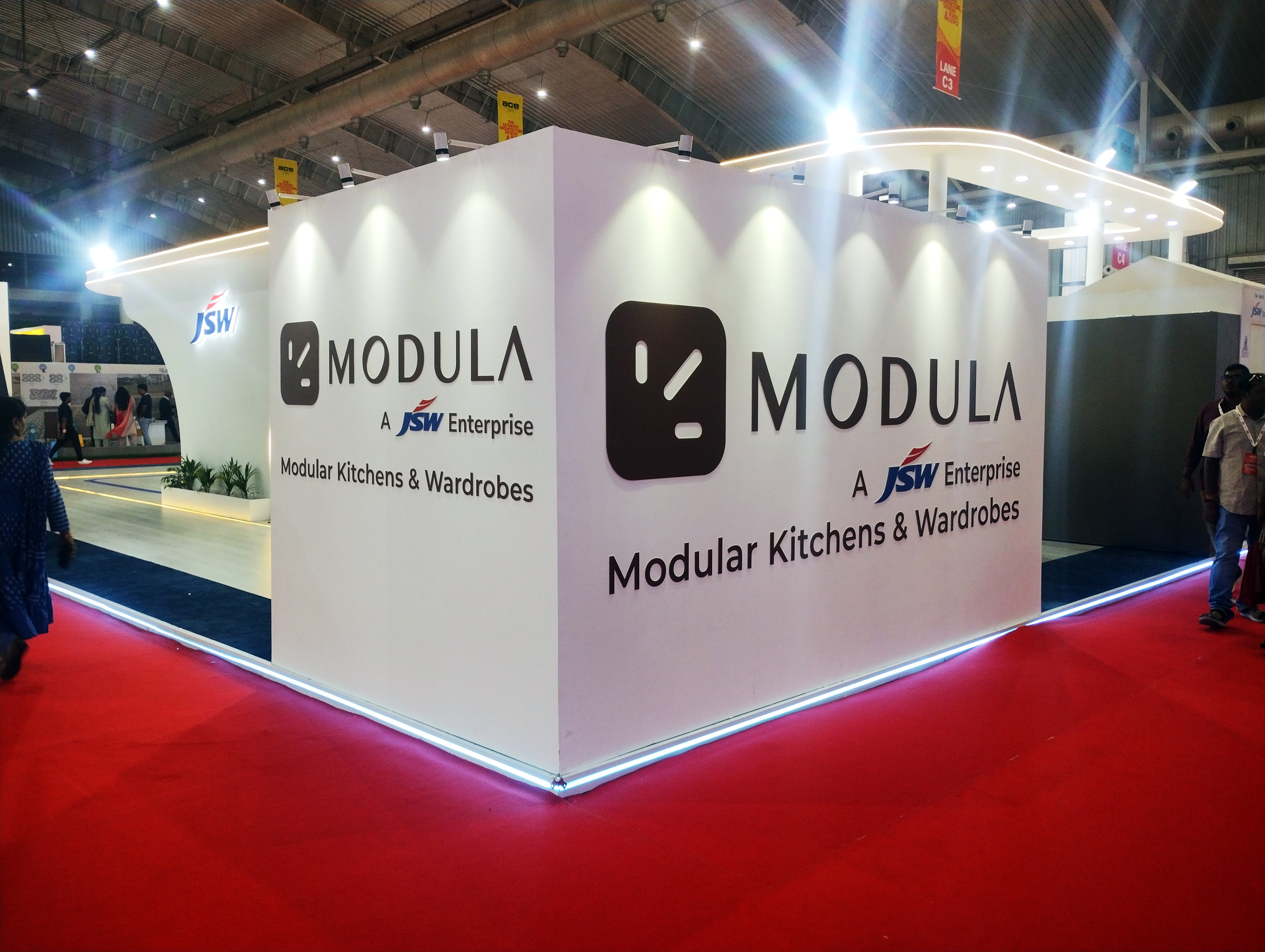
JSW Enterprise's Modula at Acetech 2025, BIEC

== History ==
=== 1982–1994 ===
The JSW Group was founded in 1982 when Jindal acquired a re-rolling mill located in Tarapur, Maharashtra, near Mumbai, from Piramal Steel. Following the acquisition, the group renamed it Jindal Iron and Steel Company (JISCO). Subsequently, in the same year, the group established its first steel plant in Vasind, near Mumbai.

=== 1994–2005 ===
Jindal Vijayanagar Steel Limited (JVSL) was established in 1994. Situated at Toranagallu in the Ballari-Hospet region of Karnataka. In 2004, JSW acquired Salem Steel Works. Next year, in 2005 JISCO and JVSL merged to create JSW Steel.

In 1994, JSW Energy Limited was established as power company, focusing on power generation, transmission and trading.

In 1999, JSW Infrastructure was founded to construct and operate airports, shipyards, townships, roads and rail connectivity, inland waterways, water treatment plants, special economic zones and other infrastructural facilities.

=== 2008–2014 ===
In 2008, JSW Group entered in Georgia to manufacture rebar at Rustavi. The acquisition of an integrated steel plant at Dolvi, Maharashtra, in 2010 and, the acquisition of Welspun Maxsteel in 2014 marked as a diversification in the group's history.

In 2009, JSW Group entered the cement business by establishing JSW Cement and established production facilities in various locations including Vijaynagar, Nandyal (Andhra Pradesh), Dolvi, Jaipur, Shiva (Odisha), Salboni (West Bengal), and Fujairah (United Arab Emirates).

=== 2018–2020 ===
In 2018, JSW Group purchased Italy's Aferpi. Also, investments were made in a greenfield Texas plant and the takeover of bankrupt Bhushan Power. In 2020, JSW's purchase of Bhushan Power faced legal challenges, but the group went ahead in acquiring the stakes.

On 2 May 2019, JSW Group established JSW Paints with a total investment of ₹600 crore (US$62 million), with ₹250 crore of equity investment and a ₹350 crore debt investment from Axis Bank.

=== 2021–2025 ===
In 2021, JSW Steel Italy acquired a stake in GSI Lucchini and set a CO_{2} reduction target for 2030. In 2022, they planned the merger of JISPL and CSSL subsidiaries and secured approval for a greenfield steel plant in Andhra Pradesh. In 2013, the group entered into a collaboration with Japan's JFE Holdings in the electrical steel sector. In December 2023, JSW Infrastructure announced plans to acquire a majority stake in PNP Port for ₹270 crore.

In April 2024, JSW Steel raised a $900 million syndicated loan from a consortium of eight foreign banks (Singapore's DBS Bank, France's BNP Paribas, UK's HSBC and Standard Chartered, UAE's Mashreq Bank and First Abu Dhabi Bank, Japan's Sumitomo Mitsui Banking Corp (SMBC) and Taiwan's CTBC Bank) to refinance debt facilities and repay expensive loans ahead of schedule.

In December 2024, JSW Group entered the non-ferrous metals sector by adding copper to its metal portfolio through the acquisition of two Jharkhand copper mines. As of March 2025, the group plans to build a 500,000 metric ton copper smelter in Odisha by 2028-29, using copper concentrate from Peru and Chile.

In December 2024, JSW Neo Energy purchased the O2 Power platform from EQT and Temasek for $1.5 billion.

== Group companies ==
=== Listed ===
- JSW Cement – It has a production capacity of 20.620.6 MTPA..
- JSW Energy – The company has a power generation capacity of 6,564 MW, including thermal, hydro, pumped storage, and solar power.
- JSW Holdings – JSW Holdings is a Non-Banking Financial Company (NBFC) that forms the investment arm of the JSW Group.
- JSW Infrastructure – Based in Mumbai, its primary business interests are in the development of infrastructure for ports, roads, and rail connectivity. As of June 2026, the company operates 13 ports and terminals in India and one terminal in the UAE, with a total operational capacity of 183 million tonnes per year.
- JSW Steel – It is the main steel manufacturing company of the group and has an installed capacity of 35.7 MTPA.

=== Unlisted ===
- JSW Defence and Aerospace – The company was established in 2024 by acquiring a 51% stake in Gecko Motors Private Ltd., which specializes in extreme off-road vehicles. Following the acquisition, Gecko Motors has been rebranded as JSW Gecko Motors. In November 2024, Shield AI partnered with JSW Defense to manufacture the V-BAT drones in India. JSW shall be investing $90 million over the next 2 years of which $65 million will be invested within 12 months to establish a "global compliance programme", manufacturing facility, technology licensing and train parsonnel.
- JSW Paints – There are two manufacturing facilities under its operation, with one dedicated to industrial coatings located in Vasind (Maharashtra), and the other focused on decorative coatings situated in Vijayanagar. The combined capacity of these two plants is 170,000 kilolitres. In December 2025, JSW Paints announced the acquisition of a 74.76% stake iin Akzo Nobel India Limited (ANIL) from AkzoNobel.
- JSW Port Logistics - A wholly owned subsidiary of JSW Infrastructure, dealing with warehousing, and container freight stations.
- JSW Ventures – JSW Ventures is the venture capital arm of JSW Group which invests in early-stage Indian startups.
- JSW Realty – It is the real-estate arm of the group, focusing on sustainable residential and commercial projects.
- JSW Sports – Through JSW Sports, the group also owns the Indian Premier League cricket team Delhi Capitals, the Women's Premier League cricket team Delhi Capitals, the SA20 cricket team Pretoria Capitals, the Indian Super League football team Bengaluru FC, the Hockey India League team Soorma Hockey Club, and the Pro Kabaddi League team Haryana Steelers. It also operates Inspire Institute of Sport, a 42-acre high performance training centre in the outskirts of Vidyanagar, Ballari district.
- JSW One Platforms – Launched in 2021, it comprises two entities: JSW One MSME and JSW One Homes. Together, it provides digital services for MSMEs and home construction respectively. In September 2026, the company filed it's draft paper for an IPO.
- JSW Neo Energy - In 2021, JSW Energy transferred its renewable energy portfolio to JSW Neo Energy. This included the transfer of 100% equity shares in JSW Renew Energy (Kar), JSW Renewable Energy (Dolvi), and JSW Energy (Kutehr). In December 2024, the company acquired a 4,696 MW renewable energy platform from O2 Power Pooling Pte, owned by EQT Infrastructure and Temasek, for ₹12,468 crore. The platform has a ₹3.37/KWh average tariff and a 23-year remaining life, with capacities across seven Indian states.

=== Joint-ventures ===
- JSW MG Motor India, on 30 November 2023, China's SAIC Motor and the JSW Group formed a strategic joint venture, resulting in the latter gaining a 35% stake in MG Motor India through this partnership. As of July 2025, JSW Group is set to increase its stake in MG Motor India by acquiring the remaining 49% held by SAIC, bringing its total holding to 84%, as the Chinese automaker exits the Indian market.
- JSW Steel-JFE Steel JV In December 2025, JSW Steel formed a 50:50 joint venture with Japan's JFE Steel for the steel facility of Bhushan Power & Steel Limited in Odisha, which JSW had acquired in 2021 through insolvency proceedings. JFE Steel agreed to invest ₹15,750 crore (US$1.6 billion) in two tranches for its 50% stake, following the transfer of BPSL's steel business to the JV entity via a slump sale.

== Research and development ==
- JSW School of Public Policy (JSW-SPP), Indian Institute of Management Ahmedabad – The institute was inaugurated in February 2023 with its architectural design led by Rahul Mehrotra.
- JSW Technology Hub for Manufacturing of Steel (JSW-TH), IIT Bombay – The technology hub is actively engaged in several research domains. These include decarbonization, green hydrogen, and solid waste management.
- JSW Centre for the Future of Law, National Law School of India University – In 2024, JSW Group awarded a grant to renovate and expand a core academic block of the university and to establish an interdisciplinary policy research centre.
- JSW Center of Excellence for Smart Grid Technologies, Ramaiah Institute of Technology – In July 2024, the group signed a Memorandum of Understanding (MoU) with MS Ramaiah Institute of Technology and Sharika Smartec to establish the Center of Excellence for Smart Grid technologies at the MSRIT campus in Bengaluru.

== Philanthropy ==
The JSW Foundation, established in 1987, works in education, healthcare, skill development, and heritage conservation. It is involved in restoration projects, including the preservation and restoration of significant archaeological ruins like Hampi (and setting up Hampi Art Labs), Mughal Gardens of Kashmir (Shalimar Bagh and Nishat Bagh), Knesset Eliyahoo Synagogue, Maragondanahalli Lake in Bengaluru, David Sassoon Library, Shiv Khori, Gulmarg Ski Resort etc.

=== COVID-19 ===
In May 2020, right at the outset of the COVID-19 pandemic in India, JSW Group pledged more than ₹100 crore to aid the relief initiatives led by PM CARES Fund and other State governments in their battle against the COVID-19 crisis.

During the second wave of COVID-19 pandemic in Karnataka in 2021, JSW Group established a temporary 1,000-bed COVID-19 hospital in Ballari, located near its township. Also, the company installed a dedicated 5 km-long oxygen supply pipeline from its Vijayanagar steel plant to directly serve patients at the new hospital under construction. In a related effort, the group repurposed its multi-speciality Jindal Sanjeevani Hospital near Dolvi unit in Maharashtra to function as a COVID-19 treatment facility.

=== Scholarships ===
==== Udaan scholarships ====
The JSW Udaan Scholarships supports students from economically weaker sections of India in paying university tuition fees. Eligible candidates from families earning below ₹8 lakh (US$8,300) lakhs annually can receive up to ₹50,000 (US$520), which is directly deposited into their bank accounts.

== Gallery ==
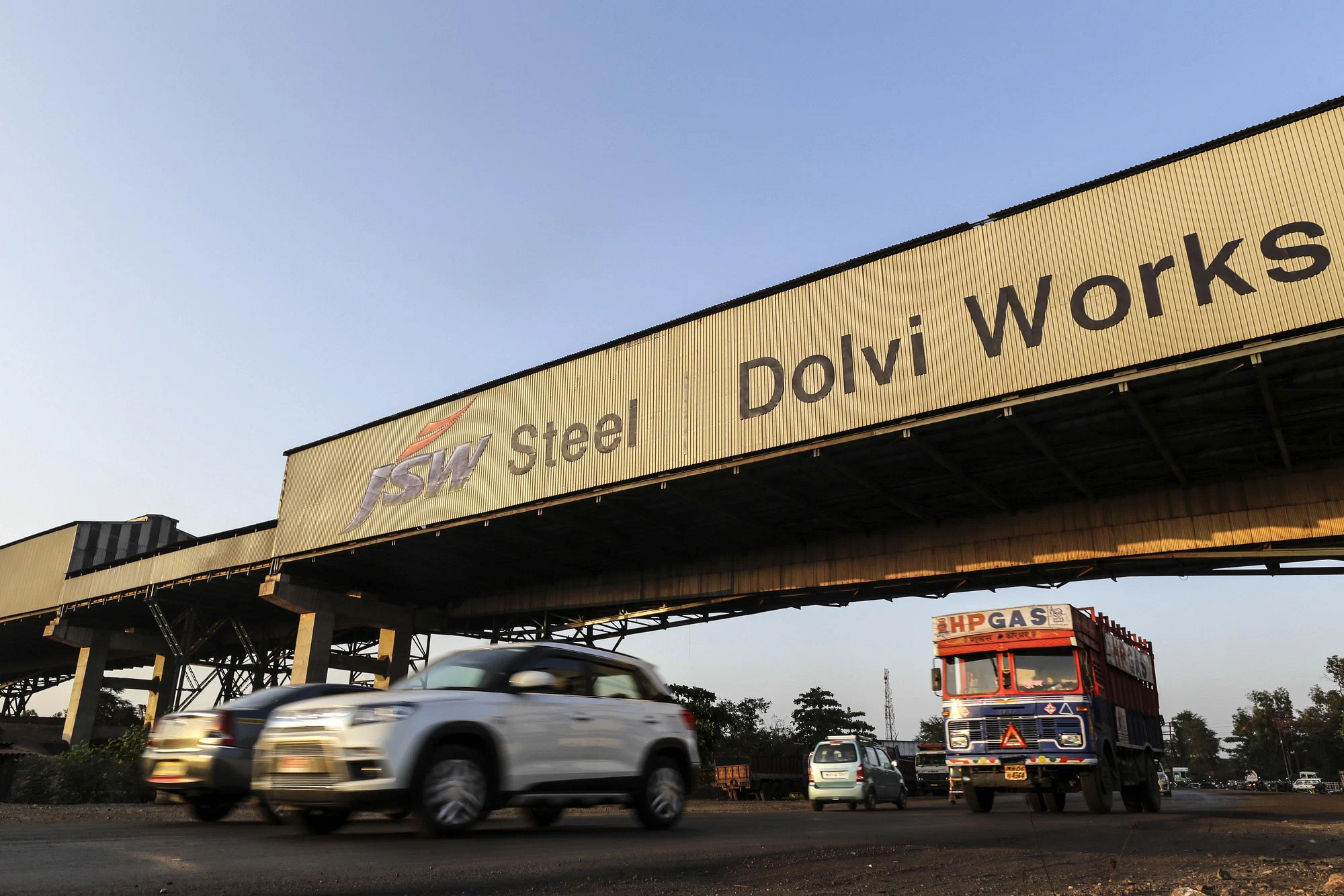
JSW Steel Dolvi Works, Maharashtra, India

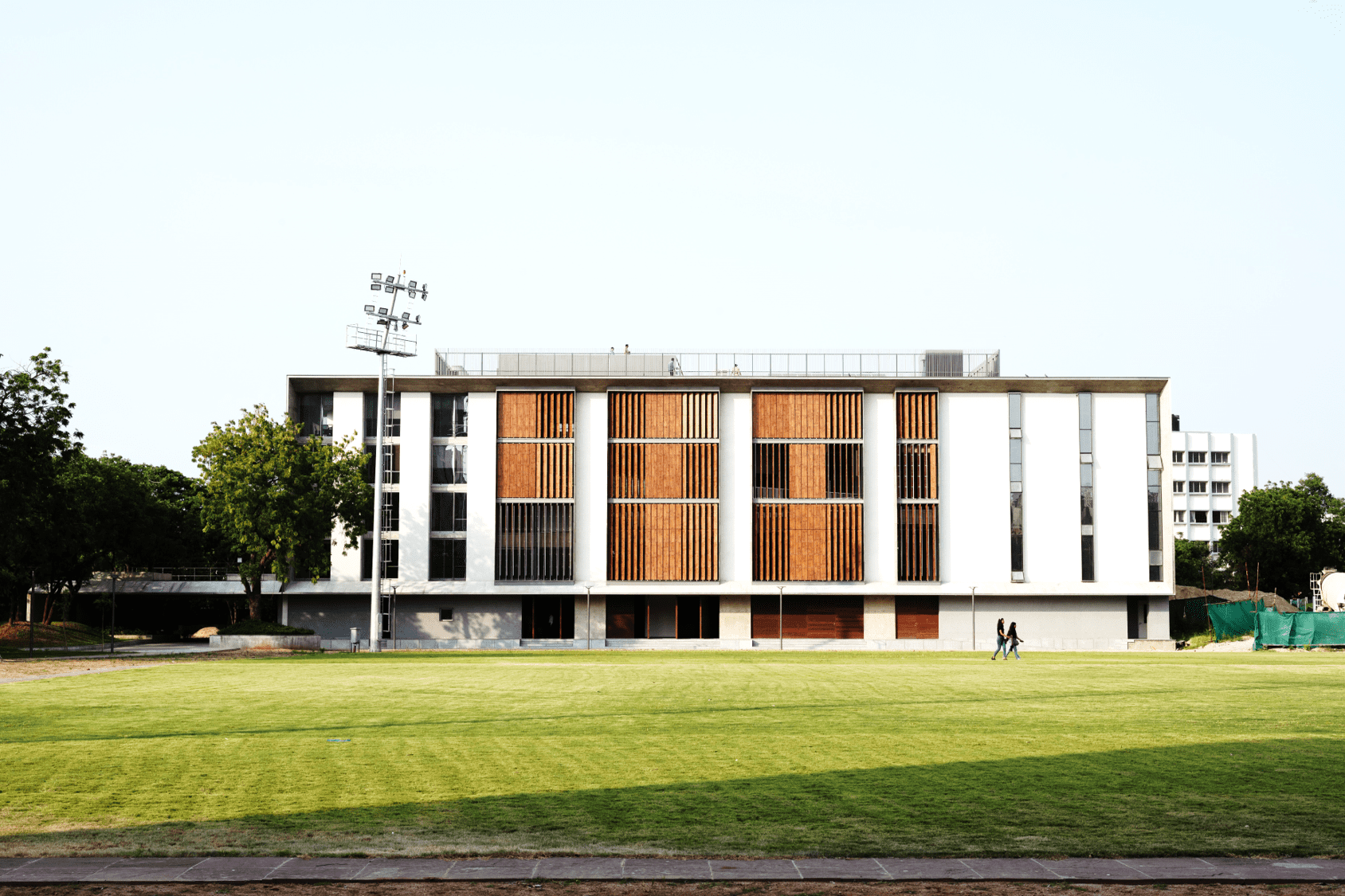
JSW School of Public Policy (JSW-SPP), Indian Institute of Management Ahmedabad

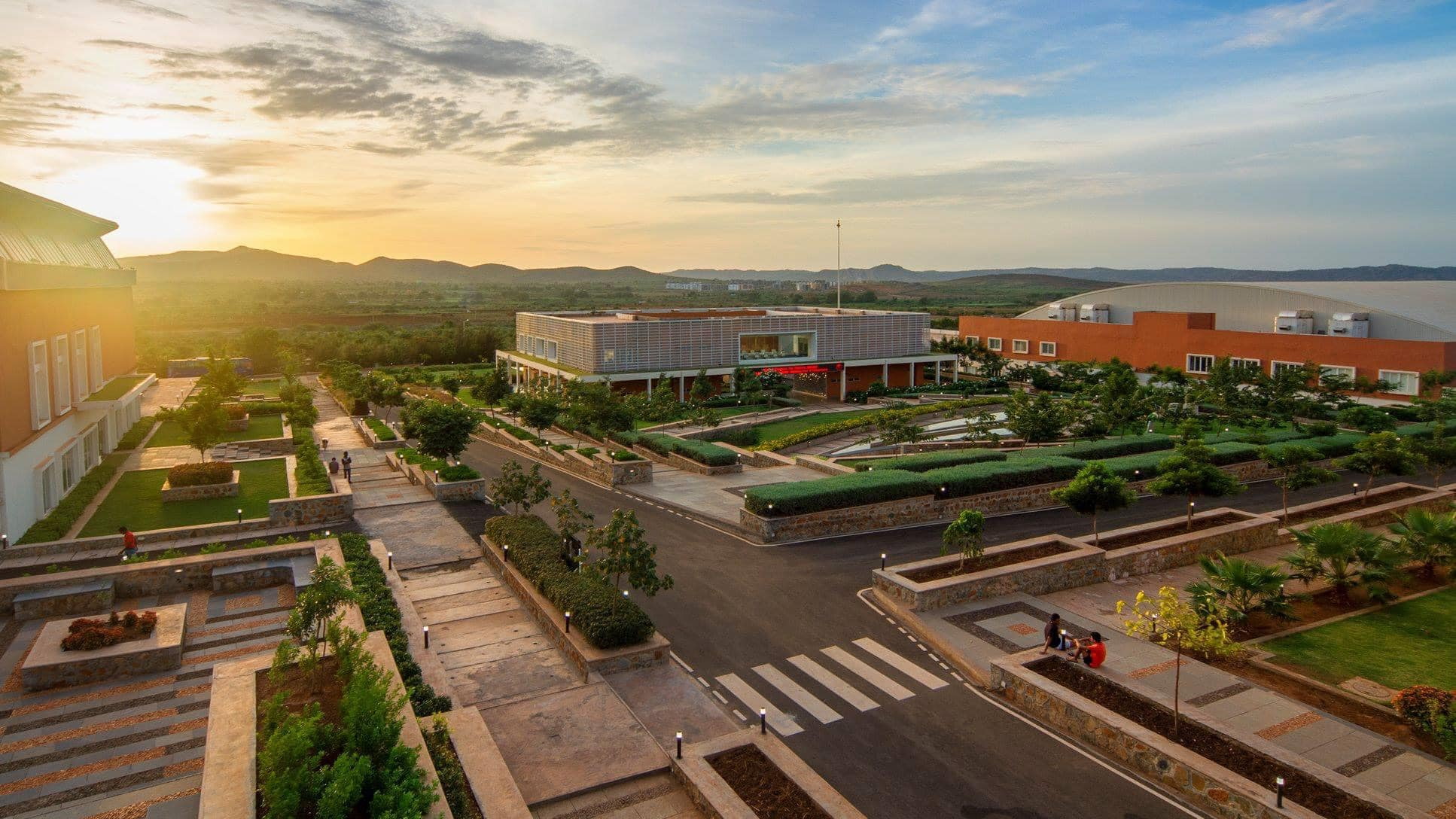
Inspire Institute of Sport
