= Bhushan Power & Steel =

Indian steel company

JSW Bhushan Power & Steel Limited
- Type: Private
- Industry: Steel
- Founded: 1970
- Headquarters: New Delhi, India
- Owner: Sajjan Jindal
- Parent: JSW Steel
- Website: www.jswsteel.in/bhushan-power-steel-limited-works

Not to be confused with Bhushan Steel, another company promoted by the same family

JSW Bhushan Power & Steel Limited (JSW BPSL) formerly known as Bhushan Power & Steel Limited is a steel company that is engaged in the manufacturing and marketing of steel products. It was established in 1970. In July 2019, BPSL was allegedly involved in fraud worth ₹3805.15 crore rupees (US$535.23 million), as detected by Punjab National Bank. It is one of India's most indebted companies and appears among the 12 companies referred by the Reserve Bank of India (RBI) to a bankruptcy court for the purpose of debt resolution.

== History ==
Bhushan Power & Steel was founded in 1970, incorporated in 1973 and registered with the Registrar of Companies in Delhi. The company established its facility in Chandigarh in 1973 to manufacture Tor steel and wire rod. It has 7 manufacturing facilities in India. The company was promoted by Sanjay Singal.

Bhushan Power & Steel was acquired by JSW Steel in September 2019. JSW Steel's offer of Rs. 19,700 crores was approved by NCLT.

The Enforcement Directorate (ED) had attached assets worth Rs 4,025 crore of BPSL in October 2019 regarding the ongoing probe. The National Company Law Appellate Tribunal (NCLAT) put a stay order, and the Ministry of Corporate Affairs stated in the proceedings that the ED did not have the jurisdiction to attach assets in an insolvency process. The ED is seeking a legal opinion to take the case before the Supreme Court against the order of NCLAT.

== Facility ==
The company has a 3.5 million tpa Integrated Steel and Power Plant in Sambalpur, Orissa comprising 4 DRI Kilns of 500 TPD, 100 MW Power Plant, Coal Washery, CSP Plant, Blast Furnace, Coke Oven Plant, Sinter Plant, Oxygen Plant, Steel Making and Lime & Dolomite Plant.

== Fraud cases ==
In April 2019, the Central Bureau of Investigation accused the company of taking a loan of ₹47,000 crore (US$5 billion) from various banks including Punjab National Bank (New Delhi and Chandigarh), Oriental Bank of Commerce (Kolkata), IDBI Bank (Kolkata) and UCO Bank (Kolkata), which later turned into non-profitable assets. The case is under investigation by the Central Bureau of Investigation.

More banks followed suit in revealing financial misdealing. On 6 July 2019, Bhushan Power and Steel Limited was accused of committing another fraud of ₹3805.15 crore rupees (US$535.23 million) from Punjab National Bank. On 13 July 2019, Allahabad Bank disclosed that it had detected a fraud of ₹1,774.82 crore (US$184 million) by BPSL. On 16 July 2019, Punjab & Sind Bank (PSB) reported a ₹238 crore (US$25 million) fraud by BPSL.

On 26 March 2021, JSW Steel announced that it had paid ₹19,350 crore (US$2.0 billion) to the financial creditors of Bhushan Power & Steel as part of a resolution plan for acquiring the company.
