= Welspun Living =

Indian Textile company based in Mumbai

Welspun Living Limited
- Formerly: Welspun India Limited
- Type: Public
- Traded as: NSE: WELSPUNLIV; BSE: 514162
- Industry: Textiles
- Founded: 1985
- Founder: Balkrishan Goenka
- Headquarters: India
- Key people: Dipali Goenka (CEO and Joint MD); Rajesh Mandawewala (MD)
- Revenue: ▲₹9,825 crore (US$1.0 billion) (FY24)
- Net income: ▲₹681 crore (US$71 million) (FY24)
- Parent: Welspun Group
- Subsidiaries: Welspun USA; Christy; Sorema
- Website: Official website

Welspun Living Limited, previously known as Welspun India Limited, is an Indian textile manufacturing company headquartered in Mumbai. Founded by Balkrishan Goenka in 1985, the company produces home textile products such as bed linen, terry towels, rugs, and yarn. Welspun operates several brands, including Christy, Spaces and Welhome, and is led by Dipali Goenka, who is the CEO and managing director.

== History ==
Founded in 1985 by Balkrishan Goenka as Welspun Winilon Silk Mills in Palghar, Maharashtra, Welspun India initially focused on polyester texturizing. In 1991, the company went public through an initial public offering (IPO) and subsequently changed its name to Welspun India Limited. Towel manufacturing and export operations began in 1993 with a new plant in Vapi, Gujarat. In 1998, Welspun secured its first outsourcing order of terry towels from Walmart. Subsequently, the company began exporting towels to additional American retail majors including JCPenney, Target, Kmart, Tommy Hilfiger, Calvin Klein, Shopko and Costco, as well as retailers in Europe, Australia and New Zealand. In 2004, a new facility in Anjar, Gujarat, was established for bed linen production, with a capacity of 35 million meters per annum. The Toweling facility started commercial production in March 2005, and the spinning facility commenced commercial production in June 2005.

In 2007, Welspun started a bedding sets facility in Mexico. In 2009, the company demerged its Sales & Marketing and Investment divisions into two separate entities – Welspun Global Brands Ltd. and Welspun Investments & Commercials Ltd. In 2014, Welspun launched a new spinning facility at Anjar, Gujarat. In 2017, Welspun entered the flooring and smart textiles sectors, expanding into in the Middle East, Japan, Australia, and the EU. On 9 February 2017, the company partnered with the Cotton Egypt Association (CEA) to promote Egyptian cotton products globally.

== Acquisitions and subsidiaries ==
In 2006, Welspun India acquired an 85% stake in CHT Holdings, the holding company of the UK's largest towel firm, Christy, for the equivalent of US$28.7 million. Christy's existing management retained a 15% stake in the company and continued to be involved in its operations. Following the acquisition, Rajesh Mandawewala, joint managing director of Welspun, was appointed chairman at Christy.

As part of a demerger move in September 2008, Welspun separated its Sales & Marketing and Investment divisions, creating two distinct entities—Welspun Global Brands Ltd. (WGBL) and Welspun Investments & Commercials Ltd (WICL). WGBL was specifically responsible for the sales and marketing division of Welspun's home textile business.

In 2012, WGBL was reintegrated into Welspun India Limited. However, the marketing business of Welspun India was separated and transferred to a third firm called Welspun Retail Ltd (WRL). In the same year, certain overseas investments of Welspun India Limited (WIL) were moved to WRL. Welspun Retail was later renamed Welspun Global Brands Ltd to maintain its marketing identity.

=== Welspun USA ===
Welspun USA Inc is a subsidiary of Welspun India Ltd. Welspun USA operates as one of the largest home textile divisions of the 3 billion dollar Welspun Group. Welspun USA has become a key supplier to 9 of the top 10 American retailers, manufacturing 1 in 5 towels in the US. Their product range includes Bath Towels, Bath Rugs, Accent & Area rugs, Down Alternative Comforters and Mattress Pads, and Fashion Bedding. With over 28 active patents, Welspun has garnered some attention for its HygroCotton technology, which has temperature regulating benefits and hollow core yarn to get softer with each wash. It was established in 2000, as a wholly owned subsidiary of Welspun Retail Ltd.

Key people include Dipali Goenka, Executive director, Julie McKenzie, President & CEO.

== Controversies ==
Target, a US-based retail corporation, terminated its contract with the company following a dispute over cotton supply. In a statement issued on August 19, 2016, Target Corporation noted that its vendor, Welspun Global Brands (Welspun), was one of the producers of 500-thread count sheets made from Egyptian Cotton under the Fieldcrest label for Target. Target raised concerns, alleging that Welspun had substituted another type of non-Egyptian cotton during the production of these sheets between August 2014 and July 2016 without Target's knowledge. In response, Target withdrew the affected products, offered customers full refunds, and severed ties with Welspun in August 2016. Walmart and Bed Bath & Beyond also discontinued selling the implicated linens later that year.

On August 20, 2016, Welspun India issued a statement confirming that it encountered a product specification issue with one client program of its subsidiary, Welspun Global Brands. Welspun India stated that it had initiated immediate actions to investigate the root cause of the issue and was appointing one of the Big Four external audit firms to audit its supply systems and processes. Welspun emphasized that this was an issue of the highest priority and would take all necessary steps to address it.
