= Dipali Goenka =

Indian businesswoman

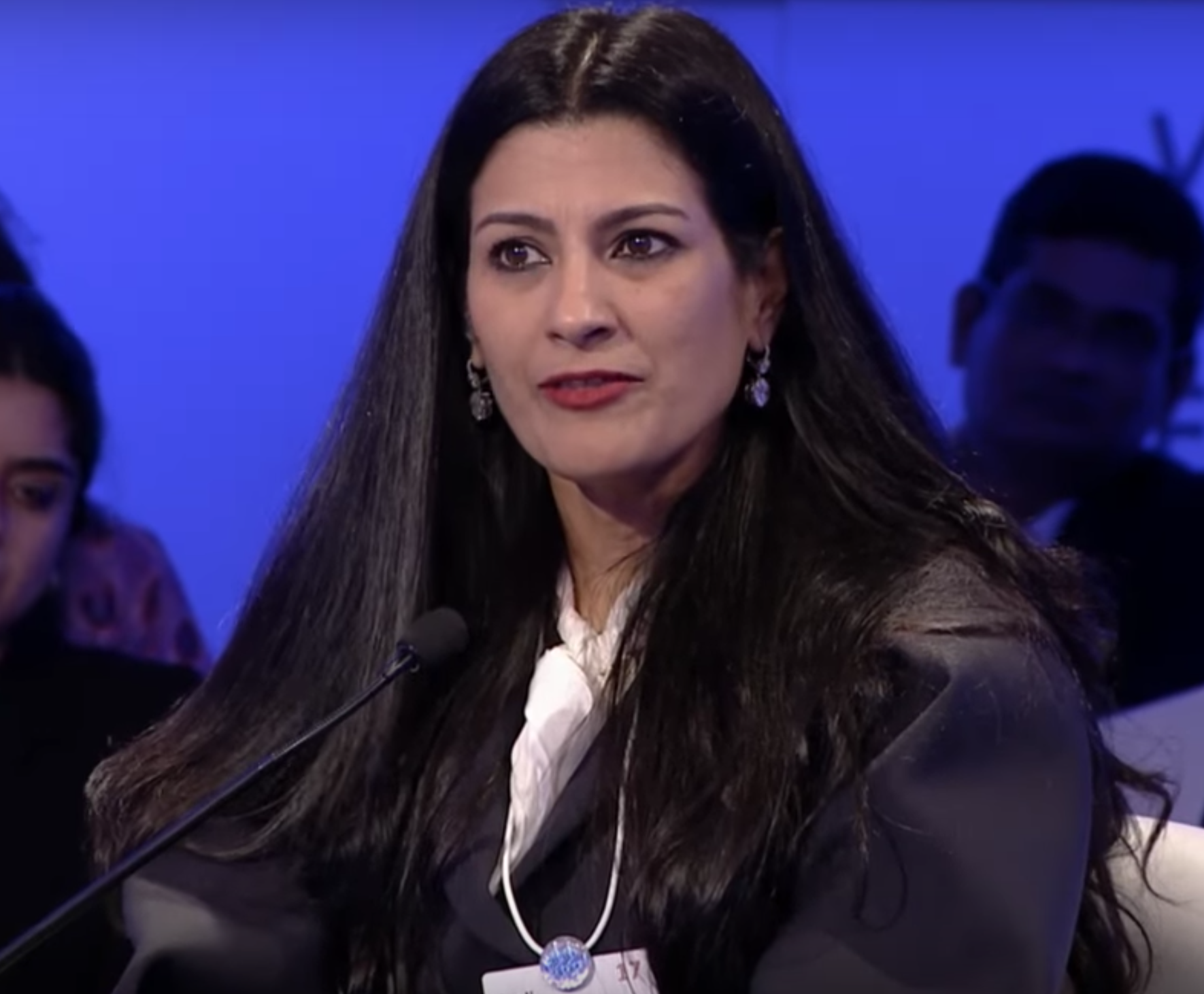
- Dipali Goenka in 2017
- Born: October 13, 1969 (age 57)
- Education: Harvard University
- Occupation: Businesswoman
- Title: CEO & MD, Welspun Living
- Spouse: Balkrishan Goenka
- Children: 2

Dipali Goenka (born 1969) is an Indian businesswoman, and the CEO and MD of Welspun Living, a textile company in Mumbai.

In 2016, Forbes ranked her as one of the 50 most powerful woman in Asia. In 2023, she was appointed an independent director of NDTV alongside former SEBI chairman UK Sinha. She was also invited to be part of NDTV World Summit in 2024.

== Early life and education ==
Goenka was born in Jaipur and studied at Maharani Gayatri Devi Girls' School. Due to family circumstances, she married at the age of 18 and moved to Mumbai in the late 1980s. She later completed her degree with a specialization in psychology.

== Career ==
In 2002, Goenka joined her husband's textile business, where she headed the design studio. Welspun was initially a textile exporter. Under her leadership, the company expanded into the domestic retail market with the brand Spaces. In 2004, she set up a textile manufacturing facility in Gujarat.

In 2005, Goenka attended the owner and president management program at Harvard Business School. In 2006, she acquired Christy, a UK-based towel manufacturer, for ₹100 crores. She became CEO of Welspun's global business in 2010 and joint managing director in 2014.

She has participated in international forums, including the Harvard India Conference in 2018 and the World Economic Forum in Davos in 2024, where she was a panelist at a session titled Investing in Parity - The Double X Factor. She is a brand ambassador for WEConnect International, chaired the ASSOCHAM Women's Council, and is a board member of the consumption platform at the World Economic Forum.

== Personal life ==
She married BK Goenka, co-founder and chairman of Welspun World, in 1987. The couple has two daughters, Radhika and Vanshika.

== Lawsuit ==
During her tenure at Welspun India, the company faced a major setback when the US retail corporation Target terminated all its contracts with Welspun due to a dispute over cotton supply. Target alleged that the bedsheets supplied by the company were falsely labeled as Egyptian cotton and that another type of non-Egyptian cotton was substituted during production between August 2014 and July 2016 without Target's knowledge. Subsequently, Walmart and Bed Bath & Beyond also ceased their partnerships with Welspun. This led to a 54% decline in Welspun India's market capitalization between August 19, 2016, and August 30, 2016.

== Recognition ==
- One of the Most Powerful Women in Business by Business Today in 2021
- Forbes named her one of the 50 most powerful woman in Asia in 2016
- CNBC Changemakers in 2024
