= Pramod Mittal =

Indian businessman

Personal details
- Born: 1 September 1956 (age 69) India
- Spouse: Sangeeta Mittal
- Children: Vartika, Shrishti & Divyesh
- Profession: Businessman

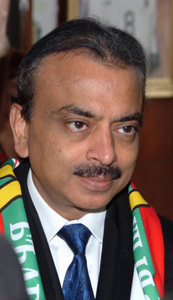
A portrait of Indian businessman Pramod Mittal

Pramod Mittal (born 1 September 1956) is an Indian businessman who was the chairman of Ispat Industries Limited (now JSW Ispat Steel).

== Life and career ==
He was married to Sangeeta Mittal. The Couple has three children; Vartika, Shrishti and Divyesh. His elder brother is Lakshmi Mittal who is also a Businessman. He spent $82 million on his daughter's wedding in Barcelona.

In March 2019, the Supreme Court in India dropped charges against him after he paid money owed to a public sector enterprise.

Lakshmi Mittal, the Indian steel magnate, chairman and CEO of ArcelorMittal, paid off his brother's debt in 2019. The total debt paid-off was 1600 crore INR, which was about 225 million US dollars in 2019 at a rate of 69 Indian Rupees to the US Dollar.

He is owner of Global Steel Philippines in Iligan which he acquired in 2004. Then President Gloria Macapagal Arroyo witnessed his acquisition of the Mill which was formerly known as the National Steel Corporation or NSC-which for many years was known as Asia's first and largest. President Arroyo's maternal roots are also from Iligan. In 2019, the cantonal court in Tuzla had ordered Mittal to also deposit nearly €11 million for alleged damages to GIKIL. He was declared bankrupt on 19 June 2020 in a London court.

In October 2021, Pramod Mittal was named in the Pandora Papers. In 2023 he was charged with "heading an organised crime group" that allegedly helped him syphon around €11 million (US$12 million) from Global Ispat Koksna Industrija Lukavac (GIKIL). He co-owned the plant near Tuzla in northeastern Bosnia with the local government. Various other charges include illegally taking control of the metallurgical coke producer despite failing to invest €23 million, or more than half the amount he committed to invest in 2003 in return for the 51 per cent stake in the company.
