= Devi Sahai Jindal =

Indian industrialist

Debi Sahai Jindal
- Devi Sahai Jindal
- Born: Nalwa, Hisar, Haryana, India
- Died: India
- Occupation: Industrialist
- Spouse: Ram Dei Devi
- Parents: Netramji Jindal (father); Chandrawali Devi (mother)
- Family: Jindal family
- Awards: Padma Shri
- Website: dsjindal.com

Devi Sahai Jindal was an Indian industrialist and the founder of the Jindal Group, a leading steel industrial group in India. Born in the village of Nalwa in Hisar district in Haryana to Netramji and Chandrawali Devi Jindal, Devi Sahai, along with his brother Bhavi Chand Jindal, founded a steel industrial company which grew over the years and is now split by business groups, DSJ Group, BCJ Group OPJ Group and DPJ Group. He was honoured by the Government of India in 1971 with Padma Shri, the fourth highest Indian civilian award.

== Business History ==
The Jindal Group ventured into business activities in 1952. The first setup was in Howrah, for the manufacturing of Mild Steel, ERW, and Black Galvanised steel pipes and tubes.
