= Sintex =

Indian plastic company

Sintex Industries Ltd
- Type: Public company
- Traded as: BSE: 502742; NSE: SINTEX
- Industry: Textile
- Founded: 1931; 95 years ago
- Headquarters: Kalol, Gujarat, India
- Key people: Rahul Patel (chairman and MD); Amit Patel (MD)
- Owner: Reliance Industries (2023–present)
- Subsidiaries: Bharat Vijay Mills (BVM); Sintex Yarns; BVM Overseas Ltd
- Website: sintex.in

Sintex BAPL Ltd.
- Welspun Sintex logo

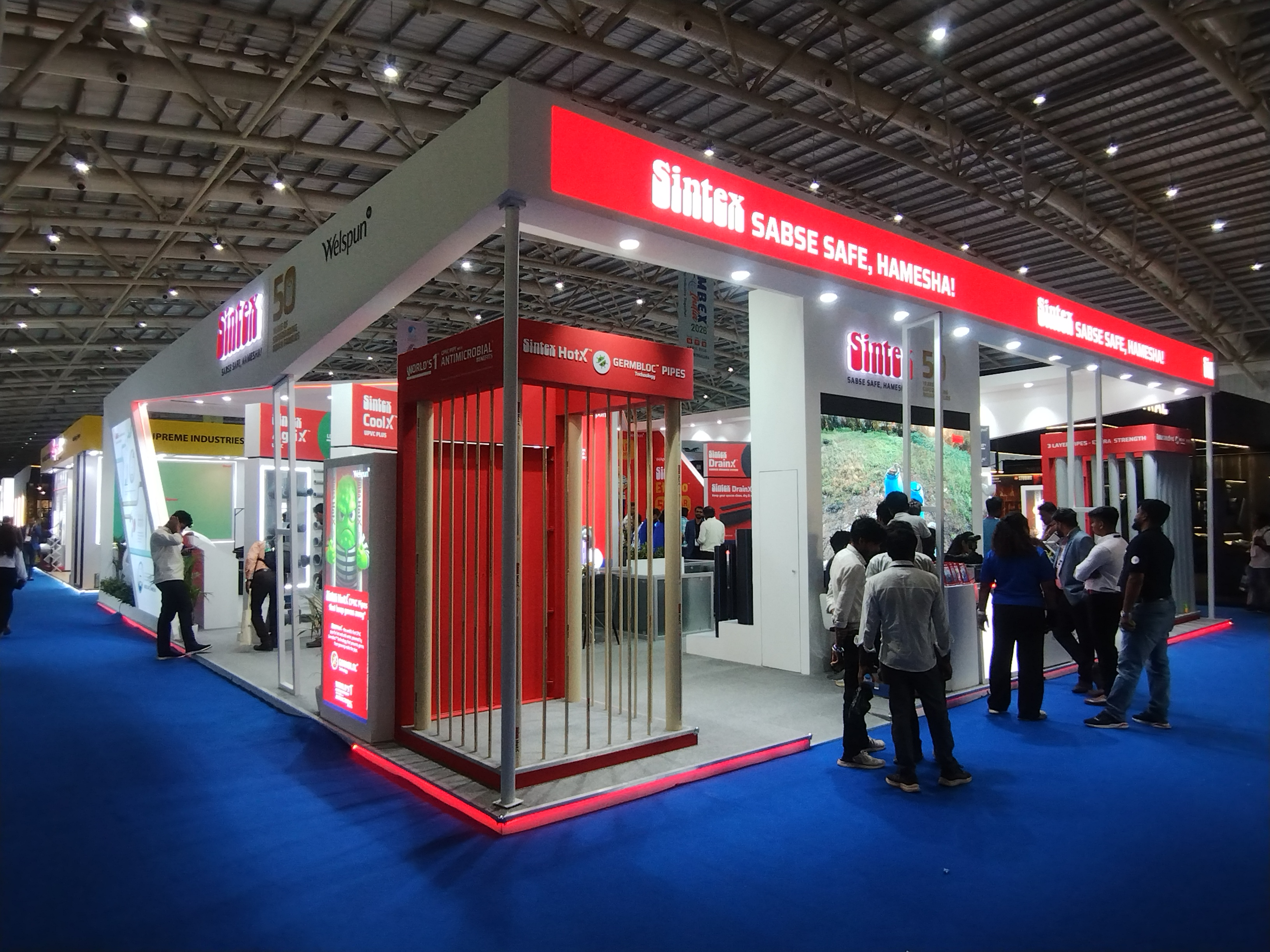
- Welspun Sintex at Plumbex India 2026, BIEC
- Type: Public company
- Traded as: BSE: 540653; NSE: SPTL
- Industry: Plastics
- Founded: 2017; 9 years ago
- Headquarters: Kalol, India
- Key people: Amit Patel (chairman and MD)
- Owner: Welspun Group (2023–present)
- Subsidiaries: Bright Autoplast (Sintex-BAPL)(India); Sintex Plastics (India); Wausaukee Composites Inc (US); Sintex Infra Projects
- Website: sintexplastics.com

Sintex (formerly known as The Bharat Vijay Mills Ltd and Sintex Industries Ltd) is the world's largest producer of plastic water tanks and Asia's largest manufacturer of corduroy fabrics.

The company operates in Europe, America, Africa, and Asia, especially in France, Germany, and the US. It primarily works with building materials, textiles, prefabricated structures, custom molding products, monolithic construction and water storage tanks.

In March 2023, it was announced that, in separate agreements, Sintex Industries Ltd. (SIL) and Sintex Plastics Technology Limited were acquired by Reliance Industries (RIL) and Welspun Group, respectively. After completing the purchase, RIL now holds 70% of SIL's share control and will manage the company jointly with Assets Care & Reconstruction Enterprise (ACRE).

== History ==
Bharat Vijay Mills Limited was incorporated in June 1931 and started a composite textile mill in Kalol, Gujarat that same year. In 1975 it was renamed Sintex Industries Limited and was listed on the Mumbai Stock Exchange in 2000.

Sintex expanded significantly in the 2000s, including the acquisition of U.S.-based Wausaukee Composites. In 2007 the offshore holdings segment, Sintex Holdings BV Netherlands, acquired the automotive branch of Bright Brothers Ltd to form Bright Autoplast, also called Sintex BAPL, and the French company Nief Plastics was acquired, to be later renamed Sintex NP. In 2015 Bright Autoplast signed onto a joint venture with Rototech Group to expand its coverage of automotive applications, calling the joint unit BAPL Rototech.

In 2017 Sintex demerged, with its textiles business remaining under the name Sintex Industries Limited, while the plastics and prefab side became Sintex Plastics Technology Limited.

=== Sintex Industries Limited ===
Despite strong initial showings after the demerger, in June 2019 Sintex Industries was downgraded by CARE Ratings to "issuer non-cooperating" and defaulted on non-convertible debentures from Punjab National Bank. Another default later that year precipitated a plea by Invesco Asset Management in December 2020 and Sintex Industries entered bankruptcy in April 2021.

=== Sintex Plastics Technology Limited ===
Sintex developed an anaerobic digester in 2008 that captures emissions from human waste for use as fuel or for generating electricity.

Sintex began a campaign called ReviveOurRivers in October 2017 encouraging people to make a pledge to keep rivers clean.

In August 2019, Sintex Plastics sold the entirety of subsidiary Sintex NP SAS to XTECH Invest. The French unit was known as Nief Plastic SA before Sintex acquired it in 2007.

In March 2021, Sintex Plastics reported a major fire at the Sanaswadi plant, part of the Sintex-BAPL material subsidiary.
