= Abhyuday Jindal =

Indian businessman

- Abhyuday during an interview
- Born: 4 April 1989 (age 37)
- Occupation: Business executive
- Title: Managing director of Jindal Stainless Limited
- Spouse: Srishti Jindal
- Parent(s): Ratan Jindal; Deepika Jindal

Abhyuday Jindal (born 4 April 1989) is an Indian businessman and the managing director of Jindal Stainless Limited (JSL), a stainless steel producer. He joined the Jindal Stainless group in 2014 and was appointed managing director of JSL in April 2018.

Jindal Stainless exited a corporate debt restructuring process in 2019 and completed the merger of its subsidiary Jindal Stainless (Hisar) Limited into the parent company in 2023. During Jindal's tenure, the company expanded its production capacity and range of specialised steel products, invested in raw-material sourcing operations, and introduced co-branding initiatives with downstream manufacturers. It also expanded into long steel products and materials for defence, aerospace and renewable energy applications.

Jindal has held positions in industry organisations. He served as president of the Indian Chamber of Commerce from October 2024 to October 2025 and has spoken publicly on stainless steel imports, trade policy, industrial standards and energy supply.

== Early life and education ==
Jindal is the son of Ratan Jindal, chairman of Jindal Stainless, and Deepika Jindal, who founded the stainless steel homeware brand Arttd'inox. He is a grandson of Om Prakash Jindal.

He graduated from Boston University in economics and business management. Before university, he spent about a year at a Jindal Stainless plant, participating in the induction of new employees; he had initially intended to study mechanical engineering.

== Career ==
Jindal began his career at the JSW Group, where he worked on its acquisition of a stake in Ispat Industries and the subsequent integration of the two businesses. He then worked as a consultant at Boston Consulting Group on assignments in the cement, steel, wind turbine and automotive component industries.

=== Jindal Stainless ===
Jindal joined the Jindal Stainless group in 2014. He became non-executive vice-chairman of Jindal Stainless (Hisar) Limited (JSHL) in November 2015 and joined the board of JSL in August 2017. He was appointed managing director of JSL in April 2018 and also served as managing director of JSHL. He was reappointed at JSL for a five-year term from May 2023.

JSL, which had entered corporate debt restructuring in 2009, announced its exit from the framework in March 2020, with effect from 31 March 2019. In December 2020, the boards of JSL and JSHL approved a merger of the two companies, which took effect in March 2023.

His early work at the group included changes to inventory management and delivery scheduling: made-to-order production was retained, while buffer stocks were introduced for selected orders. He also set a target of limiting the company's exposure to any single industry or geographical market to about 15–20 per cent. In 2026, he said the company had shifted raw-material procurement from the United States and Europe towards India, Southeast Asia and the Middle East.

Jindal was involved in introducing Jindal Saathi, a co-branding programme for stainless steel pipes and tubes. Launched in July 2019, it used seals identifying the supplier, Jindal Stainless and the steel grade to distinguish participating suppliers' products from counterfeits, and was expanded in 2020. In 2021, he said that he oversaw day-to-day operations, including production, marketing and process improvement, while his father handled finance and strategic decisions.

=== Defence and energy ===
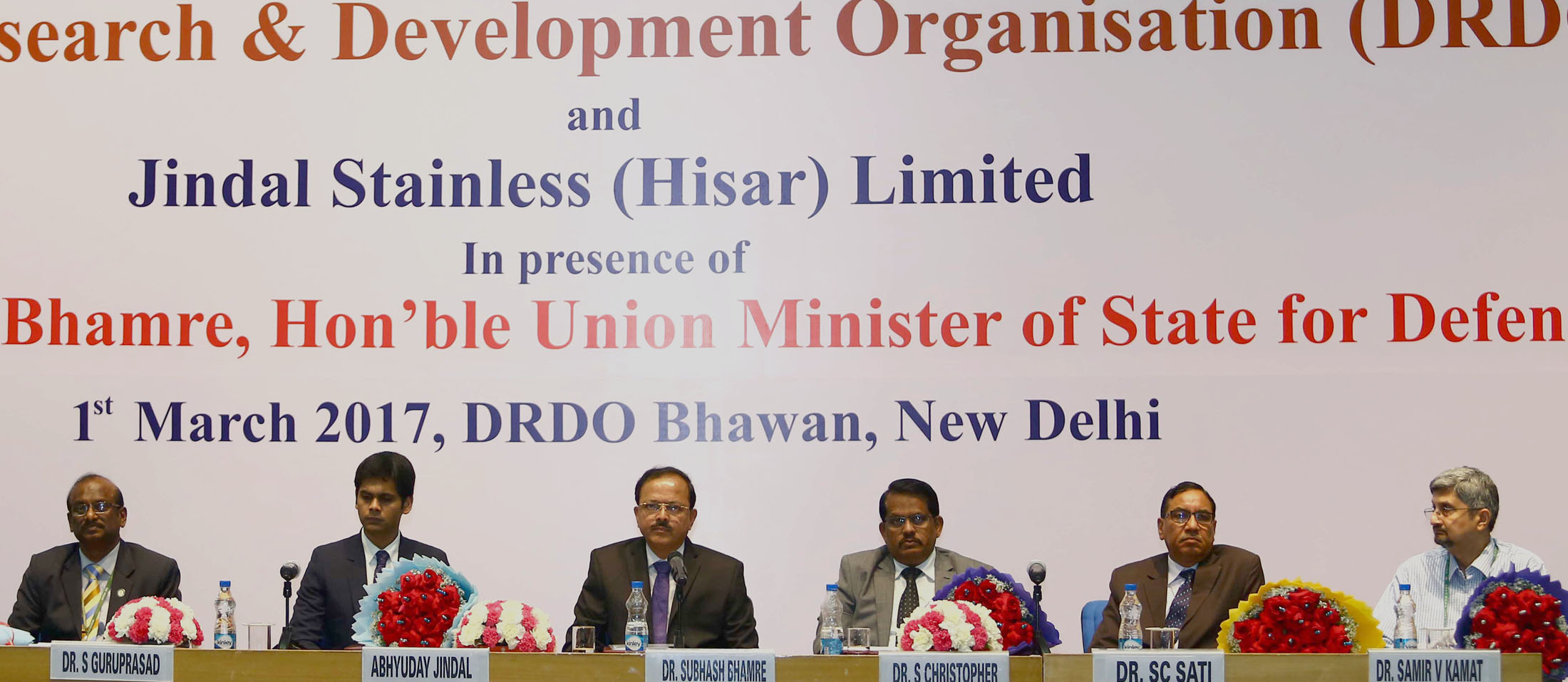
Jindal (second from left) at the signing of a technology licensing agreement between the Defence Metallurgical Research Laboratory and Jindal Stainless (Hisar) in March 2017

In March 2017, as vice-chairman of JSHL, Jindal represented the company at the signing of a technology licensing agreement with the Defence Metallurgical Research Laboratory of the Defence Research and Development Organisation for high-nitrogen steel used in armour. In September 2025, he said the company planned to produce special steels for defence, aerospace and nuclear applications, starting with electroslag remelting. He also called for faster decision-making and greater emphasis on technology in defence procurement, and criticised the lowest-price bidding model, saying it could compromise quality, while stating that testing standards should not be diluted.

In October 2025, Jindal said the company would invest ₹700–800 crore in renewable electricity and green hydrogen, through power purchase agreements and captive projects, partly in response to the European Union's Carbon Border Adjustment Mechanism. He described India's reliance on fossil-fuel electricity as a constraint on reducing emissions.

== Industry organisations ==
Jindal became president of the Indian Chamber of Commerce in October 2024. He has also served as co-chair of the steel committee of the Federation of Indian Chambers of Commerce & Industry, co-chair of the advisory council of the corrosion management division of the Confederation of Indian Industry, and vice-president of the Infrastructure Industry and Logistics Federation of India.

== Views ==
Jindal has called for greater protection of Indian stainless steel producers from imports. Ahead of the 2024 Union budget, he sought the removal of duties on some raw materials and higher customs duties on imported stainless steel. In February 2025, he proposed an import duty of 20–25 per cent, saying that steel shut out of the United States and other markets could be diverted to India. In December 2025, he said exemptions from mandatory Quality Control Order requirements were holding back investment by domestic manufacturers.

In July 2025, while president of the chamber, he called for a separate national policy and taxonomy for stainless steel; in November 2025, he proposed that such a policy address nickel supply, chromium exploration, mining royalties, skills training and corrosion prevention. In July 2026, he said that tighter import restrictions in the United Kingdom, the European Union, the United States and other markets meant companies would need to focus on markets with more certain long-term demand.

== Recognition ==
Jindal was included in the Economic Times 40 Under Forty list in 2024 and the Fortune India 40 Under 40 list in 2026. In the BT-PwC India's Best CEOs programme, he received the award in the mid-sized companies category in 2024 and in the Urban Visionary category in 2025.
