= Jindal Stainless =

Indian multinational stainless steel company

Jindal Stainless Limited
- Type: Public
- Traded as: BSE: 532508; NSE: JSL
- ISIN: INE220G01021
- Industry: Stainless steel
- Founded: 1970
- Founder: Om Prakash Jindal
- Headquarters: New Delhi, India
- Key people: Ratan Jindal (Chairman); Abhyuday Jindal (Managing Director); Tarun Kumar Khulbe (Chief Executive Officer)
- Products: Stainless-steel slabs, coils, plates, blooms, sheets, wire rods, rebars, blade steel, precision strips and coin blanks
- Revenue: ₹42,955 crore (US$4.5 billion) (FY2025–26)
- Website: www.jindalstainless.com

Jindal Stainless Limited (JSL) is an Indian stainless steel manufacturer with its headquarters in New Delhi. It is part of the O. P. Jindal Group. The company was established as Jindal Strips Limited by Om Prakash Jindal at Hisar, Haryana, in 1970, and Jindal Stainless Limited was formed through a restructuring in 2002. Its principal production sites are at Hisar in Haryana, Jajpur in Odisha and Mundra in Gujarat, and it has manufacturing and processing interests in Indonesia and Spain.

The business was divided in 2015 as part of a debt restructuring. Its separately listed Hisar business merged with Jindal Stainless in 2023. As of March 2026, the company reported annual melting capacity of 4.2 million tonnes, including a joint-venture plant in Indonesia.

JSL's Jindal Quanta at 9th Bengaluru Space Expo 2026, BIEC

== History ==
=== Origins and formation (1970–2002) ===
Om Prakash Jindal established Jindal Strips Limited at Hisar in 1970. The plant initially produced hot-rolled carbon-steel coils, plates, slabs and blooms. It began producing stainless steel in 1978 using argon oxygen decarburisation.

Jindal Strips established a cold-rolling plant at Vasind, Maharashtra, in 1983; the unit later became part of JSW Steel. The company made an initial public offering in 1986 and introduced low-nickel 200-series stainless steel in 1988, during a nickel shortage. Production of stainless-steel strip for razor and surgical blades began in 1991, followed by precision strip later in the decade.

In 1996, the company expanded melting capacity at Hisar and amalgamated Jindal Ferro Alloys Limited, creating a ferro-alloys division at Visakhapatnam. It began producing coin blanks at Hisar in 2000 and opened a cold-rolling plant in Ohio, United States, which closed a few years later during a market downturn.

Jindal Strips was restructured in 2002, with manufacturing operations transferred to Jindal Stainless Limited. Around this period, the company acquired chromite mining interests at Kaliapani in Odisha.

=== Odisha plant and restructuring (2003–2015) ===
In 2003, Jindal Stainless began developing an integrated stainless-steel complex at Kalinganagar in Jajpur district, Odisha. It acquired a cold-rolling plant in Indonesia in 2004 and opened the Iberjindal service centre in Spain in 2007. The Jajpur plant was commissioned in 2011.

In January 2014, the Odisha State Pollution Control Board reported violations of environmental regulations at the Jajpur plant, citing the discharge of untreated industrial effluent. The board warned of possible closure if corrective measures were not implemented.

The company's debt was restructured under the corporate debt restructuring (CDR) framework. In 2015, with long-term debt of about ₹8,500 crore, it reorganised its business under a court-approved scheme of arrangement. The Hisar plant and the ferro-alloys and mining assets were transferred to the separately listed Jindal Stainless (Hisar) Limited, while the Odisha hot strip plant and coke oven plant were transferred to Jindal United Steel and Jindal Coke.

=== Merger and acquisitions (2016–2023) ===
Jindal Stainless exited the CDR framework with effect from 31 March 2019. In December 2020, the boards of Jindal Stainless and Jindal Stainless (Hisar) approved a merger of the two companies. Following approvals from shareholders, creditors and the National Company Law Tribunal, the merger took effect in 2023. The record date was 9 March 2023.

The company's acquisitions during this period included Rathi Super Steel through the insolvency resolution process and the remaining interest in Jindal United Steel. It also agreed with New Yaking Pte. Ltd. to take a 49 per cent stake in a nickel-pig-iron smelter in Indonesia.

=== Expansion (2024–2026) ===
In 2024, Jindal Stainless announced plans for a melt shop in Indonesia with annual capacity of 1.2 million tonnes, additional downstream capacity at Jajpur, and the acquisition of a majority stake in Chromeni Steels, which operated a cold-rolling mill at Mundra, Gujarat. In September 2025, it signed a memorandum of understanding with the Government of Maharashtra for a proposed plant at Raigad with annual capacity of 4 million tonnes, to be built in phases. The Indonesian melt shop was commissioned in March 2026.

== Operations ==
Jindal Stainless manufactures stainless-steel slabs, coils, plates, blooms, sheets, wire rods, rebars, blade steel, precision strips and coin blanks. As of March 2026, the company reported annual melting capacity of 3 million tonnes in India and 1.2 million tonnes at its joint-venture plant in Indonesia. It reported consolidated revenue of about ₹42,955 crore for the financial year ended March 2026.

The Hisar plant produces razor-blade-grade stainless steel and supplies coin blanks to Indian and overseas mints. According to the head of the company's Special Products Division at Hisar, the division holds about 60–70 per cent of the global market for razor-blade-grade stainless steel.

In 2017, Jindal Stainless (Hisar) signed a licensing agreement with the Defence Research and Development Organisation to manufacture high-nitrogen steel developed by the Defence Metallurgical Research Laboratory for armour and other defence applications. In 2014, the company was selected to supply stainless steel for the cryostat of the ITER fusion project in France. It has supplied stainless steel for railway and metro coaches, including the Vande Bharat sleeper coaches and the Esplanade–Howrah Maidan section of the Kolkata Metro, which runs beneath the Hooghly River. It also supplied an alloy steel grade used in the motor casing of the Chandrayaan-3 lunar mission.

In 2019, the company introduced Jindal Saathi, a co-branding programme with pipe and tube manufacturers intended to address counterfeiting of its products.

The company has agreements with educational institutions for research and employee training. These include a 2025 memorandum of understanding with Gati Shakti Vishwavidyalaya in Vadodara on stainless-steel applications in transportation and logistics, a sponsored M.Tech programme in steel technology at IIT Bombay, and 2026 agreements with XLRI Jamshedpur and IIM Bangalore for employee development.

== Energy supply and emissions ==
In 2022, Jindal Stainless agreed with ReNew Power on a project of approximately 300 MW of wind and solar power to supply its Jajpur operations. A green hydrogen unit at Hisar, developed with Hygenco to supply hydrogen for annealing, was inaugurated in March 2024 and operates off-grid. The company commissioned a captive solar installation of more than 30 MWp at Jajpur in April 2025. In March 2026, it began receiving power from the Madhya Pradesh portion of a 315.6 MW hybrid wind and solar project developed by Oyster Renewable Energy across Madhya Pradesh and Gujarat. The company has stated a target of net-zero emissions by 2050.
