= Sangita Jindal =

Indian businesswoman (born 1962)

- Sangita Jindal
- Born: 30 August 1962 (age 64); Calcutta, West Bengal, India
- Education: St. Xavier's College, Ahmedabad
- Occupation: Philanthropist
- Organisation: JSW Foundation
- Spouse: Sajjan Jindal (m. 1984)
- Children: 3, including Parth Jindal

Sangita Jindal (born 30 August 1962) is an Indian businesswoman, art curator and the chairperson of the JSW Foundation, the corporate social responsibility arm of the JSW Group.

== Early and education ==
Jindal was born on 30 August 1962 in Calcutta (present-day Kolkata), West Bengal, India, to industrialist Kailash Kumar Kanoria and his wife Urmila Kanoria. She grew up in a business-oriented family and has one sibling, a brother named Saket Kanoria. She attended St. Xavier's College in Ahmedabad, where she completed her undergraduate studies.

== Career ==
=== JSW Foundation ===
Since the 1990s, Jindal has led the JSW Foundation, overseeing its social development programs in communities around JSW Group’s operational areas.

==== Rural BPO Initiative for Women’s Empowerment ====
Jindal oversaw the establishment of women-only business process outsourcing centres in rural Karnataka and Maharashtra to create employment opportunities for women. Since its launch, the initiative has set up eight centres, training over 3,000 women in data entry and customer service. Jindal also serves as chair of the UN Women’s Empowerment Principles Initiative in India.

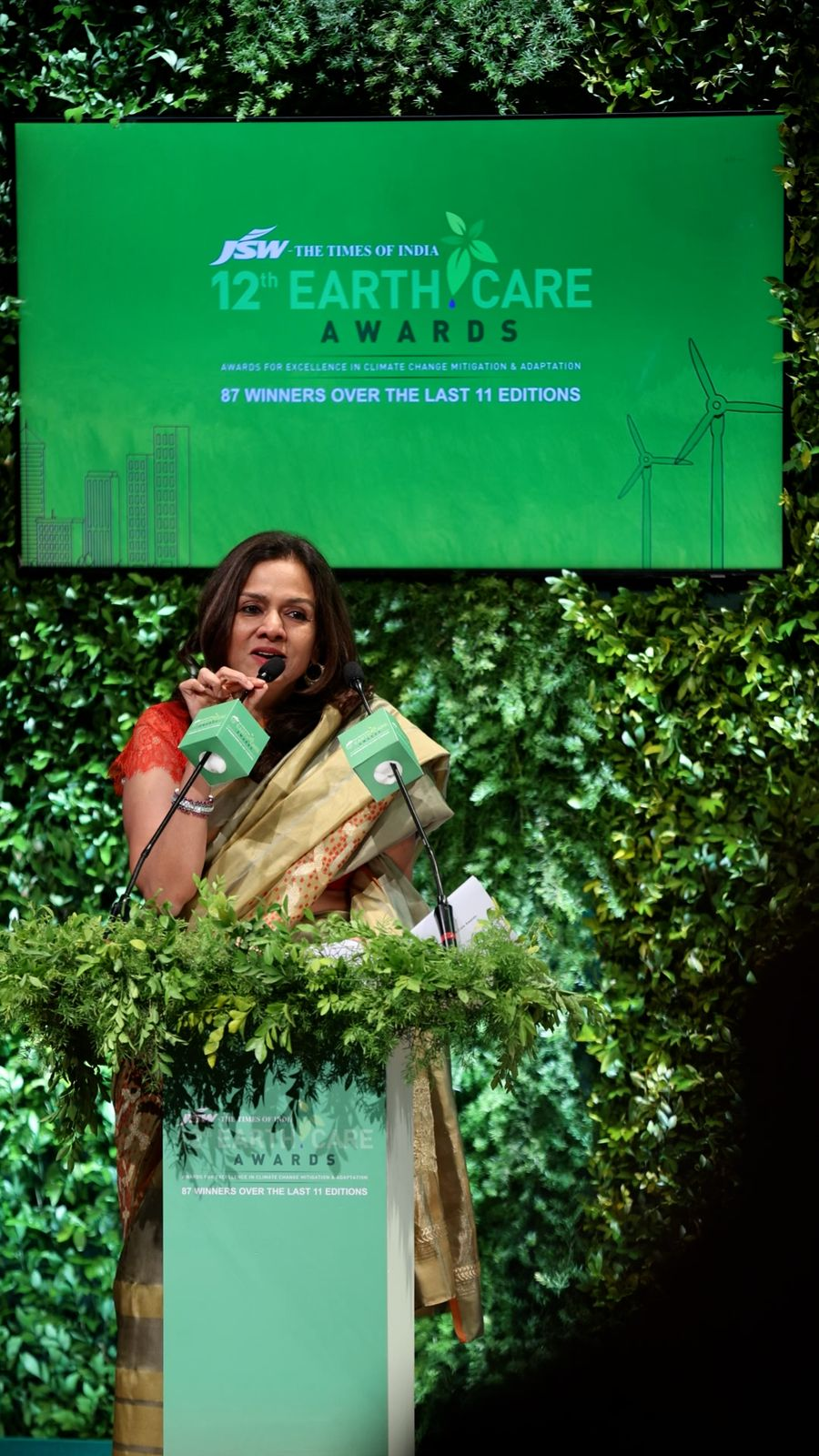
Sangita Jindal speaking at the 12th Earth Care Awards 2025, Tata Theatre, National Centre for the Performing Arts (India)

==== Heritage conservation and restoration ====
Jindal has overseen heritage conservation initiatives through the Hampi Foundation, which has carried out restoration work at three temples in Hampi, a UNESCO World Heritage Site. She led the restoration of sites, including the Knesset Eliyahoo Synagogue and the David Sassoon Library in Mumbai. Additional projects include refurbishing the interiors of the Sir J. J. School of Art.

==== Art and Culture Initiatives ====
In 1992, Sangita Jindal founded the Jindal Arts Centre at the National Centre for the Performing Arts in Mumbai as a space for interdisciplinary arts. She launched Art India magazine in 1996, focusing on contemporary Indian art and critical writing. Jindal was also involved in the conceptualisation of the Kala Ghoda Arts Festival in Mumbai.

=== Other professional roles ===
Jindal holds positions in various cultural and social organizations' such as serving as a Global Trustee of the Asia Society, a member of the National Culture Fund, and a trustee of the World Monuments Fund. In 2024, she became the chair of the Asia Society India Centre, where she promotes cultural exchange and dialogue. Jindal also advises TEDxGateway and is a member of the IMC Ladies’ Wing Art, Culture, and Film Committee.

== Personal life ==
Jindal is married to Sajjan Jindal and has three children. Her son, Parth Jindal, currently serves as the Managing Director of JSW Cement. She also has two daughters; Tarini Jindal Handa, who is involved in the luxury and lifestyle business at JSW Realty, and Tanvi Jindal Shete, who runs the Museum of Solutions.

== Curated exhibitions ==
- Right Foot First at Hampi Art Labs, February 2024.
- The Red Dress Project at Hampi Art Labs, November 2024.
- Blue Futures: Reimagining Indigo at Hampi Art Labs, November 2025-February 2026 (with Meera Curam).
- Homo Faber Biennale 2026 with Alberto Cavalli of Michelangelo Foundation for Creativity and Craftsmanship.

== Awards and recognition ==
- 2004 Eisenhower Fellowship.
- 2011 Women Philanthropist Award by Federation of Indian Chambers of Commerce & Industry.
- 2025 Chevalier de l’Ordre des Arts et des Lettres.
