= Sajjan Jindal =

Indian billionaire businessman (born 1959)

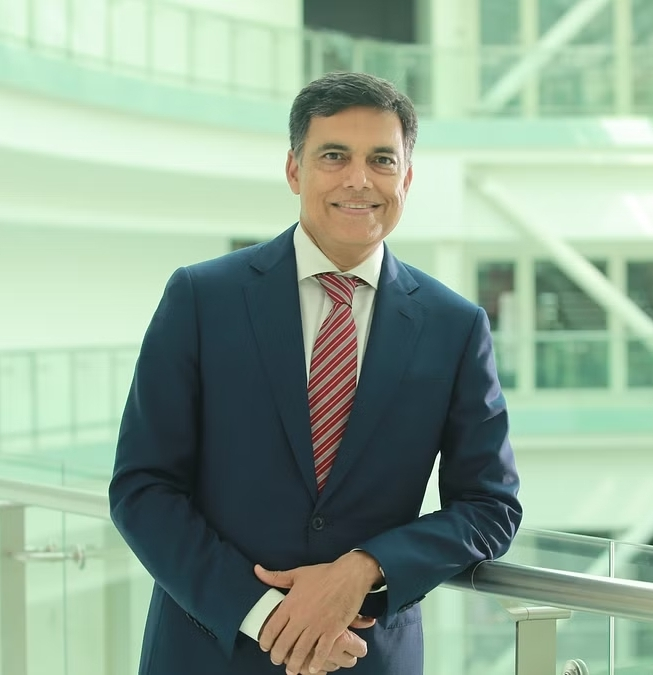
- Sajjan Jindal circa 2016
- Born: 5 December 1959 (age 66); India
- Education: Ramaiah Institute of Technology
- Occupations: Chairman and Managing Director of JSW Group
- Spouse: Sangita Jindal
- Children: 3, including Parth Jindal
- Parent(s): Om Prakash Jindal; Savitri Jindal
- Relatives: Naveen Jindal (brother)
- Family: Jindal family
- Website: jsw.in

Sajjan Jindal (born 5 December 1959) is an Indian billionaire businessman. He is the chairman and managing director of JSW Group.

For 2021–22, he was the chairman of World Steel Association. He was replaced by POSCO's Jeong-Woo Choi.

== Early life and education ==
He is one of the sons of Indian businessman and parliamentarian, Om Prakash Jindal. His youngest brother, Naveen, is a Member of Parliament of India from the Bharatiya Janata Party and also leading Jindal Steel and Power.

Sajjan Jindal holds a bachelor's degree in mechanical engineering from the Ramaiah Institute of Technology, Bangalore. According to Forbes, Jindal family led by Savitri Jindal is worth US$40.7 billion, as of 2026.

== Career ==
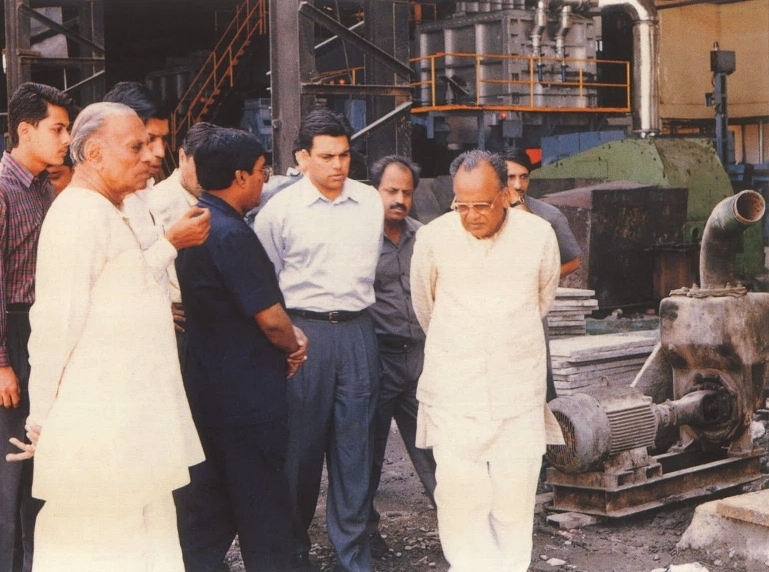
OP Jindal with Sajjan Jindal at JSW Steel, Torangallu village in Vijaynagar, Karnataka in 2000

In 1982, he joined the OP Jindal Group as a freshly graduated mechanical engineer from Bengaluru, and within a year he moved to Mumbai to look after the western region operations. In 1983–1984, Jindal's father, Om Prakash Jindal put him to the test by ordering him to turn around operations at two facilities near Mumbai.

He promoted Jindal Iron and Steel Company Limited (JISCO), for manufacturing of Cold Rolled and Galvanized Sheet Products in 1989. He promoted Jindal Vijaynagar Steel Limited (JVSL), JSW Energy Limited (JSWEL), Jindal Praxair Oxygen Limited. (JPOCL) and Vijaynagar Minerals Private Limited. (VMPL) to ensure complete integration of the manufacturing progress in 1995. In 2005, his steel companies, JISCO, and JVSL, were merged to form JSW Steel, and a holding group of the same name.

Even before the death of OP Jindal in a helicopter accident in 2005, the group's patriarch established a "division of business" framework. First, he gave Prithviraj, Sajjan, Ratan, and Naveen Jindal equal shares of the existing OP Jindal Group he had built up over the years. Then, Jindal Senior ensured that each of his sons had a cross-holding in the businesses that the brothers were owning individually.

In December 2023, Sajjan Jindal was accused of rape. A subsequent police investigation concluded that the allegation was unfounded, stating that the complainant had attempted to frame him with malicious intent, and the case was closed.

=== Board memberships and affiliations ===
In 2008, Jindal became the president of ASSOCHAM. He is a member of the Advisory Committee for TERI School of Advanced Studies, a council member for the Indian Institute of Metals and Krea University; and also a board member for the Indian Institute of Management Indore. In 2023, Jindal was nominated as the chairperson of the Board of Governors of Indian Institute of Technology Tirupati.

== Advocacy ==
=== Industrialization of India ===
Jindal has advocated for strengthening India's manufacturing sector through self-reliance, domestic supply chains, and industrial modernisation, particularly in steel. In 2020, he urged Indian industries to leverage global supply chain shifts and position India as a manufacturing alternative to China. He emphasised the role of government support, infrastructure investment, and affordable credit in enhancing competitiveness. But, he also accepts that industries in India lacks sufficient interests in research and development due to quarterly performance pressures that prevent companies from generating enough profits to invest meaningfully in it. At the 2025 centenary of the Indian Chamber of Commerce, he called on domestic industries to scale up and meet global standards.

=== Electric vehicles ===
Jindal has expressed support for the indigenisation of electric vehicle technology in India. Through the JSW Group's joint venture with SAIC Motor—JSW MG Motor India—he has outlined plans to increase the availability of EVs for Indian consumers by localising production and reducing reliance on imported technology. The initiative includes setting up domestic R&D and design centres and coordinating with other JSW Group companies such as JSW Steel to produce EVs suited to Indian market conditions. Jindal has described this shift as a significant opportunity for the auto sector and has stated that Indian companies should play a larger role in its development.

=== Tariffs on Chinese Imports ===
Jindal has a critical view on steel imports, from state-subsidised Chinese companies. He warned that without such measures, India could become a dumping ground, harming local manufacturers. In 2023, he urged retaliatory tariffs in response to US and European trade actions and criticised Chinese steel's entry via FTA countries like Vietnam. In 2024, he highlighted China's steel exports matching India's production capacity and called for safeguard duties. His efforts contributed to a 12% provisional safeguard duty on steel imports in 2025. He also supports tariffs in other sectors like petrochemicals, textiles, and furniture.

== Awards and recognition ==
- June 2009, Willy Korf/Ken Iverson Steel Vision Award for his contribution to the steel industry.
- 2014 "National Metallurgist Award: Industry" instituted by the Ministry of Steel, Government of India.
- IIM-JRD Tata Award 2017 for Excellence in Corporate Leadership in Metallurgical industry.
- 2018 CEO of the Year award by Business Standard.
- Best CEO award 2019 by Business Today Magazine.
- Ernst & Young Entrepreneur of the Year Award 2022.
- Fortune India's Class of Best CEOs of India, 2024.
- Business Leader of the Decade' award at the 15th AIMA Managing India Awards.
- 2025 Economic Times Awards Business Leader of the Year.

== Personal life ==
Jindal is married to Sangita Jindal, who is Chairperson of JSW Foundation. Together, the couple has two daughters, Tarini and Tanvi, and a son, Parth.
