= ASSOCHAM =

Trade association in India

Associated Chambers of Commerce and Industry of India
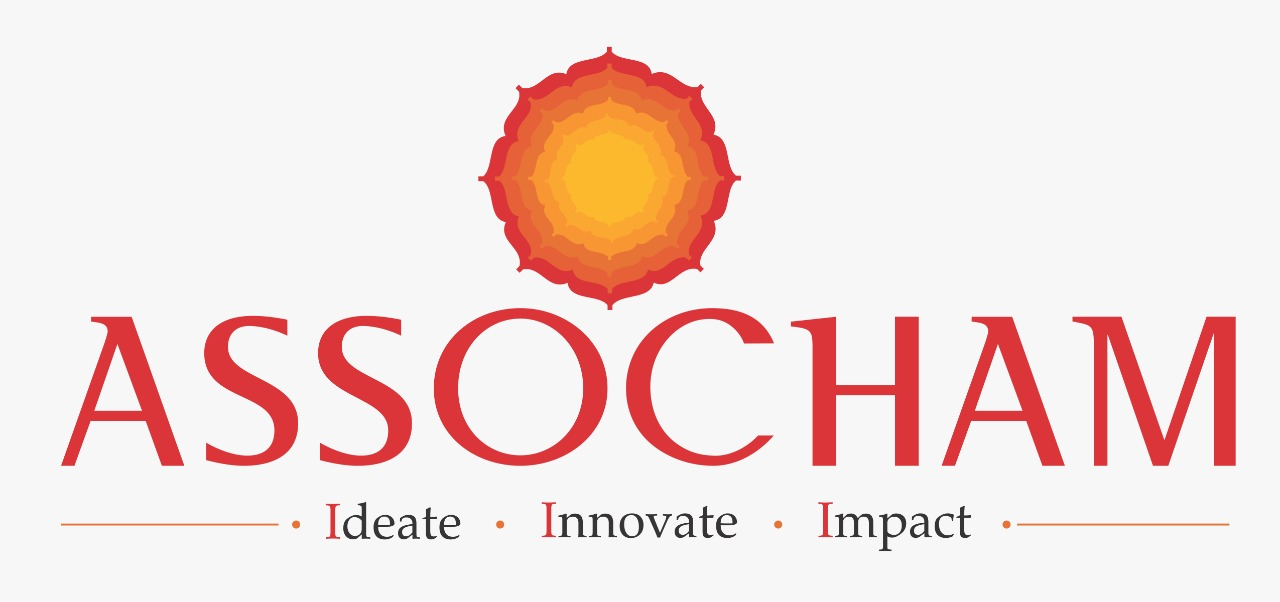
- Formation: 1920; 106 years ago
- Type: Non-governmental trade association
- Purpose: Policy advocacy
- Headquarters: New Delhi, India
- Members: over 450,000 companies
- Secretary General: Saurabh Sanyal
- President: Nirmal Kumar Minda
- Website: www.assocham.org

The Associated Chambers of Commerce and Industry of India (ASSOCHAM) is a non-governmental trade association and advocacy group based in New Delhi, India. The organisation represents the interests of trade and commerce in India, and acts as an interface between issues and initiatives. The goal of this organisation is to promote both domestic and international trade, and reduce trade barriers while fostering conducive environment for the growth of trade and industry of India.

== Background ==
ASSOCHAM was established in 1920 by a group of chambers of commerce led by the Calcutta Traders Association. The Association's head office is located in New Delhi and regional offices are located in the cities of Ahmedabad, Bengaluru, Ranchi, Jammu, Chandigarh, Kolkata, Mumbai, Lucknow, Hyderabad, Jaipur and Bhubaneswar.

ASSOCHAM members leads initiatives in various segments such as empowerment, healthcare, education and skilling, hygiene, affirmative action, road safety, livelihood, life skills, and sustainability.

The association has appointed Vineet Agar, the managing director of Transport Corporation of India, as its new president to replace Niranjan Hiranandani in 2021.

In 2021 the association held a virtual summit by the name of Xelerate North, where the Himachal Pradesh Industries Minister Bikram Singh and others were invited to discuss industry issues.

In 2023, Rakesh Nangia, Founder and Managing Partner of Nangia & Co LLP and Chairman of Nangia Andersen India has been appointed as Chairman, International Tax Council of Assocham.

== Committees ==
ASSOCHAM operates with more than 100 national and regional sector councils. It is a representative of the Indian industry. These Councils are led by well-known industry leaders, academics, economists and independent professionals. The Chamber works on aligning critical needs and interests of the industry with the growth aspirations of the nation. It also interacts with international counterpart organisations to promote bilateral economic issues.
