= Agroha =

Agroha may refer to:

- Agroha (town), a town in Hisar district of Haryana, India
- Agroha Dham, a temple complex dedicated to Agrasena in Agroha
- Agroha Mound, an archaeological site located in Hisar district of Haryana, India
