= Satlok Ashram =

Religious organisation

- Formation: 1 June 1999 (27 years ago)
- Founder: Sant Rampal
- Type: Socio-spiritual organization
- Legal status: Foundation
- Headquarters: Barwala, Hisar, Haryana, India
- Region served: Worldwide
- Official language: English, Sanskrit, Bengali, Hindi
- Website: satlokashram.org

Satlok Ashram is an organisation founded by Bhakti Mukti Trust on June 1, 1999, in Karontha village of Rohtak, Haryana. The first spiritual program took place from 1 June to 7 June 1999.

== History ==
In 1994, Swami Ramdevanand (a Hindu saint from Garib Das Panth) selected Sant Rampal Das Ji as his successor. Sant Rampal Das Ji started delivering discourses and giving initiation to the devotees

Earlier Sant Rampal Das Ji used to impart Satsang by going to the house of the devotees. As the number of devotees increased there arose a need to establish an ashram. Satlok Ashram, Karontha was, hence, established by Bandi Chhod Bhakti Mukti Trust in 1999.

=== Karontha incident 2006 ===
In 2006, Sant Rampal Das Ji raised objections to certain parts of Satyarth Prakash, the central text of the Arya Samaj religious sect. He termed these parts as "impractical and anti-social". This angered the followers of Arya Samaj, who surrounded his ashram, eventually resulting in a clash between the followers of two sects on 12 July 2006. During the clash, one person was shot dead and 59 more were injured. Sant Rampal Das Ji was charged with murder and attempted murder, and jailed for 21 months. His followers claim that he was falsely implicated in the case and demanded a CBI investigation. Sant Rampal Das Ji was forced to vacate the Karontha ashram. He was convicted of murder in this case relating to the death of a woman supporter.

=== Barwala incident 2014 ===
In 2014, the Punjab and Haryana High Court issued non-bailable arrest warrants against him after his followers were accused of disrupting court's proceedings. Police went to detain him on 12 November 2014.

By 18 November, his Satlok ashram in Hisar was protected by thousands of his followers who were holding flags reading 'Satsaheb'. More than 20,000 security personnel and police forced their way into the ashram, but they could not find Sant Rampal Das Ji for arrest. The police used earth movers to break wall on the rear side of ashram to find him but were opposed by a large number of followers who allegedly injured some police personnel in an effort to halt their entry. The bodies of five women and 18-month-old child were found in his ashram.

Sant Rampal Das Ji was arrested on the night of 19 November 2014, along with more than 900 of his followers, on charges including sedition, murder, attempt to murder, conspiracy, hoarding illegal weapons and aiding and abetting suicide-mongers. Rampal was acquitted of the charges of wrongful confinement in court on 29 August. On 11 October 2018, Sant Rampal Das Ji was found guilty of murder in two cases with FIR no. 429 and 430 relating to the 2014 incident. Both cases pertain to the death of five women and an eighteen-month-old infant at his Satlok Ashram in Barwala, Hisar district.

== See also ==
- 9
