= Rampal (spiritual leader) =

Indian religious leader

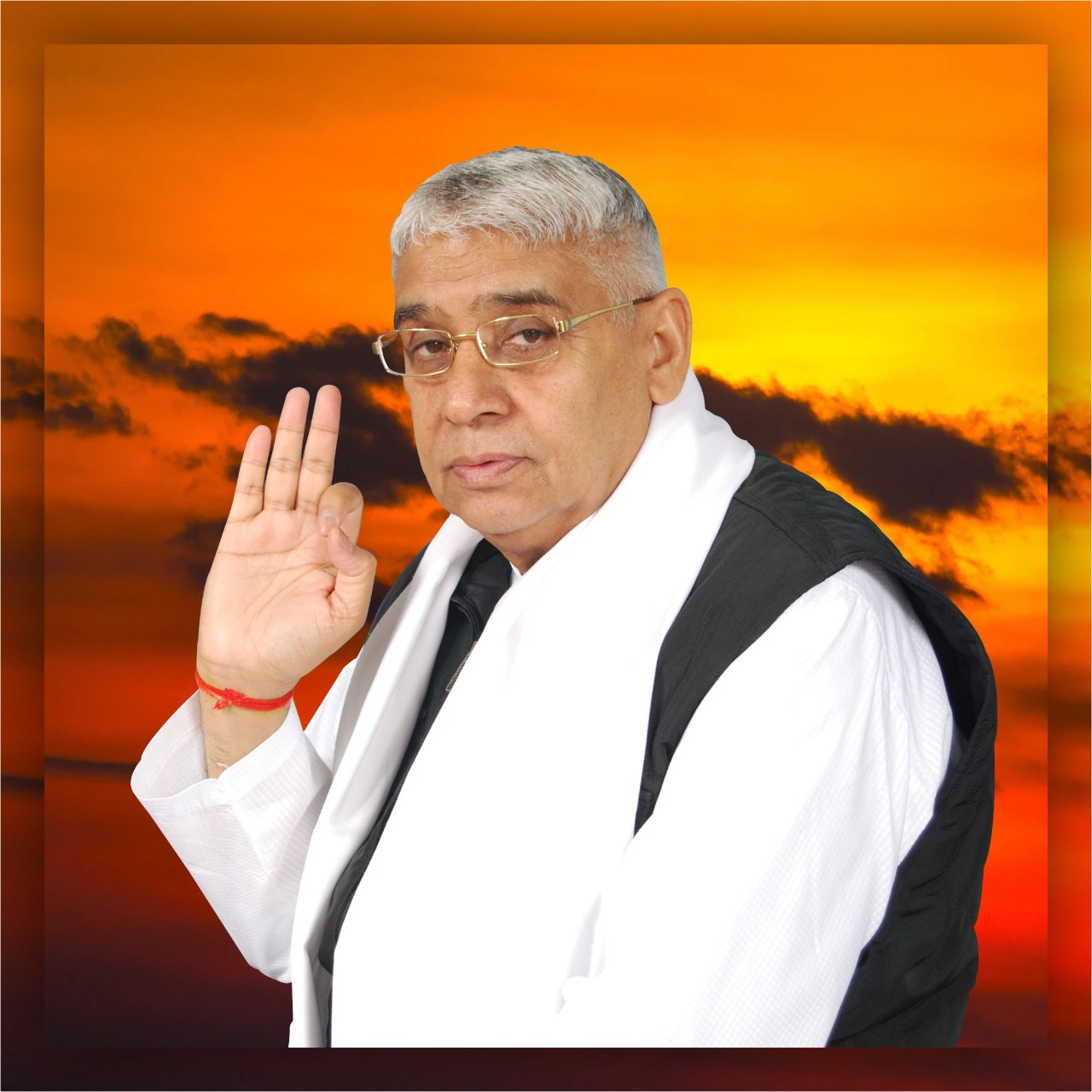
- Born: Rampal Singh Jatin; 8 September 1951 (age 75); Dhanana village, Punjab (now Sonipat, Haryana), India
- Other name: Rampal Dass
- Occupation: Spiritual leader
- Organization: Satlok Ashram
- Predecessor: Swami Ramdevanand

Details
- Country: India
- State: Haryana
- Date apprehended: 19 November 2014
- Imprisoned at: Hisar Central Jail-2; Out on bail since 9 April 2026

Rampal (born Rampal Singh Jatin on 8 September 1951) is an Indian self-styled Godman and convicted murderer.

He is a disciple of Ramdevanand, a local seer, and saint from the Garib Das Panth sect. In 1994, Ramdevanand selected him as his successor. In 1999, he and his followers established Satlok Ashram in Rohtak, Haryana and would go on to start several other ashrams in Jhajjar and Rohtak.

In 2006, Rampal publicly objected to certain parts of Satyarth Prakash, a central book of Arya Samaj. In July 2006, a violent confrontation between the followers of Arya Samaj and the supporters of Rampal took place at the Satlok Ashram, leading to the death of an Arya Samaj follower. Rampal was accused of triggering the confrontation and charged and arrested for murder. After 21 months in jail, he was released on bail in 2008.

However, in 2014, authorities again ordered his arrest on contempt charges after Rampal repeatedly failed to appear in court. Police then attempted to storm the Satlok Ashram, where they violently clashed with Rampal's followers, trying to prevent his arrest. The standoff between the police and his followers would injure multiple people, including those from media crews, and six people were killed during the week-long siege. Afterwards, Rampal was arrested and taken to Chandigarh to be tried. He was acquitted of charges on 20 December 2022.

Rampal was charged with wrongful confinement, murder, sedition, among other charges. In 2018, he and 26 of his followers were found guilty of murder (among other offences) and were sentenced to life imprisonment for the six deaths during the 2014 standoff. In August 2025, his life sentence was suspended.

== Early life ==
Rampal was born in Dhanana, a village in the Gohana tehsil of Sonipat district. His father Bhakt Nandlal was a farmer, and his mother Indro Devi was a housewife. He obtained a diploma in civil engineering from the Industrial Training Institute in Nilokheri, Karnal, and then worked as a junior engineer for 18 years in the Government of Haryana's Irrigation department.

Rampal is married to Anaro Devi, and they have two sons and two daughters; the family lived in the Barwala Ashram until the siege.

== Initiation into Kabir panth ==
According to his official biography, Rampal was an ardent devotee of the Hindu deities Hanuman, Krishna and Khatushyam from a young age. He states that he never achieved salvation, well-being, or peace as a result of this devotion. One day, he met Ramdevanand, a spiritual leader of the Garib Das panth, which is part of the wider Kabir panth. Ramdevanand told him that he could not attain salvation through the prevalent religious practices, which were a "false web" spread by the Hindu trinity of Brahma, Vishnu and Mahesh, along with their parents Brahm ("Kaal Niranjan") and Durga ("Ashtangi Aadi Maya").

Rampal states that he then studied several spiritual books, including Bhagavad Gita, Kabir Sagar, Sad Granth Saheb by Garib Das, and "all the Puranas". He claims to have found evidence supporting the statements of Ramdevanand in these books. He took initiation from him on 17 February 1988. He claims that he, then, started an intense jaap, after which he started experiencing "mental peace and extreme happiness".

In Rampal's biography he writes that in 1993, Ramdevanand asked him to start delivering sermons and in 1994, Ramdevanand chose him as his successor. He gained local popularity by touring various villages and cities in Haryana and became so busy that he resigned from his job as a junior engineer in May 1995.

== Legal issues ==
In 2006, Rampal raised objections to certain parts of Satyarth Prakash, the central text of the Arya Samaj religious sect, referring to them as "impractical and anti-social." This angered the followers of Arya Samaj, who surrounded his ashram, eventually resulting in a clash between the followers of two sects on 12 July 2006. During the clash, one person was shot dead and 59 more were injured. Rampal was charged with murder and attempted murder, and was jailed for 21 months. His followers claim that he was falsely implicated in the case and demanded a CBI investigation. Rampal was forced to vacate the Karontha Ashram.

A complaint of forgery was filed against him a day after the 2006 clashes. According to this complaint, the sale of land for his Karontha Ashram was fabricated using impersonation. Rampal's followers claim that they had no role in this impersonation, and the person who sold the land was at fault. On 1 May 2018, the court acquitted Rampal and his followers Rajender and Ravinder Dhaka in this case; three complainants were found guilty of forgery and fraud.

After Rampal was released on bail in 2008, he set up his base in Barwala, Hisar. In 2009, the High Court returned the Karontha Ashram to him. An appeal against the judgement was filed by the Haryana Government and Arya Pratinidhi Sabha, but was rejected by the apex court in February 2013.

After obtaining bail, Rampal did not appear in court regularly for his trial in the murder case. His followers were inside the Karontha Ashram when Arya Samaj-affiliated villagers, in an attempt to attack the ashram, clashed with the police protecting the ashram in May 2013, which resulted in death of 3 people, including a policeman. In addition, around 100 people were injured. Unable to check the villagers, the police forced Rampal followers to leave the Karontha Ashram, and move to Barwala Ashram. Arya Samaj activists demanded his arrest and trial. On 14 May 2014, he appeared in the Hisar court via video call. On this occasion, his followers entered the court premises and created chaos.

In July 2014, some Arya Samaji lawyers clashed with Rampal's followers that again disrupted the court proceedings. In September 2014, Rampal was asked to appear before the Punjab and Haryana High Court in Chandigarh, in a contempt of court case. The local administration imposed Section 144 and deployed 2,000 police personnel to prevent his followers from entering the city. Despite this, thousands of followers gathered in the city, although Rampal did not appear before the court.

During 2010–14, Rampal avoided appearing in court hearings 42 times. In 2014, the Punjab and Haryana High Court issued non-bailable arrest warrants against him after his followers were alleged of disrupting court's proceedings. When the police tried to detain him on 9 November, his followers formed human chains outside the Satlok Ashram to prevent the police from arresting him. The police tried to initiate a dialogue, and asked him to surrender. Rampal's followers announced that the police will have to kill more than 100,000 followers before arresting him.

By 18 November, his Satlok Ashram in Hisar was protected by thousands of his followers who wielded lathis and flags reading "SatSaheb," the word used for God. The Ashram was also protected by thousands of women devotees who blocked the entrance for several days, which prevented the police from entering it. More than 20,000 security personnel and police forced their way into the ashram, but they could not find Rampal for arrest. The police used earth movers to break wall on rear side of Ashram to find him, but were opposed by large number of followers who injured 28 police personnel in an effort to halt their entry. A large number of media personnel was also hit by the police. The bodies of five women and an 18-month-old child were found in his ashram.

Rampal was arrested on the night of 19 November 2014, along with more than 900 of his followers, on charges including sedition, murder, attempt to murder, conspiracy, hoarding illegal weapons, wrongful confinement, and aiding and abetting suicide-mongers. His followers demanded CBI investigation of the whole incident.

FIR No. 428 of 2014 (Barwala Police Station, Hisar), registered under Sections 121, 121A, 122, 124A of the Indian Penal Code (sedition and waging war against the State), the Arms Act, Explosive Substances Act, and the Unlawful Activities (Prevention) Act (UAPA), is still pending. The trial is ongoing. In April 2026, the Punjab and Haryana High Court granted Rampal regular bail in the case after more than eleven years in custody.

On 29 August 2017, Rampal was found not guilty and acquitted in two cases related to wrongful confinement and obstruction of duty by Hisar court; he remained in judicial custody as the cases of murder and sedition were still ongoing.

On 26 July 2021, a Hisar court acquitted Rampal and four followers in a case under the Drugs and Cosmetics Act due to lack of evidence, but on 30 October 2021, Rampal was jailed for 3 years under section 420 of the Indian Penal Code and the Essential Commodities Act. This seven-year-old case involves a seizure of 408 LPG cylinders and 2,600 liters of diesel in Satlok Ashram in Barwala town. He was acquitted on charges of cheating.

On 20 December 2022, he was acquitted in the 2006 firing case.

=== Murder conviction ===
On 11 October 2018, Rampal was found guilty of murder in two cases with FIR no. 429 and 430. Both cases pertain to the death of five women and an eighteen-month-old infant at his Satlok Ashram in Barwala in 2014 during clashes between his supporters and police. On 16 October 2018, all the accused were sentenced to life imprisonment along with a ₹2 Lakh fine each. The then Additional District and Sessions Judge D.R. Chalia pronounced the punishment for Rampal and fourteen of his followers of life imprisonment and also a fine of ₹1 lakh each was imposed separately for murder and criminal conspiracy. They were also sentenced to two years imprisonment and fined ₹5,000 each for wrongful confinement. The jail terms were to run concurrently.

In August 2025, the Punjab and Haryana High Court suspended his life sentence, citing "debatable medical evidence, his age, and the lack of support from the deceased's family."

== Claims and beliefs ==
Rampal and his followers claim that he is an incarnation of Kabir, a 15th-century Indian mystical poet, who is also considered to be the supreme God. He claims that all the major religious scriptures — including the Vedas, Gita, Quran, Bible and Guru Granth Sahib — name Kabir as the supreme god. Rampal claims to be the initiator of the thirteenth Kabir Panth, which he claims will transform earth into heaven and bring the golden era with his knowledge and worship. He also claims that after coming into contact with him, thousands had their chronic illnesses cured and families regained their fortunes. He takes guarantee to salvage his disciples to Satlok and ending all their sufferings if they followed all the rules of worship laid down by him.

Rampal preaches against temple visits, dowry, idol worship, unnecessary donations, untouchability, adultery, and "vulgar singing and dancing." He is strictly against the consumption of meat, tobacco, and alcohol as he says that it incurs great sin and causes immense suffering in next lives.

On Rampal's website, those who are hostile to him and his followers along with those who turned away from him are labeled as "traitors." The website claims that those who approach a traitor of the guru "will go to hell" in this and future lives.
