= Maharaja Agrasen Medical College, Agroha =

Medical college in Haryana, India

Coordinates: 29.336733°N 75.622477°E

Maharaja Agrasen Medical College
- Type: Private
- Established: 18 April 1988
- Founders: Om Prakash Jindal, Ghanshyam Das Goyal
- Academic affiliations: Pandit Bhagwat Dayal Sharma University of Health Sciences
- President: Savitri Jindal
- Director: Dr. Karandeep
- Undergraduates: 100 per year
- Postgraduates: 22 per year
- Location: Agroha, Hisar, Haryana, India
- Nickname: MAMC (pronounced as "ma'am-see")
- Website: Official website

The Maharaja Agrasen Medical College, Agroha (MAMC), a medical college affiliated to Pandit Bhagwat Dayal Sharma University of Health Sciences and recognized by National Medical Commission, is located on NH-9 at Agroha city of Haryana state of India. It is located near Agroha Dham and Agroha Mound.

== Background ==
=== Etymology ===
Maharaja Agrasen Medical College at Agroha is named after the legendary Indian king of ancient Agroha, Maharaj Agrasen.

=== History ===
The college was founded by Shree Om Prakash Jindal while his wife Savitri Jindal is the current president of the society that governs the institute. This non-profit medical college and hospital are run by a non-profit society, Maharaja Agrasen Medical Education & Scientific Research Society. The Society was established at Agroha on 18 April 1988 to provide health care services, medical education and research facilities to more than 2 crore population living in Haryana and adjoining states of Rajasthan, Punjab and Himachal Pradesh and to fulfil the socialist ideals of Maharaja Agrasen Ji. Om Prakash Jindal was the founding president of the society, proceeded by Naveen Jindal and current president Savitri Jindal.

== Administration ==
=== Members ===
In the governing body elections held on 19 February 2021, the following were elected.

- President: Savitri Jindal
- SR Vice President: Pawan Garg
- Vice President: Jagdish Jindal
- General Secretary: Jagdish Mittal
- Joint Secretary: R. C. Gupta
- Treasurer: Manmohal Goel

=== Executive members ===
In the governing body elections held on 19 February 2021, the following were elected.

- Madan Lal Bansal
- Navneet Goyal
- Preetam Parkash Aggarwal
- R. P. Jindal
- Ramesh Aggarwal
- Romi Garg
- Satyanand Arya
- Saurabh Ajay Gupta
- Sital Kumar Agarwal
- Vivek Mittal

== Facilities ==
The college with a 270-acre campus has the infrastructure required for the postgraduate and tertiary care, staff and student accommodation.

=== Hospital ===
The college has a 550-bed teaching hospital, including a trauma centre, and a 30-bed intensive care unit (ICU) accredited for 14 different specialized PG streams.

=== Accommodation ===
- Staff accommodation
  - Teachers' quarters (type-II houses) – 24 units for faculty members
  - Interns and residents' hostel – 100 rooms for doctors pursuing MS/MD/DNB and those completing the mandatory one-year internship
  - Nursing staff hostel – 120 rooms for the nursing personnel who are part of the hospital staff
- Students' hostel – accommodation for total 590 UG, PG, Interns students across various hostel blocks. Hostel facilities generally include the basic furnishings such as the bed, table, chair, almirah with common or attached washrooms, and mess facilities, 24-hour security and medical support.
  - MBBS girls' hostel – double-sharing (sometimes triple for GNM), 42 rooms in a separate block
  - MBBS boys' hostel – double/triple-sharing with single rooms for seniors and PG, four blocks
  - Interns & residents' hostel – double-sharing, often with attached bath, 100 rooms

== Colleges ==
=== Existing colleges ===
- Maharaja Agrasen Medical College (MAMC): for MBBS, MD, and MS degrees.
- Vidya Devi Jindal Paramedical College (VDJPC): for courses like B.Sc. Nursing, GNM Diploma, Bachelor of Physiotherapy (BPT), and various B.Sc. Paramedical Technology courses (MLT, OTT, etc).

=== Proposed colleges ===
- Dental college: The Maharaja Agrasen Medical College Agroha does not have a separate dental college that offers the BDS (Bachelor of Dental Surgery) or MDS (Master of Dental Surgery) degrees, but it has a department of dentistry. However, there are demands for such a college.
- Pharmacy college: The Maharaja Agrasen Medical College Agroha does not have a pharmacy college, nor does it offer courses in Pharmacy, such as B.Pharm or D.Pharm. However, there are demands for such a college.

== Departments ==
There are 20 departments classified into three categories – clinical, paraclinical, and pre-clinical.

=== Clinical departments ===
Clinical departments (hospital-based) are:

- Anaesthesiology
- General Medicine
- Dentistry
- General Surgery
- Obstetrics & Gynaecology (OBG)
- Ophthalmology (Eye)
- Orthopaedics
- Otorhinolaryngology (ENT)
- Paediatrics
- PsychiatryDermatology
- Radiology/Radio-Diagnosis
- TB & Chest Diseases (Pulmonary Medicine)
- Venereology & Leprosy (Skin & VD)

=== Paraclinical departments ===
- Community Medicine/PSM (Preventive & Social Medicine)
- Forensic Medicine & Toxicology
- Microbiology
- Pathology
- Pharmacology

=== Pre-clinical departments ===
- Anatomy
- Bio-Chemistry
- Physiology

== Faculty ==
As of 2013, the college had more than 90 teaching staff covering 20 different departments, namely Dentistry, Radiology, Obst. & Gynae, Anaesthesia, ENT, Ophthalmology, Orthopedics, General Surgery, General Medicine, Frensic Medicine, Psychiatry, Skin & VD, TB & Chest, Paediatrics, Microbiology, Pathology, Pharmacology, Biochemistry, Anatomy and Physiology, 82 Nursing & 168 non-teaching staff, and additional contractor and outsourced staff.

== Courses offered ==
The college offers MBBS, GNM (General Nursing & Midwifery), B.Sc (Nursing), BPT (Bachelor of Physiotherapy) and PG (post Graduate) courses.

As of 2025, the college does not offer DM (Doctor of Medicine) or M.Ch. (Magister Chirurgiae) superspeciality courses.

=== Admissions ===
The medical college entrance examination for MAMC is through National Eligibility cum Entrance Test (Undergraduate) on basis of merit list prepared by Pt. B. D. Sharma U. H. S. Rohtak. College also has 22 seats for the PG (Post Graduate) courses, admission for which are through National Eligibility cum Entrance Test (Postgraduate).

The college has academic facilities (lecture room, demo rooms, common rooms, labs, library, skill lab, computer lab), hospital, residential facilities (staff quarters, hostel, cafeteria, hostel mess), indoor & outdoor recreation facilities and medical facilities for students and staff.

=== Undergraduate courses ===
==== Medical ====
- MBBS (Bachelor of Medicine, Bachelor of Surgery), 100 seats based on NEET UG score in 5.5 years course including 4.5. academic coursework (theory & clinicals) and 1 year mandatory rotating residential internship

==== Nursing ====
- B.Sc. Nursing, 50 seats in 4 years course based on university common Entrance Exam conducted by Pt. B.D. Sharma University
- Nursing GNM (General Nursing and Midwifery) Diploma, 50 seats in 3.5 years course including mandatory 6 months internship

==== Paramedical ====
- BPT (Bachelor of Physiotherapy), 40 seats in 4.5 years degree including 6 months of mandatory internship.
- B.Sc. Medical Laboratory Technology (MLT), 20 seats in 3 years course.
- B.Sc. Operation Theatre Technology (OTT), 10 seats in 3 years course.
- B.Sc. Radiography, 10 seats in 3 years course.
- B.Sc. Optometry & Ophthalmic Techniques, 10 seats in 3 years course.

=== Postgraduate courses ===
Total 52 MD/MS 3-year degree seats with admission based on NEET PG score and 14 to 28 seats per year in Diplomate of National Board (DNB) based on NBEMS score.

==== Medical ====
- MS
  - MS General Medicine, 10 seats
  - MS Anaesthesiology, 9 seats
- MD
  - MD Orthopaedics, 7 seats
  - MS Ophthalmology, 37 seats

==== Paraclinical ====
- MD Pathology, 3 seats
- MD Bio-Chemistry, 3 seats
- MD Forensic Medicine & Toxicology, 3 seats
- MD Microbiology, 2 seats
- MD Community Medicine (SPM), 2 seats
- MD Pharmacology, 2 seats

==== Pre-clinical ====
- MD/MS
  - MD Anatomy, 2 seats
  - MD/MS Physiology, 2 seats
- Diplomate of National Board (DNB) 3 year program (an equivalent postgraduate qualification) in several specialties with intaking varying from year to year with seats released by the NBEMS (National Board of Examinations in Medical Sciences) prior to each counseling session (January/July admission cycles).
  - DNB General Medicine, 2 to 4 seats
  - DNB Radio-Diagnosis, 2 to 4 seats
  - DNB Paediatrics, 2 to 4 seats
  - DNB Obstetrics & Gynaecology, 2 to 4 seats
  - DNB Psychiatry, 2 to 4 seats
  - DNB Tuberculosis and Chest Diseases, 2 to 4 seats
  - DNB Otorhinolaryngology (ENT), 2 to 4 seats

=== Proposed courses ===
Due to high case load in the region there is big demand for the following.

==== Medical ====
- DM in Cardiology, Neurosurgery, Nephrology, and Gastroenterology
- MS/M.Ch. in Cardiology, Neurosurgery, Plastic and Reconstructive Surgery, Surgical Gastroenterology, and Urology
- MD courses in currently unrepresented clinical specialties with high volume, such as General Medicine, Radiology/Radio-Diagnosis, and Obstetrics & Gynaecology
- DNB Expansion: Adding DNB seats in more specialties, particularly those that are popular, like DNB General Medicine or DNB Radio-Diagnosis, to utilize existing hospital infrastructure fully

==== Paramedical ====
There are demands to include these courses under the existing VDJPC paramedical college.

- B.Sc. and M.Sc Audiometry and B.Sc. BASLP (Audiology and Speech-Language Pathology)
- B.Sc. and M.Sc in Dietetics & Nutrition: Required for specialized patient care e.g., in cardiology, nephrology, diabetes clinics
- B.Sc. ETT (Emergency & Trauma Technology): Dedicated course to support the expansion of trauma care facilities
- B.Sc. RT(Respiratory Therapy): Increasing need for specialists in pulmonary and critical care medicine

== See also ==
- List of medical colleges in Haryana: The following MBBS colleges, which are not included in the national Wikipedia list, ensure that each of 22 districts of Haryana has at least one medical college.

State Counselling Board (SCB) in Haryana, often overseen by the Directorate of Medical Education & Research (DMER) or Shri Krishna AYUSH University (SKAU), manages the online/offline process for allocating seats in medical (MBBS, BDS, PG) and AYUSH courses, handling state quota admissions for government/private colleges based on NEET scores (or entrance exams like JEE/NATA for tech/Arch), ensuring fair, merit-based distribution for students qualified for Haryana's 85% state quota seats, and conducting rounds of choice filling and seat allotment.

  - Baba Sarsai Nath Medical College, Sirsa 100 MBBS seat, 500 bed medical college costing ₹1,010 crore on 21 acres of land for which foundation stone was laid by the Chief MInister Saini in November 2024. MBBS admissions from 2027-28 session.
  - Sant Shiromani Shri Guru Ravidas Government Medical College, Fatehabad at Rasulpur village of Fatehabad district on Ratia-Tohana Road is under construction MBBS admissions from 2026-27 session.
  - Pandit Neki Ram Sharma Government Medical College, Bhiwani, GMC Bhiwani, 100 MBBS seat, 640 bed medical college became operational in 2025 with admission to MBBS seats.
  - Government Medical College, Charkhi Dadri at Ghasola village MBBS admissions from 2027-28 session.
  - Maharishi Chyavan Government Medical College, Narnaul at Koriavas village, with 100 MBBS seats, 810 beds, 76 acre campus costing 500 crore, started MBBS admissions from 2025-26 session.
  - Government Medical College, Panchkula at Panchkula sector-32 with 100 MBBS seats and 30.2 acre campus costing Rs 650 crore started admissions from 2024.
  - Shri Guru Teg Bahadur Government Medical College, Yamunanagar at Panjupur village with 100 MBBS seats, construction was going on in November 2024. MBBS admissions from 2026-27 session.
  - Bhagwan Parshuram Government Medical College, Kaithal at Sapan Kheri village with 100 MBBS seats, 500 beds, on 20 acre costing Rs 950 crore, foundation stone was laid by the Chief Minister Khattar in October 2023. MBBS admissions from 2026-27 session.
  - Sant Shiromani Shri Dhanna Bhagat Ji Government Medical College, Jind at Haibatpur village with 100 MBBS seats, construction was ongoing in November 2024. MBBS admissions from 2026-27 session.
  - NC Medical College and Hospital Panipat (private) at Israna operational since 2019 with 150 MBBS seats.
  - Maharaja Agrasen Kedar Nath Gupta Medical College, Bahadurgarh 23 acre, 150 MBBS seats, 675 bed hospital, operational since 2025.
  - Government Medical College, Palwal at Pelak village on NH-334D Aligarh-Palwal Highway with 100 MBBS seats. MBBS admissions from 2027-28 session.
  - Proposed at upcoming districts
    - Medical college at Dabwali-Haripura (jointly with Rajasthan and Punjab)
    - Medical college at Narwana subdivision
    - Medical college at Hansi-Kanwari area
    - Medical college at Mundhal-Meham area
    - Medical college at Loharu-Bidhwan area
    - Medical college at Kosli
    - Medical college at Mahendragarh city
    - Medical college at Narayangarh city
    - Medical college at Farukh Nagar-Pataudi
    - Medical college at Firozpur Jhirka city
    - Medical college at Hodal city
- AIIMS
  - All India Institute of Medical Sciences, Majra in Rewari district, 100 seats MBBS admissions from 2026-27 session
  - All India Institute of Medical Sciences, Badsa, Jhajjar district
