= Ladwa (disambiguation) =

Ladwa could refer to one of these:

- Ladwa, a town in the Kurukshetra district of Haryana, India
  - Ladwa (Vidhan Sabha constituency)
- Ladwa, Hisar, a village in the Hisar district of Haryana, India
