= Singhwa Khas =

Singhwa Khas Singhwa
- Town, small city
- Location in Haryana, India Singhwa Khas (India)
- Coordinates: 29.02°N 76.22°E
- Country: India
- State: Haryana
- District: Hisar

Languages
  - Official: Hindi, Regional Haryanvi
- Time zone: UTC+5:30 (IST)
- Postal code: 1742815
- ISO 3166 code: IN-HR
- Website: haryana.gov.in

Singhwa Khas is a village in Hisar district of Haryana state in India.
