= Shanti Niketan Vidyapeeth, Hisar =

Private colleges in Haryana, India

- Other names: SNV, Hisar
- Type: Private trust
- Established: 1977
- Parent institution: Government of Haryana
- Academic affiliations: Kurukshetra University
- Chairman: S.S. Dalal
- Principal: Wazir Singh Panwar, Ex-Commandant of BSF
- Location: Tosham road, Ladwa, Hisar, Haryana, India; 29.0615°N 75.7684°E
- Campus: Rural
- Area: 48 acres (19 ha)
- Website: www.snsshisar.org

Shanti Niketan Vidyapeeth, Hisar is a non-profit private trust run group of several educational institutes located in Ladwa village on Tosham road near Hisar in the Indian state of Haryana.

== Location ==
It lies on Hisar-Tosham road to the east of the college.

== Institutes ==
The vidyapeeth has following colleges:

- Shanti Niketan College of Engineering
- Shanti Niketan Institute of Engineering & Technology
- SD Shanti Niketan Institute of Engineering & Technology
- Shanti Niketan College of Education
- Shanti Niketan College

== Courses ==
The college offers undergraduate and post-graduate courses in arts, science, commerce, business, computer and electronics.

- Shanti Niketan College of Engineering
  - M.Tech. Computer Science Engineering
  - M.Tech. Mechanical Engineering
  - B.Tech. Computer Science Engineering
  - B.Tech. Elecetronics & Comm. Engineering
  - B.Tech. Mechanical Engineering
  - B.Tech. Civil Engineering
  - B.Tech. Information Technology
- Shanti Niketan Institute of Engineering & Technology
  - Diploma in Computer Science
  - Diploma in Electrical Engineering
  - Diploma in Electronics & Comm. Engineering
  - Diploma in Mechanical Engineering
- SD Shanti Niketan Institute of Engineering & Technology
  - Diploma in Computer Science
  - Diploma in Civil Engineering
  - Diploma in Electronics & Comm. Engineering
  - Diploma in Mechanical Engineering
- Shanti Niketan College of Education
  - M.Ed.
  - B.Ed.
  - D.Ed.
- Shanti Niketan College
  - B.Sc.
  - B.Com.
  - B.A.

== See also ==
- Visva-Bharati University at Shantiniketan in West Bengal established by Rabindranath Tagore
- Hisar district
- List of Universities and Colleges in Hisar
- List of schools in Hisar
- List of institutions of higher education in Haryana
