= Kharbala, Hisar =

Kharbala
- Village
- Location within Haryana Location within India
- Coordinates: 29.093389°N 76.114260°E
- Country: India
- State: Haryana
- District: Hisar

Government
  - Type: Local government
  - Body: Panchayat

Languages
  - Official: Hindi
- Time zone: UTC+5:30 (IST)
- PIN: 125042
- Vehicle registration: HR-21
- Website: haryana.gov.in

Kharbala is a village in tehsil Hansi-II in Hissar district, Haryana state, India. It is approximately 21 km from Hansi via NH9, 40 km from Jind via NH14, 35 km from Bhiwani via NH14, 51 km from Hisar via NH9 and 121 km from Delhi via NH9.

== Administration ==
There are 2 Government Schools.

== Population ==
The Kharbala village has population of 5380 of which 2891 are males while 2489 are females as per Population Census 2011.

In Kharbala village population of children with age 0-6 is 707 which makes up 13.14% of total population of village. Average Sex Ratio of Kharbala village is 861 which is lower than Haryana state average of 879. Child Sex Ratio for the Kharbala as per census is 763, lower than Haryana average of 834.

Kharbala village has lower literacy rate compared to Haryana. In 2011, literacy rate of Kharbala village was 72.01% compared to 75.55% of Haryana. In Kharbala Male literacy stands at 81.85% while female literacy rate was 60.79%.
