= Ladwa, Hisar =

- village
- Location within Haryana Location within India
- Coordinates: 29.0615°N 75.7684°E
- Country: India
- State: Haryana
- District: Hisar
- Division: Hisar

Government
  - Body: Panchayat
- Elevation: 215 m (705 ft)

Languages
  - Official: Hindi,
- Time zone: UTC+5:30 (IST)
- PIN: 125 xxx
- UNLOCODE: IN HSS
- Telephone code: 91-1662 xxx xxx
- Vehicle registration: HR-20 xxxx (for non-commercial vehicles); HR-39 xxxx (for commercial vehicles)
- Nearest city: New Delhi, Chandigarh
- Lok Sabha constituency: Hisar
- Vidhan Sabha constituency: Barwala
- Climate: Cw (Köppen)
- Precipitation: 490.6 millimetres (19.31 in)
- Avg. summer temperature: 32.5 °C (90.5 °F)
- Avg. winter temperature: 17.6 °C (63.7 °F)
- Website: www.hisar.nic.in

Ladwa village, (not to be confused with Ladwa town in Kurukshetra district), is a village on Hisar-Tosham road in Hisar district and Hisar division in the state of Haryana in northwestern India. The village is mostly of Hindu Jaat people.Temple of Baba Nihal giri ji has established in village since long time.

== Location ==
It lies on Hisar-Tosham road to the east of the college. It is located 164 km (102 mi) to the west of New Delhi, India's capital.

== Shri Ladwa Gaushala ==
Shri Ladwa Gaushala cow protection shelter is located here.

== Ladwa Cancer Center ==
Ladwa Cancer Center is located here.

== Education ==
- Shanti Niketan Vidyapeeth, Hisar has following colleges:
  - Shanti Niketan College of Engineering
  - Shanti Niketan Institute of Engineering & Technology
  - SD Shanti Niketan Institute of Engineering & Technology
  - Shanti Niketan College of Education Official website
  - Shanti Niketan College

== See also ==
- Kanwari
- Hisar district
- List of universities and colleges in Hisar
- List of schools in Hisar
- List of institutions of higher education in Haryana
