= Lakshman Wijesekara =

Sri Lankan singer (1948–2021)

- ලක්ෂ්මන් විජේසේකර
- Born: Ravindranath Lakshman de Alwis Wijesekera; 14 March 1948
- Died: 12 November 2021 (aged 73); Colombo, Sri Lanka
- Education: Maliyadeva College
- Occupations: Singer; musician; actor; producer; teacher
- Spouse: Chandra Kaluarachchi
- Children: Ama Wijesekera; Vihanga Wijesekera
- Parents: Walter Wijesekera (father); Daisy Wijesekera (mother)
- Relatives: Wimal Katipearachchi (son-in-law)
- Musical career
- Genres: Pop; soul; rhythm and blues; Indian classical music
- Instruments: Vocals,Guitar,Violin
- Years active: 1975–2021
- Labels: Nilwala; Ransilu

Ravindranath Lakshman de Alwis Wijesekera (Sinhala: ලක්ෂ්මන් විජේසේකර; 14 March 1948 – 12 November 2021), popularly known as Lakshman Wijesekara, was a Sri Lankan singer, composer, actor, director of advertising and teacher by profession. One of the most respected artists in Sri Lanka, Lakshman has excelled in both music and acting in a career spanned more than five decades.

== Personal life ==
Wijesekara was born on 14 March 1948 to Walter Wijesekera and Daisy Wijesekera. His father was once a student at Shanti Niketan and was a musician as well as a connoisseur. He was a regular public servant in the local government service and could not continue in his music career. According to his father's job, Lakshman had to move from place to place in Sri Lanka for 5 years, where he attended several schools. He took his primary education from Anuradhapura Central College and later at Maliyadeva College, Kurunegala.

He was married to fellow actress Chandra Kaluarachchi in 1975 and they had one daughter, Ama, and one son, Vihanga. Kaluarachchi was born on 6 April 1943 and died on 1 November 2019 at the age of 76. His daughter Ama is also an award winning actress in Sinhala cinema best known for the roles in the films Loku Duwa, Duwata Mawaka Misa and Irasma. Ama is married to Wimal Katipearachchi, a veteran journalist, literary figure and poet.

He died on 12 November 2021 at the age of 73 while receiving treatment at the Kotelawala Defense University Hospital. His remains were laid at his residence: 140/31 S, Kalapura Templers Road, Mount Lavinia. His last rites were held on 14 November 2021 at the Mt. Lavinia public cemetery.

== Career ==
During his life at Maliyadeva College, Wijesekara studied music from the school teacher K. M. Dayapala. With his guidance and training, Lakshman entered the Government Conservatory in 1968. Then he graduated from the Government College of Music (Haywood). While studying at the Government College of Music, Lakshman had the opportunity to associate with renowned musicians as well as join their programs and sing ensembles. In 1975, he graduated as a radio singer from Sri Lanka Broadcasting Corporation. In the same year, he performed his first simple song program and sang the first song "Ai Tharahin".

Then he made his first appointment as a music teacher at Anuradhapura Central College. He continued to work as a teacher for 18 years from 1975 to 1993 in many schools across the island including Isipathana College, and DS Senanayake College, Colombo. After resigned from teaching, he joined his contemporary musicians Rohana Weerasinghe and Ananda Weerasiri at the College of Music and started a music resort called Kalabhumi. In the preceding years, he sang many popular hits and duets such as: "Bala Lamawarune", "Delwoo Pahan", "Sina Pipena", "Supem Hengum", "Sanda Kinith Nemi". The song "Delwoo Pahan" was sung by him along with Chandralekha Perera for the teledrama Rekha directed by D. B. Nihalsinghe.

Apart from music, he worked as an actor in television and cinema. His film debut came through 1999 film Pinyarayanga directed by Amaranath Jayatilleke. Then he acted in the films Yuvathipathi, and Athuru Mithuru. Meanwhile he entered television serials and made the landmark role of "Nissanka" in the romantic drama serial Ganga Saha Nissanka, where he also made the duet "Sina Pipena Me Wasanthaya" with Samitha Mudunkotuwa. Then he acted in few teledramas such as Rekha, Ira Paaya and Dath Kekulu Paala. In the 1980s, he became a television music presenter with the children's program Gaayana. Then he presented the programs: Ranpat Raṭā, Bakmahē Mal Mangallē, Gama Hinā Vuṇā.

He was the music director of P.U.D Perera's short films Sinḍarellā gē Sereppuva, and Sudu Aethāgē Kathāva. Apart from that, he directed music for the television serials such as: Bumuthuruna, Himi Ahimi, Mawakage Geetha, Manamali, Vilambeetha, Dangayanta Pamanai and Tikiri Saha Ungi. In the meantime, he engaged with many theatre plays as the music director, including: Sapathēru Hāminē, Jayalath Manorathne's Puthra Samāgama, Neil Alles' Sihina Saāppuva, Bandula Vithanage's' Senehebara Dolly. In 1985, he won the State Award for Best Musical for the play Sihina Saāppuva. He also performed on stage when he sang on stage as a singer in the Jayathurapura Choir in Prof. Sarachchandra's Wessanthara Geethanga.

On 17 March 2018, he performed the concert titled 'Sanda Kinithi Nemi' at 7.00 pm at the Nelum Pokuna Theater to celebrate his four decades of artistic career.

== Politics ==
Apart from drama and music, Wijesekara made notable contributions in politics as well. After the formation of the Free Arts Alliance against the then tyrannical rule in 1994, he joined the public awareness campaigns throughout the island. Later in 2014, he made another notable feat to dismiss the rule of current government at that time. In that year, a group of artists from the "New Generation of Young Artists" organization left for Kurunegala. On the afternoon of 29 December, they were attacked by a group of North Western Provincial Councilor Kamal Indika and members of the Blue Brigade wearing T-shirts while performing a musical show titled Mulawen Midemu at Kumbukgate Junction in Kurunegala. The group included Lakshman, Samanalee Fonseka, Kasun Kalhara, Indrachapa Liyanage, Ama Wijesekera, and Mohan Raj Madawala.
