= Fateh Chand College for Women (Lahore), Hisar =

College in Hisar, Haryana, India

- Other names: FC College, Hisar
- Type: Public
- Established: 1935 Lahore, moved to Hisar 1954
- Academic affiliations: Guru Jambheshwar University of Science and Technology
- Academic staff: 50
- Administrative staff: 18
- Students: 3,253
- Location: Hisar, Haryana, India; 29.1604°N 75.7162°E
- Campus: Urban, 7 acres (2.8 ha)
- Website: Official website

Fateh Chand College for Women (Lahore), Hisar or FC College, Hisar is a public funded college located in Hisar in the Indian state of Haryana .

== History ==
In 1935, it was established in Lahore (current Pakistan) by Rai Fateh Chand and after the partition of India in 1947, it was rehabilitated at Hisar in 1954.

== Details ==
The college offers undergraduate and post-graduate courses in arts, commerce, science.

== Notable alumni ==
- FC College at Lahore
  - Teji Bachhan, mother of Amitabh Bachhan taught English there.
  - Krishna Sobti (did not graduate; her education was halted by the Partition)
- FC College relocated to Hisar
  - Krishna Poonia, winner of gold medal for Discus Throw in 2010 Delhi Commonwealth Games

== See also ==
- List of Universities and Colleges in Hisar
- List of schools in Hisar
- List of institutions of higher education in Haryana
