= Krishna Sobti =

Indian Hindi-language writer and essayist (1925–2019)

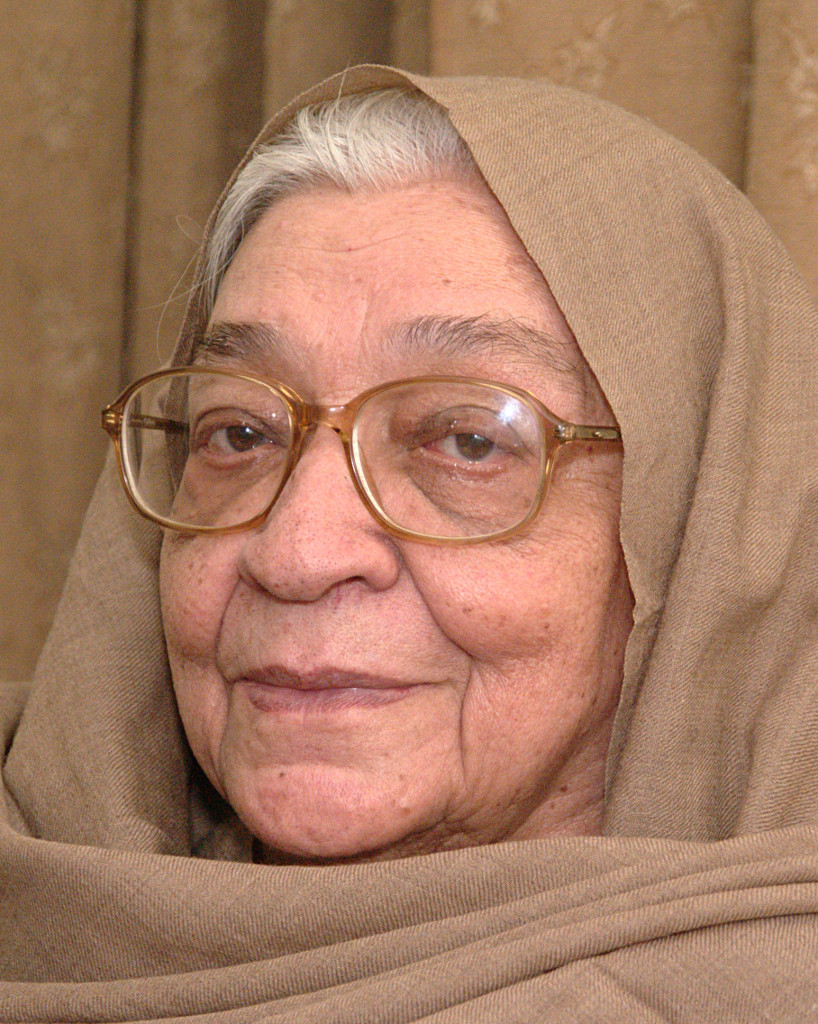
- Sobti in 2011
- Born: 18 February 1925; Gujrat, Punjab Province, British India
- Died: 25 January 2019 (aged 93); New Delhi, India
- Education: Fateh Chand College for Women, Lahore (did not graduate)
- Occupations: Fiction writer, essayist
- Spouse: Shivnath
- Writing career
- Language: Hindi
- Years active: 1944–2018
- Notable works: Zindaginama; Mitro Marajani; Daar Se Bichchuri; Surajmukhi Andhere Ke
- Notable awards: Sahitya Akademi Award (1980); Sahitya Akademi Fellowship (1996); Jnanpith Award (2017)

Krishna Sobti (18 February 1925 – 25 January 2019) was an Indian Hindi-language fiction writer and essayist. She won the Sahitya Akademi Award in 1980 for her novel Zindaginama and in 1996, was awarded the Sahitya Akademi Fellowship, the highest award of the Akademi. In 2017, she received the Jnanpith Award for her contribution to Indian literature.

Sobti is best known for her 1966 novel Mitro Marajani, an unapologetic portrayal of a married woman's sexuality. She was also the recipient of the first Katha Chudamani Award, in 1999, for Lifetime Literary Achievement, apart from winning the Shiromani Award in 1981, Hindi Academy Award in 1982, Shalaka Award of the Hindi Academy Delhi and in 2008, her novel Samay Sargam was selected for Vyas Samman, instituted by the K. K. Birla Foundation.

Considered the grande dame of Hindi literature, Krishna Sobti was born in Gujrat, Punjab, now in Pakistan; she also wrote under the name Hashmat and has published Hum Hashmat, a compilation of pen portraits of writers and friends. Her other novels are Daar Se Bichchuri, Surajmukhi Andhere Ke, Yaaron Ke Yaar, Zindaginama. Some of her well-known short stories are Nafisa, Sikka Badal gaya, Badalom ke ghere. A selection of her major works are published in Sobti Eka Sohabata. A number of her works are now available in English and Urdu.

In 2005, Dil-o-Danish, translated into The Heart Has Its Reasons in English by Reema Anand and Meenakshi Swami of Katha Books, won the Crossword Award in the Indian Language Fiction Translation category. Her publications have been translated to multiple Indian and foreign languages such as Swedish, Russian and English.

== Biography ==
Sobti was born on 18 February 1925 in Gujrat city of the Punjab province of British India, (Gujrat, became a part of Pakistan after partition). She was educated in Delhi and Shimla. She attended school along with her three siblings, and her family worked for the colonial British government. She initially began her higher education at Fatehchand College in Lahore, but returned to India when the Partition of India took place. Immediately after partition, she worked for two years as a governess to Maharaja Tej Singh (b.1943), the child-Maharaja of Sirohi in Rajasthan, India. In her old age, when she was past her 70th birthday, she married Dogri writer Shivnath who, by a remarkable coincidence, was born on the same day of the same year as her. The couple settled into his flat in Mayur Vihar near Patparganj in East Delhi. Shivnath died a few years later, and Krishna continued to reside alone in the same apartment.

She died on 25 January 2019, in Delhi after a long illness.

== Writing ==
Sobti's use of idiomatic Punjabi and Urdu while writing in Hindi has expanded over time to include Rajasthani as well. The intermingling of Urdu, Punjabi and Hindi cultures, influenced the language used in her works. She was known for using new writing styles. The characters in her stories were 'bold', 'daring' and ready to accept challenges. Her ability to adapt dialect and language specifically to the region she is writing about has been praised by critics for lending authenticity to her characters. It has also been cited as a reason for the difficulty in translating her works to other languages. Although Sobti's works deal closely with issues of female identity and sexuality, she has resisted being labelled as a 'woman writer' and has spoken of the importance of occupying both, masculine and feminine viewpoints, as a writer.

Her writing style and idiom, as also her choice of subjects, has attracted some amount of criticism. It has been said that she uses too much profanity in her writings, often gratuitously, and that her style of writing is "unliterary." She has also been accused of being obsessed with sex, the redeeming feature being that descriptions of sex in her works are always from the perspective of a woman character, and no work of fiction ever produced by her has failed to feature at least one intensely sexualised woman character. A selection of her major works are published in Sobti Eka Sohabata. Her publications have been translated to multiple Indian and foreign languages such as Swedish, Russian and English.

=== Fiction ===
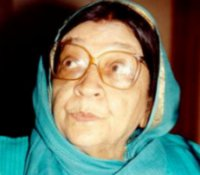
Krishna Sobti

Sobti initially established herself as a writer of short stories, with her stories Lama (about a Tibetan Buddhist priest), and Nafisa being published in 1944. In the same year, she also published her famous story about the Partition of India, called Sikka Badal Gaya, which she sent to Sachchidananda Vatsyayan, a fellow writer and the editor of the journal, Prateek, who accepted it for publication without any changes. Sobti has cited this incident as confirming her choice to write professionally.

==== Zindaginama ====
Sobti submitted the manuscript of her first novel, titled Channa, to the Leader Press in Allahabad in 1952. The manuscript was accepted and printed, however, Sobti found on receiving proofs that the Press had made textual alterations, and consequently sent them a telegram asking them to cease printing.Sobti has said that the alterations included linguistic changes that altered her use of Punjabi and Urdu words to Sanskrit words.

She withdrew the book from publication, and paid to have the printed copies destroyed. She was subsequently persuaded by Sheela Sandhu, publisher at Rajkamal Prakashan, to revisit the manuscript, and it was published by Rajkamal Prakashan as Zindaginama: Zinda Rukh in 1979 after extensive rewriting. Sobti went on to win the Sahitya Akademi Award for Zindaginama in 1980. Zindaginama: Zinda Rukh is nominally an account of rural life in a village in Punjab, in the early 1900s, but addresses political and social concerns of the time. It has been described by the writer and critic Trisha Gupta as a "universally acclaimed part of the Hindi literary canon." Nand Kishore Naval, a critic, has referred to it as "the most comprehensive, sympathetic, and sensitive treatment of the peasants" in Hindi literature since Munshi Premchand.

Litigation against Amrita Pritam

Soon after Zindaginama was republished, the poet, novelist and essayist Amrita Pritam published a book titled Hardatt Ka Zindaginama. Sobti filed a suit in 1984 for damages against Pritam, claiming that Pritam had violated her copyright through the use of a similar title. The suit was litigated for 26 years and was ultimately decided in favour of Pritam, six years after Pritam's death, in 2011. Part of the delay was caused by the disappearance of a box of evidence containing original manuscripts of both, Pritam's and Sobti's novels, from the court. Sobti has since expressed disappointment at the outcome of the suit, noting that her original plan of writing Zindaginama as part of a trilogy was interrupted by the litigation.

==== Other works ====
Sobti published several other novels to acclaim. Dar Se Bichhadi (Separated from the door of the house), published in 1958, was set in pre-Partition India, and concerned a child born from a marriage that crossed religious and social boundaries. This was followed by Mitro Marjani (To Hell with you Mitro!), in 1966, a novel set in rural Punjab that concerned a young married woman's exploration and assertion of her sexuality. Mitro Marjani was translated to English by Gita Rajan and Raji Narasimha as To Hell with You, Mitro and propelled Sobti to fame. Scholar and critic Nikhil Govind has said that Mitro Marjani "allowed the Hindi novel to break out of the straitjacket of social realism, or the more stereotyped notions of ‘women's fiction’." Her next novel, Surajmukhi Andhere Ke (Sunflowers of the Dark) was published in 1972 and dealt with a woman's struggle to come to terms with childhood abuse, and was preceded by two novellas in 1968, Yaaron Ke Yaar (Friends of Friends) and Tin Pahar. Ai Ladki, (Hey Girl) a more recent novel, narrates the relationship between an old woman on her deathbed and her daughter, who acts as her companion and nurse. Sobti has also written a novel that is a fictionalised autobiography, titled Gujrat Pakistan Se Gujarat Hindustan Taq (From Gujrat, Pakistan, to Gujarat, India). Her most recent novel is Dil-o-Danish (Heart and Mind).

=== Non-fiction ===
Beginning in the 1960s, Sobti has also published a series of short profiles and columns under masculine pseudonym Hashmat. These were compiled and published as Ham Hashmat in 1977, and included profiles of Bhisham Sahni, Nirmal Verma, and Namwar Singh. She has said, concerning her pseudonym that, "We both have different identities. I protect, and he reveals; I am ancient, he is new and fresh; we operate from opposite directions." Her columns, written as Hashmat, have won praise from authors and critics, including the writer Ashok Vajpeyi, who said of them that "Nobody has written so endearingly of writers." as well as from Sukrita Paul Kumar, who has suggested that the use of a male pseudonym enabled Sobti to write without inhibition about her peers.

== Works ==
A list of some of her major works is below.

=== Novels ===
- Zindaginama
- Mitro Marjani
- Daar Se Bichchudi
- Surajmukhi Andhere Ke
- Yaaron Ke Yaar (Friend of Friends)
- Samay Sargam (Time's Musical Notes)
- Ai Ladaki
- Zindaginama
- Dil-o-Danish
- Badalon ke Ghere (Circles of Clouds)
- Gujarat Pakistan Se Gujarat Hindustan (From Gujarat in Pakistan to Gujarat in India)
- Hum Hashmat
- Tin Pahad
- Muktibodh: Ek Vyaktitva Sahi Ki Talash Mein, (Muktibodh: A Personality in Search of Right)
- Shabdon Ke Alok Mein, (In the Light of Words),
- Sobti Ek Sohbat, (Sobti: A Company),
- Lekhak Ka Jantantra, (A Writer’s Democracy)
- Marfat Dilli, (C/O Delhi)
- Jaini Meharban Singh
- Buddha ka kamandal Laddakh

=== Translations ===
- To hell with you Mitro! (Mitro Marjani)
- Memory's Daughter (Daar Se Bichchudi)
- Listen Girl (Ai Ladki)
- Zindaginamah – Zinda Rukh (Urdu)
- The Heart Has Its Reasons (Dil-O-Danish)

=== Short stories ===
- Nafisa
- Sikka Badal gaya

== Honours and awards ==
Sobti won the Sahitya Akademi Award for Zindaginama in 1980. Sobti was also appointed a Fellow of the Sahitya Akademi, India's National Academy of Letters, in 1996. In the citation given to her following her appointment, the Akademi praised her oeuvre and writing, saying that, "Renewing at every step her five-decade long creativity with fresh insights and dimensions, Krishna Sobti has regarded literature as the true play-field of life, and she has held a formidable mirror to this life." In 2015, she returned both, the Award, and her Fellowship, citing governmental inaction following riots in Dadri, concerns regarding freedom of speech, as well as comments made by a government minister concerning Hindi writers.

She was offered the Padma Bhushan by the Government of India in 2010, which she declined, stating that, "As a writer, I have to keep a distance from the establishment. I think I did the right thing." She received Jnanpith Award in 2017 for her 'path-breaking contribution to Indian literature'. The Bharatiya Jnanpith mentioned in the statement that 'the language used by Sobti in her writings is influenced by the intermingling of Hindi, Urdu and Punjabi cultures where her characters are always bold and daring – ready to accept all challenges thrown by the society'.

She was also a recipient of Shiromani Award (1981), Maithili Sharan Gupt Samman and other awards.

== Works online ==
- The Moving Finger – Story
- Ai Ladki – Story
- Krishna Sobti works in Hindi, at The Library of Congress
- Phone Baj Raha Hai – Memoir (Hindi)
- Krishna Sobti: Musing on the Creative Process
