= Agroha Dham =

- Agroha Dham

Religion
- Affiliation: Hinduism
- District: Hisar
- Deity: Mahalakshmi
- Festival: Agroha Maha Kumbh
- Governing body: Agroha Vikas Trust

Location
- Location: Agroha (town)
- State: Haryana
- Country: India
- Interactive map of Agroha Dham
- Coordinates: 29°19′54″N 75°37′31″E

Architecture
- Type: Vastu Shastra
- Creator: Tilak Raj Aggarwal
- Established: 1984
- Completed: 1984

Specifications
- Temple: 3
- Monument: 1

Website
- http://www.agroha.com/

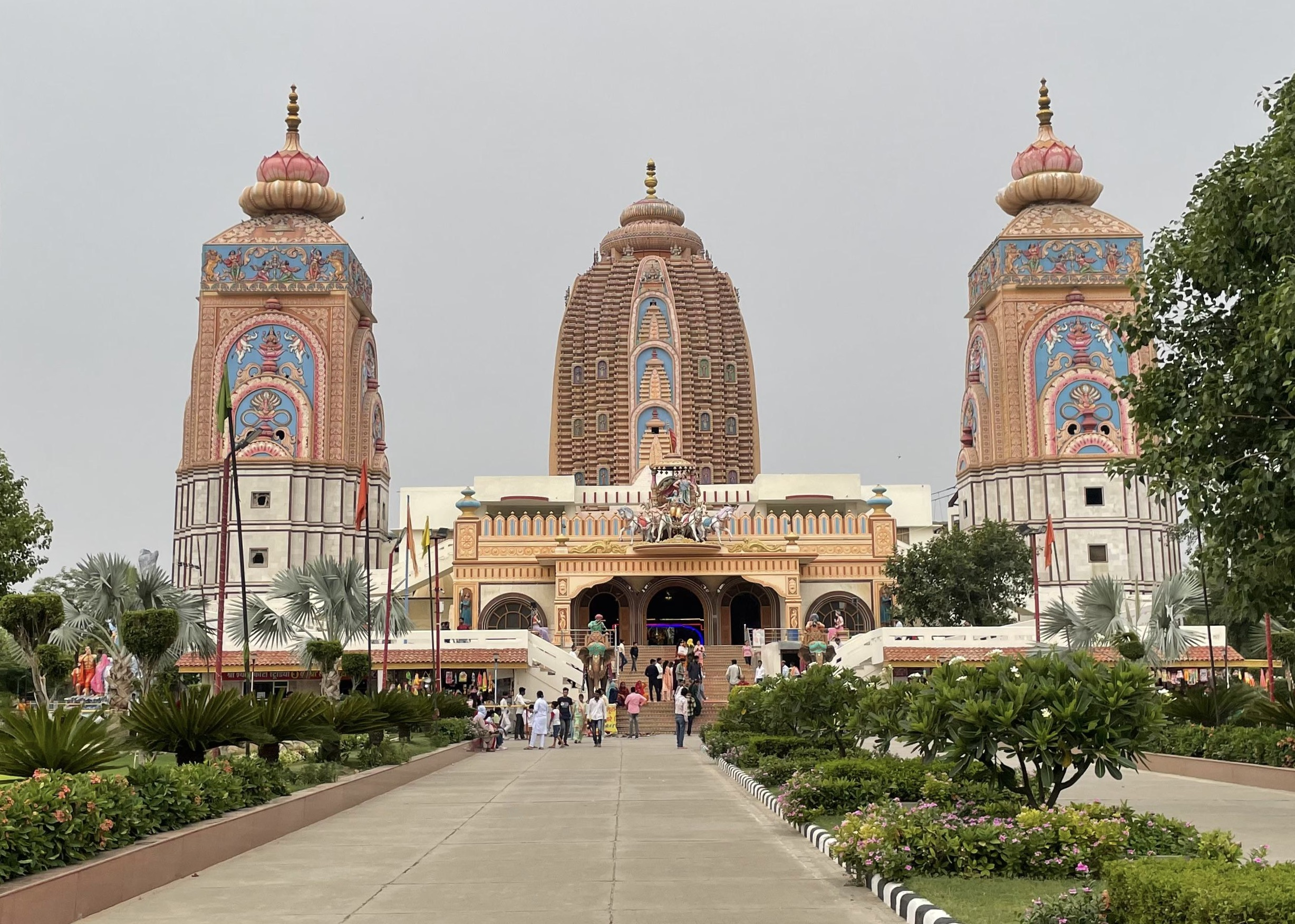
The entrance to the Agroha Dhaam Hindu temple located in Agroha.

Agroha is a Hindu temple complex in Agroha city of Hisar District of Haryana state of India. Construction started in 1976 and was completed in 1984. The main temple is dedicated to the Hindu goddess Mahalakshmi. The temple complex is located adjacent to the Agroha Mound and near Maharaja Agrasen Medical College.

== History ==
Agroha is the historical place where the Agrawal community originated in antiquity. in 1194, Agroha was captured by Ghori and the settlement at Agroha declined, and people settled in nearby Hansi, Hissar, Delhi and places further away. Agroha became desolate. in 1907, an ascetic Brahmananda Brahmachari arrive an Agroha. He organized a group named Agrawal Darbar in 1908 by inspiring the Agrawal community representatives (Panchayat). A gaushala, a shiva temple, and 18 sati shrines were established. Marwari Agrawals of Calcutta such as Tarachand Ghanshyamdas supported the project.

The decision to construct the modern temple was made at the convention of All India Aggarwal Representatives in 1976. The trust was established for this purpose under Shri Krishna Modi and Rameshwar Das Gupta. The land was donated to the trust by Laxmi Narain Gupta and construction was started under the supervision of Tilak Raj Aggarwal. The construction of the main temple was completed in 1984 while construction of other features started in 1985 under Subhash Goel.

== Agroha Vikas Trust ==
Agroha Vikas Trust is the temple board responsible for the building and maintenance of the temple complex. It was founded in 1976.

== The temple complex ==
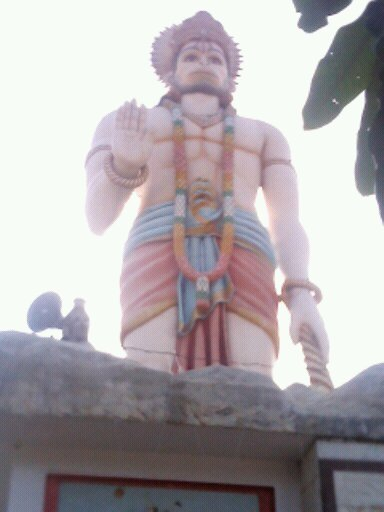
Hanuman temple

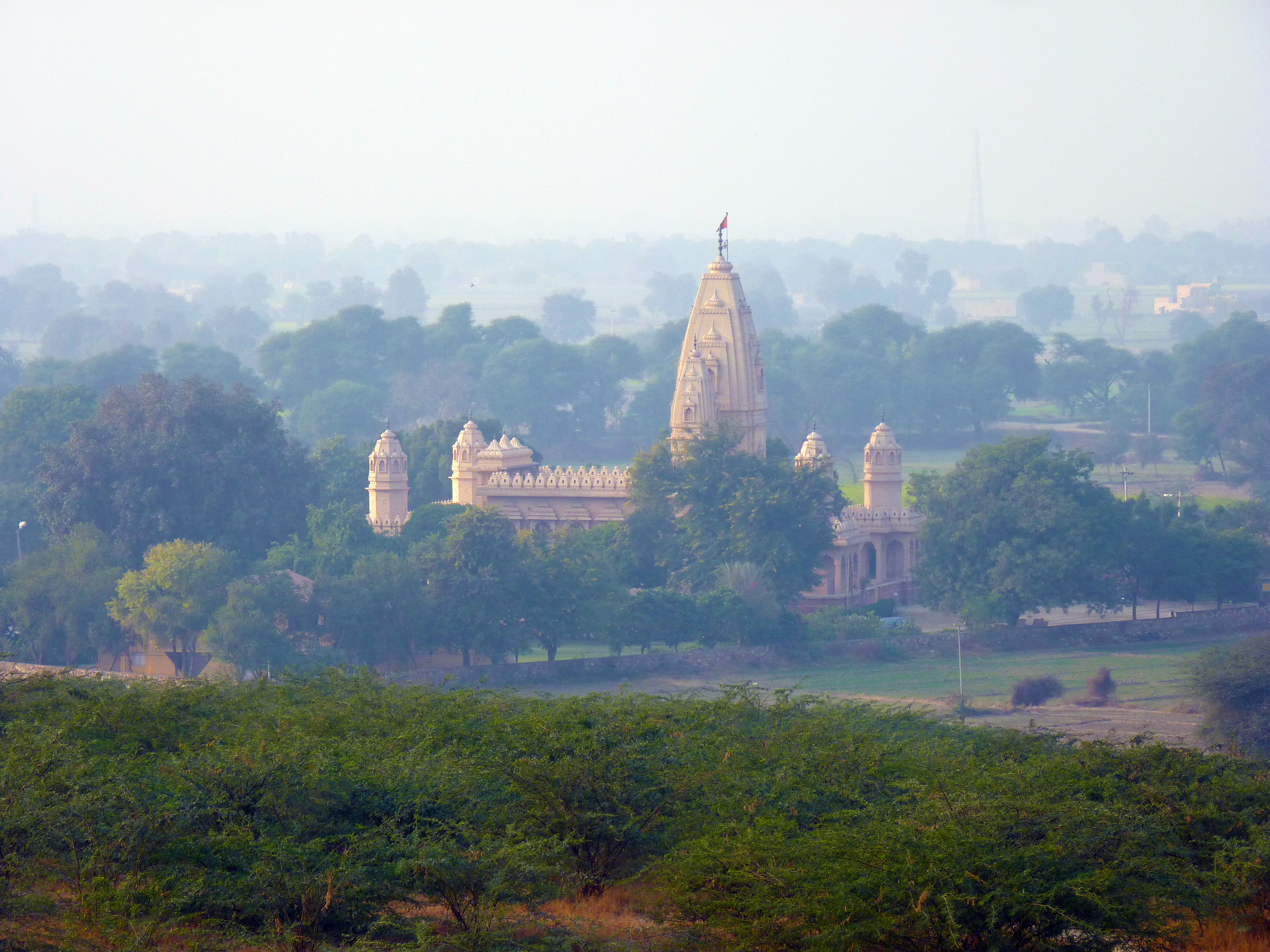
Sheela Mata Temple Agroha

=== Main temple with 3 wings ===
The main temple is divided into three wings. The central wing is dedicated to Hindu goddess Mahalakshmi, western wing to goddess Saraswati and eastern wing to Maharaja Agrasena.

=== Adya Mahalaxmi temple ===
In 2021, plan was announced to build INR100 crore Adya Mahalaxmi temple, dedicated to Adi Mahalakshmi designed by the designers of the Ayodhya Ram Janmabhoomi temple, will be 108 feet tall and it will be constructed on 10 acre land.

=== Sarovar ===
Shakti Sarovar is a large pond behind the temple complex. It was filled with water from 41 rivers of India in 1988. A platform at the north-west end depicts the scene of Samudra manthan. A naturopathy center is located near Shakti Sarovar, where treatment is done through yoga. An amusement park with a boating site has been built near the complex.

== Festival ==
The Agroha Maha Kumbh festival is held every year on Sharad Purnima.

== See also ==
- Agroha development plan
- Agroha Mound
- Rakhigarhi
