= Uklana Mandi =

- city
- Location in Haryana, India Uklana Mandi (India)
- Coordinates: 29.5167°N 75.8667°E
- Country: India
- State: Haryana
- District: Hisar

Government
  - MLA: Anoop Dhanak

Population (2011)
  - Total: 13,219

Languages
  - Official: Hindi, English
  - Regional: Haryanvi, Bagri
- Time zone: UTC+5:30 (IST)
- PIN: 125113
- Telephone code: +911693
- Vehicle registration: HR 80, HR 20, HR 39
- Website: http://www.uklana.in

Uklana Mandi is a city, municipal committee and Uklana (Vidhan Sabha constituency), in Hisar district in the Indian state of Haryana.

== Education ==
Schools in the region include:

- Golden Public School, Surewala Chowk
- Oxford Public School, Daulatpur Road
- Government College, Uklana
- New C.R. Sr. Sec. School, Uklana
- Jain adshiwer High school (Sanjay Gupta)
