= Barwala, Hisar =

Barwala
- City in Hisar District
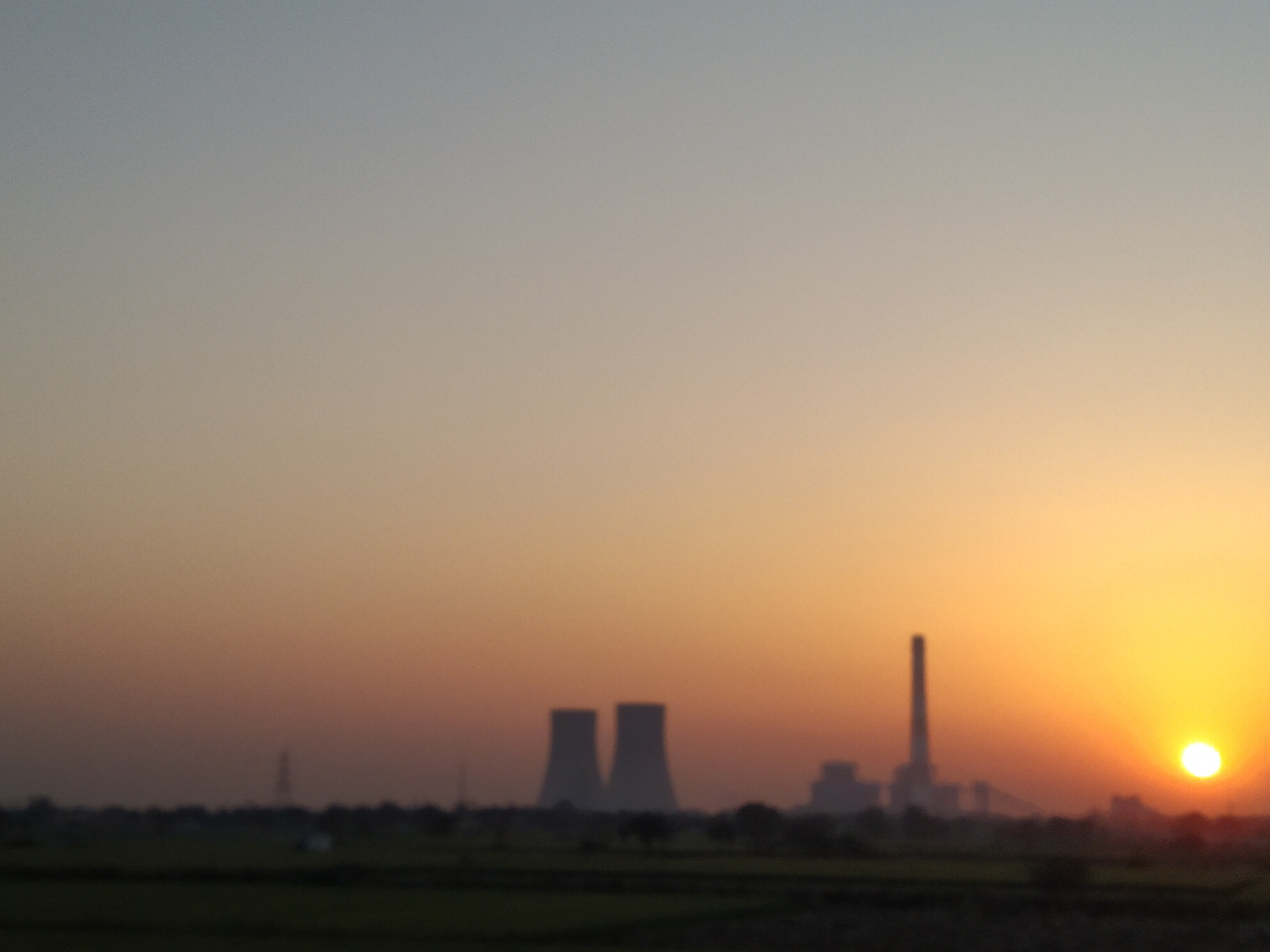
- Sunset at Rajiv Gandhi Thermal Power Station, Barwala, Hisar

- Location in Haryana, India Barwala (India)
- Coordinates: 29.38°N 75.92°E
- Country: India
- State: Haryana
- District: Hisar

Government
  - Body: Tehsil
- Elevation: 214 m (702 ft)

Population (2001)
  - Total: 89,000

Languages
  - Official: Hindi, English
  - Regional: Haryanvi language, Bagri
- Time zone: UTC+5:30 (IST)
- Postal code: 125121
- Telephone code: 01693
- ISO 3166 code: IN-HR
- Vehicle registration: HR 80
- Website: haryana.gov.in

Barwala is a city and a municipal council situated 30 km northeast of Hisar city. It is one of the 4 sub-division of Hisar district in the state of Haryana, India.

== History ==
According to the local tradition, the town was founded by the Raja Bal, and wala in Hindi means of or belonging to. Hence, Bala+wala means [town] belonging to Bal, which in corrupted form came to be known Barwala.

Coins of Agratya were excavated here, which indicates that the town was once under the rule of nearby Agroha.

During Muhammad of Ghor's invasion of India, his generals - two brothers named Sayyad Niamat Ullah and Mir Hassan fought here. Niamat Ullah was killed at Hansi Fort, where he was buried; Mir Hassan's successors at Barwala.

A Shivalaya to the north of the town possibly dates back to the early medieval period.

Barwala is listed in the Ain-i-Akbari as a pargana under Hisar Sarkar, producing a revenue of 1,097,807 dams for the imperial treasury and supplying a force of 1500 infantry and 100 cavalry.

From 1852 to 1891, Barwala was a tehsil during the British Raj. It was made a tehsil again after the formation of Haryana.

== Geography ==
Barwala is located at map location of Barwala. It has an average elevation of 214 metres (702 feet).

== Demographics ==
As of 2001 India census, Barwala had a population of 43,384. Males constitute 52.5% of the population and females 47.5%. Barwala has an average literacy rate of 63.5%, above the national average of 59.5%; with 55% of the males and 45% of females literate. 8.5% of the population is under 6 years of age.

== Education ==
- Government College, Barwala

== History ==
Barwala was located in the honour of the king Raja Barwala. After his name the barwala city was named. In the 19th century there was the kingdom of Muslims.

Barwala is home to the Satlok ashram of Rampal. In November 2014, thousands of his followers gathered around his ashram to prevent the police from arresting him. Around 200 people were injured in the resulting violent clashes.
