= Saurabh Ajay Gupta =

Indian Supreme Court advocate (born 1980)

- Born: 21 October 1980 (age 46)
- Education: Symbiosis Law College (B.A., LL.B.)
- Occupations: Advocate, additional advocate general, Government of Chhattisgarh in the Supreme Court of India
- Years active: 16
- Spouse: Alpika Agarwal

Saurabh Ajay Gupta is an Advocate-on-Record in Supreme Court of India. He is also the additional advocate general for Government of Chhattisgarh in Supreme Court. Formerly he has held position of additional advocate general for Government of Punjab, India in Supreme Court for around seven years.

He is better known for handling cases related to Prevention of Corruption Act matters, matters relation to Prevention of Money Laundering Act, mining and leases, insolvency and bankruptcy, arbitration proceedings at the appellate courts.

== Early life ==
Gupta graduated in law from Symbiosis law college, Pune, in 2003. Later he completed his diploma in taxation law from the same. After completing his education & working for multiple firms, Gupta joined senior lawyer and former union law minister, Ram Jethmalani as his chamber assistant in 2006.

== Cases ==
Saurabh is known for handling following cases.

- Indian coal allocation scam: Saurabh Gupta has been handling the disputes of steel, power & mining company, Jindal Steel & Power in respect of mining and transportation at Sarda Mines, Odisha. He is also the representative of the former member of parliament Naveen Jindal & Jindal Steel & Power in the prevention of corruption & prevention of money laundering act matters.
- Asaram Bapu Sexual Harassment Case: He represented Indian godman (guru) when he moved supreme court for early hearing of bail plea in 2017

Other cases

- Case for alleged involvement in the Parliament attack case.
- A case against an accused in the Ketan Parekh stock scam.
- Allocation of the spectrum to the telecom operators in India.
- Famous Murder of Jessica Lal.
- Sohrabbudin fake encounter case.
- Gujarat Riots Case Best Bakery Case.
- Disproportionate cases of Y. S. Jaganmohan Reddy.
