= Army Public School, Hisar =

Public school in Haryana, India

Army Public School
- Hisar Military Station, Hisar-125006; India

Information
- School type: Public school
- Motto: Truth is God
- Founded: 14 September 1990
- Principal: Dr Kavita Jakhar
- Faculty: 1220
- Age: 5 to 18
- Enrollment: 2367
- Houses: Mother Teresa, Gandhi, Sarojini, Tagore.
- Colours: Red, yellow, green, blue
- Mascot: Goddess Sarasvati
- Affiliation: CBSE
- Website: www.apshisar.com

Army Public School is an English medium, co-educational day school situated at Hisar Military Station in Hisar in the Indian state of Haryana. The school principal is Kavita Jakhar, serving since 2008.

== Notable alumni ==
- Ravi Kumar Punia – Football player

== History ==
The school was established as Army school on 14 September 1990 with 250 pupils in six classes from I to VI. The school was then upgraded to Senior Secondary School, consisting of science and commerce streams from the academic session 1994–95. It was rechristened as Army Public School in 2008. The school is affiliated to the CBSE board and has 2367 pupils distributed in 63 sections and 122 staff.

Currently the school is divided in two wings:

- Junior Wing (Classes I to V)
- Senior Wing (Classes VI to XII)

== Houses ==
The students in the school are divided into four houses:

Houses
Red	Mother Teresa
Yellow	Gandhi
Green	Sarojini
Blue	Tagore

== Facilities ==
=== Audio - visual rooms ===
School has got the facility of VSAT for live interactive telecast of lectures on science(physics, chemistry and biology), maths, and languages for classes IX-XII. It has 07 Audio Visual Classrooms (AV Rooms) for E-learning, installed with multi-media projectors and PCs connected with server on LAN.

=== Sports and extra-curricular activities ===
Games & sports have been made an integral part of school curriculum. In collaboration with Indian Army, the school has facilities for students and staff consisting of playgrounds for various sports and games. School has an obstacle course field consisting of ten commando obstacles in an organised manner for psychomotor learning of children.

The school has a spacious auditorium, a library, three basketball courts, a football field, a volleyball court, a cricket pitch and table tennis facilities.

Inter-house competitions are organized for students and they represent school in various CBSE cluster, district, zonal, state and national tournaments. Players like Ravi Kumar Punia has been selected at the national level. Apart from sports, there are regular competitions amongst students in a variety of disciplines such as debating, quizzing, elocution, dramatics, dance, music, home science, arts and fine arts.

=== School magazine ===
The school releases a well-themed almanac every year named Arushi.

== See also ==
- List of schools in Hisar
- List of universities and colleges in Hisar
- List of institutions of higher education in Haryana
- School song- "Hamari Jaan Hai, Hamari Shaan Hai, Hamara Maan Hai- Army Public School"
