= Agroha (town) =

- Town
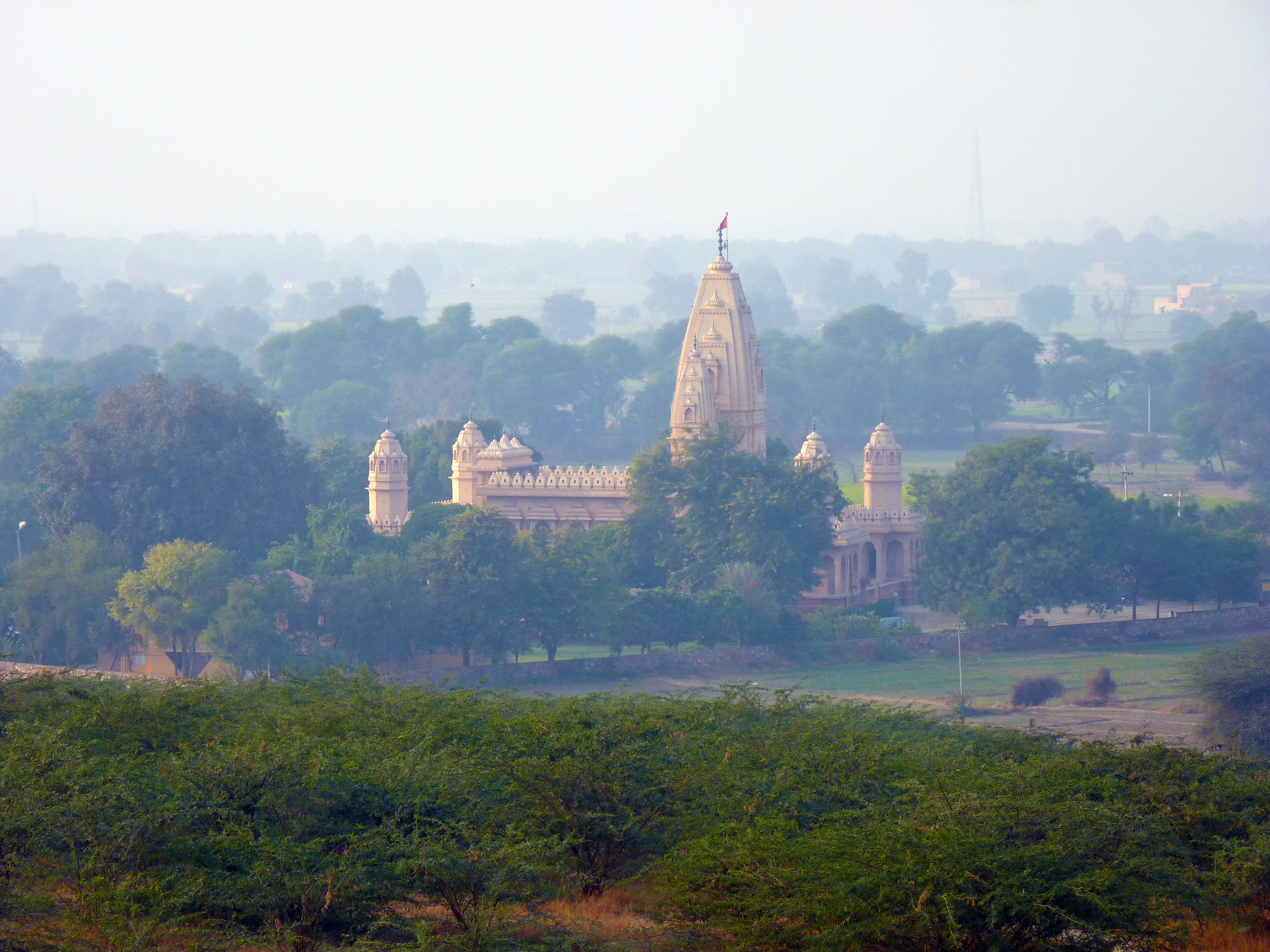
- Aerial view of Agroha town

- Location within Haryana Location within India
- Coordinates: 29.33°N 75.63°E
- Country: India
- State: Haryana
- District: Hisar
- Founder: Maharaja Agrasen

Population
  - Total: 7,722

Languages
  - Official: Hindi, English
  - Regional: Bagri, Haryanavi,
- Time zone: UTC+5:30 (IST)
- Postal code: 125047
- Vehicle registration: HR
- Website: haryana.gov.in

Agroha is a town near Hisar city, Hisar district in Haryana state of northern India, between Hisar city and Fatehabad on NH 09. Ancient structures, pot-shards, coins and seals have been found in archaeological excavations at the Agroha Mound.

== History ==
=== Early history ===
Excavation at Agroha turned up numerous coins, mostly rectangular in shape, bearing the inscription "Agodaka Agācha Janapadasa". In a separate pottery vase in the same pit were four silver Indo-Greek coins, each of a different ruler (Antialcidas, Apollodotus [either I or II], Strato [either I, II, or III], and Amyntas Nicator), which helps date the whole hoard to approximately the 2nd century BCE. The inscriptions on the rectangular coins indicate that Agroha was known as Agodaka at around that time. (Note: Srivastava also spells the name Agrodaka, but the coins themselves invariably spell the name Agodaka.)

=== Mughal era ===
Agroha is listed in the 16th century CE Ain-i-Akbari as a pargana under Hisar sarkar, producing a revenue of 1,743,970 dams for the imperial treasury and supplying a force of 2000 infantry and 200 cavalry. It appears with the note "Game of all kind abounds. Sport chiefly hawking."

== Demographics ==
As of 2011 India census, Agroha had a population of 7722 in 1491 households. Males (4068) constitute 52.68% of the population and females (3654) 47.31%. Agroha has an average literacy (4522) rate of 58.55%, less than the national average of 74%: male literacy (2659) is 58.8%, and female literacy (1863) is 41.19%. In Agroha, 13.71% of the population is under 6 years of age (1059).

== Education ==
- Maharaja Agrasen Medical College, Agroha on NH9
- Government College, Agroha on NH9
- Aadhar College of Special Education on NH9
- Shanti Niketan College Of Education Agroha on Agroha-Adampur Road

== Economy ==
Economy of Agroha subdivision largely depends on agriculture, also augmented by medical and healthcare (due to medical college), power generation (due to the large NPCIL township), religious and cultural tourism (due to Agroha Dham and Agroha Mound), education, and other services.

== Transport ==
- Airport: Maharaja Agrasen International Airport 20 km south of Agroha at Hisar is the nearest airport.
- Highways: NH9 through Agroha connects to Sirsa in northwest and Hisar-Delhi in southeast, and SH10 connects it to Adampur and Nohar in the west and Barwala in east and Chandigarh in northeast.
- Railway: Nearest major railway station is Hisar Junction railway station 20 km south of Agroha and nearest minor station is Mandi Adampur railway station 18 km west. Hisar-Agroha-Fatehabad-Sirsa line, with station at Agroha, has been approved but construction has not commenced.

== Development plan ==
In 2023, a plan submitted by the Agarwal community to the Chief Minister of Haryana for the development of "Agroha Global City" in the 25 km radius by establishing 18 residential sectors named after 18 gotras of Agarwal community, construction of world's largest statue of Maharaja Agrasen, AYUSH Hospital, a university, ashrams and dharamshalas for pilgrims, modern busport, and railway station, etc. The development will be done by the agrawal community and the role of government will be limited to providing the legal approvals and helping the land acquisition.

== Notable residents ==
- Geetika Jakhar, wrestler
- Krishna Poonia discus athlete

== See also ==
- Agrasen ki Baoli
- Agroha Dham
- Agroha Mound
