= List of schools in Hisar =

This is a list of schools in Hisar (previously spelled Hissar), in Hisar district in the state of Haryana in northwestern India.

== Schools ==
The following is an incomplete list of schools in Hisar, India.

- Aryan Public School, Agroha
- Arya High School, Kalirawan Hisar est. 1996
- Modern Defence School, Hisar
- Vidya Bharti Public School, Hisar
- Indus Public School, Hisar, Sector 16–17 run by the Indus Group of Institutions
- Army Public School, Hisar est. 1990
- Campus School CCS HAU, Hisar est. 1971
- Chhaju Ram Jat Senior Secondary School, Hisar
- Chhaju Ram Public School, Hisar
- Government High School, Hisar
- Government Girls High School, Hisar* Govt. School, Kanwari
- Govt. Girls School, Kanwari
- I. D. D. A. V. public school, sector 14
- Kendriya Vidyalaya, Military Station, Hisar est. 1984
- K. L. Arya DAV Public School
- St. Kabir's School, Dabra Road, est. 1984
- St. Mary's School, Tosham Road, Hisar
- Siddharth International School, Tosham Road, Hisar
- St. Sophia Senior Secondary School
- Thakur Dass Bhargava Senior Secondary Model School est. 1963
- Ved Senior Secondary School, Hisar, gali no 4, Jawahar Nagar
- Vidya Devi Jindal School est. 1984
- New Yashoda Public School, UE-II, Hisar est. 1986
- Sharda public high school, Dabra chowk, near railway Fatak, Hisar est.1987
- O.P. Jindal Modern School, Industrial Area, Hisar
- The Aryan School, Hisar
- St. Francis Xavier School est. 1991

== See also ==
- Haryana Board of School Education
- State Counselling Board, Haryana
- List of institutions of higher education in Haryana
- List of universities and colleges in Hisar
- Rajiv Gandhi Education City
- Kurukshetra University
- List of colleges affiliated to Kurukshetra University, Kurukshetra
- List of agricultural universities in India
- List of deemed universities
- List of universities in India
- Department of Elementary Education, Haryana
- Director Secondary Education, Haryana
- Department of Higher Education, Haryana
- Department of School Education, Haryana
