= Indus Public School, Hisar =

Indus RPS Public School, Hisar

Location
- 215, Sector 16, Hisar, Haryana; India
- Coordinates: 29.1327086°N 75.729519°E

Information
- Motto: “Vidya Dedati Vinayam”
- Category: school
- Principal: Neelam Rathi
- Website: https://www.ipshisar.edu.in/

Indus RPS Public School, Hisar is a non-profit day-boarding school in Sector 16–17, Civil Line Police Station Rd, Hisar, Haryana, India.

== History ==
School was founded by Industrialist and Philanthropist (late) Chaudhary Sri. Mitter Sen Sindhu in 2002 under Sindhu Education Foundation that runs several educational trusts and institutes under Indus Group of Institutions and Param Mitra Manav Nirman Sansthan.

Late Ch. Mitter Sen Sindhu founded The Indus Education and Research Centre (IERC), Jind during the year 2002. The IERC, a non – profit making trust mainly aims at imparting quality education through a nationwide network of public schools.

== Description ==
The school is affiliated with Delhi Public School Society (one of the largest institutions providing education at school level in India) and Central Board of Secondary Education, New Delhi (CBSE). The school has well-equipped laboratories, libraries, computer rooms, classrooms, sports facilities, music room, medical treatment room, and school transport.

== See also ==
- Capt. Rudra Sen Sindhu - Chairman of Sindhu Education Foundation
- Dr. Ekta Sindhu - chairman of Indus Group of Institutions
- Ms Neelam Rathi - Principal Indus RPS Public School, Hisar
- Indus Group of Institutions - owned by the Sindhu Education Foundation
- Param Mitra Manav Nirman Sansthan - owned by the Sindhu Education Foundation
- Education in India
- Literacy in India
- List of universities and colleges in Hisar
- List of institutions of higher education in Haryana
