= Agroha Mound =

Archaeological site in India

- Excavated Site at Haryana State
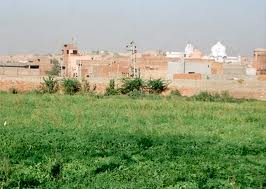
- Ther Mound

- Location in Haryana Agroha Mound (India)
- 29°19′54″N 75°37′10″E
- Type: Settlement
- Location: Agroha, Haryana, India

History
- Built: 3rd to 4th century BC
- Abandoned: 13th to 14th century AD

Site notes
- Excavation dates: 1888–1889, 1978–1979
- Archaeologists: C. J. Rogers, J. S. Khatri, Acharya

Agroha, locally known as Ther, is an archaeological site located on NH-9 in Agroha city in the Hisar district of Haryana state of India. Agroha Dham, contiguous to Agroha Dham, is located east of Maharaja Agrasen Medical College.

== History ==
=== Historical significance ===
According to the official website of Hisar, the excavations at Agroha belong to the period from the 3rd-4th century B.C. to the 13th-14th century A.D. A wall for defense, shrine cells and residential houses can be observed in the mound. The Agrawal community believes that the archaeological findings are related to their legendary founder—Maharaja Agrasena, whose capital is said to have been at Agroha. Agrawal organizations such as Akhil Bharatiya Agrawal Sammelan and Agroha Vikas Trust have supported archaeological research at the site.

Agroha, associated with legendary king Maharaja Agrasen and Agreya republic mentioned in Mahabharata, also by Panini in the Ashtadhyayi, Ptolemy who called it Agara, located on the ancient Taxila-Mathura trade route, was an important centre of commerce and political activities till the period of Firoz Shah Tughlaq in the 14th century. Bharatendu Harishchandra writes that Maharaja Agrasen, contemporaneous to Lord Krishna, was a Suryavanshi Kshatriya king born in the late Dwapar Yuga during Mahabharata era. Agroha mound was proscribed as the protected site of national importance in 1926, and excavation has proven the continuous habitation and fortified township from 4th century BCE to the 14th century CE.

In 1194, Muhammad of Ghor destroyed Agroha and inhabitants relocated to other places.

Ziauddin Barani (1285–1357) writer of Delhi Sultanate and Shams-i Siraj 'Afif (court historian of Firuz Shah Tughlaq, r. 1351–1388 CE) describe this as prominent city till the time of Muhammad bin Tughluq (r. 1325-1351 CE) when famine struck and the remaining inhabitants of the town left for elsewhere (the town had already been reduced in size by Ghori in 1194). Subsequently, Feroz Shah Tughluq used the material from Hindu, Buddhist and Jain temples of Agroha Mound to build the Firoz Shah palace complex (1354-1357 CE). Traveller Ibn Battuta (travelled to India from 1333 to 1345 CE), found Agroha deserted.

In 1907, sadhu Brahmananda Brahmachari visited Agroha and in 1908 organised the Agrawal Darbar group under which a Shiva temple, Sati shrines and a gaushala were constructed.

In 1976, the All India Aggarwal Convention (AIAC) formed the Agroha Vikas Trust (English Agroha Development Trust) under the AIAC President Rameshwar Das Gupta (not to be confused with Rameshwar Das Birla of Birla family) and Krishan Kumar Modi of Modi Enterprises to which Laxmi Narayan Gupta donated 5 acre land on which Arogha Dham temple complex was constructed under the supervision of Subhash Goel (not to be confused with Subhash Chandra of Zee and Essel Group). Subhash Chandra of Zee and Essel Group, a former Member of Parliament, is a patron of the Agroha Development Trust.

In 2023, the comprehensive Agroha development plan was announced.

=== Excavation history ===
In 1888–89, the brief 15 day first excavation by Archaeological Survey of India (ASI) was undertaken under C.J. Rogers.

In 1938-39, archaeologist HL Srivastava's carried out more excavations to the depth of 12 ft.

From 1978–79 to 1980-81, the Archaeological Department of Haryana and ASI under the supervision of J.S. Khatri and Acharya conducted excavation till the depth of approximately 3.65 metres. for 3 consecutive years.

In 2024 March, a Ground Penetrating Radar (GPR) survey was conducted by IIT Kanpur.

In 2025, from 12 March to 31 May, ASI conducted excavation in 8 square trenches of 10 sq ft revealing artifacts belonging to Gurjar-Pratihar period from 8th century CE to 11th century CE. 11:32 am IST

== The mound ==
=== Location ===
The 125 acre mound is 1.5 km east centre of Agroha town, 20 km from Hisar city and 190 km from New Delhi in Hisar district of Haryana. It lies on National Highway 9 (old NH-10).

=== Notable finds ===
Fortified township, residential and community houses of baked and unbaked bricks, Buddhist stupa and a Hindu temple were found in the excavation. Excavations prior to 2024, yielded over seven thousand artefacts.

1888-89 excavation found solid brick structures, paved paths, ashes, coins, beads, terracotta, and sculpture fragments, establishing Agroha as an ancient fortified city with its own coinage (Agrodaka) and connecting it to the Agrawal community.

1938-39 excavations by HL Srivastava's revealed more about its long history from 4th Century BCE to 14th Century CE, when he found a hoard of silver coins, including four Indo-Greek, one punch-marked, and another 51 coins stamped as Agrodaka (name of Agroha).

1978-79 to 1980-81 excavation produced the evidence of a Buddhist stupa and a Hindu temple.

2025 excavations revealed artifacts belonging to Gurjar-Pratihar period from 8th century CE to 11th century CE.

==== Coins ====
Silver and bronze coins belonging to different periods have been found at the site. The coins hoard includes four Indo-Greek coins, one punch-marked coin, and fifty-one coins of Agrodaka. They belong to Roman, Kushana, Yaudheya and Gupta Empire. Language used is Prakrit.

==== Seals ====
Many seals have also been found. They are inscribed with words like Pitradutt, " Sadhu Vridhasya", "Shamkar Malasya", "Madrsya", etc.

==== Other artifacts ====
Besides the numerous stone sculptures, iron and copper implements and beads of semi-precious stones have also been found.

Copper finds from 1938 to 1939 include a sword, spoon, chain, bangle, ear ornament, a disc, etc. Same excavation also found stone sculptures showing signs of being burnt proving plunder and severe destruction by Muslims.

== Development plan ==
The development plan for Agroha envisages constructing a site museum with a planetarium, tourist centre, and a knowledge park to educate visitors about its historical significance. In 2023, Government of Haryana allotted land for a site museum adjacent to the mound and in 2024, Haryana government and ASI signed a memorandum of understanding to develop Agroha as a prominent heritage site along the lines of Rakhigarhi as part of the wider tourism circuit in Hisar district. In August 2025, during the review meeting on the progress of Agroha Development Plan, the Chief Minister of Haryana, Nayab Singh Saini, instructed Hisar-Agroha Metropolitan Development Authority (HAMDA) to prepare a comprehensive master plan for Agroha as a global city within a 25 km radius, and tourist circuit development strategy.

Agroha Global City: In 2023, a plan submitted by the Agarwal community to the Chief Minister of Haryana for the development of "Agroha Global City" in the 25 km radius by establishing 18 residential sectors named after 18 gotras of Agarwal community, etc. The development will be done by the agrawal community and the role of government will be limited to providing the legal approvals and helping the land acquisition.

Modern infrastructure: Proposals for a National Ayush Medical Centre, a university, ashrams, dharamshalas (rest houses), a modern bus port, and a state-of-the-art Agroha railway station.

Agroha Mound Archaeological Park and Indus Saraswati civilisation tourism circuit: Agroha, along with Rakhigarhi, Banawali, Bhirdana, Kunal, Hisar, and other Indus Saraswati civilisation sites will be developed as an integrated global tourism circuit.

Agroha Dham Religious and Cultural Complex: Ongoing expansion including new 100 crore 108 ft tall Adya Mahalaxmi temple.

Maharaja Agrasen statue: world's largest statue of Maharaja Agrasen will be constructed.

Agrasen Mahalaxmi temples and sanatan cultural centres across the world: series of large temples across each district of India and all countries of the world under Agroha Trust along the line of Tirumala Tirupati Devasthanams.

== See also ==
- Archaeological
  - List of Monuments of National Importance in Haryana
  - List of State Protected Monuments in Haryana
  - List of Indus Valley civilization sites
- Buddhist pilgrimage sites
  - Buddhist pilgrimage sites in Haryana
  - Buddhist pilgrimage sites in India
- Ecology
  - List of protected areas of Haryana
- Tourism in Haryana
