= Karontha =

Village in Haryana, India

Karontha (Karountha) is a village in Rohtak mandal of the Rohtak district, in the Indian state of Haryana. It is on Rohtak Jhajjar road. It is a village of Dhankhar Jats.

== Demographics ==
As of 2011 India census, Karountha had a population of 5802 in 1139 households. Males (3159) constitute 54.44% of the population and females (2643) 45.55%.

== Villages nearby ==
- Dighal
- Karor
- Simli
- Bhambhewa
