= Hisar district =

Coordinates: 29.1667°N 75.7167°E

- District of Haryana
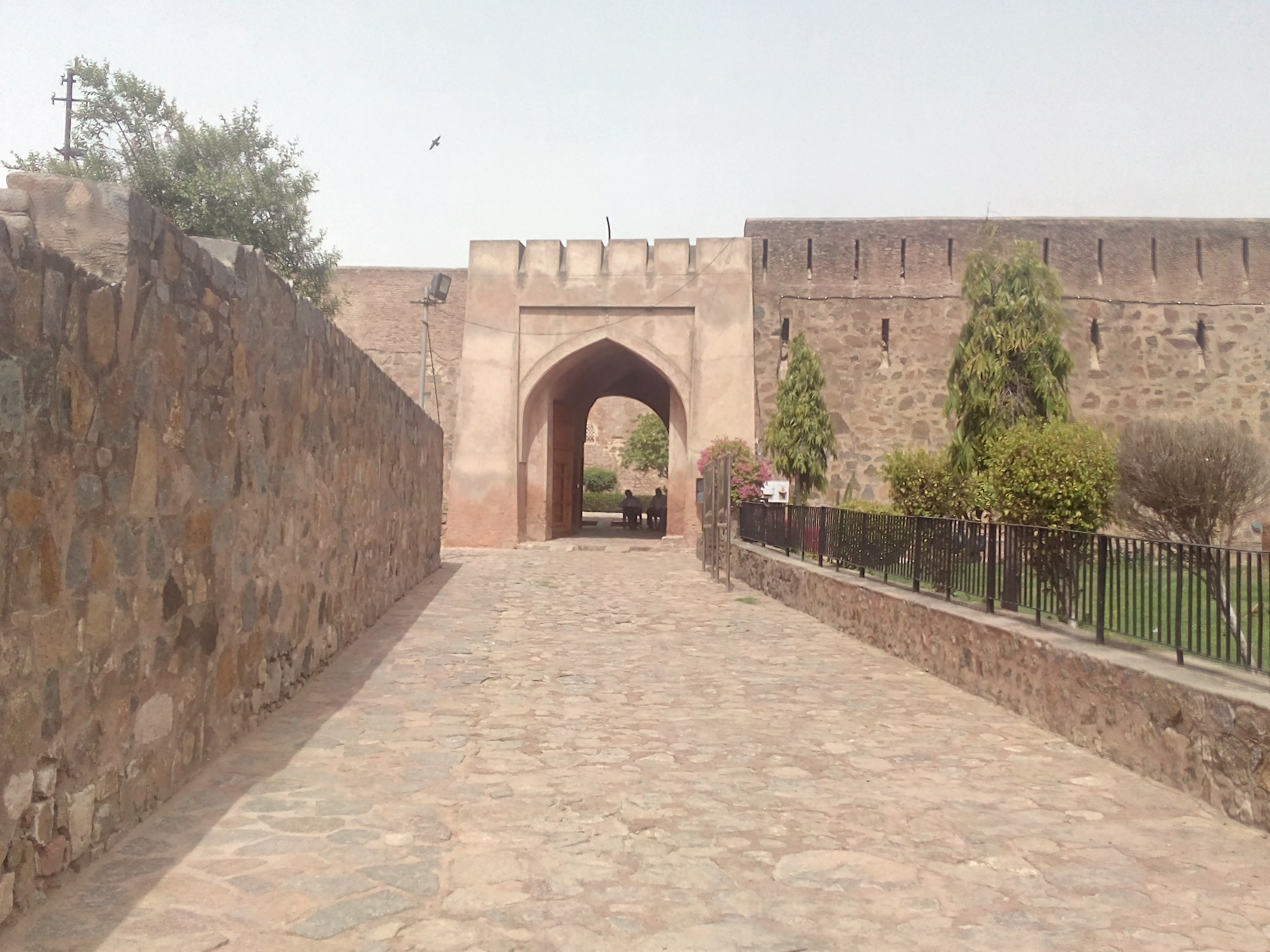
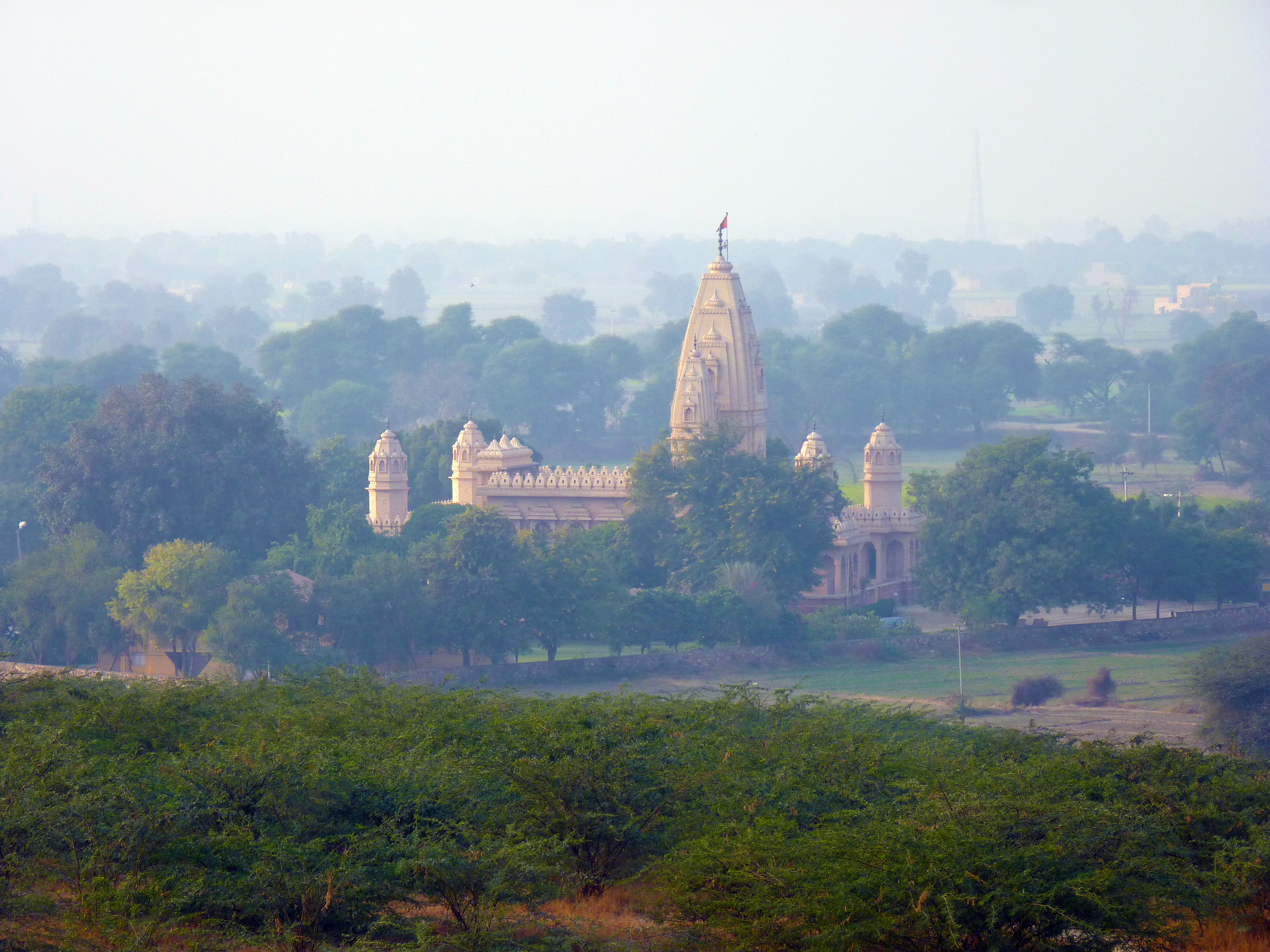
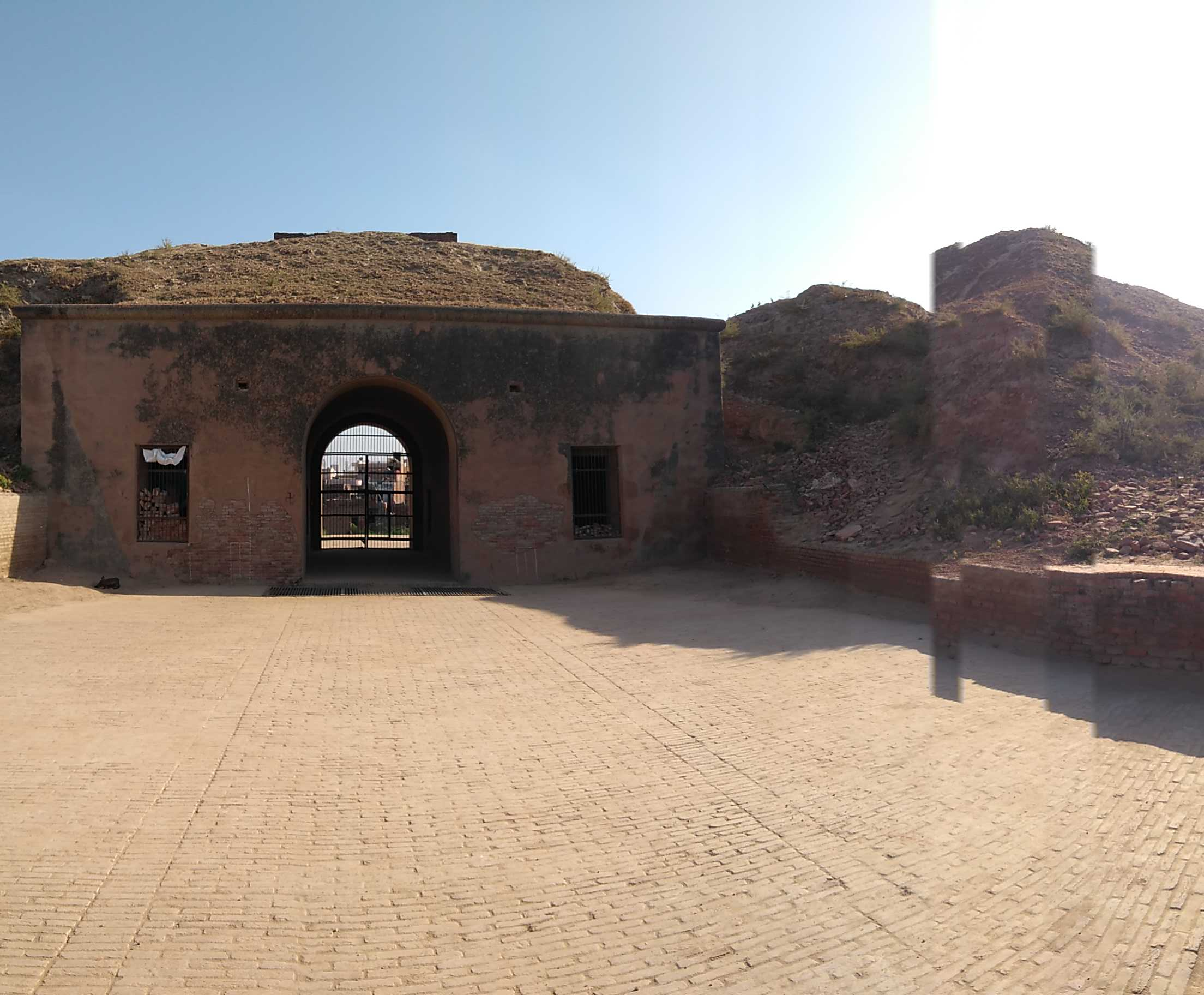
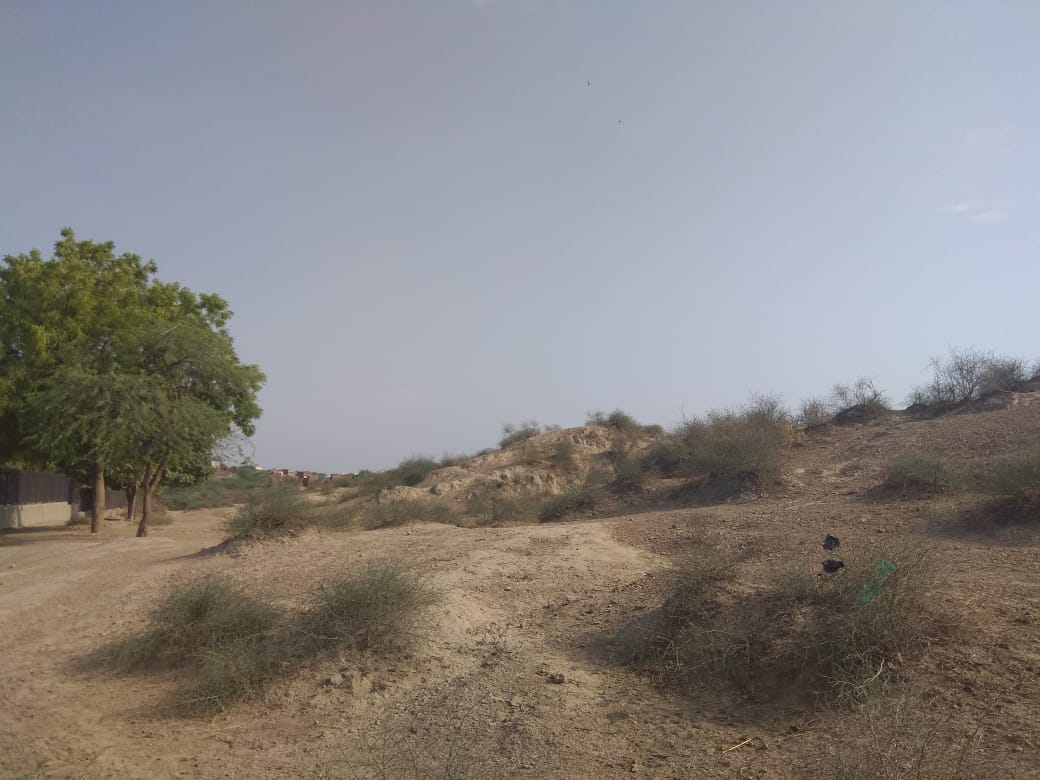
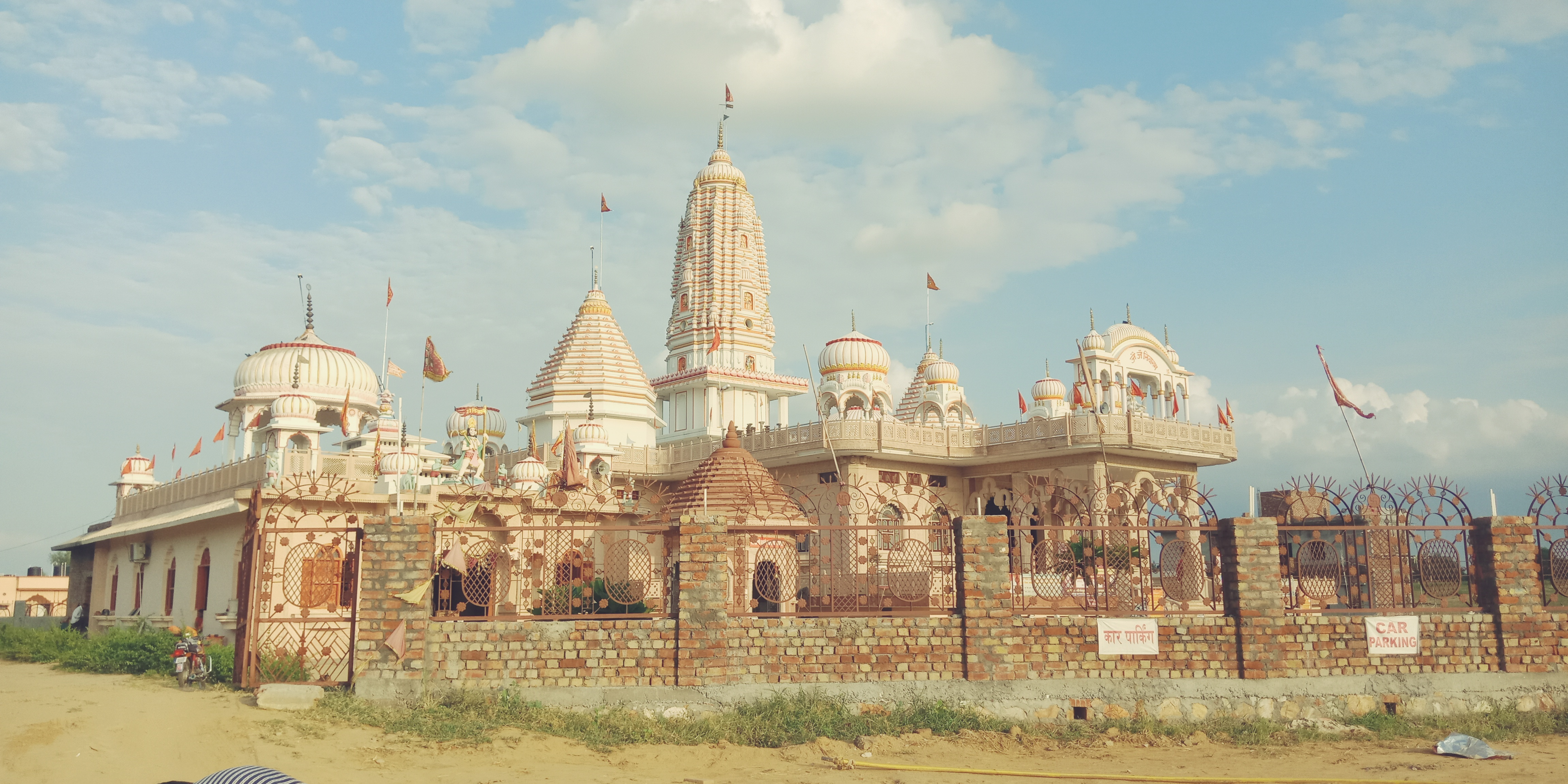
- Clockwise from top-left: Palace of Firoz Shah, Sheela Mata Temple in Agroha, mounds at Rakhigarhi, Balaji Mandir at Hisar, Asigarh Fort

- Location in Haryana
- Country: India
- State: Haryana
- Division: Hisar
- Established: 1815
- Headquarters: Hisar (city)
- Tehsils: Adampur, Agroha, Barwala, Hisar, Balsamand, Bass, Narnaund and Uklanamandi

Government
  - Deputy Commissioner: Uttam Singh, IAS

Area
  - Total: 3,983 km^{2} (1,538 sq mi)

Population (2011)
  - Total: 1,743,931
  - Density: 438/km^{2} (1,130/sq mi)

Demographics
  - Literacy: 64.83%

Languages
  - Official: Hindi
  - Additional official: English; Punjabi
  - Regional: Haryanvi
- Time zone: UTC+05:30 (IST)
- Major highways: NH-9 (formerly NH-10) and NH-52 (formerly NH-65)
- Lok Sabha constituencies: Hisar
- Website: hisar.nic.in

Hisar district is one of the 23

districts of Haryana, India. Hisar city serves as the district headquarters. Hisar district has two sub-divisions: Hisar and Barwala each headed by a sub-divisional magistrate (SDM). The district is also part of Hisar division. Hisar was founded by Firuz Shah Tughlaq.

As the largest district in Haryana until its 1966 reorganisation, some parts of Hisar were transferred to the newly created Jind district. In 1974, the Tehsils of Bhiwani and Loharu were transferred to Bhiwani district. Hisar was further shrunk when Sirsa district was formed. Fatehabad district and Hansi district were later created as well.

Hisar city is the divisional headquarters of the Hisar division and also the headquarters of Police Range. It is also the battalion headquarters of B.S.F. 3rd Bn. H.A.P. and commando force. In order to accommodate all of these departments, a five-storey District Administrative Complex was built, with the offices transferred in 1980. It adjoins the new Judiciary Complex, which is also made functional. This administrative and judiciary complex is the largest in Haryana; as a district headquarters it may be one of the largest in the country.

It is one of five cities belonging to the Indus Valley Civilisation, its name is cited in the history books in the context of Indus civilisation and in general knowledge books as the location of Banawali, one of five sheep farms. As of 2011, it is the second most populous of the 21 districts of Haryana, after Faridabad.

Hisar city is also known as the steel city because of the Jindal Stainless Steel Factories. It is also the largest producer of galvanised iron in India.

== Geography and irrigation ==
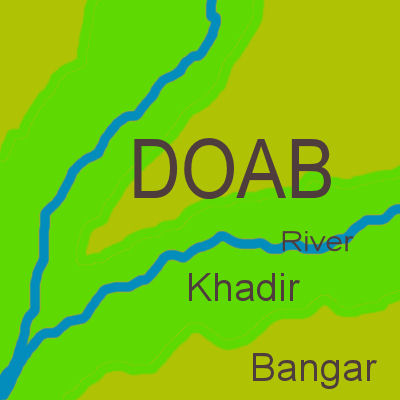
In any doab, khadar land (green) lies next to a river, while bangar land (olive) has greater elevation and lies further from the river

The northern parts of Hisar district are in a doab between the Ghagghar river, which flows through the Fatehabad district and the palaeochannel of the Dhrishadvati river flowing through the Narnaul tehsil. Eastern, central, and south-eastern Hisar district is in a doab between the Dhrishadvati and Yamuna rivers. Western Hisar district is part of Bagar tract. The doab regions near the rivers consist of low-lying, flood-prone, but usually very fertile khadir, while the higher-lying land away from the rivers is called bangar, is less prone to flooding but also less fertile on average. For the purpose of irrigation, the Hisar district has been classified into 5 circles, namely barani (dry areas where rain-fed dry farming is practised, which are nowadays dependent on tube wells for irrigation), bagar (dry sandy tract of land on the border of Rajasthan state adjoining the states of Haryana and Punjab) nahri (canal-irrigated land), nali or naili (fertile prairie tract between the Ghaggar river and the southern limits of the Saraswati channel depression in northern Hissar district of Haryana that gets flooded during the rains), and Rangoi tract (an area irrigated by the Rangoi canal made for the purpose of carrying flood waters of Ghagghar river to dry areas).

Hisar has fertile alluvial soil interspersed with highly permeable very sandy tracts in bagar region several with water table more than 100 feet below ground containing brackish water usually unfit for human consumption, where dust storms frequent during the warm summer months from April till the end of July when monsoon arrives. Previously, Hisar was solely based on the rain and irrigation was possible only in the nali region where the season Ghaggar river flows in North Hisar. After the opening of Bhakra Nangal Dam canal system in 1963 as well as the earlier Western Yamuna Canal now irrigate most of Haryana including all of the Bagar region falling in Haryana on its western border. Opening of Indira Gandhi Canal in 1983 (specially Hansi Butana branches) brought the water of Sutlej and Beas rivers to the fields of Rajasthan including its Bagar tract stabilising the sand dunes and soil erosion by preventing the expansion of desert.

=== Climate ===
Hisar

Climate chart (precipitation, max. and min. temperature)
J	F	M	A	M	J	J	A	S	O	N	D
13 6 6	16 8 8	12 31 14	5.6 37 19	20 41 24	43 50 28	141 48 27	147 35 26	65 35 24	15 34 18	6.1 29 11	7.3 24 7
- █ Average max. and min. temperatures in °C
- █ Precipitation totals in mm
- Source: IMD
Imperial conversion
J	F	M	A	M	J	J	A	S	O	N	D
0.5 44 42	0.6 46 47	0.5 87 57	0.2 98 67	0.8 105 76	1.7 122 82	5.5 118 81	5.8 95 79	2.6 96 75	0.6 94 64	0.2 84 52	0.3 74 44
- █ Average max. and min. temperatures in °F
- █ Precipitation totals in inches

Hisar has a warm climate.

== History ==
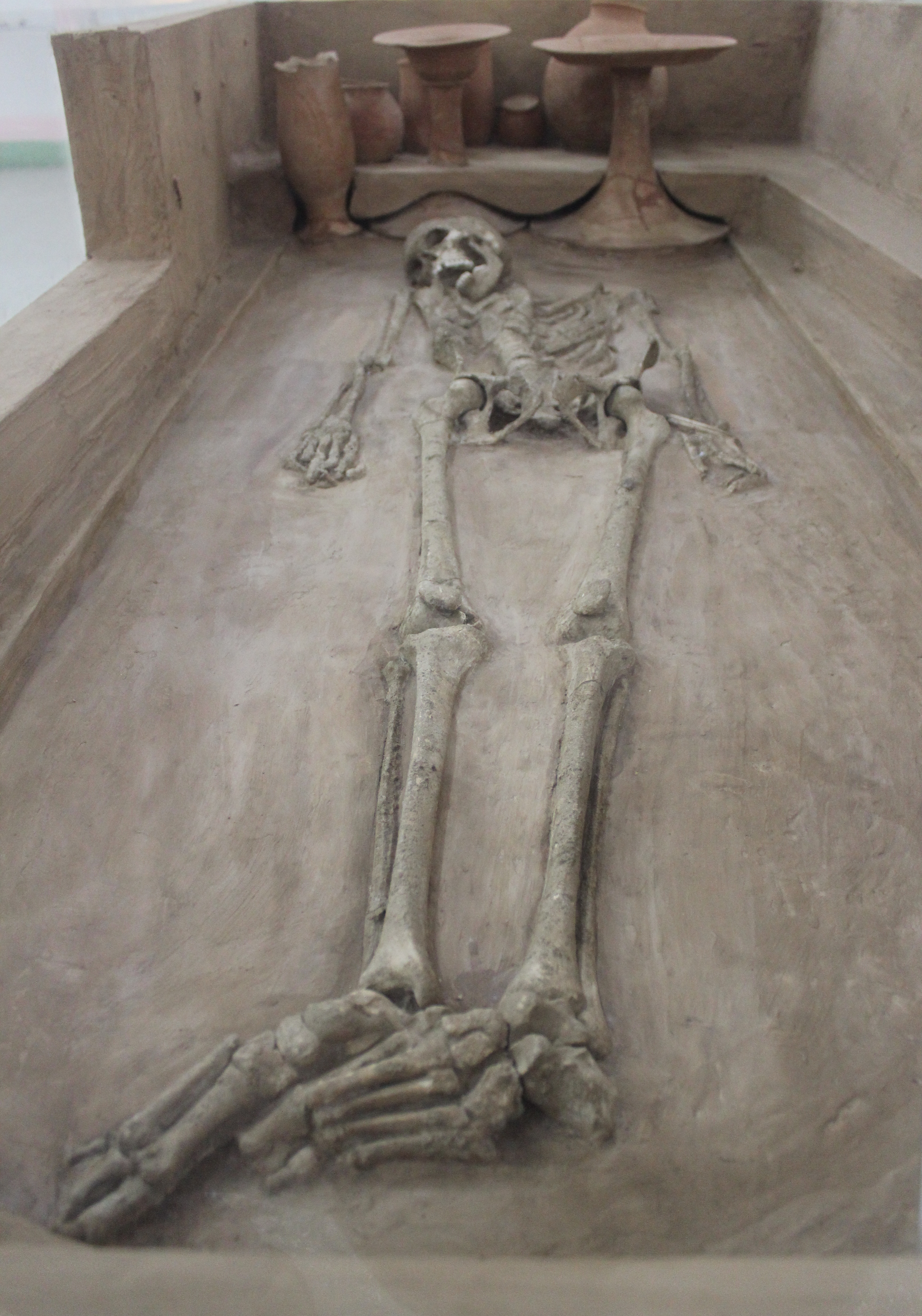
A skeleton from Rakhigarhi, Indus Valley Civilisation site in Hisar on display in the National Museum, New Delhi.

The district suffered from the Chalisa famine in 1783-84, as well as other famines in 1838, 1860-61, 1896-97 and 1899-1900.

Hisar district was conquered by the British in 1803. On 30 December 1803, Daulat Rao Sindhia signed the Treaty of Surji-Anjangaon with the British after the Battle of Assaye and Battle of Laswari and ceded Hisar, Panipat, Rohtak, Rewari, Gurgaon, Ganges-Jumna Doab, the Delhi-Agra region, parts of Bundelkhand, Broach, some districts of Gujarat and the fort of Ahmmadnagar to the British.

On 1 November 1966, when Punjab was reorganised and Haryana became a separate state, Hisar was already an existing district of the newly formed state of Haryana.

== Demographics ==
Historical population
Year	Pop.	±% p.a.
1951	423,390	—
1961	577,887	+3.16%
1971	774,265	+2.97%
1981	985,769	+2.44%
1991	1,209,238	+2.06%
2001	1,537,117	+2.43%
2011	1,743,931	+1.27%

As of the 2011 census, the district had a population of 1,743,931, roughly equal to the population of The Gambia or the US state of Nebraska. This gave it a ranking of the 276th most populous state in India out of a total of 640 districts. The district has a population density of 438 inhabitants per square kilometre (1,130/sq mi) . Its population growth rate over the decade 2001-2011 was 13.38%. Hisar has a sex ratio of 871 females for every 1000 males, and a literacy rate of 73.2%. Scheduled Castes make up 23.44% of the population.

=== Castes and tribes ===
The main social groups in the district are Jats, Bishnois, Brahmins, Sainis, Banias, Gujjars, Ahirs, Rajputs, Kumhars, Aroras, Chamars and Balmikis. Jat is the largest social group in the city. Bishnois have migrated from Rajasthan. There are three sections of Brahmins in the district, i.e., Gaur, Bias and Khandelwal. Most of the Aroras are migrant from West Punjab after the partition of the country in 1947. Banias are divided into Aggarwals, Oswals and Maheshwaris. The Aggarwals are said to be the descendants of the inhabitants of Agroha. They hold Agroha in great reverence., The Gujjars of HisarOswals and Maheshwaris trace their origin to Rajasthan. Hisar is also the origin place of Agrawal Jain Community, with Hansi being an important Jain pilgrimage town.

=== Languages ===
Languages of Hisar district (2011)
1. Haryanvi (68.8%)
2. Hindi (26.4%)
3. Punjabi (2.41%)
4. Others (2.43%)

At the time of the 2011 Census of India, 68.76% of the population in the district spoke Haryanvi, 26.40% Hindi and 2.41% Punjabi as their first language. Haryanvi is the most spoken language in the district.

=== Religion ===
Religion in Hisar district (2011)
Religion	Percent
Hinduism	97.54%
Islam	1.24%
Sikhism	0.70%
Other or not stated	0.52%

Hisar is 98% Hindu, only about 40,000 are Muslims, rest are mostly Jain and Sikhs. Nearly all Muslims of Hisar left for Pakistan during the Partition.

Religion in Hisar District
Religious group	2011	
Religious group	Pop.	%
Hinduism	1,701,061	97.54%
Islam	21,650	1.24%
Sikhism	12,270	0.7%
Christianity	1,945	0.11%
Others	7,005	0.4%
Total Population	1,743,931	100%

Religious groups in Hisar district (British Punjab province era)
Religious group	1881		1891		1901		1911		1921		1931		1941	
Religious group	Pop.	%	Pop.	%	Pop.	%	Pop.	%	Pop.	%	Pop.	%	Pop.	%
Hinduism (Note: 1931-1941: Including Ad-Dharmis)	514,948	67.98%	548,896	70.73%	544,799	69.69%	541,720	67.3%	548,351	67.13%	583,429	64.86%	652,842	64.85%
Islam	206,806	27.3%	199,010	25.65%	202,009	25.84%	218,600	27.16%	215,943	26.44%	253,784	28.21%	285,208	28.33%
Sikhism	31,446	4.15%	22,151	2.85%	28,642	3.66%	38,508	4.78%	45,615	5.58%	55,169	6.13%	60,731	6.03%
Jainism	4,186	0.55%	5,690	0.73%	6,003	0.77%	5,767	0.72%	5,874	0.72%	5,988	0.67%	6,126	0.61%
Christianity	72	0.01%	242	0.03%	253	0.03%	273	0.03%	1,024	0.13%	1,107	0.12%	1,292	0.13%
Zoroastrianism	0	0%	17	0%	11	0%	10	0%	3	0%	2	0%	4	0%
Buddhism	0	0%	0	0%	0	0%	3	0%	0	0%	0	0%	0	0%
Judaism	—N/a	—N/a	0	0%	0	0%	8	0%	0	0%	0	0%	1	0%
Others	0	0%	0	0%	0	0%	0	0%	0	0%	0	0%	505	0.05%
Total population	757,458	100%	776,006	100%	781,717	100%	804,889	100%	816,810	100%	899,479	100%	1,006,709	100%
Note1: British Punjab province era district borders are not an exact match in the present-day due to various bifurcations to district borders — which since created new districts — throughout the historic Punjab Province region during the post-independence era that have taken into account population increases. Note2: 1881 census count includes Sirsa District, which was later amalgamated with Hissar District.

Religion in the Tehsils of Hisar District (1921)
Tehsil	Hinduism		Islam		Sikhism		Christianity		Jainism		Others (Note: Including Buddhism, Zoroastrianism, Judaism, Tribals, others, or not stated)		Total	
Tehsil	Pop.	%	Pop.	%	Pop.	%	Pop.	%	Pop.	%	Pop.	%	Pop.	%
Hisar Tehsil	106,179	77.92%	28,788	21.13%	214	0.16%	101	0.07%	990	0.73%	0	0%	136,272	100%
Hansi Tehsil	141,116	79.71%	33,396	18.86%	83	0.05%	34	0.02%	2,414	1.36%	0	0%	177,043	100%
Bhiwani Tehsil	104,350	82.81%	20,683	16.41%	47	0.04%	64	0.05%	871	0.69%	0	0%	126,015	100%
Fatehabad Tehsil	104,525	53.38%	71,510	36.52%	18,757	9.58%	393	0.2%	616	0.31%	0	0%	195,801	100%
Sirsa Tehsil	92,181	50.74%	61,566	33.89%	26,514	14.59%	432	0.24%	983	0.54%	3	0%	181,679	100%
Note: British Punjab province era tehsil borders are not an exact match in the present-day due to various bifurcations to tehsil borders — which since created new tehsils — throughout the historic Punjab Province region during the post-independence era that have taken into account population increases.

Religion in the Tehsils of Hisar District (1941)
Tehsil	Hinduism		Islam		Sikhism		Christianity		Jainism		Others (Note: Including Anglo-Indian Christians, British Christians, Buddhism, Zoroastrianism, Judaism, Tribals, others, or not stated)		Total	
Tehsil	Pop.	%	Pop.	%	Pop.	%	Pop.	%	Pop.	%	Pop.	%	Pop.	%
Hisar Tehsil	157,058	65.48%	64,499	26.89%	15,712	6.55%	572	0.24%	1,992	0.83%	24	0.01%	239,857	100%
Hansi Tehsil	175,761	78.34%	45,551	20.3%	165	0.07%	56	0.02%	2,836	1.26%	1	0%	224,370	100%
Bhiwani Tehsil	127,740	80.55%	29,554	18.64%	533	0.34%	169	0.11%	587	0.37%	4	0%	158,587	100%
Fatehabad Tehsil	94,122	55.53%	67,556	39.86%	7,664	4.52%	18	0.01%	124	0.07%	7	0%	169,491	100%
Sirsa Tehsil	98,161	45.78%	78,048	36.4%	36,657	17.1%	420	0.2%	587	0.27%	531	0.25%	214,404	100%
Note 1: British Punjab province era tehsil borders are not an exact match in the present-day due to various changes made to tehsil borders — which since created new tehsils — throughout the historic Punjab Province region during the post-independence era that have taken into account population increases. Note 2: Tehsil religious breakdown figures for Christianity only includes local Christians, labelled as "Indian Christians" on census. They do not include Anglo-Indian Christians or British Christians, who were classified under "Other" category.

== Administrative divisions ==
Hisar continued to be the District Headquarters of the largest District in the state until its reorganisation in 1966 when parts were carved out to create the new Jind District. The Tehsil Bhiwani and Loharu estate were later transferred to Bhiwani district on its creation in 1974. It was further bifurcated when Sirsa district was created entirely out of Hisar District. Fatehabad district has now been carved out of this district.

At present Hisar district consists of the eight tehsils of Adampur, Agroha, Barwala, Hisar, Hansi-1, Hansi-2, Narnaund and Uklanamandi, two Sub-Tehsils of Balsamand and Bass. Vehicle registration numbers for Hisar district are: Hisar HR 20 and HR 39 (commercial no), Hansi HR 21 and Barwala HR 80.

Hisar is a divisional headquarters of the Divisional Commissioner and also the headquarters of the Police Range. It is also a battalion Headquarters of Border Security Force, 3rd battalion of Haryana Armed Police and police commando force. All these departments are now housed in a five storied District Administrative Complex completed in 1980, which adjoins the new Judiciary Complex.

The district has seven Vidhan Sabha constituencies, namely, Adampur, Uklana, Narnaund, Hansi, Barwala, Hisar and Nalwa. All of these are part of Hisar Lok Sabha constituency

== Education ==
Universities

- Chaudhary Charan Singh Haryana Agricultural University, initially founded as a campus of the Punjab Agricultural University, Ludhiana.
- Guru Jambheshwar University of Science and Technology, founded in 1995, attracts students for higher education from all over the country and abroad.
- Lala Lajpat Rai University of Veterinary and Animal Sciences. A statue and memorial of Lala Lajpat Rai stands on the campus to commemorate this patriot.

Government colleges

- Govt. Post Graduate College, Hisar

Private colleges

- Dayanand college
- CRM JAT College
- Chhaju Ram Law College, Hisar
- Chhaju Ram College of Education, Hisar
- Fateh Chand College for Women (Lahore), Hisar
- Maharaja Agrasen Medical College, Agroha

Schools

Hisar also has several renowned schools including Leading Angel Public School, Hisar (LAPS), Indus Public School, Hisar (IPS), Army Public School, Hisar (APS) and Thakur Dass Bhargava Senior Secondary Model School.

== Notable individuals ==
Over the past three centuries Hisar had been the birthplace of individuals including Sardar Ishri Singh, Sardar Harji Ram and Rai Bahadur Sardar Nau Nihal Singh, who were honorary magistrates in pre-Independence Hisar. Noteworthy individuals include the Lala Lajpat Rai (freedom fighter, elected member of Hisar municipal committee, founder of Hisar district congress (1886), Arya Samaj (1886) and district bar council), Captain Abhimanyu Sindhu (entrepreneur, journalist, BJP national spokesperson and Minister in Haryana from Narnaund assembly constituency), late Dr. Gopi Chand Bhargava (First Chief Minister of joint Punjab), Om Prakash Jindal (former chairperson of Jindal Industries and Minister in Haryana government) and his wife Savitri Jindal (chairperson of Jindal Industries and Minister in Haryana government), Subhash Chandra (Chairman of Essel Group and Zee Network and BJP MP in Rajya Sabha), Amit Munjal, founder and CEO of Doctor Insta and Former CFO of Citi Holdings, Yash Tonk (Bollywood actor), Manish Joshi Bismil (theatre director), General V.K. Singh (Former Army Chief and Union Minister from BJP), General Dalbir Singh Suhag (former Army Chief), Israr Ahmed (Islamic scholar from Pakistan, born in Hisar before independence) and Justice Surya Kant (53rd Chief Justice of India).

== See also ==
- Hisar (city)
- Hisar division
- Hisar Urban Agglomeration
- Hisar (Vidhan Sabha constituency)
- Hisar (Lok Sabha constituency)
- Asigarh Fort at Hansi
- Kanwari Indus Valley Mound at Kanwari
- Tosham rock inscription
