= Amlidhodha =

- village
- Location in raigarh, Chhattisgarh, India Amlidhodha (India)
- Coordinates: 22.06°N 83.50°E
- Country: India
- State: Chhattisgarh
- District: Raigarh
- Elevation: 240 m (790 ft)

Population (2011)
  - Total: 1,000

Languages
  - Official: Hindi, Chhattisgarhi
- Time zone: UTC+5:30 (IST)
- PIN: 496107
- Vehicle registration: CG-13

Amlidhodha is a small village in the samkera post office and Tamnar Nagar Panchayat, Raigarh district in the state of Chhattisgarh, India.

== Geography and climate ==
Amlidhodha is a village 15km from Tamnar. It is the center of a forest. There is a famous temple in the Tamnar block called shiv temple this temple is on a mountain.

The village minimum-maximum temperature range is 29.5 - 45 °C in summer, and 7 - 23 °C in winter.

== Demographics ==
At the 2011 census, 1000 people lived in the village of Amlidhodha.

== Education ==
Amlidhodha's literacy rate is 65.44% (2011). Amlidhodha has one primary school on khalhrpara for children of this village. And the end of the 5th class. For middle school education, children go to other villages, such as Padigav, Mahaloi, and Samkera. Local high schools include Hamirpur Government School and Dhourabatha.

== Economy ==
Amlidhodha's economy is not developed. Most people's income comes from agriculture.

== Language ==
Amlidhodha's residents speak three languages: Hindi, Chhattisgarhi, and Oriya. The primary language is Chhattisgarhi.
