= C. Raj Kumar =

Indian academic

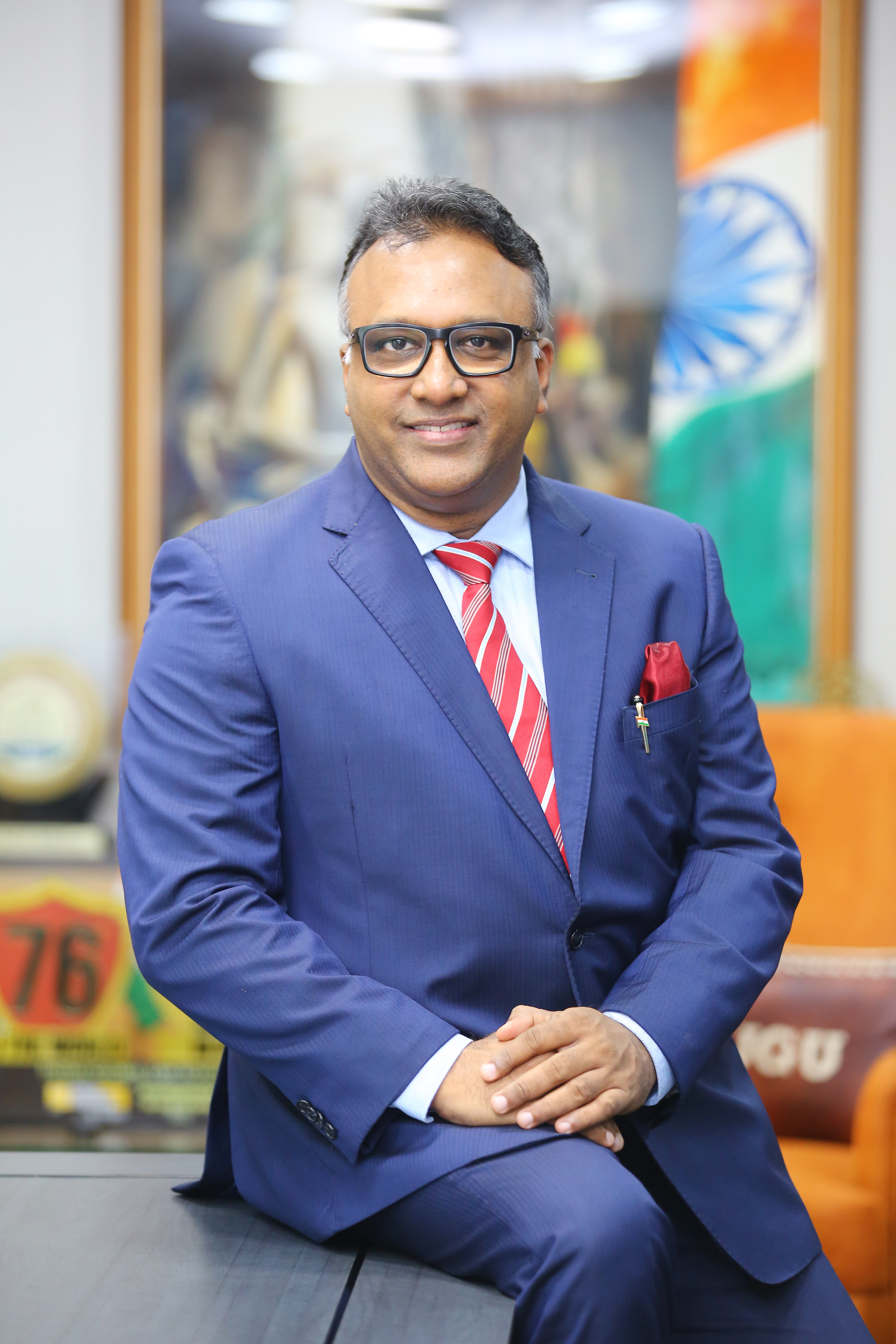
C. Raj Kumar

Chockalingam Raj Kumar is an Indian academic administrator who is the founding vice-chancellor of O.P. Jindal Global University in Sonipat, Haryana, India, and the dean of the Jindal Global Law School.

He was a faculty member at the School of Law of City University of Hong Kong. Previously, he has consulted United Nations University, Tokyo; United Nations Development Programme; and the International Council for Human Rights Policy (ICHRP), Geneva, National Human Rights Commission of India.

Kumar works in the fields of human rights and development, comparative constitutional law, terrorism and national security, corruption and governance, law and disaster management, legal education and higher education. He has nine books and over two hundred publications to his credit and has published widely in peer-reviewed journals, law reviews in Australia, Hong Kong, India, Japan, Singapore, UK and the US.

== Education and career ==
Kumar received a Rhodes Scholarship to study at University of Oxford, where he obtained his Bachelor of Civil Law degree; a Landon Gammon Fellow at the Harvard Law School, where he obtained his Master of Laws degree. He was awarded the Doctor of Legal Science by the University of Hong Kong. He also obtained a Bachelor of Laws (LL.B.) degree from the University of Delhi, India; and a Bachelor of Commerce degree from the Loyola College of the University of Madras, Chennai, India. He also was a research fellow at the NYU Law School.

He was appointed as the vice chancellor in 2009 when the university was established. Kumar conceived the idea of establishing India's first global university and with the philanthropic support (US$100 million) of Mr. Naveen Jindal, established JGU in Sonipat, Haryana, in 2009.

== Books ==
- Corruption and Human Rights in India: Comparative Perspectives on Transparency and Good Governance (2011), published by the Oxford University Press
- Legal Education and Legal Profession During and After COVID-19, (2022), Singapore, Springer.
- Global Higher Education during and beyond COVID-19: Perspectives and Challenges (2022), New Delhi, Springer.
- The Future of Indian Universities: Comparative and International Perspectives (2017), New Delhi, Oxford University Press.
- The Education President: Institution Building for Nation Building (2016) (Co-Author-Universal Law Publishing & LexisNexis.
- Terrorism, Human Security and Development: Human Rights Perspectives (forthcoming, 2012), to be published by the United Nations University Press, approx. 300 pages (co-editor)
- Human Rights, Justice and Constitutional Empowerment (January 2007) published by the Oxford University Press, 520 pages (authored two chapters) (co-editor).
- The President of India and The Governance of Higher Education Institutions (2016) (edited), published by Universal Law Publishing (an imprint of LexisNexis).
- Human Rights, Justice and Constitutional Empowerment (January 2007) published by the Oxford University Press
- Tsunami and Disaster Management: Law and Governance (September 2006) published by Thomson Sweet & Maxwell Asia
- Human Rights and Development: Law, Policy and Governance (July 2006) published by LexisNexis (Butterworths)

== Articles in newspapers and magazines ==
1. "Transforming India’s higher education sector”, The Indian Express, May 31, 2024.
2. "Happy Birthday Kapil Dev: Leader in Cricket, Leader in Life”, The Indian Express, January 13, 2024.
3. "Reimagine Universities to tap India’s Youth Bulge”, The Hindustan Times, January 04, 2024.
4. "Protecting Basic Structure from Judicial Arbitrariness”, The Indian Express, December 11, 2023.
5. "UGC proposal: Why India should not outsource higher education to foreign universities”, The Indian Express, January 10, 2023.
6. "India at 2047: Building the Future of Legal Education and Legal Profession”, The Daily Guardian, January 03, 2023.
7. "A letter to the new CJI, D Y Chandrachud: Five important tasks confront the 50th Chief Justice of India as he assumes office”, The Indian Express, November 08, 2022.
8. "Building a Globally Respected Legal System by 2047”, Education World, November 2023.
9. "Resisting attack on judiciary’s independence”, The Tribune, October 10, 2022.
10. "Livestreaming Supreme Court Proceedings: A step closer to a stronger democracy”, The Indian Express, October 04, 2022.
11. “India-UK ties at 75: Looking back, moving forward”, The Asian Age, June 14, 2022.
12. “India’s National Education Policy: Rhetoric and the reality”, The Times Of India, July 30, 2021.
13. “New education panel will help implement NEP more effectively”, The Deccan Chronicle, July 30, 2021.
14. “The vision of the National Education Policy must be served by its implementation”, The Indian Express, July 29, 2021.
15. “The way forward for implementing NEP”, The Tribune, July 28, 2021.
16. “NEP, one year later: Promises to keep and miles to go”, The Deccan Herald, July 28, 2021.
17. “Indian universities need immediate vaccination”, The Hindu, April 14, 2021.
18. “A university is not supposed to be a profit-driven corporation”, The Indian Express, April 3, 2021.
19. “Justice Surinder Singh Nijjar: An outstanding legal mind imbued with a vision”, The Tribune, March 31, 2021.
20. “The role of the university: Nation needs it, and it can only thrive with academic freedom and institutional autonomy”, The Times Of India, March 22, 2021.
