= O.P. Jindal University =

Private university in Raigarh, Chhattisgarh

O. P. Jindal University
- Type: State Private University
- Established: 2014
- Affiliations: UGC
- Chancellor: Shallu Jindal
- Vice-Chancellor: Dr. R. D. Patidar
- Location: Raigarh, Chhattisgarh, India; 22°03′42″N 83°21′01″E
- Website: www.opju.ac.in

O. P. Jindal University (OPJU) is a state private university located in Raigarh, Chhattisgarh, India. It was established by an Act of Legislature in the state assembly of Chhattisgarh in 2014. It was founded by the Jindal Education and Welfare Society. The OP Jindal University has UGC and AICTE affiliation.

== Schools ==
The O.P. Jindal University has following Schools:

- School of Engineering
- School of Management
- School of Science

== Courses ==
The O.P. Jindal University has following Schools:

- BTech- CSE, EE, MECH, MME, CIVIL, MINING Engineering
- MTech
- MBA
- EMBA
- BBA
- BCom (Hons.)
- MSc in Physics, Chemistry & Maths
- BSc (Hons) in Physics, Chemistry, Maths & Biotechnology
- PhD

== See also ==
- Om Prakash Jindal
