= Raj Kumar Saini =

Indian politician

Member Of Parliament Lok Sabha
- In office 16 May 2014 – 23 May 2019
- Preceded by: Naveen Jindal
- Succeeded by: Nayab Singh
- Constituency: Kurukshetra, Haryana

Personal details
- Born: 1 July 1953 (age 73)
- Party: Loktantra Suraksha Party (Present); Bhartiya Janata Party (before)
- Children: 3 (1 son and 2 daughters)
- As of 15 December, 2016

Raj Kumar Saini (born 1 July 1953) is an Indian politician. He served as the Member of Parliament for Kurukshetra, Haryana. In 2014, he was elected to the 16th Lok Sabha by defeating Naveen Jindal, a two-time MP from the Indian National Congress. He extended his unconditional support to the Indian National Congress during the 2024 Indian General Elections in the presence of Congress President Mallikarjun Kharge and Rahul Gandhi.

== Personal life ==
Rajkumar Saini was born on 1 July 1953 in Chhoti Rasur Village, Ambala district. He was the eldest son of a landless farmer. Despite economic hardships, he educated himself and ensured quality education for his younger siblings. Initially, he took land on contract for farming and later ventured into the business of brick kilns, poultry farms, and iron and steel industries in Haryana, Himachal Pradesh, and Jharkhand. From 1990 onwards, after being elected Sarpanch of Chhoti Rasor village, he became actively involved in politics.

== Political career ==
His political career began at a very young age. At just 24, in 1977, he was elected as the Sarpanch of his Gram Panchayat, Badi Rasor. He served two terms in this role and promoted education for all. In 1983, he became a member of the Panchayat Committee, Narayangar, Ambala, where he fulfilled his responsibilities with integrity. By 1994, he was a member of the District Council, Ambala. By this time, his business had also reached significant heights. In 1996, he advanced from district-level politics to state-level politics, becoming a member of the Haryana Legislative Assembly.

From 1997 to 1999, he served as the State Minister for Printing Stationery and Transportation in the Haryana Government. As Minister of State for Transport, he launched a campaign to educate truck and bus drivers, which received high praise from the government. In 2000, he was appointed Minister of State for Sports and Transport. During his tenure, he worked to promote state-level players and established several stadiums to support them. In May 2014, he was elected to the 16th Lok Sabha from Kurukshetra, Haryana.

In September 2014, he was appointed to the Standing Committee on Industry and the Advisory Committee of the Ministry of Steel and Mining. He contested the 2019 Haryana Assembly elections from Gohana but lost to Jagbir Singh Malik. Many believe he lost the election due to his controversial speeches against a particular community.

== Projection as Chief Ministerial candidate ==
In 2017, Saini mobilised the non-Jat Other Backward Class communities in Haryana against the Jat reservation agitation. At a rally organised in Jind, he advocated for a reservation system where each caste would receive a share proportional to its population in the state. He also proposed a 'two-child policy' to control population growth. Additionally, Saini founded a political outfit called the Lok Tantra Suraksha Manch, dedicated to social reformer Jyotiba Phule. In his bid to become the Chief Ministerial candidate for the 2019 Haryana State Assembly elections, Saini received support from Union Minister and then Member of Parliament from Karakat Lok Sabha constituency, Upendra Kushwaha. In a gathering in Haryana, Kushwaha described Saini as a mass leader capable of leading the state.

Previously, in 2016, Saini organised the Samajik Samanta rally in Kurukshetra to mark the death anniversary of Jyotirao Phule. At this rally, where Upendra Kushwaha was the chief guest, Saini criticised the dominance of Jats in state administration and police. He called on other communities in the state to unite and secure their share in administration and politics.

== See also ==
- Chhagan Bhujbal
