= Ridi Oswal =

- Born: 31 May 2004 (age 21)
- Genres: Pop; Indian fusion; dance-pop
- Occupation: Singer-songwriter
- Years active: 2021–present
- Website: realridi.com

Ridi Oswal is a Swiss singer, songwriter and composer. She co-founded Stop the B, an anti-bullying campaign, with her sister, Vasundhara. She is the youngest speaker at the UNESCO World Anti-Bullying Forum 2021.

== Personal life ==
Ridi Oswal is the daughter of Pankaj and Radhika Oswal. She was raised in Switzerland, and is currently pursuing chemical engineering in London. She started singing at the age of 8. Her debut single "Top Guy," was released in 2021.

== Discography ==
- "Top Guy
- Love Me until You Lose Me
- Happier
- Aaja Baby
- Guilty Feet
- Bang Bang
- Merry Go Round
