= Kamal Gupta =

Indian politician

Minister of Urban Development & Housing Government of Haryana
- In office 28 December 2021 – 17 October 2024
- Chief Minister: Manohar Lal Khattar
- Preceded by: Anil Vij

Member of Haryana Legislative Assembly
- In office 2014–2024
- Preceded by: Savitri Jindal
- Succeeded by: Savitri Jindal
- Constituency: Hisar

Personal details
- Born: 6 November 1952 (age 72); Farrukhnagar, Punjab, India
- Spouse: Pratima Gupta
- Education: MBBS, M. S.
- Profession: Doctor, Politician

Kamal Gupta is an Indian politician. He was elected to the Haryana Legislative Assembly from Hisar in the 2014 and 2019 Haryana Legislative Assembly election as a member of the Bharatiya Janata Party.
