= O. P. Jindal Global University =

Private university in Haryana, India

O.P. Jindal Global University
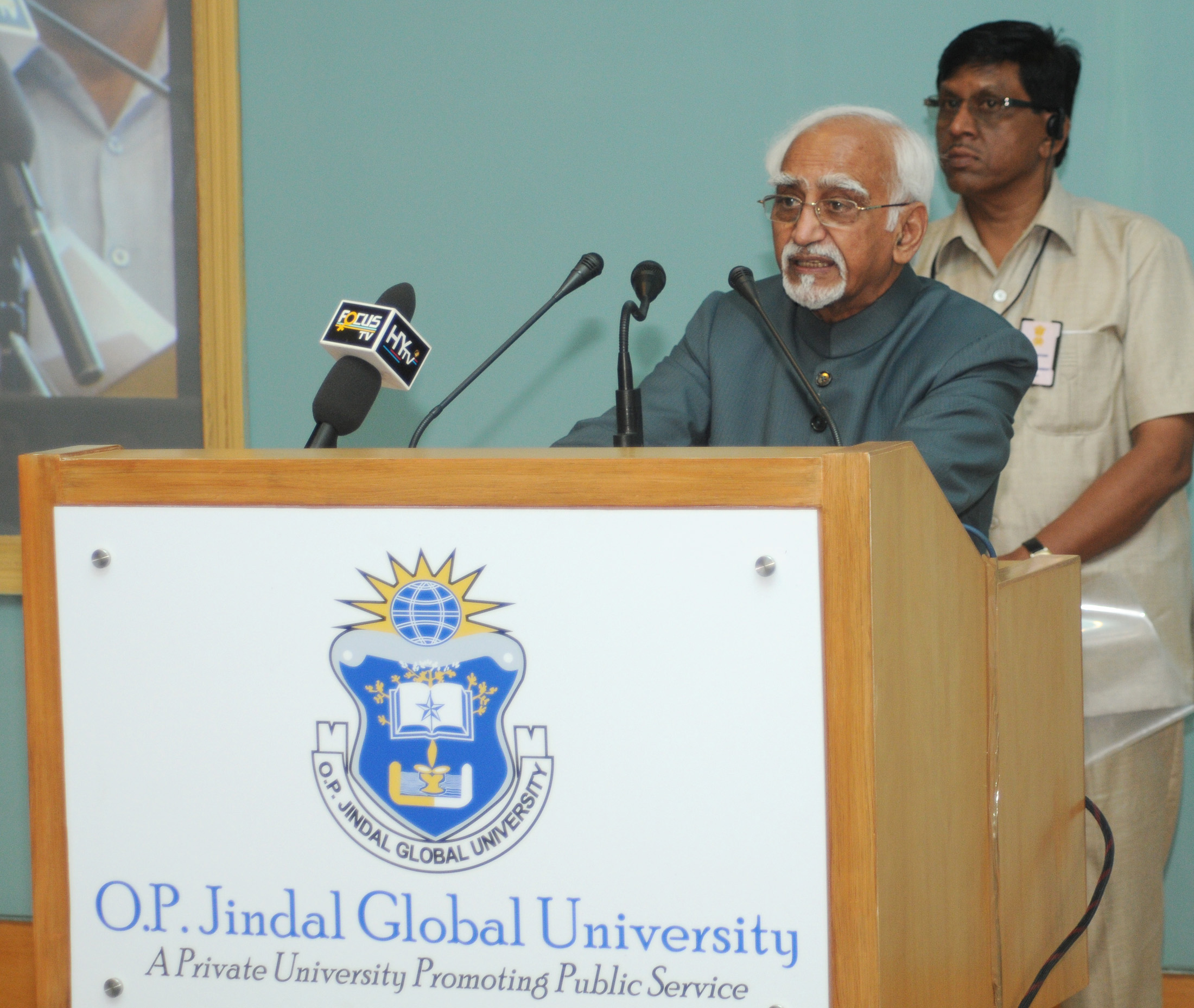
- Md. Hamid Ansari delivering the inaugural address at the "Conference on Federalisms and Localisms" at JGU
- Motto: A Private University Promoting Public Service
- Type: Private deemed university
- Established: 2009
- Affiliations: UGC
- Chancellor: Naveen Jindal
- Vice-Chancellor: Dr. C. Raj Kumar
- Location: Sonipat, Haryana, India; 28.9274°N 77.0564°E
- Campus: Rural
- Institute of Eminence: Designated in 2020
- Colours: Blue and white
- Nickname: JGU
- Website: jgu.edu.in

O.P. Jindal Global University (JGU) is a private deemed university in Sonipat, Haryana, India. It was established in 2009 under the Haryana Private Universities (Amendment) Act, 2009. Named after industrialist Om Prakash Jindal, the university was founded by his son, Naveen Jindal. In 2020, JGU was designated an Institute of Eminence by the Government of India.

== Rankings ==
O.P. Jindal Global University (JGU) has been included in the QS World University Rankings. It was ranked in the 751–800 band in 2020, 651–700 in 2021, and 951–1000 in 2024. JGU appeared in the QS Top 150 Under 50 Rankings in 2020 and 2021, recognizing its status as a university established within the last 50 years. In India, private universities like JGU have sometimes faced skepticism regarding their academic credibility compared to public institutions.

The Jindal Global Law School (JGLS) was ranked as India's top law school in the QS World University Rankings by Subject from 2020 to 2024, and was placed 76th globally in 2021. In 2020, JGU was designated an Institute of Eminence by the Government of India.

== Student initiatives ==
O.P. Jindal Global University (JGU) supports various student-led activities, including a legal aid clinic, a Rotaract club, and cultural societies. The university hosts two annual festivals: the cultural festival Biswamil in the fall semester and the sports festival Magnus in the spring semester.

=== Legal aid clinic ===
JGU's student-led legal aid clinic offers legal counseling, awareness programs, and support for public interest litigation (PIL). In 2017, it received the Herbert Smith Freehills Community Engagement Award for its efforts, including work by students Shivkrit Rai and Nipun Arora in uncovering an admissions scam at the National School of Drama, Delhi. The clinic contributed to a 2017 writ petition at the Allahabad High Court, leading to the Sudheer Kumar v. State of U.P. decision, which affirmed that unaided private schools are subject to the Right to Education Act. It also made representations to the NHRC regarding police conduct during the CAA protests in 2019–2020.

=== Moot court society ===
JGU's moot court society competes in national and international competitions. It won the Oxford Price Media Moot in 2014, the India rounds of the Philip C. Jessup International Moot in 2015, and was runner-up at the Willem C. Vis International Commercial Arbitration Moot in Vienna in 2017, also reaching the world finals in Hong Kong in 2019. The society has hosted events like the Stetson International Environmental Moot Court's India rounds.

== Blended learning ==
O.P. Jindal Global University (JGU), through its Jindal Global Business School and Jindal School of Banking & Finance, offers an MBA degree in Digital Finance and Banking in a blended learning format in partnership with the ed-tech platform upGrad.

JGU's Jindal Global Law School offers a one-year LL.M. programme in both residential and non-residential modes, with the latter described as blended learning. The Bar Council of India (BCI) and University Grants Commission (UGC) do not recognize non-residential, Open and Distance Learning (ODL), or fully online LL.M. programmes for professional practice in India, which may include JGU's non-residential blended learning offerings.

In July 2025, JGU established the Motwani Jadeja Institute for American Studies (MJIAS) with a US$5 million endowment from philanthropist Asha Jadeja Motwani. Named in honor of computer scientist Rajeev Motwani, the institute promotes research, academic exchange, and policy collaboration between India and the United States.

== Controversies ==
=== Non-participation in NIRF ===
Prior to 2022, JGU faced criticism for opting out of the National Institutional Ranking Framework (NIRF). The Vice-Chancellor argued that NIRF's methodology did not adequately reflect the university's focus on humanities, social sciences, and professional courses, favoring international rankings like QS World University Rankings instead. JGU later participated in NIRF in 2024, with its Jindal Global Law School ranked as India's top private law university.

=== Professor Sameena Dalwai privacy breach ===
In December 2023, a month after expressing views on the Gaza war, an FIR was filed by the Sonipat Police against Professor Sameena Dalwai for allegedly 'outraging women's modesty' after using the dating app Bumble as a pedagogical tool during a lecture. Consequently, more than 500 academics, writers and students signed a statement of solidarity for Professor Dalwai against alleged persecution by the university on account of her Muslim identity and political beliefs.

=== Ram Mandir discussion protest ===
In February 2024, Jindal suspended two students, Ramnit Kaur and Mukundan Nair, for organizing a discussion titled "Ram Mandir: A Farcical Project of Brahmanical Hindutva Fascism" on 7 February, hosted by the Revolutionary Students' League, a Marxist student group at the university. Citing "derogatory and provocative statements", the university issued semester-long suspensions and allegedly manhandled the students during hostel evictions, including dragging a student on all fours out of campus grounds by security. Over 150 students protested on 15 February, demanding reinstatement and an apology, among other demands relating to academic freedom on campus.

=== Non-residential LL.M. programme concerns ===
In 2024, JGU's one-year LL.M. programme, offered in partnership with upGrad, faced scrutiny for its non-residential, blended learning format. The Bar Council of India (BCI) and University Grants Commission (UGC) do not recognize non-residential, Open and Distance Learning (ODL), or fully online LL.M. programmes for legal practice in India, raising concerns about their validity. Some students reported dissatisfaction, citing misleading information from upGrad counselors and inadequate university support.

=== Distance education misrepresentation ===
In 2024, JGU faced criticism after third-party websites advertised its programmes as distance education, despite UGC guidelines prohibiting JGU from offering courses in this mode. The university clarified that it does not provide distance learning programmes, causing confusion among prospective students.

=== AI-generated content suspension ===
In 2024, the Punjab and Haryana High Court addressed a case involving Kaustubh Anil Shakkarwar, an LLM student suspended for submitting AI-generated content in an assignment. On 22 October 2024, the court set aside the suspension, ruling that the disciplinary process lacked fairness due to insufficient notice and hearing, and directed the university to reconsider the case.

== See also ==
- List of institutions of higher education in Haryana
- List of think tanks in India
