= Jindal Tamnar Thermal Power Plant =

Power station in Chhattisgarh, India

Coordinates: 22.104°N 83.445°E

Jindal Tanmar Thermal Power Plant is a coal-based thermal power plant located in Tamnar village near Raigarh town in Raigarh district in the Indian state of Chhattisgarh. The power plant is operated by the Jindal Power Limited which is a subsidiary of Jindal Steel and Power.

The coal for the plant is sourced from captive coal mine. The Engineering, procurement and construction contract was given to Bharat Heavy Electricals.

== Capacity ==
It has planned capacity of 3400 MW (4x250 MW, 4x600 MW).

| Unit No. | Generating Capacity | Commissioned on | Status |
|---|---|---|---|
| 1 | 250 MW | 2007 December | Running |
| 2 | 250 MW | 2008 | Running |
| 3 | 250 MW | 2008 | Running |
| 4 | 250 MW | 2008 | Running |
| 5 | 600 MW | 2014 March | Running |
| 6 | 600 MW | 2014 April | Running |
| 7 | 600 MW | 2015 January | Running |
| 8 | 600 MW | 2015 April | Running |
