= Pankaj Oswal =

Indian-Swiss businessman

Pankaj Oswal is an Indian-Swiss businessman with a portfolio encompassing petrochemicals, real estate, fertilisers, and mining.

== Career ==
Oswal is the son of Abhay Kumar Oswal, founder of Oswal Agro Mills and Oswal Greentech. He grew up in India and studied at Mayo College in Ajmer and the Manipal Institute of Technology. After graduating, he worked in several of his father's enterprises.

In 2001, Oswal arrived in Perth, Western Australia and founded Burrup Holdings Limited, a fertiliser company. In 2006, the company opened a liquid ammonia plant on the Burrup Peninsula, establishing itself as one of the world's largest liquid ammonia production companies. In 2010, Burrup Holdings collapsed and entered receivership amidst controversy. In 2011, Oswal sold his majority stake in the company to ANZ Bank. It would later exit receivership and be renamed Yara Pilbara after it was taken over by minor stakeholder Yara International.

As of 2023, Oswal has a business portfolio encompassing petrochemicals, real estate, fertilisers, and mining, and has a reported net worth of overUS$3 billion.

== Personal life ==
Oswal's brother is singer and businessman Shael Oswal, and his sister Shallu is married to industrialist and politician Naveen Jindal; their father Abhay died in 2016. Oswal has been married to Radhika Oswal since 1997; the couple have two daughters, Vasundhara and Ridi.

Following the collapse of Burrup Holdings, the Oswal family moved from Perth to Dubai. Since 2013, the Oswals have lived in Switzerland.

== Controversies ==
=== Lawsuits ===
==== ANZ Bank ====
Following the collapse of Burrup Holdings in 2010 and the company entering receivership, in competing legal claims over billions of dollars, Oswal and his wife and their bank, ANZ Bank attacked each other.

The couple had been accused of embezzling upwards of A$150 million from Burrup Holdings to fund a lifestyle of private jets, yachts and luxury cars, as well as to establish a vegetarian restaurant chain and build a luxury home for their family in Perth. In a counterclaim, the Oswals had accused ANZ staff of acting in a bigoted manner towards them, emphasising their background as Indian nationals. They had also claimed ANZ's former chief risk officer Chris Page had used physical force by putting Oswal in a headlock to force them to sign a guarantee over their shares that led to the forced sale of their stake. ANZ's chief legal counsel was also accused of telling Oswal's wife they would report the alleged embezzlement and she and her husband would go to jail and their children would be orphans if they did not sign the guarantee. They also claimed ANZ breached its fiduciary duty when selling Burrup Holdings.

In August 2016, the parties settled their lawsuits over the Burrup Holdings business. ANZ paid an undisclosed amount said to be hundreds of millions of dollars to the Oswals for taking over Burrup Holdings without giving due consideration; ANZ's claim that the Oswals misappropriated funds was also dropped.

==== Other ====
During their legal battle with ANZ, the couple also faced suits by a number of creditors including the Australian Taxation Office and the Shire of Peppermint Grove, which were also settled in 2016. That same year, Oswal was also involved in a legal clash against his brother and the rest of his family over his father's inheritance.

In 2020, the couple sued Swiss boarding school Institut Le Rosey over alleged bullying against their daughter.

=== Taj on Swan ===
In 2006, the Oswals bought a 6,582 square metres (70,850 sq ft) block of land overlooking the Swan River in the Perth suburb of Peppermint Grove for A$22 million, equivalent to A$32.6 million in 2022, with the intention of building a luxury home for their family. The home, which would have included a private gym, beauty salon, observatory with a revolving roof, parking for 17 cars and a large swimming pool, featured an Indian-inspired architectural style, leading it to be nicknamed Taj on Swan in reference to the Taj Mahal. With an estimated worth of A$70 million, it would have been the most expensive house in Australia.

Following the collapse of Burrup Holdings in 2010, the Oswals left Australia, leaving the partially constructed home unfinished and abandoned. After two failed attempts to sell the incomplete home, over the next several years the property attracted squatters and vandals, and the deteriorating structure was dubbed an eyesore by neighbours. After years of legal objections by the Oswals, the unfinished building was eventually demolished in 2016, with the land sold in 2018.
