= Om Prakash Jindal =

Indian politician (1930–2005)

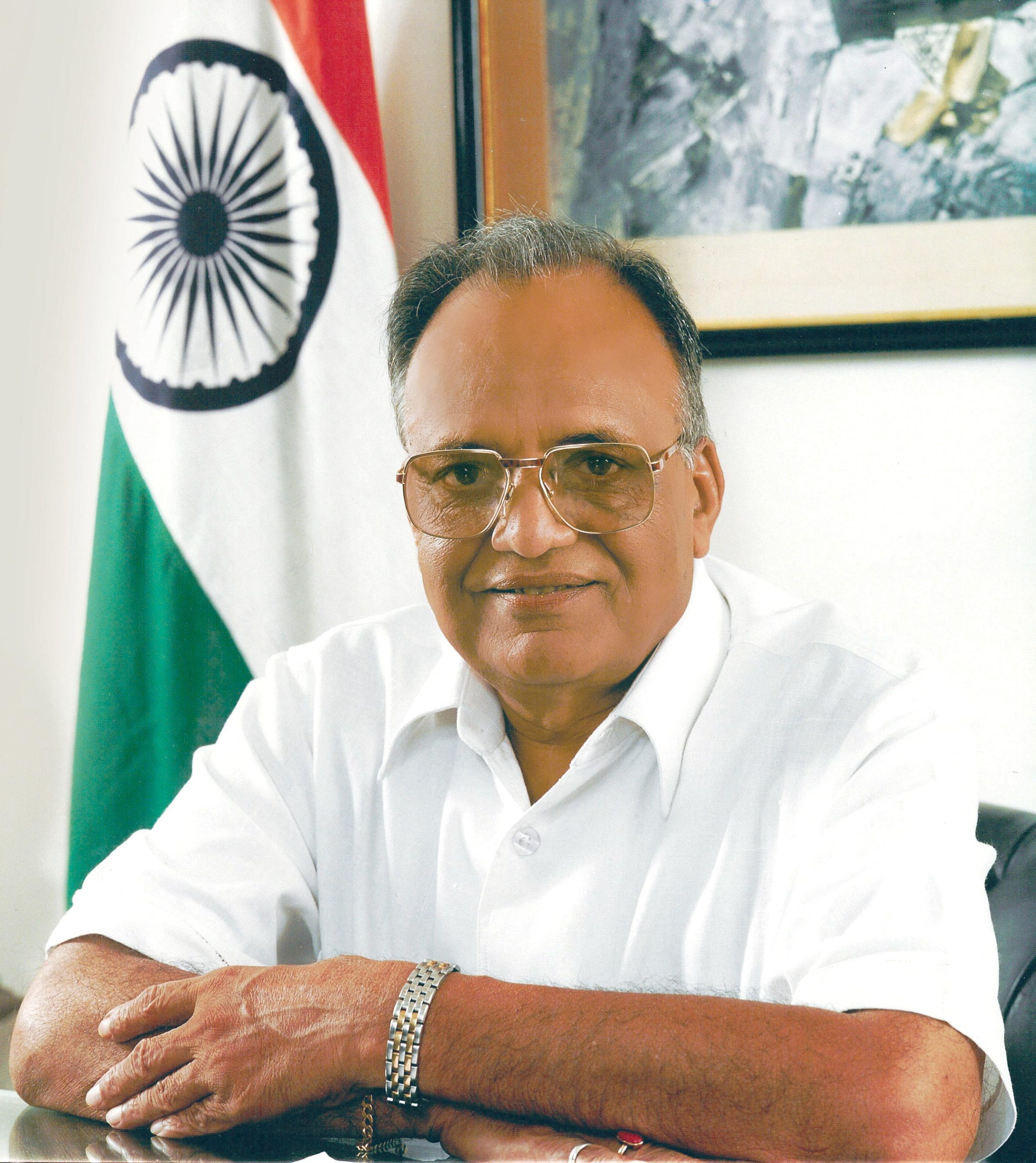
- Jindal in 2001

Minister of Power, Government of Haryana
- In office 5 March 2005 – 31 March 2005
- Other Ministry: Printing and Stationery
- Chief Minister: Bhupinder Singh Hooda
- Preceded by: Om Prakash Chautala (as Chief Minister)
- Succeeded by: Bhupinder Singh Hooda (as Chief Minister)

Member of the Haryana Legislative Assembly
- In office 25 February 2000 – 31 March 2005
- Preceded by: Om Prakash Mahajan
- Succeeded by: Savitri Jindal
- Constituency: Hisar

Personal details
- Born: 7 August 1930 Hisar, Punjab Province, British India (present day Haryana, India)
- Died: 31 March 2005 (aged 74) Saharanpur, Uttar Pradesh, India
- Cause of death: Helicopter crash
- Party: Indian National Congress
- Spouse: Vidya Jindal (m. 1946; died 1964) Savitri Jindal (m. 1966)
- Children: 9, including Sajjan Jindal, Naveen Jindal)
- Known for: JSW Steel, Jindal Steel and Power

Om Prakash Jindal (7 August 1930 – 31 March 2005), also known as O. P. Jindal, was an Indian industrialist and politician. He was the founder of the OP Jindal Group, a major steel and power conglomerate.

== Early life and education ==
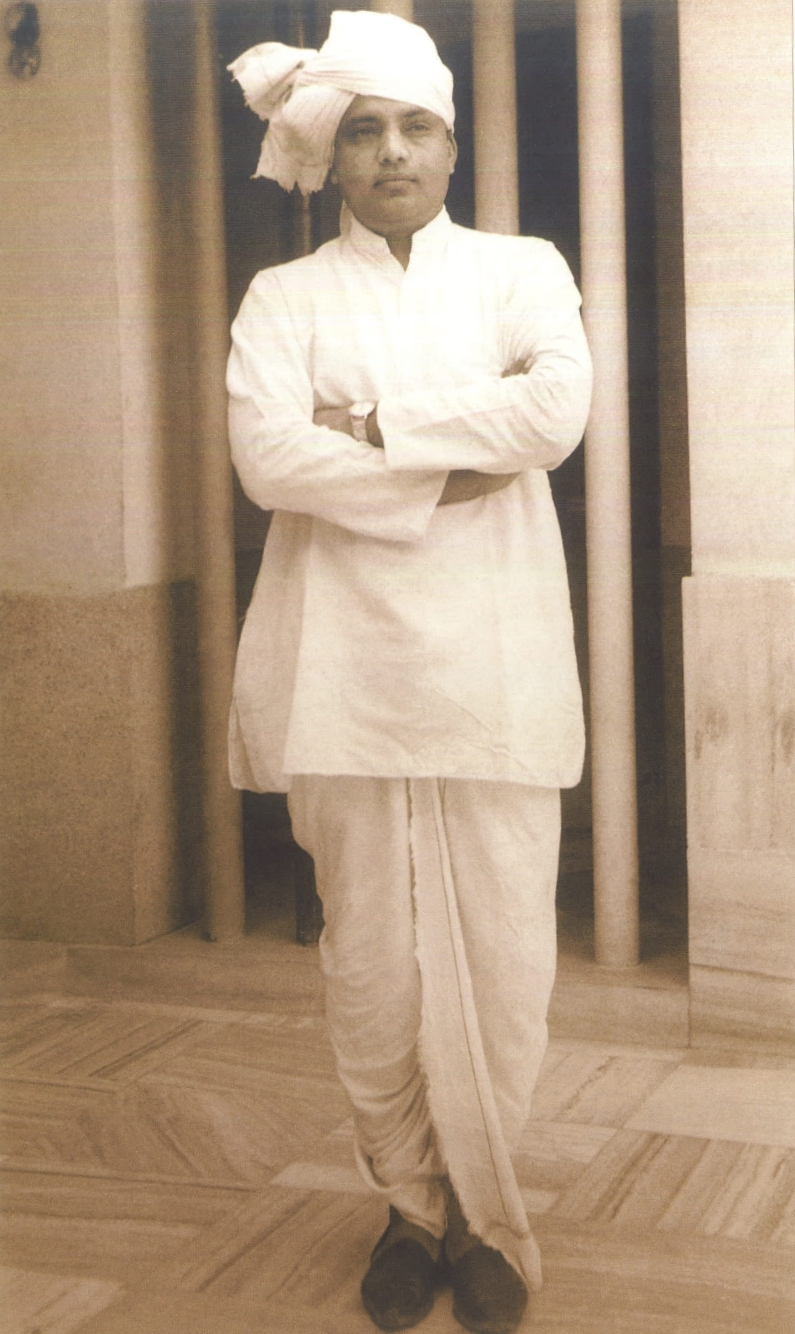
Om Prakash Jindal in 1950s

Jindal was born in the village of Nalwa in Hisar district of Haryana to a farmer family. He began his elementary education in his village but later continued it in the nearby town of Hansi.

As a teenager, he was into bodybuilding and considered becoming a wrestler in Haryana's heartland. However, his parents sent him to Calcutta, along with his elder brothers, due to irregular monsoon patterns and constant disputes over land ownership, to learn the basics of wholesale and retail textile trading, as Eastern India was a hub of commerce at the time.

== Career ==
=== Business career ===
At 20, Jindal began his entrepreneurial journey by moving to Calcutta, where he worked as a trader dealing in steel pipes and tubes. He traded in iron and transported surplus pipes from Assam to sell in Calcutta, much of which came from metal left behind by the United States Army Air Forces' Tenth Air Force after World War II. By the age of 22 in 1952, he set up a factory in Liluah in Howrah to make pipe bends and sockets by using waste pipe products from Tata's Jamshedpur factory and Kalinga Tubes' Cuttack factory. In 1964, he expanded his ventures by founding Jindal India Limited, a full-fledged pipe-production company. Five years later, he established another factory in Calcutta.

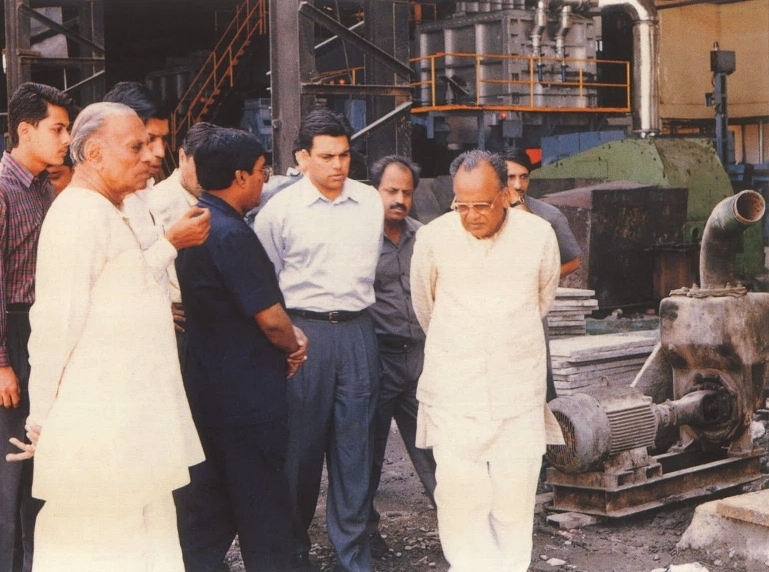
Jindal with his son Sajjan Jindal at JSW Steel, Torangallu village in Vijaynagar, Karnataka, in 2000

He went on to establish Jindal Steel and Power, JSW Group and Jindal Stainless Limited under the flagship of the OP Jindal Group, of which he was the founding chairman. In November 2004, Jindal was awarded the "Life Time Achievement Award" for his outstanding contribution to the Indian steel industry by the Bengal Chamber of Commerce and Industry. According to the 2004 Forbes List, he was ranked 13th amongst the richest Indians and 548th amongst the richest persons in the world.

Before his death in a helicopter crash on 31 March 2005, Jindal divided his businesses among his four sons - Prithviraj Jindal, Sajjan Jindal, Ratan Jindal and Naveen Jindal, structuring it with cross-holdings to ensure mutual benefit and shared growth. To maintain family unity, his wife, Savitri Jindal, was appointed chairperson of the OP Jindal Group and its companies.

=== Political career ===
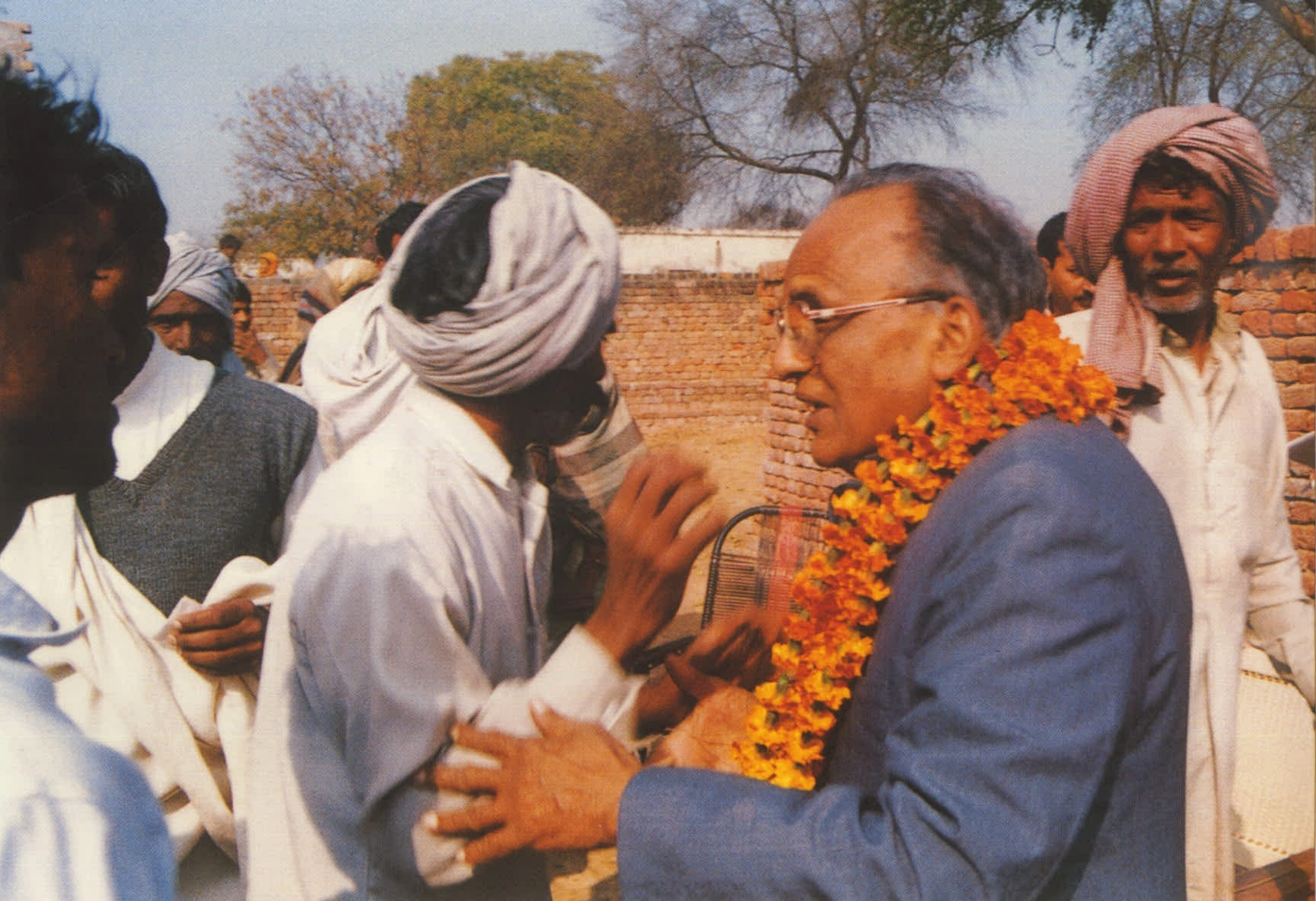
Jindal with people of Nalwa village in Hisar, Haryana, during the mid-1990s.

Jindal first won election from Haryana's Hisar Assembly constituency and was elected to the Haryana Legislative Assembly in 1991 under the Haryana Vikas Party. Later, he got re-elected again in 2000, and 2005 under different parties. He also contested and won the 1996 Lok Sabha election from Haryana's Kurukshetra Lok Sabha constituency. He served as Government of Haryana's Minister of Power at the time of his death and had previously served on the Committee on Food, Civil Supplies, and Public Distribution from 1996 to 1997.

After his demise, his widow, Savitri Jindal, contested the election for the same Hisar Assembly constituency seat that her husband had held and was elected. She subsequently was appointed as the Minister of State for Revenue, Disaster Management, Rehabilitation, and Housing in the Haryana's state government.

== Personal life and death ==
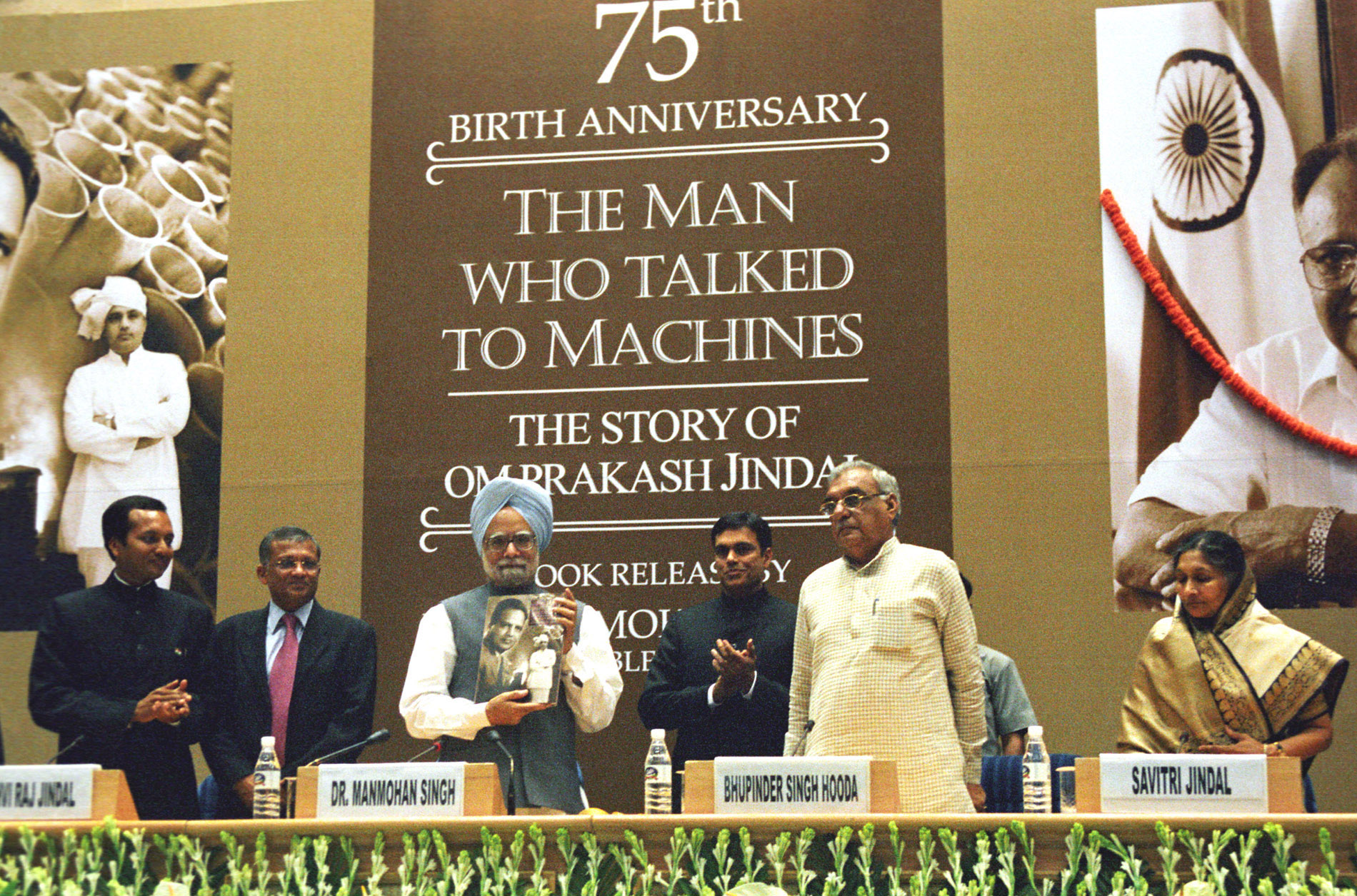
The Indian Prime Minister, Manmohan Singh releasing a book "The Man who Talked to Machines-Story of O. P. Jindal" in 2005

Jindal had six children with his first wife Vidya Devi, who died at the age of 34. Shortly after her death, he married her younger sister Savitri. They had three children together.

Jindal died in a helicopter crash on 31 March 2005.

On 7 August 2005, then Prime Minister of India, Manmohan Singh, released the biography of Om Prakash Jindal titled The Man Who Talked to Machines: The Story of Om Prakash Jindal.

Om Prakash Ji was an inspiring and enterprising person, whose life story is one of extraordinary achievements. His myriad accomplishments truly represent the triumph of the human spirit over the many adversities of life. I pay tribute to the memory of this extraordinary son of India and it is in this context that I am especially grateful for this opportunity to be amongst you today.

— Manmohan Singh, 13th Prime Minister of India

== See also ==
- Maharaja Agrasen Medical College, Agroha
- O. P. Jindal Global University
- O.P. Jindal University
