= Shael Oswal =

Indian singer (born 1978)

- Born: Shailendra Oswal; 28 May 1978 (age 48); Ludhiana, Punjab, India
- Occupations: Singer; Entrepreneur
- Years active: 2000–present
- Spouse: Sameksha (m. 2020)
- Relatives: Pankaj Oswal (brother); Naveen Jindal (brother-in-law)

Shael Oswal (born 28 May 1978) is a Singapore-based Indian industrialist, entrepreneur and singer. He is the scion of Oswal group company Oswal Agro Mills and Oswal Greentech. He was the singer of the video album Soniye Hiriye released in 2006. He married actress Sameksha in July 2020. She was also the co-star of his album in Makhmalli Pyaar, Tere Naal. His latest video album Ishaara was directed by his wife Sameksha which was released in 2021.

== Personal life ==
Shael Oswal was born on 28 May 1978 in Ludhiana, Punjab, His father Abhey Kumar Oswal was a textile businessman and his mother Aruna Oswal took charge as the chairman of the firm after his father demise in 2016, his brother's name is Pankaj Oswal and his sister Shallu Jindal is married to Indian businessman Naveen Jindal. He did his schooling at Mayo College and graduated from Delhi University in commerce. Shael married actress Sameksha at local Gurudwara in Singapore in July 2020. Before tying the knot, Oswal has shot a couple of albums like Makhmalli Pyaar and Tere Naal with her. He has two children Shivam and Sohanaa Oswal from his estranged wife.

== Career ==
Shael is an entrepreneur president Director of coal mining company PT Garda Tujuh Buana and singer, his debut video album was Dud (and Kahan Hai Tu), it got a very good response and sold about a lakh (100,000) copies, he got fame from hit track called Soniye Hiriye in 2006. Later he released many video albums like Jaan Ve, Zindagi, Yaar, Makhmalli Pyaar, Tere Naal, etc., His recent track was "Ishaara" which was released the last valentine at JW Marriott in Chandigarh, the album was directed by Sameksha Oswal under SSO Production and music composed by Vidyut Goswami and had lyrics by Vimal Kashyap.

In 2022, Oswal along with his wife Sameksha, produced the film Max, Min and Meowzaki under their production house - SSO Productions.

== Discography ==
=== Albums ===
Year	Album(s)	Label
1999	Hello	Magnasound Records
2000	Kahaan Hai Tu	Lucky Star Entertainment
2001	Only U	Lucky Star Entertainment
2002	Hasna Kamaal	Lucky Star Entertainment
2004	Jhoom	
2006	Aetbaar	Universal Music India
2007	Sun Le... Ab Yeh Aasman	Universal Music India

=== Music videos ===
Year	Song	Album	Singer
2000	Dud	Dud	Shael Oswal
2000	Kahan Hai Tu	Kahan Hai Tu	Shael Oswal
2006	Soniye Hiriye	Aitbaar	Shael Oswal
2006	Umr Bhar	Aitbaar	Shael Oswal
2006	Nachle Soniye Tu	Aitbaar	Shael Oswal
2006	Aaja Soniye	Aitbaar	Shael Oswal
2006	Dil Jaaniyan	Aitbaar	Shael Oswal
2006	Kaate Kate	Aitbaar	Shael Oswal
2007	Pahla Nasha Pyar Ka	Pahla Nasha Pyar Ka	Shael Oswal
2007	Shaam-O-Sahar Teri Yaad	Sun Le Ab Yeh Jahan	Shael Oswal
2008	Jhindari	Jhindari	Shael Oswal
2013	Zindegi	Zindegi	Shael Oswal
2013	Jaan Ve	Jaan Ve	Shael Oswal
2013	Chehra	Jaan Ve	Shael Oswal
2013	Party Cat	Jaan Ve	Shael Oswal
2013	Ek Tera Pyar	Jaan Ve	Shael Oswal
2013	Guftagoo	Jaan Ve	Shael Oswal
2013	Asemit	Jaan Ve	Shael Oswal
2013	Sarfaraaz	Jaan Ve	Shael Oswal
2013	Galsun	Jaan Ve	Shael Oswal
2013	Yaari	Jaan Ve	Shael Oswal
2014	Teri Yaad Mein	Teri Yaad Mein	Shael Oswal
2014	Zindegi	Zindegi	Shael Oswal
2014	Bandishein	Bandishein	Shael Oswal
2014	Khwaishen	Khwaishen : AN ENDLESS DREAM	Shael Oswal
2014	DASVE SAJNAA	DASVE SAJNAA	Shael Oswal
2015	Dil Ki Baatein	Dil Ki Baatein	Shael Oswal
2015	Abhi Abhi	Abhi Abhi	Shael Oswal
2016	Dil Di Duaa	Dil Di Duaa	Shael Oswal
2016	Jaanaa	Jaanaa	Shael Oswal
2016	Baatein	Dil Ki Baatein	Shael Oswal
2017	Arzii	Arzii	Shael Oswal
2017	Meri Jaan	Meri Jaan	Shael Oswal
2018	Behakii Behakii	Behakii Behakii	Shael Oswal
2018	Ae Dil Mere	Ae Dil Mere	Shael Oswal
2018	Tere Binn	Tere Binn	Shael Oswal
2019	Makhmalii Pyaar	Makhmalii Pyaar	Shael Oswal
2019	Onlyy U	Onlyy U	Shael Oswal
2020	Tere Naal	Tere Naal	Shael Oswal
2020	Tu Milaa To	Tu Milaa To	Shael Oswal
2021	Ishaara	Ishaara	Shael Oswal
