= Naveen Jindal =

Indian industrialist, philanthropist, politician, and sportsperson (born 1970)

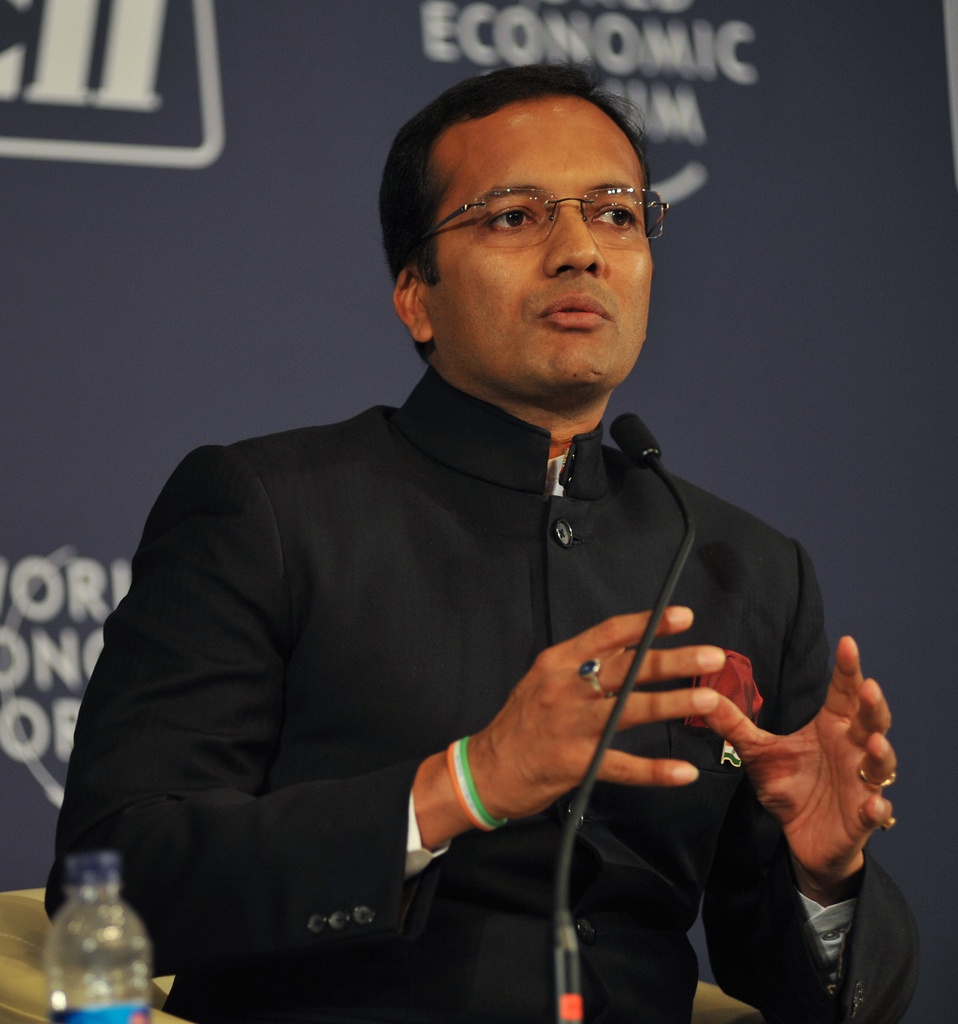
- Naveen Jindal at the World Economic Forum India Economic Summit, New Delhi, 2010

Member of Parliament, Lok Sabha
- Incumbent
- Assumed office 4 June 2024
- Preceded by: Nayab Singh Saini
- Constituency: Kurukshetra, Haryana
- In office 22 May 2004 – 16 May 2014
- Preceded by: Kailasho Devi
- Succeeded by: Raj Kumar Saini
- Constituency: Kurukshetra, Haryana

Personal details
- Born: 9 March 1970 (age 56) Hisar, Haryana, India
- Party: Bharatiya Janata Party (since 2024)
- Other political affiliations: Indian National Congress (1991–2024)
- Spouse: Shallu Jindal (m. 1994)
- Children: Venkatesh Jindal Yashasvini Jindal
- Parents: Om Prakash Jindal (father); Savitri Jindal (mother)
- Relatives: Sajjan Jindal (brother); Shael Oswal (brother-in-law); Pankaj Oswal (brother-in-law)
- Education: Delhi University; University of Texas at Dallas
- Profession: Industrialist; Philanthropist; Politician; Sportsperson

Naveen Jindal (born 9 March 1970) is an Indian industrialist, politician, and philanthropist. He is the chairman of Jindal Steel and the founding chancellor of O.P. Jindal Global University. He represents the Kurukshetra constituency in the 18th Lok Sabha as a member of the Bharatiya Janata Party (BJP). He previously served as a Member of Parliament from 2004 to 2014 representing the Indian National Congress.

Jindal is known for his role in a landmark legal case that led to a 2004 Supreme Court ruling affirming the right of Indian citizens to fly the national flag on all days, a right previously restricted under the Flag Code of India.

As a polo player and sports enthusiast, Jindal has led the Jindal Panther Polo Team and also represented India in international shooting competitions, including the Asian Games and South Asian Games. He has received several recognitions, including the Lifetime Achievement Award from the University of Texas at Dallas in 2023 and the Ernst & Young Entrepreneur of the Year Award in 2010.

Jindal is also active in the education and CSR sectors through institutions and initiatives established in memory of his father, O.P. Jindal.

== Background and personal life ==
Jindal was born in Hisar, Haryana, on 9 March 1970. He was the youngest of the four sons of the late industrialist-philanthropist-politician Om Prakash Jindal and Savitri Jindal. Both of them were ministers in the Government of Haryana. Jindal studied at Campus School, CCS HAU and Delhi Public School before graduating in Commerce from Hans Raj College, Delhi University in 1990. He completed his MBA at the University of Texas at Dallas in 1992. There he served first as Student Government vice president, then president, at the same time earning the Student Leader of the Year Award.

His father was born into a farming family in Haryana's Hisar district, and became the founder of the steel and power conglomerate, the O.P. Jindal Group. Om Prakash Jindal contested elections to the Haryana Legislative Assembly and won in 1991, 2000 and 2005; he also contested elections to the Lok Sabha from Haryana's Kurukshetra constituency in 1996 and won. He served as a minister in the Government of Haryana until he died in a helicopter crash in 2005, aged 74.

After his death, his wife Savitri Jindal joined politics and contested the Haryana Legislative Assembly elections from Hisar in 2005 and 2009 from the ticket of the Indian National Congress and won both terms. She was appointed as a minister in the Government of Haryana. She was elected in 2024 from Hisar as an independent member. She is the Chairperson Emeritus of Jindal Stainless Limited.

Naveen is married to Shallu Jindal. The couple has two children, a son and a daughter.

Naveen has eight siblings, including Prithviraj Jindal, Sajjan Jindal and Ratan Jindal. Prithviraj Jindal is the Chairman (Non Executive) of Jindal SAW Ltd. Sajjan Jindal is the Chairman of JSW Group.

=== Right to display the Indian national flag ===
In 1992, Naveen Jindal hoisted the Indian national flag at his factory in Raigarh, Chhattisgarh (then Madhya Pradesh). The local administration objected, citing the Flag Code of India, which restricted flag hoisting by private citizens to specific occasions. In response, Jindal filed a petition in the Delhi High Court, arguing that such restrictions were not law and violated the constitutional right to freedom of expression under Article 19(1)(a).

The Delhi High Court ruled in Jindal’s favor in 1995, stating that the Flag Code was a set of executive instructions and not enforceable law. The court held that flying the national flag was a form of expression protected under the Constitution.

The Union Government appealed the decision, and the matter was heard by the Supreme Court. In its 2004 judgment, the Supreme Court upheld the High Court’s decision, affirming that the right to fly the national flag was indeed part of the fundamental right to freedom of expression, provided it adhered to the Flag Code of India.

Jindal’s efforts in the legal battle are widely regarded as pivotal in making it a right for all Indian citizens to display the national flag on any day. He has since advocated for declaring 23 January—the date of the Supreme Court ruling—as “National Flag Day”.

== Business ==
=== Jindal Steel and Power ===
Jindal is the Chairman of Jindal Steel and Power Limited (formerly known as Jindal Strips Limited) which was a moderately performing enterprise when Jindal first took over its Raigarh and Raipur operations in 1993. Today, JSPL operates an iron manufacturing plant in Raigarh, Chhattisgarh, and plants in Jharkhand and Odisha. The company has set up captive power plants using waste products from the sponge iron making process to generate power.

He has been ranked amongst Asia’s 25 Hottest People in Business by the Fortune Asia magazine for turning a struggling steel company into an Asian blue-chip giant. He has also been ranked as India’s Best CEO by Business Today based on a BT-INSEAD-HBR study of top value creators for the period 1995 to 2011. JSPL has been rated the Second Highest Value Creator in the world by the Boston Consulting Group (BCG) of USA.

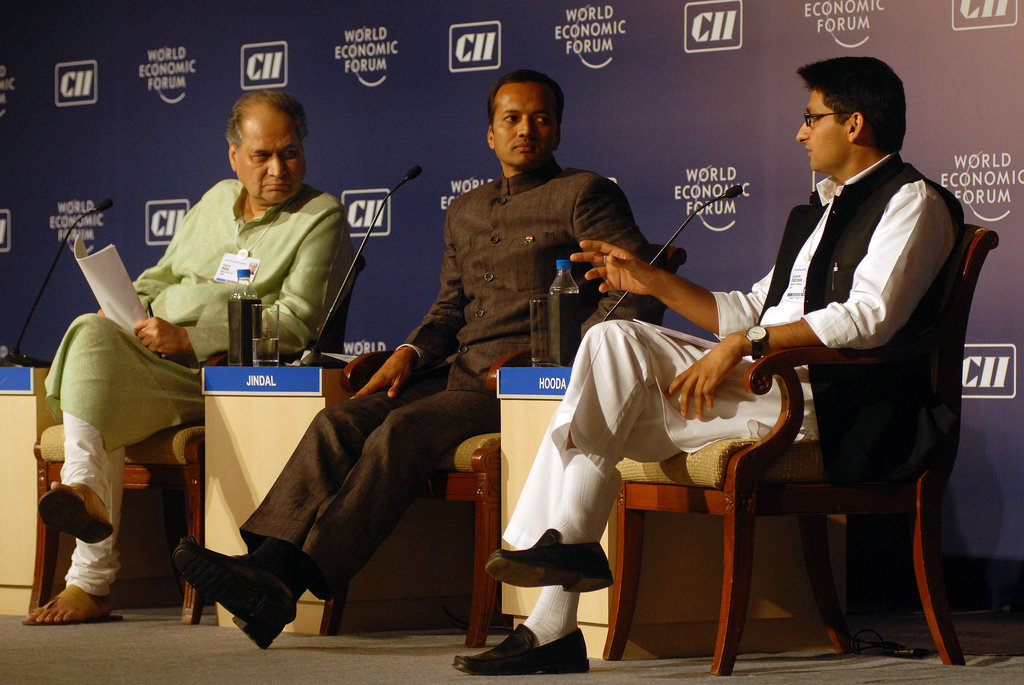
Naveen Jindal (center)

Naveen Jindal set up the world's first coal-gasification based steelmaking plant at Angul, Odisha that uses the locally available high-ash coal and turns it into synthesis gas for steel making thus reducing the dependence on imported coke-rich coal. Jindal believes that coal gasification technology has immense potential for countries like India, where non-coking coal is abundantly available. JSPL's coal gas-based steel tech became a case study at Harvard University.

Recently Union steel minister Ram Chandra Prasad Singh inaugurated Jindal Steel's 1.4 MTPA TMT rebar mill at its integrated complex in Odisha's Angul district.

Jindal Steel is expanding its Angul Plant capacity from 6 MTPA to 12MTPA and the company will achieve an overall 15 MTPA steelmaking capacity by 2025.

In January 2025, Jindal Steel & Power announced an additional investment of ₹70,000 crore in Odisha to expand the Angul plant from 6 MTPA to 12 MTPA, with plans to increase the capacity further by 2030.

=== Coal Block Deallocation ===
In 2014, the Supreme Court of India in a surprise move cancelled the coal blocks allocated to Indian steel and Power companies that had been allocated through successive Governments at the Centre. Jindal's company too was affected as its coal blocks got cancelled and it has to pay the arbitrary retrospective levy. This led to a scenario where most of the private steel and power companies in India became Non Performing Assets.

Jindal's company JSPL saw a tough time with debt levels going to 50,000 crore rupees.

=== Turnaround ===
The company went from the second-highest wealth creator with a share price of Rs 700 to a debt-ridden one with its share price tumbling down to Rs 62. The company however scripted a turnaround and came back green. In 2022 March, its share price jumped to Rs 530.

Business India magazine wrote: "JSPL has placed a singular focus on sweating its assets, improving capacity utilisations and deleveraging. From a loss-making company to making a PAT of Rs7,500 crore is a big story."

== Philanthropy ==
=== OP Jindal Global University and OP Jindal University, Chhattisgarh ===
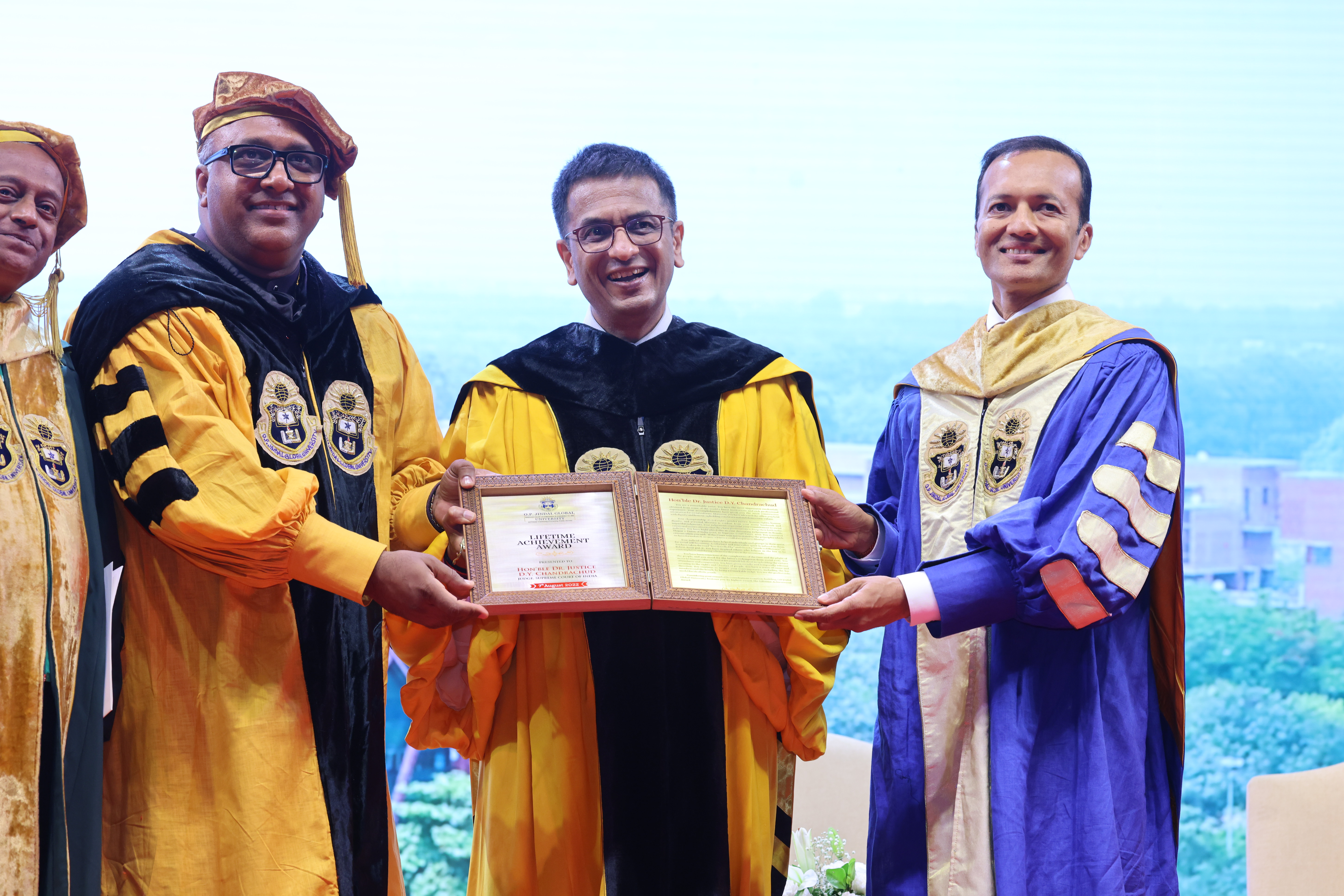
Naveen Jindal (right) at O.P. Jindal Global University

Naveen Jindal founded the O.P. Jindal Global University (JGU) in 2009 in Sonipat, Haryana, in memory of his father, O.P. Jindal. The institution is recognized by the University Grants Commission (UGC) and has gained attention for its global faculty recruitment and multidisciplinary liberal arts education. JGU has been ranked among the top private universities in India by QS and other academic rankings.

He is also the founding patron of OP Jindal University (OPJU) in Raigarh, Chhattisgarh. Established in 2008 as an engineering college, it later evolved into a private university offering specialized programs in steelmaking, metallurgy, and management. In 2020, it was recognized as the ‘Best Private University in Chhattisgarh’ at The Progress Global Awards.

=== Naveen Jindal School of Management ===
Jindal completed his MBA at the University of Texas at Dallas. In 2011, he made a major philanthropic contribution to the institution, following which the School of Management was renamed the "Naveen Jindal School of Management" in his honor.

=== Philanthropy During COVID-19 Pandemic ===
During the second wave of the COVID-19 pandemic in 2021, Jindal Steel and Power (JSPL), under Jindal’s leadership, diverted industrial oxygen production for medical use. The company supplied oxygen to hospitals in several Indian states, including Delhi, Odisha, and Chhattisgarh. These efforts were acknowledged by various state governments and covered in national media.

He was also recognized with the AsiaOne Super 50 COVID-19 Commitment Award for 2020–21 for these contributions.

== Politics ==
Naveen Jindal's political journey began during his student years at the University of Texas at Dallas, where he served as President of the Student Government and received the Student Leader of the Year Award.

After returning to India, he entered active politics and contested the 2004 Lok Sabha election from the Kurukshetra constituency in Haryana as a candidate of the Indian National Congress (INC). He won by a margin of over 130,000 votes, defeating Abhay Singh Chautala. He was re-elected in 2009 and served as a Member of Parliament until 2014. During his tenure, Jindal advocated for issues such as food and nutrition security, women's empowerment, and environmental protection. He introduced a private member bill on food security that contributed to the National Food Security Act. Jindal was named in the coal block allocation case involving the allocation of the Amarkonda Murgadangal coal block in Jharkhand. The CBI filed a final report in 2017 following its investigation.

He lost the 2014 Lok Sabha election to Raj Kumar Saini of the BJP.

=== Joining BJP ===
On 24 March 2024, Jindal resigned from the Indian National Congress and joined the Bharatiya Janata Party (BJP). He was fielded as the BJP candidate for the 2024 general elections from Kurukshetra. He won the election and was elected to the 18th Lok Sabha for a third term.

In this term (2024–present), Jindal is serving as:

- Member, Committee on Commerce (since 26 September 2024)
- Member, Committee on Home Affairs (since 26 September 2024)
- Member, Committee on Estimates (since 14 August 2024)

== Sports ==
=== Polo ===
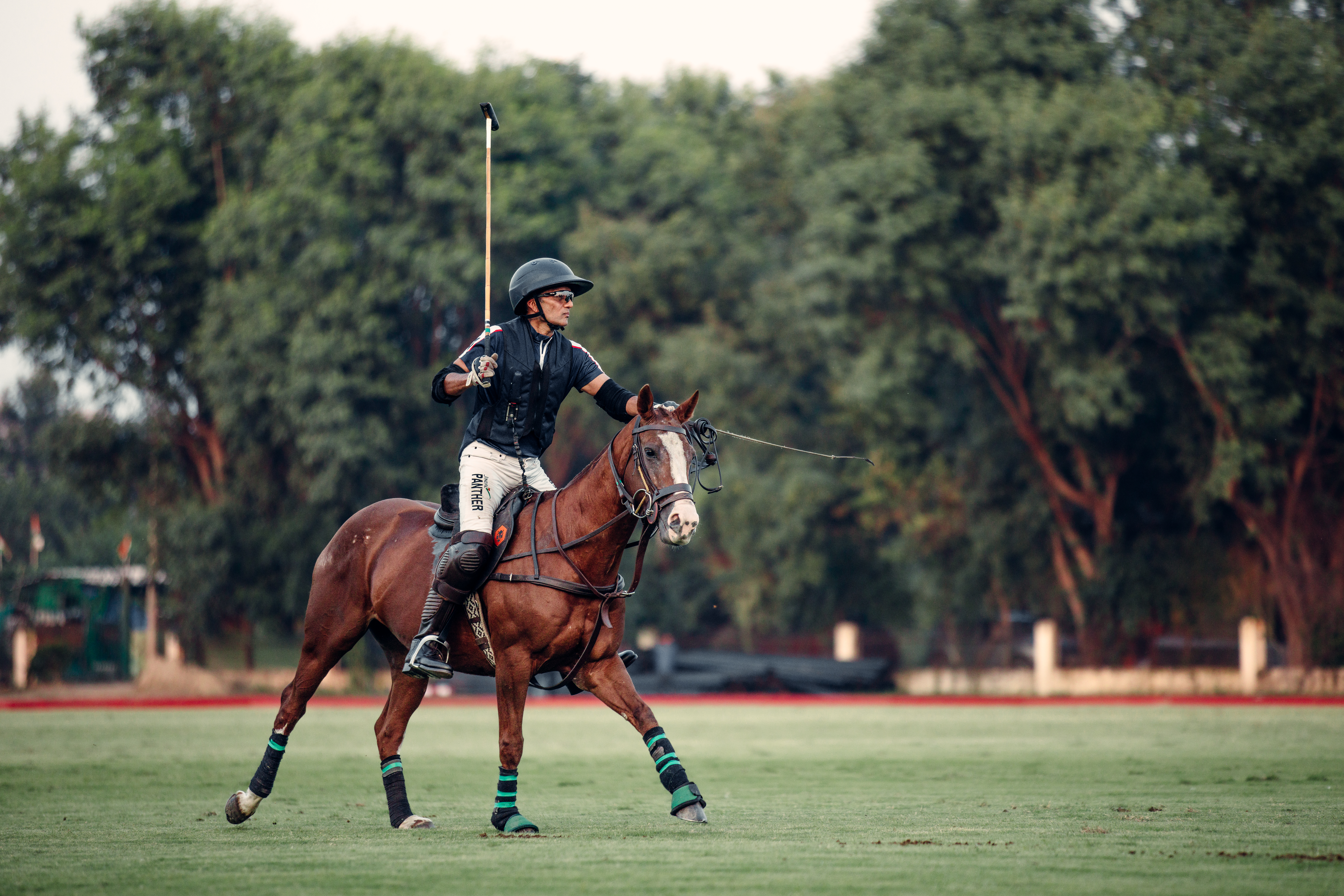
Naveen Jindal playing polo

Naveen Jindal is a long-time polo player and is the Captain and Patron of the Jindal Panther Polo Team. He began playing polo in his youth and established his own team in 1995. His team has participated in and won various tournaments, including the Indian Open, Indian Masters, Maharaja Hari Singh Memorial Cup, and the Bhopal Pataudi Cup. In an interview with *Mint*, Jindal spoke about his early interest in horse riding and how he developed a passion for polo after joining the President’s Estate Polo Club.

=== Shooting ===
Jindal is also a skeet shooter and has represented India at international shooting events. He competed at the 2002 Asian Games held in Busan, South Korea, and captained the Indian shooting team that won a silver medal in the South Asian Federation (SAF) Games in 2004, held in Islamabad, Pakistan.

In 2007, he won a gold medal in the team skeet event at the Singapore Open Shooting Championship. He was also part of the Haryana shooting team that won a gold medal at the 54th National Shooting Championship (Big Bore) in the civilian category held in Gurgaon in May 2011.

=== Other Medals and Events ===
- Bronze medal in the team event at the Singapore Shooting Invitation, 2003
- Silver medal in the team event at the Singapore Shooting Invitation, 2002

== Recognitions ==
- In March 2023, Naveen Jindal was conferred with the Lifetime Achievement Award by the University of Texas at Dallas, his alma mater. He became the second individual to receive this distinction after Nobel Laureate Aziz Sancar. The award recognized his accomplishments in business, politics, and education.
- Jindal received the Justice P.N. Bhagwati Award in 2011, presented by the Capital Foundation in recognition of his contributions to legal education and corporate philanthropy. The award was conferred by former President of India Dr. A.P.J. Abdul Kalam.
- In 2010, he was honored with the Ernst & Young Entrepreneur of the Year Award in the category of Energy and Infrastructure.
- In 2024, he was awarded the Mahatma Hansraj Gaurav Award for his contributions to society, education, and national service.

== Controversy ==
A court in New Delhi on July 25, 2019 framed charges against industrialist Naveen Jindal, his company Jindal Steel and Power Limited and four others in a coal block allocation scam case.47
