= Hisar Assembly constituency =

- Constituency No. 52 for the Haryana Legislative Assembly

Constituency details
- Country: India
- Region: North India
- State: Haryana
- District: Hisar
- Lok Sabha constituency: Hisar
- Established: 1967
- Total electors: 1,80,819
- Reservation: None

Member of Legislative Assembly
- 15th Haryana Legislative Assembly
- Incumbent Savitri Jindal
- Party: Independent
- Elected year: 2024

Hisar Assembly constituency is one of the 90 Vidhan Sabha constituencies in Haryana state in northern India.

== Overview ==
Hisar, constituency number 52, is one of the seven Assembly constituencies located in Hisar district. This constituency covers the Hisar tehsil.

It is part of Hisar Lok Sabha constituency.

== Members of Legislative Assembly ==
Year	Member	Party
1967	S. Lata	Indian National Congress
1968	Balwant Rai Tayal	Bharatiya Kranti Dal
1972	Gulab Singh Dhiman	Indian National Congress
1977	Balwant Rai Tayal	Janata Party
1982	Om Prakash Mahajan	Independent
1987	Hari Singh Saini	Lokdal
1991	Om Prakash Jindal	Haryana Vikas Party
1996	Om Prakash Mahajan	Independent
2000	Om Prakash Jindal	Indian National Congress
2005	Om Prakash Jindal	Indian National Congress
2009	Savitri Jindal	Indian National Congress
2014	Kamal Gupta	Bharatiya Janata Party
2019	Kamal Gupta	Bharatiya Janata Party
2024	Savitri Jindal	Independent

== Election results ==
=== Assembly Election 2024 ===
2024 Haryana Legislative Assembly election: Hisar
Party	Candidate	Votes	%	±%
Independent	Savitri Jindal	49,231	43.76	New
INC	Ram Niwas Rara	30,290	26.93	▼7.41
BJP	Dr. Kamal Gupta	17,385	15.45	▼34.94
Independent	Gautam Sardana	6,831	6.07	New
Independent	Amit Grover	2,014	1.79	New
AAP	Sanjay Satrodia	2,001	1.78	New
Independent	Tarun Jain	1,135	1.01	New
NOTA	None of the Above	421	0.37	▼1.17
Margin of victory		18,941	16.84	▲0.78
Turnout		1,12,494	61.78	▲2.05
Registered electors		1,80,819		▲10.34
Independent gain from BJP		Swing	▼6.63	

=== Assembly Election 2019 ===
2019 Haryana Legislative Assembly election: Hisar
Party	Candidate	Votes	%	±%
BJP	Kamal Gupta	49,675	50.39	▲11.62
INC	Ram Niwas Rara	33,843	34.33	▲8.07
JJP	Jitender Sheoran Manav	6,143	6.23	New
Independent	Amit Grover	2,438	2.47	New
BSP	Manju Dahiya	1,578	1.60	▲1.05
NOTA	Nota	1,523	1.54	New
INLD	Pramod Bagri (Valmiki)	824	0.84	▼4.05
Margin of victory		15,832	16.06	▲3.55
Turnout		98,577	59.73	▼10.33
Registered electors		1,65,025		▲6.01
BJP hold		Swing	▲11.62	

=== Assembly Election 2014 ===
2014 Haryana Legislative Assembly election: Hisar
Party	Candidate	Votes	%	±%
BJP	Kamal Gupta	42,285	38.77	▲35.45
INC	Savitri Jindal	28,639	26.26	▼15.86
HJC(BL)	Gautam Sardana	28,476	26.11	▲7.61
INLD	Bhim Mahajan	5,329	4.89	▼3.48
Independent	Ramesh Verma	698	0.64	New
BSP	Gulab Singh Dhiman	606	0.56	▼0.65
Margin of victory		13,646	12.51	▼6.36
Turnout		1,09,068	70.06	▲3.94
Registered electors		1,55,670		▲31.90
BJP gain from INC		Swing	▼3.35	

=== Assembly Election 2009 ===
2009 Haryana Legislative Assembly election: Hisar
Party	Candidate	Votes	%	±%
INC	Savitri Jindal	32,866	42.12	▼4.99
Independent	Gautam Sardana	18,138	23.24	New
HJC(BL)	Ramniwas Rana	14,437	18.50	New
INLD	Hanuman Aren	6,527	8.36	▲3.88
BJP	Ravi Kumar Saini	2,594	3.32	▲2.34
BSP	Rajender Sharma	944	1.21	▲0.33
Margin of victory		14,728	18.87	▲8.85
Turnout		78,036	66.12	▼0.53
Registered electors		1,18,017		▼27.48
INC hold		Swing	▼4.99	

=== Assembly Election 2005 ===
2005 Haryana Legislative Assembly election: Hisar
Party	Candidate	Votes	%	±%
INC	Om Parkash Jindal	51,097	47.11	▲5.78
Independent	Hari Singh Saini	40,221	37.08	New
INLD	Sumitra Mahajan	4,865	4.49	New
LJP	Bhim Singh Maheshwal	4,367	4.03	New
CPI(M)	Comrade Satvir Singh	1,467	1.35	▲0.28
BJP	Rakesh Sethi	1,072	0.99	▼5.2
BSP	Balwan Arya	954	0.88	New
Independent	Raj Kapoor	793	0.73	New
Independent	Raghbir	583	0.54	New
Margin of victory		10,876	10.03	▼3.63
Turnout		1,08,460	66.65	▲1.54
Registered electors		1,62,731		▲12.25
INC hold		Swing	▲5.78	

=== Assembly Election 2000 ===
2000 Haryana Legislative Assembly election: Hisar
Party	Candidate	Votes	%	±%
INC	Om Parkash Jindal	39,017	41.34	▲12.52
Independent	Hari Singh Saini	26,128	27.68	New
Independent	Om Parkash Mahajan	14,294	15.14	New
BJP	Dr. Kamal Gupta	5,844	6.19	▼15.41
Independent	Yug Dutt Sehtiya	1,971	2.09	New
Independent	Dr. Satbir Singh Dalal	1,055	1.12	New
CPI(M)	Camred Shakuntla Jakhar	1,013	1.07	New
Independent	Babu Lal	929	0.98	New
Independent	Ram Sarup Sailani	677	0.72	New
Independent	Dr. Inderjit	479	0.51	New
Margin of victory		12,889	13.65	▲9.54
Turnout		94,392	65.17	▼0.99
Registered electors		1,44,969		▲3.62
INC gain from Independent		Swing	▲8.41	

=== Assembly Election 1996 ===
1996 Haryana Legislative Assembly election: Hisar
Party	Candidate	Votes	%	±%
Independent	Om Parkash Mahajan	30,451	32.93	New
INC	Hari Singh Saini	26,646	28.81	▼13.62
BJP	Kamal Gupta	19,974	21.60	▲17.89
SAP	Rahul Dev	4,318	4.67	New
Independent	Comrade Satvir Singh	2,559	2.77	New
Independent	Mahinder Singh	1,075	1.16	New
Independent	Surender Pandey	753	0.81	New
BSP	Om Parkash S/O Sheosha Ram	610	0.66	New
Independent	Hans Raj	581	0.63	New
Margin of victory		3,805	4.11	▼1.06
Turnout		92,481	68.00	▲3.56
Registered electors		1,39,911		▲9.87
Independent gain from HVP		Swing	▼14.68	

=== Assembly Election 1991 ===
1991 Haryana Legislative Assembly election: Hisar
Party	Candidate	Votes	%	±%
HVP	Om Parkash Jindal	37,909	47.61	New
INC	Om Parkash Mahajan	33,792	42.44	▲10.14
BJP	Krishan Lal	2,955	3.71	New
JP	Raj Kumar	1,396	1.75	▼28.27
Independent	Jagir Singh	706	0.89	New
Margin of victory		4,117	5.17	▲3.35
Turnout		79,631	64.57	▼5.81
Registered electors		1,27,337		▲15.48
HVP gain from LKD		Swing	▲13.50	

=== Assembly Election 1987 ===
1987 Haryana Legislative Assembly election: Hisar
Party	Candidate	Votes	%	±%
LKD	Hari Singh Saini	25,703	34.11	New
INC	Om Parkash Mahajan	24,335	32.29	▲16
JP	Baldev Tayal	22,622	30.02	▲3.5
Independent	Phul Chand	462	0.61	New
Margin of victory		1,368	1.82	▼4.80
Turnout		75,361	69.41	▼0.26
Registered electors		1,10,264		▲40.07
LKD gain from Independent		Swing	▲0.98	

=== Assembly Election 1982 ===
1982 Haryana Legislative Assembly election: Hisar
Party	Candidate	Votes	%	±%
Independent	Om Parkash Mahajan	17,890	33.13	New
JP	Baldev Tayal	14,320	26.52	▼31.42
INC	Huna Mal Goyal	8,796	16.29	New
Independent	Hari Singh Saini	8,241	15.26	New
Independent	Gulab Singh Dhiman	1,811	3.35	New
BJP	Parkash Chand	665	1.23	New
Independent	Suresh Kumar	387	0.72	New
Margin of victory		3,570	6.61	▼12.35
Turnout		54,004	69.62	▲7.08
Registered electors		78,721		▲25.27
Independent gain from JP		Swing	▼24.80	

=== Assembly Election 1977 ===
1977 Haryana Legislative Assembly election: Hisar
Party	Candidate	Votes	%	±%
JP	Balwant Rai Tayal	22,397	57.93	New
Independent	Om Parkash Jindal	15,065	38.97	New
Independent	Chhabil Das	860	2.22	New
Independent	Shri Ram	339	0.88	New
Margin of victory		7,332	18.96	▲15.39
Turnout		38,661	62.34	▼6.74
Registered electors		62,839		▼7.85
JP gain from INC		Swing	▲9.53	

=== Assembly Election 1972 ===
1972 Haryana Legislative Assembly election: Hisar
Party	Candidate	Votes	%	±%
INC	Gulab Singh Dhiman	22,533	48.40	▲4.46
INC(O)	Balwant Rai Tayal	20,869	44.83	New
Independent	Atma Ram	2,027	4.35	New
Independent	Faqir Chand	700	1.50	New
Independent	Mai Lal	300	0.64	New
Independent	Raghbir Singh	122	0.26	New
Margin of victory		1,664	3.57	▲0.49
Turnout		46,551	69.62	▲9.31
Registered electors		68,195		▲7.10
INC gain from BKD		Swing	▲1.37	

=== Assembly Election 1968 ===
1968 Haryana Legislative Assembly election: Hisar
Party	Candidate	Votes	%	±%
BKD	Balwant Rai Tayal	17,654	47.03	New
INC	Gulab Singh Dhiman	16,495	43.94	▲12.39
JP	Om Parkash Jindal	2,673	7.12	▼7.8
Independent	Jos	715	1.90	New
Margin of victory		1,159	3.09	▲2.46
Turnout		37,537	60.13	▼7.04
Registered electors		63,672		▲17.49
BKD gain from INC		Swing	▲15.48	

=== Assembly Election 1967 ===
1967 Haryana Legislative Assembly election: Hisar
Party	Candidate	Votes	%	±%
INC	S. Lata	11,285	31.55	New
Independent	B. Rai	11,061	30.93	New
SSP	M. Ram	5,446	15.23	New
ABJS	R. Kumar	5,335	14.92	New
Independent	R. Singh	1,680	4.70	New
Independent	P. Singh	602	1.68	New
Independent	R. Kishan	247	0.69	New
Independent	Faqir Chand	111	0.31	New
Margin of victory		224	0.63	
Turnout		35,767	69.75	
Registered electors		54,195		
INC win (new seat)				

== See also ==
- List of constituencies of the Haryana Legislative Assembly
- Hisar district
