= Kurukshetra Lok Sabha constituency =

Lok Sabha Constituency in Haryana, India

Coordinates: 30.0°N 76.9°E

Kurukshetra HR-2
- Lok Sabha constituency
- Interactive Map Outlining Kurukshetra Lok Sabha constituency

Constituency details
- Country: India
- Region: North India
- State: Haryana
- Assembly constituencies: Radaur; Ladwa; Shahbad; Thanesar; Pehowa; Guhla; Kalayat; Kaithal; Pundri
- Established: 1977
- Reservation: None

Member of Parliament
- 18th Lok Sabha
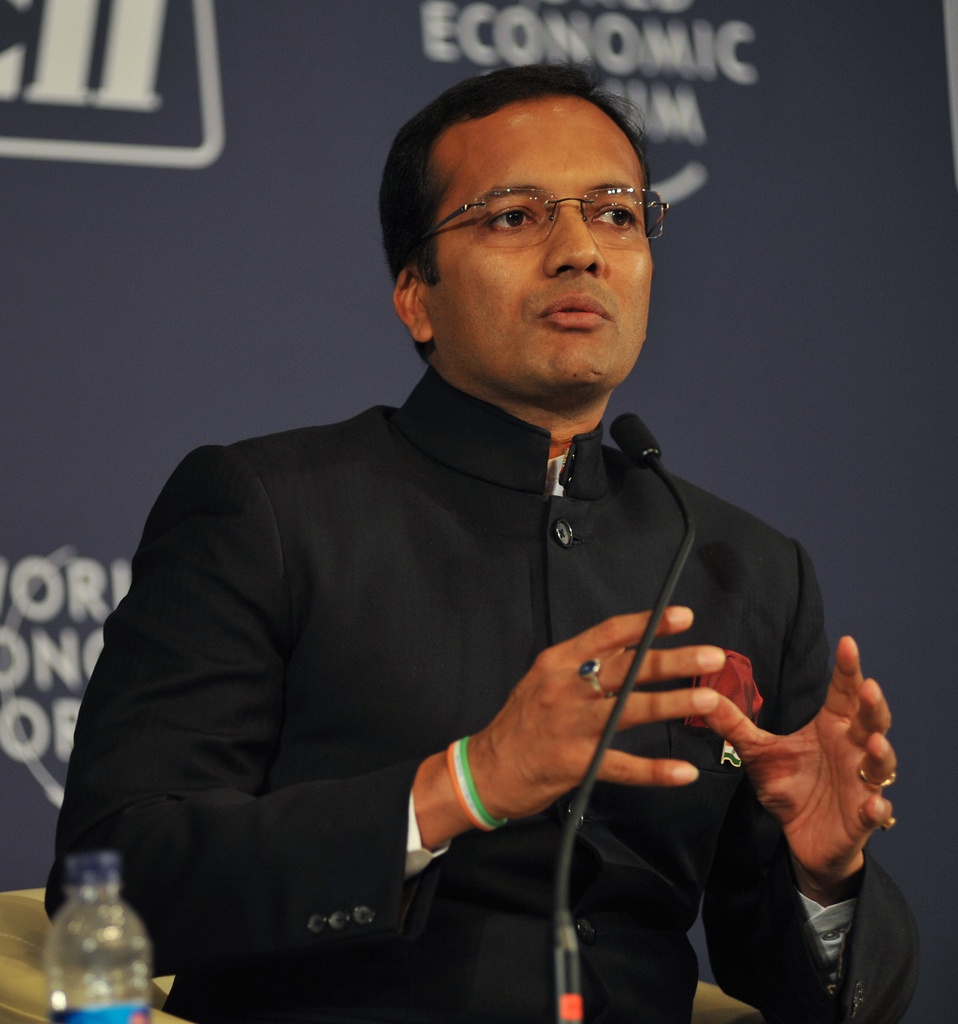
- Incumbent Naveen Jindal
- Party: BJP
- Alliance: NDA
- Elected year: 2024

Kurukshetra Lok Sabha constituency is one of the 10 Lok Sabha (parliamentary) constituencies in Haryana state in India. This constituency covers the entire Kurukshetra and Kaithal districts and part of Yamunanagar district.

Kurukshetra Lok Sabha seat was initially Kaithal Lok Sabha seat and till 1977 its headquarters was also Kaithal. Kurukshetra Lok Sabha seat came into existence in 1977. Elections from 2nd to 5th Lok Sabha were held at Kaithal Lok Sabha seat.

== Assembly segments ==
At present, Kurukshetra Lok Sabha constituency comprises nine Vidhan Sabha (legislative assembly) constituencies. These are:

#	Name	District	Member	Party	Leading (in 2024)
10	Radaur	Yamunanagar	Shyam Singh Rana	BJP	BJP
11	Ladwa	Kurukshetra	Nayab Singh Saini	BJP	BJP
12	Shahbad (SC)	Kurukshetra	Ram Karan	INC	AAP
13	Thanesar	Kurukshetra	Ashok Kumar Arora	INC	BJP
14	Pehowa	Kurukshetra	Mandeep Chatha	INC	AAP
15	Guhla (SC)	Kaithal	Devender Hans	INC	AAP
16	Kalayat	Kaithal	Vikas Saharan	INC	AAP
17	Kaithal	Kaithal	Aditya Surjewala	INC	BJP
18	Pundri	Kaithal	Satpal Jamba	BJP	BJP

== Members of Parliament ==
Year	Winner	Party
1957	Mool Chand Jain	Indian National Congress
1962	Dev Dutt Puri	Indian National Congress
1967	Gulzarilal Nanda	Indian National Congress
1971	Gulzarilal Nanda	Indian National Congress
1977	Raghubir Singh Virk	Janata Party
1980	Manohar Lal Saini	Janata Party (Secular)
1984	Sardar Harpal Singh	Indian National Congress
1989	Gurdial Singh Saini	Janata Dal
1991	Tara Singh	Indian National Congress
1996	Om Prakash Jindal	Haryana Vikas Party
1998	Kailasho Devi Saini	Indian National Lok Dal
1999	Kailasho Devi Saini	Indian National Lok Dal
2004	Naveen Jindal	Indian National Congress
2009	Naveen Jindal	Indian National Congress
2014	Raj Kumar Saini	Bharatiya Janata Party
2019	Nayab Singh Saini	Bharatiya Janata Party
2024	Naveen Jindal	Bharatiya Janata Party

== Election results ==
=== 2024 ===
2024 Indian general elections: Kurukshetra
Party	Candidate	Votes	%	±%
BJP	Naveen Jindal	542,175	44.96	▼11.02
AAP	Sushil Gupta	5,13,154	42.55	New
INLD	Abhay Singh Chautala	78,708	6.53	▲1.60
BSP	Deepak Mehra	20,944	1.74	▼4.41
Independent	Jai Kumar Saini Hamidpur	8,093	0.67	New
JJP	Pala Ram Saini	6,182	0.51	▼5.06
NOTA	None of the Above	2,439	0.20	
Majority		29,021	2.41	▼28.86
Turnout		12,06,961	67.06	▼7.23
BJP hold		Swing	▼11.02	

=== 2019 ===
2019 Indian general elections: Kurukshetra
Party	Candidate	Votes	%	±%
BJP	Nayab Singh Saini	686,588	55.98	▲19.17
INC	Nirmal Singh	3,03,722	24.71	▼0.62
BSP	Shashi	75,533	6.15	▲0.08
JJP	Jai Bhagwan Sharma	68,437	5.57	new
INLD	Arjun Chautala	60,574	4.93	▼20.46
Majority		3,84,591	31.27	▲19.85
Turnout		12,31,165	74.29	▼1.51
BJP hold		Swing		

=== 2014 ===
2014 Indian general elections: Kurukshetra
Party	Candidate	Votes	%	±%
BJP	Raj Kumar Saini	418,112	36.81	▲36.81
INLD	Balbir Saini	2,88,376	25.39	▼6.42
INC	Naveen Jindal	2,87,722	25.33	▼20.04
BSP	Chhattar Singh	68,926	6.07	▼11.20
NOTA	None of the above	2,482	0.22	N/A
Majority		1,29,736	11.42	▼2.14
Turnout		11,35,892	75.80	▲0.76
BJP gain from INC		Swing	▲36.81	

=== 2009 ===
2009 Indian general elections: Kurukshetra
Party	Candidate	Votes	%	±%
INC	Naveen Jindal	397,204	45.36	
INLD	Ashok Kumar Arora	2,78,475	31.80	
BSP	Gurdyal Singh Saini	1,51,231	17.27	
HJC(BL)	Jaswant Singh Cheema	16,839	1.92	
Majority		1,18,729	13.56	
Turnout		8,75,536	75.04	
INC hold		Swing		

== See also ==
- Kurukshetra district
- List of constituencies of the Lok Sabha
