= Tamnar =

- Town
- Location in Chhattisgarh, India
- Coordinates: 22.08°N 83.44°E
- Country: India
- State: Chhattisgarh
- District: Raigarh
- Elevation: 240 m (790 ft)

Population (2011)
  - Total: 5,465

Languages
  - Official: Hindi, Chhattisgarhi
- Time zone: UTC+5:30 (IST)
- PIN: 496107
- Vehicle registration: CG 13

Tamnar is a town, gram panchayat, and tehsil headquarters in Raigarh district in the Indian state of Chhattisgarh. Situated in the coal-rich Mand-Raigarh basin, it is one of the primary thermal power generation and coal-mining centres in eastern Chhattisgarh.

== History ==
Prior to Indian independence, the Tamnar region formed part of the Raigarh princely state. Following the integration of the princely states of Raigarh, Sarangarh, Udaipur (Dharamjaigarh), and Jashpur in 1948, the area was incorporated into the newly established Raigarh district of the Central Provinces and Berar (later Madhya Pradesh). On 1 November 2000, Tamnar became part of the newly carved state of Chhattisgarh under the Madhya Pradesh Reorganisation Act, 2000.

Historically a rural agrarian and forest settlement inhabited significantly by indigenous tribal communities, Tamnar underwent rapid industrial transformation in the late 2000s with the allocation of the Gare Pelma coal blocks and the commissioning of Jindal Power Limited's mega thermal power project in 2007–2008. Administratively, Tamnar functions as the headquarters of the Tamnar Tehsil and Community Development Block within Raigarh district, falling under the Lailunga Assembly constituency and the Raigarh Lok Sabha constituency.

== Geography and climate ==
Tamnar is located at 22.08°N 83.44°E, at an average elevation of 215 to 240 metres (705 to 787 ft) above mean sea level. It lies approximately 35 to 48.9 kilometres north of the district headquarters at Raigarh, along the course of the Kelo River, a tributary of the Mahanadi. The town spans a total geographical area of 1,229.24 hectares (12.29 km^{2}). Of this area, roughly 380.83 hectares (31.0%) represent net sown agricultural land, 498.42 hectares (40.5%) consist of fallow land, 253.09 hectares (20.6%) are dedicated to non-agricultural and industrial use, and 70.51 hectares (5.7%) comprise pastures and grazing land. The surrounding natural vegetation is characterized by tropical moist deciduous forests dominated by Sal (Shorea robusta), alongside Terminalia alata and Bauhinia racemosa.

Tamnar experiences a tropical wet and dry climate typical of eastern Chhattisgarh, marked by hot, dry summers, a prominent southwest monsoon, and mild winters.

- Summer (March to May): Temperatures rise sharply, ranging between 29.5 °C (85.1 °F) and a maximum of up to 49 °C (120 °F) during peak pre-monsoon heatwaves.
- Monsoon (June to September): The region receives the bulk of its annual rainfall (averaging approximately 1,584 mm across the district) from the southwest monsoon, with temperatures moderating from 38 °C (100 °F) in June to around 24.5 °C (76.1 °F) in September.
- Winter (December to February): Winters are pleasant and dry, with minimum temperatures dropping to between 8 °C (46 °F) and 13.2 °C (55.8 °F) in December and January.

== Demographics ==
According to the 2011 Census of India, Tamnar had a total population of 5,465 (2,771 males and 2,694 females) residing in 1,307 households. The town recorded a sex ratio of 972 females per 1,000 males, slightly below the Chhattisgarh state average of 991. Children aged 0–6 years numbered 712 (369 boys and 343 girls), accounting for 13.03% of the total population. Scheduled Tribes (ST) constituted 22.67% (1,239 individuals) of the population, while Scheduled Castes (SC) accounted for 4.14% (226 individuals).

Tamnar recorded a high overall literacy rate of 83.23% in 2011 (3,956 literate persons), substantially exceeding the state average of 70.28% and the Raigarh district average of 73.26%. Male literacy stood at 90.22% (2,167 males), while female literacy was 76.10% (1,789 females).

At the sub-district level, the broader Tamnar Tehsil covers an area of 591.5 km^{2} and had a total rural population of 97,975 (49,342 males and 48,633 females) as of the 2011 Census. Chhattisgarhi and Hindi are the primary languages spoken in the town, alongside regional use of Odia and Kurukh.

== Economy ==
Tamnar's economy is driven by a combination of heavy industrial operations—primarily coal mining and thermal power generation—and traditional agriculture.

The town lies in the heart of the Mand-Raigarh coalfield and hosts several major open-cast and underground coal blocks, particularly within the Gare Pelma sector. Notably, the Gare Pelma-III coal mine in Tamnar, allotted to the Chhattisgarh State Power Generation Company Limited (CSPGCL), has a sanctioned production capacity of 40 million tonnes per annum (MTPA) and commenced operations in December 2019. Tamnar is also home to Jindal Power Limited's (JPL) O.P. Jindal Super Thermal Power Plant, which has a total installed capacity of 3,400 MW, comprising Stage I (4 × 250 MW = 1,000 MW) and Stage II (4 × 600 MW = 2,400 MW). Coal transportation and auxiliary industrial services between mines such as the Gare Pelma blocks and nearby Kulda open-cast mines to thermal plants in Tamnar provide substantial non-agricultural employment, though heavy vehicular movement has also prompted environmental oversight regarding road infrastructure and dust management.

According to the 2011 Census, the working population of Tamnar town stood at 1,942 (35.5% of the total population), of whom 83.99% were engaged in main work (employment for more than six months per year) and 16.01% were engaged in marginal work. Within the main workforce, 163 workers were recorded as agricultural cultivators and 256 as agricultural labourers, with the remainder employed in mining, power generation, trade, and services. Financial and civic infrastructure in the town includes a branch of the State Bank of India, ATM services, a sub-post office (PIN 496107), and a Community Health Centre (CHC).

== Education ==
Tamnar serves as the principal educational hub for students from surrounding rural settlements in the Tamnar block, such as Basanpali, Mahloi, Godhi, Kasdol, and Hamirpur.

=== Higher education ===
- Government College, Tamnar: Established in 2008 and recognised under Section 2(f) of the UGC (AISHE Code: C-22380), the college is affiliated with Shaheed Nandkumar Patel Vishwavidyalaya, Raigarh (having previously been affiliated with Atal Bihari Vajpayee Vishwavidyalaya, Bilaspur). Spread across a 4-acre campus, it offers undergraduate degrees in Arts (B.A.), Science (B.Sc.), and Commerce (B.Com.), as well as postgraduate programmes including M.A. (Hindi, Political Science, Sociology), M.Sc. (Chemistry, Botany, Zoology), and M.Com.

=== Primary and secondary schools ===
Notable primary, middle, and higher secondary schools operating in and around Tamnar include:

- O.P. Jindal School, Urjanagar (Tamnar)
- St. Ann's Higher Secondary School, Basanpali (Tamnar)
- Government Boys Higher Secondary School, Tamnar
- Government Girls High School, Barbhata Chowk, Tamnar
- Saraswati Shishu Mandir, Tamnar
- Adarsh Gramyaobharti Vidya Mandir, Tamnar
- Sahyog Vidya Mandir, Tamnar
- Laxmi Devi Public School, Kasdol (Tamnar)
