= Jindal Steel =

Indian multinational steel and infrastructure company

Jindal Steel Limited
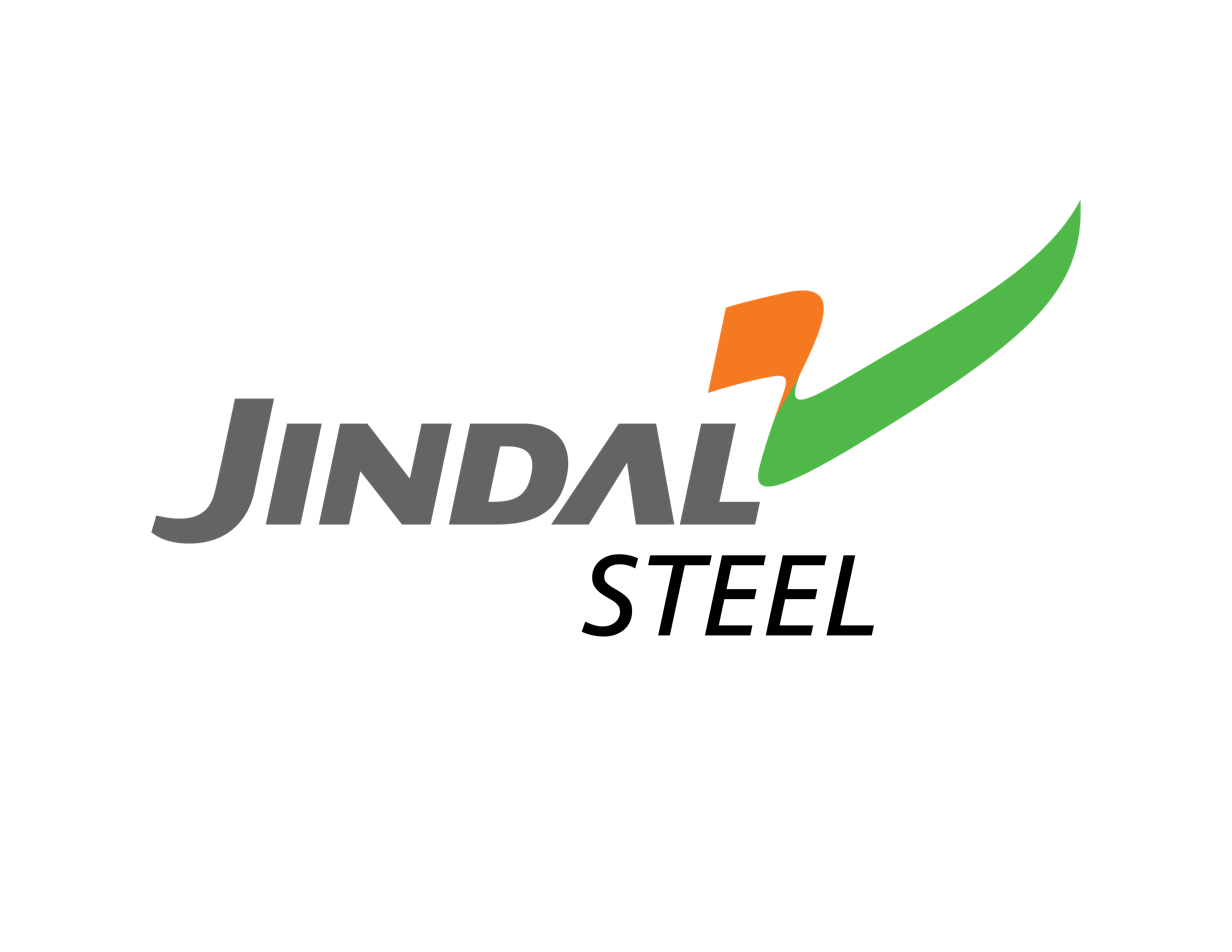

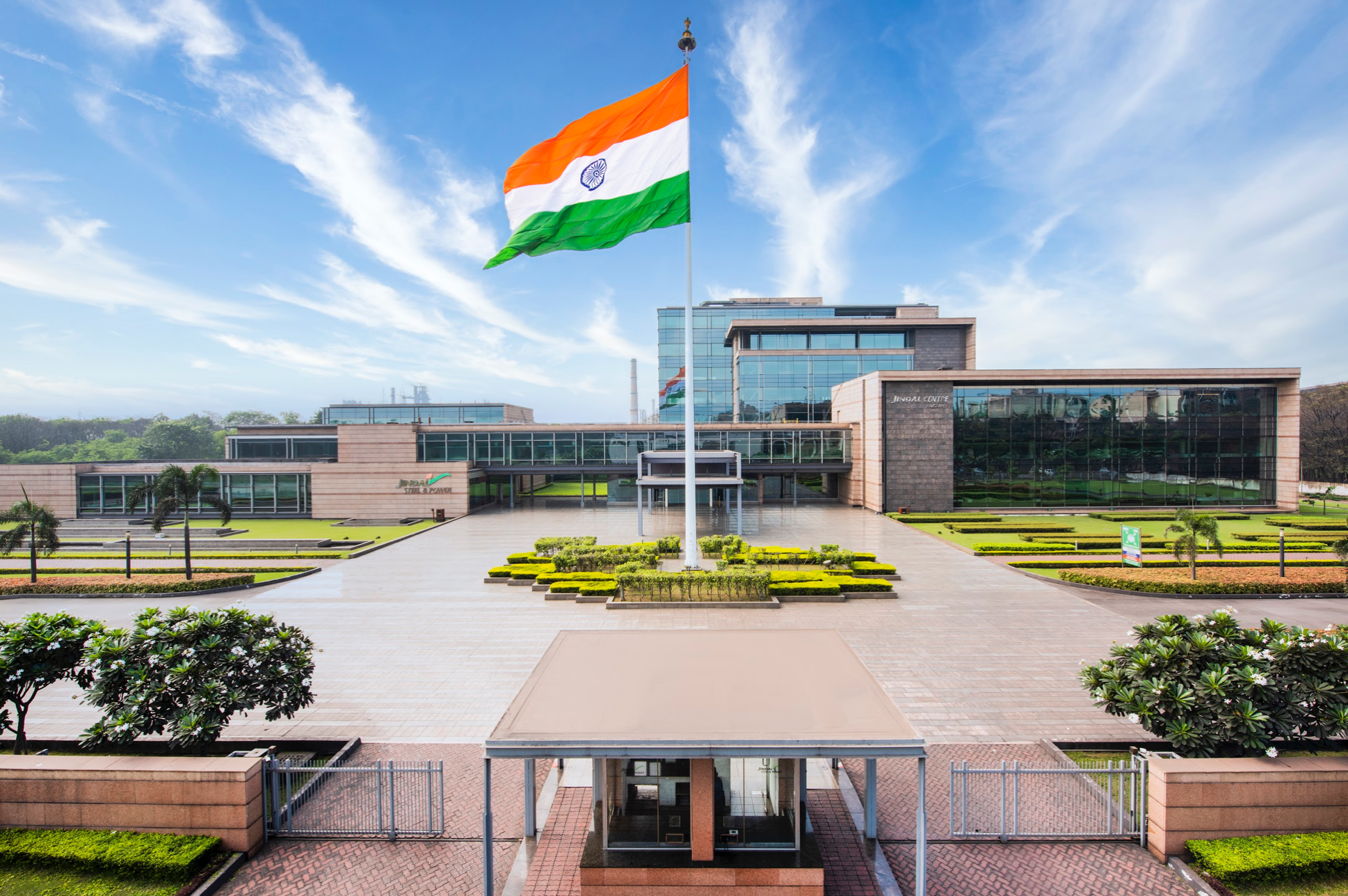
- Type: Public
- Traded as: BSE: 532286; NSE: JINDALSTEL
- ISIN: INE749A01030
- Industry: Steel, Energy
- Founder: O P Jindal
- Headquarters: New Delhi, India
- Area served: Worldwide
- Key people: Naveen Jindal (Chairman); Bimlendra Jha (MD)
- Products: Steel, Iron, Electricity generation and distribution
- Revenue: ▼₹50,183 crore (US$5.2 billion) (2024)
- Operating income: ▲₹6,241 crore (US$650 million) (2024)
- Net income: ▲₹5,943 crore (US$620 million) (2024)
- Total assets: ▲₹78,715 crore (US$8.2 billion) (2024)
- Total equity: ▲₹44,750 crore (US$4.6 billion) (2024)
- Number of employees: 11,178 (including 4,807 non permanent)(2024)
- Subsidiaries: Jindal Petroleum Limited; Vulcan Green Steel; Jindal Cement; Jindal Panther TMT Rebars; Jindal Infosolutions Ltd; Jindal Synfuels Ltd; Jindal Minerals & Metals; Jindal Power; Raigarh Pathalgaon Expressway Ltd.
- Website: jindalsteel.com

Jindal Steel Limited is an Indian steel company based in New Delhi. Jindal Steel Limited is a part of OP Jindal Group.

In terms of tonnage, it is the third-largest private steel producer in India and the only private player in India to produce rails. The company manufactures and sells sponge iron, mild steel slabs, rails, mild steel, structural, hot rolled plates, iron ore pellets, and coils. Jindal Steel set up the world's first MXCOL plant at Angul, Odisha that uses the locally available and cheap high-ash coal and turns it into synthesis gas for steel making, reducing the dependence on imported coking coal.

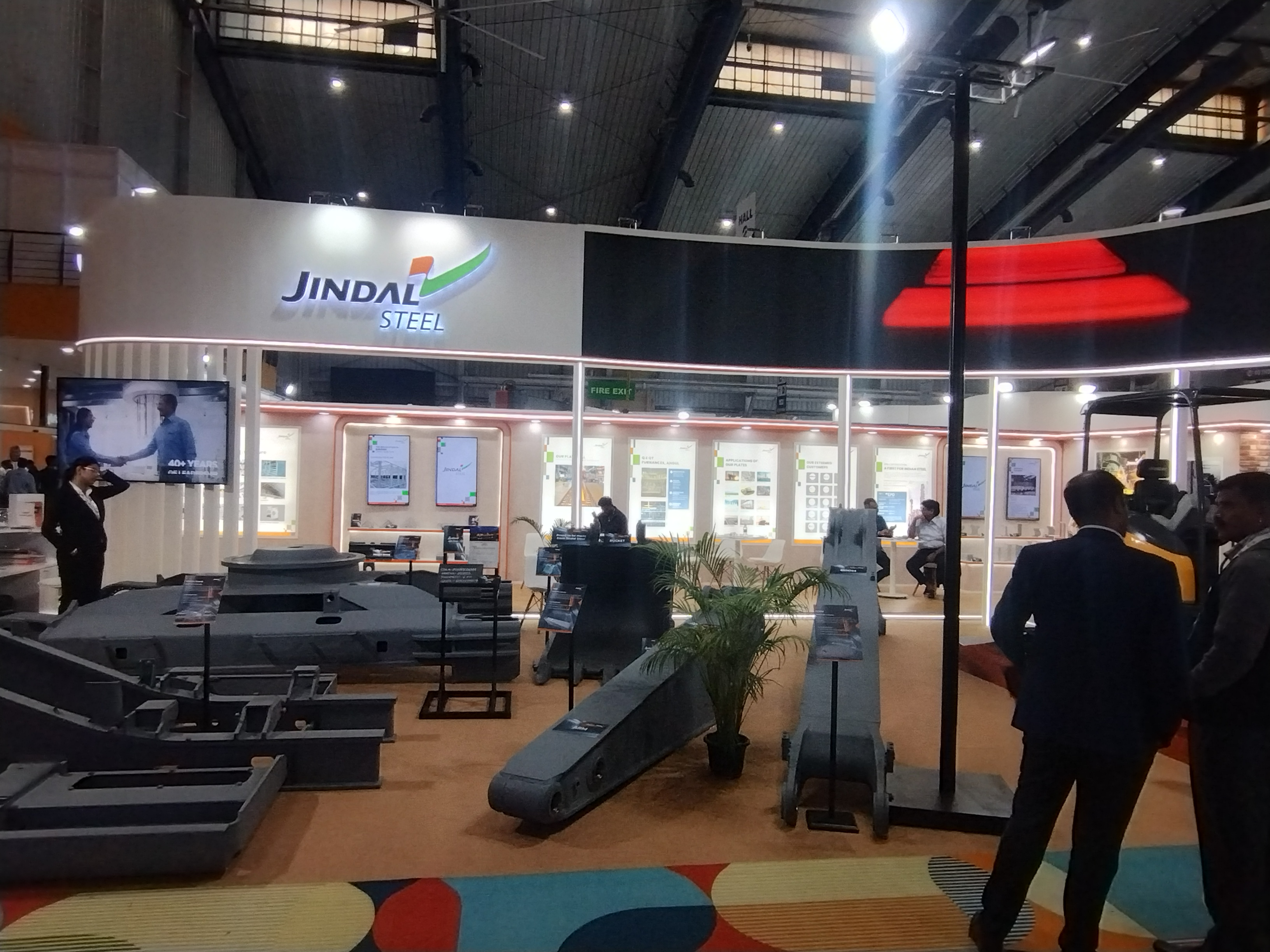
Jindal Steel at EXCON 2025, BIEC

== Operations ==
=== Angul ===
In 2022, Union Steel Minister Ram Chandra Prasad Singh inaugurated Jindal Steel's 1.4 MTPA TMT rebar mill at its integrated complex in Odisha's Angul district. One of the most advanced steel plants in the world and India’s only steel plant using a coal gasification-based route to produce syngas-based DRI, Angul is designed for end-to-end value creation and low-carbon energy integration.

=== Barbil ===
Jindal Steel's pellet plant at Barbil has a total installed capacity of 9 MTPA production for different pellet grades. The plant includes a dry grinding facility that harnesses the recuperation type of straight grate technology.

=== Patratu ===
Jindal Steel's manufacturing facility at Patratu, Jharkhand has a total finished steel capacity of 1.6 MTPA.

=== Nalwa Steel and Power ===
Nalwa Steel and Power Limited (NSPL) is an integrated steel plant in Raigarh, Chhattisgarh, India with a capacity of 0.36 million tons of finished steel per year.

== Listings and shareholding ==
The equity shares of Jindal Steel Limited are listed on the Bombay Stock Exchange and the National Stock Exchange of India.

Shareholding: On 31 March 2022, the promoter group Jindal Group held 60.5% of its equity shares. 27% of the shares were owned by the Institutional Investors. Public shareholders own approx. 12.5% of its shares.

Shareholders (as of 31-March-2022)	Shareholding
Promoter Group (Jindal Family)	60.45%
Foreign Institutional Investors (FII)/NRI/OCB/Trusts/Foreign national	9.7%
Public	12.5%
Financial Institutions/Banks/Mutual Funds/UTI/Insurance companies/Central Government	27%
Total	100.0%

The company officially changed its name from Jindal Steel and Power to Jindal Steel Ltd. on 23 July, 2025.

== Initiatives ==
Jindal Panther TMT Rebars
Jindal Steel has forayed into the construction retail industry with the launch of Jindal Panther TMT Rebars for the housing segment. These rebars are manufactured in 1.0 MTPA capacity TMT Rebar mill at Patratu, Jharkhand, supplied by Siemens.

Jindal Institute of Power Technology (JIPT)
JIPT was established to develop a pool of technically trained power plant professionals for power utilities in India and abroad. The course authorizes the pass-outs to operate or undertake maintenance of any part or whole of generating stations of capacity 100 MW & above together with the associated substations.

It is promoted by Jindal Education & Welfare Society, which is supported by Jindal Power Limited. The Institute possesses a simulator of 250 MW/600 MW generating units. JIPT is located in the 4X250, 4X600 MW Jindal Tamnar Thermal Power Plant in Tamnar, Raigarh, Chhattisgarh.

== Controversies ==
=== Involvement in coalgate scam ===
Jindal Steel was one of the two private companies to get a coal field in February 2009. JSL got the Talcher coal field in Angul with reserves of 150 crore (1,500 million) metric tonnes after the cut-off date by the Central Government, while the Government-run Navratna Coal India Ltd was refused.

Both the blocks were in Odisha, with a combined worth of over ₹2 lakh crore, and were meant for liquification of coal. The opposition parties alleged that the Government violated all norms in granting the coal fields. Naveen Jindal, however, denied any wrongdoing.

=== Iron ore reserve mining in Bolivia ===
On 3 June 2006, Bolivia granted development rights for one of the world's largest iron ore reserves in the El Mutún region to Jindal Steel. With an initial investment of US$1.5 billion, the company plans to invest an additional US$2.1 billion over the next eight years in the South American country.

Jindal Steel is likely to terminate the contract of investing $2.1 billion in setting up a steel plant in Bolivia, due to non-fulfilment of contractual obligations by the Bolivian Government.

In 2024, the International Court of Arbitration of the International Chamber of Commerce ruled in favor of Bolivia against the Indian company Jindal Steel Bolivia S.A. (JSB) that demanded compensation of 100 million dollars from the Bolivian State for the Mutún project, which is about to be completed in Santa Cruz.

The court, in its ruling, dismissed JSB's claims and declared that Empresa Siderúrgica de El Mutún (ESM) complied with all of its contractual obligations in good faith under Bolivian law. In addition, it determined that the Indian transnational must assume the costs of the arbitration, which amount to 740 thousand dollars, and pay the ESM more than 1.9 million dollars in costs and expenses, plus interest based on the yield of the bonds of the United States Treasury.
