= Belgium–India relations =

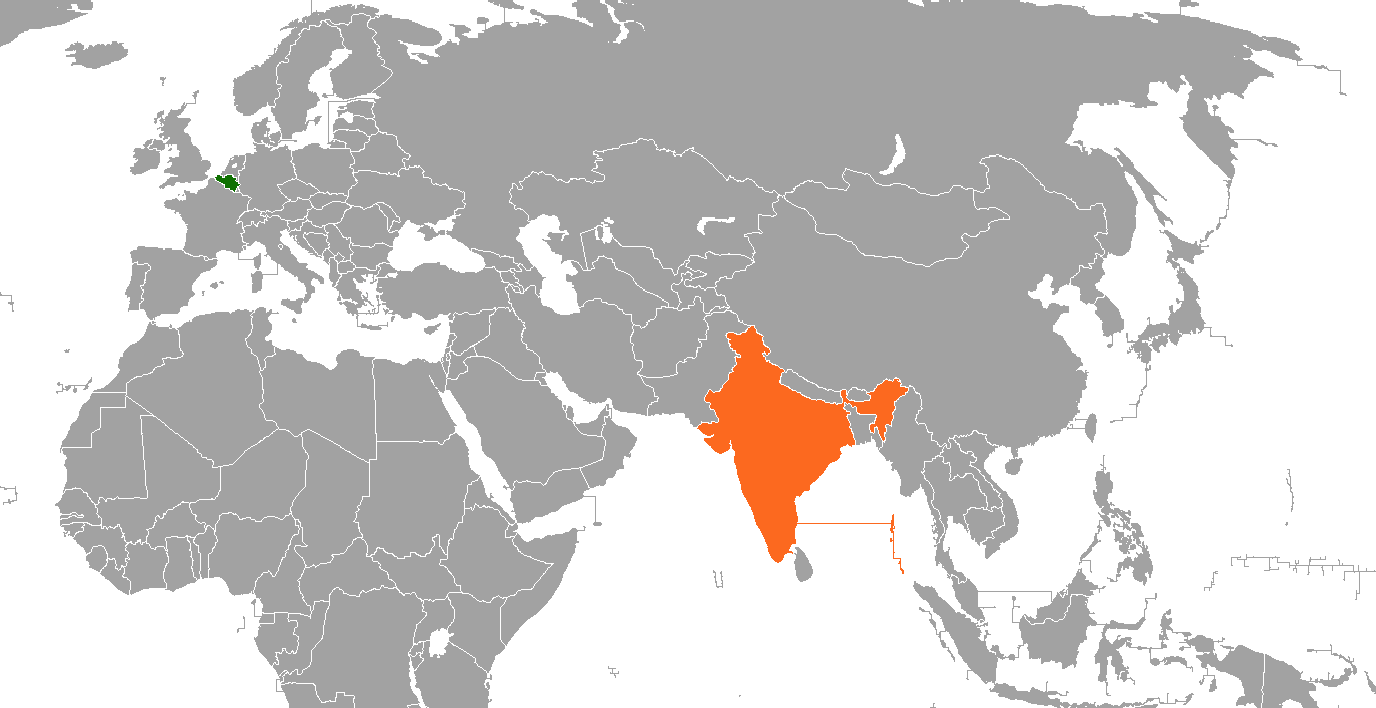
- Belgium: India

Diplomatic mission
- Embassy of Belgium, New Delhi: Embassy of India, Brussels

Envoy
- Belgian Ambassador to India Didier Vanderhasselt: Indian Ambassador to Belgium Pranay Verma

Belgium–India relations are the bilateral ties between the India and the Kingdom of Belgium. India's Embassy in Brussels was opened in 1948. Belgium's embassy in New Delhi was opened in 1947. Its current complex, built in 1984, is an architectural marvel designed by Satish Gujral.

Belgium being India's eight largest trading partner as of 2009, accounting for trade of nearly ₹41,552 crore. India and Belgium share the common value of "democracy, pluralism and rule of law" and Belgium has supported the G4 nations. The former deputy Prime Minister of Belgium Steven Vanackere had said that "slowly but surely" India was getting its "rightful place in global governance". He reiterated that Belgium "unequivocally" reconfirmed its support for India's bid for a permanent seat in the enlarged United Nations Security Council.

== Bilateral trade ==
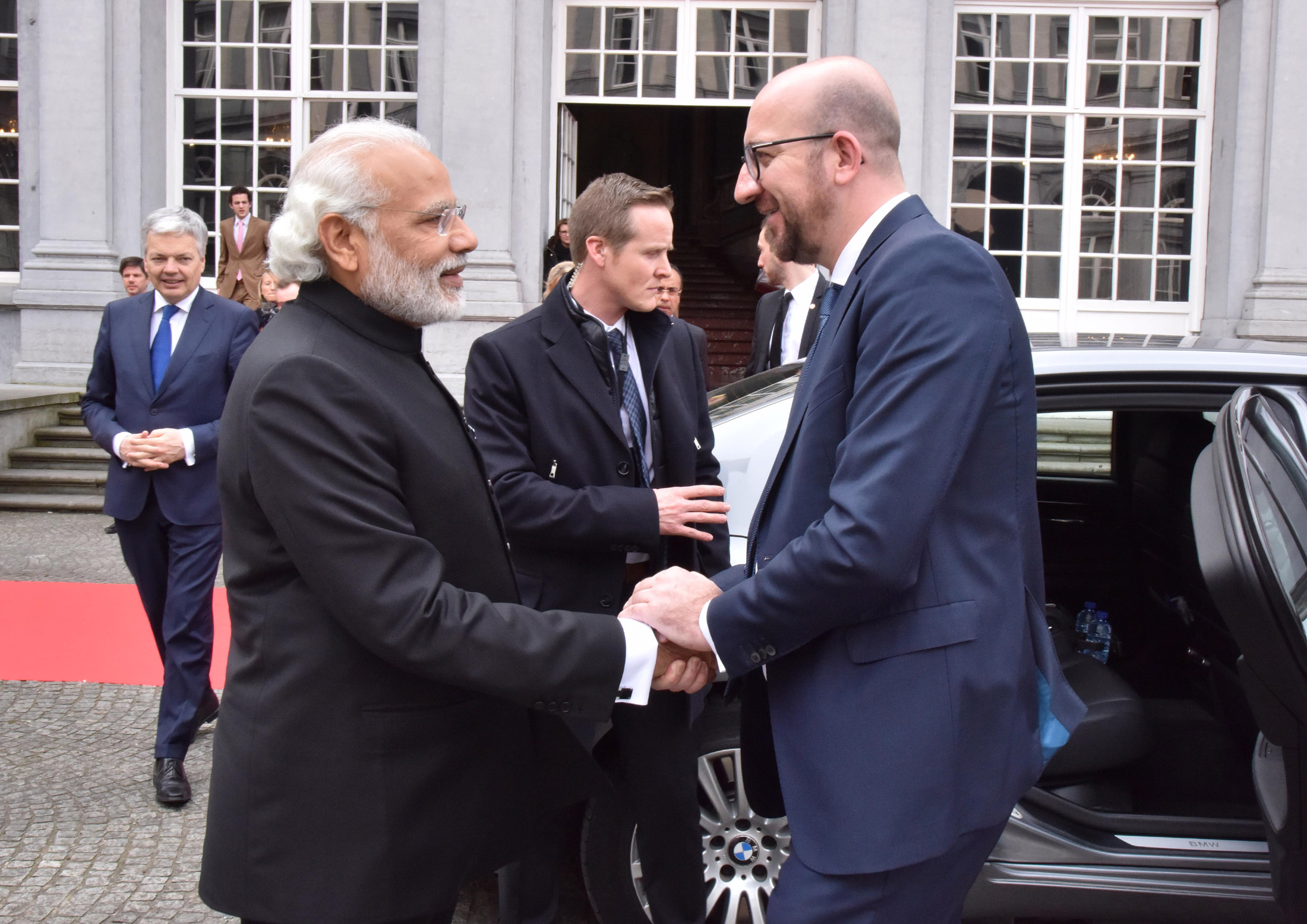
Indian PM Narendra Modi with Belgian PM Charles Michel, Brussels, 2016

India and Belgium have strong trading links, with India being the second largest importer of and fifth largest exporter to Belgian products. In 2008, the Government of India spoke about how Belgium and India were "partners in a globalised world". In November 2017, King Phillipe and Queen Mathilde of Belgium visited India for seven days.

There are many Indian diamond merchants from Gujarat and Rajasthan in Antwerp.

== Diplomatic missions ==
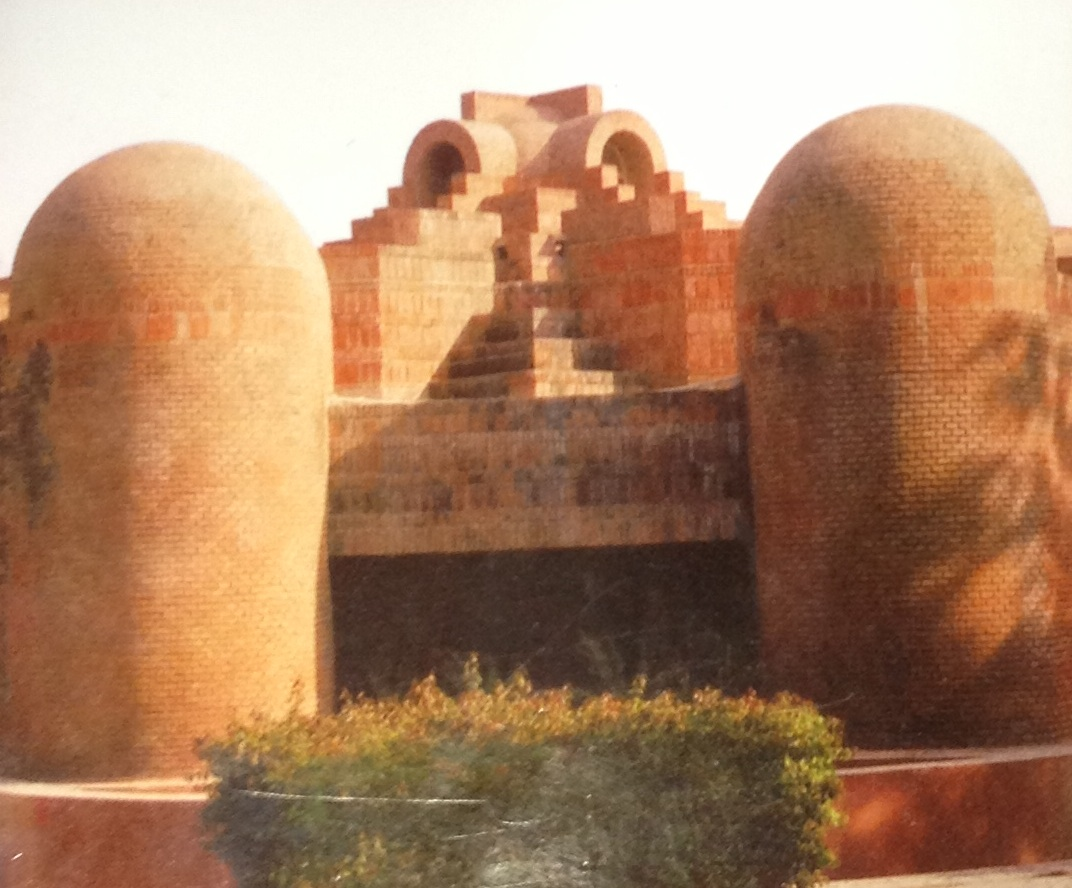
The Belgian Embassy at Shantipath, Chanakyapuri, New Delhi

Apart from the Embassy of Belgium, New Delhi, the Belgian Government has further opened two Consulates-General and two Honorary Consulates: in Mumbai, Chennai, Kolkata and Ahmedabad. The Mumbai Consulate General is located at Bandra-Kurla Complex, the Chennai Consulate General at Khader Nawaz Khan Road – Nungambakkam, the Kolkata Honorary Consulate at Camac Street (Abanindranath Thakur Sarani), while the latest one, opened on 26 April 2017, is at GIFT City, Ahmedabad. Opening the Honorary Consulate made Belgium the first country to do so at India's first International Financial Services Centre (IFSC).

The Embassy of India, Brussels is located at Chaussee de Vleurgat 217, 1050 Brussels, Belgium. India also has its honorary consulates in Antwerp (Belgium) and Capellen (Luxembourg).

== See also ==
- Foreign relations of Belgium
- Foreign relations of India
