= Embassy of Belgium, New Delhi =

Diplomatic mission in India

Embassy of Belgium, New Delhi.
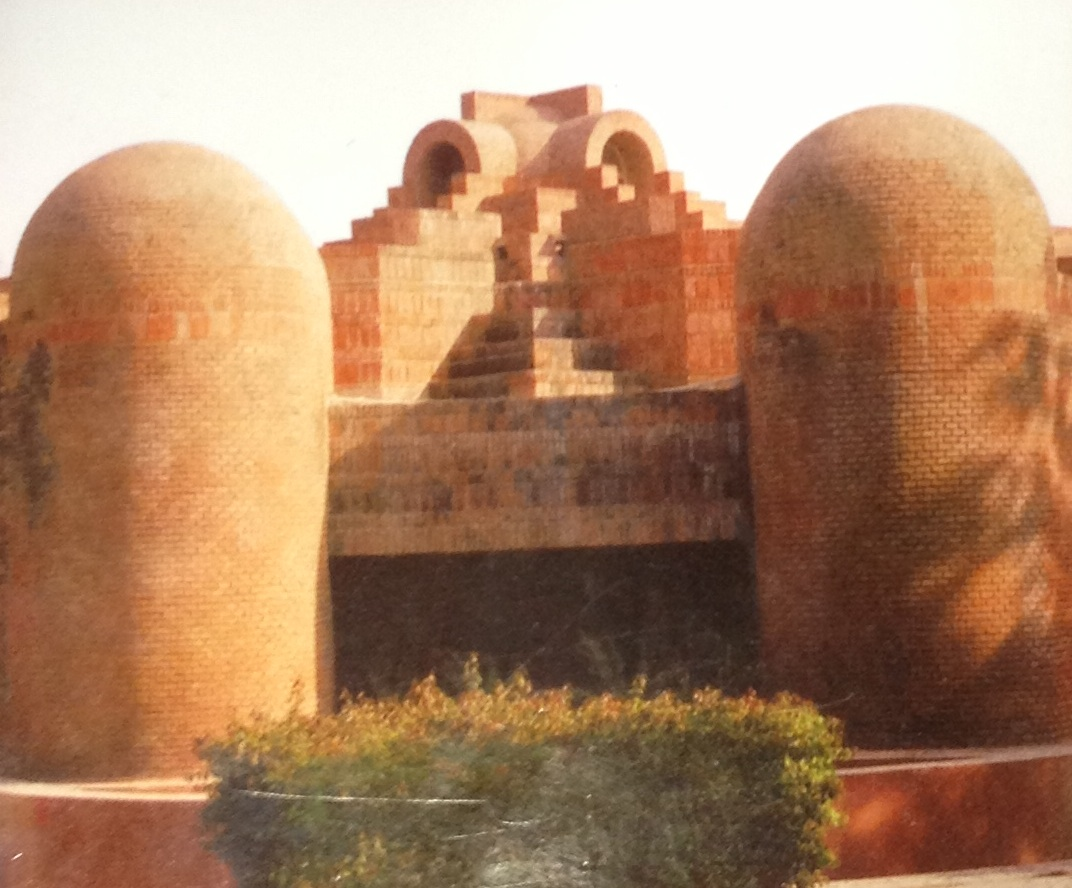
- Address: 50-N, Shantipath, Chanakyapuri, New Delhi, Delhi 110021
- Coordinates: 28°35′11″N 77°11′2″E
- Ambassador: Didier Vanderhasselt
- Website: Official website

The Embassy of Belgium in New Delhi is the diplomatic mission of the Kingdom of Belgium to India. The embassy is located at Shantipath, Chanakyapuri. The Embassy of Belgium in New Delhi covers the services for India, Sri Lanka, Bangladesh, the Maldives, Bhutan and Nepal. Belgium also operates a consulate in Mumbai and Chennai. The Belgian ambassador to India is Didier Vanderhasselt.

Belgium had opened its embassy in India in 1947, just a few months after India's independence. Its first ambassador to India was Eugène, 11th Prince of Ligne.

The construction of the current embassy complex (seen in picture) was designed and managed by Satish Gujral, and completed in 1984. The design resembles a fortress of rocky outcrops. The building complex includes the administrative buildings of the embassy, chancellor's residence, ambassador's residence, and staff housing. The embassy was one of Satish Gujral's most challenging assignments, winning him national and international awards. In 2000, the building was recognised as one of the 1000 best buildings of the 20th century

The embassy is located in New Delhi's diplomatic neighbourhood of Chanakyapuri. The front facade consists of two large cupolas with a central fold above the entrance. The entrance opens into a courtyard with stone masonry and greenery within. The building is constructed with red bricks. The ubiquitous red brick construction of the building has been compared to early architectural forms prevalent in Mohenjo-daro and the buddhist architecture in Sanchi and Nalanda. Along with two other embassies, the post-modern architecture of the Belgian embassy in New Delhi has been critiqued by Roger Connah for its confusing appeal to pre-colonial glory of Delhi on one hand and the fading (British) empire on the other. Some parts of the building near the entrance are open to visitors, while the parts hosting the residence and the administrative blocks are not accessible to the public.

== Ambassadors ==
The current ambassador is Didier Vanderhasselt. The ambassador until 2018 was Jan Luykx and until 2022 Francois Delhaye.

== See also ==
- Belgium–India relations
- List of diplomatic missions in India
- List of diplomatic missions of Belgium
- Foreign relations of India
- Foreign relations of Belgium
