= Palika Kendra =

21-story building in New Delhi, India

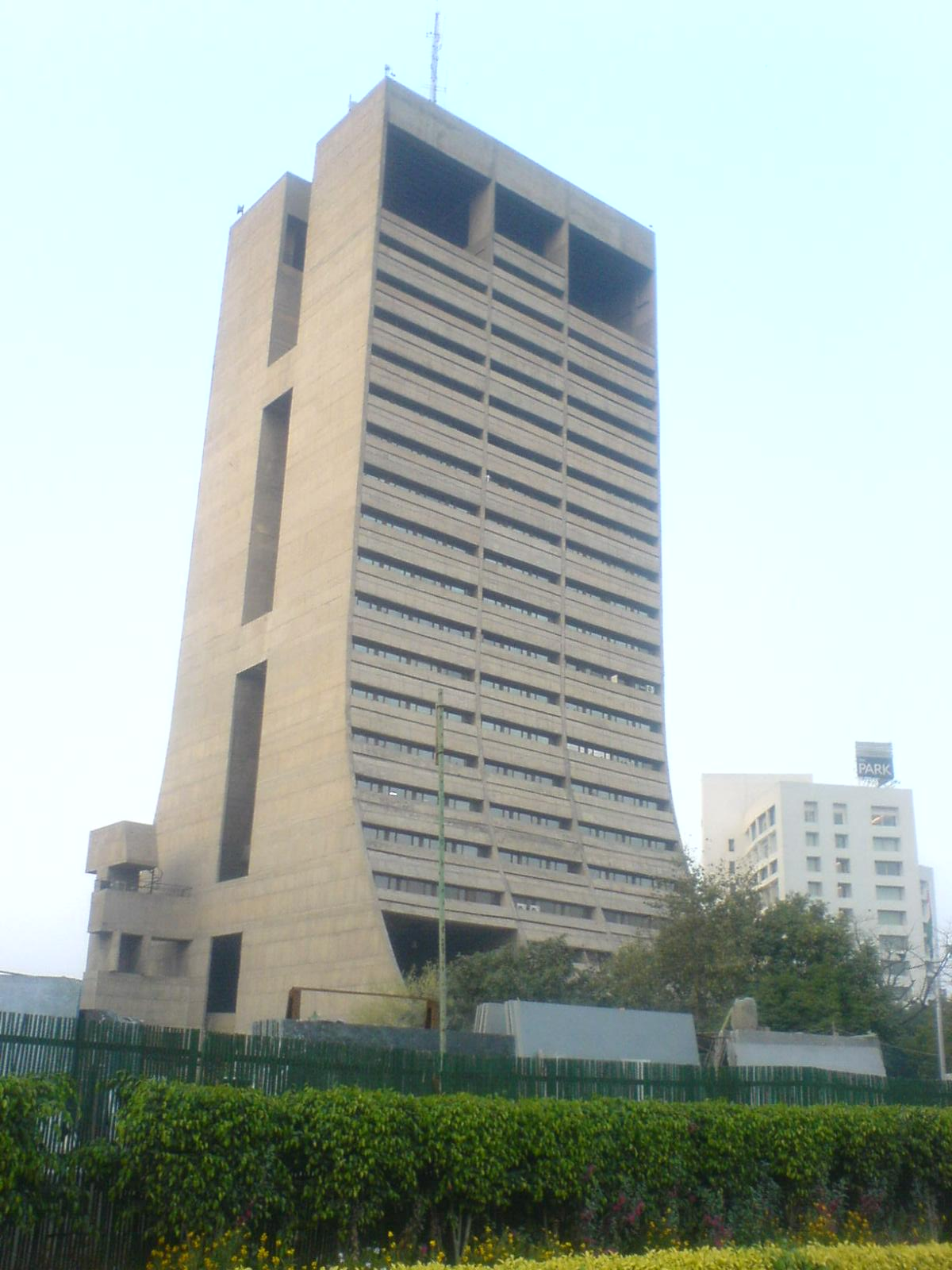
- Palika Kendra, a prominent example of Brutalist architecture
- Interactive map of the Palika Kendra area

General information
- Type: Government Building
- Location: New Delhi, India
- Coordinates: 28°37′42″N 77°12′55″E
- Completed: 1984
- Owner: New Delhi Municipal Council

Technical details
- Floor count: 21

Design and construction
- Architect: Kuldip Singh (architect)
- Structural engineer: Mahendra Raj

Website
- www.ndmc.gov.in

The Palika Kendra is a 21-story building on Sansad Marg, New Delhi, India. Designed by Kuldip Singh and Mahendra Raj, it is among the few structures in Delhi that feature Brutalist architecture. After its inauguration in 1984 with a height of 91 metres (299 ft), it remained one of the tallest buildings in Delhi for years. It serves as the headquarters of the New Delhi Municipal Council and hosts the main server and the command and control centre of the civic body.

The Palika Kendra is among 62 buildings and structures that the Indian National Trust for Art and Cultural Heritage is trying to get designated as modern heritages of the post-independent India. On the 150th birth anniversary of Mahatma Gandhi on 31 January 2019, the Vice President of India, Venkaiah Naidu, inaugurated a grand wall mural of Gandhi made up of terracotta kulhars on a wall of the building.

== Construction ==
The plot where the Palika Kendra stands used to host a tin shed that contained a small makeshift cinema hall for the entertainment of construction workers, who had been employed for developing and building the new capital of the British Raj. In the early 1930s, a building was inaugurated at this site for hosting the town hall of the New Delhi Municipal Committee. The town hall was demolished in the 1970s to make room for the new headquarters of the civic body. The Palika Kendra was designed by two renowned architects of India, Kuldip Singh (architect) and Mahendra Raj.

Inaugurated in 1984, the Palika Kendra remains one of the few structures in India that features the Brutalist architecture style. There are 23 buildings from India that are included in the Atlas of Brutalist Architecture—a "comprehensive volume" documenting this architectural style from across the world. With a height of 91 metres (299 ft), it remained one of the tallest buildings in Delhi for many years after its construction.

== NDMC Headquarters ==
The Palika Kendra is situated at Sansad Marg, New Delhi, and houses the headquarters of the New Delhi Municipal Council (NDMC). It is the tallest building owned by the NDMC. The main server and the command and control centre of the civic body are also located in the building. Public places under the jurisdiction of the NDMC, where video surveillance cameras are installed, are monitored from the command and control centre by computer professionals and Delhi Police personnel.

During the COVID-19 pandemic in India, in May 2020, the headquarters was sealed for two days to be sanitised and disinfected after nine NDMC employees were found to be infected with the coronavirus.

== Modern heritage ==
The Indian National Trust for Art and Cultural Heritage (INTACH) approached the Heritage Conservation Committee (HCC) of the Ministry of Housing and Urban Affairs in 2013 to designate 62 buildings and structures in Delhi—including the Palika Kendra—as "modern heritage", which would bring them under the protection of the Delhi Building Bylaws, 1983. These buildings had been constructed in Delhi after 1947 and are considered contemporary architectural heritages by different organisations, including the INTACH. Though the committee agreed with the proposal, it did not take any action on it for years. This attracted criticism from the High Court of Delhi in 2016, when the court heard a petition filed by the Delhi chapter of the INTACH related to the responsibilities of the HCC and the Delhi Urban Art Commission in providing protection to post-independence modern architectural heritages.

== Mural of Mahatma Gandhi ==
A grand mural depicting Mahatma Gandhi made up of terracotta kulhars on a wall of the building was unveiled by the Vice President of India, Venkaiah Naidu, in the presence of Union Minister Giriraj Singh and the Member of Parliament from New Delhi, Meenakshi Lekhi, during the celebration of the Gandhi Jayanti on 31 January 2019. The 150-square-metre (1,600 sq ft) mural was designed to pay tribute to Gandhi on his 150th birth anniversary. A total of 3,870 kulhars, made by 150 potters from a mixture of soil collected from different parts of the country, were used in constructing this mural.

== See also ==
- List of Brutalist structures
- MCD Civic Centre
