= Tamil Nadu House =

Building in New Delhi, India

Vaigai-Tamil Nadu House
- Interactive map of the Vaigai-Tamil Nadu House area
- Former names: Madras House

General information
- Location: No.6 Kautilya Marg, Chanakyapuri, New Delhi-110021
- Coordinates: 28°35′57.7″N 77°11′56.3″E
- Completed: 1962
- Owner: Government of Tamil Nadu

Other information
- Number of rooms: 49

Podhigai-Tamil Nadu House
- Interactive map of the Podhigai-Tamil Nadu House area

General information
- Location: No.9. Tikendrajit Marg, Chanakyapuri, New Delhi-110021
- Coordinates: 28°34′59.6″N 77°11′26.7″E
- Inaugurated: 16 September 2004
- Owner: Government of Tamil Nadu

Other information
- Number of rooms: 73

Tamil Nadu House (Tamil: தமிழ்நாடு இல்லம்) is the Guest House of the Government of Tamil Nadu in New Delhi. Tamil Nadu House has 2 premises: Vaigai-Tamil Nadu House and Podhigai-Tamil Nadu House. It has Business Centre, Fitness Centre, Auditorium in its premises. Vaigai Tamil Nadu House has 49 rooms and Podhigai Tamil Nadu House has 73 rooms.

The First one Vaigai-Tamil Nadu House was built in the year 1962. It was originally called ‘Madras House’. It is located at No.6 Kautilya Marg, Chanakyapuri. It is located on a plot of land about 1.757 acres. The nearby buildings are Gujrat Bhavan, Arunachal Bhavan.

The Second one Podhigai-Tamil Nadu House is at No.9 Tikendrajit Marg, Chanakyapuri. It was inaugurated on 16 September 2004. It is located on a plot of land about 1.966 acres. The nearby buildings are Uttarakhand Sadan, NEC House, Tripura Bhavan.

The Resident Commissioners represent the Government of Tamil Nadu in New Delhi. And the Resident Commissioners administrates the Tamil Nadu House.
