= High Commission of the United Kingdom, New Delhi =

Diplomatic mission in India

- Address: Shantipath, Chanakyapuri, New Delhi, Delhi, India
- Coordinates: 28°35′51.76″N 77°11′35.16″E
- High Commissioner: Lindy Cameron
- Website: Official website

The High Commission of the United Kingdom in New Delhi is the diplomatic mission of the United Kingdom in India. It is located at Shantipath in Chanakyapuri.

The British High Commission in New Delhi covers consular services for Northern India, namely, Delhi and the states of Jammu and Kashmir, Haryana, Punjab, Uttar Pradesh, Himachal Pradesh, Rajasthan, and Uttarakhand. The High Commission has regional offices, the Deputy High Commissions, at Kolkata, Chennai, and Mumbai. The Deputy High Commission at Bangalore falls under the Chennai division.

== Departments ==
The various departments of the High Commission are as follows:

- British Council Division: The British Council is responsible for activities in education, English language, governance, science and the arts. The council has its offices in New Delhi, Chennai, Kolkata, and Mumbai. The council also manages the British Libraries which are located in Ahmedabad, Bangalore, Chandigarh, Hyderabad, and Pune, in addition to the four major metros.
- British High Commission Offices: The High Commission offices are located at New Delhi, Chennai, Kolkata, and Mumbai. It also has an office at Bangalore covered by the Deputy High Commission at Chennai.
- British Trade Offices: The Trade offices are located at Ahmedabad, Hyderabad, Chandigarh, and Pune.
- British Nationals Services: Urgent assistance, apply or renewal of passport
- Business Information Centres: These are located at Bhopal and Bhubaneshwar.
- Consular Department: This provides consular assistance and protection for British citizens. It also issues passports. The Commission also has a consular office at Goa.
- Defence Department: This department is responsible for all aspects of the defence relationship between the United Kingdom and India.
- Department for International Development (DFID): It is responsible for implementing the United Kingdom's development assistance programme. Its priority is to work with the Government of India towards the elimination of poverty in India. DFID also has its offices in New Delhi, Bhopal, Bhubaneshwar, Hyderabad, and Kolkata.
- FCO Programme Funding Department: The programme fund was established in 2003 to support the United Kingdom's international goals.
- Management Department: This is responsible for all personnel and financial resources and provides support to all frontline departments.
- Political Department: The Political Department is responsible for political relations between the governments of the United Kingdom and India.
- Press and Communications Department: This is responsible for presenting and promoting the British Government policy in India.
- Trade and Investment Section: The Trade and Investment Section is the trade and investment promotion vehicle of the U.K. government which also responsible for trade policy and economic relations.
- Visa Department: This department is responsible for providing visa and entry clearance services for travelling to the United Kingdom. In 2003, the High Commission outsourced its visa services to Visa Facilitation Services, a private service provider with offices at New Delhi, Jalandhar, Chandigarh, Chennai, Bangalore, Hyderabad, Kolkata, Mumbai, Ahmedabad and Pune. All applications are assessed at the British High Commission in New Delhi or the Deputy High Commissions in Mumbai, Chennai and Kolkata.

In 2010, the British High Commission launched its Hindi website.

== See also ==
- List of high commissioners of the United Kingdom to India
- India–United Kingdom relations
- List of diplomatic missions in India
- List of diplomatic missions of the United Kingdom
