= Dale and Patricia Keller =

American interior designers

- Occupation: Interior Designer

Dale & Patricia Keller are American interior designers, recognized for their work in the fields of architecture and interior designe. Dale Allen Keller (1929-2016) was the founder of Dale Keller & Associates Ltd. Pte, previously based in Hong Kong, New York City, and London. They also operated an office in Athens, Greece for a time.

Dale and Patricia Keller were respectively the president and chief designer of Dale Keller & Assiociates, Inc. They built up the world's largest interior design firm specializing in the hospitality industry. Since the mid-1950s they have worked on a range of major projects in China, Japan, Hong Kong, Malaysia, Singapore, Thailand, India, Pakistan, Philippines, Middle East and worldwide.

After they designed the Marunouchi Hotel, Okura Hotel, Tokyo Hilton in Japan, followed by the Hong Kong Hilton, they were acknowledged as experts in high-end modern hotel design. They rode the wave of new hotel construction after World War II, mostly in Asia and later in the Middle East.

They were considered the giants in the field of hotel design for many years. They focused on hospitality interiors, which also included some work on night clubs. Projects that gave them a lot of personal satisfaction were the restoration of the Taj Mahal Hotel, Bombay, and the Manila Hotel, Philippines. Both buildings were on the brink of demolition. The Kellers were able to convince the public that the beautiful buildings could again be viable commercial entities. Most of the Kellers work was in the modernist vein, but what they were known for was bringing a sense of carefully studied cultural identity to their projects. They won the Lifetime Achievement Award in 1999 for their contribution to hospitality design.

They retired to Bellevue, Washington.

== Biography ==
Dale Keller was born on March 13, 1929, in Seattle, United States. Before graduating from University of Washington majoring in Interior Design under Professor Hope Lucille Foote, he decided to study architecture at the University of Tokyo in 1953 under Kenzō Tange where he studied the history of Japanese and Chinese architecture. He had studied the Japanese language for a year in Washington in preparation. He said that becoming fluent in Japanese came to him relatively easily.

Patricia Keller was born on May 18, 1926. She also graduated from University of Washington majoring in Interior Design under Professor Hope Lucille Foote. After graduation, Patricia Keller had her own business. She worked for different several major designers – Arthur Morgan in Seattle, Raymond Loewy in Paris Bernadotte and Bjorn in Copenhagen. She was accepted as a student in Copenhagen's furniture academy. In 1956, she met Dale in Tokyo while on a round-the-world tour. She speaks French.

Dale and Patricia Keller married and the couple had two sons: Mark Keller (born in Tokyo) and Andrew Keller (born in Hong Kong).

1962 - Dale Keller establish his 1st design firm in Hong Kong, Dale Keller & Associates Ltd. He worked alongside Patricia Keller as Chief Designer in the firm, at various times having as many as 30 staff members. The office staff were mostly trained as architects. Their office was a multinational business, with people coming to them from across Asia.

== Works ==
1954 - Dale Keller's first job was collaborating with Bill Shrauger on Pacific House. It was a design and sales organization set up to design and manufacture in the country that exported many characteristic items.

1954 - Dale and Patricia early design works were mostly factories, banks, and offices for an oil company. These included National Cash Register Factory in Japan and Fuji Bank in Japan.

1961 - The first job together for Patricia and Dale Keller was the Marunouchi Hotel - Tokyo, followed soon after by the Okura Hotel and the Tokyo Hilton.

1961 - Listed as number one in interior design magazine list of Giants in Hotel Design

1965 - Appointed for first luxury resort to be built in Asia (Bali Hyatt – Sanur beach Indonesia which won many design awards).

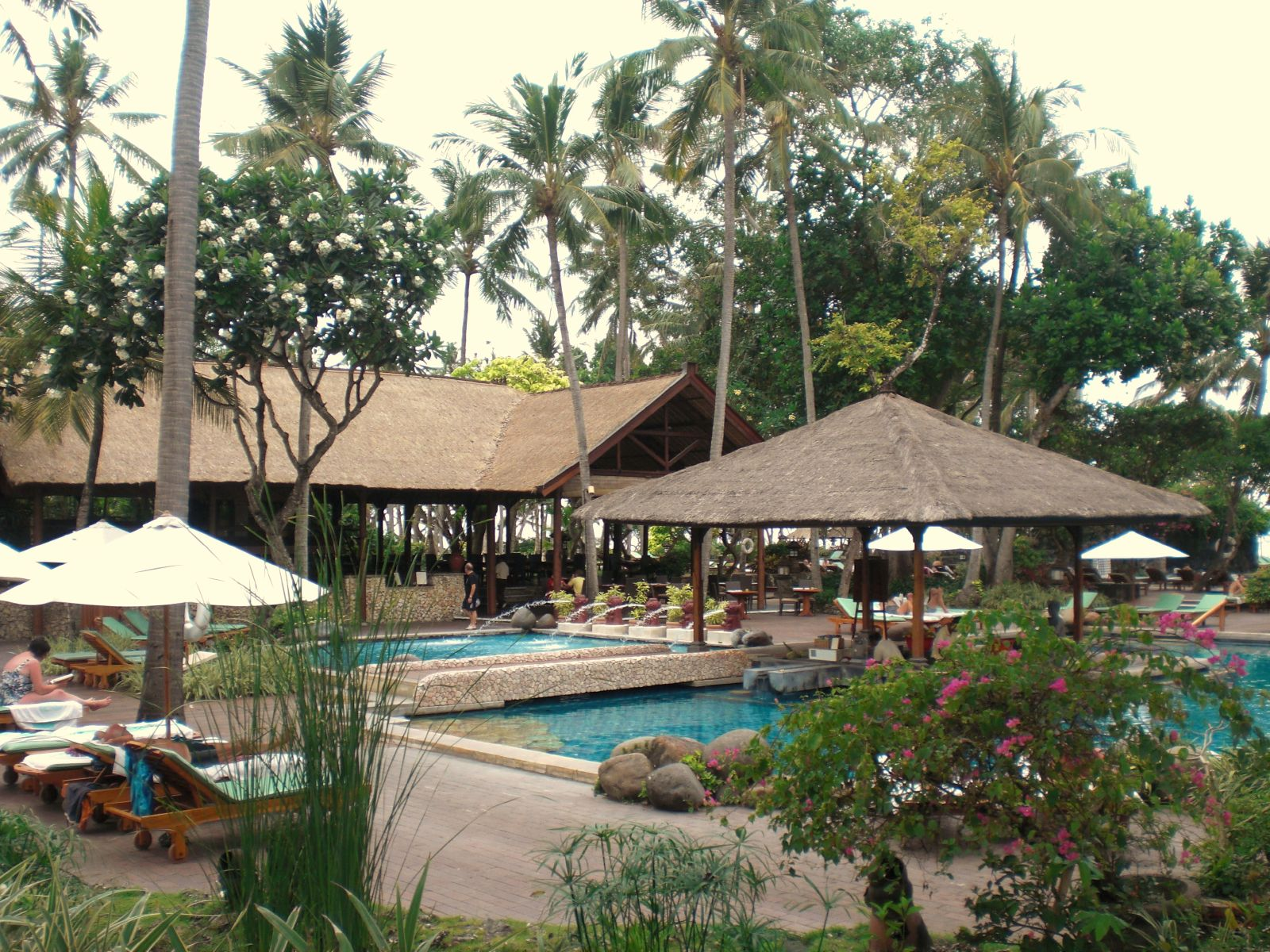
Bali Hyatt

1976 – Opening of restored and expanded Manila Hotel. It won many awards worldwide.

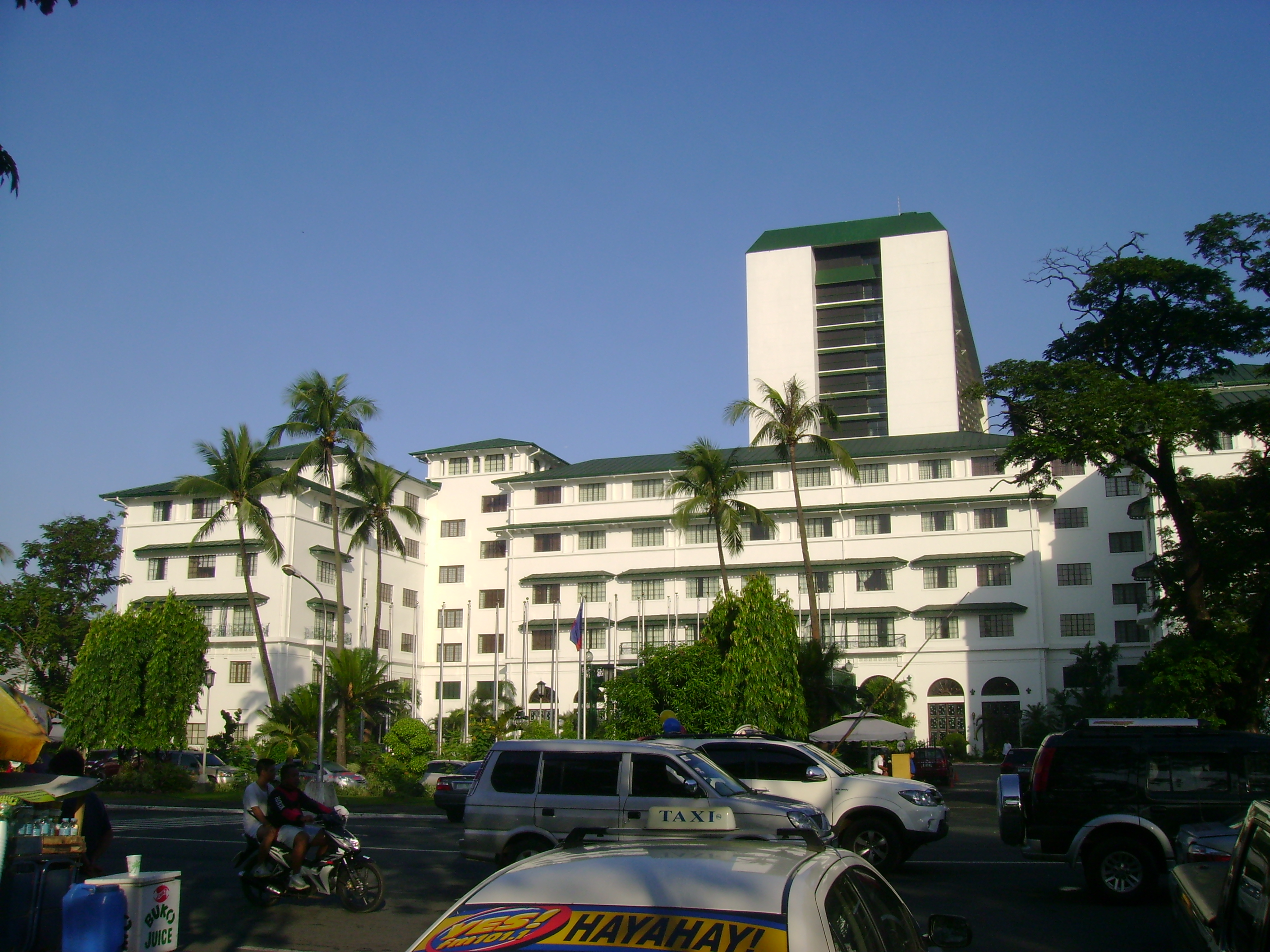
Manila Hotel

The Kellers were invited to design the interior of a new palace in Brunei by the sultan. The palace is listed in the Guinness World Records as the largest palace in the world.

1972 - The Kellers study Chinese rug production in China

1979 - They designed the first modern hotel in China – Fragrant Hill. For the first three years, they worked with I.M.Pei architects to create the Chinese-style hotel built around the remains of a garden built for Kangxi Emperor in the 1700s.

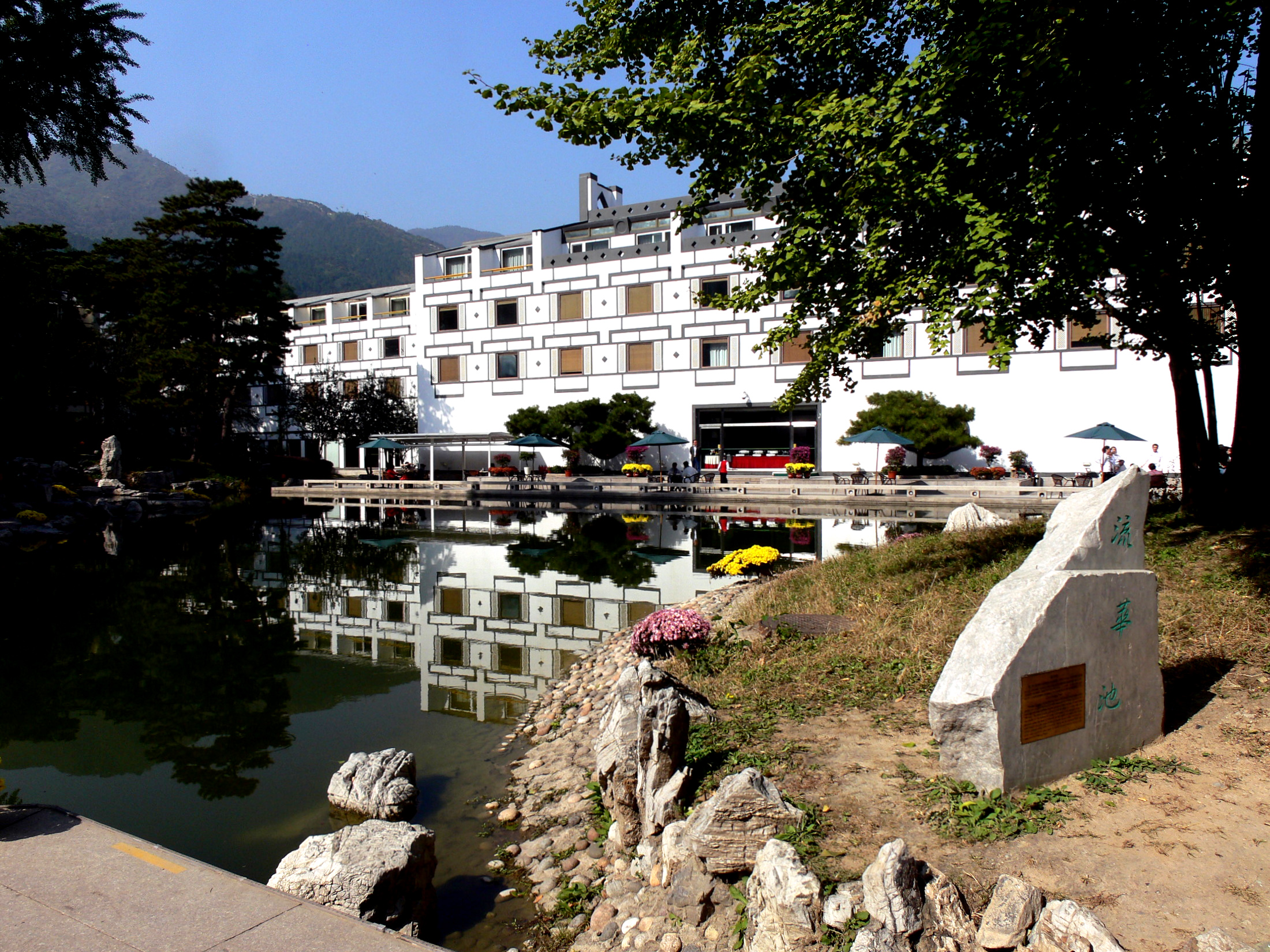
Fragrant Hill

High point of their career – The Aman and the Four season Resort in Bali. They were able to put in their long experience and love for Balinese culture. S Keller's worked as design consultants to help create the prince Maurice resort, Mauritius and the Lemura resort and golf hotel in the Seychellas.

1999 – they won the 1999 lifetime achievement award as hotel designers. The award was presented to them at a gala dinner at the Dorchester Hotel in London on December 6, 1999.

Below are lists of work done by Dale Keller & Assiociates Inc. :

HOTEL INTERIOR DESIGN PROJECTS

| PROJECTS | COMPLETION YEAR | LOCATION |
|---|---|---|
| Sheraton Hotel | 1973 | Australia, Perth |
| Kingsgate Hyatt Hotel | 1973 | Australia, Sydney |
| Bahrain Sheraton Hotel | 1982 | Bahrain, Manama |
| Fragrant Hill Hotel | 1983 | China, Beijing |
| Jinling Hotel | 1983 | China, Nanjing |
| Jinling Hotel (Interior Renovation) | 1996 | China, Nanjing |
| Mandarin Hotel | 1987 | China, Guilin |
| Jin Jiang Tower Hotel | 1988 | China, Shanghai |
| Hyatt Regency | 1990 | China, Xian |
| Swiss Hotel | 1991 | China, Beijing |
| Xinjiang Grand Hotel (Holiday Inn) | 1991 | China, Ürümqi |
| Beijing Hilton Hotel | 1992 | China, Beijing |
| Kempinski Hotel | 1992 | China, Beijing |
| Shangri-La Shenzhen Hotel | 1993 | China, Shenzhen |
| Grosvenor House - Jin Jiang | 1995 | China, Shanghai |
| Cypress Hotel - Jin Jiang | 1997 | China, Shanghai |
| Pacific Hotel - Jin Jiang | 1998 | China, Shanghai |
| Jin Jiang Hotel - Pudong | 2000 | China, Shanghai |
| Radisson Plaza State Guest Hotel | 2000 | China, Beijing |
| Annabelle Hotel | 1985 | Cyprus, Paphos |
| Hyatt El Salam | 1989 | Egypt, Cairo |
| Semiramis InterContinental Hotel | 1992 | Egypt, Cairo |
| Nice Hyatt Hotel | 1979 | France, Nice |
| Porto Caras Resort Complex | 1980 | Greece, Halkadiki |
| Atheaneum InterContinental Hotel | 1982 | Greece, Athens |
| Guam Hilton Hotel | 1972 | Guam |
| Hong Kong Hilton Hotel (demolished 1997) | 1963 | Hong Kong |
| Hong Kong Hyatt Regency Hotel | 1970 | Hong Kong |
| Furama Hotel (demolished 2003) | 1973 | Hong Kong |
| Holiday Inn Hotel, Golden Mile | 1975 | Hong Kong |
| Hong Kong Sheraton Hotel | 1975 | Hong Kong |
| New World Hotel | 1979 | Hong Kong |
| Regent of Hong Kong Hotel | 1981 | Hong Kong |
| Grand Plaza Hotel | 1988 | Hong Kong |
| Prudential Hotel & Graphics | 1990 | Hong Kong |
| Ellipsis (apartment hotel) | 2002 | Hong Kong |
| Akbar Hotel | 1971 | India, New Delhi |
| Taj Mahal Hotel | 1972 | India, Bombay |
| Oberoi Hotel | 1972 | India, Bombay |
| Taj Coromandel Hotel | 1974 | India, Madras |
| Ashok Hotel | 1983 | India, New Delhi |
| Bali Hyatt Hotel | 1973 | Indonesia, Bali |
| Hotel Borobudur InterContinental | 1974 | Indonesia, Jakarta |
| Sari Pacific Hotel | 1977 | Indonesia, Jakarta |
| Hyatt Bumi Hotel | 1980 | Indonesia, Surabaya |
| Aman Resorts | 1993 | Indonesia, Bali |
| Four Season Resort | 1993 | Indonesia, Bali |
| Hotel and Casino Resort | 1977 | Iran, Kish Islan |
| Hyatt Crown Hotel | 1978 | Iran, Tehran |
| Marunoichi Hotel | 1961 | Japan, Tokyo |
| Okura Hotel | 1963 | Japan, Tokyo |
| Tokyo Hilton Hotel | 1963 | Japan, Tokyo |
| Okinawa Hilton Hotel | 1972 | Japan, Okinawa |
| Ibusuki Kanko Hotel | 1972 | Japan, Ibusuki |
| Hayashida Onsen Hotel | 1973 | Japan, Kirishima |
| Kagoshima Kanko Hotel | 1973 | Japan, Kasoshima |
| New Otani Hotel | 1986 | Japan, Osaka |
| Hyatt Regency Hotel | 1983 | Macau |
| Hotel Royal | 1983 | Macau |
| Kuala Lumpur Hilton Hotel | 1972 | Malaysia, Kuala Lumpur |
| Hyatt Hotel | 1980 | Malaysia, Kuantan |
| Hyatt Hotel | 1981 | Malaysia, Kota Kinabalu |
| Subang View Hotel | 1982 | Malaysia, Kuala Lumpur |
| Prince Maurice Resort | 1999 | Mauritius |
| Soaltee Oberoi Hotel | 1979 | Nepal, Kathmandu |
| Lahore Hilton Hotel | 1977 | Pakistan, Lahore |
| Karachi InterContinental Hotel | 1977 | Pakistan, Karachi |
| Lahore InterContinental Hotel | 1980 | Pakistan, Lahore |
| Peshawar InterContinental Hotel | 1980 | Pakistan, Peshawar |
| Rawalpindi InterContinental Hotel | 1980 | Pakistan, Rawalpindi |
| Karachi Hilton Hotel | 1981 | Pakistan, Karachi |
| Manila Hotel | 1976 | Philippines, Manila |
| Manila Hyatt Hotel | 1976 | Philippines, Manila |
| Philippine Plaza Hotel | 1976 | Philippines, Manila |
| Regent Of Manila Hotel | 1977 | Philippines, Manila |
| Shangri-La Mactan Island Resort | 1992 | Philippines, Cebu |
| Manila Peninsula Hotel (renovation) | 1996/2000 | Philippines, Manila |
| Doha Sheraton Hotel | 1982 | Qatar, Doha |
| Dammam Oberai Hotel | 1979 | Qatar, Dammam |
| Jeddah Hyatt Hotel | 1980 | Jeddah, Saudi Arabia |
| Marriott Hotel II | 1980 | Qatar, Riyadh |
| Riyadh Hyatt Hotel | 1981 | Riyadh, Saudi Arabia |
| Red Sea Palace Hotel | 1982 | Qatar, Jeddah |
| Limuria Resort of Praslin | 2000 | Seychelles, Praslin |
| Ming Court Hotel | 1970 | Singapore |
| Singapore Hilton Hotel | 1970 | Singapore |
| Summit Hotel | 1971 | Singapore |
| Oberoi Imperial Hotel | 1971 | Singapore |
| Hotel Malaysia | 1976 | Singapore |
| Singapore Hyatt Hotel | 1977 | Singapore |
| The Pan Pacific Hotel | 1987 | Singapore |
| Chosun Beach Hotel | 1947 | South Korea, Busan |
| Seoul Plaza Hotel | 1986 | South Korea, Seoul |
| Kyong-ju Hilton Hotel | 1992 | South Korea, Kyong-ju |
| Gran Hotel La Florida | 2001/2004 | Spain, Barcelona |
| Lanka Oberoi Hotel | 1974 | Sri Lanka, Colombo |
| Khartoum Hilton | 1974 | Sudan, Khartoum |
| Damascus Sheraton Hotel | 1978 | Syria, Damascus |
| El Cham Hotel | 1982 | Syria, Damascus |
| Ambassador Hotel | 1966 | Taiwan, Taipei |
| Shangri-La Hotel | 1981 | Taiwan, Taipei |
| Bangkok Sheraton Hotel | 1969 | Thailand, Bangkok |
| Rama Hyatt Hotel | 1980 | Thailand, Bangkok |
| President Hotel | 1971 | Thailand, Bangkok |
| Hotel Indra | 1974 | Thailand, Bangkok |
| New York Grand Hyatt Hotel | 1980 | United States, New York |
| St.Regis Hotel | 1981 | United States, New York |

RESIDENTIAL PROJECTS

| PROJECTS | COMPLETION YEAR | LOCATION |
|---|---|---|
| Hirschman Villa | 1982 | Switzerland, Zurich Commissioned Sculptor Robert Erskine |
| Basil Residence | 1980 | Greece, Athens |
| Angelakis Residence | 1983 | Greece, Athens |
| Hydra House | 1980 | Greece, Hydra |
| Harilela Family Residence | 1970 | Hong Kong |
| Apartment 102, Sunning Court | 1985 | Hong Kong |
| Apartment 903, Sunning Court | 1986 | Hong Kong |
| The De Clercq's House, Tai Tam | 1986 | Hong Kong |
| Penthouse - Poshan Road | 1970 | Hong Kong |
| Caspian Sea Villa | 1971 | Iran |
| Pent House | 1971 | Iran |
| Al Sulaiman Residence | 1979 | Jeddah |
| Jubail Camp 10, Residential Development | 1979 | Saudi Arabia |
| Hirschman Jr, Residence | 1982 | Switzerland, Zurich |
| Emmanuel Residence | 1982 | United Kingdom, London |
| Tavoulareas Residence | 1982 | United Kingdom, London |
| Basil Residence | 1980 | United Kingdom, London |
| Al- Sulaiman Residence | 1980 | London |
| Dakota Apartment | 1985 | United States, New York |
| Executive Penthouse, Olympic Tower | 1979 | United States, New York |

Dale Keller ( Design Consultant )

OFFICE & FINANCIAL SECTOR PROJECTS

| PROJECTS | COMPLETION YEAR | LOCATION |
|---|---|---|
| New Istana Offices | 1984 | Brunei, Bandar Seri Begawan |
| Ralli HK Ltd | 1971 | Hong Kong |
| Societe Generale Hong Kong | 1971 | Hong Kong |
| Merban Asia Ltd | 1972 | Hong Kong |
| Credit Lynonnais HK(Finance) Ltd | 1975 | Hong Kong |
| Arthur Young | 1977 | Hong Kong |
| Marshalls HK Ltd | 1977 | Hong Kong |
| Regent International Hotel Office | 1979 | Hong Kong |
| Philippine Commercial International | 1982 | Hong Kong |
| International (HK) Co Ltd | 1983 | Hong Kong |
| Banque Brussels Lambert S.A | 1985 | Hong Kong |
| IBI (Asia) Ltd, Office I | 1985 | Hong Kong |
| IBI (Asia) Ltd, Office II | 1985 | Hong Kong |
| Min Jiang Co. | 1986 | Hong Kong |
| Modern China Development Ltd | 1986 | Hong Kong |
| Far East Bank Headquarters | 1987 | Hong Kong |
| Far East Bank Branch 01 (Alexandra House) | 1987 | Hong Kong |
| Far East Bank Branch 02 (Shun Tak Centre) | 1987 | Hong Kong |
| Far East Bank Branch 03 (Kennedy Town) | 1987 | Hong Kong |
| Far East Bank Technical Centre | 1987 | Hong Kong |
| Far East Bank Branch 04 (Kowloon City) | 1987 | Hong Kong |
| Far East Bank Branch 05 (Mongkok) | 1987 | Hong Kong |
| Far East Bank Branch 10 (Austin Road) | 1988 | Hong Kong |
| Far East Bank Branch 11 (Causeway Bay) | 1988 | Hong Kong |
| Far East Bank Branch 12 (Shum Shui Po) | 1988 | Hong Kong |
| Far East Bank Branch 13 (Central) | 1989 | Hong Kong |
| Far East Bank Finance 16/F | 1988 | Hong Kong |
| FAR East Bank Headquarters Refurbishment | 1988 | Hong Kong |
| IBI Offices III | 1988 | Hong Kong |
| IBI Securities Ltd | 1988 | Hong Kong |
| Standard Chartered Bank 01 (Kennedy Town) | 1988 | Hong Kong |
| Standard Chartered Bank 02 (Tse Wan Shan) | 1988 | Hong Kong |
| Standard Chartered Bank 03 (Aberdeen) | 1988 | Hong Kong |
| Standard Chartered Bank 04 (Yaumatei) | 1988 | Hong Kong |
| Standard Chartered Bank 05 (Container-Port) | 1988 | Hong Kong |
| Standard Chartered Bank 06 (Fung Wong) | 1988 | Hong Kong |
| Eton Tower | 1990 | Hong Kong |
| Fuji Bank | 1963 | Japan, Tokyo |
| American Express International Ltd | 1964 | Japan, Tokyo |
| Chase Manhattan Bank | 1964 | Japan, Tokyo |
| Chase Manhattan Bank | 1965 | Japan, Osaka |
| Manila Electric Company, Office Building | 1975 | Philippines, Manila |
| Philippine Commercial International Bank | 1983 | Philippines, Manila |

OTHER COMPLETED DESIGN PROJECTS

| PROJECTS | COMPLETION YEAR | LOCATION |
|---|---|---|
| New Istana State Palace (200,000 sqm) | 1984 | Brunei, Bandar Seri Begawan |
| National Theatre - Architect Philip Johnson | 1979 | India, Theatre Bombay |
| Casino | 1978 | Iran, Kish Island |
| Air Terminal | 1978 | Iran, Kish Island |
| Philippine International Conference and Convention Centre | 1978 | Philippines, Manila |
| Royal Pavilions (Riyadh Airport) - VIP Suites | 1978 | Saudi Arabia, Riyadh |
| Royal Pavilions (Jeddah Airport) - VIP Suites | 1979 | Saudi Arabia, Jeddah |
| Executive Jet Convair 880 | 1972 | Switzerland, Aircraft Basel |
| Executive Jet 727 | 1974 | Switzerland, Aircraft Basel |
| Executive Jet 707 | 1978 | Switzerland, Aircraft Basel |

== Collaborations ==
Dale Keller & Associates Ltd.Pte was set up as a pure design firm and their staffs are usually architect-trained rather than interior designers. Dale and Patricia Keller would bring along their staff to work with various architects such as:

- I. M. Pei & Associates

- Kerry Hill

- Grounds Kent Architects

- Leandro Locsin

- Ildefonso P. Santos, Jr.

- Skidmore, Owings & Merrill

- Der Scutt

- Palmer & Turner

- Novotny und Mähner

- Gruzen & Partners

== Conclusion ==
Dale and Patricia Keller can justly claim to have pioneered modern hospitality design in Asia and, since the mid-1950s they have worked with different architects on various major projects at China, Japan, Hong Kong, Malaysia, Singapore, Thailand, India, Pakistan and the Philippines, and eventually expanding into the Middle East and worldwide. Instead of utilizing standardized interior furniture, furnishings and finishes in their interiors, they explored and researched each place's culture to create spaces with customized identities with the help of local people, workmen and artisans. Dale Keller was responsible for encouraging PATA to establish a Pacific Asia Heritage Society to actively pursue the protection and preservation of Asian landmarks, culture and living national treasures. This has now become the PATA Foundation which actively sponsors seminars in various Asian countries and gives scholarships to worthy individuals. Although the Kellers had retired and Dale Kellers & Associates had been shut down but they provide consultation to the Mayor of Suzhou, China, and architect I.M.Pei, advising on the restoration of the old city and the development of the new that was mention in the Article " Lifetime Achievement 1999".
