= Kuldip Singh (architect) =

Indian architect (1934–2020)

Kuldip Singh (1934 – 10 November 2020) was an Indian architect and urban planner known for his brutalist architecture designs.

== Biography ==
Singh was born in Shimla in 1934. He attended the Delhi Polytechnic School, Upon graduating with a bachelor's in architecture in 1951, he worked for two years in Chandigarh, where he was mentored by J. K. Choudhury. Following this, he went on to study at the University College London. During his time in England, he also worked with Howard Robertson, on the library building of the Keele University. In 1963, upon his return to India, he started a practice, partnering with Raj Rewal.

He designed the National Cooperative Development Corporation building, and the Palika Kendra for the New Delhi Municipal Council.

On 10 November 2020, he died from Covid-19.

== Personal life ==
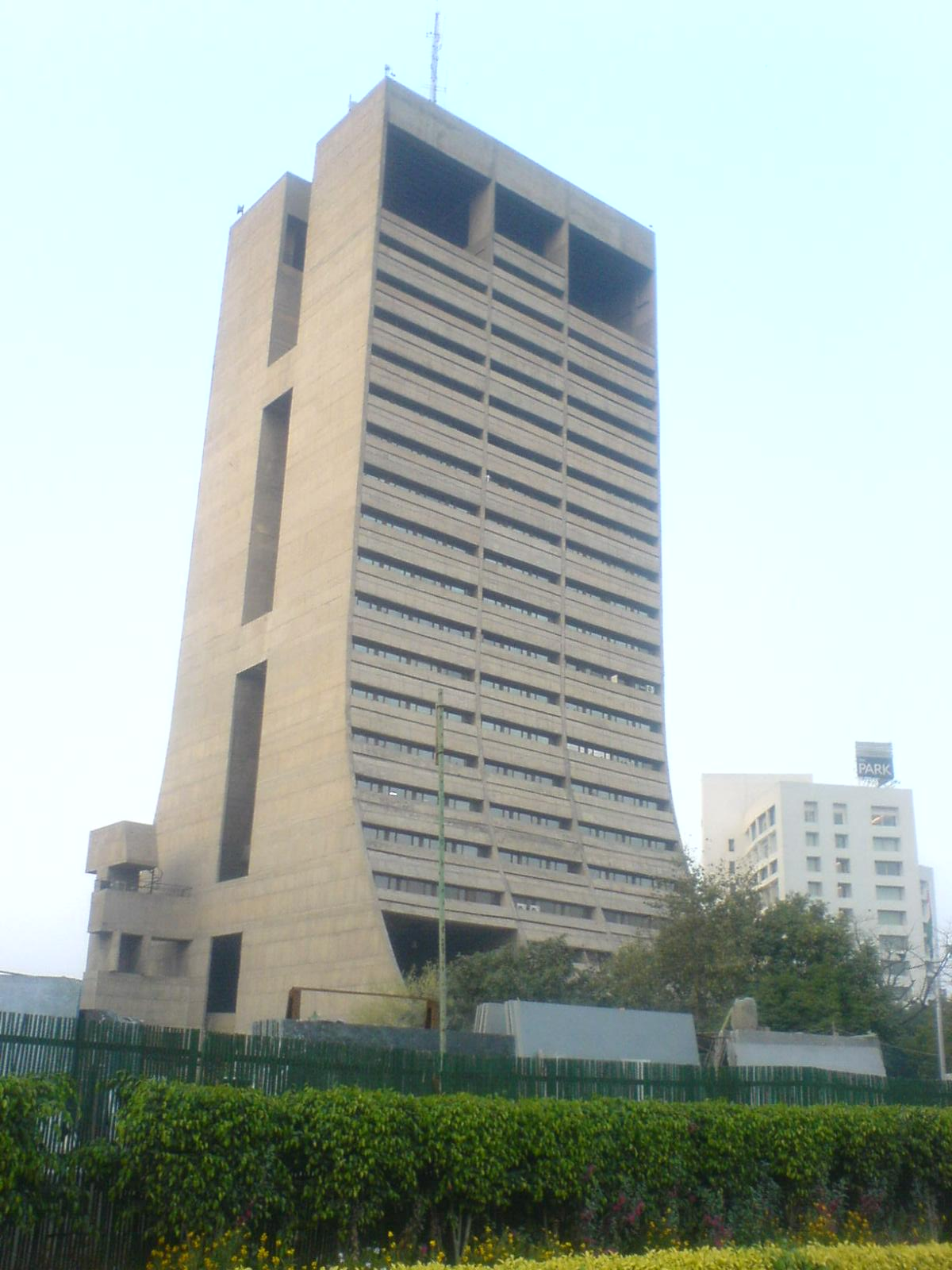
Palika Kendra building in New Delhi, completed in the 1980s

Singh was also an art collector, with his collection of Thanjavur paintings and other southern Indian artworks numbering over 350 objects. This collection is now on display at the Chhatrapati Shivaji Maharaj Vastu Sangrahalaya.

== See also ==
- Jugal Kishore Choudhury
- Shiv Nath Prasad
- Mahendra Raj
