= Akbar Bhawan =

Building in New Delhi, India

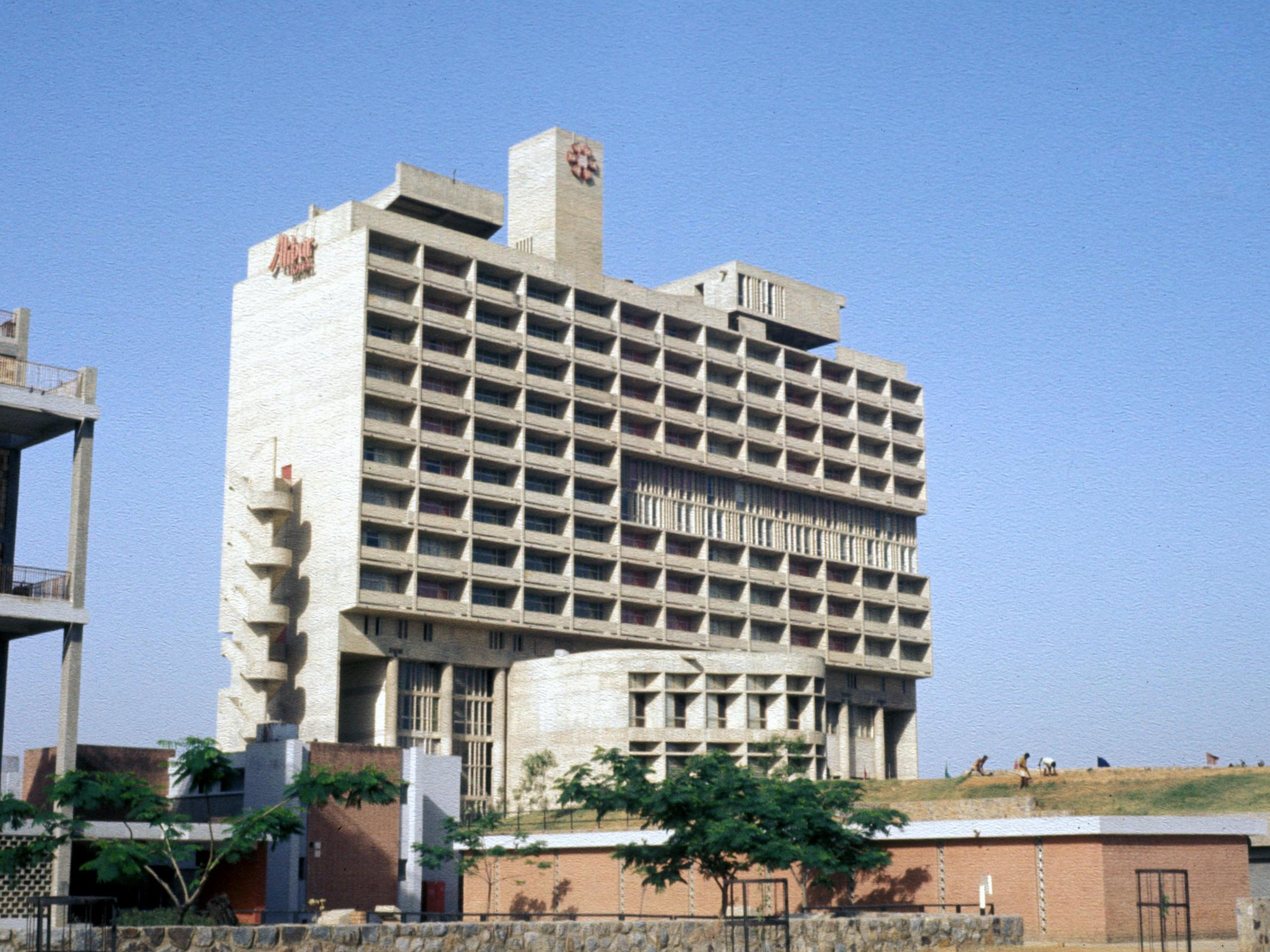
- Akbar Bhawan when it was the Akbar Hotel
- Hotel chain: India Tourism Development Corporation until 1986

General information
- Location: New Delhi, India, Satya Marg, Chanakyapuri, New Delhi 110 021
- Coordinates: 28°35′07″N 77°11′25″E
- Opening: 27 January 1972
- Owner: New Delhi Municipal Council
- Operator: South Asian University, Ministry of External Affairs

Technical details
- Floor count: 13

Design and construction
- Architect: Shiv Nath Prasad

Other information
- Number of rooms: 318

Akbar Bhawan, formerly the Akbar Hotel, is a building in the Chanakyapuri locality of New Delhi, India which houses the South Asian University and offices of the Government of India's Ministry of External Affairs. Designed by Shiv Nath Prasad in collaboration with Mahendra Raj, it is one of Delhi's best known examples of brutalist architecture and bears semblance to the Unité d'habitation in Marseille, France. Inaugurated in 1972, it was a hotel of the India Tourism Development Corporation before its conversion into an office complex in 1986. Named after emperor Akbar The Hotel was noted for its use of innovative decor that blended contemporary designs with traditional Indian art and handicrafts.

== Location ==
The building is located on Satya Marg in the diplomatic enclave of Chanakyapuri, New Delhi.

== Design ==
Akbar Bhawan was designed by architect Shiv Nath Prasad and built by Mahendra Raj. It mirrors the architectural style of Le Corbusier and is one of India's best known examples of brutalist architecture. Built with prestressed concrete, the building has few decorative motifs keeping in line with the brutalist aesthetic. It has a raw concrete finish, uses brise soleils and features an exposed staircase at its far end. The use of a transfer girder in the transitional floors of the building allowed for the creation of a column free lobby, a feature that came to be adopted widely in hotel design. The use of pure geometric forms in the building has been attributed to the influence of rationalist architecture whereas the exposed nature of the building material is thought to have been due to financial austerity rather than the brutalist aesthetics. Comprising 13 storeys, a service floor separates the common rooms from the accommodation and amenities such as its restaurant, a garden and a theatre were on the roof and the building's floor plan closely resembles the Unité d'habitation in Marseille. The interior design for the building was done by Laila Tyabji and Dale Keller. The Akbar's interior design and decor were noted for their blend of western and Indian elements. The hotel's logo was taken from the design in a lattice screen at Sikandra, Agra. The windows in the lobby were decorated with wooden beads from Channapatna, Karnataka and its walls featured swords and scimitars from Rajasthan. The interior decoration also featured kalamkari prints in its conference room, Birbal, and used Rajput, Mughal and Kangra miniature paintings and Tibetan thangkas in the suites. The trends set in interior decor at the Akbar became widespread in India's hotel and hospitality industry in later years. Its coffee shop, Madhuban, was noted for the Mithila murals decorating its walls which was a pioneering attempt to commercialize and give the artform a modern identity. The structure has however been criticized as being squalid and visually unappealing whereas the use of concrete and glass causes high indoor temperatures during power outages.

== History ==
The Akbar Hotel was built as part of the Fourth Five Year Plan. The building is owned by the New Delhi Municipal Council. Construction of the building began in 1966 and was completed by 1969–70. It was inaugurated by Dr. Karan Singh, the then Union Minister of Tourism and Civil Aviation on 27 January 1972. Leased and operated by the India Tourism Development Corporation, the hotel remained profitable throughout the 1970s. However, by the early 1980s it began to incur losses and ITDC suffered low occupancy in its hotels following the construction boom in the run up to the 1982 Asian Games. In the changed business environment and the government's decision to exit the business of running luxury hotels, the ITDC decided to hand over the building to the Ministry of External Affairs to house its offices.

== Akbar Bhawan ==
The hotel was shut down in April 1986, and the building was turned into a government office building and renamed Akbar Bhawan. The Foreign Service Institute under the Ministry of External Affairs used to function from the building. The Government of India planned to redevelop the building into a five-star hotel with private partnership in the run up to the 2010 Commonwealth Games, but it was never implemented. The South Asian University has been housed in the building since 2010 pending relocation to its permanent campus at Maidan Garhi, Delhi. The Ministry of Overseas Indian Affairs was located in the building before its merger with the Ministry of External Affairs.
