= J. K. Choudhury =

Indian architect and urban planner

Jugal Kishore Choudhury
- Born: 1918; Goalpara, Assam, British India
- Died: 1998 (aged 79–80)
- Occupation: Architect
- Known for: Concrete architectural designs
- Awards: Padma Shri; IIA Baburao Mhatre Gold Medal

Jugal Kishore Choudhury (1918 in Goalpara, Assam - 1998) was an Indian architect and urban planner known for his concrete architectural designs.

== Biography ==
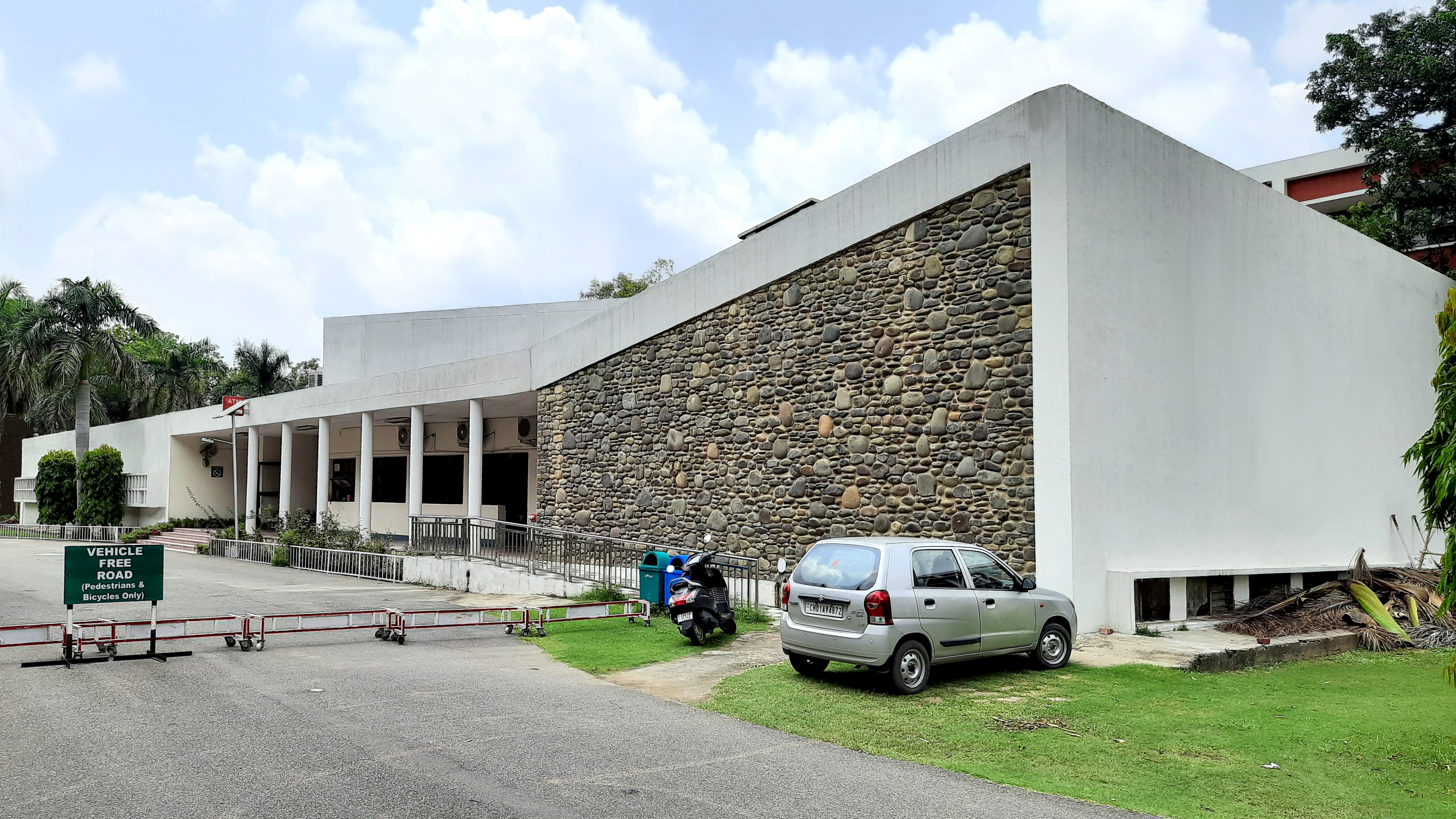
Punjab Engineering College (PEC) academic wing, at Chandigarh, 1953

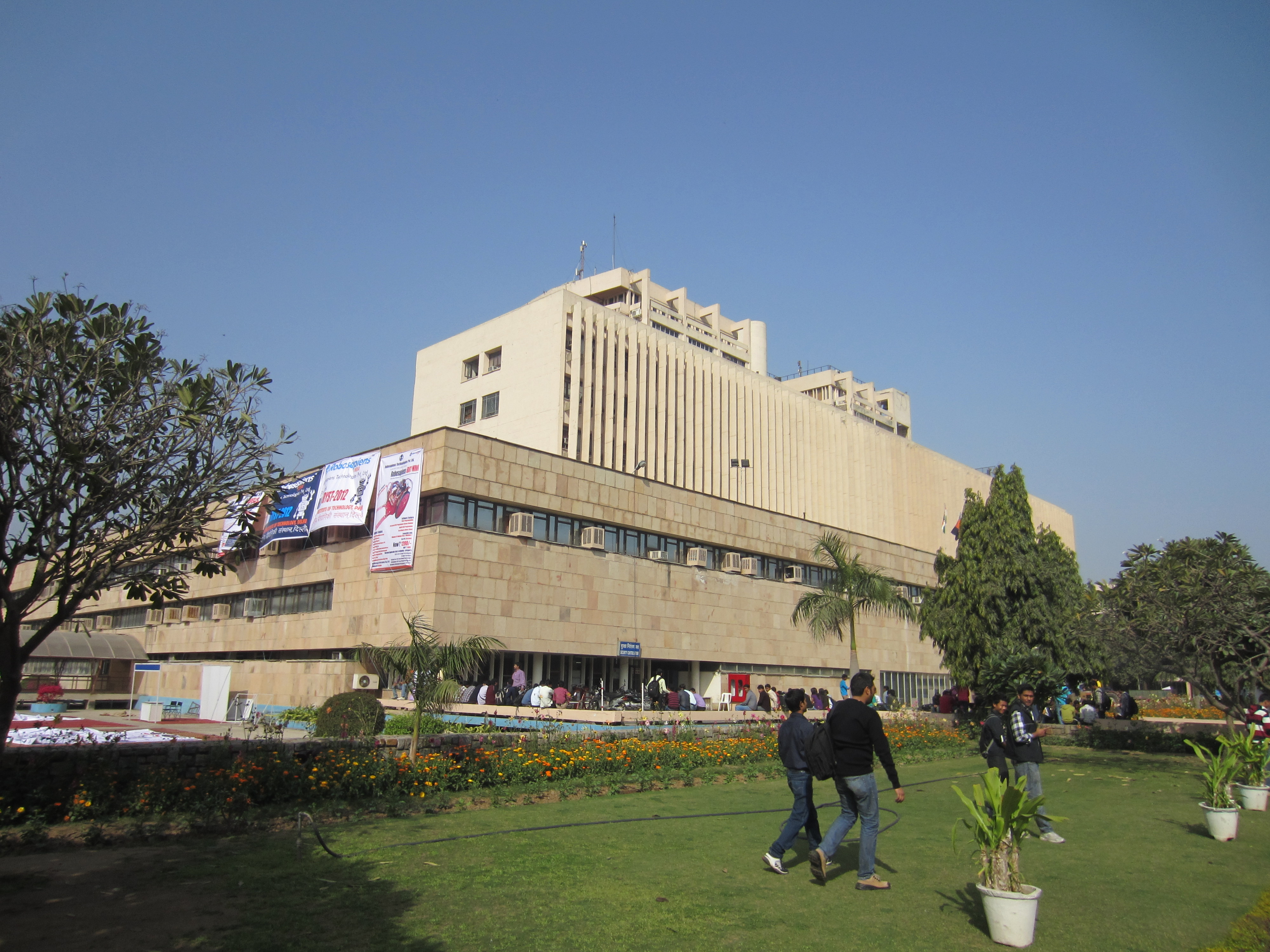
IIT Delhi main building, constructed in 1968

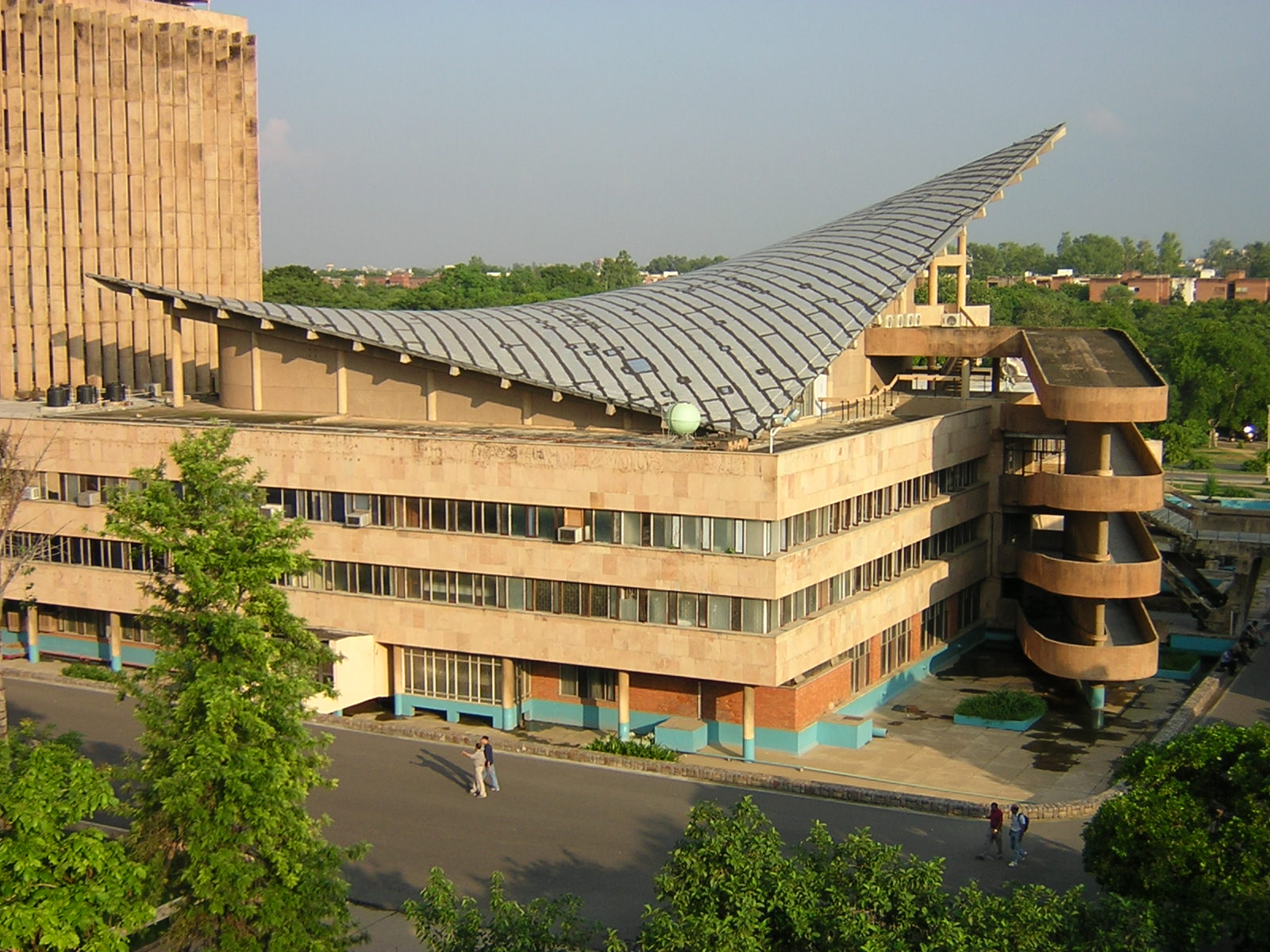
Department of Mathematics auditorium, constructed next to the IIT Delhi main building at the same time

He studied at the Sir J. J. School of Art in Bombay. He then continued his studies in England at London University. After that he moved to the United States and worked in New York for renowned architect Antonin Raymond.

He was associated with renowned architects like Le Corbusier and Pierre Jeanneret during they worked in Chandigarh.

He designed the Punjab Engineering College main campus buildings in the 1950s and the IIT Delhi main building and Department of Mathematics auditorium in the 1960s.

== Awards and honours ==
The Government of India awarded the fourth highest Indian civilian honour of Padma Shri in 1977. He is a recipient of the Baburao Mhatre Gold Medal from the Indian Institute of Architects, which he received in 1994. Dalmia Cements, a part of Dalmia Group, has established a forum, Padmashree Jugal Kishore Chowdhury Forum of Excellence, in association with the Jugal Kishore Chowdhury Charitable and Educational Trust and Association of Architects Assam (AAA). The forum has instituted an annual award in Choudhury's name, JKC Award of Excellence for recognizing excellence in architecture.

== See also ==
- Mahendra Raj
- Kuldip Singh (architect)
- Shiv Nath Prasad
