= The British School, New Delhi =

The British School

Location
- Dr. Jose P Rizal Marg, Chanakyapuri, New Delhi, 110021, India; Chanakyapuri, New Delhi, India; 28.5974°N 77.1805°E

Information
- Type: Private, International
- Motto: Thrive Believe Succeed
- Established: July 1963
- Oversight: EYFS, National Curriculum of England, IGCSE and IB
- Director: Vanita Uppal OBE
- Principal: Mark Defield Taitt
- Enrolment: 1,500
- Mascot: Panther
- Website: british-school.org

The British School, New Delhi is an independent, multicultural, English Medium, co-educational international school. This not-for-profit school offers the National Curriculum of England adapted to an international context, the EYFS programme, the IGCSE and the IB Diploma Programme. With over 1,200 students from 66 nationalities, the school provides student-centred education in a safe, stimulating and multicultural environment.

The British School was awarded the Top British International School Award by BISA (British International School Awards) in London in January 2018. They also won the Outstanding Initiative to Support Student Safeguarding award at the same event. In addition, the school was recognised in Fortune India's Future 50 Schools Shaping Success.

== History ==
The British School was started in July 1963 by a group of British parents with 30 students representing 5 nationalities in Defence Colony, New Delhi. They were supported by the British High Commissioner and in 1969 moved the school to a new location. While the school started with the aim of serving the diplomatic and expatriate community, its remit has broadened considerably over the years resulting in a definitive mix of British and international education in an Indian context. The school operates under the aegis of ‘The British School Society’ with the British High Commissioner to India as its president.

== Curriculum ==
The British School is divided into Primary and Secondary sections, and further into Key Stages as follows:

Key Stage	Year groups	Curriculum
EYFS	Nursery and Reception	Early Years Foundation Stage
KS 1	Years 1 and 2	National Curriculum of England
KS 2	Years 3, 4, 5 and 6	National Curriculum of England
Middle Years	Year 7, 8 and 9	National Curriculum of England
KS 4	Years 10 and 11	International General Certificate of Secondary Education
KS 5	Years 12 and 13	International Baccalaureate Diploma

== Accreditation ==
The school is an accredited member of the Council of International Schools (CIS) and of the International Baccalaureate Organisation (IBO), and is affiliated to London's Edexcel Examination Board and the Cambridge International Examinations Board.

The school is also a member of the Council of British International Schools (COBIS), the Round Square Conference of Schools, Federation of British International Schools in Asia (FOBISIA), The Association of International Schools in India (TAISI), The Specialist Schools and Academies Trust (SSAT), The Heads' Conference (HMC), College Board, Universities and Colleges Admissions Service (UCAS), Common Sense Digital Citizenship, Academy for Internal School Head (AISH), East Asia Regional Council of School (EARCOS), and The Education Collaborative for International School (ECIS).

== Notable alumni ==
- Anahat Singh
- Soha Ali Khan
