= Shiv Nath Prasad =

Indian architect (born 1922)

Shiv Nath Prasad (1922–c. 2002) was an Indian architect and urban planner known for his Brutalist architecture designs. He was also called the "Le Corbusier of India".

== Biography ==
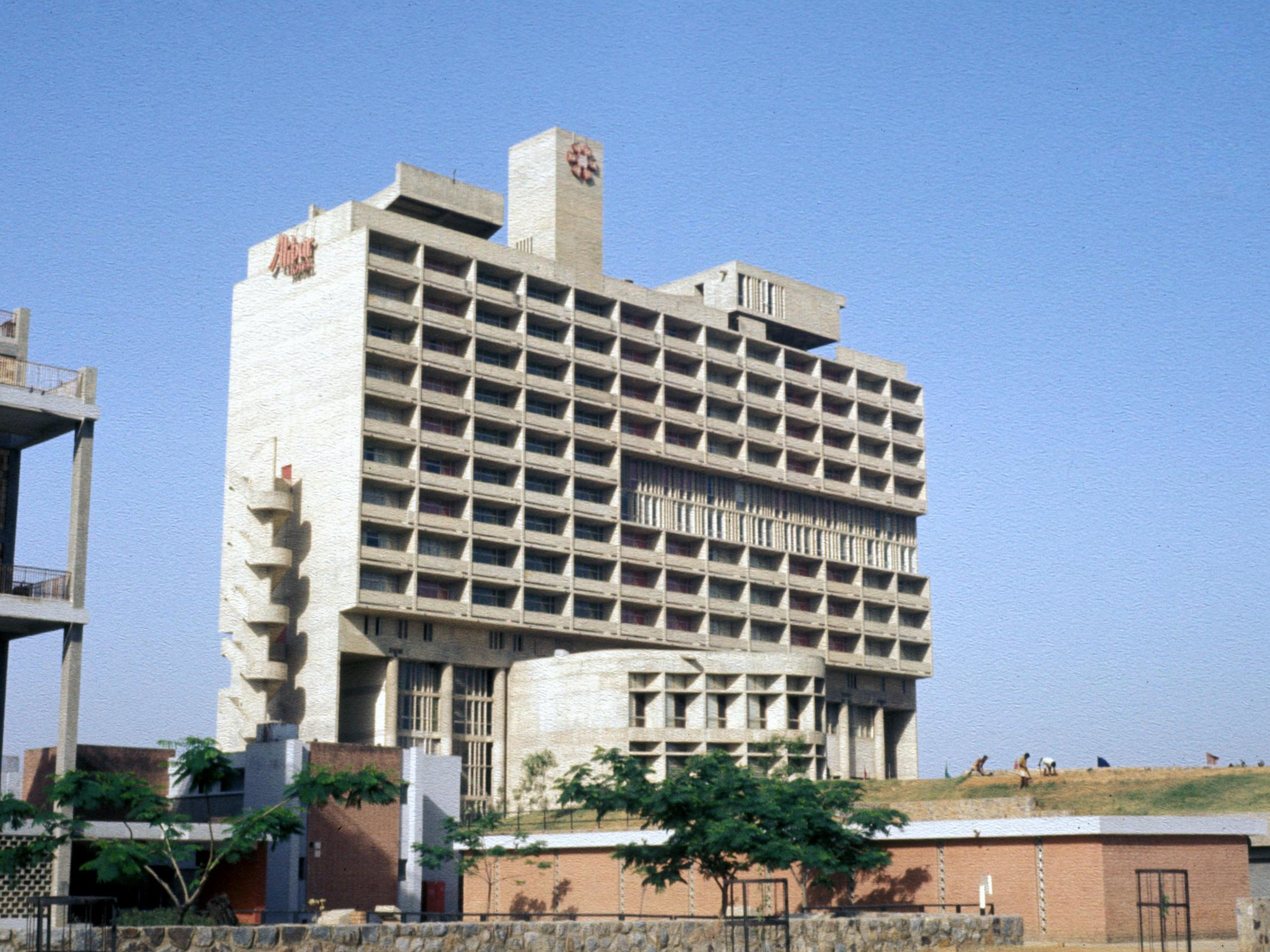
Akbar Hotel in Chanakyapuri, New Delhi constructed 1965–1969

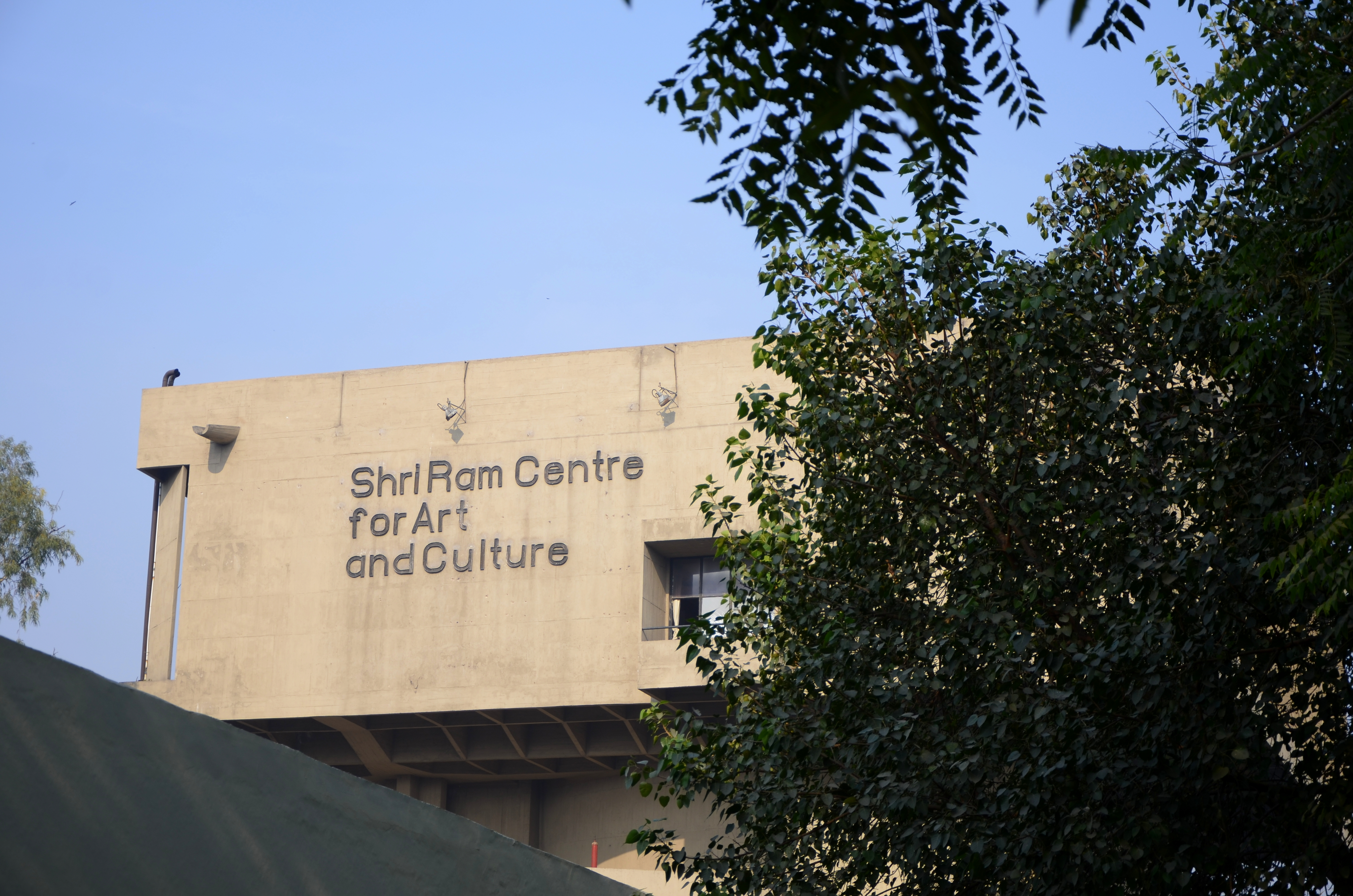
Shri Ram Centre for Performing Arts, Delhi (1966-69)

Shiv Nath was born in Varanasi, British India in 1922.

His work is influenced by Le Corbusier, even though it is not completely clear if the two have ever worked together or not.

His works include the Akbar Hotel in Chanakyapuri, New Delhi, which was constructed between 1965 and 1969 with Mahendra Raj for the India Tourism Development Corporation. It has elements of Le Corbusier's Unité d'habitation. The Shri Ram Centre for Performing Arts (with Mahendra Raj) was constructed from 1966–69 and Tibet House in 1970.

He was professor of architecture at the School of Architecture, University of Illinois, at Champaign-Urbana in the 1980' and moved back to Delhi after retirement.

Prasad died in the early 2000s.

== See also ==
- Jugal Kishore Choudhury
- Kuldip Singh (architect)
