= Mahendra Raj =

Indian structural engineer and designer (1924–2022)

- Born: 1924; Gujranwala, Punjab, British India
- Died: 8 May 2022 (aged 97); Delhi, India
- Occupations: Structural engineer and designer
- Notable work: Hall of Nations Pragati Maidan, Salar Jung Museum, Indian Institute of Management, Bangalore

Mahendra Raj (1924 – 8 May 2022) was an Indian structural engineer and designer who contributed to structural design of many buildings in India including the Hall of Nations at the Pragati Maidan in Delhi and the Salar Jung Museum in Hyderabad. Raj's work is considered pioneering for its engineering solutions for exposed concrete buildings and much of his work is seen as telling the history of post-independence India. In a career spanning six decades, he collaborated with architects including Le Corbusier, B. V. Doshi, Charles Correa, and Raj Rewal, and contributed to the structural design for more than 250 projects.

== Early life ==
Raj was born in Gujranwala in the Punjab state of the then undivided British India in 1924. He was born in a lower middle class family and was one of eight children. His father was an engineer with the Punjab Public Works Department. Later, Raj would say that his intent was never to become a civil engineer but his father wanted all of his five sons to become civil engineers.

Raj completed his degree in civil engineering with honours from Punjab Engineering College in Lahore in 1946.

== Career ==
After obtaining his degree, Raj joined the Punjab Public Works Department in their Buildings and Roads department. He moved to the Indian side after the partition of India in 1947 on one of the last trains to reach India safely. He moved to Shimla and was assigned to the rehabilitation cell at the PWD which was tasked to build housing for displaced middle-class families. It was here that he was made an assistant design engineer and collaborated with Swiss-French architect Le Corbusier, who was then tasked with the design of Chandigarh, the new capital of Punjab. Raj collaborated with Corbusier on buildings including the Chandigarh High Court and the secretariat. He was noted to have proposed changes to the structure which resulted in a balanced cantilever resting on two columns. After his initial collaborations with Corbusier, Raj went to the United States for a masters in structural design from the University of Minnesota. After his masters he moved to New York and worked at Ammann & Whitney until 1959. He returned to India in 1960 and started Mahendra Raj Consultants in Bombay in 1960. He later collaborated with Indian architect and urban planner, Charles Correa, to build the Hindustan Lever pavilion at Pragati Maidan in New Delhi in 1961. The structure was designed to resemble a crumpled sheet of paper with a maze of ramps and platforms. The structure followed the idea of progression through a maze with space being enclosed by reinforced concrete cement sprayed under pressure to create random folds resembling a crumpled card. The work was noted to have foreshadowed deconstructivist architecture works by at least two decades.

Raj worked with Pritzker prize winning architect B. V. Doshi in designing the Indian Institute of Management Bangalore and the Tagore Hall in Ahmedabad. Many years later, in 1971, he collaborated with Indian architect Raj Rewal to design the Hall of Nations at the Pragati Maidan. The structure was one of the largest space frame structures in the world and was described by The New York Times as a "brutalist masterpiece". He also worked with architect Shiv Nath Prasad on Akbar Hotel in Chanakyapuri, New Delhi, as well as the Shri Ram Centre for Performing Arts in 1972 with Shiv Nath Prasad.

Raj's work is considered pioneering for its engineering solutions for exposed concrete buildings and much of his work is seen as telling the history of post-independence India. In a career spanning six decades, he contributed to the structural design for more than 250 projects. Raj also worked with the Government of India, in drafting legislations regulating the profession of engineers resulting in the creation of the Engineering Council of India in 2002.

== Personal life ==
Raj was married and had three children. His youngest son, Rohit Raj Mehendiratta is also an architect. Rohit Raj Mehendiratta and his wife Vandini Mehta wrote a book on Raj's works titled The Structure: Works of Mahendra Raj.

Raj died on 8 May 2022 at his home in Delhi. He was aged 97.

== Gallery ==
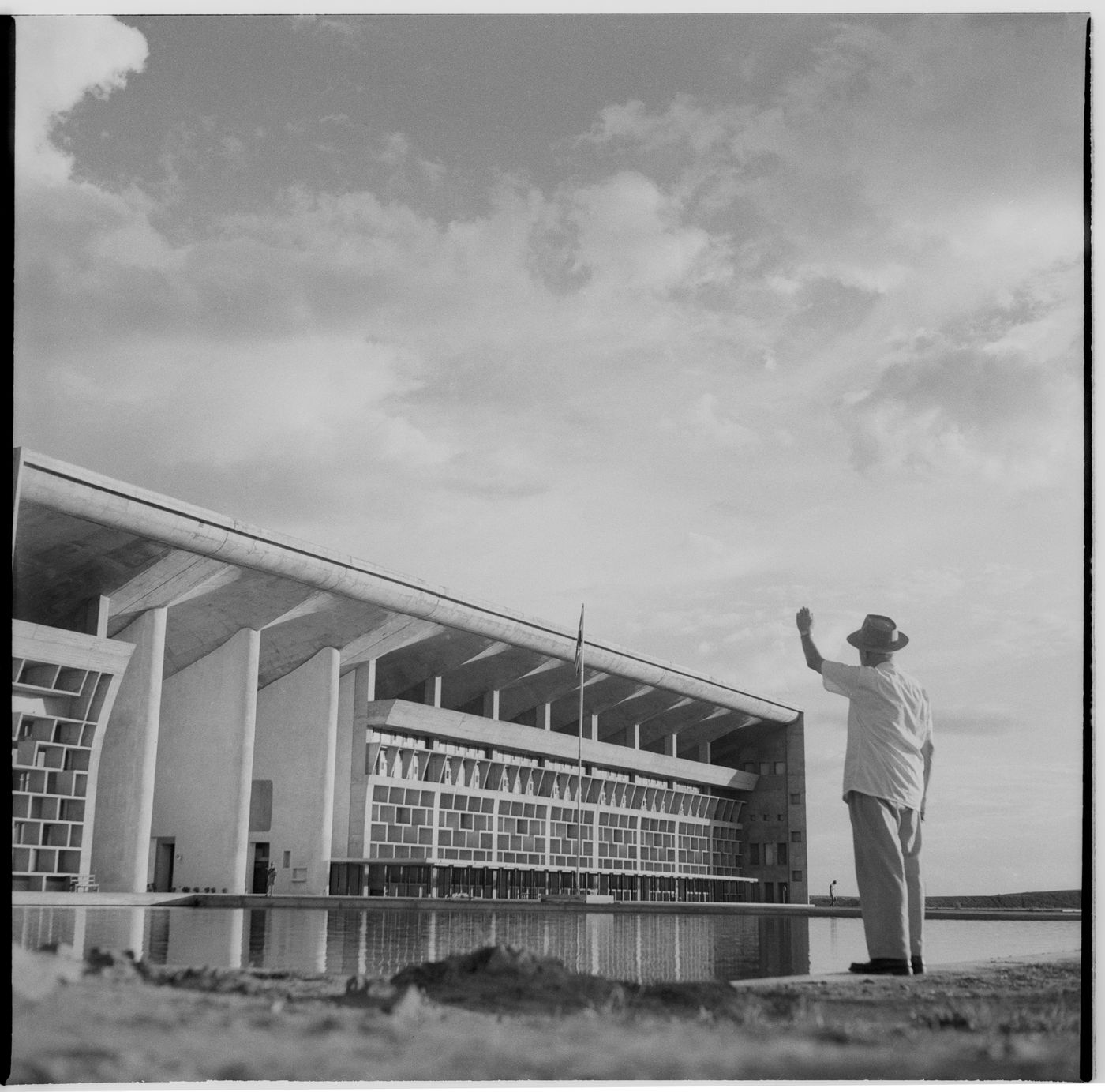
Chandigarh High Court, Chandigarh

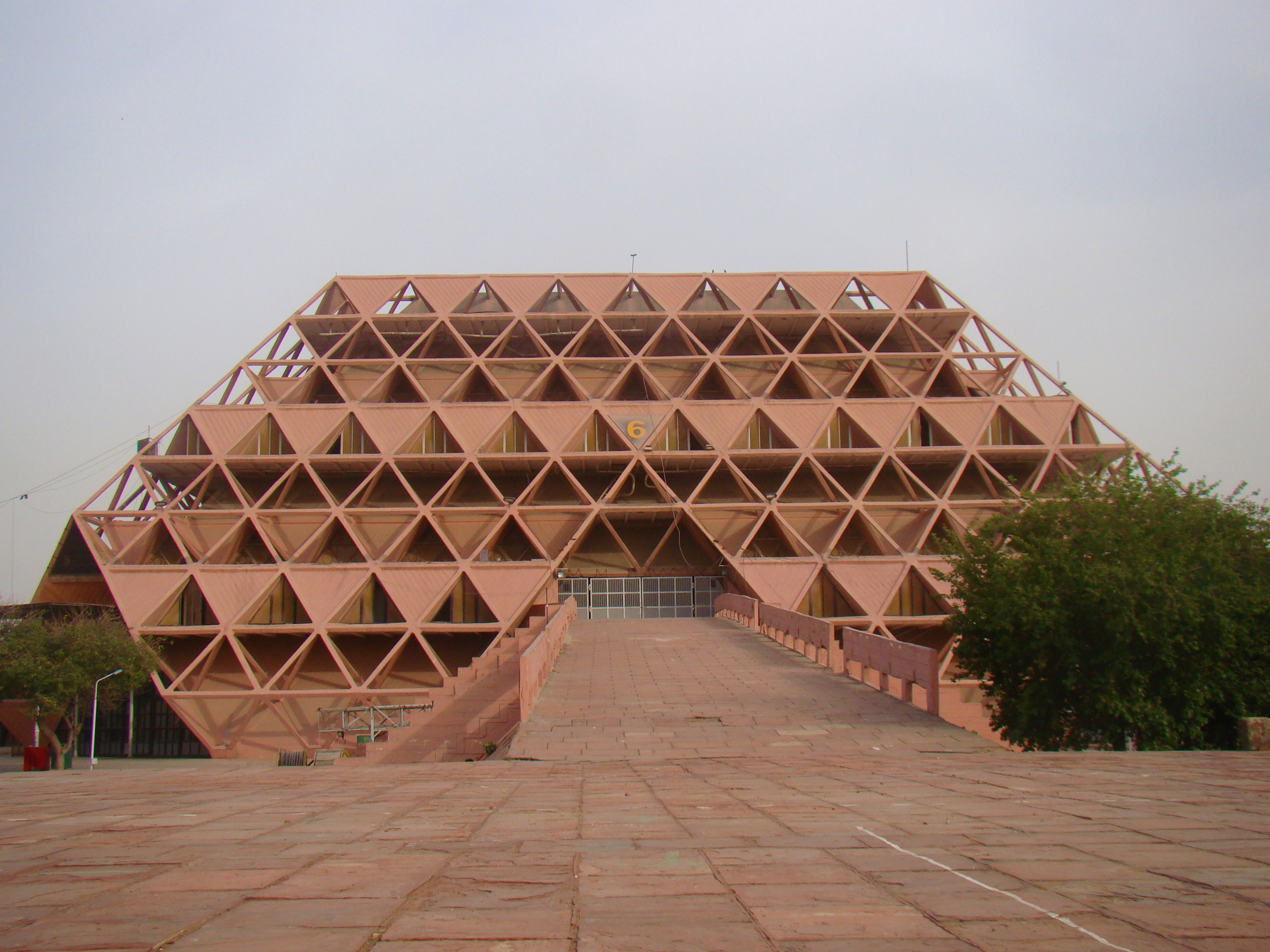
Hall of Nations, Pragati Maidan, Delhi

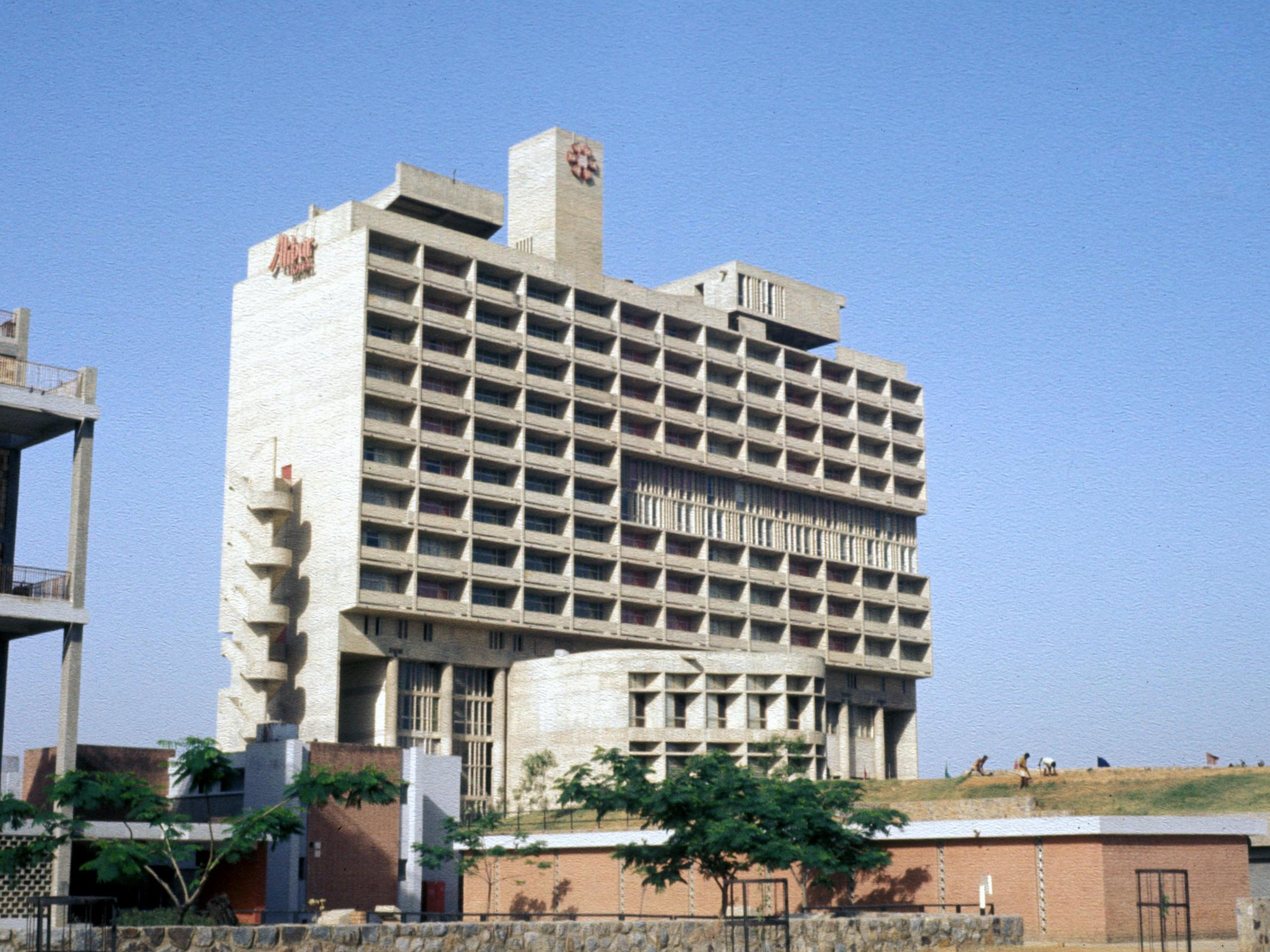
Akbar Hotel in Chanakyapuri, New Delhi constructed 1965-1969

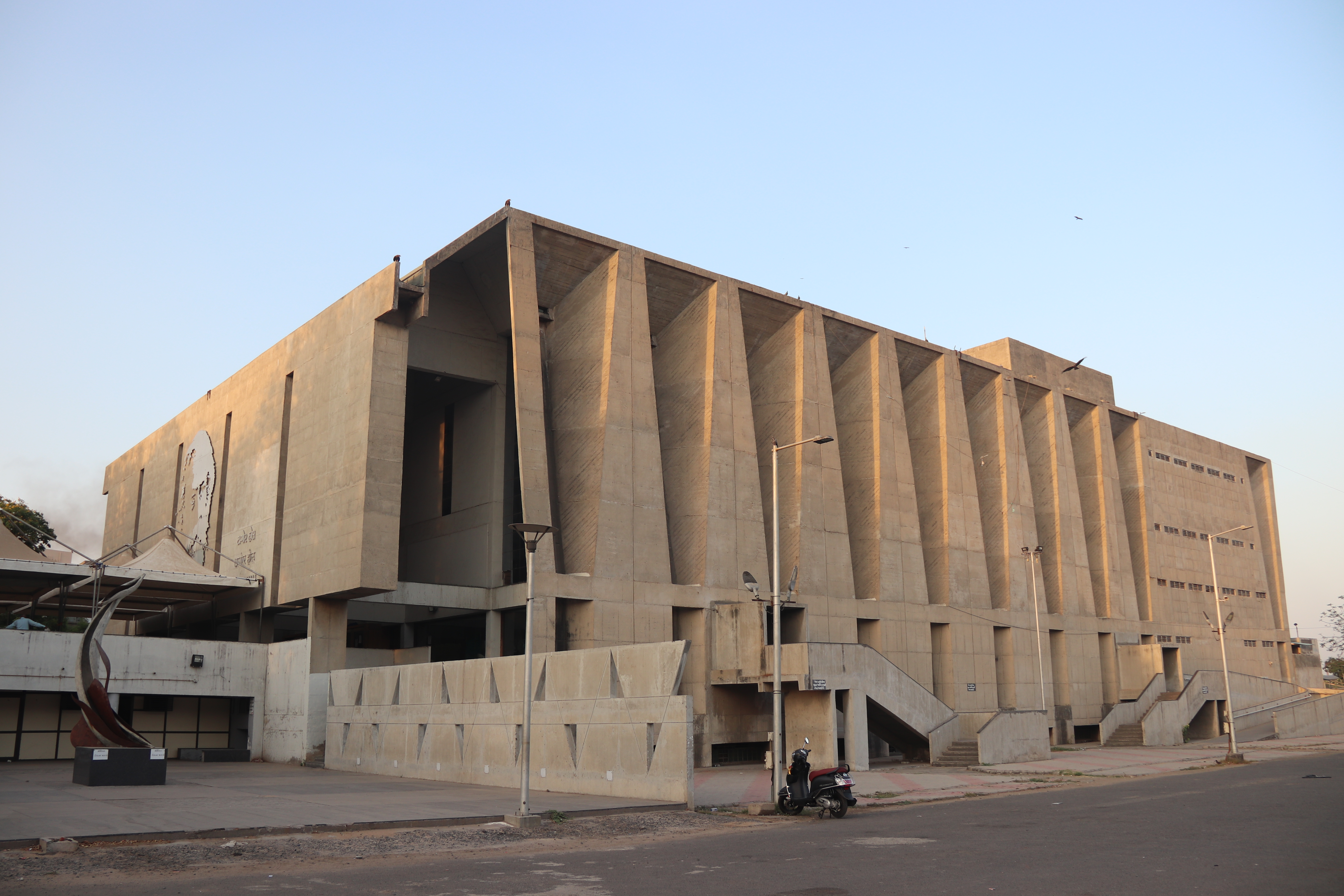
Tagore Memorial Hall, Ahmedabad

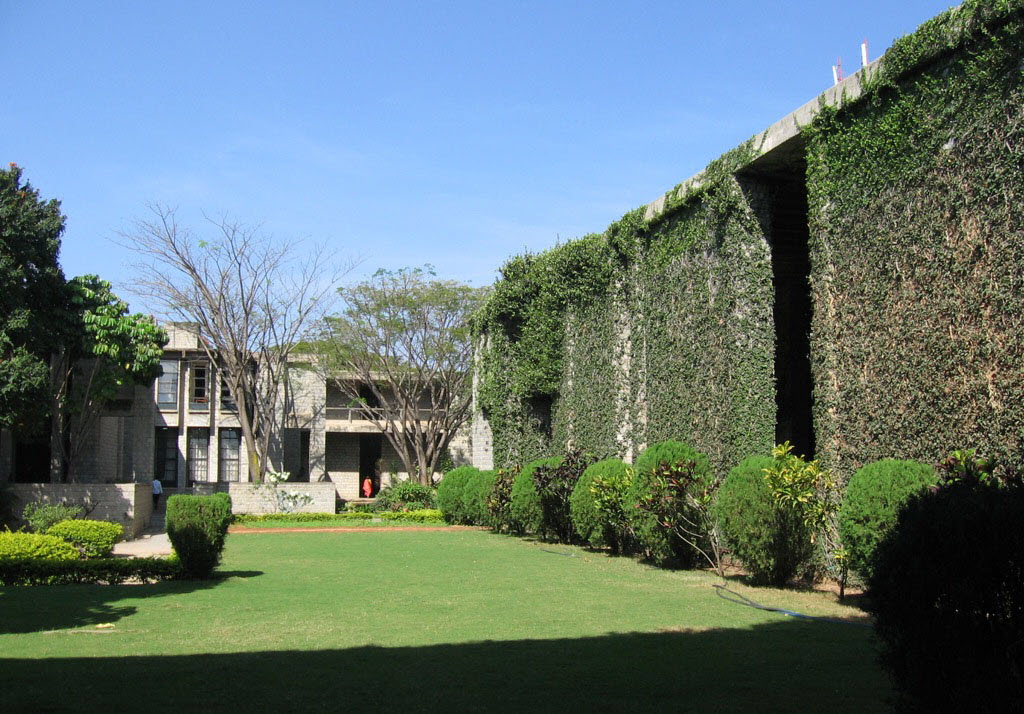
Indian Institute of Management Bangalore, Bangalore

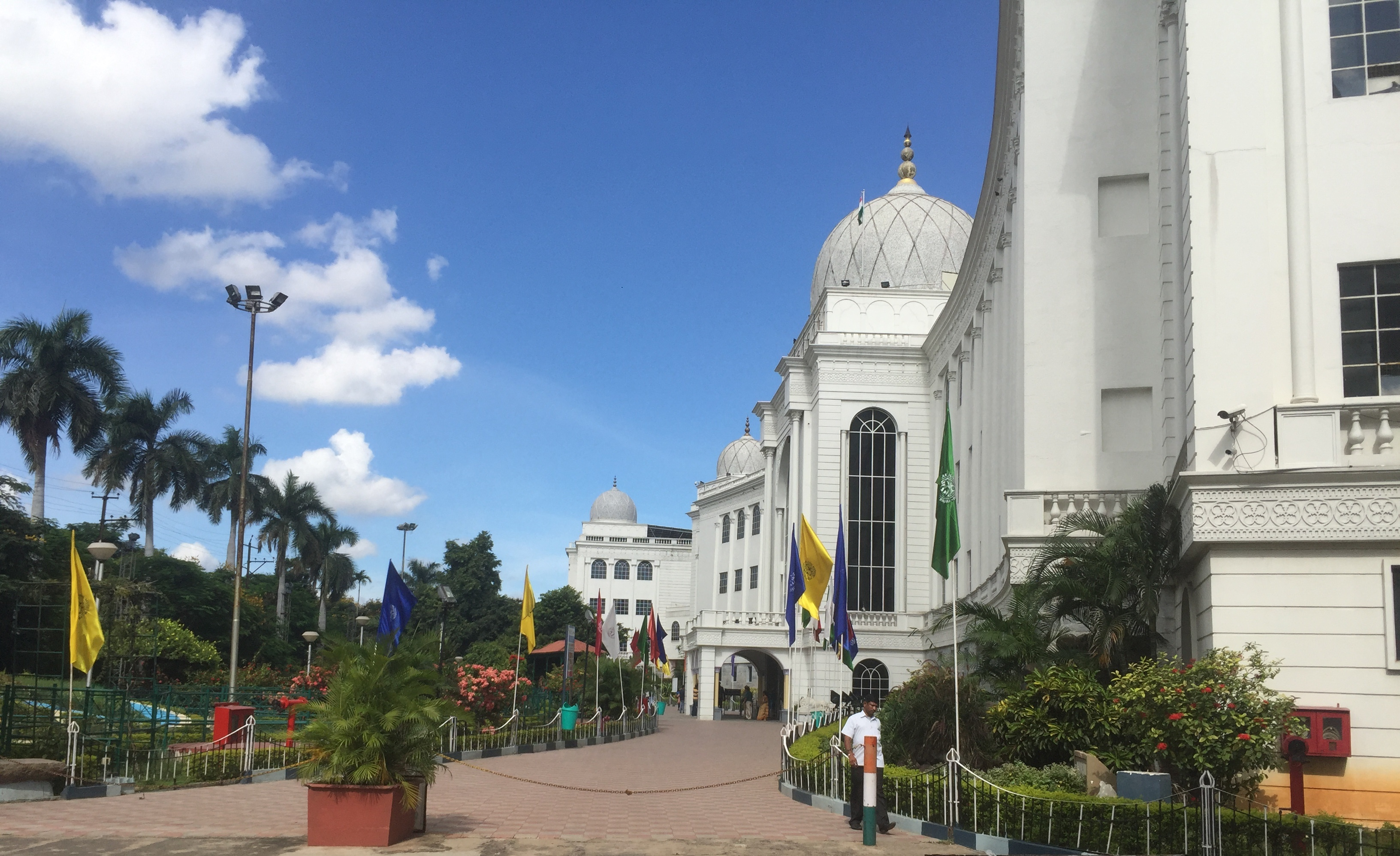
Salar Jung Museum, Hyderabad

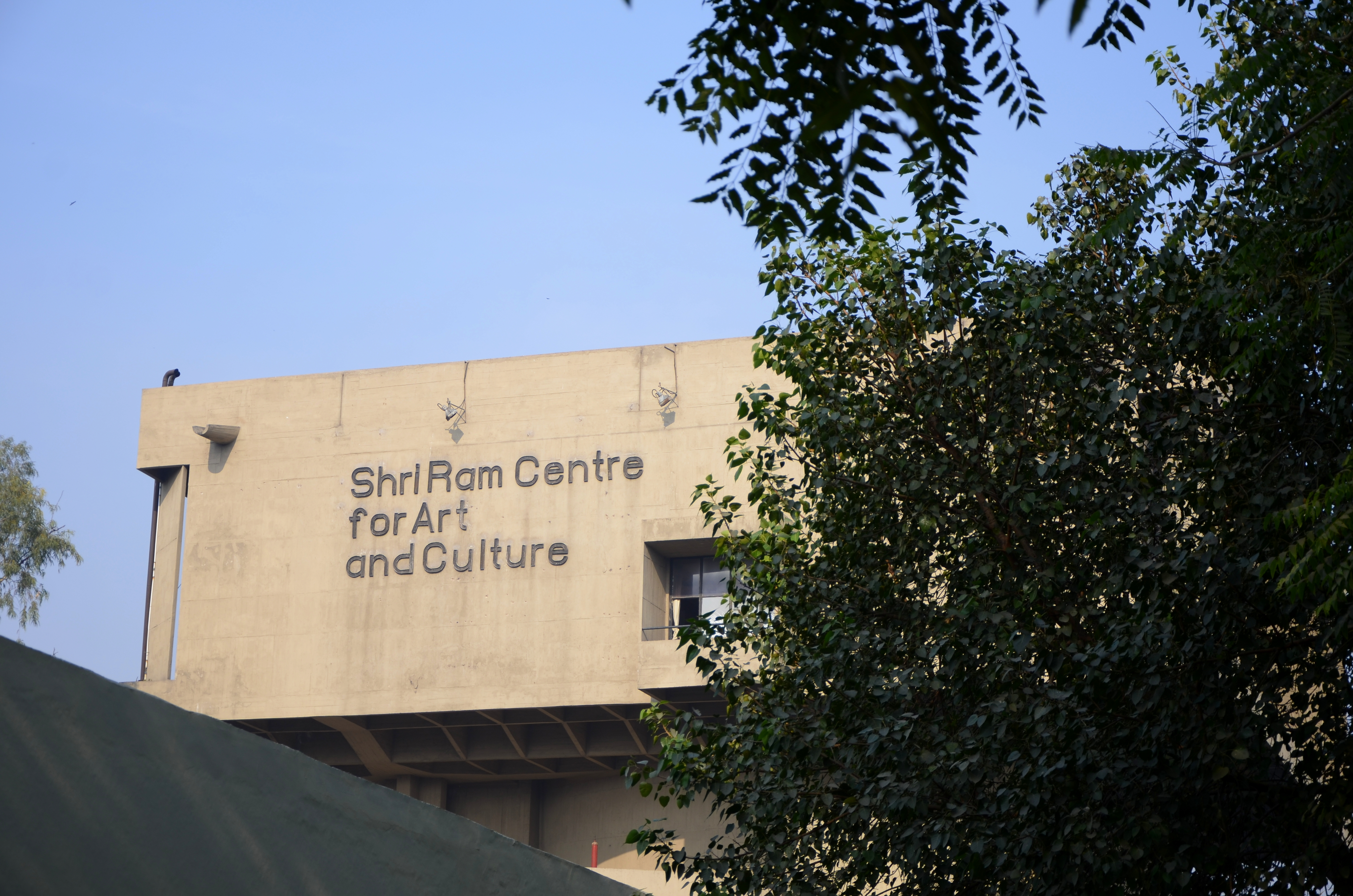
Shri Ram Centre for Performing Arts, Delhi (with Shiv Nath Prasad, 1966-69)

== Published works ==
- The Structure: Works of Mahendra Raj. Mahendra Raj, Vandini Mehta, Rohit Raj Mehrdiratta, Ariel Huber. Zurich: Park Books. 2016. ISBN 978-3-03860-025-1. OCLC 944087142.

== See also ==
- Jugal Kishore Choudhury
- Kuldip Singh (architect)
