= Shantipath =

Street in New Delhi, India

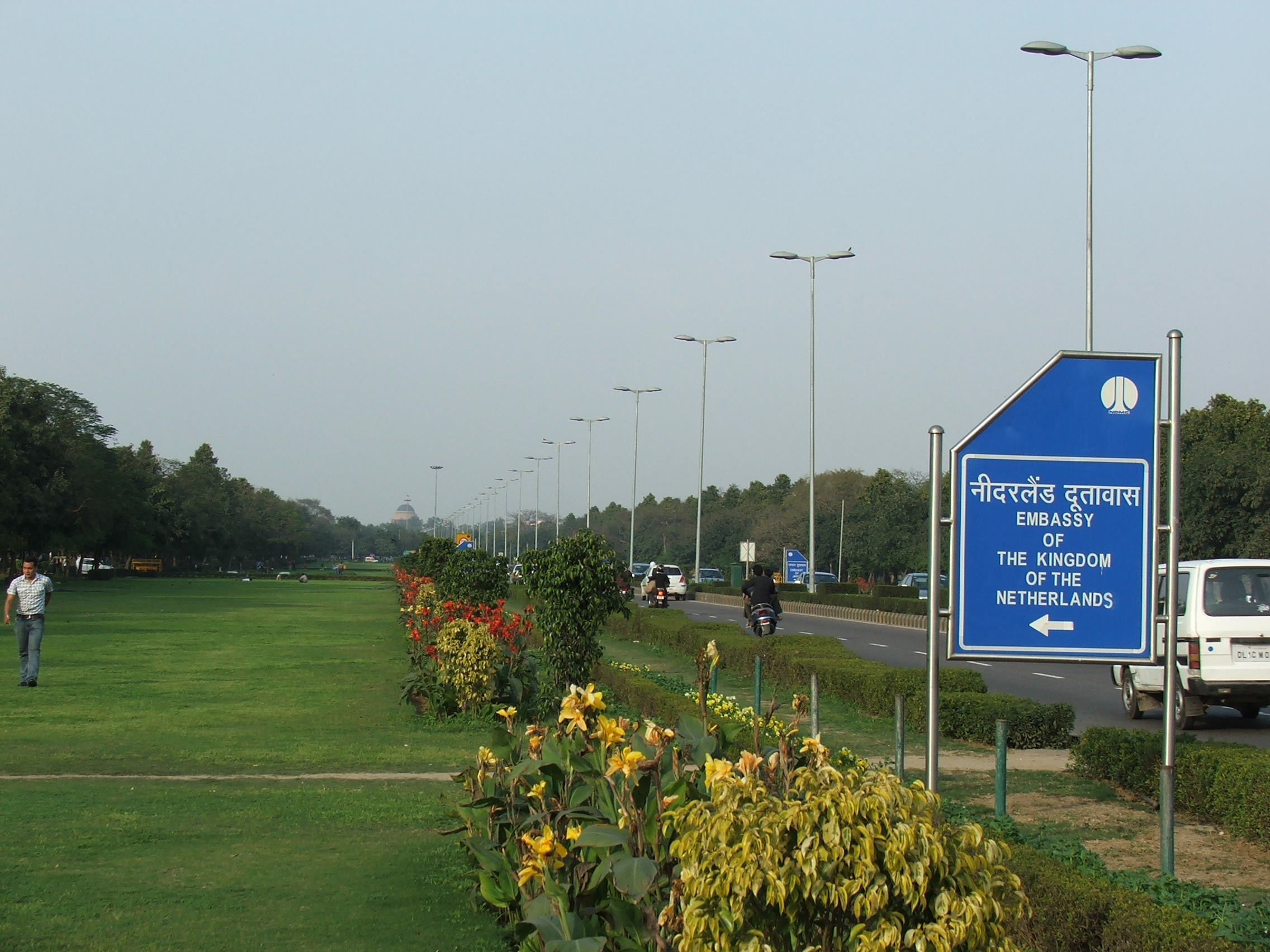
- Interactive map of Shantipath

Shantipath, also written as Shanti Path, is the main road in the diplomatic enclave of Chanakyapuri, New Delhi, India. In Hindi language, its name means "Peace Road". Shantipath is surrounded by green landscape on its either side. A number of foreign embassies in the Indian capital are located on this road. The diplomatic enclave of Chanakyapuri was built in the 1950s, a few years after India gained independence.

This road is heavily guarded, but remains open for public transport. Some of the embassies / high-commissions located here are of Afghanistan, Belgium, USA, Britain, Canada, Germany, Netherlands, Japan, Russia, Sudan, Serbia, France, Pakistan, Australia, China, and Norway.

== See also ==
- Ministry of External Affairs of India
- Kartavyapath
