= Chanakyapuri =

- Sub-Division
- Location in Delhi, India
- Coordinates: 28.59153°N 77.171895°E
- Country: India
- State: Delhi
- District: New Delhi

Government
  - Body: New Delhi Municipal Council
  - Member of Parliament: Bansuri Swaraj

Area
  - Total: 6.085 km^{2} (2.349 sq mi)
- Elevation: 236.67 m (776.5 ft)

Languages
  - Official: Hindi, English
- Time zone: UTC+5:30 (IST)
- PIN: 110021
- Lok Sabha constituency: New Delhi
- Civic agency: NDMC

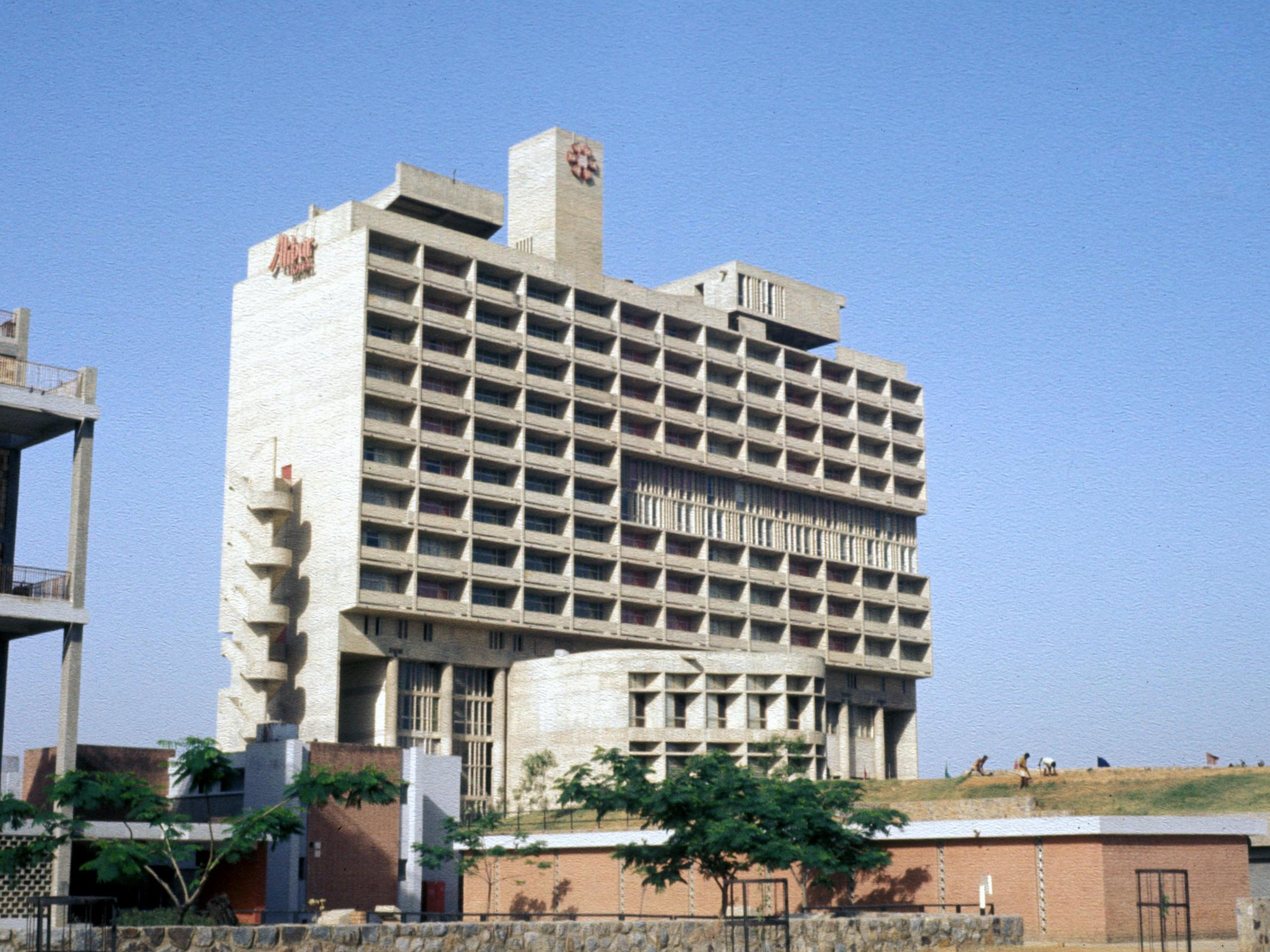
Akbar Hotel in Chanakyapuri, constructed 1965-1969

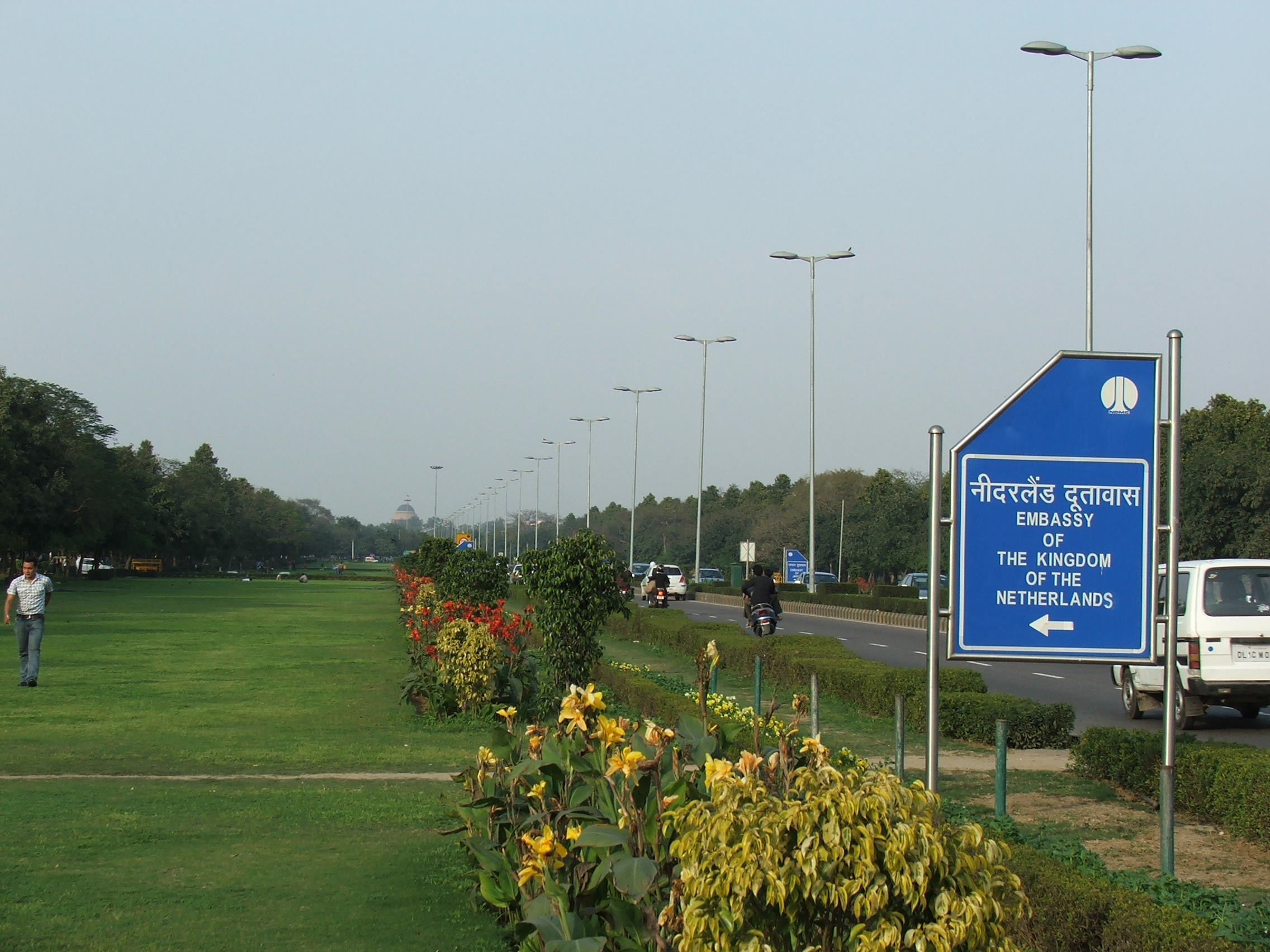
Shantipath is lined with embassies

Chanakyapuri (Sanskrit: चाणक्यपुरी, romanized: Cāṅakyapurī) is a neighbourhood and diplomatic enclave established in the 1950s in New Delhi, India. It is also a sub-division of the New Delhi district and plays host to the majority of foreign embassies in New Delhi. Chanakyapuri, meaning "city of Chanakya", is named after Chanakya, an ancient Indian diplomat, philosopher, politician, military strategist and advisor to Maurya Emperor Chandragupta Maurya.

== History ==
Chanakyapuri was the first major extension of New Delhi beyond Lutyens' Delhi. The Central Public Works Department (CPWD) developed a large area of land to create this diplomatic enclave in the 1950s. The area was built on land acquired from the former village of the Gurjar community, along with smaller adjoining tracts. Subsequently, this land was allotted to embassies, chanceries, high commissions and ambassador residences. The enclave is built around a wide central vista, known as Shanti Path (Peace Road), with wide green areas. A large landscaped park spread over an area of 80 acres, known as Nehru Park, was developed in 1969 for the families of the diplomatic personnel. In time, two markets, two colleges and schools run by diplomatic missions (including The British School and the American Embassy School) were established in the neighbourhood.

The Akbar Hotel was constructed 1965-69 for the India Tourism Development Corporation by Shiv Nath Prasad. Around it Yashwant Place was constructed for shopping and eating. A movie theatre Chanakya Cinema was added in 1969, built in the Brutalist architecture style. The cinema was later torn down and the plot redeveloped into a shopping mall with a new cinema in 2017.

== Accessibility ==
Major roads in Chanakyapuri include Shanti Path, Nyaya Marg, Niti Marg, Chandragupta Marg and Panchsheel Marg. In addition to these, the Ring Road traverses the southern expanse of the neighbourhood and intersects National Highway 8 on the border with neighbouring Dhaula Kuan. Sardar Patel Marg marks the western periphery, while the Chanakya Cinema complex, which lies beyond Nehru Park, forms the south-western perimeter. The Delhi Ring Railway stops at Chanakyapuri, while Lok Kalyan Marg and Jor Bagh are the nearest stations of Delhi Metro.

== Education ==
=== Primary and secondary schools ===
- The American Embassy School, New Delhi, for expatriates from the US and other countries.
- The British School offers the National Curriculum for England, the IGCSE and IB. It primarily serves the international community
- German School New Delhi
- Russian Embassy School in Delhi
- Sanskriti School, a renowned education institution, which mainly serves the children of civil servants.
- Navy Children School, Delhi which mainly serves the children of Naval staff.
- Carmel Convent School - a K to 12 convent school for girls located in Malcha Marg. Follows the CBSE curriculum

=== Universities ===
- Jesus and Mary College, a constituent college of the University of Delhi.
- Maitreyi College, another constituent college of the University of Delhi.
- South Asian University, an international university established by the SAARC.

== See also ==
- Ministry of External Affairs of India
- Areas And Zones of New Delhi
- Lutyens' Delhi
