= List of film schools =

The following is a list of notable film schools that are active, grouped by country.

Around the world, there are both public and private institutions dedicated to teaching film either as a department within a larger university, or as a stand-alone entity. There is also a distinction between film programs in existing private colleges and art schools, and purely for-profit institutions. The popularity of film and television production courses has exponentially increased since the 1980s and there are now more than 1,200 known institutions offering such courses around the world.

== Africa ==
School	Location	Country	Control	Type	Enrollment	Founded	CILECT Member
National Film and Television Institute (NAFtTI)	Accra	Ghana	Public			1978	Yes
Open Window Institute - School of Film Arts	Pretoria	South Africa	Private	Bachelor of Film Arts	800	1993	No
South African School of Motion Picture Medium and Live Performance - AFDA	Johannesburg, Cape Town, Durban, Port Elizabeth	South Africa	Private	Baccalaureate college	1100	1992	Yes
École supérieure des arts visuels de Marrakech (Esav Marrakech)	Morocco, Marrakech	North Africa	Private	Bachelor of Film Arts	1000	2006	No

== Asia/Pacific ==
School	Location	Country	Control	Type	Enrollment	Founded	CILECT Member
Jatiya Kabi Kazi Nazrul Islam University	Mymensingh	Bangladesh	Public University	Film & Media Studies	30	2007	No
O.P. Jindal Global University (Jindal School of Journalism and Communication)	Sonipat	India	Private University	Film and Media Studies			
Jahangirnagar University (Department of Drama and Dramatics)	Savar	Bangladesh	Public University	Baccalaureate college	10,100	1970	No
Beijing Film Academy	Beijing	China	Film School	Film and Television School		1950	Yes
Central Academy of Drama (Department of Film & TV Art)	Beijing	China	Public University	Film and Television School		1949	Yes
Communications University of China (School of Film and Cinematic Arts)	Beijing	China	Public University	Film and Television School		1954	Yes
Zhejiang University of Media and Communications	Hangzhou	China	Public University	Film and Television School		1978	Yes
Hong Kong Baptist University (Academy of Film)	Hong Kong	China	Public University	Film and Television School		1994	Yes
Hong Kong Academy for Performing Arts (School of Film and Television)	Hong Kong	China	Public University	Film and Television School		1984	Yes
City University of Hong Kong (School of Creative Media)	Hong Kong	China					
Satyajit Ray Film and Television Institute	Kolkata	India	Film School	Film and Television School		1995	Yes
M.G.R. Government Film and Television Training Institute	Chennai	India	Film School	Film and Television School		1945	No
Film and Television Institute of India	Pune	India	Film School	Film and Television School		1960	Yes
Whistling Woods International	Mumbai	India	Film School	Film and Television School		2006	Yes
State Institute of Film and Television	Rohtak	India	Public University	Film and Television School		2011	No
Jyoti Chitraban Film and Television Institute	Guwahati	India	Directorate of Technical Education	Diploma		1999	No
Annapurna College of Film and Media	Hyderabad	India	Private not-for-profit	BA, MA and MMBA degrees		2011	Yes
Government Film and Television Institute	Bangalore	India	Directorate of Technical Education	Diploma		1943	No
Institute of Creative Excellence	Mumbai	India	Film School	Diploma		2012	No
National Institute of Design	Ahmedabad	India					No
Sam Higginbottom University of Agriculture, Technology and Sciences (School of Film and Mass Communication)	Allahabad	India					No
A.J.K. Mass Communication Research Centre	New Delhi	India	Jamia Millia Islamia				No
K. R. Narayanan National Institute of Visual Science and Arts	Kottayam	India					Yes
Srishti Institute of Art Design and Technology	Bangalore	India					No
Makhanlal Chaturvedi National University of Journalism and Communication	Bhopal	India	Public University	Journalism School		2021	No
Indonesia Institute of Arts	Yogyakarta	Indonesia	Film School	Film and Television School		1950	No
Multimedia Nusantara University (College of Arts and Design, Department of Film)	Tangerang	Indonesia					No
SAE Institute Indonesia	Jakarta	Indonesia	SAE Institute (private)				No
Japan Institute of the Moving Image	Kawasaki, Kanagawa	Japan	Film School	Film and Television School		1975	Yes
Nihon University (College of Art, Department of Cinema)	Tokyo	Japan	Film School	Research University		1921	Yes
University of the Philippines Film Institute	Quezon City	Philippines	University of the Philippines (public)	Film School		2003	Yes
Asia Pacific Film Institute	Mandaluyong	Philippines	Private	Film School			No
De La Salle–College of Saint Benilde (School of Design and Arts)	Malate, Manila	Philippines	Private				No
International Academy of Film and Television	Lapu-Lapu	Philippines	Private	Film School			No
Mapúa University	Intramuros	Philippines					No
Mowelfund Film Institute		Philippines					No
University of San Carlos		Philippines	Private				No
Nanyang Polytechnic (School of Interactive & Digital Media)	Singapore	Singapore	Film School	Polytechnic		2006	Yes
Nanyang Technological University (School of Art, Design and Media)	Singapore	Singapore	Public University			1992	Yes
Ngee Ann Polytechnic (School of Film & Media Studies)	Singapore	Singapore	Film School	Polytechnic		1989	Yes
LASALLE College of the Arts (Puttnam School of Film & Animation)	Singapore	Singapore	Public University			2011	Yes
Tisch School of the Arts Asia	Singapore	Singapore	New York University Tisch School of the Arts				No
SAE Institute Singapore	Singapore	Singapore	SAE Institute (private)				No
Temasek Polytechnic	Singapore	Singapore					No
Nanyang Academy of Fine Arts	Singapore	Singapore					No
Dong-ah Institute of Media and Arts	Anseong	South Korea	Film School	Technical School		1997	Yes
Chung-Ang University (Performance Film Creation)	Seoul and Anseong	South Korea					No
Dongguk University (Division of Theatre & Film and Media)	Seoul	South Korea					Yes
Busan Asian Film School	Busan	South Korea					Yes
Hanyang University		South Korea	Private				No
Korea National University of Arts (School of Film, TV & Multimedia)	Seoul	South Korea	Public				No
Seoul Institute of the Arts (Department of Film)	Seoul	South Korea				1978	No
Multimedia University, or MMU (Faculty of Creative Multimedia, Cinematic Arts)	Johor	Malaysia	Private	Film program			No
Mahidol University International College (Fine and Applied Arts)	Salaya	Thailand	Mahidol University	Entertainment media program			No

=== Pakistan ===
- University of Lahore (School of Creative Arts) Lahore
- Shaheed Zulfikar Ali Bhutto Institute of Science and Technology, Karachi
- University of Karachi (Department of Visual Studies), Karachi
- Iqra University, Karachi
- National College of Arts, Lahore
- Beaconhouse National University, Lahore
- Punjab University, Lahore

=== Middle East ===
Israel

- Tel Aviv University Department of Film and Television, Tel Aviv
- Bezalel Academy of Arts and Design, Jerusalem
- Sam Spiegel Film and Television School, Jerusalem
- Sapir Academic College, Sderot

Jordan

- Yarmouk University
- Amman Filmmakers Cooperative
- Red Sea Institute of Cinematic Arts

==== Lebanon ====
- Holy Spirit University of Kaslik
- Lebanese Academy of Fine Arts
- Lebanese American University
- Notre Dame University – Louaize

United Arab Emirates

- The College of Architecture, Art & Design at the American University of Sharjah

Syria

- The College of Art, Cinema and Theater Department Arab International University

- The High Institute For Cinema Ministry Of Culture

=== Oceania ===
School	Location	Country	Control	Type	Enrollment	Founded	CILECT Member (for-profit)
Footscray City Films	Melbourne	Australia	Private (for-profit)	Special-focus institution	80	1981	No
MAPS Film School	Adelaide	Australia	Private (for-profit)	Special-focus institution	45	1983	No
Griffith Film School	Brisbane	Australia	Public University	Baccalaureate college	1000	1971	Yes
University of Melbourne (Victorian College of the Arts)	Melbourne	Australia	Public University	Research university/VH	38,281	1853	Yes
Deakin University	Melbourne	Australia	Public University	Research university/VH	52,000	1974	No
Australian Film Television and Radio School	Multiple	Australia	Private (for-profit)	Master's university		1973	Yes
RMIT School of Media and Communication (Department of Film and Television)	Melbourne	Australia	Private (for-profit)	Baccalaureate college		2009	No
Bond University	Gold Coast	Australia	Private (for-profit)	Baccalaureate college		1987	No
Film and Television Institute	Fremantle	Australia	Private (for-profit)	Baccalaureate college		1987	No
WA Screen Academy	Mount Lawley	Australia	Private (for-profit)	Master's university		2005	Yes
SAE Institute	Multiple	Australia	Private (for-profit)	Special-focus institution		1976	No
University of Queensland	Brisbane	Australia	Public	Research university/VH	46,826	1909	No
University of Auckland (School of Film, Television & Media Studies, Screen Production)	Auckland	New Zealand	Film School	Public University			Yes
Auckland University of Technology (School of Communication Studies)	Auckland	New Zealand					No
South Seas Film and Television School	Auckland	New Zealand					No
Unitec New Zealand (School of Performing and Screen Arts)	Auckland	New Zealand					No
The New Zealand Film & Television School	Wellington	New Zealand					No
Sydney Film School	Sydney	Australia	Private (for-profit)			2004	No

== Europe ==
School	Location	Country	Control	Type Film School	Enrollment	Founded	CILECT Member
Icelandic Film School	Reykjavík	Iceland	Private	Film School		1992	Yes
Focus Movie Academy	Milan, Florence	Italy	Private	Film School		2013	No
Prague Film Institute	Prague	Czech Republic	Private	Higher Nationals Film School		1999	No
Prague Film School	Prague	Czech Republic	Private	Film School	100	2002	No
Roma Film Academy (formerly, NUCT Scuola Internazionale Cinema e Televisione)	Rome	Italy	Private	Film and Television School	limited	2014	No
International School of Audiovisual Creation and Realisation	Paris, Nice, and Rennes	France	Private	Film & Television School		1972	No
Gerasimov Institute of Cinematography (VGIK)	Moscow	Russia	Public University			1919	Yes
High Courses for Scriptwriters and Film Directors ^{[see: in Russian]}	Moscow	Russia					No
GITR Film and Television school	Moscow	Russia					Yes
Centro Sperimentale di Cinematografia	Rome	Italy	Public Institution			1935	Yes
SAE Institute	Milan	Italy	Private	arts college			No
Istituto Europeo di Design	Milan	Italy					
Film and TV School of the Academy of Performing Arts in Prague - FAMU	Prague	Czech Republic	Public University			1946	Yes
National Film School of Denmark	Copenhagen	Denmark				1966	Yes
European Film College	Ebeltoft	Denmark	Folk High School			1993	Yes
Baltic Film and Media School	Tallinn	Estonia	Public University			2005	Yes
Academy of Media Arts Cologne	Cologne	Germany	Public University			1990	Yes
Deutsche Film- und Fernsehakademie Berlin	Berlin	Germany	Film School			1966	Yes
Konrad Wolf Film University of Babelsberg	Potsdam	Germany	Public university			1954	Yes
Filmakademie Baden-Württemberg	Ludwigsburg	Germany	Film School			1991	Yes
International Film School Cologne	Cologne	Germany	Film School			2000	Yes
Stuttgart Media University	Stuttgart	Germany	Public university			2001	No
Film School of the Aristotle University	Thessaloniki	Greece	Public University			2004	No
American University of Paris	Paris	France	Private			1962	No
La Femis (formerly IDHEC)	Paris	France	Public University			1944	Yes
École Supérieure d'Audiovisuel (ENSAV)	Toulouse	France	University of Toulouse-Jean Jaurès			1978	Yes
The International Film School of Paris (EICAR)	Paris	France	Private	Film school			
École nationale supérieure Louis-Lumière	Paris	France		Film school		1926	Yes
National Film School in Łódź (formerly The Leon Schiller National Higher School of Film, Television and Theatre in Łódź)	Łódź	Poland	Public University	Film school		1948	Yes
Krastyo Sarafov National Academy for Theatre and Film Arts	Sofia	Bulgaria	Public University			1948	Yes
Filmacademy Vienna	Vienna	Austria	Public University			1952	Yes
National Film and Television School	Beaconsfield, Buckinghamshire	United Kingdom	Educational Charity	Postgraduate Film, Television and Games school	ca. 300	1971	Yes
Bournemouth Film School	Bournemouth	United Kingdom	Public University	Film School	250	1963	Yes
Lisbon Theatre and Film School	Lisbon	Portugal	Public University			1971	Yes
Screen Academy Scotland -	Edinburgh	Scotland	Public University			2004	Yes
Film School in Pisek	Písek	Czech Republic	Private			2004	No
London Film School	London	United Kingdom	Educational Charity	Postgraduate Film School	ca. 250	1956	Yes
Krzysztof Kieślowski Film School	Katowice	Poland	University of Silesia (public)	Film & Television School	ca. 600	1978	No
The Madrid Film School (or ECAM)	Madrid	Spain	Cultural Foundation	Film & Television School	ca. 300	1994	Yes
National Film School	Dublin	Ireland	Dún Laoghaire Institute of Art, Design and Technology				
Netherlands Film Academy	Amsterdam	Netherlands	Amsterdam University of the Arts	Film & Television School	-	1958	Yes
RITCS (Royal Institute for Theatre, Cinema and Sound)	Brussels	Belgium	Erasmus Brussels University of Applied Sciences and Arts	Film, Television, Theater School	-	1962	Yes
Catholic University of Portugal (School of Arts)	Porto	Portugal					
The Norwegian Filmschool	Lillehammer	Norway	Lillehammer University College				
Caragiale Academy of Theatrical Arts and Cinematography	Bucharest	Romania				1950	
Academy of Arts, Belgrade	Belgrade	Serbia					
Kyiv National I. K. Karpenko-Kary Theatre, Cinema and Television University	Kyiv	Ukraine					
Academy of Performing Arts in Bratislava, or VSMU (Faculty of Film and Television)	Bratislava	Slovakia					
Swedish Institute of Dramatic Art	Stockholm	Sweden					
University of Gothenburg (School of Film Directing)	Gothenburg	Sweden					

=== Turkey ===
- Istanbul Bilgi University
- Istanbul Kültür University (IKU), CILECT Member.
- Istanbul University (Faculty of Communication, Radio, TV and Cinema).
- Izmir University of Economics (Faculty of Communication, Department of Cinema and Digital Media)
- Mimar Sinan Fine Arts University
- Anadolu university Film Design.

=== United Kingdom ===
The following film schools are internationally accredited by the International Association of Film and Television Schools, or CILECT.

- Bournemouth Film School, Arts University Bournemouth
- Falmouth University,
- University of Hertfordshire
- London Film School
- Met Film School
- National Film and Television School
- Film & TV School Wales, University of South Wales
- Northern Film School at Leeds Beckett University
- Screen Academy Scotland, Napier University
- University for the Creative Arts at Farnham
- Westminster Film School, University of Westminster

Other schools (which may accredited by Creative Skillset):

- University of Bristol, Department of Drama
- University of Gloucestershire
- Goldsmiths, University of London
- Kingston University, London
- Skillset Screen Academy at LCC, University of the Arts London
- London Film Academy
- Manchester School of Art, Manchester Metropolitan University
- Middlesex University, Hendon, London
- Richmond University, London
- Ravensbourne College of Design & Communication

== North America ==
School	Location	Country	Control	Type	Enrollment	Founded	CILECT Member
Centro de Capacitación Cinematográfica (CCC)	Mexico City	Mexico	Secretariat of Culture, Government of Mexico (public)	Film school		1975	Yes
Centro Universitario de Estudios Cinematográficos (CUEC)	Mexico City	Mexico	National Autonomous University of Mexico (public)	Film school			No
Escuela Nacional de Artes Cinematográficas	Mexico City	Mexico	Public university			1963	Yes
University of Regina - Dept. of Media Production & Studies	Regina, Saskatchewan	Canada	Public university	Doctoral university/R2		1970	No
Simon Fraser University - Faculty of Communication, Art and Technology	Burnaby, British Columbia	Canada	Public University	Doctoral university/R2	34000	1965	No
Queen's University Department of Film and Media	Kingston, Ontario	Canada	Public university	Doctoral university/R1	23,883	1841	No
Toronto Film School	Toronto, Ontario	Canada	Private College	Diploma		1928	No
Toronto Metropolitan University School of Image Arts: Film Department	Toronto, Ontario	Canada	Public university	Doctoral university/R2		1948	Yes
Ontario College of Art & Design Faculty of Arts: Integrated Media Department	Toronto, Ontario	Canada	Public university	Master's university/S	6,072	1876	No
Vancouver Institute of Media Arts (VanArts)	Vancouver, British Columbia	Canada	Private	Diploma		1995	No
InFocus Film School	Vancouver, British Columbia	Canada	Private College	Diploma	250	2010	No
Vancouver Film School	Vancouver, British Columbia	Canada	Private			1987	No
Langara College	Vancouver, British Columbia	Canada	Public College		8,350	1970	No
University of British Columbia	Kelowna and Vancouver, British Columbia	Canada	Public university	Doctoral university/R1	57,075	1908	No
Emily Carr University of Art and Design	Vancouver, British Columbia	Canada	Public University	Art & Design	1,828	1925	No
Mel Hoppenheim School of Cinema (Concordia)	Montreal, Quebec	Canada	Public university	Doctoral university/R2		1997	No
Gulf Islands Film and Television School (GIFTS)	Galiano Island, British Columbia	Canada	Public Institution	Certificate		1995	No
Sheridan College School of Animation, Arts and Design: Media Arts; Advanced Television and Film	Oakville, Ontario	Canada	Public University			1967	Yes
York University Department of Film	Toronto, Ontario	Canada	Public university	Doctoral university/R2	53,900	1959	Yes
Capilano University	North Vancouver and Squamish, British Columbia	Canada	Public university	Baccalaureate university	7,500	1968	No
Nova Scotia College of Art and Design University	Halifax, Nova Scotia	Canada	Public University		971	1887	No
Red Deer College	Red Deer, Alberta	Canada	Public comprehensive community college		7,000	1964	No
SAIT Polytechnic	Calgary, Alberta	Canada	Public university	Baccalaureate university	17,516	1916	No
Université du Québec à Montréal	Montreal, Quebec	Canada	Public university	Research university/H	41,296	1969	Yes

== South America ==
School	Location	Country	Control	Type	Enrollment	Founded	CILECT Member
National School of Film Experimentation and Production (ENERC)	Buenos Aires	Argentina	Public University			1965	Yes
University of São Paulo	São Paulo	Brazil	Public University	Research university/VH			Yes
Federal University of Santa Catarina	Florianópolis	Brazil	Public University			2005	No
Pontifical Catholic University of Rio de Janeiro	Rio de Janeiro	Brazil	Private				No
Pontifical Catholic University of Rio Grande do Sul	Porto Alegre	Brazil	Private				No
State University of Campinas	Campinas	Brazil	Public University				No
Fluminense Federal University	Rio de Janeiro	Brazil	Public University				No
Federal University of Minas Gerais	Belo Horizonte	Brazil	Public University				No
Estácio de Sá University	Rio de Janeiro	Brazil	Private				No
University of Chile	Santiago	Chile	Public University	Research university/VH			No
University for the Arts, Sciences, and Communication		Chile	Private				No
Audiovisual Arts School of the Universidad Autónoma de Bucaramanga, UNAB		Colombia	Private University				No
Film and TV School of the National University of Colombia	Bogotá	Colombia	Public University	Research university/VH			Yes
Central University	Bogotá	Colombia	Private University				No
Iberoamerican Documentary Film School	Mérida	Venezuela	Open University				No
Escuela Nacional de Cine	Caracas	Venezuela	Private				No
Federal University of Santa Catarina (Cinema)	Florianopolis	Brazil					No
Escuela Internacional de Cine y Televisión	San Antonio de los Baños	Cuba	Private			1986	Yes

== See also ==
- List of film institutes
- Film school
