= Dada Lakhmi Chand State University of Performing and Visual Arts =

State university located in Rohtak, India

- Motto: कला साधना परम दैवतम्
- Motto in English: Artistic Practice is the Supreme Divine
- Type: Public
- Established: 2014; 12 years ago
- Affiliations: UGC
- Chancellor: Governor of Haryana
- Vice-Chancellor: Amit Arya
- Location: Rohtak, Haryana, India; 28°54′31″N 76°36′24″E
- Campus: Urban, 36 acres (0.1 km^{2})
Colors
- Website: dlcsupva.ac.in

Dada Lakhmi Chand State University of Performing and Visual Arts, located in Rohtak city of Haryana state of India.

== History ==
On 5 August 2014, the SUPVA university was established through Haryana Act No. 24 of 2014 by integrating four government technical institutions, namely State Institute of Fine Arts, State Institute of Design, State Institute of Film & Television, and State Institute of Urban Planning & Architecture which were further developed at the cost of Rs.300.0 crores by Govt. of Haryana through Government Technical Institution Society, Rohtak.

== Campus ==
The 36 acres campus, designed by the renowned architect Raj Rewal, and well-connected by road and rail networks is 1.5 km north of Rohtak Bus stand, 5 km northeast of Rohtak Junction railway station, 85 km west of Delhi IGI Airport, and 220 km south of state capital Chandigarh. It has following facilities

- Seminar halls
- Laboratories
- Workshops and studios
- Central facilities like an auditorium, seminar halls, and a central library
- A girls' hostel accommodating 170 students, there is however no hostel facilities for male students.
- Housing facilities for faculty.

== Academic programs ==
Programme Intake for UG & PG Programmes
| Sr. No. | Programme | Faculty | Department | Intake |
|---|---|---|---|---|
| 1 | Bachelor of Design - Fashion Design | Design | Fashion Design | 30 |
| 2 | Bachelor of Design - Fashion & Lifestyle Design | Design | Fashion & Lifestyle Design | 25 |
| 3 | Bachelor of Design - Product Design | Design | Product Design | 20 |
| 4 | Bachelor of Design - Textile Design | Design | Textile Design | 25 |
| 5 | Bachelor of Fine Arts - Direction | Film & Television | Direction | 15 |
| 6 | Bachelor of Fine Arts - Cinematography | Film & Television | Cinematography | 15 |
| 7 | Bachelor of Fine Arts - Editing | Film & Television | Editing | 15 |
| 8 | Bachelor of Fine Arts - Audiography | Film & Television | Audiography | 15 |
| 9 | Bachelor of Fine Arts - Acting | Film & Television | Acting | 15 |
| 10 | Bachelor of Architecture | Planning & Architecture | Architecture | 40 |
| 11 | Bachelor of Visual Arts - Applied Arts | Visual Arts | Applied Arts | 25 |
| 12 | Bachelor of Visual Arts - Painting | Visual Arts | Painting | 25 |
| 13 | Bachelor of Visual Arts - Sculpture | Visual Arts | Sculpture | 10 |
| 14 | Bachelor of Visual Arts - Animation & Multimedia | Visual Arts | Animation & Multimedia | 25 |
| 15 | Bachelor of Visual Arts - Printmaking | Visual Arts | Printmaking | 10 |
| 16 | Master of Visual Arts - Applied Art/Painting | Visual Arts | Applied Art/Painting | 30 |
| 17 | Master of Design - Fashion Design | Design | Fashion Design | 30 |
| 18 | Master of Planning - Urban and Regional Planning | Planning & Architecture | Planning & Architecture | 30 |

== Development ==
In April 2025, Chief Minister of Haryana informed that SUPVA has been given responsibility to mentor all universities of the state to start courses in film making. Additionally, process of appointing a consultant for building a Panchkula Film City on existing 100 acre government land in HMT Kalka is underway, and land for Gurugram Film City is being identified.

== Issues ==
The Film and Television Department has faced prolonged academic delays, affecting multiple student batches, e.g. 2017-2021 4-year batch completed their degrees in 2024, while 2018-2022 batch is expected to graduate by 2025 or 2026 due to the infrastructural deficiencies and lack of proper filmmaking equipment, faculty shortages and administrative mismanagement. Consequently, there have been various protests by students (2016 and 2023), and 2024 Faculty Protests lasting 77 day and 2023 faculty (2025), recurrence of which as well as the infrastructural and administrative challenges have disrupted the academic environment, contributing to uncertainty and dissatisfaction among the student body.

== See also ==
- Film and Television Institute of India
- Satyajit Ray Film and Television Institute
- Dr. Bhupen Hazarika Regional Government Film and Television Institute
- Biju Patnaik Film and Television Institute of Odisha
- K. R. Narayanan National Institute of Visual Science and Arts
- M.G.R. Government Film and Television Training Institute
- Government Film and Television Institute
- National School of Drama
- Bhartendu Natya Academy
