= List of film schools in the United States =

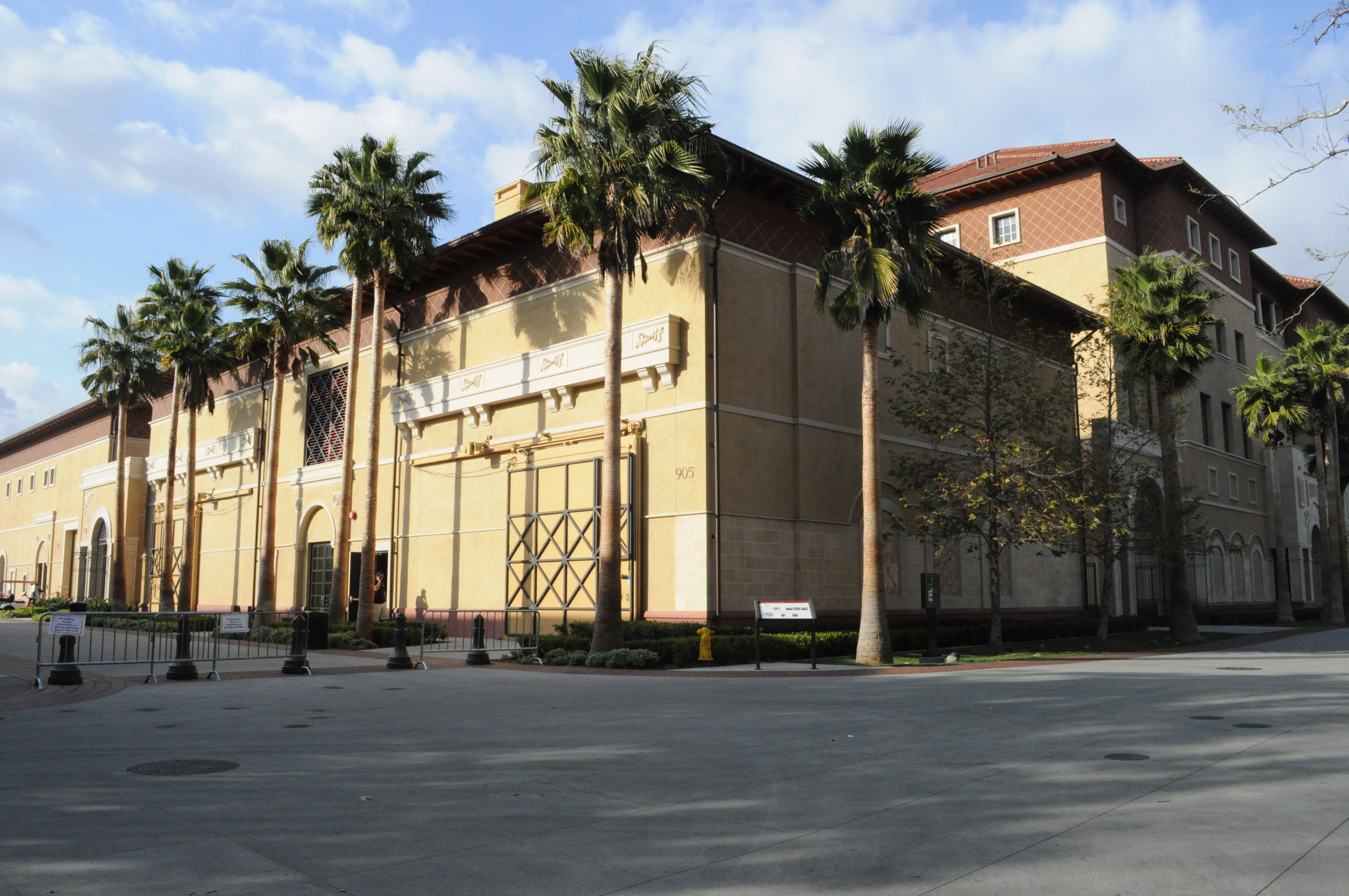
The University of Southern California's School of Cinematic Arts, a private film school in Los Angeles, California

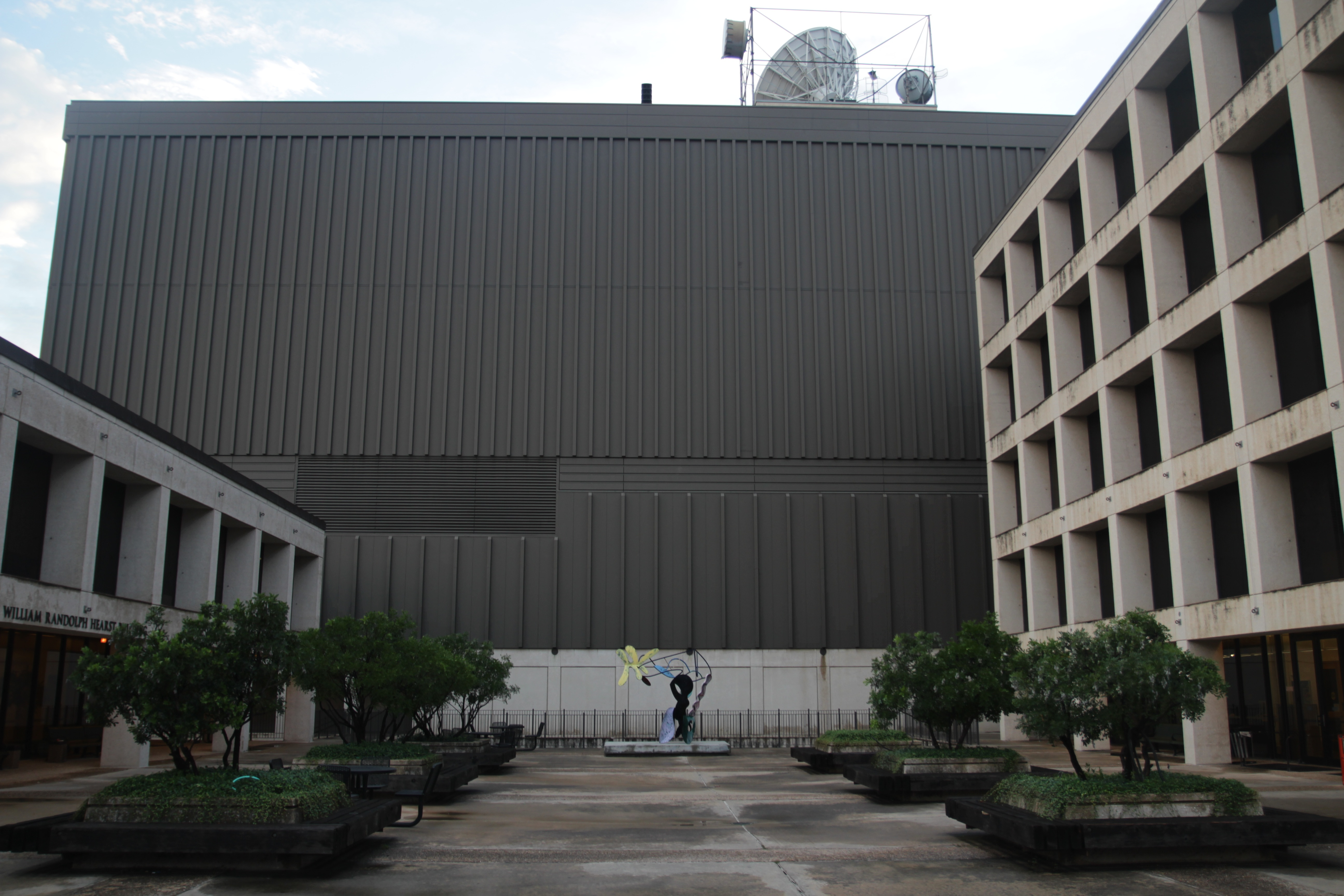
The University of Texas at Austin's Department of Radio-Television-Film, home to the school's public film school in Austin, Texas

In the United States, there are numerous institutions both public and private dedicated to teaching film either as a department in a larger university, or as a stand-alone entity. Colleges offering film degrees as part of their arts or communications curriculum differ from colleges with a dedicated film program, which offer degrees in multiple aspects of filmmaking such as theory, directing, cinematography, and screenwriting.

There is also a distinction between film programs in private colleges and art schools, and purely for-profit institutions.

== Active institutions ==
| University | Department | City | State | Public or Private | Type of Degree | Number of Degrees | Year Established |
|---|---|---|---|---|---|---|---|
| Northern Virginia Community College | Cinema | Woodbridge | Virginia | Public | Associate of Fine Arts | 1 | 2018 |
| Kansas City Art Institute | Filmmaking | Kansas City | Missouri | Private | Baccalaureate college | | |
| Louisiana State University | Department of Theatre | Baton Rouge | Louisiana | Public | Graduate-Doctorate Large | | |
| LSU New Orleans | Film and Theatre | New Orleans | Louisiana | Public | Doctorate Granting University | | |
| Western Colorado Community College | Digital Filmmaking | Grand Junction | Colorado | Public | Associate Degree, Technical Certificates | 2 | 2018 |
| Biola University | Cinema and Media Arts | La Mirada | California | Private | Baccalaureate college | | 1979 |
| University of Colorado Denver | CU Denver Film and Television | Denver | Colorado | Public | Baccalaureate college | 45 | 1994 |
| University of North Alabama | Film & Digital Media Production | Florence | Alabama | Public | Master's university | 25 | |
| Scottsdale Community College | Scottsdale School of Film+Theatre | Scottsdale | Arizona | Public | Associates colleges | | |
| Arizona State University | School of Theatre and Film | Tempe | Arizona | Public | Doctorate Granting University | 4 | 2005 |
| University of Arizona | Jack and Vivian Hanson Arizona Film Institute | Tucson | Arizona | Public | Doctorate Granting University | 85 | 2002 |
| Yavapai College | Zaki Gordon Institute | Sedona | Arizona | Public | Associates colleges | 24 | 2000 |
| University of Central Arkansas | Mass Communication and Theatre | Conway | Arkansas | Public | Masters Universities | 27 | |
| Southern Arkansas University Tech | Multimedia Technology | Camden | Arkansas | Public | Associates colleges | 33 | |
| Academy of Art University | School of Motion Pictures and Television | San Francisco | California | Private | Master's university | 172 | 2004 |
| American Film Institute | American Film Institute Conservatory | Los Angeles | California | Private | Special-focus institutions | 111 | 1969 |
| N/A | City College of San Francisco | San Francisco | California | Public | Associates colleges | Unknown | 1935 |
| N/A | Berkeley Digital Film Institute | Berkeley | California | Private (for-profit) | Associates colleges | Unknown | 2007 |
| Chapman University | Lawrence and Kristina Dodge College of Film and Media Arts | Orange | California | Private | Master's university | 142 | 1996 |
| California College of the Arts | Film Program | Oakland, San Francisco | California | Private | Baccalaureate college | 13 | |
| California Institute of the Arts | School of Film/Video | Valencia | California | Private | Master's university | 96 | 1971 |
| California State University, Los Angeles | Cal State LA Studios | Los Angeles | California | Public | Baccalaureate college | 88 | |
| California State University, Fullerton | Radio-TV-Film | Fullerton | California | Public | Baccalaureate college | 173 | 1989 |
| California State University, Long Beach | Department of Film and Electronic Arts | Long Beach | California | Public | Baccalaureate college | 113 | 1982 |
| California State University, Northridge | Department of Cinema and Television Arts | Northridge | California | Public | Baccalaureate college | 354 | 1983 |
| N/A | Columbia College Hollywood | Tarzana | California | Private | Baccalaureate college | 62 | 1953 |
| Cornish College of the Arts | Film Department | Seattle, Washington | Washington | Private | Baccalaureate college | 62 | 2015 |
| N/A | Global Cinematography Institute | Los Angeles | California | Private | Special-focus institutions | Unknown | 2012 |
| N/A | Los Angeles Film School | Hollywood | California | Private (for-profit) | Associates college | 321 | 1999 |
| Loyola Marymount University | Loyola Marymount University School of Film and Television | Los Angeles | California | Private | Master's university | 57 | 2003 |
| New York Film Academy | New York Film Academy, LA | Universal City | California | Private | Master's university Baccalaureate college Associates colleges | | 1992 |
| San Diego State University | School of Theatre, Television and Film | San Diego | California | Public | Baccalaureate college | | |
| Platt College (San Diego) | Digital Video and Media Production | San Diego | California | Private | Baccalaureate college | | 1985 |
| Studio School (Formerly Known as Relativity School) (Hussian College) | Film + Digital Content | Los Angeles | California | Public | Baccalaureate college | Unknown | 2014 |
| San Francisco Art Institute | School of Studio Practice (film) | San Francisco | California | Private | Master's university | 18 | 1947 |
| San Francisco State University | Cinema Department at San Francisco State University | San Francisco | California | Public | Master's university | 194 | 1965 |
| San Jose State University | Department of TV, Radio, Film & Theatre | San Jose | California | Public | Baccalaureate college | 61 | |
| University of California, Los Angeles | UCLA School of Theater, Film and Television | Los Angeles | California | Public | Doctorate Granting university | 130 | 1939 |
| University of Southern California | USC School of Cinematic Arts | Los Angeles | California | Private | Doctorate Granting university | 379 | 1929 |
| Community College of Aurora | Colorado Film School | Aurora | Colorado | Public | Associate's college | Unknown | 1990s |
| University of Colorado at Boulder | Cinema Studies and Moving Image Arts | Boulder | Colorado | Public | Doctorate Granting University | 95 | 1972 |
| Sacred Heart University | FTMA | Stamford | Connecticut | Private | Master's university | | 2013 |
| Wesleyan University | Center for Film Studies | Middletown | Connecticut | Private | Baccalaureate college | 30 | 2004 |
| American University | Film and Media Arts Studies | Washington D.C. | District of Columbia | Private | Master's university | 90 | 1984 |
| Johns Hopkins University | Film and Media | Baltimore | Maryland | Private | Master's university | 11 | 2015 |
| Howard University | Film and Media Arts | Washington D.C. | District of Columbia | Private | Master's university | 79 | 1971 |
| Florida State University | FSU College of Motion Picture, Television and Recording Arts | Tallahassee, Florida | Florida | Public | Doctorate Granting University | 54 | 1989 |
| N/A | Full Sail University | Winter Park | Florida | Private (for-profit) | Baccalaureate college | 713 | 1979 |
| Ringling College of Art and Design | Digital Filmmaking | Sarasota | Florida | Private | Baccalaureate college | 68 | 2007 |
| University of Central Florida | Film Program | Orlando | Florida | Public | Master's university | 89 | |
| University of Miami | Motion Picture Program | Miami | Florida | Private | Master's university | 99 | 1974 |
| Savannah College of Art and Design | School of Film, Digital Media and Performing Arts | Savannah | Georgia | Private | Master's university | 172 | 1978 |
| Columbia College | Film & Video Department | Chicago | Illinois | Private | Master's university | 445 | 1961 |
| DePaul University | School of Cinema and Interactive Media | Chicago | Illinois | Private | Master's university | 76 | 2008 |
| Northwestern University | Department of Radio, Television + Film | Evanston | Illinois | Private | Master's university | 68 | 1981 |
| School of the Art Institute of Chicago | Film, Video, New Media, and Animation | Chicago | Illinois | Private | Master's university Baccalaureate college | Unknown | 1967 |
| Southern Illinois University Carbondale | Department of Cinema and Photography | Carbondale | Illinois | Public | Master's university | 75 | |
| Tribeca Flashpoint Media Arts Academy | Film + Broadcast Department | Chicago | Illinois | Private | Associates colleges | | 2007 |
| University of Illinois at Urbana–Champaign | Department of Media and Cinema Studies | Champaign-Urbana | Illinois | Public | Doctorate Granting university | 43 | 1948 |
| University of Notre Dame | Department of Film, Television, and Theatre | South Bend | Indiana | Private | Doctorate Granting university | 41 | 1998 |
| University of Iowa | Department of Cinema and Comparative Literature | Iowa City | Iowa | Public | Doctorate Granting University | 58 | |
| Western Kentucky University | Film Program | Bowling Green | Kentucky | Public | Doctorate Granting university | | 2010 |
| Towson University | Department of Electronic Media and Film | Towson | Maryland | Public | Baccalaureate college | 121 | 1981 |
| Boston University | Department of Film & Television | Boston | Massachusetts | Private | Master's university | 208 | 1947 |
| University of Rhode Island | Harrington School of Communication and Media | Kingston and Providence | Rhode Island | Public | Baccalaureate college | | 2008 |
| Emerson College | Visual and Media Arts | Boston | Massachusetts | Private | Master's university | 368 | 1972 |
| Fitchburg State University | Film/Video | Fitchburg | Massachusetts | Public | Baccalaureate college | 56 | |
| Massachusetts College of Art and Design | Department of film/video | Boston | Massachusetts | Public | Master's university Baccalaureate college | 79 | 1977 |
| Grand Valley State University | Film and Video Production | Allendale | Michigan | Public | Baccalaureate college | Unknown | Unknown |
| Minnesota State University Moorhead | Cinema Arts and Digital Technologies | Moorhead | Minnesota | Public | Baccalaureate college | 26 | |
| University of Southern Mississippi | Entertainment Industry (Film) | Long Beach | Mississippi | Public | Baccalaureate college | Unknown | Unknown |
| Missouri State University | Department of Media, Journalism & Film | Springfield | Missouri | Public | Master's university | 67 | |
| Webster University | Film Production and Film Studies | Saint Louis | Missouri | Private | Baccalaureate college | 38 | |
| Montana State University | School of Film and Photography | Bozeman | Montana | Public | Master's university | 103 | 1960 |
| University of Nebraska–Lincoln | Film & New Media, Johnny Carson School of Theatre & Film | Lincoln | Nebraska | Public | Doctorate Granting University | Unknown | 1999 |
| Santa Fe University of Art and Design | The Film School | Santa Fe | New Mexico | Private (for-profit) | Baccalaureate college | 36 | |
| Buffalo State University | Television and Film Arts | Buffalo | New York | Public | | | |
| City University of New York colleges with film programs: Brooklyn College; City College of New York; College of Staten Island; Hunter College; Kingsborough Community College | Film Programs | New York City | New York | Public | Master's university Master's university Baccalaureate college Associates colleges | 130 18; 59; 34 | varies |
| Columbia University School of the Arts | Film Division | New York City | New York | Private | Master's university | 83 | 1965 |
| Cornell University | Film Program | Ithaca | New York | Private | Doctorate Granting university | 9 | 1970 |
| Digital Film Academy | Digital Filmmaking Conservatory | New York City | New York | Private | Associate Degree Professional Certificate | | 2001 |
| Digital Film Academy | Digital Filmmaking Conservatory | Atlanta | Georgia | Private | Associate Degree Professional Certificate | | 2020 |
| School of Visual Arts | Film (concentrations in Directing, Screenwriting, Cinematography, Editing) | New York | New York | Private (for-profit) | Baccalaureate college | Unknown | 1947 |
| Fort Hays State University | Informatics | Hays | Kansas | Public | Master's university | | |
| Ithaca College | Department of Cinema, Photography, and Media Arts | Ithaca | New York | Private | Master's university | 90 | 1980 |
| Long Island University | Department of Theatre, Film, Dance and Arts Management | Brookville | New York | Private | Doctorate Granting university | | |
| New York Film Academy | New York Film Academy | New York | New York | Private | Master's university Baccalaureate college Associates colleges | | 1992 |
| Rochester Institute of Technology | School of Film and Animation | Rochester | New York | Private (non-profit) | Master's colleges and universities (Master's L) | 56 | 1981 |
| Blue Ridge Community College | Film and Video Production | Flat Rock | North Carolina | Public | Associates colleges | 7 | 2009 |
| Piedmont Community College | Film School | Yanceyville | North Carolina | Public | Associates colleges | 24 | 1994 |
| University of North Carolina at Greensboro | Department of Media Studies | Greensboro | North Carolina | Public | Doctorate Granting University | 79 | 1977 |
| University of North Carolina Wilmington | Department of Film Studies | Wilmington | North Carolina | Public | Doctorate Granting University | 94 | 2000 |
| Western Carolina University | School of Stage & Screen/Film & Television Program | Cullowhee | North Carolina | Public | Bachelor of Fine Arts | 125 | 2007 |
| Ohio University | Ohio University Film | Athens | Ohio | Public | Doctorate Granting University | Unknown | Unknown |
| Oklahoma City University | Moving Image Arts | Oklahoma City | Oklahoma | Private | Master's university | | |
| George Fox University | Cinema & Media Communication | Newberg | Oregon | Private | Master's university | 16 | 2000 |
| Portland State University | School of Theater + Film | Portland | Oregon | Public | Doctorate Granting University | Approx. 300 | 2007 |
| Temple University | Film and Media Arts | Philadelphia | Pennsylvania | Public | | | 2012 |
| Point Park University | Cinema Arts | Pittsburgh | Pennsylvania | Private | Bachelor of Fine Arts, Bachelor of Arts | | |
| The Arts Institutes | Digital Film | Nashville | Tennessee | Private-for-profit | Unknown | Unknown | Unknown |
| University of North Texas | Radio, TV, Film & Performing Arts Building | Denton | Texas | Public | Master's university Baccalaureate college Associates colleges Doctorate Granting University | | |
| University of Texas | University of Texas at Austin College of Communication/University of Texas at Austin Department of Radio-Television-Film | Austin | Texas | Public | Master's university Baccalaureate college Associates colleges Doctorate Granting University | | 1965 |
| University of Utah | University of Utah Department of Film & Media Arts | Salt Lake City | Utah | Public | Master's of Fine Arts; Baccalaureate college | 8 | Unknown |
| Old Dominion University | Old Dominion University | Norfolk | Virginia | Public | Baccalaureate college | Unknown | Unknown |
| Virginia Commonwealth University | VCUarts Cinema | Richmond | Virginia | Public | Baccalaureate college | Unknown | Unknown |
| TheFilmSchool | TheFilmSchool | Seattle | Washington (state) | Private | Special Focus Institutions | Unknown | 2004 |
| Central Washington University | CWU Film Department, College of Arts and Humanities | Ellensburg | Washington (State) | Public | Bachelor of Arts | unknown | unknown |
| University of California, Irvine | Department of Film and Media Studies | Irvine | California | Public | Unknown | Unknown | Unknown |
| New York University | Tisch School of the Arts | New York City | New York | Private | Bachelor of Fine Arts; Bachelor of Arts; Master of Fine Arts; Master of Arts; Master of Professional Studies; Doctor of Philosophy | unknown | 1965 |
| Rutgers University | Mason Gross School of the Arts | New Brunswick | New Jersey | Public | Bachelor of Fine Arts | unknown | |

== See also ==
- Film school
- List of film schools
- Wikiversity Courses in Filmmaking
- Ghetto Film School
