= K. R. Narayanan National Institute of Visual Science and Arts =

Film school in Kottayam, Kerala, India

Coordinates: 09°37′26.2″N 76°41′28.9″E

K. R. Narayanan National Institute of Visual Science and Arts (KRNNIVSA)
- കെ ആർ നാരായണൻ നാണഷൽ ഇൻസ്റ്റിറ്റ്യൂട്ട് ഓഫ് വിശ്വൽ സയൻസ് ആൻഡ് ആർട്സ്
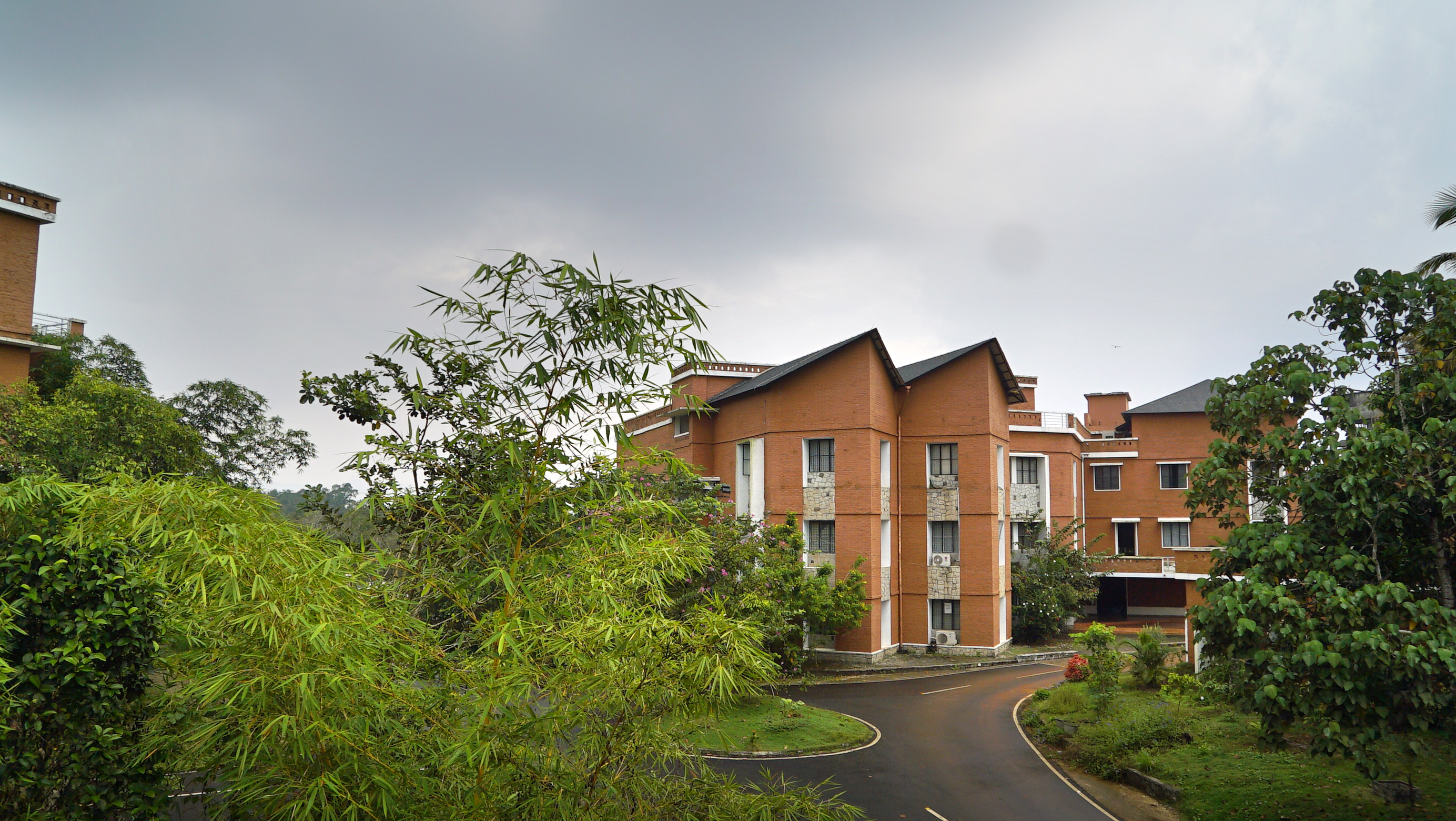
- Type: National Film Institute
- Established: 2014
- Affiliations: CILECT
- Chairman: Joshy Mathew
- Director: Ajith Abraham George
- Location: Thekkumthala, Kottayam, Kerala, India
- Campus: spread over 12 acres (0.049 km^{2}) in Kottayam Dist
- Website: https://www.krnnivsa.edu.in/

K. R. Narayanan National Institute of Visual Science and Arts (KRNNIVSA) is an autonomous institute established by the Government of Kerala at Thekkumthala, Chengalam East Village in Kottayam District of Kerala state as a training-cum-research centre in film/audio-visual technology. The institute, named after K. R. Narayanan who was the President of India during 1997 - 2002, was inaugurated by Hamid Ansari, Vice President of India, on 11 January 2016. The Institute is managed by a Governing Council which has Chief Minister of Kerala as Chairman and Minister for Education, Kerala State, as Co-Chairman and twelve members. There is also an Academic Council consisting of people for the film and television industry.

== Courses ==
The institute offers Three-year full-time Post Graduate Diploma programmes in;

- Direction and Screenplay Writing
- Cinematography
- Editing
- Audiography
- Animation and Visual Effects
- Acting

== Facilities ==
- Shooting Floor
- Library
- Classroom Theatres
- The Boys & Girls Hostels
- Colour Correction Suite
- 4K Preview Theatre cum Surround Sound Mixing Room.
- A 6,255 sq. ft. purpose-buiPrevious Directorslt facility with a wooden floor serves as the acting studio floor.

== Previous Directors ==
Name	Office Tenure
Jijoy Rajagopal	2023-2025
Sunny Joseph ISC	2025-2026

=== See also ===
- Cinema of India
- Film and Television Institute of India
- Satyajit Ray Film and Television Institute
- State Institute of Film and Television
- Government Film and Television Institute
- M.G.R. Government Film and Television Training Institute
- Jyoti Chitraban Film and Television Institute
- Biju Patnaik Film and Television Institute of Odisha
- Film School
- List of film schools
