= Biju Pattanaik Film and Television Institute of Odisha =

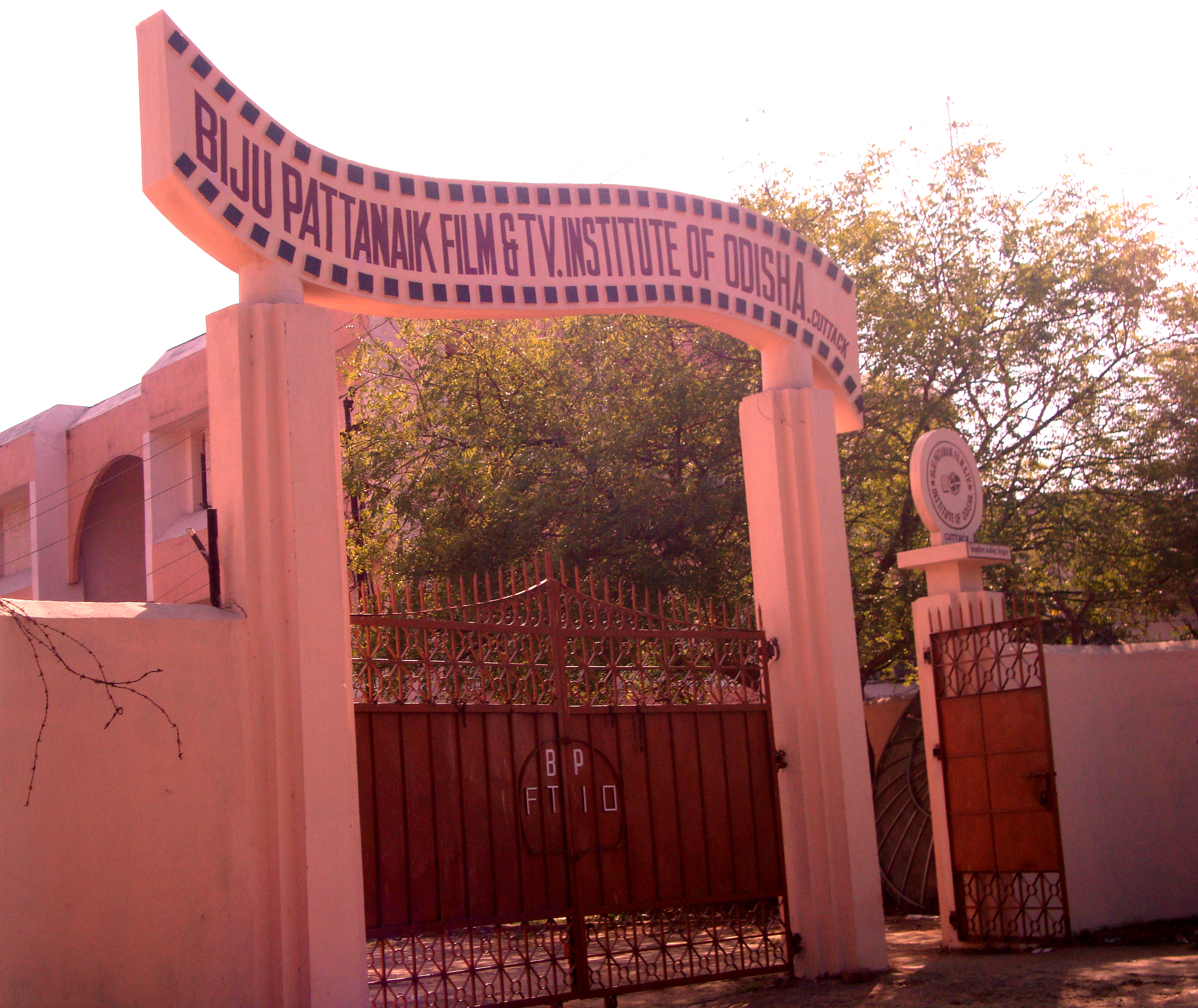
- Main building of Biju Pattanaik Film and Television Institute of Odisha
- Type: Film school
- Established: 1998
- Affiliations: State Council for Technical Education & Vocational Training
- Location: Cuttack, Odisha, India
- Campus: Bhubanananda Orissa School of Engineering, Cuttack
- Website: http://www.bpftio.org.in

The Biju Pattanaik Film and Television Institute of Odisha, Cuttack (BPFTIO) is an autonomous college established by the Government of Odisha under World Bank assisted scheme to meet the emerging demand of well trained technical manpower in the field of television network and film production activities. Situated on the bank of river Mahanadi, BPFTIO occupies an independent space in the sprawling campus of Bhubanananda Orissa School of Engineering (BOSE), Cuttack the oldest Engineering School of the State. Funded by Government of Odisha, Department of Employment and Technical Education & Training, the institute offers diploma courses in 3 disciplines such as Cinematography, Sound & TV. Engineering and Film & Video Editing.

== History ==
The institute was established in 1998. Government of Odisha has established an autonomous Institute in the name and style of Biju Pattanaik Film & Television Institute of Orissa (BPFTIO) under World Bank assisted scheme to meet the emerging demand of well trained technical manpower in the field of television network and film production activities. Situated on the bank of river Mahanadi, BPFTIO occupies an independent space in the sprawling campus of Bhubanananda Orissa School of Engineering (BOSE), Cuttack the oldest Engineering School of the State. Funded by Government of Odisha, Department of Employment and Technical Education & Training, the institute offers diploma courses in 3 disciplines such as Cinematography, Sound & TV. Engineering and Film & Video Editing.

BPFTIO has some of the most advanced and sophisticated equipments in the Eastern Region and all the three disciplines are managed by experienced faculties. Fourteen batches of students in Cinematography, Eleven batches both in Sound & TV. Engineering and Film & Video Editing have successfully completed their course till date. Almost all the diploma holders of the institute have found gainful employment in Government and Private sector, Media channels, Television & Film industry.

== Courses ==
- Three-year diploma courses in Cinematography
- Sound and TV. Engineering (Audiography)
- Film and Video Editing

== See also ==
- Film and Television Institute of India
- Bhartendu Natya Academy
- Cinema of India
- Film and Television Institute of India alumni
- Film school
- State Institute of Film and Television
- Satyajit Ray Film and Television Institute
- Government Film and Television Institute
- M.G.R. Government Film and Television Training Institute
- Jyoti Chitraban Film and Television Institute
