= Lisa Wray =

American artist

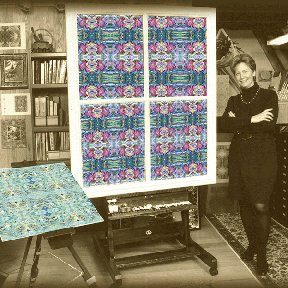
- Lisa Wray standing next to "Brew of Life"
- Education: Hussian School of Art
- Known for: tradigital art, metaphysical art
- Notable work: creator of "Brew of Life", "Fantasy", "Jesus The Shaman", "Book of Patterns Dedicated to the American Indian", Reiki Tarot Cards

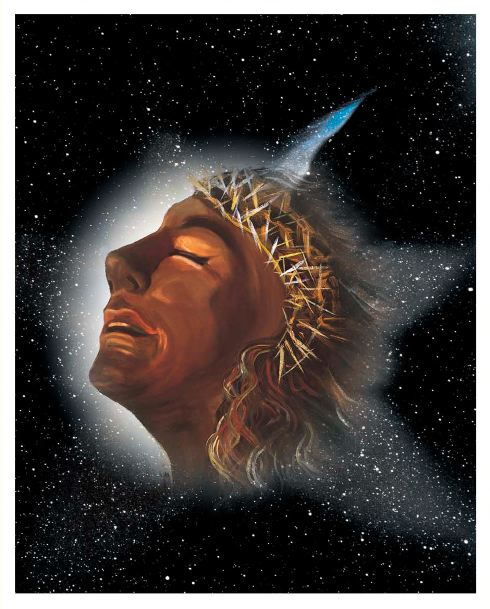
Jesus the Shaman (1973) Oil Painting

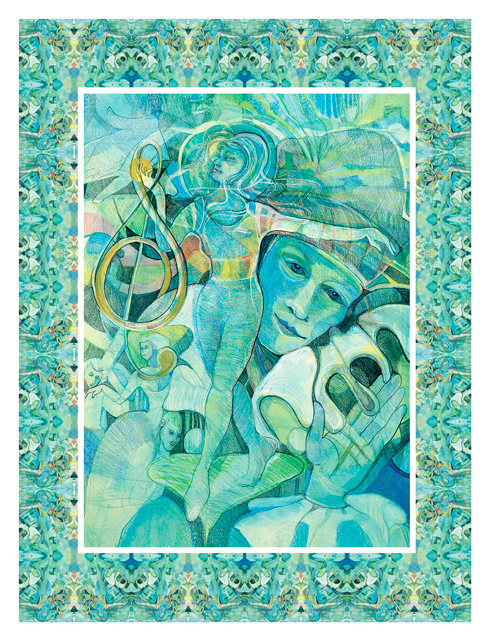
Fantasy (1979) Mixed Media Drawing

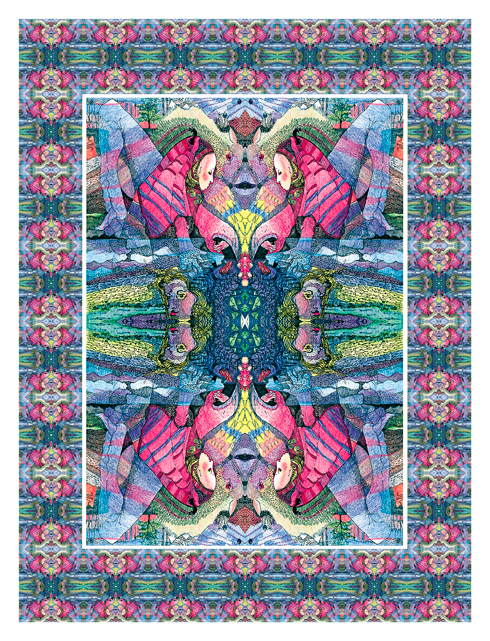
Brew of Life (1983) Mixed Media Drawing

Lisa Wray is a Pennsylvania-based artist, and one of the early pioneers of visual graphic media arts. Her works can be viewed as tradigital art and metaphysical art. Wray graduated from the Hussian School of Art, Philadelphia in 1979, where she studied commercial and fine art. She was a freelance artist in the late 1980s, and owned a print shop. Wray created some of the artwork in a series called the "Renaissance of Metaphysical Imagery" as early as 1978. In 1983, she started creating prototypes of the original works—from color copies, color photos or film negatives made in her graphic arts darkroom—in an attempt to produce metaphysical art, but discovered that the mechanical methods available could not achieve the accuracy of computer systems. "In 1983, when the first prototypes were made, the hardware did not exist to output high resolution in a hard copy form", she remembers.

In 1990 she visited the only two places in the country with proprietary computer systems capable of assembling her prototypes: Raphael Digital Transparencies in Houston, Texas, and Dodge Color Laboratories in Washington D.C. The first two prototypes, Brew of Life and Fantasy were assembled by Dodge Color Laboratories on a Superset machine that was first developed by the Department of Defense. The final art was archived on 1" magnetic tape, and then output as an 11x14” color film transparency. In the early 1990s, Wray discovered Judith Moncrieff and her pioneering efforts with tradigital art, after which she began using "tradigital art" as a reference to her own work as well. Wray uses the term to describe a new type of fine art that combines traditional painting, drawing and photography with digital media (software and digital tools).

Wray begins her creative process with a hand-rendered image and then explores the larger patterns that emerge through combining duplicates of the original. "My art ideals are beauty, harmony, and symmetry. In my mind's eye I can see vignettes of an image repeated until it creates a new image," she explains. Once the design is decided, Wray takes her original to a color trade shop where an operator scans it at high resolution, duplicates it as necessary, and assembles the work according to her plan. Why not do the work on a desktop system? At the physical size (20x24 inches) and high resolution Wray's after, small systems bog down. "I've tried a lower-end system, but it can't handle the detail, and I could have a cup of coffee while waiting for the image to move," she says. "I use a hot-melt, color-dye transfer technology -- a new archival process -- to transfer the transparency on a stretched canvas, and then I add paints to emphasize or highlight areas of the work. I can get colors I could never get through the production process."

Wray has linked her "metaphysical imagery" to the archetypal framework of Carl Jung: "I like to think along the lines of Jung in that each work is a type of mandala; the premonition of a centre of personality, a kind of central point within the psyche, to which everything is related, by which everything is arranged, and which is itself a source of energy." Wray also likens her philosophy of art to the Greek born-Italian artist, Giorgio de Chirico, who referred to his dreamy style as "metaphysical painting." Wray says her work is based on the "beauty, harmony and symmetry of subconscious thought, but would not be possible without the computer's infinitesimal, microcosmic handling of minute details." "As a fine art designer, I love the computer's ability to achieve perfection and to handle the most minute detail. I also love the tactile feeling of working with paint, brushes and whatever! You can't beat some of the other old graphic arts engraving and etching processes."
