= Film School of the Aristotle University =

Greek film school

Coordinates: 40°37′48″N 22°57′29″E

Thessaloniki School of Film Studies
- Τμήμα Κινηματογράφου του Αριστοτελείου Πανεπιστημίου Θεσσαλονίκης
- Motto: Μούσαις Χάρισι Θῦε (Ancient Greek)
- Motto in English: Sacrifice to the Muses and Charites.
- Established: 2004
- Location: Thessaloniki, Greece
- Website: http://www.film.auth.gr/en

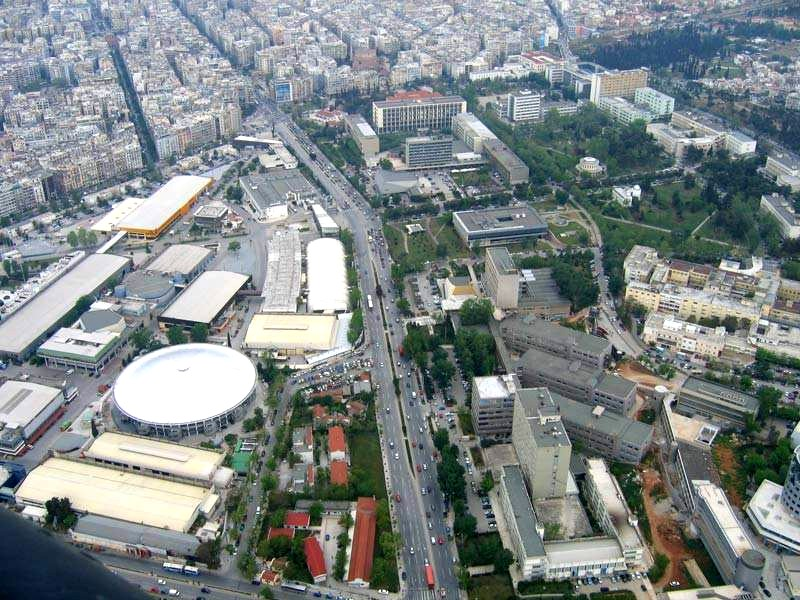
Aerial view of Central Thessaloniki. On the right the Aristotle University's campus

The Film School of the Aristotle University of Thessaloniki (AUTH) is a higher educational film school in Greece. It offers a five years 1st and 2nd circle program leading to an Integrated Master degree in Film.

== Schools directions ==
There are 8 areas in Film where students can specialize:

1. Screenwriting
2. Directing
3. Film Production
4. Cinematography
5. Editing
6. Sound
7. Art Direction
8. Film History and Theory

== Schools MA Programs ==
The Film Department has two Master programs.

1. Creative Writing and Screenwriting (Since 2018, co-organized with University of Western Macedonia).
2. Film and Television Studies (Since 2019).

== History ==
The Film department was founded by the 3255/2004 ΦΕΚ 138/Α/22.7.2004 law of the Greek State and began its operation during the academic year 2004–2005. It is one of the four departments of the Aristotle University of Thessaloniki Faculty of Fine Arts (with the three others being School of Drama, School of Music Studies and School of Visual and Applied Arts).

== Honorary doctorates ==
- Michael Cacoyannis (2005)
- Pantelis Voulgaris (2012)
- Costa-Gavras (2013)

== See also ==
- List of universities in Greece
- European Higher Education Area
- List of film schools
