= Gulf Islands (disambiguation) =

The Gulf Islands are islands in the Strait of Georgia in British Columbia, Canada.

Gulf Islands may also refer to:

- Gulf Islands National Park Reserve, national park located on and around the Gulf Islands in British Columbia
- Gulf Islands National Seashore, protected regions along the Gulf of Mexico barrier islands of Florida and Mississippi
- Gulf Islands Film and Television School, a film school located on Galiano Island off the west coast of British Columbia, Canada
- Saanich—Gulf Islands, federal electoral district in British Columbia, Canada
- Persian Gulf islands
