= Prajna (singer) =

Indian music composer and filmmaker

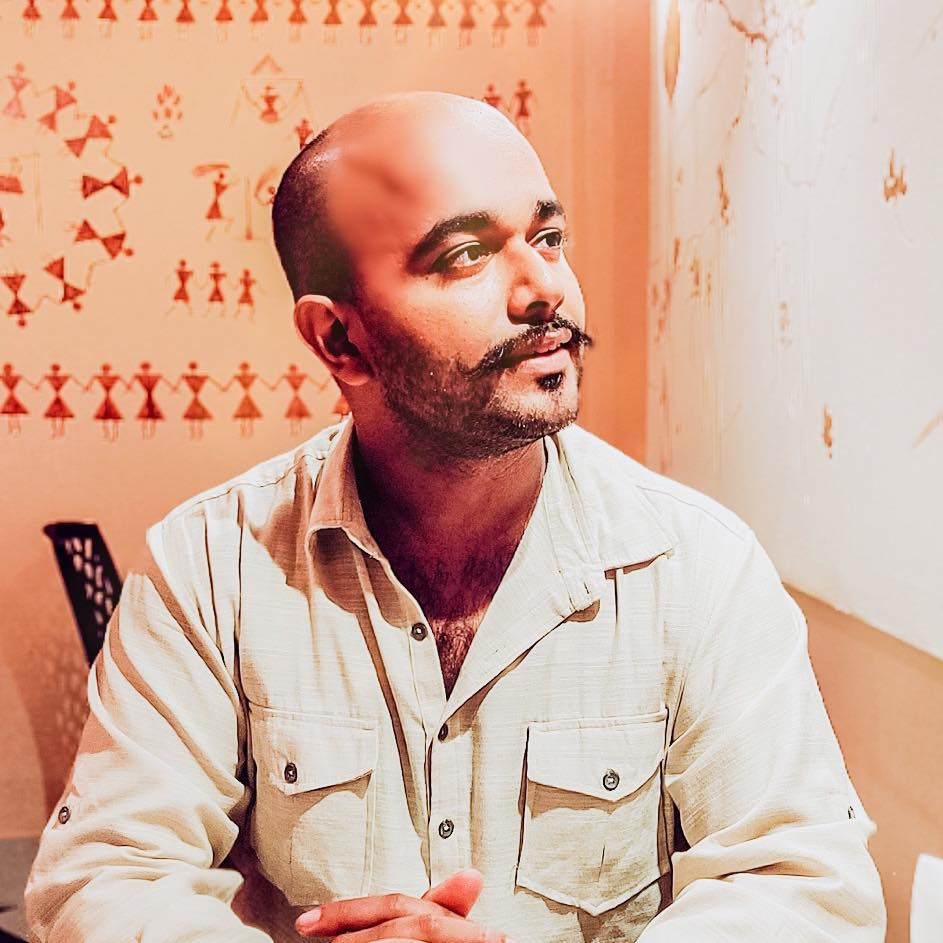

Background information
- Born: Prajna Dutta; Kolkata, West Bengal
- Genres: Indian classical music World Music
- Labels: Rooh Music; Angel Music; Asha Audio
- Website: Official Website

Prajna Dutta is an Indian music composer, film maker and a martial artist. He has sung and composed many songs like Notun Abeshe, Golap, Rupkatha, Behala Bajajn etc. He has also directed films like Seesaw, The Sound Wanderer and Baaji.

== Early life ==
Dutta studied screenplay writing and direction from Satyajit Ray Film and Television Institute, Kolkata. He has also learned Filipino martial art under the guidance of master Allan Fami.

== Career ==
Dutta is an Indian music composer, film maker and a martial artist. He has sung songs like Notun Abeshe, Golap, Rupkatha, Behala Bajan, Akash Bhora Surjo Tara. He has also directed films like Seesaw, The Sound Wanderer, Pachar, Shei Framey, Baaji.

== Filmography ==
=== Songs ===
- Natun Abeshe
- Golap
- Phire Eso Abar
- Behala Bajan
- Akash Bhora Surjo Tara
- Ja Jarey Ebar
- Ami Banglay Gaan Gai
- Love Aaj Kal Forever
- Bhalo Achi Bhalo Theko
- City Lights
- Ja Jare Ebar
- Gaanwala

=== Documentary ===
- Surer Simana

=== Films ===
- Baaji
- Seesaw
- The Sound Wanderer
- Pachar
- Shei Framey
- Nandigramer Chokher Pani as a music director
