= Vipin Vijay =

Indian film director and screenwriter (born 1977)

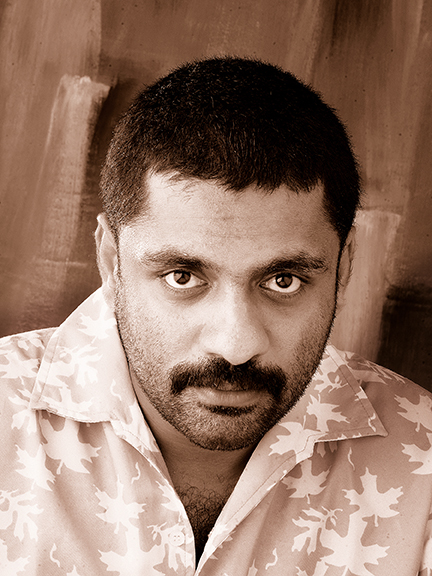
- Born: 1977 (age 48–49); Kannur, Kerala State, India
- Occupations: Film director, screenwriter

Vipin Vijay (born 1977) is an Indian film director and screenwriter. He received his post-graduate degree in filmmaking from the Satyajit Ray Film and Television Institute SRFTI, Calcutta. He received the Charles Wallace Arts Award for research at the British Film Institute, London, 2003. Vipin is the recipient of "The Sanskriti Award" (2007) for social & cultural achievement. His works are made under independent codes and defy any categorisation eluding all traditional genre definitions and merge experimental film, documentary, essay, fiction all into one.

== Early life ==
Vipin Vijay was born in Kannur and grew up in Calicut (Kozhikode) Kerala. His father, Dr. E. Vijayan Nair was a professor in the Department of mechanical engineering at the National Institute of Technology, Calicut. His schooling was at Kendriya Vidyalaya, Calicut (Kozhikode). Vipin graduated from St. Joseph's College, Devagiri, Calicut.

== Career in film ==
His diploma film at Satyajit Ray Film and Television Institute titled Unmathabudham Jagath (The Egotic World) was based on the text of Yoga Vasishta. The film won the Kodak International film school competition in 2002. Film critic and author Amrit Gangar has cited the film as one among the ten best experimental Indian films ever made. The film premiered at the competition section of the International Short Film Festival Oberhausen, 2001. The film was screened in festivals including Karlovy Vary International Film Festival, Montreal, Mumbai International short and Animation film festival MIFF, International Film Festival of Kerala and International Film Festival of India (IFFI).

The film premiered at the International Film Festival Rotterdam (IFFR), 2002 and was shown in film festivals at Tehran, Milan, International Film Festival of Kerala, MIFF. Kshurasyadhara won the best Malayalam film commendation award 2001, Indian Documentary Producer's Association (IDPA), Best Director Award of the Kerala State Film & TV Awards 2001, and the National Jury award of the Mumbai International short and Animation film festival (MIFF) in 2002. Kshurasyadhara is now a part of permanent archives at the United States Library of Congress.

Hawamahal (Palace of the Winds, 2003) was produced by the Public Service Broadcasting Trust (PSBT). Hawamahal was showcased in International Film Festival Rotterdam, New York, Karachi, Beverly Chicago Arts Center, Ullens Center for Contemporary Art, Beijing, Berkeley Art Museum and Pacific Film Archive and is archived at the US Library of Congress. The film won the best film, John Abraham (Director) National Award.

Video Game (2006), produced by Public Service Broadcasting Trust (PSBT), premiered at the Tiger awards competition for short films. Video Game is the first Indian film to win a short Tiger Award", 2007.

The citation of the jury says that “Video Game is yet another illustration that there's more to the cinema of India than can be contained with the received wisdom which seeks to encompass it by reference to a dualism opposing Satyajit Ray to Bollywood. Video Game shows a relentless, complex post-modern intelligence as it processes everything within its view, within its memory, within its wide range of cultural references. Its title is an index to this complexity, as it evokes not only digital game space as an aspect of the real, but the pursuit of video within the understanding of a game, replete with strategies, movements, and countermovements. A new kind of road, indeed.”

The film also won the best film, Golden Pearl Award, Hyderabad International Film Festival, India 2007 and the John Abraham National Award 2006. The film was shown at International Documentary Film Festival Zagreb, Croatia, Centre Georges Pompidou and International Short Film Festival Oberhausen (2007)

The documentary Poomaram (A Flowering Tree, 2007) based on the feminist author Judy Grahn's work Blood Bread and Roses premiered at International Film Festival Rotterdam, 2008. Poomaram was part of the Indian panorama 2007 IFFI Goa. The film won the national film award 2007 in the non-feature category. In 2007, Vipin was invited by the Kerala State Chalachitra Academy to make the signature film for the International Film Festival of Kerala. The one-minute film named Broken Glass, Torn Film created a huge debate amongst the cineaste at the time of the film festival.

In 2009, he made a seven-minute silent film titled A Perfumed Garden which was part of the Indian-Highway project premiered at Serpentine Galleries, London. Indian Highway showcased a snapshot of a generation of contemporary artists working across a range of media in India. The exhibition has since become hugely successful and traveled all over the world.

In 2010, Vipin scripted and directed the fiction feature film Chitrasutram (The Image Threads) which was in competition for the prestigious Tiger Awards at the International Film Festival Rotterdam. The film produced by Unknown Films was supported by the Hubert Bals film fund, the global film initiative and the Goteborg film fund. The screenplay of the film was selected at the Festival des 3 Continents, Nantes, Paris. Chitrasutram featured in various festivals around the world including Goteborg, Vladivostok, Copenhagen, Kerala, São Paulo, SAIFF, New York, Summer Institute in Film at York University. The film won four Kerala state film awards and one national film awards. It won the Hassankutty award for the best debut film at IFFK, Kerala, apart from the Padmarajan Puraskaram for best film and screenplay, and a special mention, John Abraham national awards.

He made a documentary Vishaparvam or Venomous Folds 2012 for PSBT, New Delhi. The film had its world premiere in the international competition section at the International Short Film Festival Oberhausen international film festival 2013 and since has been shown in the Indian panorama at IFFI, Goa 2013, Signes de Nuit, Paris, International Film Festival Rotterdam, 2014. It won the main award in the below 45 minutes category at the Festival Signes de Nuit, Paris, France.

In 2012, Vipin traveled throughout south India making a four-hour long documentary film, tracing the advent of Jaina heritage in south India, supported by a project initiated by the Bharatvarshiya Digambar Jain Tirthkshetra Committee, Mumbai.

In 2014 he completed a documentary film, Feet Upon the Ground, on the creative world of Shri Adoor Gopalakrishnan, for the Indira Gandhi National Centre for the Arts, New Delhi as part of their "Great Masters" series.

61st International Short Film Festival Oberhausen 2015, Germany honoured him with a profile, showcasing his body of works.

International Documentary and Short Film Festival of Kerala (IDSFFK) 2016 showed his works in the "Filmmaker in Focus" section.

His fiction feature film titled Prathibhasam (Malayalam) was completed in 2018.

Vipin is developing a fiction film set in Kerala tracing the roots of the ethnic and cultural memory of a community set in Cochin, Kerala. The film titled Chavunilam (A Voice from Elsewhere) won the Incredible India award for the Most Promising Project of the Co-production market, 2012 at the Film bazaar, International Film Festival of India, Goa, 2012.

== Sexual harassment allegations ==
In 2024, when Vijay was dean at SRFTI, complaints were made that he had sexually harassed a student and two staff at the institute. The institute upheld the complaints and sacked him as dean, banning him from the campus. Vijay challenged the process in the High Court of Calcutta, which declined to interfere with the complaint process, but asked that Vijay be allowed to cross-examine witnesses. They also instructed the Institute to refrain from coercive measures against Vijay. He was then reinstated as dean in September 2025, and removed from post again a few days later following student protests.

== Filmography ==
| Name of film | Year | Length |
|---|---|---|
| The Egotic World | 2000 | 32 mins |
| The Razor's Edge | 2001 | 30 mins |
| Palace of the Winds | 2004 | 60 mins |
| Video Game | 2006 | 30 mins |
| A Flowering Tree | 2007 | 60 mins |
| Broken Glass, Torn Film | 2007 | 1 min |
| A Perfumed Garden | 2007 | 7 mins |
| The Image Threads | 2010 | 104 mins |
| Venomous Folds | 2012 | 30 mins |
| Feet Upon the Ground | 2014 | 175 mins |
| Prathibhasam | 2018 | 150 mins |
| Tumbling Dice | 2018 | 57 mins |
| A Voice from Elsewhere | Pre-production | |
