= State Institute of Urban Planning and Architecture =

Architecture school in Rohtak, India

State Institute Of Urban Planning and Architecture
- Type: Government
- Established: 2011
- Affiliations: State University Of Performing and Visual Arts .
- Location: Rohtak, Haryana, India
- Campus: Urban

State Institute of Urban Planning and Architecture has been established in the year 2012 to provide quality education in the field of Architecture and Urban Planning. It is located in Rohtak, Haryana and is under the direct supervision of GTIS.

== The Campus ==
The campus comprises four institutes namely State Institute of Design (SID), State Institute of Film and Television (SIFTV), State Institute of Fine Arts (SIFA) and State Institute of Urban Planning and Architecture (SIUPA). These institutes are modelled on the lines of respective apex institutes of national importance. The Campus is being established at a capital expenditure of Rs. 300 crore by the Government of Haryana through Government Technical Institution Society, Rohtak. Each of the four individual institutes is provided with separate institute building and common central facilities including an auditorium, art gallery, knowledge centre and a cafeteria. The campus is designed by internationally renowned architect Raj Rewal and M/s RITES (A Government of India Enterprise) is the project management consultant.

== Admission process ==
10+2 examination passed or appearing under recognised Central/State Board of Secondary Education/Council for Indian School of Certificate Examination, New Delhi with English & Math as compulsory subjects. As per COA norms, the minimum 10+2 aggregate percentage should be 50% or more. Or 3 years diploma recognised by AICTE or State Board of Technical Education (minimum 50% marks) with valid NATA score.

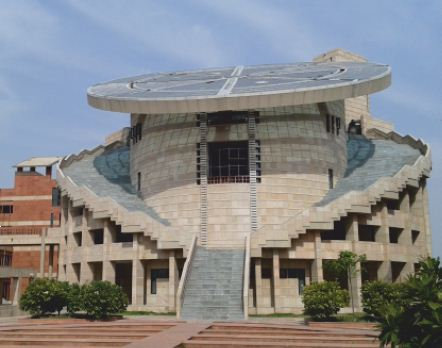
State of the art building

== Study tour ==
Study tour of SIUPA students to Ahmedabad was conducted in the year 2012. The Students during the tour visited Sabarmati Ashram, Hussain Doshi Gufa, Bhadra Fort, Teen Darwaza, Akshardham Temple, Hathee Singh Temple, Jama Masjid, Indian Institute of Management and National Institute of Design. Study tour of SIUPA students to Chandigarh was conducted in the year 2013 to enlighten them with Architectural and Planning aspects of the India's first planned city.

== See also ==
- State Institute of Film and Television
