= Satyajit Ray Film and Television Institute =

Film school in Kolkata, India

- Other name: SRFTI
- Type: Film school Deemed university
- Established: 1995; 31 years ago
- Affiliations: CILECT
- Chancellor: Union Minister of Information and Broadcasting
- Vice-Chancellor: Samiran Datta
- President: Suresh Gopi
- Location: Kolkata, West Bengal, India; 22.4848°N 88.3953°E
- Campus: Urban 40 acre
- Website: srfti.ac.in

Satyajit Ray Film and Television Institute (SRFTI) is a film and television institute located in Kolkata, West Bengal, India. Named after Indian filmmaker Satyajit Ray, the Institute provides higher and professional education and technical expertise in the art and technique of film-making and television production. Established in 1995, the Institute is an autonomous society funded by the Ministry of Information and Broadcasting, Government of India.

== History ==
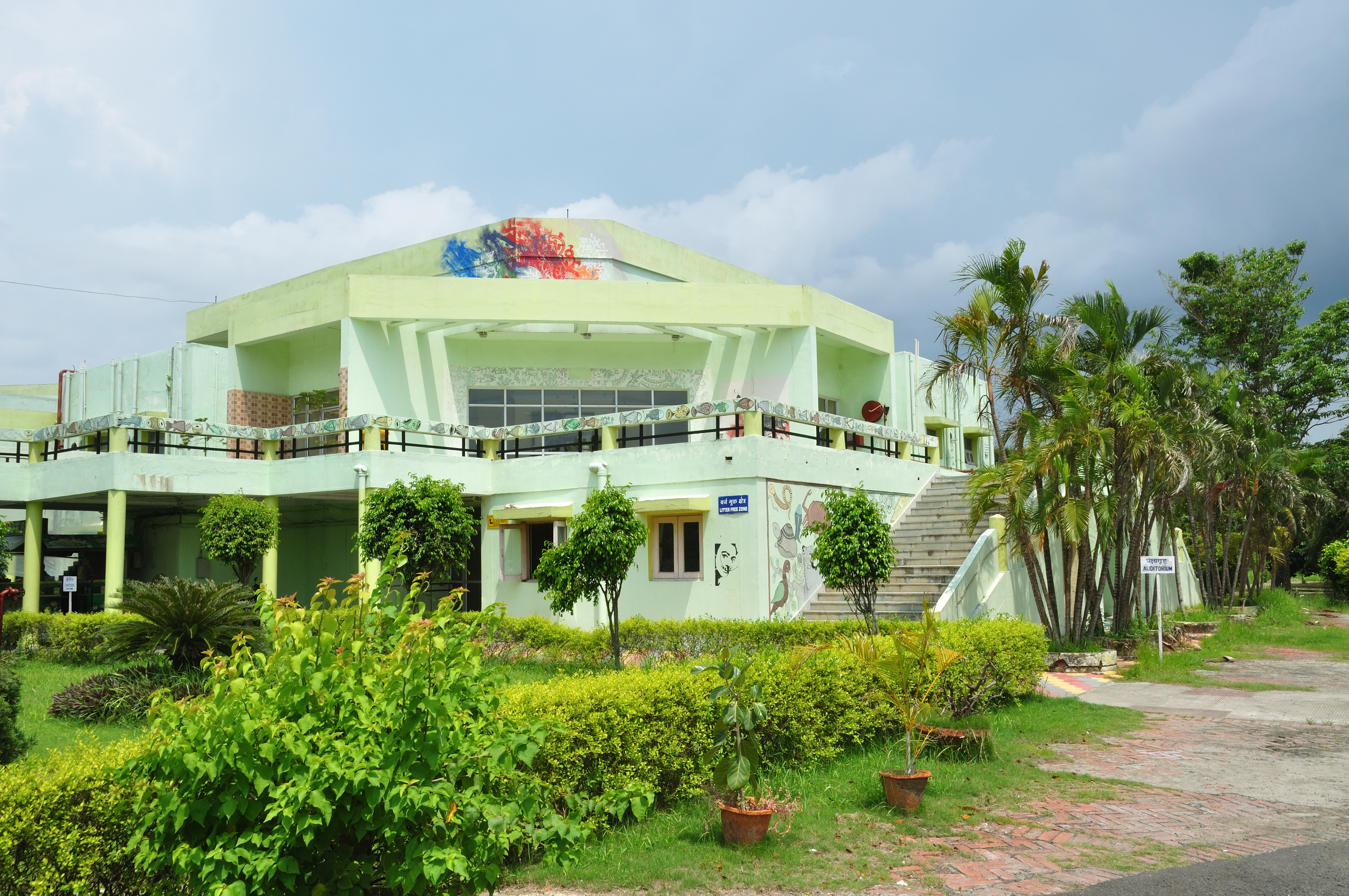
Satyajit Ray Film and Television Institute

The SRFTI was established in 1995, and registered as a society on 18 August 1995 under the West Bengal Societies Registration Act, 1961. It is an autonomous society funded by the Ministry of Information and Broadcasting, Government of India. It was named after Indian film director Satyajit Ray. The first session began on 1 September 1996, while Dr. Debasish Majumdar joined as the institute's first director in 1997. On 2 September 2024, upon UGC recommendation, the Institute had received a letter of intent from the Ministry of Education to fulfil the requirements to receive University status.

== Allegations of sexual assault and harassment ==
In 2015, several female students claimed they were sexually harassed at the Institute. Three teaching staff were suspended as a result. One student claimed she had been raped.

In 2023, students protested sexual harassment at the Institute.

In 2024, complaints were made that Dean Vipin Vijay had sexually harassed a student and two staff at the Institute. The Institute upheld the complaints and removed Vijay from his position, banning him from the campus. Vijay challenged the process in the High Court of Calcutta, but the court refused to be involved. He was then reinstated as Dean in September 2025, and removed from his position again a few days later following student protests.

== Notable faculty ==
- Subrata Mitra
- Adoor Gopalakrishnan
- Shakti Samanta
- Ashoke Viswanathan

== Notable alumni ==
=== Direction & Screenplay Writing ===
- Vipin Vijay (Chitrasutram)
- Amal Neerad (Big B, Iyobinte Pusthakam, Bheeshma Parvam)
- Sagar Ballary (Bheja Fry, Hum Tum Shabana)
- Haobam Paban Kumar (AFSPA 1958 - Best Non-Feature Film at 56th National Film Awards, Mr. India - Best Film on Social Issues at 57th National Film Awards)
- Kanu Behl (Oye Lucky! Lucky Oye!, Love Sex Aur Dhokha, Titli )
- Christo Tomy (Ullozhukku)
- Avijit Sen
- Dominic Sangma

=== Cinematography ===
- Modhura Palit
- Sivakumar Vijayan (Vidiyum Munn, Saala Khadoos)
- Siddharth Diwan (Titli, Bulbbul, Jayeshbhai Jordaar)
- Shehnad Jalal (Chitra Sutram, Bramayugam)
- Appu Prabhakar

=== Editing ===
- Namrata Rao (Ishqiya, Band Baaja Baaraat, Kahaani, 2 States, Fan)
- Manas Mittal
- Sanglap Bhowmik
- Atanu Mukherjee

== See also ==
- Cinema of India
- Bhartendu Natya Academy
- Film and Television Institute of India
- State Institute of Film and Television
- Government Film and Television Institute
- K. R. Narayanan National Institute of Visual Science and Arts
- M.G.R. Government Film and Television Training Institute
- Jyoti Chitraban Film and Television Institute
