= M.G.R. Government Film and Television Training Institute =

Pioneer film institute in India

M. G. R. Government Film and Television Training Institute
- Type: Film school
- Established: 1945; 81 years ago (as Adyar Film Institute)
- Academic affiliations: The Tamil Nadu Dr. J. Jayalalithaa Music and Fine Arts University
- Chairman: Manoj Paramahamsau
- Principal: A. V. Surendhiran (FAC)
- Location: C.I.T. Campus, Tharamani, Chennai – 600113, Tamil Nadu, India
- Campus: Urban
- Website: https://www.filminstitute.tn.gov.in/en

The M.G.R. Government Film and Television Training Institute, popularly known earlier as Madras Film Institute, is Asia's first-ever film and television training institute. Established in 1945 as Adyar Film Institute, it is one of the pioneer film institutes in India. It is in Tharamani, Chennai, and is run by the Department of Information and Public Relations, Government of Tamil Nadu.

The diplomas are approved by All India Council for Technical Education (AICTE), while the certificates are awarded by the Department of Technical Education, Government of Tamil Nadu.

The president of the Institute was Trotsky Marudu, who was appointed by the Government on 11 November 2024.

== History ==
The institute was established in 1945 as Adyar Film Institute and was a part of the Central Polytechnic. In 1965, it moved into its present campus in the Tharamani area of Chennai. At the time, the campus was spread over 54 acres, which has reduced over the following decades, due to rapid urbanisation. Parts of land were given to the IIT Madras and many IT companies, bringing it down to the present 10 acres.

M.G.R. Film City is situated in Taramani. It is an Indian Film and TV Training Institute run by Tamil Nadu State Government under Information and Public relation.

In 2006, it was renamed M.G.R. Film and Television Training Institute, after former Chief Minister of Tamil Nadu M. G. Ramachandran (1917–1987), who was a prominent actor in Tamil cinema.

In 1994, the government started MGR Film City to make more filmmaking facilities in the city. On 16 October 1997, Queen Elizabeth II visited MGR Film City and watched the filming of Kamal Haasan's Tamil movie Marudhanayagam. The acting course that started in 1971, at the behest of M.G.R., was discontinued in 2002. Talks to revive the course have been on for many years.

== Courses ==
It offers four-year bachelor's degree courses

1. Bachelor of Visual Arts (Cinematography)
2. Bachelor of Visual Arts (Digital Intermediate)
3. Bachelor of Visual Arts (Audiography)
4. Bachelor of Visual Arts (Direction and Screenplay Writing)
5. Bachelor of Visual Arts (Film Editing)
6. Bachelor of Visual Arts (Animation and Visual Effects)

Screenplay and Direction, Cinematography, Sound Recording and Sound Engineering, Film Editing and Film Processing, and functions of the government. Only 14 students are admitted in each course.

== Notable alumni ==
Artist	Category	Notes
K. S. Prasad	Cinematographer	
Mankada Ravi Varma	Cinematographer	
Ashok Kumar	Cinematographer	
P. S. Nivas	Cinematographer	
Keyaar	Film director	
Aabavanan	Film director	
RV.Udayakumar	Film director	
Rajinikanth	Actor	
Hema Chaudhary	Actress	
G. V. Narayana Rao	Actor	
Mohan Babu	Actor	
K. Natraj	Actor	
Ramki	Actor	
C. Rudhraiya	Screenwriter, Film director	
K. Rajeshwar	Screenwriter, Film director	
Jose	Actor	
Maniyanpilla Raju	Actor	
Rajendra Prasad	Actor	
Sujatha Vijaykumar	Producer	
Chakrapani	Actor	
Sudhakar	Actor	
Chiranjeevi	Actor	
Nassar	Actor	
Sreenivasan	Actor	
P. C. Sreeram	Cinematographer	
Suhasini Maniratnam	Actress	
Raghuvaran	Actor	
Archana	Actor	
Yugi Sethu	Film director	
R. V. Udayakumar	Film director	
Rajiv Menon	Cinematographer	
G. P. Krishna	Cinematographer	
Ayananka Bose	Cinematographer	
V. Manikandan	Cinematographer	
Boopathy Pandian	Director	
Sakthi Saravanan	Cinematographer	
Anand Raj	Actor	
Shiva Rajkumar	Actor	
S. Saravanan	Cinematographer	
M. V. Panneerselvam	Cinematographer	
Raveendran	Actor	
Kumar Bangarappa	Actor	
Ajayan	Cinematographer	
N. Harikumar	Sound editor	
U. K. Senthil Kumar	Cinematographer	
Jeeva	Cinematographer	
S. Saravanan	Cinematographer	
M. V. Panneerselvam	Cinematographer	
Vijay Milton	Cinematographer	
R. Rathnavelu	Cinematographer	
Saravanan	Actor	
E. Ezhilbabu	Cinematographer; Cameraman, ISRO, Ahmedabad	
Alberrt Antoni	Film director	
Vaidy S.	Cinematographer	
R. Diwakaran	Cinematographer	
P. V. Sunilkumar	Cinematographer, Vikram Sarabhai Space Centre, ISRO	
Chandru Manickavasagam	Writer, Film director	
R. T. Neason	Director	
N. K. Ekambaram	Cinematographer	
Siva	Director	
Vetri	Cinematographer	
Nandha Durairaj	Actor	
Mohan Raja	Film director	
Bommarillu Baskar	Film Director	
Azhagam Perumal	Director, Actor	
P. S. Vinod	Cinematographer	
Arivazhagan Venkatachalam	Director	
M. Anbazhagan	Director	
Narain	Cinematographer, Actor	
E. Krishnasamy	Cinematographer	
Manoj Paramahamsa	Cinematographer	
Gnanam Subramanian	Cinematographer	
Arul Sakthi Jayam	Underwater DOP/ Cinematographer	
Mahesh Narayanan	Film editor, Screenplay writer	
Manush Nandan	Cinematographer	
K. G. Venkatesh	Cinematographer	
Sooraj Nallusamy	Cinematographer	
Magesh Raj	Cinematographer	
E.Subamohan	Cameraman, Tamilnadu Films Division.	
Sampath Alwar	Sound Engineer, Sound Designer	
Vishnu Govind	sound engineer, sound designer	
Vijay Ulaganath	Cinematographer	
Dinesh Krishnan	Cinematographer	
Sujith Sarang	Cinematographer	
Anbusathiyan R.	Cinematographer	
Richard Prasad	Cinematographer	
Srihari	Actor	
Bakkiyaraj Kannan	Director	
Gopi Krishna	Editor	
J. Dharmendra	Television Presenter, Actor	
Thirukkumaran Ganesan	Screenplay Writer, Director	
Kavin Raj	Cinematographer	
Suriya Pradhaman	Editor	
Sistla VMK	Cinematographer	
Prasanna venkatesh D		
Cinematographer		
Adam Ayub	Actor	
Ganesh K Babu	Director	

== See also ==
- Film and Television Institute of India
- Bhartendu Natya Academy
- Cinema of India
- Film and Television Institute of India alumni
- Film school
- Satyajit Ray Film and Television Institute
- Government Film and Television Institute
- State Institute of Film and Television
- Jyoti Chitraban Film and Television Institute
- Biju Pattnaik Film and Television Institute of Odisha
- K. R. Narayanan National Institute of Visual Science and Arts
