= École Internationale de Création Audiovisuelle et de Réalisation =

Coordinates: 48°54′13″N 2°21′49″E

The International Film School of Paris (French: École internationale de Création audiovisuelle et de Réalisation, EICAR) is a private film school founded in 1972 by Jean-Paul Vuillin, producer and director of film. Acquired by the YNOV Campus group in 2015, it has been based in Ivry-sur-Seine and Villeurbanne since 2021.

== History ==
=== 1972–1994: from the Actorat to EICAR ===
In 1972, Jean-Paul Vuillin, a film director and head of cinema at the Franco-Nigerien Cultural Centre in Niamey, set up a film industry training centre there, based on an idea shared with Jean Rouch, which he ran himself.

Two years later, back in Paris, he founded the Actorat du cinéma at the American Center in Paris. It focused mainly on training actors aiming for a film career, and taught the differences between working methods in film and in theatre. He also created other film departments: screenwriting, directing and production, as well as a section for video journalists.

Actress Alice Sapritch taught the students every week.

=== 1995–2005: EICAR in Paris ===
In 1995, Jean-Paul Vuillin founded the EICAR Group.

=== 2000: International students ===
In 2000 the school opened an English speaking department where all film courses were offered in English.

=== 2003–2006: EICAR Cherbourg ===
In 2002, after learning of Jean-Paul Vuillin’s project in Fontainebleau, Jean-François Le Grand, president of the general council of the Manche department, suggested he set up his school in Cherbourg-Octeville. In November 2003, Jean-Paul Vuillin created EICAR Cherbourg, which rented part of the former René-Le-Bas military hospital. The site had been converted into the International Centre for Artistic and Technical Image and Sound Professions (CIMATIS), designed around the school.

Four audiovisual BTS programmes (image, sound, editing and production) moved there. With its Paris and Normandy sites, EICAR then became the first private European audiovisual campus, with 40,000 m² of teaching space. David Amsalem served as head of the school for two years (2003–2005), and Rémy Janville succeeded him in October 2005. From the first year, BTS students faced exercises in their national exam on equipment EICAR had never trained them to use, which raised questions about the quality of the school’s teaching. At the time, Léonard Lièvre, a journalist at La Manche libre, wrote that EICAR was not recognised by the industry because it did not meet the criteria of the International Association of Film and Television Schools (CILECT).

After financial difficulties and receivership in July 2006, the Cherbourg school closed and was placed in compulsory liquidation in September 2006 by the Cherbourg-Octeville commercial court, with liabilities estimated at €1.5 million.

=== 2005: move to La Plaine-Saint-Denis and internationalisation ===
In 2005, EICAR Paris moved to the Icade-EMGP business park in La Plaine-Saint-Denis. Lionel Haidant was appointed head of the Sound Department, a position he held until 2007.

In 2008, students from 56 different countries were enrolled in the English speaking department.

In 2013, EICAR had 820 students from 60 different countries, not only in film-related fields.

EICAR joined the YNOV Campus education group in 2014.

In autumn 2021, EICAR moved to new campuses in Ivry-sur-Seine and Villeurbanne.

Frédéric Sitterlé, an entrepreneur in tech, media and audiovisual, became head of EICAR in 2023.

=== Cannes Programme ===
EICAR arranges for 30 of its students to become reporters for a week at the Cannes Film Festival, allocating places on a competitive basis.

== Location ==
EICAR Group runs a large international campus in Paris (Ivry-sur-Seine) and one in Lyon (Villeurbanne).
