= Judith Moncrieff =

Judith Jean Moncrieff (1941–2001), born in San Francisco, California, was a digital artist and a founding member of the innovative group, Unique Editions, five internationally known artists who speak to issues, processes, corporate involvement in the arts, hardware and software issues and how substrate companies may best work with digital artists and corporations dealing with this subject. They give workshops, lectures and presentations in galleries, museums, colleges and universities around the world. They presented their work and had the artwork accessed by the National Museum of American Art/Smithsonian. Moncrieff has received a medal from the Smithsonian Institution for this work in the innovation of art and technology, and her work is still currently held by the Smithsonian. She has recently added networking and experimental work with various corporations in all areas of printing and technology. As part of this search for technological futurism, Moncrieff had become an active member of the International Association of Fine Art Digital Printmakers.

Moncrieff coined the term "Tradigital Art" in the early 1990s during her tenure at Tradigital Fine Art as a principal artist alongside Helen Golden. They traveled and taught to artists, curators, educators and the public and workshops were held frequently and exhibits of their work are shown internationally. Her work and ideas are widely published. She also worked at the National Gallery of Art including showing how art equipment was used.

More recently, Moncrieff created a series known as the Wyndstone Collection while in the HIX Corporation booth at the SGIA Conference in Kansas City, MO. The collection was printed by Indigo, transferred by Wyndstone Heat Transfer Papers onto cloth, and other experimental papers, and was created on the Intergraph Workstation. In May 1999, the Wyndstone Collection will be shown in a special exhibit at the Javits Convention Center in New York City. Moncrieff's work is being shown internationally and is now showing in the United Kingdom and Russia in 1998 and 1999. Her work has been exhibited in the A.I.R. Gallery in New York and the Dimock Gallery in Washington, DC, and is in the main Library at George Washington University in Washington, DC. Her work has also been chosen for the permanent print collection at the Portland Art Museum and the Lloyd Reynolds collection at the Portland Art Museum. Her design work has won awards in the Print magazine, Print National Awards and American Corporate Identity. It has also been shown in the HOW and Step-by-Step magazines.
