= MAPS Film School =

- Mitchell Park, South Australia

Information
- Type: Public school (government funded)
- Established: 1983
- Faculty: 1
- Enrolment: 25 Diploma
- Campus type: Suburban Adult
- Website: www.maps.sa.edu.au

The Media Arts Production Skills (MAPS) film school is a media production school established in 1983 by then Vermont High School principal Richie Walsh. The original program was held with 12 students with limited resources. The facilitator was Roger Manogue also known as Stretch. He and Richie worked tirelessly to build the course into a well recognised and respected program. Peter Thurmer took over from Roger in the late 80s and was the key driver who continued to shape the program for many years. Peter left after over 20 plus years service, and his and Roger's legacies are many students who have gone on to forge successful film and television careers.

It is located within Hamilton College, a public secondary school. It offers training in film production. There are currently three faculty members teaching around 25 students.

Areas of study at the school consist of cinematography, directing, producing, editing, screenwriting, production and post-production audio, photography, visual effects, film theory and digital media.

The school favours the production of short, commercially viable films over academic theory. Pedagogy centres on text creation. Assessment areas include creativity and problem-solving. Alumni graduate with show reels exhibiting their work as editors, audio artists, production managers, and camera operators. Students must complete 12 days of work experience or internship during each course.

== Facilities ==
The school consists of a dedicated building for Diploma students and the Film School proper for Advanced Diploma. The school is outfitted with non-linear video editing facilities, 4K cameras and monitors and audio engineering studios equipped with industry standard software.

== Faculty ==
The principal teachers are feature film director Ashlee Page and actress and acting coach Genevieve Mooy.

== Awards and recognition ==
52 Tuesdays produced by Bryan Mason won the Crystal Bear for Best Film at the 2014 Berlin Film Festival and the Directing Award: World Cinema Dramatic at the 2014 Sundance Film Festival.

Ashlee Page was honoured at the 2014 Sundance Film Festival, as a recipient of the Mahindra Global Filmmaking (MGF) Award.

Daniel Soekov won the Gold at the ACS awards 2013 for his news story ‘Christmas Island Detention’.

At the SASA Awards held at Mercury Cinema, the following MAPS Film School student and alumni films were nominated.

2013

- Best Feature - 52 Tuesdays: Bryan Mason
- Best Short - Omega: Peter Ninos
- Best Short - Deluge: Danny & Michael Philippou
- Best Web Series/Animation- Peleda: Luke Jurevicius
- Best Drama - Border: Nima Raoofi
- Best Music Video - I Think I Might Be Dying: Adam Camporeale
- Best Music Video - Tanks of Dust: Adam Camporeale
- Best Music Video - The Church of the Technochrist: Adam Camporeale
- Best Performance - Deluge: Michael Beck
- Best Cinematographer - Deluge: Hussain Neissi
- Best Editor - Close in Heart: Danielle Tinker
- Best Sound - Deluge: Nicholas Steele
- Best Sound - Carbon Daters: Beau Gosling
- Best Writers - Deluge: Michael Beck, Danny Philippou
- Best Writers - Close in Heart: Danielle Tinker
- Best Writers - Omega: Peter Ninos

A Dance in the Garden Reminds Me by Gemma Salomon received the SASA award in the 2012 Best Non-Narrative Film category.

2013

- Best Drama - Brake: Michael Philippou
- Best Documentary - Born to Run: Hussain Neissi
- Best Comedy - Pardesi: Danielle Tinker
- Best Composition - Love Letters: Jed Summers
- Best Direction - Pardesi: Danielle Tinker
- Best Screenplay - Pardesi: Danielle Tinker

MAPS alumni Sandra Cook's The Ride won the 2013 SASA Best Feature Award and Daniel Vink won for his work on The Martyr.

In June 2013 New Shoes by student Nima Raoofi surpassed the six million view count on YouTube, garnering media attention

== Alumni ==
- Des Keneally - sound recordist on The Snowtown Murders.
- Ashlee Page - director of The Kiss (2010) and The Turning: On Her Knees (2013).
- Sandra Cook - director of The Ride (2012)
