= Chitrasutram =

Chitasutram (The Image Threads)
- Directed by: Vipin Vijay
- Screenplay by: Vipin Vijay
- Story by: M. Nandakumar
- Produced by: Altaf Mazid, Zubeen Ahmad, Sushanta Roy
- Cinematography: Shahnad Jalal
- Edited by: Debkamal Ganguly
- Release date: 2010
- Running time: 104 minutes
- Country: India
- Language: Malayalam

Chitrasutram (The Image Threads) is a 2010 Malayalam film, written & directed by Vipin Vijay, produced by Altaf Mazid, Zubeen Ahmad, Sushanta Roy under the banner of Unknown Films. The film was also supported by Hubert Bals Film Fund, Rotterdam, Goteborg Film Fund, Goteborg, Sweden and the Global Film Initiative, US.

== Synopsis ==
The film follows a computer teacher, his grandfather, who practices black magic, and a cyber-creature. Their paths intersect through a series of online and offline encounters. As the narrative progresses, the imagery on the computer screen becomes increasingly abstract, eventually reducing to a single pulsating pixel, suggesting the story may begin again.

== Cast ==
- Sandeep Chatterjee
- Reghoothaman
- Athira
- Arundathi Singha
- Gopalan
- Aadarsha Kumar

== Major Awards Won ==
- International Film Festival of Kerala : Hassan Kutty Award for the Best Debut Director.
- National Film Award 2010 : Best Sound Design.
- Kerala State Award 2010: Special Jury Award for the Director | Best Cinematographer | Best Sound Recordist.
- Padmarajan Puraskaram 2010: Best Director | Best Script Writer.
- John Abraham Award 2010: Special Jury Award for the Director.

== Film Festival Screenings ==
- International Film Festival Rotterdam 2011.(Tiger Awards Competition)
- International Film Festival of Kerala.
- Göteborg International Film Festival, 2011
- São Paulo International Film Festival
- South Asian International Film Festival in New York, 2010
- 10th Asian Film Festival of Dallas-
- 11th International Film Festival, Wroclaw. Poland- 2011
- International Film festival, Vladivostok, Russia.
- International Documentary Film festival; Copenhagen

== Reception ==
Film Critic Dustin Chang witting on the film said " Director Vipin Vijay and his cinematographer Shehnad Jalal often distinguish, then blur the boundaries between the past and present, technology and nature, reality and fantasy, tangible and intangible. Devoid of any visible narrative, The Image Thread is unlike any film I've ever seen. It is more like a visual essay than a film. To enjoy it, you have to give in to its luscious visuals to wash over you. Calming and hypnotic, it's literally one of the best films to meditate on.
