= State Institute of Film and Television =

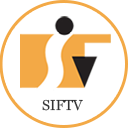
- Type: Film Institute
- Established: 2011
- Academic affiliations: State University of Performing And Visual Arts
- Head of Department: Mahesh Thottathil
- Location: Rohtak, Haryana, India; 28°54′31″N 76°36′24″E
- Website: http://supva.ac.in/

The State Institute of Film and Television (SIFTV) is a Film School under the State University of Performing And Visual Arts located in Rohtak, Haryana, India. The institute was established in 2011 by the Government of Haryana to grow regional cinema.

== History ==
The institute was established in 2011. The Integrated Institutional Campus at Rohtak comprises four institutions, namely State Institute of Design (SID), State Institute of Fine Arts (SIFA), State Institute of Film and Television (SIFTV) and State Institute of Urban Planning and Architecture (SIUPA). These institutions are being established at a capital expenditure of Rs.300.0 crores by Govt. of Haryana through Government Technical Institution Society (GTIS), Rohtak. After 2014 these institutes were affiliated to State University of Performing And Visual Arts.

== Courses ==
The Institute of Film and Television is a part of the larger campus with necessary and modern facilities for training students in the art of film making. While students grasp the practical aspect of film making, they also learn the finer nuances of this art. They begin to view their art in context with the moving image and the impact it has on the viewers. There are five fields of this art in which training is offered. A common thread that binds all the courses is a one-year foundation course where all students, irrespective of their chosen discipline, learn all aspects of film making at a basic level. This is considered essential to imbibe team spirit and equipping a student so that he/she understand the job responsibilities and crafts of other crew members of a film making team. From the second year onwards the focus shifts to a better understanding of the student’s chosen field of specialisation. Other than acquiring professional skill in the specialization, a student also learns aesthetics and finer points of the art. Intensity of practical work increases in proportion to theoretical inputs and there is frequent interaction with visiting faculty from the film and television industry. Study tours also enrich students’ experience. By the third year a student acquires sufficient knowledge of his/her field of specialization, and enough practical exercises are stated where he/she can showcase conceptual and technical skills culminating in the year end project that compares to a near professional, finished film. This is his/her show reel. The institute offers following streams: Acting, Cinematography, Direction, Editing, Sound Recording and Sound Design.

S.No.	Course	Duration in Years	Intake Capacity
1	Acting	4	15
2	Cinematography	4	15
3	Direction	4	15
4	Editing	4	15
5	Sound Recording & Sound Design	4	15

== Admission process ==
- 1. Eligibility
  - 10+2 examination passed or appearing under recognized Central/State Board of Secondary Education/ Council for Indian School of Certificate Examination, New Delhi. The minimum 10+2 aggregate percentage should be 50% or more. or 3 years Diploma recognized by AICTE or a State Board of Technical Education with aggregate percentage of 50%.
- 2. Entrance Examination Process
  - (a) Written Test
  - (b) Skill Test

== See also ==
- Bhartendu Natya Academy
- Film and Television Institute of India
- Government Film and Television Institute
- Jyoti Chitraban Film and Television Institute
- K. R. Narayanan National Institute of Visual Science and Arts
- M.G.R. Government Film and Television Training Institute
- State Institute of Urban Planning and Architecture
