= Roma Film Academy =

Coordinates: 41.8467984°N 12.5782397°E

- Motto: Ars Docendi Artem
- Established: 2014
- Location: Rome, Italy
- Website: www.romafilmacademy.it

The Roma Film Academy (RFA) is an Italian film school situated in Cinecittà Studios, Rome. Founded in 2014 as a private school, the RFA provides practical courses on a variety of film-making skills. It is an academic structure devoted to culture and education especially concentrated in the artistic context, above all in audiovisual communication and entertainment. In particular, it is proposed as a reference point for whoever is interested in undertaking a professional career in all those activities that revolve around cinema and television business.

The academic courses are biennial professional courses. There are eight subjects of specialization, that is, Directing, Acting, Production, Screenplay, Direction of Photography, Sound, Editing, and Costume. It also provides students with several facilities, included classrooms, a theatre, and various sets.
