= Dr. Bhupen Hazarika Regional Government Film and Television Institute =

DBHRGFTI
- Dr. Bhupen Hazarika Regional Government Film and Television Institute
- Founded: 1961; 65 years ago
- Type: Film school
- Headquarters: Sila, Changsari, Assam, India
- Location: India
- Chairman & Responsible Officer(RO): Meenakshi Das Nath, ACS
- Key people: Bhupen Hazarika; Bishnuprasad Rabha
- Website: dbhrgfti.assam.gov.in

Dr. Bhupen Hazarika Regional Government Film and Television Institute, formerly known as the Jyoti Chitraban Film and Television Institute, is the only government-owned film institute in northeastern India located at Sila, Changsari in Assam. It was named after Jyoti Prasad Agarwala, the first Assamese film director and producer. The Jyoti Chitraban Film Studio was established in the year of 1961 by the Government of Assam. The Film Institute was set up at the same Studio premises using the same infrastructure in the year 1999.

== History ==
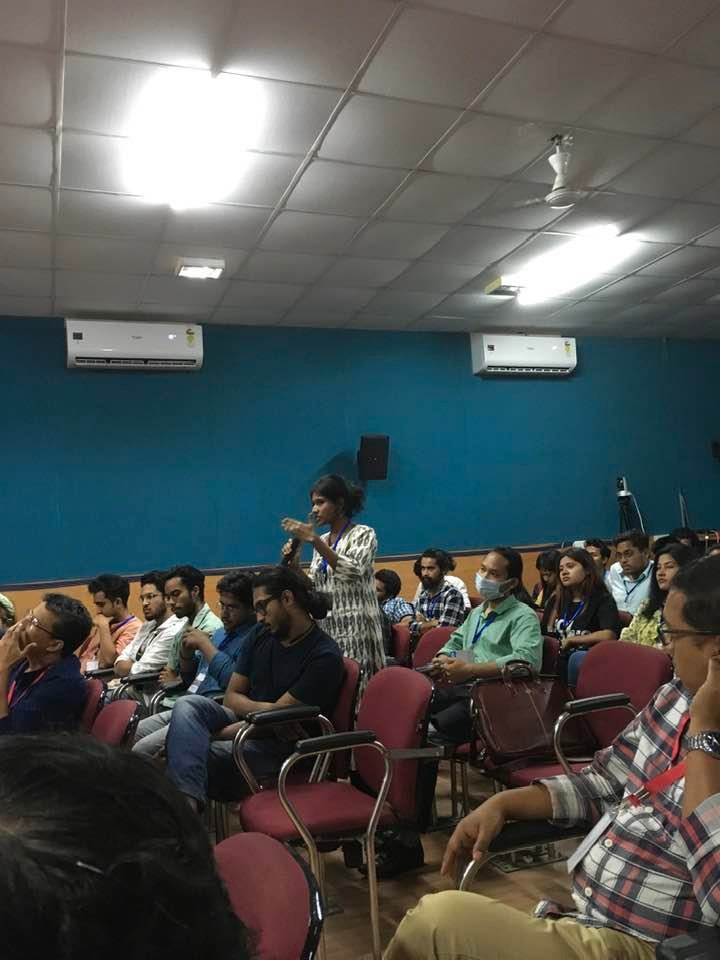
Prajapita Debroy interacting with a speaker at a conference organized by DBHRGFTI and on her left film scholar Aloy Deb Barma

Having seen the increasing demands for technically well-equipped film technicians in the regional film industry in the last few of years of the 20th century, the Governing Body of Jyoti Chitraban (Film Studio) Society (JCFS) decided to establish a film institute in the Jyoti Chitraban film studio. In this regard the society has acquired the formal permission from the Ministry of Education, Govt. of Assam vide letter No. TEC. 131/96/22 dated Dispur, 14 December 1998 to establish the institute & thus the institute came into existence on 17 January 1999. by the name Jyoti Chitraban Film and Television Institute (JCFTI).

Jyoti Chitraban (Film Studio) Society remained as the mother concern providing all sorts of existing audio-visual equipments of the studio and other logistics required to run the institute till 2011. In 2011 the institute was bifurcated from the studio and became a complete government entity by the name Regional Government Film and Television Institute (RGFTI). Then again in 2016 the institute was renamed as Dr. Bhupen Hazarika Regional Government Film and Television Institute (DBHRGFTI) by the Govt. of Assam.

For many years DBHRGFTI was the only institute of its kind in the entire north-eastern region of India.

The Guwahati International Film Festival (GIFF) is put on by the Jyoti Chitraban (Film Studio) Society in cooperation with the Dr. Bhupen Hazarika Regional Government Film and Television Institute in Assam, India. The festival will take place in Guwahati from October 28 through November 2 at Jyoti Chitraban Film Studio and Srimanta Sankardev Kalakshetra.

== The studio today ==
The film studio covers an area of 73 bigha. It is equipped with ultra-modern floors, ultra-modern trolley-volley-cum-crane, 16 mm movie camera, lights etc. Till now, more than 200 films have been released from it.

== Courses offered ==
Now the institute offers some courses related to film and television are:

- Diploma in Audiography and Sound Engineering
- Diploma in Motion Picture Photography
- Diploma in Editing Motion Picture
- Certificate in Applied Acting

== See also ==
- Film and Television Institute of India
- Bhartendu Natya Academy
- Cinema of India
- Film and Television Institute of India alumni
- Film school
- Satyajit Ray Film and Television Institute
- State Institute of Film and Television
- Government Film and Television Institute
- M.G.R. Government Film and Television Training Institute
- Biju Pattnaik Film and Television Institute of Odisha
