= MSU MFA Program in Science & Natural History Filmmaking =

Montana State University’s Master of Fine Arts Program in Science & Natural History Filmmaking (SNHF), founded in 2000, continues to be the only MFA program of its kind in the world. It takes students with backgrounds in science, engineering, and technology and prepares them as filmmakers with the creative and critical skills necessary to produce work that contributes to the public understanding of science. Students in the program come from a wide variety of backgrounds including the physical sciences, the social sciences, engineering, technology, medicine, and law.

The SNHF Program is part of Montana State University’s School of Film and Photography, which also offers undergraduate degrees in filmmaking and photography.

The program trains directors and producers who are familiar with all parts of the movie-making process. Students in the SNHF Program produce works that range from documentary to experimental. Many of these student films have received festival awards, while others have been broadcast in many major venues such as PBS, The Discovery Channel, National Geographic Channel, The Science Channel, CNN, 60 Minutes II, CBS Evening News, and NBC Nightly News. The students have produced films for the National Park Service, the National Science Foundation, the U.S. Department of Agriculture, National Oceanic and Atmospheric Administration, NASA, and such non-profit organizations including the Wildlife Conservation Society, the Sierra Club, the Audubon Society, and the Nature Conservancy. Student work from the SNHF Program has appeared in major museums, schools, and cultural venues.

Each year, SNHF student films are screened at the Element Film Festival in Bozeman, Montana.

== Selected Awards and Festival Screenings ==
- Student Emmy, Entertainment Category, 2010 – Montana Fare by SNHF alumnus Jaime Jelenchick Jacobsen
- Official Selection, 2010 Big Sky Documentary Film Festival – 200 Block by SNHF students Andrew Sobey & Kate Lain
- Best International Student Film, 2009 CMS Vatavaran Environment and Wildlife Film Festival – Why Don't We Ride Zebras? by SNHF alumnus Hannah Smith Walker
- Official Selections, 2009 Montana Cine International Film Festival – Lessons in America - Episode 17: Montana by SNHF student Andrew Sobey, Ceiba by SNHF student Dawson Dunning, student film Disturbance by SNHF alumnus Jeremy Roberts
- Telly award, Classic category, 2009 – student film Atlatl by SNHF alumnus Jeremy Roberts
- Telly award, 2009 – student film Disturbance by SNHF alumnus Jeremy Roberts
- Best Nonbroadcast Program, 2009 Jackson Hole Wildlife Film Festival – SNHF student Jen Grace for Frog, Chemical, Water, You
- Best Limited Series, 2009 Jackson Hole Wildlife Film Festival – SNHF alumnus John Shier, Director of Photography for BBC Natural History Unit/Animal Planet's Yellowstone
- Marion Zunz Newcomer Finalist and Best Conservation Program Finalist, 2009 Jackson Hole Wildlife Film Festival – SNHF alumnus Eric Bendick for student film Division Street
- Best Children's Program Finalist, 2009 Jackson Hole Wildlife Film Festival – SNHF student Jen Grace for Frog, Chemical, Water, You
- Best Newcomer Award, 2009 International Wildlife Film Festival – SNHF student Jen Grace for Frog, Chemical, Water, You
- CINE Golden Eagle, 2009 – Montana Fare by SNHF alumnus Jaime Jelenchick Jacobsen
- Official Selection, 2009 1 Reel Film Festival at Bumbershoot – 200 Block by SNHF students Andrew Sobey & Kate Lain
- Best Newcomer Award, 2009 International Wildlife Film Festival – SNHF student Jen Grace for Frog, Chemical, Water, You
- Best Music Video Award and Best Amateur Award, 2009 International Wildlife Film Festival – SNHF student Josh Cassidy for Life by the Tide
- Merit Award for Artistic Approach, 2009 International Wildlife Film Festival – SNHF student Jeremy Roberts for Disturbance
- Merit Awards for Educational Value, 2009 International Wildlife Film Festival – SNHF alumnus Ed Watkins for student film Into the Cool: The Living and SNHF alumnus Hannah Smith Walker for student film Why Don't We Ride Zebras?
- Honorable Mention, 2009 International Wildlife Film Festival, Animation Category – SNHF student Andrew Sobey for Lessons in America - Episode 17: Montana
- Student Emmy, Children's Category, 2009 – Frog, Chemical, Water, You by SNHF student Jen Grace
- Director's Choice 3rd Prize, 2009 Black Maria Film + Video Film Festival – The Death of Grandma Gladys by SNHF student Kate Lain
- Official Selections, 2009 Big Sky Documentary Film Festival – Lessons in America - Episode 17: Montana by SNHF student Andrew Sobey and The Mongolian Marmot by SNHF student Tom Winston
- Act Locally Award, 2009 EarthVision Environmental Film Festival – Why Don't We Ride Zebras? by SNHF alumnus Hannah Smith Walker
- Metcalf Institute for Marine and Environmental Reporting Fellowship, 2008 – SNHF student Rick Smith
- Montana Filmmaker Award, 2008 International Wildlife Film Festival – SNHF student Rick Smith for Fish and Cow
- Silver Telly Award Winner, 2008 – The Water Carriers by SNHF alumnus Jaime Jelenchick Jacobsen
- Best Amateur, Montana CINE International Film Festival, 2008 – The Water Carriers by SNHF alumnus Jaime Jelenchick Jacobsen
- Emmy Nomination, Outstanding Special Class: Short-format Nonfiction Programs, 2008 – Deadliest Catch: “The Real Dutch”, directed and edited by SNHF alumnus Vanessa Serrao
- Student Emmy, Documentary Category, 2008 – Little Mom Full of Color by SNHF student Katy-Robin Garton Magruder
- CINE Golden Eagle, 2008 – Malice In Wonderland by SNHF student Ed Watkins
- Marion Zunz Newcomer Finalist, 2007 Jackson Hole Wildlife Film Festival – SNHF student Rick Smith for Fish and Cow
- Best New Media Finalist, 2007 Jackson Hole Wildlife Film Festival - SNHF student Rob Nelson for the Ecogeeks Science Video Podcast
- CINE Golden Eagle, 2007. CINE Special Jury Award 2007 – Lunacy by SNHF student Ed Watkins
- Best Student Film, 2007 Swansea Bay Film Festival – Up a Creek by SNHF student Jefferson Beck
- Two Silver Telly Awards, 2007 – Beyond Road's End by SNHF student Ed Watkins
- Student Emmy, Documentary Category, 2005 – Indian Leopards: The Killing Fields by SNHF student Praveen Singh
