= Gulf Islands Film and Television School =

Film school on Galiano Island, Canada

Gulf Islands Film and Television School (GIFTS)
- Motto: Leading Canada's Media Revolution since 1995
- Established: 1995
- Founder: George Harris
- Director: Evan Allen and Barbara Allen
- Location: Galiano Island, British Columbia, Canada, Canada; 48°55′40″N 123°27′11″W
- Nickname: GIFTS

The Gulf Islands Film and Television School (GIFTS) is a film school located on Galiano Island, British Columbia, Canada. It was initially founded by George Harris in 1995, but was purchased by Evan Allen and Barbara Allen in 2014.
