= Ghetto Film School =

Nonprofit film school

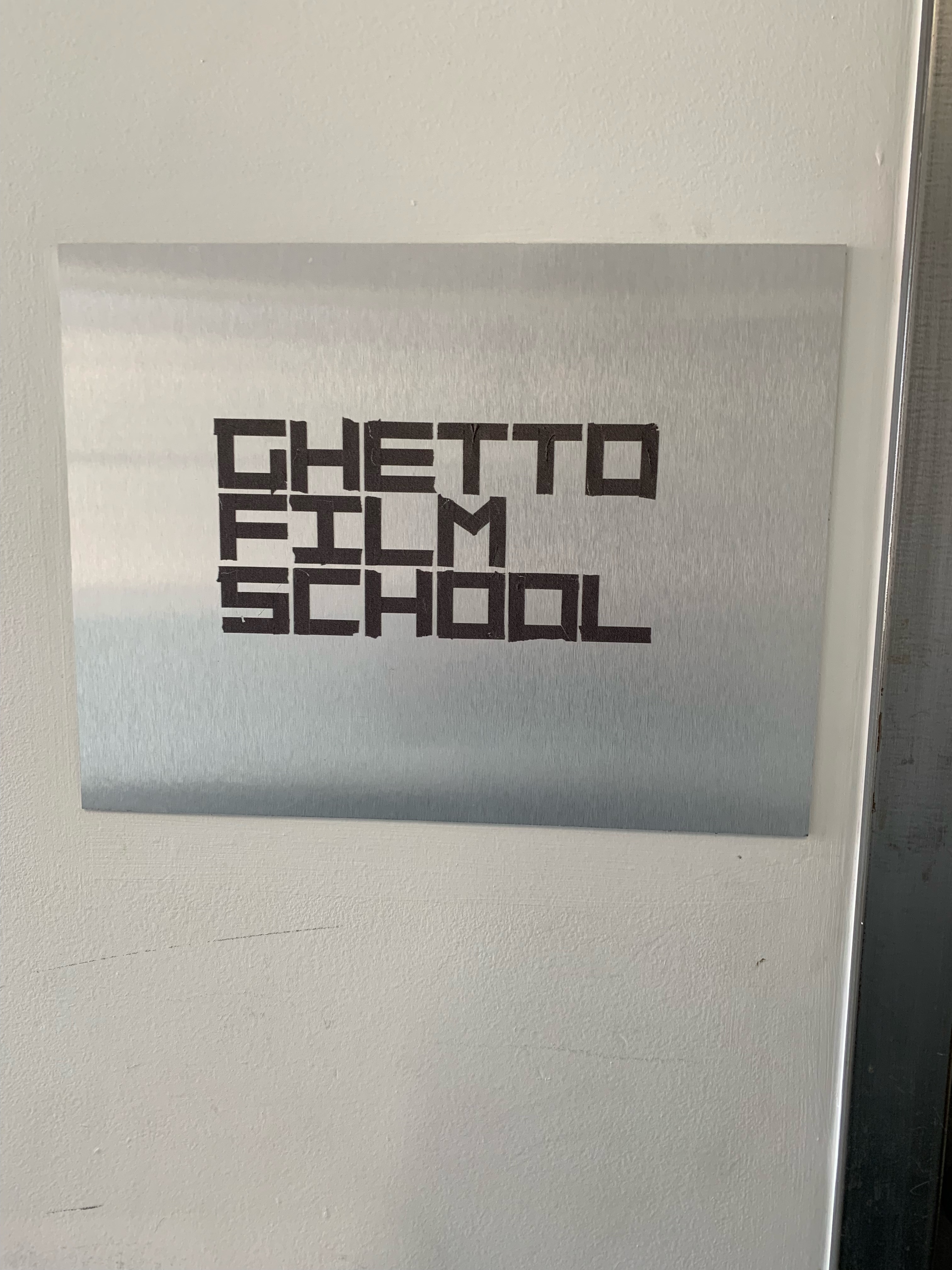
- Ghetto Film School NY in New York City
- Formation: 2000; 26 years ago
- Founder: Joe Hall
- Type: Film School
- Tax ID no.: 13-4127229
- Legal status: 501(c)(3) organization
- Region served: Global
- CEO: Montea Robinson
- Main organ: Board of Directors
- Website: www.ghettofilm.org

Ghetto Film School (GFS) is a nonprofit organization offering practical experience to aspiring filmmakers in South Bronx, New York City. Since its 2000 founding in New York, other schools have been established in Los Angeles and London. Classes are free and it chiefly serves young people who may not otherwise have the opportunity to study filmmaking.

== History ==
Ghetto Film School was founded in South Bronx 2000 by Joe Hall, a former social worker from the Bronx.

The Los Angeles school was the second location for GFS.

Ghetto Film School (GFS) London was launched in summer 2020 by founding co-partner, media production group Sister, co-founded and operated by Elisabeth Murdoch, daughter of media magnate Rupert Murdoch. The school was set up in its physical location in 2021.

Owing to the COVID-19 pandemic, classes started online.

== Description ==
Ghetto Film School is a nonprofit organization offering practical experience to aspiring filmmakers. GFS has locations in New York City, Los Angeles, and London. The London school (GFS LDN) is based in a school in Shoreditch, in east London. There were 40 active students in 2024, of whom 65% were young women and 60% young Black people.

== Curriculum ==
In New York, the organization has a 30-month filmmaking curriculum, free to high-school students who attend on Saturdays and during the summer. GFS also has a Roster Program which connects its alumni to industry contacts. According to the school, it serves 8,000 individuals annually. Many GFS graduates go on to work in the film business.

In London, students attend on Saturdays and during school holidays.

== Leadership ==
Alumna Montea Robinson was appointed CEO in 2022. The board includes many industry professionals such as Peter Cramer, James Murdoch, Lee Daniels, and Abby Pucker.

As of November 2024, Tony Fernandes, a GFS alumnus, is executive director of GFS London. He has been in the position since its establishment.

GFS partners with several corporations including Dolby Laboratories, Disney, Red Bull, and Universal Studio Group.
