= Hussian College =

Private art school in Philadelphia, Pennsylvania

Coordinates: 39.94971°N 75.14851°W

Hussian College was a private art school in Philadelphia, Pennsylvania. Established in 1946, it offered only one degree, the Bachelor of Fine Arts (BFA). It has a campus in Los Angeles, the Studio School. In August 2023, the college abruptly announced that it was closing.

== History ==
The first class at Hussian School of Art commenced on July 1, 1946. John Hussian, a member of Philadelphia's art community and a renowned lecturer, was encouraged by what is now the Philadelphia Museum of Art to open a school for veterans returning from World War II. Working under the G.I. Bill, Hussian worked with the Pennsylvania Department of Education Vocational Training and the Veterans Administration to provide training in fine art.

In the 1960s, many local competitors transitioned to collegiate status, while feedback from the industry and enrollment numbers indicated a continued need for career training in the visual arts. With Hussian's guidance as president, the curriculum shifted to concentrate on commercial art. Hussian became a charter member in PAPSA (Pennsylvania Association of Private School Administrators) in the early 1960s.

The school was incorporated on July 1, 1969, and received its initial national accreditation as a member of National Association of Trade and Technical Schools (NATTS) in 1972.

In 1973, Ronald Dove became president of the Hussian School of Art. Dove adopted the same curriculum model and education philosophy that Hussian had established for the institution. In 1978, Hussian applied to the Pennsylvania Department of Education for consideration to award a 4-year AST degree. Formal approval to award the degree was granted in May 1979. In 1992, Hussian received its initial accreditation from ACCSCT, now ACCSC, and has remained in good standing from the time of initial accreditation.

As Dove retired, he appointed Bruce Wartman as president in July 2010 with the intention to train his predecessor as he reduced his responsibilities. Dove's health began to suffer and he decided to sell the institution in 2011 to Education Equities, LLC. With the change of ownership, a formal board of directors was established and a strategic plan for the institution was created based on a needs assessment of the modern job market and professional art community. The planning process included introducing new institutional policies, introducing new digital media curriculum, hiring more faculty, and transitioning the institution to collegiate status.

In May 2012, Bruce Wartman stepped down from the position of president. Alan Garfield served as interim president for three months while the board of directors conducted a search. In August 2012, Melissa Morgan, who was acting as Dean of Academic Affairs, was appointed president.

In November 2013, Hussian was granted the ability to begin conferring a Bachelor of Fine Arts (BFA) degree by the Pennsylvania Department of Education and immediately began the approval process with ACCSC. In January 2014, Hussian received approval to add the BFA to Hussian's list of ACCSC approved programs. In January 2015 Hussian College received final approvals from the Commonwealth of Pennsylvania and ACCSC to change the institution name from Hussian School of Art to Hussian College.

== Closure ==
In August 2023, the college abruptly announced that it was no longer enrolling students and was closing. Its board of trustees voted to close the college after finding "that the financial distress of the college was much deeper than previously reported and there is no way forward."

== Notable alumni ==
Notable alumni of the Hussian School of Art include 1950s Marvel Comics artist Joe Maneely, and his classmate George Ward, an artist for periodicals including the Philadelphia Bulletin and the New York Daily News, and a 1950s assistant on Walt Kelly's comic strip Pogo. Arif Zahir, the voice since 2021 of Family Guy character Cleveland Brown attended the Los Angeles campus.

== See also ==
- List of colleges and universities in Pennsylvania
- List of colleges and universities in California
- List of art schools
- List of film schools in the United States
