= Government Film and Television Institute =

Educational institution in Karnataka, India

Government Film & Television Institute (GFTI)
- Type: Film school
- Established: August 1943 (as S.J. Polytechnic)
- Founder: M. Visvesvaraya
- Affiliations: Directorate of Technical Education, Karnataka
- Location: Hesaraghatta, Bengaluru, Karnataka, India
- Campus: Rural
- Website: https://gpt.karnataka.gov.in/gftihesaraghatta/public/6/about-us/en

The Government Film & Television Institute, Bangalore (formerly a part of S.J.Polytechnic) is believed to be the first government institute in India to offer technical courses related to films. It is one of the few government film institutes in India. The institute is located at Hesaraghatta, Bengaluru in Karnataka. It is under the Directorate of Technical Education, Government of Karnataka. The institute offers three-year diploma courses in Cinematography and Sound Recording and Engineering. The diploma certificates are awarded by the Department of Technical Education, Government of Karnataka.

== History ==
M. Visvesvaraya founded the Sri Jayachamarajendra Occupational Institute in August 1945 in Bengaluru, named after the Maharaja of Mysore. It aimed to provide trained technicians to the industries that were then developing rapidly. It offered training in engineering and crafts subjects including ceramics, instrument technology, boilers and engines, welding and metalwork, cinematography, sound and radio engineering. It was the first educational institution of its kind in India.

In September 1996 the courses in cinematography and sound & television were transferred to the newly opened Government Film & Television Institute in Hesaraghatta under the World Bank Assisted Project for Technician Development in India.

== Location ==
The Institute is situated in Hesaraghatta about 30 km from the city and covers 25 acres.

== Courses ==
Government Film & Television Institute offers two 3 year Diploma courses in Cinematography and Sound Recording & Engg. The intake of students for each course is 33for cinematography and 17 for Sound Recording .

=== Cinematography ===
The 3-year study in Cinematography covers Still Photography, Motion Picture Photography and Videography with subjects like Film Analysis & Appreciation, Visual Composition, Filming Techniques, Lighting Techniques, Film Processing, Film Projection, Electronic Cinematography, Television Production, Multimedia, Computer Graphics & Animation.

The Cinematography department has two Still Photography Studios, Motion Picture Labs, Television Production Floor and an acoustically treated Film Shooting Floor with a viewers gallery.

Eligibility Karnataka SSLC or Equivalent

Lateral entry : 10+2 or Karnataka II PUC with PCM or Equivalent

=== Sound Engineering ===
The Sound Recording & Engineering course covers recording techniques, architectural acoustics, digital recording, music, analog and digital electronics, communication engineering and television engineering.

The Sound Recording department has a studio which can be used for recording music, voice dubbing, background scoring in analog and digital formats. It has a digital audio workstation, video post-production console, film projection booth, electronics lab and computer Lab.

Eligibility Karnataka SSLC or Equivalent

Lateral entry : 10+2 or Karnataka II PUC with PCM or Equivalent

== Notable alumni ==
- V. K. Murthy
- Ashok Kashyap
- Girish Gangadharan
- SNS Sastry
- Govind Nihalani
- Jomon T. John
- Master Manjunath
- Santosh Rai Pathaje
- Satya Hegde
- Shekhar Chandru
- S. Krishna
- Rajmohan Saviram
- Rishab Shetty

== See also ==
- Cinema of India
- Film and Television Institute of India
- List of film schools
- K. R. Narayanan National Institute of Visual Science and Arts
