= Film school =

Educational institution dedicated to filmmaking

A film school is an educational institution dedicated to teaching aspects of filmmaking, including such subjects as film production, film theory, digital media production, and screenwriting. Film history courses and hands-on technical training are usually incorporated into most film school curricula. Technical training may include instruction in the use and operation of cameras, lighting equipment, film or video editing equipment and software, and other relevant equipment. Film schools may also include courses and training in such subjects as television production, broadcasting, audio engineering, and animation.

== History ==
The formal teaching of film began with theory rather than practical technical training starting soon after the development of the filmmaking process in the 1890s. Early film theorists were more interested in writing essays on film theory than in teaching students in a classroom environment. The Moscow Film School was founded in 1919 with Russian filmmakers including Sergei Eisenstein, Vsevolod Pudovkin, and Lev Kuleshov serving as faculty to disseminate their very distinct viewpoints on the purpose of film.

Those seeking to learn the technical craft of filmmaking in the early days of cinema were largely self-taught engineers or still photographers who experimented with new film technology. With the rise of commercial filmmaking in the 1920s, most notably the Hollywood studio system, those seeking to learn the technical skills of filmmaking most often started at the bottom of a hierarchical system and apprenticed under a more experienced person to learn the trade. Filmmakers such as Alfred Hitchcock and David Lean started in this way, beginning as a title card designer and clapperboard assistant, respectively, in the early 1920s. The USC School of Cinematic Arts was founded in the midst of this Hollywood system in 1929, and continues to be widely recognized as one of the most prestigious film schools in the world. The University of Southern California was the first university in the country to offer a Bachelor of Arts degree in film.

The tradition of apprenticing up through a hierarchical system continues to this day within film studios and in television in many technical positions such as gaffers, grips, camera operators, and even into post-production with editing and color correction. Independent lower budget filmmaking in the post-war period using portable 16mm film cameras allowed filmmakers like John Cassavetes in the United States, along with members of the French New Wave and Italian Neorealism in Europe, to circumvent the classical system.

The notion of a granting a four-year college degree in film grew more popular in the 1960s with the founding of prestigious film departments like the New York University Tisch School of the Arts (1965), Walt Disney founded California Institute of the Arts (1961), the University of Texas department of Radio-Television-Film (1965) and the Columbia University School of the Arts (1965). Over the years competition for admissions to these programs has steadily increased with many undergraduate programs accepting less than 10% of applicants, and with even more stringent selection for graduate programs.

In the 1990s and 2000s, the increased difficulties in getting into and the financial costs of attending these programs have caused many to spend their money self-financing their own features or attending a shorter trade school program for around the same costs. Film trade schools however rarely offer more than technical knowledge, and often cost more than a degree from a public university without providing the security of a four-year college degree to fall back on.

== Types of film schools ==
A film school may be part of an existing public or private college or university, or part of a privately owned for-profit institution. Depending on whether the curriculum of a film school meets its state's academic requirements for the conferral of a degree, completion of studies in a film school may culminate in an undergraduate or graduate degree, or a certificate of completion. Some institutions, both accredited and non-accredited, run shorter workshop and conservatory programs concurrent to longer degree courses.

Not only the types of courses on offer but also the content, cost, and duration of the courses differs greatly between larger institutions and bespoke film schools. Universities offer courses ranging from 1 to 4 years, with the majority lasting 3 or 4 years. Conversely, films schools focus on shorter technical courses of 1 or 2 years.

Many film schools still teach students how to use actual film in their productions, although the incorporation of digital media in film school curricula has risen drastically in recent years. Some schools offer only digital filmmaking courses, eschewing instruction in the medium of film altogether. The use of digital cameras and digital media is significantly less expensive than film cameras and film stock, and allows a film school or department to offer more equipment for students with which to learn and use for their projects. In addition, digital media (such as DVD) is often used for in-class screenings.

In recent years, online film schools of sorts have sprung up teaching filmmaking through articles, tutorial videos, and interactive forums. The next generation of digital cinematography using the large sensors and manual features available in still DSLR cameras has lowered the barrier further towards creating inexpensive digital video that compares closely to 35mm film.

== Benefits debated ==
Professionals in the film industry hold a variety of opinions on the relevance of a degree in film in relation to the ability to find work and succeed in the field. As in many professions in the arts, some feel that talent cannot be taught. With respect to filmmaking, others feel that learning techniques and understanding the business is crucial to one's success as a filmmaker.

Those who argue against the necessity of film school cite the high cost of such an education as prohibitive and assert that an aspiring filmmaker's money would be better spent on the actual making of a film, the experience of which would offer a more practical hands-on education. At many film schools, including NYU and USC, initial student films in non-digital programs are shot with non-synch Arri-S or Bolex film cameras manufactured in the mid 20th century. These films are typically shot on black and white reversal film with no dialog, or limited sound added after shooting. Supporters argue that shooting films like these challenges students to creatively express their story without relying on dialog or other modern conventional devices. Opponents question the practicality of having students invest a substantial amount of money using equipment that is no longer used in the industry and doing simple filmmaking exercises that could be recreated for much less.

Film school proponents argue that a formal education allows for a more rounded theoretical understanding of techniques, and offers the opportunity to gain from the knowledge and experience of professional instructors who work in, or who have worked in, the industry. Often cited as another benefit of film school are the opportunities available to students to work as an intern for filmmakers or in related businesses, such as post-production editing facilities, and to network with others interested in filmmaking who may be in a position to collaborate with the student on a project or to eventually offer work in the industry. Most film schools will hold a festival, or showcase, of student works at the end of a semester or school year. The more prestigious institutions often invite industry executives and producers to attend. However, ambitious individuals not in film school can also pursue such opportunities on their own through cold-calling, joining film-industry-related organizations such as IFP, or submitting their work to independent film festivals.

The rise and popularity of independent filmmaking and digital video have influenced this debate, as anyone with a digital camera can shoot a digital work with little formal knowledge of the industry, and can succeed or establish a following by making the work available for viewing or by publicizing it on the internet.

Directors who have attended and earned degrees from film schools include Francis Ford Coppola (UCLA Film School, MFA film directing), Martin Scorsese (NYU Film School, MFA film directing), David Lynch (AFI Conservatory, MFA Film Directing), George Lucas (USC Film School, BA film directing) and Kathryn Bigelow (Columbia School of Arts, master's degree in film theory and criticism). Others, such as Stanley Kubrick, Frank Capra, Pedro Almodóvar, Bernardo Bertolucci, Paul Thomas Anderson, Sofia Coppola, Quentin Tarantino, James Cameron, and Alfred Hitchcock had no formal college film training at all. Film director Werner Herzog has been quite vocal in arguing against film school.

== See also ==
- List of film schools
- List of film schools in the United States
- History of film
- Film theory
- Film studies
- Philosophy of film
- Ghetto Film School
