= Tim Guleri =

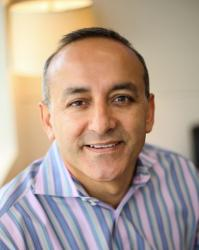
- Education: BS in Electrical Engineering, Punjab Engineering College, Chandigarh, India; MS in Robotics and Industrial Engineering, Virginia Tech, Virginia, USA
- Occupations: Managing director, Sierra Ventures

Tim Guleri is an American venture capitalist and serial entrepreneur. He is the managing director of Sierra Ventures of San Mateo, California. Prior to joining Sierra Ventures, Guleri helped build Scopus Technology and founded Octane Software.

== Early life and education ==
Tim Guleri received his Bachelor of Science degree in electrical engineering from Punjab Engineering College, Chandigarh, India in 1986. He received his master's degree in robotics and industrial engineering from Virginia Tech in 1988 and was inducted into the Academy of Distinguished Alumni in 2006. He sold books door to door to put himself through graduate school.

== Career ==
In September 1989, Guleri became part of the information technology team at LSI Logic Corporation. In 1992, he joined Scopus Technology, a customer relationship management software company, where he was vice president of field operations until 1996. Scopus went public in 1995, and was acquired by Seibel Systems in 1998 for $750 million.

Guleri founded the ecommerce company Octane Software in 1997. He was the CEO of Octane until it sold to Epiphany, Inc. in 2000 for $3.2 billion in stock. Guleri led the merger of the two companies and served as the executive vice president of Epiphany from March 2000 until February 2001. He joined Sierra Ventures, an early-stage venture capital firm that is focused on enterprise technology, as managing director of the software team in 2001. At Sierra, Guleri worked with investments in software and open source development. Through his investments from Sierra, he has taken companies Sourcefire and MakeMyTrip public. Other investments with notable exits include: Sourcefire (acquired by Cisco in for $2.7 billion), Shape Security (acquired by F5 for $1 billion), Treasure Data (acquired by Arm for $600 million), and Greenplum (acquired by EMC for $400 million).

== Other investment activities ==
During his time at Sierra Ventures, Guleri has led investments and served on the board of directors for companies such as Again Technologies, Approva, BINA Technologies CodeGreen Networks, Greenplum, Hired.com, MakeMyTrip.com, an online flight booking service based in India, Sourcefire, and Ventaso, a business software company. He currently sits on the board of directors for companies including Astronomer, Fabric, Phenom, and Treasure Data.

== Philanthropy ==
In 2023, Guleri and his alma mater, Punjab Engineering College, established the "Lt. Col. S.C.S Guleri and Shama Guleri 'Keep Rising' Merit Scholarship." The scholarship, named after Guleri's mother and late father, will fund the education of eight economically-disadvantaged students.

== See also ==
- List of venture capital firms
