= Sunil Saigal =

American engineer

- Education: Punjab Engineering College; Indian Institute of Science; Purdue University

Sunil Saigal (Hindi: सुनील सैगल), is an Indian-born American engineer.

== Education ==
Saigal obtained his bachelor's degree (Civil Engineering) at Punjab Engineering College, Chandigarh, India in 1978, obtaining a masters in Structures from Indian Institute of Science in 1980, and obtained his PhD in 1985 from Purdue University.

== Career ==
Sunil Saigal is a distinguished professor and a former dean of the Newark College of Engineering at New Jersey Institute of Technology.

Saigal's research has been focused on interactions with the industry and these contributions have included:

- development of boundary element shape optimization in collaboration with United Technologies
- formulations for powder packing in collaboration with Alcoa and DuPont
- development of computational models for nonlinear soil behaviour in collaboration with ANSYS
- cohesive element formulations for post crack behaviour of glass—polymer composites in collaboration with DuPont
- explicit algorithms for high velocity impact in collaboration with Naval Surface Warfare Center
- computational simulations of acetabular hip component to assist with total hip replacement surgery in a collaboration with University of Pittsburgh Medical Center
- development of medial surface algorithms in collaboration with Sandia National Laboratories.

== Awards ==
- Fellow of American Society of Mechanical Engineers (ASME).
- Fellow of American Society of Civil Engineers (ASCE)
- Fellow of American Association for the Advancement of Science (AAAS).
- Orr Award for best paper, ASME Materials Division, 2004.
- Who's Who in America, 57th Edition, November 2002.
- Richard Teare Award for Excellence in Engineering Education, Carnegie Institute of Technology, Carnegie Mellon University, 1996.
- Outstanding Professor of the Year, ASCE Pittsburgh Section, 1994.
- George Tallman Ladd Research Award, Carnegie Mellon University, 1990.
- Presidential Young Investigator Award, National Science Foundation, 1990-1995.
- Ralph R. Teetor Award, Society of Automotive Engineers, 1988.
- The Admiral Ralph Earle Medal, Worcester Engineer Society, 1987.
