= K. K. Aggarwal =

Indian academic

- Born: 1948 (age 77–78)
- Education: Punjab Engineering College; Kurukshetra University
- Engineering career
- Projects: Reliability Analysis
- Awards: The Sir Thomas Ward Memorial Award by the Institution of Engineers; Life Time Achievement Medal by the India International Friendship Society

K. K. Aggarwal (born 1948) is an engineer and professor who has worked in the fields of computer engineering and information technology. He has been the president of the South Asian University (a university established by SAARC nations) since December 2023. He was the founding vice chancellor of the Guru Gobind Singh Indraprastha University (1998 – 2008) and founder chancellor of K R Mangalam University in Gurgaon (2013 - 2018). He was the president of the Computer Society of India from 2007 to 2009 and vice president of the South East Asia Regional Computer Confederation from 2008 to 2009 and then as the president for a year afterwards. He has also been the chairman of the National Board of Accreditation, India (2018 – 2022) and the chairman of the board of governors for Malaviya National Institute of Technology (MNIT) Jaipur (2012 – 2015). He was Pro Vice-Chancellor of Guru Jambheshwar University (Technical University of Haryana) during 1995 – 1998. Aggarwal was also president of the Institution of Electronics and Telecommunication Engineers (IETE) during the period 2002 – 2004.

== Academic life ==
Aggarwal obtained his engineering degree in electronics and communication from Punjab Engineering College, then under Panjab University in 1968 and M.Sc.-engineering in advanced electronics from the Kurukshetra University in 1971. He got his Ph.D. from the Kurukshetra University with a thesis on "Reliability Evaluation and Optimization" in 1975, in the same year he became a professor. Aggarwal has worked in various fields of electronics and computer engineering and published several papers. He has written books on reliability engineering and software engineering.
