= SuperCam =

Instruments on the Perseverance Mars rover

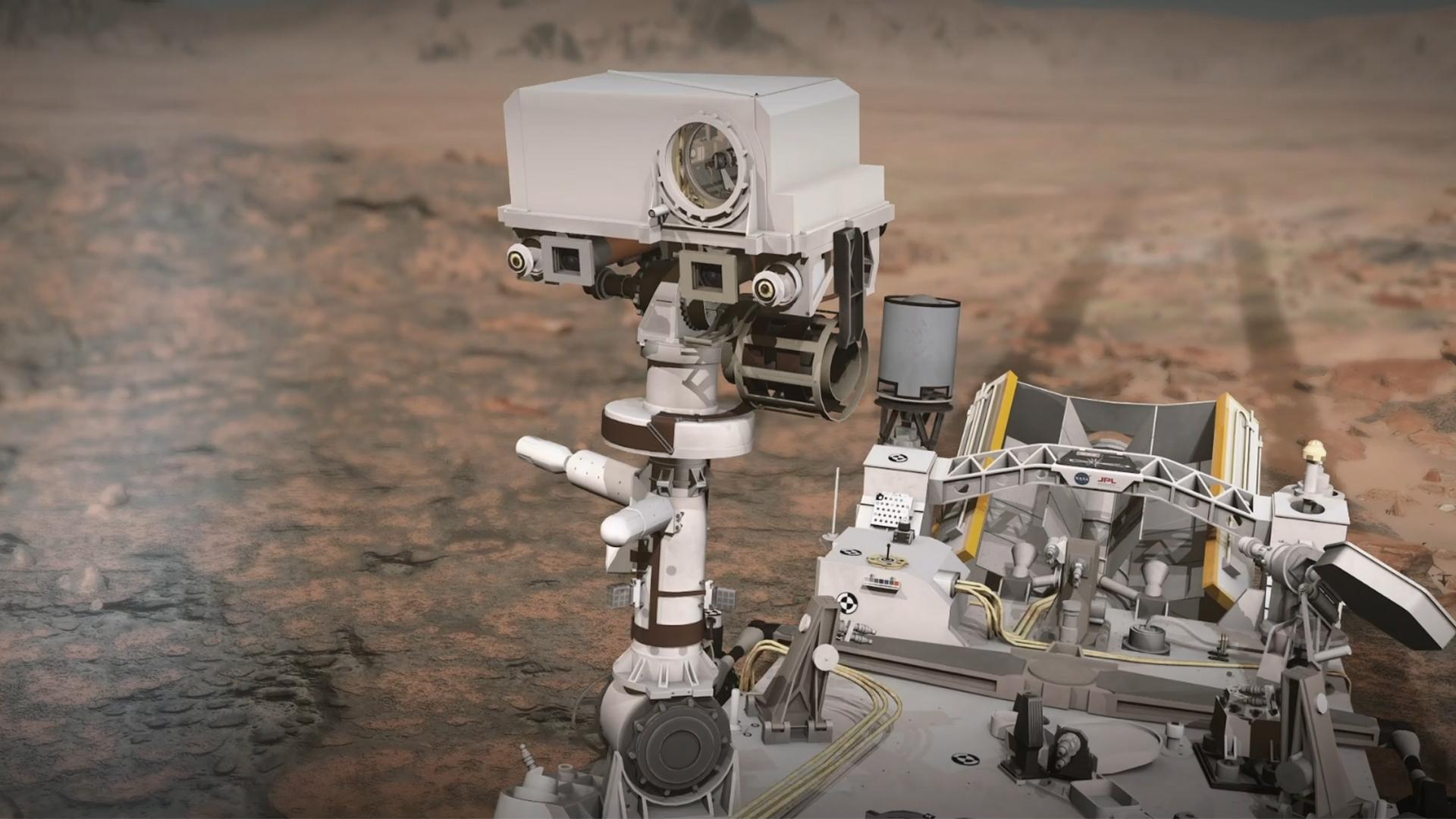
SuperCAM on the Mars Perseverance rover

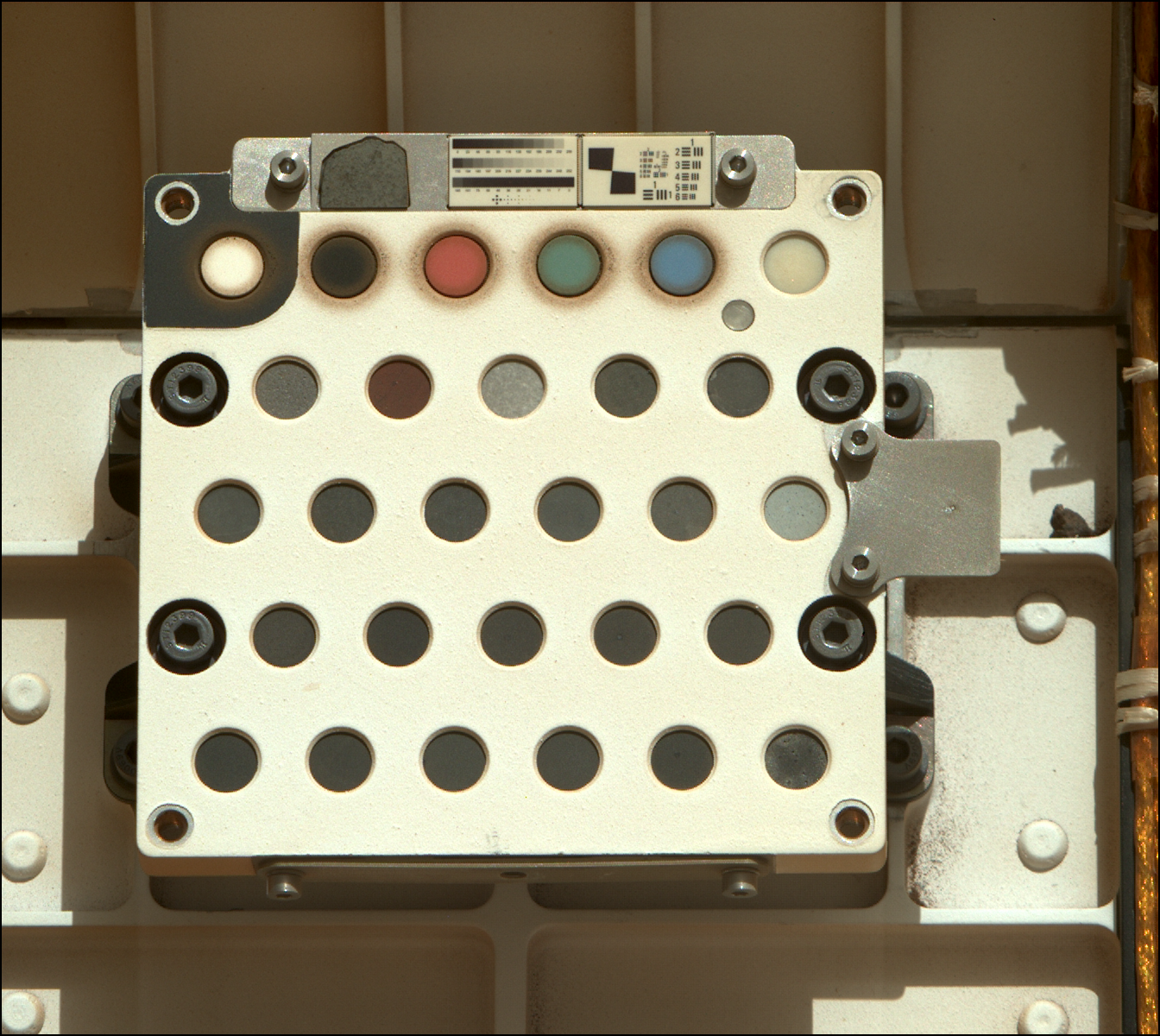
SuperCam Calibration Target with Mars Meteorite in the top of the plate

SuperCam is a suite of remote-sensing instruments for the Mars 2020 Perseverance rover mission that performs remote analyses of rocks and soils with a camera, two lasers and four spectrometers to seek organic compounds that could hold biosignatures of past microbial life on Mars, if it ever existed there.

SuperCam was developed in collaboration between the Research Institute in Astrophysics and Planetology (IRAP) of the University of Toulouse in France, the French Space Agency (CNES), Los Alamos National Laboratory, the University of Valladolid (Spain), the University of Hawaii and the Universities of Basque Country and Málaga in Spain. The Principal Investigator is Roger Wiens from Los Alamos National Laboratory. SuperCam is an improved version of the successful ChemCam instruments of the Curiosity rover that have been upgraded with two different lasers and detectors. SuperCam is used in conjunction with the AEGIS (Autonomous Exploration for Gathering Increased Science) targeting system, a program which Vandi Verma, NASA roboticist and engineer, helped develop.

In April 2018, SuperCam entered the final stages of assembly and testing. The flight model was installed to the rover in June 2019. The rover mission was launched on 30 July 2020.

== Instruments ==
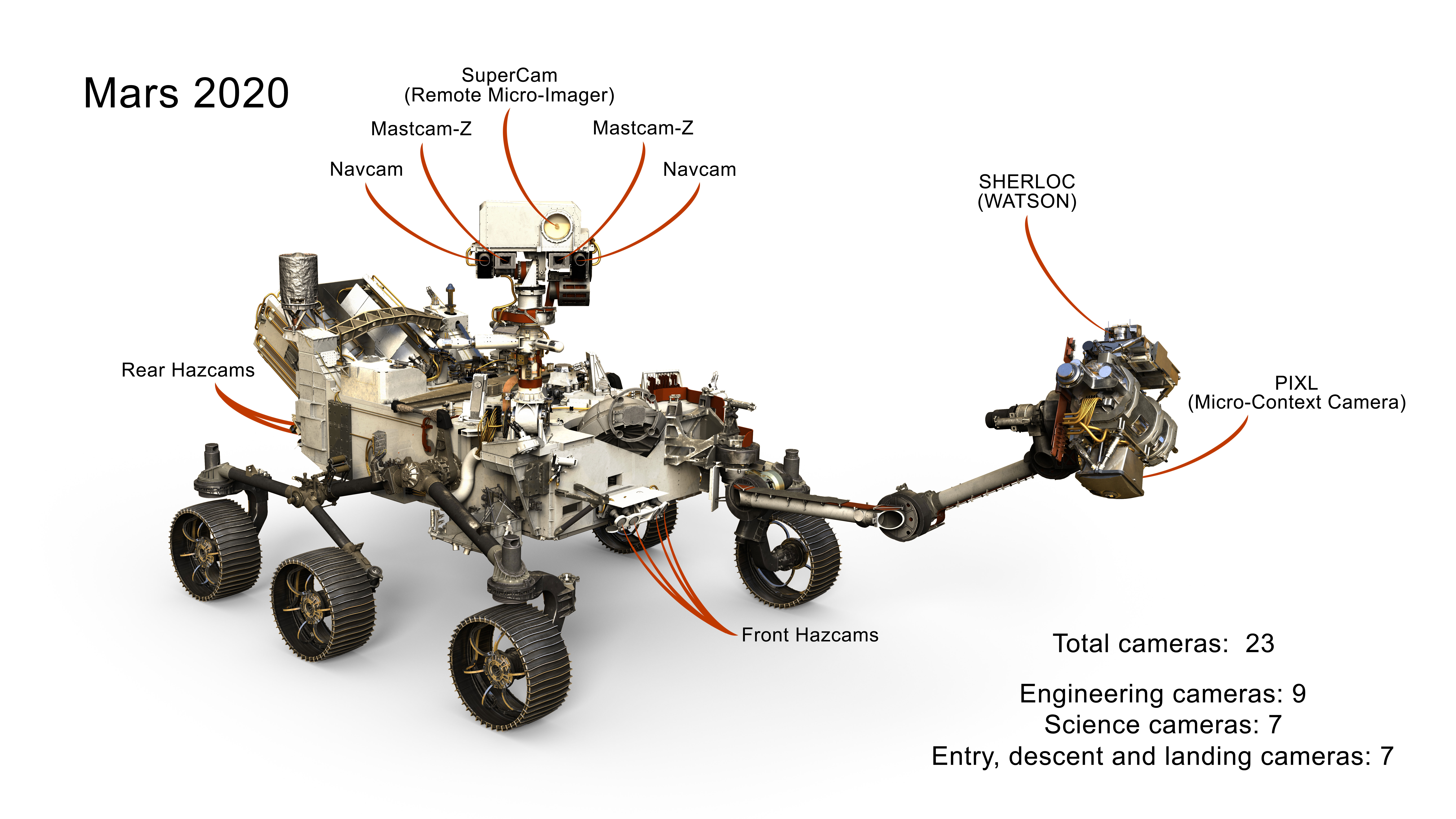
SuperCAM is on the end of the Perseverance rover's Mast

SuperCam	Units/performance
Location	Mast (electronics and spectrometers are inside the deck)
Mass	10.4 kg (23 lb)
Power	17.9 watts
Dimensions	Approx. 38 cm × 24 cm × 19 cm
Data return	15.5 megabits per experiment
Maximum working distance	Red laser (LIBS): 7 m Green laser (Raman): 12 m

For measurements of chemical composition, the instrument suite uses a version of the successful ChemCam instruments of the Curiosity rover that have been upgraded with two different lasers and detectors. SuperCam's instruments are able to identify the kinds of chemicals that could be evidence of past life on Mars. SuperCam is a suite of various instruments, and the collection of correlated measurements on a target can be used to determine directly the geochemistry and mineralogy of samples.

The suite has several integrated instruments: Raman spectroscopy, time-resolved fluorescence (TRF) spectroscopy, and Visible and InfraRed (VISIR) reflectance spectroscopy to provide preliminary information about the mineralogy and molecular structure of samples under consideration, as well as being able to directly measure organic compounds. The total is four complementary spectrometers, making the suite sensitive enough to measure trace amounts of chemicals.

=== LIBS ===
SuperCam rocks (AEGIS targeted)

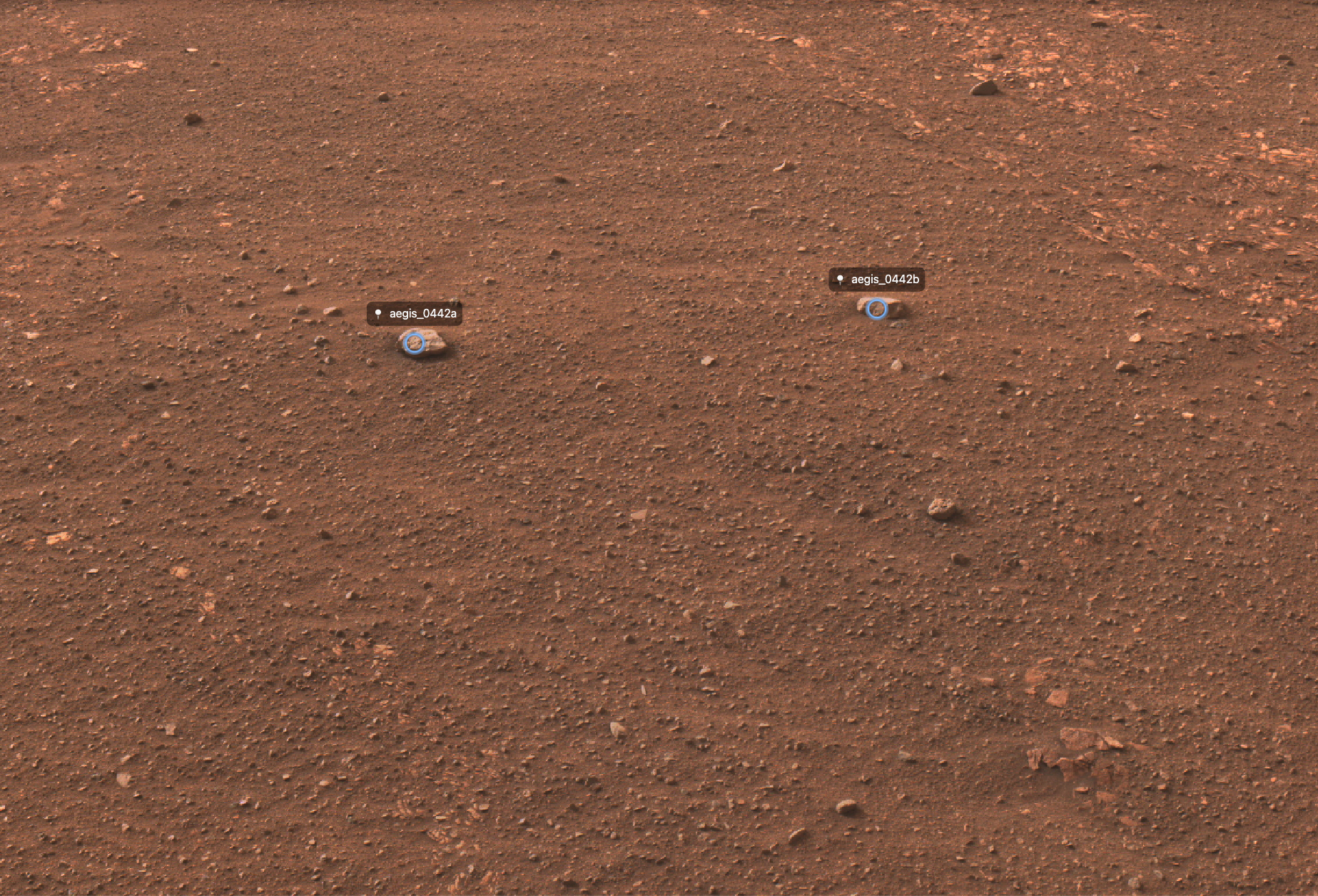
Context view

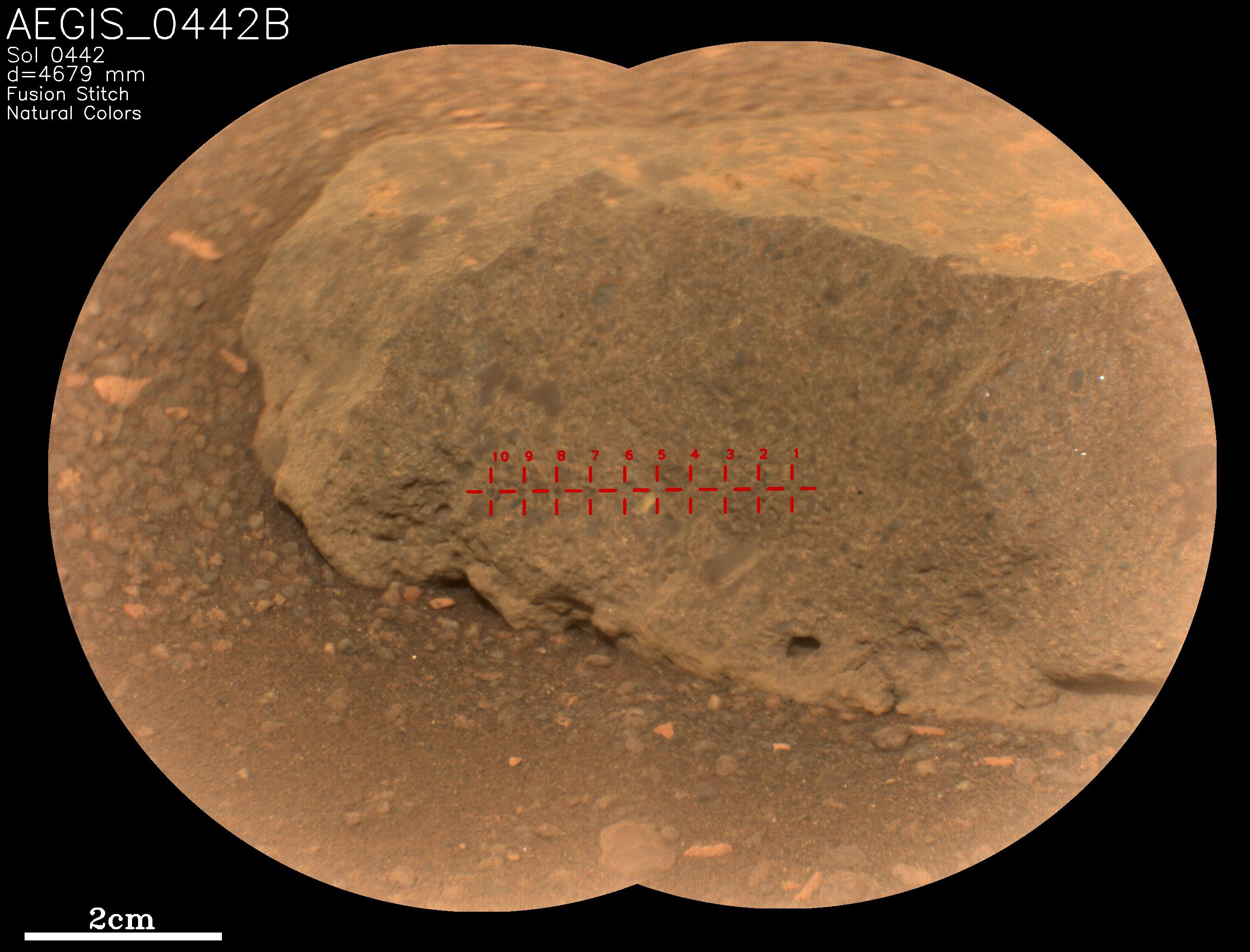
Target rock: "AEGIS_0442B"

The remote laser-induced breakdown spectroscopy (LIBS) system emits a 1064-nm laser beam to investigate targets as small as a grain of rice from a distance of more than 7 meters, allowing the rover to study targets beyond the reach of its arm. The beam vaporizes a tiny amount of rock, creating a hot plasma. SuperCam then measures the colors of light in the plasma, which provide clues to the target's elemental composition. Its laser is also capable of remotely clearing away surface dust, giving all of its instruments a clear view of the targets. LIBS unit contains three spectrometers. Two of these handle the visible and violet portion of the VISIR spectra, while the IR portion is recorded in the mast.

=== Raman spectroscopy ===
SuperCam's Raman spectrometer (at 532 nm) investigates targets up to 12 m from the rover. In the Raman spectroscopy technique, most of the green laser light reflects back at the same wavelength that was sent, but a small fraction of the light interacts with the target molecules, changing the wavelength in proportion to the vibrational energy of the molecular bonds. By spectrally observing the returned Raman light, the identity of the minerals can be determined.

=== IR spectrometer ===
The infrared spectrometer, provided by France, operates in the near-infrared (1.3 to 2.6 micrometers) wavelengths and its photodiodes, or detectors, are cooled by small thermoelectric coolers to ensure that they operate between −100 °C and −50 °C at all times. This instrument will analyze many of the clay minerals and help unravel the history of liquid water on Mars. The types of clay minerals and their abundances give clues about the nature of the water that was present, whether fresh or salty, acidic or neutral pH, whether it might have been icy or warm, and whether the water was present for a long period of time. These are key questions to understand how habitable the surface environment was in the distant past.

=== Camera/telescope/microphone ===
SuperCam's optical camera acquires high-resolution color images of samples under study, which also help determine the surface geology. This camera can also study how atmospheric water and dust absorb or reflect solar radiation, which may help to develop weather forecasts. SuperCam is also equipped with a microphone to capture the first audio recordings from the surface of Mars. The microphone is the same model (Knowles Corp EK) as the ones that flew to Mars on the 1998 Mars Polar Lander and the 2007 Phoenix lander. However, neither mission was able to record sounds.

=== Spectrometers ===
The detectors of all four spectrometers are cooled to just below 0 °C by thermoelectric coolers. The photodiodes for the infrared (IR) spectrometer are further cooled to between −100 °C and −50 °C at all times.

SuperCam
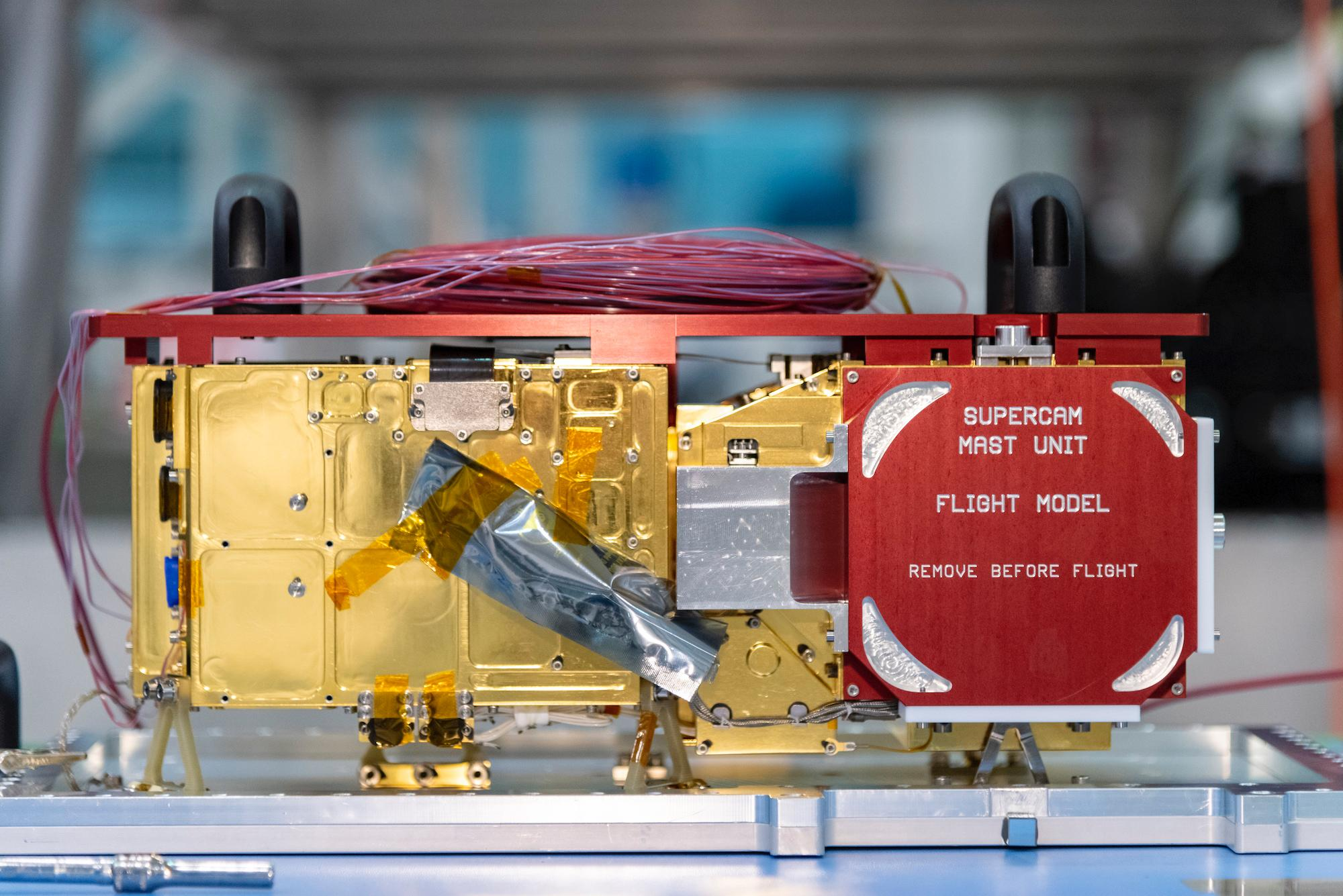

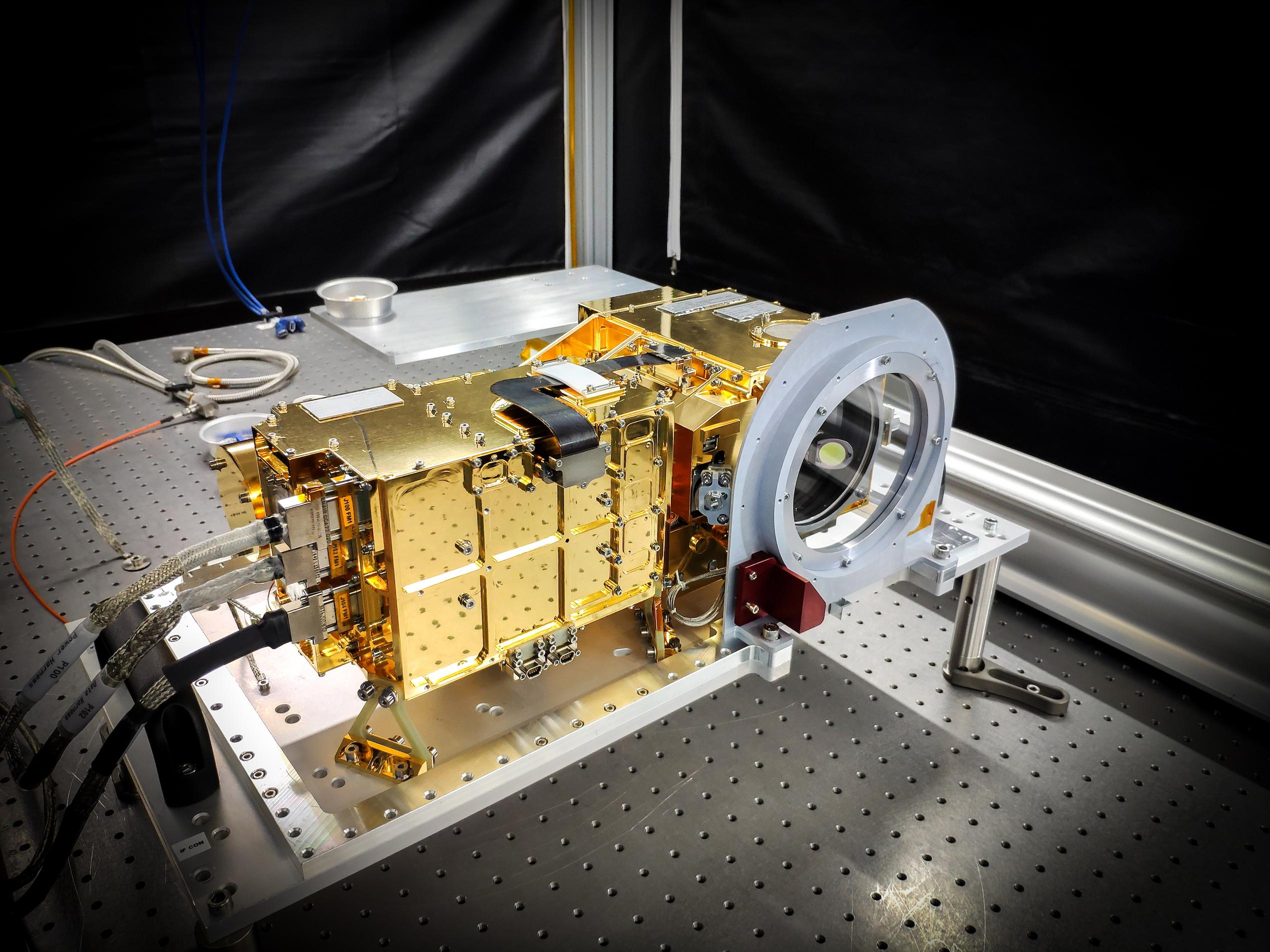
Mast Unit

Spectrometer	Ultraviolet region	Violet region	Visible region	Infrared (IR) region
Type	Czerny-Turner	Czerny-Turner	Transmission	Acousto-Optic Tunable Filters (AOTF)
Location	Body	Body	Body	Mast
Function	LIBS	LIBS, and VISIR (visible and IR)	Raman, LIBS, VISIR	VISIR
Detector	CCD	CCD	ICCD	Photodiode
Range (nm)	240–340	385–475	535–855	1300–2600
Nbr. channels	2048	2048	6000	256
Resolution	0.20 nm	0.20 nm	0.3–0.4 nm	30/cm
Field of view	0.7 mrad	0.7 mrad	0.7 mrad	1.15 mrad
