= G. K. Chadha =

Indian economist

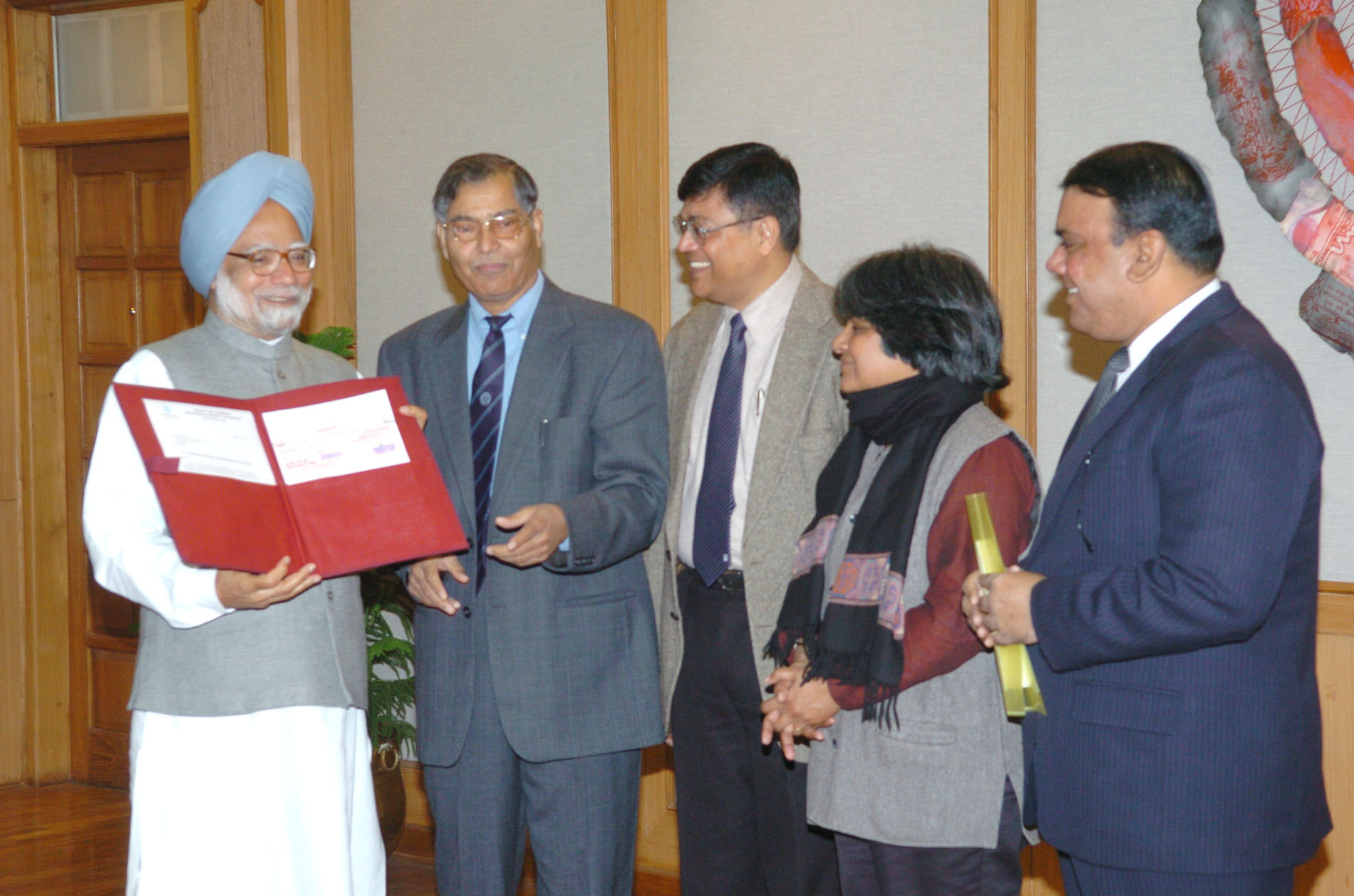
The VC, JNU Prof. G.K.Chadha presenting a cheque to the Prime Minister Dr. Manmohan Singh towards PMNRF in New Delhi on February 4, 2005

Prof. Gopal Krishna Chadha (1940 - 2014) was an Indian economist and academician for more than 40 years. He was the founding President of South Asian University, New Delhi. South Asian University was established in 2010 by the eight governments of South Asian Association for Regional Cooperation (SAARC). He authored 16 books besides contributing 98 research papers to national and international research journals on various development issues relating to India and other developing countries of Asia, notably South-Asia, Indonesia and China.

== Career ==
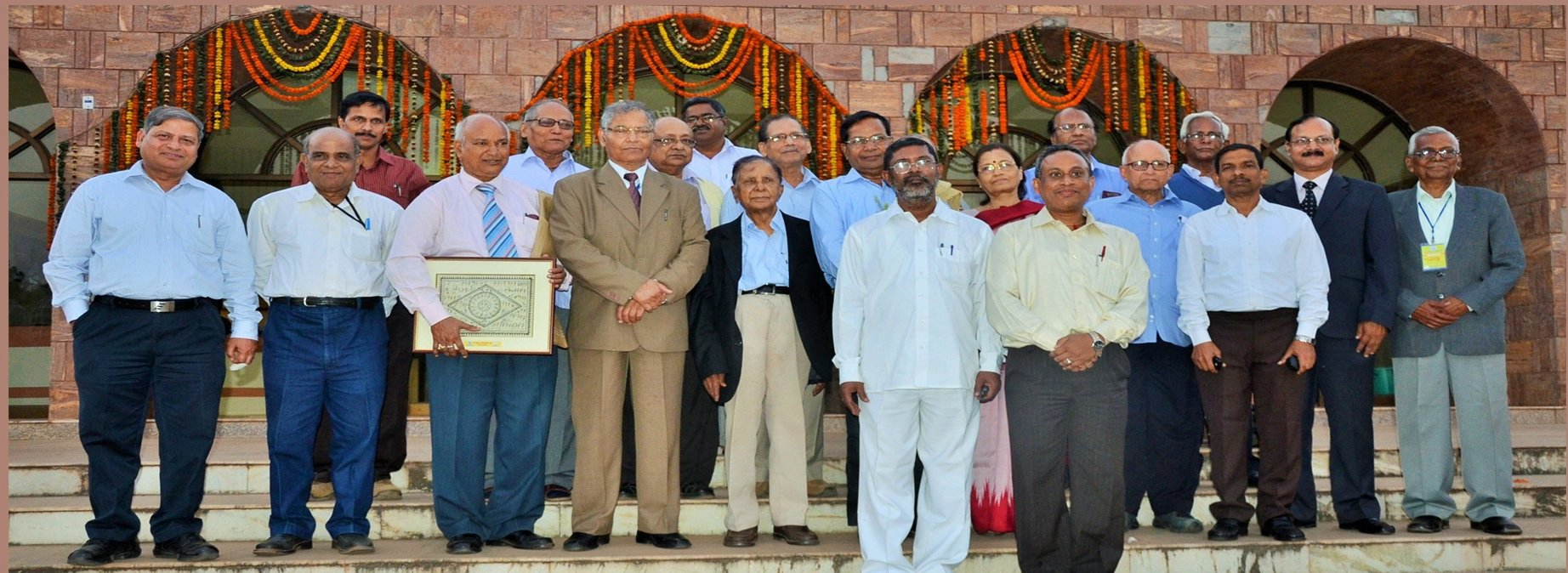
At the 45th annual conference of the Orissa Economics Association

From 2004 to 2009, Chadha served as a member of the Economic Advisory Council to the Prime Minister of India. The UGC Committee to Review the Pay Scales and Services Conditions of Indian University and College Teachers was also headed by him. He had been a visiting fellow at Institute of Development Studies, University of Sussex, England and a visiting research fellow at Institute of Developing Economies, Tokyo. He used to be a visiting professor at University of Mauritius and an Honorary Professor at Shenzhen University, China and Nihon Fukushi University, Nagoya-Japan. He was also a member of the International Advisory Board of the Centre for Development Research, Colombo. He was also a Consultant to several international organizations including United Nations agencies such as FAO, ILO, UNCTAD and ESCAP, besides serving on numerous other international and national expert committees. He had been honored with numerous awards and distinctions for his contribution in the field of education including D. Litt Degree (honoriscausa) conferred by Panjab University, Chandigarh and Mysore University, Mysore, and Doctor of Letters by Pondicherry University, Puducherry. He was elected as the President of the Indian Economic Association. Earlier, he was the President of the Indian Society of Agricultural Economics as well the Indian Society of Labour Economics. A festschrift was published in his honor: Reforming Indian agriculture towards employment generation and poverty reduction : essays in honour of G.K. Chadha According to WorldCat, the book is held in 610 libraries

== Illness and death ==
He died at 73 of a sudden heart attack on the morning of March 1, 2014 in New Delhi.
