= South Asian University =

International university

- Motto: Knowledge without borders
- Type: International university Public research university central university
- Established: 2010; 16 years ago
- Founder: SAARC
- Parent institution: SAARC
- Affiliations: Recognised by all SAARC Countries
- Budget: ₹448.13 crore (US$54.07 Million)
- President: K. K. Aggarwal
- Students: 1500+
- Location: South Delhi,Delhi, India; 28.485°N 77.198°E
- Campus: Urban, 100 acres
- Website: sau.int

South Asian University (SAU) is an international university sponsored by the eight Member States of the South Asian Association for Regional Cooperation (SAARC). The eight countries are Afghanistan, Bangladesh, Bhutan, India, Maldives, Nepal, Pakistan, and Sri Lanka. The university started admitting students in 2010 at a temporary campus at Akbar Bhawan, India. Since February 2023, the university is running on its permanent campus at Maidan Garhi in South Delhi, India, next to Indira Gandhi National Open University (IGNOU).

== History ==
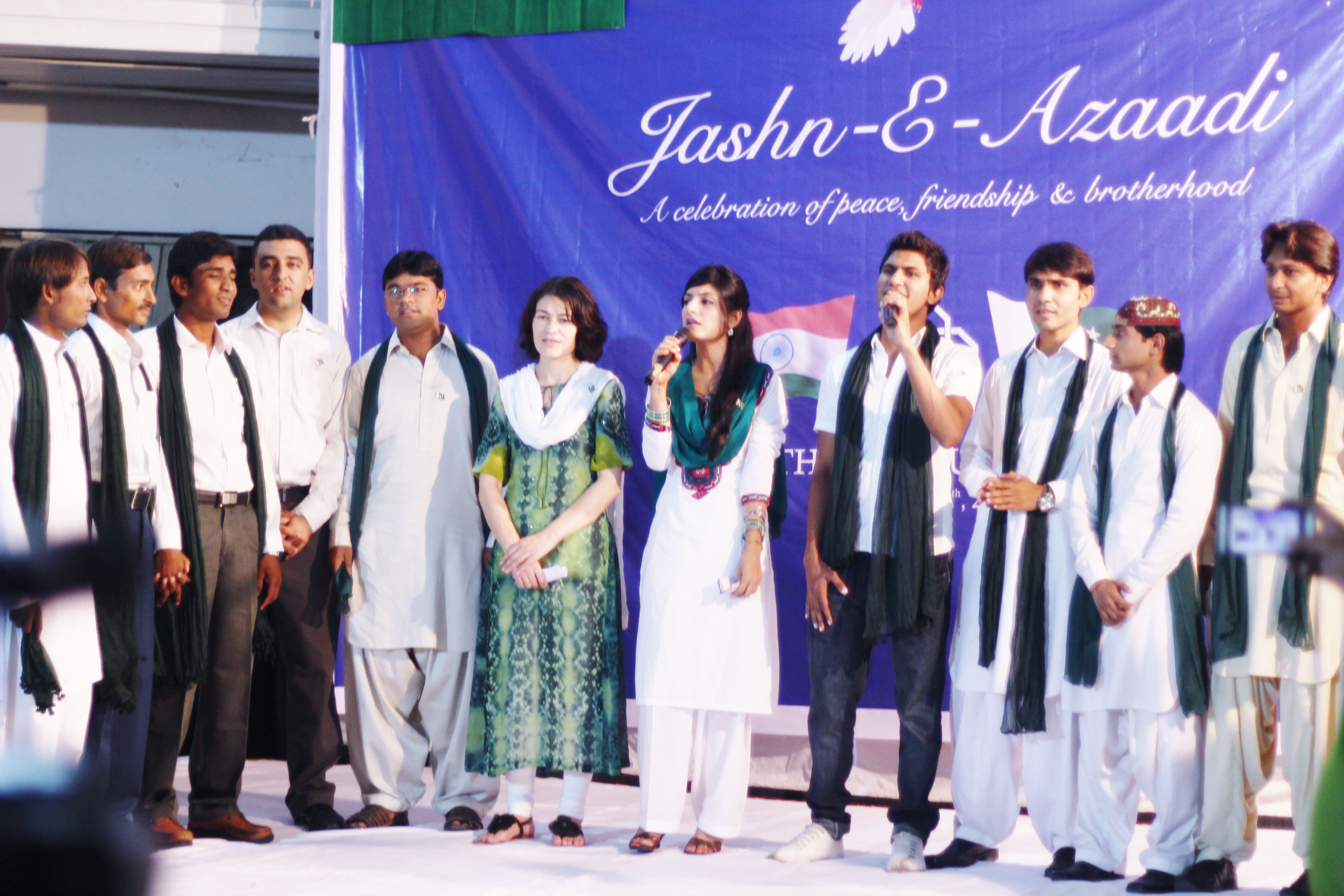
Students on joint India and Pakistan Independence Day Celebration

At the 13th SAARC Summit held in Dhaka in November 2005, Indian Prime Minister Manmohan Singh proposed the establishment of a South Asian University to provide world-class facilities and professional faculty to students and researchers from SAARC member countries. The "Inter-governmental Agreement for the Establishment of the South Asian University" was signed at the 14th SAARC Summit. The SAARC member states also decided that the university would be established in India. Professor Gopal Krishna Chadha, Prime Minister's Economic Advisory Council member and former vice-chancellor of Jawaharlal Nehru University, was formally appointed the CEO of the project and first President.

India provides the majority of funds, around US$239.93 million, for the foundation of the university, which is around 79 per cent of the total cost of the full establishment of the university until 2014. As of 2018, Pakistan had cleared most of its dues payable. As of 2023, all the member countries other than India have defaulted on paying the dues.

The first academic session of the university started in August 2010, with two post-graduate academic programmes in Economics and Computer Science. As of 2023, SAU offered Master's and MPhil/PhD programs in Applied Mathematics, Biotechnology, Computer Science, Economics, International Relations, Legal Studies and Sociology. The degrees of the university are recognized by all the member nations of the SAARC according to an inter-governmental agreement signed by the foreign ministers of the eight SAARC member states.

South Asian University predominantly attracts students from the eight SAARC countries, although students from other continents also attend. There is a country quota system for the admission of students. SAU conducts admission tests annually at various centres in eight countries.

== Campus ==
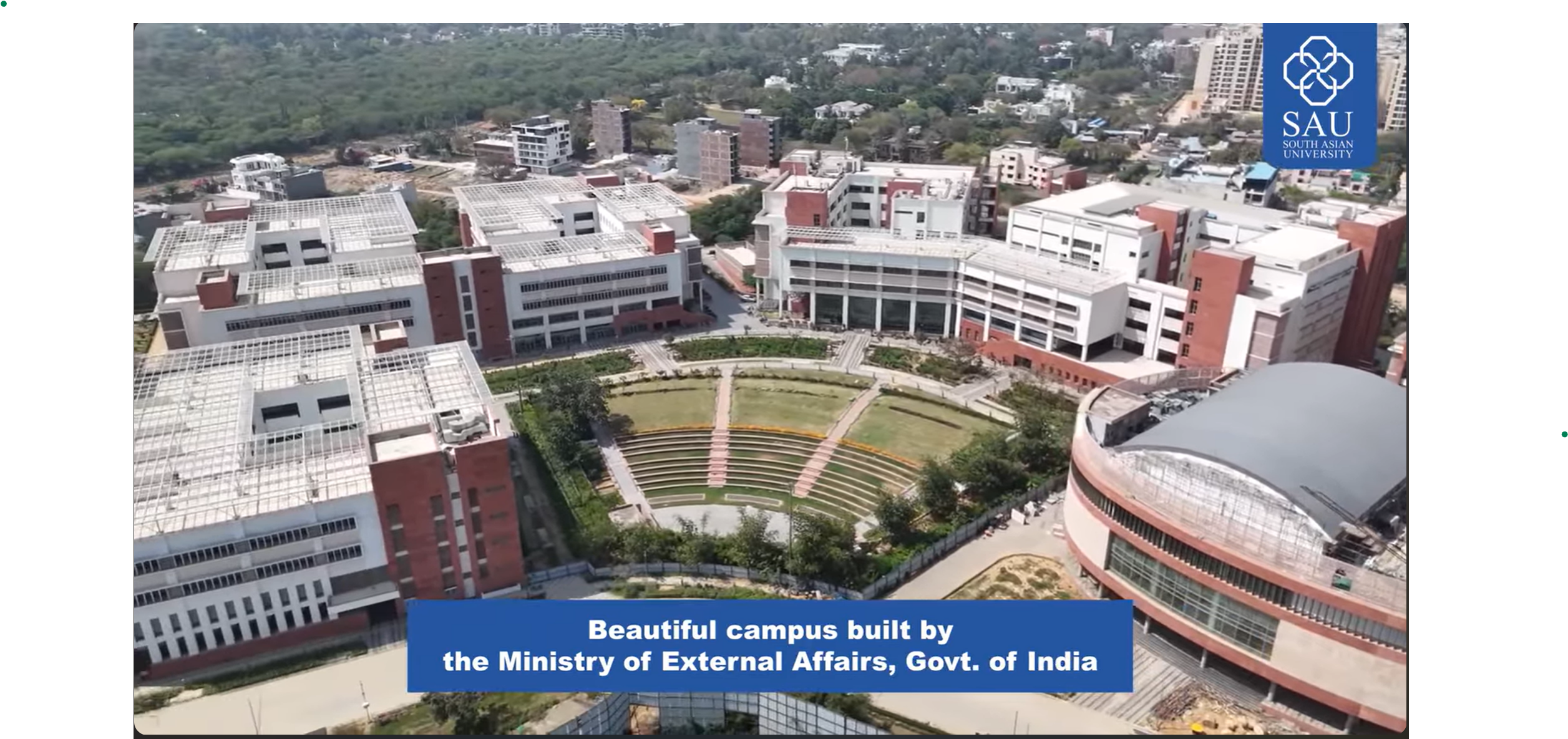
South Asian University's campus at Maidan Garhi, Delhi

The campus of South Asian University is at Maidan Garhi, adjacent to IGNOU and Asola Wildlife Sanctuary. The Master Layout Plan of this 100-acre campus houses faculty buildings, hostels, playgrounds, residential apartments and a club. The construction was completed by 2022–23.

== Organization and administration ==
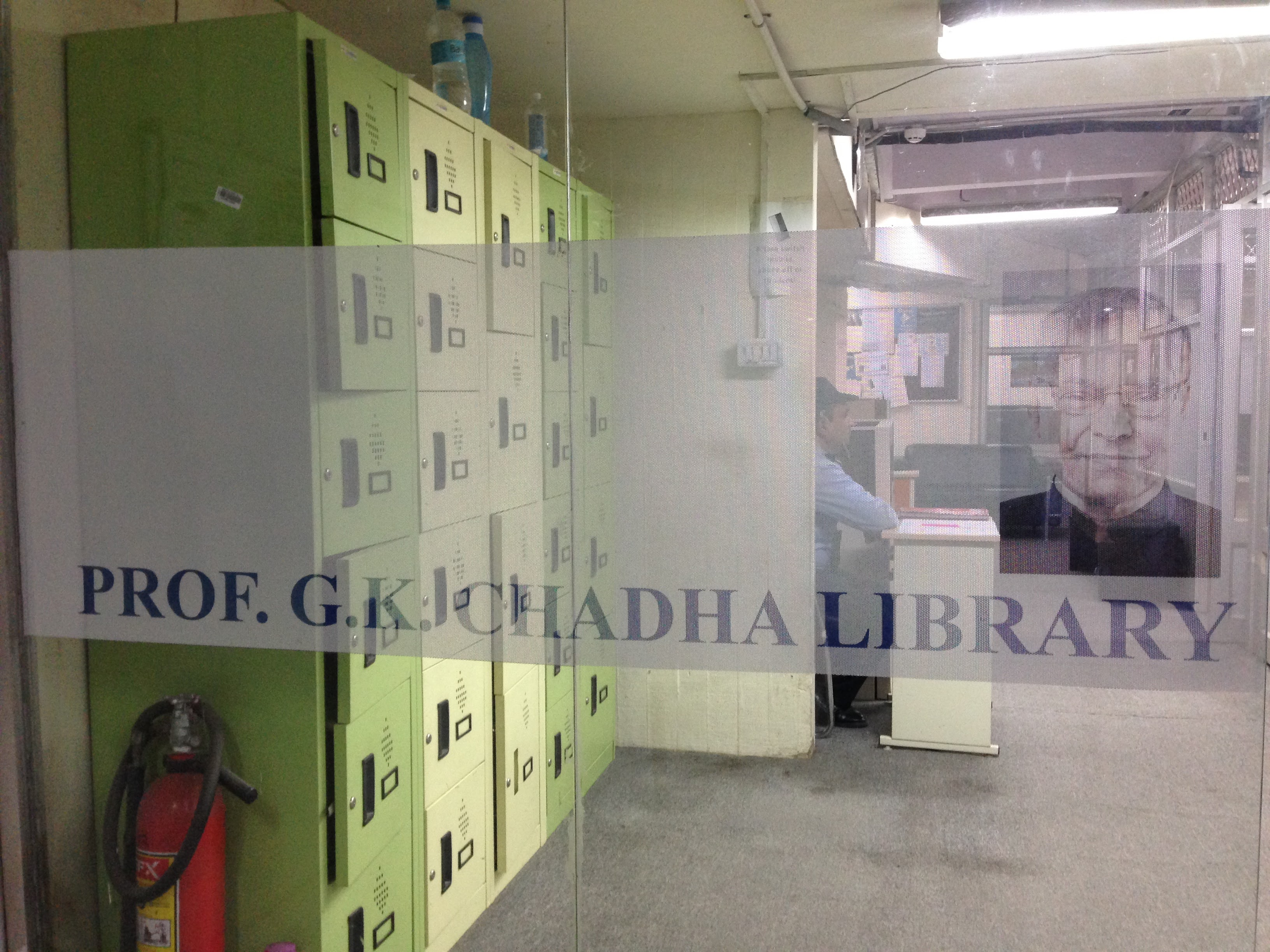
Prof. G. K. Chadha Library, part of the university

The founding President of the university, Gopal Krishna Chadha, died on 1 March 2014. On 3 November 2014, Dr. Kavita Sharma took charge as the President of the university. She retired in November 2019. A.V.S. Ramesh Chandra was appointed as acting president. He was followed by Ranjan Kumar Mohanty, who is the last acting president. Currently, on 27 December 2023, After four-year wait, K. K. Aggarwal fills South Asian University president's post

The decision-making bodies of South Asian University comprise the Governing Board, the Executive Council, the Academic Council, and the Finance Committee.

== Controversy ==
In July 2025, the university was involved in a disciplinary controversy after a student, Sudeepto Niloy, was expelled following a dispute in the student mess over food restrictions during the Maha Shivratri festival. Members of a right-wing student outfit had attempted to forcibly stop the serving of non-vegetarian food, leading to a physical altercation when Das intervened. The action prompted widespread public debates about campus discipline and freedom of expression at the institution.

Das subsequently challenged the expulsion by filing a writ petition in the Delhi High Court under Article 226 of the Indian Constitution. The university administration contested the petition, arguing that as an international organization established by an inter-governmental SAARC agreement, it enjoyed sovereign immunity and was not amenable to the writ jurisdiction of Indian courts.

In early 2026, the Delhi High Court granted interim relief to the petitioner, allowing Das to return and continue his Ph.D. program. Relying on landmark judicial precedents, including the Supreme Court ruling in Ranjit Thakur v. Union of India, Justice Jasmeet Singh observed that the administrative action of complete lifetime expulsion was prima facie unreasonable, vindictive, and shockingly disproportionate to the alleged offense. The court noted that disciplinary punishments must suit the offender and allow a chance for self-reform rather than completely destroying an academic career. The matter remains pending final adjudication regarding the university's ultimate jurisdictional accountability.

Previous incidents include protests in 2022 over the reduction of student stipends, which resulted in police intervention and disciplinary actions against several students and faculty members. Associate professor Snehashish Bhattacharya was suspended and later terminated in 2023, a move that teachers' associations criticized as an attack on academic freedom. Following a prolonged dispute, the university formally terminated Bhattacharya's services in September 2025, backdating the termination to his initial 2023 suspension date.

In 2024, Sri Lankan sociologist Sasanka Perera and one of his students left the university after receiving disciplinary notices over a thesis that included an interview with linguist Noam Chomsky critical of the Indian government.

=== The Jurisdictional Dispute and MEA Filing ===
Bhattacharya and other affected faculty members challenged their disciplinary actions by filing writ petitions in the Delhi High Court under Article 226 of the Indian Constitution. A single-judge bench initially dismissed the petitions in January 2024, ruling that SAU—as an international organization established via an intergovernmental SAARC agreement—did not qualify as a "State" instrumentality under Article 12 and was therefore immune to domestic writ jurisdiction.

Bhattacharya and fellow petitioners appealed the verdict before a division bench of the Delhi High Court, vigorously disputing SAU's claim of blanket legal immunity. The petitioners argued that because the university is heavily funded by public money (with the Indian government providing the land and over 50% of capital funding) and performs a distinct public function by imparting higher education within India, it must be held legally accountable under domestic law. They asserted that denying writ jurisdiction would render SAU an institution completely devoid of domestic legal remedy for human rights and employment violations.

The ongoing legal standoff prompted the Delhi High Court to seek a formal stance from the Government of India. In subsequent submissions to the court, the Ministry of External Affairs (MEA) clarified the extent of the university's privileges. The Ministry's position notes that while SAU as an institution and its diplomatic officials enjoy standard privileges and immunities regarding local taxation, customs, and property search, this does not automatically grant the administration absolute, blanket immunity from Indian judicial review in matters concerning fundamental rights, arbitrary student expulsions, or unlawful staff terminations. The High Court continues to deliberate on this critical boundary between international organizational autonomy and the constitutional rights of individuals working and studying within Indian borders.
