= Shalabh Kumar =

Indian-American businessman

Shalli Kumar
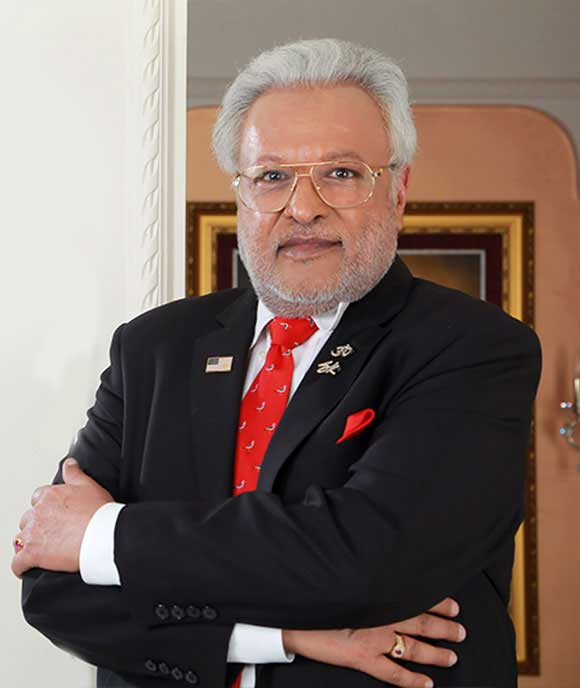
- Born: 24 December 1948 (age 77); Ambala, East Punjab, India
- Education: Panjab University; Punjab Engineering College; Illinois Institute of Technology
- Occupation: Chair of AVG Advanced Technologies
- Political party: Republican

Shalabh "Shalli" Kumar (Hindi: शलभ कुमार; born 24 December 1948) is a Chicago-based Indian-American industrialist and political donor affiliated with the Republican Party. Kumar was a prominent financial backer of Donald Trump's presidential campaign in the 2016 election.

== Early and personal life ==
Kumar was born in Ambala, in the state of Haryana, India, and graduated from Punjab Engineering College, Chandigarh with a BS in electronics engineering in 1969 and was a recipient of its prestigious Gold Medal. He came to the United States as a foreign student when he was 20, to attend Illinois Institute of Technology for his master's degree.

Kumar's son, Vikram Kumar, married Indian-born Miss Earth India Pooja Chitgopekar in 2007. She migrated to New Zealand with her parents in 2009, where she married Vikram Kumar in January 2011. It featured 9 helicopters forming a groom's party also called a baraat in the Hindu wedding tradition, and music lasting three days featuring Daler Mehndi, RDB Rhythm Dhol Bass of Canada and UK, and Signature (dance group) from UK of Britain's Got Talent fame. Kumar described the 9 helicopter “Barat” as an invention, the AVG way.

Mr. Kumar’s full biography is written in a book titled “Ab Ki Baar Trump Sarker” published in April 2017. Many news articles describe him to be a self-made very successful inventor and a billionaire industrialist.

== Career ==
In 1975 he founded the AVG Group of Companies, which designs and manufactures electronic components and products used in a variety of industries such as automation and telecommunications. With headquarters in Chicago, AVG Group has operations all over the world. Life Made Ezee Technologies, Pvt. Ltd. is a division of AVG Group that provides home automation solutions in India, and is based in Bangalore, India. All these products are manufactured in USA and sold worldwide.

Additionally, Kumar has served as president or CEO of Circuit International Incorporated, Microfast Controls Corporation, Electronic Support Systems, PEC Reliance, Lika Tandy Corporation, Mc Technologies, and Hi-Tech Systems Corporation. Kumar has also been employed with Nanofast Incorporated and National Controls Corporation.

== Political activities ==
Kumar said he was approached by Nikki Haley's father Ajit Singh Randhawa in the summer of 2010 to support his daughter's campaign to run for governor of South Carolina; Kumar became the largest donor for the Haley campaign.

Right after Bin Laden was found hiding in Pakistan, during 2011 and 2012, Kumar became an active citizen lobbyist on Capitol Hill to support Texas Congressman Ted Poe's bill to cut off foreign aid to Pakistan. The Bill passed in August 2012.

=== National Indian American Public Policy Institute (NIAPPI) ===
Subsequently, Kumar founded the National Indian American Public Policy Institute (NIAPPI), a think tank focusing on issues relevant to Indian Americans. In 2013, NIAPPI and Kumar took Chairwoman of House Republican Conference Cathy McMorris Rodgers, Congressman Aaron Schock, and Congresswoman Cynthia Lummis to visit the then-Chief Minister of the Indian state of Gujarat and future Indian Prime Minister Narendra Modi and invite him to the United States. This Congressional visit, which came at a time where Modi was banned from entering the United States, ended his isolation from U.S. lawmakers and helped Modi establish relationships with US lawmakers.

TV media at that time characterized this visit as a boost to propel Modi as the front runner for the post of Prime Minister of India. Working with Congressman Pete Sessions, Chairman of the Rules Committee of the US Congress, Kumar has sought to recruit Indian-Americans Republicans to run for Congress. The Sessions/Kumar project resulted in two Indian Americans running as Republican candidates in the 2014 elections.

In 2014, Kumar worked with the National Republican Congressional Committee (NRCC) to encourage Indian Americans to run for office and get involved politically. He was also named Chairman of the Indian American Advisory Council for the House Republican Conference.

Kumar has organized meetings between American and Indian politicians. He has described Modi as his idol. The Hindustan Times has pronounced Kumar as the Punjabi Tycoon, the biggest supporter of Modi in US.

Kumar and Newt Gingrich, former speaker of the House, worked together closely in the early eighties and from 2011 onward. Kumar ran the Gingrich Presidential Campaign in Scott County, Iowa in 2012.

Mr. Kumar has worked closely with Steve Bannon, former CEO of Trump 2016 campaign as well as the white house in 2017. Mr. Bannon as Chairman of Breitbart had supported Mr. Kumar in his efforts to lift the Modi visa ban. Steve Bannon, Chairman Pete Sessions and Mr. Kumar coined the phrase for Narendra Modi as “Ronald Reagan of India”.

=== Donald Trump's 2016 Presidential campaign ===
In July 2016, Kumar became a public supporter of the Republican candidate Donald Trump's candidacy in the 2016 Presidential Election, emerging as one of the biggest donors. Kumar cited Trump's stance on Pakistan and Radical Islam, namely Trump's plan to profile Muslim Immigrants. Kumar also lauded Newt Gingrich's calls for increased scrutiny of American Muslims and increased surveillance against mosques in the United States. The Hill quoted Kumar specifically as saying: "The policy setting is that we need to have a lot of scrutiny. I totally agree with former Speaker Newt Gingrich: Mosques should be monitored completely, vetting should be taking place.... I am totally for profiling. If you need to profile, what is the fuss?"

Mr. Kumar founded the Republican Hindu Coalition (RHC) in November 2015. Senate Majority Leader Mitch McConnell and former Speaker Newt Gingrich along with dozens of US senators and congressmen headlined the inauguration event. RHC formally endorsed the Presidency of Donald J. Trump in July 2016. It organized a massive rally of Hindu Americans on Oct. 15, 2016 in Edison NJ, three weeks before the election where candidate Trump met with RHC leaders and addressed the gathering. “We love Trump” placards could be seen throughout the crowd. The RHC created three television ads, which were aired on Indian networks in the final three weeks of the presidential campaign. The RHC also executed a direct mail campaign, targeting Hindu American voters in Florida, Ohio, and North Carolina. RHC volunteers placed yard signs throughout the I-4 corridor in Florida and mounted a GOTV effort.

Shalabh Kumar, in his capacity as chairman of Indian American Advisory Council of Trump, created the 'Ab ki Baar Trump Sarkar' campaign which went viral instantly gathering over 2 million views in the first week. Shalabh Kumar became a sensation overnight on social media and TV & print media. He ran multiple digital ad campaigns in favor of Trump through video & social content targeting Indian-Americans and undecided voters in the battleground states. By some accounts, the AB Ki Baar Trump Sarkar has been viewed by 1.2 billion people worldwide.

In the final three days of the campaign, the RHC made a large digital buy to target undecided Non-Hindu 8 million voters in Florida, North Carolina, Wisconsin, Ohio, Michigan, and Pennsylvania.

The story of the Hindu American campaign of 2016 has been written by James Kahrs in a book titled “Ab Ki Baar Trump Sarkar” in which a candidate for President of the United States and the Nominee of one of the two main political parties in the US, spoke in Hindi and proudly pronounced “We Love Hindus”. In a forward on this book, Speaker Newt Gingrich wrote: “Shalli’s success in the business world is legend, with his reputation built by his ability to recognize the best path to greatness…This book tells the story of how Shalli was able to pull off this historic feat….We can only hope that other important ethnic minorities in the United States have Shalli Kumar’s to lead them so effectively, to promote the causes sacred to us.”

=== Trump $10 million Hindu campaign ===
In August 2016, Kumar was named Chairman of the Indian Advisory Board for the Trump campaign. In this capacity, he designed the "Abki bar Trump Sarkar" ("This time, Trump government") campaign to sway Hindu/Indian voters. Borrowing the slogan popularized by Indian Prime Minister Narendra Modi in his 2014 campaign, the campaign ran an ad featuring Donald Trump speaking in Hindi and stating his love of India and Hindu people.

As a minority Trump supporter, Kumar served as a campaign surrogate, appearing on national television shows, including Fox Business, as well as in more than 200 national print and online profiles. He also advocated for Trump in three hour-long debates on Indian television which were broadcast in the US.

Kumar and his family members personally donated over $1.5 million to Trump. In addition, Kumar bundled $150,000 in political donations to the Trump campaign. Many of these donations came from Indian Americans who had never before donated to political campaigns. Coupled with the RHC concert, the Kumar family spent over $4 million in the Trump campaign.

On 5 January, Kumar made a cameo appearance in Washington to attend a farewell party hosted by the Indian Ambassador to the United States Navtej Sarna at his Cleveland Park mansion for the outgoing Deputy Chief of Mission Taranjit Singh Sandhu. In his brief speech Kumar praised Sandhu, who is leaving for Colombo to take charge as the Indian High Commissioner to Sri Lanka.

=== Shalabh Kumar and President Trump reconnect in 2022 ===
After the 2016 campaign, at the end of 2018, Mr. Kumar went back to his business of inventing new products. In March 2022, President Trump reached out to Mr. Kumar asking him to re-engage as he was planning to run again in 2024. President Trump hosted a Diwali celebration for 182 leaders of RHC from across the country on October 21 of 2022. He allowed his home at Mar-a-Lago to be decorated as a Hindu Rajasthan palace. In his speech, he made some significant policy announcements:

1. He will see to it that if he ran and became the 47th President of the United States, the US and Bharat will become "even better friends". 2. He would be tough with China in terms of sustained tariffs on Chinese imports to US. He offered to write a forward for Mr. Kumar’s upcoming book: “Chinese Colonization of America and the only man who can stop it.” 3. He will support legislation to end the country wide quota for green cards from migrants from India. 4. He will support legislation to protect the 200,000 + Hindu kids who arrived in the US legally from deportation when they turn 21. 5. He will see to it a significant number of some “very smart” Hindu Americans get appointed in various administrative positions in his next administration. 6. He announced that he will appoint Mr. Shalabh Kumar as his US Ambassador to India. 7. He supports the idea of building a Hindu Genocide Memorial in Washington, DC. 8. President Trump ended his speech by saying in Hindi: “Bharat and America Subse Acche Dost” (Bharat and America are better friends than all others” and “Shalli and Trump Sabse Acche Dost. (Shalli and Trump are better friends than all others).

=== Shalabh Kumar appointed as National Chairman of newly formed Hindu and Indian American Coalition of Republican National Committee ===
In an effort to increase the engagement of Hindu Americans with the Republican Party, the RNC decided to form a new coalition titled the Hindu and Indian American Coalition of Republican National Committee. There are 6 million Hindu Americans in the US with approximately 3.3 million voters. This is one of the most powerful coalitions within the RNC. Mr. Kumar has been appointed as its first National Chair by RNC Chair Ronna McDaniel. community totally almost 150,000 in numbers in the Chicago area. RRC is a 60,000 sq. ft. building donated to the community by Kumar family.

Formation and Launch of Congressional Hindu Caucus and appointment of Shalabh Kumar as its Policy Advisor

Shalabh Kumar has been advocating the formation of a Congressional Hindu Caucus for a number of years, expressing its importance for the most prominent legislative body in the US to look out for the interests of the Hindu American community. On November 15, 2023 in Washington DC the Caucus was officially inaugurated in a celebration with its Co-Chairs Congresswoman Elise Stefanik, Chairwoman of the Republican House Conference and Chairman Pete Sessions. 20 other Republican members of US House of Representatives joined to celebrate this caucus inauguration.
