= Vandi Verma =

Roboticist at NASA's Jet Propulsion Laboratory and driver of the Mars rovers

Dr. Vandi Verma
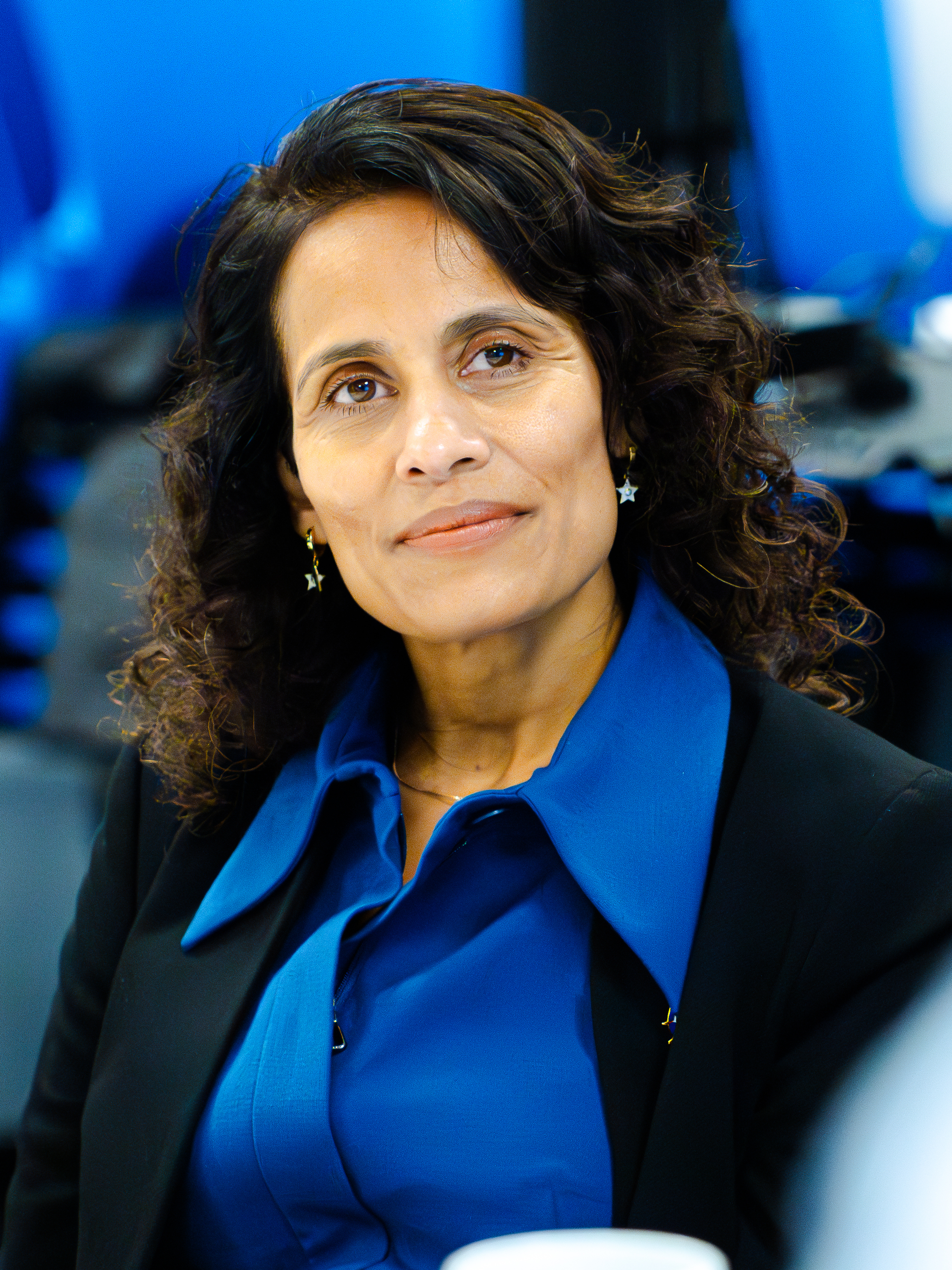
- Verma in 2024
- Born: Vandana Verma
- Other name: Vandi Verma Tompkins
- Education: Kendriya Vidyalaya No. 2, Halwara
- Alma mater: Punjab Engineering College; Carnegie Mellon University
- Known for: Mars Exploration Rovers; Mars Science Laboratory; PLEXIL
- Scientific career
- Fields: Robotics, artificial intelligence, autonomous robotic systems
- Workplaces: NASA's Jet Propulsion Laboratory
- Thesis: Tractable Particle Filters for Robot Fault Diagnosis (2005)

Vandana "Vandi" Verma is a space roboticist and chief engineer at NASA's Jet Propulsion Laboratory, known for driving the Mars rovers, notably Curiosity and Perseverance, using software including PLEXIL programming technology that she co-wrote and developed.

== Biography ==
Verma was born and grew up partly in Halwara, India; her father was a pilot in the Indian Air Force. She gained her first qualification, a bachelor's degree in electrical engineering, at Punjab Engineering College in Chandigarh, India. She went on to gain a master's in robotics from Carnegie Mellon University (CMU) followed by a PhD in robotics from Carnegie Mellon in 2005, with a thesis entitled Tractable Particle Filters for Robot Fault Diagnosis.

At CMU, she developed in interest in robotics in unknown environments. She was involved in a 3-year astrobiology experimental station in the Atacama Desert. The desert was chosen because of the similarities between its hostile environment and the surface of Mars. She won a competition to create a robot to navigate a maze and collect balloons. She tested robotic technologies in the Arctic and Antarctic.

Between studies, she gained her pilot's license.

Her first post-graduate job was at Ames Research Center as a research scientist.

In 2006, Verma co-wrote PLEXIL, an open source programming language now used in automation technologies such as the NASA K10 rover, Mars Curiosity rover's percussion drill, the International Space Station, the Deep Space Habitat and Habitat Demonstration Unit, the Edison Demonstration of Smallsat Networks, LADEE, and Autonomy Operating System (AOS).

In 2007, Verma joined NASA's Jet Propulsion Laboratory (JPL) with a special interest in robotics and flight software. The following year, she became part of the Mars rover team. As of 2019, she leads JPL's Autonomous Systems, Mobility and Robotic Systems group.

Verma has written academic papers in her field on subjects such as the AEGIS (Autonomous Exploration for Gathering Increased Science) targeting system, NASA Lunar rover operation and robot fault detection, an area she has worked consistently.

Verma helped develop flight and flight simulation software systems used by the Mars 2020 rover.

Verma frequently participates in JPL's open house events at the lab and online as a science communicator to encourage children (and particularly girls) into STEM careers.

== Mars robotics ==
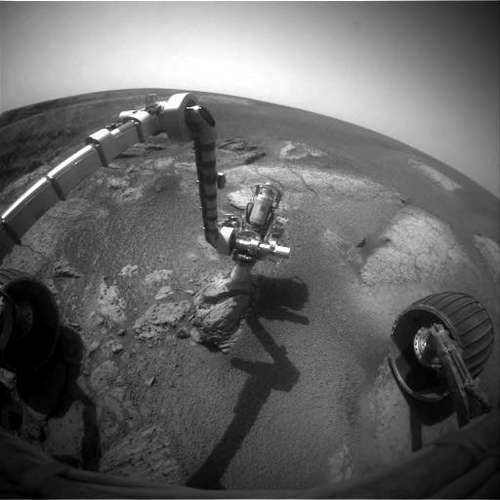
Mars rover Opportunity drills into a rock to retrieve a sample using its robotic arm.

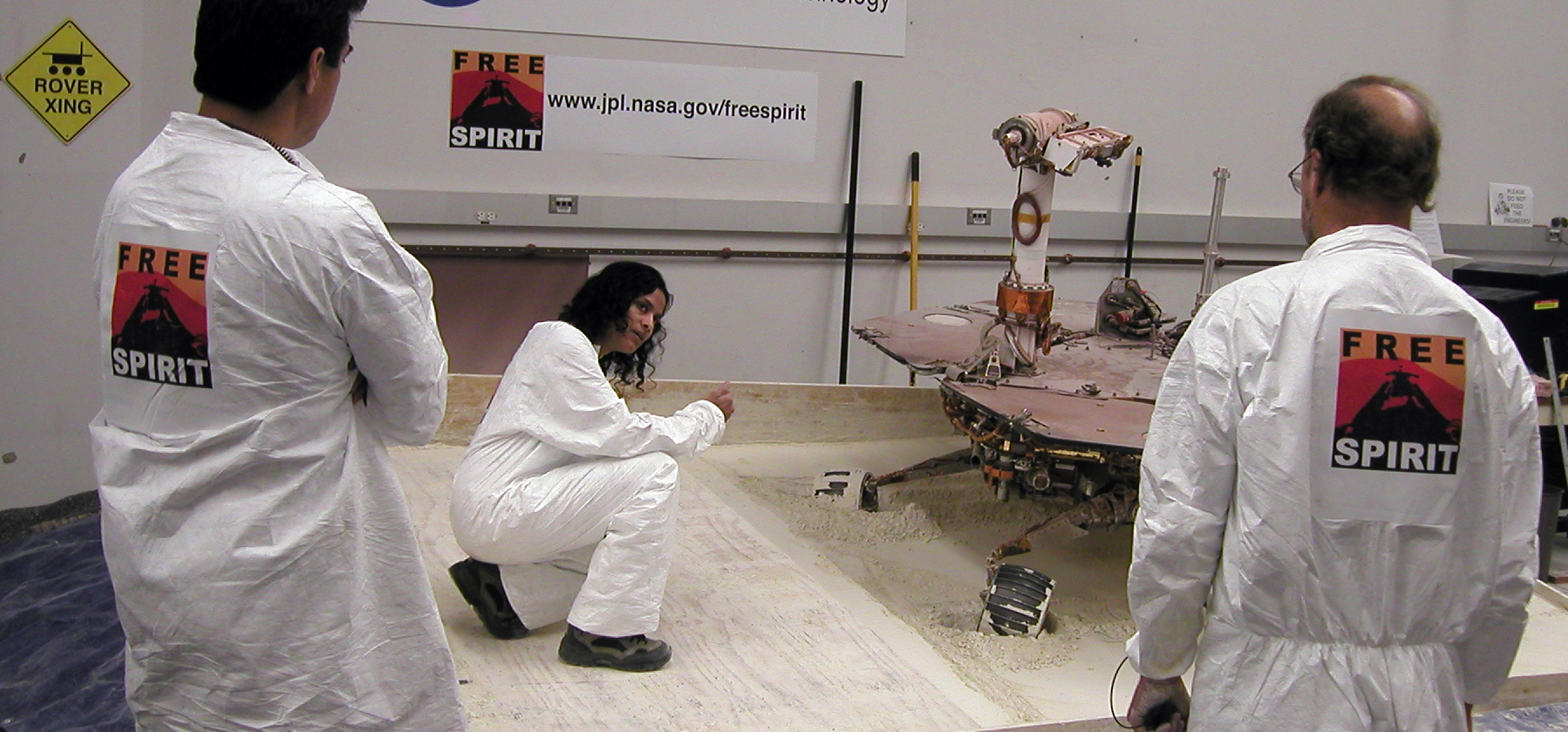
MER team members Alfonso Herrera, Vandana Verma, Bruce Banerdt, testing Spirit rover

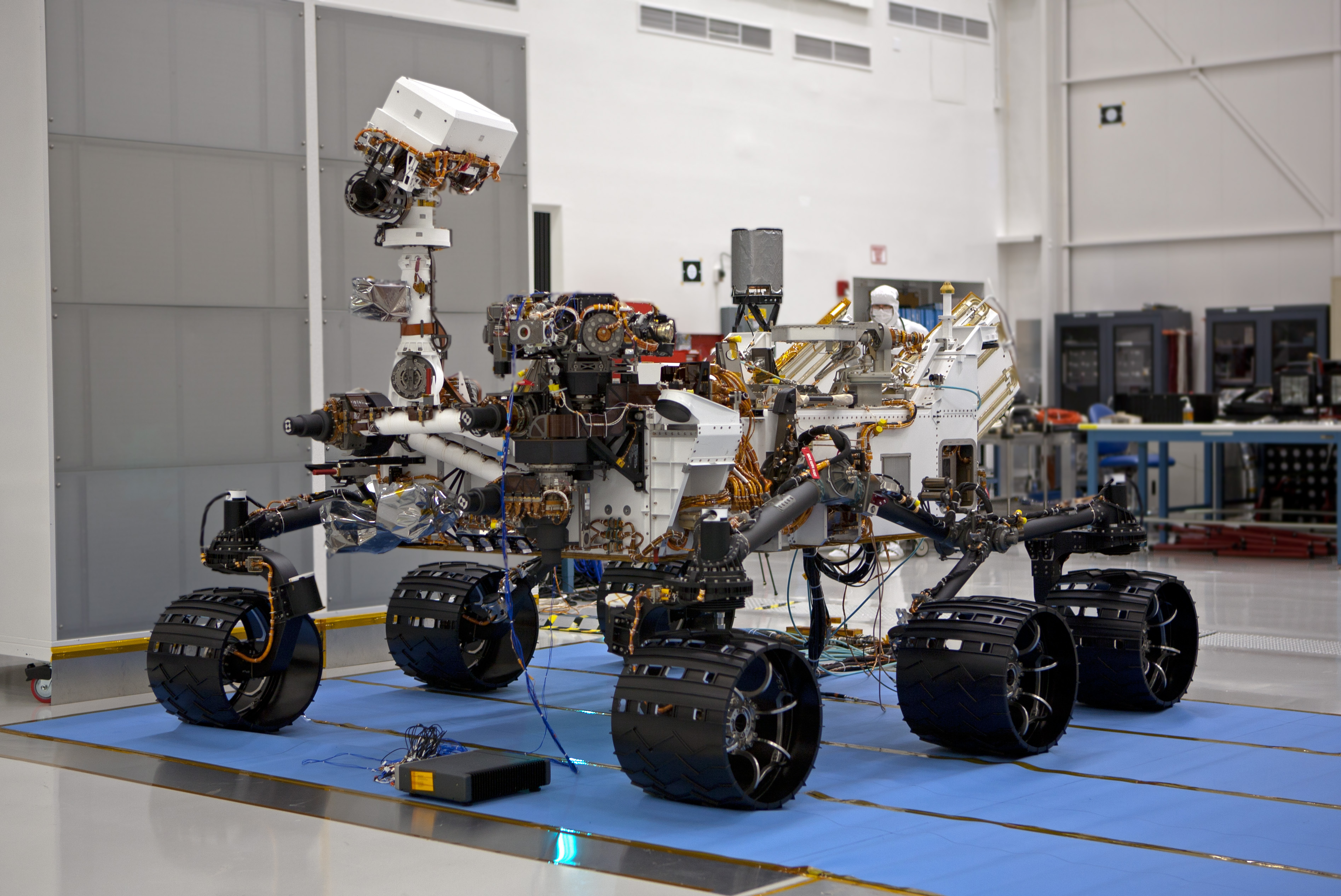
Mars rover Curiosity, Spacecraft Assembly Facility, Pasadena (2011)

Verma has worked on NASA's Mars Exploration Rover projects since 2008 and has operated all three rovers: MER-A Spirit; MER-B Opportunity; and Mars Science Laboratory's Curiosity. Verma explains that in order to operate robotic spacecraft efficiently, the team must adjust to the sol, or Martian day, which is 24 hours, 39 minutes, and 35.244 seconds, by beginning each day 40 minutes later. This kind of shift work involves covering the windows at home and work. Verma says:

"We tend to live by the Mars clock and many have Mars watches."

As of 2018, there have been approximately 12 rover drivers. She explains how driving the rover is an extremely slow operation, since commands can take from four up to 20 minutes to reach the device, so commands are usually performed first as a simulation, and multiple commands are uploaded at a time via NASA's Deep Space Network, relaying signals using Mars Odyssey orbiter.

Operating the rover involves a large team effort with scientists performing experiments across different fields. A typical set of commands will have involved evaluating previous 3D images, developing a plan and route to maximize exploratory potential without risking the rover's safety (including using Curiosity's 2 meter robotic arm), choreographing and simulating moves, and then integrating each step of the sequence into a detailed set of instructions.

Verma said in 2012:

"I do realise that I possibly have one of the coolest jobs in the world."

== Awards ==
Verma has received numerous awards for her team work including:

- 2008 NASA Earth Science team award for Intelligent Autonomy Technology Transition Team
- 2010 NASA Honors award to the MER Electro-mechanical Failure Mitigation Team
- 2013 NASA Honors Award to the MSL to the Motor Control Team
- 2013 NASA Honors Award to the MSL Surface Sampling and Science Systems Team
- 2013 NASA Honors Award to the MSL Testbed and Simulation Support Equipment Team
- 2014 NASA Software of the Year Award, awarded to the Mars Science Laboratory Flight Software Team
- 2016 MSL AEGIS Team Award
- 2017 MSL CHIMRA (Collection and Handling for In-Situ Martian Rock Analysis) Award for Tunnel Anomaly Recovery

== Other media ==
In 2011 Verma appeared in and directed an episode of Nova ScienceNow called Can We Make It to Mars?

Verma appears in US Air Force documentary Science in the Extremes series 3, episode 6 by Seeker explaining her 2020 work on Mars' surface.

In 2018 Finnish director Minna Långström made a documentary about Verma and her work with the Mars rover Curiosity titled The Other Side of Mars (original Finnish title Mars kuvien takaa). The film focuses on the way images are made, their manipulation and use which shapes our understanding of space and technology.

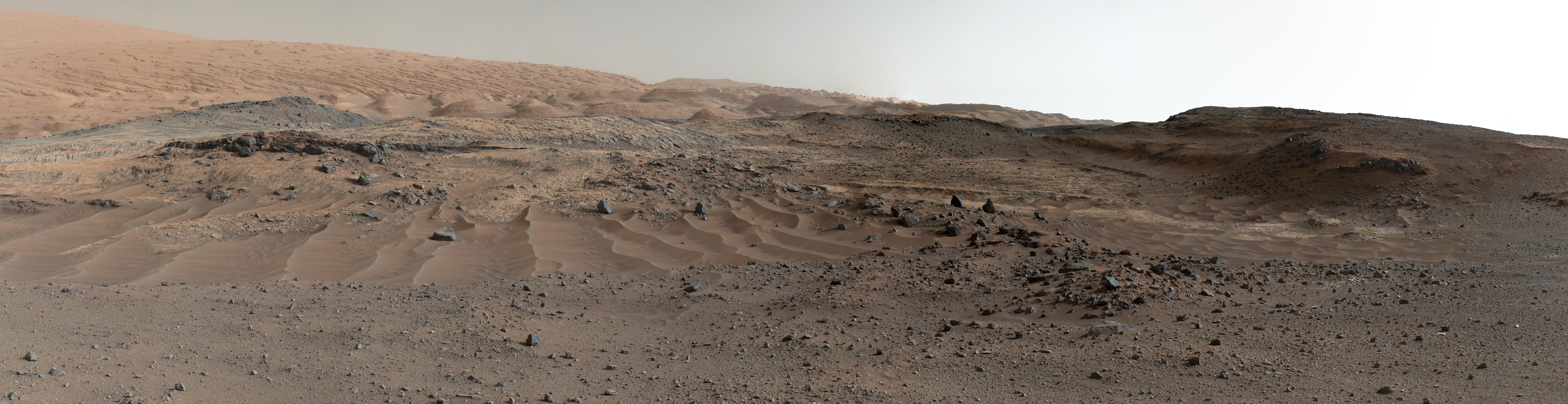
A southward-looking panorama combining images from both cameras of the Mast Camera (Mastcam) on NASA's Curiosity Mars Rover

In 2022 Verna appeared in Good Night Oppy, a full length documentary film telling the story of Spirit and Opportunity and their 15 year mission.

== See also ==
- Adam Steltzner
- Anita Sengupta
- Bobak Ferdowsi
- List of missions to Mars
