= Punjab Engineering College =

Engineering college in Chandigarh, India

Coordinates: 30°46′N 76°47′E

Punjab Engineering College (Deemed to be University)
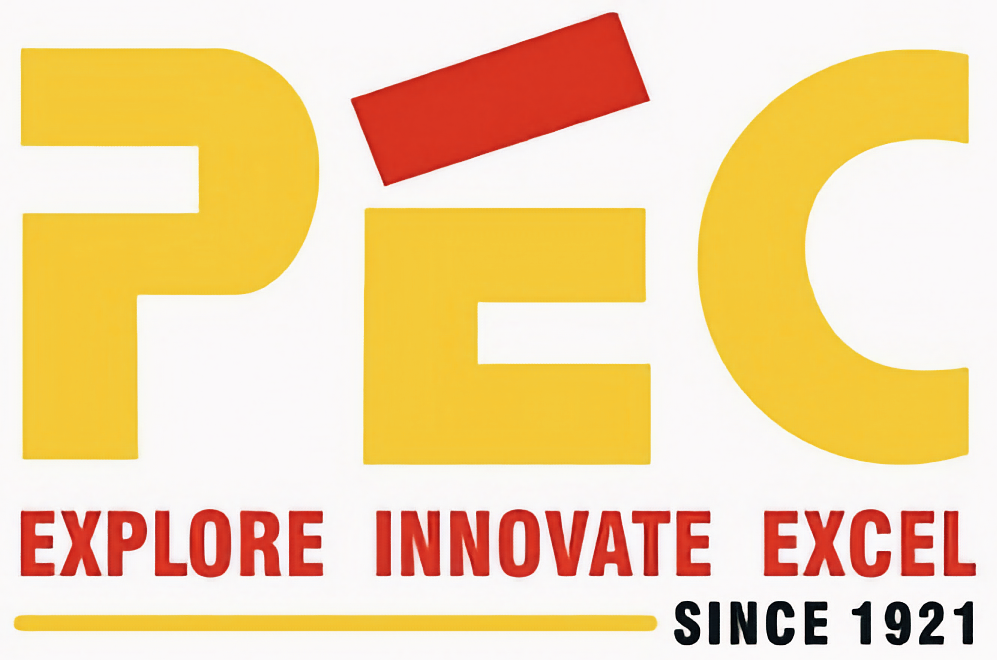
- Former names: PEC University of Technology; East Panjab Engineering College; Mughalpura Technical College; Maclagan Engineering College
- Motto: एकता और अनुशासन (Hindi)
- Motto in English: Unity and Discipline
- Type: Government Funded Technical Institution Public engineering school
- Established: 1921; 105 years ago
- Affiliations: UGC
- Chairman: Rajinder Gupta
- Director: Rajesh Kumar Bhatia (Ad-interim)
- Undergraduates: 3,000
- Postgraduates: 500
- Location: Chandigarh, India
- Campus: 146 acres (59 ha); Urban
- Colors
- Website: www.pec.ac.in

Punjab Engineering College (Deemed to be University) (abbreviated PEC or PEC Chandigarh) is a public research & technical institution in Chandigarh. It was founded in 1921 in Lahore, established in Chandigarh in 1953, and focuses on the field of applied sciences, particularly engineering and technology. It is well-known for its undergraduate and graduate programmes in engineering, to which the entry is through the Joint Entrance Examination – Mains and Graduate Aptitude Test in Engineering. It offers degrees such as Bachelor of Technology, Master of Technology and MBA. It also has a comprehensive graduate program offering doctoral degrees in Science, Technology, Engineering and Mathematics.

== History ==
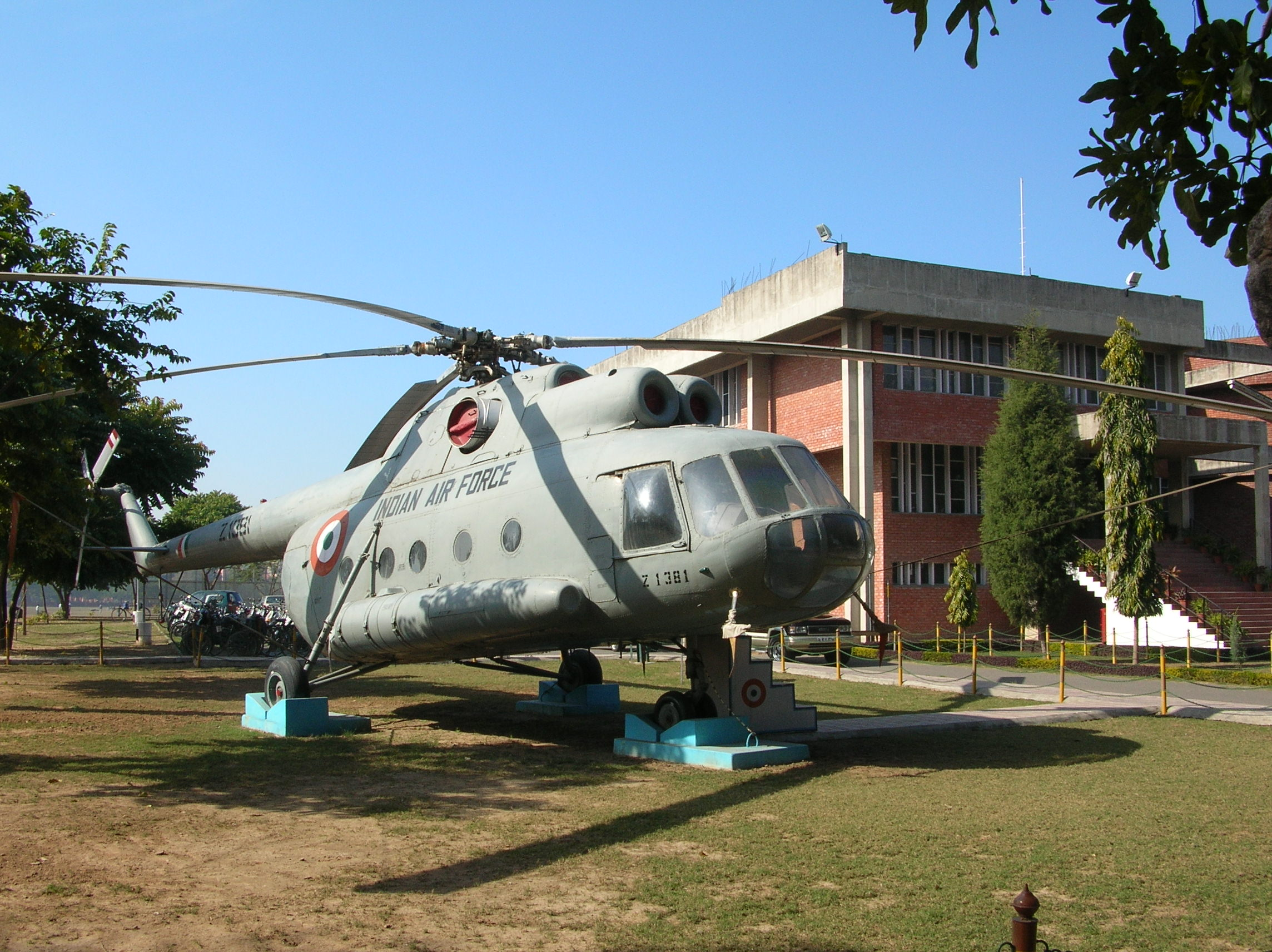
University administration building

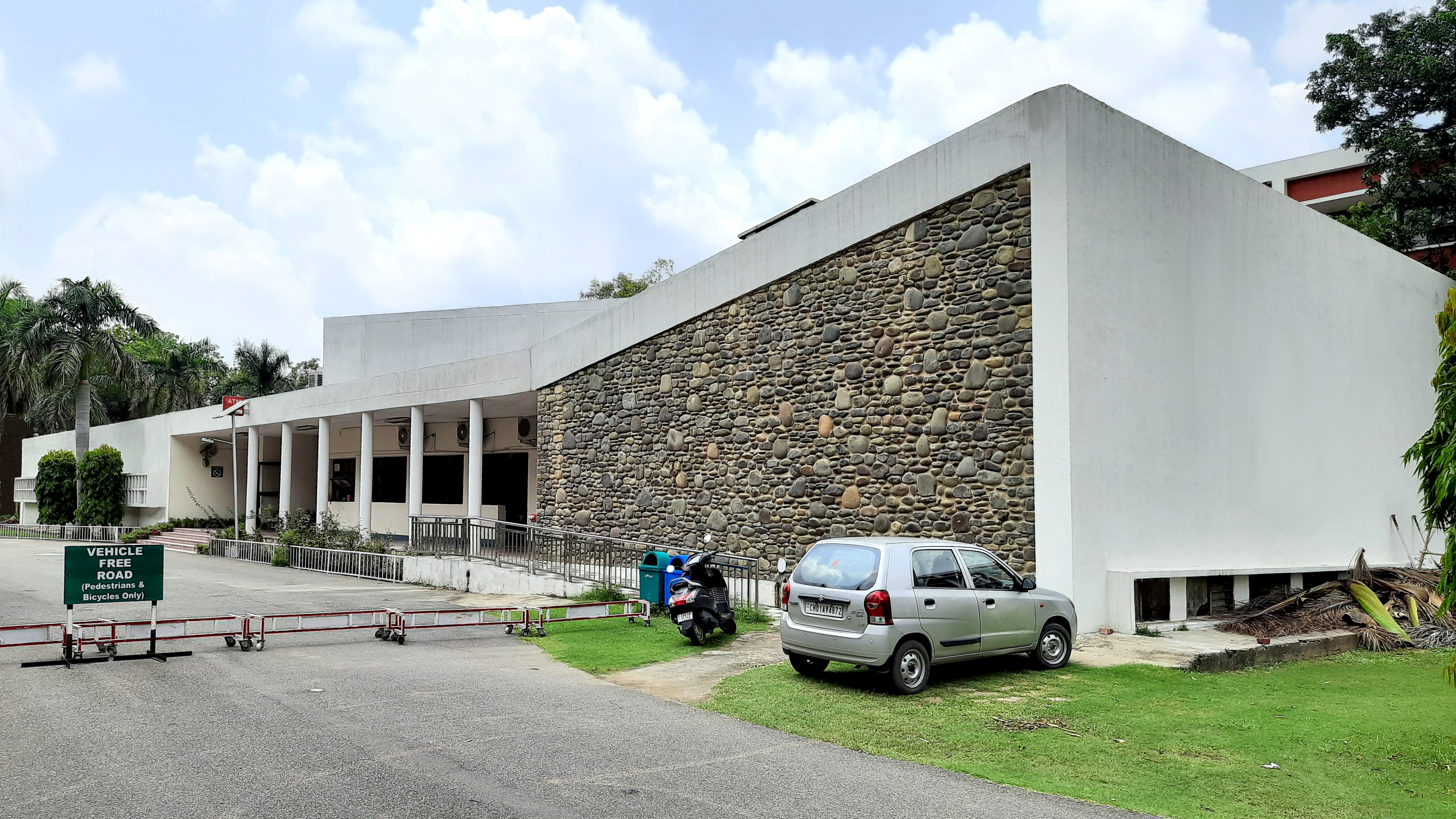
Punjab Engineering College - Academic Wing -1

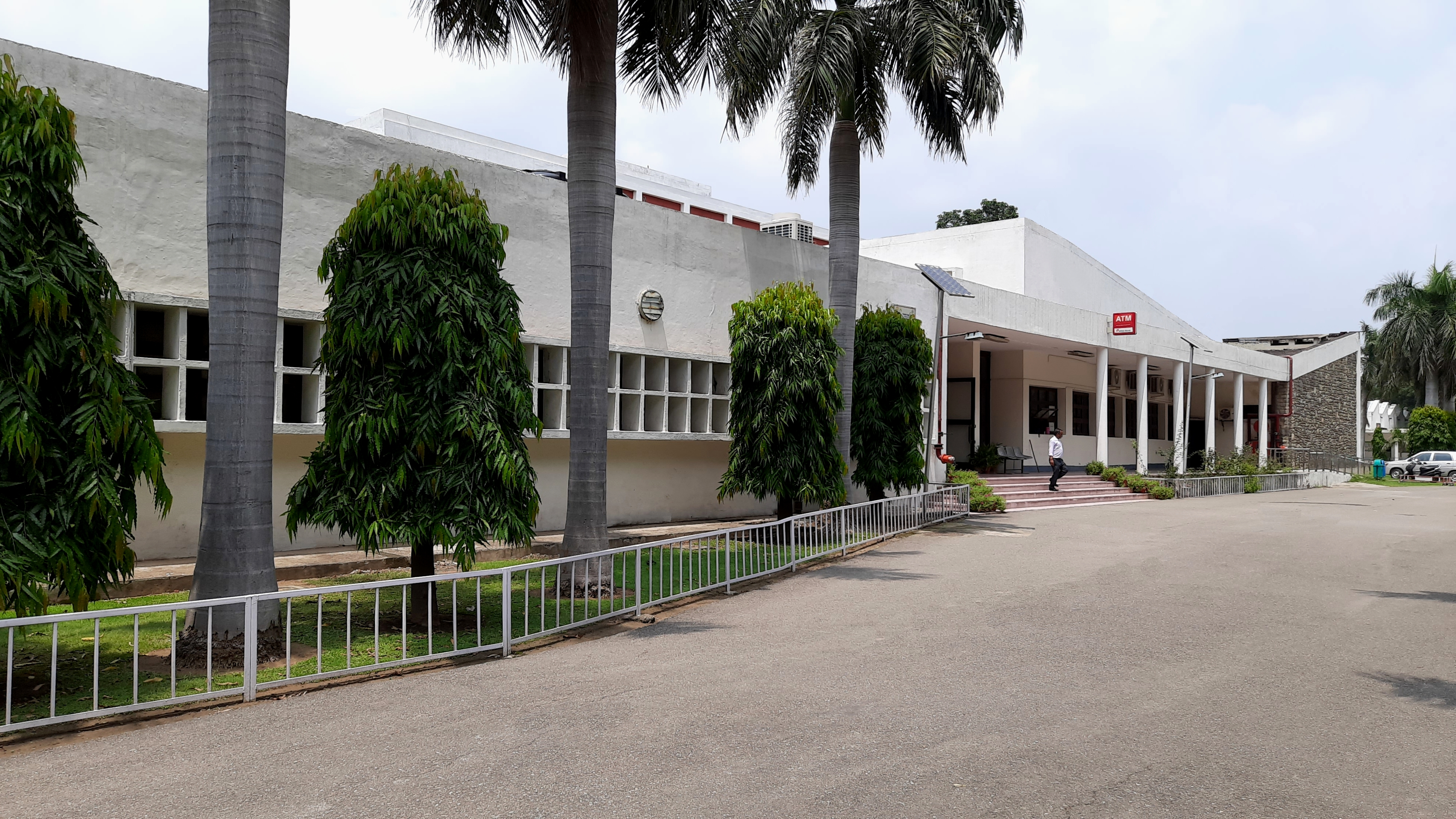
Punjab Engineering College - Academic Wing -2

PEC was established in 1921 in Mughalpura, a suburb of Lahore, Punjab, erstwhile British India as the Mughalpura Technical College. In 1923, the name was changed to Maclagan Engineering College to honour Sir Edward Maclagan, the then Governor of Punjab. In 1939, the name was again changed to Punjab College of Engineering and Technology.

In 1932 the institution became affiliated with the University of Punjab for awarding a bachelor's degree in engineering. After partition in 1947, the college was relocated to Roorkee in India and was renamed East Punjab College of Engineering. In the year 1950, the word East was dropped. Towards the end of December 1953, the college shifted to its present campus in Chandigarh as an affiliated campus of Panjab University. In October 2003, the Government of India recognized the college as a Deemed University and thereafter it became known as Punjab Engineering College (Deemed University).

In 1994 this institution was adjudged the best technical college in India by the National Foundation of Engineers. It occupies an area of 146 acres and offers Bachelor of Engineering degrees in various specializations.

PEC has historically differed from Central Educational Institutions (CEIs) by not providing a 27% OBC reservation. Following the Central Educational Institutions (Reservation in Admission) Act, 2006, PEC—a "Deemed to be University" under the Chandigarh Administration—argued it was a UT-funded institute rather than a CEI, exempting it from the mandate. This was legally challenged in 2018 (Gujar Samaj Kalyan Parishad v. PEC), where the Punjab and Haryana High Court upheld PEC's stance, ruling that its indirect funding through the UT administration meant the 2006 Act did not automatically apply. However, a 2025 Supreme Court directive has recently mandated a phased implementation of the OBC quota for Chandigarh-governed institutes, starting at 3% for the 2025–26 session and rising to 27% over six years. Currently, PEC operates on a 50-50 split between the Chandigarh (Home State) and All India (Other State) quotas.

Presently there are twelve post-graduate courses leading to a Master of Engineering degree. Facilities for post-graduate studies exist for regular and part-time students. The college has facilities for research work leading to the award of the PhD degree in engineering in certain selected fields of different disciplines.

== Academics ==
=== Academic programmes ===
Institute offers Bachelor of Technology (previously Bachelor of Engineering) in:

- Aerospace Engineering
- Civil Engineering
- Computer Science and Engineering
- Computer Science and Engineering (Artificial Intelligence)
- Computer Science and Engineering (Data Science)
- Electrical Engineering
- Electronics and Communication Engineering
- Electronics Engineering (VLSI)
- Mathematics and Computing
- Mechanical Engineering
- Metallurgical and Materials Engineering
- Production and Industrial Engineering
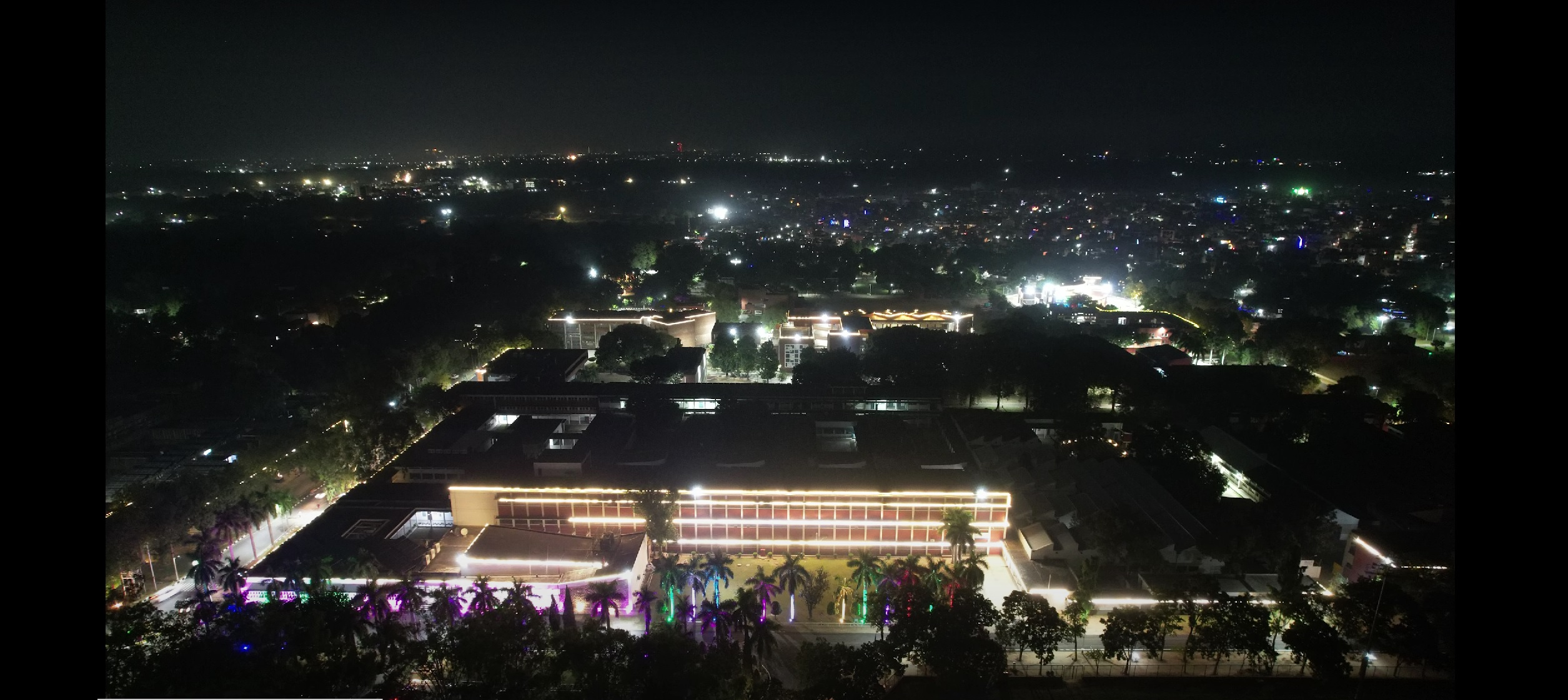
  Aerial night view, PEC
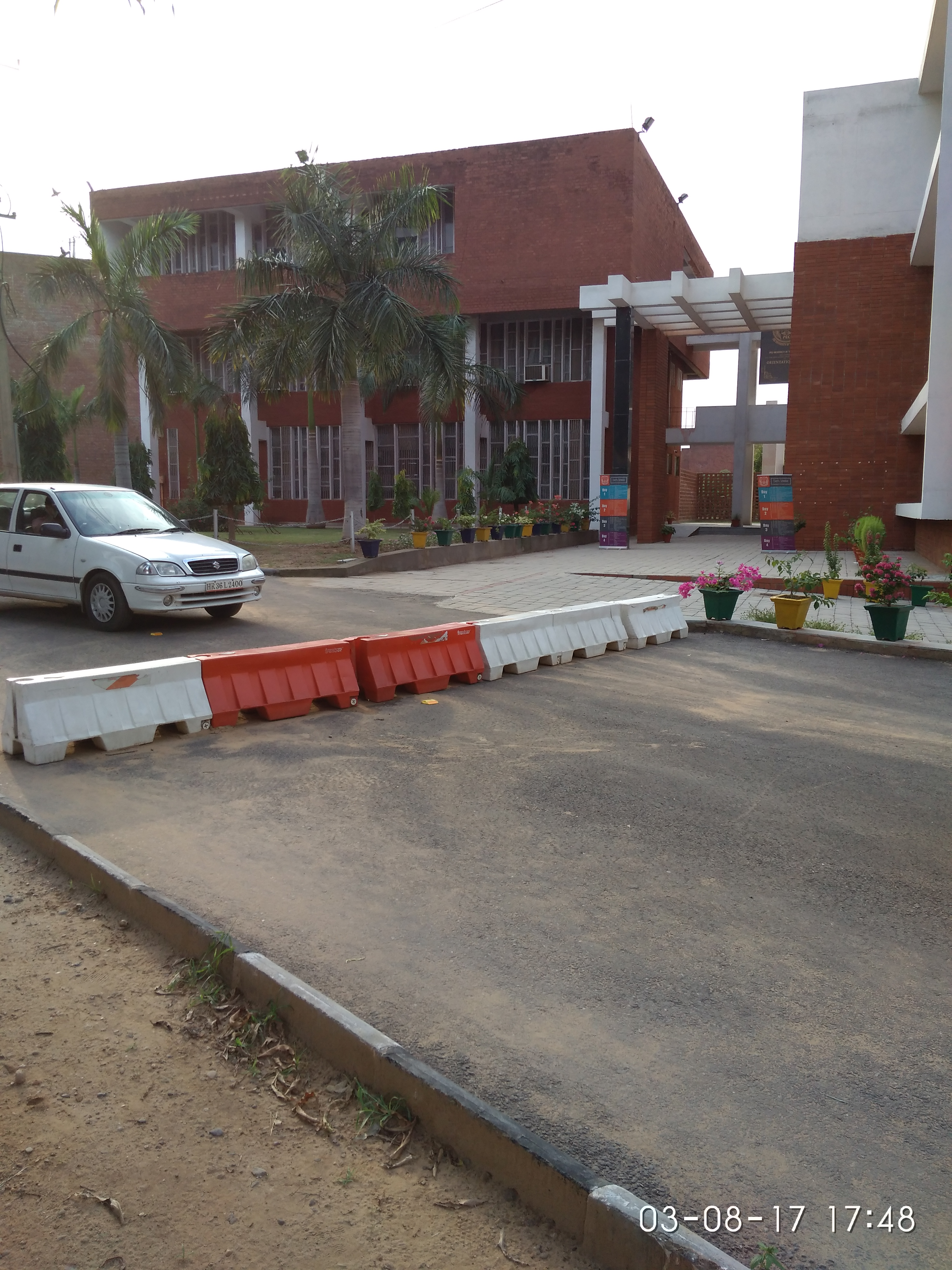
  New Academic block, PEC

The institute also offers 'Master of Technology degrees‘ in the following specializations:

- Computer Science and Engineering (with specialization in AI, Cyber security, Software Engineering, Data Engineering)
- Highways, Structures, Hydraulics and Irrigation, Rotodynamic Machines
- Electrical Power Systems
- Environmental Engineering
- Electronics Engineering
- Metallurgical Engineering
- VLSI
- MBA (Business and Data Analytics)
- Humanities

The institute offers Bachelor of Design as well.

The institute also awards minor degrees to undergraduates in fields other than their major stream of study.

=== Collaborations ===
The college has collaborated with national and international educational institutions for student exchange programs. MoUs have been signed with corporates to attract projects and internships. Some of these collaborations are:

- PEC has collaborations with a large number of international companies and universities, to name a few such as:
  - Indian Institute of Science
  - Indian Institute of Technology Roorkee
  - Indian Institute of Technology Ropar
  - Indian Institute of Technology Jammu
  - Indian Institute of Technology Mandi
  - National Institute of Technologies
  - SMVDU, Katra
  - PGIMER, Chandigarh
  - NITIE, Mumbai
  - Microsoft
  - Intel
  - IBM
  - Eic Pvt.Ltd., Chandigarh
  - ABB Global Industries & Services Ltd. Bangalore
  - Minda Corporation Ltd Noida
  - Central Tool Room, Ludhiana
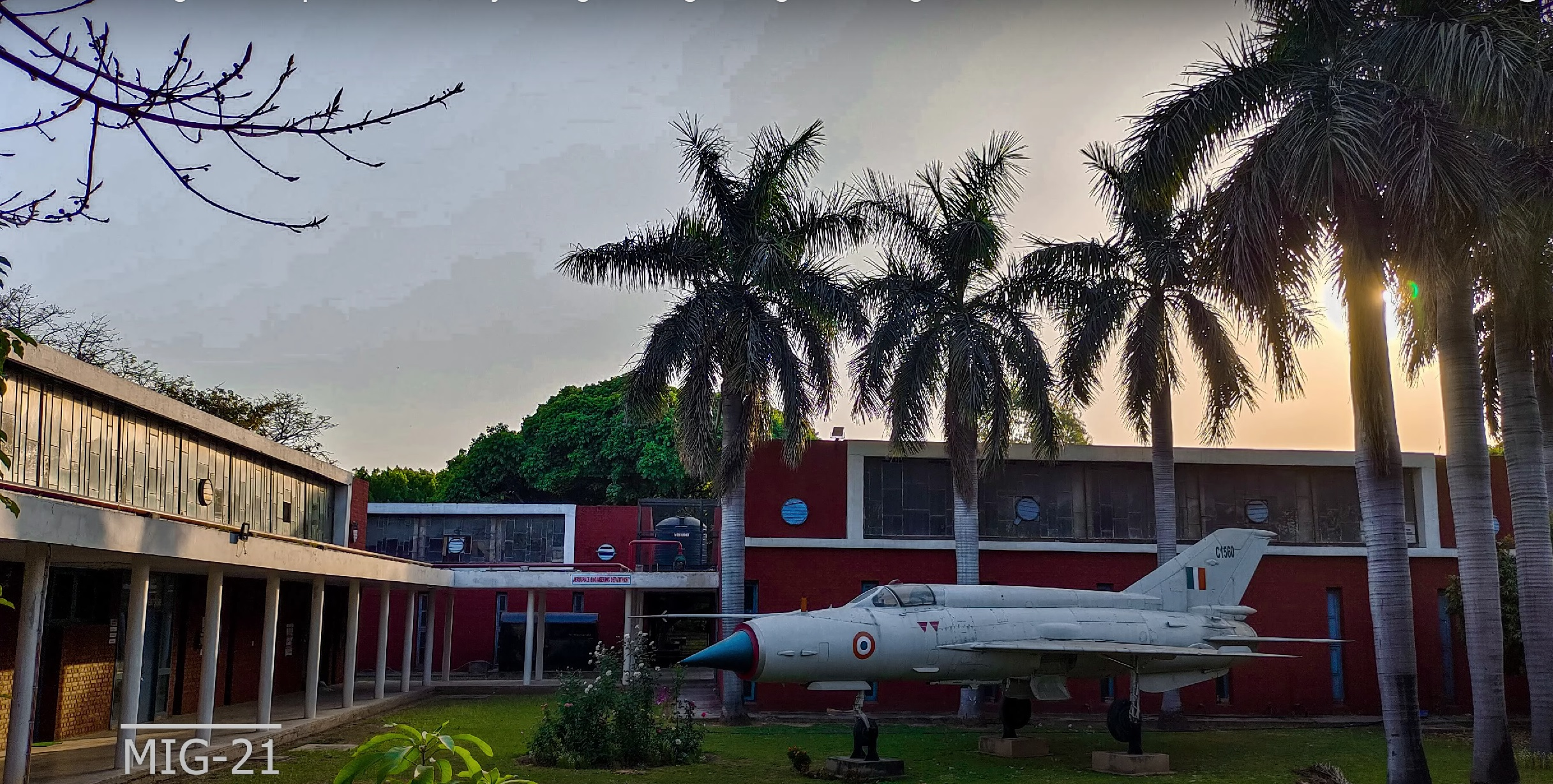
  - MIG-21 at Aerospace Department, PEC
    CONCAVE Research Centre, Concordia University, Canada
  - Central Scientific Instruments Organization, Chandigarh
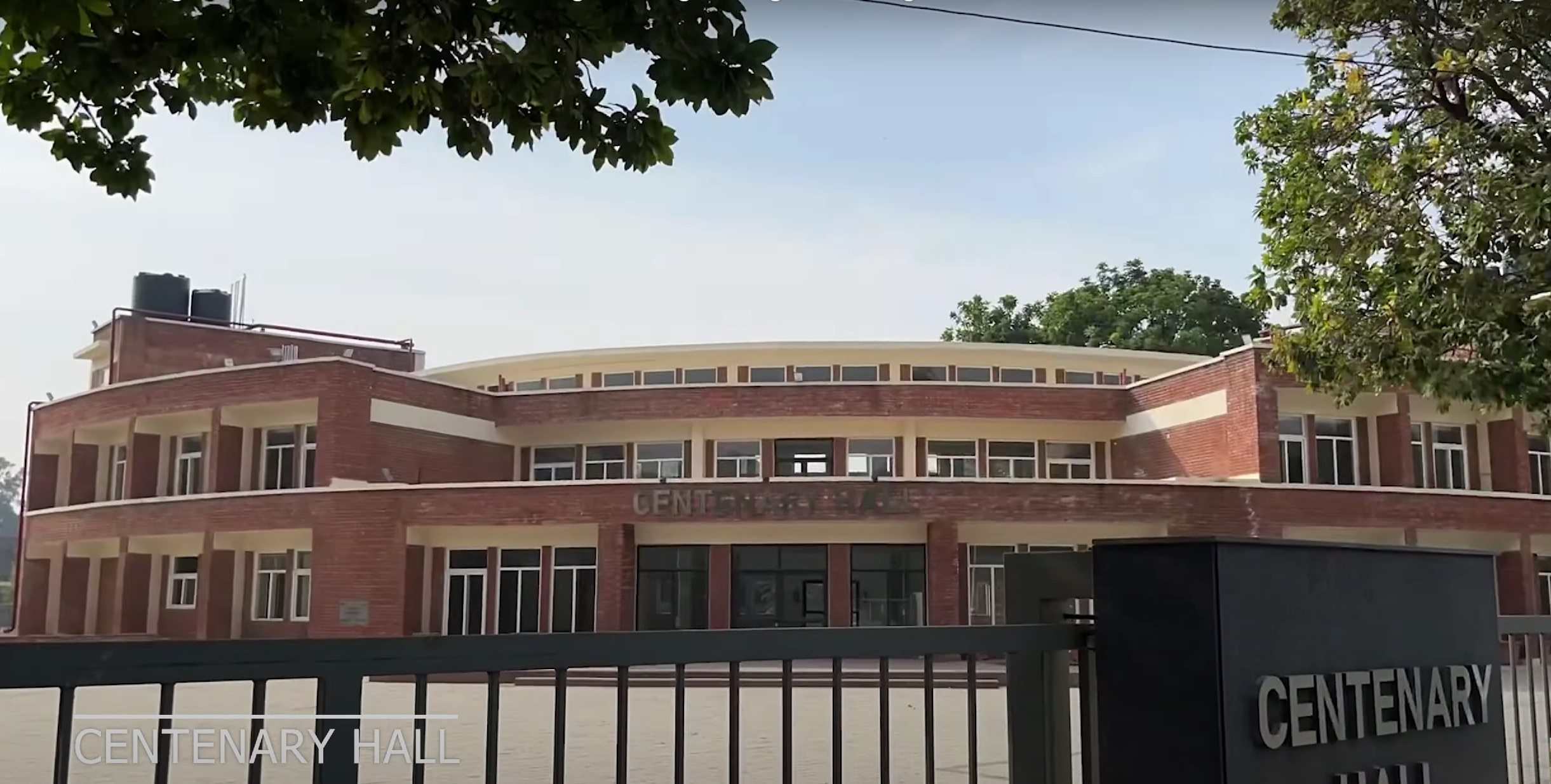
  - Centenary Hall, PEC
    Swaraj Division (a unit of FES M&M), Mohali
  - Mohali Industries Association, Mohali
  - Philips India Ltd.PEC-ESIGELEC France collaboration (Feb, 2009)
  - MoA between PEC and Siemens Software to develop a centre of excellence at PEC.
  - Solar tech Park at PEC campus established in support with Bergen Group of Companies
  - PEC-ABB collaboration
  - PEC-UWA collaboration
  - PEC-JCB collaboration initiated
  - PEC-Philips collaboration
  - PEC-CSIO collaboration
  - PEC-PGCIL collaboration

== Student life ==
=== Cultural and Technical festivals ===
==== PECFEST ====
PECFEST is the annual cultural and technical fest of PEC Chandigarh. The festival started as a cultural event in 2003. It usually runs for three days in the month of November.

In 2014, PECFEST merged with VYOM (the technical fest of PEC) and consequently, now acts as an umbrella festival for both cultural and technical events and competitions. The fest has seen various musical and cultural acts perform on the final day, such as Javed Ali, Sukhwinder Singh, Sunidhi Chauhan and Asees Kaur.

==== VYOM ====
Vyom (earlier known as Technique before being renamed in 2011) was the university's annual technical festival that ran from 2008 to 2014. It was discontinued in 2015 and the technical events are now conducted as part of PECFEST.

=== Student organizations ===
Currently, there are 12 technical societies and 12 clubs active in the college, and these are named as:

Technical societies

- ACM-CSS - Computer Science Society (Recognized under ACM student chapter)
- ATS - Aerospace Technical Society
- ASCE - American Society of Civil Engineers (Student Chapter)
- ASME - American Society of Mechanical Engineers (Student Chapter)
- ASPS - Astronomy and Space Physics Society
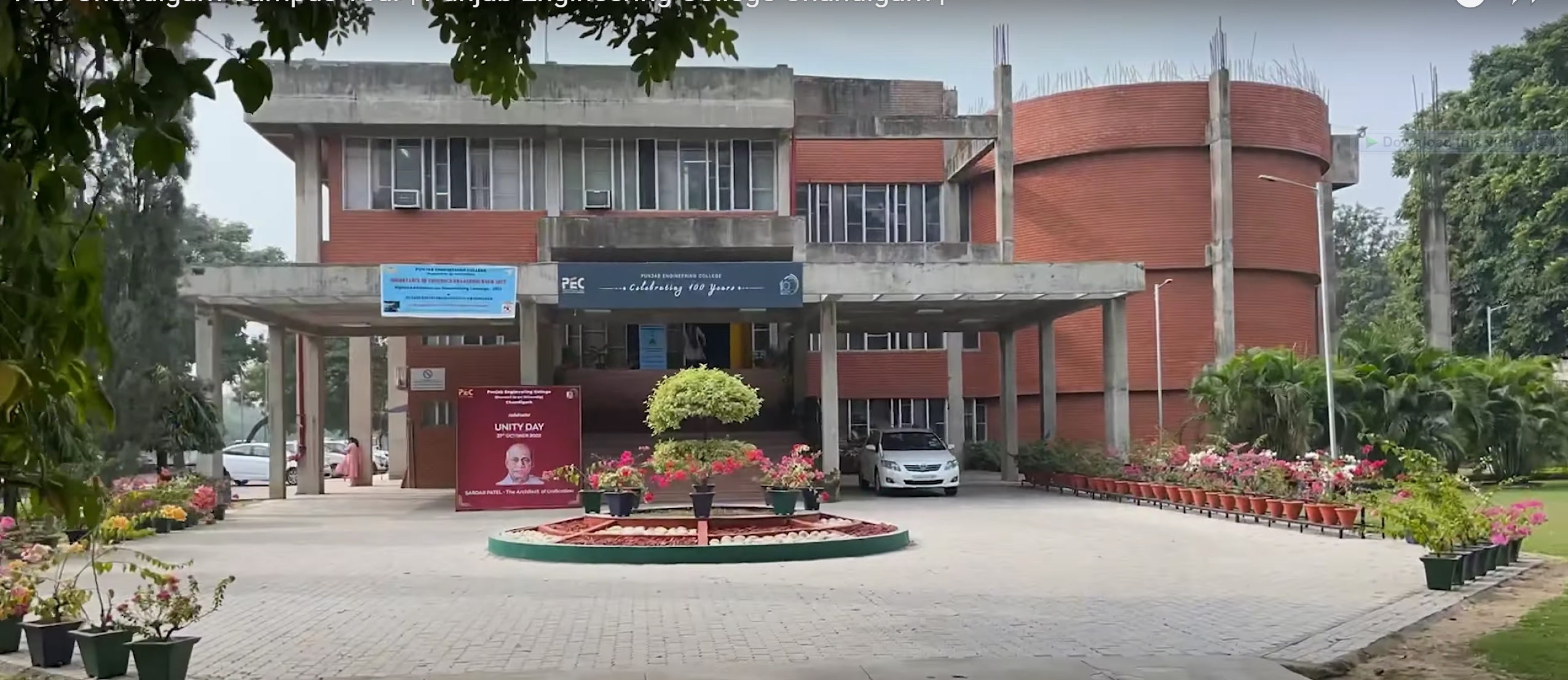
  Administrative Block PEC
- IEEE - The Institute of Electrical and Electronics Engineers Student Chapter
- IGS - Indian Geotechnical Society
- IIM - Indian Institute of Metals
- The Robotics Society
- SAE - The Society of Automotive Engineers Student Chapter
- SESI - Solar Energy Society of India
- SME - The Society of Manufacturing Engineers Student Chapter

Students Council

- SAC- Students Affairs Council

Clubs

- NCC (National Cadet Corps) under 2 Chandigarh battalion.
- NSS (National Service Scheme)
- Projection & Design Club (PDC)
- Communications Information and Media Cell
- Music Club
- Robotics Club
- Speakers Association And Study Circle (SAASC)
- Dramatics Club
- Art and Photography Club
- Energy and Envirovision Club
- Rotaract Club
- Punjabi Editorial Board (PEB)
- English Editorial Board (EEB)
- Hindi Editorial Board (HEB)
- Images

Cells

- Student Counselling Cell (Happy Folks of PEC)
- Entrepreneurship Incubation Cell
- Women Empowerment Cell

=== Hostels ===
There are four hostels for boys and two hostels for girls. Each hostel is self-contained with amenities such as a reading room/indoor games/TV room, dining hall and mess. Every hostel has a student chairman (Hostel Senior) for managing and controlling various activities.

Girls' hostels:

- Kalpana Chawla Hostel (named after alumni Kalpana Chawla)
- Vindhya Hostel

Boys' hostels:

- Aravali Hostel
- Himalaya Hostel
- Kuruksheta Hostel
- Shivalik Hostel

== Notable alumni ==
- Satish Dhawan - known for Indian Space Programme
- Kalpana Chawla - Space Shuttle Columbia astronaut; BE Aeronautical (1982).
- Badshah (Aditya Prateek Singh), Punjabi singer and rapper; BE Civil Engineering (2006)
- Sandeep Bakhshi, CEO of ICICI Bank
- Jaspal Bhatti - satirist, comedian, film-maker; BE Electrical (1978).
- Vijay K. Dhir - Dean of the University of California, Los Angeles (UCLA) Henry Samueli School of Engineering and Applied Science
- Adesh Pratap Singh Kairon - Punjab politician
- Shalabh Kumar - Indian American industrialist and a philanthropist, BS Electronics Engineering (1969)
- Vanya Mishra - Model and Miss India 2012
- Sunil Saigal - Dean, Newark College of Engineering at New Jersey Institute of Technology (NJIT), BE Civil (1978).
- Steve Sanghi - CEO of Microchip Technology BE Electronics (1975)
- K. K. Aggarwal - former Chairman of NBA, MHRD and founder vice chancellor of Guru Gobind Singh Indraprastha University
- Vandana Verma - Space Roboticist at NASA
- Tim Guleri - American Venture Capitalist.
- Anup Chandra Pandey - Former Election Commissioner of India.
- Er. VK Luthra-Chief Engineer- MED Jammu & Kashmir. B.E Prod 1976
- Ritu Maheshwari, IAS - CEO, Noida Authority
- Deepak Bhatia, CTO of The Hershey Company (BE Mech - 1995)
- Balbir Dhillon, Head of Audi India (BE Mech - 1995)
