= Sierra Ventures =

American venture capital firm

- Type: Private
- Industry: Venture Capital
- Founded: 1982; 44 years ago
- Founder: Peter Wendell
- Headquarters: San Mateo, California, United States
- Key people: Mark Fernandes (Managing Director), Tim Guleri (Managing Director), Ben Yu (Managing Director)
- Services: Early stage investment
- Website: www.sierraventures.com

Sierra Ventures is an American venture capital firm based in San Mateo, California. It targets startups in sectors including enterprise tech, artificial intelligence, cybersecurity and healthcare.

Sierra Ventures’ CXO Advisory Board is composed of more than seventy-five Fortune 1000 CIOs, CTOs, CMOs, and CISOs and has advised portfolio companies since 2006.

== History ==
The firm was founded by Peter Wendell in 1982 in Menlo Park, California. Early investments included Healtheon, Intuit, Micromuse, and StrataCom.

The firm is run by managing directors Mark Fernandes, Tim Guleri, and Ben Yu and is based in San Mateo, California. In 2024, the firm added a 4th managing partner, Shashank Saxena.

== Investments ==
As of 2024, Sierra Ventures had invested over $2 billion. The firm focuses on Seed and Series A-stage companies with a typical investment between $1 and $3.5 million for seed and $4 and $8 million for a Series A.

Sierra Ventures’ CXO Advisory Board, a group of Global 1000 Chief Information, Technology, Data, Security, and other technology focused Officers and IT executives, advises on the firm's strategic investment decisions. The board also counsels portfolio companies on how to scale and adapt as necessary.

Sierra Ventures is currently investing out of its thirteenth fund, which is focused on early-stage software startups and closed in 2023 with $265 million. The firm's previous two funds closed at $215 million and $170 million.

Some notable past investments include:

- Adometry – online advertising attribution company, acquired by Google in 2014.
- Applitools - AI-based visual test automation software company, acquired in 2023 by Thoma Bravo for $250 million.
- AuthenTec – mobile security company, acquired in 2012 by Apple for $365 million.
- Bina Technologies – big data science platform for researchers and clinicians, acquired in 2014 by Roche.
- Deep Lens - a patient recruitment platform for oncology-focused clinical trials, acquired by Paradigm in 2023 for an undisclosed sum.
- Frontbridge – electronic messaging and security services provider, acquired in 2005 by Microsoft.
- Greenplum – database analytics and software developer, acquired in 2010 by Dell EMC.
- Healtheon – online healthcare resource, merged with WebMD in 1999.
- Intuit – business and financial software company, went public in 1993; now valued at over $55 billion.
- Intuitive Surgical – surgical robotic developer, went public in 2000; as of July 2019, the company has a market capitalization of over $60 billion.
- InvenSense – MotionTracking sensor chip provider, acquired by TDK in 2016 for $1.3 billion.
- Lemonaid Health - virtual care and pharmacy provider, acquired by 23andMe in 2021 for $400 million.
- MakeMyTrip – India-based online travel company, went public in 2010.
- Micromuse – provider of network management software, acquired by IBM in 2005 for $865 million.
- Nexgate – cloud-based social web security, acquired in 2014 by Proofpoint for $35 million.
- NextInput – provider of micro-electromechanical systems (MEMS)-based sensing solutions for human-machine interface (HMI), acquired in 2021 by Qorvo.
- OnLink – provider of eCommerce sales and marketing applications, acquired by Siebel Systems in 2000 for approximately $607.5 million.
- Ooyala – developer of video content workflow management systems, acquired in 2012 by Telstra for $43 million.
- Quillbot - AI writing platform, acquired by Course Hero in 2021 for an undisclosed amount.
- Quinta – developer of next-generation data-storage technology, acquired by Seagate Technology in 1997 for $325 million.
- Redlock – cloud security software developer, acquired in 2018 by Palo Alto Networks for $173 million.
- Shape Security – fraud prevention platform, acquired by F5 in 2019 for $1 billion.
- Sourcefire – network security hardware and software developer, acquired in 2013 by Cisco.
- StrataCom – supplier of Asynchronous Transfer Mode (ATM) and Frame Relay high-speed wide area network (WAN) switching equipment, acquired in 1996 by Cisco for approximately $4 billion.
- Tempo – AI-enhanced calendar application, acquired in 2015 by Salesforce.
- Theravance Biopharma – biopharmaceutical company, went public in 2014.
- Treasure Data – cloud-based data collection, storage and analysis services, acquired in 2018 by ARM for $600 million.
- Teradata – provider of database and analytics-related software and services, acquired by NCR Corporation in 1991 for $250 million; subsequently spun out by NCR in 2007 and now trades on the NYSE (symbol TDC) with a $3B market cap.
- Terayon – developer of cable modem systems for broadband access, went public in 1998.
- Ximalaya – Chinese audio platform.
- Zimperium – enterprise mobile security platform, acquired in 2022 by Liberty Security Capital for $525 million.
