= Appu Ghar (Gurgaon) =

Water park in Gurgaon, India

Appu Ghar Gurgaon Water Park
- Logo of Appu Ghar, Gurgaon

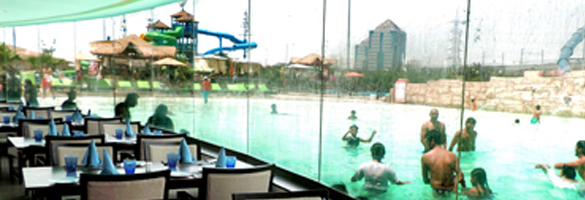
- Low tide water ride at Appu Ghar
- Interactive map of Appu Ghar Gurgaon Water Park
- Location: Gurgaon, Haryana, India
- Coordinates: 28.460256°N 77.072060°E
- Opened: April 2014
- Owner: EOD Amusement Pvt. Limited
- Theme: Beach
- Operating season: Year-round
- Area: 42.0 acres (170,000 m^{2})

Attractions
- Total: 15 (as of 2018)
- Water rides: 15
- Website: appughargurgaon.com

Appu Ghar a.k.a Oysters Water Park was a one million square foot, beach-themed, water park in Gurgaon in the Indian state of Haryana. It offered 15 water rides and banquet facilities for up to 3,500 guests. It is owned by EOD Amusement Pvt. Limited and opened in 2014 after the original Appu Ghar amusement park of the company that was operating in nearby Delhi's Pragati Maidan, closed down in 2008.

In 2022, lease authorities sealed the park due to lease dues and penalties amounting to several crores of rupees remaining unpaid by the owner. In November 2025, the Municipal Corporation of Gurgaon (MCG) sealed it again because of unpaid property-tax dues exceeding Rs.7.43 crore.

As of January 2026, Appu Ghar isn't functioning. According to available information it is currently insolvent, and under resolution processing for insolvency (Corporate Insolvency Resolution Process, CIRP) instituted by the Insolvency and Bankruptcy Board of India (IBBI).

Consequently, to the disappointment of millions of fans, it is unlikely to open again.

== Rides at the water park ==
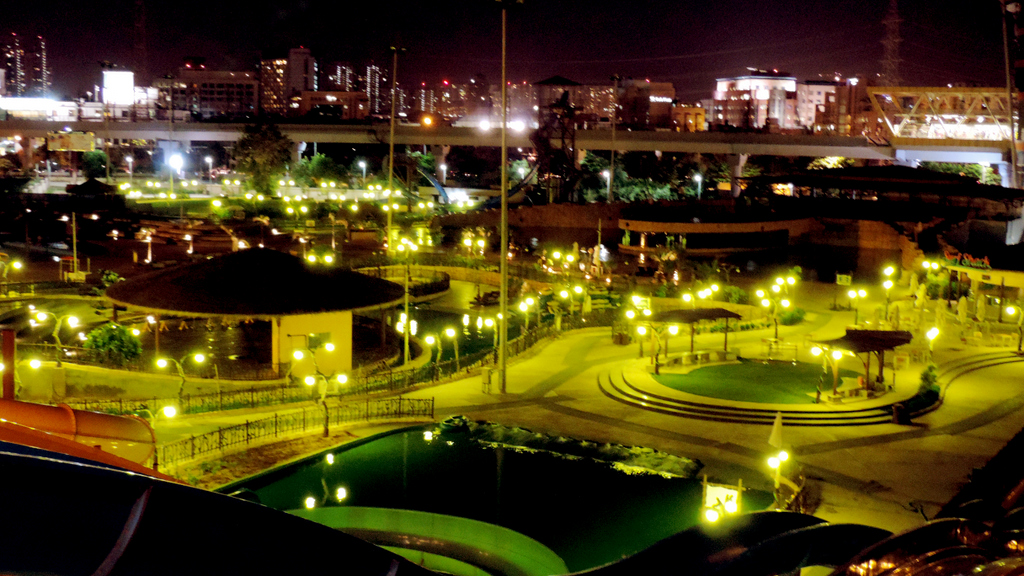
The AppuGhar Water Park in night

- Sky Fall: A 92-foot free fall drop. It is listed in the Limca Book of Records 2010 as the tallest water ride in India.
- Aqua Loop aka OMG - Oh My Gurgaon: Has vertical height of 20m (65.6168 feet) and 2.5 gravities of acceleration in two seconds. Speeds reach 60 km/h (37.282132538 mph) for a duration of 5 seconds.
- Wave Pool: An artificial beach with large waves.
- Open Float Slide aka Whirl Wind: A float slide with twists and turns.
- Crazy River: A 200m long water coaster.
- Rapid Racer: A 4 Lane Racer Water Ride. Guests challenge each other for a race.
- Thunderstorm: A float slide with twists and turns and drops.
- Play Station aka Pirate Station: A 16 platform station with different water rides and a pool.
- Lazy River: Crosses the park with slow flowing water.

== Restaurants ==
The theme park has 5 restaurants that offer variety of food options to the visitors.

- Low Tide Buffet Restro: A ship themed restaurant located on Wave Pool. Cuisines include Italian, Asian, Chinese, North Indian and Continental with drinks.
- Rice In The Bowl: Rice with chana/rajma/kadhi
- Oysters Bread Co.: Cakes, breads and bespoke desserts, tarts and muffins

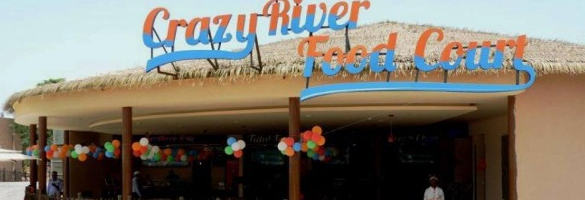
Crazy River Food court

- Crazy River Food Court: Cuisines ranging from Indian, Oriental, Continental, simple beach/street food with cocktails and mocktails
- Dimsum Cart: Vegetarian and non-vegetarian dumplings
- Hi – Tide Bar: A Bar and grill
- Liquid Dukan: Bar

== Recognition ==
- Right Choice Award 2016.
- National Record 2014 for Tallest Water Ride.
