= Asian Games Village =

Asian Games Village may refer to:

- Asian Games Village (Beijing)
- Asian Games Village (New Delhi)
