= Hall of Nations =

Former building in New Delhi, India

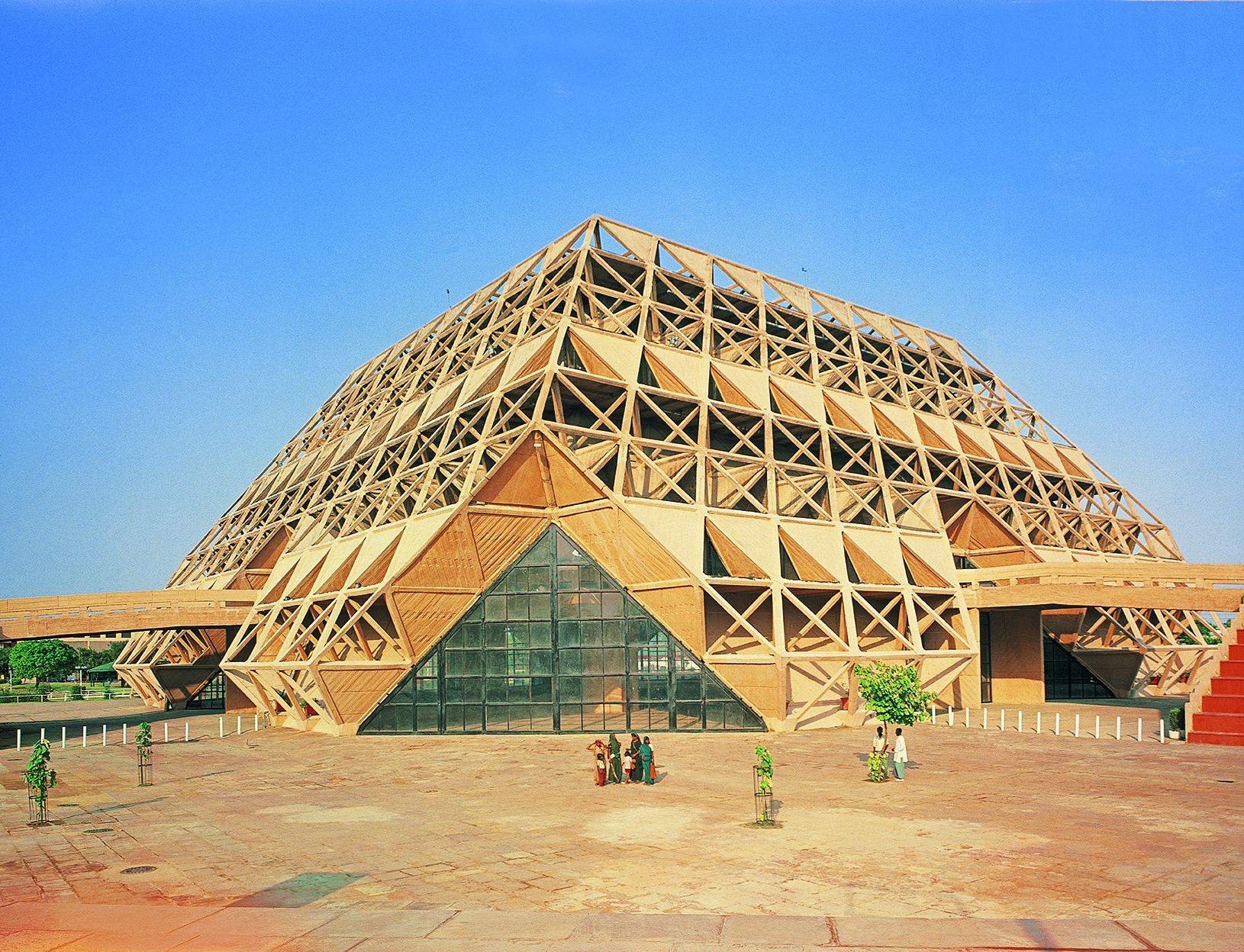
- Hall of Nations in 2008

General information
- Status: Demolished
- Type: Exhibition center
- Architectural style: Brutalist
- Location: New Delhi, Delhi, India
- Coordinates: 28°37′11″N 77°14′33″E
- Opened: 1972; 54 years ago
- Demolished: 2017; 9 years ago

Design and construction
- Architect: Raj Rewal
- Engineer: Mahendra Raj

The Hall of Nations was an iconic exhibition hall inaugurated in 1972 as part of the Pragati Maidan complex in New Delhi, India. It was built to commemorate 25 years of Indian independence.

Inaugurated by then-Prime Minister Indira Gandhi for the India International Trade Fair called Asia 72, it was the world’s first and, at the time, the largest-span space-frame structure built in reinforced concrete. The Hall of Nations comprised a group of four halls of varying sizes, interconnected by a system of ramps. They were designed by architect Raj Rewal, who was later bestowed with a gold medal by the Indian Institute of Architects in 1989.

In 2017, the Hall of Nations was demolished, along with Halls 1 through 6 and 14 through 20, state pavilions, and neighbouring landmarks such as the Hall of Industries and the Nehru Pavilion, to make way for a new exhibition and convention center. This new complex, named Bharat Mandapam, stands on the site of the former Hall of Nations.

The demolition of the Hall of Nations ignited significant public outcry and criticism from conservationists and the general public alike. Celebrated for its architectural innovation and historical significance, the Hall of Nations held a unique place in India’s modern architectural heritage. Its demolition by the India Trade Promotion Organisation (ITPO) occurred while legal proceedings were still underway to determine its heritage status.

== History ==
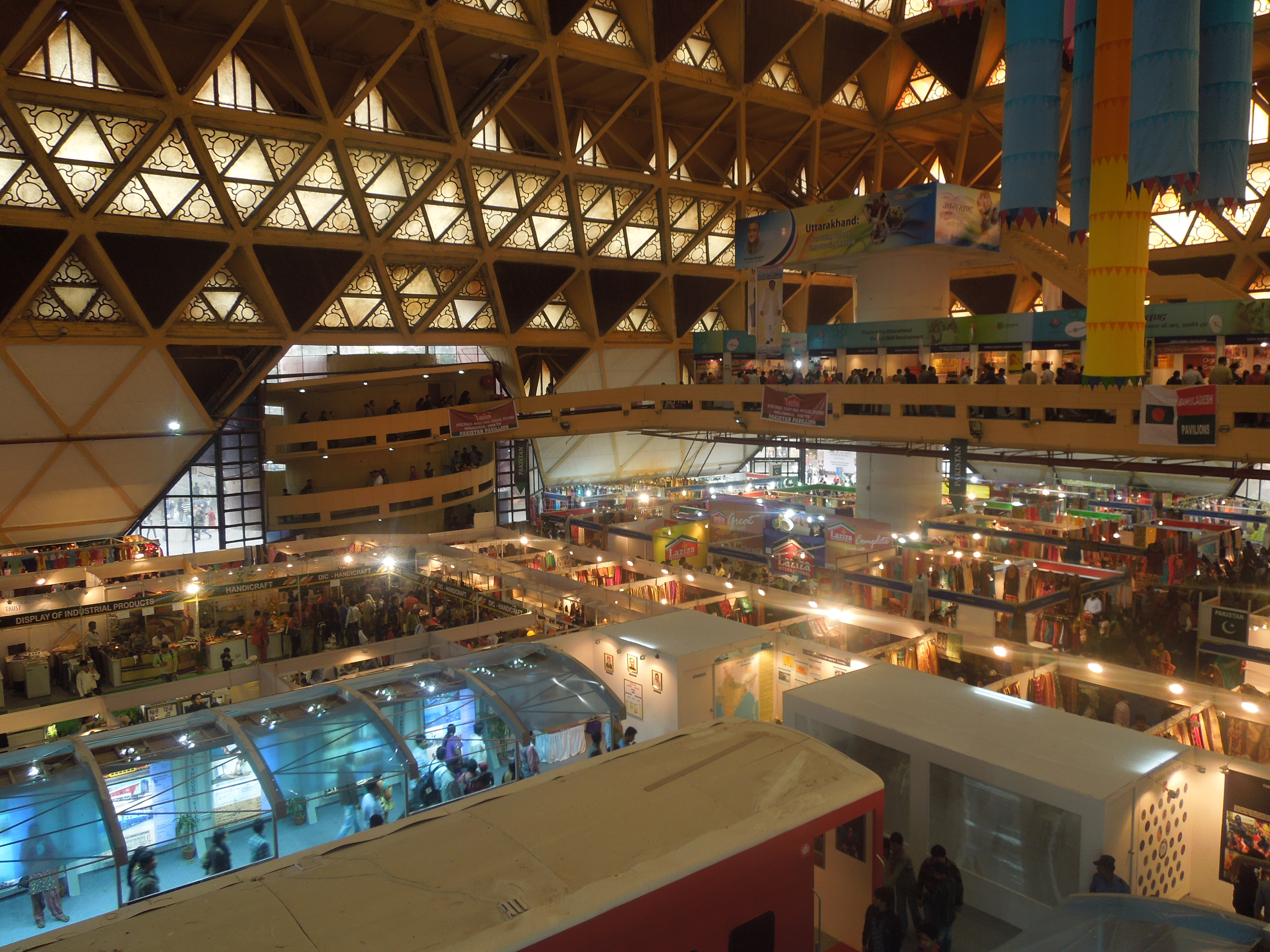
Interior view of the Hall of Nations during the 2012 edition of the India International Trade Fair

It was designed by the Indian architect Raj Rewal, and structurally engineered by Mahendra Raj. The hall served as a venue for trade fair exhibitions. The construction took 22 months and was subsequently deemed the venue for the 1972 International Trade Fair.

As per The Museum of Modern Art (MoMA), it was a structure "built in a time of great optimism for the future, both structures were seminal in forging a new, modern identity for Indian society and architecture. They are architectural masterpieces and important witnesses of an important chapter of Indian history."

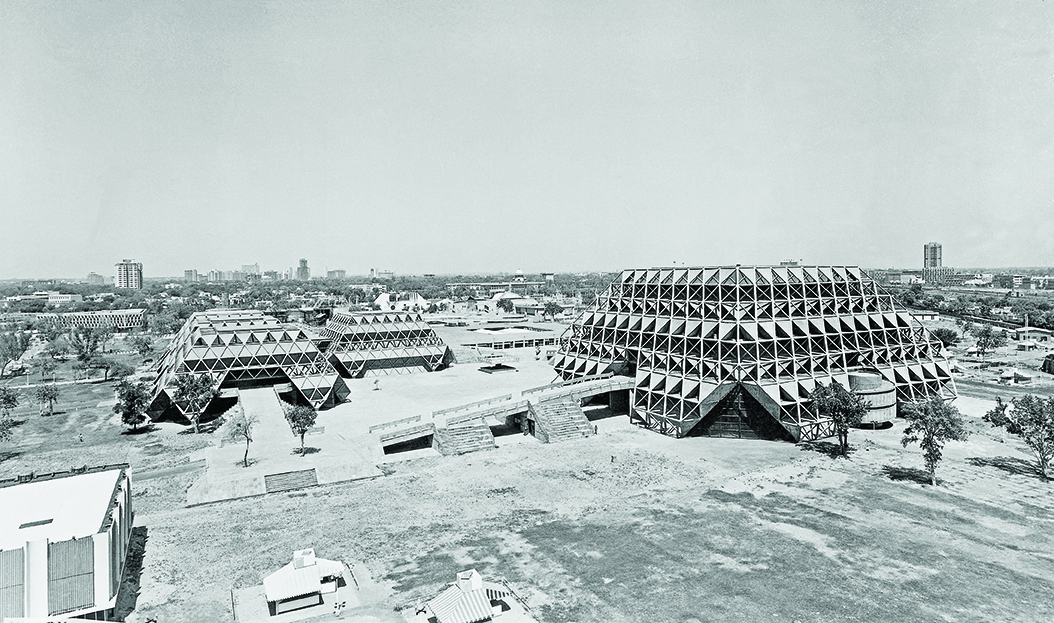
Halls of Nations comprised a group of four halls, connected through ramps

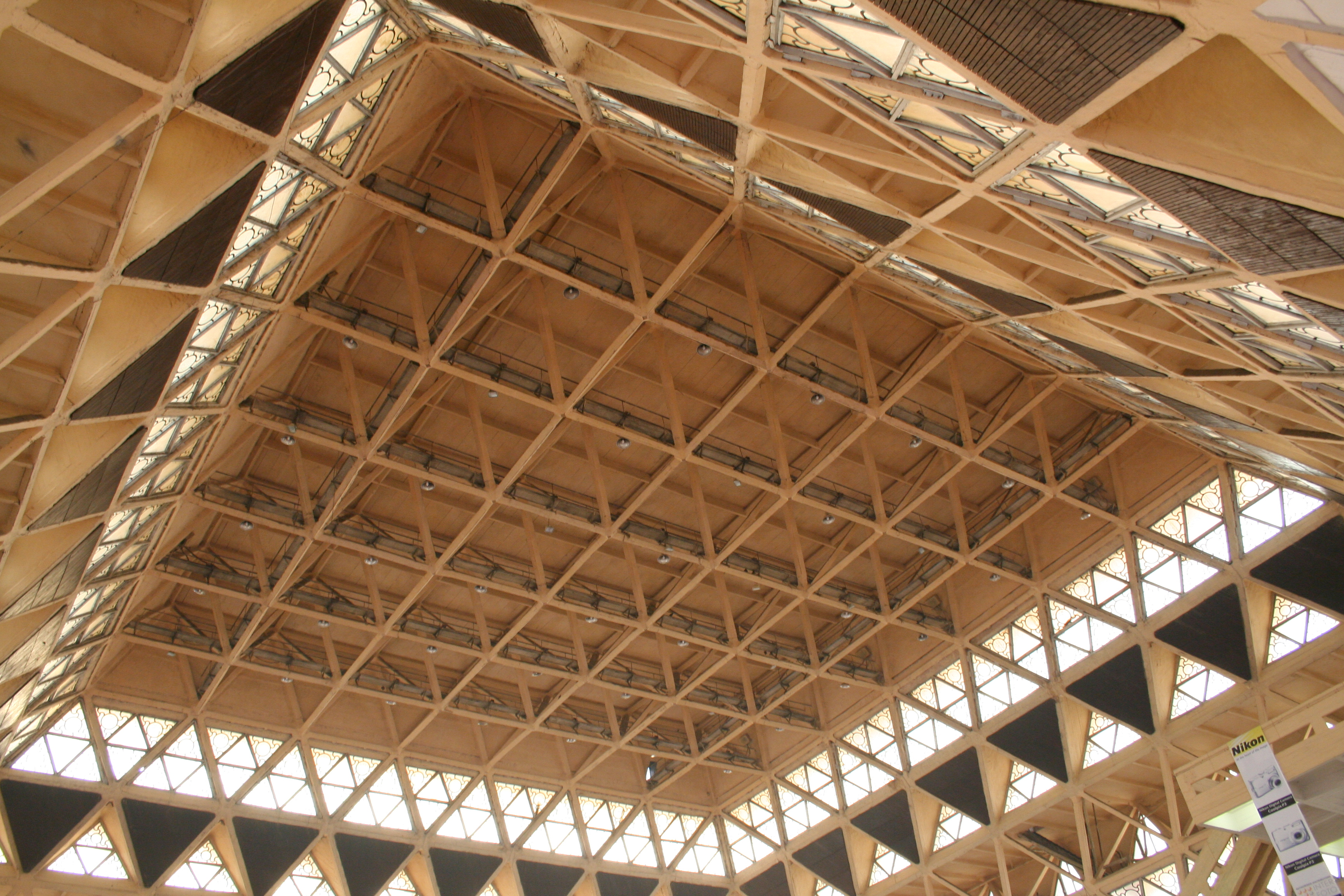
Ceiling of the Hall of Nations

When the demolition of the Hall of Nations as part of the redevelopment plans were revealed in November 2015, it led to protest not merely by local architects but also by museums like the MoMA; the Centre Pompidou in Paris requested the Government of India to consider preserving the complex of buildings as heritage structures.

Legal interventions were still ongoing in the Delhi High Court when the structure was demolished overnight in April 2017. The demolition of the building, which was considered iconic for its architecture, led to widespread national and global disapproval. It was described in The New York Times as a brutalist masterpiece and one of the world's largest-span space frame concrete structures, when built.
