= Appu Ghar =

Amusement park in New Delhi, India

- Interactive map of Appu Ghar
- Location: New Delhi, Delhi, India
- Coordinates: 28.616813°N 77.243359°E
- Opened: 19 November 1984
- Closed: 17 February 2008
- Owner: International Amusement Limited
- General manager: Gian Vijeshwar
- Theme: Animal, water, winter sports, Haunted house
- Operating season: Year-round
- Attendance: 1,825,000 (2006)
- Area: 15.5 acres (63,000 m^{2})

Attractions
- Total: 22 (as of 2006)
- Water rides: 4

Appu Ghar was an amusement park operated by International Amusement Limited, located in Pragati Maidan, New Delhi, India. It was spread over 15.5 acres (63,000 m^{2}) and was India's first amusement park. It was established in 1984 to commemorate the 1982 Asian Games, and was inaugurated on 19 November 1984 by then-Prime Minister of India, Rajiv Gandhi. The park closed down in 2008 after a legal ruling allocating the land for government use.

== Name ==
Appu Ghar was named after its mascot, an elephant named "Appu", while "Ghar" means house in Hindi. Appu was a live elephant mascot that became the star of the 1982 Asian Games held in New Delhi.

== History ==
India's first amusement park was inaugurated in 1984 by International Amusement Ltd. (IAL) headed by Suresh Chawla, who orchestrated the entire project of APPU GHAR with Trade Fair Authority of India (TFAI) rebranded now as India Trade Promotion Organisation (ITPO), Narinder Malik, a Sweden-based NRI and Gian Vijeshwar, another Sweden-based NRI with an aim to provide free access to underprivileged children. It was inaugurated on 19 November 1984 by Rajiv Gandhi then Indian Prime Minister, after his mother Indira Gandhi's assassination on her birthday, this was his first public appearance. Appu Ghar quickly became a crowd puller for the residents of the Indian capital as well as those of neighbouring towns.

It was formally opened under the aegis of International Amusement Ltd. (IAL), with its registered office at Gate No. 4, Pragati Maidan. The park was opened under a very tight schedule as planned on 14 November 1984.

The India Trade Promotion Organization (ITPO), which owns Pragati Maidan, leased the land to IAL for three years in 1984 to run and operate Appu Ghar. subsequently, ITPO kept on tending the lease to IAL till November 1999, when it last expired.

In 1999, ITPO asked IAL to vacate the land, at which point the private firm sought legal arbitration with ITPO to continue with Appu Ghar. Meanwhile, with the Supreme Court of India urgent needing land for extension along with the Delhi Metro Rail Corporation for construction of the Delhi Metro's Pragati Maidan metro station, the Government allocated the land to both the parties. In 2007, the Supreme Court finally ratified the Government's decision to hand over the land from IAL, paving the way for Appu Ghar's eventual closure on 17 February 2008.

== Appu Ghar Group ==
The Appu Ghar Group/International Amusement Ltd. also has a mix of amusement and commercial activities in Noida, The Great India Place and Worlds of Wonder; Adventure Island a similar project on a 62-acre parcel of land in Metro Walk, Rohini, Delhi. And finally Appu Ghar Jaipur, a 300-acre project currently under construction in Rajasthan.

== Major attractions ==
The major attractions at Appu Ghar in Pragati Maidan were:

- Various rides for children
- Swinging Sensations – This part features several rides and games like the Big Splash, the Roller Coaster, the Columbus Jhoola, the Giant Wheel, My Fair Lady and others.
- Games on snow like skiing, sledding, ice boating and others
- A water park spread over an area of 3.5 acres (14,000 m^{2})
- Swimming pool
- The Tower of Thrills
- Hi Waves
- Haunted House
