= New Delhi World Book Fair =

Indian book fair

- Status: Active
- Venue: Pragati Maidan
- Location: New Delhi
- Country: India
- Inaugurated: 1972
- Organizer: National Book Trust, India (NBT, India)
- Website: newdelhiworldbookfair.gov.in

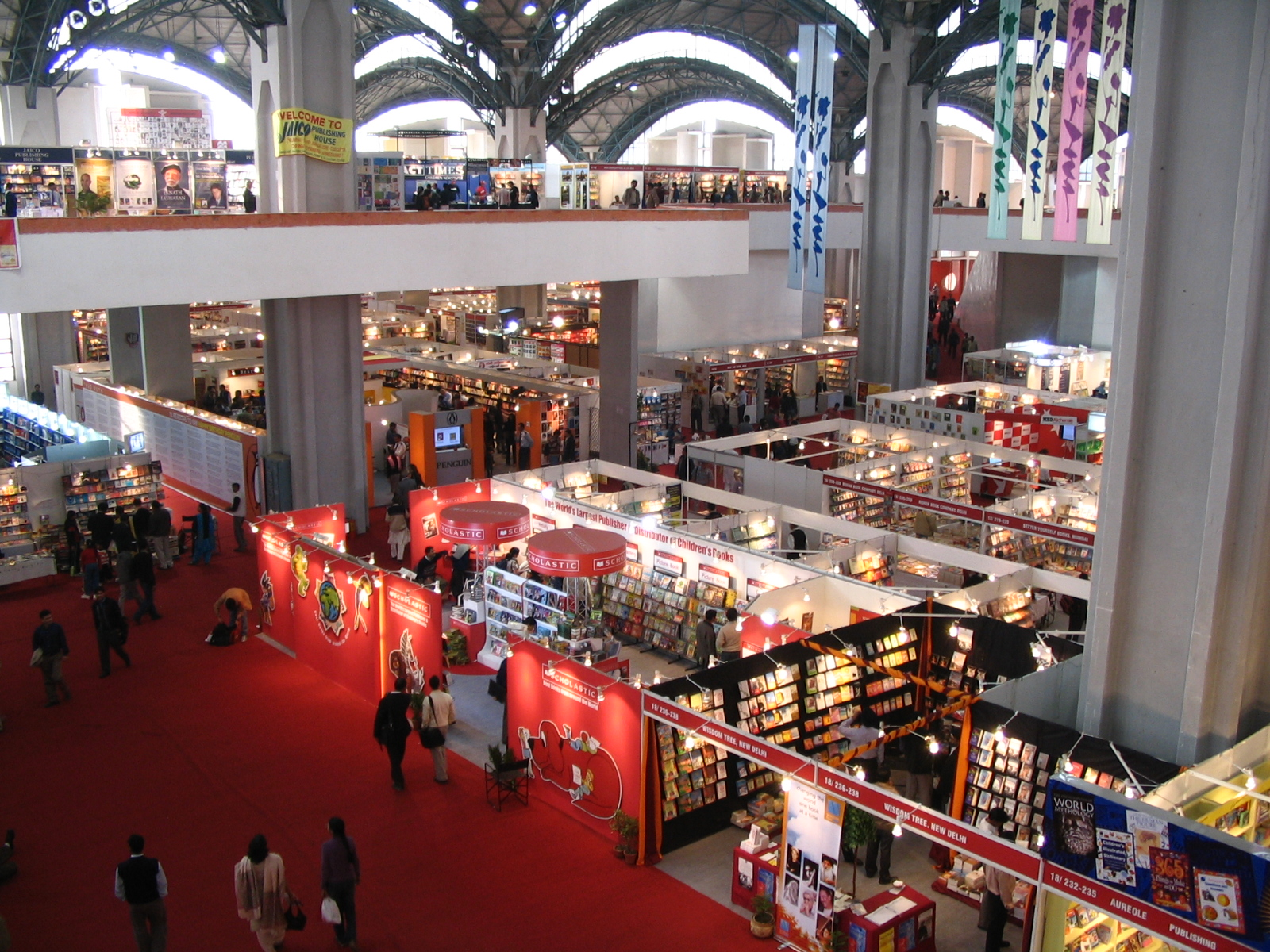
The Pragati Maidan hosts the World Book Fair every year.

The New Delhi World Book Fair, hosted at Pragati Maidan in New Delhi, is India's second oldest book fair after the Kolkata Book Fair. The first New Delhi World Book Fair was held from 18 March to 4 April 1972, in roughly 6790 m^{2} area with 200 participants. It was inaugurated by V. V. Giri, then President of India.

This annual (previously biennial) event takes place in winters and is organized by the National Book Trust (NBT), India. Since 2013, New Delhi World Book Fair is organised by National Book Trust (NBT) in association with India Trade Promotion Organisation (ITPO) annually at Pragati Maidan, New Delhi under MOU with ITPO.

Apart from publication, NBT promotes national readership policies and also supports the growing markets of neighbouring countries. The National Centre for Children's Literature (NCCL), a wing of NBT organizes events for children in the Children's pavilion to promote children's literature and the national 'Readers Club' movement.

India is the third biggest market for English publications with almost 12,000 publishers that publish around 90,000 titles a year in more than 18 languages. India's main publishing output is in the various Indian languages. The 2006 NDWBF witnessed 1,294 exhibitors on 38,000 m^{2} (2004: 1,205 / 32.546) and attracted 1 million visitors including those from foreign countries such as USA, Bangladesh, France, Iran, Israel, Italy, Japan, Canada, Malaysia, Mauritius, Nepal, Pakistan, Saudi Arabia, Singapore, Sri Lanka and Germany.

== Year-wise Fair Details ==
=== 2012 ===
The 20th New Delhi World Book Fair 2012 was held at Pragati Maidan, New Delhi from 25 February to 4 March 2012. The fair was inaugurated by the then HRD Minister Kapil Sibal. A corporate social responsibility initiative was undertaken by the publishing industry to launch the Pink Ribbon Book Tag at the Book Fair to support the Indian Cancer Society for a humanitarian cause. The theme of the 20th World Book Fair was 'Towards 100 years of Indian Cinema'.

=== 2013 ===
The 21st edition was scheduled during 4–10 February 2013 at Pragati Maidan. Under an MoU, the annual event was organized jointly by the National Book Trust (NBT) & India Trade Promotion Organization (ITPO) with the theme being 'Indigenous Voices: Mapping India's Folk & Tribal Literature' and France as the guest country.

The then HRD Minister Shashi Tharoor inaugurated the Fair, presided by Dr. Karan Singh, M.P. & Chairman Indian Council for Cultural Relations. Some of the events held for the first time included cosplay, school librarians' meet, artist & illustrators' gallery and the counsellors desk in the Children & Youth pavilion. An annual National Debut Youth Fiction Writers meet was also held to promote greater interest in readership.

=== 2014 ===
The 22nd edition was held during 15–23 February 2014 at Pragati Maidan. The Guest of Honour country was Poland, while the theme was 'Kathasagara: Celebrating Children's Literature'. New Delhi World Book Fair 2014 witnessed journalist Abhigyan Prakash launching a book titled, Development and Communication Morphosis written by Gaurav Sharma.

=== 2015 ===
The 23rd edition was held during 14–22 February 2015 at Pragati Maidan. The guest of honour country was Singapore with Korea as the focus country. The theme of the Fair was 'Suryodaya: Emerging voices from North East India'. The slogan of the fair was Books opening the mind. Doors opening the future. The Union HRD Minister Smriti Irani inaugurated the Fair, while HRD Minister of State Upendra Kushwaha inaugurated the Children's pavilion. National Book Trust under the Young India Library series was to put up for sale a new edition of a book on parables covering a new dimension of Swami Vivekananda for developing scientific temper in children.

=== 2016 ===
The 24th New Delhi World Book Fair was held during 9–17 January 2016, at Pragati Maidan, New Delhi with China as the Guest of Honour Country. The theme of the 2016 edition was cultural diversity 'Vivid Bharat - Diverse India'. The message of the Sino-Indo partnership for the New Delhi Book Fair 2016 was the connecting rainbow -"Renaissance of Civilizations- Understanding through exchanges".The Union HRD Minister Smriti Irani inaugurated the fair.

=== 2017 ===
The 25th New Delhi World Book Fair was organised between 7–15 January at Pragati Maidan, New Delhi . The organizer of the NDWBF 2017 was National Book Trust- NBT, Ministry of Human resources Development, Government of India in collaboration with ITPO India Trade Promotion Organisation. The theme presentation of the 2017 edition was 'Manushi - Books Written on and by Women'. The focus of the Book Fair was on the 'Culture of Reading'. The Minister of State HRD Dr Mahenra Nsth Pandey inaugurated the fair. The highlights of the fair included 60 years of NBT history in the theme pavilion & children activities in the Children Pavilion including activities to celebrate Swami Vivekananda's birth anniversary as 'National Youth Day' on 12 January 2017. The book fair witnessed author interactions, book releases, national seminars on -Best practices in Developing Reading skills & Research perspective in Developing Content for Children". The Director of the NDWBF 2017 Dr Rita Chowdhury, Director of NBT, and under chairmanship of Shri Baldeo Bhai Sharma, Chairman of National Book Trust, Ministry of Human Resource Development, Government of India overlooked the functioning of the fair.

=== 2018 ===
The 26th New Delhi World Book Fair, 6–14 January at Pragati Maidan, New Delhi, was organised by the National Book Trust (NBT) in association with India Trade Promotion Organisation. The themed was environmental issues such as climate change, global warming, and water pollution. Guest of honor country was 'European Union'.

=== 2019 ===
The 27th New Delhi World Book Fair was held at Pragati Maidan, New Delhi 5–13 January. The theme of the fair was ‘Books for Readers with Special Needs’ and Sharjah is the ‘guest of honours’ country.

=== 2020 ===
For 2020, the book fair moved to a virtual format due to the COVID-19 pandemic and was held 30–31 October 2020.

== See also ==
- Literary festival
