= Abhigyan Prakash =

Indian journalist

- Born: Varanasi

Abhigyan Prakash is Senior Executive Editor of ABP News. and columnist. He is also an Op-ed columnist for the Hindi newspaper Dainik Jagran. Prakash was on the prize jury of the November 2013 Press Council of India "National Awards for Excellence in Journalism" given to deserving journalists. In New Delhi World Book Fair 2014, Prakash launched the book Development and Communication Morphosis authored by Gaurav Sharma.

== Career ==
Prakash has been a reporter since 1994. He began his career with newspapers like Times of India and The Pioneer.

From 1996, Prakash provided live election analysis for state and parliamentary elections. With his contributions to Election Point and Vote Ki Jung, he has been used as a news contributor to explain the outcomes of Indian Elections.

From 1997, he became an anchor for Star News, hosting shows in English.

In 2003, he helped break the Telgi scam which launched NDTV India and won the President’s medal.

On NEWSPOINT and MUKABALA, he reported on issues such as inflation, energy, healthcare, and farmers’ distress.

Prakash is also an opinion columnist for publications like Dainik Bhaskar, Outlook, Dainik Jagran and The Pioneer.
