= Metro Walk (Delhi) =

Coordinates: 28.723984°N 77.113214°E

- Location: Sector 10, Rohini, Delhi, India
- Developer: Appu Ghar Group; Unitech Group
- Floor area: 221,000 sq ft (20,500 m^{2})

Metro Walk is an open shopping mall which includes Adventure Island as an amusement park located in Rohini, Delhi, India.

== Features ==
Metro Walk was developed by the Appu Ghar Group and the Unitech Group. It is located in Sector 10 of Rohini, adjacent to Rithala metro station. The mall and amusement park were master planned by the Florida-based company Bose International. It has an 221,000 sq ft (20,500 m^{2}) outdoor shopping area which houses outlets of many leading national and international brands including Burger King, McDonald, Woodland, Decathlon, Pantaloons, Reebok and Nike. There are many stand-alone restaurants as well as food court kiosks. The amusement park, called Adventure Island, is spread over an area of 62 acres (250,000 m^{2}) and contains about 26 rides and attractions. A separate zone, designed along with Turner Network Television, is called Planet Pogo and houses a MAD theatre and Pogo plazas for children. A large lake acts as the separator between the mall building and the amusement park.
