= India International Trade Fair =

Annual exhibition in New Delhi

The India International Trade Fair is a major trade exhibition held annually in New Delhi, India, since its inception in 1980. It is a premier event organized by the India Trade Promotion Organization, the nodal trade promotion agency of the Government of India. The event is held between 14 and 27 November every year at Bharat Mandapam in New Delhi.

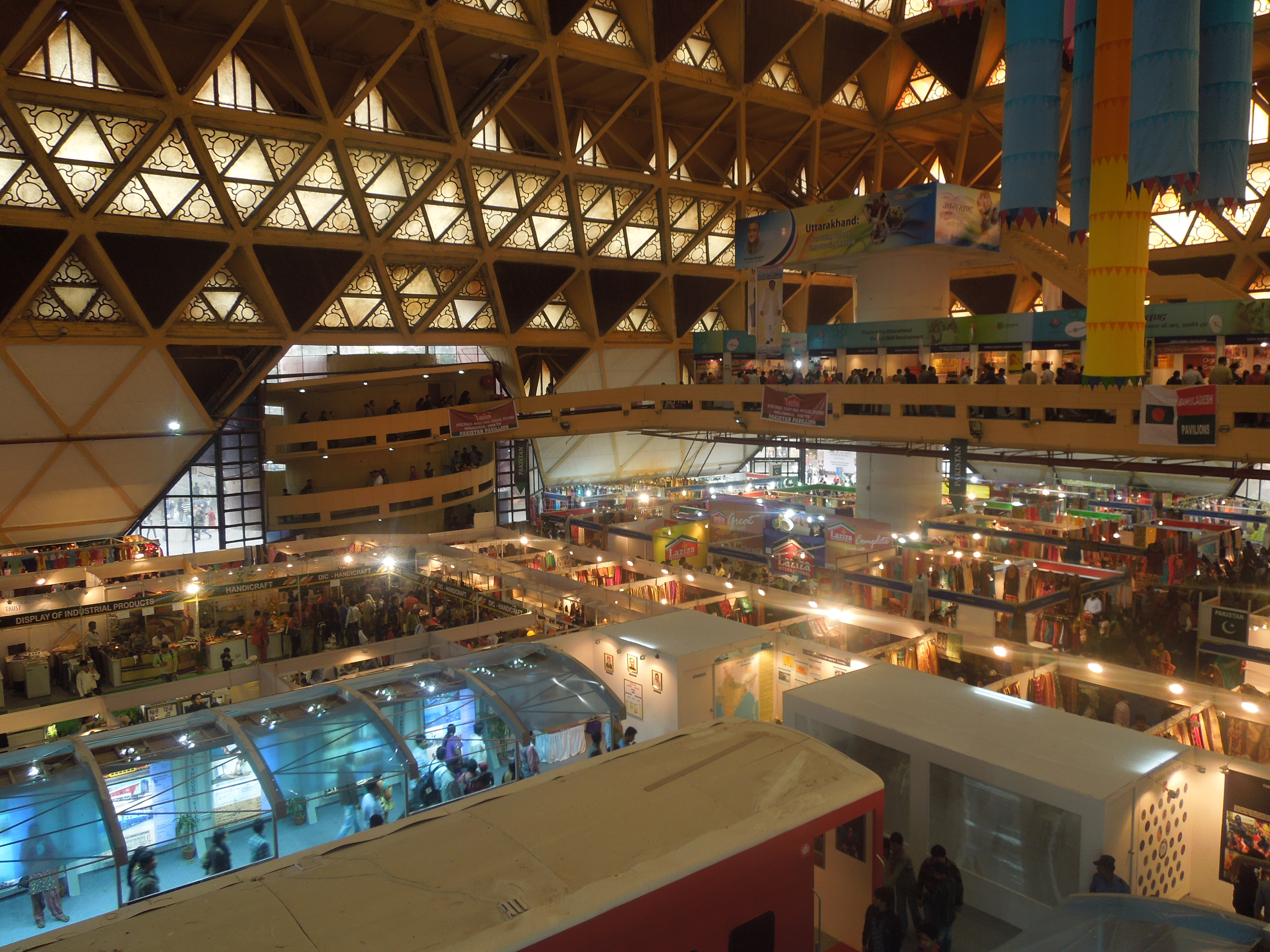
IITF-2012, Pragati Maidan (Hall-6; now demolished)

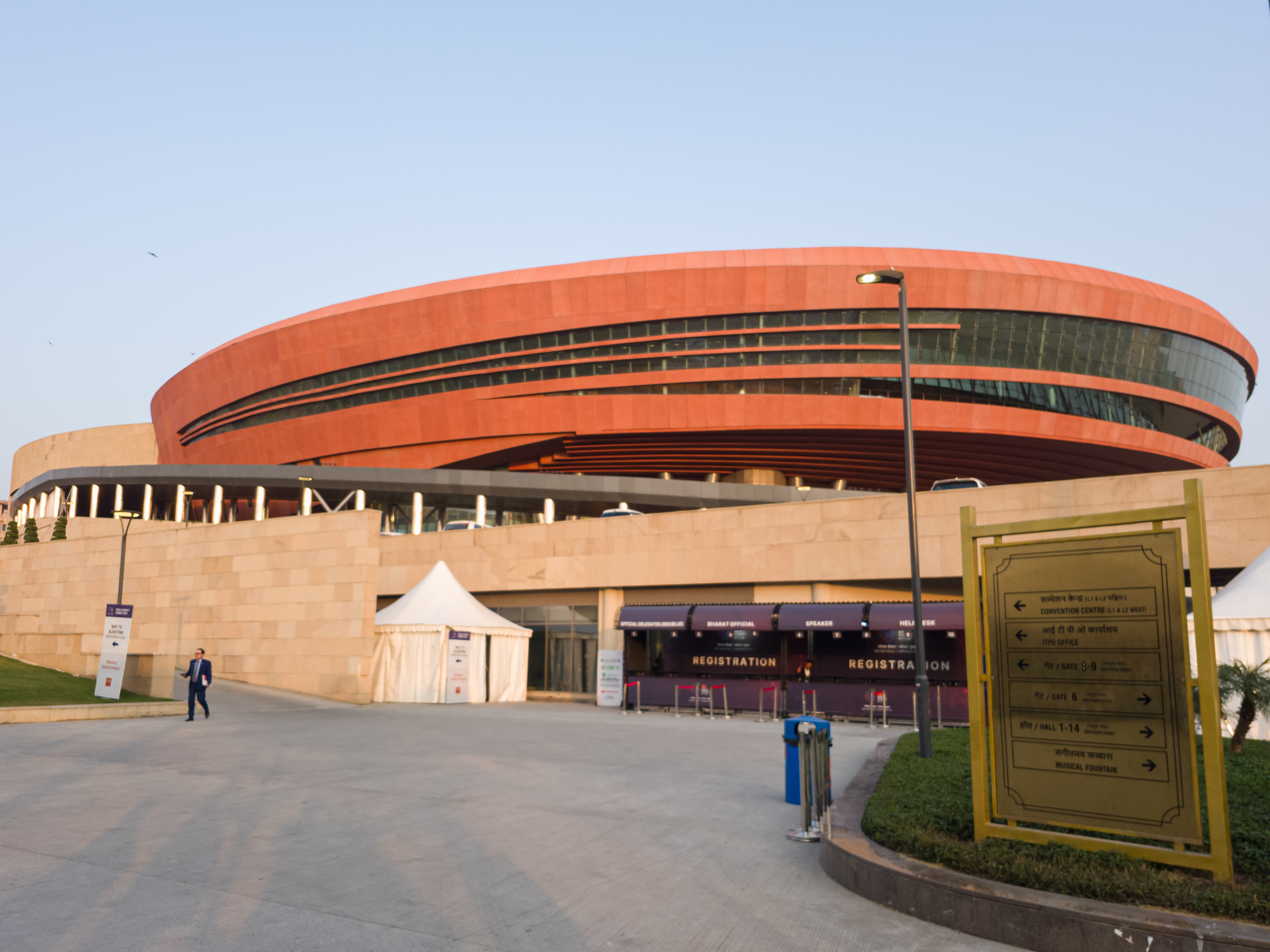
The New Venue of IITF, Bharat Mandapam

== Significance ==
IITF is a major tourist attraction. The annual event provides a common platform for the manufacturers, traders, exporters and importers. The fair displays comprise a wide range of products and services, including automobiles, coir products, jute, textiles, garments, household appliances, kitchen appliances, processed food, beverages, confectionery, pharmaceuticals, chemicals, cosmetics, skincare and health care products, telecommunication, power sector, electronic sector, furniture, home furnishings, sporting goods, toys, and engineering goods.

The 26th edition of IITF held in 2006 had around 7500 national and 350 international exhibiting companies. The fair attracted an audience of more than 3 million general visitors and 2,75,000 business visitors, including 91 delegations from 53 countries.

IITF 2014 included 6800 exhibitors displayed in an area of 94,300 square metres (1,015,000 sq ft). (gross) with 30 states and union territories participating as exclusive pavilions. In this edition, 299 foreign companies from 25 foreign countries displayed their products. Around 40,000 domestic business visitors and 63 foreign trade delegations from Afghanistan, Angola, Australia, Bangladesh, Brunei, Burkina Faso, Canada, China, Costa Rica, France, Germany, Ghana, Hong Kong, Iran, Indonesia, Japan, Kenya, Lesotho, Malawi, Malaysia, Mexico, Nepal, Nigeria, Oman had visited the fair. Over one million general visitors attended the exhibition.

The 36th edition of the popular India International Trade Fair (IITF) was held from 14 to 27 November 2016 at Pragati Maidan, New Delhi. The theme of this fair was Digital India.

== Gallery ==
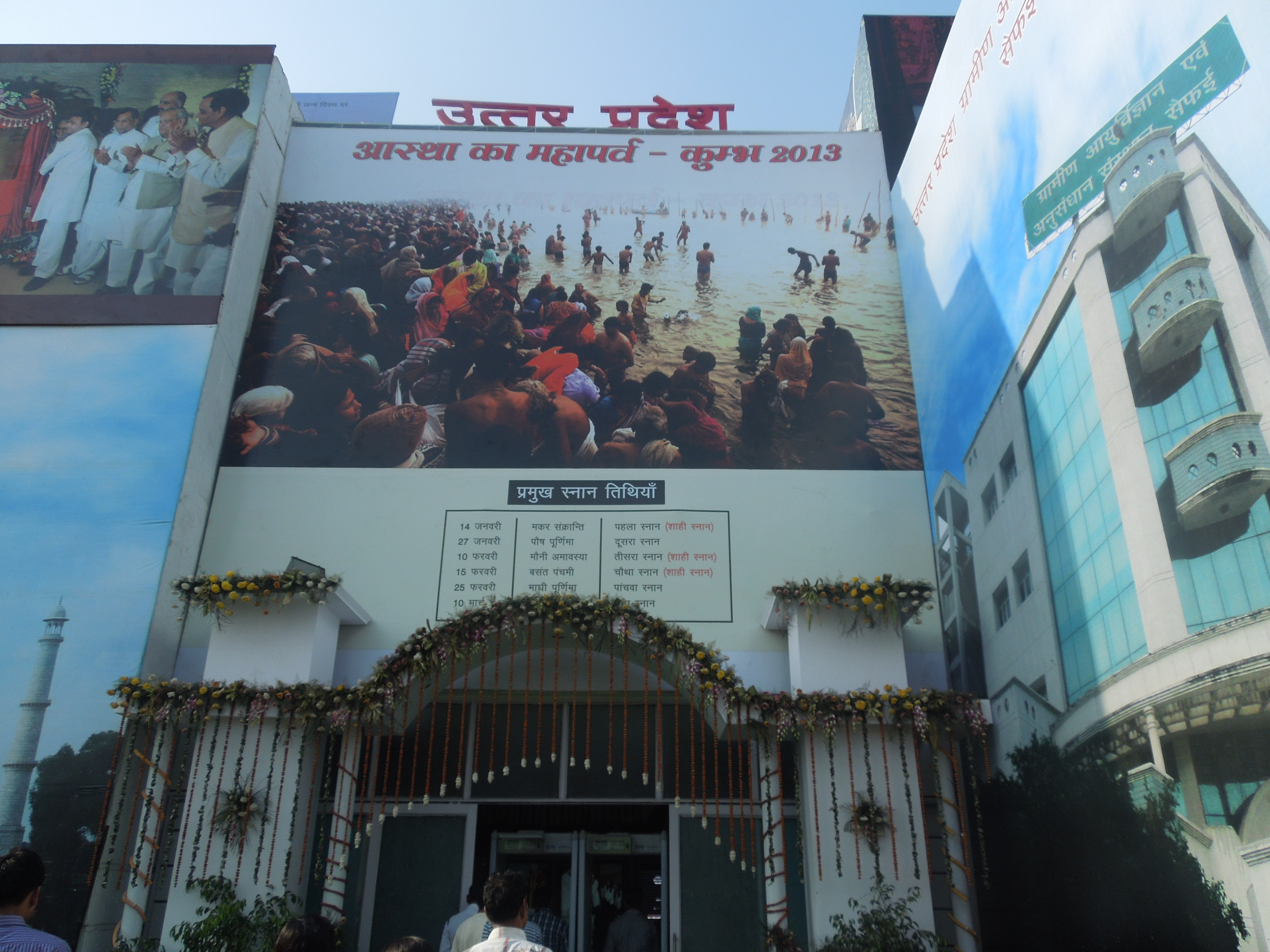

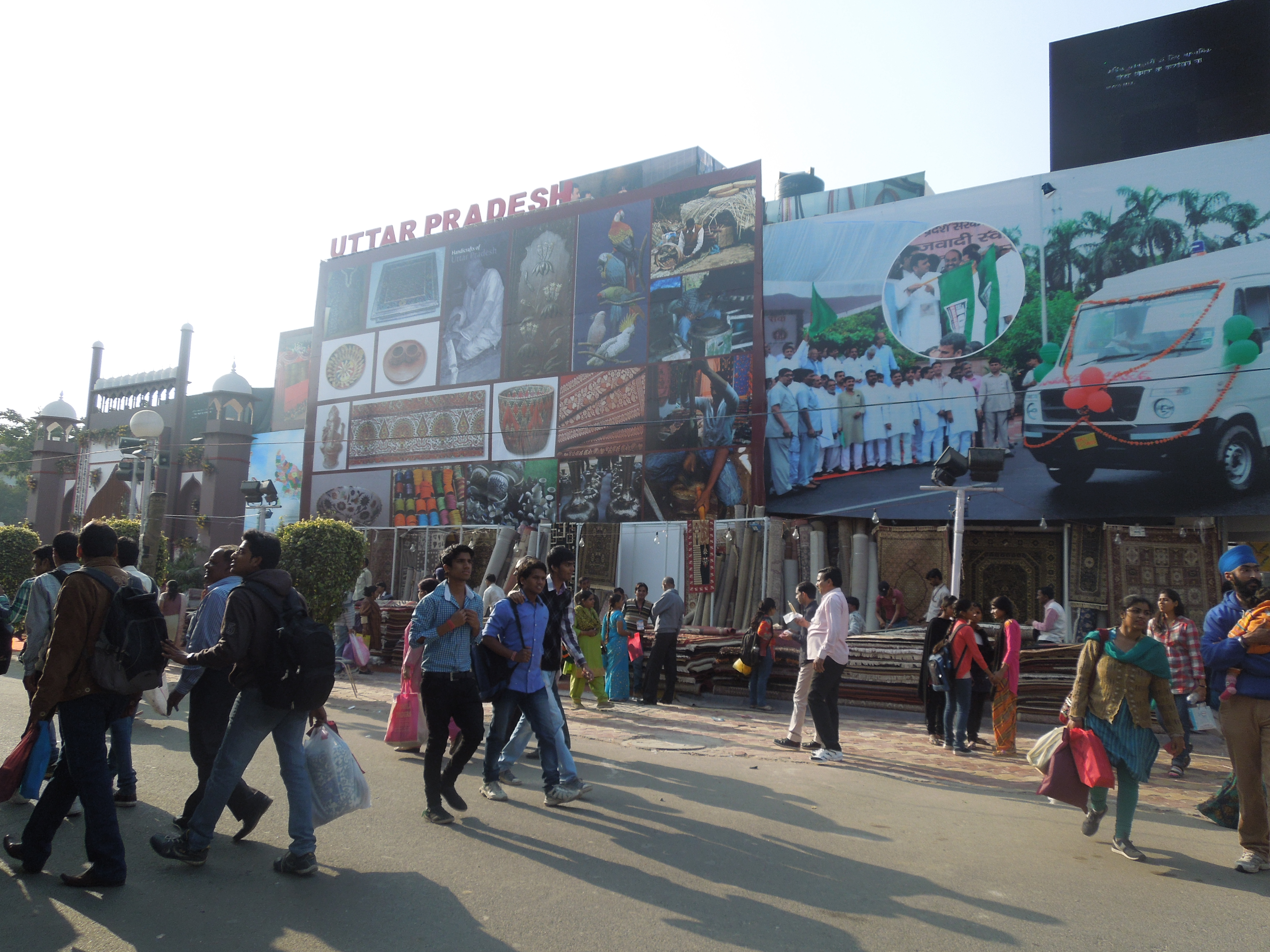

== See also ==
- Pragati Maidan
- India Trade Promotion Organization
