= India Trade Promotion Organisation =

Government organisation

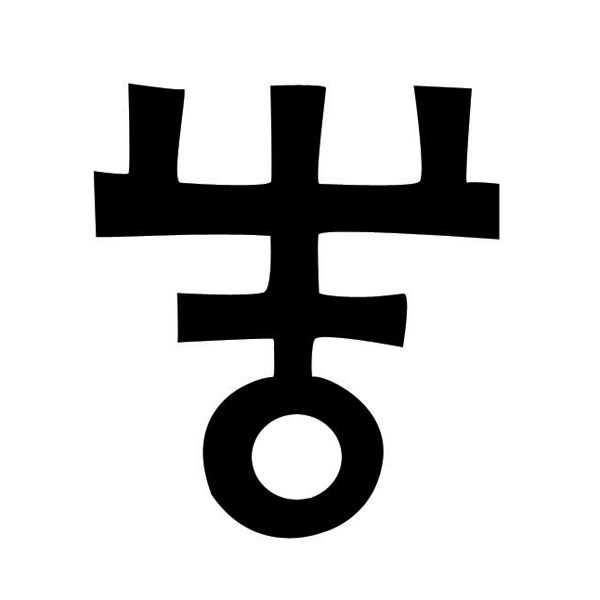
- Type: Government-owned enterprise
- Industry: Trading & Marketing Services
- Founded: 1 April 1977
- Headquarters: Pragati Bhawan, Pragati Maidan, New Delhi
- Key people: Jawed Ashraf , IFS (Retd.) (Chairman & MD) Neeraj Kharwal, IAS (ED)
- Revenue: ▲₹3,818.8 million (US$40 million) (2014–15) ▼₹3,765.2 million (US$39 million) (2015–16) (▲₹3,889.7 million (US$40 million) (2016–17)
- Net income: ▲₹2,078.5 million (US$22 million) (2014–15) ▼₹1,652.8 million (US$17 million) (2015–2016) ▲₹2,631.4 million (US$27 million) (2016–17)
- Owner: Government of India (100%)
- Number of employees: 442 (as of 31 March 2022)
- Subsidiaries: 1. TNTPO; 2. KTPO; 3. NCTI
- Website: www.itpo.gov.in

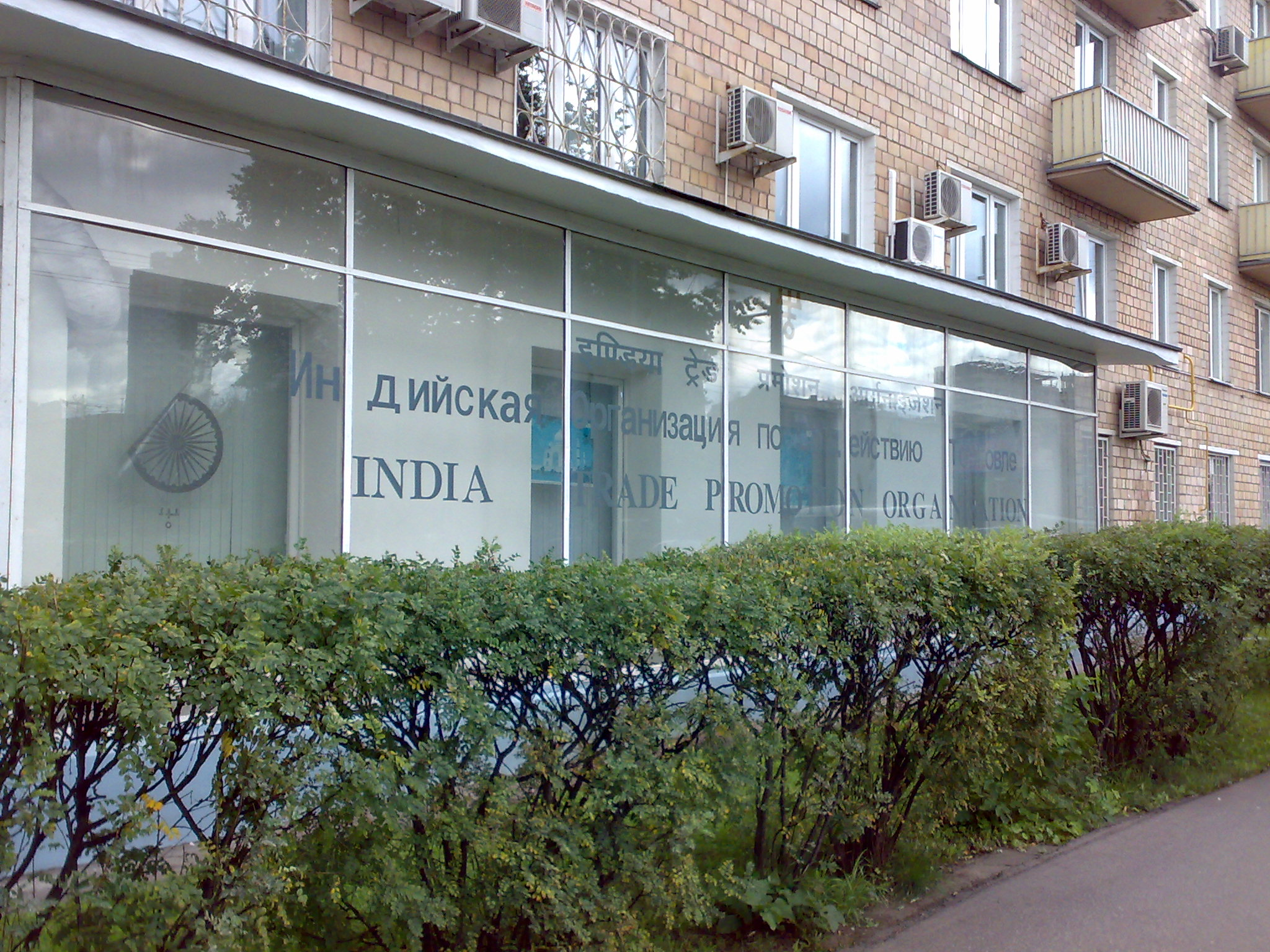
Erstwhile office of the India Trade Promotion Organisation in Moscow, Russia

India Trade Promotion Organisation (ITPO), headquartered at Pragati Maidan, is the nodal agency of the Government of India under aegis of the Ministry of Commerce and Industry for promoting country's external trade. ITPO is a Mini-Ratna Category-1 Central Public Sector Enterprise (CPSE) with 100 percent shareholding of Government of India.

In January 2016, ITPO appointed NBCC as Project Management Consultant (PMC) for Integrated Exhibition-cum-Convention Centre (IECC) project as part of Redevelopment of Pragati Maidan. The project garnered much media attention due to demolition of Hall of Nations and Nehru Pavilion by ITPO in April 2017, after approval from Delhi High Court. ITPO has awarded the IECC construction work to Shapoorji Pallonji Group for ₹2150 crores, making the project cost go over whopping ₹2600 crores. On 22 December 2017, Vice-President of India Venkaiah Naidu laid foundation stone of IECC project and Integrated Transit Corridor Development project at Pragati Maidan. On October 13, 2021, Prime Minister Shri Narendra Modi inaugurated New Exhibition Complex (Halls 2,3,4 & 5) and on June 19, 2022, Prime Minister Shri Narendra Modi dedicated the Pragati Maidan Integrated Transit Corridor to the nation. Prime Minister Shri Narendra Modi performed havan and inaugurated the grand ITPO Convention Centre on July 26, 2023, and named it Bharat Mandapam.

== Events of ITPO ==
At Pragati Maidan, New Delhi

1. India International Footwear Fair (IIFF) (27-29 July 2023)
2. India International Security Expo (IISE) (September/October 2023)
3. Delhi Book Fair Stationery Expo, Office Automation Expo, Corporate Gift Expo (29 July - 6 August 2023)
4. India International Trade Fair (14–27 November 2023)
5. Convergence India Expo & Smart City Expo (17-19 January 2024)
6. India Wellness Expo (17-19 January 2024)
7. New Delhi World Book Fair (10-18 February 2024)
8. Nakshatra (10-18 February 2024)
9. Aahar- The International Food & Hospitality Fair (5-9 March 2024)

Other Cities in India

1. East Himalayan Expo
2. India International Leather Fair, Chennai (1–3 February 2024)
3. India International Leather Fair, Kolkata
4. Tex Styles India, Kolkata

Outside India

- As proposed by ITPO board and approved by Govt. of India

Third Party Events

Many private companies, cooperatives and confederations organise prestigious fairs in Pragati Maidan such as

- Confederation of Indian Industries (CII)
- Federation of Indian Chambers of Commerce & Industry (FICCI)
- ABEC
- Pavilions & Interiors
- Inter Ads
- Exhibition India Group
- MEX Exhibitions
- Reed Manch Exhibitions
- International Trade and Exhibitions India
- UBM India
- Messe Frankfurt India
- Hannover Milano Fairs India

== History ==
India Trade Promotion Organisation (ITPO) was incorporated by merger of Trade Development Authority (TDA), a Registered Society under Ministry of Commerce & Industry, with Trade Fair Authority of India (TFAI) with effect from 1 January 1992. TFAI was earlier incorporated, under Section 25 of the Indian Companies Act, 1956, on 30 December 1976 by amalgamating 3 organisations of the Government of India viz. India International Trade Fair Organisation, Directorate of Exhibitions & Commercial Publicity and Indian Council of Trade Fairs & Exhibitions and commenced operations with effect from 1 March 1977.

ITPO, during its existence of more than 3 decades has played a proactive role in catalysing trade, investment and technology transfer processes. Its promotional tools include organising of fairs and exhibitions in India and abroad, Buyer-Seller Meets, Contact Promotion Programmes, Product Promotion Programmes, Promotion through Overseas Department Stores, Market Surveys and Information Dissemination.

Some of the structures in Pragati Maidan were designed by the best Architects of their times, like the following:

- Hall-6 (Hall of Nations), Hall 2-5 (Hall of Industries) and Nehru Pavilion were designed by iconic architect Raj Rewal along with architect Kuldip Singh in 1971–1972. They were demolished in 2017 to give way for Redevelopment of Pragati Maidan.
- Later on, Hall-14 (Hall of States) was designed by architect Raj Rewal in 1981–1982. This was also demolished in 2017 to give way for Redevelopment of Pragati Maidan.
- National Science Centre was designed by architect Achyut Kanvinde.
- Craft Museum was designed by architect Charles Correa.
- Hall-7 was designed by architect Rajinder Kumar.
- Hall-18 (Hall of Technology) was designed by eminent architectural firm Stein, Doshi & Bhalla Consultants. This was demolished in 2018 to give way for Redevelopment of Pragati Maidan.
- Phoolwari Convention Centre was designed by architect Jasbir Sachdev. This was demolished in 2017 to give way for Redevelopment of Pragati Maidan.
- Shakuntalam Theatre was designed by architect Ranjit Sabikhi. This was demolished in 2017 to give way for Redevelopment of Pragati Maidan.
- Erstwhile Hindustan Lever Pavilion (1961) was designed by architect Charles Correa.
- Erstwhile DCM pavilion (1972) was designed by architect Jasbir Sawhney.
- Erstwhile Ford Pavilion (1996) was designed by architect Sanjay Wadhwa.

== Sphere of Activities ==
ITPO has been managing the Pragati Maidan exhibition complex in New Delhi, which is spread over an area of 123.5 acres and has established it as a renowned destination for holding exhibitions, conventions, seminars, business meets and other trade promotion activities. The existing infrastructure of Pragati Maidan includes more than 16 exhibitions halls of about 65,000 sq.m. out of which 40,000 sq.m. is air-conditioned space. It also consists of additional open space of 32,000 sq.m., a modern air conditioned food plaza with seating capacity for 500 plus persons, open and covered auditoriums with a combined capacity for 5500 and 1000 persons respectively, lounge areas, business centre facilities, etc. The existing facilities are being used by Industry, various Ministries, Govt. Departments and State Governments to present their policies, initiatives and achievements by supporting/holding exhibitions, conventions and other trade related events.

ITPO has an extensive infrastructure as well as marketing and information facilities that are availed by both exporters and importers. ITPO had had overseas offices at New York City, Frankfurt, Tokyo, Moscow and São Paulo for pursuing opportunities for enhancement of India's trade and investment. However, all overseas offices are now closed by ITPO.

ITPO has four Regional Offices:

- Chennai
- Kolkata
- Mumbai

The Regional Offices, through their respective profile of activities, ensure a concerted and coordinated trade promotion drive throughout the country.

== Subsidiaries ==
ITPO has two subsidiaries namely Tamil Nadu Trade Promotion Organisation (TNTPO) and Karnataka Trade Promotion Organisation (KTPO) with share holding of 51 percent in each of them. With the commissioning of the state-of-the-art Chennai Trade Centre (CTC) in January 2001 and the Trade Centre Bangalore in September 2004, ITPO has successfully completed the first phase of the setting-up of modern exhibition facilities outside Delhi.

In FY 2015–2016, TNTPO and KTPO registered revenues of about ₹315 million and ₹48 million respectively and have reserves of about ₹1840 million and ₹390 million respectively.

The Chennai Trade Centre, which is now spread across 14,000 sqm, is planned to be expanded by addition of 6,000 sqm and ITPO is seeking approval from the board of the TNTPO for the same.

In 1995, ITPO launched 50:50 Joint subsidiary with National Informatics Centre (NIC) in the form of National Centre for Trade Information (NCTI), for collection and dissemination of trade data and improving Business Information Services to the business community, especially SME. In 2015–2016, NCTI registered operational loss of about ₹2 million and net negative assets of about ₹4 million.

ITPO had coordinated the construction of exhibition-cum-trade complex Maniram Dewan Trade Centre (Guwahati) for Assam Trade Promotion Organisation under 'Assistance to States for Developing Export Infrastructure and Allied Activities (ASIDE) Scheme, for facilitating trade in North-Eastern States.

International Trade and Convention Centre (Kerala) is proposed joint venture project of Indian Trade Promotion Organisation (ITPO) and Kerala Industrial Infrastructure Development Corporation (Kinfra) at 25 acres of land in the Kinfra Export Promotion Industrial Park in Kakkanad. The project would require investment of ₹1125 million, of which ₹31.25 crore each will be provided by the central and state governments and the remaining ₹50 crore will be mobilised via credit. The state government granted an in-principle approval for the project in 2012, but owing to the non-availability of funds it got delayed.

== Strategic Issues ==
ITPO is operating a trade portal Trade Portal of India having all trade related information including country profiles, product profiles, trade directory etc. ITPO is networking with International Organisation in the field of Trade and Commerce through membership or collaborative arrangements such as Memorandum of Understanding (MoU), ITPO is a founder member of Asian Trade Promotion Forum (ATPF) and participates in its Annual meets regularly.

Central Industrial Security Force (CISF) provide round-the-clock security at Pragati Maidan. Access control to the exhibitions area would also be monitored by another team of the squad with help from private security guards.

ITPO signed MoU with Federation of Indian Chambers of Commerce & Industry (FICCI) to collaborate on trade promotion. ITPO also signed MoU with the Confederation of Indian Industry (CII) in April 2011, directed towards a collective and well-directed effort to promote India's trade identifying the internal strengths of the respective organisations.

ITPO signed MoU with National Book Trust (NBT), India for conducting New Delhi World Book Fair every year, starting from February 2013.

In 2013, ITPO has commissioned the Indian Institute of Management, Ahmedabad (IIM-A) to construct a Business Confidence Index and a Consumer Confidence Index using data from ITPO's exhibitions.

Karnataka Exhibition Authority (KEA) is in early discussions with ITPO to set up Pragati Haat in every district headquarters and one near Bangalore similar to that of Delhi's Pragati Maidan. KEA has sought 20 acres of land in each district and 70 acres of land near Bangalore for the purpose.

As per Allocation of Business Rules (which describes distribution of subject amongst GoI's departments and ministries), ITPO's activities are now classified under Export Promotion, in place of the previous classification under State Trading.

Commerce & Industry Minister Nirmala Sitharaman endorsed in September 2015 that ITPO is one of India's best agencies for international affairs and is on the verge of starting a major Convention Centre in Delhi as the capital does not have a venue where international conferences could be held.

== Financials ==
ITPO was upgraded to Mini-Ratna Category-1 by Department of Public Enterprises (DPE) in 2015 due to continuous profit and robust past performance, empowering ITPO to incur capital expenditure on new projects, modernisation, purchase of equipment etc., without Government approval up to ₹500 crores. ITPO is registered under Section-8 of the Companies Act, 2013 and so does not declare any dividend.

ITPO's cash surplus stands at more than ₹316 crores in FY2021-22. ITPO continues performing handsomely and its networth has surpassed ₹2000 crores in FY2020-21.

== Logo ==
ITPO logo was designed for the erstwhile TFAI by eminent graphic designer Benoy Sarkar in 1974. He is also credited for designing iconic logos of Indian Airlines, Airports Authority of India, Delhi Transport Corporation, etc.

ITPO logo has an interesting depiction of letters T (Trade) and F (Fair). The tone is a fusion of preservation of traditions of Trade and Investments along with modern identity of ITPO. The logo has a universal form. It signifies an authority of India exercising trade through fairs and exhibitions in India and abroad. The emblem has been derived from an inscription on a gold coin belonging to the era of the ancient ruler, Samundragupta (circa 330-380 A.D.) symbolising the zenith achieved in external trade. The vertical and horizontal strokes in the symbol represent life and prosperity.

== Pictures of Halls & Events of ITPO ==
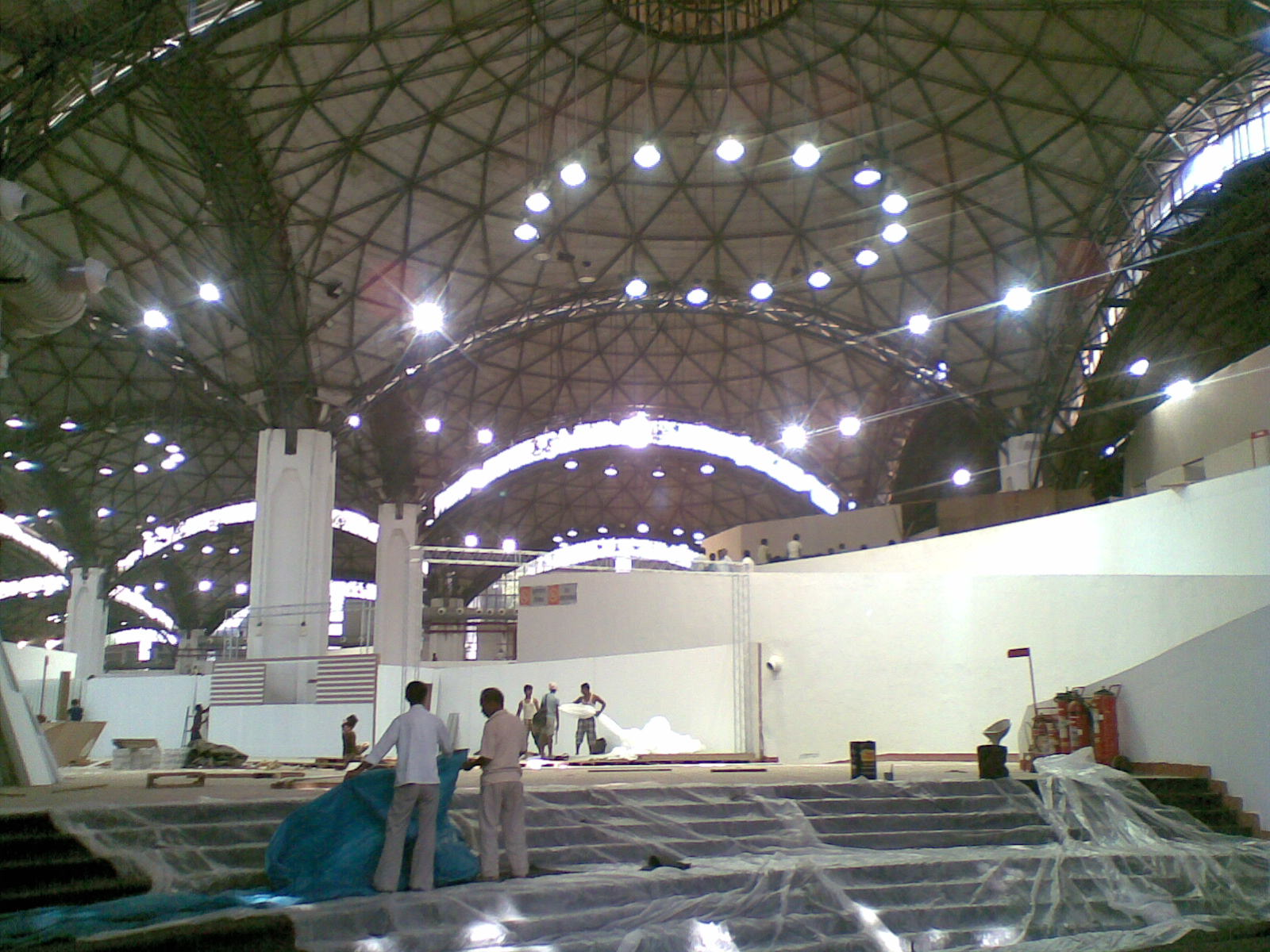
View from entry of Hall-18, Pragati Maidan

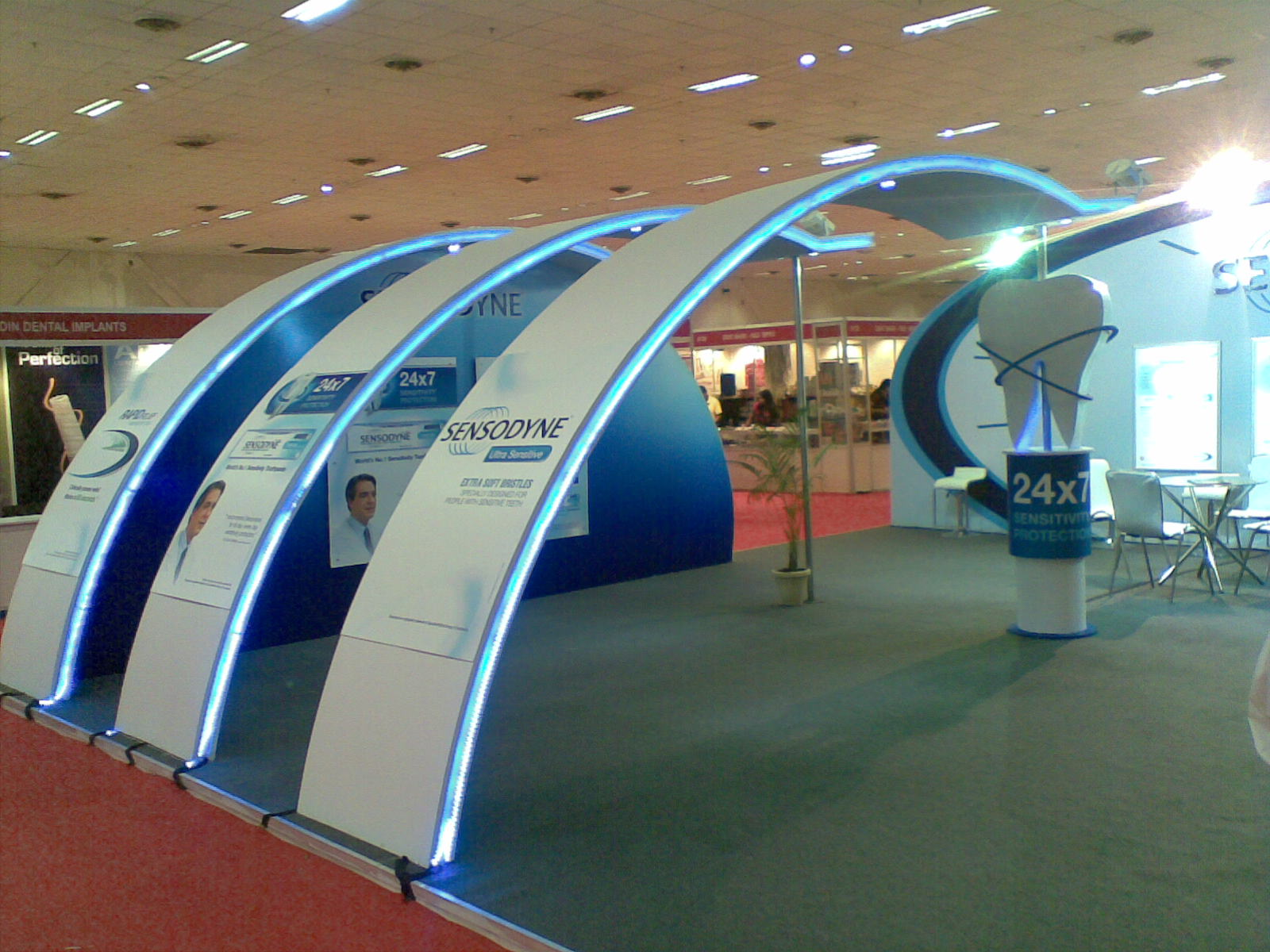
A stall at Pragati Maidan

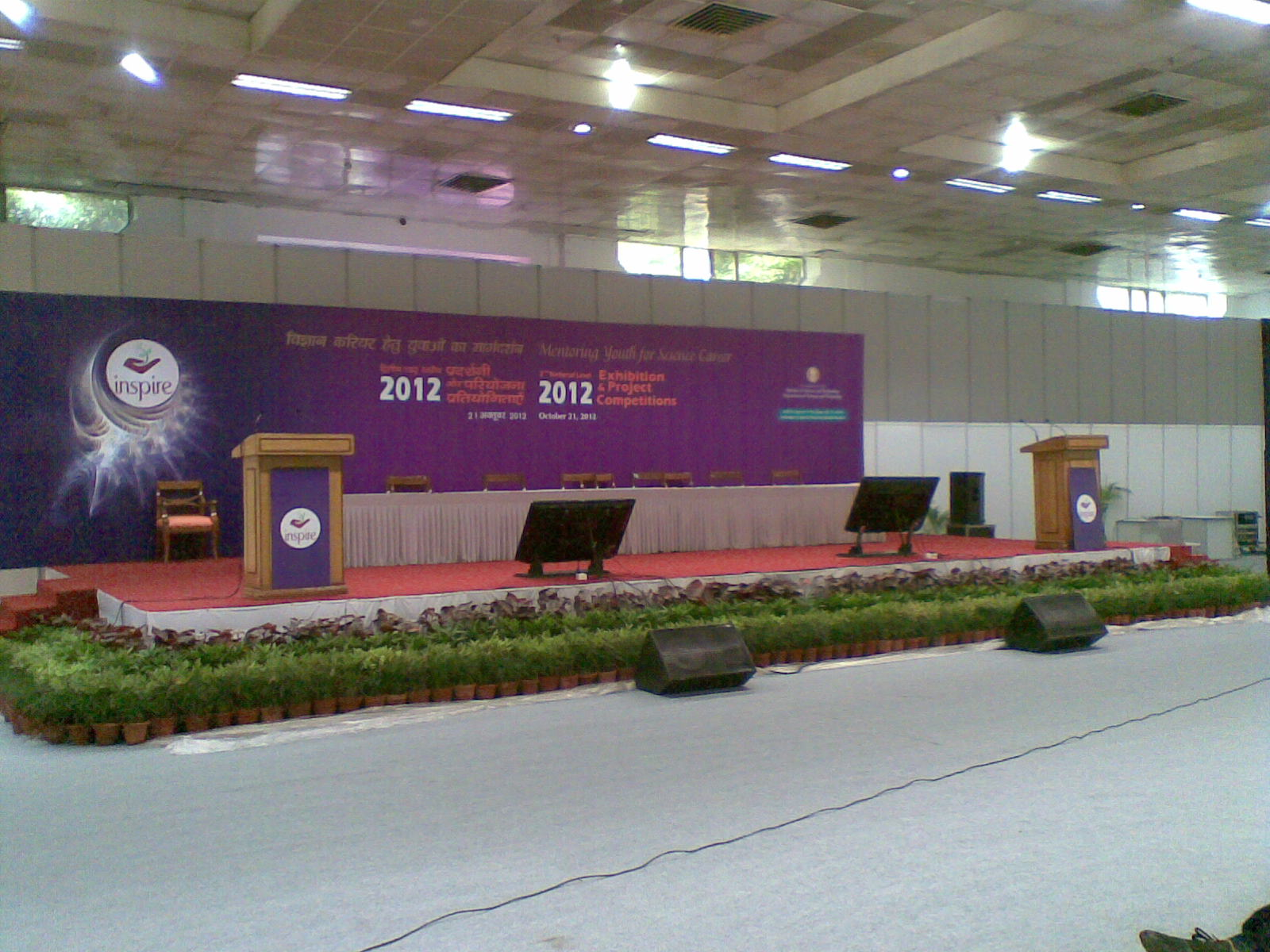
Stage for INSPIRE 2012, held at Pragati Maidan

== See also ==
- List of public sector undertakings in India
