= Asian Games Village (Delhi) =

Located in the Siri Fort area

The Asian Games Village is located in the Siri Fort area, near Hauz Khas in South Delhi, India.

The site was developed as the athletes' village for the 1982 Asian Games held in New Delhi. This site was designed by Raj Rewal The village is the first of its kind in the Games series. Built on the remains of the 15th Century Khalji Dynasty's Siri Fort over an area of 800 acres (3.2 km^{2}), this residential colony has 853 flats of which 793 house top officials of PSUs, bureaucrats, public servants, and union ministers. Former President of India APJ Abdul Kalam was a resident in the colony before his nomination to that position.

Asian Games Village is one of the most desirable and posh areas of New Delhi, as it is surrounded by the lush green spaces of Siri Fort Ridge and located next to the Siri Fort sports complex, which hosted the squash and badminton tournaments during the 2010 Commonwealth Games. A simple 2 BHK flat here is priced at USD 1 million, with full-fledged bungalows starting at USD 4 million. The hierarchy of Courtyards is present at different levels of the complex. The complex consists of 700 housing units, out of which 200 were individual houses and 500 apartments, which vary from 2 to 4-story structures.

Design features used in the Asian Games village.

- Clustering of buildings
- Courtyard providing public space within the building.
- Scattering of terraces creating an interactive space.
- Streets are narrow, shaded, broken up into small units, creating pauses, points of rest, and changing points.
- Green areas and Courtyards are spread all over the site, which can be accessed from almost all sides of the site.
- Terraces that are formed provide semi-private space, which obviously reminds the characteristics of houses of Jaisalmer.
- Vehicular and pedestrian movement is segregated but closely interlinked for convenience
- Peripheral roads are connected to cul-de-sac parking areas, which give access to individual garages or car porches attached to houses or apartments.
- The parking space is on the ground only and has no basement or stilt for the same.

Asiad Village is directly accessible from within to Sirifort Sports Complex with an exclusive entrance. Asian Games Village consists of various blocks and lanes named after eminent sportspersons from India.
