= Raj Rewal =

Indian architect (born 1934)

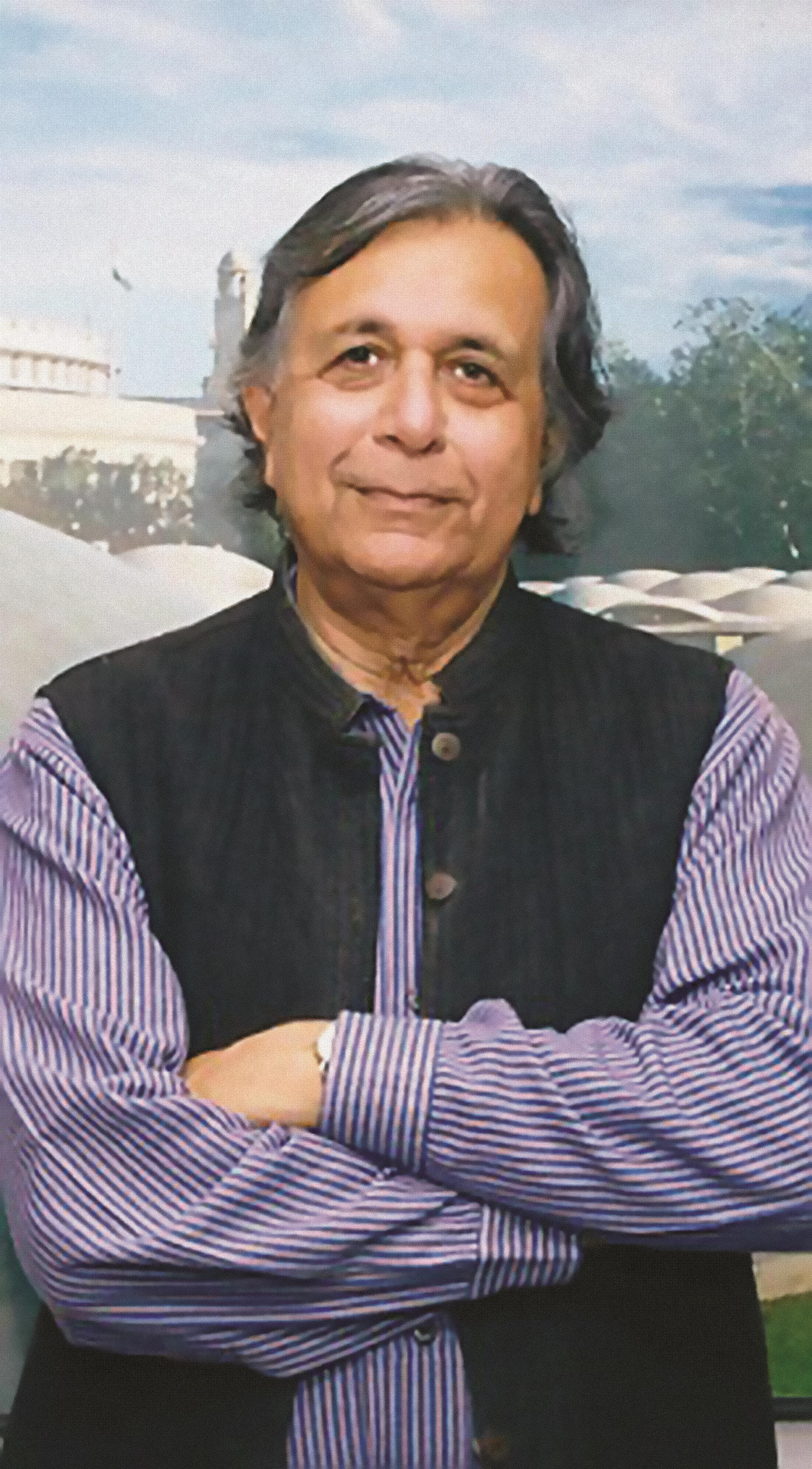
- Born: 24 November 1934 (age 91); Hoshiarpur, Punjab, India
- Occupation: Architect
- Buildings: Hall of Nations, Asiad Village, Parliament Library, State Trading Corporation Building, New Delhi

Raj Rewal (born 24 November 1934) is an Indian architect.

== Education ==
Rewal lived in Delhi and Shimla from 1934 to 1951. He attended Harcourt Butler higher secondary school. From 1951 and 1954, he attended the Delhi School of Architecture in New Delhi. After completing a degree in architecture in New Delhi, he moved to London in 1955 where he lived until 1961. He attended the Architectural Association School of Architecture for one year and the Brixton School of Building, London from 1956 to 1960. GD Goenka University also honour architect Raj Rewal with an honorary doctorate at a special convocation organised by University in India Habitat Centre.

== Career ==
Raj Rewal worked at Michel Ecochard's office in Paris before starting his practice in New Delhi in 1962. Between 1963 and 1972, he taught at the School of Planning and Architecture, Delhi. He opened a second office at Tehran, Iran in 1974. Among his better known projects are the Hall of Nations (Hall 6) at the Pragati Maidan Exhibition Centre, demolished in April 2017, Asiad Village Complex, National Institute of Immunology (NII), New Delhi; the Parliament Library in New Delhi and NCBS (National Centre for Biological Sciences) campus at Bangalore. In 1986, he became the curator of the exhibition "Traditional Architecture in India" for the Government of India organised festival of India in Paris. He also designed an architectural college (SIUPA) in Rohtak and is head of members in academic council. In 2018 his drawings and models were added to the New York Museum of Modern Art permanent collection, making him the first Indian architect represented.

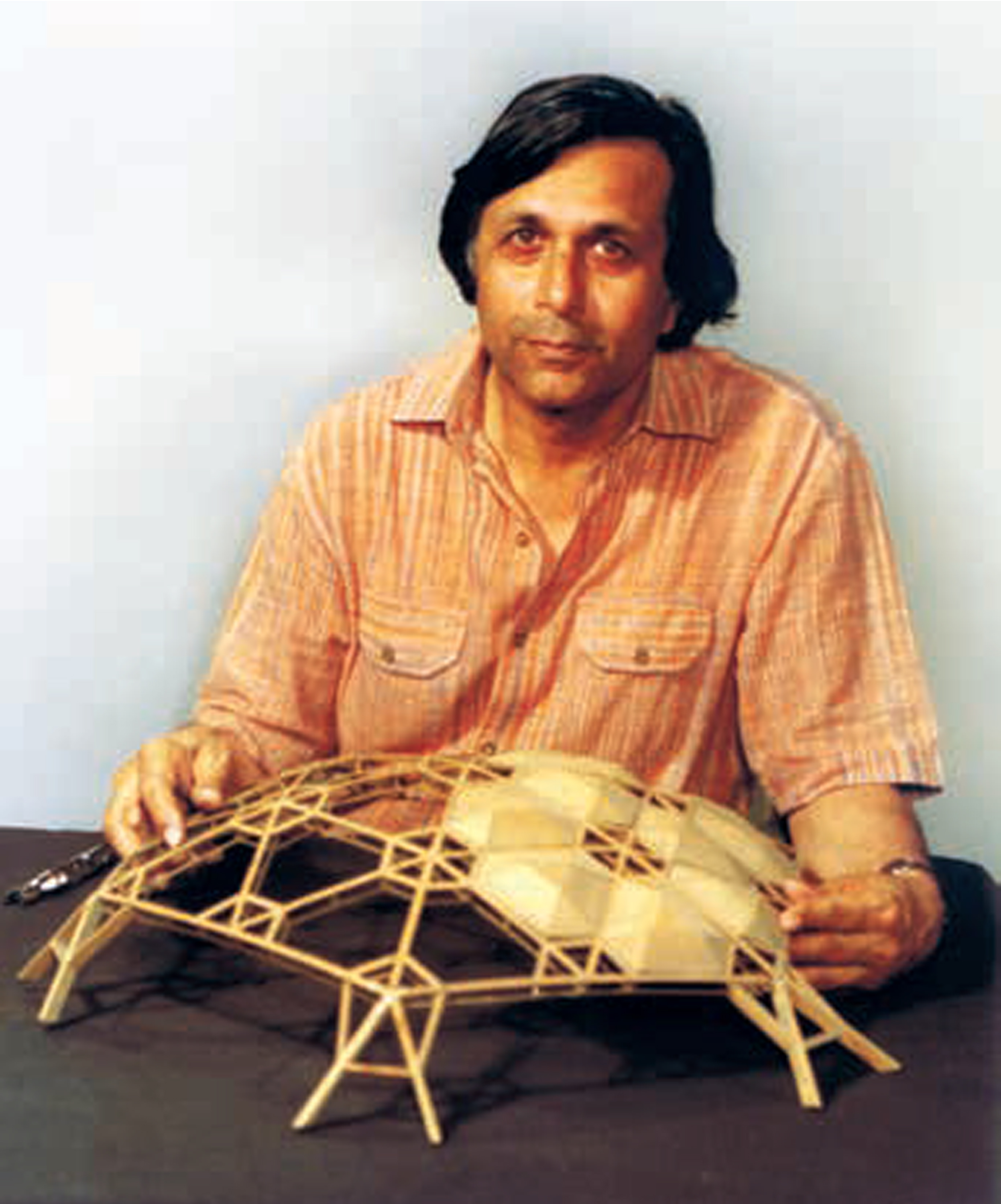

=== Awards ===
- Gold Medal 1989 by the Indian Institute of Architects.
- Robert Mathew Award 1989 by the Commonwealth Association of Architects.
- Mexican Association of Architects award in 1993 for regional values.
- Architect of the Year 1994 Award by J.K. Trust for the design of World Bank Resident Mission building in New Delhi.
- Great Master's Award 1995 by J.K. Trust for lifetime contribution to Modern Architecture in the post independence era in India.
- Lifetime achievement award 2001 by the Institution of Engineers (India).
- IBC award 2002 by the Indian Building Congress for Excellence in Built Environment for Parliament Library building, New Delhi.
- Golden Architect Award 2003 by A+D and Spectrum Foundation
- Chevalier de l'Ordre des Arts et des Lettres, 2005 by the French Government
- Commandeur de l'Ordre des Arts et des Lettres, 2024 by the French Government
- Knight of the Legion of Honour
- John Michael Kohler Life Time Achievement Award

=== Projects ===
- Asian Games Village, New Delhi
- Bio Port, Sohna
- Central Institute of Education Technology, New Delhi
- Cidco Housing, Navi Mumbai
- Coal India Complex, Kolkata
- Delhi Metro Rail Corporation Headquarters, New Delhi
- Energy Technologies Center, NTPC Limited, Greater NOIDA
- Engineers India House, New Delhi
- Gas Training Institute, NOIDA
- French Embassy Staff Quarters, New Delhi
- Satish Gujral House, New Delhi
- GrapeCity - Japanese Software Center, NOIDA

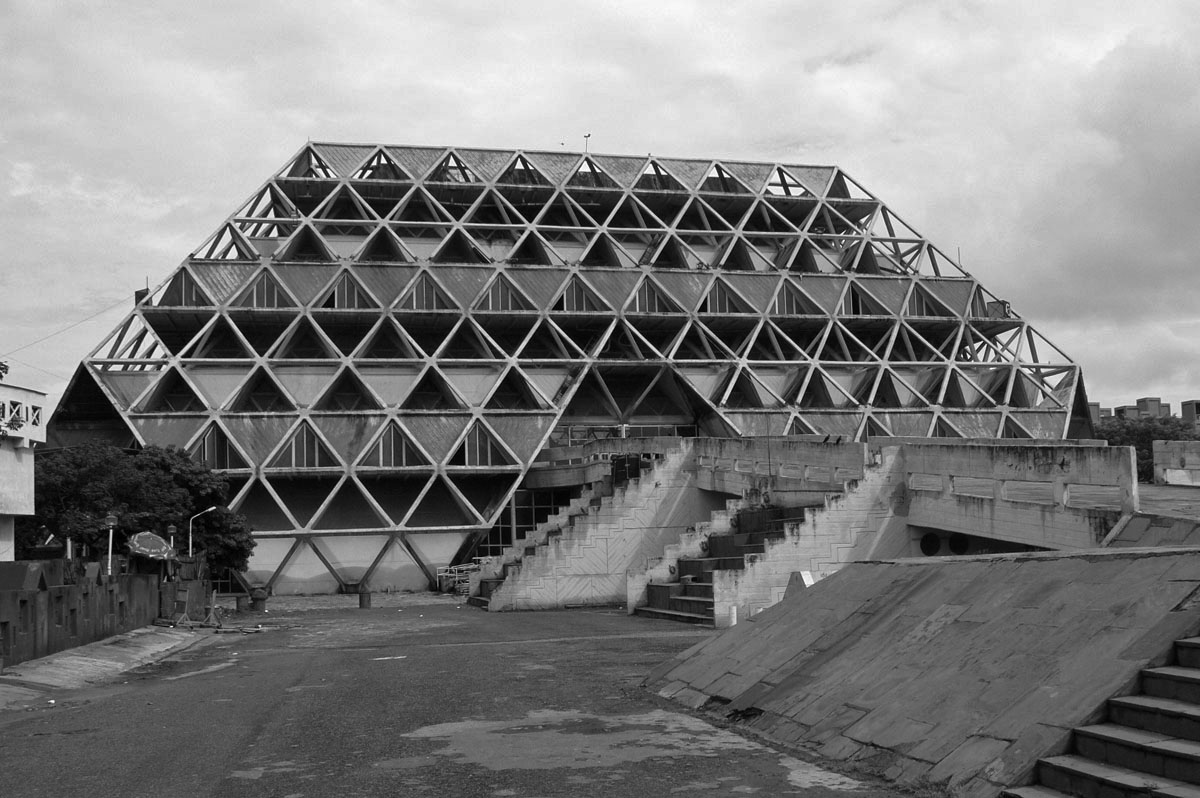
Hall of Nations, Pragati Maidan

- Hall of Nations, Pragati Maidan, New Delhi
- Indian Embassy, Beijing (China)
- Housing for British High Commission, New Delhi
- Indian National Science Academy, New Delhi
- International Centre for Genetic Engineering and Biotechnology, New Delhi
- Jang-e-Azadi Memorial and Museum, Kartarpur, Punjab
- National Brain Research Institute, New Delhi
- National Centre for Biological Sciences, New Delhi
- Lisbon Ismaili Centre, Lisbon (Portugal)
- National Institute for Immunology, New Delhi
- National Institute of Public Finances and Policy, New Delhi
- NTPC Tower, NOIDA

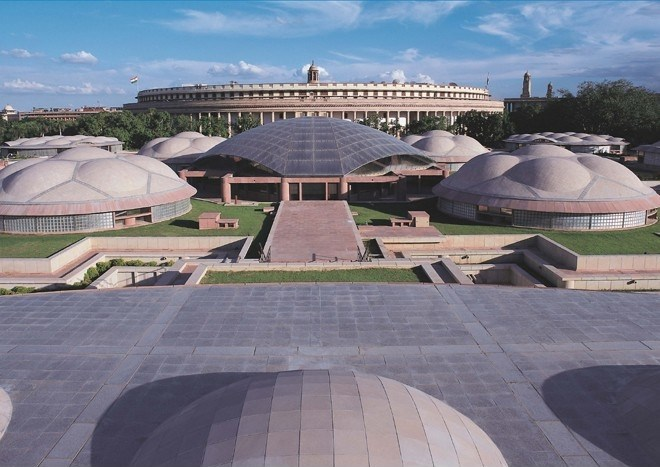
Parliament Library

- Parliament Library at Sansad Bhawan, New Delhi
- Rewal House, New Delhi
- Sahu Jain Pavilion, Pragati Maidan, New Delhi
- Sheikh Sarai Housing, New Delhi
- Sham Lal House, New Delhi
- Standing Conference of Public Enterprises Office Complex, New Delhi
- State Trading Corporation building, New Delhi
- Television Centre (Doordarshan Bhawan), New Delhi
- Visual Arts Institutional Campus, Rohtak
- World Bank Regional Mission, New Delhi

== Books ==
- Raj Rewal by Brain Brace Taylor
- Raj Rewal Selected Architecture Work
- Library for the Indian Parliament
- Raj Rewal: Innovative Architecture and Tradition
- Talking Architecture: Raj Rewal in Conversation with Ramin Jahanbegloo
- Raj Rewal : Architecture climatiqu

== See also ==
- Muzharul Islam
- B. V. Doshi
- Charles Correa
- Bashirul Haq
