= Bharat Mandapam =

Venue in New Delhi, India

- Bhārat Maṇḍapam
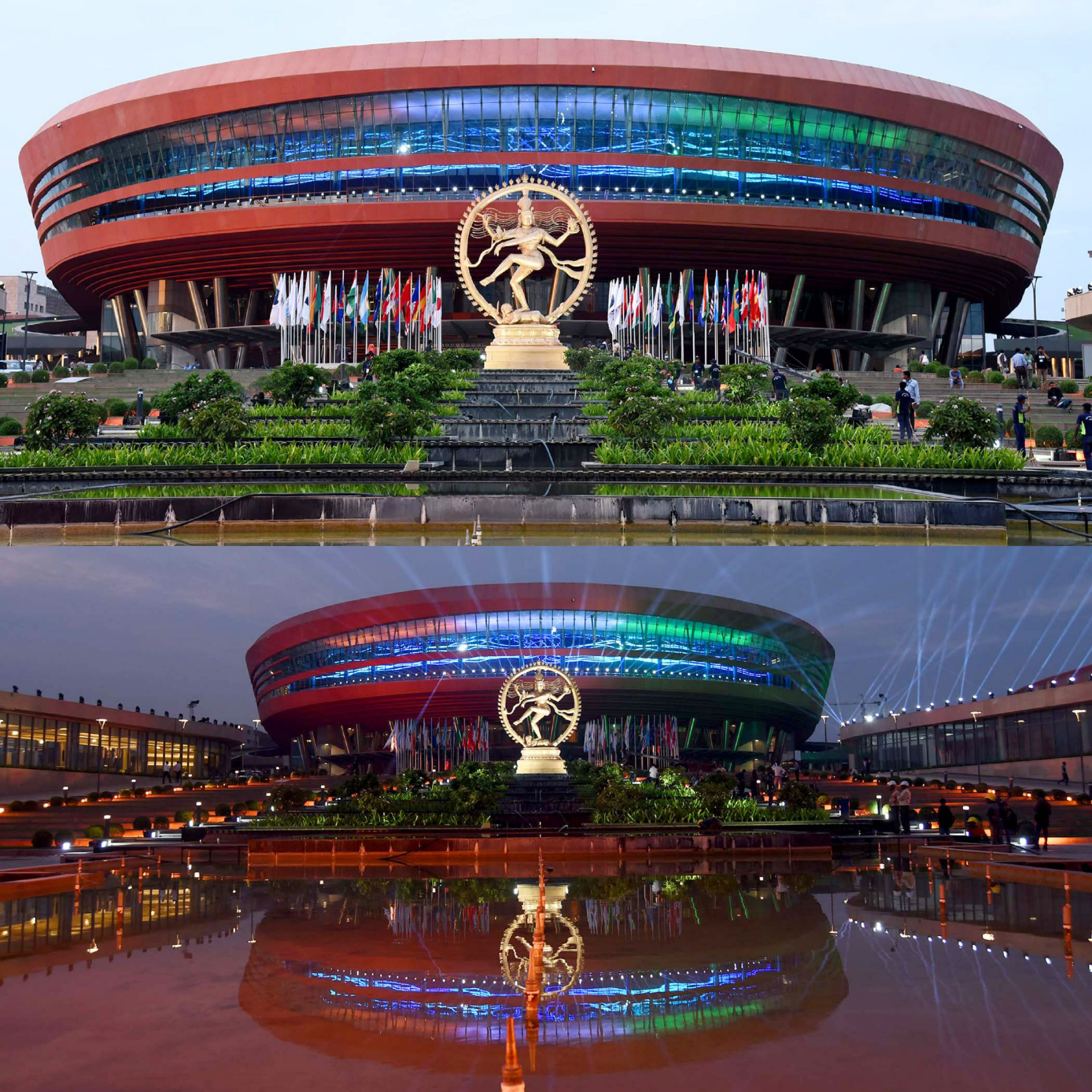

General information
- Architectural style: Retrofuturism
- Location: New Delhi, Delhi, India, India
- Coordinates: 28°37′10″N 77°14′33″E
- Construction started: November 2017
- Inaugurated: 26 July 2023; 3 years ago
- Cost: ₹2,700 crores (equivalent to approximately US$320 million)
- Client: India Trade Promotion Organisation
- Owner: Government of India

Height
- Height: 36.4 metres

Design and construction
- Architecture firm: Arcop Associates; Aedas (Singapore)
- Main contractor: NBCC; Shapoorji Pallonji & Co. Ltd.

Other information
- Public transit: Blue Line Supreme Court

Website
- www.indiatradefair.com

Bharat Mandapam (English: /ˈbʱaːrət̪ ˈməɳɖəpəm/) is an exhibition hall located within the confines of the Pragati Maidan complex in New Delhi, India. It is one of the largest convention centres of India. While the Pragati Maidan complex was inaugurated in 1972, Bharat Mandapam was unveiled in 2023 ahead of the 2023 G20 New Delhi summit.

It was constructed on the site of the Hall of Nations, which was controversially razed in 2017 despite court proceedings underway to address the structure’s heritage status. The decision to demolish the Hall while the matter was sub judice sparked significant public outcry.

With a total built-up area of 390,000 sq. metres, the complex includes a meeting hall that can accommodate 7,000 people in a single format, along with six modern exhibition halls spanning an exhibition area of 150,000 sq. metres. The 2023 G20 New Delhi summit occurred at this venue between 9-10 September, 2023.

== History ==
=== Hall of Nations ===
Bharat Mandapam stands on the site of the former Hall of Nations, a distinct architectural addition to the Pragati Maidan project. Designed by architect Raj Rewal, the Hall was celebrated as the world’s first and then-largest space-frame structure built in reinforced concrete. Pragati Maidan was inaugurated on November 3, 1972, by then-Prime Minister Indira Gandhi on the eve of the International Trade Fair called Asia 72. The venue and the event were meant to commemorate and celebrate 25 years of India's independence.

=== Pragati Maidan ===
Pragati Maidan comprised a vast complex of buildings, covering over 150 acres (0.61 km²) and interspersed with numerous lawns. It overlooked the historic Purana Qila, which was built by the second Mughal emperor Humayun in 1538. The fort is located opposite gate number 1. The complex housed numerous pavilions, including the Nehru Pavilion, the Defence Pavilion, the Indira Pavilion, and the Son of India Pavilion. It featured a variety of structures in eclectic shapes and sizes and includes an auditorium that frequently hosts music shows and plays. Additionally, an internal shuttle service operated within the expansive grounds.

Pragati Maidan used to house a cinema called Shakuntalam, which attained popularity among college students for its comparatively cheap tickets. The complex housed 18 exhibition halls, several buildings, eateries, performance spaces and compounds, including headquarters of the India Trade Promotion Organisation (ITPO), and hosts over 70 national and international exhibitions annually, with the largest being the India International Trade Fair that attracts over 10,000 exhibitors and over 3,000,000 visitors.

Pragati Maidan is flanked by Mathura Road to its west and Bhairon Road on the south. To its east runs the main railway line to Central and Southern India. Situated in Central Delhi, Pragati Maidan offered about 61,290 sq. metres of covered exhibition space in 16 halls, besides 10,000 sq. metres of open display area. In 2006, ahead of the 2010 Commonwealth Games, a ₹1,260-crore redevelopment plan was initiated by the Government of India.

=== Bharat Mandapam project and controversy ===
After the Modi government came to power in 2014, it sought to revamp the Pragati Maidan. The comprehensive revamp plan of the Pragati Maidan IECC project was conceptualised by the ITPO in December 2015. In 2016, a consortium of architecture firms, Arcop (Delhi) and Aedas (Singapore), led by architects Sanjay Singh and Spaniard Simón Núñez de Arenas Fraile respectively, won the competition for the Master Plan and architectural design of the exhibition halls and the convention center. The Integrated Exhibition-cum-Convention Centre (IECC) at Pragati Maidan, developed at a cost exceeding ₹2,600 crore, was constructed by the National Buildings Construction Corporation (NBCC). NBCC subcontracted the work to the Shapoorji Pallonji Group.

The Cabinet Committee on Economic Affairs approved it in January 2017 for implementation in a mission mode. The government’s plan to demolish the Hall of Nations and replace it a new convention center was justified as a necessity for creating a 'world-class' exhibition-cum-convention facility to host the then-upcoming G20 meetings that India would hold a few years later, indicating the central government's clear intent to proceed with the demolition. Conservationists, architects, and organisations from around the world protested the plan to demolish the iconic Hall of Nations, urging the government to preserve the renowned heritage structure.

Raj Rewal, the veteran architect who designed the Hall of Nations, submitted a plea in the Delhi High Court seeking its preservation. He also stated that the Hall of Nations covered 2% of the 123-acre area of Pragati Maidan, while the three buildings cumulatively accounted for merely 7% of the total site area. It was, however, spurned by Justice Sanjeev Sachdeva. The court's decision relied primarily on the directives constituted by the Heritage Conservation Committee—setup by the Supreme Court of India in 2004—which stated that only structures 60 years or older or those that last at least two generations would be considered for conferral with heritage designation. The verdict also stated that since no challenge was posed to the Heritage Conservation Committee's guidelines—which were, quite peculiarly, formulated in February of the same year—no legal remedy could be sought.

The International Union of Architects (UIA), representing over 3.2 million architects from 120 countries, also called on Prime Minister Modi to ensure the protection of the Hall. In its appeal, the UIA described the Hall as 'one of the largest space frames in concrete and internationally acclaimed as one of the most important buildings of the last century.' However, the appeal went unanswered.

Appeals against the planned demolition courted traction from various quarters, with letters of support poring in from ETH Zurich, New York's Metropolitan Museum of Art, and the Centre Pompidou in Paris. A Change.org petition amassed over 4,413 signatories too.

The Indian National Trust for Art and Cultural Heritage (INTACH), a nonprofit organisation dedicated to heritage conservation in India, lodged a petition in the Delhi High Court seeking an injunction against the planned demolition. However, on April 24, 2017, despite protests, appeals, and public outcry, and amidst an ongoing legal intervention in the Delhi High Court to protect the structure, the ITPO went ahead with demolishing the Hall of Nations, Nehru Pavilion, Hall of Industry, state pavilions, and several exhibition halls during the night; by morning, they were reduced to rubble.

NBCC officials later contended that sparing the Hall of Nations would have established a precedent. They further claimed that the Hall had "outlived its existence in the last 40 years."

Historian and social activist Sohail Hashmi alleged that the main target of the demolition spearheaded by the Government of India was Nehru Pavilion, which was constructed to depict, exhibit, and chronicle the legacy of India's first Prime Minister, Jawaharlal Nehru. He further stated that the incumbent government, led by a right-wing Hindu nationalist party, wishes to rewrite history.

Indian Prime Minister Narendra Modi, Russian President Vladimir Putin and Chinese President Xi Jinping during a joint tree-planting ceremony on the sidelines of the 18th BRICS Summit at Bharat Mandapam, 12 September 2026

The complex was replaced by a new Bharat Mandapam, which was inaugurated by Prime Minister Modi in July 2023. Modi's remarks during the inauguration of Bharat Mandapam revealed his indifference to the preservation efforts. In his speech, he dismissed the critics of the new complex, claiming that opposition to the project was temporary and that, like past developments, the same voices would eventually learn to accept it. He confidently stated that the critics of the project, whom he referred to as the 'Toli' (Hindi for gang), might even end up delivering lectures at Bharat Mandapam in the future, further illustrating his disregard for the appeals to protect the heritage structure.

The project spans a total built-up area of 390,000 m² and includes an iconic, world-class convention centre with a capacity for 7,000 people in a single format, six modern exhibition halls covering 150,000 m² of exhibition space, ample underground parking, and strong infrastructure connectivity. This design encourages public transportation use while also enabling quick road decongestion. Pragati Maidan is spread over 123 acres of prime land in the heart of India's capital, New Delhi. The revamped complex also includes newly built double-storied exhibition halls—Halls 1, 2, 3, 4, 5, and 14—along with a single-floor structure, Hall 6.

In September 2023, it hosted the G20 Leader's Summit.

== Pragati Maidan ==
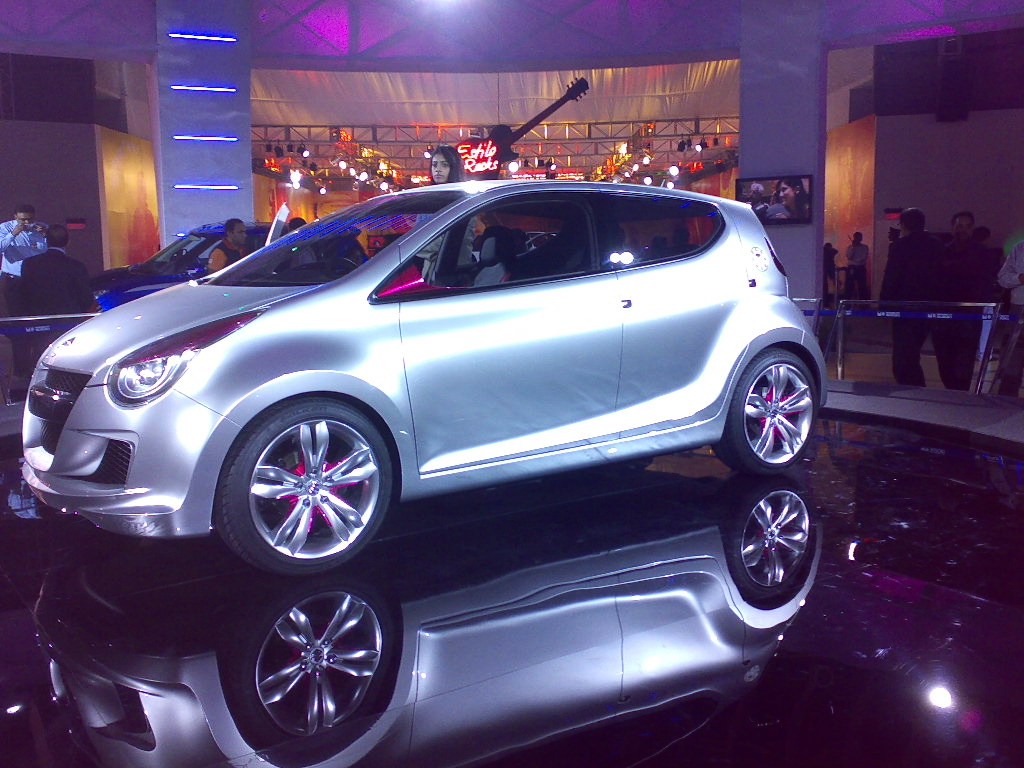
The Auto Expo, Asia's largest auto show, was held biennially at Pragati Maidan

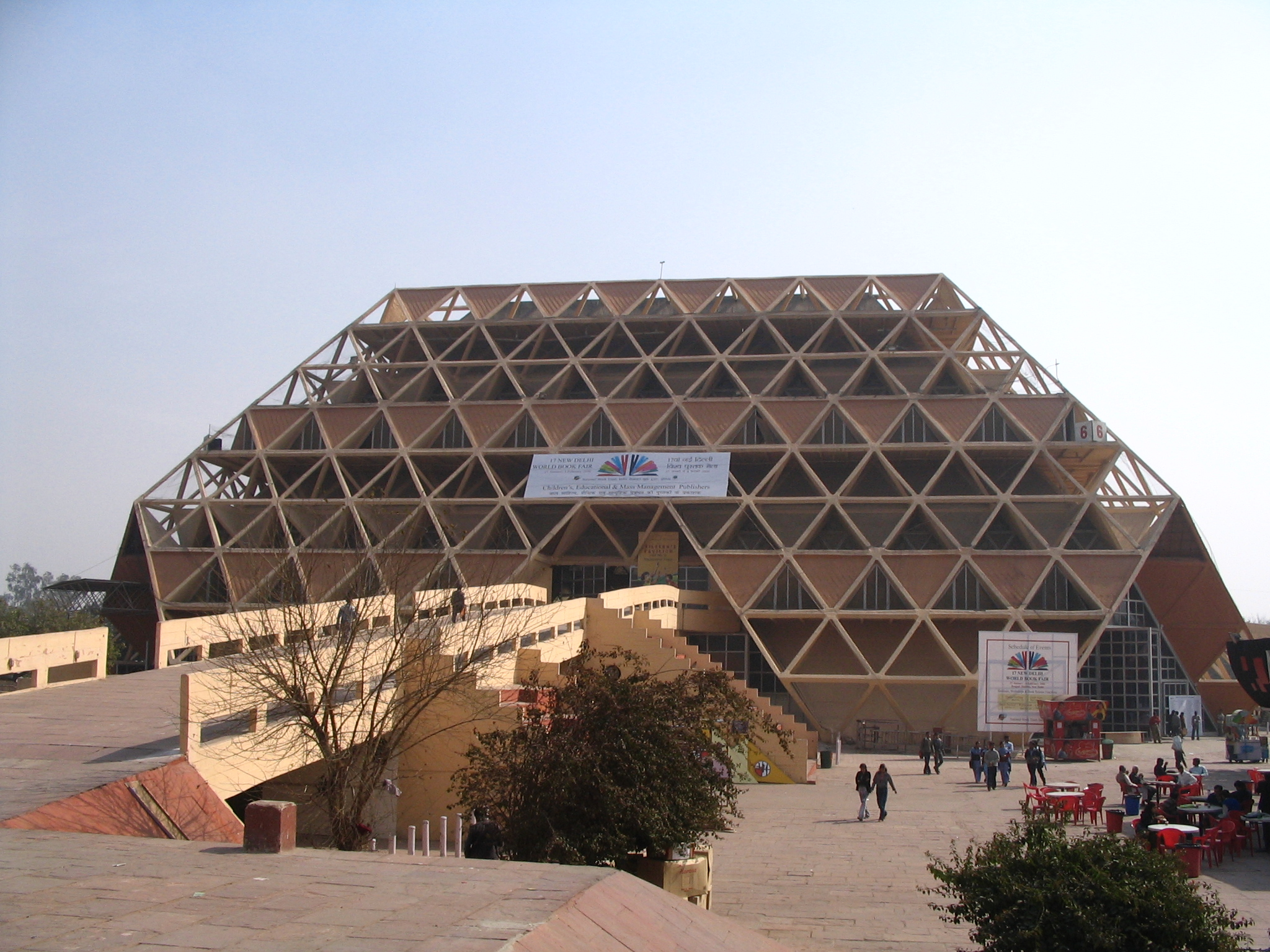
Pragati Maidan, Hall 6

The Pragati Maidan complex is divided into two sections: the old hall complex, which encompasses Halls 7 to 12A, and the new hall complex, which comprises Halls 1 to 6 and Hall 14. Some of the major events held at Pragati Maidan include the India International Trade Fair, a key event for showcasing global business and industry; Auto Expo, India's premier automobile exhibition; the World Book Fair, one of the most prominent cultural events for book enthusiasts in the world; and AAHAR, an international exhibition focused on the food and hospitality industry.

The India International Trade Fair (IITF), a two-week-long event, commences annually on 14 November at this venue. In 1999, during the fair, two new air-conditioned halls, 12 and 13, covering an area of 9,000 m², were opened to the public. That year, around 5,200 enterprises and over 70 companies from 14 countries participated in the event. The 2003 edition of the IITF saw over 2.5 million visitors to Pragati Maidan. The Northern Railways ran special trains to Pragati Maidan during the 2008 edition of the fair. The Delhi Metro, in a similar vein, handled an average daily ridership of 50,000 commuters during the same period.

Straddling a corner of Pragati Maidan overlooking the Mathura Road is the Matka Peer, the dargah shrine of Hazrat Sheikh Abubakr Tusi Qalandari, a mystic who arrived in Delhi from Iran around 1260 CE. Further down Bhairon Road lies the National Handicrafts and Handlooms Museum, and even further along stands the National Science Centre. The Pragati Maidan metro station, spanning 6,800 square meters and comprising the Blue Line of the Delhi Metro, opened in November 2006 during the India International Trade Fair. On its eighth day, the station accommodated over 200,000 passengers. In December 2019, the Delhi Government's naming committee decided to rechristen the station to Supreme Court owing to its proximity to the Supreme Court of India.

Each year, the Income Tax Department opens over 150 counters for filing income tax returns. It also hosted the Wills Lifestyle Indian Fashion Week, organised by the Fashion Design Council of India, in 2008 and 2009. Additionally, it features exhibitions spanning virtually all major industries, including toys, leather goods, lifestyle products and services, export items, medical equipment, sports equipment, and even a job fair.

== Accessibility ==
Pragati Maidan is accessible via the Supreme Court station of Delhi Metro. It is located adjacent to Gate 10 of the complex. Hazrat Nizamuddin railway station of the Indian Railways network is about three kilometres away.

When exhibitions and events are underway, visitors can also enter through Gate number 4, located on Bhairon Marg.

== Gallery ==
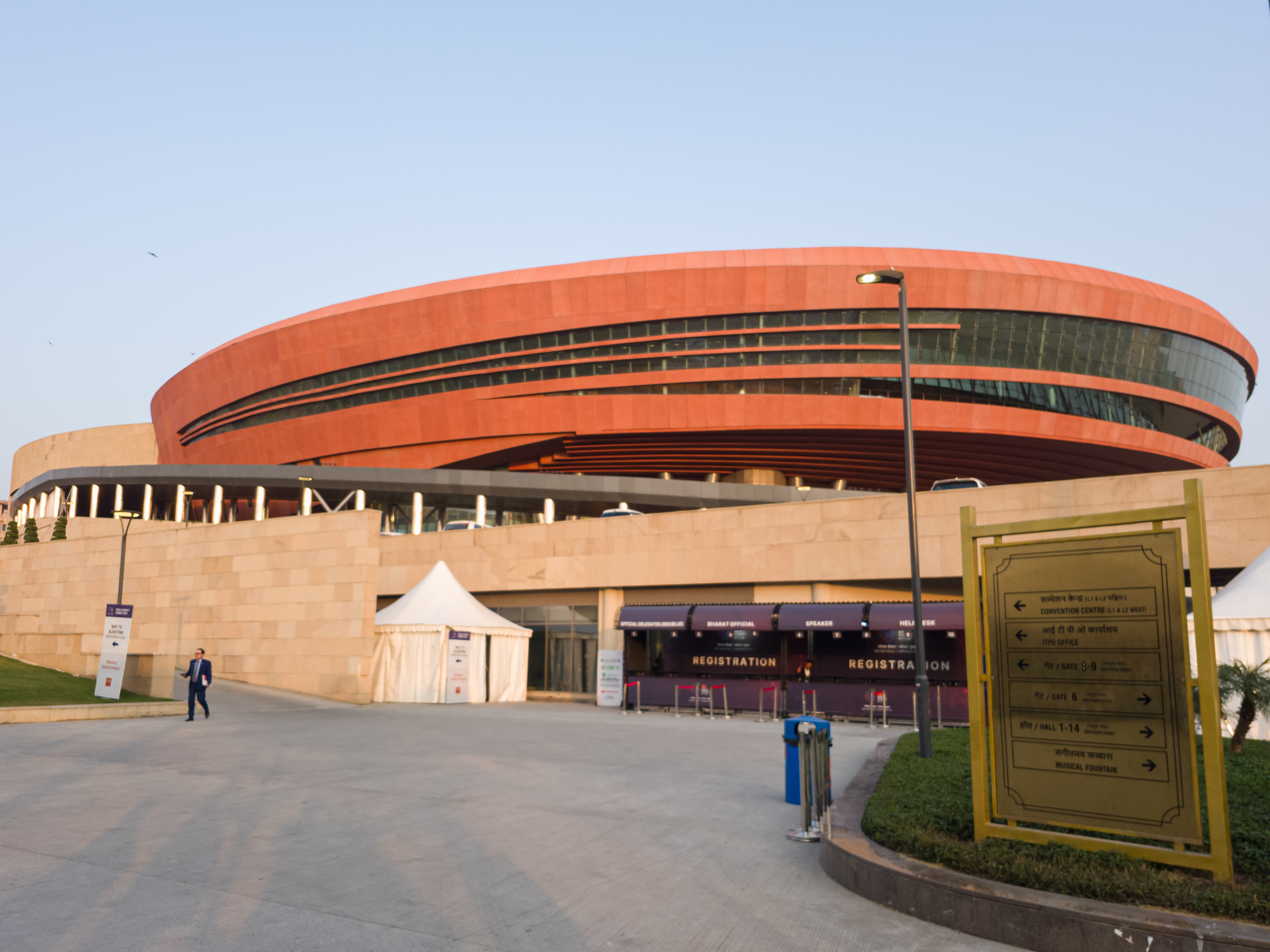
View from Gate No. 7

== See also ==
- Hall of Nations - Demolished in 2017
- Neighbourhoods of Delhi
- Auto Expo
- Pragati Maidan railway station
- Yashobhoomi
