= Mandholi Khurd =

- Village
- Location in Haryana, India Mandholi Khurd (India)
- Coordinates: 28.7091°N 75.6467°E
- Country: India
- State: Haryana
- District: Bhiwani
- Tehsil: Siwani
- Elevation: 210 m (690 ft)

Languages
  - Official: Hindi haryanvi
- Time zone: UTC+5:30 (IST)
- PIN: 127046
- ISO 3166 code: IN-HR
- Vehicle registration: HR
- Website: haryana.gov.in

Mandholi Khurd is a village and administrative unit in Loharu (Vidhan Sabha constituency), Siwani Tehsil of Bhiwani District under Bhiwani-Mahendragarh Lok Sabha constituency and Hisar Division of the Indian state of Haryana. It has a democratically elected panchayat samiti (local council).

It is situated 53 kilometres (33 mi) from Hisar on the Hisar-Rajgarh road and 55 kilometres (34 mi) from district headquarters Bhiwani.

== History ==
=== Bidhwan Jaglan Zail and Jaglan Lambardari ===
Bidhwan is the seat of the former Jaglan Zail that was headed by the Zaildar from an influential Jaglan clan, who ruled over four revenue villages of Princely state called Loharu State during British Raj period. Descendants of whom still live in the village and their descendant Surender Singh Jaglan serves as Lambardar of these villages. The four villages of Bidhwan (बिधवाण), Kalali (कलाली), Mandholi Khurd (मंढोली खुर्द) and Mandholi Kalan (मंढोलीकलां) lie in Bhiwani district.

=== Archaeological sites ===
Nearby Indus Valley civilization archaeological sites include Banawali, Lohari Ragho, Masudpur, Rakhigarhi, Siswal all with Hissar district as well as Burj and Bhirrana and Kunal and Balu in Fatehabad and Mitathal and Naurangabad in Bhiwani district. Another archaeological site is Agroha Mound.

== Administration ==
It is under Bhiwani Zilla Panchayat and has its own unreserved Gram Panchayat under Gram Panchayat Smiti. A Patwari (government land record officer), an ADO (Agriculture Development Officer), a Rural Health Officer (RHO), and an Anganwadi worker are present.

== Jat gotras ==
The following Jat gotras are found in the village:

- Saangwan Fouji
- Bangarwa
- Dhindhwal
- Siwach
- Lakhlan
- Bharia
- Jakhar
- Sheoran
- Nehra
- Jaglan
- Nagal
- Dangi
- Phogat
- Gadhotia
- Rao
- Poonia Kothari kulariya

== Transport ==
=== Road ===
It is connected by a paved road.

=== Rail ===
The nearest train stations are 9 km Jhumpa Khurd, 10 km Bahal, 21 km Siwani, 29 Rajgarh. The nearest major junctions are 55 km (34 mi) away at Hisar city and 52 km at Bhiwani city.

=== Air ===
Hisar Airport is the nearest functional airport, 55 km (34 mi) away. No commercial flights serve this airport. The nearest domestic and international airport is 165 km (103 mi) at Delhi.

== See also ==
- Bidhwan
- Badya Jattan
- Barwas
- Mandholi Kalan
- Kanwari
- Zaildar
- List of Zaildars by Zail
