= Mandholi Kalan =

- Village
- Location in Haryana, India Mandholi Kalan (India)
- Coordinates: 28.7083°N 75.6826°E
- Country: India
- State: Haryana
- District: Bhiwani
- Tehsil: Loharu
- Elevation: 210 m (690 ft)

Languages
  - Official: Hindi
- Time zone: UTC+5:30 (IST)
- PIN: 127043
- ISO 3166 code: IN-HR
- Vehicle registration: HR
- Website: haryana.gov.in

Mandholi Kalan, next to Mandholi Khurd, Rambass (part of Mandholi Kalan) situated 5 km from Mandholi Gopalwas, Kasni Kalan and Isharwal, is a village and administrative unit with a democratically elected panchayat samiti (local council) in the Loharu (Vidhan Sabha constituency), Loharu Tehsil of Bhiwani District under Bhiwani-Mahendragarh Lok Sabha constituency and Hisar Division of Haryana state.

It is situated 53 kilometres (33 mi) from Hisar on the Hisar-Rajgarh road and 55 kilometres (34 mi) from the district headquarters Bhiwani.

== History ==
=== Bidhwan Jaglan Zail and Jaglan Lambardari ===
Bidhwan is seat of the former Jaglan Zail that was headed by the Zaildar from influential Jaglan clan who during the British Raj ruled over four revenue villages of Princely state called Loharu State. Descendants of whom still live in the village and their descendant Surender Singh Jaglan still holds the position of Lambardar of these villages. Currently, these four villages of Bidhwan (बिधवाण), Kalali (कलाली), Mandholi Khurd (मंढोली खुर्द) and Mandholi Kalan (मंढोलीकलां) lie in Bhiwani district.

=== Nearby archaeological sites ===
Nearby Indus Valley civilization archaeological sites are Banawali, Lohari Ragho, Masudpur, Rakhigarhi, Siswal all with Hissar district as well as Burj and Bhirrana and Kunal and Balu in Fatehabad and Mitathal and Naurangabad in Bhiwani district. Another archaeological site is Agroha Mound.

== Administration ==
Currently, it is under Bhiwani Zilla Panchayat and has its own unreserved Gram Panchayat under Gram Panchayat Smiti. There is a Patwari (government land record officer), an ADO (Agriculture Development Officer), a rural health officer, and an Anganbadi worker.

== Transportation ==
It is well connected by the paved bitumen road. It lies from 9 km Jhumpa Khurd, 18 km Bahal, 21 km Siwani, 29 Rajgarh (Rajasthan), 33 Kairu, 55 km Hissar, 57 km Hansi, 49 km Pilani, 50 km from Bhiwani, 163 km Delhi and 282 km from state capital Chandigarh.

=== Train connectivity ===
Nearest train stations are 9 km Jhumpa Khurd, 18 km Bahal, 21 km Siwani, 29 Rajgarh. Nearest major junctions are 55 km (34 mi) at Hisar, India city and 52 km at Bhiwani city.

=== Airport connectivity ===
Hisar Airport, the nearest functional airport and flying training club is 55 km (34 mi) away. Currently no commercial flights from this airport. Nearest domestic and international airport is 165 km (103 mi) at Delhi.

== See also ==
- mandholi kalan(rambass)
- Bidhwan
- Badya Jattan
- Barwas
- Mandholi Khurd
- Kanwari
- Zaildar
- List of Zaildars by Zail
