= Pabra, Hisar =

Pabra
- Village
- Location in Haryana, India Pabra (India)
- Coordinates: 29°24′51″N 75°47′13″E
- Country: India
- State: Haryana
- District: Hisar district
- Tehsil: Uklana

Government
  - Type: Govt sn sec school pabra
  - Body: Primary Hospital
- Elevation: 210 m (690 ft)

Languages
  - Official: Hindi
- Time zone: UTC+5:30 (IST)
- 125112: 125112
- ISO 3166 code: IN-HR
- Vehicle registration: HR 80
- Website: haryana.gov.in

Pabra, is a village and administrative unit with a democratically elected panchayat samiti (local council) in Uklana Tehsil of Hisar district under Hisar Lok Sabha constituency and Hisar Division of Haryana state.

== Administration ==
It has own unreserved Gram Panchayat under Gram Panchayat Smiti. There is a Patwari (government land record officer), an ADO (Agriculture Development Officer), a Rural Health Officer (RHO), and an Anganbadi Worker. Pabra is 35 km from Hisar bus stand.

== Jat gotras ==
The following Jat gotras are found in the village:

- Kundu
- Grewal
- Grover
- Dhillon

== See also ==
- Bidhwan
- Badya Jattan
- Barwas
- Mandholi Kalan
- Kanwari
- Zaildar
- List of Zaildars by Zail
