= Jhumpa Khurd =

Jhumpa Kalan and Jhumpa Khurd
- Village
- Location in Haryana, India Jhumpa Kalan and Jhumpa Khurd (India)
- Coordinates: 28.46°N 75.32°E
- Country: India
- State: Haryana
- District: Bhiwani
- Tehsil: Siwani
- Elevation: 210 m (690 ft)

Population (2011)
  - Total: 2,868

Languages
  - Official: Hindi
- Time zone: UTC+5:30 (IST)
- PIN: 127046
- ISO 3166 code: IN-HR
- Vehicle registration: HR
- Website: haryana.gov.in

Jhumpa, composed of twin villages of Jhumpa Kalan and Jhumpa Khurd, are in the Loharu (Vidhan Sabha constituency), Siwani Tehsil of the Bhiwani District in the Indian state of Haryana. Close to the border with Rajasthan state, the census code is 06-state, 081-district, 00401-tehsil and 53-village. As of the 2011 Census of India, the village had 144 households.

== Location ==
It is situated on India's National Highway No. 65 i.e. NH-65 which is to be upgraded to NH-52 in near future. It has a railway station as well.

== Facilities ==
It has a small hospital i.e. Primary Health Care Center (PHC), Veterinary Hospital, Post Office, a rest house, numerous petrol pumps, small market(which is growing day by day), police station, bus stand where one can catch a bus anytime, medicine stores, Kshetriya Gramin Bank (a subsidiary of Punjab National Bank), Sahkari Smiti Bank (Mini Bank) etc. All the basic facilities are available in the village e.g. water, electricity, medical, transportation, Govt. School up to class 12th (separate school for girls is under construction as of January 2015). Farming is the main source of income though most part of the land is rain-dependent. Rainfall has been very low in the recent years. The village is expected to be a growing hub for agro-business in near future.

== See also ==
- Badya Jattan
- Bidhwan
- Kalali
- Kanwari
- Mandholi Kalan
- Mandholi Khurd
- Zaildar
- List of Zaildars by Zail
