= Kundwana =

Gujjar sub-caste

Kanduana
- کندوآنہ
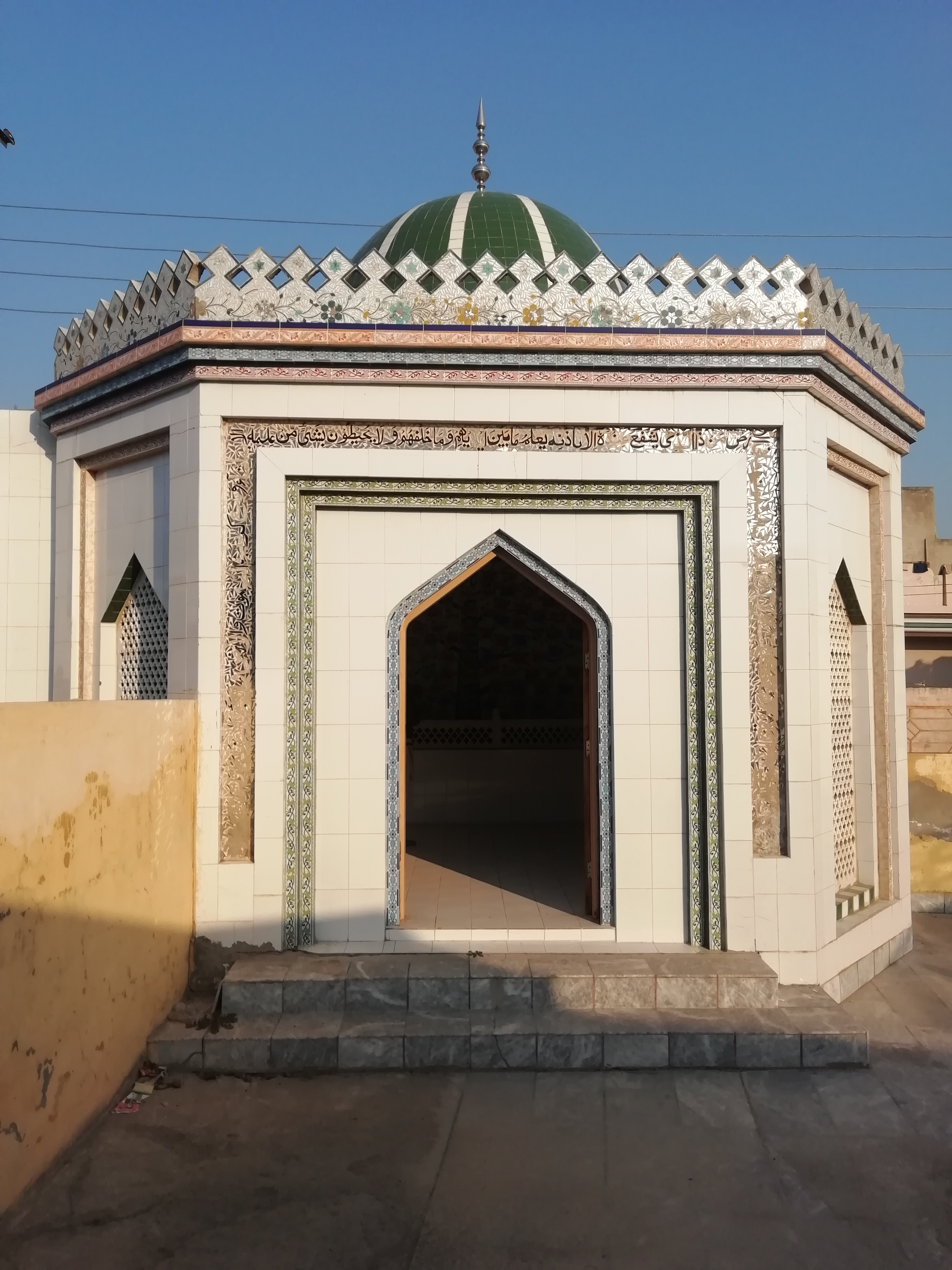
- Tomb of Kandu, ancestor of Kanduana Gujjars at Makiana village, Gujrat District, Punjab, Pakistan. Photo by Muhammad Afsar Khan
- Religions: Islam
- Languages: • Gojari • Punjabi • Urdu • Kashmiri • Hindi
- Country: • Pakistan • India
- Region: • Pakistani Punjab • Indian Punjab • Indian-administered Kashmir
- Lineage: From Kandu, son of Murid who lived in Makiana Village, Gujrat District, Subah of Lahore, Mughal India in c. 16th century CE.
- Related groups: • Handuana • Aakia • Gajgahia

Kanduana, (Urdu: کندوآنہ); Kundwana, Kunduana, or Kundoana is a clan of the Punjabi Gujjars found in Pakistan and India.

== Spelling accuracy ==
Keeping in view the name of Kandu, their ancestor, spelling Kanduana seem to be more correct for the clan but odd to pronounce hence Kundwana, Kunduana or Kundoana.

== Definition ==
The Kunduana are descendants of Kandu, a leading Gujjar belonging to early modern period of Gujrat, Pakistan around the time when Akbar founded the Gujrat City in 1580 CE.

== Lineage ==
The ancestor of Kunduanas was Kandu, a resident of Makiana village in Gujrat district, Punjab, Pakistan. His tomb is also situated in the same village. His grave has withstood the revolution of time despite that the area of Gujrat fell pray to anarchy during the years between Mughal Empire and Sikh Empire. "Situated as it is with the Imperial Road, the whole tract was sacked and ravaged again and again, the towns and villages burnt and pillaged, taken and retaken by the various armies passing and repassing," writes Captain A Elliott, former deputy commissioner of Gujrat.

== Early modern period ==
=== Mughal Empire ===
During the reign of Mughal emperors, when the modern day Gujrat District was part of Subah of Lahore, the Ilaqa of Gujrat had three Parganas. Out of these, the Pargana of Gujrat had eight Tappas. One of these Tappas was named after the ancestor of Kunduanas and called Tappa of Kandu. This Tappa had six Topes and 320 villages out of which 209 were Uslee (original) and 111 Dakhlee (internal). Alamgir II was the last Mughal emperor having sway over Gujrat District. The following were the district administration subdivisions under the Mughal emperors:

- Ilaqa (علاقہ) -- headed by Fauzdar (administrative head), Amalguzar (revenue collector) and Kotwal (responsible for maintenance of law and order, the trial of criminal cases, and price regulation).
- Pargana (پرگنہ) or Taraf (طرف) -- headed by Shiqdar (police chief at the Pargana level who also had to perform duties of Kotwal) and Amin (revenue collector).
- Tappa (تپہ) -- manned by Tapedar (treasurer), Qanungo (keeper of land record) and Bitikchis (clerks). Its head might have the same powers as the modern day Tapedar in Sindh. A Tappa during the Mughal rule corresponded to a Zail under the Sikh Empire and British Raj.
- Tope (توپ) -- headed by a Chaudhry.
- Mauza (موضع) -- manned by Muqaddam (head of the village), Patwari (performing the duties of an accountant) and Chowkidar (watchman).

The Tappa of Kandu (Mughal India) had six Topes, detail of which is as follows:

Tope	Existing name	Villages in the Tope	Existing name
Aminpur Ibrahim alias Soi Paswal	?	(i) Chak Sikandar (ii) Kotla Chaudhari Feroz Khan	(i) ? (ii) ?
Udho Korsi alias Dhauria Sardar Qamar Singhwala	Dhoria	(i) Bhago Wadala (ii) Barnali Bhai Majja Singhwali	(i) Bhago (ii) Barnali
Randhir	Randhir	(i) Chillianwali	(i) Chillianwala
Khwaspur	Khawaspur	(i) Nandowal	(i) Nindowal
Daulatanagar	Daulat Nagar	(i) Alamgirpur Khaman (ii) Fatehpur	(i) ? (ii) Fatehpur
Murida Makyana	Makiana	(i) Devana (ii) Sadhri	(i) Deona (ii) Saidhry

=== Sikh Empire ===
During the Sikh Empire, administrative unit Pargana was replaced with Ilaqa while Tappa was renamed as Zail and number of Ilaqas and Zails was increased as compared to their previous counterparts. The Zails were made when Ranjit Singh assumed direct government, by his astute ministers Fakir Nuruddin and Fakir Azizuddin. The name of Kandu was not carried forward in the newly formed Zails. The only available list of the Zails during the Sikh Empire is the one which stood immediately before the advent of the British Raj. This list does not show any Zail with the name of Kandu. However, many Kunduanas were appointed as Zaildars during the Sikh Empire. The district administration units under the Sikh Empire were as follows:

- Pargana (پرگنہ) -- was under an official known as Kardar.
- Taluka (تعلقہ)
- Ilaqa (علاقہ)
- Zail (ذیل), was headed by a Zaildar.
- Mauza (موضع), was headed by a Chaudhry or Muqaddam.

== Modern period ==
=== East India Company rule ===
After decline of the Sikh Empire, the present-day Gujrat District went under the control of Bengal Presidency with capital at Calcutta.

=== British Raj ===
The British Raj adopted the administrative unit Zail introduced by the Sikh Empire.

=== Pakistan ===
In Pakistan, Kunduana are found in Gujrat, Gujranwala, Lahore, Faisalabad, Chakwal, Sialkot, Sahiwal, Sargodha, Hafizabad, Narowal, Bahawalpur, Multan, Bahawalnagar and Sheikhupura districts of Punjab.

=== India ===
In India, Kunduanas reside mainly in the Punjab and the Indian-administered Kashmir. In Kashmir, they are found in the tehsil of Srinagar.

== Religion ==
The majority of Kunduanas are Muslim. The Muslim population of Kunduanas live predominantly in Pakistan.
