= Mangali =

- Village
- Location in Haryana, India Mangali (India)
- Coordinates: 29°02′28″N 75°44′04″E
- Country: India
- State: Haryana
- District: Hisar

Government
  - Type: Local government
  - Body: Panchayat
- Elevation: 215 m (705 ft)

Languages
  - Official: Hindi
- Time zone: UTC+5:30 (IST)
- PIN: 125105
- Vehicle registration: HR
- Website: haryana.gov.in

Mangali, near Badya Jattan, is a village of more than 10,000 population with 5 gram panchayat (Mangali Aklan, Mangali Surtiya, Mangali Mohabbat, Mangali Dhani and Mangali Jhara) in it, the only village in Haryana having 5 panchayat in single village, of Hisar-1 Rural Development Block, Nalwa Chaudhry (Vidhan Sabha constituency) and Hisar (Lok Sabha constituency) of Hisar District of Hisar Division in the Haryana state of India.

It is situated 166 kilometres (103 mi) from the national capital Delhi and 14 kilometres (8.7 mi) from the district headquarters Hisar on the Hisar-Tosham road.

== History ==
=== During British Raj ===
Rao Shekha, a Shekhawat rajput (sub-branch of Kachwaha or Kushwaha), was the founder of Shekhawati, who originally divided Shekhawati into 33 Thikana (also called a Pargana). After him, additional thikanas were granted to the descendants of subsequent generations. Tosham Thikana was granted as a thikana by Shekhawati ruler Maharaja Mukund Singh in 1870 to Kunwar Abhaya Singh, the son of Maharaja Raj Singh II. During the Indian Rebellion of 1857, Hindu Shekhawat rajput officials of British Raj based at Tosham killed the Bhati and Ranghar Muslim Rajputs of Jamalpur and Mangali. These Hindu thakurs (Shekhawat) were granted the Thikana of Tosham as a Pargana under Shekhawati in 1870 by the British Raj] and Maharaja Mukund Singh for their services.

=== Post-independence ===
After Independence of India in 1947, it became part of Punjab. Once Haryana was formed as a separate state in 1966, it became part of the Hisar district, state of Haryana State.

== Transportation ==
Mangali is connected by road with Hisar, 10 km (6.2 mi) distant. The nearest major train stations are at Hisar, Hansi, which is 14 km (8.7 mi) away, and at Bhiwani city (60 km (37 mi)).

Hisar Airport, the nearest functional airport and flying training club is 14 km (8.7 mi) away. Currently no commercial domestic or international flights from this airport. The nearest domestic and international airports are 185 km (115 mi) at Indira Gandhi International Airport at Delhi and 235 km (146 mi) at Chandigarh International Airport.

== Revenue, Agriculture, Health and Other Services ==
There is a Patwari (Government Land Records Officer), an Agriculture Development Officer (ADO), a Rural Health Officer (RHO), and an Anganwadi (Community Childcare) worker based at village.

== See also ==
- Bidhwan
- Badya Jattan
- Badyan Brahmnan
- Kanwari
- Nalwa
- Tosham
