= Bidhwan =

- Village
- Location in Haryana, India Bidhwan (India)
- Coordinates: 28.759°N 75.606°E
- Country: India
- State: Haryana
- District: Bhiwani
- Tehsil: Siwani
- Elevation: 210 m (690 ft)

Population (2011)
  - Total: 2,868

Languages
  - Official: Hindi
- Time zone: UTC+5:30 (IST)
- PIN: 127046
- ISO 3166 code: IN-HR
- Vehicle registration: HR
- Website: haryana.gov.in

Bidhwan is a village and administrative unit with a democratically elected panchayat samiti (local council) in the Loharu (Vidhan Sabha constituency), Siwani Tehsil of Bhiwani District under Bhiwani-Mahendragarh Lok Sabha constituency and Hisar Division of Haryana state, India.

It is situated 53 kilometres (33 mi) from Hisar on the Hisar-Rajgarh road and 55 kilometres (34 mi) from the district headquarters Bhiwani.

== History ==
=== Bidhwan Jaglan Zail and Jaglan ===
Bidhwan is the seat of former "JaglanZail" headed by the Zaildar from the influential Jaglan clan, who during the British Raj, ruled over four revenue villages near Princely state of Loharu State, namely Bidhwan, Kalali (कलाली), Mandholi Khurd (मंढोली खुर्द) and Mandholi Kalan (मंढोलीकलां). Currently, these villages lie in the Bhiwani district. Descendants of the Jaglan clan still live in the village and they currently holds the position of Lambardar of Bidhwan village.

=== Nearby archaeological sites ===
Nearby Indus Valley civilization archaeological sites are Banawali, Lohari Ragho, Masudpur, Rakhigarhi, Siswal all with Hissar district as well as Burj and Bhirrana and Kunal and Balu in Fatehabad and Mitathal and Naurangabad in Bhiwani district. Other archaeological site are Agroha Mound where the original pillar of Ashoka was taken to Firoz Shah Palace Complex in Hisar.

== Administration ==
Currently, Bidhwan is under Bhiwani Zilla Panchayat and has its own unreserved Gram Panchayat under Gram Panchayat Smiti code 244115 and 2011 census village code 061301 and village name Bidhwan (113). As of August 2013, Sonu Khichar is the Sarpanch of the Gram Panchayat Smiti. There is a Patwari (government land record officer), an ADO (Agriculture Development Officer), a Rural Health Officer (RHO), and an Anganbadi Worker based at Bidhwan.

=== Government schemes ===
Bidhwan is covered by the Pradhan Mantri Awas Yojana, Deen Dayal Upadhyaya Gram Jyoti Yojana rural electrification scheme, and National Rural Employment Guarantee scheme.

== Demographics ==
Religions in Bidhwan as of 2011.
1. Hindus (100.0%)
2. Other (0.00%)

Demography of Bidhwan, 2011 Census
Category	Population
Number of households	750
Total population	4,500
Scheduled Caste	229
Literate population	2,016

As per a 20101 census, Bidhwan had 45% literacy rate (2016 out of 4500 residents) and 1890 cell-phone connections.

=== Jat gotras ===
The following Jat gotras are found in the village

- Khichar
- Beniwal
- Bisla
- Chahar
- Ghanghas
- Jaglan
- Malik(jadiya)
- Baloda
- Kulriya
- Nehra
- Poonia
- Repswal
- Saharan
- Sheoran
- Sura

=== Other gotras ===
- Dahima
- Baniya: Goyal
- Brahman: Bhardwaj
- Harijan: Nimal
- Khati: Jangra

== Education ==
Bidhwan International Public School (BIPS), owned by the descendants of Jaglan Zaildar clan, is the well known private school of the area.

There is also a subsidised Government School, Bidhwan. There are many more schools institutes and 3 universities at Hisar (60 km) and Bhiwani (53 km).

== Transportation ==
Bidhwan is well connected by the paved bitumen road. It lies from 7 km Jhumpa Khurd, 16 km Bahal, 19 km Siwani, 27 Rajgarh (Rajasthan), 31 Kairu, 53 km Hissar, 55 km Hansi, 47 km Pilani, and 58 km from Bhiwani, 165 km Delhi and 284 km from state capital Chandigarh.

=== Train connectivity ===
Nearest train stations on the Jakhal-Hisar-Sadalpur line are 7 km Jhumpa Khurd, 16 km Bahal and 19 km Siwani, Nearest major junctions are Sadulpur-Rajgarh Railway junction 34 km, Hisar Junction railway station 50 km (31 mi) and Bhiwani Junction railway station 60 km.

=== Airport connectivity ===
Hisar Airport, the nearest functional domestic airport and flying training club is 55 km (34 mi) away. Nearest international airport is 165 km (103 mi) at Delhi.

== Geography ==
Bidhwan is at the altitude of 210 m or 689 feet. Bidhwan lies in the semi-arid climate of the sandy bagar tract with scattered low sand dunes. Bidhwan has water ponds for the cattle. The fields are irrigated by the isharwal-Jhumpa distributary of Siwani branch of Western Yamuna Canal.

== Climate and ecology ==
=== Climate ===
Main ecological issues are desertification, deforestation, encroachment and land grabbing of common Panchayat forest and grazing land called "bani".

Climate data for Hisar (1991–2020 normals, extremes 1914–2020)
Month	Jan	Feb	Mar	Apr	May	Jun	Jul	Aug	Sep	Oct	Nov	Dec	Year
Record high °C (°F)	31.0 (87.8)	35.3 (95.5)	45.6 (114.1)	47.9 (118.2)	48.8 (119.8)	48.4 (119.1)	47.2 (117.0)	44.3 (111.7)	42.2 (108.0)	41.7 (107.1)	36.7 (98.1)	33.6 (92.5)	48.8 (119.8)
Mean daily maximum °C (°F)	19.6 (67.3)	24.2 (75.6)	30.1 (86.2)	37.5 (99.5)	41.4 (106.5)	40.8 (105.4)	37.3 (99.1)	35.9 (96.6)	35.8 (96.4)	34.4 (93.9)	28.9 (84.0)	22.7 (72.9)	32.3 (90.1)
Daily mean °C (°F)	13.3 (55.9)	17.2 (63.0)	22.9 (73.2)	29.2 (84.6)	33.7 (92.7)	34.0 (93.2)	32.3 (90.1)	31.2 (88.2)	30.1 (86.2)	26.6 (79.9)	20.5 (68.9)	15.2 (59.4)	25.5 (77.9)
Mean daily minimum °C (°F)	6.7 (44.1)	9.8 (49.6)	14.8 (58.6)	20.6 (69.1)	25.3 (77.5)	27.6 (81.7)	27.5 (81.5)	26.8 (80.2)	24.6 (76.3)	19.1 (66.4)	12.8 (55.0)	7.7 (45.9)	18.5 (65.3)
Record low °C (°F)	−3.9 (25.0)	−2.2 (28.0)	2.8 (37.0)	6.6 (43.9)	13.5 (56.3)	17.8 (64.0)	20.1 (68.2)	20.0 (68.0)	14.0 (57.2)	8.3 (46.9)	2.5 (36.5)	−1.5 (29.3)	−3.9 (25.0)
Average rainfall mm (inches)	12.7 (0.50)	17.4 (0.69)	18.2 (0.72)	11.4 (0.45)	31.2 (1.23)	70.8 (2.79)	123.1 (4.85)	118.4 (4.66)	76.5 (3.01)	7.2 (0.28)	2.6 (0.10)	4.4 (0.17)	494.0 (19.45)
Average rainy days	1.3	1.5	1.6	1.3	2.3	4.1	6.2	5.9	3.3	0.7	0.3	0.5	28.8
Average relative humidity (%) (at 17:30 IST)	60	51	41	25	25	38	58	62	56	44	49	58	47
Source 1: India Meteorological Department
Source 2: Tokyo Climate Center (mean temperatures 1991–2020)

=== Fauna ===
Animals and birds of various species are found including sparrow, large Indian parakeet, parrot, crow, rat, rabbit, nilgai, pied crested cuckoo, koel, pheasant, kingfisher, bulbul and Indian magpie robin.

== Notable people ==
- Jaglan Zaildar-cum-Nambardar clan
  - Ch. Ramswaroop Jaglan Mahashay ji, freedom fighter, multiple national medal winners in masters athletics.
  - Ch. Risal Singh Jaglan (nephew of Ch. Ramswaroop Jaglan Mahashay ji), multiple national medal winners in masters athletics.
  - Ch. Surat Singh Jaglan (brother of Ch. Risal Singh), multiple national medal winners in masters athletics and Indian Army veteran.
  - Harpyari Devi Jaglan Dhillon (youngest sister of Ch. Risal Singh and Subedar Surat Singh Jaglan), multiple national medal winners in masters athletics.
- Others
  - Krishna Poonia (born 5 May 1982), an international gold-medalist Indian discus thrower, 2004, 2008 and 2012 Olympian, Padma Shri awardee, politician of Congress party and the current MLA from Sadulpur constituency in Rajasthan, her ancestral place was Bidhwan village, her family migrated to Agroha where she was born.

== See also ==
- Badya Jattan
- Barwas
- Dhillon
- Kanwari
