= Barwas =

- village
- Location in Haryana, India Barwas (India)
- Coordinates: 28.4814°N 75.8770°E
- Country: India
- State: Haryana
- District: Bhiwani
- Founder: Baru

Population (2016)
  - Total: 3,500

Languages
- Time zone: UTC+5:30 (IST)
- PIN: 127201
- Telephone code: 01252
- ISO 3166 code: IN-HR
- Vehicle registration: HR 18
- pilani rajasthan: Loharu
- Climate: warm (Köppen)
- Website: haryana.gov.in

Barwas is a village in Loharu Tehsil of Bhiwani district in Haryana, India.

== Administration ==
Currently, it is under Bhiwani Zilla Panchayat and has its own unreserved Gram Panchayat under Gram Panchayat Smiti. There is a Patwari (government land record officer), an ADO (Agriculture Development Officer), a Rural Health Officer (RHO), and an Anganbadi Worker.For political representational purposes the village is part of Loharu Assembly constituency and the Bhiwani-Mahendragarh Lok Sabha constituency.

== See also ==
- Bidhwan
- Badya Jattan
- Mandholi Kalan
- Kanwari
- Zaildar
- List of Zaildars by Zail
