= Balsamand =

- village
- Balsamand in Haryana, India Balsamand (India)
- Coordinates: 29.0729554°N 75.478928°E
- Country: India
- State: Haryana
- District: Hisar

Government
  - Type: Local government
  - Body: Panchayat

Languages
  - Official: Hindi
- Time zone: UTC+5:30 (IST)
- PIN: 125001
- Vehicle registration: HR
- Website: haryana.gov.in

Balsamnd, is a village in Hisar-II block of Hisar District of Hisar Division and Hisar (Lok Sabha constituency) in the Haryana state of India.

== Facilities ==
Industrial training institute and Grain Mandi market were opened here in 2006. There is a Haryana Police post, State Bank of India, ICICI Bank, Punjab National Bank.

== Education ==
Maharani Lakshmi Bai Post Graduate College, Bhiwani Rohilla is nearby in Bhiwnai Rohilla village. It offer B.A., B.Com., B.Sc., M.A. and M.Com. degrees from its affiliate Kurukshetra University.

== See also ==
- Bidhwan
- Kanwari
- Badyan Brahmnan
- Norangpura
