= Sundawas =

- Village
- Location in Haryana, India Sundawas (India)
- Coordinates: 29.104505°N 75.521693°E
- Country: India
- State: Haryana
- District: Hisar
- Block: Hisar-2
- Founder: Sunda Punia

Government
  - Type: Village Council
  - Body: Panchayat

Area
  - Total: 6.78 km^{2} (2.62 sq mi)

Population (2011)
  - Total: 2,647
  - Density: 390/km^{2} (1,010/sq mi)
- Demonym: Haryanvi

Languages
  - Official: Hindi
- Time zone: UTC+5:30 (IST)
- PIN: 125004
- Telephone code: 911662
- ISO 3166 code: IN-HR
- Vehicle registration: HR-20
- Sex ratio: 1000/917 ♂/♀
- Parliament constituency: Hisar
- State Legislative Constituency: Adampur
- Tehsil: Balsamand
- Website: haryana.gov.in

Sundawas is a village in Hisar and district in the Indian state of Haryana. Sundawas is located on Balsamad Road via Siswala around 24 km away from District center Hisar (city). The village is located near to eastern border of Rajasthan, just 10 km away. It is the last village on the Haryana side with fertile black soil.

== History ==
As per government of India 1981 records Village was also known as Sundawala. Sundawas was connected modern road via siswala - Sundawas road during 1973. It took almost a decade when next road was notified for village. Sundawas was connected with balsamand via road in 1984.

== Government ==
Sundawas village is administered by Gram Panchayat Sundawas under the provisions of the constitution of India and Panchayati raj (India)

Gram Panchayat of Sundawas comprises ten ward members and one Sarpanch. Mr. Sampat is the current Sarpanch of Sundawas.

Sarpanch of Sundawas
Year	Name	Category
2022	Mr. Sampat karwasra	General

== Law and Order ==
Sundawas falls under the Sadar Hisar police station. Near police beat is situated in Balsamand

=== Notable Cases ===
October 9, 2001, 6 person were seriously hurt in a group clash between two student groups of Sundawas and Rawalwas village at Chandan Nagar near Hisar. As per report there was incident of gun fire. Police FIR was registered against students involved in attack.

== Demography ==
Sundawas had 2600 people as per 2011 census by Indian Government. Village has only Hindu religion follower.

Population
Year	Household	Total	Male	Female	SC Male	SC Female	Literate Male	Literate Female
2011	471	2,647	1,381	1,266	273	247	997	660
1974	164	1233	632	601	281	145	162	24
1969	-	840	-	-	-	-	-	-

== Education ==
=== School Education ===
There are four schools in Sundawas. 3 State government funded and 1 private school.

List of Schools in Sundawas
SNO	Name	Type	Funded	Grade	Recognized
1	Government Senior Secondary School	Co-ed	Government	6th to 12th	Yes
2	Government Primary School	Co-ed	Government	Nursery to 5th	Yes
3	Government Girls Primary School	Girls only	Government	Nursery to 5th	Yes
4	NEW ADARSH MIDDLE SCHOOL SUNDAWAS	Co-ed	Private	Nursery to 8th	Yes

Government Senior Secondary School also provides admission to pupil from Siswala village.

=== Higher education ===
Sundawas does not have collage for university level education. Following are the nearest collage for higher education.

List of Higher Education institutes near Sundawas
Type	Name of Institute	Type of Courses offered	Location	Website	Funded
I.T.I	Govt. I.T.I. Balsamand	Vocational post highschool	balsamand	http://itibalsamand.org/	Haryana State Government
I.T.I	Govt. I.T.I. Hisar	Vocational post highschool	Hisar (city)	http://itihisar.edu.in/	Haryana State Government
I.T.I	SHREE BALA JI PITI HISAR	Vocational post highschool	balsamand		Private
Polytechnic	Govt. Polytechnic, Hisar	Technical Diploma post higher secondary school	Hisar (city)	http://www.gphisar.ac.in/	Haryana State Government
College	Govt College Balsamand	Under graduate - G.J. University	balsamand		Haryana State Government

== Health ==
Sundawas has a sub primary health center, 2 Pharmacy. There are no doctors in the village.

Nearest Hospital is 6 km away in balsamand

== Economy and infrastructure ==
Majority of people work in farming sector. Poor people from backward communities are offered jobs under National Rural Employment Guarantee Act, 2005 in village by Gram Panchayat.

== Transport ==
=== Road ===
Sundawas is well connected via road with village Siswala in east, Balsamand in west, BHIWANI ROHILLA in north and Dobhi and Kharia in South. Nearest highway is Hisar-Bhadra road can be accessed via Bhiwani Rohilla village in 4 km distance.

Haryana Roadway Bus service provides connectivity from Sundawas to Hisar (city), balsamand, Kharia on daily basis. No good service of buses in the village only 2-3 buses only provide service

=== Rail ===
Sundawas does not have any railway station within 10 km proximity. Nearest railway major railway station is Hisar Junction railway station in 24 km distance. Hisar Junction provides connectivity to Delhi, Mumbai, Jaipur, udaipur, Chandigarh Jodhpur, Vaishno Devi, Hyderabad, gorakhpur, ahmedabad

=== Air ===
Hisar Airport (30 km) is nearest domestic airport to Sundawas. Indira Gandhi International Airport Delhi is nearest (193 km via road) international airport which provides connectivity to major countries. Chandigarh Airport is second nearest international airport with 264 km distance via road. Hisar airport (Maharaja Agrasen airport) 24 km form sundawas

== In News ==
Protests were held against the state government on 4 November 2014 related to a water crisis in 30 villages of Adampur. Sundawas was one of the beneficiaries of Balsamand Canal for drinking and irrigation water. The government over the year had reduced the water supply to this canal. Farmers demanded two week supply against one week supply in a month. The BJP Government promised but did not provide water until the article was added.

On 17 January 2018 Harpal Dhayal Pass the Chartered Accountancy Course and Become First Chartered Accountant of Village

On 21 October 2022, Sundawas featured in TV Total Haryana amid of Adampur Constituency Byelection. All the political parties were tried their best to get the votes. although majority people of Sundawas voted for Congress still Mr Bhavya Bishnoi won the overall election by great margin. He was able to secure 51.32% votes (67492 votes out of 131523)
