= Chahra =

Village in Punjab province, Pakistan

- Village
- Location in Pakistan
- Coordinates: 32°32′38″N 74°02′22″E
- Country: Pakistan
- Province: Punjab
- District: Gujrat
- Tehsil: Gujrat

Population (2017)
  - Total: 626
- Time zone: UTC+5 (PST)

Chahra (Punjabi, Urdu: چاھڑہ, also spelled Chara) is a village in Gujrat District in the Punjab Province of Pakistan. Chahra is about 15 km from Gujrat city.

According to 2017 Census of Pakistan, its population consists of 626 people in 105 households. The majority of the population belongs to the Gujjar caste.

Nearby villages include Malikpur, Kot Bela, Miana Kot and the town of Deona.

There is a Govt. Girls Primary School in the village.
