= Bharinda =

Village in Rajasthan

Coordinates: 28°32′54.7″N 75°36′17.6″E

Bharinda is a small village in the tehsil of Rajgarh in Churu district in the state of Rajasthan in India.

The gram panchayat of the area is the neighbouring village of Bhainsali.

Population - 2500 (estimated in 2009)

Voters - 850
