= Kaimri =

Kaimri may refer to:

- Kaimri, Hisar, village in Hisar district, Haryana, India.
- Kaimri, Rajasthan, village in Karauli district, Rajasthan, India.
- Kaimri, Estonia, village in Saaremaa Parish, Saare County, Estonia.
