= Dalal =

Dalal may refer to:

- Dalal, alternative name for the black grasswren of Western Australia
- Dalal (given name), a given name list
- Dalal (surname), a surname list
- Dalal Street, financial street in Mumbai, India

== See also ==
- Includes persons with the forename or surname Dalal
- Dalaal, 1993 Indian film by Partho Ghosh, starring Mithun Chakraborty
- Jalal, an Arabic name
