= Haveli Bata =

- Village
- Location within Pakistan
- Coordinates: 31.29°N 72.50°E
- Country: Pakistan
- Province: Punjab
- District: Chiniot

Government
  - Numberdar: Mian Muhammad Bakhsh Bata

Area
  - Total: 1 km^{2} (0.39 sq mi)

Population (2021)
  - Total: 6,000
- Time zone: UTC+5 (PST)

Haveli Bata is a village of Bhawana in Punjab, Pakistan. Many residents of the village are from the Bata caste. This village is near Jhang Chiniot on a distance of 1 KM. Many other castes also live here such as Kumhar, Jopo, Kuriana Sial, Mahon, Machi, Tarkhan. Main Muhammad Bakhash Bata is the numberdar of this village. Many peoples are serving in government departments, like Pak Army Education Bank, and in the textile industry. Hakeem Ul Ummat Mehr Umar Draz Sial is the famous personality in this village. Chaudhary Rizwan Shoaib Kiryana Store is main General Store in this village.
