= Government School, Bidhwan =

Location
- Bidhwan, Bhiwani district, Haryana, India
- Coordinates: 28.759°N 75.606°E

Information
- School type: Public funded
- School district: Hisar district
- Gender: Co-educational
- Age: 3 to 18
- Website: www.schooleducationharyana.gov.in

Government School, Bidhwan is a government funded school located in Bidhwan village of Siwani tehsil of Bhiwani district in the Indian state of Haryana. Established in 1970, this is a prominent school of the area for being one of the earliest known school of the district for the rural education.

== History ==
A government co-educational primary school existed since 1970, which was progressively upgraded to middle and then to high secondary school.

The school also operates Anganwadi.

== Academics ==
The schools offer classes till 10th.

== See also ==
- Haryana Board of School Education
- Department of Elementary Education, Haryana
- Department of School Education, Haryana
