= Norangpura =

- Village
- Location in Rajasthan, India Norangpura (India)
- Coordinates: 28.3743°N 75.4563°E
- Country: India
- State: Rajasthan
- District: Churu district

Government
  - Type: Local government
  - Body: Panchayat

Languages
  - Official: Hindi
- Time zone: UTC+5:30 (IST)

Norangpura, near Chandgothi, is a village of less than 7,000 population, in Churu district of Rajasthan state of India. Clockwise, Rajgarh (Sadalpur) is 40 km, in north-east are Chandgothi 10 km and Hisar 110 km, in east are Pilani 20 km and Loharu 42 km and national capital Delhi 105 km, in south Jhunjhunu 31 km and state capital Jaipur 160 km, and in west Churu 65 km.

Clockwise from north, it is 50 km south of Rajgarh (Sadalpur), 110 km south west of Hisar, 295 km south west of Chandigarh, 10 km south west of Chandgothi, 20 km west of Pilani, 42 km west of Loharu, 105 km west of national capital Delhi, 31 km north of Jhunjhunu, 160 km north of state capital Jaipur and 65 km east of Churu.

This village has many schools and medical options, also. it is an educated village among all the nearest villages. Many people are rendering their service for Aam forces. It has play grounds, roads to all nearest villages and cities.

== Jat gotras ==
The following Jat gotras are found in the village:{Kulhari} Bhuria

== Revenue, agriculture, health and other services ==
There is a Patwari (Government Land Records Officer), an Agriculture Development Officer (ADO), a Rural Health Officer (RHO), a post office, a primary and a higher secondary govt school and an Anganwadi (Community Childcare) worker based at village.

== Jan Sahayak e-governance services ==
Government of India e-governance services can be availed online at their website for various govt departments including land & revenue (land rights and ownership records), transport (driving license and vehicle registration), health (birth and death certificates), public health (water and sewage connection), food (ration cards), Power (electricity connection) and HUDA or Municipal Committee/council (house tax and building plans), etc.
