= Lambra =

Village in Punjab, India

Lambra Labaṛā
- Village
- Lambra Kangri
- Location in Punjab, India Lambra (India)
- Coordinates: 31.606°N 75.798°E
- Country: India
- State: Punjab
- District: Hoshiarpur

Area
  - Total: 201 ha (500 acres)
- Elevation: 296 m (971 ft)

Population (2011)
  - Total: 1,673
- Time zone: UTC+5:30 (IST)
- PIN: 146113

Lambra Kangri, or more commonly known by the name Lambra (not to be confused with Lambra, Jalandhar 144026) is a medium-sized village located in Punjab, India. The post office of Lambra comes under the village of Lambra Kangri or Bulhowal of which bears the pin code of 146113.

== Geography ==
The coordinates of Lambra are 31.606°N 75.798°E. The village is located in the Hoshiarpur Tehsil, of the Hoshiarpur district, in Punjab, India. Thus located in the Doaba region of Punjab. Neighbouring population centres include, Hoshiarpur City which lies 21.1 kilometres (13.1 miles); Jalandhar, 45.5 kilometres (28.3 miles), and Ludhiana, 95.7 kilometres (59.5 miles). It is located 154 kilometres (95.7 miles) from the capital of Punjab, Chandigarh. Lambra's average elevation above sea level is 296 metres (971 feet).

== Demographics ==
According to the Population Census conducted in 2011.

- The total population of Lambra is 1,673, with 850 male and 823 female.
- The literacy rate of Lambra is 89.54%. This figure is higher than the state average [Punjab] of 75.84%.
- The male literacy rate is 93.31% and the female literacy rate is 85.75%.
- 618 individuals are a part of the workforce, with 403 male and 215 female.
- There is a total of 346 houses.

There is no information related to the religious statistics of the village however is estimated to have a Sikh region alike the rest of the region.

== Governance ==
Alike other villages of similar size within the Punjab region, the village appoints a Sarpanch who is elected through local election processes. The Sarpanch of Lambra acts in the best interests of the village. There are also 5-6 Panch, they aid in the Sarpanch's duties as being in the committee. Also within the village there are 3 Lambardar(i) is prominent in the decision making of other areas.

== Places of worship ==
Some notable places of worship located within Lambra include.

- Gurduwara Singh Sabha
- Gurduwara Om Darbar Bapu Thakur Ji Maharaj
- Gurudwara Guru Ravidas Sabha
- Tharha Sahib

== Facilities ==
Lambra Kangri Multipurpose Co-operative Service Society, an association based within Lambra, also known as LAMKAMCOS LTD. for short, was registered on 27 July 1920. The society has been found to work on projects that involve in renewable energy sources in Lambra and surrounding villages. A popular project of LAMKAMCOS LTD. is the development of a village biogas plant, a sustainable source of energy. Some residents of Lambra have been able to switch from the traditional, standard LPG cylinders to biogas. An exact measure of people that are able to make this switch is not confirmed.

Another development of LAMKAMCOS LTD. is a wastewater treatment plant situated within the village. The plant treats wastewater using rice husk ash as a filtration mechanism, with the entire system being dependant on solar energy. Treated grey-water is used for groundwater recharge and irrigation to aid the agricultural landscape of Lambra. The product facilitates to 300-400 households within the village.

The projects of LAMKAMCOS LTD. in Lambra has received a considerable amount of press from mainstream Indian media such as DownToEarth, the Hindustan Times, and the Tribune India.
