= Mahalana =

District in India

Coordinates: 28°42′33″N 75°10′55″E

Mahalana is a village in Rajgarh (Rajasthan) tehsil, district Churu, Rajasthan, India.

The village has four divisions: Mahalana Utrada, Mahalana Dikhnada, Mahalana Bichla and Dhatarwala.

The distance of the village from its tehsil Sadulpur is 27 km; another near city is Taranager's with a distance of 15 km. Mahalana village has the largest panchayat of in Rajgarh (Sadulpur) panchayat simiti.

The population of the village is around 5000, with a total number of homes are around 550.
