= Kaimri, Hisar =

Kaimri
- Village
- Location in Haryana, India Kaimri (India)
- Coordinates: 29.0811°N 75.7177°E
- Country: India
- State: Haryana
- District: Hisar

Population (2001)
  - Total: 7,204

Languages
  - Official: Hindi
- Time zone: UTC+5:30 (IST)
- PIN: 125001
- Telephone code: 911662
- ISO 3166 code: IN-HR
- Vehicle registration: HR-20
- Sex ratio: 1000/870 ♂/♀
- Website: haryana.gov.in

Kaimri is a village in Hisar tehsil and district in the Indian state of Haryana.

== History ==
According to the data maintained by the Government of India's Department of Statistics, the Govt Primary School Kaimri was established in 1943, which was upgraded to a high school in 1967 and to senior secondary school in 1997.

== Occupation ==
Main occupation of people is agriculture and government/private jobs. Some villagers are employed in government services and many people are doing private jobs.

== Transport ==
Kaimri is connected to nearby villages through the road network with presence of State Transport Service and Private Bus Services which link it to Amardeep colony and beyond to Hisar.

== Geography ==
Kaimri is located at Hisar-Kaimri road.

== Demographics ==
=== Demographics as per 2001 census ===
As of 2001 India Census, Kaimri had a population of 7204. Male population is 3853, while female population is 3351.

=== Demographics as per 2011 census ===
As of 2011 India census, Kaimri had a population of 8399 in 1584 households. Males (4443) constitute 52.89% of the population and females (3956) 47.1%. Kaimri has an average literacy (4968) rate of 59.14%, more than the national average of 74%: male literacy (3018) is 60.74%, and female literacy (1950) is 39.25%. In Kaimri, 11.31% of the population is under 6 years of age (950).

== Facilities ==
Kaimri village has government school, dispensary, etc. It is also the home of Shri Krishan Pranami Bal Sewa Ashram, Kaimri charitable orphanage and free school. It also contain a Sankatmochan Kaimridham balaji mandir where peoples come from different cities of India.

== See also ==
- Kaimri (disambiguation)
- Bidhwan
- Dhillon
- Hansi City and Tehsil
- Haryana
- Hissar
- Hisar division
- Hisar (Lok Sabha constituency)
- Hisar Urban Agglomeration
- India
- Jat
- Siwani
- Tosham
