= Dalal (surname) =

Dalal is a surname. Notable people with the surname include:

- Anila Dalal, Gujarati critic and translator
- Dadiba Merwanji Dalal, Indian diplomat
- Dinanath Dalal, Indian painter
- Hussain Dalal, actor and writer
- Jai Parkash Dalal, Indian politician
- Karamjyoti Dalal, Indian para-athlete
- Karan Singh Dalal, Indian politician
- Kavita Dalal, Indian wrestler
- Jayanti Dalal, Indian author and politician
- Maneck Dalal, Indian aviation manager
- Naresh Dalal, physical chemist
- Rahul Dalal, Indian cricketer
- Roshen Dalal, Indian writer
- Sucheta Dalal, Indian journalist
- Tarla Dalal, Indian food writer
- Yair Dalal, Israeli musician
- Yamini Dalal, Indian biochemist
- Yogen K Dalal, Indian engineer and Internet pioneer
