= Om Parkash Barwa =

Indian politician

Om Parkash Barwa was a member of the Haryana Legislative Assembly from the INLD representing the Loharu Vidhan sabha constituency in Haryana. He served during 2014–2019 term.
