= Chandgothi =

- Village
- Location in Haryana, India Chandgothi (India)
- Coordinates: 28.4254°N 75.5345°E
- Country: India
- State: Rajasthan
- District: Churu district

Government
  - Type: Local government
  - Body: Panchayat

Languages
  - Official: Hindi
- Time zone: UTC+5:30 (IST)
- PIN: 331305
- Vehicle registration: RJ10

Chandgothi, near Pilani, is a village of less than 7,000 in the Churu district of Rajasthan state of India. It is 13 km from Pilani, 95 km from Churu, 100 km from Hisar, 170 km from the state capital Jaipur, 240 km the from national capital New Delhi.

== History ==
After the independence of India in 1947, it became part of Churu district.

== Revenue, Agriculture, Health and Other Services ==
There is a Patwari (Government Land Records Officer), an agriculture development officer, a rural health officer, and an Anganwadi (community childcare) worker based at village.

== Jan Sahayak e-Governance Services ==
Government of India e-governance services can be availed online at their website for various government departments including land and revenue (land rights and ownership records), transport (driving license and vehicle registration), health (birth and death certificates), public health (water and sewer connection), food (ration cards), power (electricity connection) and HUDA or municipal committee/council (house tax and building plans).
