= Rajbir Fartia =

Indian politician

Member of Haryana Legislative Assembly
- Incumbent
- Assumed office 8 October 2024
- Preceded by: Jai Parkash Dalal
- Constituency: Loharu

Personal details
- Party: Indian National Congress
- Profession: Politician

Rajbir Singh Fartia is an Indian politician from Haryana. He is a Member of the Haryana Legislative Assembly from 2024, representing Loharu Assembly constituency as a member of the Indian National Congress.

== See also ==
- 2024 Haryana Legislative Assembly election
- Haryana Legislative Assembly
