= Badyan Brahmnan =

Badya Brahmnan
- Village
- Location in Haryana, India Badya Brahmnan (India)
- Coordinates: 28.9837°N 75.7556°E
- Country: India
- State: Haryana
- District: Hisar

Government
  - Type: Local government
  - Body: Panchayat
- Elevation: 215 m (705 ft)

Languages
  - Official: Hindi
- Time zone: UTC+5:30 (IST)
- PIN: 125037
- Vehicle registration: HR
- Website: haryana.gov.in

Badya Brahmnan, next to Badya Jattan, is a village of less than 7,000 population, in Hisar-1 Rural Development Block, Nalwa Chaudhry (Vidhan Sabha constituency) and Hisar (Lok Sabha constituency) of Hisar District of Hisar Division in the Haryana state of India.

It is situated 166 kilometres (103 mi) from the national capital Delhi and 24 kilometres (15 mi) from the district headquarters Hisar on the Hisar-Tosham road.

== History ==
After the independence of India in 1947, it became part of Punjab. Once Haryana was formed as a separate state in 1966, it became part of the Hisar district, in the state of Haryana.

Village has an old temple called Dadi Gauri Mandir dhok (Haryanvi: धोक, meaning worship), bhaiyan (Haryanvi: भईयाँ, from भूमिया or of land), or baba Jabarnaath Mandir, or jathera (Punjabi: जठेरा, from जेष्ठ which means elder) village ancestor deity which is the abode of village deity where newlyweds go for blessings before entering the village.

== Brahmin gotras ==
The following Brahmin gotras are found in the village.

- Galav Brahman
- Jangra

== Transportation ==
=== Road ===
It is well-connected by the Matelled Asphalt (paved bitumen) road with Hisar (city) 24 km.

=== Train connectivity ===
The village does not have a rail station. Nearest major train stations accessible by road are 24 km (15 mi) at Hisar, 24 km (15 mi) at Hansi and 45 km at Bhiwani city.

=== Airport connectivity ===
Hisar Airport, the nearest functional airport and flying training club is 24 km (15 mi) away. Currently no commercial domestic or international flights from this airport. Nearest domestic and international airports are 200 km (120 mi) at Indira Gandhi International Airport at Delhi and 260 km (160 mi) Chandigarh International Airport.

== Revenue, agriculture, health and other services ==
There is a Patwari (Government Land Records Officer), an Agriculture Development Officer (ADO), a Rural Health Officer (RHO), and an Anganwadi (Community Childcare) worker based at village.Most of Villager are in transportation business,

== See also ==
- Bidhwan
- Badya Jattan
- Kanwari
