= Siswala =

- Village
- Kheri Jalab in Haryana, India Siswala (India)
- Coordinates: 29.102200°N 75.549982°E
- Country: India
- State: Haryana
- District: Hisar

Government
  - Type: Local government
  - Body: Panchayat

Languages
  - Official: Hindi
- Time zone: UTC+5:30 (IST)
- PIN: 125052
- Vehicle registration: HR-20
- Website: haryana.gov.in

Siswala is a village in the Hisar district of Haryana, India. It is 19 km west of Hisar, near the Rajasthan border.

== Demographics ==
The population of the village is approximately 3,442. The main occupation of most peoples is agriculture, and a few people are employed in the Indovax Company, which is 2 km outside the village. This company has given employment to hundreds of people from the Siswala village and nearby villages Kirtan, Rawalwas and Kharia.

== Government ==
The village has a local administration called panchayat. The head of the panchayat is known as the sarpanch.

== Culture ==
The village has people from all the communities but the majority include Jat(42%) and Kumhar(22%). The village has two Hindu temples and one Gurudwara.

== Resources and infrastructure ==
The agricultural land in the village is irrigated by a canal, or rajbaha, known as Balsamand Minor and by a few tube wells. The village has two ponds for drinking water for cattle: Pili Johari and Johar. Drinking water is supplied from a water supply system situated outside the village operated by the state government. Power is available from a substation built in 2007.

== Transportation ==
Siswala is accessible by road transport from the nearest city, Hisar. A few bus services operate regularly during the day, including Haryana Roadways and Ganga Jamuna.
