= Kaimri, Rajasthan =

Kaimri
- Village
- Interactive map of Kaimri
- Coordinates: 26.7030238°N 76.7423094000001°E
- Country: India
- State: Rajasthan
- District: Karauli district

Government
  - Body: Gram panchayat

Languages
  - Official: Hindi
- Time zone: UTC+5:30 (IST)
- ISO 3166 code: RJ-IN
- Vehicle registration: RJ-

Karauli district in Rajasthan

Kaimri is a village in Karauli district of Rajasthan State in India.

The Kaimri village has population of 2657 of which 1459 are males while 1198 are females as per Population Census 2011.

The location code or village code of Kaimri village is 076383.

Kaimri village is also a gram panchayat.

The total geographical area of village is 533.03 hectares.

== Location ==
Kaimri village is located in Nadoti Tehsil of Karauli district in Rajasthan, India. It is situated 6 km away from sub-district headquarter Nadoti and 56 km away from district headquarter Karauli.

Gangapur City is nearest town to Kaimri which is approximately 34 km away.

Kaimri village is located around 96.6 kilometer away from the state capital Jaipur. Its distance from Delhi is 223.4 km., Raipur is 280.7 km. and Lucknow 382.8 km.

The nearest railway station to Kaimri is Khandip which is located in and around 19.1 kilometer distance.

Kaimri‘s nearest airport are Jaipur International Airport at 94.0 km, Agra Air Force Station 131.2 km. and Gwalior Airport 154.4 km.

== Population ==
The Kaimri village has population of 2657 of which 1459 are males while 1198 are females as per Population Census 2011. There are about 489 houses in Kaimri village.

In Kaimri village population of children with age 0-6 is 443 which makes up 16.67% of total population of village. Average Sex Ratio of Kaimri village is 821 which is lower than Rajasthan state average of 928. Child Sex Ratio for the Kaimri as per census is 724, lower than Rajasthan average of 888.

== Literacy rate ==
Kaimri village has higher literacy rate compared to Rajasthan. In 2011, literacy rate of Kaimri village was 69.69% compared to 66.11% of Rajasthan. In Kaimri Male literacy stands at 88.85% while female literacy rate was 46.94%.

== Head of Village ==
As per constitution of India and Panchyati Raaj Act, Kaimri village is administrated by Sarpanch (Head of Village) who is elected representative of village.

== The official language of Kaimri ==
The native language of Kaimri is Hindi and most of the village people speak Hindi. Kaimri people use Hindi language for communication.

== Kaimri Sun rise time ==
Kaimri village is located in the UTC 5.30 time zone and it follows indian standard time (IST). Kaimri sun rise time varies 21 minutes from IST.

== Information for drivers ==
The vehicle driving side in Kaimri is left, all vehicles should take left side during driving.

== Currency ==
Kaimri people are using its national currency which is Indian Rupee and its international currency code is INR.

== Schools in and around Kaimri ==
Kaimri nearest schools has been listed as follows.

Govt School Roshi	10.6 km
Govt Middle School Rampura	11.5 km
Hi Rajpal Govt School Of Ranoli	12.6 km
Primary School Karwadi	12.7 km.
Privet School	13.7 km
