= Jai Parkash Dalal =

Indian politician

Jai Parkash Dalal is an Indian politician. He was elected to the Haryana Legislative Assembly from Loharu in the 2019 Haryana Legislative Assembly election as a member of the Bharatiya Janata Party. He served as the Agriculture, Farmer Welfare, Animal husbandry, Fisheries and Law and Legislature Minister from 2019 to 13 March 2024. Thereafter he served as the Finance Minister along with the portfolio of Town and Country Planning and Estates. In the 2024 Assembly elections, Rajbir Singh Fartia defeated Dalal from Loharu constituency. He contested assembly elections in 2009 independently by gaining support from Kiran Chaudhary, however he lost by a small margin of votes. He joined BJP in 2014, and served many positions in party such as State Vice President, Incharge of BJP Kisan Cell, and Jind District Incharge.
