= Kanwari =

- Village
- Kanwari
- Kanwari in Haryana, India
- Coordinates: 28°58′30″N 75°49′12″E
- Country: India
- State: Haryana
- District: Hisar
- Named for: Bua Kanwari (Virgin Goddess)

Government
  - Type: Local government
  - Body: Panchayat
  - Sarpanch: Kartar Singh Sheoran
- Elevation: 215 m (705 ft)

Population (2010)
  - Total: 5,733

Hindi
  - Official: Hindi
- Time zone: UTC+5:30 (IST)
- PIN: 125037
- Vehicle registration: HR
- Website: haryana.gov.in

Kanwari, also spelled Kunwari, or Kwari, is a village of 7,000 population, in Hansi-I Tehsil, Hisar-1 Rural Development Block, Hansi Assembly constituency and Hisar Lok Sabha constituency of Hisar District of Hisar Division in the Haryana state of India. It is part of the saat bas bhaichara grouping of 7 villages. The village has 4 panna/patti (subdivisions), named as Nangalia Panna (dominated by Garhwal gotra), upparla Panna (dominated by Duhan gotra), parla Panna (dominated by Sheoran gotra), etc. with a total revenue land area of 43903 kanal or 5487 acre as per HALRIS records.

It is situated 260 kilometres (160 mi) from the state capital Chandigarh, 166 kilometres (103 mi) from the national capital Delhi, 24 kilometres (15 mi) from the district headquarter Hisar, 42 kilometres (26 mi) from Bhiwani and 12 kilometres (7.5 mi) from the Tosham Hill range beginning at Khanak.

== History ==
In the Kanwari archaeological mound, Painted Gray Ware (PGW) and later historic artifacts were found. The PGW Culture corresponds to the middle and late Vedic period, i.e., the Kuru-Panchala kingdom, the first large state in the Indian subcontinent after the decline of the Indus Valley Civilisation.

Archaeological Survey of India's explorations, as reported in the "Indian Archaeological Review 1978-79" (page 8), found early historical and late medieval artifacts at Kanwari. Late medieval artifacts included 9th and 10th century temple [of Kaumari in Nagara architecture from the times of Tomara dynasty rule who were vassals of Pratiharas until 10th century]. The earliest extant historical reference to the Tomaras rule in Haryana occurs in the Pehowa inscription issued during the reign of the Pratihara king Mahendrapala I (r. c. 885-910 CE). Inscription states that Jaula of the Tomara family became prosperous by serving an unnamed king; and his descendants were Vajrata, Jajjuka and Gogga; Gogga was a vassal of Mahendrapala I; Gogga and his step-brothers Purna-raja and Deva-raja constructed three Vishnu temples at Prithudaka (Pehowa) on the banks of the Sarasvati River (Ghaggar River). F. Kielhorn suggested that this Tomara family actually resided in Delhi: they may have visited Pehowa on pilgrimage, and built a temple there.

In 2022, while ploughing his sandy field with the tractor, on Kanwari-Badya Jattan Road on the western side of Kanwari, a farmer found a 70–80 kg heavy 2 ft x 2 ft buff sandstone ancient statue of Vishnu accompanied by depiction of 14 other Hindu deities around it, including Shiva and Ganesha, in the same style as 9th-13th century Khajuraho Group of Monuments. Slim and small ancient bricks were also found. An in-situ temple has been built. In 1986 also a buried ancient statue was accidentally discovered in the village and in-situ Chuganwali Mata temple was built for it too on the west of village. A well preserved ancient buff sandstone panel showing Revanta, youngest son of the sun-god Surya and his wife Saranyu, is now fixed in the wall of the Brāhmaņa dharmaśālā in the middle of the village of Kanwari.

The medieval temple of dhok of village ancestor deity at Kanwari explored by ASI in 1978-79 is called the Bua Kanwari Dham, where newlyweds go for blessings before entering the village. Dhok is also called Bhaiyan and Jathera. Dhok (Haryanvi: धोक worship) comes from the word दहक, which means the sacred fire. Bhaiyan (Haryanvi: भईयाँ) from भूमिया means from the earth. Jathera means the elder or ancestor. A modern temple has been built on top of the earlier temple and medieval sculptures have been preserved in the temple complex. People of several nearby village, including Kanwari, Sultanpur, Muzadpur, Nalwa, Umra, Ratera, and few other villages also consider Bua Kanwari as their kuldevi, ie. ancestral tutelary deity.

The village was established by the Garhwal Kingdom ancestors with likely connections with tomar kingdom of Garhwal Kingdom. The foundation temple put by Garhwal kingdom was name Dada kheda is of Garhwal Gotra. Kanwari also has an old Baba Shri Giri Shiva temple with a monastic akhara for the sadhus (Hindu mystics).

A Gurjara‐Pratihara period 13x10x8.5 cm buff-colored statute of standing Jina in kayotsarga yoga pose in a pillared niche, with makaramukha on its right side, was found. This is a fragment of a big sculpture, which was likely destroyed by islamic invaders.

After Independence of India in 1947, Kanwari became part of Punjab. Once Haryana was formed as a separate state in 1966, Kanwari became part of the Hisar district.

== Demographics ==
As per June 2025 by-election for the sarpanch, Kanwari had 4,116 voters.

As per 2011 census of India, Kanwari had 1,147 households with a population of 5,733 (12% increment since last census), including 1,196 Scheduled Caste inhabitants.

As per 2001 census of India, Kanwari had 896 households with a population of 5,119, including 2,712 males, 2,407 females, and 835 children below the age of 6. The number of literate were 2,655, including 1,739 male and 916 female. The working population was 2,581.

== Transportation ==
=== Road ===
Kanwari is well-connected by the Matelled Asphalt (paved bitumen) road; five different roads converge at Kanwari. Places in clock-wise direction from Kanwari are: To North is Hisar (city) 24 km on Hisar-Tosham-Bhiwani MDR 108 (Major District Road 108). To North-East is Hansi 43 km via Umra link road number 1409. To East is Muzadpur 2 km via link road. To South are Balawas 2 km and Nalwa 4 km; further South-West continuing on the same Hisar-Tosham-Bhiwani MDR 108 (Major District Road 108) are Tosham 16 km and Bhiwani 40 km. To West is Badya Jattan 4 km via a link road, that also leads to Hisar via Mangali 15 km and Kaimri 22 km.

=== Train connectivity ===
Kanwari does not have a rail station. Nearest major train stations accessible by road are 24 km (15 mi) at Hisar, 24 km (15 mi) at Hansi and 45 km at Bhiwani city.

=== Airport connectivity ===
Hisar Airport, the nearest functional airport and flying training club is 24 km (15 mi) away. Currently, there are no commercial domestic or international flights from this airport. Nearest domestic and international airports are 200 km (120 mi) at Indira Gandhi International Airport at Delhi and 260 km (160 mi) Chandigarh International Airport.

== Administration ==
=== Geographical and electoral administration ===
Kanwari is under Hansi land and revenue Tehsil, Hisar-1 Rural Development Block, Hansi Assembly constituency and Hisar Lok Sabha constituency of the Hisar District of Hisar Division in the Haryana state of India.

=== Panchayat and local governance ===
Kanwari is an administrative unit and has a democratically elected panchayat samiti (village council). Kanwari is under Hisar Zilla Panchayat parisad and Hisar block panchayat smiti, and has its own unreserved Gram Panchayat under Gram Panchayat code 25444 and census village code 00412900. Mr. Bhoop Singh s/o Ganeshi Ram of was elected as Sarpanch during the Gram panchayat elections held in February 2016.

Haryana Government has appointed Mr. Pravesh s/o Dharam Vir to run Customer Service Center (CSC) to deliver e-Seva government e-services including G2C Services such as Birth certificate, death certificate, Nakal of Jamabandi, Caste certificate, etc. and B2C Services such as payment of mobile phone bills and top-ups, PAN card, Voter card for delivery through the CSCs.

Water for drinking and irrigation is sourced from Himalaya via Sunder Branch of Hansi-Butana branch of Western Yamuna Canal of Yamuna river. Electricity is distributed by the Dakshin Haryana Bijli Vitran Nigam.

== Village divisions ==
The village is subdivided into various 'Panna' or subsectors, such as 'Parla Panna' (the upper sub-sector) or Sheoran Panna (the sub-sector of the Sheoran gotra) (clan) of the Hindu Jat, 'Nichla Panna' or Garhwal Panna (the sub sector of Garhwal) where majority of the residents are Hindu Jat people of Duhan gotra and 'Bahrla Panna' (the outer subsector), each having their own community center called paras or chaupal.

=== Revenue, Agriculture, Health and Other Services ===
There is a Patwari (Government Land Records Officer), an Agriculture Development Officer (ADO), a Rural Health Officer (RHO), and an Anganwadi (Community Childcare) worker based at Kanwari.

There is Kanwari Yuva Mandal (Kanwari Youth club) established in 1990 by the youths of the village to spread the social awareness among the villagers about the importance of education, their rights and creation of attitude for a positive change. It received an award for the Best Yuva Mandal in the Hissar district.

=== Jan Sahayak e-Governance Services ===
Government of Haryana services are accessible via their Official website.

Government of India e-governance services can be availed online at their website for various govt departments including land & revenue (land rights and ownership records), transport (driving license and vehicle registration), health (birth and death certificates), public health (water and sewage connection), food (ration cards), Power (electricity connection) and HUDA or Municipal Committee/council (house tax and building plans), etc.

== Education ==
Kanwari has a two government schools, a private government approved teachers training college and few more private schools.

- Government Girl's High school (former co-ed Govt school)
- Government Senior Secondary Government school for Boys
- There are 2 private schools in the village, e.g. J.D. Senior Secondary School.
- RDS College of Education that imparts Bachelor of Education (B.Ed) degrees
- There is a Government Degree college at Nalwa (6 km or 4mile from Kanwari)
- There are many more schools institutes and 3 universities at Hisar (city) (24 km or 17 miles from Kanwari).

== Climate ==
Kanwari is a semi-arid region and agriculture is supported mainly by canals and ground water irrigation. Kanwari lies 2 kilometres (1.2 mi) away from the northeast edge (bagar tract) of the Thar Desert. Hot winds, locally known as 'Loo', are strong and frequent from May to July. Intermittent dust storms are common. In the winter some rain is received due to western disturbances.

The Sunder Branch of Western Yamuna Canal (originating from Yamuna river) passes through the agricultural fields of Kanwari on the eastern side between Kanwari and Muzadpur villages, and goes towards Balawas village.

Kanwari has a continental climate, with very hot summers and relatively cool winters. Summer starts in April and lasts till the middle of October. May is the hottest month, with the maximum day temperatures in the 48 °C (118 °F) range. Hisar experiences a weak monsoon, from late June to September, with about 15 inches (380 mm) of rain. Winter starts in November and is mild and sunny, although temperatures may reach freezing on some nights.

Climate data for Hisar (1991–2020 normals, extremes 1914–2020)
Month	Jan	Feb	Mar	Apr	May	Jun	Jul	Aug	Sep	Oct	Nov	Dec	Year
Record high °C (°F)	31.0 (87.8)	35.3 (95.5)	45.6 (114.1)	47.9 (118.2)	48.8 (119.8)	48.4 (119.1)	47.2 (117.0)	44.3 (111.7)	42.2 (108.0)	41.7 (107.1)	36.7 (98.1)	33.6 (92.5)	48.8 (119.8)
Mean daily maximum °C (°F)	19.6 (67.3)	24.2 (75.6)	30.1 (86.2)	37.5 (99.5)	41.4 (106.5)	40.8 (105.4)	37.3 (99.1)	35.9 (96.6)	35.8 (96.4)	34.4 (93.9)	28.9 (84.0)	22.7 (72.9)	32.3 (90.1)
Daily mean °C (°F)	13.3 (55.9)	17.2 (63.0)	22.9 (73.2)	29.2 (84.6)	33.7 (92.7)	34.0 (93.2)	32.3 (90.1)	31.2 (88.2)	30.1 (86.2)	26.6 (79.9)	20.5 (68.9)	15.2 (59.4)	25.5 (77.9)
Mean daily minimum °C (°F)	6.7 (44.1)	9.8 (49.6)	14.8 (58.6)	20.6 (69.1)	25.3 (77.5)	27.6 (81.7)	27.5 (81.5)	26.8 (80.2)	24.6 (76.3)	19.1 (66.4)	12.8 (55.0)	7.7 (45.9)	18.5 (65.3)
Record low °C (°F)	−3.9 (25.0)	−2.2 (28.0)	2.8 (37.0)	6.6 (43.9)	13.5 (56.3)	17.8 (64.0)	20.1 (68.2)	20.0 (68.0)	14.0 (57.2)	8.3 (46.9)	2.5 (36.5)	−1.5 (29.3)	−3.9 (25.0)
Average rainfall mm (inches)	12.7 (0.50)	17.4 (0.69)	18.2 (0.72)	11.4 (0.45)	31.2 (1.23)	70.8 (2.79)	123.1 (4.85)	118.4 (4.66)	76.5 (3.01)	7.2 (0.28)	2.6 (0.10)	4.4 (0.17)	494.0 (19.45)
Average rainy days	1.3	1.5	1.6	1.3	2.3	4.1	6.2	5.9	3.3	0.7	0.3	0.5	28.8
Average relative humidity (%) (at 17:30 IST)	60	51	41	25	25	38	58	62	56	44	49	58	47
Source 1: India Meteorological Department
Source 2: Tokyo Climate Center (mean temperatures 1991–2020)

Main ecological issues are desertification, deforestation, encroachment and land grabbing of common Panchayat forest and grazing land called "bani".

== Fauna ==
Animals and bird of various species are found including sparrow, large Indian parakeet, parrot, crow, rat, rabbit, nilgai (state animal of Haryana), pied crested cuckoo, koel, pheasant, kingfisher, bulbul and Indian magpie robin.

The national bird of India, the common peafowl (mor) is quite common and is seen in the fields and common village land.

=== Reptiles ===
Snakes: The poisonous snakes like common krait, Russel’s viper, phoorsa and other snakes like blind snake, John’s sand boa, wolf snake, rat snake and sand snake are found around the village.

=== Lizards ===
The common lizards can be seen in the houses. Kirla or girgit is found in the hedges and attracts the attention by changing its colours. Sanda is found in sandy areas.

=== Amphibians ===
Two species of tortoises found are black pond turtle and three-striped pond turtle in around village and the common frogs found in the village are Indian bull frog, Indian cricket frog, Indian burrowing frog and common toad.

In May 2007, Kanwari villagers stopped a transport truck full of cattle, rescued the cattle (which were on their way to the slaughterhouse), and set the truck on fire. The slaughter of cows is not permitted in the Hindu religion, as the cow is sacred and worshiped by the Hindus as mother (giver of life-nurturing milk).

== See also ==
- Bidhwan
- Badya Jattan
- Badyan Brahmnan
- Balawas
- Barwas
- Pabra
- Norangpura
