= Yamini Dalal =

Indian-American biochemist

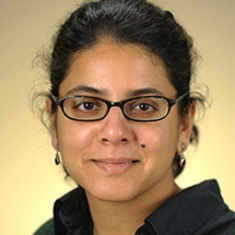
- Education: St. Xavier's College, Mumbai (BSc); Purdue University (PhD)
- Scientific career
- Fields: Biochemistry
- Workplaces: National Cancer Institute
- Doctoral advisor: Arnold Stein

Yamini Dalal is an Indian-American biochemist specialized in chromatin structure and epigenetic mechanisms. She is a senior investigator at the National Cancer Institute.

== Education ==
Yamini Dalal became interested in chromosome structure and epigenetic gene regulation during her Baccalaureate years at St. Xavier's College, Mumbai where she earned a B.Sc. with a double major in Biochemistry and Life Sciences in 1995. She moved to the United States for her post-graduate work. In Arnold Stein's laboratory at Purdue University, she used classical chromatin biochemistry tools to understand how DNA sequence motifs and linker histones can shape the chromatin structure in silico, in vitro, and in vivo. During this time, she discovered that the regions of the mouse genome contained alternating tracts of stiff and flexible DNA, which allowed in silico prediction of nucleosome positions. These positions could be recapitulated in vitro using just purified histones and DNA, and detected in vivo, at developmentally regulated genes in mice. She also studied how linker histone H1 could influence nucleosome positioning and chromatin folding in vitro and in vivo. For these studies, she received her Ph.D. from Purdue University in 2003.

Histone variants were the next logical step in teasing out how intrinsic variability in the chromatin fiber can encode a diversity of biological functions. To study this aspect of chromatin structure, Dalal moved to Seattle to work with Steven Henikoff at the Fred Hutchinson Cancer Research Center as a postdoctoral research associate from 2003–2007. Using a range of biochemical analyses, she and colleagues uncovered that the Drosophila centromere-specific histone variant makes non-canonical nucleosomes, features of which are reminiscent of the ancestral nucleosomes seen in the archaebacteria.

== Career and research ==
Dalal joined National Institutes of Health in September 2008. She is a senior investigator in the laboratory of receptor biology and gene expression at the National Cancer Institute. She is director of the chromatin structure and epigenetic mechanisms group. She was awarded tenure at NIH in 2018.

Dalal's lab has shown that some of these unusual features are conserved in human cells, that centromeric nucleosomes oscillate in structure and in modifications over the cell cycle. Such oscillations are perturbed in human cancers wherein CENP-A is innately mis-regulated and occupies ectopic regions of the human genome linked to instability. Her lab has also worked on dissecting the function of transcription of repetitive loci within human centromeres. We are now expanding our studies to other histone variants in human tumors, and using interdisciplinary approaches to disrupt cancer-specific chromatin interactions.
