= Naresh Dalal =

American chemist

Naresh Dalal is a physical chemist who specializes in materials science. He is the Dirac Professor of Chemistry and Biochemistry at Florida State University, where he is affiliated with the National High Magnetic Field Laboratory.

== Research ==
Dalal's research group focuses on:

- Studying the physical properties of solid-state materials
- Development of new materials (superconductors, highly correlated electron spin systems, molecular magnets, ferroics, etc.)
- Understanding structure-property relationships
- Obtaining guidelines for developing new materials
- Development of novel applications or improvement of existing instrumental methods (high field EPR probe design, NMR methods, etc.)

== Honors ==
Fellow of the Royal Society of Chemists in 2017.

Received Florida State University's highest faculty honor when he was named 2012-2013 Robert O. Lawton Distinguished Professor.

Silver medal for Physics/Materials Science from the International Electron Paramagnetic Resonance Society.

Florida Chemistry award from the Florida Section of the American Chemical Society in 2007, and the Southern Chemist Award from the Memphis Section of the American Chemical Society.

Dalal was named a fellow by the American Physical Society in 2000. He was named a fellow by the American Chemical Society in 2010.
