= Deona =

Coordinates: 32°38′0″N 74°0′0″E

Deona Mandi دیونہ منڈی
- Mandi and union council
- Interactive map of Deona Mandi
- Country: Pakistan
- Region: Punjab province
- District: Gujrat District
- Elevation: 231 m (758 ft)
- Time zone: UTC+5 (PST)
- Area code: 533

Deona Mandi is a town and union council of Gujrat District, in the Punjab province of Pakistan. It is located at 32°38'0N 74°0'0E with an altitude of 231 metres (761 feet).

== Economy ==
Deona Mandi was historically known for its handloom weavers who produced a type of cloth called Khais. This traditional craft, once a significant aspect of the town's identity and highly regarded by Punjabis globally, has largely disappeared. Consequently, Deona Mandi has undergone a transformation. The town, which previously thrived on its weaving industry, has predominantly become a grain market now. In addition to this change, there has been a move towards manufacturing more contemporary products such as tarpaulins and shelters. These items are now produced to cater to various local needs, including public gatherings, weddings, and funerals.
