= List of zaildars by zail =

The Zaildar was the officer in charge of a Zail, a revenue and administrative unit in the colonial rural administration of Punjab in British India., comprising between two and forty villages.

== List of Zaildars ==
=== Chaudhry Bostan Khan Zaildar ===
Zaildar of Punjab. Chaudhary Bostan Khan Zaildar was appointed as a Zaildar of Punjab based on 84 villages of Rawalpindi & Islamabad Zail. He was the only landlord of that District. He used to listen to the problems of the public in a Diwan on a regular basis in his village Kotha Kalan. Later his son Chaudhary Lal Khan contested in local body elections and became Chairman for four times consecutively and received the title of "Baba-e-Baldiyat" from the Government of Pakistan. He was also the member of the district council.

=== Bidhwan Jaglan Jat Zaildar ===
Bidhwan Jaglan Zail (बिधवान जागलान ज़ैल) was headquartered in the Bidhwan (बिधवान) village and ruled by the Jaglan clan. It covered four villages in Erstwhile Loharu State in the Hisar district. These villages, Bidhwan, Kalali (कलाली), Mandholi Khurd (मंढोली खुर्द) and Siwach, lie in Bhiwani district. The Zail and Zaildar systems were abolished in 1952, and the Jaglan family now continues as Lambardar.
