= Loharu State =

Princely state of India

Coordinates: 28.45°N 75.82°E

Loharu State लोहारू रियासत ریاست لوہارو
- Princely State of British India
- 1803–1947
- Flag

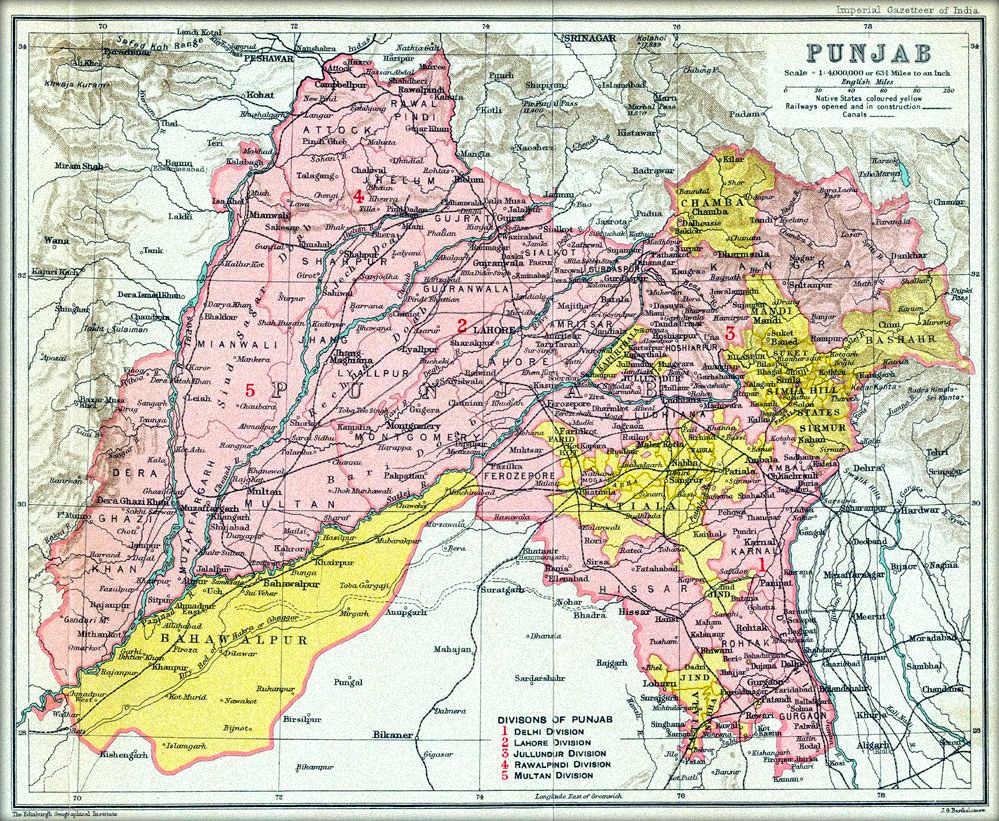
- Loharu at the edge of Punjab (British India), 1903
- Capital: Loharu
- Area
  - 1901: 570 km^{2} (220 sq mi)
- Population
  - 1901: 15,229
- History
  - Established: 1803
  - Accession to the Union of India: 1947
Succeeded by
India
- Today part of: India

Loharu State was one of the princely states of India during the period of the British Raj. It was part of the Punjab States Agency and was a nine-gun salute state.

Loharu State encompassed an area of 222 square miles (570 km^{2}), and was situated in the south-east corner of the undivided Punjab province, between the district of Hissar and the Rajputana Agency. In 1901, the state had a population of 15,229 people, of whom 2,175 resided in the town of Loharu. From 1803 to 1835, the territory of Loharu State also included a Ferozepur Jhirka enclave within the area directly administered by the British Raj, The outer limits of the state were defined by the peripheral towns of Loharu, Bahal, Isharwal, Kairu, Jui Khurd and Badhra.

The haveli of 'Nawab of Loharu', known as Mahal Sara, lies in Gali Qasim Jan in Ballimaran, where his son-in-law, noted poet Mirza Ghalib stayed for a few years, whose own Ghalib ki Haveli lies a few yard away. Now the gali, which houses the Mahal Sara, is known as Kothi Nawab Loharu lane in Ballimaran mohalla of Chandni Chowk area in Old Delhi.

== History ==
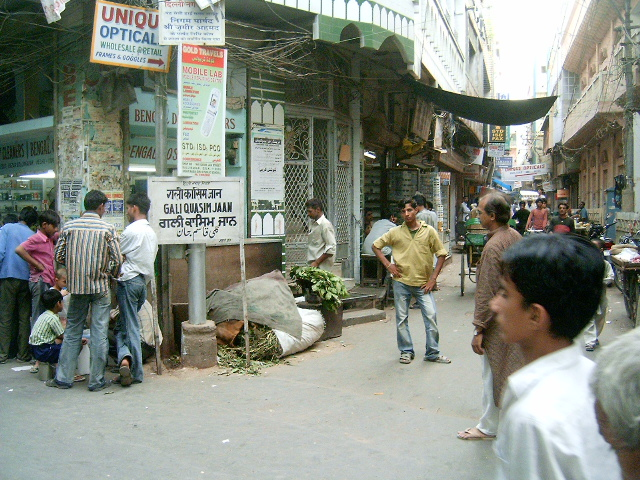
Gali Qasim Jan in Ballimaran

Loharu town, the seat of the state's administration town got its name from the Lohars (local blacksmiths) who were employed in the minting of coins for the erstwhile Jaipur State. The princely state of Loharu was founded by Ahmad Baksh Khan in 1803 when he received the town of Loharu, (along with the pargana of 'Firozepur Jirka' (now in Nuh district), from the Lord Lake of British East India Company as a reward for his services against the Jat rulers of Bharatpur.

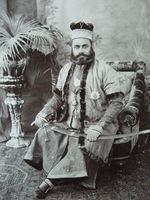
Sir Amiruddin Ahmad Khan, Nawab of Loharu,1884-1920.

Ahmad Baksh Khan was succeeded by his eldest son, Sams-ud-din Khan [Samsudin Ahmad Khan], in 1827; his reign did not last long: in 1835 he was executed by the British Raj for being involved in the conspiracy to kill the British Resident to Delhi, Sir William Frazer, Noted Urdu poet Daagh Dehlvi was a son of Nawab Samsuddin Khan. Subsequently, the pargana of Firozepur was taken away by the British and the state of Loharu was given to his brothers, Amin-ud-din and Zia-ud-din Khan. Both were themselves kept under surveillance after the Indian Rebellion of 1857 for some time, before being released and their positions restored.

Alauddin Ahmed Khan succeeded his father Amin-ud-din Khan in 1869 and received the title of Nawab. Alauddin's son, Amir-ud-din Ahmad Khan (1859–1937), after managing the state on his father's behalf, succeeded him in 1884, though from 1893 to 1903, he remained administrator and adviser of the state of Maler Kotla – during this time, the state was being handled by his younger brother, Bashiruddin Ahmed Khan. In 1903, Amir- ud-din Ahmad Khan also received the K.C.S.I honour from the British Government and after the 1903 Durbar Honours from 1 January 1903 was allowed a 9 gun personal salute. He later became a member of the Viceroy of India's legislative council. The Nawab of Loharu State dealt with the dissenting kisans (farmers) and his troops opened fire on a Kisan Meeting on 8 August 1935, killing dozens of kisans.

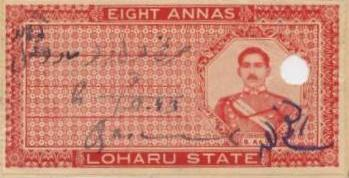
Loharu State, State Court Fee Stamp, 8 Annas, issued under Nawab Amin ud-din Ahmad Khan (r. 1926–1947)

In 1920, he abdicated to his second son, Aizzuddin Ahmad Khan, though he died early in 1926, leaving the state to his son, Amin ud-din Ahmad Khan (1911–1983) - the last Nawab. However, since the new Nawab was still young, Amirud-din Ahmad Khan stepped in and took care of the state till 1931.

After the Independence of India in 1947, the state acceded to the Union of India and many of the ruling family and the city's Muslim inhabitants re-settled in Lahore, Pakistan, though the Nawab and his direct descendants (except for the eldest daughter of Nawab Aminuddin Ahmed, Mahbano Begum who lives in Islamabad), stayed on, in India.

=== Nawabs of Loharu ===
Lineage
Nawab	Reign
Ahmad Bakhsh Khan	1806–1827
Shams-ud-din Khan (Shamsuddin Ahmad Khan)	1827–1835
Aminuddin Ahmad Khan	1835 - 27 February 1869
Allauddin Ahmad Khan	27 February 1869 – 31 October 1884
Amiruddin Ahmad Khan, K.C.S.I	31 October 1884 - April 1920 (abdicated)
Azizuddin Ahmad Khan	April 1920 - 30 October 1926
Aminuddin Ahmad Khan II	30 October 1926 – 15 August 1947

=== Notable members of the Loharu dynasty ===
The ruling family of Loharu was linked by blood or marriage to several important Muslim personalities of the 19th century, including:

- Mirza Ghalib (1796 — 1869), renowned Urdu and Persian poet, married Umrao Begum, daughter of Nawab Ilahi Bakhsh Khan (younger brother of the first Nawab, Ahmad Baksh Khan).
- Daagh Dehlvi (1831 – 1905), a noted Urdu poet was a son of second Nawab, Shamsuddin Ahmad Khan.
- Syed Ahmed Khan (1817 – 1898), educationist KCSI
- Fakhruddin Ali Ahmed (1905–1977), President of India (1974–1977)
- Ibrahim Ali Khan Pataudi (r. 1913–1917), Nawab of Pataudi, married Shahar Bano Begum, daughter of Nawab Amiruddin Ahmad Khan.

=== Courtiers ===
Jaglan Zail of Bidhwan was adjacent to the Loharu State.

Mir Muhammad Khan, was a fine vocalist in the court of Maharaja Loharu, a descendant of Mir Allahbux who a famous vocalists and the court-musician of Raja Nahar Singh of Ballabhgarh State.

=== Post-Independence ===
==== Loharu descendants in India ====
- Amin ud-din Ahmad Khan, the last ruling Nawab: Served in the Indian Army, seeing action during the liberation of Portuguese India in 1961. He was later elected to the Legislative Assembly of Rajasthan state, and ended his chequered career as the governor of Himachal Pradesh (1977–1981) and governor of Punjab (1981–1982).
- Ala-uddin Ahmad Khan II (Born 1938): After staying in Kolkata for many year, he now lives in Loharu town; where the Loharu fort, now in ruins, stands in its center, and a major tourist attraction
- Aimaduddin Ahmad Khan, or 'Durru Mian' (Born 1944) married to Fauzia Ahmad Khan: Indian National Congress politician, member Legislative Assembly of Rajasthan, Health Minister Of Rajasthan state, settled in Jaipur
- Noor Bano (Born 1939): Married to Syed Zulfikar Ali Khan of Rampur (Titular Nawab of Rampur), and a member 11th Lok Sabha and 13th Lok Sabha.

==== Loharu descendants in Pakistan ====
- Jamiluddin Aali, (20 January 1925 – 23 November 2015), Urdu poet, playwright.
- Mahbano Begum, (born 1934, Loharu), eldest daughter of Nawab Aminuddin Ahmad Khan, married to H. E. Dr. S. M. Koreshi, Ambassador of Pakistan.
- Junaid Jamshed, (died 2016, Havelian) niece of last Nawab of Loharu, Pakistani Artist and Personality

=== Adjacent states and jagirs ===
- Jind State, bordering south east
- Patiala State, bordering south
- Jaglan Zail of Bidhwan, bordering north was directly administered by the British raj.

== Demographics ==
Religious groups in Loharu State (British Punjab province era)
Religious group	1881		1891		1901		1911		1921		1931		1941	
Religious group	Pop.	%	Pop.	%	Pop.	%	Pop.	%	Pop.	%	Pop.	%	Pop.	%
Hinduism (Note: 1931-1941: Including Ad-Dharmis)	12,225	88.88%	18,125	90%	13,254	87.03%	16,178	86.99%	17,978	87.18%	20,198	86.55%	23,923	85.77%
Islam	1,517	11.03%	2,014	10%	1,963	12.89%	2,401	12.91%	2,625	12.73%	3,119	13.36%	3,960	14.2%
Jainism	12	0.09%	0	0%	12	0.08%	18	0.1%	18	0.09%	18	0.08%	0	0%
Sikhism	0	0%	0	0%	0	0%	0	0%	0	0%	2	0.01%	7	0.03%
Christianity	0	0%	0	0%	0	0%	0	0%	0	0%	1	0%	2	0.01%
Zoroastrianism	0	0%	0	0%	0	0%	0	0%	0	0%	0	0%	0	0%
Buddhism	0	0%	0	0%	0	0%	0	0%	0	0%	0	0%	0	0%
Judaism	—N/a	—N/a	0	0%	0	0%	0	0%	0	0%	0	0%	0	0%
Others	0	0%	0	0%	0	0%	0	0%	0	0%	0	0%	0	0%
Total population	13,754	100%	20,139	100%	15,229	100%	18,597	100%	20,621	100%	23,338	100%	27,892	100%
Note: British Punjab province era district borders are not an exact match in the present-day due to various bifurcations to district borders — which since created new districts — throughout the historic Punjab Province region during the post-independence era that have taken into account population increases.

== See also ==
- History of Haryana
- List of princely states of British India
