= Naurangabad =

Coordinates: 28.803°N 76.231°E

Naurangabad is a village and location of the Indus Valley Civilisation archaeological site in Bhiwani district of Haryana state in India.
