= Zail (British India) =

Zails were a revenue and administrative unit, extending between two to hundred villages, under an officer in charge Zaildar in the colonial, rural administration of Punjab in British India. The system was abolished in 1952.

== Demarcation of Zail ==
Each Tehsil was subdivided in to several Zails. A Zail was a grouping of villages. Tehsils, zails and villages were headed by the tehsildar, zaildar, muqaddam,lambardar, or numberdars. Muqaddam was usually a prominent chowdhury who was appointed as numbardar of the village, villages with large revenue land had more than one numberdar. Zail were established and demarcated by the District collector during the land revenue settlement exercise. A settlement officer, with advice from the District collector and by the final approval of the state's Financial Commissioner, appointed a Zaildar to each Zail, who were equivalent to the Chaudharis (feudal zamindars) of earlier times and were hand-picked by the deputy-commissioner, who based his decision on issues such as caste or tribe, local influence, extent of landholding, services rendered to the state by him or his family, and personal character and ability.

"The introduction of the zaildari agency into any district must be approved by the local Government [Deputy Commissioner]. Any subsequent increase or decrease in the number of zaildars can be made under the orders of the Financial Commissioner, provided the percentage of the land revenue assigned for their emoluments is not exceeded. If the appointment of zaildars has not already been considered and negatived, a Settlement Officer, as soon as he feels that he has a sufficient acquaintance with the circumstances of his district, should draw up a preliminary report on the whole subject. In it he should explain why no such agency has yet been appointed, and submit rough proposals for its organization. No attempt should be made to fix the limits of zails, but the tribal organization and other important families of the tract should be explained in such detail as is necessary to enable Government to judge whether the agency should be introduced. Any proposals to appoint inamdars [also called safedposh] may be made in the same report. The opinions both of the Settlement Officer and of the Deputy Commissioner should be given. The report should be submitted to Government through the Commissioner and the Financial Commissioner, each of whom should record his views on the proposal made in it."

— Punjab Settlement Manual, 1930 (point 578, page 272).

== Revenue ==
Zaildar collected the revenue from the cluster of villages under him and passed it to the British Raj district collectors, Zaildars were remunerated for their duties with life grants of either fixed amount or grant equal to one per cent of the revenue of their zails from the assessment of any single village that they chose.

== Impact and Legacy of Zaildari System ==
Zails and Zaildari system extended the influence of the colonial state right into the villages.

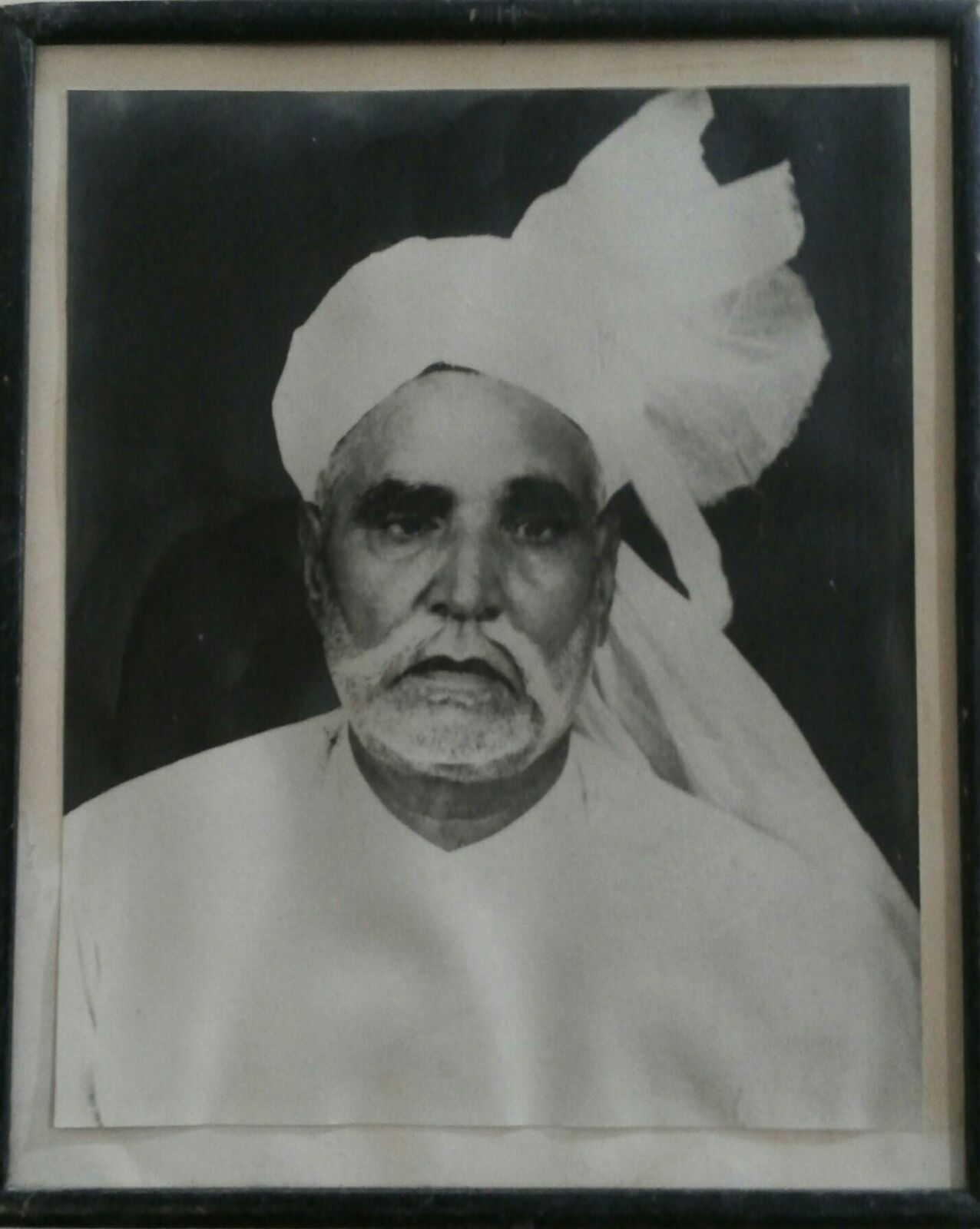
Mr. Zaildar Pir Muhammad Yar Chishti (District Bahawalnagar - Punjab (Southern Region) Pakistan).

== Abolition ==
Post Indian independence in 1947, the system of Zails, Zaildars and Safedposh continued to exist till 1948 but were finally abolished in 1952 by the Government of India.

== See also ==
- List of Zaildars by Zail
- Indian feudalism
- Indian honorifics
- Gram panchayat
- Jagirdar
- Mankari
- Lambardar
- Sarpanch
- Zaildar
- Zamindar
- Jat
