= Bahal, Bhiwani =

Town in Bhiwani district, Haryana

Bahal Behal
- Town
- Location within Haryana Location within India
- Coordinates: 28°37′47″N 75°37′04″E
- Country: India
- State: Haryana
- District: Bhiwani
- Tehsil: Loharu
- Elevation: 225 m (738 ft)

Population (2011)
  - Total: 196,057
  - Density: 380/km^{2} (980/sq mi)

Languages
  - Official: [[Hindi][Haryanvi]]
- Time zone: UTC+5:30 (IST)
- PIN: 127028
- Telephone code: 91-1255
- ISO 3166 code: IN-HR
- Vehicle registration: HR-18; HR-61
- Website: Official Website

Bahal, also known as Behal, is a small town in the Loharu tehsil in the Bhiwani district of the Indian state of Haryana. Situated near the town of Rajgarh on the Haryana-Rajasthan border, it lies 54 kilometres (34 mi) south west of the district capital Bhiwani and 160 kilometres (99 mi) south west of the national capital New Delhi and Rajiv Gandhi Stadium is also situated in Bahal.

== Places of interest ==
There are many temples in the town including Khatu Shyam, Shree Ram Mandir, Devi Mandir, Alakh Baba, Balaji Mandir and Krishna Mandir.

Bahal has a police station on Rajgarh Road which also serves nearby villages. Bahal also has a cereal market where farmers from in and around Bahal sell their agricultural products.

There are four banks in Bahal:-

- Punjab National Bank
- State Bank of India
- Indian Bank
- Sarva Haryana Gramin Bank
- HDFC Bank

There is a nearby village called Modasiya, Paju.

== Transportation ==
Nearest railway stations:-

- Rampura Beri (10 kilometres (6.2 mi))
- Rajgarh/Sadulpur (Rajasthan) (25 kilometres (16 mi))
- Loharu (45 kilometres (28 mi))
- Bhiwani (56 kilometres (35 mi))

Nearest airports:- Hisar (Maharaja Agrasen International Airport)

- New Delhi (Indira Gandhi International Airport)
- Jaipur (Jaipur International Airport)

== Education ==
There are many schools in Bahal including BRCM Public School (Gyankunj), BRCM Public School (Vidhyagram), Shriram international school, Govt Sr. Sec. School, and Shree Shyam Sr. Sec. School. There are some well known colleges in the town too, such as BRCM CET (Engineering College) and GDC Memorial College (Degree College), Government Girls College, ITI and BRCM Law College.
