= Badya Jattan =

- Village
- Location in Haryana, India Badya Jattan (India)
- Coordinates: 28.9725°N 75.7396°E
- Country: India
- State: Haryana
- District: Hisar

Government
  - Type: Local government
  - Body: Panchayat
- Elevation: 215 m (705 ft)

Languages
  - Official: Hindi
- Time zone: UTC+5:30 (IST)
- PIN: 125037
- Vehicle registration: HR
- Website: haryana.gov.in

Badya Jattan, next to Badyan Brahmnan, is a village of less than 7,000 population, in Hisar-1 Rural Development Block, Nalwa Chaudhry (Vidhan Sabha constituency) and Hisar (Lok Sabha constituency) of Hisar District of Hisar Division in the Haryana state of India.

It is situated 166 kilometres (103 mi) from the national capital Delhi and 24 kilometres (15 mi) from the district headquarters Hisar on the Hisar-Tosham road.

== History ==
After Independence of India in 1947, it became part of Punjab. Once Haryana was formed as a separate state in 1966, it became part of the Hisar district, state of Haryana State.

Village has an old temple called Dadi Gauri dhok (Haryanvi: धोक, meaning worship), bhaiyan (Haryanvi: भईयाँ, from भूमिया or of land), or jathera (Punjabi: जठेरा, from जेष्ठ which means elder) village ancestor deity which is the abode of village deity where newlyweds go for blessings before entering the village.

== Jat gotras ==
The following Jaat gotras are found in the village.

- Dalal

== Transportation ==
=== Road ===
It is well-connected by the Matelled Asphalt (paved bitumen) road with Hisar (city) 24 km.

=== Train connectivity ===
Village does not have a rail station. Nearest major train stations accessible by road are 24 km (15 mi) at Hisar, 24 km (15 mi) at Hansi and 45 km at Bhiwani city.

=== Airport connectivity ===
Hisar Airport, the nearest functional airport and flying training club, is 24 km (15 mi) away. There are currently no commercial domestic or international flights from this airport. The nearest domestic and international airports are 200 km (120 mi) away at Indira Gandhi International Airport in Delhi and 260 km (160 mi) away at Chandigarh International Airport.

== Revenue, Agriculture, Health and Other Services ==
There is a Patwari (Government Land Records Officer), an Agriculture Development Officer (ADO), a Rural Health Officer (RHO), and an Anganwadi (Community Childcare) worker based at village.

== Jan Sahayak e-Governance Services ==
Government of Haryana services are accessible via their Official website.

Government of India e-governance services can be availed online at their website for various govt departments including land & revenue (land rights and ownership records), transport (driving license and vehicle registration), health (birth and death certificates), public health (water and sewage connection), food (ration cards), Power (electricity connection) and HUDA or Municipal Committee/council (house tax and building plans), etc.

== See also ==
- Bidhwan
- Badyan Brahmnan
- Kanwari
