= Siwani =

- Town
- Location in Haryana, India Location in India
- Coordinates: 28.9167°N 75.6167°E
- Country: India
- State: Haryana
- District: Bhiwani

Area
  - Total: 4.88 km^{2} (1.88 sq mi)

Population (2011)
  - Total: 19,143
  - Density: 3,920/km^{2} (10,200/sq mi)

Languages
  - Official: Hindi · English
  - Regional: Haryanvi, Bagri
- Time zone: UTC+5:30 (IST)
- Postal codes: 127046, 127045
- Vehicle registration: HR-17
- Nearest City: Hisar, Bhiwani
- Sex ratio: 887 ♂/♀
- Literacy: 64%
- Website: ulbharyana.gov.in/Siwani/

Siwani is a town and a municipality located approx. 58 km from Bhiwani city in Bhiwani district in the north Indian state of Haryana. It is the administrative headquarters of Siwani tehsil.

== Demographics ==
As of 2011 Census of India, Siwani had a population of 19,143. Males constitute 53% of the population and females 47%. Siwani has an average literacy rate of 64%, lower than the national average of 74.04%; male literacy is 71%, and female literacy is 55%. 14% of the population is under 6 years of age.

== Civic Administration ==
Siwani is the headquarters of the Siwani Subdivision and Tehsil of Bhiwani district. Siwani became a municipality on 18 October 2001, when Siwani Municipal Committee came into existence. Siwani Municipal Committee has 16 wards and is headed by a Chairman. Latest general elections for Siwani Municipal Committee along with other committees and councils were declared on 4 February 2025 by State Election Commission, Haryana. Polls were held on 2 March 2025 and results were declared on 12 March 2025. Siwani had the highest voter turnout in the state at 85.9%.

Siwani has a police station of Haryana Police to maintain law and order in Siwani and adjoining area including Jhumpa and Barwa. Siwani is also the seat of DSP Siwani. Siwani court has a Civil Judge Senior Division and a Chief Judicial Magistrate at the Taluka Court.

Siwani is part of Loharu Assembly Constituency and is represented through it in the Haryana Vidhan Sabha. Similarly for Lok Sabha, Siwani is a part of Bhiwani–Mahendragarh Lok Sabha constituency and represented through it in the lower house of the Parliament of India.

== Economy ==
Siwani Mandi is known in the Bhiwani district for its agricultural market. There are many Guar Gum factories and dall mill in Siwani.

== Transport ==
=== Road ===
Siwani lies on the National Highway 52 which connects it to Hisar and Jaipur. Siwani is well connected with the national capital New Delhi through National Highway 9 via Hisar and all other major cities through the National Highways of India. It also lies on State Highway 19 and MDR 109.

Bus is a major transport medium and services are provided by Haryana Roadways, RSRTC and other private operators. Siwani has a government bus stand. Generally long route buses halts at Siwani. Local buses provides connectivity with Hisar and Rajgarh.

=== Rail ===
Siwani has a railway station (SWNI) and lies in the Bikaner Division of North Western Railway zone of Indian Railways. There are multiple trains that halt at Siwani Railway Station including few long route trains. The nearest junctions are Hisar Junction and Sadulpur Junction.

== Education ==
=== Primary Education ===
There are 4 Government Primary Schools (GPS) in Siwani and 3 of them are associated with Haryana Government's Learning Enhancement Programme (LEP) initiative. 1 of the 4 schools is a girls-only (GGPS) school and rest are co-ed. Other than the government schools, there are multiple private schools who also provide primary education.

=== Senior School Education ===
There are 2 Government Senior Secondary Schools (GSSS) and are run by Haryana Government's Department of School Education. One of the schools is a girls-only school. Also, there are multiple private schools that provide senior secondary education.

=== Higher Education ===
SMRJ Government College is the main higher education institution that serves Siwani. It was established in 1998 and is permanently affiliated with Ch. Bansi Lal University, Bhiwani. It has been recognized by UGC under section 2(f) of UGC Act, 1956. As per the data submitted to NIRF for 2025 rankings, it has 580 seats for 3-Year UG programs and 180 seats for 2-Year PG programs.

== Notable people ==
- Arvind Kejriwal, Former Chief Minister of Delhi
