= Loharu Assembly constituency =

Constituency of the Haryana legislative assembly in India

Coordinates: 28.43°N 75.81°E

- Constituency No. 54 for the Haryana Legislative Assembly

Constituency details
- Country: India
- Region: North India
- State: Haryana
- District: Bhiwani
- Lok Sabha constituency: Bhiwani–Mahendragarh
- Established: 1967
- Total electors: 2,01,143
- Reservation: None

Member of Legislative Assembly
- 15th Haryana Legislative Assembly
- Incumbent Rajbir Fartia
- Party: INC
- Elected year: 2024

Loharu Assembly constituency is one of the 90 Vidhan Sabha constituencies in Haryana state in northern India.

== Overview ==
Loharu (constituency number 54) is one of the 6 Assembly constituencies located in Bhiwani district. This constituency covers the entire Loharu and Siwani tehsils.

Loharu is part of Bhiwani-Mahendragarh Lok Sabha constituency along with eight other Assembly segments, namely, Dadri, Badhra, Tosham and Bhiwani in this district and Ateli, Mahendragarh, Narnaul and Nangal Chaudhry in Mahendragarh district.

== Members of the Legislative Assembly ==
Year	Member	Party
1967	Ch. Hiranand Sheoran	Indian National Congress
1968	Chandrawati Sheoran	Indian National Congress
1972	Chandrawati Sheoran	Indian National Congress
1977	Ch. Hiranand Sheoran	Janata Party
1982	Ch. Hiranand Sheoran	Lokdal
1987	Ch. Hiranand Sheoran	Lokdal
1991	Chandrawati Sheoran	Janata Dal
1996	Somvir Singh Sheoran	Haryana Vikas Party
2000	Bahadur Singh Sheoran	Indian National Lok Dal
2005	Somvir Singh Sheoran	Indian National Congress
2009	Dharam Pal Obra	Indian National Lok Dal
2014	Om Parkash Barwa	Indian National Lok Dal
2019	Jai Parkash Dalal	Bharatiya Janata Party
2024	Rajbir Singh Fartia	Indian National Congress

== Election results ==
=== Assembly Election 2024 ===
2024 Haryana Legislative Assembly election: Loharu
Party	Candidate	Votes	%	±%
INC	Rajbir Fartia	81,336	48.96%	▲17.63
BJP	Jai Parkash Dalal	80,544	48.49%	▲4.47
INLD	Bhoop Singh Sheoran	1,191	0.72%	▼0.56
NOTA	None of the Above	259	0.16%	▼0.30
Margin of victory		792	0.48%	▼12.20
Turnout		1,66,115	80.38%	▲8.11
Registered electors		2,01,143		▲7.13
INC gain from BJP		Swing	▲4.95	

=== Assembly Election 2019 ===
2019 Haryana Legislative Assembly election: Loharu
Party	Candidate	Votes	%	±%
BJP	Jai Parkash Dalal	61,365	44.02%	▲16.04
INC	Somvir Singh	43,688	31.34%	▲8.12
JJP	Alka Arya	27,515	19.74%	New
BSP	Ramesh	1,812	1.30%	▲0.72
INLD	Raj Singh Gagarwas	1,782	1.28%	▼28.22
LSP	Raj Kumar	771	0.55%	New
Margin of victory		17,677	12.68%	▲11.16
Turnout		139,414	72.27%	▼9.13
Registered electors		192,903		▲13.82
BJP gain from INLD		Swing	▲14.52	

=== Assembly Election 2014 ===
2014 Haryana Legislative Assembly election: Loharu
Party	Candidate	Votes	%	±%
INLD	Om Parkash Barwa	40,693	29.50%	▲2.36
BJP	Jai Parkash Dalal	38,598	27.98%	▲27.2
INC	Somvir Singh	32,026	23.21%	▲1.8
HJC(BL)	Bahadur Singh	19,599	14.21%	▲9.21
Republican Backward Congress	Rajender Singh	3,041	2.20%	New
BSP	Sumitra Devi	797	0.58%	▼4.63
Margin of victory		2,095	1.52%	▲0.97
Turnout		137,964	81.40%	▲2.17
Registered electors		169,487		▲17.95
INLD hold		Swing	▲2.36	

=== Assembly Election 2009 ===
2009 Haryana Legislative Assembly election: Loharu
Party	Candidate	Votes	%	±%
INLD	Dharam Pal	30,887	27.13%	▼1.08
Independent	Jai Parkash Dalal	30,264	26.58%	New
INC	Somvir Singh S/O Ganpat Ram	24,380	21.42%	▼17.37
Independent	Rattanpal	6,710	5.89%	New
BSP	Ravi	5,930	5.21%	▲3.72
HJC(BL)	Madan Lal	5,693	5.00%	New
Independent	Pilot Sandeep Arya	4,416	3.88%	New
CPI(M)	Dayanand Poonia	1,566	1.38%	New
BJP	Dharamveer	884	0.78%	▼6.53
Margin of victory		623	0.55%	▼10.02
Turnout		1,13,845	79.23%	▲2.05
Registered electors		1,43,693		▼2.56
INLD gain from INC		Swing	▼11.65	

=== Assembly Election 2005 ===
2005 Haryana Legislative Assembly election: Loharu
Party	Candidate	Votes	%	±%
INC	Somvir Singh	44,140	38.78%	▲33.68
INLD	Bahadur Singh	32,108	28.21%	▼18.39
Independent	Rattan Pal	24,248	21.30%	New
BJP	Vijay Shekhawat	8,316	7.31%	New
BSP	Nanar Ram	1,700	1.49%	▼0.11
Independent	Parmod Kumar	939	0.83%	New
Independent	Sushil Kumar	629	0.55%	New
Margin of victory		12,032	10.57%	▲4.16
Turnout		1,13,817	77.18%	▲7.04
Registered electors		1,47,474		▲16.32
INC gain from INLD		Swing	▼7.82	

=== Assembly Election 2000 ===
2000 Haryana Legislative Assembly election: Loharu
Party	Candidate	Votes	%	±%
INLD	Bahadur Singh	41,439	46.60%	New
HVP	Somvir Singh	35,740	40.19%	▼17.67
INC	Ram Chander	4,539	5.10%	▲1.01
Independent	Rameshwar	3,721	4.18%	New
BSP	Surat Singh	1,422	1.60%	New
Independent	Sadhu Ram	899	1.01%	New
Margin of victory		5,699	6.41%	▼37.92
Turnout		88,917	70.71%	▲4.42
Registered electors		1,26,780		▲1.36
INLD gain from HVP		Swing	▼11.26	

=== Assembly Election 1996 ===
1996 Haryana Legislative Assembly election: Loharu
Party	Candidate	Votes	%	±%
HVP	Somvir Singh	47,559	57.86%	New
SAP	Hira Nand	11,126	13.54%	New
Independent	Ramesh	7,822	9.52%	New
Independent	Raj Singh	3,857	4.69%	New
INC	Chandrawati	3,364	4.09%	▼12.85
Independent	Brahma Nand	3,329	4.05%	New
JD	Ram Kumar S/O Sheo Nand	1,331	1.62%	▼37.81
Independent	Devi Lal	889	1.08%	New
Margin of victory		36,433	44.33%	▲23.76
Turnout		82,193	67.72%	▲10.54
Registered electors		1,25,076		▲13.62
HVP gain from JD		Swing	▲18.43	

=== Assembly Election 1991 ===
1991 Haryana Legislative Assembly election: Loharu
Party	Candidate	Votes	%	±%
JD	Chandrawati	23,953	39.43%	New
JP	Sohanlal	11,462	18.87%	New
INC	Sumitra	10,289	16.94%	▼20.96
BJP	Vijay Shekhawat	3,878	6.38%	New
Independent	Raj Singh	3,636	5.99%	New
Independent	Hari Singh	2,928	4.82%	New
Independent	Nihal Singh	1,347	2.22%	New
Independent	Rajender Singh	911	1.50%	New
Independent	Girdhari Lal	653	1.08%	New
Margin of victory		12,491	20.56%	▲1.81
Turnout		60,742	57.96%	▼10.46
Registered electors		1,10,082		▲7.44
JD gain from LKD		Swing	▼17.22	

=== Assembly Election 1987 ===
1987 Haryana Legislative Assembly election: Loharu
Party	Candidate	Votes	%	±%
LKD	Hira Nand	38,104	56.66%	▲10.24
INC	Tusli Ram	25,491	37.90%	▲8.1
VHP	Ravinder	698	1.04%	New
Independent	Pratap Singh	640	0.95%	New
Independent	Ram Sarup Verma	640	0.95%	New
Independent	Purushottam Lal	599	0.89%	New
Independent	Ram Kumar Sharma	301	0.45%	New
Independent	Subh Ram	294	0.44%	New
Margin of victory		12,613	18.75%	▲2.15
Turnout		67,253	67.54%	▲3.65
Registered electors		1,02,461		▲17.41
LKD hold		Swing	▲10.24	

=== Assembly Election 1982 ===
1982 Haryana Legislative Assembly election: Loharu
Party	Candidate	Votes	%	±%
LKD	Hira Nand	25,108	46.42%	New
INC	Ram Narain Singh	16,124	29.81%	▲14.79
Independent	Chaman Lal	5,148	9.52%	New
JP	Om Parkash	3,709	6.86%	▼66.44
Independent	Mangla Ram	720	1.33%	New
Independent	Niranjan Lal	656	1.21%	New
Independent	Nanag	554	1.02%	New
Independent	Ram Kumar	473	0.87%	New
Independent	Sher Singh	459	0.85%	New
Margin of victory		8,984	16.61%	▼41.67
Turnout		54,094	63.21%	▲4.82
Registered electors		87,269		▲23.29
LKD gain from JP		Swing	▼26.88	

=== Assembly Election 1977 ===
1977 Haryana Legislative Assembly election: Loharu
Party	Candidate	Votes	%	±%
JP	Hira Nand	29,659	73.30%	New
INC	Shri Ram	6,076	15.02%	▼35.12
Independent	Om Prakash Sharma	4,729	11.69%	New
Margin of victory		23,583	58.28%	▲40.36
Turnout		40,464	57.92%	▼8.82
Registered electors		70,784		▲13.86
JP gain from INC		Swing		

=== Assembly Election 1972 ===
1972 Haryana Legislative Assembly election: Loharu
Party	Candidate	Votes	%	±%
INC	Chandrawati	20,565	50.13%	▲1.03
Independent	Hira Nand	13,213	32.21%	New
Independent	Pawan Kumar	5,530	13.48%	New
Independent	Bhagwan Singh	1,450	3.53%	New
Independent	Kalu Ram	262	0.64%	New
Margin of victory		7,352	17.92%	▲12.84
Turnout		41,020	68.01%	▲13.12
Registered electors		62,167		▲11.45
INC hold		Swing	▲1.03	

=== Assembly Election 1968 ===
1968 Haryana Legislative Assembly election: Loharu
Party	Candidate	Votes	%	±%
INC	Chandrawati	14,480	49.11%	▲3.31
Independent	Tulsi Ram	12,982	44.03%	New
Independent	Teka	1,857	6.30%	New
ABJS	Hanuman Dass	168	0.57%	New
Margin of victory		1,498	5.08%	▼3.74
Turnout		29,487	54.34%	▼13.03
Registered electors		55,780		▲3.64
INC hold		Swing	▲3.31	

=== Assembly Election 1967 ===
1967 Haryana Legislative Assembly election: Loharu
Party	Candidate	Votes	%	±%
INC	Hira Nand	16,240	45.79%	New
SSP	T. Ram	13,111	36.97%	New
Independent	C. Bhan	2,646	7.46%	New
Independent	Juglal	2,269	6.40%	New
Independent	Kanhiya	1,197	3.38%	New
Margin of victory		3,129	8.82%	
Turnout		35,463	69.15%	
Registered electors		53,822		
INC win (new seat)				

== See also ==
- Loharu
- Siwani
