= Zaildar =

Officer in charge of a Zail

Zaildar was an officer in charge of a Zail which was an administrative unit of group of villages during the Sikh Empire, British Indian Empire in Punjab and Dogra dynasty rule in Jammu and Kashmir (princely state). The Settlement Officer, with the advice of the Deputy Commissioner, was responsible for appointing Zaildars from amongst the men of the tribe or the area, thus reinforcing his preexisting social authority with the official sanction as the representative of the government. Zaildars were the revenue-collecting officers also responsible for maintaining law and order. The Lambardar and Safedposh assisted the Zaildar. The Zaildar in turn assisted the Deputy Commissioner. The Zaildar was more influential than the Lambardar (village head) because a Zail included several villages.

== Influence of Zaildari system ==
The position was important as it extended the influence of the colonial state into the villages. It also reinforced the already dominant social status of the Zaildar with official government sanction. The Zaildar exercised authority and patronage over the villagers.

== Appointment criteria ==
Zails were established and demarcated by the District collector (also called Deputy Commissioner) during the land revenue settlement exercise. Settlement officers, with advice from the District collector and subject to the final approval of the state's Financial Commissioner, appointed a Zaildar to each Zail either on a hereditary basis, for one person's life or for a fixed tenure. The Zaildars were equivalent to the Chaudharis of earlier times and were hand-picked by the higher authorities, who based their decision on issues such as caste or tribe, local influence, extent of landholding, services rendered to the state by him or his family, and personal character and ability. A Zaildar once appointed could only be removed from office for misconduct or neglect; removal on account of old age or disability was a harsh punishment and in such cases he could continue to operate through a representative.

"The introduction of the zaildari agency into any district must be approved by the local Government [Deputy Commissioner]. Any subsequent increase or decrease in the number of zaildars can be made under the orders of the Financial Commissioner, provided the percentage of the land revenue assigned for their emoluments is not exceeded ... No attempt should be made to fix the limits of zails, but the tribal organization and other important families of the tract should be explained in such detail as is necessary to enable Government to judge whether the agency should be introduced. Any proposals to appoint inamdars [also called safedposh] may be made in the same report. The opinions both of the Settlement Officer and of the Deputy Commissioner should be given. The report should be submitted to Government through the Commissioner and the Financial Commissioner, each of whom should record his views on the proposal made in it."

— Punjab Settlement Manual, 1930 (point 578, page 272).

== Role and remuneration of Zaildars ==
Zaildars were essentially revenue ministers and representatives of the British Empire who received remuneration for their duties, life grants of either a fixed amount or a grant equal to one per cent of the revenue of their zails from the assessment of any single village that they chose. Some of the responsibilities of the Zaildar corresponded to the responsibilities that fell under the Deputy Commissioner, such as revenue collection, mutations, local governance issues, related dispute resolution, etc. Other duties corresponded with the responsibilities that fell under the Settlement officer, such as revenue settlement, reassessments, preparation of maps, etc.

== Safedposh ==
In addition to these life inams, or grants, there were some Safedposhi grants of a semi-hereditary nature enjoyed by some of the leading agricultural families. They were semi-hereditary because one of the conditions of the grant was that on the death of an incumbent, his successor should, if possible, be a member of the same family.

== Abolition ==
=== India ===
==== Kashmir ====
Kashmir took lead in abolition of the Zaildari system where it was abolished in 1950.

==== Rest of India ====
Post the Indian independence in 1947, the system of Zails, Zaildars and Safedposh continued to exist till 1964. Then the system was abolished by CM of Punjab Partap Singh Kairon following demands from his ministers and Members of the Legislative Assembly, because of conflicts between the elected MLAs and the Zaildars. Police and Tehsil officers had been giving more weight to the opinions of Zaildars and this had undermined the MLAs. For the purpose, an amendment was carried out in Section 28 of The Punjab Land Revenue Act, 1887 through Section 3 of Punjab Act 27 of 1964.

=== Pakistan ===
After India, Pakistan abolished Zaildari system in 1967.

== In popular media ==
- Kapur Singh Ghuman wrote a book called Zaildar in 1972.
- Punjabi movies with Zaildar in the title include Zaildar (1972), Nikka Zaildar (2016) and Nikka Zaildar 2 (2017).

== See also ==
- List of Zaildars by Zail
- Indian feudalism
- Indian honorifics
- Maratha titles
- Jagirdar
- Mankari
- Lambardar
- Patwari
- Sarpanch
- Zamindar
- Princely state
