= Sadulpur =

City in Rajasthan, India

- City
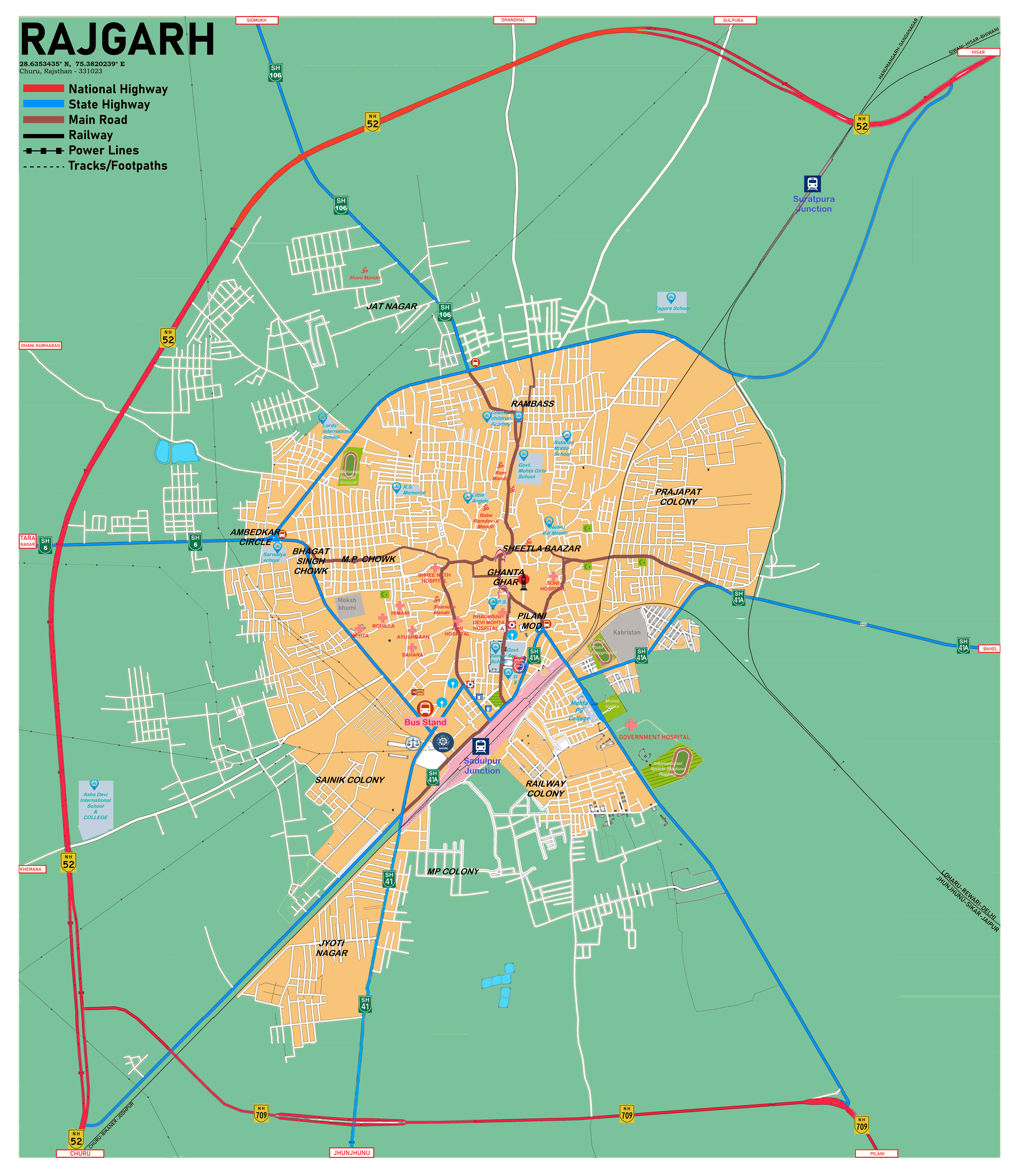
- Sadulpur City

- Location in Rajasthan, India Sadulpur (India)
- Coordinates: 28.64°N 75.38°E
- Country: India
- State: Rajasthan
- District: Churu
- Established: 1804

Government
  - Type: Municipality

Area
  - Total: 20 km^{2} (7.7 sq mi)
- Elevation: 479 m (1,572 ft)

Population (2011)
  - Total: 59,193
  - Density: 3,000/km^{2} (7,700/sq mi)

Languages
  - Official: Hindi, English
  - Native language: Bagri
- Time zone: UTC+05:30 (IST)
- PIN: 331023
- Telephone code: 01559
- Vehicle registration: RJ-10
- Nearest city: Hisar, Bhiwani, Rewari (Haryana); Sikar, Pilani, Jaipur (Rajasthan); New Delhi
- Lok Sabha Constituency: Churu
- Vidhan Sabha Constituency: Sadulpur

Sadulpur, natively known as Rajgarh is a city, municipality, tehsil and Legislative Assembly seat in Churu district of northern part of Rajasthan state in India. It was the territory of the Gaur dynasty later after defeated in war with Shekhawat Rajputs. It lies in Shekhawati region at an elevation of 239 m (784 ft). To distinguish Rajgarh from several other places with same name, Sadulpur has become a synonym of Rajgarh town's name in recent times.

== History ==
=== Construction of fort and founding of town ===
Rajgarh is named after Maharaja Raj Singh I of Bikaner. It was part of Shekhawati where Shekhawat branch of Rajputs had ruled. Great Raj Fort was built in 18th century by Maharaja Raj Singh I of Bikaner. Most Muslims in the town had migrated here from Narhar during the construction of the fort.

=== List of Maharajkumars ===
The area of Rajgarh was granted by HH Maharao Shri Sir Madho Singh Ji Bahadur in 1930 to his son. Maharajkumars were:

- Maharajkumar Bijay Singh (1930-1956)
- Maharajkumar Ajaypratap Singh (1956-1967)
- Maharajkumar Baghwatpratap Singh (1967-2000)
- Shri Sahib Anshupratap Singh (2000–present)
- Sahib Jagannath Singh

== Administration ==
Rajgarh is a municipality and city in Churu district of Rajasthan. The Rajgarh city is divided into 40 wards for which elections are held every 5 years. In 2011, Rajgarh Municipality had administration over total 9,902 houses to which it supplies basic amenities like water and sewerage. It is also authorize to build roads within Municipality limits and impose taxes on properties coming under its jurisdiction.

== Demography ==
Rajgarh religion data 2015
Religion	Percent
Hindus	59.80%
Muslims	39.63%
Distribution of religions Includes Sikhs (0.5%), Christian (0.6%), Jain (0.42%), others (0.1%)

In 2011, Rajgarh Municipality had a population of 79,232 of which 30,710 are males while 28,483 are females as per report released by Census of India 2011. The population of children aged 0–6 is 8122 which is 13.72% of total population of Rajgarh (M). In Rajgarh Municipality, Sex Ratio is of 927 against state average of 928. Moreover the child sex ratio in Rajgarh is around 880 compared to Rajasthan state average of 888. The literacy rate of Rajgarh city is 72.72% higher than the state average of 66.11%. In Rajgarh, male literacy is around 83.30% while the female literacy rate is 61.41%. Out of the total population, 19,699 were engaged in work or business activity. Of this 15,286 were males while 4,413 were females. In a census survey, the worker is defined as a person who does business, job, service, and cultivator and labor activity. Of the total 19699 working population, 88.96% were engaged in main work while 11.04% of total workers were engaged in marginal work. A large number of skilled and unskilled laborers from Sadulpur are working abroad in places such as Dubai, Oman, Qatar, Kuwait, and Saudi Arabia.

== Geography ==
=== Topography ===
Rajgarh is located at28.36°N 75.24°E. The area is located on bagar tract which runs along Haryana-Rajasthan border.

=== Climate ===
The region has record temperatures ranging from below freezing point in the winter to over 50 °C in summer. The District of Churu is also the hottest zone in the country.

== Economy ==
The town has a wholesale market for commodity trading. Sadulpur's Anaj Mandi serves as a regional agricultural trading point, with many shops, such as Raghav Industries and Mittal Trading Company.

Sadulpur is also known for delicious sweets, including sitta, peda, kaju katli, kalakand (milk cake made from milk / mawa/khoa).

== Education ==
The town has a post-graduate college (Mohta PG College) affiliated to University of Bikaner, Balika Mahavidalya, and Government College, also affiliated to Maharaja Ganga Singh University, Bikaner. There are several higher secondary, secondary, and primary schools in Rajgarh, some of them are Mohta Public School, Chandgiram Public School, Senior High Secondary and Lords International School.

== Transport ==
=== Roads ===
Rajgarh is connected to Bikaner, Jaipur, Delhi and other cities by road. It is about 240 km from Delhi by NH-10 via Rohtak, Hisar (170 km), then needs to take NH-52 on Kaithal-Hisar-Jodhpur Road (70 km). Shorter route from Delhi is via Rohtak, Bhiwani, Bahal (around 210 km). The National Highway No-52 passing through Rajgarh via Dokwa, Dudhwa Khara, Churu, Fatehpur, Salasar, etc. The State Highway No-41 passing through Rajgarh via Lambore, Jhunjhunu, etc. Malsisar. A bypass road attaches to NH52 to Taranagar, Bhadra, Hisar road. The National Highway No-709 Ext. also ending at Rajgarh.

=== Rail ===
Sadulpur Junction railway station, named after Maharaja Sadul Singh of Bikaner, is the name of main railway station in Rajgarh, which is the largest railway station in Churu district. It lies on Delhi-Rewari-Loharu-Sadulpur-Churu-Bikaner rail, Hisar-Sadulpur-Churu-Jodhpur rail and Sriganganagar-Jaipur rail links. Routes have been electrified and Sadulpur rail bypass cabin was constructed to enable goods train to bypass Sadulpur. After 2011, the metre gauge track was converted to 5 ft 6 in (1,676 mm) broad gauge.

Several trains connect Rajgarh and Sadulpur to major cities Delhi, Bikaner, Jaipur, Chennai, Lucknow, Degana, Sri Ganganagar, Hisar, Hanumangarh, Mumbai, Kolkata, Ahmedabad, Howrah, Jammu Tawi, ludhiana, kakinada, kamakhya, Rameshwaram, haridwar, secundrabad, Jaisalmer, Ujjain, Ayodhya, Mangalore, goa, Guwahati, and Pathankot.

=== Bus routes ===
Bus transportation facility can be availed to Hisar, Kaithal, Jaipur, Pilani, Churu, Rohtak, Delhi, Chandigarh, jammu tavi, haridwar, surat, shri nagar, Gurugram, Jaisalmer, Bikaner, Ludhiana, firojpur, jodhpur, chitorgarh, udaipur, kanpur Central, phalodi,

=== Airports ===
The nearest international airports are New Delhi Airport, Jaipur Airport. Hisar Airport and Bikaner Airport are two nearby airports.

== Notable people ==
- Bimal Jalan, a former Governor of India's Reserve Bank and Rajya Sabha member
- Devendra Jhajharia, Paralympic javelin thrower, only Indian to win two gold medals at Paralympics.
- Krishna Poonia, Padam Shri awardee, Olympian and MLA
- Lakshmi Mittal, steel tycoon born in tehsil Sadulpur (Rajgarh) of Churu district
- Sajjan Singh Malik was in Indian Army Special Force who got posthumous Kirti Chakra for his acts of bravery in fighting with terrorists on 7 July 2004 in Gundpura village of Baramula district. He killed three terrorists before becoming martyr.

== See also ==
- List of districts of Rajasthan
