= Lambardar =

Title in the Indian subcontinent

Numbardar or Lambardar (Hindi: नम्बरदार, Punjabi: ਲੰਬੜਦਾਰ, لمبردار, Urdu: لمبردار or نمبردار, Bengali: লম্বরদার/নম্বরদার, romanized: Lombordar/Nombordar) was the village headman responsible for tax collection in the village during the British Raj. They were appointed under the Mahalwari system.

== Etymology ==
The compound word numberdar is composed of the English word number (such as a certain number or percentage of the land revenue) and dar (در from the Persian loan word into Bengali, Hindi, Urdu and Punjabi languages, meaning the bearer, possessor, holder, keeper or owner), thus in this context it means the one who holds a certain percentage of the land revenue. The alternate term lambardar is a matter of dialect. In the Malwa region of Punjab and the states of Haryana, Himachal, Delhi, Uttra Khand, Uttar Pradesh, etc., the official term in the land revenue acts is numberdar. In Majha dialect of Punjabi language, the sound L become N, such as langhna (pass) and nambardar (percentage revenue holder) become naghna and lambardar respectively. The term lambardar is used in the land revenue acts of Jammu and Kashmir state of India and West Punjab (Pakistan) and Pakistan. Currently both terms, are easily substituted across India and Pakistan, including in the land revenue acts of Uttar Pradesh.

== History ==
During early and medieval times, cultivators just broke the land and cultivated as much they needed. During drought and famine they frequently abandoned the land and moved to other places. Hence, the land ownership was not a permanent concept. They were taxed by the rulers of the day based on the number of the cattle and area of the land cultivated. After the famine of 1783, many cultivators abandoned the villages and migrated elsewhere, and some land was sold by the owners. Slowly prominent farmers came into the possession of large lands, and they acquired the status of proprietors of the village estate and were recorded as such during the settlement of 1840-41 by the British Raj. These estates came to be known as zamindari or pattidari tenures, most influential and the largest estate-holders among them in due time became zaildars and lambardars. The British even used them as a localised dispute ombudsman and gave these big zamindars some moral policing rights. During the settlement of 1840-41, the tenants were classified into three classes: (a) those who had held land continuously for many years at a fixed rent and were not liable to ejectment, (b) the tenants in bhaiachara (brotherhood) villages who paid rent at the same rate as the members of brotherhood and who so long as they paid this rate were never ejected, (c) and those who cultivated from year to year under fresh agreement. These tenancies were further classified during 1863 settlement and a definite status was fixed on different classes of tenants. The ordinary division into tenants with or without right of occupancy was adopted. Thus, the concept of the formal permanent ownership of the land came into being, and became a legalized and formally documented.

== India ==
=== The Land Revenue System ===
Each estate is represented by one or more lambardars in its dealings with the government. Estates are grouped into patwar circles under the charge of a Patwari, while 15 to 20 circles form the charge of a Kanungo, whose duty is to supervise the work of Patwaris. An estate is the unit of land revenue administration for the collection of tax. Each estate is usually equal to a village. Each estate is individually assessed by a Patwari and its record of rights and register of fiscal and agricultural statistics maintained separately. All the proprietors are by law jointly responsible for payment of land revenue.

=== Land Reforms of India ===
After India's independence in 1947, government enacted several land reforms such as the assessment of permissible area in relation to a family instead of an individual, and reduced the permissible area to the set limit (e.g. to 7.25 hectares in Punjab) of land under assured irrigation capable of growing at least 1 crop in a year or 21.8 hectares in respect of any other land including banjar and land under orchards. In addition to legally capping the amount land holding by the government, the voluntary Bhoodan movement of 1950s and 60s also led to the donation of the land ownership from rich owners to the landless tenants. Government also undertook aggressive land consolidation and standardization of killa (agricultural plots of one acre each).

=== Legal description ===
In India, each state has its own land acts governing the system of Nambardari. Following acts are applicable to the states of Punjab, Haryana, Himachal Pradesh, Delhi, Rajasthan and Madhya Pradesh.

==== The Land Holdings Tax Act, 1973 ====
Before the Land Holdings Tax Act, 1973, was enacted, the lambardar was paid pachhotra (commission) at the rate of 5 per cent of land revenue. In this act various levies were consolidated into land holdings tax and lambardars' share was fixed at 3 per cent of the new tax revenue.

==== Present remuneration ====
Presently, remuneration varies from state to state, some states pay no wages or commission, some pay an honorarium and while others pay nothing.

Under the Digital India initiative, some states have taken to cutting delays in paying honorarium, set as percentage of the revenue collected from the respective estate, via the regular direct electronic transfer, the Government of Haryana is one such example.

In 2019, Government of Haryana raised the monthly honorarium for lambardars from INR1,500 to INR3,000.

== Pakistan ==
=== Legal description ===
The lambardari system in Pakistan is based on the pre-partition Indian land revenue system. After the 1947, both nations have made changes to the land revenue acts, leading to some differences in the practice and implementation, though the basic concept remains same. India has undertaken aggressive land reforms, capping the ceiling of the area of land holding, and distribution of the ownership of excess land above the ceiling limit to the cultivators tenants thus reducing the percentage of tenants by converting them into the permanent owners. These reforms are pending in Pakistan, leading to the landownership in limited hands.

==== The West Pakistan Land Revenue Act, 1967 ====
- Section 4 (28): Village Officer: person appointed under this Act whose duty is to collect, or to supervise the collection of, the revenue of an estate and include Kanungos, Patwaris, Service Centre Officials and Headmen (Lambardars).
- Section 36: The Board of Revenue may, with the previous approval of Government, make rules to regulate the appointments, duties, emoluments, punishments, suspension and removal of Village Officers.

==== The West Pakistan Land Revenue Rules, 1968 ====
Rule 16. Number of headmen.

1. A sufficient number of headmen shall be appointed to every estate, and this number when once fixed shall not be increased except by or under the order of the Commissioner.
2. Except as provided in Rule 21, if an estate or a considerable portion thereof is owned by Government, the headmen may be appointed from among the tenants and in other estates he shall be appointed from among the land owners.
3. The lessee of an uncultivated or forest estate owned by Government shall, during the currency of his lease, be the headmen thereof.

=== Feudals in the Senate ===
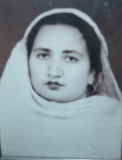
Begum Sarwat Imtiaz, the first female Lambardar of Pakistan.

After the independence, unlike India, Pakistan did not undertake the land aggressive land reforms to transfer the land ownership from zamindars to cultivators. As a result, the majority of the agrarian land holding still remains in the hands of very few powerful zamindars, who now hold sway over the political power and refuse to reform the land ownership to continue their hold over wealth and power. Almost all elected leaders of the state have been from the landed and feudal gentry in many cases holding the title of lambardar. That has resulted in a feudal system perpetrating the Pakistan Senate and its elected representatives. Most Presidents and prime ministers also have been from feudal stock, with the exception of martial law administrators and generals, who led coups.

The first female Lambardar in West Pakistan was Begum Sarwat Imtiaz who took oath in 1959. She was lambardar of village Chak 43/12 L, Chichawatni, District Montgomery (now Sahiwal). Presently her daughter Begum Arshia Azhar is Lambardar of said village. That was recognized as a milestone for women empowerment in patriarchal Pakistan and the Muslim world.

== See also ==
- Indian honorifics
- Indian feudalism
- Feudalism in Pakistan
- Gram panchayat
- Sarpanch
