= Village accountant =

Administrative government position in rural parts of the Indian sub-continent

A village accountant or karanam (Andhra Pradesh), patwari (Madhya Pradesh, Punjab, Telangana, West Bengal), patowary (Assam), talati (Gujarat, Karnataka, Maharashtra), Village accountant were known as Shanbag or Shanbogue or shanbagh in some erstwhile parts of present day Karnataka state which was hereditary in nature. lekhpal (Uttar Pradesh, Uttarakhand), village officer (Tamil Nadu, Kerala) is a government role in rural areas of the Indian subcontinent. Introduced during the early 16th century, it was maintained by the British Raj. The official, as a representative of the state, is responsible for keeping land records, agricultural records and collecting taxes and acting as the revenue police in certain areas where they were given special jurisdiction.

They are village-level revenue officials responsible for maintaining land records, collecting land revenue, and assisting in land surveys and verification. While the titles vary across states, their functions are broadly similar.

== History ==
Mughal emperor Akbar improved the patwari system, which had been introduced in the Indian subcontinent under the leadership of Sher Shah Suri. The East India Company and subsequently British crown continued with the system with some administrative changes. It denotes the office of the talati in rural Gujarat, Maharashtra and Karnataka. The office and its holder are known as Talatis, and holders of the office have adopted it as their family name. The talati replaced the kulkarni in Gujarat and Maharashtra. The duties of a talati are performed under a different title in other Indian states; a talati is known as a patwari in Telangana, Punjab and Haryana. Originally a land-holding clerk, the talati is now a paid, government-appointed official. A patil (patel in Gujarat) is an outsider who assists the talati in collecting revenue. It has been alleged that records maintained by the talati do not reflect actual positions, because the talati did not take into account the tribal custom of using the name of the adult male family member for land possession.

In 1813, duties of the Talati included preserving village records, monitoring daily activities, and gathering information about individuals (including mukhis and other village elites). The 1882 Gazetteer of the Bombay Presidency records the Talati as a village accountant, in charge of eight to ten villages, whose annual salary was £12-£18 (Rs. 120–180). The Talati was expected to live in one of the villages and visit each village every month to learn villagers needs and report them to the sub-divisional manager at the sub-divisional office. The Talati was also required to give each landholder an account with the landholder's dues. In August 1891, a talati's salary was recorded as low.

In 1884, Mountstuart Elphinstone was reported as saying that the talati promoted the government but reduced the authority of the patel; Elphinstone recommended minimising the interference. The appointment of a talati was viewed negatively by village chiefs, who saw him as a government representative in the absence of a kulkarni or watandar. The talati was also involved in collecting annual census data after Mrigashīrsha. Talatis are known as patwari in Bengal, karanam in Andhra Pradesh and North India, and kanakku pillai in Tamil villages.

== Etymology ==
Known as lekhpal in Uttar Pradesh, the word is derived from the Sanskrit root tal (to accomplish a vow, to establish or to fix) and has the same meaning in Marathi.

== Duties ==
The duties of a talati include maintaining village crop and land records and collecting taxes and irrigation dues.

Among the administration, the talati has the closest connection with the villagers. Generally in charge of a group of villages known as a saza, they are required to reside in the saza unless authorized by the Collector; however, most talatis were found to be in violation of the rule. Part of the Brahmin caste in most cases, the talati is generally considered a representative of the government.

As the lowest state functionary in the revenue-collection system, their job encompasses visiting agricultural lands and maintaining a record of ownership and tilth. The government of India has developed a Patwary Information System (PATIS), software which was deployed in at least two districts by 2005; deployment at the tehsil level is underway. A patwari reports to the tehsildar, a higher-level tax officer. A patwari can wield significant power and influence, and corrupt patwaris have escaped punishment due to their political connections. They have three main duties:

- Maintaining records of crops harvested
- Recording land-rights changes
- Accounting for the preparation of the above data

In the hilly regions of Indian state of Uttarakhand, British administration had given additional law enforcement powers and functions to patwaris. Known as income police, these officials continue to have the primary jurisdiction of law and order in these areas.

== Terminology ==
The khewat number is assigned to village land, and changes when the land is sold. The Khatuni number, an additional number assigned to village land after the khewat number, also changes when the land is sold. Girdawary, the record of land cultivation (crops and ownership), is maintained by the patwari in Telangana, by the Talati in Maharashtra, Gujarat and Karnataka, and similar officials in other Indian states. If a non-owner cultivates the land for an extended period, they may claim possession of the land.

In modern-day India, jamabandi are land records maintained for each village in a tehsil (township). A jamabandi includes the name of the owners, the area of cultivation (or land), owner shares, and other rights. It is revised periodically. A jamabandi is prepared by a patwari, and certified by the division revenue officer. Two copies are made: one for the government's record room, and the other for the patwari. In a number of states, land records have been computerized and are available on the Internet.

Lal Dora, a term introduced by the British Raj in 1908, is a red line drawn on revenue maps that delineates the village population from nearby agricultural land. It enables villagers to build houses without the Change in Land Use (CLU) authorization which would otherwise be needed to convert agricultural land to commercial or residential use.

== See also ==
- Adverse possession
- Khasra
- Lambardar
- Munshi
- Zaildar
