= Human Rights Protection Group & MFP Federation =

Human rights organization and protest group

- Founder: Prabhloch Singh
- Legal status: Section 8 NGO
- Headquarters: Chandigarh, India
- Website: www.humanrights.in
- Formerly called: Middle Finger Protests

Human Rights Protection Group & MFP Federation, formerly known as Middle Finger Protests, is a Chandigarh-based human rights organization and protest group led by Prabhloch Singh. The organization is in Special Consultative Status with the United Nations since 2023. The organization received its name from the protests during the Jessica Lal murder trial. It is also the organization behind the protests in the Sippy Sidhu murder case and has been active in various protests, including the Jyoti murder case, Aarushi murder case and Nirbhaya case.

== Background ==
The organization was the first to act in the Jessica Lal murder case from Manu Sharma's hometown Chandigarh. It was also featured in the Bollywood movie 'No One Killed Jessica' in 2011. The leader of the protest group is Prabhloch Singh, a human rights activist.

== Activities and events ==
Prabhloch Singh, the founder of the organisation, represented India as an observer at the United Nations Headquarters during the 13th Annual International Human Rights Summit 2016 held from 25 to 27 August 2016. Prabhloch delivered a speech on civil rights in India while addressing dignitaries consisting of human rights luminaries, ambassadors, and representatives of permanent missions to the United Nations. Prabhloch also addressed the Youth for Human Rights International World Tour-South Asia Summit on 22 and 23 March 2017, as a guest speaker. The NGO organises a two-day human rights conference titled, "#LeaveNoOneBehind International Conclave on Human Rights, Community Welfare, Philanthropy & UN SDGs". The 2017 conference was inaugurated by MP Kirron Kher. The second edition of the Conclave was held on 11 and 12 November 2019, on the occasion of the 550th birth anniversary of Guru Nanak Puducherry's Lt.Governor Kiran Bedi addressed the audience along with MLA Kanwar Sandhu, Indian musician Rabbi Shergill, NGO's founder Prabhloch Singh, Prof Tanmeet Kaur Sahiwal, among others. A livelihood services project was announced on the second day of the Conclave.

=== Respectable funeral services ===
The organisation runs a pan India initiative wherein it provides for and arranges respectful last rites for the downtrodden who cannot afford funeral services for their loved ones. The NGO got a mobile mortuary and funeral van flagged off by MP Kirron Kher on 11 November 2019.

=== Livelihood services ===
The NGO announced a livelihood services project aimed at providing respectable livelihood to 500 poor families in the first phase. This project was announced on the second day of the 2.0 edition of the International Conclave organised by Human Rights Protection Group & MFP Federation.

== Protests and Candle light vigils ==
=== Sippy Sidhu case ===
Sippy Sidhu was a National level shooter and an advocate who was murdered on 20 September 2015 at a park in Chandigarh

==== Protest outside the residence of IGP, Chandigarh ====
Chandigarh, 29 November 2015: The group organized a blind folded candle light procession outside the residence of IGP, Chandigarh to protest the inaction of cops in the Sippy Sidhu murder case.

==== Protest in Sector 17, Chandigarh ====
Chandigarh, 13 December 2015: A protest in Sector 17, Chandigarh where the group protested against the inaction of cops in the Sippy Sidhu murder case. Savita Bhatti, wife of late Jaspal Bhatti also participated in the protest.

==== Protest outside the residence of Prime Minister Narendra Modi in Delhi ====
New Delhi, 15 December 2015: The group intimated the Commissioner of Police of Delhi, BS Bassi, through an e-mail that they would be holding a protest outside the residence of Prime Minister of India, Narendra Modi, on Saturday. Later, members of the group were detained in Delhi during their protest outside the PM's residence. The group claimed to have acquired prior approvals. Kirron Kher, Member Parliament from Chandigarh offered support to the group following the protest outside the PM's residence.

=== Aarushi murder case ===
New Delhi, 30 January 2011: Members of the human rights group participated in a protest at Delhi's Jantar Mantar to press for justice in the Aarushi murder case.

=== Jyoti murder case ===
Chandigarh, 6 January 2013: Middle Finger Protests organised a non-violent protest in Sector 17 plazza to create public awareness about the case and to condemn crime against women. The founder of the group, Prabhloch Singh, announced that a protest would be organised outside the residence of the DGP, Haryana due to the failure of the cops in arresting the accused. First-time Congress MLA from Himachal Pradesh, Ram Kumar Chaudhary is the prime accused in the murder of 24 year old Jyoti who was found murdered in Panchkula on 22 November 2012.

=== Jessica Lal case ===
New Delhi, 29 April 1999: Jessica Lal, a 34-year old model and celebrity bartender was shot dead by Manu Sharma, son of Congress leader Venod Sharma. A trial court acquitted the accused on 21 February 2006. Middle Finger Protests was the first to act from the accused's home town Chandigarh and organized candle light vigils and protests demanding justice for Jessica Lal. Owing to public outrage, the case was re-investigated and Manu Sharma was finally convicted and put behind bars.
