= Dahima, Hisar =

Dahima
- village
- Location in Haryana Dahima (India)
- Coordinates: 29.045632°N 75.801096°E
- Country: India
- State: Haryana
- District: Hisar district
- Municipality: Hissar-1 Tehsil

Government

Population (2011)
  - Total: 2,273
- Postal code: 125006
- ISO 3166 code: IN-HR
- Website: www.hisar.nic.in

Dahima is a village in Hissar-1 Tehsil, Hisar district, Haryana, India. It is between the towns of Hisar and Tosham at about 16.6 kilometres (10.3 mi) on the Main District Road 108 (MDR 108). Its Pin code is 125006.

== Demographics ==
As of 2011 India census, Dahima (Hisar) had a population of 2273 in 442 households. Males (1205) constitute 53.01% of the population and females (1068) 46.98%. Dahima has an average literacy (1429) rate of 62.86%, less than the national average of 74%: male literacy (853) is 59.69%, and female literacy (576) is 40.3% of total literates (1429). In Dahima (Hisar) 13.28% of the population is under 6 years of age (302). The main families of this village are CHAMAR's. People of dahima mostly belongs to Dhania & singhania's clan.

== Adjacent villages ==
- Dabra, Hisar
- Mirkan, Hisar
- Bhojraj
- Balawas
- Nalwa
- Khanak, Bhiwani
- Gunjar
- Kanwari
- Ladwa, Hisar
- Saharwa
- Kutiya
