= Kartikeya Sharma =

Member of Parliament, Rajya Sabha

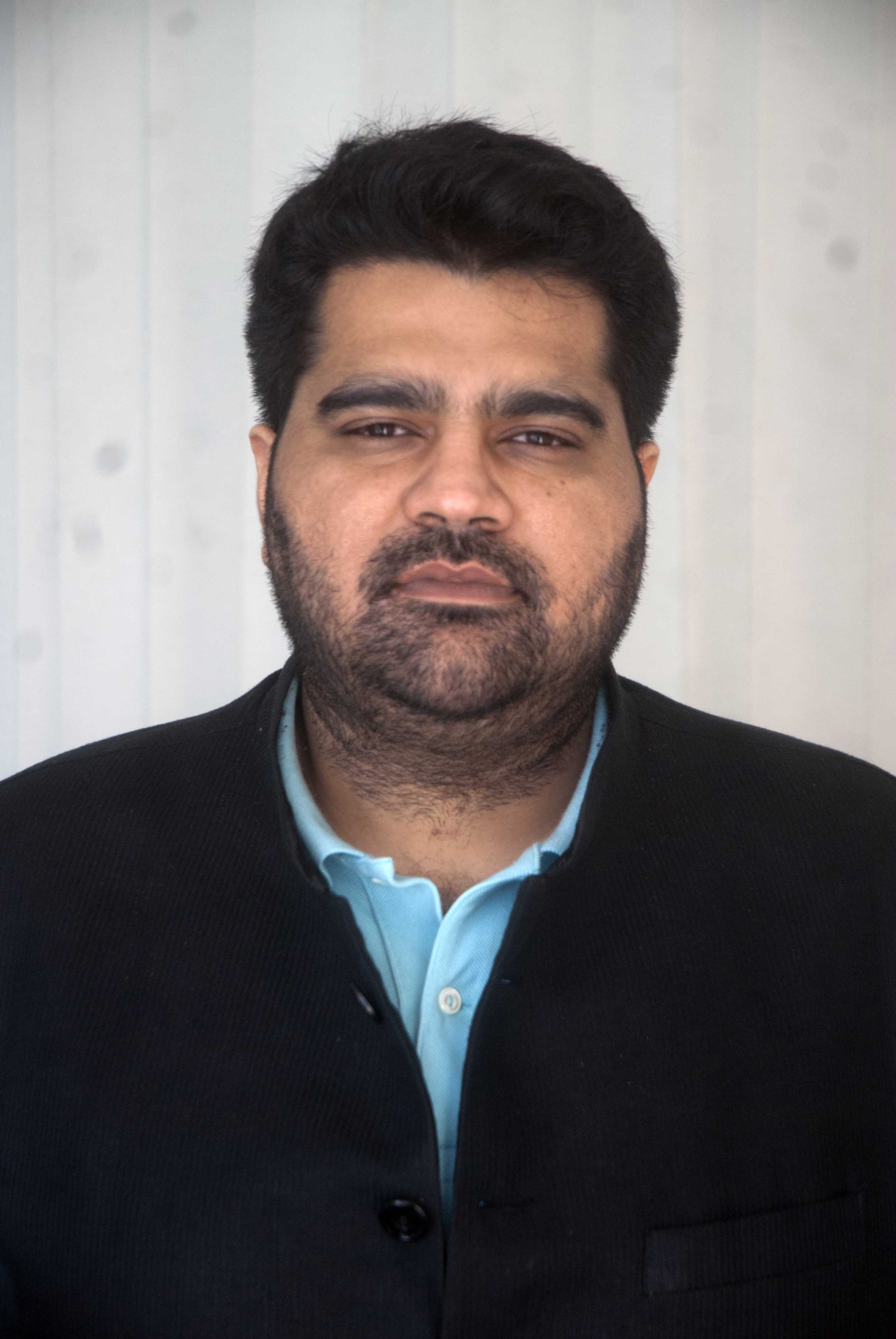

Member of Parliament, Rajya Sabha
- Incumbent
- Assumed office 2 August 2022
- Constituency: Haryana

Personal details
- Born: 14 May 1981 (age 45)
- Party: Bharatiya Janata Party
- Spouse: Aishwarya Sharma (m. 2011)
- Parents: Venod Sharma; Shakti Rani Sharma
- Relatives: Manu Sharma (brother); Kuldeep Sharma (father-in-law)
- Occupation: ITV Media network (Founder)
- Known for: India News; NewsX; The Sunday Guardian; Aaj Samaj
- Nickname: Kartik Sharma

Kartikeya Sharma (born 14 May 1981) is an Indian politician, entrepreneur, and media baron, currently serving as a Member of the Rajya Sabha, the upper house of the Indian Parliament from Haryana. He won from the Bharatiya Janata Party (BJP) seat, defeating the Congress leader Ajay Maken in a highly contested election on 10 June 2022. Kartikeya is the founder of ITV Media Network, which operates multiple news channels, including those in National, English, Hindi, and 7 regional languages, along with print newspapers such as the Sunday Guardian, Daily Guardian, and Aaj Samaj.

== Personal life ==
Sharma was born to politician Venod Sharma and Shakti Rani Sharma on 14 May 1981. He is married to author and professor Aishwarya Sharma (daughter of Indian National Congress politician Kuldeep Sharma, former speaker of Haryana Legislative Assembly) since 2011. On April 24, 2023, Sharma had a road accident on the Western Peripheral Expressway while returning to Gurugram from a Parshuram Jayanti program in Charkhi Dadri. In accordance with his affidavit, Kartikeya Sharma declares ownership of assets exceeding Rs 387 crore.

== Political career ==
Kartikeya Sharma is elected to Rajya Sabha in 2022 Rajya Sabha elections. Kartikeya Sharma was part of a parliamentary delegation, headed by Deputy Chairperson of the Rajya Sabha, Harivansh Narayan Singh. The delegation attended the 145th assembly of the Interparliamentary Union (IPU) in Kigali, the capital of Rwanda, from October 11 to 15, 2022. In December 2022, he attended the Shri Parshuram Mahakumbh organised in Karnal.

During a parliamentary intervention, Sharma referred to Namo Shakti Rath, a women-focused mobile health screening initiative involving the use of mobile units to promote preventive healthcare and early detection, particularly for breast and cervical cancers, as part of a broader discussion on public health and cancer prevention.

== Business ==
Kartikeya Sharma completed his Bachelor of Business Administration from King's College London. In 2007, he founded ITV Media. He launched a series of regional TV channels under India News; by 2015, India News managed five regional channels that covered Haryana, Rajasthan, Madhya Pradesh and Chhattisgarh, Uttar Pradesh, Uttarakhand, Bihar and Jharkhand.

Later on, Sharma acquired, through ITV Media, English language news channel NewsX. He entered the print media with the acquisition of The Sunday Guardian, an English language Sunday newspaper, and Aaj Samaj, a Hindi language daily newspaper. He has also been involved with News Wire Services, an Indian TV news wire service.

Kartikeya Sharma is the Owner of Picaadily Hotels, Which Along With Hyatt owns a Range of Properties in Delhi and Parts of Haryana and Punjab. In 2015, Sharma set up Pro Sportify with Ashish Chadha, CEO of the Sporty Solutionz, a company that runs the Pro Wrestling League.

== Awards ==
Kartikeya Sharma got the Champions of Change Award 2022. He also won the award for the Best CEO of the Year at the 2016 eNBA Awards. He was honoured with Person Of The Year Award by the Businessworld in 2022.
