= Pardeep Chaudhary =

Indian politician (born 1961)

Member of Haryana Legislative Assembly
- In office 2019–2024
- Preceded by: Latika Sharma
- Succeeded by: Shakti Rani Sharma
- Constituency: Kalka
- In office 2009 – 2014
- Preceded by: Chander Mohan Bishnoi
- Succeeded by: Latika Sharma
- Constituency: Kalka

Personal details
- Party: Indian National Congress

Pardeep Chaudhary (born 1961) is an Indian politician from Haryana. He is a former MLA from Kalka in Panchakula district. He won the 2019 Haryana Legislative Assembly election representing the Indian National Congress.

== Early life and education ==
Chaudhary is from Kalka, Panchakula district, Haryana. His is the son of late Roshan Lal. He runs his own business. He completed his Bachelor of Arts degree in 1981 at a college affiliated with Punjab University, Chandigarh.

== Career ==
n 2024, he lost to Shakti Rani Sharma of the BJP by a margin of 10,883 votes. Chaudhary won from Kalka Assembly constituency representing Indian National Congress in the 2019 Haryana Legislative Assembly election. He polled 57,948 votes and defeated his nearest rival, Latika Sharma of the Bharatiya Janata Party, by a margin of 5,931 votes. He first became an MLA from Kalka on the Indian National Lok Dal ticket winning the 2009 Haryana Legislative Assembly election where he defeated Satvinder Singh Rana of the Indian National Congress by a margin of 21,187 votes. In 2014, he lost to Latika Sharma of the BJP.
