= Gian Chand Gupta =

Indian politician

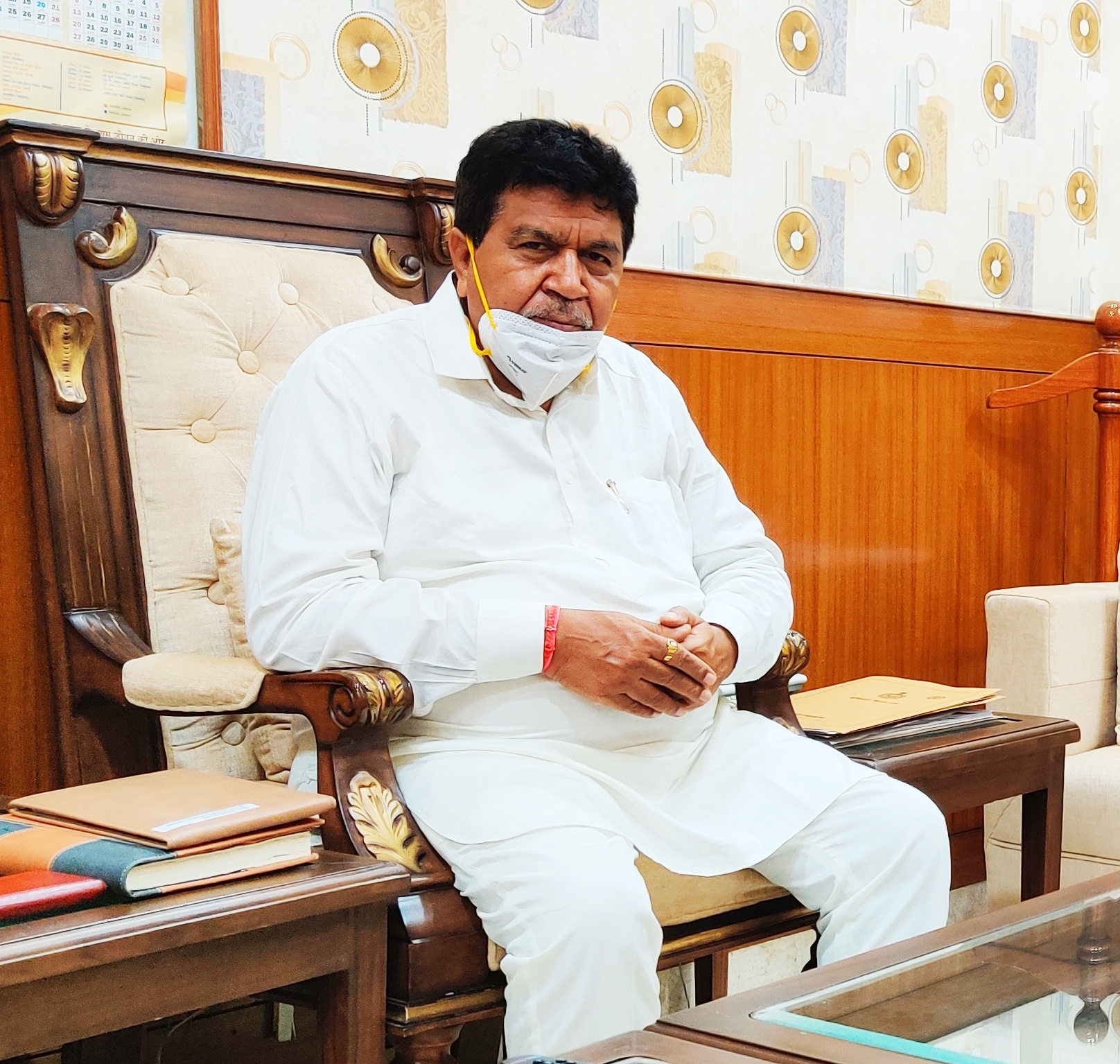

Speaker of the Haryana Legislative Assembly
- In office 4 November 2019 – 25 October 2024
- Deputy: Ranbir Singh Gangwa
- Preceded by: Kanwar Pal Gujjar
- Succeeded by: Harvinder Kalyan

MLA, Haryana Legislative Assembly
- In office 2014–2024
- Preceded by: Devender Kumar Bansal
- Succeeded by: Chander Mohan
- Constituency: Panchkula

Personal details
- Born: 25 May 1948 (age 78)
- Party: Bhartiya Janata Party
- Spouse: Bimla Rani
- Children: 2

Gian Chand Gupta (born 25 May 1948) is an Indian politician who served as Speaker of Haryana Legislative Assembly from the Bharatiya Janata Party representing the Panchkula constituency in Haryana.

On 4 November 2019, he was unanimously elected the Speaker of Haryana Legislative Assembly.

== Political career ==
- State President B.J.P State Chandigarh (U.T.) during 1991-92, 1993–95, 1995–97,
- Mayor, Municipal Corporation, Chandigarh (U.T.) from 23.12.1997 to 23.12.1998
- State Treasurer, Bhartiya Janata Party, Haryana Pradesh during 2002-2005, 2009-2012.
- State Vice President, Bhartiya Janata Party 2006-2008, Haryana State.
- State Convener “Ajeewan Sahyog Nidhi” Haryana Pradesh
- Chairman, Public Accounts Committee, Haryana Vidhan Sabha from 24.04.2015 to 26.10.2019.
- Government Chief Whip, Haryana from 08.03.2016 to 26.10.2019.
- Speaker, Haryana Legislative Assembly from 4 November 2019 to 25 October 2024.
- MLA from Panchkula City he belongs to BJP.
