= Jogi Ram Sihag =

Indian politician

Jogi Ram Sihag is an Indian politician. He was elected to the Haryana Legislative Assembly from Barwala in the 2019 Haryana Legislative Assembly election as a member of the Jannayak Janta Party.
