= Sampat Singh =

Indian politician

Member of Legislative Assembly
- Constituency: Nalwa, Fatehabad, Bhattu Kalan

Personal details
- Party: Indian National Lokdal
- Spouse: Krishna Singh
- Children: 2
- Website: www.sampatsingh.in
- As of 15 July, 2021

Sampat Singh Budania (born 20 April 1949) is a former Finance Minister of Haryana, India. As a Janata Party candidate, he was elected to the Haryana Legislative Assembly from the Bhattu Kalan constituency in 1982 and has been re-elected on five occasions. He was leader of the opposition from 1991 to 1996. His six election successes made him the most senior Indian National Congress legislator in 12th Haryana assembly. He has held many important portfolios in state government as minister.

== Personal life ==
Sampat Singh was born in the village of Bhattu Kalan, Fatehabad District, Haryana, on 20 April 1949. His father was Ram Chander.Educated in the village and at Hisar, he holds MA and B.Ed. degrees. He is married to Krishna Singh and has two children.

Singh was a lecturer in political science at Dayanand College, Hisar for five years from 1972. He has been jailed several times, including in 1972–73 and 1983, while campaigning for various causes.

== Career ==
=== State politics ===
Singh has been elected to the Haryana Legislative Assembly in 1982, 1987, 1991, 1998, 2000 and 2009.

Singh was appointed at political secretary to Devi Lal in 1977 and held the post for two years. At this point, Devi Lal headed the Janata Party. Singh stood unsuccessfully in the Bhattu Kalan constituency by-election of 1980, claiming afterwards that he lost "because of widespread use of unfair means". He won the seat in the 1982 state assembly elections.

Between 1991 and 1996, Singh was Leader of the Opposition in the state assembly.

Heeding views of his close supporters, Singh quit the Indian National Lok Dal (INLD) on 14 July 2009 and held a meeting with his supporters and workers on 18 July 2009 in Hisar. He described the INLD as being in "complete disarray", no longer aligned with the principles of Devi Lal and subject to the nepotism of its then leader, Om Prakash Chautala. After ending his 32-year association with it, he joined the Indian National Congress (INC) on 27 July 2009.

The INC selected Singh as their candidate for the Nalwa constituency in Hisar. He then won the seat in the 2009 elections by defeating the sitting member, Jasma Devi of the HJC.

=== National politics ===
As an INLD politician, Singh contested the 2009 Indian general election from Hisar Lok Sabha constituency on a National Democratic Alliance ticket. He lost narrowly to former chief minister Bhajan Lal.

Singh stood as an INC candidate for a seat in the national parliament in the 2014 Indian general election. He finished in third place in the Hisar Lok Sabha constituency.

== Political career ==
- 1977–1979: Political Secretary to Devi Lal, Chief Minister of Haryana
- 1980: election conveyor for Devi Lal during 7th Lok Sabha elections
- 1980: contested by-election from Bhattu Kalan
- 1981: State Youth Party President until 1984, when he resigned at the age of 35 to make way for other youth members
- 1982: elected to 6th Vidhan Sabha from Bhattu Kalan constituency. Member of the Scheduled Caste and Welfare Society of Haryana Vidhan Sabha
- 1984: District Party President, Hisar until 1987
- 1987: elected to 7th Vidhan Sabha, Bhattu Kalan constituency, Minister of Industry, Excise & Taxation, Town & Country Planning, Home, Local Bodies, Jails, Public Relations, Irrigation & Power, Finance, Parliamentary Affairs & Planning
- 1991: elected to 8th Vidhan Sabha, Bhattu Kalan constituency, Leader of Opposition, Haryana
- 1996: contested election from Bhattu Kalan
- 1998: elected to 9th Vidhan Sabha, Fatehabad constituency, Chairman, Assurance Committee, Haryana Vidhan Sabha
- 1999: Cabinet Minister for Finance, Parliamentary Affairs & Planning
- 2000: elected to 10th Vidhan Sabha, Bhattu Kalan constituency, Cabinet Minister for Finance, Parliamentary Affairs & Planning
- 2005: contested election from Bhattu Kalan
- 2008: by-election contested in Adampur

== Positions held ==
- President, District Lok Dal, Hisar
- Member State Lok Dal Executive
- Member, Haryana Sangharsh Samiti
- President, Haryana State Yuva Lok Dal
- National General Secretary, Samajwadi Janata Party
