= Ved Narang =

Indian politician

Ved Narang is a former member of the Haryana Legislative Assembly from the INLD representing the Barwala constituency in Haryana.
