= Indri (whisky) =

Indian single malt whisky

Indri Single Malt Whisky
- Product type: Single malt whisky
- Current owner: Piccadily Agro Industries Limited
- Produced by: Piccadily Agro Industries Limited
- Country: India
- Introduced: 2021
- Related brands: Manu Sharma
- Markets: International
- Website: www.indri.in
- Production details; Barrels: 75,000; Stills: 14 pot stills (7 wash and 7 spirit stills); Capacity: 30 KLPD (malt); Awards; 2023 – Whiskies of the World: Best in Show (Diwali Collector's Edition); 2022 – World Whiskies Awards: Best Indian Single Malt; 2024 – San Francisco World Spirits Competition: Gold; 2025 – Las Vegas Global Spirit Awards: Best World Whisky

Indri Single Malt Whisky is an Indian single malt whisky produced by Piccadily Agro Industries Limited. Introduced in 2021 and officially launched in 2022, it is named after Indri village in Haryana's Karnal district, where its distillery is located.

In 2023, the Indri Diwali Collector's Edition received the "Best in Show, Double Gold" distinction at the Whiskies of the World Awards.

== History ==
Indri was developed by Piccadily Agro Industries Limited, a family-run company dating to the 1960s that originally produced molasses-based spirits. The company established a malt distillery in Indri in 2011, with spirit for its first single malt laid down in 2012. The site includes a cooperage and bottling plant.

Its first expression, Indri–Trini (The Three Wood), was released in 2021 under Surrinder Kumar, a former master blender at Amrut, with Scottish distiller Graeme Hamilton Bowie as master distiller. The whisky uses six-row Indian barley grown in Rajasthan, unlike the two-row barley typical of Scotch, and is distilled in copper pot stills before maturation in oak casks.

Indri entered export markets including the United States, United Kingdom, and Australia. Its Diwali Collector's Edition won "Best in Show, Double Gold" at the 2023 Whiskies of the World Awards. In 2025, the brand received further international awards and expanded distribution across Europe and the Middle East. That year, the company opened the Indri Experience Centre at its distillery, offering guided tours and tastings.

== Controversy ==
Indri Whisky is produced by Piccadilly Agro Industries Limited (PAIL), a company where Manu Sharma, now operating under the name Siddharth Sharma, is a major stakeholder and listed as the brand's founder. Sharma is widely known for his conviction in the high-profile 1999 Jessica Lal murder case, where he was sentenced to life imprisonment for fatally shooting Lal after she refused to serve him a drink after the bar's closing hours. Following his release from prison in June 2020, Sharma joined his family's distillery business, leading to the launch of the Indri brand. While his background was largely omitted from domestic business coverage, a December 2024 investigation by Scotland's The Sunday Post brought his criminal history to international attention amidst PAIL's plans to build a £15 million distillery in Portavadie, Scotland.

=== Production and maturation ===
The distillery combines Indian-grown six-row barley with pot-still distillation. Its malt production capacity is listed as 30 kilolitres per day, with seven wash stills and seven spirit stills. Different cask types are central to the range: Trini combines bourbon, French wine and Pedro Ximénez sherry influences, whereas Dru is drawn from ex-bourbon casks.

The names of several releases refer to their styles or intended markets—Trini highlights three woods, Dru identifies a cask-strength bottling, and the City Series focuses on travel retail. Special editions also include the annual Diwali bottlings and releases connected with House of the Dragon.

Indri–Trini was the initial release, followed by further expressions as the brand expanded outside India. Indri–Agneya offers a lightly peated style; Indri–Dru is bottled at higher strength. The Founder's Reserve bottling instead emphasizes extended maturation, including time in Bordeaux wine casks. Together these expressions illustrate the producer's use of different oak treatments and bottling strengths.

Pedro Ximénez is a type of sherry associated with one of Trini's maturation casks. The references to Pedro Ximénez, French wine and bourbon likewise describe previous cask contents, not ingredients added to the finished whisky. Cask finishing and selection are therefore useful distinctions when comparing the expressions. The distillery also has an on-site cooperage and bottling facility for its whisky range.

== Expressions ==
- Indri–Trini: The Three Wood – Matured in ex-bourbon, ex-French wine, and ex-Pedro Ximénez sherry casks. Distilled from 2012, it was described by its producer as India's first triple-cask single malt.
- Indri–Agneya – Lightly peated expression matured in sherry and bourbon casks.
- Indri–Dru – Cask-strength expression bottled at 57.2% ABV from ex-bourbon barrels, launched in 2023 for export markets.

=== Limited editions ===
- Indri Diwali Collector's Edition (2023, 2024 and 2025).
- Indri Single Cask.
- House of the Dragon Exclusive Editions – HBO collaboration comprising House of Black, a peated single malt, and House of Green, an unpeated variant.
- City Series – Travel-retail exclusives themed around global cities, including Bengaluru and Dubai.
- Indri Founder's Reserve 11-Year-Old – Matured in ex-Bordeaux red wine casks for 11 years and dedicated to founder Pt. Kidar Nath Sharma.
- Travel Retail Triple Cask – Triple-cask expression exclusive to global travel retail.

== Market ==
According to The Economic Times and Business Standard, Indri was among the fastest-growing single malt whisky brands in 2024, with reported worldwide sales of approximately 170,000 nine-litre cases.

Exports began in 2022 to the United States, United Kingdom and Australia, followed by Europe and the Middle East. Of roughly 170,000 nine-litre cases (2.04 million bottles) sold in 2024, around 124,000 were sold domestically and 46,000 overseas. IWSR data ranked Indri as India's largest-selling single malt that year, while reports described it as the world's fastest-growing single malt for a second consecutive year.

=== Domestic and international presence ===
Indri is available in 28 Indian states and union territories and distributed in more than 40 countries across Asia, Europe, North America, Oceania and Africa. Major markets include the United States, United Kingdom, United Arab Emirates, Germany, Japan, Australia and Singapore.

== Awards and recognition ==
- 2022: Indri Trini was named Best Indian Single Malt at the World Whiskies Awards and received Gold medals at the International Spirits Challenge, Global Whisky Masters and Las Vegas Global Spirits Awards.
- 2023: The Diwali Collector's Edition won Best in Show – Double Gold at Whiskies of the World, along with Gold at the Spirits Selection Awards and Tokyo Whisky & Spirits Competition.
- 2024: Indri Dru and Indri Founder's Reserve received Gold and Platinum medals at international competitions, including the San Francisco World Spirits Competition, Las Vegas Global Spirits Awards, USA Spirits Ratings and Tokyo Whisky & Spirits Competition. Indri was named Brand of the Year at The Spirits Business Awards. Indri Dru won Best Indian Single Malt at the World Whiskies Awards and Whisky of the Year at USA Spirits Ratings, scoring 95 points.
- 2025: Indri Agneya and the Diwali Collector's Edition (2025) earned Gold at the World Whisky Masters and Asia World Spirit Competition, while Indri Dru received the World's Best Whisky title at the Miami Global Spirits Awards.

== See also ==
- Indian whisky
- Amrut (whisky)
- Paul John Whisky
