= Saharwa =

- Village
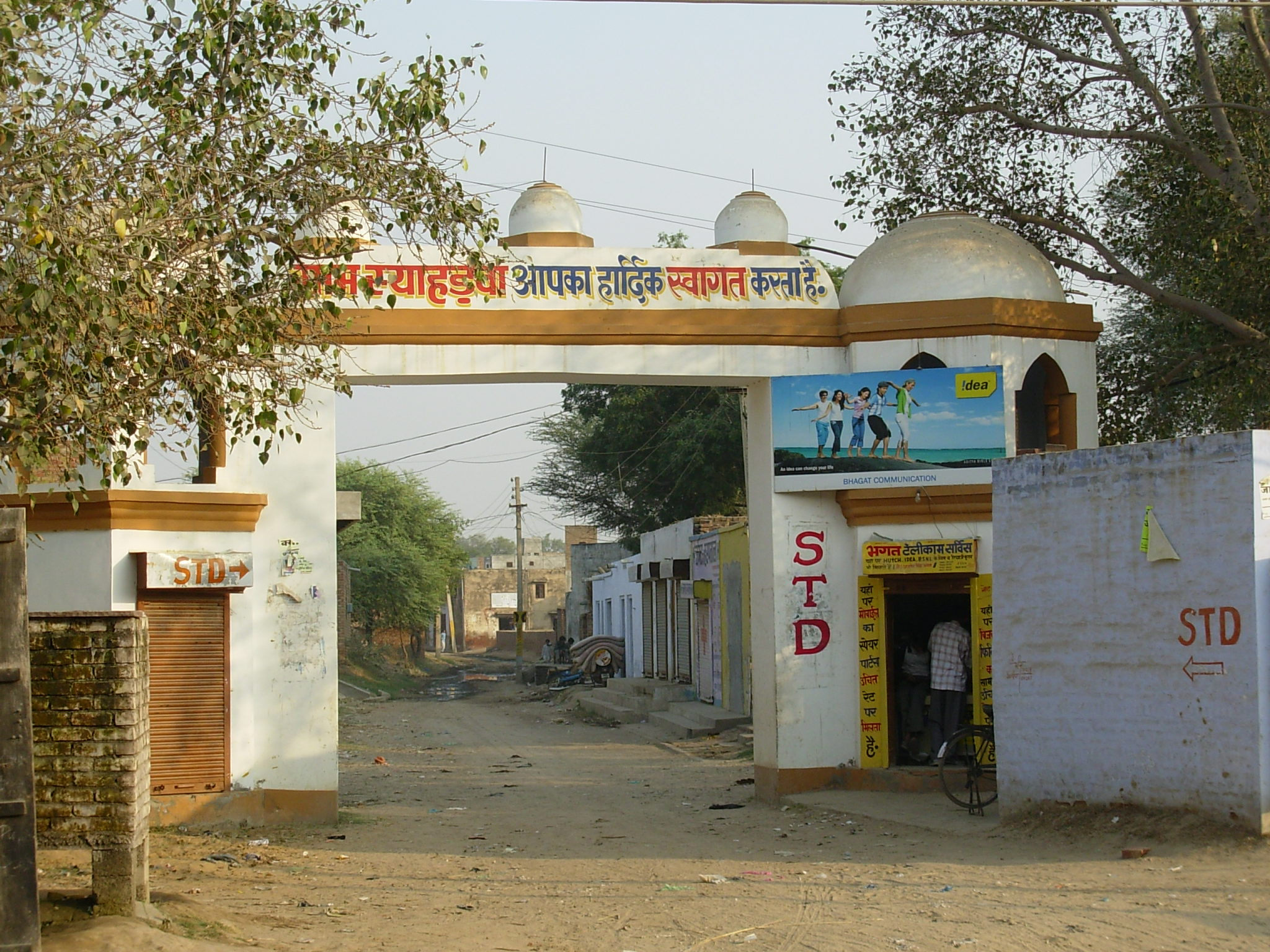
- Entrance gate of Saharwa village

- Location in Haryana Saharwa (India)
- Coordinates: 28.92427106456666°N 75.73974892089836°E
- Country: India
- State: Haryana
- District: Hisar district
- Tehsil: Hissar-1 Tehsil
- Established: 1700-1800AD

Population (2011)
  - Total: 4,804
- Postal code: 125001
- ISO 3166 code: IN-HR
- Website: haryana.gov.in

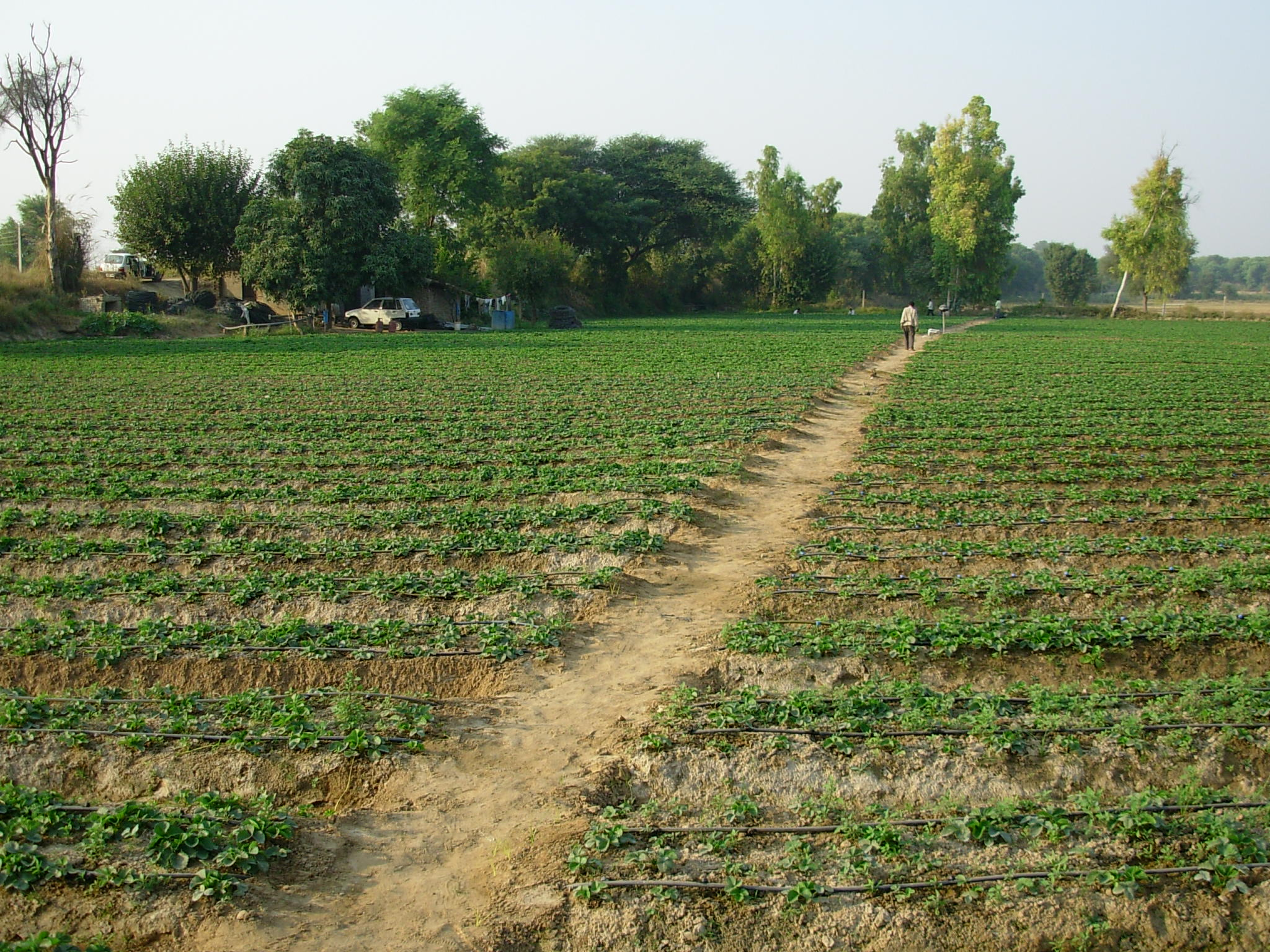
Strawberry fields in the deserts of Saharwa village

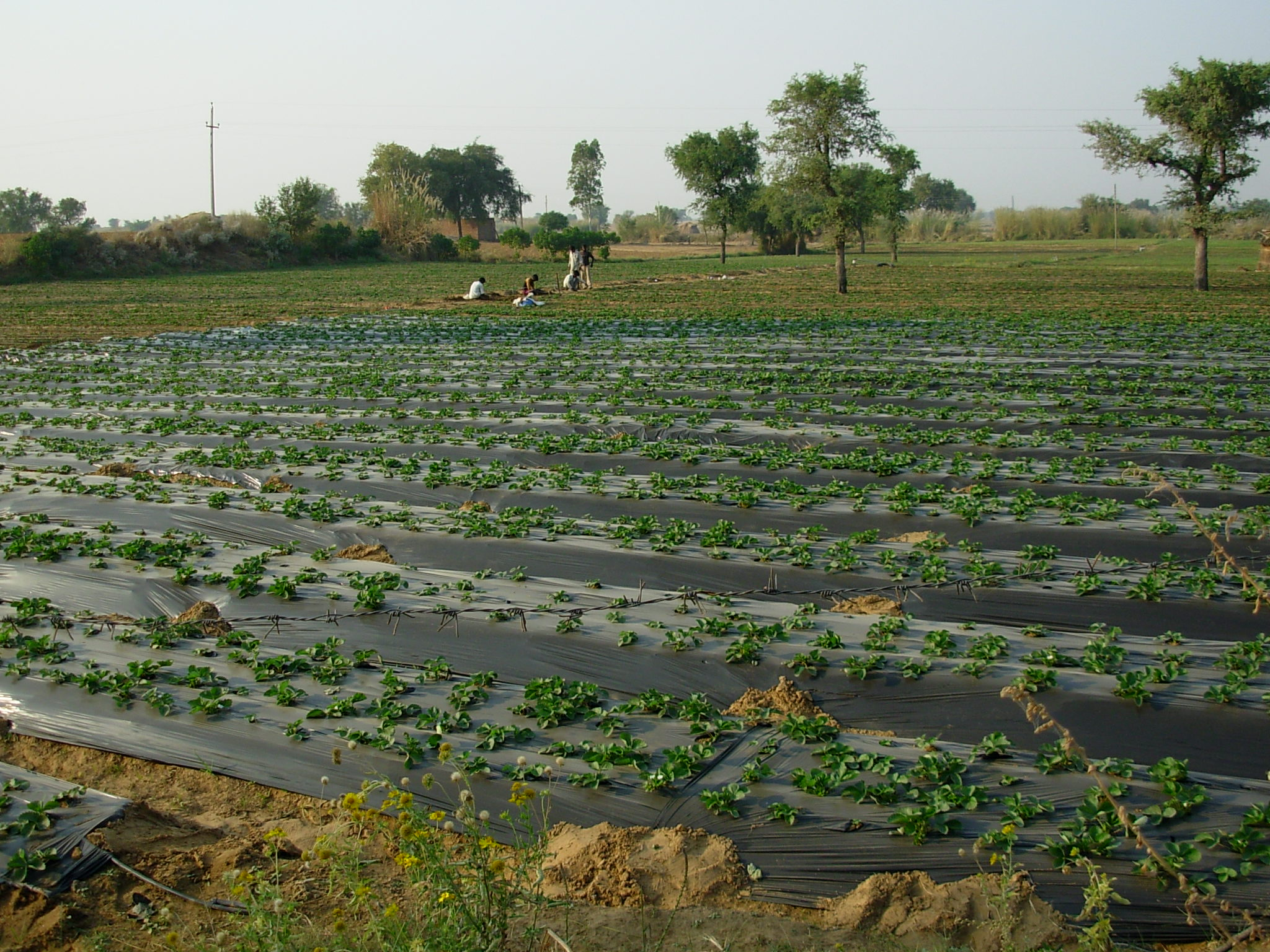
Strawberry fields in the deserts of Saharwa village

Saharwa is a village in Hisar tehsil and district in Haryana, India, located on the Hisar-Isarwal road about 28 km from Hisar. It is situated at the boundary of the Hisar and Bhiwani districts. It also marks the onset of Thar Desert. Saharwa village was established about 350 years ago in what was then Punjab province. The village has over the last decade become known for strawberry cultivation, and it is now the second largest producer of strawberries after Mahabaleshwar, Maharashtra. There is a small but locally revered temple of Khattu Shyamji. In 2013 the village was identified by the Geological Survey of India as having large reserves of gypsum.

== Demographics ==
A total of 4804 people reside in Saharwa, divided into 905 families. 2525 residents are males, while 2279 are females, according to the 2011 population census. The population of children from age 0–6 is 598, which makes up 12.45% of the total population of the village. The average sex ratio of Saharwa is 903, which is higher than the Haryana state average of 879. The child sex ratio as per the census is 987, higher than the Haryana average of 834.

Saharwa village has a lower literacy rate than Haryana as a whole. In 2011, the literacy rate was 70.38% compared to 75.55% in Haryana. Male literacy stands at 79.99% while female literacy is at 59.59%.

Jat is the major caste in Sharawa village. Scheduled Castes (SC) constitute 12.41% of the total population in the village. The village currently does not have any Scheduled Tribe (ST) population. Out of the total population, 2302 were engaged in work activities. 69.90% of workers describe their work as main work (employment or earning more than six months) while 30.10% were involved in marginal activity providing livelihood for less than six months. Of 2302 workers engaged in main work, 1152 were cultivators (owner or co-owner) while 179 were agricultural labourers.

== Amenities ==
Saharwa has one of the oldest and largest rural water works in the state (established in 1971). It is a canal-based water works facility spread over several acres of land. There are three community buildings or chaupals/paras (परस) (Badi, Choti, and Harijan). Choti paras has been recently renovated. There is an old Ayurvedic dispensary (very poorly maintained) and well-maintained dispensary for cattle. Saharwa is part of Talwandi Rukka Primary Health Centre and Mangali Community Health Centre. There are three Anganwadi centres in Saharwa. There is a government high school (boys') established in 1971 and a primary girls-only school. There is one private school. An 11 kV sub-station for the village is situated at the periphery of the village. There are five ponds (Bharana, Kikrala, Mahendrana, Johdi, and Thukhrala) in the village. The ones situated close to the village are more dirty water collections of a large size. A co-operative society and Sarva Haryana Gramin Bank Branch is located at the bus stand.

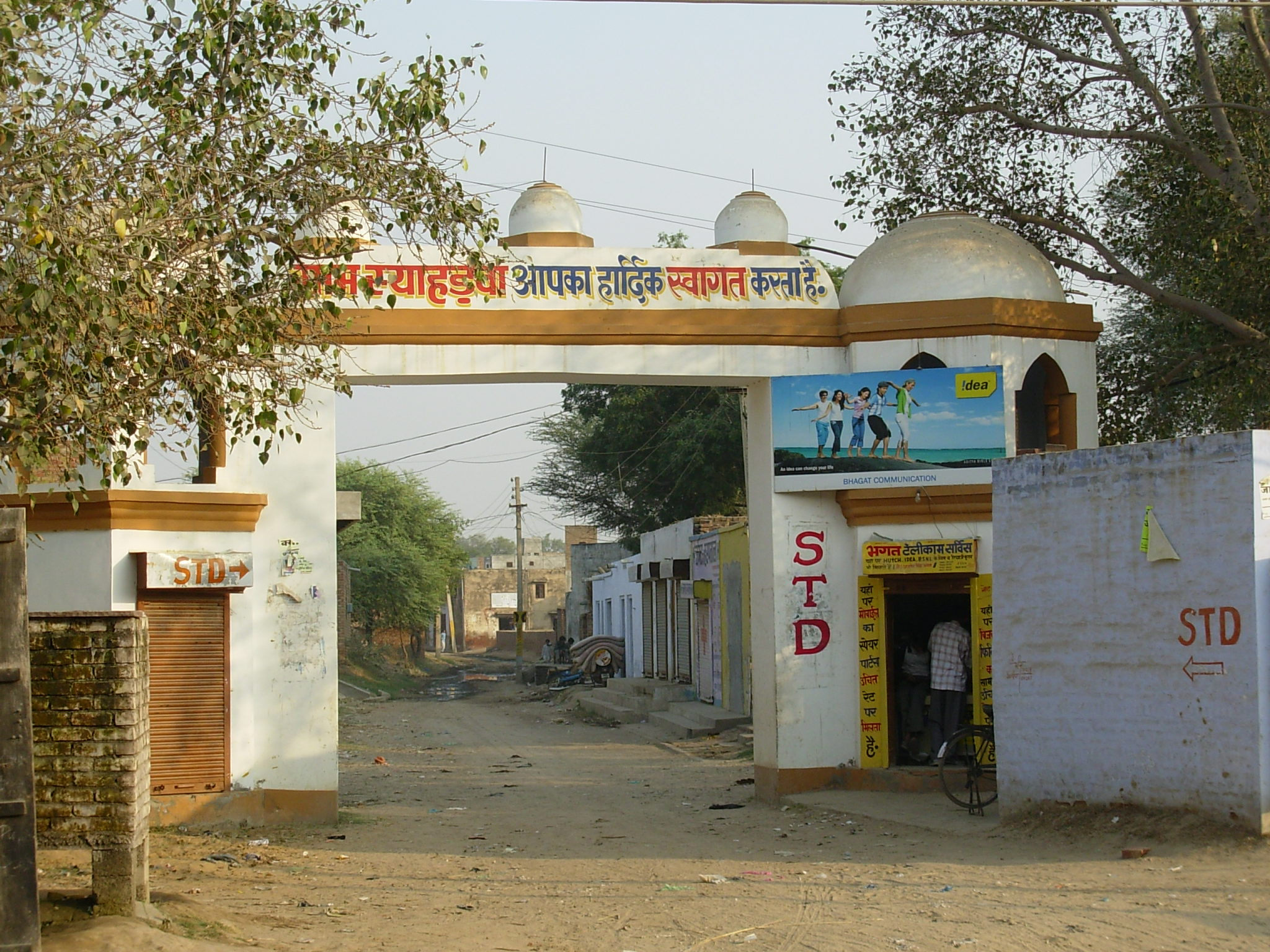
Picture showing traditional gateway at the entrance of Indian villages

There is small market to meet the routine requirements at the bus stand. Located very close to the bus stand is a local wine shop (ठेका देसी शराब). There is also a post office (Saharwa is one of the 45 post offices of Hisar district with pincode 125001). There are two petrol pumps within about 1 km from the bus stand, one on the road to Talwandi Rukka and the other on the road to Chanana.

== Economy ==
There are several brick kilns in the village which have existed over the last three decades.

== Administration ==
Saharwa is part of Nalwa Chaudhry (Vidhan Sabha constituency) and Hisar (Lok Sabha constituency). Saharwa is part of Hisar Zila Panchayat (Ward 11) and Hisar-1 (Ward 22) block samiti. Brahm Dev is an influential farmer and pioneer of strawberry cultivation in the village. He is also current Zila Parishad member and current Zila Parishad Chairman of District Hisar; his father, Chudhary Tulsi Ram Ji, was also elected as sarpanch of the village many times. Sh.Roshan Lal Mundlia Ji, his elder brother, was also the village sarpanch twice. Baby Jaybhagwan is a member of the block samiti and she was elected unanimously. Local administration is through the panchayat (elected body) and patwari (revenue officer). The panchayat is headed by the sarpanch (current sarpanch is Ashwani Kumar). The panchayath of Saharwa has 15 wards. The sarpanch and all panchayat members were elected unanimously. The census village code of Saharwa is 06-080-00394-060932.

== Climate and geology ==
Saharwa has a continental climate, with very hot summers and relatively cool winters. Summer starts in April and lasts until the middle of October. May is the hottest month, with maximum day temperatures in the 48 °C (118 °F) range. Hot winds, locally known as loo, are strong and frequent from May to July. Intermittent dust storms are common. Hisar experiences a weak monsoon season, from late June to September, with about 15 inches (380 mm) of rain. Winter starts in November and is mild and sunny, although temperatures may reach freezing on some nights. Most of the soil of Saharwa is sandy soil. Few acres of land especially on the north-western side have clay soil. On the southern end of the village is an artificial lake created by the overflow of water from the BN Chakarbarthy (renamed Siwani Feeder) canal at the first pump house.

== Transportation ==
Saharwa is well connected by bitumen roads. It lies at the junction of Siwani-Tosham road and Hisar-Isarwal road. There is hourly bus service from Hisar. The nearest major railway station is Siwani (15 km away) and Hisar (28 km).

== Sports and culture ==
Saharwa is known to host various sporting events regularly. Traditional kabaddi events were held at the local sports stadium in 2017 and 2018. The village also has common training facilities for training in kabaddi and other athletics.
