= Nalwa =

- Village
- Location in Haryana, India Nalwa (India)
- Coordinates: 28°52′24″N 75°54′54″E
- Country: India
- State: Haryana
- District: Hisar

Government
  - Type: Local government
  - Body: Panchayat
  - Sarpanch: Sh. Krishan Kaswan
  - MLA: Ranbir Singh Gangwa
- Elevation: 215 m (705 ft)

Population (2011)
  - Total: 4,665

Languages
  - Official: Hindi
- Time zone: UTC+5:30 (IST)
- PIN: 125037
- ISO 3166 code: IN-HR
- Vehicle registration: HR
- Sex ratio: 899 ♂/♀
- Lok Sabha constituency: Hisar
- Vidhan Sabha constituency: Nalwa (Vidhan Sabha constituency)
- Website: haryana.gov.in

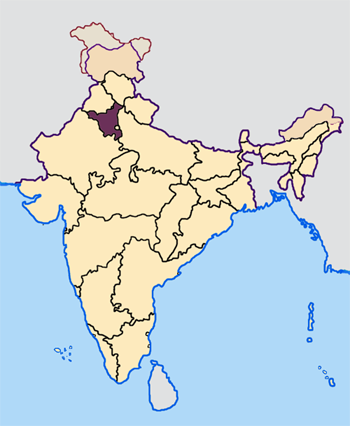
Nalwa & Haryana in India

Nalwa is a village, as well as an Assembly Constituency in Haryana Legislative Assembly, located in Hisar district in the state of Haryana in India.

It is situated 168 kilometres (104 mi) from the national capital New Delhi and 27 kilometres (17 mi) from the district headquarters Hisar on the Hisar-Tosham road.

Nalwa village is the native village of O. P. Jindal, an industrialist. His son Naveen Jindal is the Ex Member of Parliament (In 14th and 15th Lok Sabha) from Kurukshetra, Haryana.

== History ==
The village gets its name from General Hari Singh Nalwa. Nalwa was a title bestowed on Hari Singh by Maharaja Ranjit Singh after the former single-handedly killed a tiger that had attacked him. On witnessing the event, Ranjit Singh's exclamation, "Wah! Mere Raja Nal, wah!" (Bravo my Raja Nal, bravo), became "Nal wah". After Sardar Balwant Singh Nalwa's tenure as the Deputy Commissioner of Hisar district during the British Raj when Haryana was an integral part of undivided Punjab, the village was called 'Nalwa'. Balwant Singh was a fifth-generation descendant of the famed Sikh General.

== Demographics ==
As per Census 2011 - Nalwa is a large village located in Hisar, Haryana with total 845 families residing. The Nalwa village has population of 4665 of which 2457 are males while 2208 are females as per Population Census 2011.

People's living in the village are Hindu and Muslim. There are Bishnoi, Jat, Brahmins, Dhanak, Chamar, Thakar, Maniyar(Hindu), Maniyar(Muslim), Yadav, Balmiki, Baniya, Khati, Nai, Dhobi, Chimpi, Sunar and some other castes.

=== Literacy rate ===
Nalwa village has lower literacy rate compared to Haryana. In 2011, literacy rate of Nalwa village was 69.24% compared to 75.55% of Haryana. In Nalwa Male literacy stands at 79.16% while female literacy rate was 58.20%.

=== Sex ratio ===
In Nalwa village population of children with age 0-6 is 657 which makes up 14.08% of total population of village. Average Sex Ratio of Nalwa village is 899 which is higher than Haryana state average of 879. Child Sex Ratio for the Nalwa as per census is 899, higher than Haryana average of 834.

=== Caste factor ===
Nalwa village of Hisar has substantial population of Scheduled Caste. Scheduled Caste (SC) constitutes 28.83% of total population in Nalwa village. The village Nalwa currently doesn't have any Scheduled Tribe (ST) population.

== Transportation ==
=== Road ===
The village lies on State Highway (Major District Road 108). MDR 108 from Hisar to Bhiwani connects it to Tosham and other near by villages.

Bus service is the major means of transport in the village. Bus services are provided by Haryana Roadways and other private operators. Nalwa Bus Stand was established in 2016.

Nalwa is well-connected by the metalled asphalt (paved bitumen) road. List of the nearby city and villages away from the village→

- Hisar 28 kilometres (17 mi)
- Tosham 13 kilometres (8.1 mi)
- Bhiwani 35 kilometres (22 mi)
- Hansi 25 kilometres (16 mi)
- Siwani 26 kilometres (16 mi)
- Balawas 1.5 kilometres (0.93 mi)
- Kanwari 4 kilometres (2.5 mi)
- khanak 5 kilometres (3.1 mi)
- New Delhi 168 kilometres (104 mi)
- Chandigarh 265 kilometres (165 mi) via Hisar

=== Train connectivity ===
Nalwa does not have a rail station. Nearest major train stations accessible by road are 28 kilometres (17 mi) at Hisar, 25 kilometres (16 mi) at Hansi and 35 kilometres (22 mi) at Bhiwani city.

=== Airport connectivity ===
Hisar Airport, the nearest functional airport and flying training club is 28 kilometres (17 mi) away. Currently, there are no commercial domestic or international flights from this airport. Nearest domestic and international airports are 200 kilometres (120 mi) at Indira Gandhi International Airport at Delhi and 260 km (160 mi) Chandigarh International Airport.

== Education ==
According to the data maintained by the Government of India's Department of Statistics, the Government College, Nalwa was established in 1985, Government ITI in 1980.

== Nalwa Assembly constituency ==
Nalwa became a new Assembly constituency of Legislative Assembly of Haryana by the 2008 delimitation exercise. Earlier, most of the villages of this constituency were under Adampur, a stronghold of Bhajan Lal. Some of the villages were earlier with the Bawani Khera Constituency.

== Geography ==
Mayapuri, 2 kilometres (1.2 mi) on the Nalwa-Tosham road forms a small part of Nalwa. Nalwa is a spiritual place with many temples.
