= Kalka Assembly constituency =

Constituency of the Haryana legislative assembly in India

Coordinates: 13.3221°S 71.9542°W

Kalka
- Constituency No. 1 for the Haryana Legislative Assembly

Constituency details
- Country: India
- Region: North India
- State: Haryana
- Division: Ambala
- District: Panchkula
- Lok Sabha constituency: Ambala
- Total electors: 2,00,639
- Reservation: None

Member of Legislative Assembly
- 15th Haryana Legislative Assembly
- Incumbent Shakti Rani Sharma
- Party: BJP
- Elected year: 2024

Kalka Assembly constituency is one of the 90 assembly seats of Haryana, India. Kalka is a part of Panchkula district.

Shakti Rani Sharma is the current MLA from Kalka.

== Members of Legislative Assembly ==
Year	Member	Party
1967	Lachhman Singh	Independent
1968	Kishori Lal	Indian National Congress
1972	Kishori Lal	Indian National Congress
1977	Lachhman Singh	Janata Party
1982	Lachhman Singh	Independent
1987	Kanti Parkash Bhalla	Lok Dal
1991	Purush Bhan	Indian National Congress
1993^	Chander Mohan	Indian National Congress
1996	Chander Mohan	Indian National Congress
2000	Chander Mohan	Indian National Congress
2005	Chander Mohan	Indian National Congress
2009	Pardeep Chaudhary	Indian National Lok Dal
2014	Latika Sharma	Bharatiya Janata Party
2019	Pardeep Chaudhary	Indian National Congress
2024	Shakti Rani Sharma	Bharatiya Janata Party

^By Poll

== Election results ==
=== Assembly Election 2024 ===
2024 Haryana Legislative Assembly election: Kalka
Party	Candidate	Votes	%	±%
BJP	Shakti Rani Sharma	60,612	41.53	▲0.90
INC	Pardeep Chaudhary	49,729	34.07	▼11.19
Independent	Gopal Sukhomajri	31,688	21.71	New
BSP	Charan Singh	1,374	0.94	▼1.07
AAP	Om Parkash Gujjar	858	0.59	New
NOTA	None of the Above	740	0.51	▼0.07
Margin of victory		10,883	7.46	▲2.82
Turnout		1,45,960	72.24	▼0.22
Registered electors		2,00,639		▲14.35
BJP gain from INC		Swing	▼3.73	

=== Assembly Election 2019 ===
2019 Haryana Legislative Assembly election: Kalka
Party	Candidate	Votes	%	±%
INC	Pardeep Chaudhary	57,948	45.26	+29.90
BJP	Latika Sharma	52,017	40.63	0.21
JJP	Kiran Chaudhary	7,739	6.04	
INLD	Satinder Singh	4,963	3.88	−21.27
BSP	Ashwani Nagra	2,573	2.01	−5.87
NOTA	Nota	737	0.58	
Independent	Umesh Kumar	684	0.53	
Margin of victory		5,931	4.63	−10.64
Turnout		1,28,031	72.46	−6.85
Registered electors		1,76,698		12.50
INC gain from BJP		Swing	4.84	

=== Assembly Election 2014 ===
2014 Haryana Legislative Assembly election: Kalka
Party	Candidate	Votes	%	±%
BJP	Latika Sharma	50,347	40.42	38.35
INLD	Pardeep Chaudhary	31,320	25.14	−18.84
INC	Manvir Kaur	19,139	15.36	−6.23
BSP	Satvinder Singh Rana	9,817	7.88	2.62
HJCPV	Shakti Rani Sharma	7,661	6.15	
Independent	Sudesh Sharma	2,435	1.95	
Independent	Ajaib Singh	1,301	1.04	
NOTA	None of the Above	888	0.71	
Independent	Vijay Bansal	807	0.65	
Margin of victory		19,027	15.27	−7.11
Turnout		1,24,570	79.31	2.10
Registered electors		1,57,064		28.13
BJP gain from INLD		Swing	-3.56	

=== Assembly Election 2009 ===
2009 Haryana Legislative Assembly election: Kalka
Party	Candidate	Votes	%	±%
INLD	Pardeep Chaudhary	41,625	43.98	20.16
INC	Satvinder Singh Rana	20,438	21.60	−41.50
Independent	Bhagat Singh	16,771	17.72	
BSP	Vijay Bansal	4,975	5.26	3.17
HJC(BL)	Ram Gopal Mehta	4,854	5.13	
Independent	Virander Singh	2,762	2.92	
BJP	Virender Singh (Bhau)	1,958	2.07	−7.37
Margin of victory		21,187	22.39	−16.89
Turnout		94,642	77.21	13.18
Registered electors		1,22,579		−49.86
INLD gain from INC		Swing	-19.11	

=== Assembly Election 2005 ===
2005 Haryana Legislative Assembly election: Kalka
Party	Candidate	Votes	%	±%
INC	Chander Mohan	98,765	63.09	▲11.41
INLD	Pardeep Chaudhary	37,289	23.82	N/A
BJP	Sham Lal	14,769	9.43	▼29.79
BSP	Pawan Kumar	3,267	2.09	▼2.14
Independent	Sanjeev Katoch	1,073	0.69	−−−
Margin of victory		61,476	39.27	▲26.82
Turnout		1,56,537	64.03	▲4.81
Registered electors		2,44,462		▲21.50
INC hold		Swing	▲11.41	

=== Assembly Election 2000 ===
2000 Haryana Legislative Assembly election: Kalka
Party	Candidate	Votes	%	±%
INC	Chander Mohan	61,581	51.68	▲10.71
BJP	Sham Lal	46,738	39.22	▲13.64
BSP	Jagdish Urf Jagdip Chaudhri	5,034	4.22	▲0.57
HVP	Krishan Pal	1,441	1.21	N/A
Independent	Harminder Singh	1,137	0.95	N/A
BSP(A)	Balkishan	1,116	0.94	N/A
Independent	Sadhu Singh	858	0.72	N/A
Independent	Prithvi Singh	555	0.47	N/A
Margin of victory		14,843	12.46	▼2.93
Turnout		1,19,159	59.22	▼10.75
Registered electors		2,01,203		▲2.59
INC hold		Swing		

=== Assembly Election 1996 ===
1996 Haryana Legislative Assembly election: Kalka
Party	Candidate	Votes	%	±%
INC	Chander Mohan	54,929	40.97	N/A
BJP	Sham Lal	34,300	25.58	N/A
SAP	Pardeep Kumar	33,714	25.14	N/A
BSP	Kaur Singh	4,901	3.66	N/A
Arya Samaj	Rajinder Singh	1,739	1.30	N/A
Independent	Kurria	1,339	1.00	N/A
JD	Bharat Raj Singh	629	0.47	N/A
Independent	Dara Chand	533	0.40	N/A
Margin of victory		20,629	15.38	N/A
Turnout		1,34,086	69.97	N/A
Registered electors		1,96,114		N/A
INC hold		Swing	N/A	

=== Assembly By-election 1993 ===
1993 Haryana Legislative Assembly by-election: Kalka
Party	Candidate	Votes	%	±%
INC	Chandermohan	82,918	N/A	N/A
Independent	Pradeep Kumar	21,118	N/A	N/A
Margin of victory		61,800	N/A	N/A
INC hold		Swing	N/A	

=== Assembly Election 1991 ===
1991 Haryana Legislative Assembly election: Kalka
Party	Candidate	Votes	%	±%
INC	Purush Bhan	29,025	32.30	▼8.26
HVP	Lachhman Singh	24,034	26.74	New
BJP	Nardev	22,040	24.52	▲21.99
JP	Kanti Parkash Bhalla	5,169	5.75	N/A
BSP	Prem Singh	4,779	5.32	N/A
Independent	Amar Singh	1,516	1.69	N/A
Independent	Krishan Chand	731	0.81	N/A
Independent	Jagdish Chand	583	0.65	N/A
Margin of victory		4,991	5.55	▼4.22
Turnout		89,873	65.71	▼2.82
Registered electors		1,41,447		24.90
INC gain from LKD		Swing	▼18.03	

=== Assembly Election 1987 ===
1987 Haryana Legislative Assembly election: Kalka
Party	Candidate	Votes	%	±%
LKD	Kanti Parkash Bhalla	38,473	50.33	▲46.64
INC	Brij Bhushan	31,001	40.55	▲14.14
BJP	Pooran Chand	1,935	2.53	N/A
Independent	Ram Kishan	1,289	1.69	N/A
VHP	Jaswant Singh	1,020	1.33	N/A
Independent	Om Parkash S/O Amin Chand	466	0.61	N/A
Independent	Mani Ram	427	0.56	N/A
Independent	Om Parkash S/O Nana Singh	425	0.56	N/A
Independent	Kesa Ram	348	0.46	N/A
Margin of victory		7,472	9.77	▼3.49
Turnout		76,446	68.53	▼3.11
Registered electors		1,13,251		▲40.39
LKD gain from Independent		Swing	▲10.64	

=== Assembly Election 1982 ===
1982 Haryana Legislative Assembly election: Kalka
Party	Candidate	Votes	%	±%
Independent	Lachhman Singh	22,544	39.68	New
INC	Sukhdev Singh	15,006	26.41	▲23.87
Independent	Anokh Singh	7,460	13.13	N/A
JP	Roop Lal	4,617	8.13	▼62.16
LKD	Ram Gopal	2,093	3.68	New
CPI	Abhey Singh	1,652	2.91	N/A
Independent	Sohan Lal	1,384	2.44	N/A
Independent	Sarwan Dass	848	1.49	N/A
Independent	Ram Kumar	418	0.74	N/A
Independent	Paras Ram	351	0.62	N/A
Margin of victory		7,538	13.27	▼29.84
Turnout		56,810	71.64	▲2.45
Registered electors		80,671		▲21.51
Independent gain from JP		Swing	▼30.60	

=== Assembly Election 1977 ===
1977 Haryana Legislative Assembly election: Kalka
Party	Candidate	Votes	%	±%
JP	Lachhman Singh	31,915	70.28	New
Independent	Kishori Lal	12,338	27.17	New
INC	Sardari Lal	1,155	2.54	▼47.40
Margin of victory		19,577	43.11	▲39.49
Turnout		45,408	69.19	▼3.93
Registered electors		66,393		▲6.47
JP gain from INC		Swing		

=== Assembly Election 1972 ===
1972 Haryana Legislative Assembly election: Kalka
Party	Candidate	Votes	%	±%
INC	Kishori Lal	22,173	49.95	▼8.39
Independent	Lachhman Singh	20,565	46.33	▲11.78
Independent	Jumma Ram	968	2.18	New
Independent	Shakti Prasad	686	1.55	▲1.13
Margin of victory		1,608	3.62	▼20.16
Turnout		44,392	73.12	▲4.26
Registered electors		62,359		▲6.41
INC hold		Swing		

=== Assembly Election 1968 ===
1968 Haryana Legislative Assembly election: Kalka
Party	Candidate	Votes	%	±%
INC	Kishori Lal	22,880	58.34	▲27.72
Independent	Lachhman Singh	13,552	34.55	▲2.16
VHP	Krishna Ram	1,522	3.88	New
RPI	Ved Parkash	806	2.06	New
Independent	Jhandoo Ram	297	0.76	New
Independent	Shakti Parshad	164	0.42	New
Margin of victory		9,328	23.78	▲22.01
Turnout		39,221	68.53	▼5.22
Registered electors		58,604		▲7.11
INC gain from Independent		Swing		

=== Assembly Election 1967 ===
1967 Haryana Legislative Assembly election: Kalka
Party	Candidate	Votes	%	±%
Independent	Lachhman Singh	12,787	32.39	New
INC	K. Lal	12,086	30.62	New
Independent	J. Singh	8,508	21.55	New
ABJS	P. Kumar	5,974	15.13	New
Independent	S. Singh	122	0.31	New
Margin of victory		701	1.78	
Turnout		39,477	75.32	New
Registered electors		54,716		
Independent win (new seat)				
