= Muzadpur =

Muzadpur Mujadpur
- Village
- Location in Haryana, India Muzadpur (India)
- Coordinates: 28°58′46″N 75°52′14″E
- Country: India
- State: Haryana
- District: Hisar

Government
  - Type: Local government
  - Body: Panchayat
- Elevation: 217 m (712 ft)

Languages
  - Official: Hindi
- Time zone: UTC+5:30 (IST)
- PIN: 125037
- Telephone code: +91-(01749)
- ISO 3166 code: IN-HR
- Vehicle registration: HR
- Sex ratio: 1000/870 ♂/♀
- Website: haryana.gov.in

Muzadpur, also spelled Mujadpur is a village in Hisar, Haryana, India.

== Location ==
Muzadpur is also called M.P city. Muzadpur is located next to Kanwari from the hisar. It is well connected by road to Kanwari, Hansi and Hisar. when travelling from hansi muzadpur is located next to Umra. while travelling from Tosham muzadpur is located next to Ratera.

Southwest of Muzadpur is desert, but the rest of the surrounding area is fertile plains. The fields are irrigated by the Sunder sub-branch extension of the Hansi-Butana branch of the Western Yamuna Canal.

In Muzadpur there is a well play ground for playing activity called Nimbal by the villagers. Games played by the villager is Football, Cricket, handball, kho-kho but Kabaddi is most favourable games in Muzadpur. Many players from Muzadpur played at National level sports meet.

== Transport ==
Muzadpur is connected to nearby villages through the road network with presence of State Transport Service and Private Bus Services which link it to Hisar, Hansi, Tosham and Bhiwani.

== Panchayat & Local Government ==
Muzadpur is an administrative unit and has a democratically elected panchayat samiti (local council) Sarpanch Smt. Sheela Devi W/O Sh. Bhim Singh (17/1/2016).

Currently, Muzadpur is under Hisar Zilla Panchayat Smiti & Hansi-I Intermediate panchayat, and has its own unreserved Gram Panchayat and census village code 00412900. As of July 2012, Dhup Singh Son of Sudhan Singh is the Sarpanch of the Kanwari Gram Panchayat

Muzadpur has been assigned to Hansi-I block of Hansi Tehsil in Hisar district under Hisar Division of Haryana state in India. Kanwari is under Hansi Vidhan Sabha and Hisar Lok Sabha constituency in Hisar District.

== Revenue, Agriculture, Health and Other Services ==
There is a Patwari (government land record officer), an ADO (Agriculture Development Officer), a Rural Health Officer (RHO), and an Anganwadi Worker based at Muzadpur.

Village also has a government school situated in South-East to the village.

== Demographics ==
In 2011 total population of Muzadpur 3,439.
