= Panchkula Assembly constituency =

Constituency of the Haryana legislative assembly in India

Coordinates: 30.71°N 76.86°E

- Constituency No. 2 for the Haryana Legislative Assembly

Constituency details
- Country: India
- Region: North India
- State: Haryana
- District: Panchkula
- Lok Sabha constituency: Ambala
- Established: 2009
- Total electors: 2,33,525
- Reservation: None

Member of Legislative Assembly
- 15th Haryana Legislative Assembly
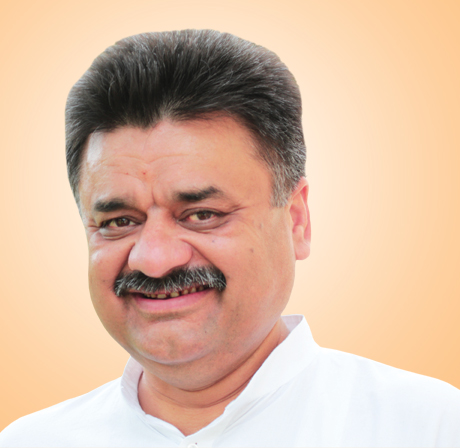
- Incumbent Chander Mohan
- Party: INC
- Elected year: 2024

Panchkula Assembly constituency is one of the 90 assembly seats of Haryana in the Panchkula district of Haryana, India. It is under Ambala (Lok Sabha constituency). It forms a part of a continuous area with the Union Territory of Chandigarh and the city of Mohali.

== Members of Legislative Assembly ==
Year	Member	Party
Till 2009: Constituency did not exist
2009	Devender Kumar Bansal	Indian National Congress
2014	Gian Chand Gupta	Bharatiya Janata Party
2019	Gian Chand Gupta	Bharatiya Janata Party
2024	Chander Mohan	Indian National Congress

== Election results ==
=== Assembly Election 2024 ===
2024 Haryana Legislative Assembly election: Panchkula
Party	Candidate	Votes	%	±%
INC	Chander Mohan	67,397	47.97	▲3.60
BJP	Gian Chand Gupta	65,400	46.55	▼2.29
AAP	Prem Garg	3,332	2.37	▲1.61
INLD	Dr Kshitij Choudhary	1,375	0.98	▼0.88
JJP	Sushil Garg	1,153	0.82	▲0.28
NOTA	None of the Above	987	0.70	▼0.25
Margin of victory		1,997	1.42	▼3.05
Turnout		1,40,502	59.49	▼0.47
Registered electors		2,33,525		▲12.39
INC gain from BJP		Swing	▼0.87	

=== Assembly Election 2019 ===
2019 Haryana Legislative Assembly election: Panchkula
Party	Candidate	Votes	%	±%
BJP	Gian Chand Gupta	61,537	48.84	▼5.45
INC	Chander Mohan	55,904	44.37	▲32.28
INLD	Karundeep Chaudhary	2,342	1.86	▼17.80
BSP	Roshan Lal Kocher	1,055	0.84	▼0.22
AAP	Yogeshwar Sharma	959	0.76	New
RJP	Manoj Kumar	765	0.61	New
JJP	Ajay Gautam	677	0.54	New
NOTA	None of the Above	1,195	0.95	▲0.12
Margin of victory		5,633	4.47	▼30.16
Turnout		1,25,999	59.96	▼5.76
Registered electors		2,10,149		▲7.23
BJP hold		Swing	▼5.45	

=== Assembly Election 2014 ===
2014 Haryana Legislative Assembly election: Panchkula
Party	Candidate	Votes	%	±%
BJP	Gian Chand Gupta	69,916	54.28	▲35.28
INLD	Kul Bhushan Goyal	25,314	19.65	▼0.81
INC	Devender Kumar Bansal	15,564	12.08	▼23.21
Independent	Vinod Bagai	7,545	5.86	New
HJC(BL)	Ravinder Rawal	3,778	2.93	▼12.69
BSP	Vishaw Deepak Sharma	1,363	1.06	▼2.78
Independent	Harender Singh	834	0.65	New
NOTA	None of the Above	1,073	0.83	New
Margin of victory		44,602	34.63	▲19.81
Turnout		1,28,796	65.72	▲8.27
Registered electors		1,95,971		▲36.11
BJP gain from INC		Swing	▲18.99	

=== Assembly Election 2009 ===
2009 Haryana Legislative Assembly election: Panchkula
Party	Candidate	Votes	%	±%
INC	Devender Kumar Bansal	29,192	35.29	
INLD	Yograj Singh	16,932	20.47	
BJP	Gian Chand Gupta	15,717	19.00	
HJC(BL)	Shashi Sharma	12,922	15.62	
BSP	Sanjeev Bhardwaj	3,177	3.84	
Independent	Harender Singh	1,168	1.41	
CPI(M)	Mehar Chand Goel	933	1.13	
Margin of victory		12,260	14.82	
Turnout		82,719	57.45	
Registered electors		1,43,985		
INC win (new seat)				
