= Chander Mohan =

Indian politician

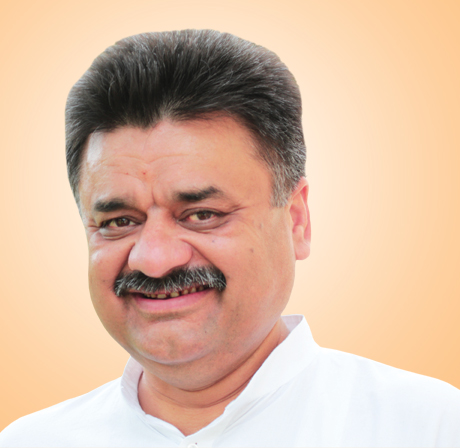

5th Deputy Chief Minister of Haryana
- In office 15 March 2005 – 7 December 2008
- Chief Minister: Bhupinder Singh Hooda
- Preceded by: Hukam Singh
- Succeeded by: Dushyant Chautala

Member of the Haryana Legislative Assembly
- Incumbent
- Assumed office 2024
- Preceded by: Gian Chand Gupta
- Constituency: Panchkula
- In office 1993 – 2009
- Preceded by: Purush Bhan
- Succeeded by: Pardeep Chaudhary
- Constituency: Kalka

Personal details
- Born: 13 September 1965 (age 60) Hisar, Punjab, India (now in Haryana, India)
- Party: Indian National Congress
- Other political affiliations: Haryana Janhit Congress
- Spouse(s): Smt. Seema, Fiza (Divorced)
- Children: Siddhrath Bishnoi; Damini Bishnoi
- Parent(s): Bhajan Lal (father); Jasma Devi (mother)

Chander Mohan Bishnoi is an Indian politician and former Deputy Chief Minister of Haryana. He is the elder son of former Chief Minister of Haryana Bhajanlal Bishnoi. He is currently a member of the Indian National Congress, while previously he was a member of Haryana Janhit Congress. He has been elected as a member of Haryana's legislative assembly consecutively 4 times from Kalka Constituency. He was elected from Panchkula Constituency in October 2024.

== Early life and education ==
Bishnoi was born in a political family of Haryana. His father Bhajan Lal was a former Chief minister of Haryana, while his younger brother, Kuldip Bishnoi is also a politician. Bishnoi was educated at the Lawrence School, Sanawar.

== See also ==
- Political families of Haryana
- Politics of Haryana
