= Nalwa Assembly constituency =

Haryana Legislature territory in India

Coordinates: 28.94°N 75.82°E

- Constituency No. 53 for the Haryana Legislative Assembly

Constituency details
- Country: India
- Region: North India
- State: Haryana
- District: Hisar
- Lok Sabha constituency: Hisar
- Established: 2009
- Total electors: 1,80,098
- Reservation: None

Member of Legislative Assembly
- 15th Haryana Legislative Assembly
- Incumbent Randhir Panihar
- Party: BJP
- Elected year: 2024

Nalwa Assembly constituency in Hisar district is one of the 90 Vidhan Sabha constituencies of Haryana state in northern India.

== History ==
Nalwa became a new Assembly constituency of Legislative Assembly of Haryana in the state of Haryana in the 2008 delimitation exercise. Earlier, most of the villages of this constituency were under Adampur, a stronghold of Bhajan Lal. Some of the villages were earlier with the Bawani Khera Constituency.

== Overview ==
Nalwa is part of Hisar Lok Sabha constituency along with eight other Assembly segments, namely, Uchana in Jind district and Adampur, Uklana, Narnaund, Hansi, Barwala, Hisar and Bawani Khera in Hisar district.

== Members of the Legislative Assembly ==
Year	Member	Party
Till 2009: Constituency did not exist
2009	Sampat Singh	Indian National Congress
2014	Ranbir Singh Gangwa	Indian National Lok Dal
2019	Ranbir Singh Gangwa	Bharatiya Janata Party
2024	Randhir Panihar	Bharatiya Janata Party

== Election results ==
=== Assembly Election 2024 ===
2024 Haryana Legislative Assembly election: Nalwa
Party	Candidate	Votes	%	±%
BJP	Randhir Panihar	66,330	51.20%	▲10.12
INC	Anil Maan	54,186	41.83%	▲9.10
JJP	Virender Chaudhary	3,891	3.00%	▼14.73
BSP	Sarwan Kumar Verma	2,611	2.02%	▼1.02
AAP	Umesh Sharma	1,193	0.92%	New
NOTA	None of the Above	507	0.39%	▼0.04
Margin of victory		12,144	9.37%	▲1.01
Turnout		1,29,546	71.82%	▲1.93
Registered electors		1,80,098		▲8.99
BJP hold		Swing	▲10.12	

=== Assembly Election 2019 ===
2019 Haryana Legislative Assembly election: Nalwa
Party	Candidate	Votes	%	±%
BJP	Ranbir Singh Gangwa	47,523	41.09%	▲29.97
INC	Randhir Panihar	37,851	32.72%	▲15.7
JJP	Virender Choudhary	20,516	17.74%	New
BSP	Advocate Bajrang Indal	3,510	3.03%	▲1.07
Independent	Randeep Lohchab	1,828	1.58%	New
INLD	Satpal Kajla	1,286	1.11%	▼34.57
Margin of victory		9,672	8.36%	▲2.31
Turnout		1,15,668	69.89%	▼7.31
Registered electors		1,65,498		▲8.67
BJP gain from INLD		Swing	▲5.41	

=== Assembly Election 2014 ===
Ranbir Singh Gangwa Prajapati of Indian National Lok Dal won the 2014 Haryana Legislative Assembly election on 19 October 2014. He is an ex-member of parliament and a senior leader of Indian national Lokdal party. He defeated ex finance minister and sitting MLA professor Sampat Singh and ex deputy chief minister of Haryana shri Chandermohan Bishnoi with a margin of 7100 votes.

2014 Haryana Legislative Assembly election: Nalwa
Party	Candidate	Votes	%	±%
INLD	Ranbir Singh Gangwa	41,950	35.68%	▲12.56
HJC(BL)	Chander Mohan	34,835	29.63%	▲0.74
INC	Sampat Singh	20,014	17.02%	▼23.42
BJP	Master Hari Singh	13,074	11.12%	▲9.91
BSP	Pardeep Ambedkar	2,313	1.97%	▼1.08
HLP	Jai Singh Bishnoi	1,210	1.03%	New
CPI(M)	Shankuntla Jakhar	962	0.82%	New
Margin of victory		7,115	6.05%	▼5.51
Turnout		1,17,582	77.20%	▼0.18
Registered electors		1,52,300		▲24.99
INLD gain from INC		Swing	▼4.77	

=== Assembly Election 2009 ===
Nalwa constituency was represented by an ex-minister of Haryana and senior Congress leader of the Haryana State Assembly, Professor Sampat Singh. He won the October 2009 elections with a margin of 10,901 votes, defeating Jasma Devi of the Haryana Janhit Congress. Jasma Devi is the wife of Bhajan Lal and this was the first defeat of the Bhajanlal clan in Haryana state politics. This defeat led to the downfall of Bhajanlal's Haryana Janhit Congress in literal terms for just after winning, five out of total six MLAs of Haryana Janhit Congress left the HJC and joined the Congress.

2009 Haryana Legislative Assembly election: Nalwa
Party	Candidate	Votes	%	±%
INC	Sampat Singh	38,138	40.45%	New
HJC(BL)	Jasma Devi	27,237	28.88%	New
INLD	Ranbir Singh Gangwa	21,799	23.12%	New
BSP	Gangadhar	2,877	3.05%	New
BJP	Madan Rawalwasia	1,144	1.21%	New
Margin of victory		10,901	11.56%	
Turnout		94,295	77.38%	
Registered electors		1,21,852		
INC win (new seat)				

== See also ==
- Nalwa
