= Government College, Nalwa =

College in Haryana, India

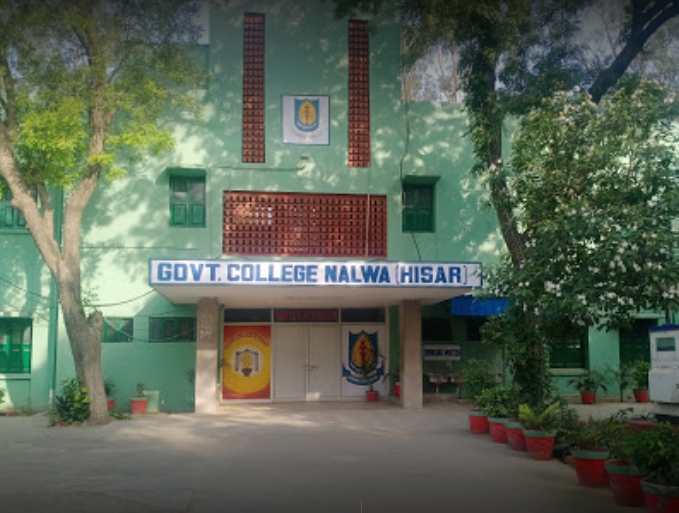
- Other names: GCN
- Type: Public
- Established: 1981
- Academic affiliations: Guru Jambheshwar University of Science and Technology
- Principal: Leena Kajal
- Location: Hisar district, Haryana, India; 28.5224°N 75.5454°E
- Campus: Rural, 5 acres (2.0 ha)
- Website: gcnalwa.ac.in/Home
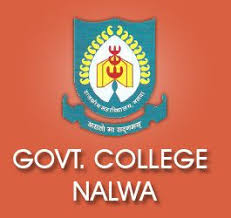

Government College, Nalwa is a public funded college located on Hisar-Tosham road in Nalwa village, 27 km from Hisar city of Hisar district, in the Indian state of Haryana. College is NAAC Accredited with B Grade.

According to the data maintained by the Government of India's Department of Statistics, the Government College, Nalwa was established in 1980 by Sh. Sita Ram, President of Jindal Trust.

== Courses ==
The college offers the following three courses:

- B.A.
- B.Sc. (Non medical)
- B. Com.

== Departments ==
- Department of Hindi
- Department of History
- Department of Economics
- Department of Mathematics
- Department of Psychology
- Department of commerce
- Department of Geography
- Department of Political Science
- Department OF Computer Science
- Department of Sanskrit

== See also ==
- Government Girl's High school (former co-ed Govt school)
- Government Senior Secondary Government school for Boys
- List of Universities and Colleges in Hisar
- List of schools in Hisar
- List of institutions of higher education in Haryana
