= Shakti Rani Sharma =

Indian politician

Member of the Haryana Legislative Assembly
- Incumbent
- Assumed office 8 October 2024
- Preceded by: Pardeep Chaudhary
- Constituency: Kalka

Personal details
- Party: Bharatiya Janata Party
- Spouse: Venod Sharma
- Children: Manu Sharma
- Profession: Politician

Shakti Rani Sharma is an Indian politician from Haryana. She is a Member of the Haryana Legislative Assembly from 2024, representing Kalka Assembly constituency as a Member of the Bharatiya Janata Party.. She is the mother of convicted criminal Manu Sharma.

== See also ==
- 2024 Haryana Legislative Assembly election
- Haryana Legislative Assembly
