= Venod Sharma =

Indian politician (born 1948)

Member of Punjab Legislative Assembly
- In office 1980–1985

Member of Parliament (Rajya Sabha)
- In office 10 April 1992 – 9 April 1998

Member of Legislative Assembly of Haryana
- In office 2005–2009
- In office 2009–2014

Personal details
- Born: 10 January 1948 (age 78)
- Party: Haryana Jan Chetna Party
- Other political affiliations: Indian National Congress
- Spouse: Shakti Rani Sharma
- Children: Manu Sharma; Shubham Sharma; Kartikeya Sharma
- Occupation: Politician
- Website: Official website

Venod Sharma (born 10 January 1948) is an Indian politician, father of Manu Sharma and the founder of the Jan Chetna Party. He was a student leader and associated with INC student outfit NSUI. His wife is a BJP MLA at present. He made it into the political mainstream when he was elected as MLA from Banur in the 1980 Punjab assembly election. In the next assembly elections he lost to Kanwaljit Singh. He was formerly a member of the Indian National Congress, which he represented as a Member of Legislative Assembly (1980) from Banur, Punjab then Member of Parliament in the Rajya Sabha (1992–1998) and as a Member of Legislative Assembly (2005–2014) from Ambala City, Haryana.

Sharma was associated with the Indian National Congress (INC) for 40 years.

According to MyNeta, he has 153 Crore worth of assets(properties, shares, bank deposits, cash etc.) with most sources unknown whether legally acquired or not.

In 1999, he resigned from the Indian National Congress during 1999 Indian general election after his son Manu Sharma was accused in the Jessica Lal murder case and he allegedly tried to bribe a witness. Sharma returned into Congress in 2004 and won the 2005 Haryana Legislative Assembly election from Ambala city. He was re-elected from the same constituency in 2009.

On 19 April 2014, Sharma was expelled from the Indian National Congress, for campaigning against it in the recent elections. On 2 May 2014, he resigned as a Member of the Haryana Legislative Assembly and on 23 June he founded his own political party, Haryana Jan Chetna Party (V). It was alleged that his decision to quit was motivated by a desire to protect his corporate interests.

Sharma and his wife, Shakti Rani Sharma, contested the 2014 Haryana state election and lost it to BJP candidates. There were allegations of Poll Code violations by Sharma during the elections.
