= Latika Sharma =

Indian politician

Latika Sharma is a member of the Haryana Legislative Assembly from the Bharatiya Janata Party representing the Kalka constituency in the 2014 Haryana Legislative Assembly election as a member of the Bharatiya Janata Party.
