= Aaj Samaj =

Newspaper

- Type: Daily newspaper
- Format: Broadsheet
- Publisher: iTV Network
- Editor: Amit Gupta
- Political alignment: Independent
- Language: Hindi
- Headquarters: Chandigarh, India
- Website: AajSamaaj.com

Aaj Samaj is a Hindi daily newspaper in India. The newspaper is managed by Good Morning India Media Private Limited Group.

== History ==
Aaj Samaj was founded in 2007 in New Delhi. In 2009, it added editions for Haryana, Chandigarh, Panchkula, and Mohali.
