= Balawas =

- Village
- Location in Haryana, India Balawas (India)
- Coordinates: 28°57′31″N 75°49′9″E
- Country: India
- State: Haryana
- District: Hisar

Government
  - Type: Local governance
  - Body: Panchayat

Languages
  - Official: Hindi
- Time zone: UTC+5:30 (IST)
- PIN: 125037
- Telephone code: 01663
- ISO 3166 code: IN-HR
- Vehicle registration: HR-20
- Sex ratio: 1000/870 ♂/♀
- Website: haryana.gov.in

Balawas is a village in Hisar-1 Rural Development Block, Nalwa Chaudhry (Vidhan Sabha constituency) and Hisar (Lok Sabha constituency) of Hisar District of Hisar Division in the Haryana state of India.

It is situated 168 kilometres (104 mi) from the national capital Delhi and 24 kilometres (15 mi) from the district headquarters Hisar on the Hisar-Tosham road.

== Description ==
Balawas is located at Hisar-Tosham road. People of all castes live in Balawas. Balawas village has government middle school. Main occupation of people is agriculture and government/private jobs. Balawas is connected to nearby villages through the road network with presence of State Transport Service and private bus services which link it to Hisar, Hansi, Tosham and Bhiwani.

== History ==
After Independence of India in 1947, it became part of Punjab. Once Haryana was formed as a separate state in 1966, it became part of the Hisar district, state of Haryana State.

== Transportation ==
=== Road ===
It is well-connected by the Matelled Asphalt (paved bitumen) road with Hisar (city) 24 km.

=== Train connectivity ===
The village does not have a rail station. The nearest major train stations accessible by road are 26 km (16 mi) at Hisar, 26 km (16 mi) at Hansi and 43 km at Bhiwani city.

=== Airport connectivity ===
Hisar Airport, the nearest functional airport and flying training club, is 26 km (16 mi) away. There are no commercial domestic or international flights from this airport. The nearest domestic and international airports are 200 km (120 mi) at Indira Gandhi International Airport at Delhi and 260 km (160 mi) Chandigarh International Airport.

== Revenue, agriculture, health and other services ==
There is a Patwari (Government Land Records Officer), an Agriculture Development Officer (ADO), a Rural Health Officer, and an Anganwadi (Community Childcare) worker based at village.

== Jan Sahayak e-governance services ==
Government of Haryana services are accessible via their Official website.

Government of India e-governance services can be availed online at their website for various govt departments including land & revenue (land rights and ownership records), transport (driving license and vehicle registration), health (birth and death certificates), public health (water and sewer connection), food (ration cards), power (electricity connection) and HUDA or Municipal Committee/council (house tax and building plans).

== See also ==
- Bidhwan
- Badya Jattan
- Badyan Brahmnan
- Kanwari
