= No One Killed Jessica =

2011 Indian film by Raj Kumar Gupta

- Theatrical release poster
- Directed by: Raj Kumar Gupta
- Written by: Raj Kumar Gupta
- Based on: Murder of Jessica Lal
- Produced by: Ronnie Screwvala
- Starring: Vidya Balan; Rani Mukerji
- Cinematography: Anay Goswamy
- Edited by: Aarti Bajaj
- Music by: Amit Trivedi
- Production company: UTV Spotboy
- Release date: 7 January 2011
- Running time: 136 minutes
- Country: India
- Language: Hindi
- Budget: ₹9 crore
- Box office: ₹45.72 crore

No One Killed Jessica is a 2011 Indian Hindi-language crime drama film written and directed by Raj Kumar Gupta. It stars Vidya Balan and Rani Mukerji. Based on the Jessica Lal murder case, the film revolves around a bartender who dies after being shot by a politician's son and her sister, Sabirina's struggle to find justice for her death.

Made on a budget of ₹9 crore (US$930,000), No One Killed Jessica was released theatrically on 7 January 2011. The film received widespread critical acclaim for its screenplay and cast performances and emerged as a sleeper hit, grossing ₹45.72 crore (US$4.7 million) approximately in its theatrical run. It was nominated for Best Film, Best Director (Gupta), and Best Actress (Balan) at the 57th Filmfare Awards, where it won Best Supporting Actress (Mukerji).

== Plot ==
Jessica, a bartender at an elite event in New Delhi, refuses to serve three men (Manish, Vishal, and Lucky) alcohol after the last call. Manish, the son of a politician, shoots her in the head in response. There are dozens of eyewitnesses, but as Jessica's sister, Sabrina, discovers, they are either conveniently forgetful or willing to sell their testimony to the highest bidder, leaving an open-and-shut case hostage to greed and political influence.

Manish is taken into custody by the police, and investigations begin. Inspector N. K. informs Sabrina that one of the two bullets that were sent for verification has been replaced. Sabrina's repeated attempts to get the witnesses and evidence in order to prove Jessica's crime fail one by one. The court case runs until 2006. Due to lack of evidence and witnesses, the court acquits the culprits. Sabrina's mother suffers a heart attack due to the trauma caused by the news and dies in the hospital.

Meanwhile, reporter Meera Gaity finds out about the acquittal through a newspaper. Having expected Jessica's case to be an open and shut case, Meera is shocked, takes the matter in her own hands, and plans to get justice for Jessica. With the approval of her editor, she performs various sting operations and exposes the failure of law and order in the country while raising questions about the police and the authorities. N. K. helps Meera by sending her the tape of Manish, where he confesses his crime. Meera uses the clip to publicly exploit the cases and starts to build up pressure on the system and Manish's father's political party.

Soon, the public, having followed the case on television, decides to protest against the cover-up by the powerful and bring justice to Jessica. A number of phone calls, SMS, and voice messages are sent through the channel in support for Jessica. Meera uses this public support to reach out to the government and the President for their help. A candlelight vigil march is organized for Jessica by the people of Delhi to stand for her and demand justice. Meanwhile, Sabrina, affected by all the trauma while fighting for her sister in court, has given up and moved on. Meera approaches Sabrina to stand up for her sister again and assures her that she would get justice this time as she has the support of the entire city.

Political pressure gets mounted on the family of Manish, and his father resigns from his position. The High Court summons the police for the recklessness they showed in the case. The police appealed to the High Court to have the case reopened, and it was accepted. The case is promoted to the Supreme Court, where Manish is found guilty and sentenced to life imprisonment. His allies, Vishal and Lucky, get punished with four years in jail.

== Cast ==
The cast is listed below:

- Vidya Balan as Sabrina Lal, Jessica Lal's Sister
- Rani Mukerji as Meera Gaity
- Yogendra Tiku as Sanjit Lal
- Satyadeep Mishra as Meera's boss
- Bubbles Sabharwal as Mallika Sehgal
- Geeta Sudan as June Lall
- Samara Chopra as Naina Sehgal
- Shireesh Sharma as Pramod Bharadwaj
- Myra Karn as Jessica Lal
- Vikas Bahl as Meera's colleague
- Raj Kumar Gupta as Meera's colleague
- Mohammed Zeeshan Ayyub as Manish P. Bharadwaj
- Rajesh Sharma as Inspector N. K.
- Neil Bhoopalam as Vikram Jai Singh
- Shammi Narang as Justice Jain
- Avijit Dutt as B. M. Pandit
- Karan Veer Mehra as Model at Meera’s house

== Production ==
No One Killed Jessica was Raj Kumar Gupta's second directorial venture after Aamir (2008). Gupta was inspired to address the Jessica Lal murder case for the film after he saw a Times of India's headline about the case, appearing shortly after the accused Manu Sharma released by the court in 2006. The next year, he met Jessica's sister, Sabrina, to ask some additional information about the case. Gupta said that he spent between seven and eight months to rewrite the film's story: "The material is very sensitive and I had to bring it in the realm of cinema. There was hesitation. Will I be able to do justice to the spirit of the story? I was not sure. Finally, I took it as a challenge. It's my interpretation of the events." The film was produced by Ronnie Screwvala under UTV Spotboy, a subsidiary of UTV Motion Pictures.

After Kareena Kapoor refused to play one of the lead role, in January 2010, Rani Mukerji and Vidya Balan were cast to replace her. Mukerji was cast as the stubborn reporter Meera Gaity. Her role was the only fictional aspect in the film, and according to her, Gupta asked her "to build the character on my own and not draw inspirations from anybody". Mukerji stated that Meera has "dynamic" and "modern" character, adding, "It wasn't something that I had ever done before. I actually had to play a man!" Meanwhile, Vidya played the role of Sabrina. She was required to wear men's clothing that was oversized and loose. She described Mukerji as her "favorite" co-star and spoke positively of her rapport with the actress. Myra Karn featured as Jessica in her film debut; she revealed that Gupta had been persuading her to play the part for one year before she accepted. Gautam Kishanchandani finished casting for the film in April 2010.

Produced on a budget of ₹90 million (US$930,000), No One Killed Jessica was filmed in 2-day schedules with Anay Goswamy as the cinematographer. Sabyasachi Mukherjee and Bibi Zeeba Miraie were the costume designers, and Ashley Lobo handed the choreography. While Sukant Panigrahy was the production designer, Helen Jones was the art director. Shooting took place at Netaji Subhash Chandra Bose International Airport, Ballygunge, Park Circus and New Market; as the crowds were hard to control, Gupta used hidden cameras to shoot scenes in these places. The filming was finished around July 2010, and Aarti Bajaj then edited the film.

== Soundtrack ==
The soundtrack for No One Killed Jessica was composed by Amit Trivedi and the lyrics were written by Amitabh Bhattacharya. It contains a total of six songs, with vocals performed by Aditi Singh Sharma, Anushka Manchanda, Bhattacharya, Biswajit Chakraborty, Joi Barua, Mame Khan, Meenal Jain, Raja Hasan, Raman Mahadevan, Robert Bob Omulo, Shilpa Rao, Shriram Iyer, Sonika Sharma, Sonu Kakkar, Tochi Raina, and Vishal Dadlani. The album was launched in the reality show Bigg Boss 4 on 17 December 2010.

== Release ==
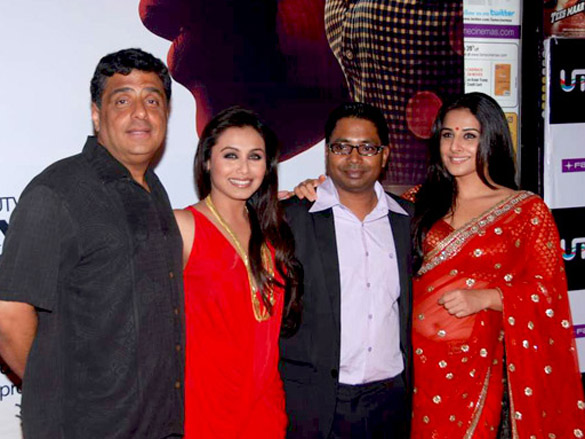
From left to right: Ronnie Screwvala, Rani Mukerji, Raj Kumar Gupta and Vidya Balan at the premiere of No One Killed Jessica

No One Killed Jessica was one of the most anticipated Indian films of 2011. The trailer, which was released on 18 November 2010, generated controversy as it featured Mukerji cursing, showing her middle finger and smoking. The Central Board of Film Certification (CBFC) and the Ministry of Health and Family Welfare then asked Gupta to censor all of the scenes. The film was later certified A (restricted to adults) on 23 December by the CBFC without any cuts being made. The film's commercial expectations were mixed. The trade analyst Komal Nahta predicted that the absence of a male lead would negatively impact its opening. Indo-Asian News Service, however, felt that the film has "chances ... [to] lure audiences as it is based on one of the most talked about murder cases in the country".

No One Killed Jessica was released on 7 January 2011 and emerged a commercial success and one of the highest-grossing Indian films of the year; the Indo-Asian News Service called it "the lucky mascot". It faced competition from Sachin P. Karande's thriller Vikalp, Gaurav Jain's animation film Ashoka: The Hero and Rahat Kazmi's romantic comedy Impatient Vivek. On its opening day, the film earned ₹32.5 million (US$340,000). Still, despite a strong opening, the film gradually lost public interest; after three days of running, its daily earnings decreased. No One Killed Jessica grossed a total grossing of ₹457.2 million (US$4.7 million), and the film-trade website Box Office India concluded the film's final commercial performance with the verdict "semi hit".

On 1 February 2011, No One Killed Jessica was released on DVD. On 20 March, the film and a retrospective of Vidya's films—including Lage Raho Munna Bhai (2006), Paa (2009) and Ishqiya (2010)—were screened at the Bollywood and Beyond festival in Australia. On 11 March 2017, it was available for streaming on Netflix and Amazon Prime Video.

== Critical reception ==
No One Killed Jessica received positive reviews from critics upon release, with praise directed towards its screenplay and Balan and Mukerji's performances. It received a rating of 80% on the review aggregator website Rotten Tomatoes based on ten reviews, with an average rating of 6.5 out of 10. Writing for the entertainment portal Bollywood Hungama, Taran Adarsh gave the film 4 stars out of 5. He wrote of Mukerji's performance, "In the role of a spirited and audacious journo, Mukerji, who smokes non-stop, flings swear words every now and then and who rebuffs being a voiceless spectator when the culprits go scot-free, is simply exceptional." The critic felt that Mukerji "sinks her teeth into the character, giving it the much required pragmatism that it necessitates". Nikhat Kazmi of The Times of India found Mukerji to be "impeccable" in the role, which Kazmi described as "the world-wise, hard-talking, foul-mouthed journalist", and Baradwaj Rangan appreciated her for playing against type. Komal Nahta opined, "Mukerji does a fine job, getting into the skin of the character of the feisty journalist who has no qualms about speaking her heart out and using swear words at the drop of a hat." Daily News and Analysis's Aniruddha Guha declared Mukerji's performance as "one of her best performances till date".

Anupama Chopra gave No One Killed Jessica 3 out of 5 stars, claiming that the film was "several notches ahead of the tripe we've been subjected to in theatres lately". However, she was critical of Mukerji's performance, arguing that "the character is written superficially and Rani's portrayal of her is equally banal." Sanjukta Sharma of Mint shared similar thoughts; she believed that Mukerji was "overloaded and overdetermined and she blusters through the role of the "bitch" who gets away with everything". Rajeev Masand calling the film a "full-on melodrama that doesn't always ring true". He compared it with Aamir, and found No One Killed Jessica to be "disappointing". However, Masand appreciated the leads' performances; Masand called Balan "plays her character one-note, and seems to forget to invest any personality into Sabrina", and similarly on Mukerji's performance, saying: "... [D]espite being saddled with a cliché of a character, is more cinematically engaging, and knows exactly how to command the screen with her presence."

Sudhish Kamath of The Hindu said, "No One Killed Jessica is a fine film undoubtedly, but does not quite match up to the potential it had after a gut-wrenching first half." A critic from The Indian Express complimented the film for its success "to sustain interest as it makes itself way towards the climactic moment when the culprit, despite the best efforts of his politician father and his fawning courtiers, is nabbed." Mayank Shekhar, in a three-out-of-five-star review published in the Hindustan Times, said that Vidya "stunningly natural". In a review for Rediff.com, Savera R. Someshwar singled out Vidya's "stand-out" performance, noting: "... [H]er hesitant body language, her faith, her helplessness, her rage, her sorrow and her gratitude all come across beautifully." Kaveree Bamzai of India Today added, "Balan is strong and steady, often startling with her quietude." However, Renuka Rao (also from Daily News and Analysis) was less impressed by the performance and considered her to be "insipid and somewhat forced".

Less positive views for No One Killed Jessica was given by overseas critics. Writing for The New York Times, Andy Webster found that Gupta "effectively recreate[d]" the Jessica Lal murder case "a milestone ... in the history of a new India". Zara Farooqui of the Newsline magazine gave a mixed review for the film; she called Mukerji's introduction "is way too long", while praising her "doe-eyed beauty". Lisa Tsering of The Hollywood Reporter believed that Mukerji's role is "the flashiest". While Gulf News referred to Vidya as "brilliance", Screen International found her performance to be overshadowed by Karn, who played a role the critic described as "bubbly, bold and somewhat uppity". Richard Kuipers of Variety took note of its production aspects; he wrote that Goswamy's "fluid [cinematography]" and Panigrahy's "richly textured decor, spanning high- and low-end life in New Delhi top an impressive tech package".

== Accolades ==
Award	Date of ceremony (Note: Date is linked to the article about the awards held that year, wherever possible.)	Category	Recipient(s) and nominee(s)	Result	Ref(s)
Anandalok Puraskar	1 December 2011	Best Actress – Hindi	Rani Mukerji	Won	
BIG Star Entertainment Awards	31 December 2011	Most Entertaining Social Film	No One Killed Jessica	Won	
BIG Star Entertainment Awards	31 December 2011	Most Entertaining Actor in a Social Role – Female	Rani Mukerji	Won	
BIG Star Entertainment Awards	31 December 2011	Most Entertaining Actor in a Social Role – Female	Vidya Balan	Nominated	
BIG Star Entertainment Awards	31 December 2011	Most Entertaining Film Actor – Female	Rani Mukerji	Nominated	
Filmfare Awards	29 January 2012	Best Film	No One Killed Jessica	Nominated	
Filmfare Awards	29 January 2012	Best Director	Raj Kumar Gupta	Nominated	
Filmfare Awards	29 January 2012	Best Actress	Vidya Balan	Nominated	
Filmfare Awards	29 January 2012	Best Supporting Actress	Rani Mukerji	Won	
International Indian Film Academy Awards	7–9 June 2012	Best Film	No One Killed Jessica	Nominated	
International Indian Film Academy Awards	7–9 June 2012	Best Director	Raj Kumar Gupta	Nominated	
Producers Guild Film Awards	25 January 2012	Best Film	No One Killed Jessica	Nominated	
Producers Guild Film Awards	25 January 2012	Best Director	Raj Kumar Gupta	Nominated	
Producers Guild Film Awards	25 January 2012	Best Actress in a Leading Role	Rani Mukerji	Nominated	
Producers Guild Film Awards	25 January 2012	Best Story	Raj Kumar Gupta	Nominated	
Producers Guild Film Awards	25 January 2012	Best Screenplay	Raj Kumar Gupta	Nominated	
Producers Guild Film Awards	25 January 2012	Best Editing	Aarti Bajaj	Won	
Producers Guild Film Awards	25 January 2012	Best Art Direction	Helen Jones	Nominated	
Producers Guild Film Awards	25 January 2012	Best Sound Design	Allwin Rego, Sanjay Maurya	Nominated	
Producers Guild Film Awards	25 January 2012	Best Sound Mixing	Alok De	Nominated	
Screen Awards	14 January 2012	Best Film	No One Killed Jessica	Nominated	
Screen Awards	14 January 2012	Best Director	Raj Kumar Gupta	Nominated	
Screen Awards	14 January 2012	Best Actress	Rani Mukerji	Nominated	
Screen Awards	14 January 2012	Best Actress	Vidya Balan	Nominated	
Screen Awards	14 January 2012	Best Supporting Actor	Rajesh Sharma	Nominated	
Screen Awards	14 January 2012	Best Background Music	Amit Trivedi	Nominated	
Screen Awards	14 January 2012	Best Screenplay	Raj Kumar Gupta	Nominated	
Screen Awards	14 January 2012	Best Editing	Aarti Bajaj	Nominated	
Screen Awards	14 January 2012	Best Sound Design	Allwin Rego, Sanjay Maurya	Nominated	
Stardust Awards	26 February 2012	Star of the Year – Female	Vidya Balan	Won (Note: Also for The Dirty Picture (2011).)	
Stardust Awards	26 February 2012	Best Actress – Drama	Vidya Balan	Won	
Stardust Awards	26 February 2012	Best Actress – Drama	Rani Mukerji	Nominated	
Stardust Awards	26 February 2012	New Musical Sensation – Female	Aditi Singh Sharma (for "Dilli")	Nominated	
