= Barwala Assembly constituency =

Constituency of the Haryana legislative assembly in India

Coordinates: 29.38°N 75.92°E

- Constituency No. 51 for the Haryana Legislative Assembly

Constituency details
- Country: India
- Region: North India
- State: Haryana
- District: Hisar
- Lok Sabha constituency: Hisar
- Established: 1967
- Total electors: 1,88,802
- Reservation: None

Member of Legislative Assembly
- 15th Haryana Legislative Assembly
- Incumbent Ranbir Singh Gangwa
- Party: BJP
- Elected year: 2024

Barwala Assembly constituency is one of the 90 Legislative Assembly constituencies of Haryana state in northern India.

Subedar Prabhu Singh from Bhiwani was the first MLA from Barwala in the election held in the year 1967. He defeated Sh Amar Singh by 6000 votes.

It is part of Hisar Lok Sabha constituency.

== Members of the Legislative Assembly ==
Year	Member	Party
1967	Subedar Prabhu Singh	Indian National Congress
1968	Gordhan Dass	Indian National Congress
1972	Pir Chand	Indian National Congress (O)
1977	Jai Narain	Janata Party
1982	Inder Singh Nain	Indian National Congress
1987	Surender Dhanda	Lokdal
1991	Joginder Singh Sheoran	Indian National Congress
1996	Relu Ram Punia	Independent
2000	Jai Parkash	Indian National Congress
2005	Randhir Singh Saharan	Indian National Congress
2009	Ram Niwas Ghorela	Indian National Congress
2014	Ved Narang	Indian National Lok Dal
2019	Jogi Ram Sihag	Jannayak Janta Party
2024	Ranbir Singh Gangwa	Bhartiya Janata Party

== Election results ==
=== Assembly Election 2024 ===
2024 Haryana Legislative Assembly election: Barwala
Party	Candidate	Votes	%	±%
BJP	Ranbir Singh Gangwa	66,843	47.72%	▲14.15
INC	Ramniwas Ghorela	39,901	28.48%	▲21.42
INLD	Sanjana Satroad	29,055	20.74%	New
AAP	Prof. Chhattar Pal Singh	2,543	1.82%	New
NOTA	None of the Above	430	0.31%	▼0.23
Margin of victory		26,942	19.23%	▲16.11
Turnout		1,40,087	74.08%	▲1.72
Registered electors		1,88,802		▲9.44
BJP gain from JJP		Swing	▲11.03	

=== Assembly Election 2019 ===
2019 Haryana Legislative Assembly election: Barwala
Party	Candidate	Votes	%	±%
JJP	Jogi Ram Sihag	45,868	36.69%	New
BJP	Surender Punia	41,960	33.56%	▲13.96
Independent	Ram Niwas Ghorela	17,471	13.97%	New
INC	Bhupender Gangwa	8,830	7.06%	▼10.75
BSP	Subhash Dhansu	3,768	3.01%	▲0.2
Independent	Satyavir Ladwa	2,083	1.67%	New
LSP	Mahavir Satrod	1,952	1.56%	New
Swaraj India	Anil Kumar Sharma Satrodia	720	0.58%	New
INLD	Raghuvinder Khokha	694	0.56%	▼27.19
NOTA	Nota	669	0.54%	New
Independent	Raghuvir Singh Advocate	632	0.51%	New
Margin of victory		3,908	3.13%	▼5.02
Turnout		1,25,026	72.36%	▼7.12
Registered electors		1,72,792		▲9.05
JJP gain from INLD		Swing	▲8.94	

=== Assembly Election 2014 ===
Ved Narang of Indian National Lok Dal won the 2014 Haryana Legislative Assembly election on 19 October 2014.

2014 Haryana Legislative Assembly election: Barwala
Party	Candidate	Votes	%	±%
INLD	Ved Narang	34,941	27.74%	▲5.92
BJP	Surender Punia	24,680	19.60%	▲15.51
HJC(BL)	Ramniwas Rara	24,436	19.40%	▼0.49
INC	Ram Niwas Ghorela	22,433	17.81%	▼13.96
Independent	Dr. Rajender Sura	10,118	8.03%	New
BSP	Sudama Baudh	3,547	2.82%	▼2.23
CPI(M)	Comrade Rajkumar	1,817	1.44%	▼0.15
Independent	Ashwani Kumar	698	0.55%	New
Margin of victory		10,261	8.15%	▼1.80
Turnout		1,25,941	79.48%	▲4.84
Registered electors		1,58,459		▲25.25
INLD gain from INC		Swing	▼4.03	

=== Assembly Election 2009 ===
2009 Haryana Legislative Assembly election: Barwala
Party	Candidate	Votes	%	±%
INC	Ram Niwas Ghorela	29,998	31.77%	▲0.2
INLD	Sheela Bhayan	20,602	21.82%	▼6.58
HJC(BL)	Subhash Tak	18,785	19.89%	New
Independent	Jogi Ram Sihag	11,122	11.78%	New
BSP	Balwan Singh Arya	4,768	5.05%	▲3.42
BJP	Jitender Jog	3,854	4.08%	▼0.75
CPI(M)	Comrade Suresh Kumar	1,504	1.59%	New
Rashtriya Arya Raj Sabha	Anant Ram	753	0.80%	New
Independent	Rajiv	586	0.62%	New
Margin of victory		9,396	9.95%	▲6.78
Turnout		94,422	74.63%	▼4.08
Registered electors		1,26,513		▼7.77
INC hold		Swing	▲0.20	

=== Assembly Election 2005 ===
2005 Haryana Legislative Assembly election: Barwala
Party	Candidate	Votes	%	±%
INC	Randhir	34,084	31.57%	▼10.11
INLD	Umed Singh Lohan	30,664	28.40%	▼6.75
Independent	Anant Ram	15,401	14.26%	New
Independent	Rajbir Sandhu	8,931	8.27%	New
Independent	Rajiv Raja	7,473	6.92%	New
BJP	Jitender Jog	5,214	4.83%	New
BSP	Rajinder Mathur Advocate	1,757	1.63%	▼0.42
Independent	Pardeep Citra	1,412	1.31%	New
Independent	Sarwan Kumar	678	0.63%	New
Independent	Randhir Dheera	568	0.53%	New
LJP	Vikram Singh	549	0.51%	New
Margin of victory		3,420	3.17%	▼3.36
Turnout		1,07,966	78.71%	▲3.46
Registered electors		1,37,170		▲14.75
INC hold		Swing	▼10.11	

=== Assembly Election 2000 ===
2000 Haryana Legislative Assembly election: Barwala
Party	Candidate	Votes	%	±%
INC	Jai Prakash	37,486	41.67%	▲33.23
INLD	Parmila Barwala	31,618	35.15%	New
Independent	Anant Ram	14,960	16.63%	New
HVP	Ravinder Singh	2,570	2.86%	▼19.51
BSP	Ved Singh	1,843	2.05%	▼7.11
Independent	Nathu Ram	1,279	1.42%	New
Margin of victory		5,868	6.52%	▼6.01
Turnout		89,949	76.03%	▲3.12
Registered electors		1,19,541		▲0.16
INC gain from Independent		Swing	▲6.77	

=== Assembly Election 1996 ===
1996 Haryana Legislative Assembly election: Barwala
Party	Candidate	Votes	%	±%
Independent	Relu Ram	30,046	34.91%	New
HVP	Anant Ram	19,257	22.37%	▲7.18
SAP	Surinder S/O Tikka Ram	16,865	19.59%	New
BSP	Nar Singh	7,880	9.15%	▲7.17
INC	Jai Narayan	7,271	8.45%	▼33.94
Independent	Partap S/O Jai Lal	699	0.81%	New
Independent	Balwan	519	0.60%	New
Margin of victory		10,789	12.53%	▼2.43
Turnout		86,079	74.58%	▲11.92
Registered electors		1,19,347		▲1.18
Independent gain from INC		Swing	▼7.48	

=== Assembly Election 1991 ===
1991 Haryana Legislative Assembly election: Barwala
Party	Candidate	Votes	%	±%
INC	Joginder Singh	30,099	42.38%	▲20.17
JD	Surender	19,474	27.42%	New
HVP	Inder Singh Nain	10,786	15.19%	New
BJP	Yogender Singh	5,401	7.61%	New
Independent	Dharmapal	1,619	2.28%	New
BSP	Prakash Rani	1,409	1.98%	New
Margin of victory		10,625	14.96%	▼25.11
Turnout		71,016	62.22%	▼12.20
Registered electors		1,17,959		▲18.68
INC gain from LKD		Swing	▼19.90	

=== Assembly Election 1987 ===
1987 Haryana Legislative Assembly election: Barwala
Party	Candidate	Votes	%	±%
LKD	Surender	44,823	62.28%	▲44.37
INC	Inder Singh Nain	15,986	22.21%	▼12.25
Independent	Jagdish	7,762	10.79%	New
Independent	Maman Chand	1,813	2.52%	New
Independent	Ram Babu	432	0.60%	New
Independent	Kashmir Singh	302	0.42%	New
Margin of victory		28,837	40.07%	▲30.26
Turnout		71,969	73.27%	▲0.73
Registered electors		99,393		▲24.21
LKD gain from INC		Swing	▲27.82	

=== Assembly Election 1982 ===
1982 Haryana Legislative Assembly election: Barwala
Party	Candidate	Votes	%	±%
INC	Inder Singh Nain	19,766	34.46%	▲27.21
Independent	Joginder Singh	14,141	24.65%	New
LKD	Jai Narain Verma	10,272	17.91%	New
Independent	Surender	9,016	15.72%	New
Independent	Krishan Singh	2,003	3.49%	New
Independent	Bhim	636	1.11%	New
Independent	Ram Kumar	423	0.74%	New
Independent	Chandgi	367	0.64%	New
Independent	Chet Ram	314	0.55%	New
Margin of victory		5,625	9.81%	▼6.96
Turnout		57,358	73.11%	▲3.91
Registered electors		80,022		▲18.10
INC gain from JP		Swing	▼2.25	

=== Assembly Election 1977 ===
1977 Haryana Legislative Assembly election: Barwala
Party	Candidate	Votes	%	±%
JP	Jai Narain	16,857	36.71%	New
Independent	Thandi Ram	9,158	19.94%	New
Independent	Joginder Singh	5,733	12.49%	New
Independent	Prabhu Dayal	4,472	9.74%	New
INC	Inder Singh	3,329	7.25%	▼36.22
Independent	Jamna Singh	1,522	3.31%	New
Independent	Dhoop Singh	1,515	3.30%	New
Independent	Sukhbir Singh	1,419	3.09%	New
Independent	Data Ram	942	2.05%	New
Independent	Sadanand	479	1.04%	New
Independent	Kuljit Singh	372	0.81%	New
Margin of victory		7,699	16.77%	▲13.51
Turnout		45,917	68.77%	▼0.96
Registered electors		67,759		▲5.32
JP gain from INC(O)		Swing	▼10.01	

=== Assembly Election 1972 ===
1972 Haryana Legislative Assembly election: Barwala
Party	Candidate	Votes	%	±%
INC(O)	Pir Chand	20,659	46.72%	New
INC	Neki Ram	19,219	43.47%	▼2.43
Independent	Chhabil Dass	3,174	7.18%	New
RPI	Savitri	909	2.06%	New
SSP	Gaje Singh	255	0.58%	New
Margin of victory		1,440	3.26%	▲1.54
Turnout		44,216	70.74%	▲29.58
Registered electors		64,335		▲16.52
INC(O) gain from INC		Swing	▲0.83	

=== Assembly Election 1968 ===
1968 Haryana Legislative Assembly election: Barwala
Party	Candidate	Votes	%	±%
INC	Gordhan Dass	9,919	45.89%	▼7.85
BKD	Pir Chand	9,548	44.18%	New
SWA	Chhabil Dass	2,146	9.93%	New
Margin of victory		371	1.72%	▼15.84
Turnout		21,613	39.99%	▼29.27
Registered electors		55,212		▲1.84
INC hold		Swing		

=== Assembly Election 1967 ===
1967 Haryana Legislative Assembly election: Barwala
Party	Candidate	Votes	%	±%
INC	Subedar Prabhu Singh	19,936	53.75%	New
SSP	A. Singh	13,423	36.19%	New
Independent	S. Dass	2,690	7.25%	New
Independent	K. Singh	723	1.95%	New
Independent	S. Ram	321	0.87%	New
Margin of victory		6,513	17.56%	
Turnout		37,093	71.43%	
Registered electors		54,215		
INC win (new seat)				

== See also ==
- Haryana Legislative Assembly
- Elections in Haryana
- Elections in India
- Lok Sabha
- Rajya Sabha
- Election Commission of India
