= Murder of Jessica Lal =

1999 celebrity murder in India

Jessica Lall
- Born: 5 January 1965; India
- Died: 30 April 1999 (aged 34); New Delhi
- Cause of death: Gunshot wound to the head
- Occupation: Model

Jessica Lal (5 January 1965 – 30 April 1999) was a model in New Delhi who was working as a celebrity barmaid at a crowded socialite party when she was shot dead at around 2:00 am on 30 April 1999. Dozens of witnesses pointed to Siddharth Vashisht, also known as Manu Sharma, the son of Venod Sharma, a wealthy and influential Member of Parliament from Haryana, as the murderer. Manu Sharma was later convicted for the murder and sentenced to life.

In the first trial, Manu Sharma was acquitted, leading to a huge uproar in the country, despite strong circumstantial evidence to convict the accused, questioning the acquittal, claiming it was not based on merit. Following intense media and public pressure, the prosecution appealed and the Delhi High Court conducted proceedings on a fast track with daily hearings conducted over 25 days. The trial court judgment was overturned, and Manu Sharma was found guilty of having murdered Lal. He was sentenced to life imprisonment on 20 December 2006. On 2 June 2020 Manu Sharma was released from Tihar Jail by Delhi LG on grounds of good behavior.

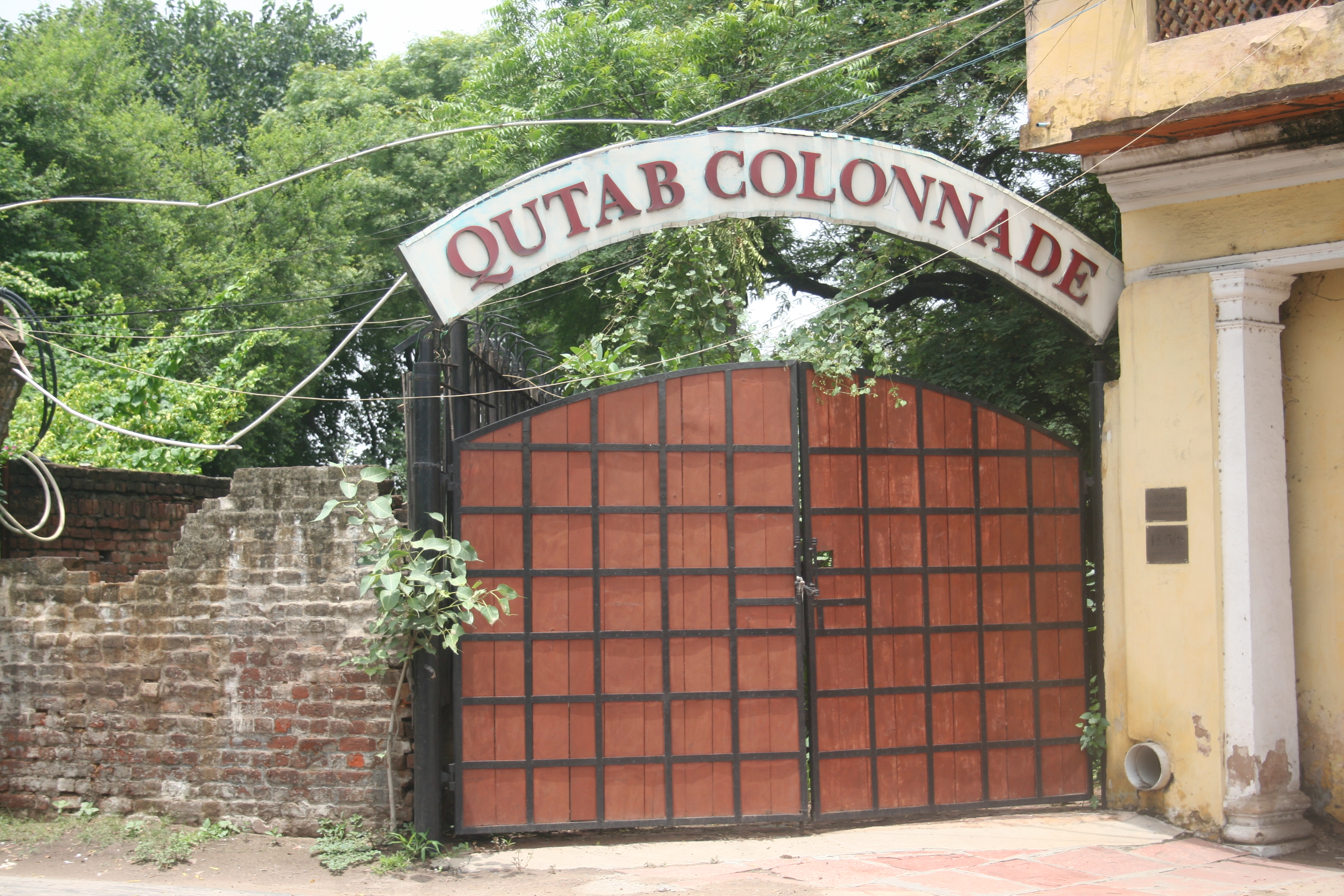
Qutab Colonnade Restaurant where murder took place

== Murder ==
On 29 April 1999, Lal was one of several models working at an unlicensed bar at a party in a restaurant overlooking the Qutub Minar in Mehrauli. The bar ran out of liquor at midnight which it only served till 12.30 am. After midnight, Manu Sharma walked in with three friends and demanded to be served liquor, offering ₹ 1000 for it. Lal refused to do so and Sharma then fired a .22 caliber pistol at the ceiling as an intimidatory act. Lal refused again, after which Sharma shot Lal in the head, killing her.

Due to confusion, a fight followed the shooting, during which Sharma and his friends — Amardeep Singh Gill, Vikas Yadav, and Alok Khanna — left the scene.

== Arrests ==
Soon after the shooting, contact could not be made with Sharma's family and the family was absconding. After eluding police for a few days Khanna and Gill were arrested on 4th May and Sharma on 6 May with the assistance of accomplices. The murder weapon was not recovered and was thought to have been passed on to a friend who had been visiting from the US and who may subsequently have returned there.

The case by now involved several prominent people. Manu Sharma himself was the son of Venod Sharma, an Indian National Congress member, who subsequently resigned from I.N.C. Yadav was the son of state politician, D. P. Yadav. Bina Ramani was a socialite and fashion designer who had redeveloped the premises of the shooting. Her daughter Malini Ramani knew Lal as a fellow-model. Singh managed the distribution of Maaza in Chandigarh.

Amit Jhigan, an accomplice of Sharma, was arrested on 8 May and charged with conspiring to destroy evidence, as it was believed that he had retrieved the pistol from its original hiding place near the bar. While he was remanded in custody, Yadav was still at large and it had also proved impossible to locate his father, who had promised to deliver his son to the police.

Ramani, her husband, and her daughter Malini were arrested on the same day as Jhigan. They were charged with operating an illegal bar and, although released on bail, had to surrender their passports. There were several lines of inquiry regarding the family, including whether or not Ramani — a UK national — had the necessary permits to operate a business in India. Another concern was to establish whether or not she had concealed evidence by ordering the cleaning up of blood at the premises, although by 19 May it had been announced that charges relating to this alleged destruction of evidence could not be brought.

Yadav was able to obtain anticipatory bail and presented himself to Delhi Police on 19 May without arrest. He claimed to have been in Mumbai and elsewhere during the previous few weeks, and refused to comment regarding whether he had been in contact with his father. He admitted that Sharma had stayed with him on the night of the murder but denied being present himself at the Tamarind Club or having any knowledge of the events that had occurred there until the next day, when he told Sharma to surrender to the police.

Subsequently, he had short spells in custody and longer periods when he was freed on bail, with decisions and overturnings of them being made in various court hearings.

== First trial ==
Charge sheets were filed with the court on 3 August 1999. Sharma was charged with murder, destruction of evidence and other offences, while Khanna, Gill and Yadav faced lesser charges, including destruction of evidence, conspiracy and harbouring a suspect. Others similarly charged were Shyam Sunder Sharma, Amit Jhingan, Yograj Singh, Harvinder Chopra, Vikas Gill, Raja Chopra, Ravinder Krishan Sudan and Dhanraj. The last three named had not yet been apprehended.

Seven years after the case was opened, on 21 February 2006, nine of the twelve accused were acquitted, including Sharma. Jhingan had already been discharged and both Ravinder Kishan Sudan and Dhanraj, were still at large. The prosecution had been affected by 32 of their witnesses becoming "hostile". These included Shayan Munshi, Andleeb Sehgal, Karan Rajput, Shiv Lal Yadav and two ballistics experts, Roop Singh and Prem Sagar. In February 2011, it was announced that all 32 would be facing charges of perjury.

The trial judge commented after the outcome that

The court has acquitted them because the Delhi police failed to sustain the grounds on which they had built up their case. The police failed to recover the weapon which was used to fire at Jessica Lal as well as prove their theory that the two cartridges, emptied shells of which were recovered from the spot, were fired from one weapon.

The Hindu newspaper also reported that the judge was aware that the prosecution was not assisted by the hostility of their witnesses, three of whom had seen the shooting, and by the fact that forensic examination contradicted police claims that two cartridges found at the scene were fired from the same weapon. Finally, the judge believed that the police had failed to provide a sufficient explanation of the chain of events which led up to the killing.

== Reaction to acquittal ==
The reaction to the verdict was one of outcry. The New York Times described the situation a fortnight later

Most noticeably among India's urban middle class, the acquittal has released a pent-up frustration with an often blundering and corrupt law enforcement bureaucracy and a deep disgust with the rich and famous who, by all appearances, manipulated it to their advantage.

There were numerous protest campaigns, including ones involving SMS and email, seeking to obtain redress for the perceived miscarriage of justice. Rallies and marches took place, as well as candlelit vigils. The protests and candle light vigils were led by Prabhloch Singh, the founder of an organization called the "Middle Finger Protests", also known as "Human Rights Protection Group" from Manu Sharma's hometown Chandigarh. V. N. Khare, a former Chief Justice of India, implicitly criticized the trial judge, saying that it should have been an "open and shut" case and that

Sometimes when the police, the prosecution and the lawyers all have connections with the criminals, the judge should be slightly proactive. He should try to get to the truth, and not depend totally on the evidence provided in court. In a case like this, he is not going to get proper evidence. Mostly the judiciary is depended on the evidence provided by the investigative agencies, but now when the situation is so bad, the judges have to wake up, be proactive and find the truth.

The Delhi police commissioner announced an investigation to determine where things had gone wrong, and said that among other things it would examine whether there had been a conspiracy, including possibly by tampering with the evidence.

== Appeal and conviction in High Court ==
The police petitioned the High Court for a review of the case and on 22 March 2006 the court issued warrants against the nine defendants who had stood trial. Eight of them were subsequently bailed in April, with restrictions imposed on their ability to leave the country. The ninth defendant, Gill, had not been traced since the original issue of warrants in March.

On 9 September 2006, a sting operation by the news magazine Tehelka was shown on the TV channel ABP News. This appeared to show that witnesses had been bribed and coerced into retracting their initial testimony. Venod Sharma was named in the exposé as one who had paid money to some of the witnesses. Facing pressure from the central Congress leaders, Venod Sharma resigned from the Haryana cabinet.

=== Judgment ===
On 15 December 2006, the High Court ruled that Sharma was guilty based on existing evidence, and also criticized the trial judge, S. L. Bhayana.

The judgment said that the lower court had been lax in not considering the testimony of witnesses such as Bina Ramani and Deepak Bhojwani, stating regarding the treatment of the latter's evidence that, "With very great respect to the learned judge [Bhayana], we point out that this manner of testing the credibility of the witness is hardly a rule of appreciation of evidence. ... Obviously, this reflects total lack of application of mind and suggests a hasty approach towards securing a particular end, namely the acquittal."

In particular, the key witness Munshi came in for serious criticism. The judgment says, of his earlier repudiation of the FIR that "[Munshi] is now claiming that the said statement was recorded in Hindi while he had narrated the whole story in English as he did not know Hindi at all ... We do not find this explanation of Munshi to be convincing." Regarding Munshi's testimony that two guns were involved, the judgment says: "In court he has taken a somersault and came out with a version that there were two gentlemen at the bar counter. ... [W]e have no manner of doubt that on this aspect he is telling a complete lie."

On 20 December 2006, Sharma was sentenced to life imprisonment and a fine. The other accused, Yadav and Gill, were fined and given four years' rigorous imprisonment. A plea for Sharma to be sentenced to death was rejected on the grounds that the murder, although intentional, was not premeditated and Sharma was not considered to be a threat to society.

Sharma's lawyer announced that the decision would be appealed in Supreme Court because the judgment was wrong in holding Bina Ramani to be a witness.

=== Parole for Sharma ===
On 24 September 2009, the government in Delhi paroled Sharma for a 30-day period so that he could attend to some matters relating to his sick mother and the family business. The parole was further extended by 30 days, during which he was seen partying in a night-club and his mother appeared at public functions. Sharma returned himself to Tihar Jail on 10 November 2009, two weeks before his parole expired.

Sharma was granted a limited parole from 28 December 2013 to 5 January 2014. This was to allow him to sit for master's degree examinations in Delhi.

=== Release ===
The Delhi Sentence Review Board recommended his premature release from his life sentence. In 2018, Sabrina Lall sister of Jessical Lall, had already informed the jail authorities of her having no objection to his release. In 2020 Sharma was out on bail because of the order of Delhi's LG on the grounds of good behavior. After release, Sharma changed his name to Siddharth Sharma, and is now listed as the founder of Piccadily Distilleries, which also owns Indri whisky. Meanwhile, Sabrina Lall who pursued relentlessly for justice of her sister Jessica, died in 2021, after a prolonged illness.

=== Supreme Court confirmation of sentences ===
On 19 April 2010, the Supreme Court of India approved the sentences and said that

The evidence regarding the actual incident, the testimonies of witnesses, the evidence connecting the vehicles and cartridges to the accused — Manu Sharma, as well as his conduct after the incident, prove his guilt beyond reasonable doubt. The High Court has analysed all the evidence and arrived at the correct conclusion.

Former Solicitor General of India, Gopal Subramanium arguing on behalf of the prosecution quoted Chandra Mohan Tiwari vs. State of M.P., (1992) 2 SCC 105 and Jaswant Singh vs. State of Haryana, (2000) 4 SCC 484 to establish his case. Senior advocate Ram Jethmalani, who represented Sharma in the Supreme Court, assailed the High Court verdict, alleging that the media had prejudged the issue and conducted a campaign to vilify his client. The Supreme Court accepted that there had been an element of "trial by media" but believed that it had not affected the decision of the High Court. The judges who maintained the Delhi High Court judgement pronounced by Justice R.S. Sodhi, were Justice P. Sathasivam and Justice Swatanter Kumar.

== Perjury charges ==
In May 2013, the Delhi High Court ordered the prosecution of Bollywood actor Shayan Munshi and a ballistic expert, P. S. Manocha, for turning hostile. The court cleared a further 17 people whose allegedly hostile position was under review. Ten other people had been discharged from claims of perjury in earlier hearings, and three had died since the original trial.

== In popular culture ==
No One Killed Jessica, a 2011 Hindi film starring Rani Mukherjee and Vidya Balan, was inspired by the incident and on Sabrina Lall's fight for justice for her sister. Six Suspects, a 2016 novel by Vikas Swarup centred on a similar murder.

== See also ==
- Law of India
- Ram Jethmalani, Indian lawyer and Manu Sharma's defence counsel
