= Manu Sharma =

Indian convicted murderer (born 1977)

- Born: 1977 (age 48–49)
- Other name: Siddharth Sharma
- Occupation: Self employed
- Employer: Siddhartha Vashishta Charitable Trust
- Spouse: Preity Sharma (m. 2015)
- Parent: Venod Sharma (father)
- Relatives: Kartikeya Sharma (brother)

Manu Sharma (born 1977), currently known as Siddharth Sharma is an Indian convicted murderer who was imprisoned for the 1999 murder of Jessica Lal. He was released in June 2020 on grounds of good behaviour. Sharma is the son of the former Indian National Congress leader, Venod Sharma, and the brother of media baron, Kartikeya Sharma. Shakti Rani Sharma, a Bharatiya Janata Party leader and Member of the Haryana Legislative Assembly, is mother of Manu Sharma.

Sharma is one of several high-profile criminals brought to trial in India through media activism, with his conviction among those viewed as demonstrating the impact of the general public in correcting imbalances in the Indian legal process.

He has changed his name and now his official name is Siddharth Sharma. He is behind the brand that manufactures Indri whisky. Ironically, the whiskey has the red bindi same as the victim Jessica Lall

== Personal life ==
Sharma was born in 1977. His father was a member of parliament in the Rajya Sabha during the 1990s, elected on an Indian National Congress ticket. He was later elected to the Haryana legislature. His uncle is the son-in-law of former President of India, Shankar Dayal Sharma.

Sharma has asthma. He completed two years of undergraduate courses in Commerce at a college in Chandigarh.

On 22 April 2015, Sharma married Preity Sharma, a Mumbai based model. The marriage was delayed due to Sharma's conviction.

== Murder and conviction ==
In the late 1990s, Sharma was known to be a regular party-goer in Delhi. On 29 April 1999, he was present at a party where an unlicensed bar was operating. Jessica Lal refused to serve him, despite being offered 1000 rupees, and Sharma then fired a .22 pistol and killed her. Sharma was arrested and charged with murder, destruction of evidence and other offences. During the trial, 32 witnesses turned "hostile". Seven years after the case was opened, on 21 February 2006, Sharma and eight others of the twelve accused were acquitted. The trial judge commented after the outcome that:

The court has acquitted them because the Delhi police failed to sustain the grounds on which they had built up their case. The police failed to recover the weapon which was used to fire at Jessica Lal as well as prove their theory that the two cartridges, emptied shells of which were recovered from the spot, were fired from one weapon.

After his acquittal by the trial court, Sharma was ostracized with SMS campaigns being sent out to boycott all establishments owned by the Sharma family. The acquittal led to widespread public outcry. In March 2006, the case was re-admitted in the Delhi High Court where it was tried on a fast-track basis. Among the evidence re-introduced were two spent cartridges recovered from Sharma's car; the ballistic analysis for one of which showed it as matching the bullet recovered from Lal's skull. This evidence had been overlooked by the trial court. On 18 December 2006, the High Court ruled Sharma guilty of murdering Jessica Lal and sentenced him to life imprisonment. After conviction, he was imprisoned in the Tihar Jail. Sharma appealed to the Supreme Court of India through his counsel Ram Jethmalani. However, the court upheld his sentence of life imprisonment on 19 April 2010.

== Aftermath ==
Sharma was incarcerated in the Tihar Jail along with co-accused Vikas Yadav and Amardeep Singh Gill, who had been sentenced for destroying the evidence. Along with another high-profile convict, Santosh Kumar Singh, Sharma was involved in helping other prisoners draft legal appeals.

On 24 September 2009, the Delhi Lieutenant Governor granted Sharma 30-day parole from jail on the grounds that he needed to attend to his ailing mother, attend the last rites of his grandmother, and also look after the family business which was suffering in his absence. It was later revealed that the parole was granted despite an objection from the Delhi police.

In November 2009, Chief Minister Sheila Dikshit came under criticism for granting parole to Sharma after media reports of him visiting night clubs in Delhi emerged. During the parole, he got involved in a brawl with the son of police commissioner of Delhi. After a public uproar that he violated parole norms, the Delhi Government had to cancel his parole and on 10 November 2009, Sharma returned to Tihar Jail.

Sharma established the Siddhartha Vashishta Charitable Trust during imprisonment. It is managed by his mother and brother. According to The Times of India, the Trust is intended to assist causes such as" child education, cancer awareness, [and] rehabilitation of prisoners etc." By July 2011, it had provided assistance to at least 130 children of prison inmates.

Sharma was granted five days' parole in November 2011 to attend the wedding of his younger brother. The parole restricted his movements to the cities of Karnal, Chandigarh, and Ambala, and prevented him from visiting any night club. Sharma was granted nine days parole in December 2013 and 30 days on 26 December 2014 to appear for his master's degree exams.

Considering his good conduct, Sharma was moved to an "open jail" in November 2017 where he was allowed to leave prison everyday and return in evening.

On 2018, Sabrina Lal, the only surviving family member of Jessica Lal said in a letter to the welfare office of Tihar jail that she had no objection to the release of Manu Sharma as he had spent 15 years in prison. On 2 June 2020, Delhi Lieutenant Governor allowed the release of Sharma after a recommendation by the Sentence Review Board (SRB). The decision was taken by SRB on 13 May 2020 under the chairmanship of Delhi Home Minister, Satyendra Jain. His sentence was supposed to end on 6 May 2023.

Sharma was released from imprisonment in June 2020. After his release Manu Sharma expressed regret in an interview to The Times of India for killing Jessica Lal.

After release, he is involved in Indri whisky.

== In media ==
- No One Killed Jessica, a 2011 Indian political crime thriller film directed by Rajkumar Gupta starring Vidya Balan and Rani Mukerji, based on the Murder of Jessica Lal case.
