= Ranbir Singh Gangwa =

Indian politician (born 1964)

Cabinet Minister, Government of Haryana
- Incumbent
- Assumed office 17 October 2024
- Governor: Bandaru Dattatraya
- Chief Minister: Nayab Singh Saini
- Ministry and Departments: Public Health Engineering; Public Works (Building & Roads)

Member of Haryana Legislative Assembly
- Incumbent
- Assumed office 8 October 2024
- Preceded by: Sitaram Yadav
- Constituency: Barwala Assembly constituency

Deputy Speaker of the Haryana Legislative Assembly
- In office 4 November 2019 – 17 October 2024
- Speaker: Gian Chand Gupta
- Succeeded by: Krishan Lal Middha
- Constituency: Nalwa (Vidhan Sabha constituency)

Personal details
- Born: 4 March 1964 (age 62) Gangwa, Haryana, India
- Party: Bharatiya Janata Party
- Spouse: Angoori Devi
- Children: 2
- Profession: Politician

Ranbir Singh Gangwa Prajapati (born 4 March 1964) is an Indian politician. He was a member of Rajya Sabha from Indian National Lok Dal party from 2010 to 2014. He was elected as a member of Haryana Legislative Assembly in 2014 after beating sitting MLA and then minister Sampat Singh and Chander Mohan s/o former chief minister Bhajan Lal. Then he won in 2019 from Nalwa Chaudhry (Vidhan Sabha constituency) in Hisar (city) and in 2024 from Barwala Assembly constituency. He had joined Bharatiya Janata Party just before 2019 Indian general election.

== Biography ==
Ranbir Singh Gangwa was born on 4 March 1964 in village Gangwa, Hisar district. His father's name was Rajaram and mother's name is Kesar Devi. His wife is Angoori Devi with whom he got married at very early age. Together they have two sons.
