= East Coast Economic Corridor =

India's first coastal economic corridor

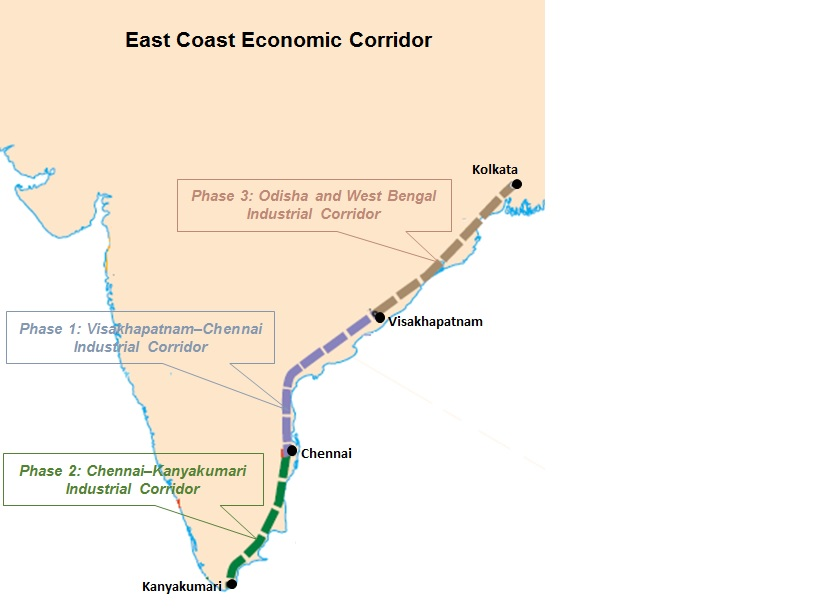
Map showing the plans for the East Coast Economic Corridor

The East Coast Economic Corridor (ECEC) is India’s first coastal economic corridor, covering 2500 km of India's coastline, to be developed with the help of the Asian Development Bank (ADB). The ADB is to invest $500 million in infrastructural development of the project. Since late 2013, ADB has been supporting studies on transport corridors in India. Phase 1 of the ECEC is Visakhapatnam-Chennai Industrial Corridor (VCIC) which had been approved by the ADB board in October 2016. The ECEC running along the entire east coast of India from Kolkata to Kanyakumari, is a multimodal, regional maritime corridor that can play a vital role in unifying the large domestic market, as well as integrating the Indian economy with the dynamic global value chains of Southeast and East Asia. It would play a crucial role in the Government of India’s (GoI) Make in India campaign and also supports the port-led industrialization strategy under the Sagar Mala initiative and the Act East Policy by linking domestic companies with the vibrant global production networks of East and Southeast Asia.

ECEC stretches about 2,500 kilometers along India's eastern coast—from Kolkata in the north to Kanyakumari in the south—traversing the four states of West Bengal, Odisha, Andhra Pradesh and Tamil Nadu.

ECEC encompasses several centers of economic activity, covering not only the resource-rich but also the poorest regions. Linking the lagging regions with the growing and well-established industrial clusters will help create job opportunities for the poor. To stimulate economic activities in other emerging clusters and distribute growth within the region, efficient multi-modal transport is necessary. The presence of a strong information and communication technology (ICT) industry in Kolkata, Visakhapatnam, Hyderabad, and Chennai can also lend support to ECEC’s communications network; provide a platform for skills development in other related service sectors; and facilitate implementation of e-governance systems for maintenance, monitoring, and evaluation of corridor development activities.

It connects to Raipur–Visakhapatnam Economic Corridor at Visakhapatnam.

== Background ==
India has experienced a rapid structural transformation and strong economic growth in recent decades. It has emerged as one of the fastest-growing economies in the world amid the current global economic slowdown. With a demographic dividend ushering in tremendous economic gains, a huge domestic market, and substantial opportunities for integration with the global economy, India has the potential to move to a higher growth trajectory. To sustain this momentum, it must continue to create economic opportunities for its large labor force, which is increasing by about 12 million a year. One pressing policy challenge is to create more productive and well-paying jobs in the manufacturing sector, which contributes about 17% to gross domestic product (GDP) versus 21-29% in East and Southeast Asia. India also has limited participation in GVCs with a GVC Participation Index of 43% in 2011, lower than its peers in Asia including South Korea (62%), Malaysia (60%), and, People’s Republic of China (48%).

To continue on a sustainable growth path, India would require greater investment in infrastructure, regulatory reforms, skills development and technological modernization, and innovation in financing. The underlying objective should be to enable the private sector, which has been the backbone of India’s capital formation and employment generation, to fulfill its growth potential.

== The economic corridor development strategy ==
Economic corridor development (ECD) is an approach that integrates and synergizes industry, infrastructure, logistics, and urbanization through industrial production clusters linked to urban centers and international gateways by an efficient multimodal transport network. A successful ECD strategy requires quality infrastructure and a policy framework that contributes to an efficient industrial base, attracts investment in the manufacturing sector, and facilitates production for domestic and export markets. Urban centers within a corridor are not only major markets for manufactured and imported goods, but also sources of labor, technology, knowledge, and innovation.

GoI is currently building a host of industrial corridors across the country. Alongside ECEC, four more industrial corridor projects (Delhi-Mumbai, Chennai-Bengaluru, Bengaluru-Mumbai, and Amritsar Kolkata) have been identified, planned, and launched by the GoI. These corridors are spread across India, with a strategic focus on inclusive development to provide an impetus to industrialization and planned urbanization.

== Key dimensions of ECEC ==
=== Port-led industrialization ===
Ports are the cornerstone of international trade and world economic growth, with maritime transport now accounting for nearly 85% of global demand. ECEC’s long coastline and strategic location provide an opportunity to develop multiple international gateways to connect India with global value chains.

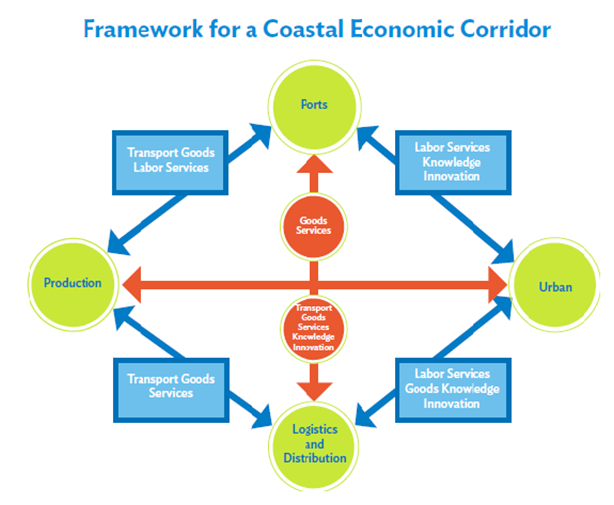

ECEC will buttress the government’s Sagarmala initiative, which seeks to develop India’s economic strength along its coastline by transforming ports, industrial clusters near the coast, and inland logistics infrastructure. ECEC, with its large network of ports and burgeoning maritime industry, is poised to play an important role in developing the maritime hubs.

=== Infrastructure network ===
Improvements to essential and efficient infrastructure will reduce transaction costs for businesses, thus spurring increased private investment, industrial progress, and economic growth. Connecting industries to GVCs centered in East and Southeast Asia requires world-class infrastructure, logistics, and distribution facilities. Upgrading road and rail networks and developing cross-connecting lateral links will stimulate economic activity in existing and emerging clusters and enhance logistics competitiveness in ECEC. It will also provide time- and cost-efficient linkages between the hinterlands and ECEC, as well as secure reliable power supplies for industries by increasing power generation capacities and strengthening the transmission network.

=== Regulatory framework ===
Successful industrialization requires a vibrant economic landscape in which private businesses can thrive. Within ECEC, it is necessary to create a regulatory environment that will improve ease of doing business that makes it straightforward to start a new business, and for existing businesses to grow, innovate, create much-needed jobs, and even close. Institutional changes at the central, state, and district levels can build upon a foundation of past policy reform achievements.

=== Industrialization and urbanization ===
A relatively robust industrial environment in key areas enables the corridor to integrate more effectively with similar regions in the country. Priority industries for ECEC are largely port-based or port-led, signifying the importance of ports and connectivity infrastructure. Moreover, the industries in ECEC align well with containerized commodities currently shipped through West Coast ports. A successful ECD strategy should synchronize industrial development and urbanization by providing adequate physical and social infrastructure in urban centers to meet workers’ quality-of-life needs. Model developments such as Sri City in Andhra Pradesh and the Dholera Special Investment Region in Gujarat offer a way forward in reconciling urbanization and industrial development.

=== Regional integration ===
Most Asian economies, particularly in East and Southeast Asia, have grown by trading with their neighbors. In contrast, South Asia is one of the least economically integrated regions in the world and South Asian economies lag their Asian peers for trade. The various economic corridors being developed across South Asia are expected to facilitate trade by expanding land and maritime routes and stepping up regional integration efforts. ECEC will be interconnected with other corridors and evolve into a regional corridor by connecting existing and new industries with GVCs through ports; efficient multimodal and intermodal transportation networks; and logistics and distribution facilities. As a spine corridor, ECEC will serve as a backbone for regional cooperation projects that enhance exchange within South Asia and between India and East/Southeast Asia.

== Component corridors of ECEC ==
ECEC covers four Indian states. It is home to 20% of India’s population and contributed about $533 billion in 2016-2017 (about 22%) to the country's GDP. The corridor region hosts 7 out of 12 of India’s major ports, namely: Chennai, Ennore, Haldia, Kolkata, Paradip, Tuticorin, and Visakhapatnam. Due to its vast scope, ECEC's development is being undertaken in phases: phase 1 covers the Visakhapatnam–Chennai Industrial Corridor (VCIC), largely in Andhra Pradesh; phase 2 involves the Chennai–Kanyakumari Industrial Corridor (CKIC) in Tamil Nadu; and phase 3 supports the Odisha Economic Corridor (OEC) and the West Bengal Economic Corridor (WBEC).

GOI has selected the Asian Development Bank (ADB) as the lead partner for developing the ECEC. The conceptualization and development of ECEC has received major support from ADB, which carried out analytical work determining the kind of infrastructure and institutional investments necessary to drive manufacturing-led growth in consultation with the Department of Industrial Policy and Promotion, GOI.

=== Visakhapatnam–Chennai Industrial Corridor ===
At the heart of VCIC is a transport corridor that extends north-south over 800 km along National Highway 16 (NH 16) on the coast of Andhra Pradesh connecting clusters where industries are located. VCIC traverses through nine districts with proximity to the urban centers of Visakhapatnam, Vijayawada, and Chennai. The corridor region accounts for more than 75% of the state's output and 4.3% of India's GDP. It is a key region for food production (especially marine products and rice), chemicals, and petrochemical products. It is also becoming a gateway for the textile movement.

VCIC is designed to support the Sunrise Andhra Pradesh Vision 2029. When fully implemented, VCIC is expected to increase GDP in corridor districts by 6 times, increase manufacturing share from 9.4% in 2017 to more than 20% in 2045, and create 9.5 million jobs by 2045.

Four economic nodes were identified for priority development at the conceptual planning stage, namely: Visakhapatnam, Machilipatnam, Donakonda, and Srikalahasti-Yerpedu. In close collaboration with the Andhra Pradesh government, master planning was completed for two priority nodes: Visakhapatnam (7,082 acres) and Srikalahasti-Yerpedu (Chittoor) (26,425 acres).

=== Chennai–Kanyakumari Industrial Corridor ===
CKIC, the second phase of ECEC, aims to unlock the potential to accelerate manufacturing growth in the state of Tamil Nadu. Tamil Nadu already ranks high in India in terms of economic prowess and is one of the most competitive across several key indicators. CKIC’s influence area covers 23 of the 32 districts of Tamil Nadu, which accounts for 74% of the state’s population and 67% of its output. The region has a developed industrial ecosystem in key sectors such as automobiles and textiles. It has 3 major ports and 2 minor ports with a combined cargo of 240 million tonnes per year. CKIC and its infrastructure plan will be aligned with Vision 2023 of the Government of Tamil Nadu and the Sagarmala initiative with an initial focus on the southern region.

Findings from the initial study identified six nodes for development, namely: Petroleum, Chemicals and Petrochemicals Investment Region (PCPIR) at Cuddalore and Nagapattinam; Ariyalur and Perambalur; Trichy-Pudukottai-Sivaganga; Madurai-Virudhunagar-Dindigul-Theni (MVDT); Ramanathapuram; and Thoothukudi and Tirunelveli (TT). With guidance from the Government of Tamil Nadu, the master planning for MVDT and TT nodes is underway.

=== Odisha Economic Corridor ===
The Odisha Economic Corridor is part of the third phase of ECEC. The corridor influence area accounts for 20 districts contributing about 80% of Odisha’s output. Odisha is mineral-rich and contributes to India's steel production more than any state. With proximity to northern Indian states, it can play a crucial role in the transportation of various goods.

Six nodes have been short-listed for the corridor at the conceptual planning stage, namely: Khordha–Cuttack–Jagatsinghpur (KCJ), Jajpur–Kendrapara–Bhadrak (JKB), Sambalpur–Sundargarh–Jharsuguda (SSJ), Mayurbhanj–Keonjhar–Balasore (MKB), Angul–Dhenkanal (AD), and Ganjam. In consultation with the Government of Odisha, factors such as land availability and distances from large cities, highways, and ports have been used to prioritize the two nodes of KCJ and JKB. These nodes have the key urban areas of Bhubaneswar and Cuttack.

=== West Bengal Economic Corridor ===
West Bengal has the fourth largest economy in India with $155 billion in state output in 2017-2018. It is the 6th biggest contributor to India's manufacturing, and 4th biggest in India's services, which provides nearly 40 million jobs. It contributes more than 20 percent of the country’s mineral production and accounts for 10% of the country's iron and steel exports. It is India's leading state in terms of power distribution, quality and availability. It is strategically located as a gateway to northeast India and Southeast Asia, being served by key national highways and Asian highways; two large container and bulk handling ports at Kolkata and Haldia; two international airports, and several inland waterways.

Conceptual development planning for WBEC is underway. The proposed spine is that along NH 16 from Sonakania to Kolkata, and along NH 112 from Kolkata to Bongaon (Bangladesh border), with another fork linked to the Amritsar Kolkata Industrial Corridor through NH 60. Key industrial nodes being considered based on land availability include Goaltore (Paschim Medinipur) and Andal (Burdwan) located in Aerotropolis. The key industries identified for these potential nodes (Goaltore) based on initial assessment include fabricated metal products, machinery and equipment, and transport equipment. Potential for sub-sectors in food processing and cement are also being evaluated.

== Asian Development Bank support for ECEC ==
=== Analytical studies ===
Analytical work is done in two phases: the conceptual development plan (CDP) followed by master planning. With ADB's assistance, CDP for the first 3 sub-corridors of ECEC has already been completed. The CDP assessed each corridor for market strengths and potential linkages with GVCs; and identified industrial nodes, assessed future growth industries, and mapped out critical infrastructure needs. It also recommended policy and regulatory reforms to create a business-friendly environment. Master planning is completed for VCIC, and is in progress for CKIC. The master plan guides government agencies in initiating the development of the corridor region. It focuses on identifying industries suitable to each priority node and industrial site, assessing land demand, mapping out required connectivity and trunk infrastructure and amenities, and identifying early bird projects. It also intends to put forward a social impact assessment and resettlement action plan for the economic nodes.

=== Financial mobilization ===
ADB has supported the corridor’s conceptualization and development and carried out analytical work in consultation with the DIPP, GoI to determine the infrastructure and institutional investments needed to drive manufacturing-led growth. ADB approved on September 20, 2016 (i) a $500 million multi-tranche financing facility (MFF), and (ii) a $125 million policy-based loan (PBL), both to India for the Visakhapatnam–Chennai Industrial Corridor Development Program (VCICDP). The MFF will support priority infrastructure investments in the VCIC, and the PBL will support policy reforms and institutional development in the state. For CKIC and Odisha, ADB is in consultation with the state governments in supporting several priority infrastructure investments in the transport, urban, and power sectors. Subject to the confirmation of the Government of India, ADB is planning to provide $1 billion per year in 2018-2022 to help develop ECEC.

=== Policy and Advisory Support ===
ADB has been supporting Andhra Pradesh in improving its ease of doing business and creating a business-friendly regulatory environment. In July 2018, Andhra Pradesh, with a score of 98.42 per cent, topped the ease of doing business ranking among Indian states prepared by the World Bank and DIPP. In the prior year, Andhra Pradesh and Telangana had jointly topped the same rankings. Parameters for the rankings include construction permits, labor regulations, environmental registration, access to information, land availability, and single window systems. DIPP collaborates with the World Bank in conducting an annual reform exercise for all states and union territories under the Business Reform Action Plan.

=== Investment Promotion ===
ADB has also been assisting GoI and state governments in attracting new investment into ECEC—drawing in key anchor investors into the corridor, and encouraging expansion of existing businesses. Reaching out to the business community aims to tailor the direction of infrastructure investment and policy reforms in ECEC following the most urgent needs of existing and potential investors. ADB has supported activities that highlight investment opportunities in ECEC including road shows, business summits, government-to-business conferences, and business-to-business meetings.

== See also ==
- Amritsar Delhi Kolkata Industrial Corridor
- Asian Development Bank
- Chennai Bangalore Industrial Corridor
- Delhi Mumbai Industrial Corridor Project
- Mumbai-Bangalore economic corridor
- South Asian Association for Regional Cooperation
- South Asia Subregional Economic Cooperation
- Visakhapatnam-Chennai Industrial Corridor
- Eastern Economic Corridor (India)
