= Transport corridor =

Type of transport infrastructure

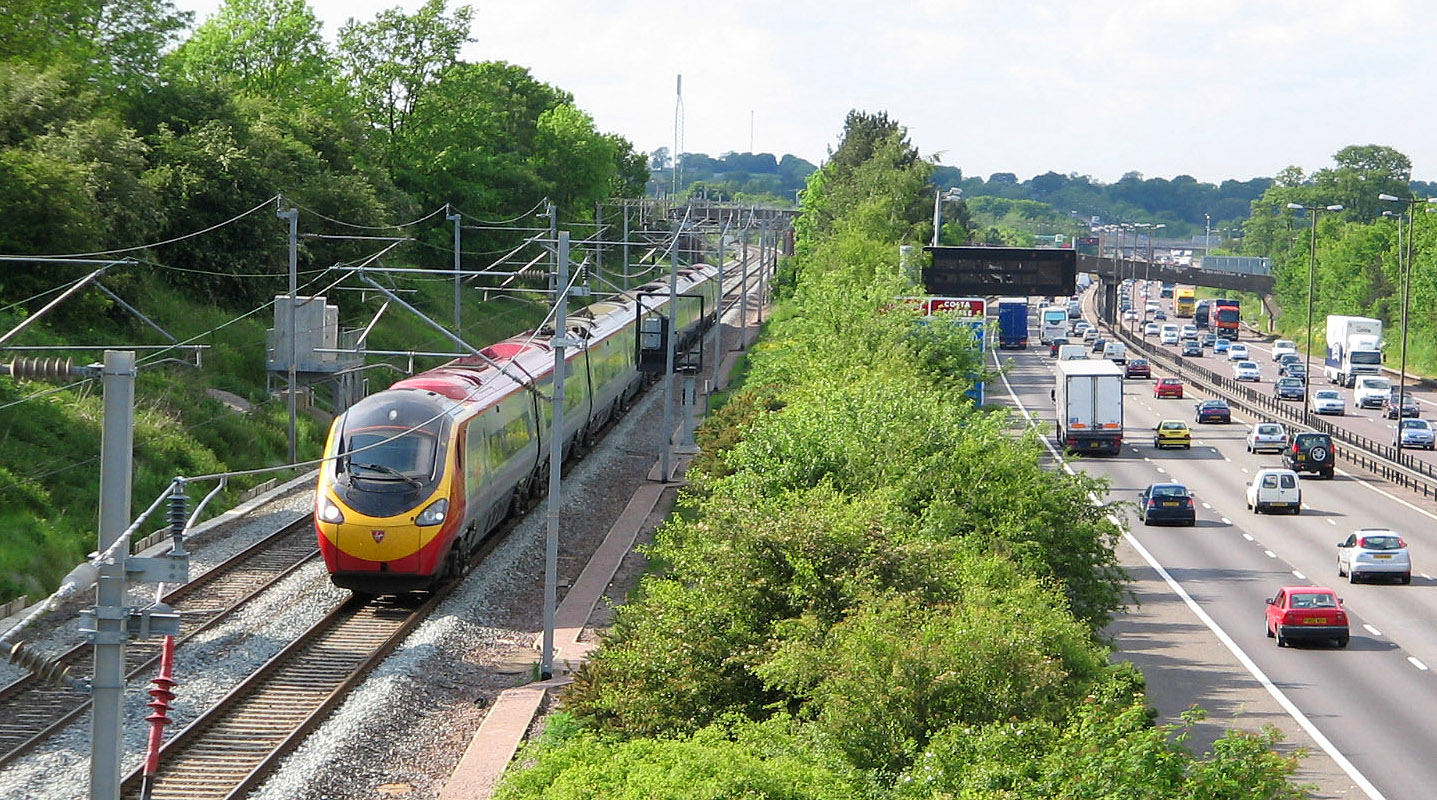
The M1 Motorway was built alongside the West Coast Main Line in Northamptonshire.

A transport corridor is a generally linear area that is defined by one or more modes of transportation crossing the limits of more than one city or county like highways, railroads or public transit which share a common destination. Development often occurs around transportation corridors because they carry so many people, creating linear agglomerations like the Las Vegas Strip or the linear form of many neighborhood retail areas.

A 2019 review and meta-analysis of research into transport corridors found that they improved economic welfare, but had adverse environmental impacts.

== Examples ==
- TEN-T Core Network Corridors – planned infrastructure network in the European Union
- Transportation Corridor Agencies – administrative body for toll roads in Orange County, California.
- Pan-European corridors – planned intercity rail network in Central and Eastern Europe
- Western Railway Corridor – proposed rail network in western Ireland
- Southeast High Speed Rail Corridor – proposed high-speed rail network in the Mid-Atlantic and Southeastern United States
- Northeast Corridor – Amtrak high-speed rail network in the Northeast megalopolis of the United States
- Panama Canal – artificial waterway linking the Atlantic Ocean and the Pacific Ocean
- Zangezur corridor – proposed rail and highway infrastructure network linking Europe to Asia.

=== Southeast Asia ===
Sourced from

- North–South Economic Corridor
- East–West Economic Corridor
- Southern Economic Corridor

== See also ==
- Ribbon development
- Linear settlement
- Right-of-way (transportation)
- Economic corridor
