= Raipur–Visakhapatnam Expressway =

Proposed road in India

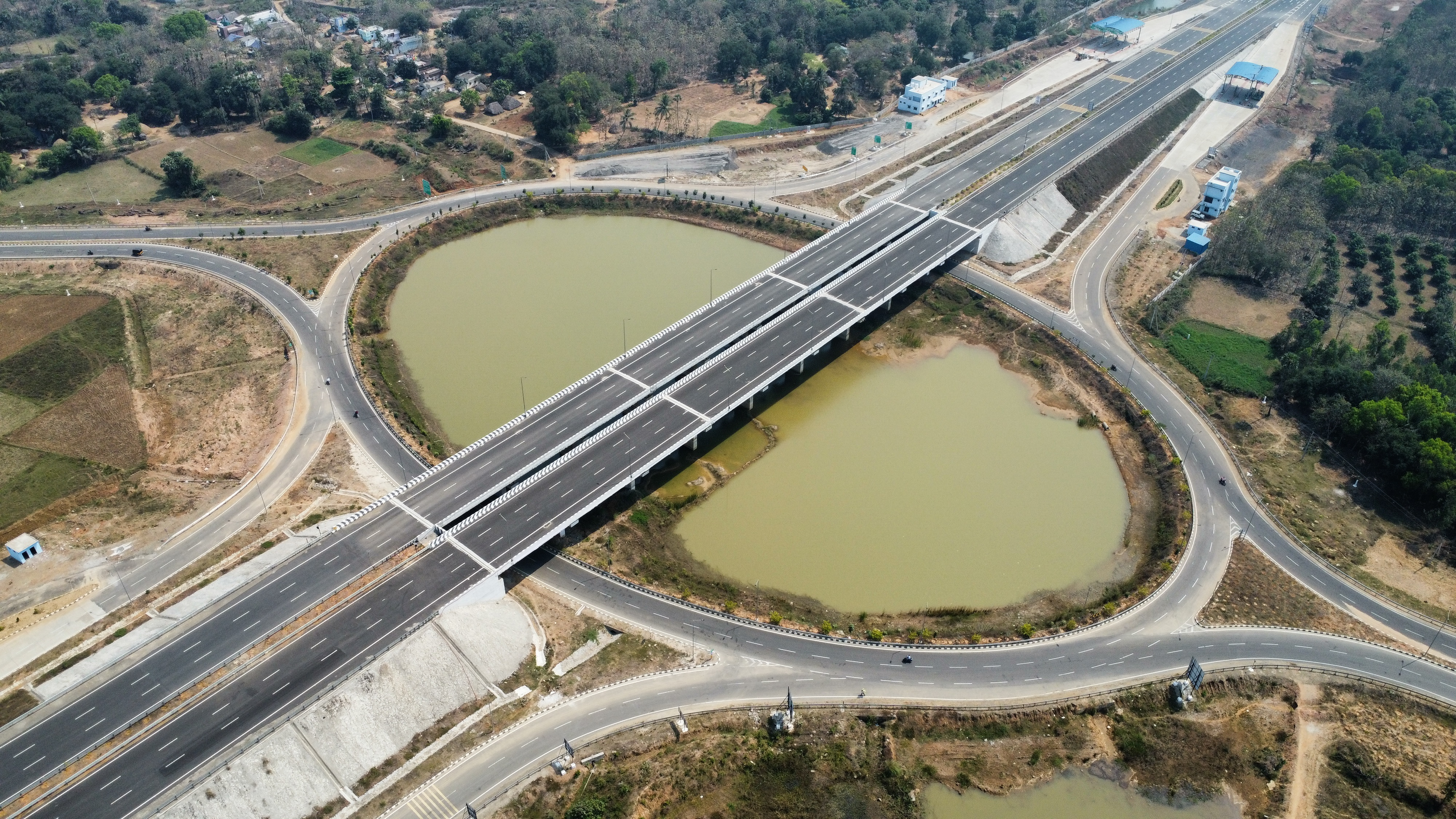
- Interchange at Jami, Vizianagaram

Route information
- Maintained by National Highways Authority of India (NHAI)
- Length: 464 km (288 mi)
- Status: Under construction
- Existed: December 2026 (expected)–present

Major junctions
- North end: NH 30 in Abhanpur, Raipur district, Chhattisgarh
- South end: Visakhapatnam Port, Visakhapatnam, Andhra Pradesh

Location
- Country: India
- States: Chhattisgarh, Odisha and Andhra Pradesh
- Major cities: Raipur, Kurud, Dhamtari, Kanker, Kondagaon, Koraput, Vizianagaram, Sabbavaram and Visakhapatnam

Highway system
- Roads in India; Expressways; National; State; Asian

Raipur–Visakhapatnam Expressway (NH-130CD), part of Raipur–Visakhapatnam Economic Corridor (EC-15), is an under-construction, six-lane, 464 km (288 mi) long greenfield expressway, which will pass through the states of Chhattisgarh, Odisha and Andhra Pradesh in central and east-central India. At present, from Durg, it runs between NH-30 and NH-130C till Borigumma, then runs east of NH-26 till Sunabeda and then west of NH-26 till Visakhapatnam after terminating with NH-16 (Golden Quadrilateral) at Vizianagaram. Along the new route, it will connect Raipur by starting at Abhanpur in Raipur district with the cities of Dhamtari, Kanker, Kondagaon, Koraput, and Sabbavaram before terminating at Visakhapatnam Port.

It will reduce the current travel time and distance, from 13 hours to only 6-7 hours, and from 595 km (370 mi) to 464 km (288 mi). It is a part of the Bharatmala Pariyojana, and it will connect the East Coast Economic Corridor, which runs from Kolkata to Kanyakumari at Vizianagaram. It will be sequentially interconnected with the rest of the country via the national highways NH-30–NH-34–NH-539–NH-44-Yamuna Expressway, Gwalior - Agra Expressway and Gwalior - Lakhnadon Expressway thus connecting Raipur and Visakhapatnam directly to central and north Indian cities, such as Delhi, Agra, Gwalior, Sagar and Jabalpur.

== History ==
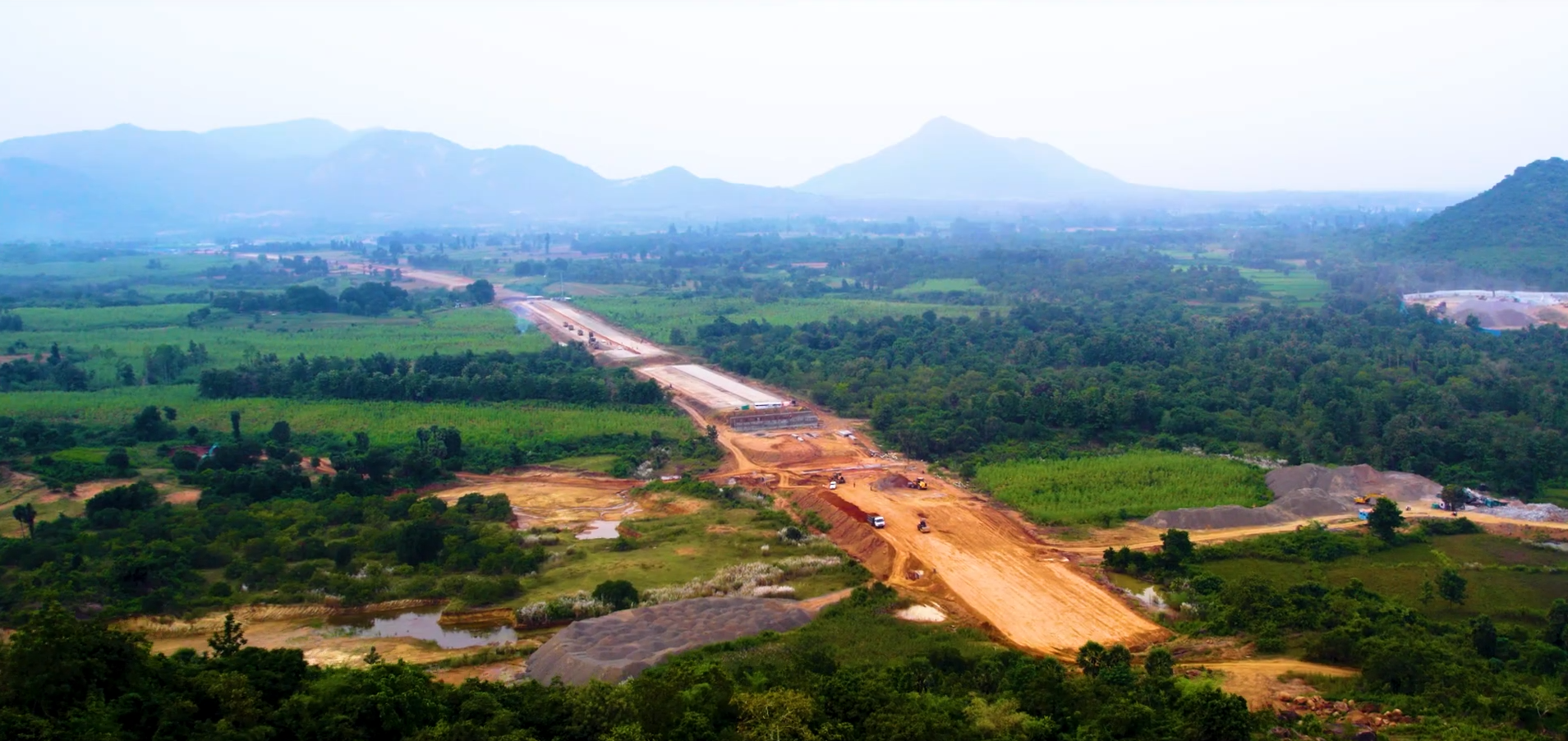
Aerial view of an under-construction Raipur Vizag Expressway, 2022

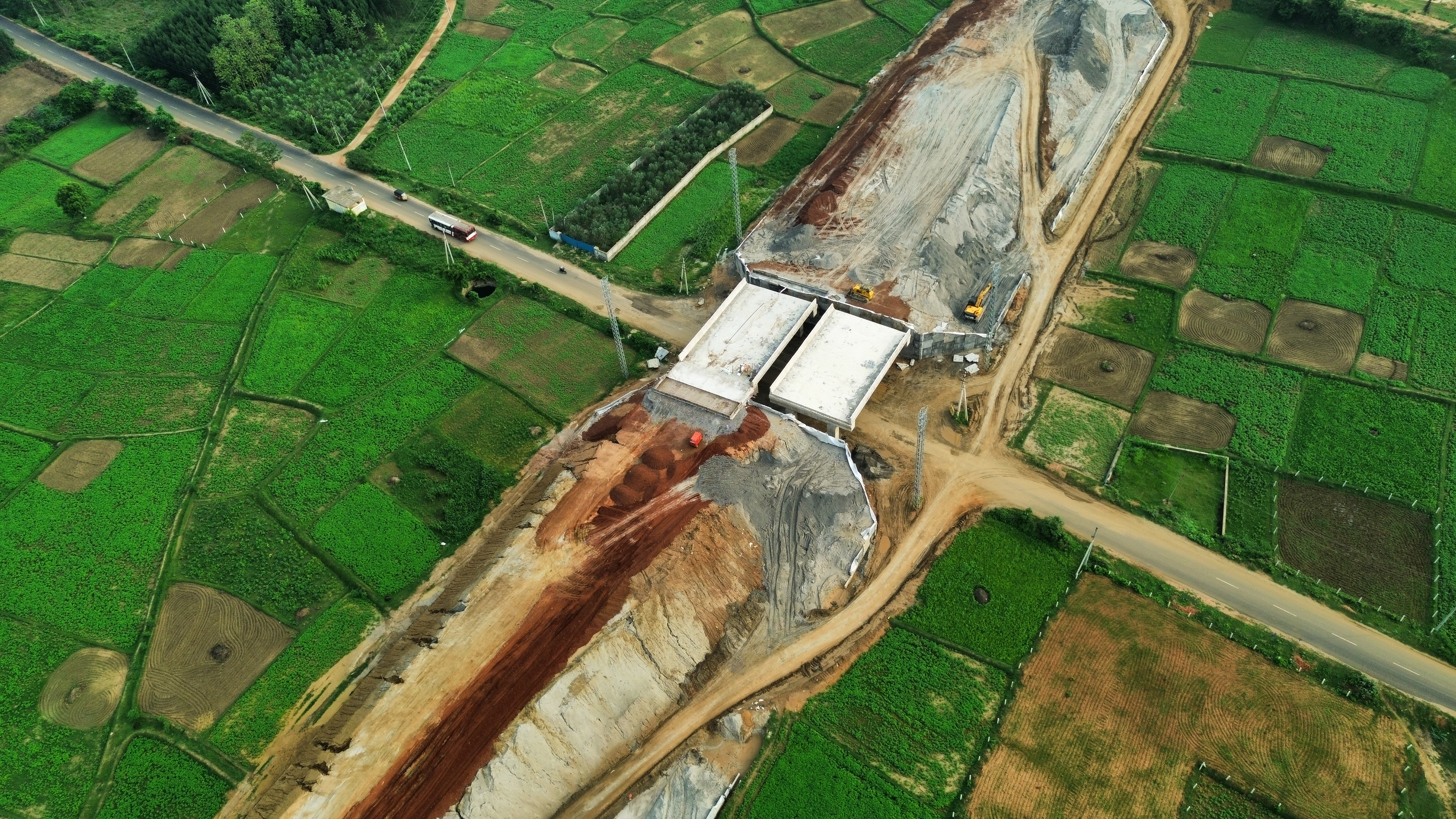
Bridge under construction of the Expressway near Kothavalasa, Vizianagaram

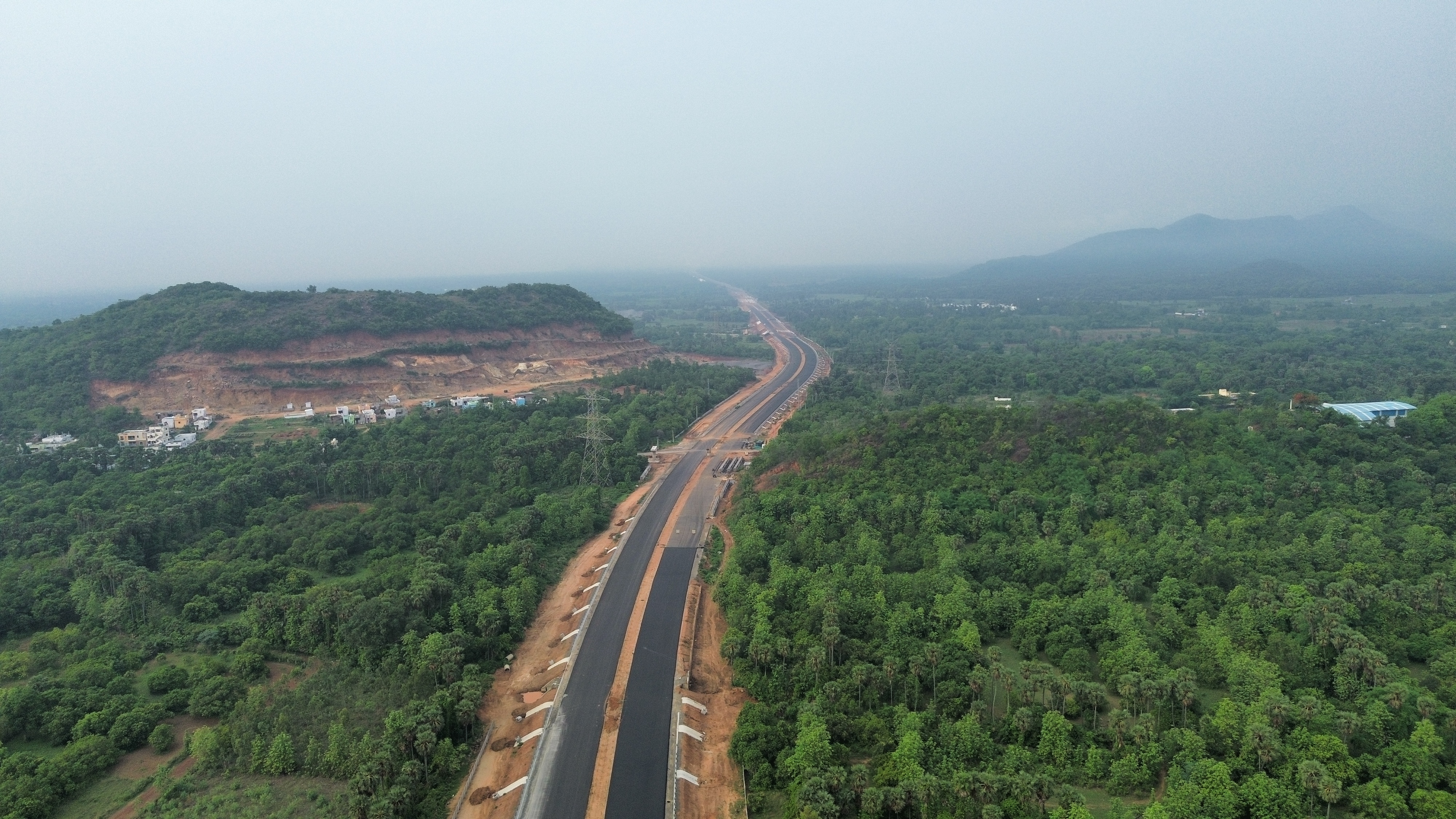
Aerial view of Raipur Vizag Expressway near Kothavalasa

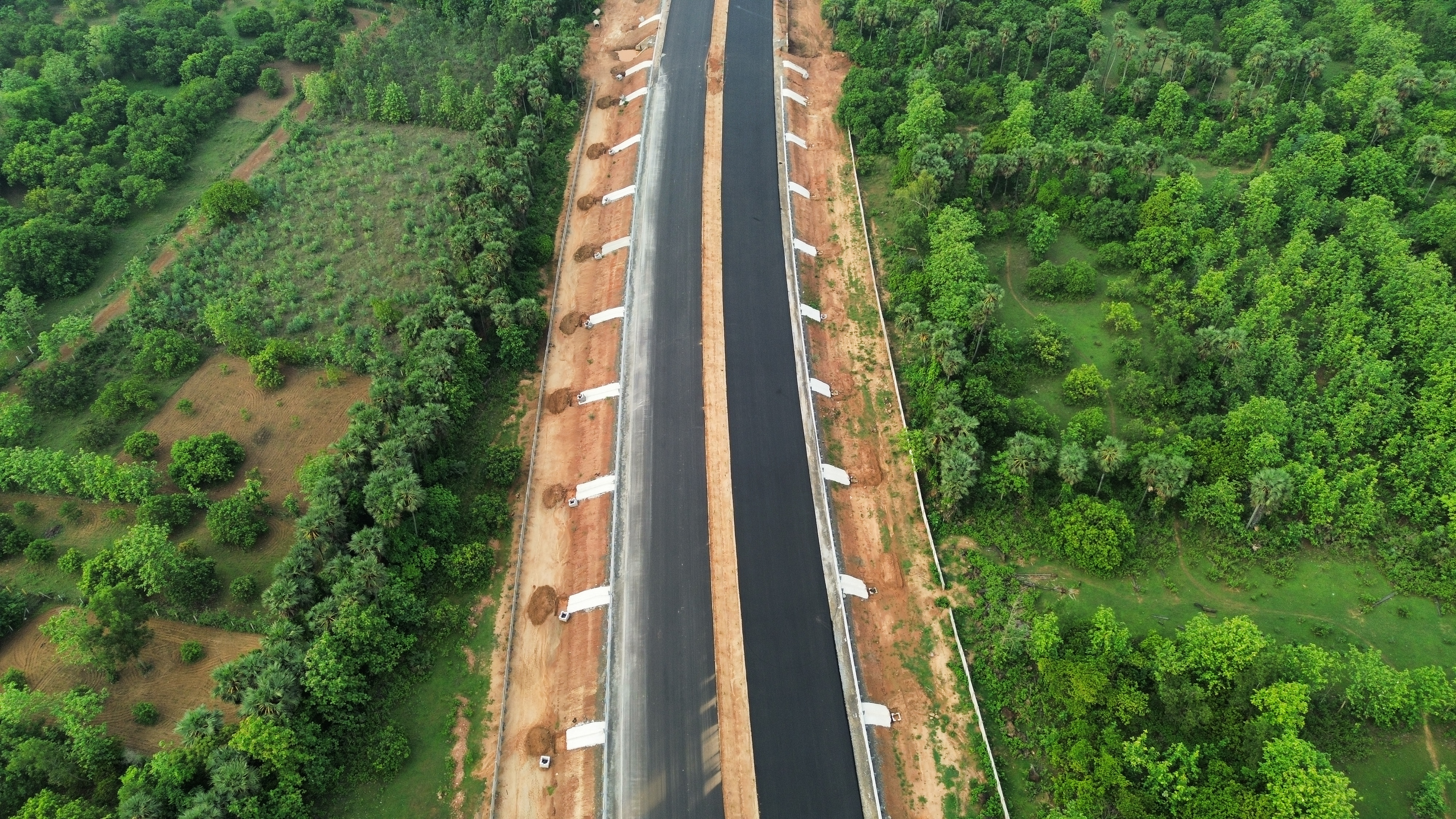
Under construction near Kothavalasa

To improve connectivity, tourism, development and economic growth in Central India, the Ministry of Road Transport and Highways (MoRTH) planned to build an expressway from Raipur to Visakhapatnam in 2014. It will reduce both travel time and distance, from 13 hours to only 8-9 hours, and from 595 km to 464 km. It will pass through the regions of Dandakaranya and the Eastern Ghats. Once completed, these regions will see exponential growth with the growth of industries and socio-economic development by promoting employment among people living in the regions, which the regions currently lack altogether. The plan was approved by the Government of India in 2017, and Prime Minister Narendra Modi laid the foundation stone for the construction of the expressway in November 2022. The project is being built at a cost of ₹ 20,000 crore, and construction is ongoing on most parts of the expressway's route. The expressway is expected to become operational by 2025.

== Route ==
=== Chhattisgarh ===
In Chhattisgarh, it will pass through 4 south-eastern districts at between NH-30 and NH-130C:

- Raipur district
  - south of Raipur, begins at Kurud on intersection of NH-30, NH-130C and SH-22.
- Dhamtari district
  - Kundel
- Kanker district
  - northeast of Kanker, passes near Naharpur
  - immediate east of Kanker, passes through Sarona on SH-6 (Kanker-Mukundpur road)
- Kondagaon district
  - east of Keskal
  - Salna (immediate west of Kundel), enters Odisha here

=== Odisha ===
In Odisha, it will pass through two south-western-most districts on the eastern and western side of NH-26 in Nabarangpur and Koraput districts, respectively:

- Nabarangpur district, runs along the eastern side of NH-26.
  - Sunapali, enters Odisha here.
  - west of Raighar
  - west of Umerkote
  - west of Dabugaon
  - west of Papadahandi
  - west of Nabarangpur
- Koraput district, runs along the western side of NH-26.
  - east of Kotpad (east of)
  - Gaudaguda, moves from west to east side of NH-26.
  - east of Borigumma
  - immediate east of Raniguda
  - immediate east of Koraput
  - immediate east of Sunabeda, south of Sunabeda; it moves from east to west side of NH-26.
  - Pottangi
  - Ondarangi on the border of Odisha-Andhra Pradesh, exits Odisha and enters Andhra Pradesh.

=== Andhra Pradesh ===
In Andhra Pradesh, it will pass only through one district in northeast Andhra Pradesh, on the western side of NH-26:

- Vizianagaram district
  - west of Salur
  - west of Gajapathinagaram
  - west of Vizianagaram
  - between Sabbavaram-Anandapuram, terminates here on SH-9 Anakapalle-Rajapulova Road.

== Construction ==
The expressway will be fully six-lane, access-controlled and a greenfield project. It is being built using the Hybrid Annuity Model (HAM) mode of construction. The land acquisition and the bidding process for the project is fully completed, except three packages in the Odisha section, and construction is ongoing on most of the expressway's route. The Detailed Project Report (DPR) of the project was made by the South Korean firm, YONGMA Engineering Co. Ltd. – Arkitechno Consultants. The project has been divided into 19 packages. The following table lists the packages, contractors and their statuses.

=== Chhattisgarh ===
Packages	Chainages (Note: Distances from the origin of the expressway, i.e., Raipur.)	Contractor	Status
Package-1	Abhanpur to Magerlod (Dhamtari district) (km 0.000 km to 42.852 km)	Shalimar Corporation	Under construction
Package-2	Sargi to Basanwahi (Kanker district) (42.800 km to km 99.500 km)	Dilip Buildcon Ltd.	Under construction
Package-3	Basanwahi to Marangpuri (Chhattisgarh-Odisha border) (99.500 km to km 124.661 km)	KMV Projects	Under construction

=== Odisha ===
Packages	Chainages	Contractor	Status
Package-1	Dhanara (Odisha-Chhattisgarh Border) to Hatibena (Nabarangpur district) (124.611 km to 146.500 km)	NKC Projects	Under construction
Package-2	Hatibena to Badakumari (146.500 km to 179.000 km), Nabarangpur district	Barbrik	Under construction
Package-3	Badakumari to Karki (179.000 km to 226.500 km), Nabarangpur district	Adani Transport	Under construction
Package-4	Karki to Kaliagura (226.500 km to 249.000 km), Nabarangpur district	NKC Projects	Under construction
Package-5	Borigumma to Dasamantpur (249.000 km to 293.000 km), Koraput district	HG Infra Engineering	Under construction
Package-6	Koraput to Pottangi (293.000 km to 338.500 km), Koraput district	HG Infra Engineering	Under construction
Package-7	Baraja to Kandili, Koraput district	DRA Infracon	Under construction
Package-8	Kandili to Tumbiguda, Koraput district	Max Infra	Under construction
Package-9	TBD	TBD	Pending notice
Package-10	TBD	TBD	Pending notice
Package-11	TBD	TBD	Pending notice

=== Andhra Pradesh ===
Packages	Chainages	Contractor	Status
Package-1	Aluru to Jakkuva (365.033 km to 396.800 km), Parvathipuram Manyam district	HG Infra Engineering	Under construction
Package-2	Jakkuva to Korlam (Vizianagaram district) (396.800 km to km 421.100 km)	NKC Projects	Under construction
Package-3	Korlam to Kantakapalle (421.100 km to 445.100 km), Vizianagaram district	PSK Infrastructures and Projects	Under construction
Package-4	Kantakapalle to Sabbavaram (Visakhapatnam district) (445.100 km to 464.662 km)	NKC Projects	Under construction

== Benefits ==
The expressway will benefit Central India along with the entire country as follows:

- Trade: The expressway has been planned specially to boost exports from Central India, to benefit the mineral-rich states of the western part of Madhya Pradesh, Chhattisgarh and Odisha by boosting exports of goods and minerals, and reducing dependency on imports through the Visakhapatnam Port to countries of East Asia and the Asia-Pacific, i.e., China, South Korea, Japan, Taiwan, Indonesia, etc., the main countries to where the minerals get exported.
- Tourism: The expressway will help to facilitate tourism by developing backward and relatively unknown areas in the Dandakaranya and the Eastern Ghats regions, due to the presence of a high level of tourist spots dotted across the three states, also major destinations like Araku Valley, along the expressway's route, and several wildlife parks, sanctuaries including some national parks, such as Sitanadi Wildlife Sanctuary, Indravati National Park, Amravati Forest Range, Ambapani Sanctuary, etc.
- Connectivity: The expressway will not only create a direct route from Raipur to Visakhapatnam, but in the coming years, will also see the entire Central India get connected directly with the rest of the country, through other expressways, even internationally, with Nepal. These links will altogether result in faster, safer and better commute and transportation of goods and people to and from the country.
- Protection of the Environment: To ensure the protection of the green cover and the environment, as the expressway will pass through the Eastern Ghats, the entire route of it will have plants and trees in between and along its both sides. To avoid noise and light pollution affecting the environment, noise barriers will be installed on both sides, which will block noise, as well as light, on all forest sections of the expressway. Other procedures undertaken are the usage of sustainable construction methods and the construction of tunnels along hilly sections.
- Employment: Due to increase in industrial activities along the expressway's route, various agricultural and industrial initiatives to help the state's economy and growth. The establishment of these numerous centres will result in multiple job possibilities for thousands of people living in both the states.

== Proposed future connectivity ==
Following additional connectivity has been proposed by constructing new links with the expressway:

=== NCR–CMC hubs of Bathinda–Hisar–Jaipur–Gwalior ===
There is a proposal to link this corridor to north-western India by a combination of constructing greenfield stretches and upgrading existing roads through National Capital Region's Counter Magnet Cities (NCR–CMC) of Bhatinda-Hisar–Jaipur (via Karauli)–Gwalior. This requires the construction of a road-cum-rail bridge over the Chambal River between Karauli-Taintara and/or Sirmathura-Joura.

- Connect to Bathinda to connect to Pathankot–Ajmer Expressway and Amritsar–Jamnagar Expressway.
- Bathinda–Hisar: Greenfield alignment from Bhatinda–Kullan (between Ratia and Tohana) - between Bhuna and Uklanamandi - between Agroha and Barwala, between Barwala and Hansi, intersect with Trans-Haryana Expressway near Mundhal Khurd and Meham. As an independent project, it will continue to NH-9, Kalanaur, north of Beri, Western Peripheral Expressway and Bahadurgarh.
- Hisar–Pilani–Jhunjhunu: Upgrade of Hisar (elevated from railway over-bridge near Mangali to Camp Chowk, Jat College and Thandi Sadak over-bridge)-Mangali–Saharwa (with a greenfield Siwani–Sahrwa–Dobeta–Kanwari–Bawani Khera spur . Greenfield alignment from Sharwa to Bidhwan–Bahal to Norangpura (west of Pilani) to Baragaon (south of Jhunjuhunu on Rajasthan SH-32).
- Jhunjhunu–Jaipur: greenfield Baragaon-Raghunathpura, upgrade existing from Raghunathpura–Udaipurwati-Kotri Luharwas, greenfield from Kotri Luharwas to Khandela Mod bus stand, upgrade existing route from Khandela Mod bus stand to Srimadhopur-Reengus to connect it to NH-52. From there greenfield alignment to Tonk via Reengus-Hasteda-Gori Ka Bas-Lalpura–Bagru–Phagi–Galod–Tonk resulting in direct access to another NCR CMS city of Kota.
- Chambal River, this requires the construction of a greenfield highway and a road-cum-rail bridge over the river, between Karauli-Taintara and/or Sirmathura-Joura with 2 spurs on eastern flank of Chambal - one each to connect to Gwalior and Datia.

=== NCR–CMG hubs of Ludhiana–Patiala–Ambala–Narnaul–Alwar ===
There is another proposal to link this corridor to Trans-Haryana Expressway and beyond to Delhi–Amritsar–Katra Expressway, Delhi–Mumbai Expressway and Delhi–Mumbai Industrial Corridor Project by a combination of constructing greenfield stretches and upgrading existing roads through Narnaul-Alwar-Karauli-Mohana-Datia (and/or Gwalior). Detailed routes will see the upgrade of existing State Highways (SH) to National Highways (NH), such as:

- Rajasthan SH-14 (Narnaul–Alwar–Mathura Highway), with whole route between Narnaul and Mathura to be upgraded for economic corridor and the religious Krishna Yatra Circuit.
- Rajasthan SH-25, Alwar–Rajgarh portion to be upgraded.
- Dalalpura/Machari to Berkhera-Mahwa, a greenfield alignment, alternatively the longer existing Rajasthan SH-35 Rajgarh-Mahwa portion can be upgraded.
- Rajasthan SH-22, Mahwa–Hindon–Karauli portion to be upgraded.
- Chambal River, this requires the construction of a greenfield highway and a road-cum-rail bridge over the river between Karauli–Taintara and/or Sirmathura–Joura with 2 spurs on eastern flank of Chambal - one each to connect to Gwalior and Datia.

=== Eastern Economic Corridor ===
There is a proposal to connect it to Eastern Economic Corridor (Paradeep in Odisha to Raxaul on Bihar–Nepal border), by constructing either a spur or a loop in Chhattisgarh.

== Status updates ==
- 2014: The expressway's plan was launched by the Ministry of Road Transport and Highways (MoRTH) to the Government of India.
- 2017: The project was added by the Government of India to the Bharatmala Pariyojana's Phase-I.
- August 2020: The expressway's completion date was set to March 2024.
- March 2021: The Detailed Project Report (DPR) was completed.
- April 2021: The National Highways Authority of India (NHAI) launched tenders for the project.
- September 2021: The NHAI issued tenders for two 5 km-long tunnels through the Eastern Ghats section.
- November 2022: The foundation stone was laid by Prime Minister, Narendra Modi, for the start of the project's construction.
- January 2023: Construction began on a 2.8 km-long tunnel in a valley area of the Chhattisgarh section.

== See also ==
- Expressways in Chhattisgarh
- Expressways of India
- Industrial corridor
- Eastern Economic Corridor (India)
- East Coast Economic Corridor
