= Bhutan–Myanmar relations =

- Bhutan: Myanmar

Envoy
- Ambassador Mr. Kinzang Dorji: Ambassador Kyaw Aung

Bhutan–Myanmar relations refer to the bilateral ties between the Kingdom of Bhutan and the Republic of the Union of Myanmar, two nations in South and Southeast Asia. Diplomatic relations were formally established on February 1, 2012. Both countries are member of BIMSTEC and SASEC.

== Background ==
Bhutan lies on the Eastern Himalayas and Myanmar lies in Southeast Asia. Both countries have strong roots in Buddhism. Prior to the establishment of formal diplomatic ties, Bhutan and Myanmar had limited direct interactions due to geographical distance and differing regional affiliations.

The two countries relation begun with the cooperation in the health sector which was on early 1995. On June 15, 1995, the Royal Civil Service Commission of Bhutan and Myanmar’s Ministry of Health signed a Memorandum of Understanding (MoU) to facilitate collaboration. Between 2004 and 2015, 71 Myanmar medical specialists worked in Bhutan to contribute the development of Bhutan's healthcare system.

== Relations and trades ==
On February 1, 2012, both country formally established diplomatic relations. As of currently, Kinzang Dorji serves as Bhutan’s Ambassador to Myanmar, and Kyaw Aung represents Myanmar in Bhutan. Bhutan maintains embassies in only six countries.

On May 24, 2016, both country signed a new agreement to improve air travel between their countries.

In 2017, Bhutan exported approximately $7,810 worth of goods to Myanmar, primarily consisting of ball bearings, hand tools, and wrenches.

During the Sixth BIMSTEC Summit held in Bangkok on April 4, 2025, Bhutanese Prime Minister Tshering Tobgay met with Myanmar’s Senior General Min Aung Hlaing in strengthening cooperation in health, education and cultural exchanges.

== See also ==
- Foreign relations of Bhutan
- Foreign relations of Myanmar
