= Palakkad Industrial Smart City =

Industrial Smart City in Kerala, India

- Industrial city
- Location within Kerala
- Country: India
- State: Kerala
- District: Palakkad

Area
  - Total: 1,540 ha (3,806 acres)

The Palakkad Industrial Smart City is an under construction greenfield industrial smart city spread over an area of 1,710 acres (6.9 km^{2}) Palakkad district, Kerala, India. It is a part of the Kochi Bengaluru Industrial Corridor Project, The Economic Affairs Committee of the Union Cabinet has approved 12 Industrial Smart Cities in ten states including Palakkad Industrial Smart City in Kerala.

== Overview ==
The Union Cabinet approved the Palakkad industrial city, part of a 12-city initiative under the National Industrial Corridor Development program. The city will be built on 1,710 acres, with an estimated investment of ₹28,602 crore. Palakkad is a key component of the Kochi-Bengaluru industrial corridor, expected to attract ₹10,000 crore in Kerala. The Government of Kerala acquired 82% of the land in 2022. The project received approvals from the National Industrial Corridor Trust Board and the Environment Ministry. A special purpose vehicle, Kerala Industrial Corridor Development Corporation, has been formed. Once the master plan and detailed project report are finalized, the tendering process will begin.

Palakkad industrial city will focus on medical, chemical, botanical products, hi-tech industry, non-metallic mineral products, fabricated metal products, rubber-plastic products, machinery and equipment.

== See also ==
- Emerging Kerala
- Kochi Bengaluru Industrial Corridor Project
- Amritsar Delhi Kolkata Industrial Corridor
