= ECEC =

The abbreviation ECEC may refer to:

- East Coast Economic Corridor, an economic corridor covering the east coast of India
- Early Childhood Education and Care, a division of the Department of Education, Queensland, Australia
- Early childhood education and care, a (near) synonym for Early childhood education
