= Abhanpur Junction railway station =

Railway station in Chhattisgarh

Abhanpur Junction

General information
- Location: Abhanpur, Chhattisgarh; India
- Coordinates: 21.0519°N 81.7453°E
- Elevation: 331 metres (1,086 ft)
- System: Indian Railways station
- Owner: Indian Railways
- Operator: Raipur railway division
- Lines: Raipur–Dhamtari branch line Abhanpur–Rajim branch line
- Platforms: 3
- Tracks: 4
- Connections: Auto stand

Construction
- Structure type: Standard (on-ground station)
- Parking: No
- Cycle facilities: No

Other information
- Status: Functioning
- Station code: AVP
- Fare zone: South East Central Railway

Services
Preceding station	Indian Railways	Following station
Kendri towards ?	South East Central Railway zone Raipur–Dhamtari branch line	Chataud towards ?
Terminus	South East Central Railway zone Abhanpur–Rajim branch line	Manik Chauree Halt towards ?
Location

Abhanpur Junction Railway Station is a main narrow-gauge railway junction in Raipur district, Chhattisgarh. Its code is AVP. It serves Abhanpur city. The station consists of 2 platforms. The station lies on the Raipur–Dhamtari branch line as well as Abhanpur–Rajim branch line of Bilaspur–Nagpur section.

== Major trains ==
- Kendri–Dhamtari NG Passenger
- Abhanpur–Rajim NG Passenger
- Rajim–Kendri NG Passenger
