= Mumbai-Bangalore economic corridor =

Location of Mumbai and Bangalore within India

The Bengaluru–Mumbai Industrial Corridor (BMIC) is a proposed economic corridor in India between Mumbai and Bangalore. The corridor is spread across the states of Karnataka and Maharashtra and passes through major cities such as Davanagere, Chitradurga, Hubli–Dharwad, Belagavi, Solapur, Kolhapur, Satara and Pune. The overall length of the corridor is around 1,000 km and covers an area of around 143,000 km^{2}. The corridor is delineated around the existing National Highway 48 (NH48) (which connects Bangalore to Mumbai), the existing Bangalore-Mumbai railway line and the Dabhol–Bangalore Natural Gas Pipeline.

The Indian government aims to generate an investment over ₹3 lakh crore (US$31 billion) from this corridor and expects it to create 2.5 million jobs.

During the India–United Kingdom summit in November 2013, the Indian and British governments agreed to jointly conduct a feasibility study of the project. The DMICDC and the UK Trade and Investment (UKTI) were appointed as the nodal agencies for the project, representing the two sides respectively. The DMICDC floated a tender to appoint a consultant for the project in November 2013, awarded the contract to a joint venture between Egis India Consulting Engineers Pvt. Ltd., ile-de-France and CRISIL Risk & Infrastructure Solutions Limited on 14 February 2014. The feasibility study was financed by the Government of India.

The government has envisaged at least four new cities to boost manufacturing activity across the corridor for which the detailed plan is yet to be finalised.

== See also ==
- National Industrial Corridors of India
- Amritsar–Delhi–Kolkata Industrial Corridor
- Chennai Bangalore Industrial Corridor
- Delhi–Mumbai Industrial Corridor Project.
- Visakhapatnam–Chennai Industrial Corridor
- Delhi–Saharanpur–Dehradun economic corridor
