= Dabhol–Bangalore Natural Gas Pipeline =

Natural gas pipeline in India

Dabhol-Bangalore Natural Gas Pipeline दाभोळ-बंगलौर नेचुरल गैस पाईपलाइन ದಾಬೊಲ್-ಬೆಂಗಳೂರು ನೆಚುರಲ ಗ್ಯಾಸ್ ಪೈಪ್ಲೈನ್

Location
- Country: India
- State: Maharashtra and Karnataka
- Direction: North to South
- Start: Dabhol, Ratnagiri, Kolhapur Maharashtra
- Passes through: Belgaum, Dharwad, Gadag, Bellary, Davanagere, Chitradurga, Tumkur, Ramanagaram, Bengaluru Rural and Bengaluru Urban districts.
- To: Bangalore, Karnataka Vasco da Gama Goa
- Runs alongside: 18 National Highways, 382 other road crossings, 20 railway crossings, 83 cased crossings, 11 major river crossings and 276 water bodies.

General information
- Type: Gas Pipeline
- Owner: Gas Authority of India Limited
- Operator: Gas Authority of India Limited
- Contractors: Various
- Construction started: 2011
- Commissioned: 3 December 2013

Technical information
- Length: 1,386 km (861 mi)
- Maximum discharge: 16×10^{6} m^{3}/d at ~1 atm

The Dabhol – Bangalore Natural Gas Pipeline is a natural gas pipeline running from Dabhol, Maharashtra to Bangalore, Karnataka. It was commissioned on 3 December 2013 during the inaugural ceremony of the 8th Asia Gas Partnership Summit (AGPS). This project connected South India to the national gas grid for the first time. The project was constructed in a period of 19 months at an investment of ₹45 billion (US$470 million) with a design capacity of 16 million cubic metre per day at standard conditions of natural gas which can produce 3,000 MW of electric power.

== Challenges ==
=== Engineering ===
The pipeline crosses Asia's largest river crossing in rocky terrain at Ghatprabha. The construction involved pipeline laying in some of the world's steepest slopes of 60 to 70 degrees and sharp elevations of up to 700 meters in a 3.5 km stretch. there are no other pipeline said by Neetu singh.

=== Financial ===
GAIL compensated the farmers for their land taken by the company for the pipeline project by paying 5 times more than the actual value.

== See also ==
- Mumbai-Bangalore economic corridor
