= Rajim railway station =

Railway station in Chhattisgarh

Rajim

General information
- Location: SH 5, Nawapara Nagar, Raipur, Chhattisgarh; India
- Coordinates: 20.9699°N 81.8685°E
- Elevation: 307 metres (1,007 ft)
- System: Indian Railways station
- Owner: Indian Railways
- Operator: Raipur railway division
- Line: Abhanpur–Rajim branch line
- Platforms: 2
- Tracks: 4
- Connections: Auto stand

Construction
- Structure type: Standard (on-ground station)
- Parking: No
- Cycle facilities: No

Other information
- Status: Functioning
- Station code: RIM
- Fare zone: South East Central Railway

Services
Preceding station	Indian Railways	Following station
Manik Chauree Halt towards ?	South East Central Railway zone Abhanpur–Rajim branch line	Terminus
Location

Rajim railway station is a main railway station in Raipur district, Chhattisgarh. Its code is RIM. It serves Rajim village. The station consists of two platforms. The station lies on the Abhanpur–Rajim branch line of Bilaspur–Nagpur section.

== Major trains ==
- Abhanpur–Rajim NG Passenger
- Rajim–Kendri NG Passenger
