= Chennai Bangalore Industrial Corridor =

Planned infrastructure project in India

Location of Chennai and Bangalore and within India

The Chennai-Bangalore Industrial Corridor Project is an upcoming mega infrastructure project of Government of India. The corridor plans to come up along Chennai, Sriperumbudur, Ponnapanthangal, Ranipet, Suburbans of Vellore, Chittoor, Bangarupalem, Palamaner, Kuppam, Bangarpet, Hoskote and Bangalore. It is expected to boost commerce between south India and east Asia by enabling quicker movement of goods from these places to the Chennai and Ennore ports and recently it has been planned to be extended to Coimbatore city of Tamil Nadu and Kochi city of Kerala.

It is one of the five industrial corridors coming up in India under the aegis of National Industrial Corridor Development and Implementation Trust (NICDIT).

== Connectivity ==
In his Budget speech, finance minister of India said the project with assistance from the Japan International Cooperation Agency (JICA) will be developed in collaboration with the governments of three southern states. The Chennai-Bangalore industrial corridor is being modeled along the $100 billion Delhi-Mumbai Industrial Corridor (DMIC).

Two major backbone infrastructure projects are planned for the corridor, upgrading both the road and rail connectivity. These are Bangalore - Chennai Expressway and Bangalore - Chennai Dedicated Freight Corridor.

== Node 1: Ponneri (Tamil Nadu) ==
A Comprehensive Integrated Regional Master Plan for Chennai Bengaluru Industrial Corridor Final Report has been prepared by JICA. A detailed Master Plan for Ponneri Node has also been prepared by JICA.

== Node 2 & 3: Tumakuru & Krishnapatnam ==
A request for quote and request for proposal was put out for consultancy services of a detailed master planning and preliminary engineering for the Tumakuru and Krishnapatnam Node of the project.

== Extension to Kochi ==
After many requests of the Kerala government, the Centre has decided to extend the Chennai-Bengaluru industrial corridor to Kochi. The industrial corridor, as part of the national industrial corridor, will be extended through Coimbatore to Kochi. The National Industrial Corridor Development and Implementation Trust (NICDIT) intimated the Centre’s decision regarding this to the state government. Among the two Integrated Manufacturing Cluster (IMC) that will be developed as part of the Coimbatore-Kochi industrial corridor, one will be in Palakkad while the other will be in Salem, Tamil Nadu. Kerala’s Integrated Manufacturing Cluster will be coming up in the 100 kilometer stretch on either side of Kochi-Salem National Highway. The IMC will be focusing on sectors like electronics, food processing, Agriculture industries, IT and traditional industries. The Special Purpose Vehicle (SPV), jointly set up by the state government and the Centre, will be in charge and control of the IMC. An SPV is a separate legal entity that is protected from the parent company’s financial risks, including bankruptcy.

Sagarmala project and related capacity and infrastructure enhancements are expected make add to the capacity of this corridor.

== See also ==
- National Industrial Corridors of India
- Amritsar Delhi Kolkata Industrial Corridor
- Delhi Mumbai Industrial Corridor Project
- Mumbai-Bangalore economic corridor
- Visakhapatnam–Chennai Industrial Corridor
- Palakkad Industrial Smart City
