= Trans-Himalayan Multi-dimensional Connectivity Network =

Chinese government project

The Trans-Himalayan Multi-dimensional Connectivity Network (abbreviated as THMCN and sometimes referred to as the Trans-Himalayan network) is an economic corridor between Nepal and China and part of China's Belt and Road Initiative, a global development initiative that develops connectivity especially across Eurasia. During a state visit to Nepal in 2019, the corridor was hailed by Chinese President and General Secretary of the Communist Party Xi Jinping as changing Nepal "from a landlocked to a land-linked country."

== Infrastructure ==
The corridor consists of several transportation infrastructure projects. The flagship infrastructure project is the China–Nepal railway, which currently at the stage of feasibility study. A number of highway projects are to be implemented including the construction of a tunnel road and upgrading of the Araniko Highway, which was shut down after the Gorkha earthquake. The Araniko Highway ends at the border of the village of Kodari and the Chinese border crossing of Zhangmu. The border port is set for restoration under the initiative.

The projects also consist of internal improvements to Nepalese transport infrastructure including serving three north–south corridors of the country (Koshi Economic Corridor, Gandaki Economic Corridor and Karnali Economic Corridor). The intended projects include the Kathmandu-Pokhara-Lumbini extension of the China-Nepal railways and various highway projects in the Himalayan Valley.

=== Background (2017) ===
Nepal formally joined China’s Belt and Road Initiative (BRI) in May 2017 after signing a Memorandum of Understanding on cooperation in infrastructure, trade, and connectivity. This agreement established the institutional framework for expanding bilateral cooperation and laid the groundwork for subsequent proposals on cross-border connectivity between the two countries.

=== Proposal and early development (2018) ===
In June 2018, during Prime Minister K. P. Sharma Oli’s official visit to China, the two countries proposed the establishment of the Trans-Himalayan Multi-Dimensional Connectivity Network (THMCN). The initiative was conceived as a multi-sector connectivity framework encompassing transportation, energy, and communications infrastructure, with the objective of strengthening cross-border integration.

Both sides agreed to jointly develop the concept under the BRI framework, including potential cross-border railways, highways, and transmission networks aimed at improving trade and regional connectivity.

=== Elevation to flagship initiative (2019) ===
In October 2019, Chinese president Xi Jinping conducted a state visit to Nepal, during which the THMCN was elevated to a flagship bilateral initiative. During the visit, both sides emphasized the importance of enhancing connectivity and agreed to promote infrastructure cooperation across multiple sectors. The project was framed as a means to transform Nepal "from a landlocked to a land-linked country," reflecting its strategic importance in regional integration.

Agreements reached during the visit included expanded cooperation in railway construction, road connectivity, aviation infrastructure, and cross-border trade facilitation, positioning the network as a central pillar of bilateral relations.
