= Manik Chauree Halt railway station =

Railway station in Chhattisgarh

Manik Chauree Halt

General information
- Location: SH 5, Manikchauri, Raipur, Chhattisgarh; India
- Coordinates: 21.0048°N 81.7837°E
- Elevation: 307 metres (1,007 ft)
- System: Indian Railways station
- Owner: Indian Railways
- Operator: Raipur railway division
- Line: Abhanpur–Rajim branch line
- Platforms: 1
- Tracks: 4
- Connections: Auto stand

Construction
- Structure type: Standard (on-ground station)
- Parking: No
- Cycle facilities: No

Other information
- Status: Active
- Station code: MCF
- Fare zone: South East Central Railway

Services
Preceding station	Indian Railways	Following station
Abhanpur Junction towards ?	South East Central Railway zone Abhanpur–Rajim branch line	Rajim towards ?
Location

Manik Chauree Halt railway station is a minor railway station in Raipur district, Chhattisgarh. Its code is MCF. It serves Manik Chauree village. The station consists of 2 platforms. The station lies on the Abhanpur–Rajim branch line of Bilaspur–Nagpur section.

== Major trains ==
- Abhanpur–Rajim NG Passenger
- Rajim–Kendri NG Passenger
