= Abhanpur =

- Tehsil
- Location in Chhattisgarh, India Abhanpur (India)
- Coordinates: 21°3′10″N 81°44′44″E
- Country: India
- State: Chhattisgarh
- District: Raipur
- Elevation: 345 m (1,132 ft)

Population
  - Total: 242,089

Languages
  - Official: Hindi, Chhattisgarhi
- Time zone: UTC+5:30 (IST)
- PIN: 493661
- Vehicle registration: CG
- Climate: Aw

Abhanpur is a tehsil (administrative division) in Raipur District, Chhattisgarh, India. It is a part of the Naya Raipur township.

== Geography ==
Abhanpur is located about 28 km southeast of Raipur. Abhanpur Tehsil (or administrative block) has 105 villages and 2 Nagar Panchayats.

== Transport ==
National Highway 43 passes through Abhanpur. The nearest airport is Raipur Airport and the nearest railway station is Raipur Junction. A mini-train runs from Abhanpur towards Rajim. The upcoming Raipur–Visakhapatnam Expressway will start from Abhanpur and will terminate at Visakhapatnam. It is under construction since November 2022, and will be completed by the end of 2024.

== Economy ==
The primary activity is agriculture. The planned Naya Raipur market is expected to be located in Abhanpur.

== Demographics ==
Chhattisgarhi is the most spoken language.
