= Amritsar–Kolkata Industrial Corridor =

Economic corridor in India

Location of Amritsar, Delhi and Kolkata within India

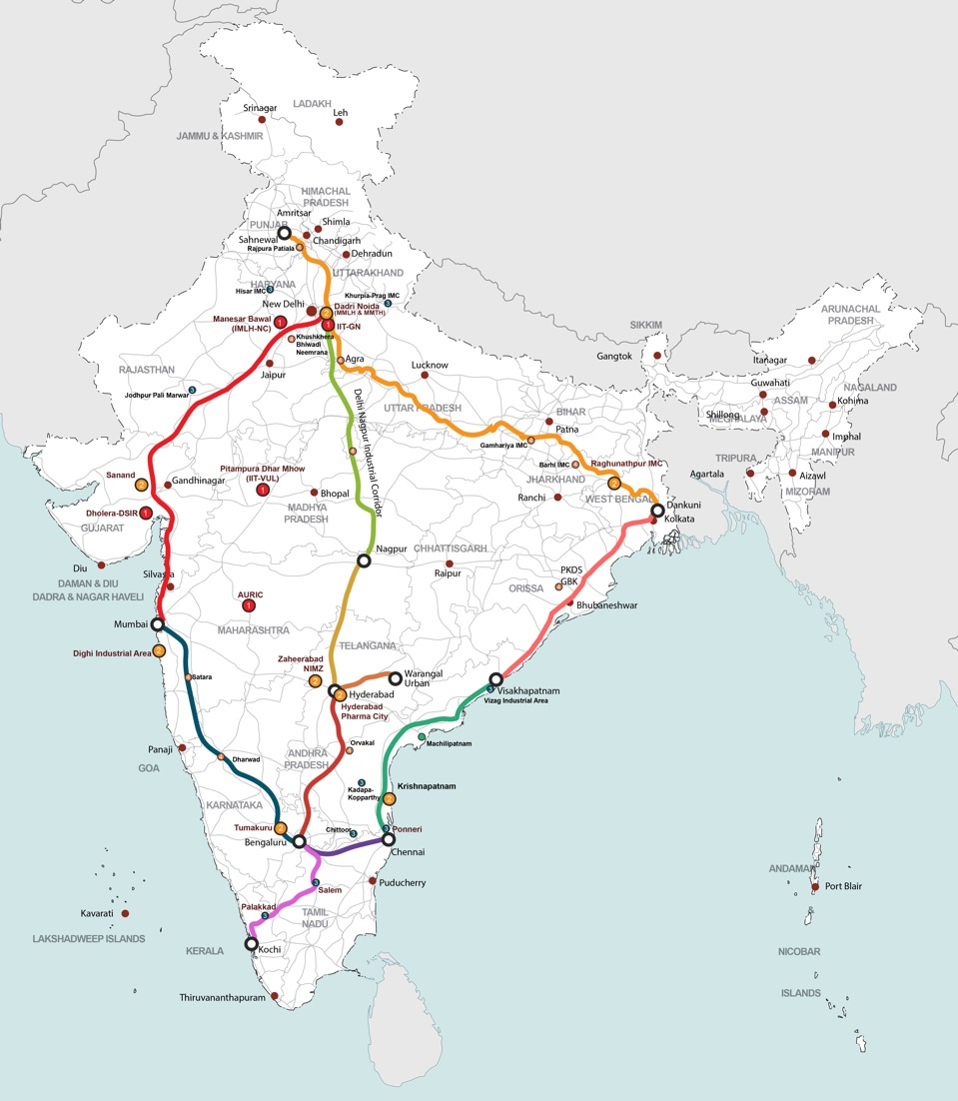
11 National Industrial Corridors of India.

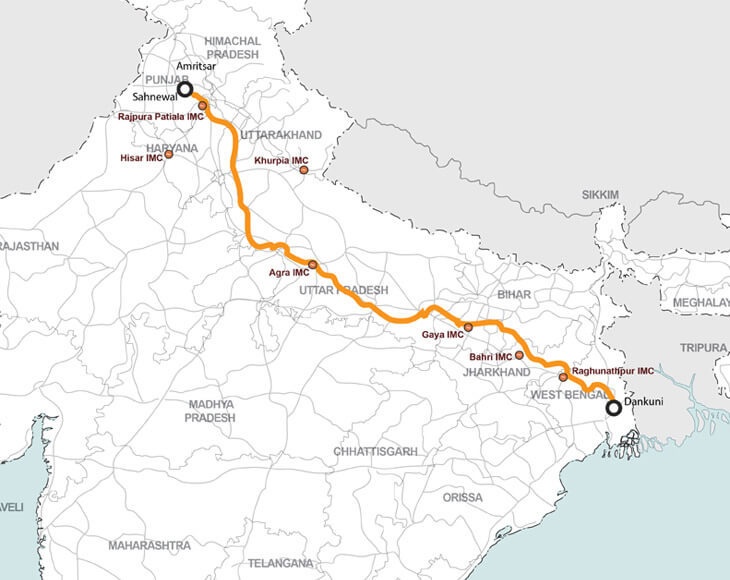
Amritsar Kolkata Industrial Corridor (AKIC) map.

The Amritsar Delhi Kolkata Industrial corridor (ADKIC) is a proposed economic corridor in India between the cities of Amritsar, Delhi and Kolkata, developed by the Government of India.

The project is aimed at developing an Industrial Zone spanning across seven states in India and 20 cities under these states. The project is intended to bring about major expansion of infrastructure and industry in the states along the route of the corridor.

The corridor encompasses one of the most densely populated regions in the world and houses about 40% of India's population. This is a region which needs a major push for industrialization and job creation.

== History ==
As of 20 January 2014, the Government of India had approved the project. In 2013-14, the Minister of Commerce and Industry, Piyush Goyal proposed the establishment of a ₹5,749 crore (US$680 million) fund for the first phase for boosting the manufacturing sector in the and to create millions of jobs.

== Details ==
=== States included ===
The ADKIC will be spread across 20 cities in seven states: Punjab, Haryana, Uttar Pradesh, Uttarakhand, Bihar, Jharkhand and West Bengal, extending from Ludhiana in Punjab to Dankuni near Kolkata . The cities which will covered by the ADKIC Project are Amritsar, Jalandhar, Ludhiana, Ambala, Saharanpur, Delhi, Roorkee, Haridwar, Dehradun, Meerut, Muzaffarnagar, Bareilly, Aligarh, Kanpur, Lucknow, Allahabad, Varanasi, Gaya, Hazaribagh, Bokaro Steel City, Dhanbad, Asansol, Durgapur, Burdwan and Kolkata. The corridor is built along the 1,839 km long Eastern Dedicated Freight Corridor (EDFC) between Ludhiana and Kolkatta, and will leverage the Inland Waterway System being developed along National Waterway 1 which extends from Allahabad to Haldia. The IMG has also proposed to integrate the existing highway network.

=== IMC ===
Following IMC (Integrated Manufacturing Clusters) have been approved by the NICDC (National Industrial Corridor Development Corporation) for this corridor each of which will be developed under separate SPV (special purpose vehicle) with 49% NICDC stake and 51% stake for the respective state:

1. Punjab: Rajpura Patiala IMC, 1099 acres.
2. Haryana: Hisar IMC, 2988 acres, the largest IMC on AKIC.
3. Uttarakhand: Khurpia Udham Singh Nagar IMC, 1002 acres.
4. Uttar Pradesh: Agra IMC, 1098 acres.
5. Uttar Pradesh: Prayagraj IMC, 352 acres, approved in 2024.
6. Bihar: Gaya IMC, 1670 acres.
7. Jharkhand: Barhi Hazaribagh IMC, 2500 acres, land not available as of July 2025 hence new location being sought.
8. West Bengal: Raghunathpur Purulia IMC, 2483 acres.

=== Connectivity ===
- Eastern Dedicated Freight Corridor, Ludhiana to Kolkata, exists.
- National Waterway 1, Allahabad to Haldia/Kolkatta, exists.
- Delhi–Dehradun Expressway, exists.
- Hisar–Rewari Expressway, under-planning, needs to be expedited.
- Hisar–Rewari Expressway, under-planning, needs to be expedited, see also Expressways in Haryana.

== See also ==
- National Industrial Corridors of India
- Delhi–Mumbai Industrial Corridor
- Chennai Bangalore Industrial Corridor
- Mumbai-Bangalore economic corridor
- Visakhapatnam–Chennai Industrial Corridor
