= South Asia Subregional Economic Cooperation =

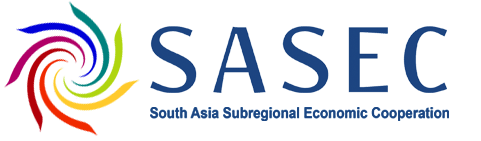

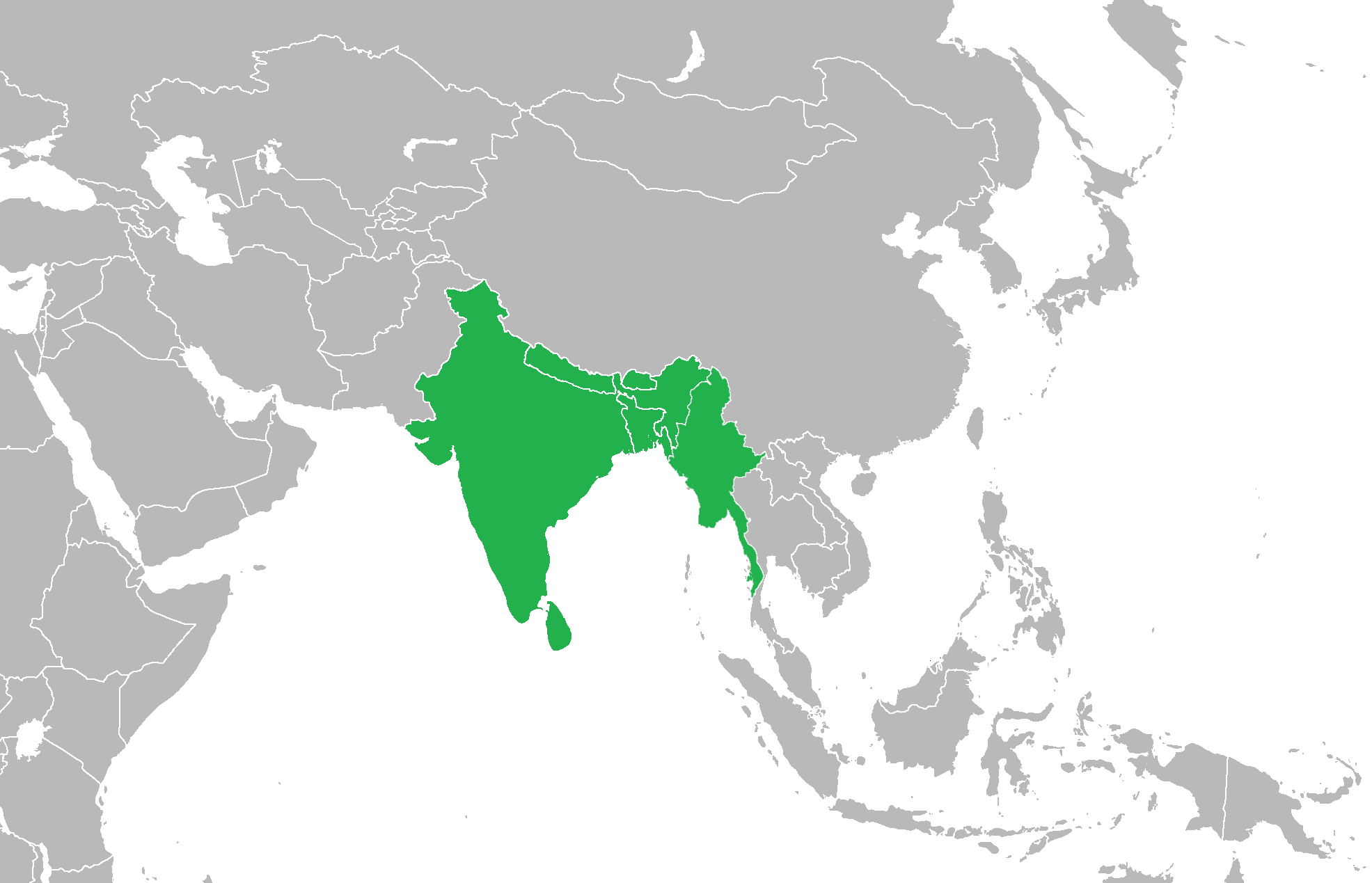
- Abbreviation: SASEC
- Founded: 2001
- Type: Subregional program
- Headquarters: Manila, Philippines
- Region served: South Asia; Southeast Asia
- Members: Bangladesh, Bhutan, India, Maldives, Myanmar, Nepal, Sri Lanka
- Website: http://www.sasec.asia

The South Asia Subregional Economic Cooperation (SASEC) Program, set up in 2001, brings together Bangladesh, Bhutan, India, Maldives, Myanmar, Nepal, and Sri Lanka in a project-based partnership to promote regional prosperity by improving cross-border connectivity, boosting trade among member countries, and strengthening regional economic cooperation. As of September 2025, SASEC countries have implemented 61 regional projects worth over $23 billion in the energy, transport, trade facilitation, economic corridor development, information and communications technology (ICT), health, and tourism sectors. The Manila, Philippines-based Asian Development Bank (ADB) serves as the Secretariat for the SASEC member countries.

== Background ==
South Asia is one of the least economically integrated regions in the world and has much to gain from developing and expanding regional transport networks and energy links.

South Asia's intraregional trade is considerably lower than in other regions. In 2010, trade between South Asian countries accounted for only 4.3% of the region's total trade. This is partly because transport systems in South Asia have been developed with primarily national priorities in mind, rather than with a view to boosting trade by improving cross-border connectivity.

As a result, the region has invested insufficiently in critical infrastructure, and cross-border trading systems suffer from a lack of uniformity and compatibility. Other barriers also hold back trade between South Asia countries, such as limited transit arrangements, lack of automated customs procedures, and lengthy administration procedures.

South Asian nations have varied but uneven energy resources. However, none has realized the full potential of their energy sources because of insufficient investment in energy infrastructure. The dominance of certain fuel types in certain countries – coal in India, gas in Bangladesh, and hydropower in Bhutan and Nepal – leaves them vulnerable to import dependence. There is also a need to develop renewable energy resources to increase climate change resilience in Maldives and Sri Lanka. This situation could be eased by strengthening cross-border energy networks and trade. Better telecommunications connections would also expand personal and business links, increasing trade at all levels

== History ==
In 1996, Bangladesh, Bhutan, India, and Nepal, a subset of the South Asian Association for Regional Cooperation (SAARC), formed the South Asian Growth Quadrangle (SAGQ) aimed at boosting cooperation in environment, energy and power, trade and investment, transport, and tourism. SAARC endorsed SAGQ in 1997. The initial four member countries then requested ADB assistance to promote economic cooperation in the subregion, leading to the creation of the SASEC Program in 2001. Maldives and Sri Lanka were welcomed as new member countries in May 2014. Myanmar became the seventh member of SASEC in February 2017.

The organization adopted the SASEC operational plan in November 2016 and launched its subregional strategic development road map in April 2017. An update to the operational plan was released in February 2020.

== SASEC priority areas of cooperation ==
In 2005, the SASEC countries agreed on priority sectors for investment and coordinated action: transport, trade facilitation, and energy. In 2016, the SASEC countries approved the SASEC Operational Plan 2016–2025, a 10-year strategic roadmap, which introduced economic corridor development (ECD) as a fourth sectoral area of focus. SASEC also supports regional initiatives in ICT.

- Transport — SASEC aims to put in place the critical multi-modal transport networks that will enhance intraregional trade and investment in the subregion and, in turn, boost economic growth. SASEC works to strengthen road, rail, and air links, as well as developing port infrastructure to match the needs of the region's growing economies, and to support the SAARC transport corridor network.
- Trade Facilitation — SASEC is helping speed up the time and reduce the costs of trading across borders throughout the subregion. Regional SASEC trade facilitation initiatives are creating modern customs administrations that are compliant with the terms and provisions of the Revised Kyoto Convention, streamlined and transparent cross-border trade regulations and procedures, and improved information and services for the private sector.
- Energy — SASEC is working to improve energy access and security in the region by developing essential infrastructure, and promoting intraregional power trade to reduce costs and import dependence. SASEC energy initiatives focus on renewable energy.
- Economic Corridor Development — SASEC is promoting synergies and linkages between economic corridors across SASEC countries to optimize development gains, including industrial growth and competitiveness, the creation of high-quality jobs, increased productivity, and the strengthening existing value chains.

== Projects ==
SASEC investment since 2001 amounts to more than $13 billion (figure as of June 2020), mostly in the transport sector. ADB has provided $6.35 billion in loans and grants to the SASEC countries for regional programming initiatives. Member countries have contributed more than $4.7 billion worth of investments. Projects include hard and soft infrastructure priorities, identified by the SASEC governments. SASEC follows a flexible, multi-track approach to project implementation, where member countries work together to ensure that projects implemented at the national level are coordinated across borders to deliver positive results at a wider regional level.

Sector	Number of Projects	Total Project Cost (US$ mlll)
Transport (road, rail, air, sea)	41	$11,200
Energy	12	$1,580
Trade Facilitation	3	$81
ICT	2	$21
Economic Corridor Development	3	$697
TOTAL	61	$13,579

(figures as of June 2020)

ADB also supports the goals of the SASEC Program through the provision of national and regional technical assistance funding. Since 2001, it has implemented more than $233 million worth of technical assistance projects to create regional institutions and boost technical and other skills. To ensure international best practice and technical knowledge is made available to the SASEC governments, ADB often collaborates with other partners such as the World Customs Organization, the United Nations Economic and Social Commission for Asia and the Pacific, and the United Nations Conference on Trade and Development (ASYCUDA).

== Meetings ==
Secretaries and Joint Secretaries of Ministries of Finance of SASEC countries meet annually at the Nodal Officials Meeting, often held on the sidelines of ADB's Annual General Meeting. Nodal officials review and provide strategic direction for cooperation under SASEC. Four SASEC technical working groups (transport, trade facilitation, energy, and ICT) represented by the Joint Secretary or Director General of each SASEC country, meet regularly to review strategic priorities and progress or projects.

The Meeting of Bangladesh, Bhutan, India, and Nepal (BBIN) Transport Ministers on Regional Road Transport Connectivity finalized and endorsed the BBIN Motor Vehicles Agreement (MVA) and proposed a work plan to ensure its speedy and effective implementation on 15 June 2015 in Thimphu, Bhutan. The BBIN MVA is a landmark framework agreement to facilitate the seamless flow of passenger, personal and cargo vehicular traffic between and among the BBIN countries.

Bhutan withdrew from BBIN citing pollution as the reason.

== SASEC Secretariat ==
ADB serves as the SASEC Secretariat, working with member governments to help implement SASEC projects and initiatives and to provide technical support. The SASEC Secretariat also coordinates capacity-building activities and works to identify necessary technical organizations and development partners to strengthen training and knowledge-building programs for member countries. It provides overall coordination and administrative and logistical assistance to the member countries. The SASEC Secretariat is reaching out to more SASEC members and those interested in the benefits of regional cooperation through Twitter and Facebook.

== See also ==
- Asian Development Bank (ADB)
- Bangladesh Bhutan India Nepal Initiative
- South Asian Association for Regional Cooperation
- India's Look-East connectivity projects and ASEAN
- East Coast Economic Corridor
- Visakhapatnam–Chennai Industrial Corridor
