= East–West Economic Corridor =

The East–West Economic corridor is an economic development program initiated in order to promote development and integration of 5 Southeast Asian countries, namely: Myanmar, Thailand, Laos, Cambodia and Vietnam. The concept was agreed upon in 1998 at the Ministerial Conference of the Greater Mekong Subregion, organized in Manila, the Philippines. This corridor became operational on December 12, 2006.

The economic corridor is created based on a road of 1,450 km with the west end at port city of Mawlamyine (Myanmar), crossing Kayin Division, Thai provinces of Tak, Sukhothai, Phitsanulok, Phetchabun, Khon Kaen, Kalasin and Mukdahan, the Laotian province of Savannakhet, and the Vietnamese provinces of Quảng Trị, and city of Huế and Đà Nẵng as the east end. From Myanmar it is further connected to India via India–Myanmar–Thailand Trilateral Highway which is being upgraded, with most part already completed and remaining upgrade will be completed by 2020.

By using the East–West Economic Corridor, the travel time between Bangkok and Yangon is three days, compared with the two to three weeks needed for conventional marine transportation via the Straits of Malacca.

== Corridor development ==
=== Economic impact ===
Tariffs for Thailand, Cambodia, Laos, Myanmar and Vietnam will be abolished by 2018, all of have the cross-border transport agreement to simplify logistics and customs procedures. These 5 nations with combined population of 250 million, have US$32 billion trade with each other (2016). India is individually negotiating a road vehicle agreement with these nations. Asian Development Bank study shows that the improved road and rail links, elimination of tariffs and non-tariff barriers, will result in a benefit of at least $568 billion to South Asian and South East Asian nations.

=== Immigration and customs ===
All the border crossings from India, Myanmar, Thailand, Cambodia to Vietnam already have the integrated immigration and customs checkpost that also allow foreign tourists with evisas.

=== Road highway upgrade ===
Road network from India to Vietnam exists, which is being upgraded. Bangkok to Cambodian Capital city of Phenom Phen road upgrade was already complete. Vietnam and Cambodia signed a MoU to upgrade the 195 km long Ho Chi Minh City and Phnom Penh highway. Second bridge to Mae Sot will open in 2018.

=== Rail connectivity development ===
Rail network from India to Vietnam has several missing links, which are in the various stages of being planned or constructed.

== Gallery ==
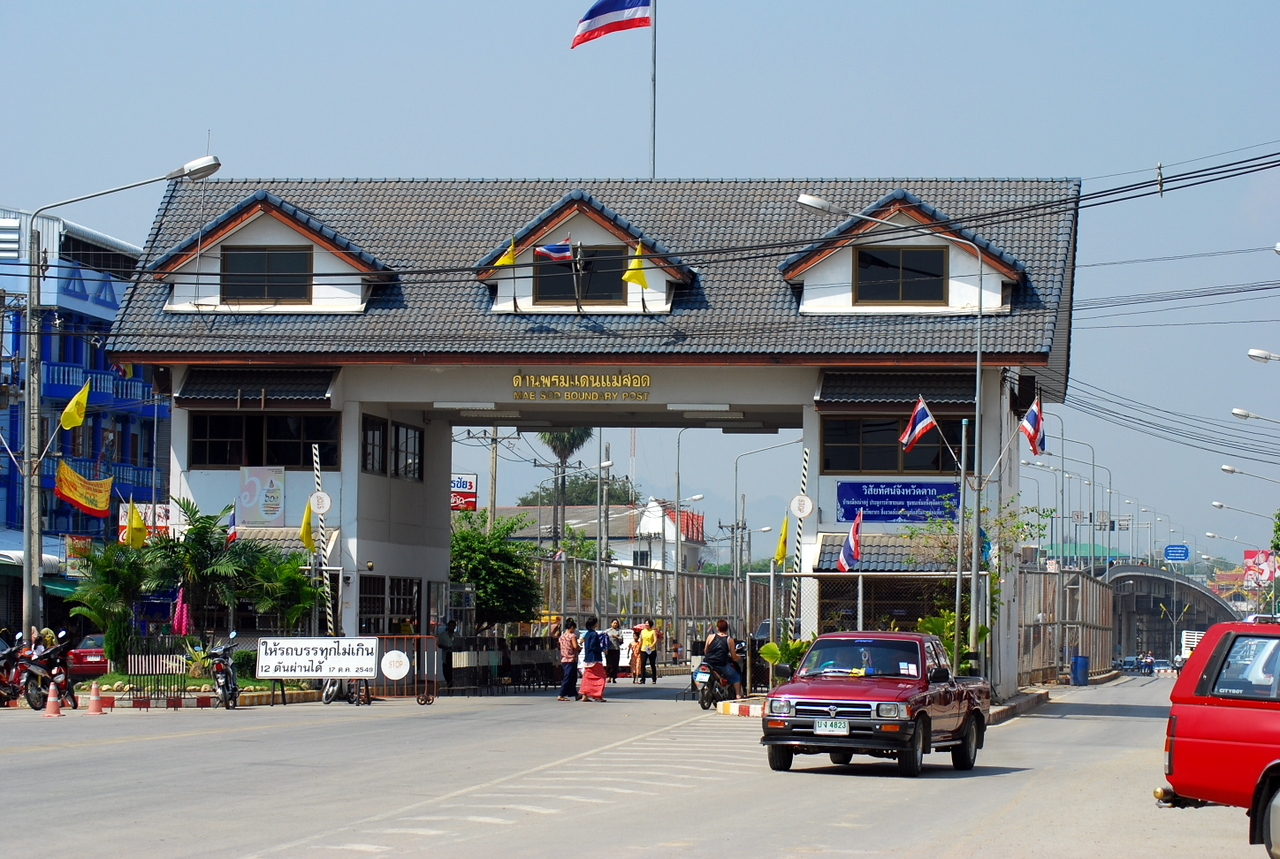
A gate on the Thai side of the Thai-Myanmar Friendship Bridge, linking Myanmar's Kayin State with Thailand's Tak Province.

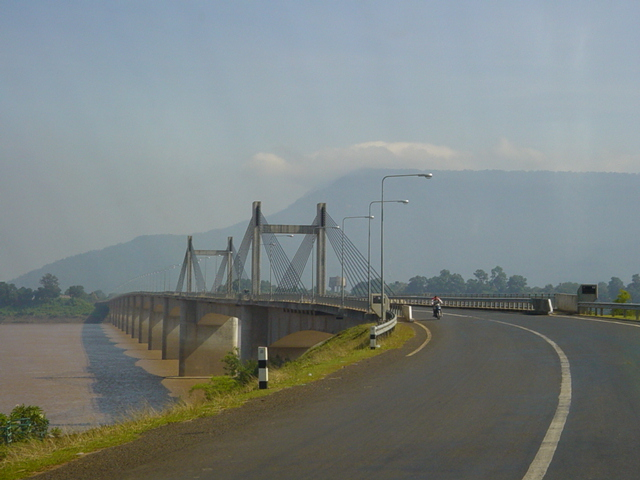
This bridge over the Mekong River connects Northeast Thailand and Southern Laos, an important transport project of the Corridor.

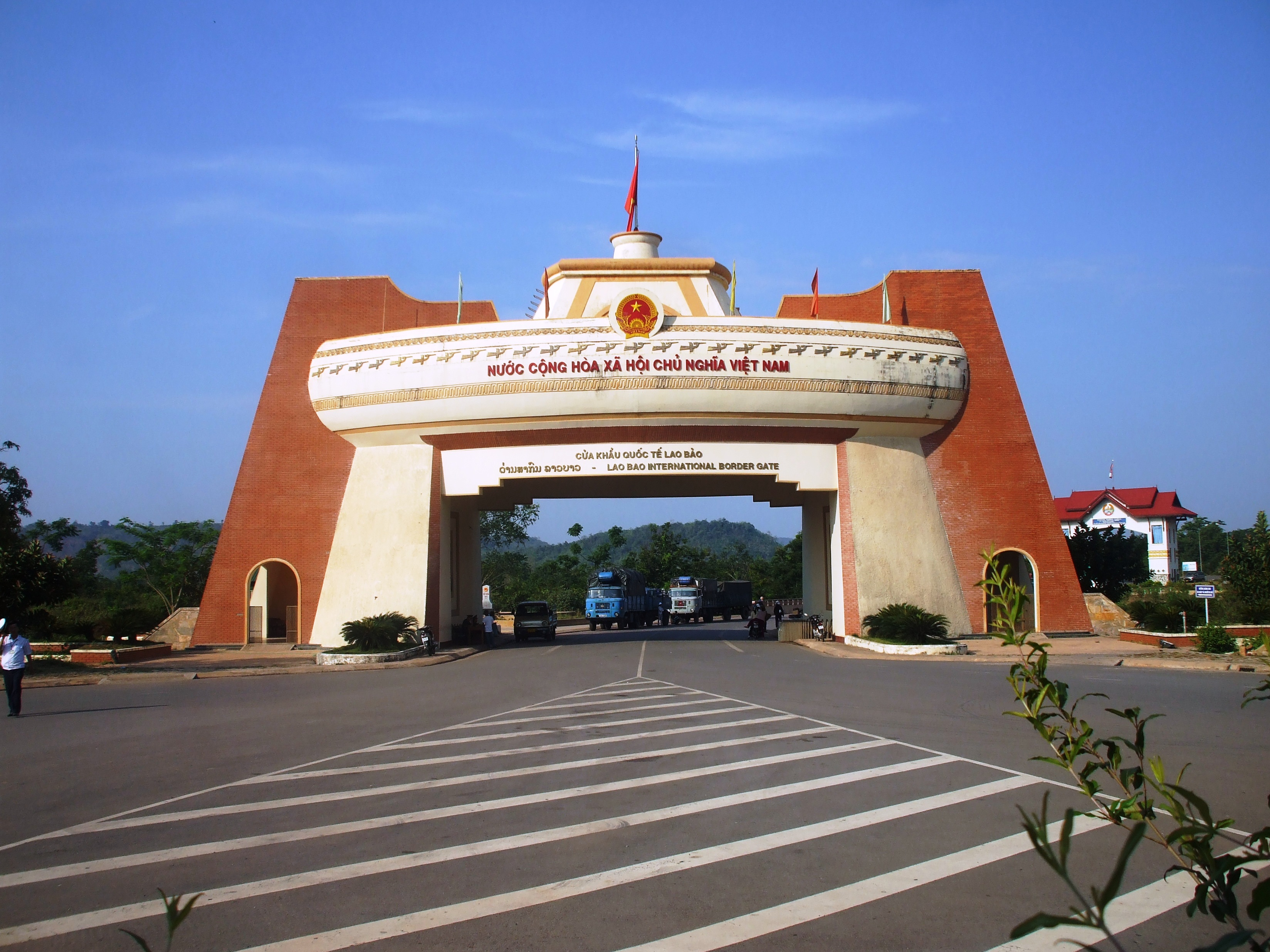
The Lao Bảo border gate (to Lao P.D.R) in Quảng Trị Province, Việt Nam.

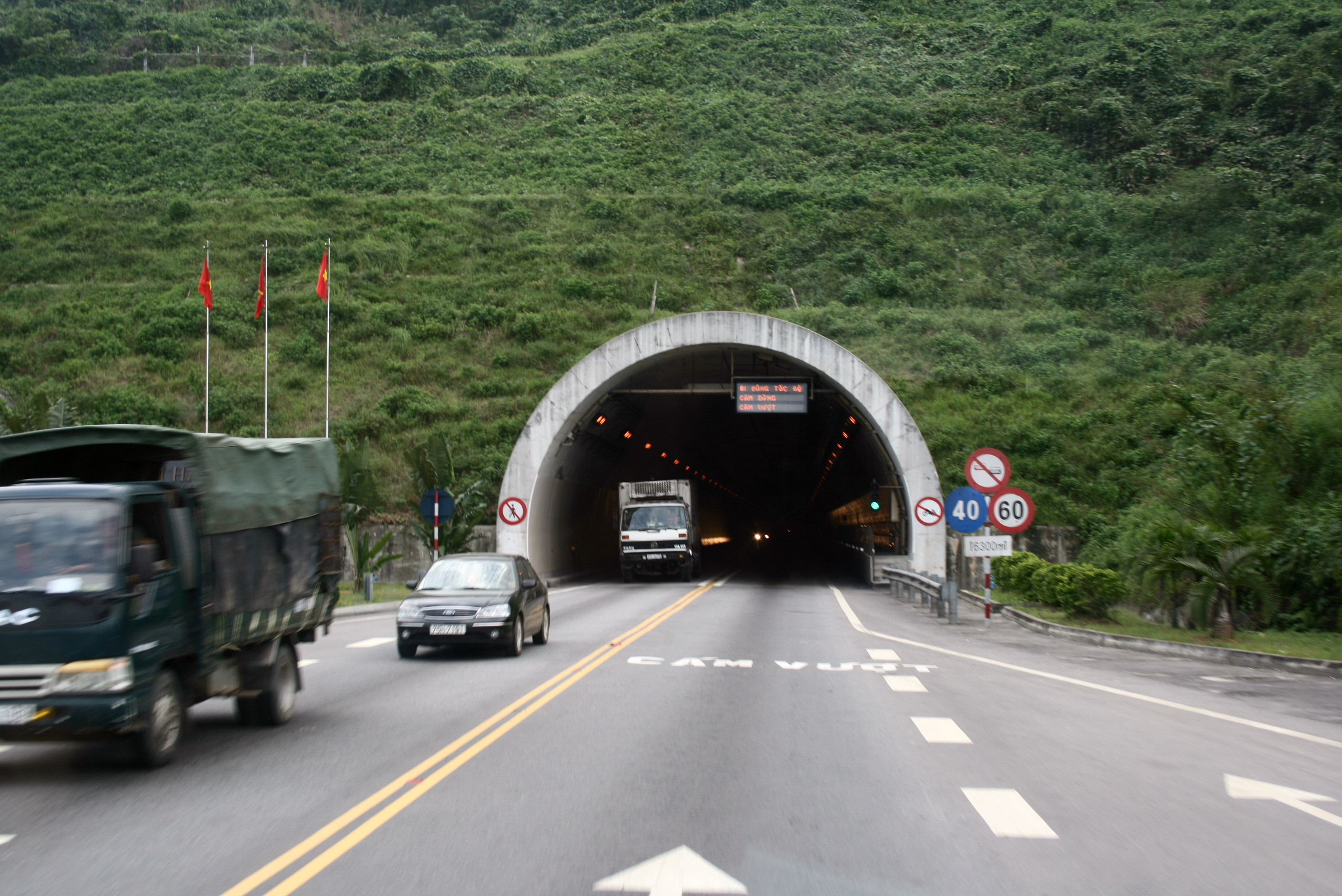
A tunnel through the Hai Van mountain range in Vietnam opens the way to sea ports in the South China Sea.
