= Industrial corridor =

Region of focused infrastructure spending

An industrial corridor is a package of infrastructure spending allocated to a specific geographical area, with the intent to stimulate industrial development.

An industrial corridor aims to create an area with a cluster of manufacturing or another industry. Such corridors are often created in areas that have pre-existing infrastructure, such as ports, highways and railroads. These modalities are arranged such that an "arterial" modality, such as a highway or railroad, receives "feeder" roads or railways. Concerns when creating corridors include correctly assessing demand and viability, transport options for goods and workers, land values, and economic incentives for companies.

Infrastructure corridors are transportation systems designed to facilitate the flow of goods, services, knowledge and capital. The development of infrastructure corridors is often a link between rural areas and urban growth. In the 21st century, industrial corridors are often viewed as opportunities for jobs and economic development in a region. Infrastructure can bring enhanced prospects to underdeveloped regions, longer-term economic growth, and international competition.

There are infrastructure corridors in both developing world countries such as South Africa and Brazil in addition to advanced countries such as the United States and Canada. The increased movement from rural areas to metropolitan areas will advance industrial corridors in population centers.

== United States ==
=== Chicago ===
Southeast Chicago has historically been the location for significant and intensive manufacturing in the city, focusing on the production of steel. The Chicago region is the leading rail hub on the continent and has the largest inland intermodal port in the United States. The region also has a highly developed highway system, with access to more than ten interstate highways; a Port district and river system that connects to the Great Lakes, Mississippi River, and Atlantic Ocean.

With nearly 250 million square feet of industrial space, the City of Chicago's industrial inventory accounts for more than 20 percent of the total industrial inventory in the region. Chicago's industrial corridors constitute the city's primary resource of space for industrial development and encompass about 12 percent of City land with over 16,935 acres zoned primarily for manufacturing.

== India ==
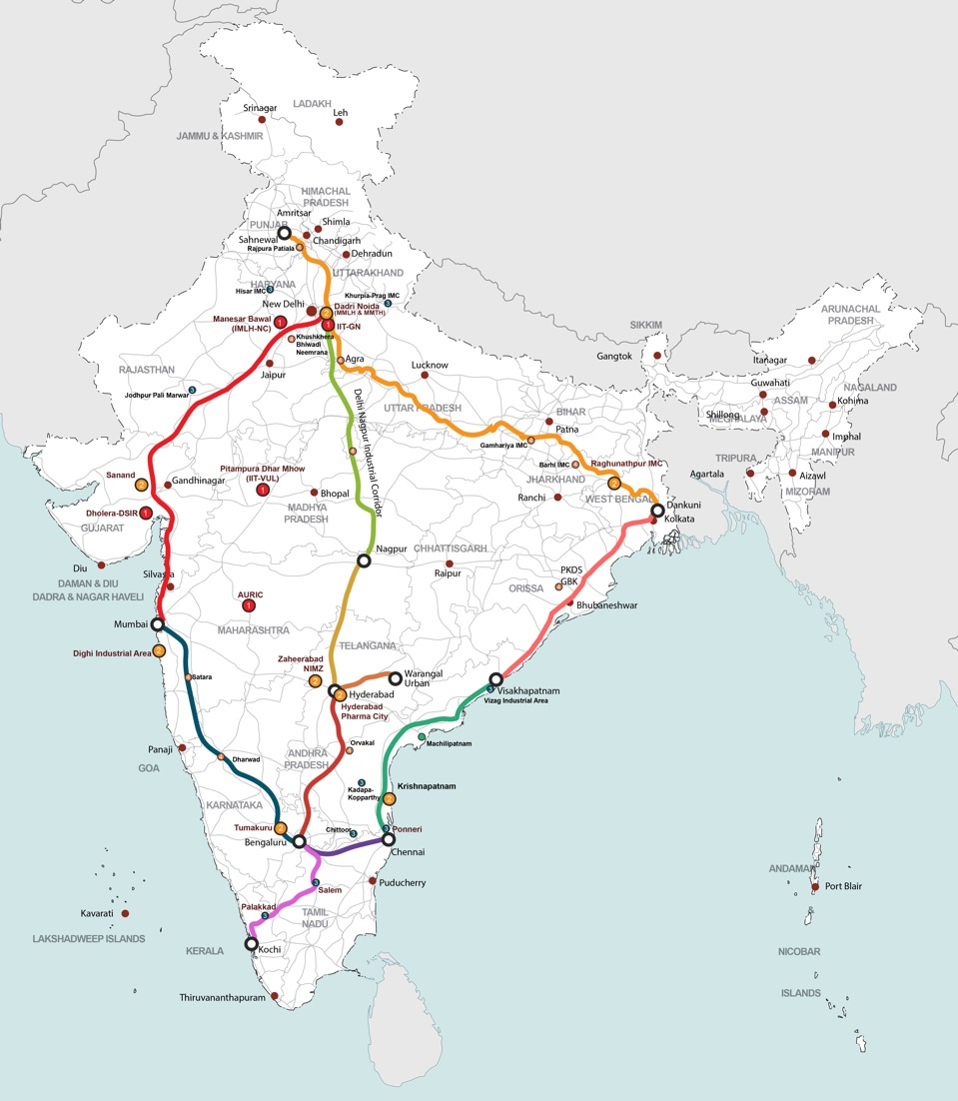
11 National Industrial Corridors of India.

There are 11 National Industrial Corridors (NIC) and numerous state level industrial corridors under PSU named National Industrial Corridor Development Corporation Limited (NICDC). The NIC's in India are as follows:

1. Delhi–Mumbai Industrial Corridor (DMIC): DMIC with Delhi–Mumbai Expressway and Western Dedicated Freight Corridor as its backbone, is intended to increase economic efficiency in the region and increase international competition. It aims to create smart, sustainable industrial cities with high speed, high-capacity connectivity provided by the Western Dedicated Freight Corridor (DFC) to reduce logistic costs. The corridor will reduce the travel time for containers from 50 h, by the existing freight train, to 17 h by a proposed freight corridor and approximately 14 days by road to 14 hours by the proposed freight corridor. These corridors are expected to improve economic activities in the region and increase the national competitiveness overall. This project incorporates Nine Mega Industrial zones of about 200-250 sq. km., high speed freight line, three ports, and six airports, a six-lane intersection-free expressway connecting Mumbai to Delhi and a 4000 MW power plant. The Delhi-Mumbai Industrial Corridor is a mega infrastructure project of USD 90 billion. Funds for the projects are from the Indian government, Japanese loans, investment by Japanese firms and through Japan depository receipts issued by Indian companies.
2. Delhi–Nagpur Industrial Corridor (DNIC)
3. Amritsar–Kolkata Industrial Corridor (AKIC)
4. Chennai Bangalore (Bengaluru) Industrial Corridor (CBIC)
5. Extension of CBIC to Kochi (via Coimbatore)
6. Vizag–Chennai Industrial Corridor (VCIC)
7. Bengaluru–Mumbai Industrial Corridor (BMIC)
8. Odisha Economic Corridor (OEC)
9. Hyderabad Nagpur Industrial Corridor (HNIC)
10. Hyderabad Warangal Industrial Corridor (HWIC)
11. Hyderabad Bengaluru Industrial Corridor (HBIC)

East Coast Economic Corridor is the name for the combination of Coastal India NICs.

Some of the state industrial corridors in India are:

- Gujarat:
  - Udhna–Palsana Industrial Corridor (UPIC)
- Haryana:
  - Anupgarh–Hisar–Pithoragarh Industrial Corridor (AHPIC)
  - Bathinda–Hisar–Alwar–Korba–Raigarh Industrial Corridor (BHAKRIC)
  - Ludhiana–Hisar–Jaipur-Kota Industrial Corridor (LHJKIC)
  - Trans-Haryana Industrial Corridor (THIC)
- Uttar Pradesh:
  - Delhi–Dehradun Industrial Corridor (DDIC)

== Africa ==
Africa, having long been an underinvested continent is now home to some of the world's fastest growing economies. The urban population is forecast to grow by over 60% by 2060. Africa was home to 17 percent of the world population in 2020, and is expected to have 26 percent of the global population in 2050. Likewise, Africa's demand for electricity will quadruple from 2010 to 2040.

Across Africa, regional development banks invested the most in development corridors (30.8%), with the African Development Bank funding the majority (24.3%) of all projects. Outside of Africa, the regional development banks that invested in the most projects are the Export-Import Bank of China (3.8%), the European Investment Bank (2.8%) and the Arab Bank for Economic Development in Africa (1.2% ea.). National governments funded about 29.8% of all projects. Development corridors can widen inequalities between stakeholders who are not party to the planning process but affected by it. The high financing costs for industrial corridors can also leave an unsustainable burden of debt, particularly for many of the African countries with high debt service costs.

== Environmental effects ==
Industrial zone development corridors can lead to significant biodiversity loss, habitat fragmentation, pollution, spread invasive species, increase illegal logging, poaching and fires, severely affect river deltas and coastal and marine ecosystems, and consume large volumes of greenhouse gas intensive products such as steel and cement.

=== Air pollution and health effects ===
==== Mexico ====
The population in this region is exposed to a multipollutant environment, including high levels of sulfur dioxide, submicrometric particles, and black carbon. Additionally, frequent adverse meteorological conditions in the morning may exacerbate acute and chronic exposition to these pollutants.

==== Korea ====
A study based in five Korean cities found that found that the incidence of lung cancer increased by approximately three times among residents living within 2 km of a petrochemical plant. Additionally, the risk of lung cancer was significantly higher among residents living in industrial complexes than that in the control area even after adjusting for age, sex, smoking, occupational exposure, education, and BMI. Other health concerns were found to include a 40% increased risk of acute eye disorder in the industrial area compared with the control area. The prevalence of the risks of lung and uterine cancers in the industrial area was statistically significantly higher at 3.45 and 1.88 times, respectively.

== Challenges ==
Challenges with planning and implementing, lack of clarity and consistency of national objectives and standards leads to industrial corridors varying in characteristics between countries and jurisdictions. Moreover, general challenges may include: mixed access to designations, complex and inflexible approval processes, need for robust and integrated decision-making, efficiency and adequacy of the land acquisition process, financing infrastructure development, and accurately forecasting usage (esp. infrastructure).

Additional challenges within a region can include regional instability and geopolitical shifts, isolation of corridor from existing economic activities, topographic challenges, lack of skilled labor, inconsistent quality of work, and high maintenance costs.

== See also ==
- Economic corridor
- Industrial park
