= Visakhapatnam–Chennai Industrial Corridor =

Part of India's first coastal corridor

Visakhapatnam–Chennai Industrial Corridor (VCIC), also Vizag–Chennai Industrial Corridor, is a key part of the East Coast Economic Corridor (ECEC), India's first coastal corridor. VCIC is aligned with the Golden Quadrilateral and is poised to play a critical role in driving India’s Act East Policy and Make in India campaign. The nearly 800-kilometer corridor links India with the Association of Southeast Asian Nations (ASEAN) and East Asian economies that form the bedrock of global manufacturing economy. The corridor traverses nine districts of the state of Andhra Pradesh. VCIC intends to complement the ongoing efforts of the Government of Andhra Pradesh (GoAP) to enhance industrial growth and create high quality jobs.

VCIC supports Government of India (GOI)'s strategy to develop industrial corridors of international standards for expanding its manufacturing and services sectors, and creating modern urban centers connected by state-of-the-art infrastructure. GOI has selected the Asian Development Bank (ADB) as the lead partner for developing the ECEC, which will run from Kolkata to Kanyakumari, encompassing the four states of Andhra Pradesh, Tamil Nadu, Odisha, and West Bengal. Due to its vast scope, ECEC is being implemented in a phased manner, with VCIC as the first phase. The conceptualization and development of VCIC has received major support from ADB, which carried out analytical work determining the kind of infrastructure and institutional investments necessary to drive manufacturing-led growth in consultation with the Department of Industrial Policy and Promotion, GOI.

== Background ==
While India has seen a rapid structural transformation and achieved strong economic growth for the past two decades, it must continue to create economic opportunities for its large labor force, which is increasing by about 12 million a year, to sustain economic growth and realize its demographic dividend. One pressing policy challenge is to create more productive and well-paying jobs in the manufacturing sector, which contributes about 16% to gross domestic product (GDP) and 12% to employment each year. By comparison, the manufacturing sectors of the People’s Republic of China, Malaysia, Thailand, and Viet Nam account for nearly 25% or more of GDP.

== VCIC as a Critical Component of India’s Coastal Corridor Development ==
VCIC’s long coastline and strategically located ports allow development of multiple international gateways to connect India with global value chains (GVCs) in Southeast and East Asia. VCIC aligns with the national objectives of expanding the domestic market and supports India’s port-led industrialization strategy (Sagar Mala initiative). While India’s trade with East and Southeast Asia has increased at a rapid pace in the past decade, the bulk of this trade is done through the ports on the country’s west coast. This is largely due to lack of efficient transport networks linking the production clusters in northern and central India to ports on the east coast, and insufficient container capacities at the ports to handle the volume of trade flowing to East and Southeast Asia.

== VCIC Development Strategy ==
The strategy to develop VCIC is part of the plan to achieve accelerated development and regional industry agglomeration in the focus state. Regional industry agglomeration could be achieved by attracting companies in the value chain of other companies already based in the corridor, attracting particular industries that the corridor provides with geographical advantages, or building and maintaining advanced infrastructure to support industries.

== Industrial Transformation in VCIC ==
The objective of industrial transformation is to increase the manufacturing sectors, improve labor productivity, and enhance international competitiveness. To achieve these objectives, it is necessary to identify the right set of industries for promotion. A detailed analysis identified these industries: pharmaceuticals, auto and auto components, textiles, metallurgy, chemicals and petrochemicals, food processing, and electronics. Besides identifying the right set of industries, connectivity infrastructure, logistics facilities, urban connectivity, and skilled manpower availability emerge as the key success factors from benchmarking globally successful industrial hubs. On the software side, regulations and their implementation mechanisms are critical for realizing the full economic potential of any industrial corridor.

== Industrial Nodes in VCIC ==
Industrial nodes are an integral component of economic corridor development. When equipped with comprehensive infrastructure support and a business-friendly environment, nodes can serve as hubs geared to cradle industries. Through a node selection process, four industrial nodes were identified:

1. Visakhapatnam Node
2. Kakinada Node
3. Gannavaram-Kankipadu Node
4. Yerpedu-Srikalahasti Node

== Infrastructure Development in VCIC ==
The node-based industrialization strategy targets to achieve regional and global competitiveness. Infrastructure development is one of the most important levers needed to attain this core objective. The focus has been on assessing the current state of infrastructure, both in terms of quantity and quality across categories, and identifying critical capacity gaps and other issues.

GoAP in November 2017 introduced a legislative bill pertaining to the development of industrial corridors across the state. The bill established a new Andhra Pradesh Industrial Corridor Development Authority (APICDA) as the nodal body headquartered at the new state capital of Amaravati to implement the industrial corridor projects. The chief minister heads the new authority and the minister for industries minister is its member-secretary. An executive committee is to be constituted and a commissioner appointed as the nodal officer to manage the APICDA’s activities and oversee its functioning. The authority will look into development of nodes as part of the Visakhapatnam–Chennai Industrial Corridor (VCIC) and Chennai-Bengaluru Industrial Corridor (CBIC). Main functions of the board is to procure, acquire and have landholdings within the node. It will take up the planning, development, operation, maintenance, management and regulation of industrial corridors in the state. The authority will take up developing master plans in the nodes, facilitate investments. It may also raise funds from market, levy user charges directly or indirectly through any private sector participant. The authority will also have powers to float special purpose vehicles.

== Institutions and Regulations in VCIC ==
Beyond investments in physical infrastructure, the regulatory framework needs to be changed to improve the investment climate and provide ease of logistics. This can be done by implementing technology; providing single window clearance; reducing burden of inspections for starting, operating and closing business; as well as easing logistical burden of industries by providing integrated check posts and bringing in uniformity on entry taxes and documentation.

In July 2018, Andhra Pradesh, with a score of 98.42 per cent, topped the "ease of doing business" ranking among Indian states prepared by the World Bank and the Department of Industrial Policy and Promotion (DIPP). In the prior year, Andhra Pradesh and Telangana had jointly topped the same rankings. Parameters for the rankings include construction permit, labor regulation, environmental registration, access to information, land availability, and single window system. DIPP collaborates with the World Bank in conducting an annual reform exercise for all states and union territories under the Business Reform Action Plan.

== Managing urbanization in VCIC ==
Industrialization and urbanization have generally proceeded together in developing economies. However, many new industrial locations in India failed to have planned urban developments including housing, and as a result, haphazard development has mushroomed around these locations. VCIC aims to synchronize industrialization and urbanization to prevent scattered industrialization and haphazard urban development by providing adequate physical and social infrastructure in urban centers to meet workers’ quality-of-life needs. Model developments such as Sri City in Andhra Pradesh and the Dholera Special Investment Region in Gujarat offer a way forward in reconciling urbanization and industrial development.

== VCIC to Promote Regional Integration ==
Most Asian economies – particularly Southeast Asia and East Asia – have grown by trading with their neighbors. By contrast, South Asia still lags behind in trading with its neighbors. In fact, South Asia has remained one of the least economically integrated regions in the world. In 2015, while intraregional trade of East Asia and ASEAN amounted to $2,837 billion and $564 billion, respectively, South Asian Association for Regional Cooperation (SAARC) countries traded a merely $49 billion worth among each other. SAARC’s trade with other regions has also remained limited. For instance, SAARC exported about $177 billion to East Asia, which amounts to only a sixth of ASEAN’s exports to the same region. It is expected that the various economic corridors being developed in the region – especially VCIC – will make trade easier by expanding land and maritime routes, and open a floodgate of economic activity. Ultimately, VCIC will be interconnected and evolve into a sub-regional corridor. The establishment of a regional corridor would lead to the reduction of barriers at national boundaries to enable the seamless movement of people and goods at least cost.

== Asian Development Bank (ADB) Support for VCIC ==
The ADB approved on 20 September 2016 (i) a $500 million multi-tranche financing facility (MFF), and (ii) a $125 million policy-based loan (PBL), both to India for the Visakhapatnam–Chennai Industrial Corridor Development Program (VCICDP). The MFF will support priority infrastructure investments in the VCIC, and the PBL will support policy reforms and institutional development in the state. Master planning for the identified industrial nodes is currently being undertaken.

The master plan for two prioritized nodes was prepared with ADB support and completed in June 2018. The master plan estimates an investment requirement of more than $2.8 billion over the next 5 years. ADB further provides support to the state government’s interactions with potential investors and in identifying anchor investors across key sectors in the two nodes.

== See also ==
- National Industrial Corridors of India
- South Asia Subregional Economic Cooperation
- South Asian Association for Regional Cooperation
