= Eastern Economic Corridor (India) =

The proposed Eastern Economic corridor of India would originate from Paradip port in Odisha province, pass through Jharkhand province, could possibly have an auxiliary loop through Chhattisgarh province, and would terminate at ICP Raxaul in Bihar province on the India-Nepal border. This corridor would also link up with North South Fast Track Corridor of Nepal. Beyond Nepal, it would be linked to China through Tibet. A portion of this corridor in Bihar lies along Asian Highway 42 and the Trans Asian Rail Network.

The route of this proposed Economic Corridor would follow a north–south alignment, with a number of major road and rail routes forming its spurs. Spurs would connect to a trunk route, following a fishbone configuration.

== Proposed benefits ==
- This project would touch upon the life of over 300 million people in states like Bihar, Eastern UP, Nepal, Jharkhand, Chhattisgarh, Odisha, and, to a lesser extent, the people in Eastern MP, the North Eastern Region, and even Tibet in the future.
- The project will effectively have over 75% of India's major mineral resources in its feeder zone, including almost 84% of India's Coal reserve and over 93% of India's iron ore reserve. The proposed corridor would help in efficient movement of these minerals.
- Most of the metal producing centers and many of the thermal power plants and cement plants would be effectively supported by the infrastructure created in the corridor.
- The corridor would link up two important international tourism circuits in India, the Buddhist circuit in Bihar and the Lake circuit in Odisha.
- It would help develop links to the Chinese economy, which is de facto emerging as the new regional economic superpower. Such linkage between India & China, with their likely emergence as the two largest economies on Earth, would have a beneficial impact on the economy of the entire region.
- The corridor would be a potential trade route between China and India through Nepal.

== See also ==
- Economic corridor
