= Economic corridor =

Integrated infrastructure networks

Economic corridors are integrated networks of infrastructure within a geographical area designed to stimulate economic development. They connect different economic agents in a particular geographic area. Corridors may be developed within a country or between countries. They have been part of strategies for economic development in Asia, Africa, and other areas.

Economic corridors often feature integrated infrastructure, such as highways, railroads and ports, and may link cities or countries. Corridors may be created to link manufacturing hubs, areas with high supply and demand, and manufacturers of value-added goods. When implemented, an economic corridor is often one part of a package of different measures including infrastructure development, visa and transport agreements, and standardization. Social needs, such as housing, are often considered in development plans.

== Definition ==
The Asian Development Bank coined the term economic corridor in 1998 to describe networks between different economic agents in a region.

In practice, the term has most often been used to connote road highways such as the East-West Economic Corridor or the Southern Economic Corridor of the Greater Mekong Subregion. Other corridors are anchored by other types of transportation, such as the China-Pakistan Economic Corridor, which has connectivity both by sea and land.

== Benefits ==
Regional integration

Economic corridors not only connect regions and countries through transportation but also strengthen infrastructure construction by establishing industrial clusters, thereby attracting investment and developing regional economy. As Hans-Peter Brunner points out, "they do not stand alone, as their role in regional economic development can be comprehended only in terms of the network effects that they induce". Recent work has emphasized the need for a clear link of linear infrastructure like roads to establish such integration of broader, spatial economic activities, as exemplified by the Almaty–Bishkek Economic Corridor (ABEC).

Economic development

A well-functioning industrial cluster will greatly stimulate economic development. As part of a comprehensive strategic development plan and integrated economic network, the economic corridor will integrate economic development in several regions within a country and/or between neighboring countries. Corridors can reduce production costs due to lower transportation and communication expenses, smooth connections between industrial chains, and shortened delivery times. At the same time, they can promote the development of other local industries, such as tourism and hotels.

Employment

As a development and infrastructure strategy, the economic corridor may drive the development of regional industries and create thousands of local jobs. Tourism, hotels, catering, and other service industries may gain development opportunities. In addition, the transnational economic corridor can also stimulate the development of foreign trade by providing convenient transportation conditions.

Living standards

The development of employment, commerce, and trade can increase the incomes of local people and facilitate the development some basic living facilities. Especially in some remote areas, the construction of transportation infrastructure can give residents access to education and medical services nearby, improving living conditions.

== Critiques ==
Crowding out effect

The construction of economic corridors requires large public or capital investment, which comes with several attached risks. Critics may describe a white elephant investment, an unfair investment of public money and space that sacrifices small business and individual interests in favor of corporate ones. The large investment in a single area can risk reduced investment in other areas, such as health, water and education.

Impacts of construction

The construction of some economic corridors has a negative impact on the local environment, causing various forms of pollution and sometimes damaging nature reserves, forest parks or wildlife reserves. Industrial construction may also damage cultural monuments along the route.

If an economic corridor crosses a residential area, construction may force local residents to relocate and lose cultivated or commercial land, employment, and interpersonal relationships. Some residents living and working in agriculture may be impacted by soil erosion and water pollution.

== Examples ==
=== Asia ===
- Bangladesh–China–India–Myanmar Forum for Regional Cooperation
  - East-West Industrial Corridor Highway, Arunachal Pradesh
- Central Asia Regional Economic Cooperation Program
- China–Pakistan Economic Corridor
- East–West Economic Corridor
- Eastern Economic Corridor
- Eastern Economic Corridor (India)
- Khyber Pass Economic Corridor
- Mumbai-Bangalore economic corridor
- Nanning–Singapore Economic Corridor
- Sarawak Corridor of Renewable Energy
- Trans-Himalayan Multi-dimensional Connectivity Network

=== Transcontinental ===
- China–Central Asia–West Asia Economic Corridor
- India-Middle East-Europe Economic Corridor

== See also ==
- Industrial corridor
- Infrastructure Development Finance Company
- Environmental issues
