= Haryana Land Record Information System =

Software used by the government of Haryana, India

HALRIS (Haryana Land Record Information System) is a Visual Basic/Microsoft SQL Server based software system used by the Haryana government for the computerisation of land records in its tehsils. It was developed by National Informatics Centre - Haryana State unit. The project was inaugurated on 1 November 2003 by Hon’ble Chief Minister Ch. Om Prakash Chautala in Sirsa District on the occasion of Haryana Day. HALRIS has been implemented in all Tehsils and subtehsils of Haryana.

Now the HALRIS System has been upgraded and called WebHalris. All the tehsils of Haryana State are now on WebHalris.

== Technical details ==
The software has been developed and maintained by National Informatics Centre - Haryana State Unit, Chandigarh. HALRIS project is running under the technical supervision of National Informatics Center and D.I.T.S (District Information Technology Society) which is a Govt. body headed by the Deputy Commissioner has also appointed Junior Programmers on contract basis to serve citizen with Deed Registration, Record of Right, Mutations, Khasra Girdawari (Crop Inspection) and other land records related activities.

== Features ==
- Real time availability of RoR through jamabandi portal.
- Integration with Municipal Corporations, HSVP, HSIIDC, Housing Board, EStamps.
- A touch screen module providing the Nakal (the copy of the Rights of Records) and query service to the public regarding their land record.
- Hindi user interface.
- Members of the public can get a copy of their respective record of right from the tehsil and also from the website:http://jamabandi.nic.in/.
- Dissemination of copies of jamabandies from the Land Records computer centres on demand, using computers for a nominal government fees.
- Ease in preparation of new jamabandies.
- Automatic generation of abstract for village, tehsil and district.

== Achievements ==
HALRIS received a Silver Icon National Award at the 8th national e-governance conference, and dynamically integrated HALRIS with HARIS (Haryana Registry Information System) received a Bronze Icon National Award at the 9th national e-governance conference.

== Failure to maintain ==
The government has failed to maintain this system and provide a solution for its citizens. As of 19/03/25, HALRIS or any similar system is not available in Haryana to help citizens access land records online. Meanwhile, a private company is now charging a hefty fee for providing land records, whereas similar information is available for free in other states like Punjab.

== See also ==
Surveys

- Great Trigonometrical Survey
- Survey of India

Survey terms

- Adverse possession
- Banjar, Jungle, Abadi, Shamlat, Gair Mumkin
- Barani, Nahri, Chahi, Taal
- Bigha
- Doab
- Khadir and Bangar
- Khasra
- Measurement of land in Punjab
- Patwari
- Shajra
- Zaildar
