= Measurement of land in Punjab =

The measurement of land in Punjab region of South Asia is an important aspect of agriculture and land management in the region. Punjab has a unique system of measuring land, typically done in units of bigha and acre. The measurements can vary slightly depending on the specific region and local customs.

The following are the basic measurements of land used in the Punjab region (including Haryana), divided between Indian and Pakistani Punjab, in ascending order. The measurement system is covered in detail in Punjab Weight and Measurement Act 1976.

In 2016, the Government of Punjab, Pakistan started using drones for the measurement of land.

== Standard measurement units for farmland ==
A commonly used land measurement unit in Punjab is karam or square karam. Other units include the sarsahi and units listed. This is the current system of measurement of farmland.

All Units

- 1 Karam = 5.5 feet = 1.8333 yard (Gaj)
- 1 Sq Karam = 1 Sarsahi = 30.25 Sq feet = 3.361111 Sq yard
- 1 Marla = 9 Sarsahi = 272.25 Sq feet = 30.25 Sq yard
- 1 Biswa = 4 Marla = 36 Sarsahi = 1,089 Sq feet = 121 Sq yard
- 1 Kanal = 5 Biswa = 20 Marla = 180 Sarsahi = 605 Sq yard
- 1 Bigha = 4 Kanal = 20 Biswa = 80 Marla = 2,420 Sq yard
- 1 Killa = 1 Acre = 2 Bigha = 8 Kanal = 40 Biswa = 160 Marla
- 1 Killa = 4,046.856 Sq metre = 4,840 Sq yard
- 1 Hectare = 2.471 Acre = 10,000 Sq metre = 11,959.9 Sq yard
- 1 Murabba = 25 Killa = 25 Acre = 10 Hectare

=== Muraba-Killa-Bigha system ===
- one 'karam' is 5.5 ft
- one 'Sq. Karam' is 'One Sarsai' = (5.5 x 5.5) = 30.25 Sq. Feet
- one 'marla' is 9 (Sarsai) square karams = 9 x (5.5x5.5) = 272.25 Sq ft =30.25 Sq yard.
- one 'kanaal' is 20 marlas (5,445 sq ft) = 605 Sq.yard (Gajz)
- one 'bigha' is 20 biswa (21,780 sq ft)
- one 'bigha' = 20 nisa
- one 'bigha' = 4 kanals
- 5 'kanaals' (27225 sq. ft) = 5x605 = 100 marla = 3025 sq.yd. (gajz)
- one 'killa' is of 8 kanaals = 8x605 = 4840sq.yd. (gajz)
- one 'murabba' is 25 killas (1,089,000 sq ft = 25 acres)
- 1 hectare is 2.47 Acres

=== Killa or acre measurements ===
A killa or Acre is measured rectangularly, reckoned as an area 36 karams (198 ft) x 40 karams (220 ft) or 43,560 square feet. Around 1/2 killa or acre is known as Bigha.

- 1 Karam = 5.5 feet = 1.8333 or Gaj (yard)
- 1 Yard = 36 Inch = 0.91 metre = 3 feet
- 1 Sq Yard = 9 Sq feet
- 1 Marla = 30.25 Sq yard = 272.25 sq feet
- 1 Kanal = 605 Sq yard = 5,445 Sq feet
- 1 Acre = 4,840 Sq yard = 43,560 Sq feet

== Standard measurement units for residential properties ==
Kothis (residential homes) and havelis (traditional mansions) are measured in marlas and kanals. Most are two to four kanaals but the big ones can be anything from four to six kanaals.

== Units of measurements in Sindh ==
Following are the current units of measurement in Sindh residential as well as open / agricultural land.

- 1 Athaas = 4 Acre
- 1 Hectare = 2.471 Acre
- 1 Acre = 2 Jarebs
- 1 Acre = 43,560 Sq feet = 4,840 Sq yard
- 1 Jareb = 20 Wiswa = 21,780 Sq feet = 2,420 Sq yard
- 1 Wiswa = 1,089 Sq feet = 121 Sq yard (33 feet x 33 feet)

== Units of measurements in Haryana ==
Following are the current units of measurement as per HALRIS. Different areas have different size of Bigha, hence this system is no longer used since 1957 when it was replaced by the standardised Acre-Kanal-Marla based meter system.

Acre-Kanal-Marla system (currently used, standardised metre system)

- 1 Karam = 66 inch (5.5 feet = 1.8333 yard)
- 1 Sarsari = 1 Sq Karam (3.361111 Sq yard)
- 9 Sarsari = 1 Marla (30.25 Sq yard)
- 20 Marla = 1 Kanal (605 Sq yard)
- 8 Kanal = 1 Acre (4,840 Sq yard)
- 1 Acre = 36 Karam (198 feet) × 40 Karam (220 feet)

Bigha-Biswa system (conversion to current Acre system)

- 1 Karam = 57.157 inch
- 1 Biswansi = 1 Karam X 1 Karam
- 20 Biswansi = 1 Biswa
- 20 Biswa = 1 Bigha
- 4 Bigha और 16 Biswa = 1 Acre

Killa-Biswa-Bigha system (old system, no longer used since 1957)

- 1 Karam = 57.157 inch
- 20 Biswansi = 1 Biswa
- 20 Biswa = 1 Bigha
- 4 Bigha = 1 Killa (40 Karam X 40 Karam)

=== Historic units of measurements ===
This measure was used in the revenue settlement of the districts of Delhi, Hisar, Rohtak, Ambala, Karnal, Fazilka, Ferozepur and Ludhiana during British Raj. This is now not used.

- 1 Bigha = 0.20 acres or 4.8 Bighas = 1 acre

== Historic measurements in Punjab ==
These are now outdated and have been standardised as above after the consolidation of land in Haryana and Punjab post-independence.

- one biswa = 15 Sq karams; 12 biswas = 1 kanaal (605 gaz)
- one bigha = 4 kanaal = 2,420 sq yard = 2,043.428 sq metre

=== Consolidated areas ===
In all areas settled and consolidated on the basis of the standard measure of 66 inches (5.5 feet or 1.8333 yard) i.e. Karam or Gatha:

- 1 Sq Karam (1.8333×1.8333) or 1 Sarsahi = 3.361111 Sq yard
- 9 Sarsahi or 1 Marla = 30.249999 Sq yard (say 30.25 Sq yard).
- 20 Marlas or 1 Kanal = 604.99996 Sq yard (say 605 Sq yard).
- 160 Marlas or 8 Kanal = 4839.99998 Sq yard (say 4,840 Sq yard or 1 acre or 1 killa)

=== Non-consolidated areas ===
These areas have been all consolidated as per the standard system now. These are older measurements from during the British Raj prior to these areas were consolidated. In the areas consolidated on the basis of the local measUte and the non-consolidated areas of Amritsar, Gurdaspur, (except Shahpur Hill Circle and Chak Andar in Pathankot tehsil), Ferozepur (except Fazilka) and the erstwhile princely State of Faridkot. Also applicable for Lahore (Pakistan):

- 1 Karam 60 inches
- 1 Sq. Karam or Sarsahi 2.777777 Sq. yds.
- 9 Sarsahies or 1 Marla 24.999999 Sq. yards say 25 Sq.yards.
- 20 Marlas or 1 Kanal 499.9999 Sq. yards say 500 Sq.yards
- 193.60 Marlas (9 Kanals1 Acre or 4840 Sq.yds 13 Marlas 5 Sarsahis)

=== Consolidated areas based on non-standard measures ===
In the areas consolidated on the basis of the local measure and the non-consolidated areas of Hoshiarpur, Jalandhar, Anandpur Sahib (Ropar) and the Shahpur hill Circle in Gurdaspur District during the British Raj.

- 1 Karam 57.5 inches
- 1 Sq. Karam or Sarsahi 2.5511188 Sq.yds.
- 9 Sarsahies or 1 Marla 22.960069 Sq.yards say 22.96 Sq.yds
- 20 Marlas or 1 Kanal 459.20138 Sq.yards say 459 Sq.yards.
- 210.8 Marlas 10.54 Kanals 1 Acre or 4840 Sq.yds

=== Consolidated areas based on non-standard measures in erstwhile princely State of Kapurthala ===
In the area consolidated on the basis of the local measure and the non-consolidated areas of the erstwhile princely State of Kapurthala:

- 1 Karam 54 inches
- 1 Sq. Karam or Sarsahi = 2.25 Sq.yds.
- 9 Sarsahies or 1 Marla = 20.25 Sq.yards
- 20 Marlas or 1 Kanal = 405 Sq.yards.
- 239 Marlas(11 Kanals 19 Marlas) = 1 Acre or 4840 Sq.yds.

1 Karam or Gat ha x 1 Karam or Gatha 1 Sq. Karam or Biswansi 20 Biswansis 1 Biswa 20 Biswa 1 Satty 2

| Sq feet | Sq yard | Sq metre | Karam | Marla | Kanal | Killa | Bigha | Muraba |
|---|---|---|---|---|---|---|---|---|
| 272.25 | 30.25 | 25.293 | 9 | 1 | 0.05 | 0.00625 | 0.0005 | 0.00025 |
| 5445 | 605 | 505.86 | 180 | 20 | 1 | 0.125 | 0.01 | 0.005 |
| 43560 | 4840 | 4046.88 | 1440 | 160 | 8 | 1 | 0.08 | 0.04 |
| 544500 | 60500 | 50586 | 18000 | 2000 | 100 | 12.5 | 1 | 0.5 |
| 1089000 | 121000 | 101172 | 36000 | 4000 | 200 | 25 | 2 | 1 |

== Terms used in Mutation (Jamabandi/ Farad) ==
For Agricultural Land

- Gair Mumkin: Not useful for cultivation e.g. mountainous etc.
- Chahi: Irrigated by tubewells
- Khudkasht: Cultivated by self, not given to someone else.

== See also ==
- Banjar, Jungle, Abadi, Shamlat, Gair Mumkin
- Barani, Nahri, Chahi, Taal
- Bigha
- Doab
- Haryana Land Record Information System
- Khadir and Bangar
- Khasra
- Patwari
- Shajra
- Zaildar
