= Khadir and Bangar =

Distinction of types of river plain in the Indo-Gangetic region

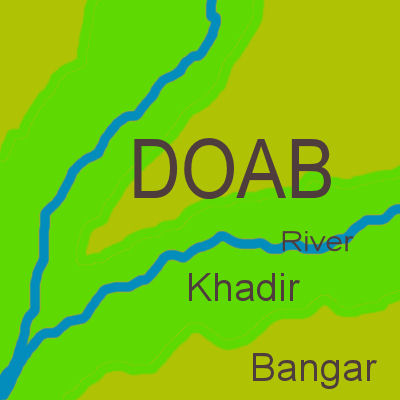
In any doab, khadar land (green) lies next to a river, while bangur land (olive) has greater elevation and lies further from the river

Khādir or Khadar and Bangar, Bāngur or Bhangar (Hindi: खादर और बांगर, Urdu: کهادر اور بانگر) are terms used in Hindi, Urdu, Punjabi and Sindhi in the Indo-Gangetic plains of North India and Pakistan to differentiate between two types of river plains and alluvial soils. Bangur and Khadir areas are commonly found in the doab regions. Some villages may have both Khadar and Bangar areas within their revenue boundaries. Bhangar soils are less fertile as they are above flood level whereas Khadar soils are more fertile as they are below the flood level. Bhanger is full of kankers (lime nodules) while khadar soil is composed of fine silt and clay. It is fertile land as it contains alluvial soil deposited by rivers.

== Khadir or Nali areas ==
Khadir or Khadar (Hindi: खादर or खादिर), also called Nali or Naili, are low-lying areas that are floodplains of a river and which are usually relatively narrower compared to unflooded bangar area. Khadar areas are prone to flooding and sometimes include portions of former river-beds that became available for agriculture when a river changes course. It is moisture retentive and sticky when wet. Khadir soil consists of new alluvial soil relatively higher in new silt content from the river, gets replenished with each flooding cycle, and is often very fertile.

The Khadir is also called Nali in northern Haryana, where it refers to the fertile prairie tract between the Ghaggar river and the southern limits of the Saraswati channel depression that gets flooded during the rainy season.

Sri Sri Ravi's Art of Living Foundation World Culture Festival, 2016 (11 March) was held on Yamuna's Khadir floodplains and National Green Tribunal (NGT) recommended a fine of INR 50 million, on Art of Living Foundation for damaging ecology on Yamuna's Khadar flood plains.

== Bangar areas and subtypes ==
Bangar/Bangad/Bhangaar (Hindi: बांगर) areas are beyond the floodplains, that lie more upland, and compared to Khadar it consists of older alluvial soil which is higher in sandy loam content. Bangar areas are less prone to flooding but are usually more sandy and less fertile as well.

A Bangar area, can be further subdivided into the following based on the type of irrigation:

- Barani area are traditionally rain-fed areas. These are any low rain area where rain-fed dry farming is practiced. Bagar tract, the dry sandy tract of land in Rajasthan state & areas bordering the states of Haryana and Punjab, is an example of Barani land. Not all the Barani lands are part of the Bagar tract. Some of Barani areas nowadays are dependent on tubewells for irrigation wherever groundwater level is not too low, hence technically they can now be termed as Chahi even though their legal classification in land revenue records may still be Barani.
- Nahri is any canal-irrigated land, for example, the Rangoi tract is a Nahri area because it is irrigated by the Rangoi canal made for the purpose of carrying flood waters of Ghagghar river to the dry bangar areas. For the Nahri lands, Warabandi is a roaster of water to be drawn from a canal by each farmer for irrigating their land. Chak, based on British Raj era revenue collection system, is the land revenue settlement/assessment circle marking a contiguous block of land, which has also become synonymous with the name of the village founded by migrant farmers within the revenue circle.
- Chahi is any land that is irrigated through wells/tube wells. Chahi Khalis is the land irrigated only by the well. Chahi Nahri is the land partly irrigated by the well and partly by the canal. Chahi Sailab is the land within Kadhir areas which is partly irrigated by the well and partly by the floods. Chahi Taal or Taal is land irrigated by johad (pond).

== Related terms ==
Zamindar (landlord) is the Indian legal term for the owner of land. Both Bangar and Kadhir land can also be classified based on the type of land use:

- Banjar is any uncultivated land. Kalar is barren land.
  - Banjar Jadid is any new fallow land that has been left uncultivated for the last four harvests.
  - Banjar Kadim is the old fallow land that has been left uncultivated for the last eight harvests.
- Jangal is any uncultivated land covered with brushwood and small trees. Whereas Bir land means a nature reserve.
- Abadi is any inhabited area on any type of land [including the Gair Mumkin land where cultivation is not possible] and Abadi Deh is any inhabited area on the cultivatable land.

Abadi is an Urdu word which means a population, usually a large one, hence the name of the type of land.

- Gair Mumkin is any non-cultivable land, such as hills, parts of foothills, or mountains.
- Shamlat (शामलात) is land that belongs to the community, jointly owned by the villagers in proportion to their land ownership of the cultivatable land and it is usually left uncultivated for community usage, such as grazing or for building future facilities like schools, dispensaries, johad, etc. Shamlat Deh (शामलात देह) is the community land jointly belonging to all land owners of the village.
  - Shamlat Panna (शामलात पाना) is the community land belonging to all land owners of a panna in a village, whereas pana itself is a habitation subdivision of villages, which is also called Shamlat Patti (शामलात पत्ती) in some villages. It is also called as Taraf (towards/direction).
    - Shamlat Thola (शामलात ठोला) is the community land belonging to a thola in a village, which is a habitation subdivision of panna sub-villages usually made up of people belonging to the same lineage. Shamlat Thola is also called Shamlat Thok (शामलात ठोक) in some specific villages.

=== Other useful terms ===
Other useful terms in the measurement of land in Haryana and Punjab are Bigha, Khasra, Patwari (Village accountant), Shajra, Zaildar, etc.

== Doab ==
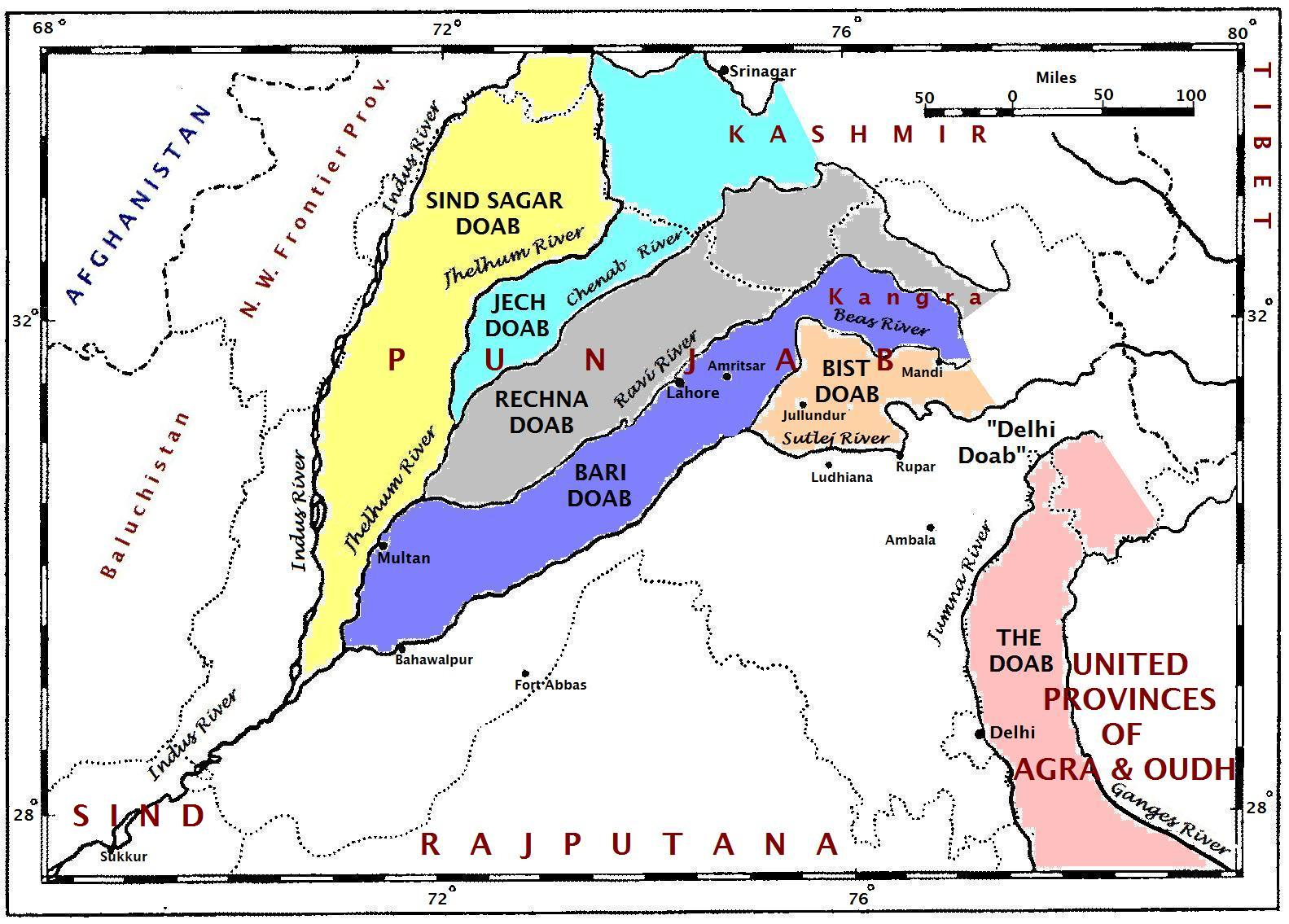
A map of the Punjab region ca. 1947 showing the different doabs.

Since North India and Pakistan is coursed by a multiplicity of Himalayan rivers that divide the plains into doabs (i.e. regions between two rivers), the Indo-Gangetic plains consist of alternating regions of river, khadir and bangar. The centers of the doabs consist of bangar and the peripheries, which line the rivers, consist of khadir. Historically, villages in the doabs have been officially classified as khadir, khadir-bangar (i.e. mixed) or bangar for many centuries and different agricultural tax rates applied based on a tiered land-productivity scale.

In some areas, these terms have become incorporated in several village names themselves, such as Murshidpur Bangar and Ranchi Bangar-Khadir in Mathura district of Uttar Pradesh. Other places include Chilla Saroda Bangar, Gharonda Neemka Bangar, Pehlad Pur Bangar, Rampur Bangar and Salarpur Khadar.

== See also ==
- Regions
  - Bagar region
  - Barani, Nehri, Nalli
  - Bhattiana
  - Deshwali
  - Jangladesh
  - Punjab region
  - Nardak
- Languages of related regions
  - Bagri dialect
  - Haryanvi language
  - Rajasthani language
- Related concepts
  - Dhani (settlement type)
  - Doab
  - Johad
  - Nardak
- Similar sounding
  - Khaddar cloth
