= Madoki =

Village in Punjab, Pakistan

Madoki is a village in Punjab province, Pakistan. It is 14 km south of Jhang Saddar and 9 km west of Taremu. It has a population of approximately 30,000. The most common spoken languages are Punjabi and Urdu, and the culture is predominantly Punjabi. Most people make a living from farming, particularly from sugar cane.

Madoki has an area of c. 4400 marla. It has a nearby railway station.
