= Abdul Samad Khan Tomb =

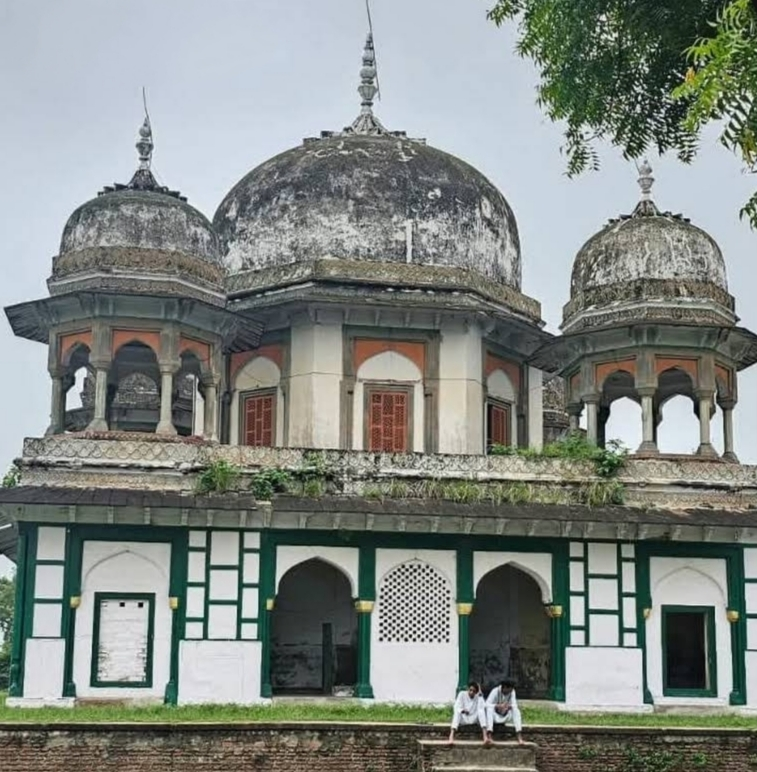
- Abdul Samad Khan Tomb, Abu Nagar, Fatehpur
- Interactive map of Abdul Samad Khan Tomb
- Location: Abu Nagar, Fatehpur, Uttar Pradesh 212601,India
- Coordinates: 25°56′32″N 80°48′35″E

The Tomb of Nawab Abdul Samad Khan, recorded under Khasra number 753 and locally known as Maqbara Mangi, is located in Abu Nagar, Fatehpur district, Uttar Pradesh, India. It serves as the mausoleum of Nawab Abdul Samad Khan Bahadur, who served as Faujdar of Pailani during the reign of Emperor Aurangzeb.

== History ==
The tomb is believed to have been constructed in the late Mughal period. Historical accounts suggest that Abdul Samad Khan was a prominent figure in the Mughal administration, and the monument was built to honour his memory of life.

== Significance ==
The monument holds historical importance as the resting place of Nawab Abdul Samad Khan Bahadur, a key figure in the Mughal administration. It is a notable landmark for the local community and attracts visitors interested in heritage architecture.

== Location and Access ==
The tomb is situated in Abu Nagar, in the Fatehpur district of Uttar Pradesh, India. It lies approximately 15 kilometres from the district headquarters of Fatehpur and is accessible via the Fatehpur–Bindki road. Public transportation, including local buses and auto-rickshaws, is available from nearby towns. The site is maintained by the local municipal authorities and is open to visitors throughout the year, with peak footfall during cultural and heritage festivals Eid is Very femous in this area.
