= Nepalese customary units of measurement =

In Nepal, some customary units of measurement are still used, although the metric system has been the official standard since 1968.

== Length ==
The kos (kosh, krosh, koss) is a very ancient measure of distance, measuring about 2.25 miles or 3.7 kilometres.

- 1 murii = approx. 0.75 inch
- 4 angul = 1 dharnugrah (bow grip) = 3 in
- 8 angul = 1 dhanurmushti (fist with thumb raised) = 6 in
- 12 angul = 1 vitastaa (span) = 9 in
- 2 vitastaa (cubit) = 18 in
- 1 haath = 1.5 ft.
- 1 dand or dhanush (bow) = 4 haath = 6 ft
- 2000 dand = 1 kos or Gorut = 4000 yards or 2.25 miles
- 4 kosh = 1 yojan = 9 mi = 14.48 km

== Land area ==
In Nepal, two types of unit systems are used for land area measurements. In hilly regions, ropani-aana-paisa-daam units are used, while in terai regions, bigha-kattha-dhur units measurements are used.

The precise land measurement conversions as per Nepal standard are as follows:

| Units | khetmuri | bigha | kattha | dhur | ropani | aana | paisa | daam | sq.feet | sq.meter |
|---|---|---|---|---|---|---|---|---|---|---|
| khetmuri | 1 | 1.877914952 | 37.55829904 | 751.1659808 | 25 | 400 | 1600 | 6400 | 136900 | 12718.42618 |
| bigha | 0.532505478 | 1 | 20 | 400 | 13.31263696 | 213.0021914 | 852.0087655 | 3408.035062 | 72900 | 6772.631616 |
| kattha | 0.026625274 | 0.05 | 1 | 20 | 0.665631848 | 10.65010957 | 42.60043828 | 170.4017531 | 3645 | 338.6315808 |
| dhur | 0.001331264 | 0.0025 | 0.05 | 1 | 0.033281592 | 0.532505478 | 2.130021914 | 8.520087655 | 182.25 | 16.93157904 |
| ropani | 0.04 | 0.075116598 | 1.502331962 | 30.04663923 | 1 | 16 | 64 | 256 | 5476 | 508.737047 |
| aana | 0.0025 | 0.004694787 | 0.093895748 | 1.877914952 | 0.0625 | 1 | 4 | 16 | 342.25 | 31.79606544 |
| paisa | 0.000625 | 0.001173697 | 0.023473937 | 0.469478738 | 0.015625 | 0.25 | 1 | 4 | 85.5625 | 7.94901636 |
| daam | 0.00015625 | 0.000293424 | 0.005868484 | 0.117369684 | 0.00390625 | 0.0625 | 0.25 | 1 | 21.390625 | 1.98725409 |
| sq. feet | 7.3046E-06 | 1.37174E-05 | 0.000274348 | 0.005486968 | 0.000182615 | 0.002921841 | 0.011687363 | 0.046749452 | 1 | 0.09290304 |
| sq. meter | 7.86261E-05 | 0.000147653 | 0.002953062 | 0.059061237 | 0.001965652 | 0.031450432 | 0.125801729 | 0.503206915 | 10.76391042 | 1 |

In a nutshell, the following is a partial list of everyday units used to calculate land area in Nepal.

- 1 Khetmuri = 25 Ropani
- 1 Bigha (बिघा) = 20 Kattha (कठ्ठा) = 6772.63 m^{2} = 72900 sq.ft. = 13.31 Ropani
- 1 Kattha (कठ्ठा) = 20 Dhur (धुर) = 338.63 m^{2} = 3645 sq.ft.
- 1 Dhur (धुर) = 16 Kanwa (कनवा) = 16.93 m^{2} = 182.25 sq.ft.
- 1 Ropani (रोपनी) = 16 Aana (आना) = 64 Paisa (पैसा) = 508.72 m^{2} = 5476 sq.ft. = 256 Daam (दाम) = 4 llka
- 1 Aana (आना)= 4 Paisa (पैसा) = 31.80 m^{2} = 342.25 sq. ft. = 16 Daam (दाम)
- 1 Paisa (पैसा) = 4 Daam (दाम) = 7.95 m^{2} = 85.56 sq. ft.
- 1 Daam (दाम) = 1.99 m^{2} = 21.39 sq. ft.

The units of measurement of area of land depends on the part of the country where they are being used, with the Bigha-Katha-Dhur measurements common in the Terai region while the Ropani-Aana measurements are common in hilly and mountainous regions.

Terai region

In the Terai region, the southern parts of Nepal, the customary units are those used elsewhere in South Asia:

- 1 kattha = 20 dhur
- 1 bigha = 20 katha

Hilly and mountainous regions

A different system is used in hilly regions:

- 1 paisa = 4 dam (daam)
- 1 ana (aana) = 4 paisa
- 1 ropani = 16 ana

Conversions

- 1 ropani = 74 feet × 74 feet
- 1 bigha = 13 Ropani 5 Anna
- 1 kattha = 442 square yards or 338 square meters

== Volume ==
- 10 Mutthi (fistful) = 1 Mana
- 8 Mana = 1 Pathi (4.54596L)
- 20 Pathi = 1 Muri

== See also ==
- List of customary units of measurement in South Asia
