= Kanal (unit) =

Traditional unit of land area

A kanal is a unit of area used in northern parts of South Asia. It is primarily used in northern India.

Under British rule, the marla and kanal were standardized so that one kanal equals 20 marlas or 605 square yards or 1/8 acre.

== Conversion ==
- 1 hectare = 19.768 kanal
- 1 acre = 8 kanal
- 1 bigha = 4 kanal (Punjab)
- 1 bigha = 5 kanal (East UP/ Bihar)
- 1 kanal = 4 Katha (East India)
- 1 kanal = 5 Biswa (Punjab)
- 1 kanal = 20 marla
- 1 kanal = 505.857 sq metre
- 1 kanal = 605 sq yard
- 1 kanal = 5,445 sq feet

== See also ==
- Marla (unit)
