= Haveli Bagh-e-Sardaran Complex =

Temple complex in Rawalpindi

Bagh Sardaran Temple Complex
- باغ سردارن مندر کمپلیکس
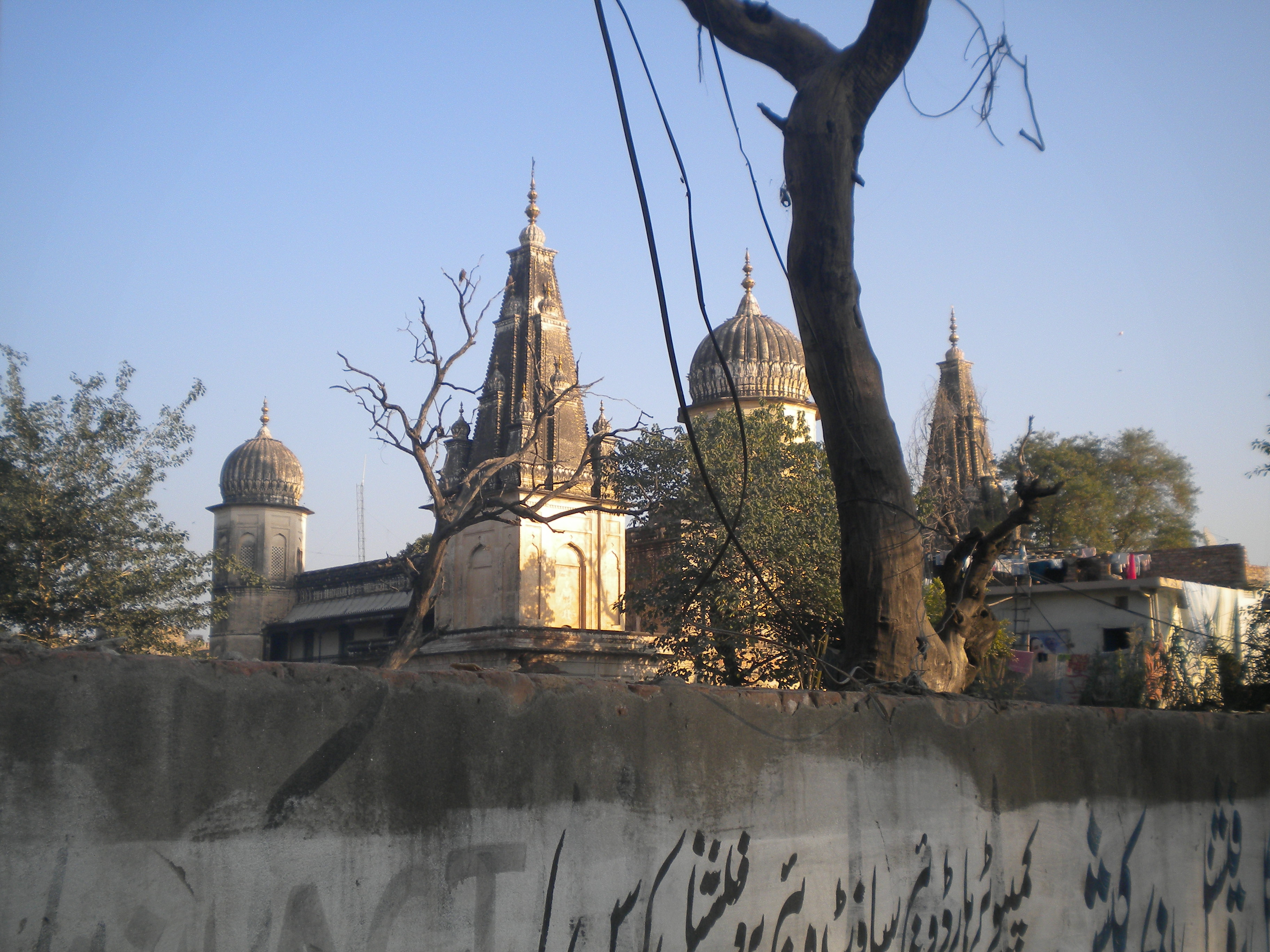
- Spires and domes of the temples and gurdwaras as viewed from outside the complex

Religion
- Affiliation: Hinduism
- District: Rawalpindi District
- Province: Punjab

Location
- Location: Bagh Sardaran
- Country: Pakistan
- Interactive map of Bagh Sardaran Temple Complex
- Coordinates: 33°37′10″N 73°03′19″E

Architecture
- Type: Mughal
- Creator: Sardar Band Singh; Sardar Milkha Singh Thehpuria
- Completed: 1895; 131 years ago

Haveli Bagh-e-Sardaran Complex, also known as the Raghunath Temple Complex, is a temple complex located in the Bagh Sardaran area of Rawalpindi in the Punjab province of Pakistan. It is considered to be the second-oldest temple in the city, having been built in 1895.

The complex has three non-functional Hindu temples and two Sikh gurdwaras. It not only served as a religious site, but also as a welfare center for the local communities. Most of the complex now acts as an office and residence for the Special Branch of the Police.

The complex is frequented annually by Sikh visitors on the occasion of Vaisakhi.

== History ==
The foundation is said to have been laid by Sardar Band Singh, who was a descendant of Guru Nanak, the founder of Sikhism, laid the foundation of Bagh-e-Sardaran. He, along with Sardar Milkha Singh Thehpuria, helped with the construction arrangements. The complex is also said to have built to foster inter-faith harmony among the surrounding Hindu, Sikh, and Muslim communities. The locals claim that the complex also housed a swimming pool and a garden, and covered an area of 6 acres (24,000 m^{2}).

After the Partition of India, most of the Hindus and Sikhs of the area migrated to India. The complex was then converted into a recreational spot by the remaining Muslims. Allotments and encroachments resulted in the reduction of the remaining complex area to only a few marlas.
