= Bigha =

Unit of area measurement in South Asia

The bigha or beegah (Urdu: بیگھا, Hindi: बीघा, Bengali: বিঘা) is a traditional unit of measurement of area of a land, commonly used in northern and eastern India, Bangladesh and Nepal. There is no "standard" size of bigha and it varies considerably from place to place.

On an average, Bigha ranges from 6,806.25 square feet (632.321 m^{2}) to 27,225 square feet (2,529.3 m^{2}). Its sub-unit is Biswa or Katha in many regions, but it has no "standard" size. A bigha may have 5 to 20 Katha/ biswa in different regions, where 1 Katha is usually 1,361.25 square feet (126.464 m^{2}) or 151.25 square yard.

== Sub-unit ==
A bigha may have 5 to 20 Katha or Biswa in different regions, where 1 Katha usually range between 1,089 square feet (101.2 m^{2}) and 1,361.25 square feet (126.464 m^{2}). In Assam and West Bengal Katha is 2,880 square feet (268 m^{2}).

Commonly used size of Bigha in Uttar Pradesh, Bihar and Jharkhand are as follows: (here 1 Katha/ Biswa is 1,361.25 sq feet)

Type of Bigha	Sq feet	Sq yard	Sq metre
5 Biswa	6,806.25	756.25	632.32
6.6667 Biswa	9,075	1,008.33	843.09
20 Biswa	27,225	3,025.00	2,529.28

Commonly used size of Bigha in Haryana, Punjab, Rajasthan, Uttarakhand and Himachal Pradesh are as follows: (here, 1 Biswa is 1,089 sq feet)

Type of Bigha	Sq feet	Sq yard	Sq metre
8 Biswa	8,712	968.00	809.37
16 Biswa	17,424	1,936.00	1,618.74
20 Biswa	21,780	2,420.00	2,023.43

== Uses in India ==
The Bigha is a traditional unit of land in several parts of North & East India. Sale and purchase of land (particularly agricultural land) is still done unofficially in this unit. However, the area is recorded mostly in hectare or Acre and sometimes in square metre or square yard in official land records. Bigha varies in size from one part of India to another. Various states and often regions within the same state have different sizes attributed to the bigha. It is usually less than one acre or 43,560 square feet (4,047 m^{2}) but can extend up to 3 acres in some areas.

In India, Bigha is commonly used in the states of Uttarakhand, Haryana, Himachal Pradesh, Punjab, Madhya Pradesh, Uttar Pradesh, Bihar, Jharkhand, West Bengal, Assam, Gujarat and Rajasthan. However, in Maharashtra and Tamil Nadu, Bigha is not in practical measurement unit.

=== Assam (অসম) ===
In Assam, a bigha (বিঘা) is 14,400 square feet (1,340 m^{2}) or 1,600 sq yard. One bigha is divided into 5 Katha. Each Katha (কঠা) consists of 20 Lessa (লেচা). Hence each Katha is 2,880 square feet (268 m^{2}) in area, although this may vary within different regions of Assam. 4 bighas together are further termed as a Pura (পূৰা).

- 1 Katha (কঠা) = 2,880 square feet (268 m^{2}) or 320 sq yard
- 1 Lessa (লেচা) = 144 square feet (13.4 m^{2}) or 16 sq yard
- 1 Acre (একৰ) = 3.025 bigha and 1 Hectare (হেক্টৰ) = 7.475 bigha (Assam)

=== Bihar ===
In Bihar, different regions have different sizes of Bigha. Near the capital, Patna, one bigha is equivalent to 20 Katha. 1 Katha is equals to 1,361.25 square feet (126.464 m^{2}) or 151.25 square yard.

One Katha is further subdivided in 20 dhur. Hence each Dhur is 68.05 square feet (6.322 m^{2}). One Dhur is subdivided in 20 dhurki, each Dhurki being 3.403 square feet (0.3161 m^{2}).

- One decimal is equal to 435.60 sq feet or 1/100 acre.
- One Acre = 43,560 square feet (4,047 m^{2}) or 4,840 sq. yard.
- 1 Bigha (बीघा) = 20 Katha (कठ्ठा) = 2,529 m^{2} or 3,025 sq. yard or 27,225 sq. feet
- 1 Katha (कठ्ठा) = 20 Dhur (धुर) = 126.46 m^{2} or 151.25 sq. yard or 1,361.25 sq. feet
- 1 Acre = 1.6 Bigha = 100 decimal; and 1 Hectare = 3.95 Bigha (Patna)

Note: Katha also varies from place to place. 1 Katha in Muzaffarpur is 1,901 square feet (176.6 m^{2}); and in West Champaran is 3,267 square feet (303.5 m^{2}).

=== Himachal Pradesh ===
In Himachal Pradesh, five bigha is equal to one Acre. Hence, 1 Bigha = 8,712 square feet (809.4 m^{2}) or 968 square yard. One Hectare is equal to 12.35 bigha.

=== Punjab ===
In Punjab and Haryana, 2 bigha is equal to one acre, each bigha is 4 kanals, each kanal is 20 marlas, each marla is 9 square karam. Each square Karam is 30.25 square feet (5.5 feet X 5.5 feet), each karam is 5.5 feet.

See measurement of land in Punjab as below:

- 1 Killa = 1 Acre (4,046.8 square metre or 4,840 square yard)
- 1 Killa = 8 Kanal = 2 Bigha = 160 Marla
- 1 Bigha = 4 Kanal = 0.5 Killa = 80 Marla
- 1 Bigha = 2,023.4 square metre or 2,420 square yard
- 1 Kanal = 20 Marla = 0.25 Bigha (605 square yard)
- 1 Marla = 25.2928 square metre or 30.25 square yard

=== Madhya Pradesh ===
In Madhya Pradesh, one Bigha has 20 Katha, where 1 Katha = 600 square feet (56 m^{2}). Therefore 1 bigha = 12,000 square feet (1,100 m^{2}).

=== Rajasthan ===
In Rajasthan, One Pucca Bigha = 27,225 square feet (2,529.3 m^{2}) or 3,025 square yard. A plot of land with each side 165 feet is called as Bigha (165 ft × 165 ft).

- One Kaccha Bigha = 17,424 square feet (1,618.7 m^{2}) or 1,936 square yard.

=== Uttar Pradesh ===
In Uttar Pradesh, one bigha can mean different things to people in different districts of the state. One Bigha in UP ranges from 5 biswa to 20 biswa. Here one Biswa is 1,361.25 square feet (126.464 m^{2}) or 151.25 square yard.

- In Western UP, 1 bigha is usually equal to 5 biswa i.e. 6,806.25 square feet (632.321 m^{2}) or 756.25 square yard. In some districts it can be 6.6667 biswa i.e. 9,075 square feet (843.1 m^{2}) or 1,008.33 square yard.
- In Eastern UP and Lucknow, 1 bigha is equal to 20 biswa. Hence 1 Bigha in Purvanchal is 27,225 square feet (2,529.3 m^{2}) or 3,025 square yard.

=== Uttarakhand ===
In Uttarakhand, one bigha is different in plain and hilly areas.

- In Hilly area, 1 Bigha is 6,806.25 square feet or 632.32 square metres (756.25 sq yd).
- In Plain area, 1 Bigha is 17,424 square feet or 1,618.74 square metres (1,936.00 sq yd)

Nali is also commonly used in Hilly area. 1 Nali is 2,160 square feet or 200.67 square metres (240.00 sq yd). 1 Bigha can vary from 3.151 to 8.06 Nali.

=== West Bengal ===
In West Bengal, the Bigha was standardized under British colonial rule at 14,400 square feet (1,340 m^{2}) or 1,600 square yard. This is often interpreted as being 1/3 Acre (it is precisely 40/121 Acre). Therefore, 1 Acre = 3.025 bigha and 1 Hectare = 7.475 bigha in West Bengal.

== Uses in Bangladesh ==
Bigha is a traditional unit of land in entire Bangladesh, with land purchases still being undertaken in this unit. One bigha is equal to 20 Katha (14,400 square feet or 1,600 square yard) as standardized in pre-partition Bengal during the British rule. In other words, 3 bigha are just 0.5 Katha or 360 sq ft short of 1 acre. (One Acre = 4,840 sq yd or 43,560 sq ft or 4,047 sq m).

=== Measurements of area ===
- 1 Katha (কাঠা) = 720 sq ft (80 sq yd or 66.89 sq m)
- 1 Bigha = 14,400 sq ft (1,337.8 sq m or 1,600 sq yd)
- 1 Acre (একর) = 3.025 bigha (বিঘা) = 60.5 Katha (কাঠা)
- 1 Hectare = 7.475 bigha = 149.5 Katha

== Use in Nepal ==
A Bigha is a customary unit of measurement in Nepal, equal to about 6,773 square meters. Officially, most measurement of lands use units of either Bigha (in Terai region) or Ropani (Nepali: रोपनी) (in Hilly regions). Metric system (SI unit of square metre) is very seldom used officially in measuring area of land.

Measurement of area in terms of bigha

1 Bigha (बिघा)= 20 Katha (कठ्ठा) (about 6,772.63 m^{2} or 72900 sq.ft.)
1 Katha (कठ्ठा) = 20 Dhur (धुर) (about 338.63 m^{2} or 3,645 sq.ft.)
1 Dhur (धुर) = 16.93 m^{2} or 182.25 sq.ft.
1 Kanwa (कनवा) = 1/16 Dhur (धुर)
1 Kanaee (कनई) = 1/16 Kanwa (कनवा)

[Note: Kanwa is largely obsolete and is used only when tiny lands are very precious].

1 Bigha = 13.31 Ropani (रोपनी)
1 Ropani = 16 aana (आना) (about 508.72 m^{2} or 5476 sq. ft.)
1 aana = 4 paisa (पैसा) (about 31.80 m^{2} or 342.25 sq.ft.)
1 paisa = 4 daam (दाम) (7.95 m^{2})
1 Bigha = 6,772.63 m^{2}
1 Bigha = 0.677263 hectare = 1.6735 acre
1 Hectare = 19.6565 Ropani

== In popular culture ==
The classic Hindi movie Do Bigha Zamin ("Two bighas of land", 1953) by Bimal Roy portrayed the struggle of a poor peasant with very little landholding.

== See also ==
- Doab
- Jagir
- Khadir and Bangar
- Barani, Nahri, Chahi, Taal
- Banjar, Jungle, Abadi, Shamlat, Gair Mumkin
- Measurement of land in Punjab
- Patwari
- Zaildar
- Zamindar

== Sources ==
- Area conversion, royalreality.com (archived 27 April 2006)
- Land glossary, Bhulekh – etawah.nic.in (archived 29 June 2011)
- Land measurement in India, landzone.in
- Bhulekh, uk.gov.in
