= Katha (unit) =

Unit of area measurement in South Asia

Katha or Biswa (also spelled kattha or cottah; Hindi: कट्ठा, Assamese: কঠা, Bengali: কাঠা) is a unit of area mostly used for land measurement in India, Nepal, and Bangladesh. After metrication in the mid-20th century by these countries, the unit became officially obsolete. But this unit is still in use in much of Bangladesh, Northern India, Eastern India and Nepal. The measurement of katha varies significantly from place to place.

== Bangladesh ==
In Bangladesh, one katha is standardized to 720 square feet (67 m^{2}), and 20 katha equals 1 bigha.

- 1 Katha (কাঠা) = 720 sq. feet = 66.88 sq. metre = 1.652 Decimal (শতাংশ/ শতক)
- 1 Bigha (বিঘা) = 20 Katha (কাঠা) = 14,400 square feet = 1,338 sq m = 1,600 sq yard
- 1 Acre (একর) = 3.025 Bigha (বিঘা) = 60.5 Katha (কাঠা) = 4,047 square metre
- 1 Hectare (হেক্টর) = 2.47 Acre (একর) = 7.475 Bigha (বিঘা) = 149.5 Katha (কাঠা)
- 1 Katha (কাঠা) = 16 Chattak (ছটাক)

== India ==
=== Assam ===
In Assam, 1 Katha is equal to 2,880 ft^{2} and 1 Bigha = 5 Katha; 1 bigha = 14,400 ft^{2} and in lower assam such as cachar it is 720 square feet.

=== Bihar ===
In Bihar, one Katha may vary from 720 to 3,267 square feet (ft^{2}). 1 Bigha = 20 Katha. One katha is divided in 20 dhur. One dhur is subdivided in 20 dhurki. The origin of the term and measurement unit was during the Pala Empire. 1 Decimal = 435.6 square feet & 1 Acre = 100 decimal.

- In Patna & Arrah, 1 Katha is equal to 1,361.25 ft^{2} or 3.125 decimal.
  - 1 Hectare = 3.95 bigha = 79 Katha
  - 1 Acre = 1.6 bigha = 32 Katha
  - 1 Bigha = 27,225 ft^{2} = 20 Katha
  - 1 Katha = 1,361.25 ft^{2} = 20 dhur (Patna)
  - 1 Dhur = 68.0625 ft^{2} = 20 Dhurki
- In Bettiah, 1 Katha = 7.5 decimal = 3,267 ft^{2} and 1 bigha = 65,340 ft^{2}
- In Chhapra, 1 Katha = 4 decimal = 1,742.4 ft^{2} and 1 bigha = 34,848.0 ft^{2}
- In Hajipur, 1 Katha = 1,901.25 ft^{2} and 1 Bigha = 38,025 ft^{2}.

=== Jharkhand ===
In Jharkhand, 1 Katha ranges from 720 to 2535 square feet. In Ranchi, 1 Katha is equal to 720 ft^{2}. 1 bigha is equal to 20 Katha; 1 bigha = 14,400 ft^{2}.

=== Punjab ===
In Punjab and Haryana, Katha is known as Biswa. 1 Bigha = 20 Biswa and 1 Biswa = 20 Biswansi.

- 1 Acre = 2 bigha = 4,840 square yard
- 1 Bigha = 2,420 square yard
- 1 biswa = 121 square yard
- 1 biswansi = 6.05 square yard

=== Uttar Pradesh ===
In Uttar Pradesh, Katha is also known as Biswa. One Katha is equal to 1,361.25 ft^{2} or 151.25 square yard or 126.46 square metre. One Bigha in UP can range from 5 to 20 Katha.

In Western UP, 1 Bigha can be 5.0 Katha (756.25 square yard) or 6.6667 Katha (1,008.33 square yard). In Eastern UP, 1 Bigha is 20 Katha (3,025 square yard).

- 1 Katha or 1 Biswa = 20 Dhur or 20 Biswansi
- 1 Dhur = 1 Biswansi
- 1 Dhur = 20 Dhurki
- 1 Katha = 3.125 Decimal
- 1 Acre = 100 Decimal
- 1 Acre = 32 Katha

In Purvanchal, 1 Katha = 1,361.25 square feet (126.464 m^{2}) or 151.25 square yard. One Bigha is made up of 5 to 20 Katha. Katha is divided into 20 Dhur and Dhur is subdivided into 20 Dhurki.

=== West Bengal ===
In West Bengal, 1 Katha is equal to 720 ft^{2}. 1 bigha is equal to 20 Katha; 1 bigha = 14,400 ft^{2}.

1 Acre = 3.025 Bigha, 1 katha= 16 chatak, 1 chatak=45 sq.ft

== Nepal ==
In Nepal, 1 Katha is equivalent to 338.55 m^{2} With Manoj Chhetri

== See also ==
- List of customary units of measurement in South Asia
- Nepalese customary units of measurement
