= Shajra =

Land and genealogical record-type of the Indian subcontinent

A shajarah or shajra is a detailed village map that is used for legal (land ownership) and administrative purposes in Pakistan and Northwest India. A shujra maps out the village lands into land parcels and gives each parcel a unique number. The patwari (or village accountant) maintains a record for each one of these parcels in documents called khasras.

Aks-Shajrah is the copy of the map.

== Genealogy ==
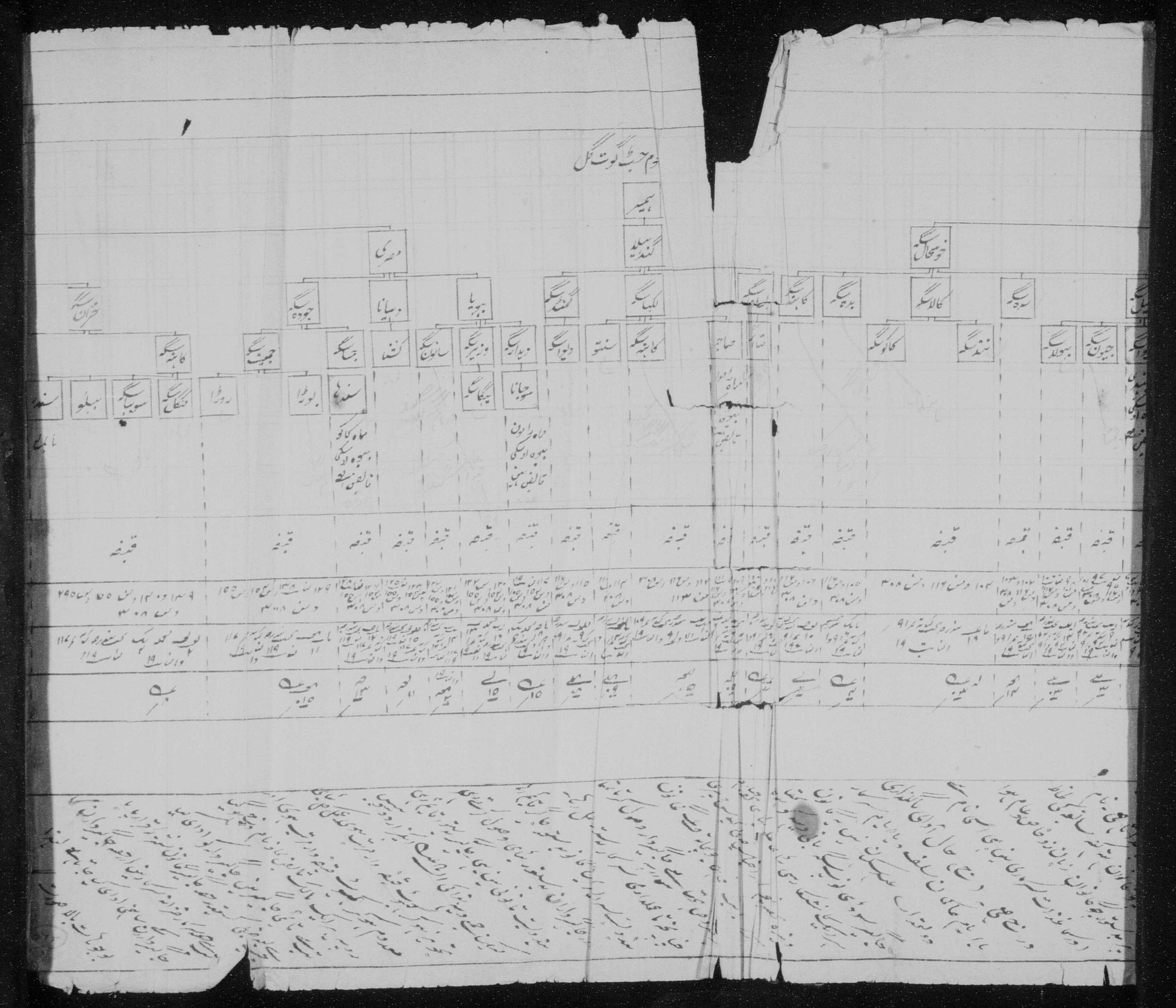
Example of a genealogical pedigree (family-tree) of a landowning family of Chugawan village in Moga district (formerly part of Ferozepore district), Punjab, 1887–1888

Shajra also rendered as Shajra Nasab, shajarat, (Arabic/Urdu: شجرہ, Hindi: वंशावली), (synonyms: Ancestry, Pedigree, Genealogy, Lineage, Family Tree, Shajra, Family Chart) which means Tree of Ancestry. The term "Shajra" comes from the Arabic word شَجَر (Shajar), meaning "a tree" or "a plant." A conventional tree structure is similar to a genealogy/pedigree chart representing family relationships.

The term Shajjra Nasb (also known as Kursee Nama (Note: Also spelt as 'Shajra Nasab'. Kursee Nama is also spelt as 'Kurseenama' or 'Kursinama'.)) refers to records detailing land ownership pedigrees for families of the village. Records of villages of Moga and Firozpur districts of Punjab India from 1887–1958 have been digitized by the Church of Jesus Christ of Latter-day Saints via FamilySearch and are available for online viewing. The genealogical importance of such records for the purpose of family history research was raised by Gurcharan Singh Gill of Moga.

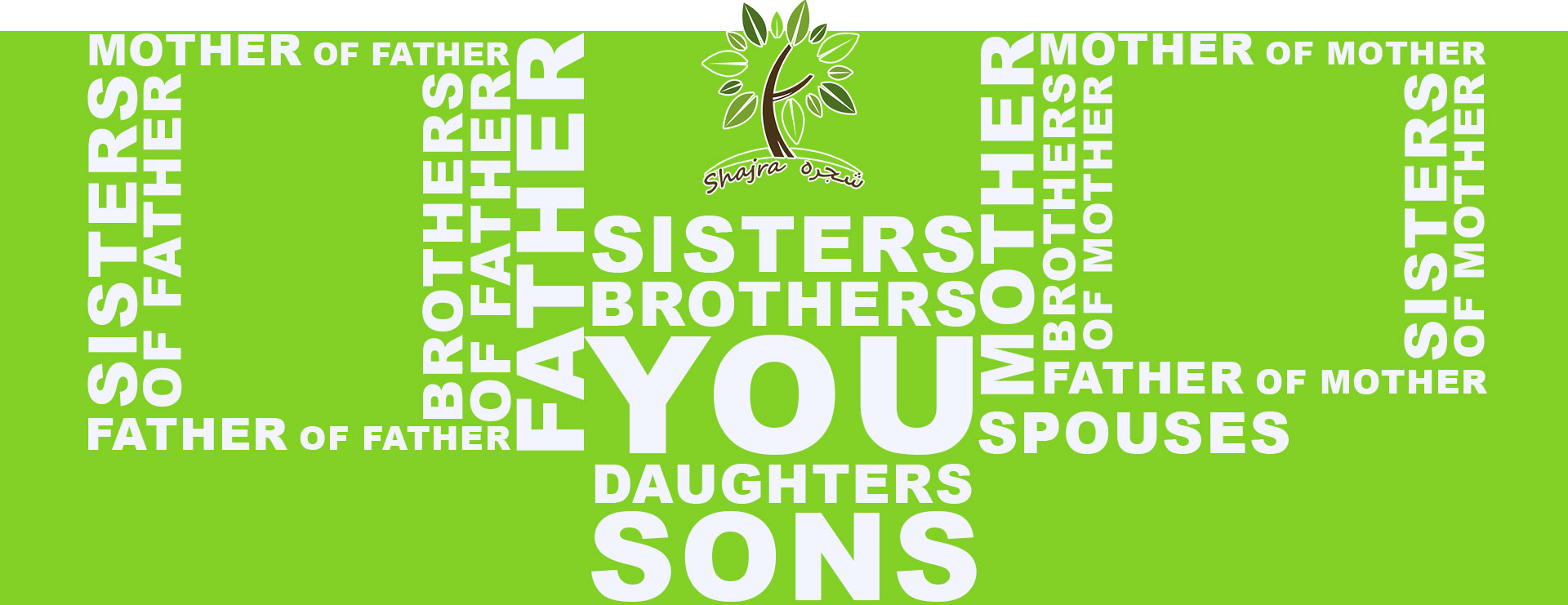
Basic Shajra Chart

A Shajra records the ancestors from whom you directly descend and presents family information in the form of an easily readable chart. Shajra is often presented with the oldest generations at the top of the tree and the younger generations at the bottom and the most basic Shajra is made up of family members such as father, mother, father of father, father of mother, mother of mother, father's siblings, mother's siblings, spouse(s), and children.

== See also ==
- Banjar, Jungle, Abadi, Shamlat, Gair Mumkin
- Barani, Nahri, Chahi, Taal
- Bigha
- Doab
- Khadir and Bangar
- Khasra
- Measurement of land in Punjab
- Patwari
- Zaildar
