= Chugawan =

Village in Punjab, India

Chugawan Chogawan
- Village

Cugāvāṁ transcription(s)
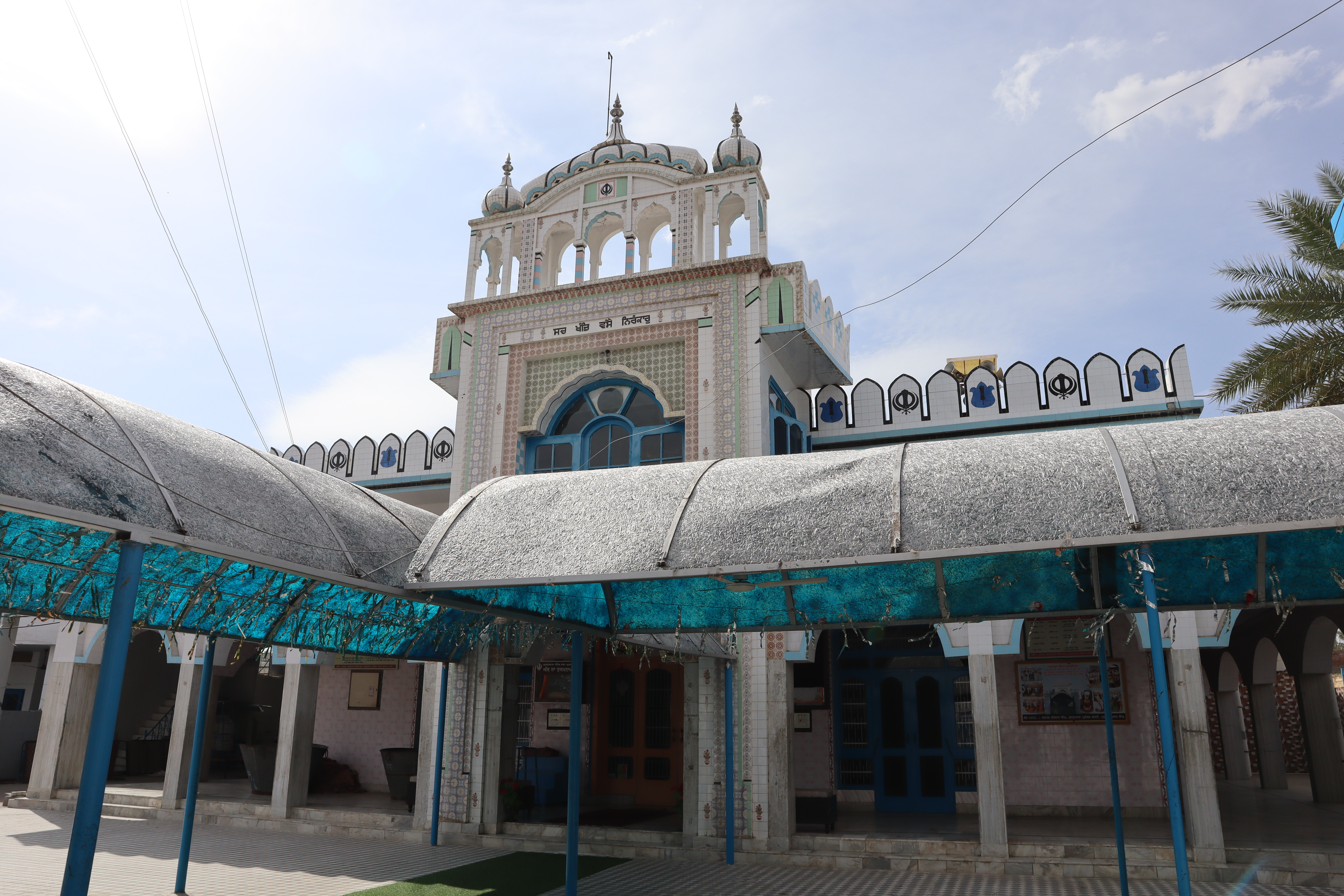
- Photograph of a gurdwara located in Chugawan village, Moga district, Punjab, India, April 2023

- Location in Punjab, India Chugawan (India)
- Coordinates: 30°49′45″N 75°16′00″E
- Country: India

Area
  - Total: 6.27 km^{2} (2.42 sq mi)

Population (2011)
  - Total: 2,420

Languages
  - Official: Punjabi

Chugawan, sometimes spelt as Chogawan or Chuganwan, is a village located in the Moga district of Punjab, India. It is located 12 km (7.5 mi) east of Moga, the principal city of the Moga district. The total literacy rate of Chugawan is 79.49%, out of which the individual literacy values by sex are 85.91% for males and 72.12% for females of the locality. There are about 497 houses located in the village.

== History ==
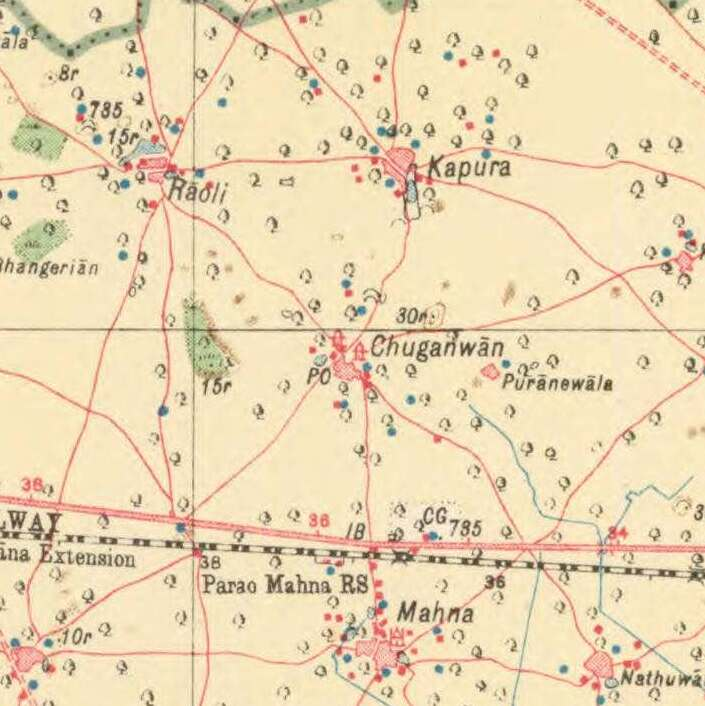
Chugawan village in Moga tehsil, Survey of India geographical block-map for 44 N NW Ferozepore (1921)

According to 19th century land-records, the village was founded by Sodhis and Gill Jats. According to Charles Francis Massy, the Sodhis of Chugawan, Moga, and Sodhiwala in Malwa are descended from Chandsain, the youngest son of Prithi Chand, who was the eldest son of Guru Ram Das. Descendants of Awwal Khair live in Chugawan, they belong to the Wadan muhin of the Gill gotra of Jats. The land-records state that the area was once barren-land. For the tax-collection, whenever a crop was planted, a portion had to be submitted and there was a fixed amount per area. In the 19th century, there was a dispute between the Sodhis and Gills against a third-party, however the Sodhis and Gills were re-affirmed to their ownership of the land.

During World War I, at-least thirty-five local men from Chugawan served in the British Indian Army during the war, with at-least three of them dying and one whose status was not traceable.

== Land records ==
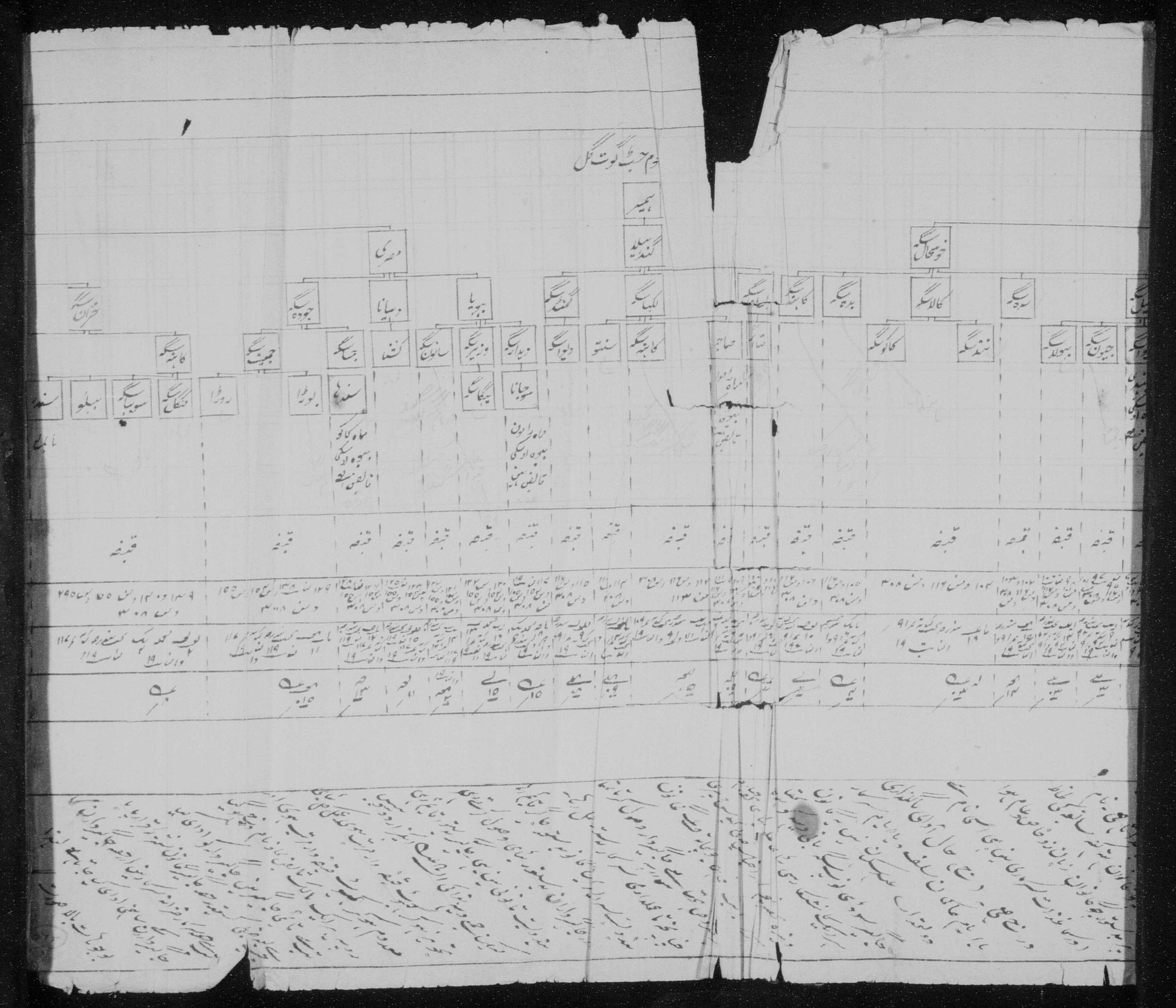
Example of a genealogical pedigree (family-tree) of a landowning family of Chugawan village in Moga district (formerly part of Ferozepore district), Punjab, 1887–1888

Shajjra Nasb (also known as Kursee Nama (Note: Kursee Nama is also spelt as 'Kurseenama' or 'Kursinama'.)) records of Chugawan village from 1887–1888 and 1953–1954 have been digitized by the Church of Jesus Christ of Latter-day Saints via FamilySearch and are available for online viewing. These records detail land ownership pedigrees for families of the village.

== Culture ==
The village belongs to the Malwai culture and the Malwai dialect of Punjabi is spoken by the locals.

There is a shrine in the village dedicated to a fakir named Baba Sayyad Kabir, who is believed to be buried there. It is believed that offering salt at the shrine cures warts. There is a one-day mela festival held in Chugawan during the month of Chet (March-April) dedicated to the saint.

== Gallery ==
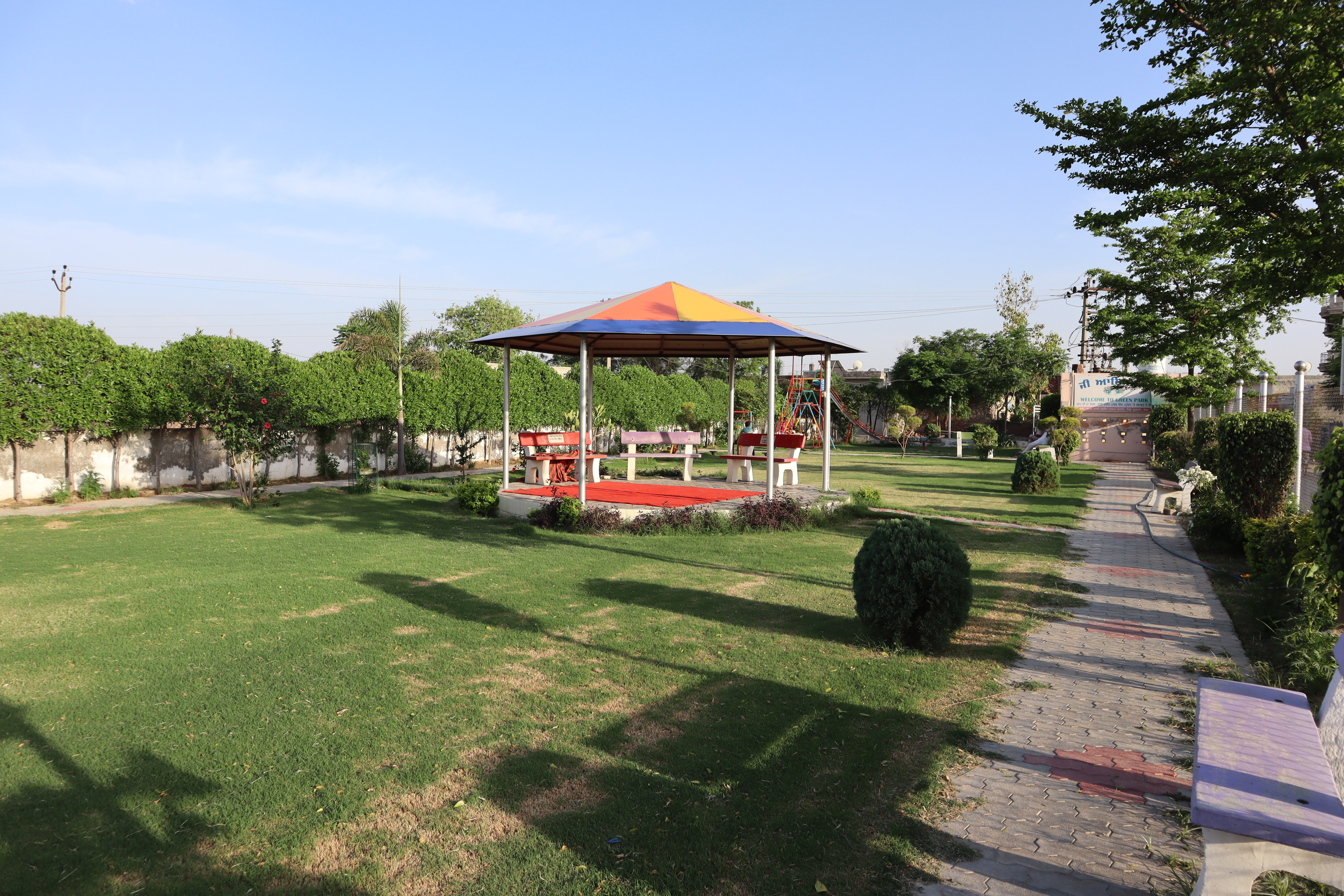
Green Park

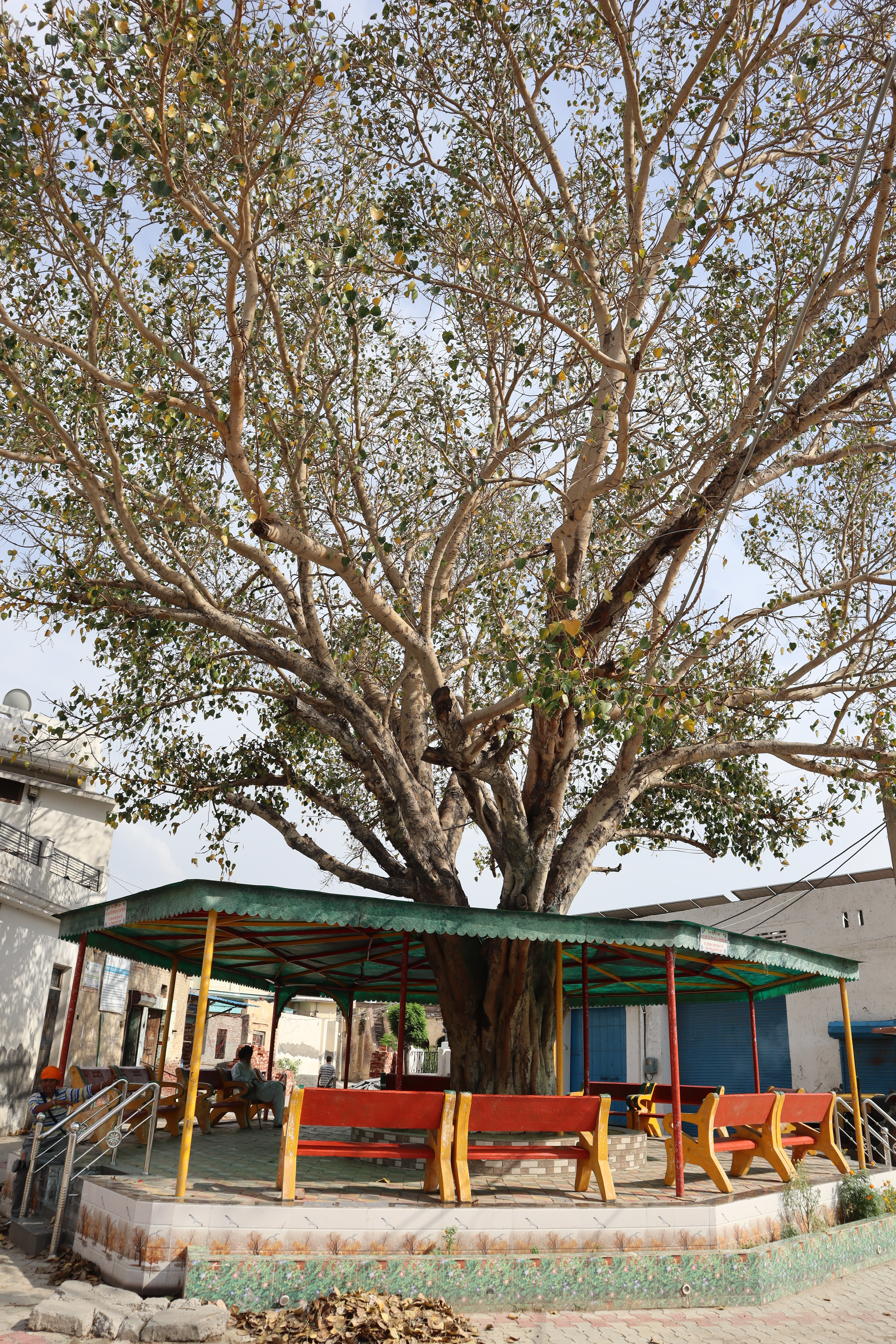
Traditional meeting-place (known as a sath) under an old tree

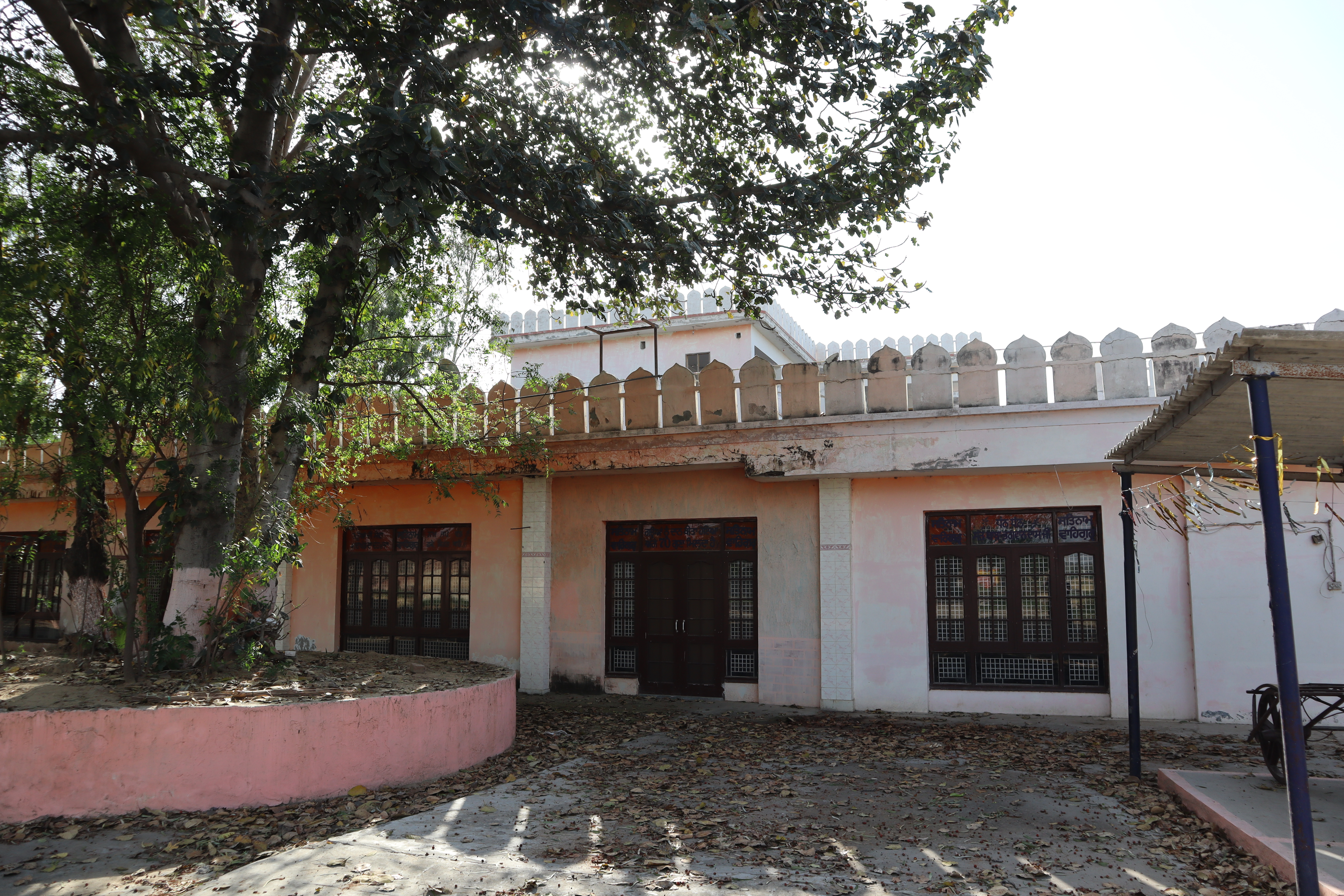
Udasi-affiliated religious compound

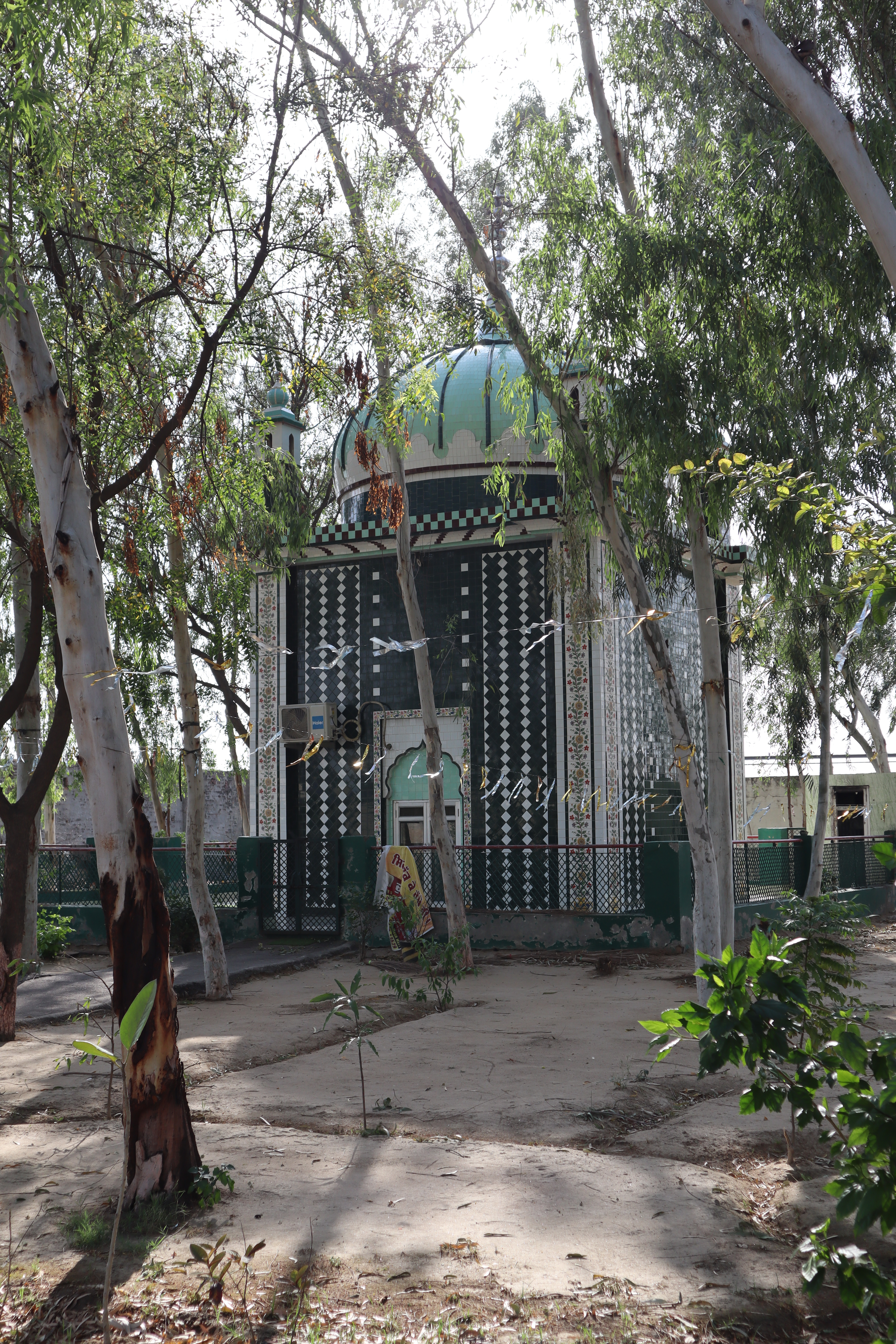
Dargah of Baba Sayyad Kabir

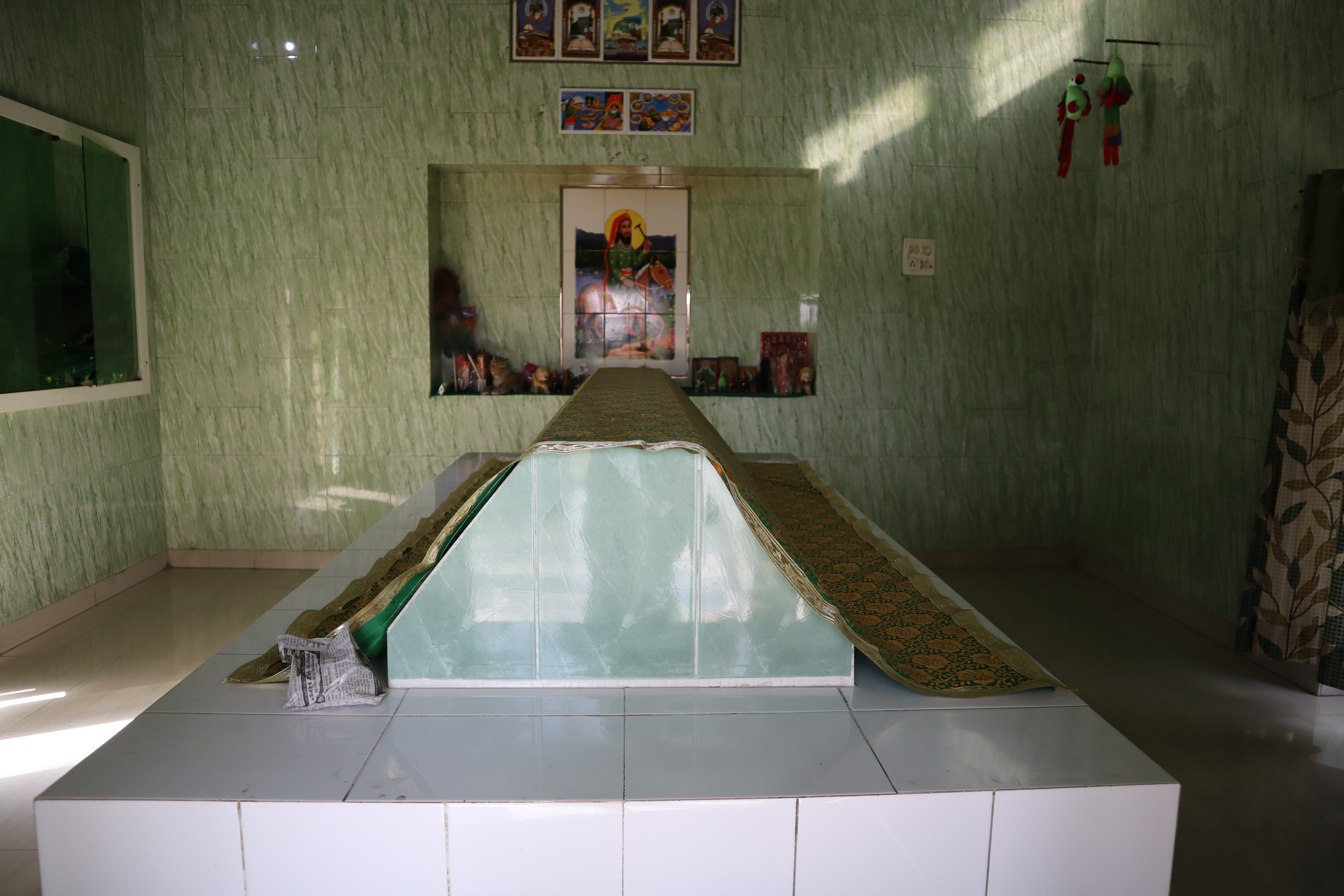
Grave of Baba Sayyad Kabir within his dargah

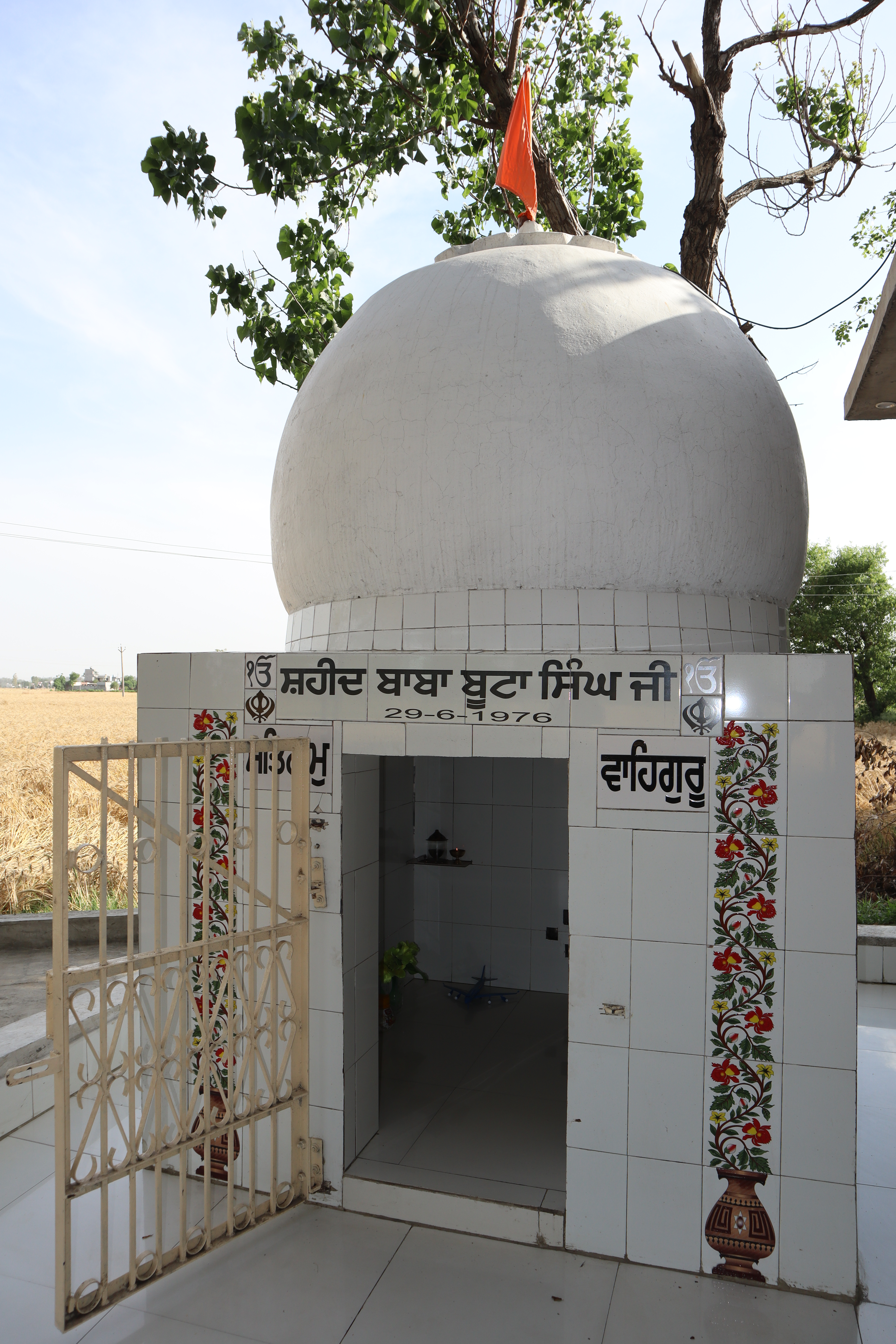
Punjabi folk religion shrine of Baba Buta located on the outskirts of Chugawan village

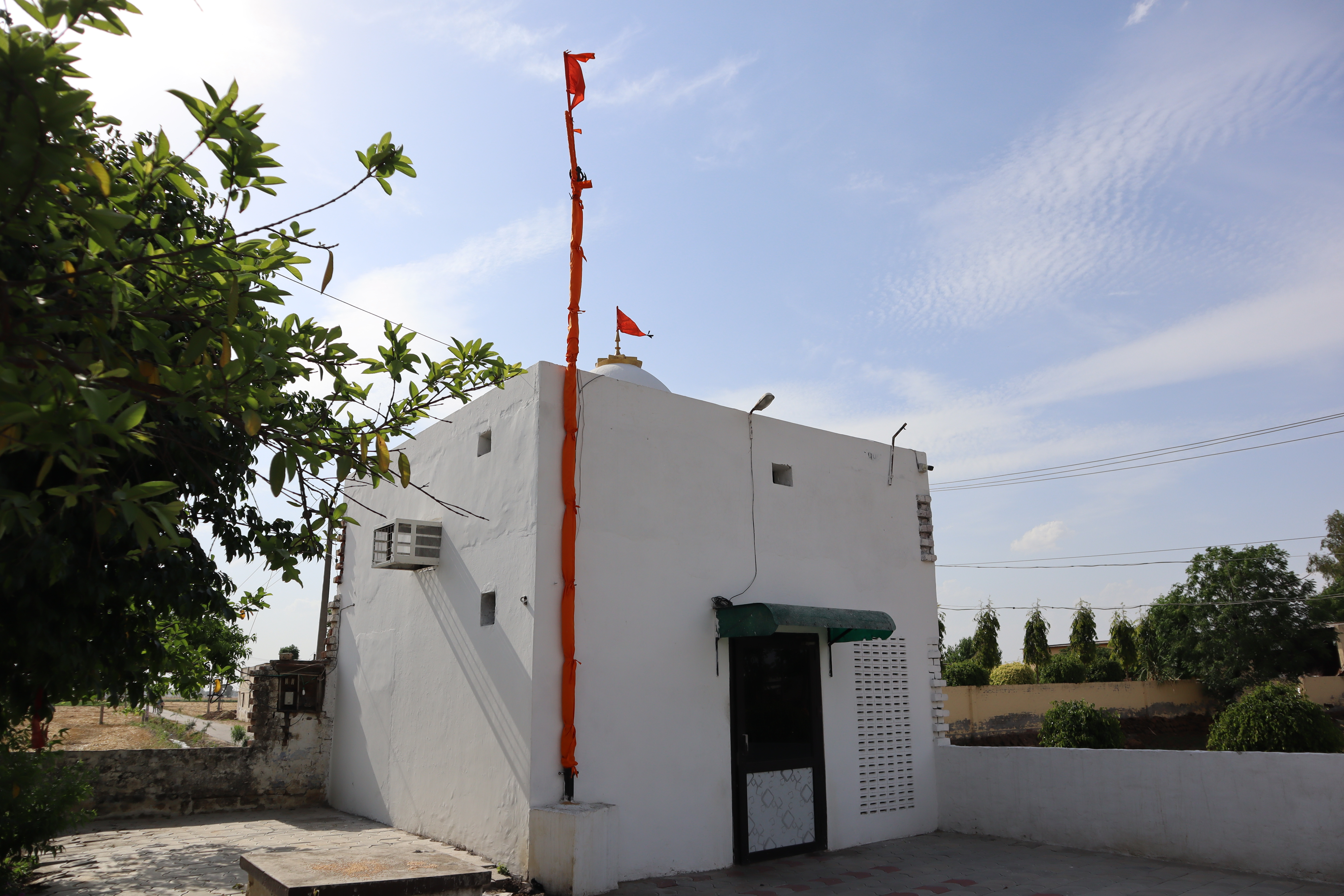
Punjabi folk religion shrine of Baba Sidh in Chugawan village

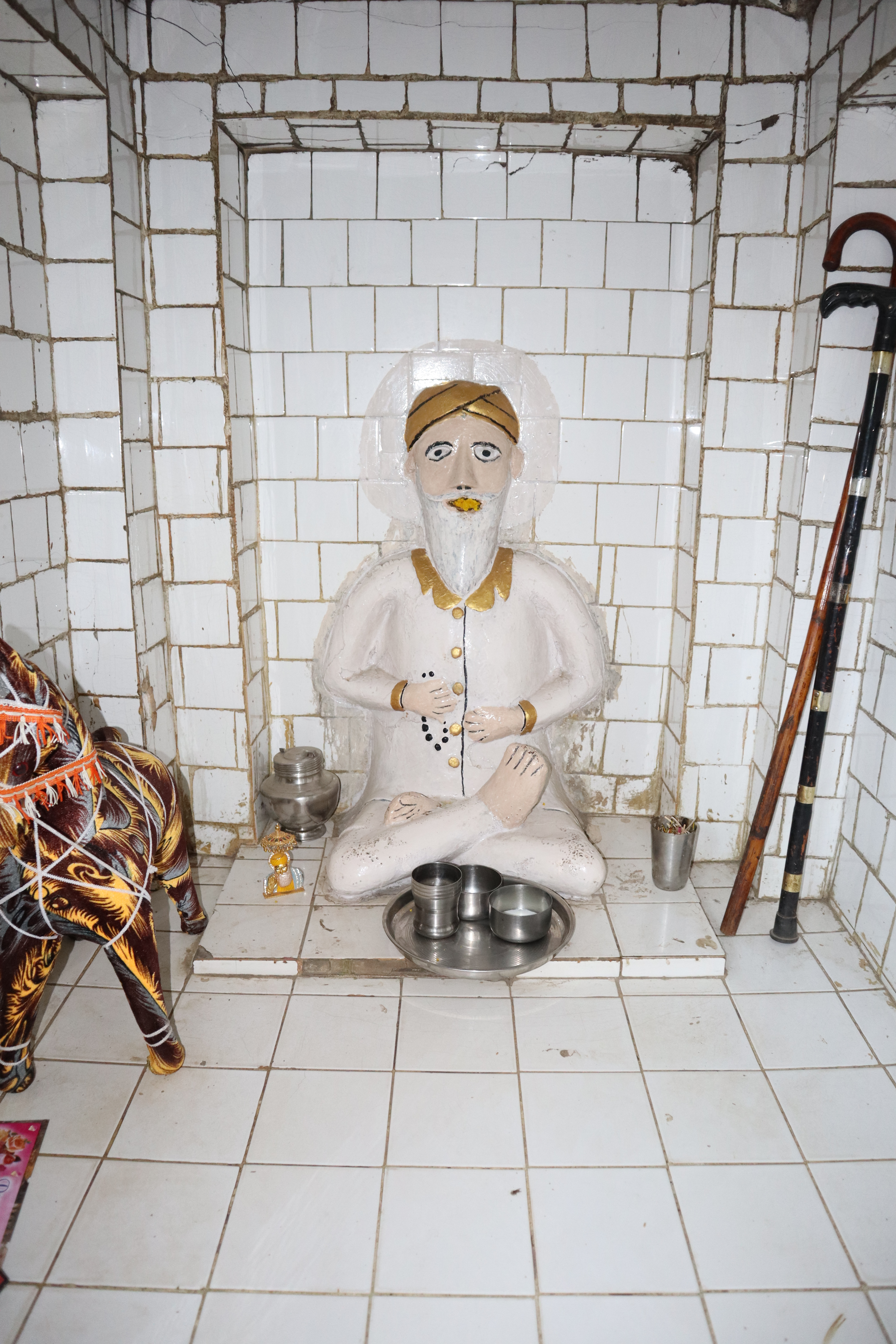
Idol of Baba Sidh located within a Punjabi folk religion shrine in Chugawan village
