= Rampur Bangar =

- Village
- Location in Uttar Pradesh, India Rampur Bangar (India)
- Coordinates: 28.30°N 77.57°E
- Country: India
- State: Uttar Pradesh
- District: Gautam Buddha Nagar District

Languages
  - Official: Hindi
- Time zone: UTC+5:30 (IST)
- PIN: 203135

Rampur Bangar is a village in the Gautam Budh Nagar district.
