= Salarpur Khadar =

Coordinates: 9.2167°N 1.8500°W

- town
- Interactive map of Salarpur Khadar
- Country: India
- State: Uttar Pradesh
- District: Gautam Buddha Nagar

Population (2001)
  - Total: 10,772

Language
  - Official: Hindi
  - Additional official: Urdu
- Time zone: UTC+5:30 (IST)
- PIN: 201304
- Telephone code: 0120
- Vehicle registration: u.p. 16
- Sex ratio: 1:1 ♂/♀

Salarpur Khadar is a census town in Gautam Buddha Nagar district in the Indian state of Uttar Pradesh.

== Community ==
The main community in this village is the Bhati Rajput clan, who trace their roots back to Rao Kasal Singh Bhati. He was a chieftain originally from Jaisalmer in present-day Rajasthan. According to historian, Rao Kasal Singh migrated to this area and set up Kasna-another village in Greater Noida with a strong Bhati Rajput presence—as his capital. From there, the influence of the Bhati Rajput clan spread to the surrounding regions.This larger region, which includes around 360 villages connected to the Bhati Rajput community, is locally called mini Bhatner. The name comes from the historical dominance of the Bhati Rajput clan in the area.

Out of these villages, about 150 are mainly Bhati Hindu Rajputs, while roughly 160 are home to Bhati Muslim Rajputs

Ghodi Bachheda, is often regarded as one of the most prominent and influential Bhati Rajput villages in the area.

In terms of population, the numbers of Salarpur are around 10,000 people, with about 8,000 belonging to the Bhati Rajput community. On a larger scale, the Gautam Buddha Nagar Lok Sabha constituency is estimated to have a Rajput population of over 450,000 to 500,000, highlighting the significance of the community is in the district.

Politically, the influence of the Bhati Rajput community is evident. For example Thakur Dhirendra Singh Bhati, is elected as the MLA for the 3rd time from the Jewar constituency in Greater Noida. His election reflects the community’s ongoing importance in local politics.

== Demographics ==
As of 2001 India census, Salarpur Khadar had a population of 10,772. Males constitute 58% of the population and females 42%. Salarpur Khadar has an average literacy rate of 66%, higher than the national average of 59.5%: male literacy is 75%, and female literacy is 53%. In Salarpur Khadar, 19% of the population is under 6 years of age.
