= Prahlad Pur Bangar =

- Village
- Prahlad Pur Bangar
- Location in India
- Coordinates: 28.749584°N 77.079292°E
- Country: India
- Union Territory: Delhi
- District: North West

Population (2001)
  - Total: 10,548

Languages
  - Official: Hindi, English, Haryanvi
- Time zone: UTC+5:30 (IST)
- PIN Code: 110042

Prahlad Pur Bangar is a village located in Sector 31, Rohini, North West District in the Indian Union Territory of Delhi.

== Demographics ==
Historical population
Year	Pop.	±%
1981	5,011	—
1991	4,832	−3.6%
2001	10,554	+118.4%
2011	22,968	+117.6%
Source: Government of India

As of 2001 India census, Prahlad Pur (Bangar) had a population of 10,548. Males constitute 56% of the population and females 44%. Prahlad Pur (Bangar) has an average literacy rate of 69%, higher than the national average of 59.5%: male literacy is 76%, and female literacy is 60%. In Prahlad Pur (Bangar), 17% of the population is under 6 years of age. A famous Vaternity hospital in this area.

== History ==
1st Martyr Fighter of Prahlad Pur village, Shri Kartar Singh Sindhu, batch 2648550, 2 Grenadiers, sacrificed his life at age 25 in the Nathula Operation against China on 11 September 1967. His sacrifice was recorded in National War Memorial, Delhi at 4C Row.

2nd Martyr Fighter of Prahlad Pur village, Shri Phulkumar Mann, was martyred in the Indian Army on the post of NCP on 29 July 1976 in the clash with Pakistan in Jammu and Kashmir by making the supreme sacrifice.

== Education ==
Govt Sarvodaya Bal Vidyalaya School was established in 1952. It is the oldest school in North West Delhi, It hosts a high class sports complex.

== Culture ==
Devta wala temple (300 yrs Old), Old Shiv Mandir (200 yrs old), and Kali Mata temple are there.

Chotu Ram Park and Baba Shaeb Ambadker Park are there.
