= Khasra =

A Khasra Girdawari (Hindustani: ख़सरा or خسره گرداوری) is a legal Revenue Department document used in India and Pakistan that specifies land and crop details. It is often used in conjunction with a shajra (or shajra kishtwar), which is a family tree of owner; used for reference map of the village that administers the land described by the khasra girdawari. Khasras traditionally detail "all the fields and their areas, measurement, who owns and what cultivators he employs, what crops, what sort of soil, what trees are on the land.". In Indian Land record system, "Khatauni" is an account book, "Khasra girdawari" is a survey book and "Sajra" is the village map. At village level, patwari is appointed to update and maintain these land records.

== History ==
Systematic khasra documentation in the Indian subcontinent has existed for several centuries, far predating the British colonial period. Medieval khasra documents are a useful source for historians in reconstructing the economic history in specific areas of India and Pakistan.

== See also ==
- Banjar, Jungle, Abadi, Shamlat, Gair Mumkin
- Barani, Nahri, Chahi, Taal
- Bigha
- Doab
- Khadir and Bangar
- Khasra
- Measurement of land in Punjab
- Patwari
- Shajra
- Zaildar
- Village accountant
