= Decimal (unit) =

Obsolete unit of area in India and Bangladesh

A decimal (also spelled decimil or dismil; Bengali: শতক) is a unit of area in India and Bangladesh. After metrication in the mid-20th century by both countries, the unit became officially obsolete. However, it is still in use among the rural population in Bangladesh and West Bengal.

A decimal is one hundredth of an acre of land, and is equal to 48.4 square yards or 435.6 square feet (40.47 m^{2}). Decimals are also used as a measure of land in West Africa.

== Conversion chart ==
1 decimal in common area units
Unit	Value
Square feet	435.6
Acres	0.01
Hectares	0.0040468564
Square metres	40.468564
Square inches	62,726.4
Square yards	48.4
Square centimetres	404,685.64

== See also ==
- List of customary units of measurement in South Asia
