= Marla (unit) =

Unit of area

A marla is a unit of area used in the Indian subcontinent. Marla is equal to 30.25 square yard or 272.25 square feet. 20 marla is equals to one Kanal and 160 marla is one Acre.

== Description ==
=== British raj standard marla ===
The marla is a traditional unit of area that is used in India, Pakistan and Bangladesh. The marla was standardized under British Raj to be equal to the square rod, or 272.25 square feet, 30.25 square yards, or 25.292853 square metres. It is exactly 1/160 Acre and 1/20 Kanal.

=== Differing marla measurements standards in India ===
The definition of marla varies between India . In India, the unit was standardized to 25 square yards. Its use in India is in decline, with the guz, square meter, acre and hectare being the more commonly used units. Bangladesh and Pakistan use the same definition of marla as in India. The old British definition of marla is often referred to as a "big marla" in India.

==== Indian marla ====
The units of measurement for marla in India, specially in Punjab, are:

Marla

– 1(Karm) = 5.5 Ft
– 1(Sarsahi) = 5.5 Ft x 5.5 Ft = 30.25 Sq.Ft.
– 1 Marla = 9 Sarsahi = 30.25 x 9 = 272.25 Sq.Ft. (1 Marla)

== Conversion table ==
Conversion table for British raj Marla to Indian:

British raj imperial	Metric	Indian marla
1 square foot (144 square inches)		0.040 sarsahi
1 square yard (9 sq. feet)	.836 sq. metres	0.360 sarsahi (0.040 marla)
1.196 sq. yards (10.76 sq. feet)	1 square metre	0.431 sarsahi (0.0478 marla)
1 sq. yards (9 sq. feet)	0.836 sq. metres	1 sarsahi (0.111 marla)
3.361 sq. yards (30.25 sq. feet)	2.810 sq. metres	1.21 sarsahi (0.134 marla)
30.25 sq. yards (272.25 sq. feet = 0.0625 acres)	25.293 sq. metres	1 marla (9 sarsahi)
605 sq. yards (0.125 acres)	505.857 sq. metres (0.0506 hectares)	24.2 marla
1 acre (4840 sq. yards)	0.405 hectares (4046.856 sq. metres)	193.6 marla
2.471 acres	1 hectare (10000 sq. metres = 0.01 sq. kilometres)	478.396 marla
247.1 acres (0.386 sq. miles)	1 square kilometre (100 hectares)	47,839.6 marla
1 square mile (640 acres)	2.590 sq. kilometres (259.0 hectares)	123,904 marla

== See also ==
- Kanal (unit)
