= Square yard =

Unit of area

square yard
- Unit system: Imperial, United States customary units
- Unit of: area
- Symbol: yd^{2}, sq yd

Conversions
1 yd^{2} in ...	... is equal to ...
- Imperial/US: 1296 sq in; 9 sq ft
- SI units: 8361.2736 cm^{2}; 0.8361 m^{2}

Comparison of 1 square yard with some Imperial and metric units of area

The square yard (Northern India: gaj, Pakistan: gaz) is an imperial unit and U.S. customary unit of area. It is in widespread use in most of the English-speaking world, particularly the United States, United Kingdom, Canada, Pakistan and India. It is defined as the area of a square with sides of one yard (three feet, thirty-six inches, 0.9144 metres) in length.

== Symbols ==
There is no universally agreed symbol but the following are used:

- square yards, square yard, square yds, square yd
- sq yards, sq yard, sq yds, sq yd, sq.yd.
- yards/-2, yard/-2, yds/-2, yd/-2
- yards^2, yard^2, yds^2, yd^2
- yards², yard², yds², yd²

== Conversions ==
One square yard is equivalent to:

- 1,296 square inches
- 9 square feet
- ≈0.00020661157 acres
- ≈0.000000322830579 square miles
- 836 127.36 square millimetres
- 8 361.2736 square centimetres
- 0.83612736 square metres
- 0.000083612736 hectares
- 0.00000083612736 square kilometres

== See also ==
- 1 E-1 m² for a comparison with other areas
- Area (geometry)
- Conversion of units
- Cubic yard
- Metrication in Canada
- Orders of magnitude (area)
- Square (algebra), Square root
