= Rajpur =

Rajpur may refer to several places in India and Nepal :

== India ==
- Rajpur, Bihar Assembly constituency
- Rajpur, Narkatiaganj, a village in West Champaran, Bihar
- Rajpur, Siwan, a village in Siwan, Bihar
- Rajpur, Balrampur, a block in Chhattisgarh
- Rajpur (Kathiawar), a former princely state of the Kathiawar Agency
- Rajpur, Sonipat, a village in Haryana
- Rajpur Gomtipur, a neighbourhood of Ahmedabad, Gujarat
- Rajpur, Madhya Pradesh, a town in Barwani District of Madhya Pradesh
  - Rajpur tehsil
  - Rajpur, Madhya Pradesh (Vidhan Sabha constituency)
- Rajpur, Ramabai Nagar, in Uttar Pradesh
- Rajpur, Sonbhadra, a village in Uttar Pradesh
- Rajpur, Varanasi, a village in Uttar Pradesh
- Rajpur, Dehradun, in Uttarakhand
  - Rajpur (Uttarakhand Assembly constituency)
- Rajpur, Udham Singh Nagar, in Uttarakhand
- Rajpur Sonarpur, part of greater Kolkata, West Bengal
- Rajpur Dhansoi panchayat
- Rajpur, Chatra, a village in Jharkhand
- Rajouri, also Rajpur, city in Jammu and Kashmir, India

== Nepal ==
- Rajpur, Lumbini, a town in Kapilvastu district
- Rajpur, Rapti, a town in Dang Deokhuri district
- Rajpur, Sagarmatha, a town in Siraha district
- Rajpur Farhadawa, a town in Rautahat district
- Rajpur Tulsi, a town in Rautahat district

== See also ==
- Alirajpur (or Rajpur), city and former princely state in India
- Rajpur Assembly constituency (disambiguation)
- Raipur (disambiguation)
- Rajapur (disambiguation)
- Rajpuri (disambiguation)
- Rajnagar (disambiguation)
