= Rajapur =

Rajapur may refer to:

== Places ==
=== Bangladesh ===
- Rajapur, Khulna, a village in Rupsha Upazila, Khulna
- Rajapur Upazila, an Upazila of Jhalokati District in the Division of Barisal, Bangladesh

=== India ===
- Kharua Rajapur, a village in Bongaon, West Bengal
- Rajapur, Allahabad, a township of Allahabad, Uttar Pradesh
- Rajapur, Ghazipur, a village in Ghazipur District, Uttar Pradesh
- Rajapur, Gonda, a village in Gonda District, Uttar Pradesh, believed to be the birthplace of Tulsidas, the creator of Ramcharitmanas
- Rajapur, Karnataka, a village in Belgaum district, Karnataka
- Rajapur (Ludhiana West), a village in Ludhiana district, Punjab
- Rajapur, Maharashtra, a city and municipal council in Ratnagiri district, Maharashtra
  - Rajapur (Lok Sabha constituency)
- Rajapur, Uttar Pradesh, a town and tahsil of Chitrakoot district, Uttar Pradesh
- Rajapur, Garwara, a village in Garwara, Uttar Pradesh
- Rajapur, Shivgarh, a village in Raebareli district, Uttar Pradesh
- Rajapur, Singhpur, Raebareli, a village in Raebareli district, Uttar Pradesh
- Rajapur taluka, a taluka in Ratnagiri district, Maharashtra
- Rajapur block, Ghaziabad district, Uttar Pradesh
- Rajapur, Canning, a census town in South 24 Parganas district, West Bengal

=== Nepal ===
- Rajapur, Nepal, a municipality in Bardiya District

== Other uses ==
- Rajapur (Lok Sabha constituency), a former parliamentary constituency of Maharashtra
- Rajapur (Vidhan Sabha constituency), a legislative constituency of Maharashtra

== See also ==
- Rajapura, the capital of Kalinga in the ancient Indian epic Mahabharata
- Rajapura (Kamboja), the capital of the Kamboja people in the epic
- Rajpur (disambiguation)
- Rajanpur (disambiguation), places in Pakistan
