= Raipura =

Raipura may refer to several places:

- Raipura, Firozabad, Uttar Pradesh
- Raipura, Jabalpur, Madhya Pradesh
- Raipura, Panna, Madhya Pradesh
- Raipura Municipality, Bangladesh
- Raipura Upazila, Bangladesh

== See also ==
- Raipur (disambiguation)
- Rajpur (disambiguation)
- Rajpura
