= Rajnagar =

Rajnagar may refer to:

== Places ==
=== Bangladesh ===
- Rajnagar Upazila, a subdivision in Maulvibazar District, Bangladesh

=== India ===
- Raj Nagar Extension, an area in Ghaziabad, Uttar Pradesh
- Rajnagar (community development block), Birbhum district, West Bengal
- Rajnagar, Bhiwandi, a village in Maharashtra
- Rajnagar, Bihar, a town in Madhubani District, Bihar
  - Rajnagar, Bihar Assembly constituency, the Bihar assembly constituency centered around the town
- Rajnagar, Birbhum, a town in West Bengal
  - Rajnagar, Birbhum (Vidhan Sabha constituency), the defunct West Bengal constituency centered around the town
- Rajnagar, Chhatarpur, a town in Madhya Pradesh
  - Rajnagar, Madhya Pradesh Assembly constituency, the Madhya Pradesh assembly constituency centered around the town
- Rajnagar, Himachal Pradesh Assembly constituency, a defunct assembly constituency in Himachal Pradesh
- Rajnagar, Murshidabad, a village in West Bengal
- Rajnagar, Rajasthan, part of the twin city of Kankroli in Rajasthan
- Rajnagar, Seraikela Kharsawan, a village in Jharkhand
- Rajnagar, Tripura Assembly constituency, an assembly constituency in Tripura state

== See also ==
- Rajnagar Assembly constituency (disambiguation)
- Rajanagar Assembly constituency in Kendrapara district, Odisha
- Rajanagaram, neighbourhood in Coastal Andhra, Andhra Pradesh, India
  - Rajanagaram mandal, subdivision of Andhra Pradesh centred on the neighbourhood
  - Rajanagaram (Assembly constituency)
- Rajpur (disambiguation)
