= Sisana, Sonipat =

Sisana
- Village
- Location in Haryana, India Sisana (India)
- Coordinates: 28°54′10″N 76°51′00″E
- Country: India
- State: Haryana
- Region: North India
- District: Sonipat
- Established: ~1214

Government
  - Type: Haryana Government
  - Body: India

Population
  - Total: N/A

Languages
  - Official: Hindi, Haryanvi
- Time zone: UTC+5:30 (IST)
- PIN: 131408, 131402
- ISO 3166 code: IN-HR
- Vehicle registration: HR-79
- Website: haryana.gov.in

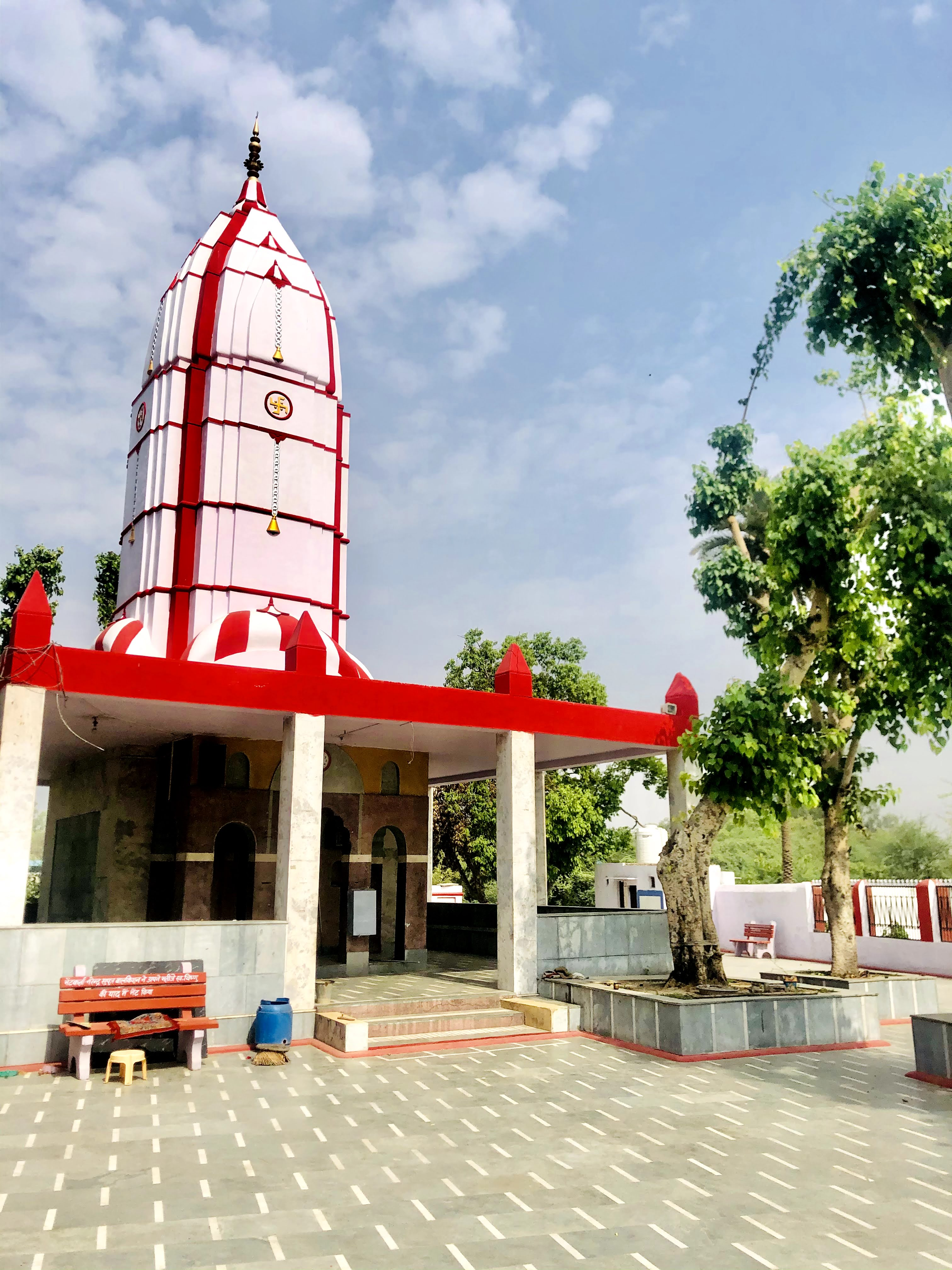
Old Shiva Temple in Sisana Village

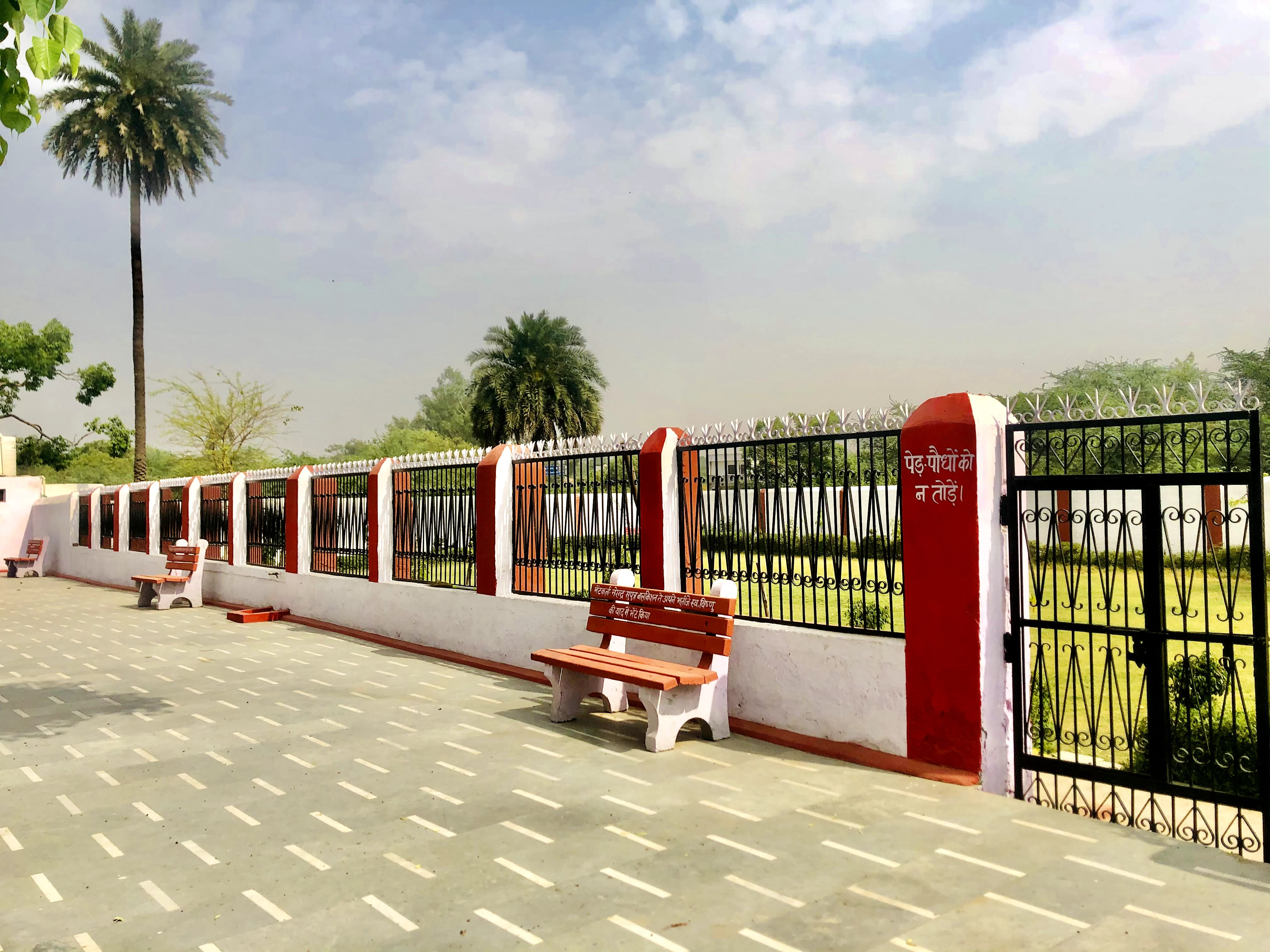
Temple park

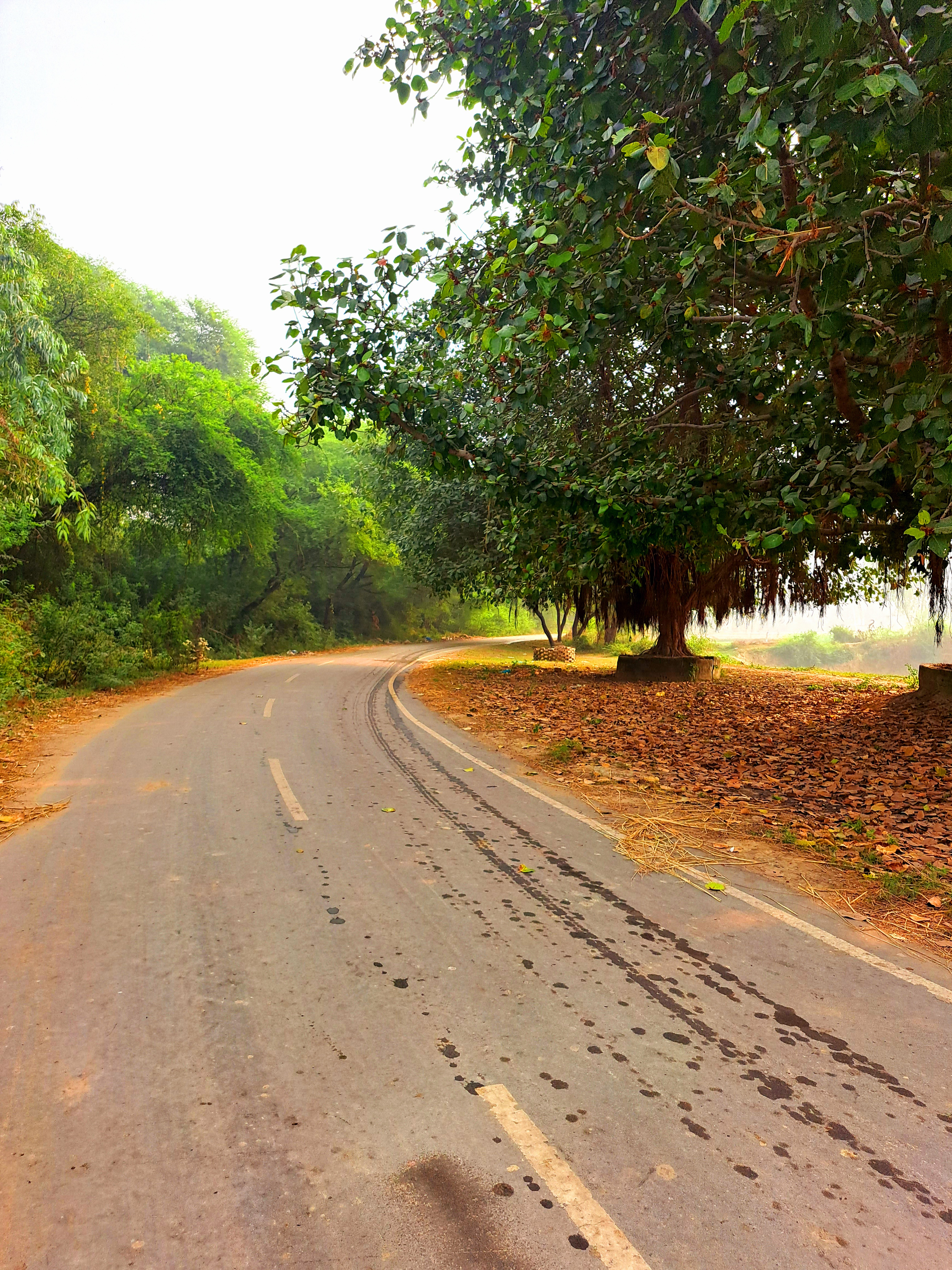
Banyan trees on the roadside of Sisana village

Sisana is a village of Sonipat district, in the Indian state of Haryana. This village comes under the Tehsil of Kharkhoda. The vehicle RTO falls under the same; the vehicle numbers start from HR79 and HR10 for private vehicles.

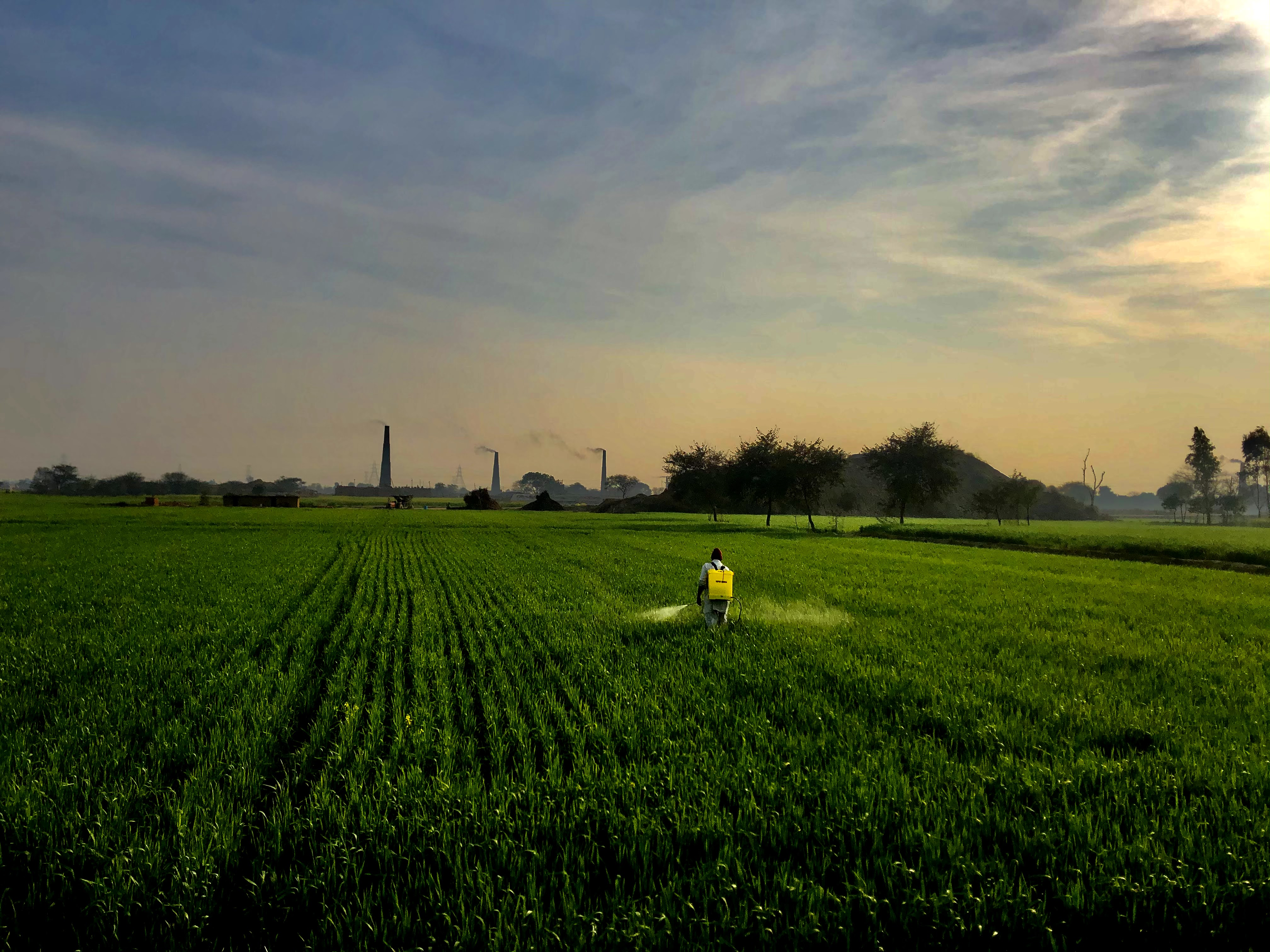
Fields in Sisana village

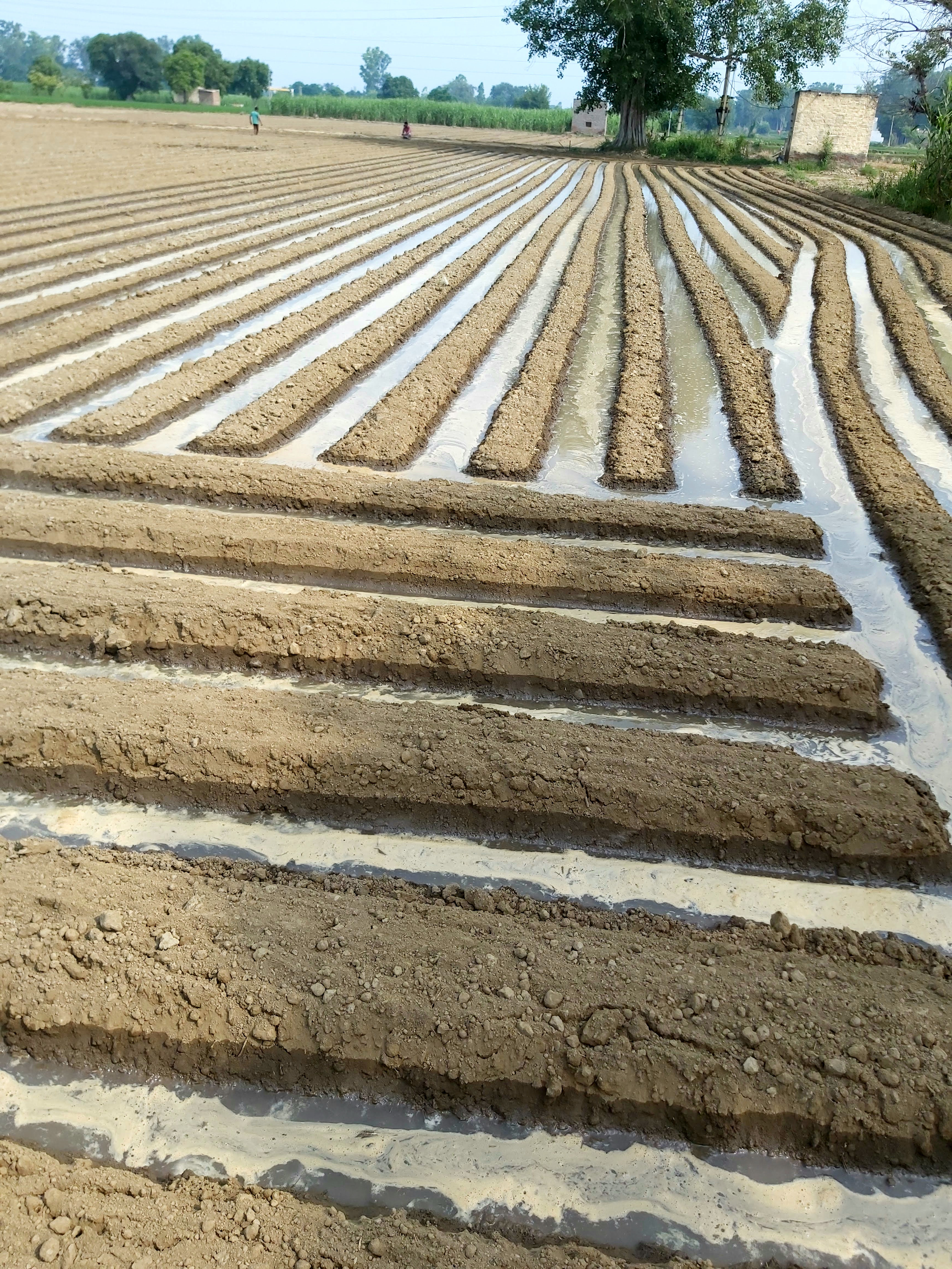
Irrigation pattern

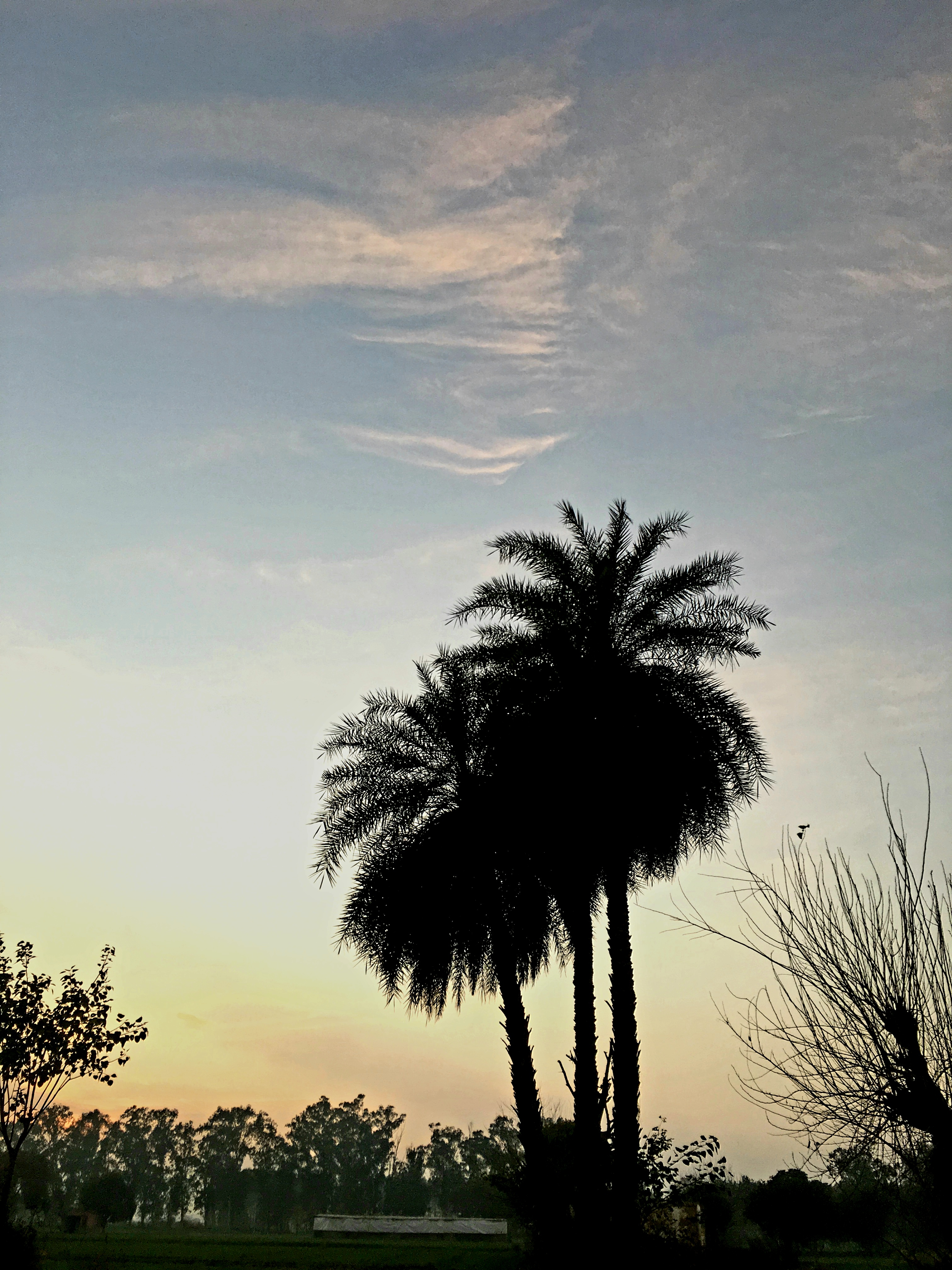
Dates tree

The village was first inhabited in 1221. The nearest villages are Khanda, Sehri, Bakheta, Farmana, Gorad, Humayupur, Kharkhauda, Matindu, and Silana. It is mainly inhabited by Dahiya Jats. and Kaushik Brahmins. Sisana is now divided into two parts (panchayat): Sisana1 and Sisana2.

Most of the population in the village is Hindu. The village is surrounded by many temples, including Shivalya Mandir, Khatu Shyam Mandir, Narayan Ashram, and Dhikkan wala mandir.

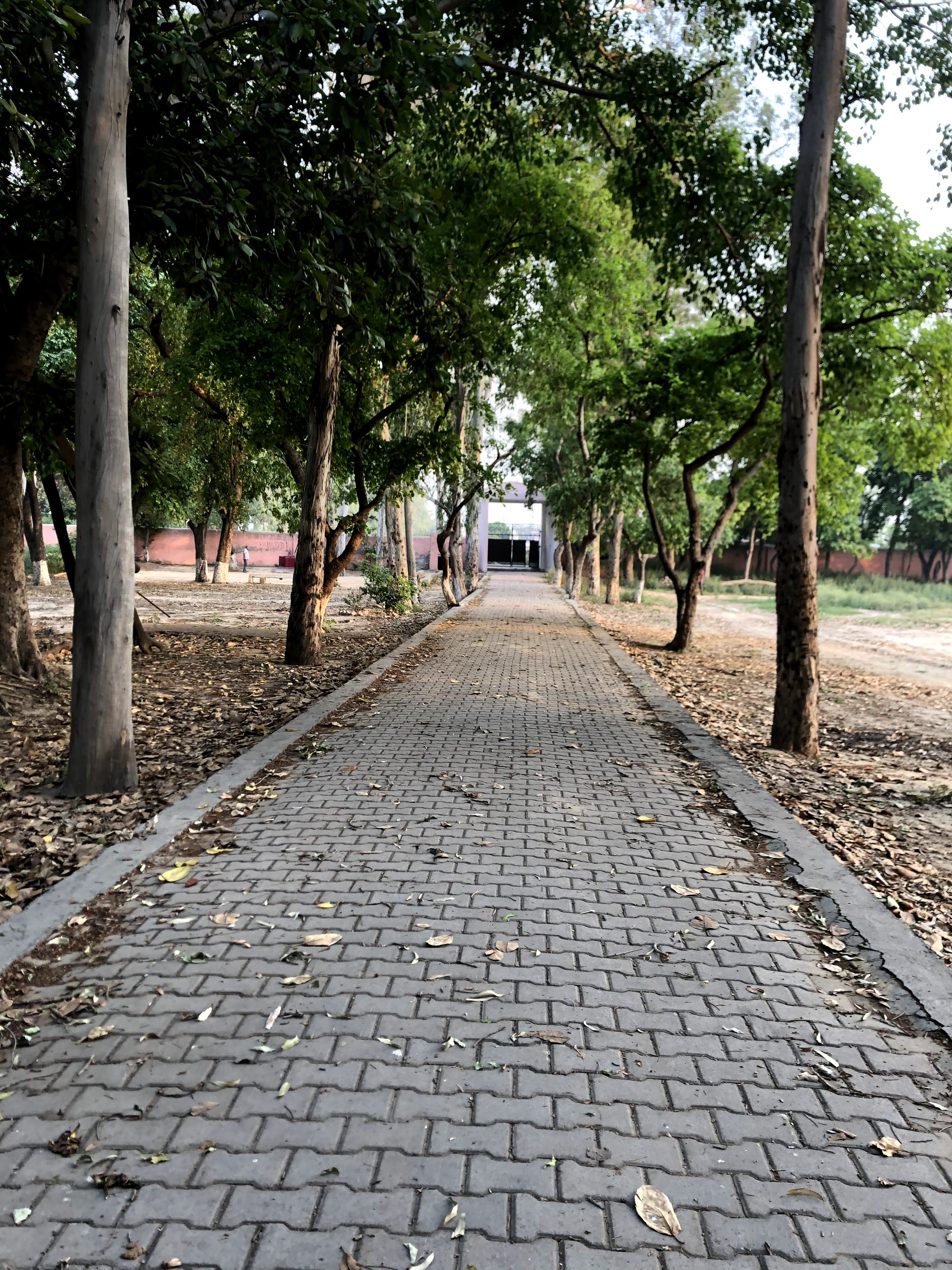
Govt High School in Sisana

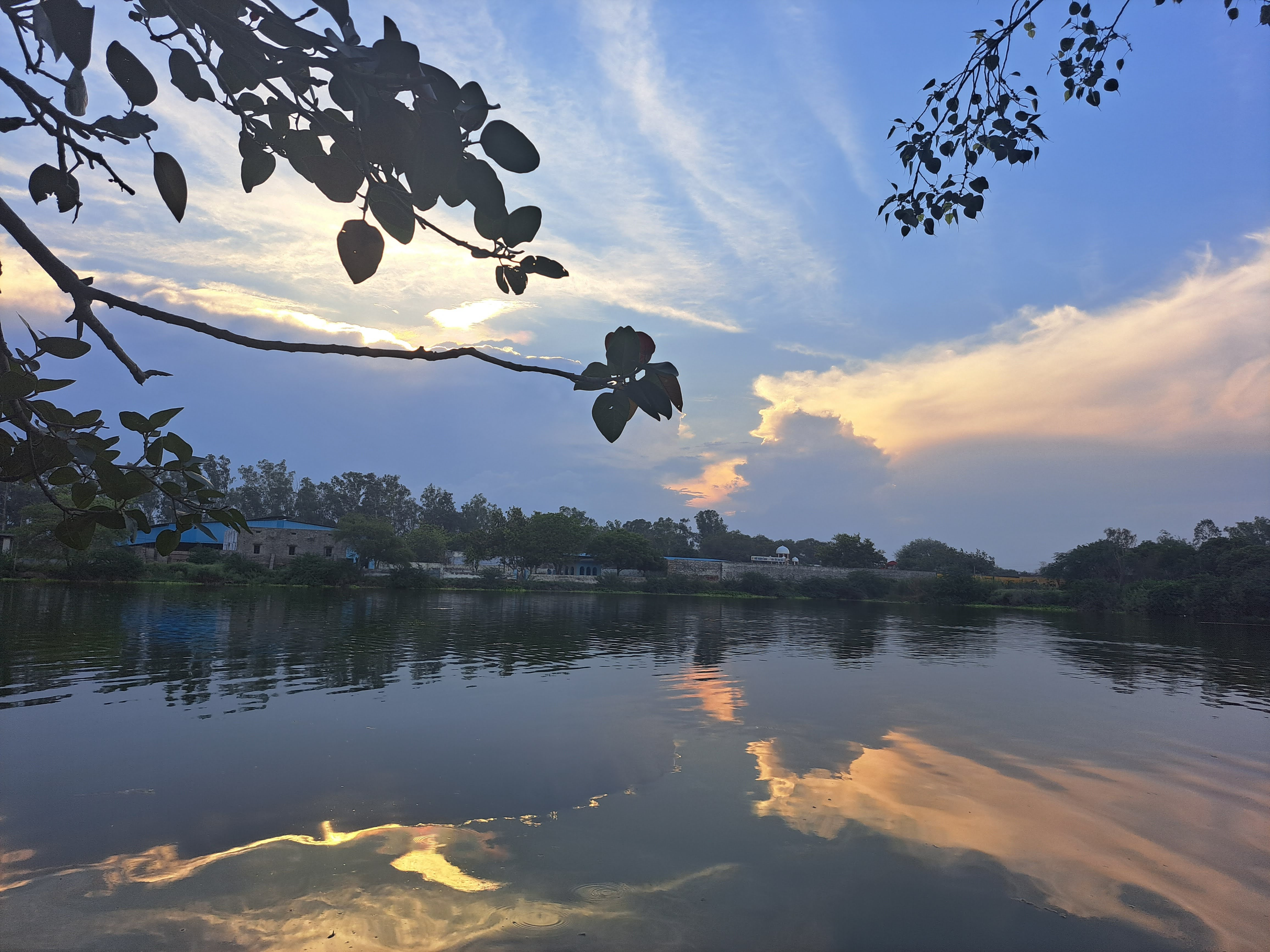
Shivalya pond

The village is surrounded by ponds and fields. A Shiv Mandir is in the centre of the village, which also has a park and a pond nearby. A major source of water is a canal which is locally called Bidro/Badro.

== Notable residents ==
- Baje Bhagat - artist
- Colonel Hoshiar Singh Dahiya - Param Vir Chakra awardee
