= Raipur (disambiguation) =

Raipur is the capital city of the state of Chhattisgarh, India.

It may also refer to the following places:

== India ==
- Raipur district of Chhattisgarh
  - Raipur (Lok Sabha constituency) in Chhattisgarh
- Raipur, Bhopal, a village in Bhopal district of Madhya Pradesh
- Raipur, Dahanu, a village in Maharshtra
- Raipur, Mansa, a village in Mansa district, Punjab
- Qila Raipur, a village in Ludhiana district, Punjab
  - Qila Raipur Assembly constituency, former electoral constituency of the Punjab Legislative Assembly
  - Qila Raipur Sports Festival, annual sports festival in Qila Raipur
- Raipur, Rajasthan, a village in Rajasthan
- Raipur, Uttarakhand, a census town in Dehradun district, Uttarakhand
  - Raipur (Uttarakhand Assembly constituency)
- Raipur, Birbhum, a village in Birbhum district, West Bengal
- Raipur, Bankura, a census town in Bankura district, West Bengal
  - Raipur, Bankura (community development block), an administrative division
  - Raipur, West Bengal Assembly constituency
- Raipur, Purba Bardhaman, a census town in Purba Bardhaman district, West Bengal
- Raipur, Khiron, a village in Raebareli district, Uttar Pradesh
- Raipur, Rohaniya, a village in Raebareli district, Uttar Pradesh
- Raipur, Sareni, a village in Raebareli district, Uttar Pradesh
- Raipur, Akhand Nagar, a village in Sultanpur district, Uttar Pradesh

== Elsewhere ==
- Raipur, Nepal
- Raipur, Pakistan, a village Khanewal District, Punjab, Pakistan
- Raipur Upazila, an upazila of Lakshmipur District, Bangladesh

== See also ==
- Nava Raipur, a planned city in Chhattisgarh, built to replace Raipur as the state capital
- Raipura (disambiguation)
- Rajpur (disambiguation)
- Rajpura, a city in Punjab, India
