= Qasim Mahmood =

Pakistani intellectual and Urdu writer

Syed Qasim Mahmood سید قاسم محمود
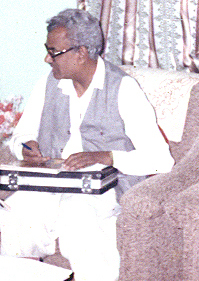
- Portrait of Syed Qasim Mahmood
- Born: Syed Qasim ali shah سید قاسم علی شاہ; 17 November 1928; Kharkhoda, Punjab, British India (now in Haryana, India)
- Died: 31 March 2010 (aged 81); Lahore, Pakistan
- Occupations: Encyclopedia Editor, Writer and Publisher
- Writing career
- Notable works: Encyclopedia Science, Encyclopedia of Astronomy, Encyclopedia of Inventions, Shahkar Islami Encyclopedia, Ilm-e-Quran, Seerat-Un-Nabi Encyclopedia, Encyclopedia Pakistanica, Shahkar Jiridi (magazine) books

Syed Qasim Mahmood (Urdu: سید قاسم محمود, 17 November 1928 – 31 March 2010) was a Pakistani intellectual and Urdu short story writer, novelist, editor, publisher, translator, and encyclopedist. Through his publishing companies, he published 211 books. He also wrote articles on literature, science, politics and sociology for national newspapers and magazines.

== Early life ==
Syed Qasim Ali Shah was born in Kharkhoda, a town in Sonipat district, British India. His father, Syed Hashim Ali Shah, was a landlord.

== Career ==
In 1948, he began working as a manager at the literary monthly Alamgir. In 1949, he began working on the weekly Khiam.

In January 1950, he got a clerical job at Punjab University, where he was active in promoting Urdu as the national language of Pakistan. Qasim organized the Urdu League organization and promoted the idea that university office work must be done in Urdu.

During his time at the university, he wrote articles for Mashiat. He began correspondence with Maulvi Abdul Haq, an Urdu scholar. Haq mistakenly believed that Qasim was a professor at Punjab University.

In December 1950, Punjab University began translating Encyclopedia of Islam, a project of Leiden University, into Urdu (Urdu Da'ira Ma'arif-i-Islamiya). He became an assistant to the editor-in-chief, Muhammad Shafi. He was also the editor of the newspaper Khwateen.

He worked for the publishing company Publishers United from 1951 to 1960.

== 1951 to 1960 ==
In October 1951, the Punjab government formed the Official Language Committee (Majlis-Zaban-i-Daftri), to translate English words in official works into Urdu. Only MA candidates were eligible for the committee. Qasim sent some of his translations to the committee's secretary, Hakim Ahmed Shuja, who allowed Qasim to apply for the job.

Qasim was one of 66 candidates. Because his level of education was below the requirement, Shuja sent his special case to the Governor of West Punjab Sardar Abdur Rab Nishtar. On 18 August 1951, Nishtar met with Qasim and gave him permission to work for the committee. Nishtar encouraged Qasim to focus on scientific and technological works, as they were rare in Urdu.

Qasim quit his university job and became a member of the Official Language Committee. Qasim started attending meetings of the Urdu literary movement, Halqa-e Arbab-e Zauq. He was also a regular attendee of Anjuman Tarraqi Pasand Mussanafin (Progressive Writers' Movement) meetings.

In 1952, Qasim translated his first novel, Guy de Maupassant's Une vie (Urdu: Aik Dil). Qasim contacted renowned Urdu short story writer Saadat Hasan Manto to write the foreword for Aik Dil. Manto insulted Qasim's writing before declining.

Qasim left his job with the Committee and started reading original short stories at Halqa-e Arbab-e Zauq meetings. He became the joint secretary of Halqa, a position he would retain until 1972. Pak Tea House, where Qasim was a regular, was a center for literary gatherings, especially for the Progressive Writer's Movement.

In 1955, he was admitted into the Urdu Department of the University Oriental College master's program. He did not complete his master's degree.

In 1956, Qasim worked for Maktaba Jadid, Gosha e adab, and Railway Book Stall publishing companies,. He also worked for Humayun, a monthly literary magazine, Ujala and Qandeel, weekly social magazines, and Imroz and Nawa-i-Waqt, national dailies. He worked as a sub-editor for the fortnightly Sadiq.

He wrote five Urdu textbooks for students of political science and economics, including Asan Mashiat (Economics made easy), Mashiat kay Jadid Nazeray (New theories of Economics), Mubadi Mashiat (Basics of Economics), and Usool Siasiat (Basics of Political Science).

He wrote Cleopatra Kee Kahani (Life of Queen Cleopatra) and Sikander Azam Kee Kahani (Life of Alexander the Great). He also wrote Science Kia Haih (What is Science?) for general readers.

In 1957, he became the assistant editor for Lailo-Nihar, a social and literary magazine. In coming months, Qasim edited famed Lailo-Nihar issue "So Sala Jang Azadi 1857 Number" (Hundred years of independence war, 1857 No.). His short stories were also published in the magazine. Due to ideological differences, Qasim did not get along with his seniors.

Qasim began looking for a new job but instead turned to the spiritual. He spent a year in a cell of the Data Darbar, shrine of the Sufi saint, Ali al-Hujwiri.

In 1958, Qasim compiled the book Jansi Rasomat (Sexual Customs). In it, he describes sexual customs of ancient Greece, Rome, India, China, Japan, Indonesia, England, and Pacific Islands. The Government of Punjab banned the book, calling it obscene. Qasim went to court over the ban. In court, Urdu writers testified that the book was scholarly, and Qasim was acquitted.

In late 1958, he became assistant editor of the bimonthly research journal, Sahifa which was edited by Abid Ali Abid. He opened his own publishing house, "Shish Mahal Kitab Ghar" (Glass Palace Book House) to publish science, technology, and literature. He began publishing the monthly Ilm, which became popular in intellectual circles. Qasim also compiled Farhang Mashiat, the first dictionary of economics in Urdu.

In 1959, he wrote a novella, Pundit Jalaluddin Nehru, about the Kashmir problem. In 1960, Qasim's first anthology of short stories Dewar Pather Kee (Wall of Stones) was published by Classics, a publishing firm in Lahore. The anthology stories deal with the social, political, and economic problems of Pakistani society.

Qasim participated in the U.S. Government's Franklin Book Program.

== 1961 To 1971 ==
In 1963, Qasim's only novel, Chalay Din Bahar Kay (By gone days of spring) was published. The theme of novel is Pakistan's Society changing norms and moral values, due to modern material life coming from west. In 1964 Qasim become Editor in chief of Urdu's second Digest, Siara Digest. Due to his sound editorship and toil, Siara Digest becomes known social literacy and knowledgeable magazine.

In 1965 he joined the team of Urdu Encyclopedia as an editor. A well known publishing firm, Ferozsons was compiling and publishing this encyclopedia. Syed Sibte Hassan has edited articles of Urdu alphabet alif to ray, written by staff of Feroze sons. Now Qasim wrote articles of alphabets of seen to yay, and completed the encyclopedia. He also edited his articles. As a policy of Feroz Sons, they did not publish name of editor or writer in Urdu encyclopedia. So only Ferozsons's chairman, Dr A Wahid name was publish as Editor in chief.

In 1966, for some months, Qasim also edited the Urdu literary magazine Adab-e-Latif. That year a second anthology of his short stories was published, Qasim Kee Mendi (Qasim's Henna). (A reference to Qasim ibn Hasan, who was killed in Karbala).

In 1966, Franklin book program decided to compile and publish Urdu Jamia Encyclopedia. Its base was to be English language Columbia Encyclopedia. Now a board of editors was formed. Qasim is included in board. He worked with Justice S. A. Rahman, Prof. Hameed Ahmed Khan (V C, Punjab University), and famous Urdu writer, Maulana Ghulam Rasool Mehr. He participated in making of Index and wrote articles about History, Sociology and Anthropology. Urdu Jamia Encyclopedia was published in 1982 in two volumes.

In 1966, Pakistan Government agency for book promoting, National Book Council is looking a suitable person for his Lahore office as a head. Council's director general and legendary Urdu writer, Ibn-e-Insha want to give this job to Qasim Mahmood. But Qasim decline his offer because this is Govt job. When Insha Sahib Persistence Continue, at last he accept the job.

After becoming National Book Council's Lahore office Head, Qasim whole heartedly begin promoting book loving and development activities. He started monthly Kitab (Book) magazine. In it all articles are about new and old books and publishing activity. Then he started book fairs on very large scale in different parks. Public like these fairs and took part in large numbers. Qasim also started explanation or praising ceremonies of new books. This tendency becomes a trend setter and every writer or publisher begins to hold an explanatory ceremony of his new book. In 1967 Qasim selected precious parts of Quaid e Azam Muhammad Ali Jinnah speeches and writings and then translated them into Urdu. This anthology of Pakistan founder saying was published in the name of Quaid-e-Azam ka pagam. It is first Urdu book of this kind and instantly become famous. National Urdu dailies regularly published Quaid's sayings from this book.

In 1969, the government of Pakistan decided to write down resolutions for Lahore (Pakistan) and Delhi on marble tablets on the platform of Minar-e-Pakistan, to preserve them for generations to come. Qasim Mahmood was selected as the editor for this project. Quasim first translated the resolutions from English to Urdu, then enlisted the world-famous calligraphers Hafiz Yousaf Sadidi, Iqbal Ibn-e-Parveen Raqam, Sufi Khursheed Alam, and Muhammad Siddique Almas Raqam to carve them into the stone. This project was headed by the Pakistani writer and government civil officer Mukhtar Masood.

== 1971 to 1980 ==
In early 1971, Qasim begin publishing fortnightly Khialat (Ideas). This magazine was reserved for scientific and fine arts. Same year he also started Maloomat (knowledge). biggest general Encyclopedia of Pakistan in installments. Unfortunately Indo-Pak war ruined his plans. Qasim has collected some money with toil to start Maloomat. During war no one interested to buy this Encyclopedia, so after publishing some installments, all the money was spent. He has to close down Maloomat and Khialat.

In December 1971 he again joins Siara Digest as an editor in chief. He worked there till December 1974. During this tenure, Qasim edited proclaimed numbers of Siara Digest i.e. Quran No and Rasool No (prophet Muhammad No).

In 1975, he founded his publishing company, Maktaba Shahkar (Classics books).He published books in shape and size (23X36X8) of magazine.

Qasim also published some books in shape of Newspaper, Digest and Pocket size. Till 1980, Maktaba Shahkar published one hundred Twenty five literary and scientific books. Then due to various reasons, this revolutionary publishing house was closed. First of all, other publishers feel jealousy from Shahkar books. They also start publishing their own Jirdi books. This was their right, but they secretly planted their moles in Maktba Shahkar, so they can know which books are coming in next weeks. (Qasim published one new book every week).

In the meantime, Pakistan's political scene heated up. Riots broke out, and shop closures became the norm. In 1977, General Zia-ul-Haq imprisoned Prime Minister Zulfiqar Ali Bhutto and declared martial law in the country. Qasim had ideological differences with Bhutto, but he was also a staunch opponent of dictatorship. He fought vigorously against the generals who dismantled democracy, without any personal interest in the struggle. That’s why, when Bhutto’s daughter Benazir Bhutto made mistakes during her time as prime minister, Qasim openly criticized her. He is a man driven by ideological principles.

In 1977, Qasim started the literary weekly magazine, 'Qafla (Caravan). He changed it into a political magazine and from his sword, i.e. pen initiate furious attack on Martial law Govt. Also from Maktaba Shahkar he published imperative political and intellectual book i.e. Murda Bhutto, Zanda Bhutto (Dead Bhutto, Alive Bhutto), Qual Bhutto (Sayings of Bhutto), Bhutto's biography, Bhutto Takhtadar per (Bhutto mount the Scafolled) extra. All books are written by noted writer and translator, Sattar Tahir.

Dictators of Pak Govt can't tolerate harsh critic of this kind. So Punjab governor, Lt Gen (r) Ghulam Jilani Khan send Qasim Mahmood this message "You have angered General Ziaul Haq. Now it's better for you to migrate Karachi and keep your mouth shut." This is a soft message; side by side he also received threats that his books business will be ruined. Due to the cunning tactics of dictators, miserable national conditions and other reasons, Maktaba Shahkar collapsed. Now Qasim is forced to migrate Karachi with his family. He migrates in state of helplessness for the second time in his life. When he arrived in Karachi, Qasim have some hundred rupees in pocket, but his heart was full of courage.

From 1976 to 1977, Qasim was one of the five members of Punjab Govt's Majlis-Zaban-i-Daftri. In this position he took part in compiling 500 pages dictionary of official terms (English to Urdu). Other members of the committee were Professor Mahmood Ahmed Khan, well known Poet, Sufi Ghulam Mustafa Tabassum, famous Urdu critic, Professor Waqar Azeem, Dr. Syed Abdulla and principle Govt College, Lahore, Dr. Nazir Ahmed.

== 1981 to 1990 ==
After relocating to Karachi, Mahmood briefly edited the Urdu magazine Alami Digest and translated international fiction for Sabrang and Qaumi Digest. He also worked as a deputy editor for Nawa-i-Waqt. Resuming his mission to produce affordable literature, he established the Shahkar Book Foundation, publishing 35 low-cost paperbacks. In 1984, he published the single-volume Shahkar Islami Encyclopedia, the second-largest Urdu encyclopedia of Islam after Punjab University's Da'ira Ma'arif-i-Islamiya. An accompanying children's encyclopedia was planned but never completed.

Financial constraints forced Science Magazine to close in 1995. During the late 1980s, Mahmood edited and published the Islamic Almanac, Encyclopedia of Astronomy, and Encyclopedia of Inventions. These were intended to be part of a larger, ultimately unfinished Encyclopedia of Science. In 1988, he launched Afsana Digest (focused on short stories) and Pakistan Digest. In 1990, he established the Pakistan Open University to provide independent certificates in Pakistan Studies. That same year, he compiled Ilm-e-Quran, which featured the Arabic text alongside English and Urdu translations and scholarly commentary.

== 1991 to 2000 ==
In 1992, Mahmood launched the monthly Islami Digest and compiled two anthologies of Quranic subjects and prophetic narrations: Roha Al Quran and Roha Al Hadis. In 1997, he completed the Encyclopedia Pakistanica, the first detailed Urdu encyclopedia covering the history, culture, and geography of Pakistan. In 1998, he moved to Lahore to work with the Pakistan Academy of Letters as a book advisor, where he began editing an encyclopedia for children. Following the 1999 Pakistani coup d'état, his projects with the academy were canceled. He subsequently began serializing the Encyclopedia of Human Kind History, but the project was abandoned after eight installments.

== 2001 to 2010 ==
Mahmood compiled the two-volume Seerat al Nabi Encyclopedia between 2000 and 2004. He served as joint editor of the weekly Ahyia Khilafah and became a book advisor for the Iqbal Academy in Lahore in 2006. In 2008, the National Language Authority published his Urdu translation of Charles Darwin's On the Origin of Species (Asal Anwaa). Before his death, he began work on an Encyclopedia of Quran and conceptualized a children's encyclopedia for the Association for Academic Quality (AFAQ), which began publication posthumously in 2010.

== Death ==
Syed Qasim Mahmood died on 31 March 2010, after several months of illness. His son, Syed Asim Mahmood, is also a writer and journalist.

== Works ==
=== Short story anthologies and novels ===
- Dewar Pather Kee (Wall of Stones).
- Qasim Kee Mendi (Qasim's Henna).
- Syed Qasim Mahmood kay Afsaney (Short stories of Qasim Mahmood).
- Chalay Din Bahar Kay (By gone days of spring), Novel.
- Pundit Jalaluddin Nehru, novelette.
- Anokhi Kahaniyan.

=== Books, written or compiled ===
- Asan Mashiatv (Economic made easy).
- Mashiat kay Jadid Nazeray (New theories of Economics).
- Mubadi Mashiat (Basics of Economics).
- Usool Siasiat (Basics of Political Science).
- Cleopatra Kee Kahani (Life of Queen Cleopatra).
- Sikander Azam Kee Kahani (Life of Alexander the Great).
- Sardar Abdur Rab Nishtar.
- Science kia haih (What is Science).
- Jansi Rasomat (Sexual customs).
- Nawab Muhammad Ismaeel Khan.
- Farhang Mashiat (Dictionary of Economics).
- Quaid-e-Azam ka Pagam (Quaid e Azam Muhammad Ali Jinnah speeches and writings).
- Besiwian Sadi Aur Amriat (Twentieth Century and Dictatorship).
- Islami Duniya 2012.
- Ilm-e-Quran
- Islami Science.
- Roha Al Quran (Soul of Quran).
- Roha Al Hadis (Soul of Narrations of Prophet Muhammad).
- Paiyam-e-Romi.
- Nawab Muhammad Ismail Khan (life and achievements of the well-known luminary of Pakistan Movement )
- Piaam Iqbal Ba Nojwan Milliat (Message of Iqbal to new Generation).
- Dr M Hamidullah Ki Behtreen Tehreerain.
