= Sheikh Salahuddin (cricketer) =

Bangladeshi cricketer (1969–2013)

Personal information
- Full name: Sheikh Salahuddin Ahmed
- Born: 10 February 1969; Rajapur, Khulna, East Pakistan
- Died: 29 October 2013 (aged 44); Khulna, Bangladesh
- Batting: Right-handed
- Bowling: Right-arm offbreak

International information
- National side: Bangladesh
- ODI debut (cap 32): 16 July 1997 v Pakistan
- Last ODI: 15 October 1997 v Kenya

Career statistics
Competition	ODI	FC	LA
Matches	6	28	35
Runs scored	24	881	367
Batting average	12	19.15	14.11
100s/50s	0/0	0/7	0/0
Top score	12	96	43
Balls bowled	246	532	768
Wickets	4	5	16
Bowling average	62.25	46.80	44.56
5 wickets in innings	0	0	0
10 wickets in match	0	0	0
Best bowling	2/48	1/0	4/41
Catches/stumpings	0/–	22/–	7/–
- Source: CricInfo, 6 December 2023

Sheikh Salahuddin Ahmed (10 February 1969 – 29 October 2013) was a Bangladeshi international cricketer.

He was born in Rajapur, Khulna, and played in six One Day Internationals (ODIs) in 1997. He continued to play first-class cricket for Khulna Division until 2006.

Salahuddin died in October 2013 from a cardiac arrest. A minute of silence was held in his memory before the ODI between Bangladesh and New Zealand at Dhaka later on the same day.
