= Bhagat Phool Singh Mahila Vishwavidyalaya =

Women's University in Haryana, India

Coordinates: 29°9′22″N 76°48′17″E

- Other name: Bhagat Phool Singh Women's University
- Motto: Women Empowerment Through Education
- Type: State Govt. University
- Established: August 2006; 20 years ago
- Founder: Bhagat Phool Singh
- Religious affiliation: Arya Samaj
- Academic affiliations: UGC, NAAC, ACU
- Chancellor: Governor of Haryana
- Vice-Chancellor: Sudesh
- Students: 7,000
- Location: Khanpur Kalan, Haryana, 131305, India
- Language: English, Hindi and Sanskrit
- Website: www.bpswomenuniversity.ac.in

Bhagat Phool Singh Mahila Vishwavidyalaya, also known as Bhagat Phool Singh Women's University, is the first women's only state university of North India established by the Government of Haryana in August 2006 at Village Khanpur Kalan, of Gohana in Sonipat district.

== History ==
Bhagat Phool Singh Women's University has its origins in the ideas of the social reformer Bhagat Phool Singh. Considering educated woman as the key to social improvement, Singh established a gurukul for girls at Khanpur Kalan village in 1936. He attracted enemies for his shuddi efforts and was assassinated on 14 August 1942.

After Singh's, his daughter, Subhashini Devi, took control of the gurukul and went on to establish Girls' College (1967), Education College (1968), Ayurvedic College (1973), Mahila Polytechnic (1984), TIG Bhainswal Kalan (1999) and Law College (2003). Recognising her contribution, the Government of India conferred the Padma Shri on her in 1976.

== Departments ==
- Department of English
- Department of Foreign Languages
- Department of Laws
- Faculty of Commerce & Management
- Department of Social Work
- Department of Pharmaceutical Education & Research
- Department of Economics
- Department of History and Archaeology
- Department of Political Science
- Department of Physical Education

== Colleges & Professional Institutes ==
The constituent institutes of the university are (incomplete list):

- Bhagat Phool Singh Medical College for Women
- Bhagat Phool Singh Institute of Higher Leaning, Khanpur Kalan (established 1967)
- Bhagat Phool Singh Institute of Teacher Training and Research, Bhainswal Kalan (established 1968)
- M.S.M. Institute of Ayurveda, Khanpur Kalan (established 1973)
- Bhagat Phool Singh Institute of Polytechnic for Women, Khanpur Kalan (established 1984)
- Bhagat Phool Singh Law College for Women, Khanpur Kalan (established 2003)
- Bhagat Phool Singh UGC-Academic Staff College (established 2006)
- Bhagat Phool Singh School of Engineering & Sciences for Women (established 2008)

== Schools ==
- Bhagat Phool Singh Senior Secondary Kanya Gurukul, Khanpur Kalan (established 1936)
- Bhagat Phool Singh Campus School, Khanpur Kalan (established 2008)

== Programmes ==
Bhagat Phool Singh Women University has approximately 7,000 students. It provides education from nursery level through to doctorate, with many courses being of a vocational nature. Disciplines include engineering, law, management, commerce, economics, pharmacy, rural entrepreneurship development, hospitality and hotel administration, social work, education, applied sciences, various modern languages and ayurveda. Bhagat Phool Singh Women University is the first Indian university to Set up the UGC Area Study Centre for Indic and Asian Studies.

In order to promote research, the university runs PhD programme in various subjects.

== International Collaboration ==
The BPS Women University has signed MoUs for faculty, students and programme exchange with many international universities, these include, St. Catherine University in USA, University of Baltimore in USA, Nottingham Trent University in UK and Kwangwoon University in South Korea. The University is regularly visited by international faculty and students for academic and cultural exchange.

== Front Line Demonstration Centre ==
Since Bhagat Phool Singh Women University is situated in rural settings, it has collaborated with the farmers of neighboring villages for developing modern techniques of farming. The university with the assistance of Haryana Government’s Indo-Israel Project has set up Front Line Demonstration Centre (FLDC). The FLDC Centre is engaged in growing fruits and vegetables with modern techniques. As a result, the farmers are trained in getting maximum yield from their fields.

== See also ==
- List of institutions of higher education in Haryana
