= Rajnagar Assembly constituency =

Rajnagar Assembly constituency may refer to the following constituencies in India:

- Rajnagar, Bihar Assembly constituency
- Rajnagar, Himachal Pradesh Assembly constituency
- Rajnagar, Madhya Pradesh Assembly constituency
- Rajnagar, Tripura Assembly constituency
- Rajnagar, West Bengal Assembly constituency, former assembly constituency in West Bengal

== See also ==
- Rajanagar Assembly constituency, Odisha, India
- Rajnagar (disambiguation)
