= Bali Qutubpur =

- Nickname: Bali Chamrara
- Location in Haryana Bali Qutubpur (India)
- Coordinates: 29.201622°N 76.907129°E
- Country: India

Languages
- Time zone: UTC+5:30 (IST)
- Postal code: 131101
- ISO 3166 code: IN-HR

Bali Qutubpur or Balli Qutabpur is a village in Sonipat district, Haryana, India.
