= Sehri, Haryana =

Village in Sonipat District, India

Sehri
- Village
- Location in Haryana, India Sehri (India)
- Coordinates: 28°56′9.174″N 76°53′12.262″E
- Country: India
- State: Haryana
- District: Sonipat
- Tehsil: Kharkhoda

Government
  - Body: Gram Panchayat

Area
  - Total: 6.92 km^{2} (2.67 sq mi)

Population (2011)
  - Total: 2,819

Languages
  - Regional: Haryanvi
  - Official: Hindi, English
- Time zone: IST (UTC+5:30)
- PIN: 131402
- Phone: 0130
- Vehicle registration: HR 79
- Ethnic groups: Dahiya Jats
- Literacy: 79.44%
- Website: http://sonipat.nic.in/

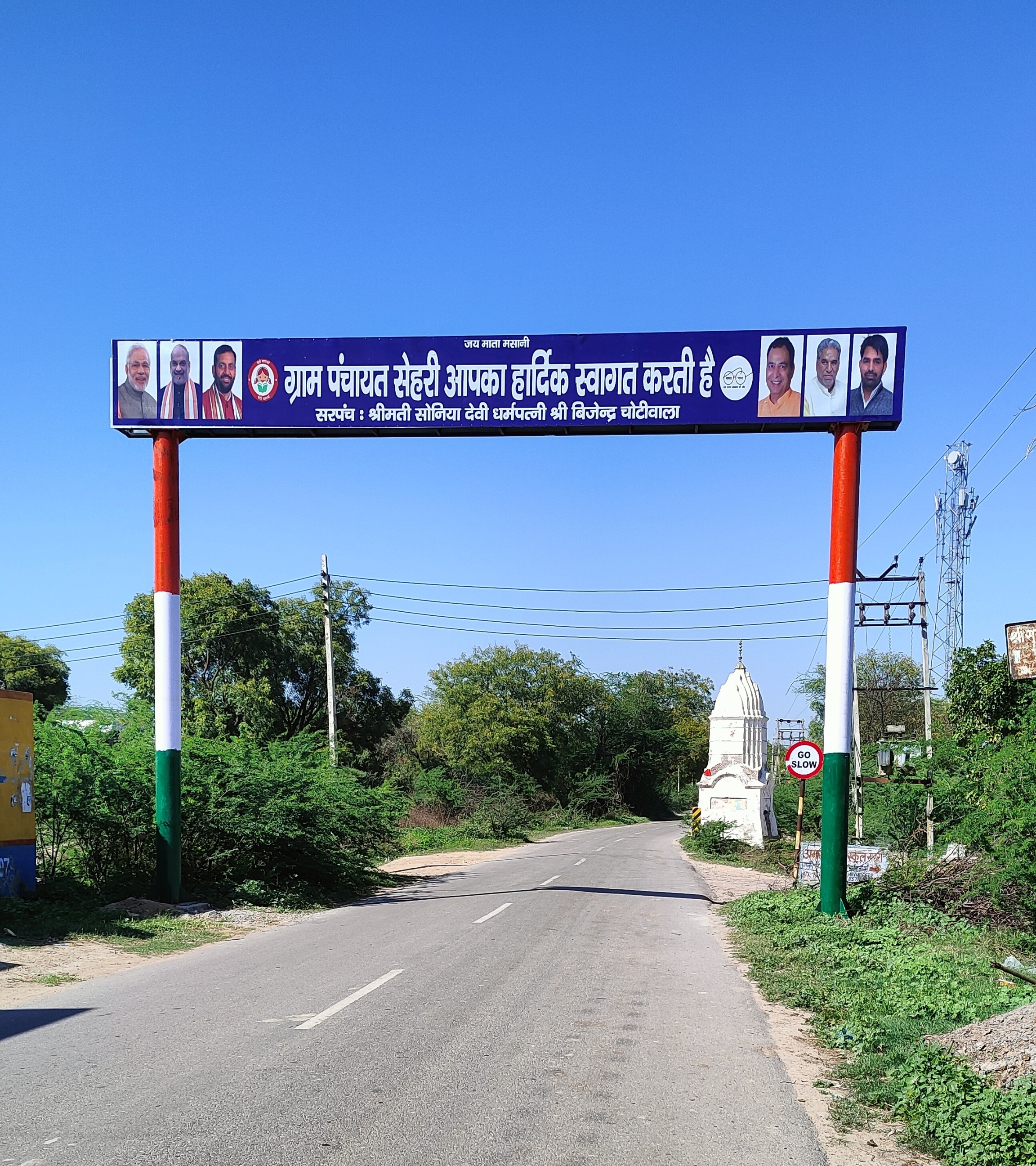
Sehri Welcome Board

Sehri is a village in Kharkhoda Tehsil, within the Sonipat district of the Indian state of Haryana.

== Geography ==
It is located near the border of Sonipat and Rohtak, about 16 km west of Sonipat city, 7 km from Kharkhoda, and roughly 20 km from the Delhi border. The state capital, Chandigarh, is approximately 228 km away.

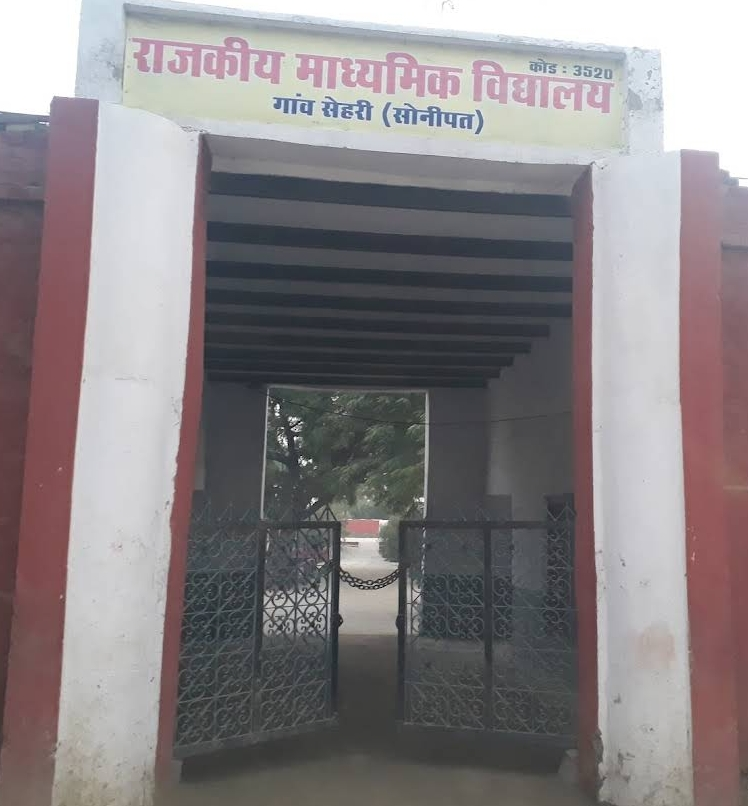
Govt Middle School Sehri

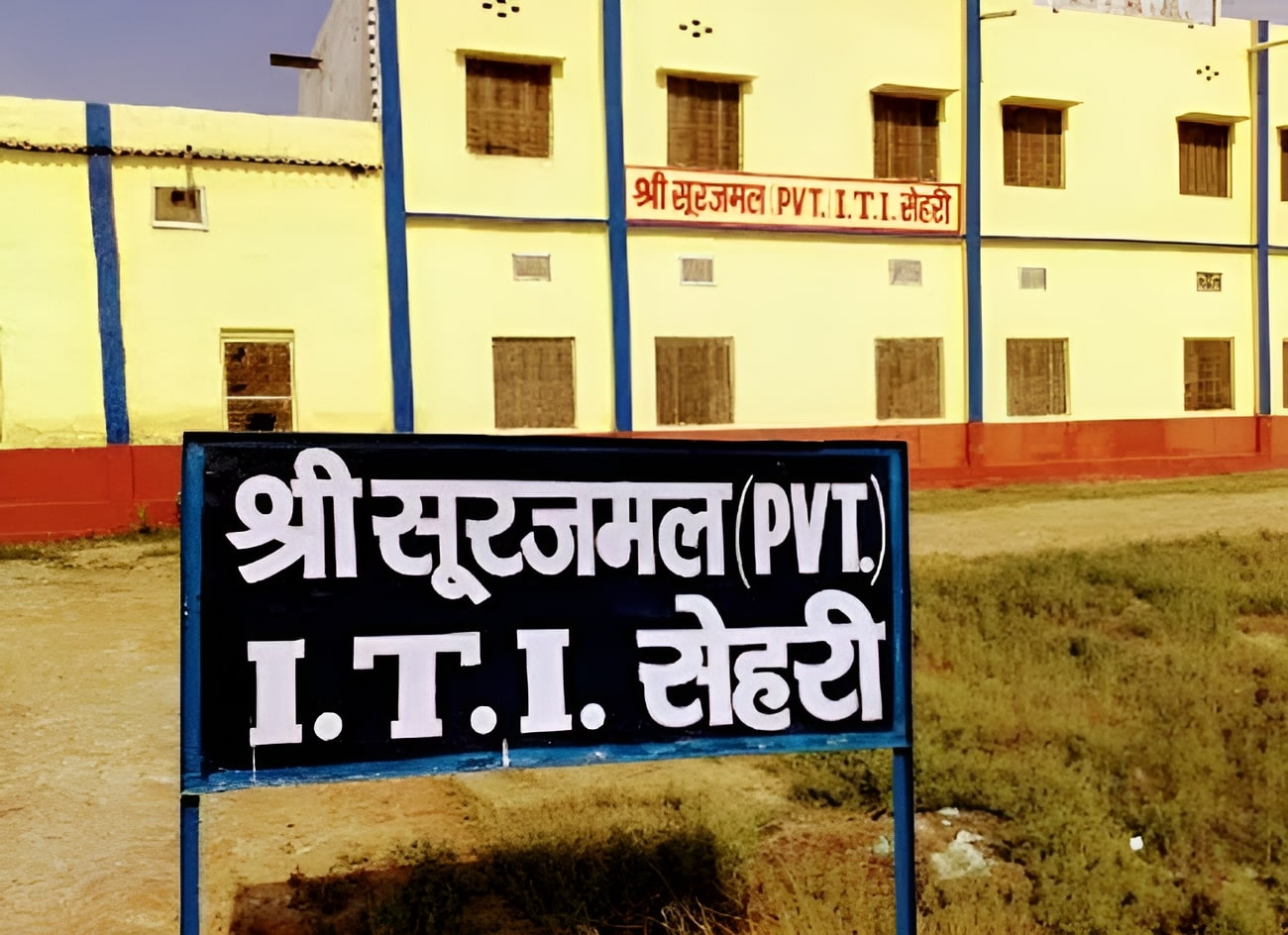
Shri Surajmal Pvt ITI

Sehri is surrounded by nearby villages, including Khanda, Chota Khanda, Sisana, Bidhlan, Nirthan, Nakloi, Nasirpur Cholka, and Silana. The village is bordered by Sonipat Tehsil to the east, Rohtak Tehsil to the west, Kharkhoda Tehsil to the south, and Gohana Tehsil to the north.

Nearby cities include Sonipat, Ganaur, Bahadurgarh, Rohtak, Gohana, and Bawana.

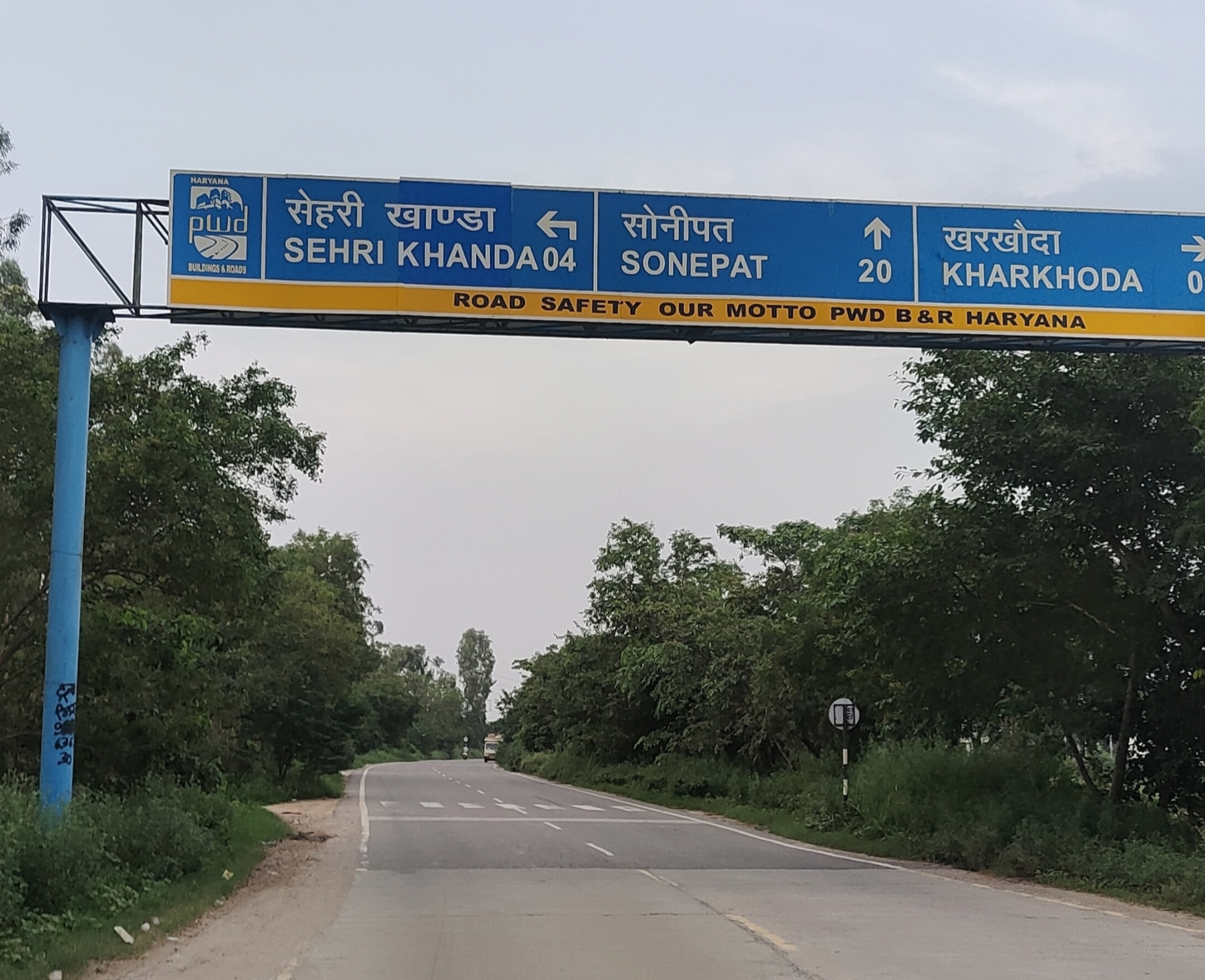
Sehri Khanda sign board

- Sehri is 8 km from Kharkhoda town. IMT Kharkhoda is 20 km away.

== Transport ==
=== Road ===
- The route to Delhi is via National Highway 344P, which connects Badwasni to Bawana and links to the Dwarka Expressway and Delhi Airport.
- National Highway 334B is 8 km away, running from Meerut to Loharu.
- KMP Expressway is 13 km away, providing access to Sonipat, Jhajjar, Gurgaon, and Palwal.
- KGP Expressway connects to Sonipat, Baghpat, Ghaziabad, Noida, Faridabad, and Palwal. KMP and KGP form a ring around Delhi.
- Delhi-Amritsar-Katra Highway is 14 km away, connecting to Jammu and Mata Vaishno Devi in Katra.

=== Rail ===
The nearest railway station is Sonipat railway station, about 18 km away. Other nearby stations include:

Sonipat Railway Station	18 km
Bahadurgarh Railway Station	27 km
Rohtak Railway Station	30 km
New Delhi Railway Station	46 km
Hazrat Nizamuddin Railway Station	53 km

=== Air ===
The nearest airport is Indira Gandhi International Airport, 47 km away. Other nearby airports:

Indira Gandhi International Airport	47 km
Safdarjung Airport	64 km
Noida International Airport	147 km

== Education ==
Multiple schools serve local students:

- Shri Surajmal (Pvt) ITI was established in 2010, the first private ITI in Sonipat district, approved by NCVT.
- Amar Sports Sr Sec School was established in 2000 and is approved by Haryana Education Board.
- Govt Middle School Sehri was established in 1954 and is managed by the Department of Education.
- Bal Kalyan Primary School Sehri was established in 1987, the first private primary school in Sehri.
- Guru Dev Bal Sanskar School & Coaching Centre.
