= Rajpuri =

Rajpuri may refer to:

- Rajpuri, Mawal, Pune district, Maharashtra, India
- Rajpuri, Raigad, Maharashtra, India

== See also ==
- Rajpur (disambiguation)
- Ratchaburi (disambiguation)
