= Kharkhoda, Haryana =

Kharkhoda
- City
- Location in Haryana, India Kharkhoda (India)
- Coordinates: 28.876681°N 76.911561°E
- Country: India
- State: Haryana
- District: Sonipat
- Founder: Pandava

Government
  - Type: Municipality
  - Body: Municipal Committee Kharkhoda

Population (2011)
  - Total: 25,051

Languages
  - Official: Haryanvi, Hindi
- Time zone: UTC+5:30 (IST)
- PIN: 131402
- ISO 3166 code: IN-HR
- Vehicle registration: HR 79
- Website: sonipat.gov.in

Kharkhoda is a city and municipal committee in Sonipat district in the Indian state of Haryana. There is a large amount of industrial and residential development in the area. Haryana State Industrial and Infrastructure Development Corporation acquired 3,200 acres of land to develop Industrial Model Township (IMT). Western Peripheral Expressway (KMP) is just 1 km and Delhi–Amritsar–Katra Expressway is 5 km away from the city. On 28 August 2022 Narendra Modi laid the foundation stone of Maruti Suzuki's new manufacturing plant in Kharkhoda.

The Mughal emperor Aurangzeb constructed a mosque in the town, which is now destroyed. The famous Pakistani writer and researcher Syed Qasim Mahmood was born here.

== Geography ==
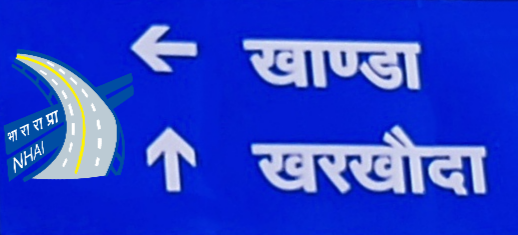
Khanda Kharkhoda

Kharkhauda is located at 28.876681°N 76.911561°E. It has an average elevation of 207 metres (682 feet).

== Demography ==
As of 2001 Indian census, Kharkhoda had a population of 18,758. As a Tehsil it contain 45 villages in Tehsil had population of 160083 in villages. Males constitute 53% of the population and females 47%. Kharkhoda has an average literacy rate of 89%, higher than the national average of 59.5%: male literacy is 71%, and female literacy is 56%. In Kharkhoda, 16% of the population is under 6 years of age. Its current population is about 21,302. Kharkhoda Land can be made subdivision after ongoing census of India. The most common language spoken in Kharkhoda is Haryanvi.

It said to derive its name from Kharak, meaning stall.

It is located 16 miles to the west from a nearby city, Rohtak. Total distance between Kharkhoda to Sonipat is 19 km. It has an elected municipal body to run the municipal administration of the town, which also contains the headquarters of the tehsil of Kharkhoda.

The town nurses a number of places of public utility of which a college, a civil veterinary hospital, a civil dispensary, a head post office, and a police station are worth mentioning. It has an important Grain Market situated near Khanda Mod.

== IMT Kharkhoda ==
IMT Kharkhoda is located on the Delhi-Haryana border adjacent to KMP Expressway (Kundli Manesar Palwal). Due to its proximity with Delhi and direct connectivity with Bahadurgarh, Gurgaon and Sonipat via KMP Expressway.

Maruti Suzuki is setting up Asia's biggest manufacturing plant in IMT Kharkhoda across 900 acres with an investment of 18000 crore (180 billion) rupees.

== Maruti Suzuki ==
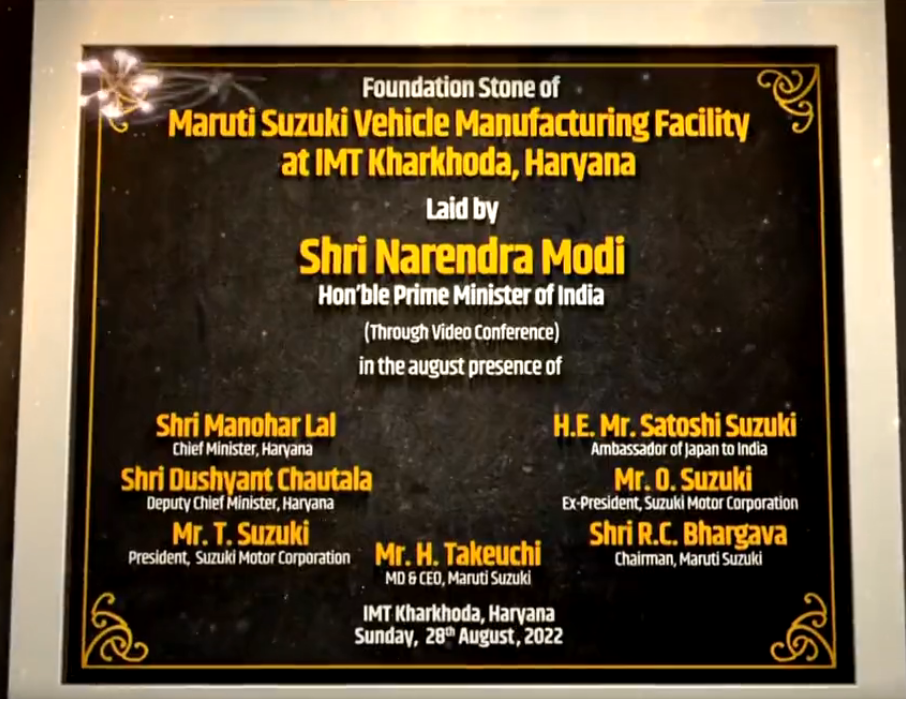
Maruti Plant

On 28 August 2022 Prime Minister of India Narendra Modi laid the foundation stone of Maruti Suzuki's new manufacturing plant in Kharkhoda. The Maruti Suzuki's Gurugram manufacturing facility will shift to new manufacturing facility in Kharkhoda, Haryana. It will be the largest automobile manufacturing plant in Asia with capacity of making 15 lakh (1.5 million) cars per year.

The Government of Haryana allotted 900 acres of HSIIDC land to Maruti Suzuki for setting up a new manufacturing plant in Kharkhoda.

== See also ==
- Khanda, Sonipat
- Sisana, Sonipat
- Battle of Sonipat
- Sehri, Haryana
