= Rajanpur (disambiguation) =

Rajanpur is a city in Punjab, Pakistan.

Rajanpur may also refer to:

- Rajanpur District, a district of Punjab (Pakistan).
- Rajanpur Tehsil, a tehsil of district Rajanpur.
- Rajanpur railway station, a railway station in Pakistan.

== See also ==
- Rajapur (disambiguation)
