= Khanpur Kalan =

- village
- Interactive map of Khanpur Kalan
- Coordinates: 29.1637934°N 76.7899135°E
- Country: India
- State: Haryana
- District: Sonipat district
- Municipality: Gohana
- Founder: Tinku Malik
- Postal code: 131305
- ISO 3166 code: IN-HR
- Website: haryana.gov.in

Khanpur Kalan is a village in Gohana tehsil of Sonipat district, in Haryana, India. B.P.S.M women's university & PGI hospitals are in Khanpur kalan.

== Demographics ==
Particulars	Total	Male	Female
Total No. of Houses	1,987	-	-
Population	12,544	5,273	7,271
Child (0-6)	1,324	710	614
Schedule Caste	2,659	1,384	1,275
Schedule Tribe	0	0	0
Literacy	80.75 %	83.41%	78.92%
Total Workers	4,345	2,794	1,551
Main Workers	2,537	0	0
Marginal Workers	1,808	726	1,082
