= Bichpari =

Coordinates: 26°53′N 75°38′E

Bichpari is a village in Gohana tehsil of the Sonipat district in the Indian state of Haryana. At the 2011 census, its population was 6,032.

The village made international headlines on 5 January 2020 when Pastor Jai Singh was dragged from his home by a large mob of Hindu extremists, thirty of whom took turns to beat him before handing him over to police. Pastor Singh was accused of paying Hindus to convert to Christianity and arrested. He remained in custody for three days and so far no action has been taken against his attackers.

Bichpari is also known for the medical treatment given by villagers for fractures, and many people used to come here from nearby villages to receive treatment. It's also known as "Ladoo wali Bichpari", because of the many temples surrounding the village. Vinay Punia who is eminent personality in law hails from this village.
