= Rajpur Assembly constituency =

Rajpur Vidhan Sabha constituency may refer to:

- Rajpur, Bihar Assembly constituency
- Rajpur, Madhya Pradesh Assembly constituency
- Rajpur, Uttarakhand Assembly constituency

== See also ==
- Rajpur (disambiguation)
