= Ratchaburi (disambiguation) =

Ratchaburi may refer to

- the town Ratchaburi, Thailand
- Ratchaburi Province, Thailand
- Ratchaburi district (Amphoe Mueang Ratchaburi)
- Diocese of Ratchaburi
- Monthon Ratchaburi
- Ratchaburi Mitr Phol F.C.

== See also ==
- Rajpuri (disambiguation)
