= Kathura =

- Village
- Location in Haryana, India Kathura (India)
- Coordinates: 29.086°N 76.582°E
- Country: India
- State: Haryana
- District: Sonipat
- Elevation: 222 m (728 ft)

Population (2011)
  - Total: 9,639

Languages
  - Official: Hindi
- Time zone: UTC+5:30 (IST)
- PIN: 131301
- Telephone code: +91, 01263
- ISO 3166 code: IN-HR
- Vehicle registration: HR 11

Kathura is a large village in Sonipat district in Haryana state, India. It is located 13.2 kilometres (8.2 mi) south east of Gohana on state highway 16-A connecting Gohana and Meham and 50.2 kilometres (31.2 mi) from Sonepat. The Headquarter of Kathura Barah and Akhil Bhartiya Narwal Khap is here.

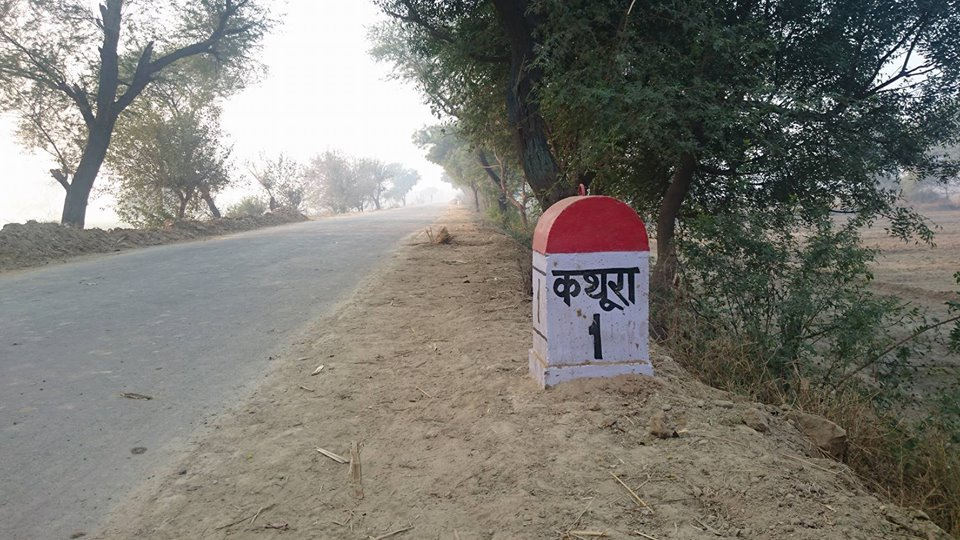
Entrance Road

.

== Geography ==
Kathura is located at 29.086°N 76.582°E. Kathura has 26.70 km2 (10.30893sq mile) land area. It is the largest village of sonipat in area. It has an average elevation of 222 meters (728.346 feet).

== History ==
Before partition, there were some Muslims also living in Kathura.

Evidences of Rajasthani times pond is also found near Govt. Se. Sec. School.

== Demographic ==
As a block it contains 17 villages which had population of 72,709. Males constitute 54.33% of the population and females 45.67%. Area of Kathura Block is 205.01 square km. Location code or village code of Kathura(89) village is 059656. As per 2019 stats, Kathura village is also a gram panchayat. Gohana is nearest town to Kathura. Villages in Kathura Block are as Follows:

1. Nizampur (1) 2. Bhawar (2) 3. Gharwal (3) 4. Rindhana (4) 5. Dhanana Aladadpur (5) 6. Chhapra (6) 7. Kahalpa (7) 8. Bhanderi (8) 9. Madina (9) 10. Ahulana (10) 11. Banwasa (13) 12. Gudha(Part) (33) 13. Thaska (34) 14. Bhainswan Khurd (83) 15. Mirzapur Kheri (87) 16. Chhichhrana (88) 17. Kathura (89)

=== Population ===
There are 1787 families residing in Kathura village has population of 9639 of which 5190 are males while 4449 are females as per Population Census 2011. In Kathura village population of children with age 0-6 is 1180 which makes up 12.24% of total population of village. Schedule Caste (SC) constitutes 13.31% of total population in Kathura village. The village Kathura currently doesn't have any Schedule Tribe (ST) population.

=== Sex Ratio ===
Average Sex Ratio of Kathura village is 857 which is lower than Haryana state average of 879. Child Sex Ratio for the Kathura as per census is 772, lower than Haryana average of 834.

=== Literacy rate ===
Kathura village has higher literacy rate compared to Haryana. In 2011, literacy rate of Kathura village was 76.59% compared to 75.55% of Haryana. In Kathura Male literacy stands at 84.90% while female literacy rate was 67.04%.

=== Notable people ===
- Pardeep Narwal - Kabaddi player
- Rajesh Narwal - Kabaddi player
- Sonu Narwal - Kabaddi player
- Surjeet Singh Narwal - Kabaddi player

== Religious places ==
- Shiv Temple (शिव मंदिर): It is believed to be the oldest temple of the village dedicated to lord Shiva.

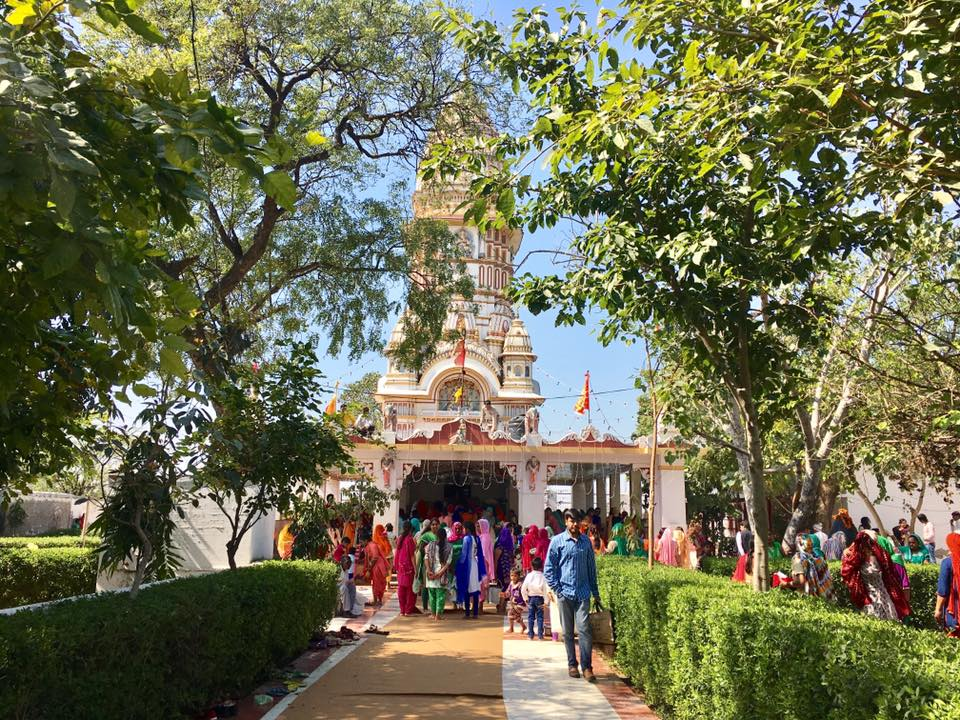
Shiv Mandir Kathura (शिव मंदिर कथूरा)

- Hanuman Temple (हनुमान मंदिर): This is a new temple build recently.
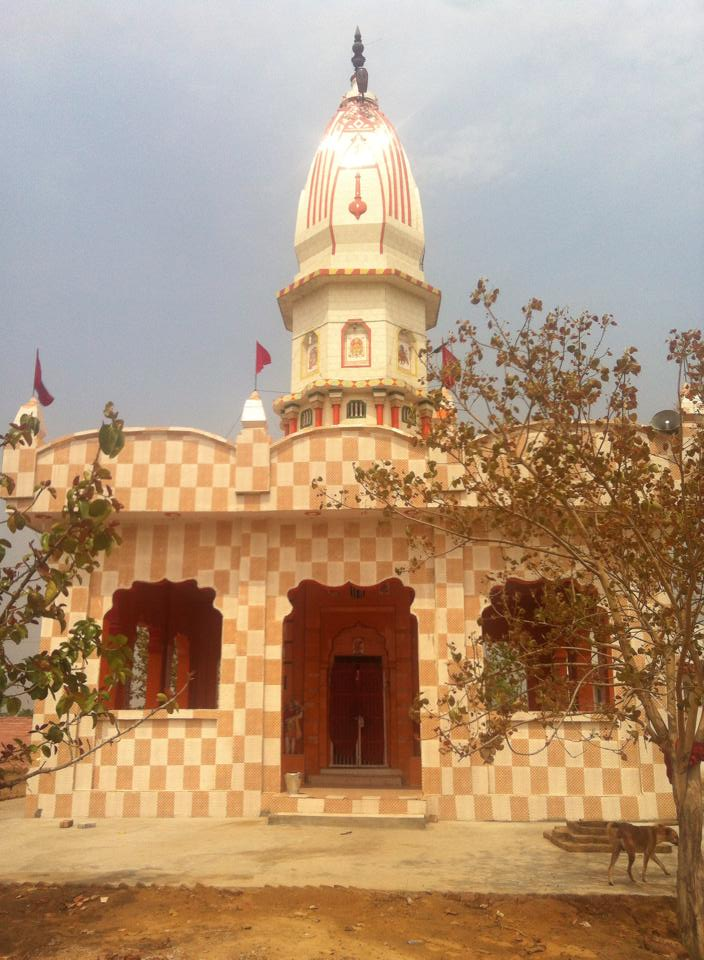
  Hanuman Mandir Kathura (हनुमान मंदिर कथूरा)
- Baba Madunath Aashram (बाबा माड़ुनाथ आश्रम):
- Baba Laxman Puri Dera (बाबा लक्ष्मण पुरी डेरा (मठ)):
- Kandi Mata Temple (कंडी माता):
- Dadi Sati Mandir (दादी सती मंदिर), Chapra road, Kathura
- Devi Mata mandir, Gora near Dhanana Road, Kathura
- Masani Mata Mandir Meham-Gohana Road, Kathura

== Education ==
Educational institutes in the village include.

- Government Senior Secondary School, Kathura
- Government Girls Senior Secondary School, Kathura
- I.T.I Kathura, Kathura
- Kids Valley Convent School, Kathura
- R P S Public School, Kathura
- G D S Public school, Kathura

== Connectivity ==
Both Public and Private Bus service are available within the village with a time interval of 15 minutes.

Nearby villages are Chiri(6.7 km), Dhanana(8.1 km), Chhapra(5.2 km), Kahlpa (3.5 km), Bhanderi(4.3 km), Katwara(6.9 km), Khidwali(10.1 km), Sanghi(7.5 km), Chhichhrana(6.1 km), Mirjapur Kheri(6.2 km)

Nearest towns are Gohana (13.2 km), Sonepat(50.2 km), Rohtak(26.9 km via Khidwali & Chmariya), Lakhan Majra(12.3 km), Meham(32.5 km) India Capital - Delhi(99 km via Gohana & Sonepat), State Capital - Chandigarh (221 km via Gohana & Panipat),

Nearest railway stations are Rukhi (11.7 km via Bhanderi and Chhicchhrana), Goahan (14.8 km), Lakahan Majra (13.4 km), Rohtak Junction (32.4 km via Lakhan majra), Sonepat Junction(50.1 km via Gohana)

Nearest airports are Indira Gandhi International Airport Delhi (101 km via Rohtak & Bhadurgarh), Chandigarh International Airport (217 km via Panipat).
