= Bayanpur =

Village in India

Bayanpur or Bayyanpur is a census town in Sonipat district, Haryana, India. It is in Sonipat.
