= Silana, Sonipat =

Silana
- Village
- Location in Haryana, India Silana (India)
- Country: India
- State: Haryana
- Region: North India
- District: Sonipat

Population
  - Total: N/A

Languages
  - Official: Hindi
- Time zone: UTC+5:30 (IST)
- PIN: 131408
- ISO 3166 code: IN-HR
- Vehicle registration: HR-79
- Website: haryana.gov.in

Silana is a village in Sonipat district of Haryana, situated 10 kilometers west from Sonipat.
