= Ganaur =

- Town
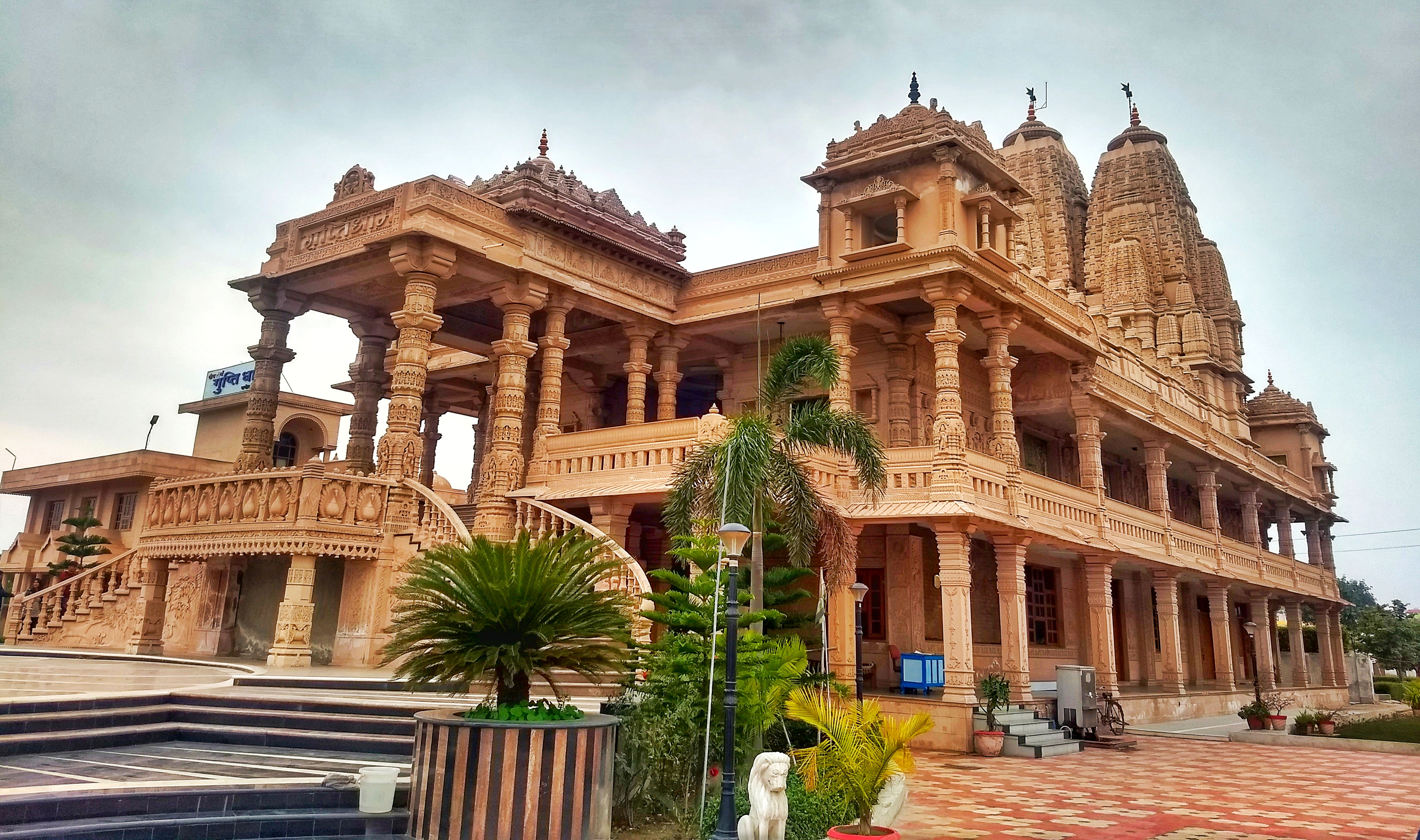
- Gupti Dham Jain temple (Ganaur), Sonipat, H.R.

- Location in Haryana, India Ganaur (India)
- Coordinates: 29.07°N 77.00°E
- Country: India
- State: Haryana
- District: Sonipat

Government
  - MLA: Nirmal Rani
- Elevation: 226 m (741 ft)

Population (2011 census)
  - Total: 35,603

Languages
  - Official: Hindi, English, Haryanvi
- Time zone: UTC+5:30 (IST)
- Postal code: 131101
- Telephone code: 0130 24
- ISO 3166 code: IN-HR
- Vehicle registration: HR-42
- Website: www.ganaur.in

Ganaur is a town located 23 km from Sonipat City in Sonipat district in the state of Haryana, India.

== History ==
Battle of Ghanaur was fought between Mughals and Sikhs at this place.

== Demographics ==
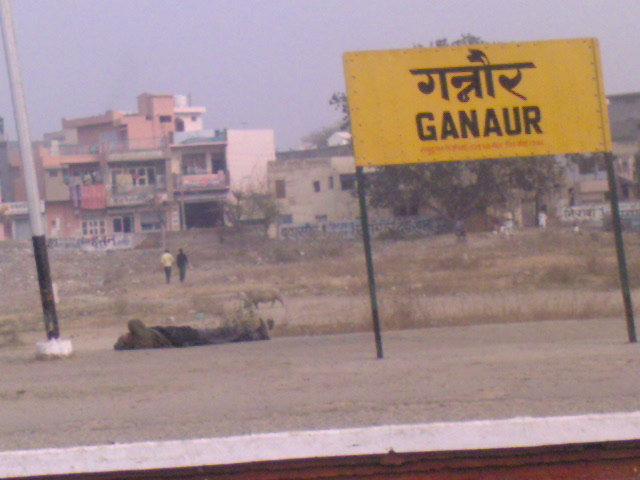
Ganaur Railway Station

As of the 2011 India census, Ganaur had a population of 35,603 with 18,991 males and 16,612 females. The population of Children with the age of 0-6 was 4459 which is 12.52% of total population of Ganaur (MC). In Ganaur Municipal Committee, the female Sex Ratio was of 875 against the state average of 879. Moreover, the child Sex Ratio in Ganaur was around 804 compared to the Haryana state average of 834. The literacy rate of Ganaur city was 83.56% higher than the state average of 75.55%. In Ganaur, Male literacy was around 90.15% while female literacy rate was 76.12%. Ganaur Municipal Committee had total administration over 6,863 houses. It has a great connectivity to the national capital through National Highway and the Railway. Every train from ganaur connect with the national capital. The craze for government jobs is paramount in the town. Most of the government employees work in the central government department located in delhi. Around 10 private libraries have been opened in the town.
