= Nirthan =

Village in Haryana, India

Nirthaan or Nirthan is a village in Sonipat district, Haryana state, India. Near it is Sehri village. It is mainly inhabited by Dahiya Jats and Bairagi (Vaishnav Brahmins).

The village is located about 15 km from the city of Sonipat.
