= Rajpur (Kathiawar) =

Human settlement in Gujarat, India

Rajpur is a town and former minor Rajput princely state on Saurashtra peninsula in Gujarat, western India.

== History ==
The Sixth Class princely state in Jhalawar prant was ruled by Jhala Rajput Chieftains. It also comprised two more villages.

In 1901 it has a population of 1,718, yielding a state revenue of 26,883 Rupees (1903–4, mostly from land), paying a 2,598 Rupees tribute to the British and the Junagadh State.
