= Rajpur, Narkatiaganj =

Rajpur
- Village
- Location within Bihar Location within India
- Coordinates: 27.108°N 84.464°E
- Country: India
- State: Bihar
- District: West Champaran district

Languages
  - Official: Hindi
- Time zone: UTC+5:30 (IST)
- ISO 3166 code: IN-BR

Rajpur is a village in Narkatiaganj block of West Champaran district in the Indian state of Bihar. The village lies approximately 8 km from Narkatiaganj town, the nearest administrative and market center. Geographical area: ~244.1 hectares (or about 2.44 km² / 603 acres).

== Demographics ==
As of the 2011 census of India, Rajpur had a population of 2757 in 522 households. Males constitute 52.7% of the population and females 47.2%. Rajpur has an average literacy rate of 38.7%, lower than the national average of 74%: male literacy is 64.38%, and female literacy is 35.61%. In Rajpur, 21.6% of the population is under 6 years of age.

Total working population: 1,090. Main Workers (worked >6 months/year): 381. Marginal Workers (worked <6 months/year): 709. Most workers are engaged in agriculture, either as landowners or laborers.
