= Raipur, Bhopal =

Raipur
- village
- Location within Madhya Pradesh Location within India
- Coordinates: 23.4236073°N 77.4185584°E
- Country: India
- State: Madhya Pradesh
- District: Bhopal
- Tehsil: Huzur
- Elevation: 484 m (1,588 ft)

Population (2011)
  - Total: 1,855
- Time zone: UTC+5:30 (IST)
- ISO 3166 code: MP-IN
- 2011 census code: 482394

Raipur is a village in the Bhopal district of Madhya Pradesh, India. It is located in the Huzur tehsil and the Phanda block.

== Demographics ==
According to the 2011 census of India, Raipur has 394 households. The effective literacy rate (i.e. the literacy rate of population excluding children aged 6 and below) is 72.74%.

Demographics (2011 Census)
	Total	Male	Female
Population	1855	977	878
Children aged below 6 years	274	142	132
Scheduled caste	807	430	377
Scheduled tribe	2	1	1
Literates	1150	701	449
Workers (all)	696	470	226
Main workers (total)	593	404	189
Main workers: Cultivators	277	176	101
Main workers: Agricultural labourers	278	198	80
Main workers: Household industry workers	6	5	1
Main workers: Other	32	25	7
Marginal workers (total)	103	66	37
Marginal workers: Cultivators	13	6	7
Marginal workers: Agricultural labourers	63	40	23
Marginal workers: Household industry workers	5	5	0
Marginal workers: Others	22	15	7
Non-workers	1159	507	652
