= Raipur, Dahanu =

Village in Maharashtra

Raipur
- village
- Location in Maharashtra, India Raipur (India)
- Coordinates: 20.060406°N 73.0228173°E
- Country: India
- State: Maharashtra
- District: Palghar
- Taluka: Dahanu
- Elevation: 120 m (390 ft)

Population (2011)
  - Total: 2,782
- Time zone: UTC+5:30 (IST)
- 2011 census code: 551637

Raipur is a village in the Palghar district of Maharashtra, India. It is located in the Dahanu taluka.

== Demographics ==
According to the 2011 census of India, Raipur has 570 households. The effective literacy rate (i.e. the literacy rate of population excluding children aged 6 and below) is 29.87%.

Demographics (2011 Census)
	Total	Male	Female
Population	2782	1310	1472
Children aged below 6 years	586	293	293
Scheduled caste	1	1	0
Scheduled tribe	2773	1305	1468
Literates	656	426	230
Workers (all)	1701	802	899
Main workers (total)	508	399	109
Main workers: Cultivators	265	185	80
Main workers: Agricultural labourers	218	191	27
Main workers: Household industry workers	0	0	0
Main workers: Other	25	23	2
Marginal workers (total)	1193	403	790
Marginal workers: Cultivators	395	168	227
Marginal workers: Agricultural labourers	773	221	552
Marginal workers: Household industry workers	3	1	2
Marginal workers: Others	22	13	9
Non-workers	1081	508	573
