= Rajpur, Sonipat =

Village in Haryana, India

Rajpur is a village located in the Sonipat tehsil of the Sonipat district in the Indian state of Haryana. Situated within the National Capital Region (NCR), it is located approximately 40 kilometers north of the national capital, New Delhi. As per the Census of India, the village sustains a notable population and is primarily an agricultural settlement. It holds regional historical significance due to its strong cultural and demographic ties to the prominent Rajput community of the district.

== Community ==
Rajpur village has a significant presence of the Rajput community, specifically those belonging to the Chauhan clan. Historically, the Chauhans have played an important role in the local administration, landholdings, and social structures of the area.

=== Origins and the 36 Villages ===
The Chauhans of Rajpur are part of a larger, historically significant network of 36 Chauhan Rajput villages spread across the Sonipat district. The community traces its historical roots to the city of Gohana, which serves as the historical "capital" or main center for the clan in the region. Gohana was founded by a Chauhan Rajput, Rana Tej Singh.

The 36 Chauhan villages are geographically divided into two main clusters. A large concentration of 12 villages is situated around the historical capital of Gohana. The remaining 24 villages form a continuous belt stretching from the Delhi border—including prominent Chauhan Rajput villages like Kundli—up to Murthal, with Murthal acting as the final village in this geographical line. Rajpur belongs to this regional network.

Throughout the Sonipat district, Chauhan Rajputs predominantly use the title "Rana" as their surname, a tradition proudly upheld in villages from Kundli to Rajpur. This practice stems from their Gohana origins and signifies their noble lineage and historical status as headmen within the broader Chauhan clan.

=== Zaildari System and Main Villages ===
While Rajpur is an integral part of this community network, the most prominent Chauhan villages in the immediate vicinity are Murthal and Jakhauli. Historically, these main villages governed the surrounding areas through the Zaildar system. Zaildars acted as regional feudal lords who were responsible for managing vast tracts of agricultural land, collecting revenue, and maintaining law and order.

The historical and demographic prominence of these main villages was established by their powerful Zaildars:

- Murthal is the final village in the 24-village belt and is recognized today as the largest Rajput-dominated village in the Sonipat district, boasting a Chauhan Rajput population of approximately 18,000. It was founded and historically governed by Zaildar Rana Malhan Singh Chauhan.
- Jakhauli was another major regional center of power, historically under the leadership of Zaildar Rana Harphul Singh.

The administrative influence of these main villages and their Zaildars historically extended over the surrounding settlements, shaping the social and administrative framework of smaller villages like Rajpur.

Rajpur is a village in the Sonipat district of Haryana state, India.
