= Rajnagar, Bhiwandi =

Village in Maharashtra

Rajnagar
- village
- Location in Maharashtra, India Rajnagar (India)
- Coordinates: 19.2703003°N 73.0943887°E
- Country: India
- State: Maharashtra
- District: Thane
- Taluka: Bhiwandi
- Elevation: 10 m (33 ft)

Population (2011)
  - Total: 831
- Time zone: UTC+5:30 (IST)
- 2011 census code: 552655

Rajnagar is a village in the Thane district of Maharashtra, India. It is located in the Bhiwandi taluka.

== Demographics ==
According to the 2011 census of India, Rajnagar has 170 households. The effective literacy rate (i.e. the literacy rate of population excluding children aged 6 and below) is 86.99%.

Demographics (2011 Census)
	Total	Male	Female
Population	831	474	357
Children aged below 6 years	116	65	51
Scheduled caste	5	3	2
Scheduled tribe	13	8	5
Literates	622	384	238
Workers (all)	334	283	51
Main workers (total)	233	214	19
Main workers: Cultivators	28	25	3
Main workers: Agricultural labourers	15	15	0
Main workers: Household industry workers	12	10	2
Main workers: Other	178	164	14
Marginal workers (total)	101	69	32
Marginal workers: Cultivators	46	29	17
Marginal workers: Agricultural labourers	11	7	4
Marginal workers: Household industry workers	7	3	4
Marginal workers: Others	37	30	7
Non-workers	497	191	306
