= Rajpur, Varanasi =

Coordinates: 25.4913°N 82.8903°E

Rajpur is a village situated in Pindra tehsil of Varanasi district of the Indian state of Uttar Pradesh. In the 2011 census its population was 797. The Lal Bahadur Shastri International Airport is near Rajpur. There are three sub villages in Rajpur mauza namely Naipura, Korauta and Rajpur itself . There is a Government school, a Nursery school and an Intermediate school named Shree Tapaswi Mahraj Inter College Rajpur Varansai. There is a Mandi named 'Rajpur Korra mandi'. This area is rich in cropping.
