= Farmana, Sonipat =

Farmana is one of the villages in Sonipat district in the Indian state of Haryana. The nearest town is Kharkhoda and it falls under Kharkhoda police station. There is a farmers procurement centre in Farmana village.
