= Rajpur, Sonbhadra =

Village in Uttar Pradesh, India

Rajpur is a village in Sonbhadra district in the Indian state of Uttar Pradesh. Its population in the 2011 census was 4,424.
