= Rajapur, Garwara =

Rajapur is a village in Garwara, Uttar Pradesh, India.
