= Raipura, Jabalpur =

Raipura
- Village
- Country: India
- State: Madhya Pradesh
- District: Jabalpur

Population (2011)[1]
  - Total: 507
- Time zone: UTC+5:30 (Indian Standard Time)

Raipura is a village in Jabalpur district, Madhya Pradesh, India. As of the 2011 Census of India, it had a population of 507 across 123 households.
