= Rajapur, Khulna =

Coordinates: 22.8249°N 89.5714°E

Rajapur is a village in Rupsha Upazila beside the city of Khulna Town of the Division of Khulna in Bangladesh. Rajapur is on the bank of Bhairab River which crosses the city of Khulna by South Khulna and North Khulna. Rajapur has two big industries which created a lot of jobs for the citizens of greater Rupsha Upazila, the Rupsha Salt Industries and the Popular Jute Mills Limited.

The Post Office Code of Rajapur, Belphulia, Bangladesh is 9242.

== See also ==
- Rupsha River
- List of villages in Bangladesh
