= Rajnagar, Himachal Pradesh Assembly constituency =

Defunct assembly constituency in India

Coordinates: 32.623°N 76.063°E

Rajnagar
- Former constituency for the Himachal Pradesh Legislative Assembly

Constituency details
- Country: India
- Region: North India
- State: Himachal Pradesh
- District: Chamba
- Lok Sabha constituency: Kangra
- Established: 1967
- Abolished: 2008
- Total electors: 64,660
- Reservation: SC

Rajnagar was one of the 68 constituencies in the Himachal Pradesh Legislative Assembly of Himachal Pradesh a northern state of India. Rajnagar was also part of Kangra Lok Sabha constituency. It was made defunct by the Delimitation of Parliamentary and Assembly Constituencies Order, 2008.

== Members of the Legislative Assembly ==
| Year | Member | Party |
|---|---|---|
| 1967 | Vidhya Dhar | Indian National Congress |
| 1972 | Vidhya Dhar | Indian National Congress |
| 1977 | Mohan Lal | Janata Party |
| 1982 | Mohan Lal | Bharatiya Janata Party |
| 1985 | Nand Kumar Chauhan | Indian National Congress |
| 1990 | Mohan Lal | Bharatiya Janata Party |
| 1993 | Vidhya Dhar | Indian National Congress |
| 1998 | Mohan Lal | Bharatiya Janata Party |
| 2003 | Surinder Bhardwaj | Indian National Congress |
| 2007 | Surinder Bhardwaj | Indian National Congress |

== Election results ==
=== Assembly Election 2007 ===
2007 Himachal Pradesh Legislative Assembly election: Rajnagar
| Party | Candidate | Votes | % | ±% |
|---|---|---|---|---|
| INC | Surinder Bhardwaj | 23,596 | 47.73% | ▼0.70 |
| BJP | Mohan Lal | 21,774 | 44.04% | ▲3.40 |
| Independent | Ram Dass | 2,368 | 4.79% | New |
| LJP | Karam Singh | 849 | 1.72% | ▼0.60 |
| BSP | Dinesh Kumar | 702 | 1.42% | New |
| Margin of victory | | 1,822 | 3.69% | ▼4.10 |
| Turnout | | 49,440 | 76.21% | ▲0.38 |
| Registered electors | | 64,870 | | ▲15.57 |
| INC hold | | Swing | ▼0.70 | |

=== Assembly Election 2003 ===
2003 Himachal Pradesh Legislative Assembly election: Rajnagar
| Party | Candidate | Votes | % | ±% |
|---|---|---|---|---|
| INC | Surinder Bhardwaj | 20,613 | 48.43% | ▲12.33 |
| BJP | Mohan Lal | 17,301 | 40.65% | ▼4.88 |
| HVC | Nand Kumar | 2,186 | 5.14% | ▲3.48 |
| Independent | Ajay Kumar | 1,478 | 3.47% | New |
| LJP | Karam Singh | 987 | 2.32% | New |
| Margin of victory | | 3,312 | 7.78% | ▼1.64 |
| Turnout | | 42,565 | 75.93% | ▲6.86 |
| Registered electors | | 56,130 | | ▲9.70 |
| INC gain from BJP | | Swing | ▲2.90 | |

=== Assembly Election 1998 ===
1998 Himachal Pradesh Legislative Assembly election: Rajnagar
| Party | Candidate | Votes | % | ±% |
|---|---|---|---|---|
| BJP | Mohan Lal | 16,064 | 45.52% | ▲2.67 |
| INC | Vidhya Dhar | 12,739 | 36.10% | ▼21.05 |
| Independent | Nand Kumar | 4,987 | 14.13% | New |
| CPI | Sukh Dev | 795 | 2.25% | New |
| HVC | Hem Raj | 585 | 1.66% | New |
| Margin of victory | | 3,325 | 9.42% | ▼4.87 |
| Turnout | | 35,288 | 69.97% | ▲0.77 |
| Registered electors | | 51,165 | | ▲7.43 |
| BJP gain from INC | | Swing | ▼11.63 | |

=== Assembly Election 1993 ===
1993 Himachal Pradesh Legislative Assembly election: Rajnagar
| Party | Candidate | Votes | % | ±% |
|---|---|---|---|---|
| INC | Vidhya Dhar | 18,563 | 57.15% | ▲22.43 |
| BJP | Mohan Lal | 13,919 | 42.85% | ▼19.42 |
| Margin of victory | | 4,644 | 14.30% | ▼13.26 |
| Turnout | | 32,482 | 68.65% | ▲6.77 |
| Registered electors | | 47,626 | | ▲6.38 |
| INC gain from BJP | | Swing | | |

=== Assembly Election 1990 ===
1990 Himachal Pradesh Legislative Assembly election: Rajnagar
| Party | Candidate | Votes | % | ±% |
|---|---|---|---|---|
| BJP | Mohan Lal | 17,127 | 62.27% | ▲17.69 |
| INC | Nand Kumar | 9,549 | 34.72% | ▼19.26 |
| CPI | Sukh Dev | 657 | 2.39% | New |
| Margin of victory | | 7,578 | 27.55% | ▲18.16 |
| Turnout | | 27,504 | 61.79% | ▼3.64 |
| Registered electors | | 44,768 | | ▲20.72 |
| BJP gain from INC | | Swing | | |

=== Assembly Election 1985 ===
1985 Himachal Pradesh Legislative Assembly election: Rajnagar
| Party | Candidate | Votes | % | ±% |
|---|---|---|---|---|
| INC | Nand Kumar Chauhan | 13,026 | 53.98% | ▲4.82 |
| BJP | Mohan Lal | 10,759 | 44.58% | ▼4.75 |
| Independent | Kartar Singh Yadav | 232 | 0.96% | New |
| Margin of victory | | 2,267 | 9.39% | ▲9.22 |
| Turnout | | 24,132 | 65.53% | ▼2.27 |
| Registered electors | | 37,084 | | ▲3.30 |
| INC gain from BJP | | Swing | | |

=== Assembly Election 1982 ===
1982 Himachal Pradesh Legislative Assembly election: Rajnagar
| Party | Candidate | Votes | % | ±% |
|---|---|---|---|---|
| BJP | Mohan Lal | 11,927 | 49.34% | New |
| INC | Vidhya Dhar | 11,885 | 49.16% | ▲18.64 |
| JP | Chuni Lal | 256 | 1.06% | ▼67.77 |
| Margin of victory | | 42 | 0.17% | ▼38.14 |
| Turnout | | 24,175 | 68.31% | ▲20.83 |
| Registered electors | | 35,898 | | ▲16.70 |
| BJP gain from JP | | Swing | | |

=== Assembly Election 1977 ===
1977 Himachal Pradesh Legislative Assembly election: Rajnagar
| Party | Candidate | Votes | % | ±% |
|---|---|---|---|---|
| JP | Mohan Lal | 9,848 | 68.83% | New |
| INC | Vidhya Dhar | 4,367 | 30.52% | ▼50.69 |
| Independent | Chuni Lal | 92 | 0.64% | New |
| Margin of victory | | 5,481 | 38.31% | ▼27.50 |
| Turnout | | 14,307 | 47.01% | ▲12.64 |
| Registered electors | | 30,762 | | ▼0.98 |
| JP gain from INC | | Swing | | |

=== Assembly Election 1972 ===
1972 Himachal Pradesh Legislative Assembly election: Rajnagar
| Party | Candidate | Votes | % | ±% |
|---|---|---|---|---|
| INC | Vidhya Dhar | 8,545 | 81.22% | ▲19.52 |
| ABJS | Amar Nath | 1,621 | 15.41% | New |
| INC(O) | Chuni Lal | 355 | 3.37% | New |
| Margin of victory | | 6,924 | 65.81% | ▲42.40 |
| Turnout | | 10,521 | 34.71% | ▲9.38 |
| Registered electors | | 31,065 | | ▲13.28 |
| INC hold | | Swing | | |

=== Assembly Election 1967 ===
1967 Himachal Pradesh Legislative Assembly election: Rajnagar
| Party | Candidate | Votes | % | ±% |
|---|---|---|---|---|
| INC | Vidhya Dhar | 4,144 | 61.70% | New |
| SWA | Chuni Lal | 2,572 | 38.30% | New |
| Margin of victory | | 1,572 | 23.41% | |
| Turnout | | 6,716 | 25.15% | |
| Registered electors | | 27,422 | | |
| INC win (new seat) | | | | |

== See also ==
- List of constituencies of the Himachal Pradesh Legislative Assembly
- Chamba district
