= Sonipat district =

- District of Haryana
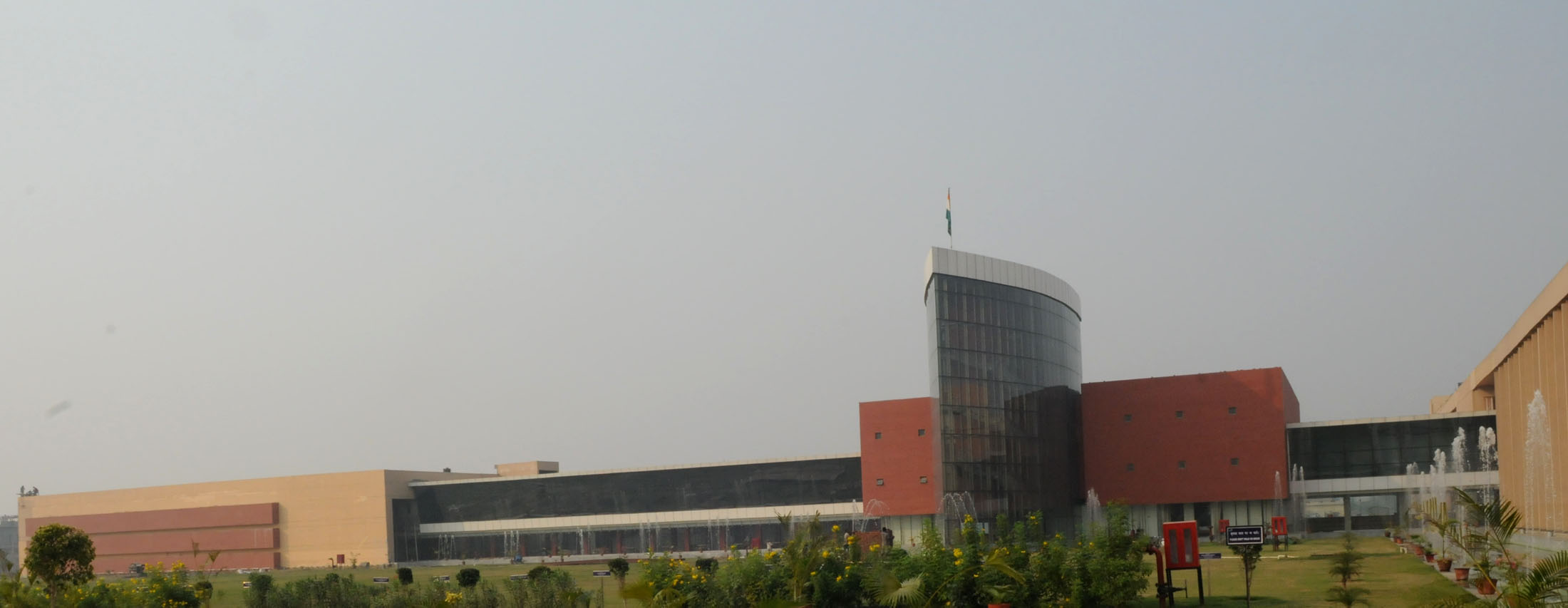
- National Institute of Food Technology Entrepreneurship and Management in Sonipat

- Location in Haryana
- Coordinates (Sonipat): 29°N 77°E
- Country: India
- State: Haryana
- Division: Rohtak
- Headquarters: Sonipat
- Tehsils: 1. Sonipat, 2. Kharkhauda, 3. Gohana, 4. Gannaur

Area
  - Total: 2,260 km^{2} (870 sq mi)

Population (2011)
  - Total: 1,450,001
  - Density: 642/km^{2} (1,660/sq mi)
  - Urban: 321,432

Demographics
  - Literacy: 73.71
  - Sex ratio: 937/1000
- Time zone: UTC+05:30 (IST)
- Major highways: NH-1 NH-71 Eastern Peripheral Expressway, Western Peripheral Expressway National Highway 334B (India) National Highway 44 (India)
- Average annual precipitation: 624 mm
- Lok Sabha constituencies: Sonipat
- Vidhan Sabha constituencies: Ganaur, Rai, Kharkhauda, Sonipat, Gohana, Baroda
- Website: sonipat.nic.in

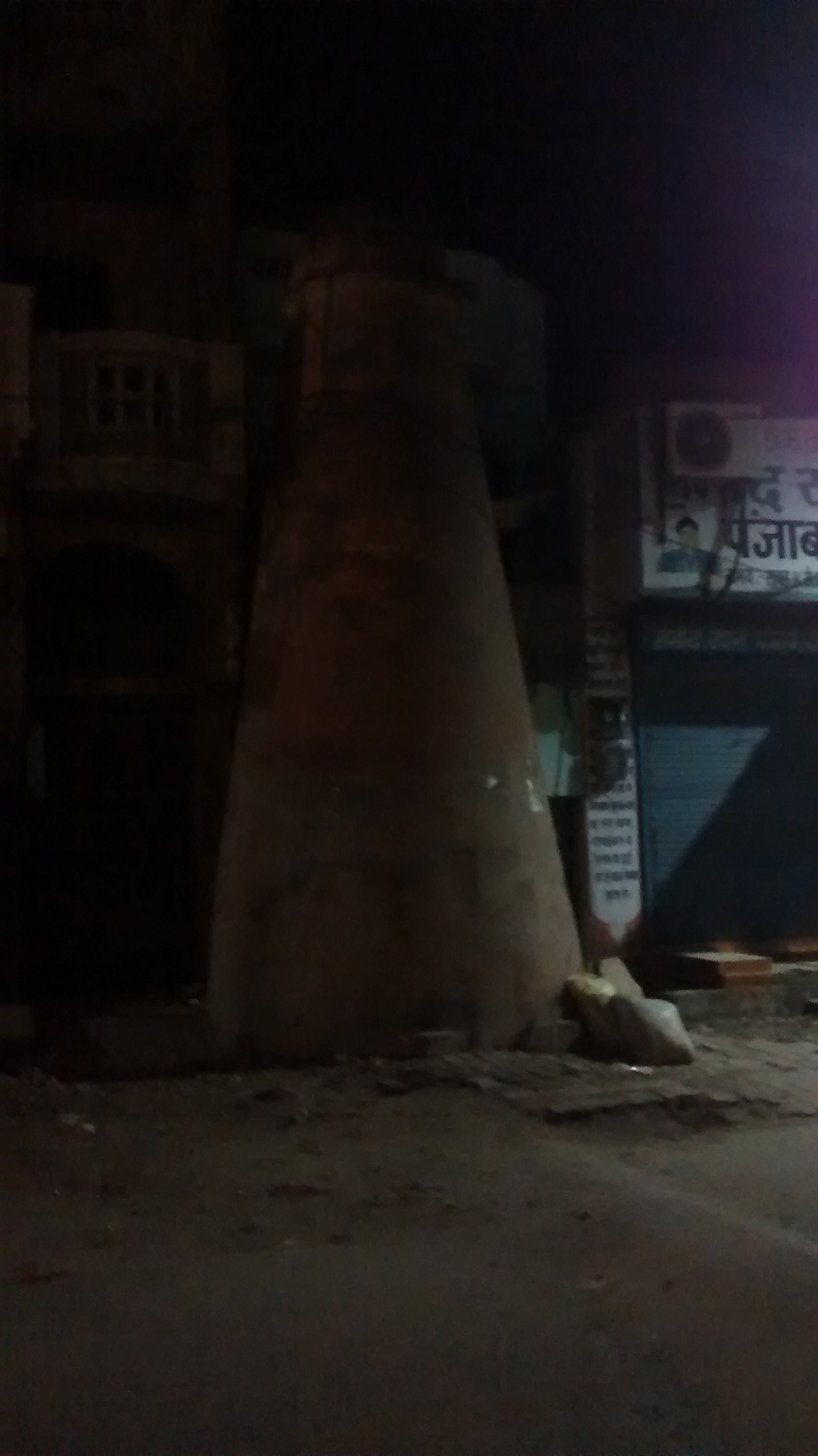
Kos Minar at Sonepat bus stand along Grand Trunk Road in Haryana

Sonipat district is one of the 23 districts of Haryana state in northern India. Sonipat town is the district headquarters. It is a part of National Capital Region. It is bordered by Delhi, Panipat, Rohtak, Jind, Jhajjar and Baghpat (Uttar Pradesh).

The district borders union territory of Delhi in south, Panipat District in the north, Jind District in the north-west, Uttar Pradesh state in the east with the Yamuna River acting as a border and Rohtak District in the west.

== Background ==
=== Etymology ===
The district is named after its administrative headquarters, Sonipat. Sonipat was earlier known as Sonprastha, which later became Swarnprastha (Golden City), which is derived from two Sanskrit words, Svarna (Gold) and Prastha (Place). Over a period of time, the classical name Swarnprastha's pronunciation degraded into Svarnpat, and then to its current form, Sonipat. The earliest reference of this city comes in the historical book of Mahabharata, and at that time, it was one of the five villages demanded by the Pandavas in lieu of the kingdom of Hastinapur.

=== History ===
==== Battle of Sonipat ====
The one and only battle fought in Sonipat was Battle of Sonipat. Dahiya Jats of Khanda, Sonipat village witnessed the Battle of Sonipat against Mughals and won the battle under the leadership of Banda Singh Bahadur.

==== Formation of district ====
This district was carved out of the erstwhile Rohtak district on 22 December 1972, with Sonipat as its headquarters.

== Geography ==
Broadly speaking, the entire district is a part of the Punjab plain, but the area is not level in some parts. Over most of the district, the soil is fine loam of rich colour. However, some areas have sandy soil and others Kallar. The plain has a gradual slope to the south and east. The district may be roughly divided into three regions: The Khadar, the upland plain and the sandy region.

=== The Khadar ===
Along the River Yamuna which is a narrow flood plain ranging from 2 to 4 miles in width and is formed by the river along its course. The Khader plain is 20 to 30 ft. lower adjoining upland plain. The soil is fine clay loam left by the receding floods of the Yamuna. Farmers in the Khadar area cultivate rice and sugar cane. Recently, the farmers have started planting Banana, Pappaya and other fruits trees in this area.

=== The upland plain ===
It consists of Sonipat tehsil lying to the west of the Khadar, and is the most extensive of the three regions: The Upland Plain is covered with old alluvium, which if properly irrigated, is highly productive. There is extensive Farming of crops, oil seeds, horticultural plants, vegetables and flowers in this region. The ridges in Gohana tehsil represent the northernmost extension of the Aravallis.

=== The sandy region ===
A much smaller part of the district is covered with soil consisting of sand or sandy loam. Parts of this region have high PH values leading Kallor land.

== Administration ==
The district comprises three sub-divisions: Ganaur, Sonipat, and Gohana.

They are further divided in four tehsils: Ganaur, Sonipat, Kharkhoda and Gohana. The tehsils of Kharkhoda and Sonipat fall under jurisdiction of Sonipat sub division, while tehsils of Ganaur and Gohana fall under the jurisdiction of their respective sub divisions. These are further divided into seven blocks: Ganaur, Sonipat, Rai, Kharkhoda, Gohana, Kathura and Mundlana.

The district comprises 343 villages, out of which 15 are uninhabited.

There are six Vidhan Sabha constituencies in this district, namely, Ganaur, Rai, Kharkhauda, Sonipat, Gohana and Baroda. All of these are part of Sonipat Lok Sabha constituency. The other three Vidhan Sabha constituencies which are part of Sonipat Lok Sabha constituency, namely, Julana, Safidon and Jind are in Jind District.

The district comprises a lone municipal corporation, Sonipat, and 3 municipal committees: Ganaur, Gohana and Kharkhoda.

=== Villages ===
The following villages are under the Sonipat district.

- Bidhlan
- Aghwanpur
- Atail
- Bai
- Bajana Kalan
- Bajana Khurd
- Balli Qutabpur
- Baraut
- Bari
- Begah
- Bhagan
- Bhakharpur
- Bhanwar
- Bharet
- Bhogipur
- Bhora Rasulpur
- Bhuri
- Bulandpur
- Chandauli
- Chirsami
- Dabarpur
- Datauli
- Ganaur
- Garhi Kesri
- Ghasoli
- Giaspur
- Gumar
- Jalalabad
- Kailana
- Kherigujar
- Kheritaga
- Khizarpur Ahir
- Khubru
- Lalheri
- Larsoli
- Machhrauli
- Manak Majra
- Miana
- Mohammadpur Majra
- Nayabans
- Pabnera
- Panchi Gujran
- Panchi Jatan
- Patti Barahmnan
- Pipli Khera
- Pogthala
- Purkhas Dhiran
- Purkhas Rathi
- Rajlu
- Rajpur
- Ramnagar
- Rasulpur
- Sanpera
- Sardhana
- Shahpur Taga
- Shamashpur
- Udesipur
- Umedgarh
- Sheikhupura
- Siha Khera(Ravi bhardwaj's village)
- Teha
- Teori
- Zafarpur
- Ahulana
- Gohana
- Nagar
- Barota
- Garhi Sharai Namdar khan
- Garhi Unale Khan
- Lath
- Jauli
- Bidhal
- Tihar
- Bhainswal Kalan Mithan
- Bhaniswal Kalan Bawala
- Giwana
- Aanwali
- Kheri Damkan
- Rabhra
- Moi Hooda
- Puthi
- Bali Barmanan
- Sikanderpur Majra
- Baroda Thuthan
- Khanpur Khurd
- Thaske
- Kathura
- Kahalpa
- Banwasa
- Bhanderi
- Ahulana
- Dhanana
- Rindhana
- Katwal
- kohla
- Madina
- Rukhi
- Chhichhrana
- Chhapra
- Bilbilan
- Riwara
- Jasrana
- Niat
- Mirzapur Kheri
- Anandpur
- Ashrafpur Matindu
- Barona
- Bidhlan
- Chhanauli
- Farmana
- Ferozepur Bangar
- Garhi Sisana
- Gopalpur
- Gorar
- Jataula
- Jharaut
- Jharauti
- Jhinjauli
- Kanwail
- Karhouli
- Katlupur
- Khanda
- Khanda Almaan
- Chhota Khanda
- Naya Khanda
- Kharkhoda
- Kheri Dahiya
- Kundal
- Mandaura
- Mandauri
- Muzzam Nagar
- Nakloi
- Nasirpur Cholka
- Nirthan
- Nizampur Khurd
- Nizampur Majra
- Pahladpur
- Pai
- Pipli
- Rampur
- Ridhad
- Rohna
- Sahoti
- Saidpur
- Sehri
- Silana
- Sisana
- Thana Kalan
- Thana Khurd
- Turakpur
- Ziaudinpur
- Pharmana
- Ridhau
- Abbaspur
- Abdulpur
- Ahmadpur
- Asadpur
- Badshahpur Machchhri
- Bagru
- Bainyapur
- Bakhtawarpur
- Bandepur
- Barauli
- Barwasni
- Basaudi
- Bhadana
- Bhadi
- Bhatana Jafrabad
- Bhatgaon Dungran
- Bhatgoan Malian
- Bhowapur
- Bindhrauli
- Bohla
- Chatiya Aoliya
- Chatiya Deva
- Chhatehra bahadurpur
- Chitana
- Dewru
- Dhaturi
- Dhikki
- Dipalpur
- Dodwa
- Dubheta
- Fatehpur
- Fazilpur
- Garh shahjanpur
- Garhi Bakhtawarpur
- Garhi bala
- Garhi Brahmnan
- Guhna
- Halalpur
- Harsana Kalan
- Harsana khurd
- Hasamabad
- Hasanpur
- Hullaheri
- Hushanyarpur tiharkalan
- Jagdishpur
- Jainpur
- Jaji
- Jamalpur kalan
- Jamalpur khurd
- Jawahri
- Joshi Chauhan
- Kabirpur
- Juan
- Kakroi
- Kalupur
- Kamaspur
- Kami
- karewri
- Khijarpur Jat Majra
- Kilohard
- Kishora
- Kurar Ibrahimpur
- Ladpur
- Lahrara
- Liwan
- Luhari tibba
- Machchhraula
- Mahipur
- Mahla Majra
- Mehlana
- Mahra
- Majri
- Malikpur
- Mahendipur
- Mimarpur
- Mohamdabad
- Mohana
- Moi
- Mukimpur
- Murshadpur
- Murthal
- Nahra
- Nahri
- Naina tatarpur
- Nandnaur
- Nangal Khurd
- Nasirpur Bangar
- Nasirpur Khadar
- Pinana
- Raipur
- Rathdhana
- Rehmana
- Rewli
- Rohat
- Rolad latifpur
- Salarpur Majra
- Salimpur trali
- Salimsar majra
- Sandal Kalan
- Sandal Khurd
- Shadipur
- Shahpur Turk
- Shahzadpur
- Sitawali
- Sonepat Patti Musalman
- Sonepat Patti Jatan
- Sultanpur
- Tajpur
- Tajpur tihar khurd
- Tharu
- Tharya
- Tikaula
- Uldepur
- Bhainswan khurd
- Gudha
- Mahmudpur
- Kailana Talaka Mahudpur
- Siwanka
- Chhatera
- Ahmadpur Majra
- Gangesar
- Matand
- Jagsi
- Gangana
- Rana Kheri
- Bichpari
- Khandri
- Butana Kundu
- Butana Khetlan
- Issapur Kheri
- Nuran Khera
- Nizampur
- Bhawar
- Gharwal
- Baroda Mor
- Sonipat
- Dahisra
- kundli
- Jakhauli
- Sewli
- Khatkar
- Basantpur
- Badmalik
- Nathupur
- Akbarpur Barota
- Jajal
- Khewra
- Palri khurd
- Garh Mirakpur
- Rai
- Jatheri
- Hansapur
- Jat joshi
- Manoli
- Nangal Kalan
- Atena
- Palri Kalan
- Palra
- Bazidpur Saboli
- Safiabad Pana Paposian
- Janti Kalan
- Janti khurd
- Sersa
- Munirpur
- Pabsara
- Jhundpur
- Asawarpur
- Orangabad
- Patla
- Bahalgarh
- Liwaspur
- Firozpur Khadar
- Pritam pura
- Badkhalsa
- Rasoi
- Kheri Manajat
- Khurampur
- Bharia
- Bakipur
- Safiabad Kheri Manajat
- Khanpur Kalan
- Kakana Bhadri
- Mundlana No. 1
- Mundlana No. 2
- Bhadoti Taluka Mudlana
- Sarsadh
- Busana
- Bhadoti khas
- Bhadoti Taluka Busana
- Jawahra
- Dhurana
- Saragtjal
- Kasanda
- Kasandi
- Shamri Sisan
- Shamri Lochab Bairan
- Chirana
- Shamri Buran
- Gamri
- Kailana Khas
- Lehrara
- Garhi Bindhrauli

== Education ==
The district is one of the major education hubs in India. Apart from a number of schools and colleges, the district is home to many universities. Deenbandhu Chhotu Ram University of Science and Technology in Murthal was founded in 1987, Bhagat Phool Singh Mahila Vishwavidyalaya in Sonipat was founded in 2006 and O. P. Jindal Global University near Rathdhana was founded in 2009. Recently in 2012, National Institute of Food Technology Entrepreneurship and Management, NIFTEM, a world class institute was founded in Kundli which falls near Delhi border, SRM University, Delhi-NCR, Sonepat in Rajiv Gandhi Education City, Sonipat near Delhi was founded in 2013.Haryna sports University is also would be constructed in the district as per the Act of state legislative Assembly also one of the country's premier Union of India sports institute namely SAI center is also located in sonipat.

== Hospital ==
Chiranjiv Hospital Bahalgarh is a healthcare facility located on Main G.T. Road near the Government School in Bahalgarh, Sonipat district, Haryana. run by Dr. Swati.

The hospital provides healthcare services in the fields of obstetrics and gynaecology, including pregnancy care, childbirth and post-delivery care. Publicly listed services also include normal vaginal delivery, caesarean delivery, uro-gynaecology and surgical procedures.

Located on the Grand Trunk Road, the hospital serves patients from Bahalgarh and surrounding areas of Sonipat district. Its location provides access to healthcare services for residents of the surrounding urban and rural communities.

The services publicly associated with Chiranjiv Hospital include obstetric and gynaecological care, pregnancy-related services, childbirth, post-delivery care, uro-gynaecology and surgical treatment.

Chiranjiv Hospital is situated on Main G.T. Road, near the Government School, Bahalgarh, Sonipat, Haryana 131021. The location is recorded in Haryana government listings.

== Transport ==
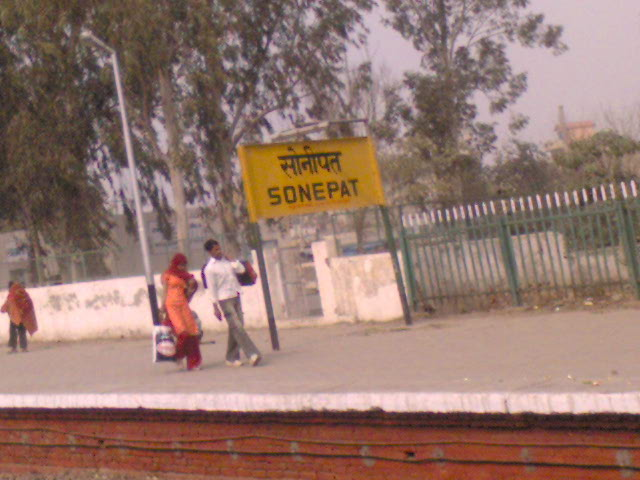
Sonepat (Sonipat junction) Railway Station platform

Sonipat Junction Railway Station is located on the Northern Railways' Ambala-Panipat-Delhi rail route. It lies on one of the most busiest railway line in North India that is Delhi - Chandigarh.. A number of passengers and express trains daily passes through it like Shatabadi Express, Shaan-e-Punjab, Malwa Express, Muri Express, Saryu Yamuna Express, Himalayan Queen, Sachkhand Express, Paschim Express, Kalka Mail, Jammu Mail, Unchahar Express, Amritsar Express, Jhelum Express, Tata Jat Express, Jan Shatabi, Shahid Express etc. In total, 64+ trains available from Sonipat daily. National Highway 1 and National Highway 71A, NH 334B, NH 44, Western Peripheral Expressway and Eastern Peripheral Expressway pass through this district. Government of India plans to make first Bus Port in the pattern of Airport in Sonipat.

== Demographics ==
Historical population
| Year | Pop. | ±% p.a. |
|---|---|---|
| 1901 | 330,208 | — |
| 1911 | 284,856 | −1.47% |
| 1921 | 307,091 | +0.75% |
| 1931 | 320,840 | +0.44% |
| 1941 | 379,798 | +1.70% |
| 1951 | 432,282 | +1.30% |
| 1961 | 546,873 | +2.38% |
| 1971 | 679,834 | +2.20% |
| 1981 | 839,298 | +2.13% |
| 1991 | 1,045,158 | +2.22% |
| 2001 | 1,279,175 | +2.04% |
| 2011 | 1,450,001 | +1.26% |

According to the 2011 census Sonipat district has a population of 1,450,001, roughly equal to the nation of Gabon or the US state of Hawaii. This gives it a ranking of 338th in India (out of a total of 640). The district has a population density of 697 inhabitants per square kilometre (1,810/sq mi) . Its population growth rate over the decade 2001-2011 was 15.71%. Sonipat has a sex ratio of 853 females for every 1000 males, and a literacy rate of 80.8%. Scheduled Castes make up 18.62% of the population.

=== Religion ===
Religion in Sonipat district (2011)
| Religion | Percent |
| Hinduism | 95.87% |
| Islam | 3.11% |
| Other or not stated | 1.02% |

Religion in Sonipat District (Note: 1941 figures are for Sonipat Tehsil, which roughly matches present-day district borders. District was incorporated to take into account population increases during the post-independence era, which has resulted in various bifurcations of districts and tehsils across the historic Punjab Province region.)
| Religion | Population (1941) | Percentage (1941) |
|---|---|---|
| Hinduism (Note: 1941 census: Including Ad-Dharmis) | 176,709 | 81.81% |
| Islam | 35,275 | 16.33% |
| Christianity | 724 | 0.34% |
| Sikhism | 613 | 0.28% |
| Others (Note: Including Jainism, Buddhism, Zoroastrianism, Judaism, or not stated) | 2,687 | 1.24% |
| Total Population | 216,008 | 100% |

=== Languages ===
Languages of Sonipat district (2011)
1. Haryanvi (66.9%)
2. Hindi (30.1%)
3. Punjabi (1.24%)
4. Others (1.72%)

At the time of the 2011 Census of India, 66.89% of the population in the district spoke Haryanvi, 30.15% Hindi and 1.24% Punjabi as their first language.
