= List of people from Haryana =

This is a list of notable people from Haryana.

== Academics ==
- Dr. Sarup Singh, born in Sanghi, Rohtak
- Prof. K. C. Yadav, born in Rewari
- Dr. Brijendra Kumar Rao, born in Rewari
- Dr. Bhim Singh Dahiya, born in Silana
- J.B. Chaudhary
- Prof. J. P. Yadav, born in Chhinnmasta
- Prof. Ramesh Kumar Yadava, born in Rewari

== Arts, entertainment and films ==
=== Actors and models ===
- Jaideep Ahlawat, born in Kharkara, Rohtak
- Mohit Ahlawat, actor, born in Panipat
- Baje Bhagat, classical singer
- Manish Joshi Bismil, theatre actor, director, puppeteer and magician born in Hisar
- Juhi Chawla, actress born in Ambala
- Manushi Chhillar, model and beauty pageant titleholder from Sonipat
- Parineeti Chopra, born in Ambala
- Parul Gulati, actress born in Rohtak
- Randeep Hooda, born in Jaseya, Rohtak
- Jagat Jakhar, a Haryanvi film actor
- Satish Kaushik, born in Dhanoda Mahendergarh
- Dayachand Mayna, actor, songwriter, poet and singer from Mayna (Rohtak)
- Om Puri, born in Ambala
- Srishti Rana beauty queen born in Faridabad
- Rajkummar Rao, born in Gurgaon
- Usha Sharma, actress
- Yashpal Sharma (actor), born in Hisar
- Mallika Sherawat, actress born in Rohtak
- Yash Tonk, born in Sonipat
- Vikramjeet Virk, actor from Karnal

=== Comedians ===
- Elvish Yadav, Bigboss Winner From Gurugram
- Sunil Grover, born in Mandi Dabwali, Sirsa
- Sohit Soni, actor from Faridabad
- CarryMinati, YouTuber born in Faridabad

=== Arts and architecture ===
- Nek Chand Saini

=== Authors ===
- Pandit Lakhmi Chand
- Dayachand Mayna
- Preeti Singh
- Murari Lal Sharma (Neeras)
- Ram Swarup

=== Singers and composers ===
- Zohrabai Ambalewali, classical singer and playback singer, born in Ambala
- Baje Bhagat, songwriter, poet and singer from Sisana, Sonipat
- Pandit Lakhmi Chand
- Pandit Jasraj, classical singer, born in Hisar
- Dayachand Mayna, songwriter, poet and singer from Mayna (Rohtak)
- Sonu Nigam, born in Faridabad
- Jatin Pandit, Bollywood composer
- Lalit Pandit, Bollywood composer
- Ghulam Farid Sabri Qawwal, member of the Sabri Brothers/Qawwali group, born in Kalyana, Rohtak, Haryana/East Punjab
- Sanjay Saini Sanju movie writer
- Gajendra Verma composer and playback singer from Sirsa

=== Poets ===
- Sardar Anjum
- Baje Bhagat, born in Sisana, Sonipat
- Alhar Bikaneri, born in Bikaner, Haryana
- Lakhmi Chand, born in Sonipat, Haryana
- Hari Singh Dilbar, born in Faisalabad
- Altaf Hussain Hali, born in Panipat
- Uday Bhanu Hans, born in Daira Din Panah
- Nasir Kazmi, born in Ambala
- Dayachand Mayna, born in Mayna, Rohtak
- Ghulam Bhik Nairang, born in Ambala
- Murari Lal Sharma (Neeras), born in Koka, Rohtak
- Saghar Siddiqui, born in Ambala
- Samartha Vashishtha, born in Nabha
- Sajida Zaidi, born in Panipat
- Kashmiri Lal Zakir

== Journalist ==
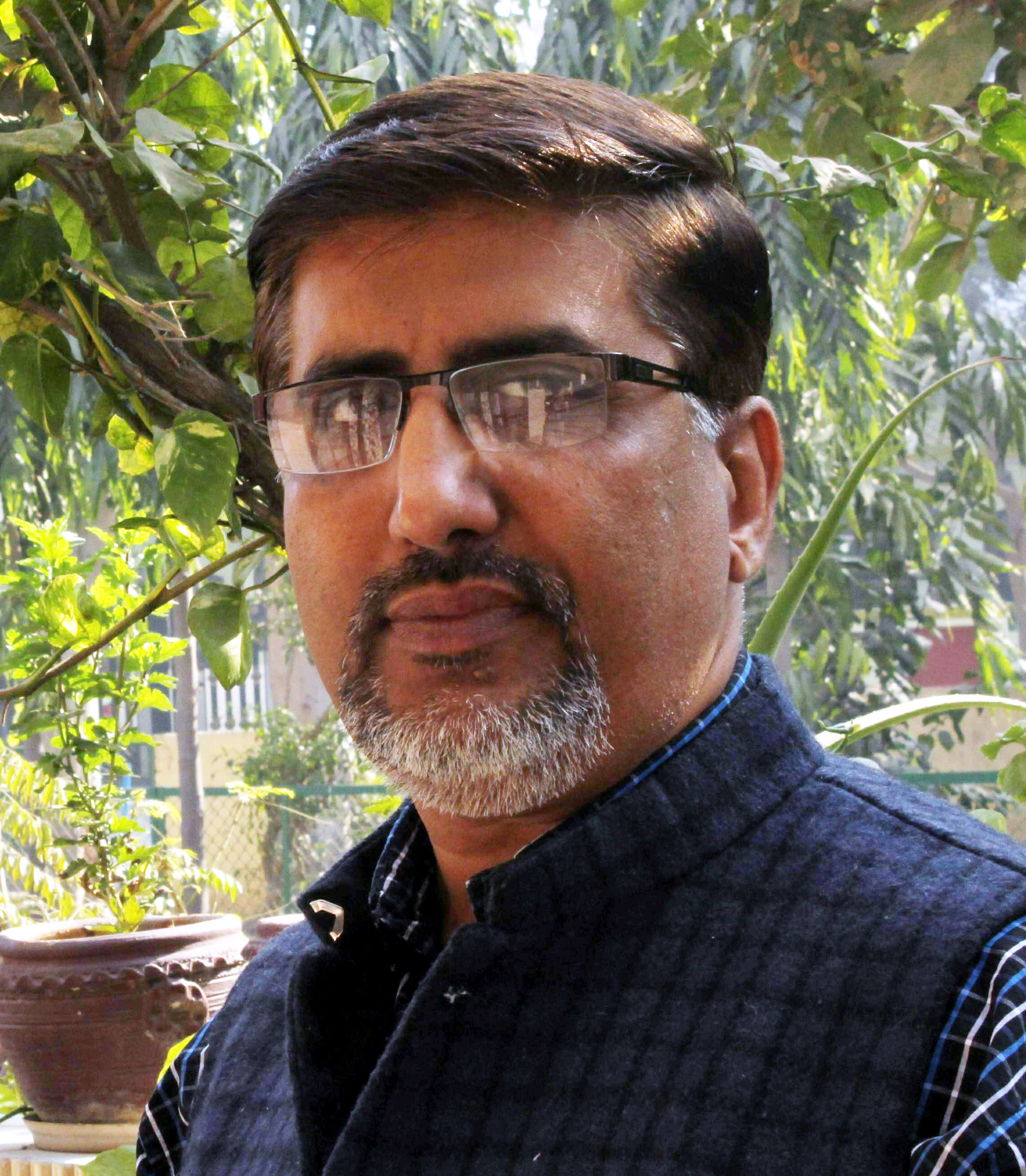
Shekhar Gurera, Editorial Cartoonist

=== Editorial cartoonist ===
- Shekhar Gurera, born in Moga

=== Television journalists ===
- Rohit Sardana, born in Kurukshetra

== Business ==
- Subhash Chandra, founder Zee TV, chairman ESSEL Group
- Sameer Gehlaut
- Naveen Jindal, former member of parliament, chairman Jindal Steel and Power Limited
- O.P. Jindal, former member of parliament, Haryana Power Minister, Founder — Jindal. From Hissar
- Savitri Jindal, former minister, Haryana Government and chairman OP Jindal Group
- Sajjan Jindal, from Hisar
- Kartikeya Sharma, MP of Rajya Sabha, entrepreneur and media baron
- Baba Ramdev, Patanjali Ayurved Ltd. Born in Mahendragarh

== Rulers ==
- Adityavardhana, King of Thanesar
- Anangpal Tomar, King of Tomara dynasty
- Harsha, King of North India
- Hemu Bhargav, King of Delhi
- Prabhakaravardhana, King of North India
- Rajyavardhana, King of North India
- Rao Tula Ram, King of Rewari
- Rao Gopal Dev, King of Rewari

== Military ==
- Captain Umang Bhardwaj, born in Gurgaon
- General Deepak Kapoor, born Patna
- Major General Rao Farman Ali Khan, born in Rohtak, Haryana/East Punjab
- Subedar Richhpal Ram, born in Barda, Mahendragarh
- Captain Deepak Sharma, born in Rohtak
- Major Mohit Sharma, born in Rohtak
- Lt. Colonel Dharam Singh, born in Badesara, Bhiwani, Haryana
- Lance Naik Hari Singh, born in Badanpur, Jind district, Haryana
- Lt. Colonel Hoshiar Singh, born in Sisana, Sonipat
- General VK Singh, born in Pune
- General Dalbir Singh Suhag, born in Bishan, Jhajjar, Haryana
- Commodore Babru Bhan Yadav, Maha Vir Chakra, born in Bharawas
- Petty Officer Chiman Singh Yadav, Maha Vir Chakra, born in Gurgaon
- Brigadier Rai Singh Yadav, Maha Vir Chakra, born in Kosli
- Subedar Sujjan Singh Yadav, born in Kanina Khas
- Hon. Captain Umrao Singh Yadav, born in Palra, Gurgaon
- Lt. General J.B.S. Yadava, born in Mahendragarh

== Politicians ==
- Chaudhary Khurshid Ahmed, born in Dhulawat, Taoru
- Avtar Singh Bhadana, born in Faridabad
- H. R. Bhardwaj, born in Rohtak district
- Om Prakash Chautala, born in Chautala, Sirsa
- Om Prakash Dhankar, born in Dhakla, Jhajjar
- Sagar Ram Gupta, from Bhiwani, Haryana
- Bhupinder Singh Hooda, born in Rohtak
- Tayyab Husain, born in Nuh, Haryana
- Rao Sikandar Iqbal, from Kalanaur, Haryana/East Punjab
- Babu Mool Chand Jain, born in Sikanderpur Majra, Gohana
- Dinesh Kaushik, born in Fatehpur, Kaithal
- Arvind Kejriwal, from Bhiwani, Haryana
- Chaudhary Rahim Khan, from Faridabad, Haryana
- Nawabzada Liaquat Ali Khan, born in Karnal, Haryana/East Punjab
- Rana Muhammad Iqbal Khan, born in Karnal, Haryana/East Punjab
- Rana Phool Muhammad Khan, born in Karnal, Haryana/East Punjab
- Rao Hashim Khan, born in Balyali, Bawani Khera, Bhiwani district, Haryana/East Punjab
- Rao Muhammad Afzal Khan born in Kalanaur, Rohtak District, Haryana/East Punjab
- Bansi Lal, born in Golagarh, Bhiwani district
- Bhajan Lal, born in Kotwali, Bahawalpur district
- Devi Lal, born in Teja Khera
- Gajraj Bahadur Nagar, born in Bhowapur, Faridabad
- B. D. Sharma, born in Beri, Jhajjar
- Abhimanyu Sindhu, born in Khanda Kheri
- Rao Birender Singh, born in Rewari
- Rao Inderjit Singh, born in Rewari
- Nityanand Swami, born in Narnaul
- Sushma Swaraj, born in Ambala
- Ashok Tanwar, born in Haryana
- Lt. General D.P. Vats, from Haryana
- Captain Ajay Singh Yadav, born in Saharanwas

== Revolutionaries and freedom fighters ==
- Deshbandhu Gupta, born in Panipat
- Dharam Singh Hayatpur
- Ranbir Singh Hooda, born in Sanghi, Rohtak
- Babu Mool Chand Jain, born in SikanderPur Majra, Gohana, Sonepat
- Sir Chhotu Ram, born in Garhi Sampla
- Rao Tula Ram, born in Rewari
- Seth Chhaju Ram, born in Bawani Khera
- Pandit Neki Ram Sharma, born in Kelanga, Bhiwani
- Nihal Singh Takshak, born in Bhagwi

== Sports ==
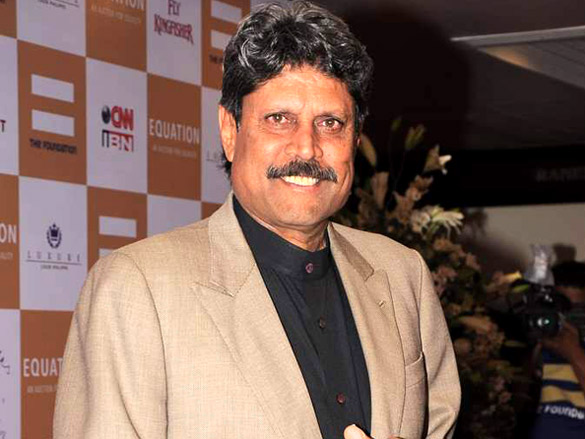
Kapil Dev, cricketer

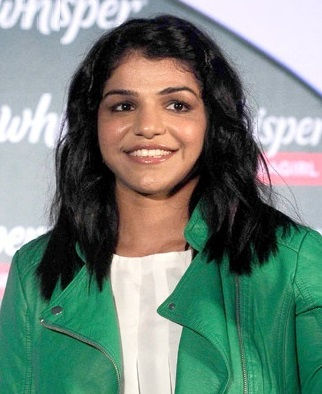
Sakshi Malik, wrestler

=== Athletics ===
- Neeraj Chopra, javelin

=== Badminton ===
- Saina Nehwal

=== Boxing ===
- Dinesh Kumar, born in Bhiwani
- Jagdish Singh, born in Bhiwani
- Manoj Kumar, born in Rajound, Kaithal district
- Vijender Singh, born in Bhiwani
- Vikas Krishan Yadav, born in Singhwa Khas, Hisar district
- Manish Kaushik, born in Bhiwani
- Preeti Pawar
- Jaismine Lamboria
- Sakshi Chaudhary
- Priya Ghanghas
- Sachin Siwach
- Ankush Panghal

=== Cricket ===
- Manvinder Bisla, from Faridabad
- Yuzvendra Chahal
- Kapil Dev, born in Haryana
- Amit Mishra
- Ashish Nehra
- Joginder Rao, born in Gurgaon
- Ajay Ratra, born in Faridabad
- Nitin Saini
- Virender Sehwag, born in Jhajjar District
- Chetan Sharma
- Joginder Sharma, born in Rohtak
- Mohit Sharma
- Parvinder Singh
- Barinder Sran
- Shafali Verma, born in Rohtak

=== Hockey ===
- Suman Bala, born in Shahbad Markanda
- Sita Gussain
- Jasjeet Kaur Handa
- Surinder, born in Shahbad
- Mamta Kharab, born in Rohtak
- Savita Punia, born in Jodhkan village of Sirsa district, Haryana
- Sandeep Singh
- Sardara Singh
- Pritam Rani Siwach, born in Jharsa, Gurgaon

=== Kabaddi ===
- Sunil Dabas, born Mohammadpur Majra, Jhajjar district
- Anup Kumar born in Palra, Gurugram district
- Ramesh Kumar

=== Mountaineering ===
- Santosh Yadav, born in Joniyawas, Rewari

=== Martial art ===
- Rahul Kumar Yadav – Karate
- Aruna Tanwar – Para-taekwondo
- Poonam Khatri – Wushu
- Narender Grewal – Wushu
- Divya Tewar – Judo

=== Volleyball ===
- Dalel Singh Ror, born in Amin, Kurukshetra
- Balwant Singh (volleyball), born in Kaul, Kaithal district

=== Wrestling ===
- Ravi Kumar Dahiya, Sonipat district
- Yogeshwar Dutt
- Suman Kundu, born in Kalwa, Jind
- Gurvinder Singh Malhotra, Yamunanagar district
- Sakshi Malik
- Geeta Phogat, born in Bhiwani
- Bajrang Punia, Jhajjar district
- Chandgi Ram, born in Sisai, Hisar district
- Lila Ram, born in Mandola, Bhiwani district
- Shilpi Sheoran
- Virender Singh, Jhajjar District

=== Shooting ===
- Manu Bhaker, from Jhajjar district
- Gagan Narang, from Panipat district
- Kajal Saini

=== Paralympics ===
- Sumit Antil, javelin
- Dharambir Nain, club throw
- Manish Narwal, pistol
- Harvinder Singh, archer
- Navdeep Singh, javelin
- Sharmila Dhankar, Shot put

=== Football ===
- Sumeet Passi
- Ravi Kumar Punia
- Ritu Rani
- Aakash Sangwan
- Sanju Yadav

== Zaildars during British rule ==
- Chaudhari Nand Ram Saini
