= Mehar Singh Dahiya =

Haryanavi poet

Mehar Singh Dahiya (1916–1945) commonly known as Fauji Mehar Singh and Jat Mehar Singh, was a Haryanavi poet. He was born in the Dahiya clan of Jats in the village Barona in the Kharkhoda tahsil, in the district of Sonipat (formerly Rohtak district). In addition to Haryana, his ragnis are still popular in Delhi, Western Uttar Pradesh and Rajasthan. According to the records of the Jat Regiment, he was born on 15 February 1916. His father, Nand Ram, was a farmer. Due to the economic conditions of the house, his education ended after Class-III. From Childhood, he was fond of singing ragnis. His father was irritated by his son's propensity of singing ragnis, but he was unable to dissuade him from this pastime. He was married to Prem Kaur. In 1937, Mehar Singh joined the army where he kept singing and recording ragnis. During the Second World War, he and his army colleagues allied with the Azad Hind Fauj. In 1945, he died while fighting for the cause of India's freedom.

== Legacy ==
Some activities held in his native village and state, in his honour:

- The Fauji Jaat Mehar Singh Award is given to folk singers by the Chief Minister of Haryana State, for their contribution to promoting the culture and traditions of Haryana.
- 15 February is celebrated as a day in Memory of Mehar Singh and a Ragani Programme is organised every year.
- A school children's programme on November 14 is organised every year.
- A Health Camp is organised once a year in which retired and working doctors of PGIMS Rohtak participate on voluntary basis.
- A book of his writings has been published.
- A Statue of Mehar Singh has been installed in 2 acres of land donated by the Panchayat of the village.

== See also ==
- Saang
- Haryanvi Cinema
- Haryanvi music
- Haryanvi language
- Indian musical instruments
- List of Indian folk dances
- List of Haryanvi-language films
- Haryanvi cinema
- Baje Bhagat
- Dayachand Mayna
- Lakhmi Chand
