= Dada Lakhmi =

- Official Release Poster
- Directed by: Yashpal Sharma
- Written by: Yashpal Sharma
- Produced by: Ravindra Singh Rajawat; Yashpal Sharma
- Starring: Yashpal Sharma; Meghna Malik; Rajendra Gupta
- Cinematography: Supratim Bhol
- Edited by: Aseem Sinha; Rahul Tiwari
- Music by: Uttam Singh
- Production companies: Anhad Studio Pvt. Ltd. Yashvidya Films
- Release date: 8 November 2022 (India)
- Country: India
- Language: Haryanvi

Dada Lakhmi is a 2022 Indian Haryanvi language biographical film based on the musical journey of Haryanvi folk singer Lakhmi Chand also known as Kalidas of Haryana. The film is written and directed by Yashpal Sharma. The lead actors in the film are Yashpal Sharma, Meghna Malik and Rajendra Gupta. The film was released on 8 November 2022. The film has been awarded the 'National Film Award' by the President as the best Haryanvi film.

== Plot ==
Dada Lakhmi film is based on the true story of Haryanvi legend Pandit Lakhmi Chand, born into an ordinary farmer family. The film shows that Lakhmi had to resist society and his family's opposition to enter the field of art. The film shows how Dada Lakhmi became a famous singer of Haryana with his hard work and struggle and was honored with 'Surya Har' for composing Haryanvi music genres Saang and Raagni.

== Cast ==
- Yashpal Sharma as Lakhmi Chand
- Hitesh Sharma as Young Lakhmi Chand
- Meghna Malik
- Rajendra Gupta
- Yogesh Bhardwaj as Pandit Ji
- Rajendra Bhatia as Vaid
- Tanishq Chaudhary as Feku
- Vikram Malik as Shankar
- Naveen Nishad as Saangi
- Amit Pahel as Dhulia Khan
