= Music of Haryana =

Video of Dhol, string instrument (Ektara) and Been musicians at Surajkund International Crafts Mela (c. 12 Feb 2012).

Folk music of Haryana has two main forms: classical folk music of Haryana and desi folk music of Haryana (country music of Haryana). They take the form of ballads and pangs of parting of lovers, valor and bravery, harvest and happiness.

== History ==
Haryana is rich in musical tradition and even places have been named after ragas, for example Charkhi Dadri district has many villages named: Nandyam, Sarangpur, Bilawala, Brindabana, Todi, Asaveri, Jaisri, Malakoshna, Hindola, Bhairvi, and Gopi Kalyana.

== Folk music ==
A Haryanvi folk song about a Banjara (nomad)

=== Classical Folk Music of Haryana ===
The classical form of Haryana music is closely associated with and based on Indian classical music. The Indian state of Haryana has produced a number of kinds of folk music, and has also produced innovations in Indian classical music. Hindustani classical ragas are used to sing Alha-Khand (1663-1202 CE) about bravery of Alha and Udal, Jaimal Fatta of Maharana Udai Singh II of Chittor (Maharana Udai Singh was the son of Rana Sanga and the father of famous braveheart Maharana Pratap), Brahmas, Teej festive songs, Phaag songs of Phalgun month of Holi and Holi songs.

==== Variations ====
Mewati gharana is a musical apprenticeship tribe of Hindustani classical music in Mewat region. Known for being Pandit Jasraj's musical lineage, the gharana was founded by brothers Utd. Ghagge Nazir Khan and Utd. Wahid Khan (beenkar) of Bhopal in the late 19th century at the Jodhpur court. Consequently, it is also known (though less commonly) as the Jodhpur Gharana. With its own distinct aesthetics, stylings, practices, and repertoire, the gharana emerged as an offshoot of the Gwalior and Qawwal Bacchon (Delhi) musical traditions. The gharana gained visibility in the late-20th century after Pt. Jasraj popularized the gayaki.

=== Desi/country music of Haryana ===
The country-side or desi (native) form of Haryanvi music is based on Raag Bhairvi, Raag Bhairav, Raag Kafi, Raag Jaijaivanti, Raag Jhinjhoti and Raag Pahadi and used for celebrating community bonhomie to sing seasonal songs, ballads, ceremonial songs (wedding, etc.) and related religious legendary tales such as Puran Bhagat. Ahirs also use melodic Raag Pilu on a scale using seven semi-tones.

Kissa folklores of bravery and love such as Nihalde Sultan, Sati Manorama, Jai Singh ki Mrityu, Saran de, etc. are some of the most popular folklores. Rasa lila and "Ragini" are folk theatrical performance Haryana. The Ragini form of theater was popularised by Lakhmi Chand. Singing is a great way of demolishing societal differences as folk singers are highly esteemed and they are sought after and invited for events, ceremonies and special occasions regardless of the caste or status. Songs are based on day to day themes and injecting earthy humor enlivens the feel of the songs. Haryanvi dances have fast energetic movements, and popular dance forms are Khoriya, Chaupaiya, Loor, Been, Ghoomar, Dhamal, Phaag, Sawan and Gugga. Loor, which means girl in bangar area of Haryana, is performed in the form of questions and answers format by the girls in traditional haryanvi attire in the month of phalguna (spring) during the Holi festival to marks the arrival of pleasant spring season and sowing of the rabi crops.

Young girls and women usually sing entertaining and fast seasonal, love, relationship and friendship related songs such as Phagan (song for eponymous season/month), Katak (songs for the eponymous season/month), Samman (songs for the eponymous season/month), bande-bandi (male-female duet songs), sathne (songs of sharing heartfelt feelings among female friends). Older women usually sing devotional Mangal Geet (auspicious songs) and ceremonial songs such as Bhajan, Bhat (wedding gift to the mother of bride or groom by her brother), Sagai, Ban (Hindu wedding ritual where pre-wedding festivities starts), Kuan-Poojan (a custom that is performed to welcome the birth of male child by worshiping the well or source of drinking water), Sanjhi and Holi festival.

All these are inter-caste songs, which are fluid in nature, are never personalized for specific caste. These are sung collectively by women from different strata, castes, dialects so these songs do change fluidly in dialect, style, words, etc. This adoptive style can be seen from adoption of tunes of Bollywood movie songs into Haryanvi songs. Despite this fluid nature, haryanvi songs have a distinct style of their own.

A Haryanvi folk story

=== Traditional musicians and artists ===
The folk music of Haryana has been spread by the Bhats, Saangis and Jogis. Baje Bhagat, Bharatchandra kaushik, Dayachand Mayna, and Lakhmi Chand are some popular early era Haryana artists.

=== Music Instruments ===
Music is made using many traditional instruments Sarangi, Harmonium, Chimta, Dhadd, Dholak, Manjeera, Khartal, Damaru, Duggi, Daf, Bansuri, Been, Ghungroo, Dhak, Gharha (by adding rubber cover on top of the pitcher), Thali (beaten with a stick to make music) and Shankha.

Other instruments are:

- Bansuri: wind instrument with an ancient history
- Been - two bamboo pipes fixed in a gourd, associated with snake charmers
- Iktara - a stringed instrument with one string, made from a piece of bamboo with a gourd at one end. Associated with the Jogis. The iktara's two-stringed relative is the dotara.
- Sarangi - a bow instrument, used both in Haryana's folk and classical music
- Shankh - a sacred wind instrument, associated with Vishnu
- Shehnai - wind instrument

== Gallery ==
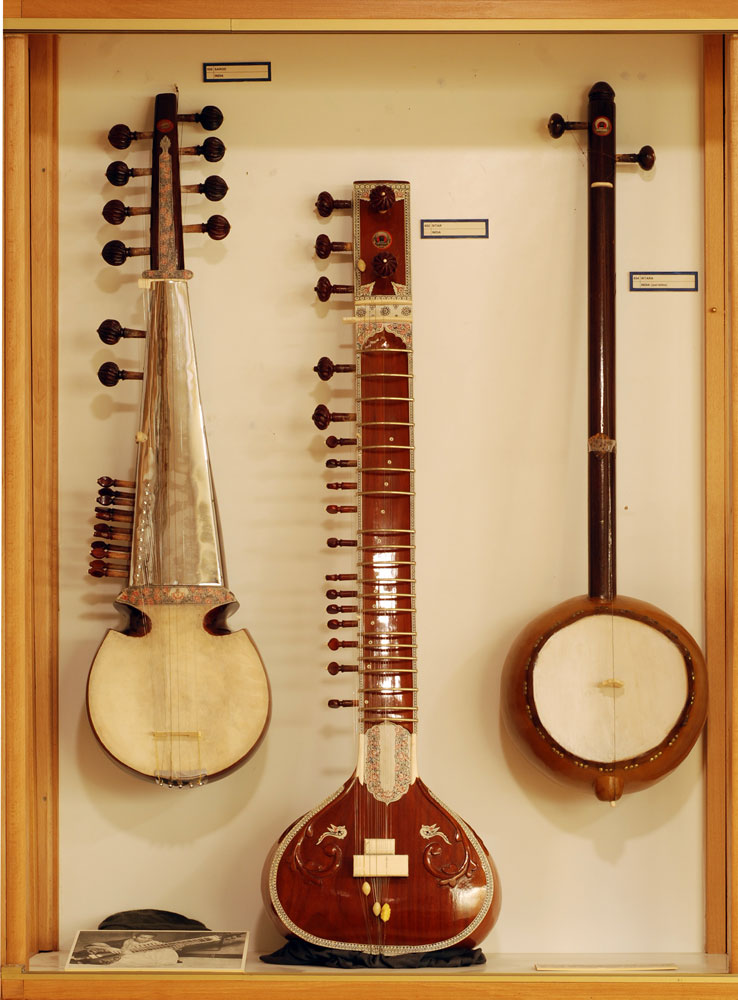
Sarod, Sitar and Iktara

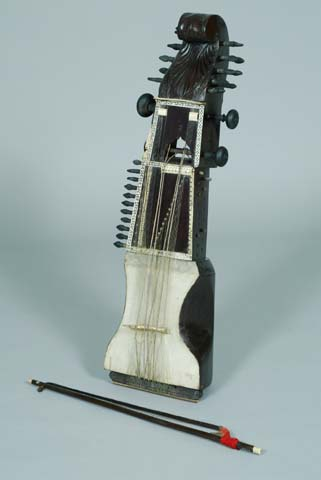
Sarangi

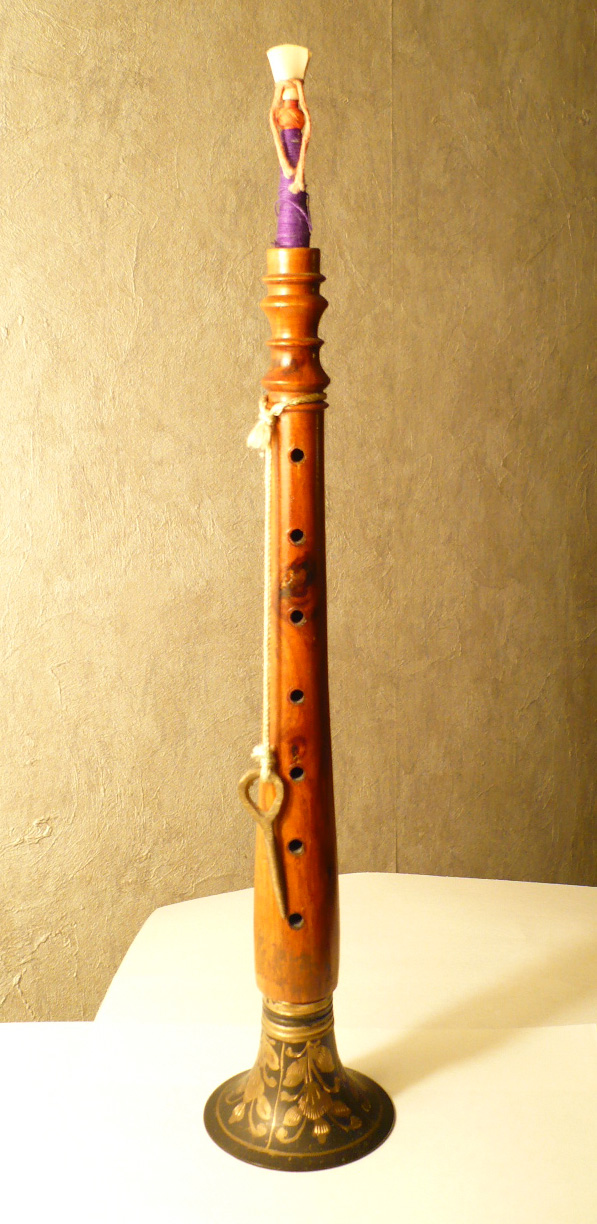
Shehnai

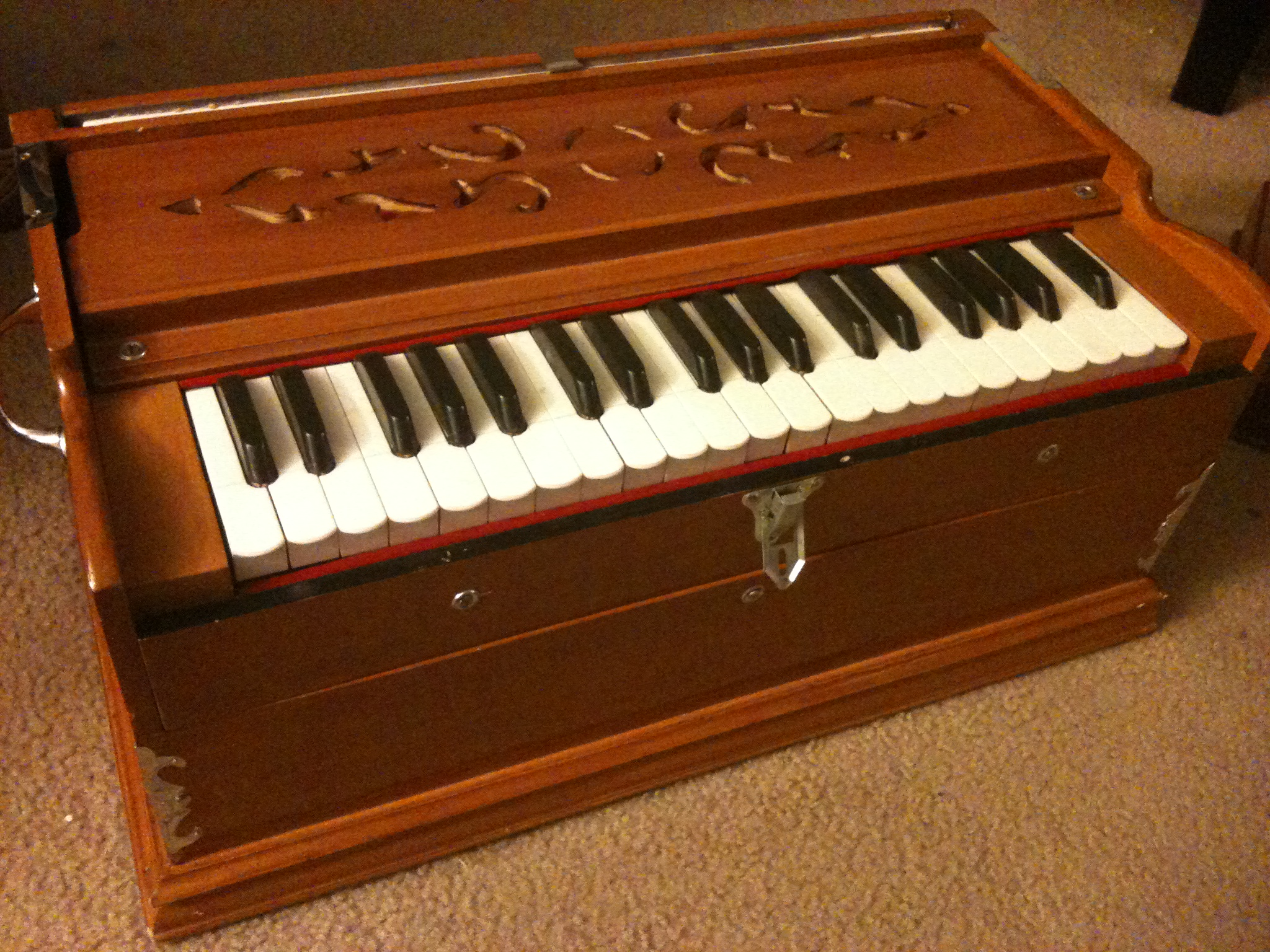
Harmonium

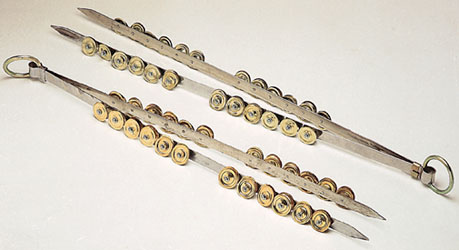
Chimta

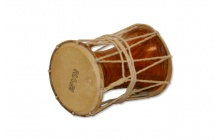
Dhadd

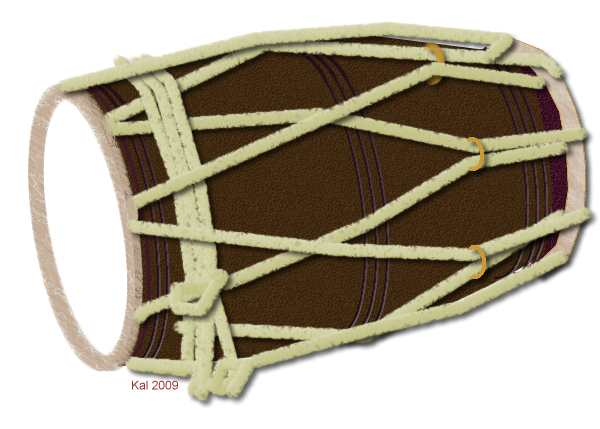
Dholak

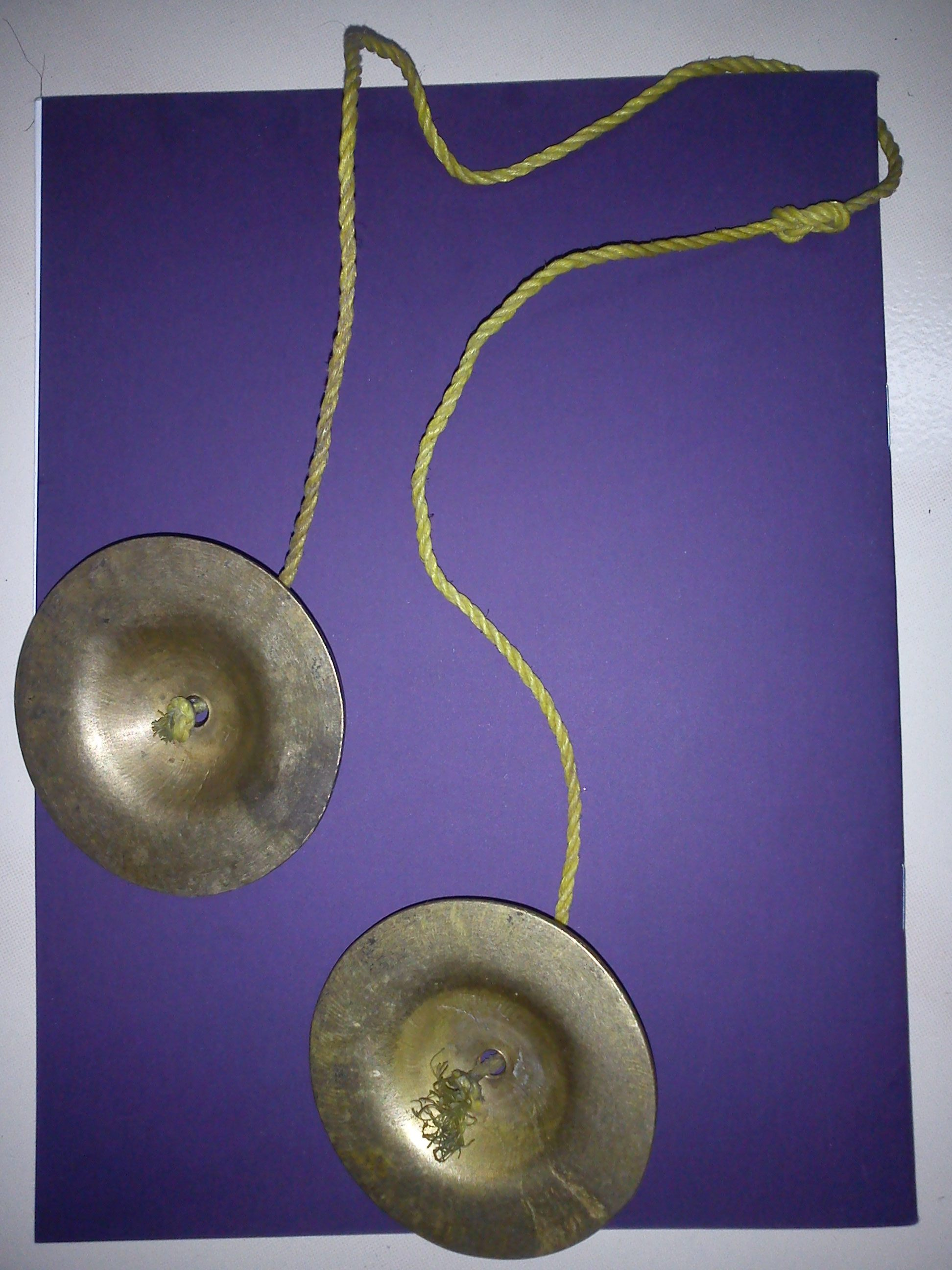
Manjeera

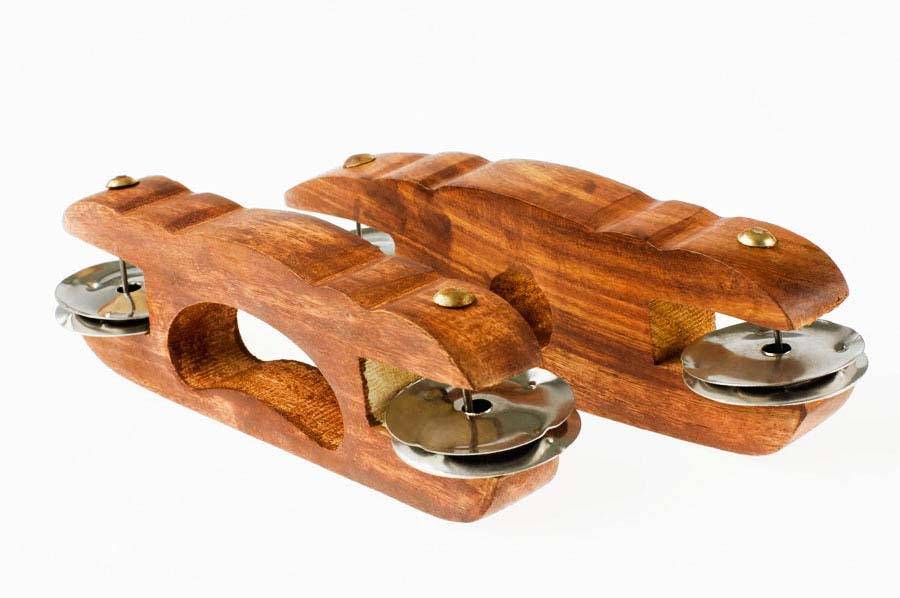
A pair of Khartal blocks

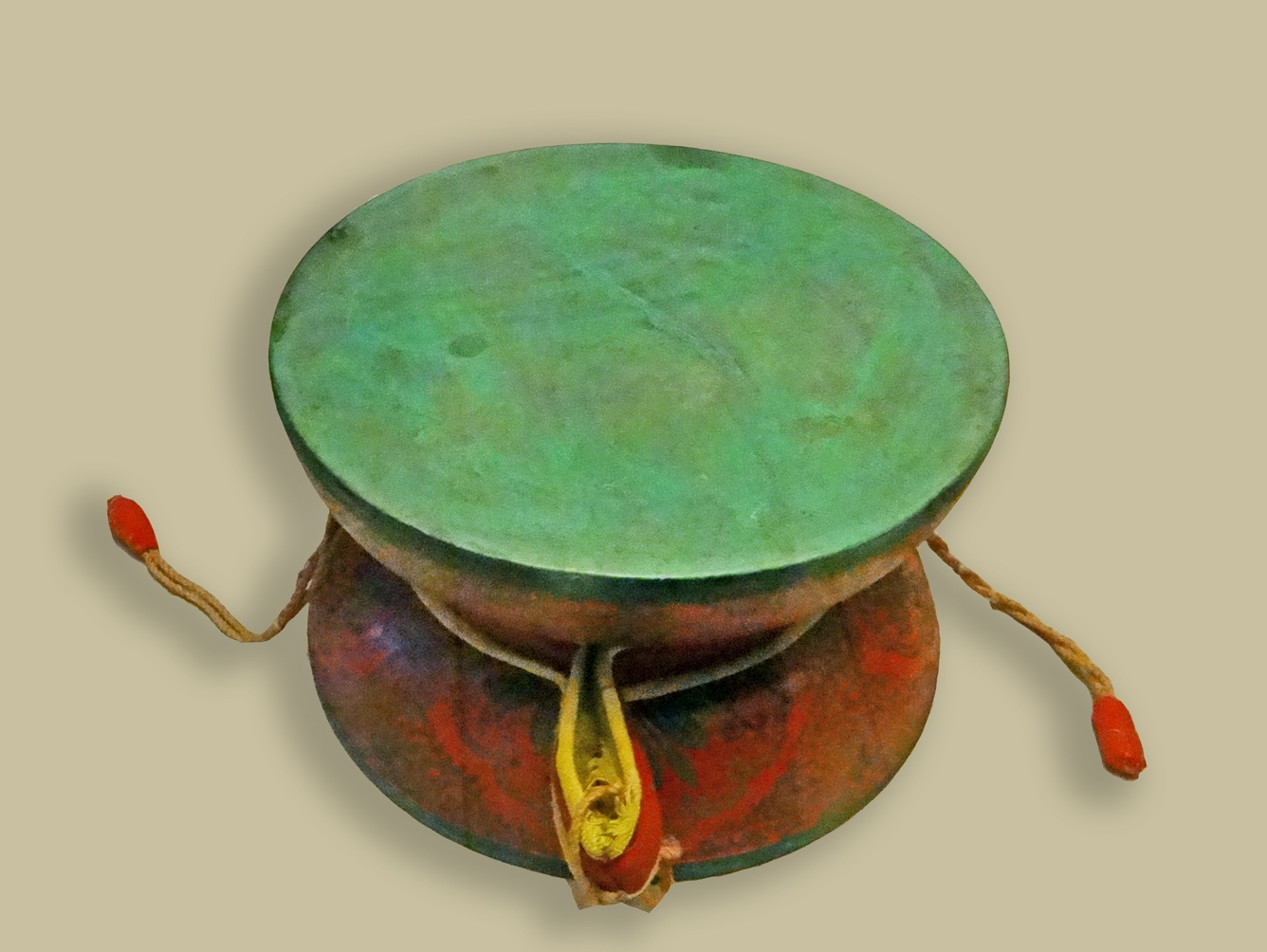
Damaru

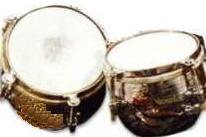
Duggi (drum)

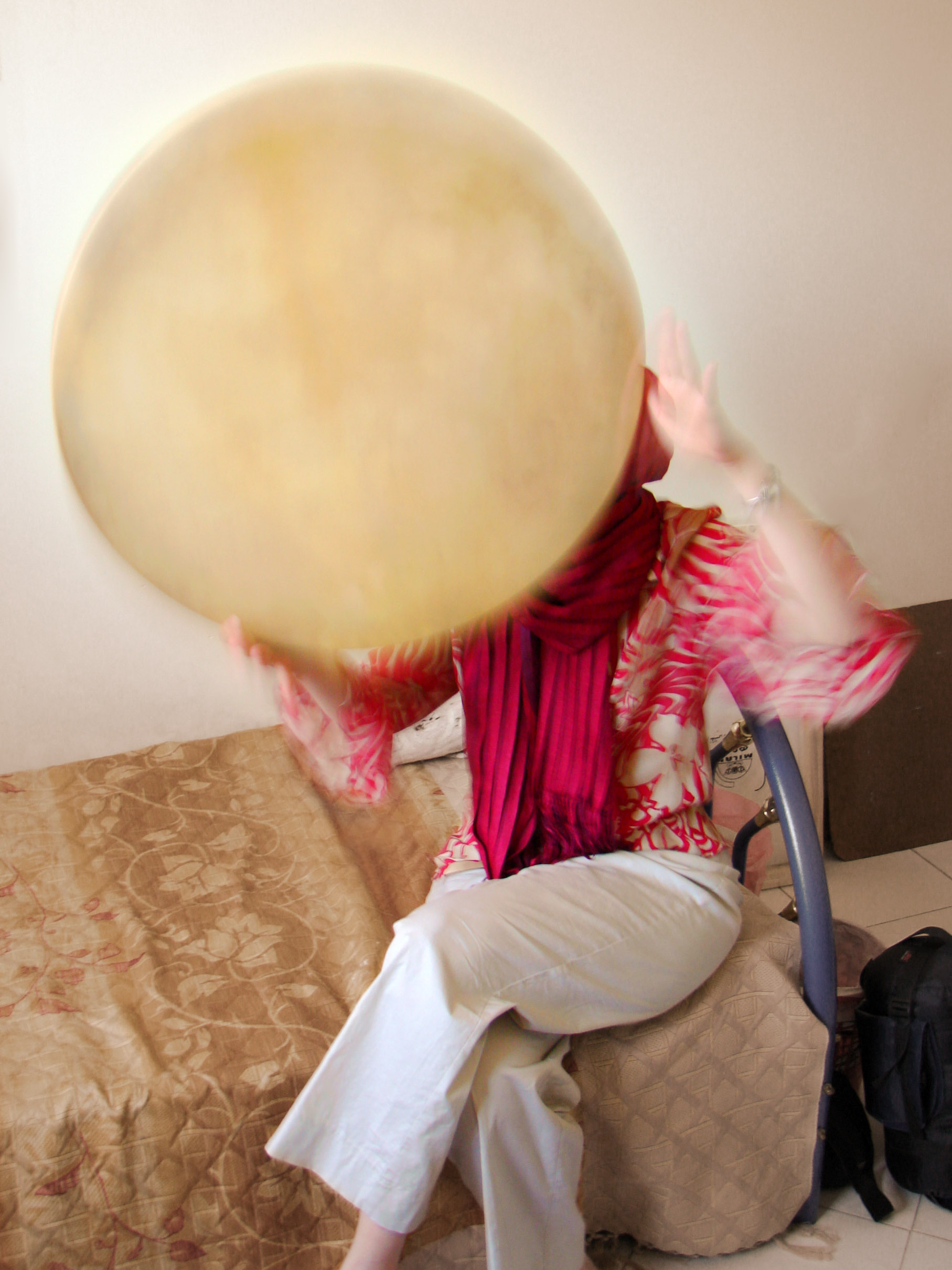
A woman playing a Daf

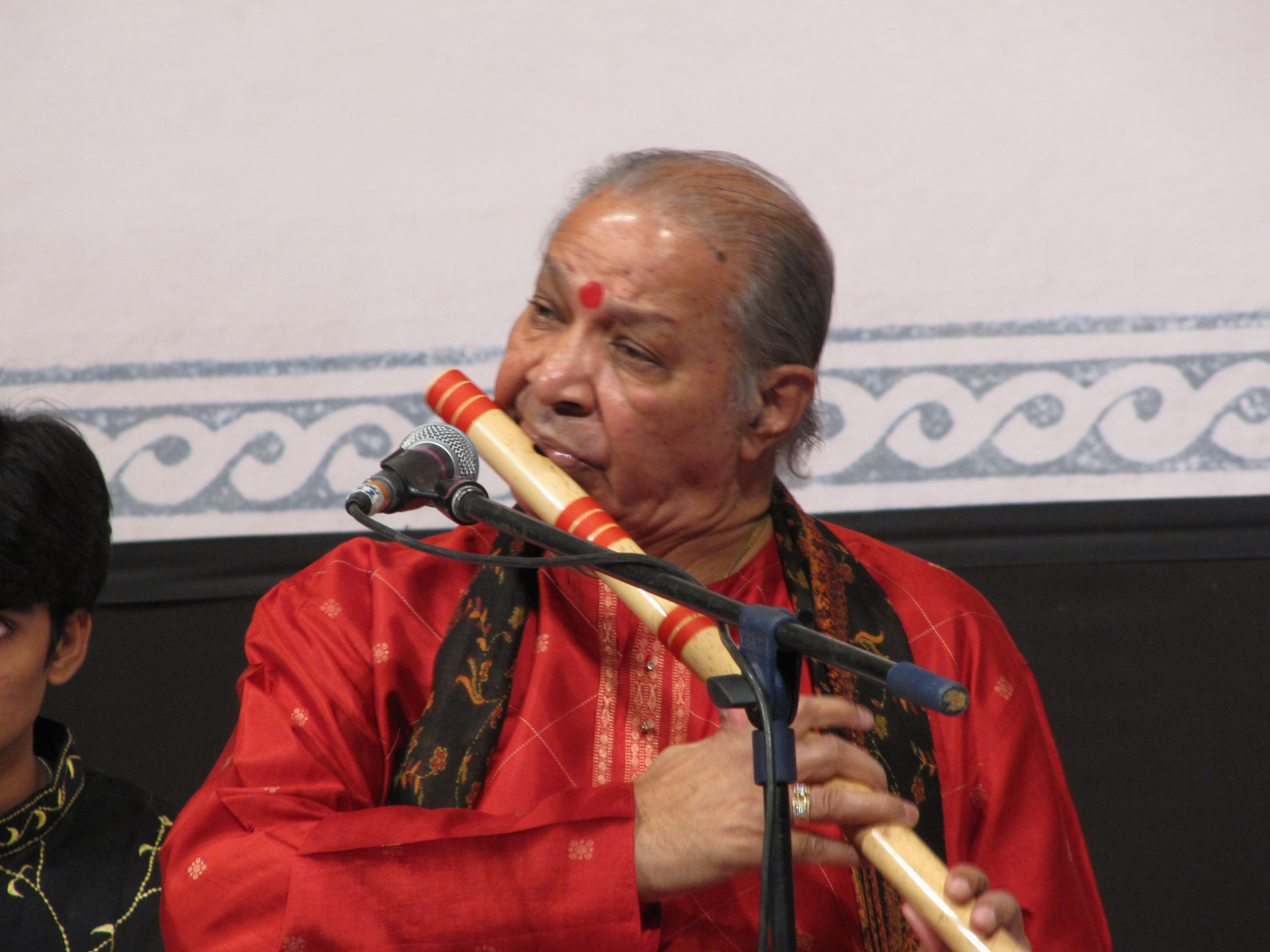
Hariprasad Chaurasia playing the Bansuri

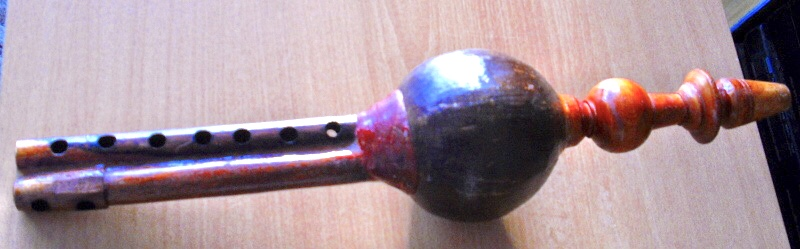
Been

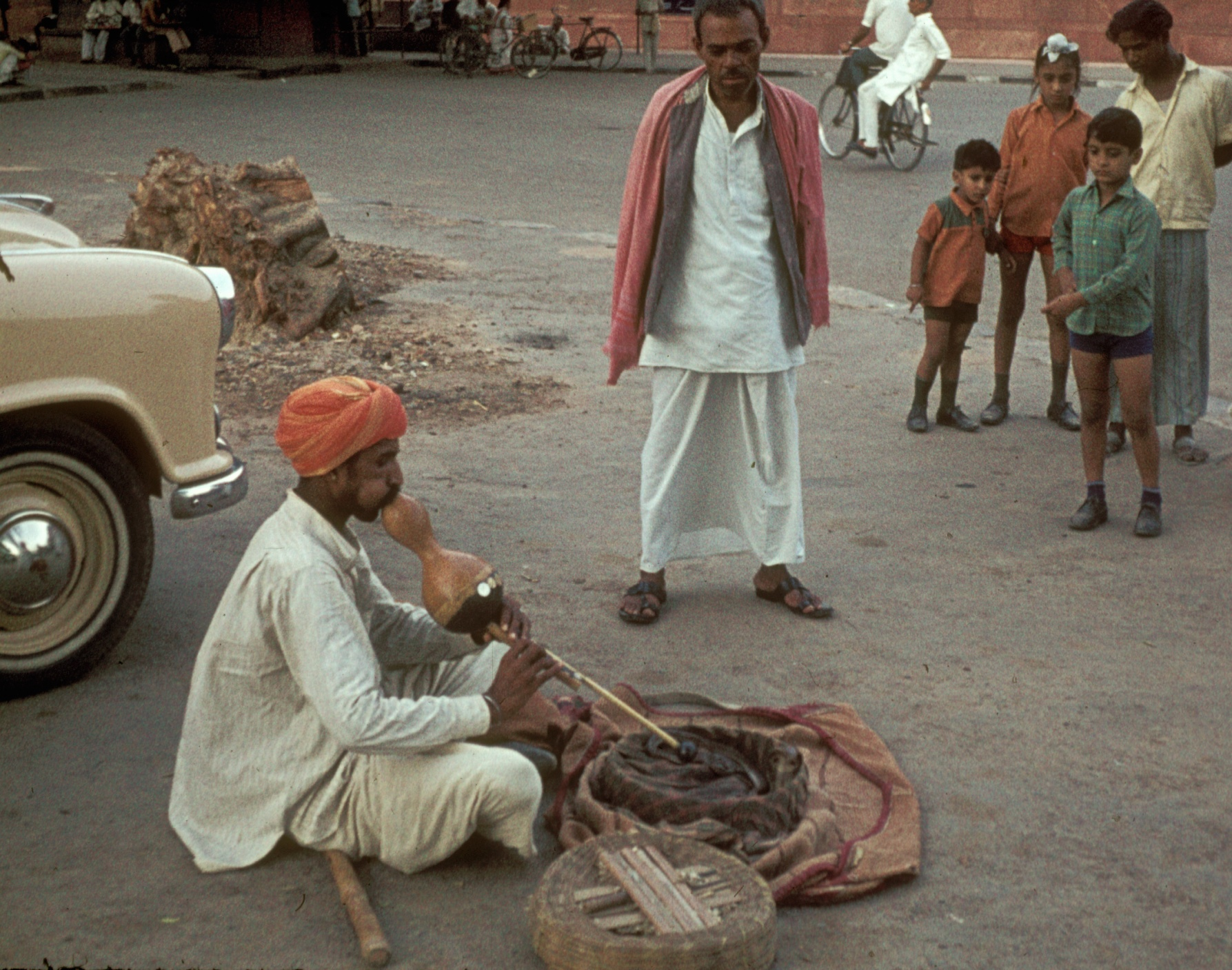
A Snake Charmer playing Been

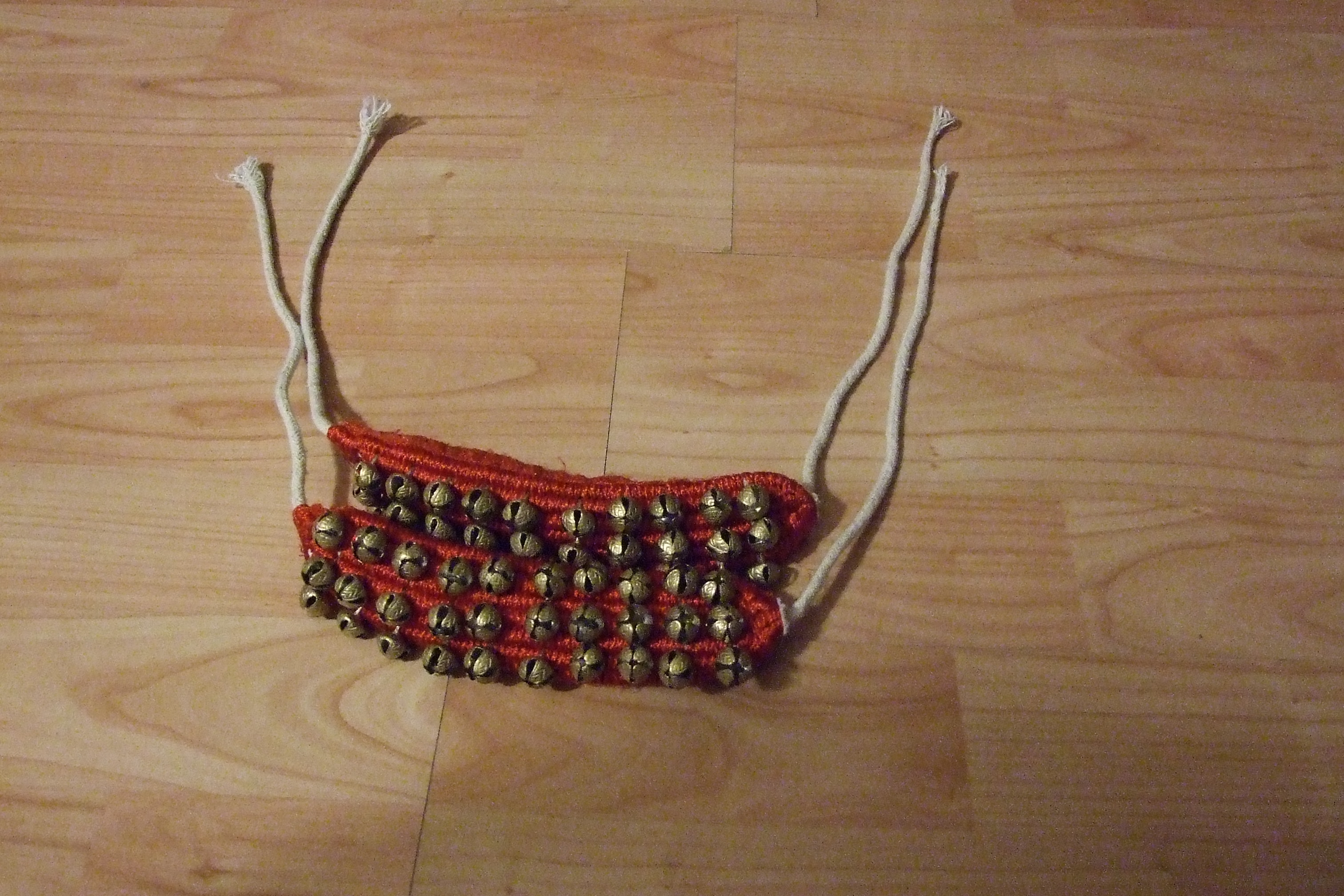
A pair of Ghungroos

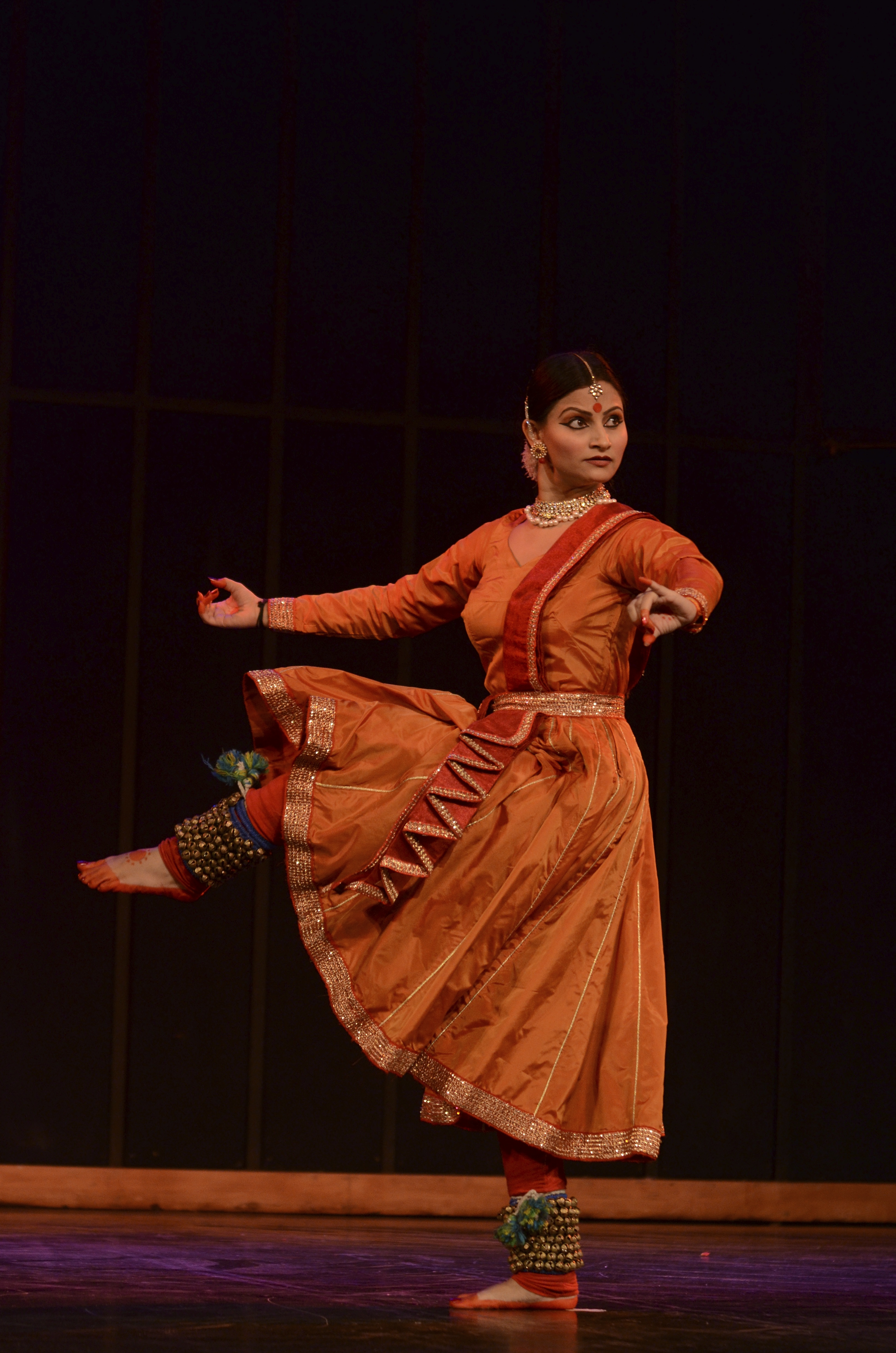
Danseuse with 400 Ghungroos

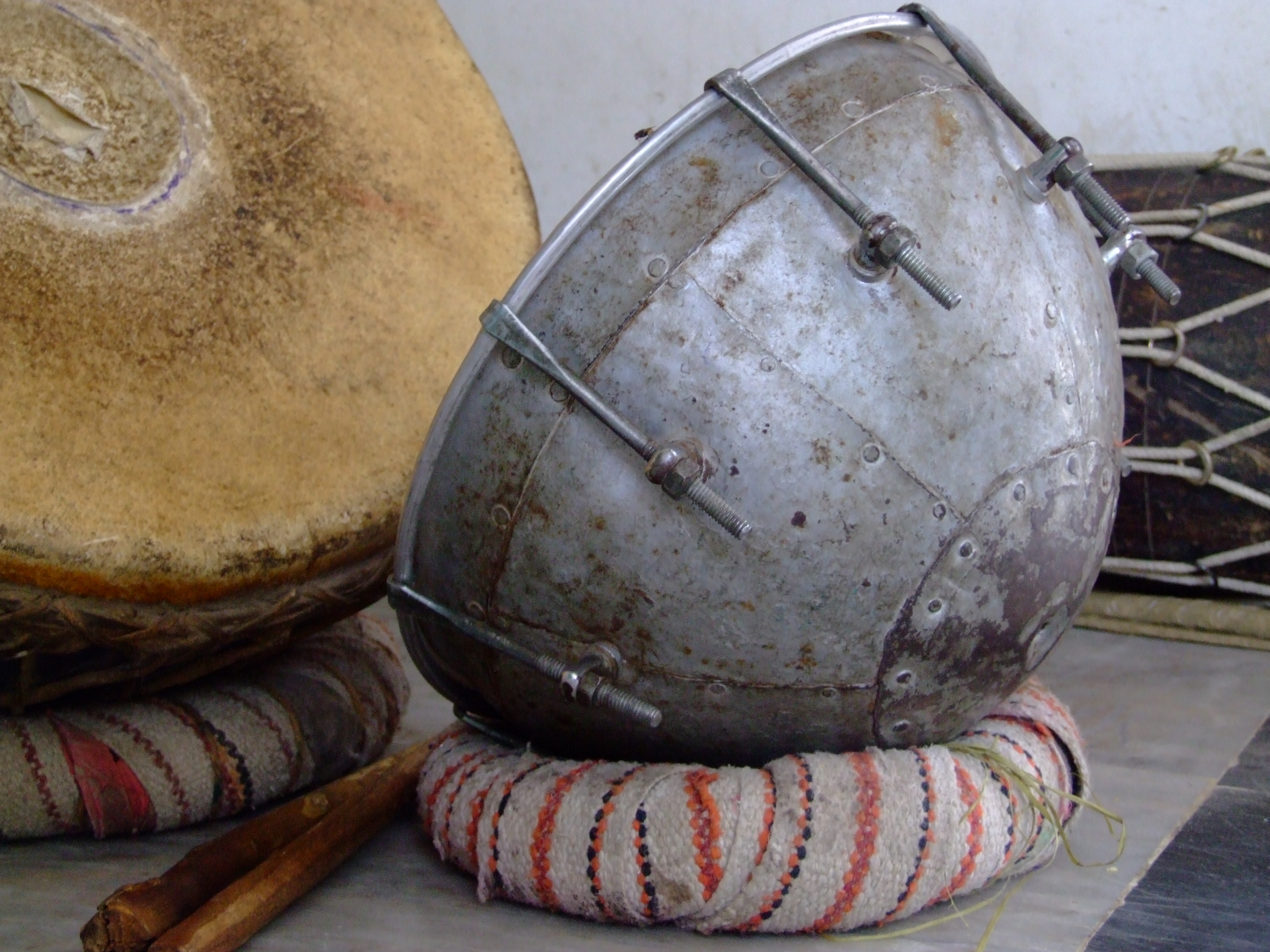
Nagara are kettledrums which accompany shehnai

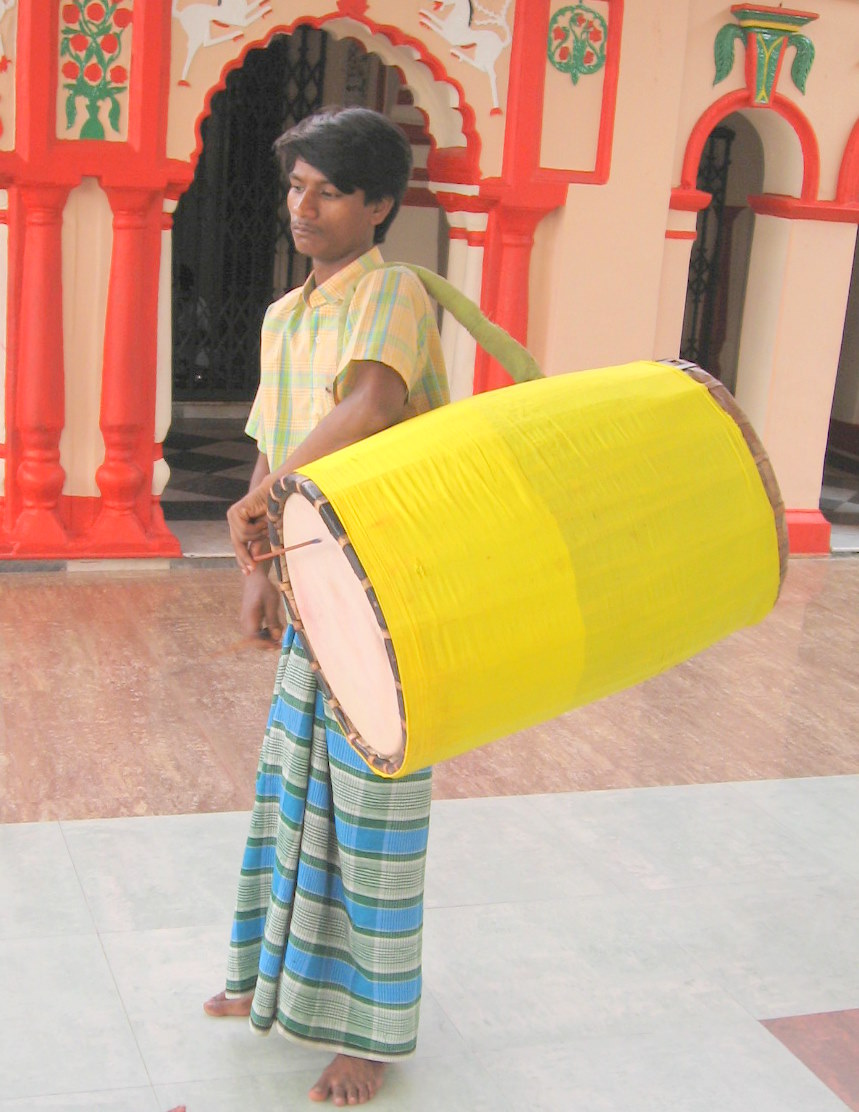
Dhak

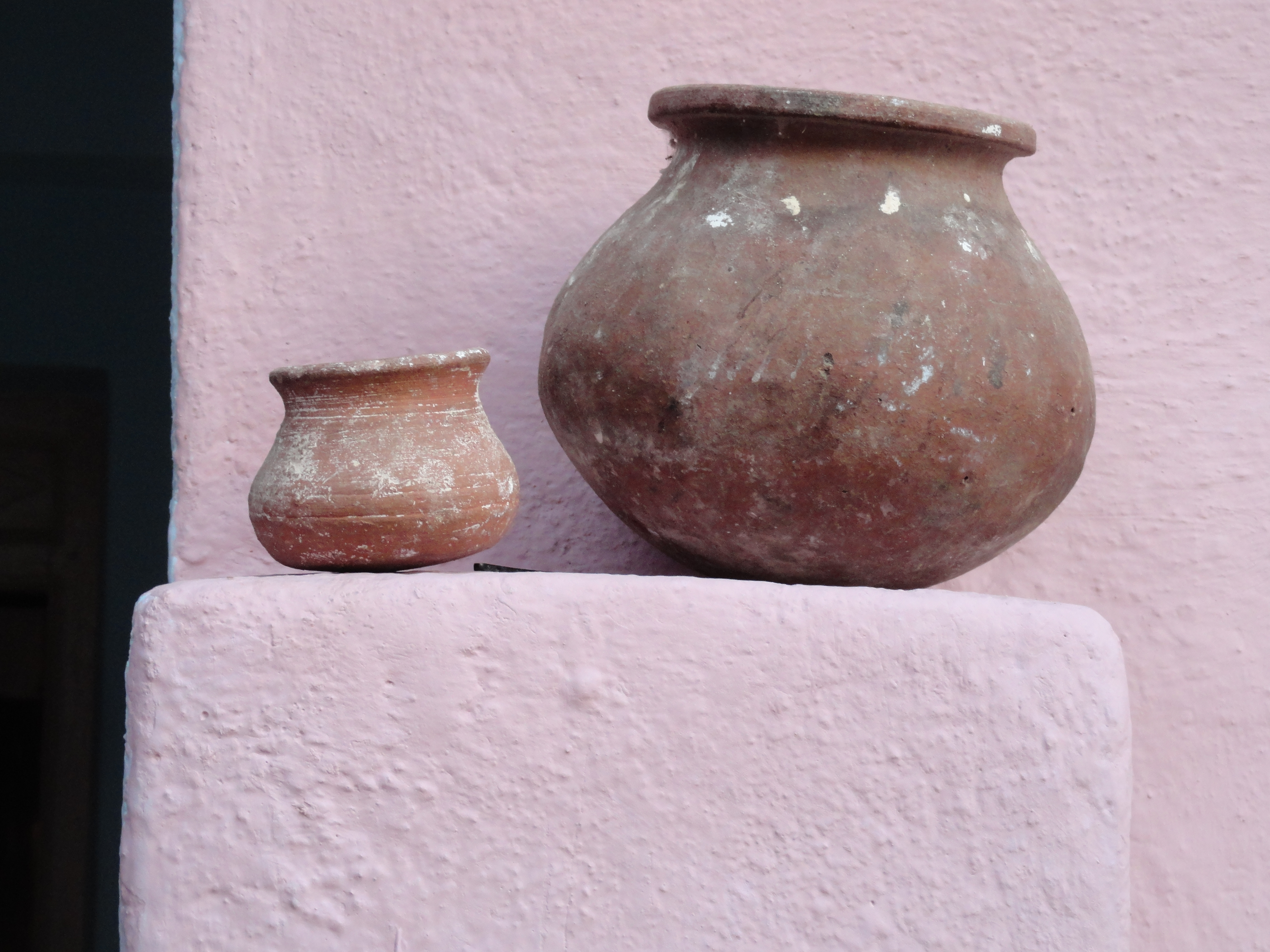
Gharha is made by adding rubber cover on top of the pitcher

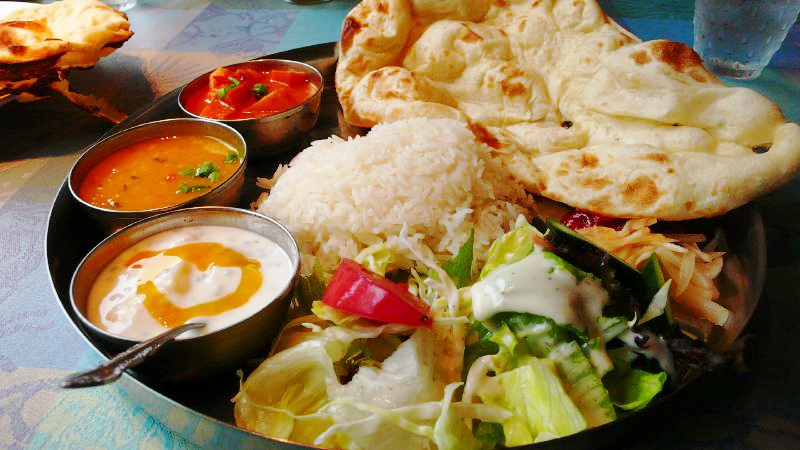
Thali is used to serve food and beaten with a stick to make music

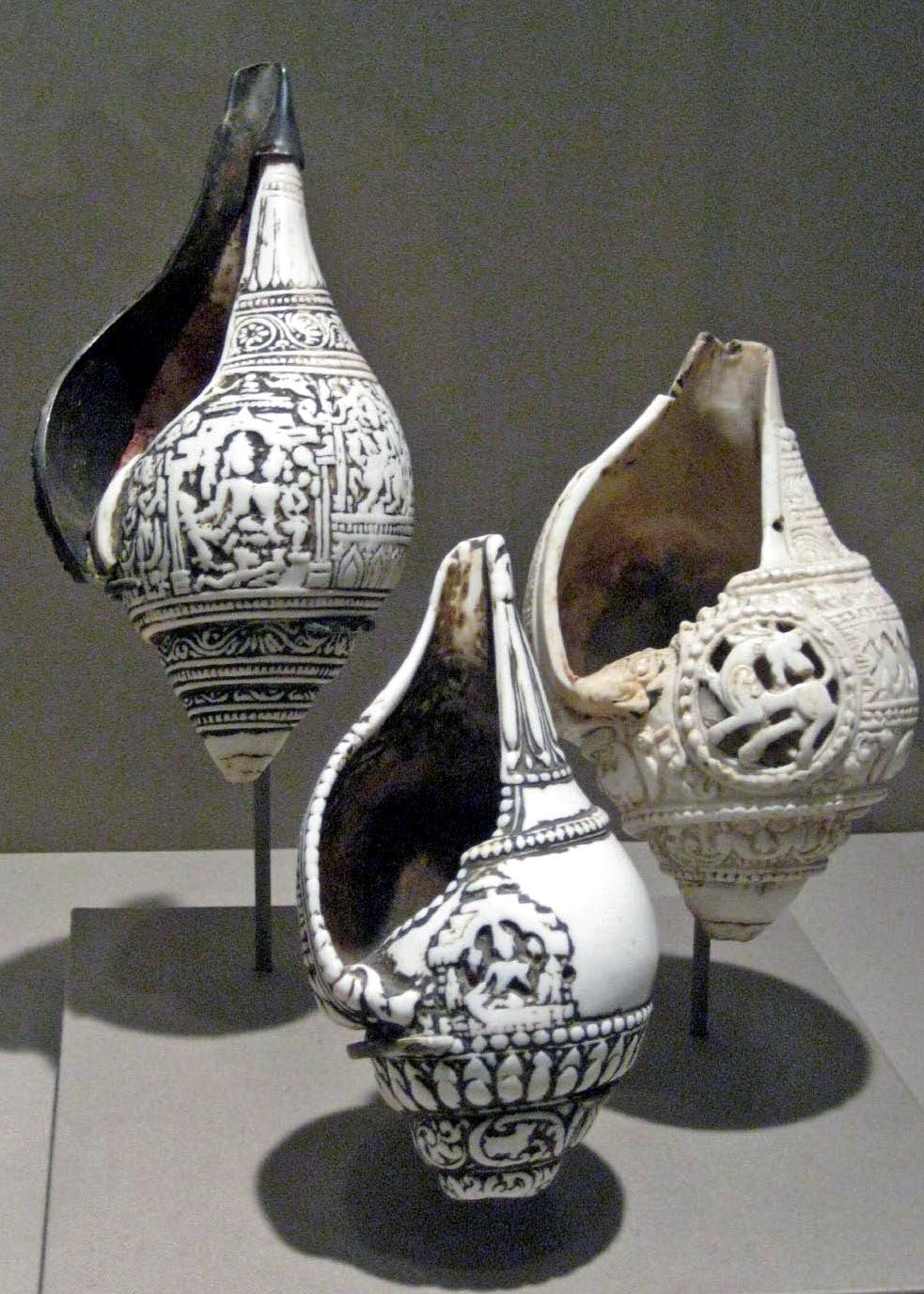
Carved Vamavarta Shankhas, circa 11-12th century, Pala period

== See also ==
- Administrative divisions of Haryana
- Haryanvi cinema
- Haryanvi culture
- Haryanvi cultural tourism
- Haryanvi folk dances
- Haryanvi language
- Haryanvi people
- Haryanvi Raagni
- Haryanvi saang
- Indian musical instruments
- List of Haryanvi-language films
- List of people from Haryana
