= Saini =

Caste of North India

- Country: Primarily India
- Populated states: Punjab, India, Haryana, Himachal Pradesh, Jammu & Kashmir, Chandigarh and Delhi

Saini is a farming and landowning caste of northern India. The community is given representation in government jobs and educational institutes as an Other Backward Class (OBC) in the states of Uttar Pradesh, Punjab, Haryana, Rajasthan and Madhya Pradesh.

As both a statutory agricultural tribe and a designated martial race during the British Raj era that followed the Indian Rebellion of 1857, Sainis had been chiefly engaged in both agriculture and military service. Since the independence of India, they have diversified into white-collar professions.

== History ==
Gahlot and Banshidhar indicate some commonality in origin with Rajput Malis of Rajputana, who also claim to be of Rajput descent.

=== British era ===
During the British period Sainis were classified as both a statutory agricultural tribe and, later, a martial race. The latter was an administrative device based on the now-discredited theories of scientific racism: ethnic communities were categorised as being either martial or non-martial, with the latter being those who were thought to be unfit to serve in armies due to their sedentary lifestyles. The community was also one of several peasant peoples who benefitted from the development of the Punjab Canal Colonies, through which they obtained land grants from the British authorities, especially in the Chenab Colony following the introduction of the Punjab Land Alienation Act, 1900.

Some Saini landlords were also appointed as zaildars, or revenue-collectors, in various districts.

=== Post Independence India ===
Castes similar to Sainis in north India are Koeri, Kushwaha, Maurya and Shakya. Over the time, these communities have come together and started inter-marrying among themselves for caste consolidation.

== Marriage ==
According to the Anthropological Survey of India, "The Saini are endogamous community and observe exogamy at village and gotra level." Remarriage after the death of a spouse is permitted nowadays, as is divorce.

== Notable people ==
Notable people who bear the name and may or may not be associated with the caste are:

=== Armed forces ===
- Joginder Singh (Param Vir Chakra)

=== Indian freedom movement ===
- Gurdan Saini (Rajput General- died in Ranthambore also known as Rana Gurdan Saini)
- Harnam Singh Saini (Ghadar movement, died - hanged on 16 March 1917 after Lahore Conspiracy Case trial)

=== Religious and political leaders ===
- Labh Singh Saini (Akali dal president)
- Jathedar Sadhu Singh Bhaura (Akal Takht Jathedar)

=== Sports ===
- Sandeep Singh Saini a field hockey player from Shahabad town of Haryana

=== Civilians with titles ===
- Chaudhari Nand Ram Saini (Zaildar from Hissar Division)
- Sardar Nanu Singh Saini(Sikh army General and well Known Jagirdar in Phulkian Rayast)

=== Others ===
- Sumedh Singh Saini (former Director general of police of Punjab, India
- Gurbux Saini, Canadian MP
