= Nihal =

Nihal means satisfied in Hindi language

Nihal may refer to:

- Nihal (name), people with the name
- Beta Leporis, a star traditionally known as Nihal
- Nihāl, a tribe that inhabits parts of Central India; cf. Nihali language
- Nihal the hero of the fantasy saga by Licia Troisi Le Cronache del mondo emerso
