= Nihal (name) =

Nihal or Nahal /ˈniːhæl/ is an Asian given name that may refer to the following notable people:

- Nihal Arthanayake, English radio and TV presenter known as DJ Nihal
- Nihal Atsız, Turkish writer
- Nihal Bhareti, Sri Lankan radio personality
- Nihal Güres, Turkish artist
- Nihal Nelson, Sri Lankan baila singer
- Nihal Seneviratne (1934–2026), Sri Lankan civil servant, secretary general of the Parliament of Sri Lanka (1981–1994)
- Nihal Singh, Indian royalty
- Nihal Singh Takshak, Indian freedom fighter
- Nihal Sarin, Indian chess player
- Nihal Sudeesh (born 2001), Indian footballer
- Nihal Yeğinobalı, Turkish writer
- Şükûfe Nihal Başar (1896–1973), Turkish school teacher, poet, novelist and women's right activist
