= Dayachand Mayna =

Poet of Haryanvi language

Dayachand Mayna was a poet of Haryanvi language. He is one of the important poets and folklore artists Haryana had ever produced. He was born on 10 March 1915, in a Valmiki caste family in Mayna village of Rohtak district of Haryana (erstwhile Punjab). He produced best of the Haryanvi Saang and Raagni. He wrote a very famous play (Kissa) on Netaji Subhash Chandra Bose. He wrote 21 Kissas(play in Haryanvi) and more than 150 Raagniyaan(poem in Haryanvi). He died on 20 January 1993.

== Legacy ==
He is regarded as John Milton of Haryana, his poetry in Haryanvi is not less than Lakhmi Chand. Dr. Rajendra Badgujar in his book argued that "if you want to know Haryanvi folklore then you have to read Mahashaya Dayachand Mayna. Apart from poetry, he is considered a freedom fighter for his service in the Indian National Army. Dayachand Mayna had many disciples including most famous Chajjulal Silana.

== Publications ==
- Budgujar, Rajender (Ed.) (2011). Mahashaya Dayachand Mayna Haryanvi Granthawali. Kaithal, Haryana: Sukriti Prakashan. ISBN 978-8188796236
- Budgujar, Rajender (Ed.) (2012). Dayachand Mayna Ki Chuninda Raagniyaan. Kaithal, Haryana: Sukriti Prakashan. ISBN 978-8188796724

== See also ==
- Baje Bhagat
- Lakhmi Chand
- Music of Haryana
- Haryanvi cinema
- List of Haryanvi-language films
