= Brijendra Kumar Rao =

Indian anesthesiologist (born 1954)

- Born: 23 March 1954 (age 72); Rewari, Haryana, India
- Occupations: Anesthesiologist; Critical care specialist
- Known for: Anesthesiology; Medical administration
- Awards: Padma Bhushan

Brijendra Kumar Rao (born 23 March 1954) is an Indian anesthesiologist, critical care specialist, medical administrator and the chairman of the Board of Management of Sir Ganga Ram Hospital, New Delhi. He heads the department of critical care medicine and anesthesiology at the hospital and is a member of the Board of Governors of the Medical Council of India. He has attended several medical conferences to deliver keynote addresses.

== Honours ==
The Government of India awarded him the third highest civilian honour of the Padma Bhushan, in 2009, for his contributions to medical science.

== Early life ==
Dr. B.K. Rao was born in village Majra Gurdas, Rewari district, Haryana, India on 23 March 1954. He obtained MBBS and MD degrees from Maulana Azad Medical College, Delhi. He married his classmate, Dr. Manju Mehra, who retired as Dy. MS of G.B. Pant Hospital, Delhi.
