= Deep Chand Bahman =

- Born: Khanda, Sonipat, Haryana
- Occupations: Poet and Saang artist
- Writing career
- Language: Haryanvi language
- Notable awards: Rai Sahib

Deep Chand Bahman was a celebrated Saang artist of Haryana. He was born in Khanda, Sonipat Haryana. He was popularly known as Shakespeare or Kalidas of Haryana. He played great role in enriching Haryanvi dialect of Hindi and preserving the ragni sang culture of Rohtak belt. Mahashaya Deep Chand with his sangs gathered the donations and founded the Bhatgaon Gaushala.

== Early life ==
Pt. Deep Chand was great Saang theatre artist born in Brahmin family of Khanda village of Sonipat district Haryana. During the First World War the British Government gave him a title of Rai Sahib and granted him other favours.

== Famous writings ==
- Raja Harishchandra
- Jyani Chor
- Raja Bhoj
- Gopichand Maharaj
- Utanpad
- Bhakti Bhav
- Yug Chetna
