= J. P. Yadav =

Indian biogerontologist

Prof. J. P. Yadav
- Born: 1 January 1964 (age 62); Khatiwas, Jhajjar, Haryana
- Other names: Jay Parkash Yadav
- Education: Ph.D.
- Parent: Laxmi Datt Yadav
- Awards: Prof. R.P. Roy Young Scientist by Society of Cytology and Genetics, India
- Scientific career
- Fields: Molecular genetics
- Institutions: Maharshi Dayanand University

Jay Parkash Yadav (born January 1, 1964) is Vice-Chancellor, Indira Gandhi University, Rewari since April 3, 2022 to April, 2025. He is an Indian biologist and professor of genetics best known for his research on genetics. He was awarded Prof. R.P. Roy Young Scientist by Society of Cytology and Genetics, India.

== Early life ==
He was born in Khatiwas village of Jhajjar District in Haryana State.

== Education ==
In 1986 he completed his M. Sc. Biosciences and in 1991 Ph. D. Biosciences was awarded.

== career ==
He is head in Department of Genetics in Maharshi Dayanand University, Rohtak. In 2008 he was awarded UGC fellowship under education Cultural Exchange Programme to visit South Africa. International Travel Grant from CSIR, New Delhi & CCSTDS, Chennai to attend SEGH 2010 at Ireland was awarded in 2010.

== Research ==
He is a knowledgeable researcher with over 200 research papers published in international journals. He has also supervised several Ph.D. candidates.

== Books ==
- Environmental Education, G.V.S. Publisher, 3746, Ist Floor, Kucha Parmanand, Darya Ganj New Delhi (2002). Pages 1–545. ISBN 81-87865-00-8.
- Medicinal Plants and Genetic Diversity. LAP LAMBERT Academic Publishing GmbH & Co., Germany (2012). Pages 296. ISBN 978-3-8473-3966-3.
- Activity of Medicinal Plants Against Isolates of Oral Cancer Cases. LAP LAMBERT Academic Publishing GmbH & Co., Germany (2012). Pages 240. ISBN 978-3-659-14921-4.
- Genetic diversity and hypoglycemic studies of Salvadora species. LAP LAMBERT Academic Publishing GmbH & Co., Germany (2013). Pages 224. ISBN 978-3-659-38567-4.
