= Chaudhari Nand Ram Saini =

Nand Ram Saini was appointed as Zaildar during the British Raj rule of India. He inherited the Zaildari in 1906 when his father died. He was appointed Zaildar from Hissar division of Punjab region.

== Early life and career ==
Saini was born in the present-day Hisar of Haryana, India to Chaudhari Mohan Lal Saini of Hissar.

== Indian Independence Movement ==
He gave up the Zalidari in 1921 in order to support the Indian independence movement. Later, he became a member of the Indian National Congress and was also head of Hindu Mahasabha for Hissar briefly before rejoining Congress again in 1959. He died in 1973 at the age of 90.

== See also ==
- Sardar Nanu Singh Saini - Sikh army general and a well-known jagirdar in Phulkian riyasat
