= Saang =

Popular Indian folk theatre form

Saang, also known as Swang (meaning "imitation") or Svang, is a popular folk dance–theatre form and a traditional style of storytelling in Haryana, Uttar Pradesh, Rajasthan and the Malwa region of Madhya Pradesh. Swang incorporates suitable theatrics and mimicry (or naqal) accompanied by song and dialogue. It is dialogue-oriented rather than movement-oriented. Religious stories and folk tales are enacted by a group of ten or twelve persons in an open area or an open-air theatre surrounded by the audience. Swang as an art of imitation means Rang-Bharna, Naqal-Karna.

Swang can be considered as the most ancient folk theatre form in India. Nautanki, Saang, Tamasha originated from the Swang traditions. Old Swang traditions are:

"EK MARDANA EK JANANA MANCH PAR ADE THE RAI"

means one male and one female performers start the story.

"EK SAARANGI EK DHOLAKIA SAATH MEIN ADE THE RAI"

means one sarangi player and one dholak player joins the performance. This Swang/Saang performance was active at the time of Kabir Sant and Guru Nanak.

Tradition credits Kishan Lal Bhaat for laying the foundation of the present style of Swang about two hundred years ago. During the Mughal period, and specifically at the time of the Aurangzeb, women were strictly banned from public performances. Since women did not participate in the dance-drama form, men have traditionally enacted their roles. Later on different performers changed the style according to the socio-political situations.

== Features ==
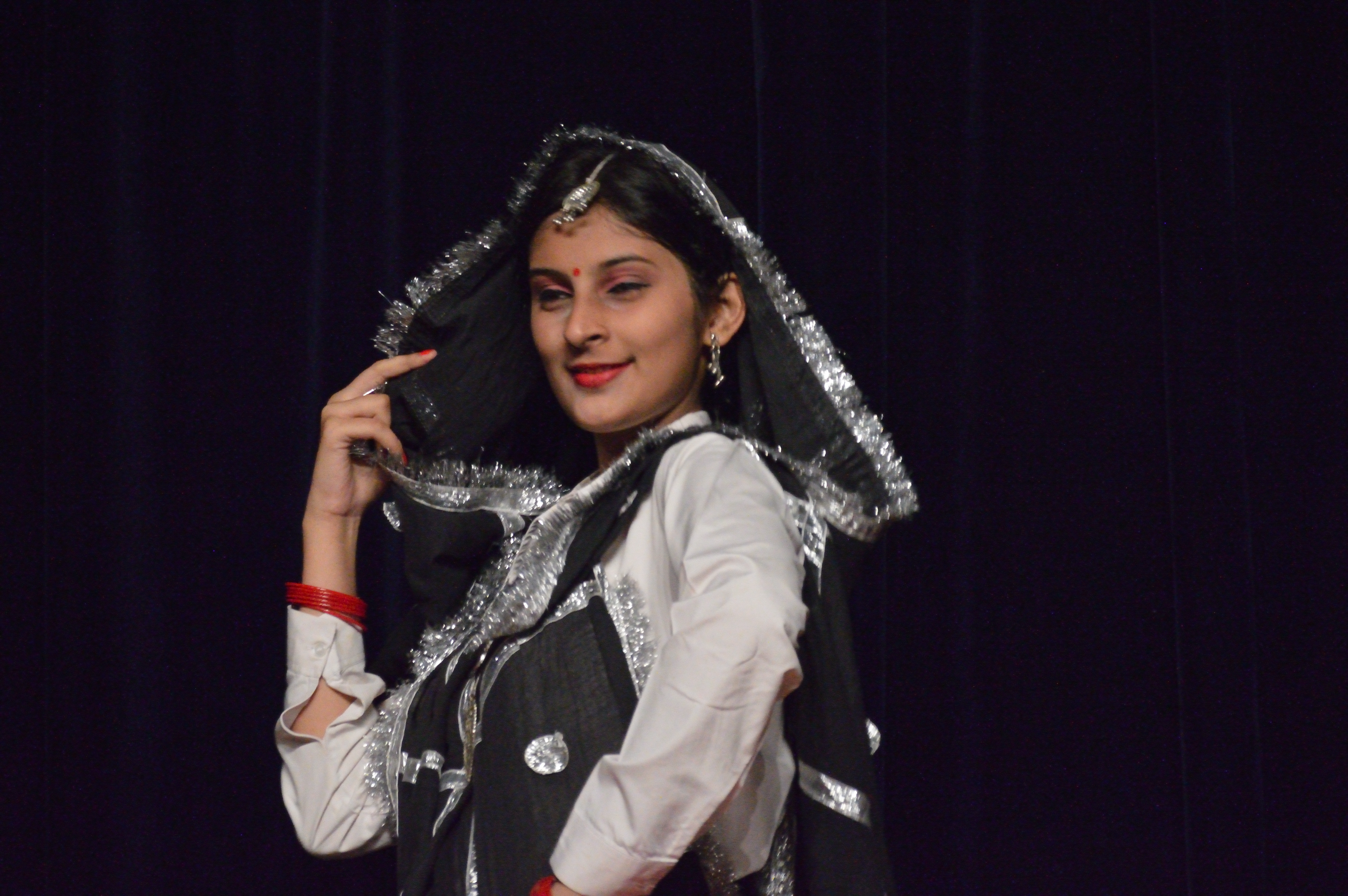
Haryanvi artist performing Raagni

Stage is similar to operatic performance. The stage may consist of a clear circular open area, or at the most, a wooden platform about three and a half metre in length. There are no elaborate stage arrangements similar to modern dramatic performances. There are no backdrops, curtains or green-rooms. Typically, there are no microphones or loudspeakers either. An hour or so before the show, the musicians of the orchestra begin to sing religious or other songs connected with the play in order to create the proper atmosphere for the play. The 'Guru' then appears and the artistes touch his feet to evoke his blessings. The play opens with a song ('bhait' or offering) in praise of Bhawani, the Goddess of Knowledge:

Aa re bhawani baas kar mere ghat ke parde khol Rasna par basa karo maai shudh shabd mukh bol

(Oh Goddess Bhawani, open the doors of knowledge to me. Bless my tongue so that all I sing consists of pure surs.)

After Bhawani there are Chamolas, Kafias, Savias the main ingredients of performance. Googa Dhamoda a dance form starts at the beginning. With a brief introduction about the play, the performance starts. It consists mainly of mimicry, from which the name of the theater form derives (swaang means disguise or impersonation). Also featured prominently are long question and answer sessions between the actors. Much of the dialogue is improvised and the actors must be able to trade quotations, puns, proverbs and songs at the drop of a hat. There is much singing and dancing and there is always a clown character called the makhaulia (jester). Swang theatre is traditionally restricted to men, who also play the female roles, the latter often involving elaborate make-up and costumes. But female troupes are not altogether unknown.

A single presentation of swaang may continue for up to five or six hours. There is much song and music, especially the famous Haryanvi style of singing known as Raagani.

== Themes ==
Swang themes draw variously from themes of morality, folk tales, lives of inspiring personalities, stories from Indian mythology and in recent times, more current themes like health and hygiene, literacy, AIDS awareness and women's empowerment. In temple based religious theatre, Indian epics and Puranas are the major source material for characters, while the community-based secular theatre is of lighter variety. Several themes may be mixed together - mythological love, popular history, and religious themes, all with overtones of secular values. All dramas typically end with the victory of good over evil.

Popular mythological themes include Raja Vikramaditya, Ranveer- Padmavat, Jaani Chor, Prahlad Bhagat, Gopi Chand, Bharthari, Harishchander, Raja Bhoj, Kichak Badh, Draupadi Chir Haran, Jaani Chor, Pingla Bharthri and other tales from old literature. Also popular are Punjabi romances like Pooran Bhagat, Heer Ranjha, etc. Historical and semi-historical themes include Raja Rissalu, Amar Singh Rathor, Sarwar Neer, Jaswant Singh, Ramdevji, etc. Other popular tales include romances like Sorath Rai Diyach, Nihalde, Padmavat, etc.

== History ==
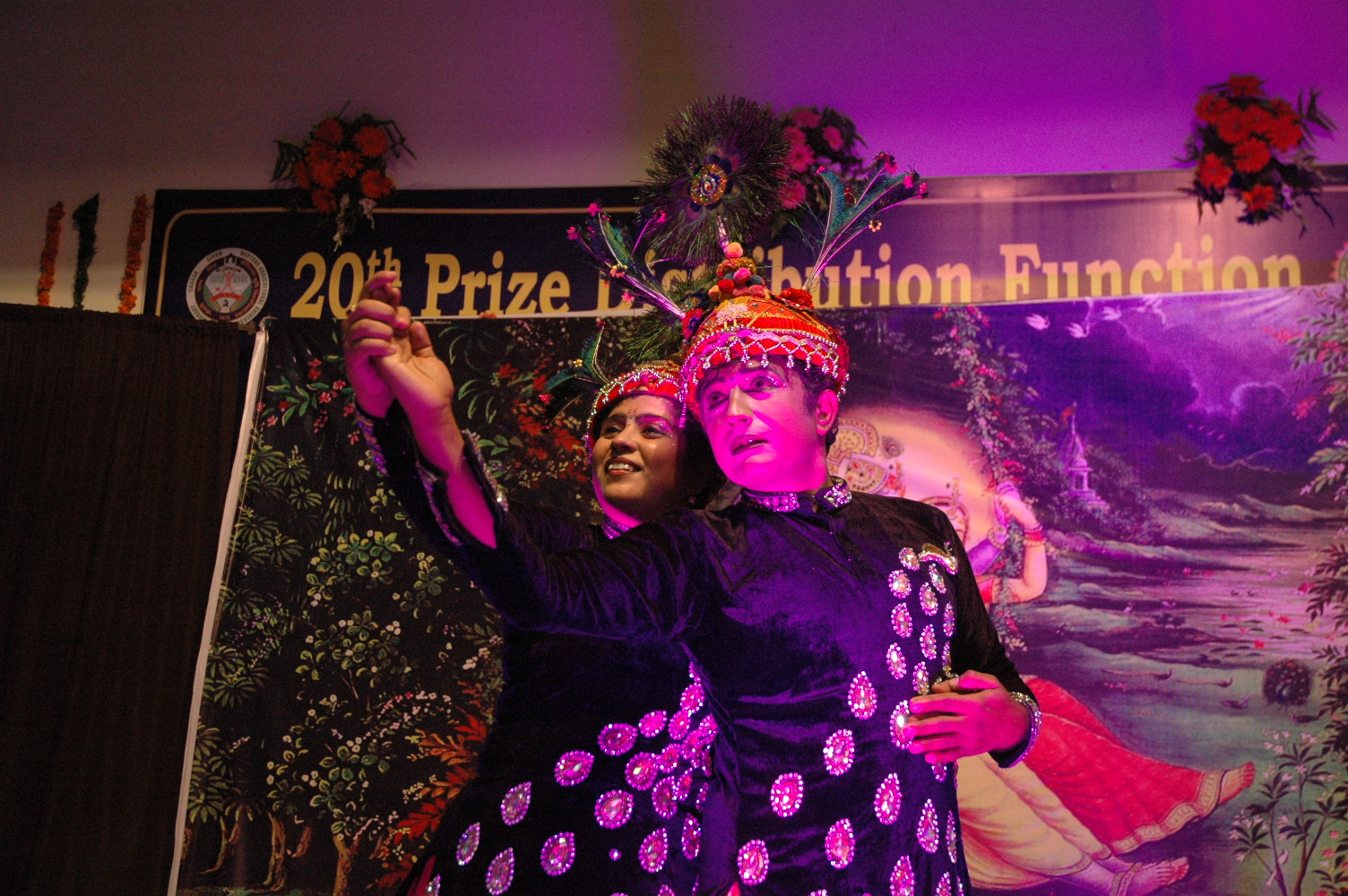
Swang Duet GOPI_UDDHAV by Dr. Sandhya Sharma and Dr. Satish Kashyap

In Haryana the most celebrated name is that of Deep Chand Bahman of village Khanda, Sonipat. He was popularly known as Shakespeare or Kalidas of Haryana. He polished the style of Ali Bux and gave a new color to this folk art. The Saang of that time had two categories: (i) Kirtan Style and (ii) Nautanki Style. Deep Chand's style of performance incorporated elements from music, dance, pantomime, versification, and ballad recitation. During the First World War, when Deep Chand's capacity for improvisation and adaptation was at its peak, the British Government made him a Rai Sahib and granted him other favours. His catchy song-compositions with martial tunes attracted large recruits to the army.

Deep Chand Bahman: ॥भर्ती होले रे, थारे बाहर खड़े रंगरूट, आड़ै मिलै पाट्या पुराणा, उड़ै मिलै फुल बूट॥

दो सौ वर्ष के बाद म्य, सांगी दीपचंद आग्या, तख़्त बिछा साजिन्दे बिठा, आसमाने तणवाग्या, देश चमोले तीन बोल के, इसे काफिये गाग्या, सरकार करै थी पूछ, दीपचंद सांगी स्याणे की, बहुत पुराणी कहाणी, सुणियो हरियाणे की, घग्गर यमना बीच की, धरती हरी समाणे की। - प. रामकिशन व्यास

एक सौ सत्तर साल बाद, फेर दीपचंद होग्या, साजिन्दे तो बणा दिये, घोड़े का नाच बंद होग्या, निच्चै काला दामण ऊपर, लाल कन्द होग्या, चमोले को भूल गये, न्यू न्यारा छन्द होग्या, तीन काफिए गाये, या बणी रंगत हाल की, हरियाणे की कहाणी सुणल्यो, दो सौ साल की, कई किस्म की हवा चालगी, ये नई चाल की। - प. मांगेराम

The origin of swang is traced to be Kishan Lal Bhaat, who some two hundred years ago is said to have laid the foundation of the present style of folk theatre. Another view gives credit for this to Kavi Shankar Dass, a poet artiste, who belonged to Meerut. Another notable early pioneer was Ali Bux of Rewari, who successfully staged plays titled Fasanai, Azad and Padmawat. For music and song, these early Swaang drew on khayals and chambolas. The stage was most elementary, the actors performed from a central place among the audience. The light was provided by mashals (Roman torches).

There are six major Lok Kavi who puts the Haryanvi Culture at the Peak.

- Pt Deep Chand Bahman
- Pt Lakhmi Chand
- Jat Mehar Singh
- Baje Bhagat
- Pt Mange Ram
- Pt Ramkishan Vyas

Pt. Ramkishan Vyas of Narnaund (Hissar), formerly known as 'Vyas ji', is a celebrity in the field of Haryanvi Saangs and Raagnis. He invented various concepts in presenting the raagnis to the public e.g. Soni and others. In addition, he has been deputed as Counseller and Consultants by Rohtak Aakashvani & Kurukshetra Aakashvani. Haryana Government has also declared that the dominant universities of Haryana (Kurukshetra University, Maharishi Dayanand University, etc.) would include his autobiography and raagnis in their curriculum.In 1998, The Government of India has honored this renowned poet by the award from Rohtak Aakashwani for his incredible support to the rise of Haryanvi Lok Sahitya.His younger son, Satyanarayan Shastri is also continuing their task to rise the Haryanvi Lok Sahitya by his writing. Satyanarayan Shastri is a singer of 'Ragnis' at aakashvani since 1983.

Pt Surya Bhanu Shastri his disciple Dr Satish Kashyap and Dr Sandhya Sharma though belongs to Pt Lakhmi Chand gharana and staged major Swangs/saangs like Padmavat, Kichak Draupadi, Phool Singh Nautani and famous Jaani Chor but had performed in every major Gharanas breaking the orthodox Parnali/Gharana divided on the base of Brahmin/ Non- Brahmin, Caste and region based.

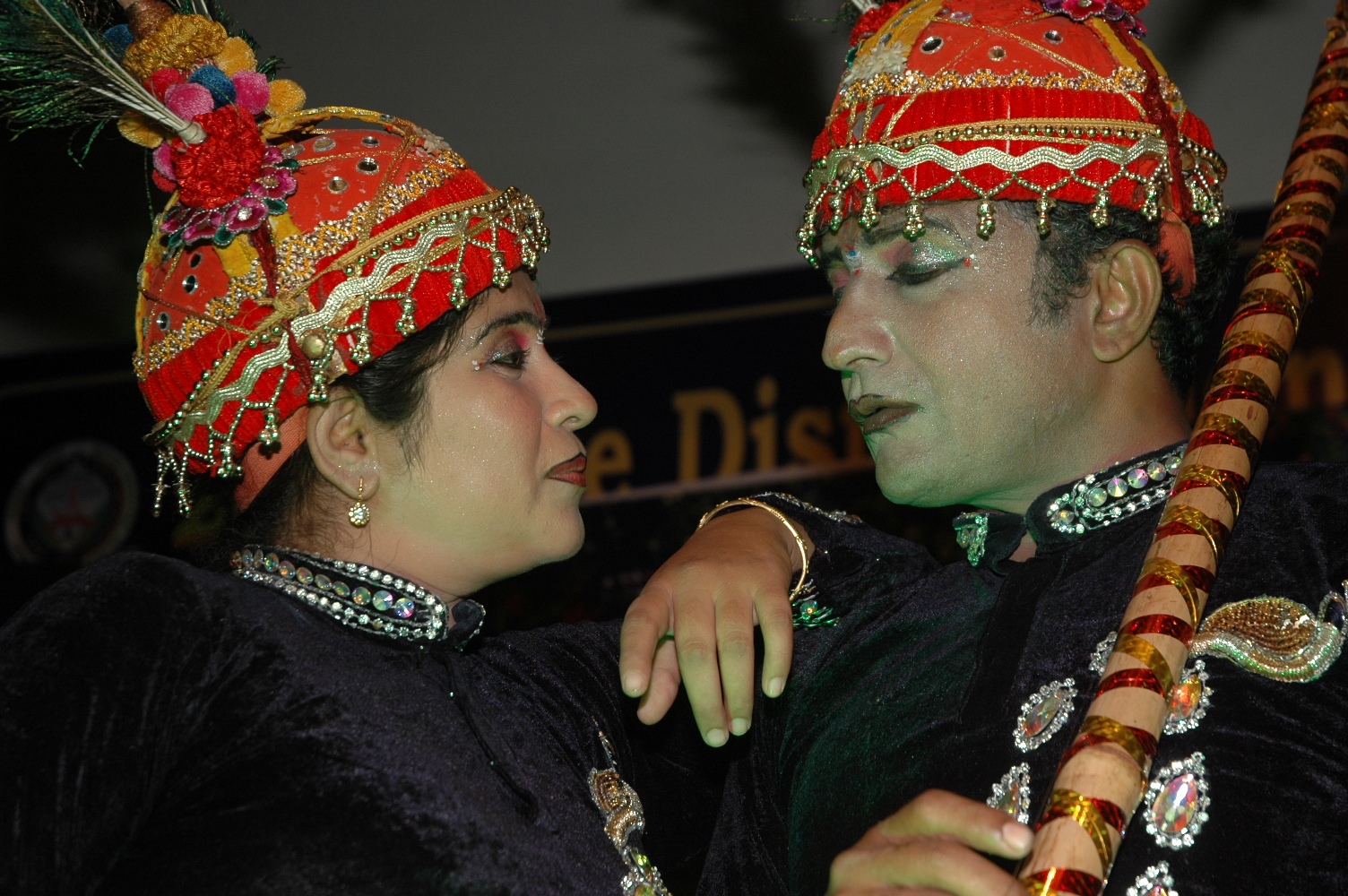
Swang Performance by Dr. Sandhya Sharma and Dr. Satish Kashyap

Hardeva polished his Chambola style and made some changes to Haryanvi ragni (folk song). Bjae Nai, a disciple of Hardeva, mixed both the styles of folk music. Pt. Nathu Ram, another well known Swaangi coached a number of talented pupils, which included Maan Singh, Bulli, Dina Lohar and Ram Singh. Anoop Lather a well known theatre person introduced Swang in Kurukshetra University and organised Swang Youth festivals and first time produced Swang Jaani Chor in proscenium with Satish Kashyap in 1999. Manish Joshi Bismil who is a noted theatre director of India belongs to Hisar is also known for developing Swang in Haryana. In year 2012 his recent production Lakhmiprem was a milestone work on Pandit Lakhmichand. Manish Joshi is recipient of Ustaad Bismillah Khan Yuva Puraskar by Sangeet Natak Akademi. He is working on Pandit Mangeram'

Dr. Satish Kashyap and Dr. Sandhya Sharma in the able guidance of Pandit Suraj Bhan Shastri, a disciple of Pt. Lakhmi Chand had done revolutionary changes in Swang performance. Revival of Swang traditions is utmost need to oxygen to the dying art. Dr Satish Kashyap, an internationally acclaimed Swang artist, is leading the only surviving Mandali of Swang. He performs both in Operatic as well as proscenium stage. They performed at National and International levels viz. National School of Drama (NSD), New Delhi and in SPIC MACAY International Convention at IIT, Mumbai. They were selected in prestigious "BHARANGAM" organised by National School of Drama, New Delhi. CCS Haryana Agricultural University, Hisar in leadership of Dr. Satish Kashyap, also set up a unit for the promotion and preservation of Swang and produced and staged best productions, viz, Jaani Chor, Raja Vikramaditya, Phool Singh- Nautanki etc.

Dr. Sandhya Sharma is the sole female performer of Swang and has written and produced two new Swangs with her stage partner and mentor Dr Satish Kashyap. They are based on Mahabharata. New Swangs are GOPI-UDDAV and VEER- BARBRIK.

Towards the end of the 19th century, all-women Swaang troupes performed in western Uttar Pradesh and the adjoining Khaaddar area of Haryana. All parts in these troupes were played by women. Sardari of Kalayat (Jind), Natni of Gangaru, and Bali of Indri (Karnal) were some of the leaders of such troupes. Pandit Lakhmi Chand of Jatti Kalan (Sonipat) is known as Surya Kavi (Sun Poet) in Haryanvi Raagnis. important Swang staged by him included Nal Damyanti, Meera Bai, Satyavan Savitri, Poorjan, Seth Tara Chand, Puran Bhagat and Shashi Lakarhara. Pt. Tuleram, son of Pt Lakhmi Chand continued the tradition of performance and after him his son Vishnu is still performing in the remote villages of Haryana, Uttar Pradesh and Rajasthan.

Dr Satish Kashyap as Vikramaditya with Dr Sandhya Sharma

List of Famous Artists in Haryana

- Brahman Biharilal - 13th century
- Chetan Sharma - 13th Century
- Balmukund Gupt - 16th century
- Girdhar - 16th century
- Shivkaur - 16th century
- Kishanlal Bhat - 16th century
- Saadulla- during 1760
- Bansilal – during 1802
- Ambaram– during 1819
- Pandit Bastiram- (1841–1958)
- Ahmad Baksh-(1800–1850)
- Ali Baksh (1854–1899)
- Hiradas Udasi- during 1861
- Tau Saangi - during 1878
- Jamua Mir (1879–1959)
- Jaswant Singh Verma (1881–1957)
- Pt Deep Chand Bahman (1884–1940)
- Hardeva Swami (1884–1926)
- Man Singhingh Bahman (1885–1955)
- Pandit Mairam (1886–1964)
- Surajbhan Verma (1889–1942)
- Pandit Shadiram (1889–1973)
- Pandit Sarupchand (1890–1956)
- Pandit Netram -during 1890
- Baje Bhagat (1898–1936)
- Pandit Harikesh (1898–1954)
- Pandit Nathu Ram (1902–1990)
- Pt Lakhmi Chand (1903–1945)
- Pandit Mange Ram (1906–1967)
- Shriram Sharma (1907–1966)
- Pandit Nand Lal (1913–1963)
- Dayachand Mayna (1915–1993)
- Munshiram Jandli (1915–1950)
- Pandit Jagdish Chandra (1916–1997)
- Pandit Maichand- during 1916
- Rai Dhanpat Singh- during (1916–1979)
- Dayachand Gopal- during 1916
- Pandit Ramanand -during 1917
- Jat Mehar Singh Dahiya (1918–1944)
- Sultan Shashtri -during 1919
- Master Nekiram (1915–1996)
- Kishan Chand Sharma- during 1922
- Khem Chand Swami -during 1923
- Chandralal Bhat (1923–2004)
- Gyaniram Shahstri -during 1923
- Pandit Ramkishan (1925–2003)
- Master Dayachand (1925–1945)
- Chandgiram (1926–1991)
- Pandit Raghunath (1922–1977)
- Pandit Tejram -during 1931
- Bharat Bhushan -during 1932
- Banwari Lal Theth (1932–1983)
- Jhammanlal - 1935
- Mahashay Saruppal - (1937–2013)
- Pandit Jagannath - during 1939
- Pandit Tuleram - (1939–2008)
- Ranbir Dahiya - during 1950
- Chaturbhuj Bansal - during 1951

== See also ==
- Indian musical instruments
- List of Indian folk dances
- List of Haryanvi-language films
- Music of Haryana
- Haryanvi cinema
- Hindi Cinema
