= Mayna, Rohtak =

Village in Haryana, India

Mayna
- Village
- Mayna, Rohtak
- Interactive map of Mayna
- Country: India
- State: Haryana
- Region: Rohtak division
- District: Rohtak district
- Time zone: UTC+5:30 (IST)
- Postal Code: 124021

Maina is the first village en route to Jhajjar, on the Rohtak-Jhajjar road, situated 5 km from Rohtak. It is governed by the Rohtak district administration.

== Demographics ==
As per the Census of India, 2011, Maina village has a total population of 4599 of which 2467 are Males and 2132 are Females; people aged 0–6 is 533, making up 11.59% of the total population of the village; sex ratio is 864 females per 1000 males, which is lower than the state average of 879 females per 1000 males; child sex ratio is 825 females for 1000 males, which is lower than the state average of 834 females for 1000 males.

In 2011, the literacy rate of Maina village was 80.79% as against the state average of 75.55% with male literacy at 90.67% and female literacy rate was 69.43%.

== Temples ==
Mayna has two major temples, one temple of Lord Shiva and the other of Lord Hanuman, with the latter located on NH-17 itself. The temple for Lord Hanuman offers free accommodation for pilgrims to Vaishno Devi or visitors to Balaji Dham.

== Economy ==
The economy of the village is primarily centred around agriculture and dairy farming. Wheat, paddy and milk are the major contributors to the above-mentioned sector.

The non-agricultural economy is driven by small scale industries producing earthen pots, pediatric shoes and a cloth dyeing industry in the region.

== Topography and planning ==
The region within and surrounding the village is planned and since its origin has an ordered structure.

The region is surrounded by ponds which prevents the village from flooding and provides easy access to potable water source. The village is rich in wetlands, dense plants and free plains.

Village energy needs are fulfilled by state board electricity supply and from local fuel stations. Rooftop solar systems are getting more popular; the village capacity of solar power production is estimated at several hundred kW of electricity. The village yet has not planned solid waste management.

== Flora and fauna ==
In the village, migratory birds can be seen around ponds during winter, and snakes are present in kawala and barali areas. The flora in the village was of sub tropical trees. On the northern and southern sides were two small forests while in eastern and western sides was the cultivated land. On the far western end sand deposits could be seen. A variety of bushes and sheesham trees were in abundance. After approaching canals wetland area increased. Now the wetland weeds are in abundance. Efforts of revival of northern forest were made in June 2020 when herbal trees were planted densely. The village temple has a herbal garden with about 65 types of herbal trees. A garden has also been planted around Richhala Shiv Mandir.

== Notable people ==
- Amit Panghal International Boxer, World Ranking -1, India's First Boxer who got silver medal in World Boxing Championship.
- Dayachand Mayna, Historical poet - written Raagni like as "Paani aali paani paya de"

== Adjacent villages ==
- Dighal
- Karontha
