= Ramesh Kumar Yadava =

Indian education administrator

Prof. Ramesh Kumar Yadava
- Incumbent
- Assumed office June 2021

Personal details
- Born: Ramesh; 1953 (age 72–73) Rewari, India
- Education: Chaudhary Charan Singh Haryana Agricultural University
- Occupation: Vice-chancellor

Ramesh Kumar Yadava is the vice chancellor of Baba Mast Nath University (BMU), Rohtak, Haryana, India.

== Career ==
He joined BMU in 2021. Previously he has worked as Professor & Head, Forage Section (Genetics & Plant Breeding), and member of board of management in (HAU Hisar), Chaudhary Charan Singh Haryana Agricultural University (1976-2013). He retired from HAU Hisar on 31 July 2013 after serving there for 37 years. He has also worked as chairman, Haryana Kisan Ayog and Agricultural Cost Price Commission. He is member of executive council of Sikkim University nominated by visitor of the central universities of India President of India Sh. Ram Nath Kovind.
