= Manish Joshi Bismil =

Indian theatre director

Manish Joshi Bismil is an Indian theatre actor, director, puppeteer and magician. He completed a one-year diploma course at the Himachal Cultural Research Forum and Theatre Academy. He has directed more than 35 full-length play including Aadhe Adhoorey by Mohan Rakesh, Nagmandal by Girish Karnad, Andhay Yug by Dharamvir Bharti. He has also written eight full-length plays, out of them six have been staged successfully. His play Hum to aise hi hain has been staged more than 108 times in India and in Lahore. In year 2016 he conceptualized and implemented Haryana's Biggest Theatre Festival Rang Aangan National Puppet & Theatre Festival. The festival was of 21 days from 1–21 December 2016. He is also a visiting faculty at HCRFTA, Madhya Pradesh Natya Vidalya, Bhopal. He is also a recipient of Ustad Bismillah Khan award by Sangeet Natak Academy. His play Patloon was specially invited in 8th Theatre Olympics. He is the first director of India who directed a play on Guru Nanak Dev Ji in Kissagoi form titled as Satnam waheguru. He is the man who started Theatre on Bikes in association with Jindal stainless limited which happened first time in the history of Indian Theatre.

== See also ==
- List of people from Haryana
