= Dhulawat =

Village in Haryana, India

- Location in Haryana, India Dhulawat (India)
- Coordinates: 28°12′38″N 77°00′28″E
- Country: India
- State: Haryana
- District: Nuh

Government
  - Body: Gram Panchayats
- Elevation: 188 m (617 ft)

Population (2011)
  - Total: 2,867

Languages
  - Official: Hindi
- Time zone: UTC+5:30 (IST)
- PIN: 122103
- ISO 3166 code: IN-HR
- Vehicle registration: HR-93
- Website: mewat.gov.in

Dhulawat is a village near the Nuh district in the Mewat Taoru block of Haryana. Its PIN code is 122103.
