= Alhar Bikaneri =

Indian Urdu poet

Alhar Bikaneri (born Shyamlal Sharma 17 May 1937 - 17 June 2009) also spelled Alhad Bikaneri was and Indian poet who wrote Hindi Hasya Ras (humorous poetry) and Urdu poetry. His original name was Shyamlal Sharma. He was born in the village of Bikaner, Rewari district, Haryana, India.

== Awards and recognition ==
Bikaneri was known for his musical style of poetry recitation and his use of chhand kavita (metrical verse). He was conferred the title Hasya Ratna. His other honours included the Theetoli Award, Delhi (1981); Kaka Hathrasi Award (1986); Akhil Bharatiya Nagrik Parishad honour (1993); Yatha-Sambhav Award, Ujjain (1997); Kavya Gaurav Award, Delhi (1998); Narendra Mohan Award; Manas Award (2000); Tepa Award, Ujjain (2004); Vyangya Shri Award (2004); and Athahaas Shikhar Award (2007).

In 1996, Bikaneri’s work was recognized by the then president of India, Shankar Dayal Sharma. The Government of Delhi presented him with the Kaka Hathrasi Samman in 2000, while the Government of Haryana conferred the Haryana Gaurav Award on him in 2004.

The Haryana Sahitya Akademi later established the annual Aditya-Alhar Hasya Samman under its Sahityakar Samman Yojana to recognize contributions to literature. First presented in 2012, the award carries a cash prize of ₹100,000.

== Life ==
Bikaneri was born on 17 May 1937 in the village of Bikaner in Rewari district, Haryana. He was the only son of Chuutanlal Sharma and Parvati Devi. He developed an interest in music, literature and stage performances during childhood, although his father wanted him to become an engineer.

Bikaneri completed the tenth grade with a first-division result and received a scholarship. He subsequently enrolled in the science stream at Ahir College in Rewari but left after his second year without completing his studies.

In December 1955, Bikaneri began working at the Custodian Office in Gurgaon, where he remained until March 1956. The following month, he joined the Telegraph Training Centre in Saharanpur. He later contracted malaria & typhoid and was treated ay Irwin Hospital in Delhi, where he recovered.

== Death and commemoration ==
Bikaneri died on 17 June 2009, aged 72, after experiencing respiratory problems. He had been admitted to a hospital in Noida, Uttar Pradesh.

His family and associates subsequently organized events commemorating him around the anniversary of his birth. In 2010, a memorial Kavi sammelan was held at which participating poets dedicated recitations to him.

In 2011, on what would have been Bikaneri’s 74th birthday, Haryana chief minister Bhupinder Singh Hooda released his final book, A Mast Hua, at Haryana Bhawan in New Delhi. His 75th birth anniversary was commemorated in 2012 with an Akhil Bharatiya Kavi Sammelan at the LTG Auditorium. Organized by the Haryana Sahitya Akademi and Chetna India, the event was attended by the speaker of the Delhi Legislative Assembly, government ministers and poets.

== Poems ==
Writing about Bikaneri’s work, Devendra Arya linked his work to “a ray of light in darkness” and praised his ability to express pain and sorrow through comedy in direct and powerful manner without causing offense.

On January 23 1971, Bikaneri participated in the Lal Qila Kavi sammelan for the first time and recited his poem.

=== Influences ===
In 1962, Bikaneri began his literary career as a ghazal writer under the pen name of Mahir Bikaneri. At the time he was employed as a clerk the General Post Office in Kashmiri Gate, Delhi. While at work, he wrote his first humorous poem, Afsar Ji ki Amar Kahani. Which was well received by his colleagues.

Around 1967, inspired by the works of Kaka Hathrasi, Bikaneri began experimenting with humorous poetry. After hearing several of his poems, his friends and fellow poet Shayar Razaa Amrohi encouraged him to write Hindi comic verse. Reading Kaka Hathrasi’s book Kaka Ki Phuljhariya further influenced his decision to stop writing serious songs and ghazals and concentrate on humorous poetry. He subsequently adopted the pen name Alhar Bikaneri.

In 1968, Bikaneri’s friend Krish Swarup introduced him to the poet Gopal Prasad Vyas at Vyas’s residence in Bhagirath Palace, Delhi. After hearing his poetry, Vyas advised him to study literature extensively and develop an original style. Bikaneri devoted the following two years to literary study and improving his writing. In 1970, Vyas accepted him as a student. In November of that year, Bikaneri accompanied Vyas to Kolkata, where the relationship was formalized through a traditional ceremony. On 3 January 1971, Bikaneri participated in the Lal Qila Kavi Sammelan for the first time.

Religious and philosophical themes appeared in many of Bikaneri’s poems. His father died when Bikaneri was 22 years old, leaving him a musical instrument and several religious and philosophical books, including the Ramayana, Gita-Manthan, Gandhi-Manthan, Gandhi Vani, Buddha Vani and Tamil Ved.

In February 1970, while reading one of these books, Bikaneri encountered a line attributed to the Urdu poet Nazeer Akbarabadi: “Poore hain wahi mard, jo har haal mein khush hain.” Inspired by this line, he wrote the poem Har Haal Mein Khush Hain, which was later included in his book Amin Mast Hua. The poem emphasizes patience, resilience and contentment in difficult circumstances, encouraging readers to face life’s challenges and value what they have.

=== Published ===
Bikaneri’s poems were published in several magazines. Har Haal Mein Khush Hain was his first poem to appear in the weekly magazine Saptahik Hindustan, which subsequently published several more of his works. Bikaneri credited the magazine’s editor, Manohar Shyam Joshi, with providing him a platform through which his poetry reached a nationwide audience. Within two years, he had gained recognition as a Hindi poet.

His poems include Hasya Qawwali–Moongphali, Vote Maangne Nikle Netaji, Market Value, Har Haal Mein Khush Hain, Anpadh Dhanno, Ghat-Ghat Ghoome and Chunav Ghoshna Patra.

== Other work ==
Apart from writing ghazals and poems, he also worked for cinema. In 1986 he had written the story, script, and songs for a regional Haryana Language movie named Choti Saali. He regularly used to recite poems from Akashvaani (India Radio Service) & Doordarshan (India TV Service). His poems were regularly printed in newspapers & Hindi magazines. He wrote many books. The most popular of them were Bhaj Pyare Tu Sita Raam, Ghaat-Ghaat Ghoome, Abhi Hasta Hun, Ab Toh Aansso Paunch, Bhaisa Peewae Somras, Thaath Ghazal ke, Unchuae Haath, Jai Madam Ki Bol Re, Har Haal Mai Khush Hai, Khol Na Dena Dwar, and Mun Mast Hua.
