= Baje Bhagat =

Baje Bhagat (16 July 1898 – 26 February 1939) was an Indian litterateur, poet, ragni writer, saang artist and Haryanvi cultural show artist. He was born in Sisana, Rohtak District, Punjab (now Sonipat District, Haryana).

== Biography ==
Bhagat was born on 16 July 1898 in Sisana Village of Sonipat District of the erstwhile Punjab Province (now in Haryana). He wrote 15 to 20 works that gave him unusual recognition in Haryana in the early 1920s. He was stabbed to death while sleeping outdoors.

== Writings ==
Bhagat's writings include:-

- Yaa Lage Bhaanji teri (या लगै भाणजी तेरी / बाजे भगत)
- Laad karan lagi maat (लाड करण लगी मात, पूत की कौळी भरकै / बाजे भगत)
- saachi baat kahan menh (साची बात कहण म्हं सखी होया करै तकरार / बाजे भगत)
- Dhan maya ke baare menh (धन माया के बारे म्हं किसे बिरले तै दिल डाट्या जा सै / बाजे भगत)
- Bipta ke menh firun jhaadti (बिपता के म्हं फिरूं झाड़ती घर-घर के जाळे / बाजे भगत)
- Main nirdhan kangaal aadmi (मैं निर्धन कंगाल आदमी तूं राजा की जाइ / बाजे भगत)
- Bera na kad darshan honge (बेरा ना कद दर्शन होंगे पिया मिलन की लागरही आस / बाजे भगत)

== See also ==
- Dayachand Mayna
- Lakhmi Chand
- Music of Haryana
- Haryanvi cinema
- List of Haryanvi-language films
