= Nanu Singh Saini =

Sardar Nanu Singh Saini was a Sikh army general and a well-known jagirdar in Phulkian riyasat. He was a close associate of Maharaja Ala Singh who founded the Patiala state in 1753 AD.

He gained this jagir from Maharaja Ala Singh as a recognition and reward for having liberated him from the Sunam prison in 1747 where he had been incarcerated by Ali Muhammad Khan for over two years.

== Grant of Jagir in 1753 AD ==
Ala Singh was liberated by Nanu Singh Saini with the help of Karam Singh Semeka in 1747 AD. Thereafter, he went on to found Patiala princely state in 1753 and took the title of Maharaja. Nanu Singh Saini became among his most trusted lieutenants and army generals. As a reward of Nanu Singh Saini's help in his liberation from the prison and his contributions in military campaigns as a general, his family was granted a large jagir which was spread in Patiala, Jind and Ambala regions. Along with Chahal Sardars of Patiala, this Saini family's estates in Patiala were the largest territories that any noble family owned in Phulkian riyasat. Nanu Singh Saini's family was also known as 'Wade Ghar Wale' in the Phulkian court because they had been granted a sprawling 1-acre (4,000 m^{2}) bungalow at Der Sodhian by the ruling family.

Following is the complete list of estates owned by Nanu Singh Saini's jagirdar family and his descendants:

- 6500 Bigha - Ratanheri (Patiala)
- 6000 Bigha - Sanianheri (Patiala)
- 2500 Bigha - Barnala
- 5000 Bigha - Bhagwanpur (Ambala)
- 6000 Bigha - Jainagar (Rajpura)- named after Sardar Jai Singh Saini of Phulkian royal court.
- 130 Bigha - Raipur (Chamkaur Sahib)
- 150 Bigha - Devinagar (Patiala)
- 200 Bigha - Budhanpur (Patiala)

== Conquest of Sirhind ==
In 1763 AD Maharaja Ala Singh and Nanu Singh Saini together conquered Sirhind from Zain Khan and annexed it into Phulkian state.

== Family and descendants ==
Nanu Singh Sainis's family and descendants played important role in the religious and political affairs of the Phulkian state. Four of his lineal descendants, namely, Sardar Jai Singh Saini, Sardar Sujan Singh Saini, Sardar Kishan Singh Saini, and Sardar Pritam Singh Saini were closely associated with the royal court of Phulkian state.

Sardar Jai Singh Saini was a renowned poet and highly regarded advisor of Maharaja Karam Singh, Ala Singh's son. His poetic anthology 'Boop Bhookhan' was authored by him to extol ancient Indian spiritual lore and guide Maharaja Karam Singh in the state affairs.

== See also ==
- Ajit Saini of Punjab, India (Freedom fighter and an acclaimed writer and columnist, also a close lieutenant of Subhas Chandra Bose)
- Sangat Singh Saini (General in the army of Maharaja Ranjit Singh in the Sikh Empire, also rewarded 300 acres land for bravery in battle)
