= Thali (percussion) =

The thali is a percussion instrument of the family of idiophones used in Indian folk music. It is a round, flat metal platter used in cuisine that is beaten with a stick if it is held with the other hand, or beaten with two sticks if it is placed on the floor or on a stand. The thali frequently accompanies the dhol or maddal drum in various dances.
