= Murari Lal Sharma (Neeras) =

Murari Lal Sharma Neeras

Murari Lal Sharma (nom de plume, "Neeras") (b. 19 September 1936) is an Indian author and poet.

== Biography ==
Sharma was born in the village of Koka, in the district of Rohtak, in the state of Haryana in India. He is an alumnus of Ahir College Rewari. Following his college education, his interest in Ayurvedic medicine led him to obtain a degree in the subject as an Ayurveda Ratan.

Initially an educator, Sharma was employed with the Delhi government as a "Special Grade Teacher" until his retirement in 1995.

== Writings and poetry ==
Sharma has produced both original works and translations of religious texts.

His translations include Neeras ki Shri Durga Upasana, translating the Hindu religious text Shri Durga Saptashati into Hindi verses, and Neeras ki Shri Gita, which similarly translates the Hindu religious text Shreemad Bhagwad Geeta.

His poetry includes works such as O Deepak Tum Jalte Rahna! and Desh Ko Naveen Tyaag Chaahiye!

Sharma is also a children's author, producing both original poetry and translations of famous English-language stories and poems for a younger audience, such as a translation of The Arab and His Camel.
