= K. C. Yadav =

Indian historian (1936–2021)

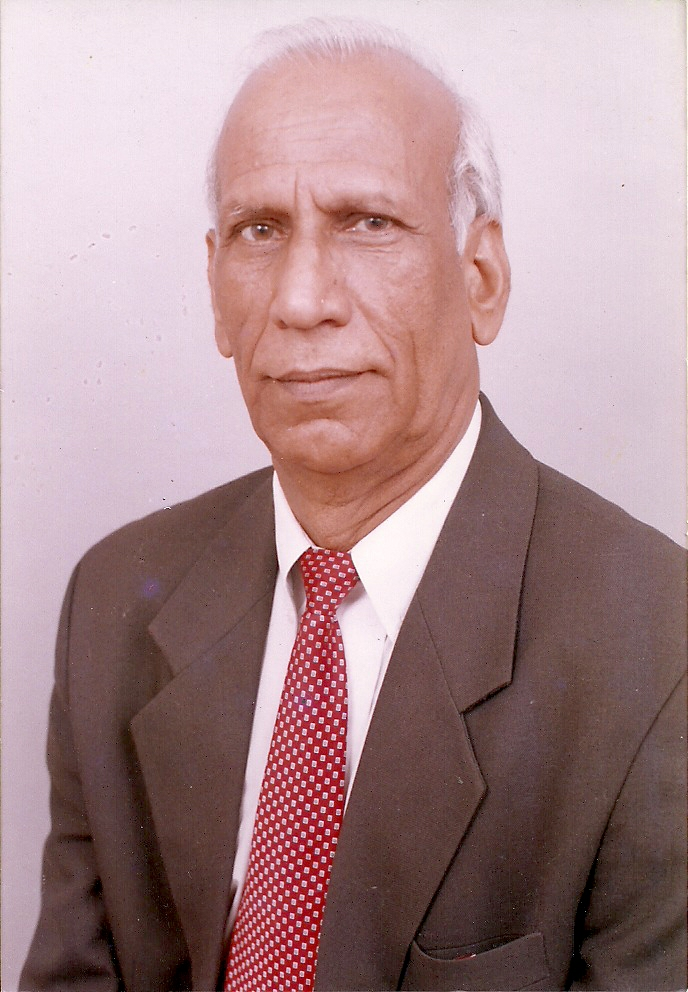
- Born: Kripal Chandra Yadav; 11 October 1936; Rewari, India
- Died: 27 May 2021 (aged 84)
- Occupations: Academic, historian
- Awards: Fellow of the Royal Asiatic Society of Great Britain and Ireland, 1974

Academic background
- Education: M.A., PhD. history
- Alma mater: Rajasthan University

Academic work
- Discipline: History
- Sub-discipline: Modern Indian history, colonial Indian history, history of Haryana
- Institutions: Tokyo University of Foreign Studies Japan, Haryana Academy of History and Culture, Kurukshetra University

Kripal Chandra Yadav (11 October 1936 – 27 May 2021) was an Indian historian of modern and colonial Indian history.

== Life and career ==
In 1974, Yadav was elected a Fellow of the Royal Asiatic Society of Great Britain and Ireland (FRAS). From 1980 to 1981, he was a visiting professor at the Tokyo University of Foreign Studies in Japan. Coming from Haryana, Yadav had particular interest in the region. He was the founder and editor of the Journal of Haryana Studies, and the founding director of the Haryana Academy of History and Culture where he held office until November 2014. He was part of the United Service Institution's project India and the Great War 1914-18.

== Academic works ==
On the Revolt of 1857: One of Yadav's earliest contributions pertained to the 1857 mutiny and the struggle by the Indian Princely states as well as Indian sepoys against the rule of the East India Company. Punjab was traditionally considered to have a pacifist role in the struggle. Yadav presented an argument that stated otherwise. Citing evidence from the mutiny records relating to Ambala, Yadav argued that the revolt first broke out in Ambala, and not Meerut. In a letter that R. C. Majumdar wrote to Yadav, he said, "...the most important article is on the Mutiny at Ambala. That there was an open revolt of the sepoys there on the morning of 10 May, before the outbreak at Meerut, is, I must confess, a news to me and probably to many others. I congratulate you..." Yadav has further written on the role of Himachal Pradesh and Haryana. In 2008, Yadav was a speaker at the National Conference on the 1857 Revolt organised by Kurukshetra University and the Indian Council of Historical Research. He has also placed emphasis on the role of Rao Tula Ram.

On Bhagat Singh: Bhagat Singh, a revolutionary of the Indian independence movement, was one of Yadav's chief focuses of interest. Yadav has produced ten volumes on him. In an interview to the national daily The Hindu, Yadav said, "Nobody has tried to understand his ideology and its relevance today. Part of the problem is his writings have been scattered and most of the published work on him is in the vernacular. No doubt the films that have been made on him have succeeded in taking him to the masses but here again the scripts lacked authenticity. That's why we undertook a thorough research and chose English as the medium." In his works, Yadav argues against the revolutionary's supposed "confusion" and has discussed Singh's ideology, tracing his transition from a Gandhian to a socialist revolutionary. Speaking to The Tribune, Yadav said, "Bhagat Singh [...] had the potential of becoming a world leader and this is no exaggeration."

On the First World War: In recent years, Yadav has worked on the involvement of Indian soldiers in the First World War, focusing mainly on Haryana and Punjab. He was part of the United Service Institution's project India and the Great War 1914-18. Yadav has focused on the recruitment of Indian soldiers, the social and economic implications of the war, and its impact. He examined letters from these soldiers for his research. Yadav explains one of the tactics used for recruitment of soldiers was to shame the young men in front of the village's women, thus forcing their enlistment. Yadav argues that despite the totalitarian nature of the "Great War", the experience of the war brought about prosperity in these regions as "the soldiers returning after WWI started to buy land with the money they made abroad". Speaking to the Sunday Guardian, he further explained, "The exposure to France, England and the other modern societies of Europe led them to question our condition [...] Even while they were still on the frontlines, they began to work to bring education, equality, cleanliness and hygiene to their villages."

Yadav died in 2021. His book, The Sovereign, Subject and Colonial Justice Revisiting the Trial of Bahadur Shah, 1858, was published posthumously in 2022 by Routledge.

== Bibliography ==
Selected works:

- Yadav, Kripal Chandra (1977). The revolt of 1857 in Haryana. New Delhi: Manohar Book Service. OCLC 3478854.
- Yadav, Kripal Chandra; Arya, Krishan Singh (1988). Arya Samaj and the freedom movement. New Delhi: Manohar Publications. ISBN 978-81-85054-41-4. OCLC 18681865.
- Yadav, Kripal Chandra; Singh, Rajbir (1994). India's unequal citizens: a study of other backward classes. New Delhi: Manohar. ISBN 978-81-7304-069-6. OCLC 34374935.
- Yadav, Kripal Chandra (1968). Haryana: studies in history and culture. Kurukshetra: Kurukshetra University. OCLC 28020.
- Yadav. K.C. (1988). Arya Samaj and the Freedom Movement: vol. 1: 1875-1918. Manohar Publishers and Distributors. ISBN 8185054428
- Yadav, K.C., (2000). Ahirwal : Ithas Evam Sanskriti (Hindi). Hope India Publications. ISBN 8189073052
- Yadav, K.C. (2001). Beyond the Mud Walls: Indian Social Realities. Hope India Publications. ISBN 8178710013
- Yadav, K.C.; Sharma S.R. (2002). Maharana Pratap : A Biography. Hope India Publications. ISBN 817871003X
- Yadav, K.C. (2002). Chaudhari Devi Lal: A Political Biography. Hope India Publications. ASIN B007NPSX2W
- Yadav, K.C. (2002). Modern Haryana: History and Culture. Manohar Publishers and Distributors. ISBN 817304371X
- Yadav, K.C. (2003). Modern Haryana: History and Culture, Volume II . Manohar Publishers and Distributors. ISBN 8173040117
- Yadav, K.C. (2005). Bhagat Singh, Why I am an Atheist: An Autobiographical Discourse. Hope India Publications. ASIN B006WXT8ZC
- Yadav, K.C. (2007). Rao Tula Ram : A Biography. National Book Trust India. ISBN 8123750846
- Yadav, K.C. (2011). 1857 the Role of Punjab Haryana and Himachal Pradesh. National Book Trust India. ISBN 978-8123752778

Edited works

- Yadav, K.C., ed. (1987). The Autobiography of Dayanand Saraswati. Manohar Publishers and Distributors. ISBN 8185054312
- Yadav, K.C., ed. (1996). The Crisis in India, Reflections of Sir Chhoturam. Hope India Publications. ASIN B006LFQ7X2
- Yadav, K.C., ed. (2001). From Periphery to Centre Stage: Ambedkar, Ambedkarism and Dalit Future. Manohar Publishers and Distributors. ISBN 8173042764
- Yadav, K.C.; Seki, Akiko ed. (2003). Subhash Chandra Bose: The Last Days. Hope India Publications. ISBN 817871017X
- Yadav, K.C. (2004). Maulana Abul Kalam Azad: Chuninda Lekh Aur Abhibhashan. Anamika Publishers. ISBN 8179750779
- Yadav, K.C., Singh, Babar ed. (2007). Bhagat Singh - The Ideas on Freedom, Liberty and Revolution: Jail Notes of a Revolutionary. Hope India Publications. ISBN 8178710560
- Yadav, K.C., ed. (2008). Mohammad Ali Khan An Autobiographical Discourse. Hope India Publications. ASIN B0073C0Q3E
