= Khatiwas =

Khatiwas Khatiwas
- Village
- Location within Haryana Location within India
- Coordinates: 28.6281511°N 76.5953278°E
- Country: India
- State: Haryana
- District: Jhajjar

Government
  - Type: Local government
  - Body: Gram Panchayat

Population (2011)
  - Total: 3,234

Languages
  - Official: Hindi, English, Haryanvi
- Time zone: UTC+5:30 (IST)
- PIN: 124103
- Area code: IN-HR
- Vehicle registration: HR
- Website: haryana.gov.in

Khatiwas is a village in Jhajjar District of Haryana, India. It is one of 264 villages and five tehsils. It's 5 kilometres (3.1 mi) from the main Jhajjar city. The village is situated on the national highway (NH 334-b) main road from Jhajjar to Charki Dadri. The village is dominated by the Ahir clan and by the Sanwalodia Gotra. This village is known for its religious devotion to Dada Siraj Wala (a saint) for generations.

The village has an area of 587 hectares. In 2011, it contained 632 households accommodating a population of 3,234 (1,722 males and 1,512 females).

Prof. J.P. Yadav, an eminent Indian biologist and professor of genetics, is from this village.

== Nearby villages ==
- Kheri Khummar 3 kilometres (1.9 mi)
- Talao 3 kilometres (1.9 mi)
- Dhaur 3 kilometres (1.9 mi)
- M P Majra 3 kilometres (1.9 mi)
- Gwalison 4 kilometres (2.5 mi)
