= Nihal Singh Takshak =

Indian politician

Nihal Singh Takshak was a politician from the village of Bhagwi, Punjab (now in Haryana), India. In 1939 he founded the Jind State Praja Mandal political party. He was first MLA from Jind following the election of 1937. He was also an Education Inspector with Birla Institute Pilani. He starting Basic Education school with help of Birla Trust in every village of Luharu- Jind state now district Bhiwani.

Having served as a minister in the government of Jind, Takshak was involved in the wrangling that resulted from the formation in 1948 of the short-lived state known as the Patiala and East Punjab States Union (PEPSU). There were three organisations vying to hold the reins of power, being the Akali Dal, Lok Sewak Dal and the Praja Mandal. The latter suffered from internal rivalries and Takshak – along with Zail Singh, Seth Ram Nath and Harcharan Singh – were encouraged to split from it by forming the Pepsu Pradesh Congress Committee. They entered the government of Gian Singh Rarewala, which was sworn in on 13 January 1949. He became Education and Finance minister for the new state. Later, in 1953, he was among a group of MLAs who rebelled against the Indian National Congress government of Raghbir Singh, causing it to collapse and Rarewala once again to assume power. The Hindu has said that he was the first example of a politician changing allegiance in India. The action was later to stigmatise him.

He founded Birhi teacher training school and Art craft teacher training in Arya Hindi Maha Vidyalaya Charkhi Dadri.

A statue in his honour was unveiled at Bhagwi in 2007.
