= Lakhmi Chand =

Indian poet

- Born: Janti Kalan, Sonipat, Haryana
- Occupations: Author; poet
- Writing career
- Language: Haryanvi language

Lakhmi Chand (1903–1945), also known as Suryakavi Pandit Lakhmi Chand, was an Indian poet of Haryanvi language. He was given the title 'Pandit'. He was also known as the Kalidas of Haryana. He has been accorded the honor of the 'Surya Har' of Haryanvi music genre Raagni and Saang. He is popularly referred to as 'Dada Lakhmi Chand'. His work is filled with songs containing messages on moral values, which earned him respect in all corners of Haryana.

Recently, the movie Dada Lakhmi which portrays the life story of Pandit Lakhmi Chand was released. It was directed by Yashpal Sharma.

== Early life ==
"Lakhmi Chand was born in Janti Kalan(in 1903), a village in the Sonepat district of Haryana, to a family of Gaur Brahmin farmers. He was determined to pursue a career in the arts despite opposition from his family. While he was not formally educated, he is widely considered one of the greatest poets in the Haryanvi language. His main disciples were Pandit Mangeram Susana and Mehar Singh Barona.

He would sing stories with moral messages in his 'Raagni' performances, and often used skits called Saang to convey messages about living a good life. His widely popular work, 'Lakhmichand Ka Brahmgyaan,' has been performed by many Haryanvi artists since his death. Through his performances, he entertained and educated people in their native language.

== Writings ==
His writings have marked influence on contemporary culture and the society of Haryana. Annually, Haryana Kala Parishad confers Pandit Lakhmi Chand Award to people for their contributions to Haryanvi literature.

Pandit Lakhmi Chand made the following Saangs:

1) Raja Harishchander

2) Shahi Lakadhara

3) Jyani Chor

4) Seth Tarachand

5) Satyewan Savitri

6) Heer Ranjha

7) Chap Singh Somwati

8) Raja Gopichand

9) Bhup Puranjan

10) Meera Bai

11) Bhagat Puranmal

12) Hiramal Jamal

13) Raghubir Dharamkaur

14) Chaanderkiran
