= List of Haryanvi-language films =

Haryanvi films are films in the Haryanvi dialect of Hindi. Due to the dominance of the Mumbai-based Hindi film industry, films in Haryanvi were not extensively produced until the 1980s. The First movie of Haryanvi cinema is Dharti, released in 1968. The financial success of Devi Shankar Prabhakar's Chandrawal (1984) was largely responsible for the continuing production of Haryanvi films, although none have been as successful. Other films such as Phool Badan and Chora Haryane Ka followed with only about one out of twelve films being profitable at the box office. In 2000, Aswini Chowdhary won the Indira Gandhi Award for Best Debut Film of a Director at the National Film Awards for the Haryanvi film Laddo. In 2010 the government of Haryana announced they were considering establishing a film board to promote Haryanvi-language films. At the 62nd National Film Awards, the Haryanvi movie Pagdi The Honour won the award for Best Feature Film in Haryanvi and Baljinder Kaur won the National Film Award for Best Supporting Actress for her role in the same.

In the 63rd National Film Awards, Satrangi, directed by Sundeep Sharma, won the Best Feature Film in Haryanvi and also won six awards in the Haryana International Film Festival, Hissar in 2017. Yashpal Sharma won the best actor award for Satrangi in the JIFF (Jharkhand International Film Festival), 2018.

== Haryanvi Films ==
Year	Title	Cast	Director	Other notes
1973	Beera Shera	Bhale Ram Nain, Andana, Ashok Raj, Meena Roy	Pardeep Nayar	First Haryanvi film
1982	Bahurani	Sumitra Hooda, Shashi Ranjan, Bhal Singh, Mukta Chaudhary	Distributed by Manmohan Bansal directed by Arvind Swami	First Commercial successful Haryanvi Movie, 3rd Haryanvi Movie
1984	Chander kiran	Jagat Jakhad, Pushpa Soni directed by SS Rawal	Produced by Dilawar Singh	Best Actress award to Pushpa Soni for the film Chander Kiran at first Haryanvi Film Festival held in Feb, 1986 at Hisar.
1984	Chandrawal	Usha Sharma, Jagat Jakhar, Nasib Singh Kundu, Daryav Singh Malik	Devi Shankar Prabhakar	First Commercial superhit Haryanvi Movie
1984	Bhabhi Ka Aashirwad	Ram Chander Solanki, Faryal, Mehmood Junior, Sarwan, Bharat Bhushan	Mukul Dutt, Ram kumar vohra	
1985	Mhara Peehar Sasra	Raja Bundela, Alka Nupur, Manorama	Sudarshan Pal	Music by Ravindra Jain
1985	Chail Gaelyan Jaangi	Bhal Singh	Arvind Swami	
	Laado Basanti	Anoop Lather, Usha Sharma		
1986	Mhari Dharti Mhari Maa	Bhal Singh	Arvind Swami	
1987	Jhanakdar Kangana	Manasvi, Chitra,	S. Singh	
1987	Chora Haryane Ka	Gurdas Maan, Guggu Gill, Rama Vij, Mehar Mittal, Manjit Maan		Also released in Punjabi as Gabhroo Punjab Da
1988	Bairi	Bhal Singh, Shashi Ranjan	Arvind Swami	
1988	Phool Badan	Usha Sharma		
1993	Jat	Ashutosh Gowarikar, Gauri Seagan, Rajender Gupta, Daryav Singh Malik, Gopi Bhalla, Rajoo Pandit, Sheela Pahal, Mohini Sharma, Rajesh Jolly.	Swaran Singh Mor	Successful Haryanvi movie.
2001	Chand Chakori	Manju Bala, Ramesh Kaushik, Pawan Kumar Arya		
	Chandro	producer K D Sharma A neelkanth production		
	Chora Jat Ka directed by arvind swami			
	Gulaabo			
1991	Jatani	Usha Sharma, Rajesh Vedprakash		
	Ke Supney Ka Jikar			
	Lambardaar			
	Muklava			
	Phaagan Aaya Re			
2000	Laado	Ashutosh Rana, Rajendra Gupta, Arun Bali, Arundhati, Sanjay M. Singh	Ashwini Chaudhary	
2004	Dhakad chhora	Uttar kumar, Kamal Sharma		
2010	Rukke Padge	Ashok C Tyagi	Gaurav Prateek, Rajendra Gupta	One of the Best Hindi-Haryanvi Comedy Film
2011	Muthbhed - A Planned Encounter	Mukesh Tiwari		
2012	Chandrawal-2	Usha Sharma, Kuldeep Rathi, Bahan Sikha Nehra	Nishant Prabhakar	(Released 4 May 2012)
2014	Maati Kare Pukar	Pallavi, Sumit, Vijay Bhatotiya, Rajkumar Maan, Ranjit Singh and Dr. Raj Kumar Yadav	Col J K Singh	Released on UFO in Haryana on Jan,17 2014)
2014	Kunba	Uttar Kumar, Kader Khan	Yash chauhan	
2014	Dear vs Bear	Uttar Kumar, Manoj bakshi	Sanjeev Vedwan	
2015	Fighter War 4 Love	Vijay Verma, Neetu Verma	Vijay Verma	
2015	Pagdi: The Honour	Baljinder Kaur (Best supporting actress Award at 62nd National Film Awards) Yashpal Sharma (actor), Ravi chauhan, Brijesh sharma, Manisha Hans, Daksh Malhotra, Nidhi Mahla	Rajeev Bhatia	Best Haryanvi Film Award at 62nd National Film Awards
2016	Bare Feet Impressions (Nange Pavon ke Nishan)	Mukesh Musafir, Dolli Sharma, Ashish Tanwar, Surya, Manish Kumar	Yogesh Vats	Barefeet Impressions traveled worldwide prestigious Film Festivals.It was Produced By State Institute of Film and Television (SIFT), Rohtak.
2016	Satrangi	Yashpal Sharma (actor), Nargis Nandal, Sachin Shokeen, Amit Jairath, Mahabir Guddu, Geeta Agarwal Sharma, Naveen Ohlyan, Sagar Saini	Sundeep Sharma	Best Haryanvi Film Award at the 63rd National Film Awards
2017	Unkahi	Geetu Pari (Mother), Dikshant Dahiya (Kuku), Shushant Dahiya (Monu)	Robin Sharaya	Nominated at Mumbai International Film Festival 2020 (Student's Film), Jagran Film Festival 2018 (Best Indian Short Film, "Short is Sweet" section), and Dehradun International Film Festival 2018 (Best Short Film). At Cut.In Students' National Film Festival 2019, won Golden Excellence for Best Editing (Hitesh Dua) and was nominated for Best Cinematography (Akshit Gandhi) and Best Short Film.
2019	Weg	Dushyant Kumar (as Weg), Rahul Saroha, Girish Katyal, Toshab Bagri	Robin Sharaya	WEG is the Haryanvi superhero short film by Robin Sharaya, set during the British colonial era. It introduces Weg, a young boy born with super speed. Produced by State Institute of Film and Television.
2021	Malaal (Film)	Yashpal Sharma, Yogesh Bhardwaj, Abhimanyu Yadav, Tina Bhatia, Mukesh Musafir	Directed and Written By Ranjeet Chauhan	Best director Award at HIFF and Best Actor at HIFF to Yogesh Bhardwaj.
2021	Chapper Phadke (Film)	Ramkesh Jiwanpurwala, Abhimanyu Yadav, Anjavi Singh Hooda, Manoj Rathi, Akash Chawariya, Yogesh Bhardwaj, Suren Savitri Sarkar.	Directed and Written By Ranjeet Chauhan	
2022	Dada Lakhmi	Yashpal Sharma, Meghna Malik, Rajendra Gupta	Yashpal Sharma	Best Haryanvi Film Award at the 68rd National Film Awards

== See also ==
- State Institute of Film and Television
- Saang
- Haryanvi cinema
- Haryanvi language
- Haryanvi music
- Indian musical instruments
- List of Indian folk dances
- Bollywood
