= History of Brampton =

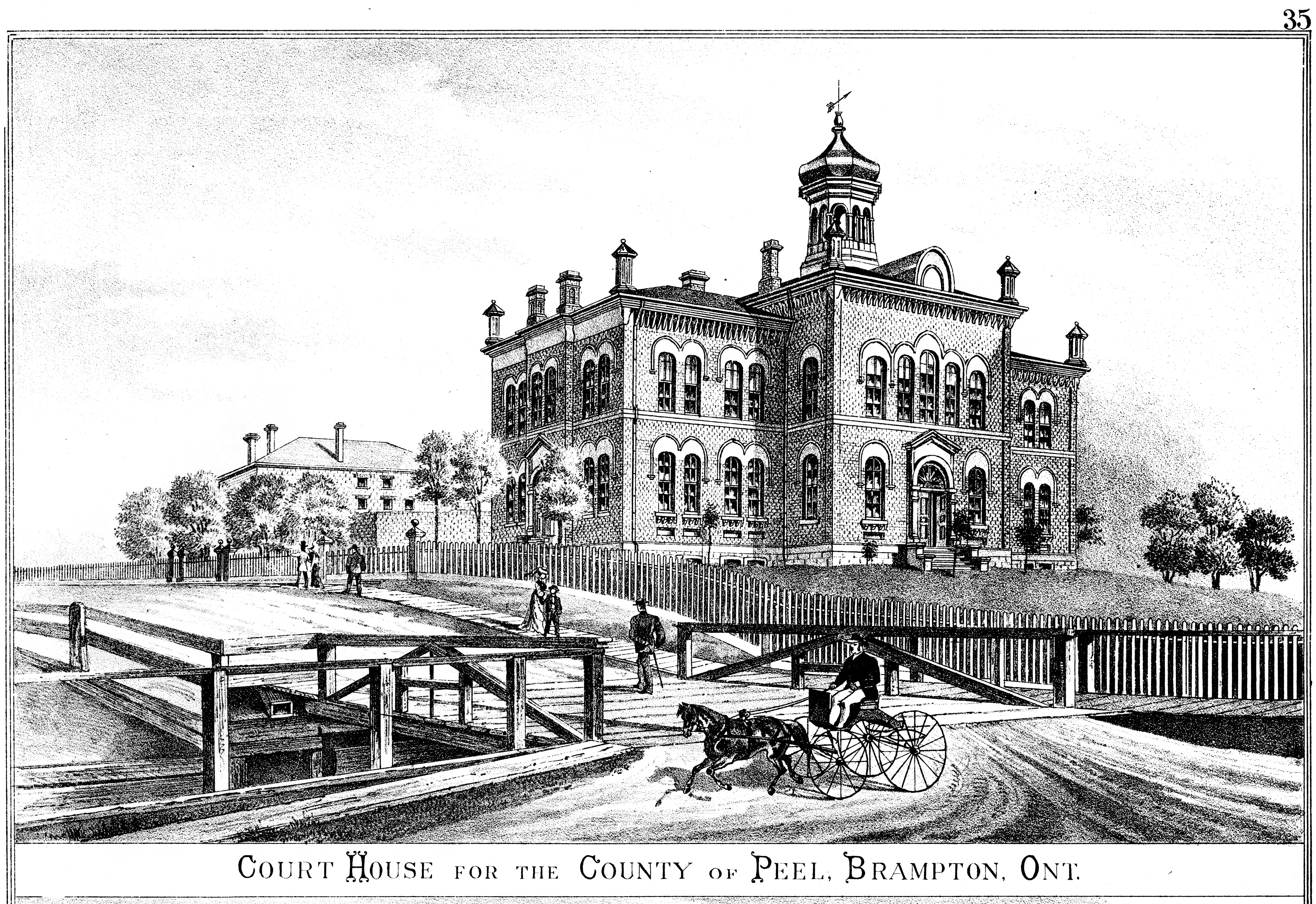
Depiction of the Peel County Courthouse in Brampton, 1877. The building presently serves as the Peel Art Gallery, Museum and Archives.

Following is an outline is for the history of Brampton, the third largest city in Ontario, Canada. European settlers arrived began to settle the area in the early 19th century, with Brampton being formally incorporated into a village in 1853.

== Before 20th century ==
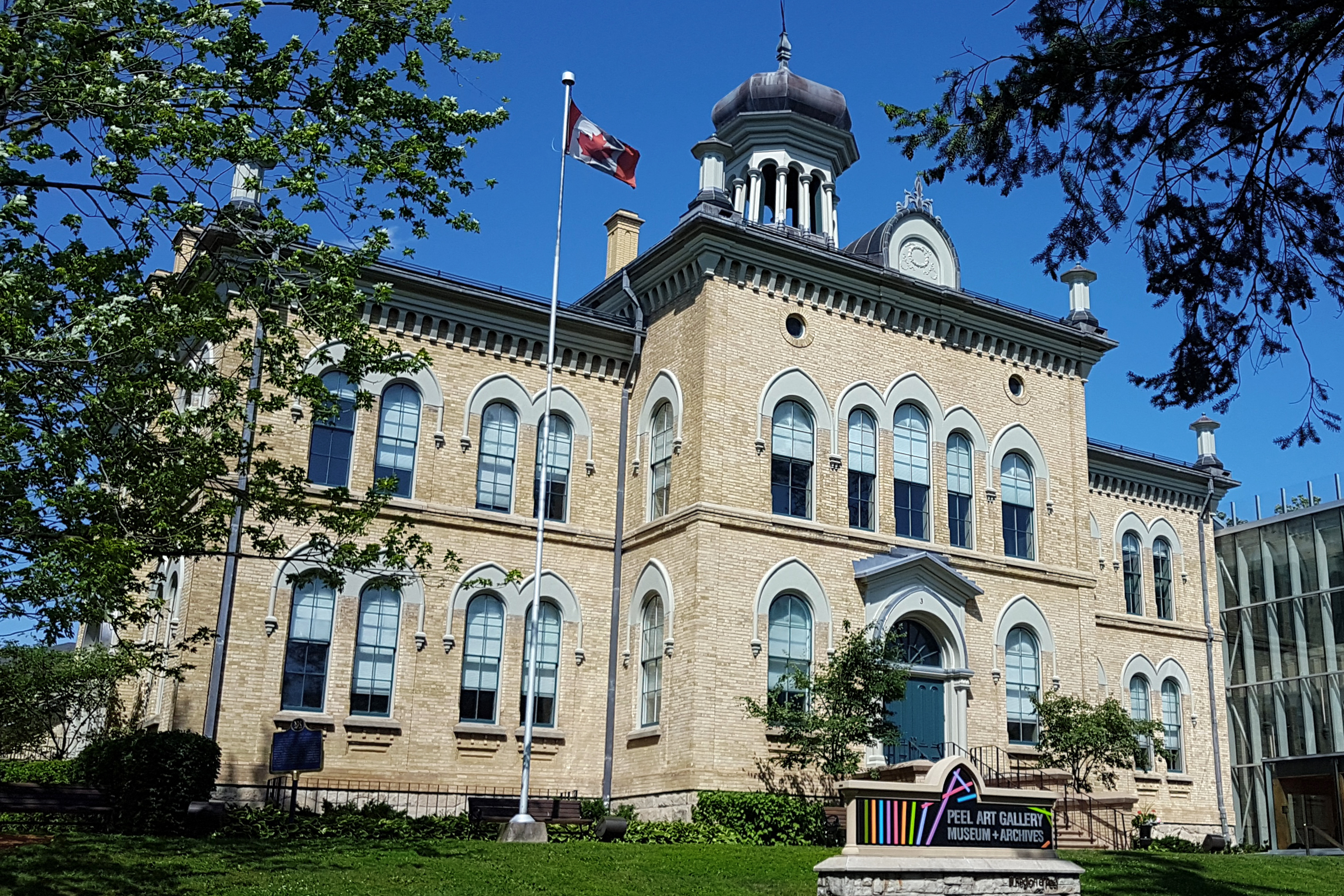
Now an art gallery, the Peel County Courthouse was built in 1865–66

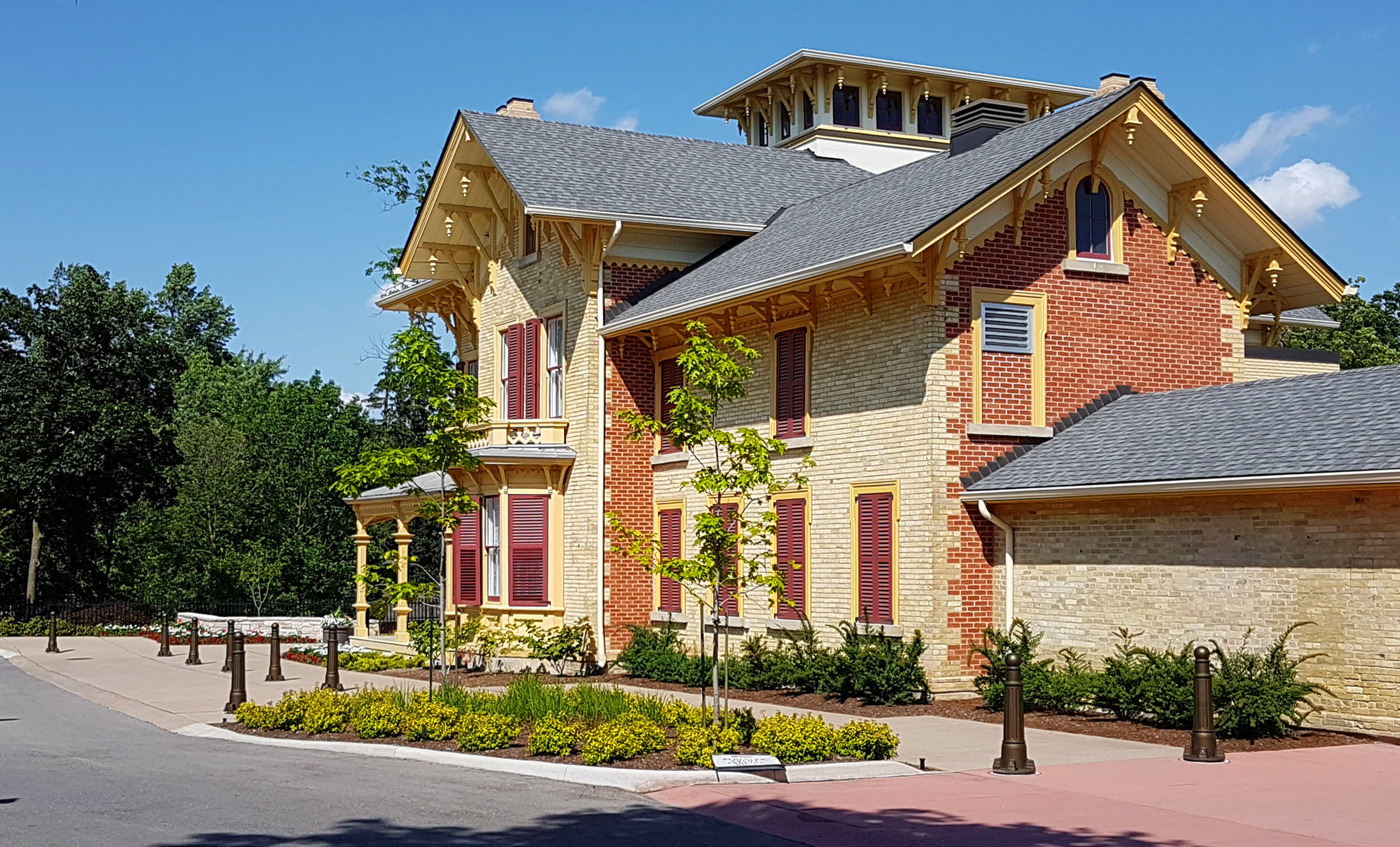
The Alder Lee mansion was built for businessman Kenneth Chisholm c.1867

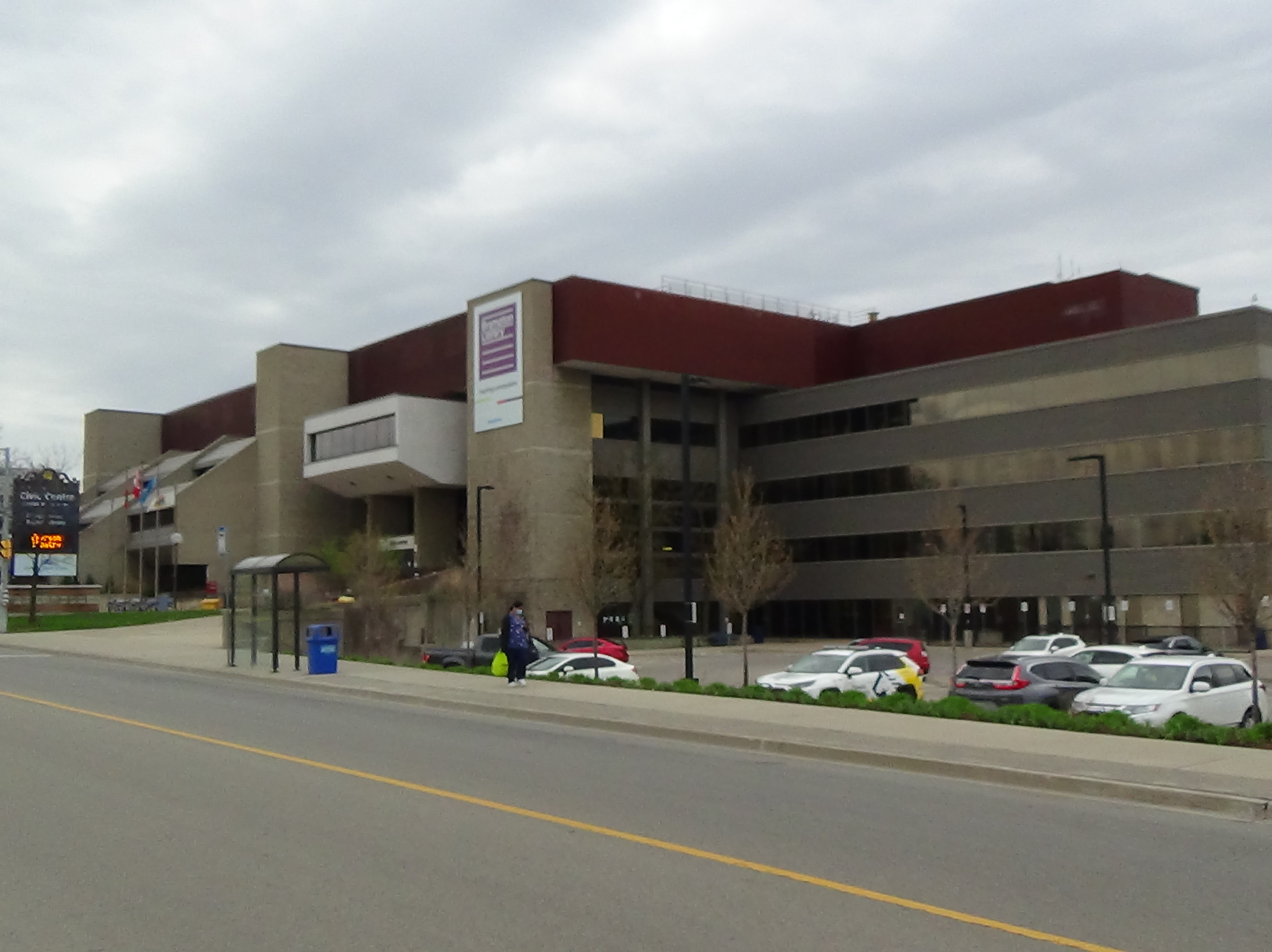
Bramalea Civic Centre building, built in 1972, was the former home of the Chinguacousy Township offices

The Mississaugas of the Credit First Nation held 648,000 acres of land north of the Head of the Lake Purchase lands and extending to the unceded territory of the Chippewa of Lakes Huron and Simcoe. The area of present-day Brampton was covered by the Ajetance Purchase of 1818 between James Ajetance, the chief of the Mississaugas of Credit, and the United Kingdom.

Prior to 1834, the only building of consequence at the corner of Hurontario Street and the 5th Sideroad (now Main and Queen Streets in the centre of Brampton), was William Buffy's tavern. In fact, at the time, the area was referred to as "Buffy's Corners". Most business in Chinguacousy Township took place one mile distant at Martin Salisbury's tavern. By 1834, John Elliott laid out the area in lots for sale applied the name "Brampton" to the area, which was soon adopted by others.

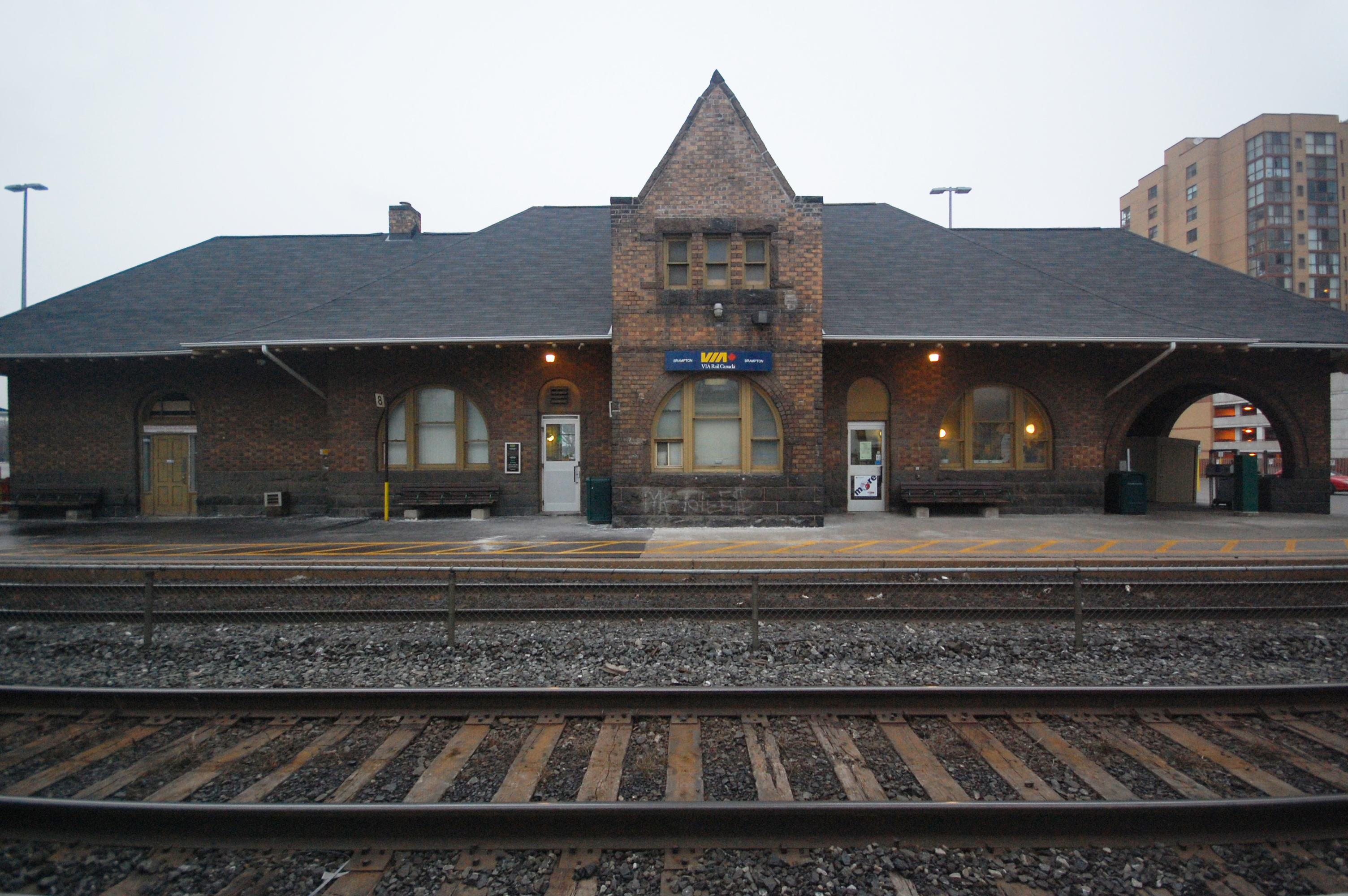
Brampton Railway Station

In 1853, a small agricultural fair was set up by the then-new County Agricultural Society of the County of Peel, and was held at the corner of Main and Queen streets. Grains, produce, roots, and dairy products were up for sale, a precursor of today's Brampton Farmers' Market. Horses and cattle, along with other lesser livestock, were sold at market. This agricultural fair eventually became the modern Brampton Fall Fair. In that same year Brampton was incorporated as a village. In 1856, a terminal and railroad line were developed in Brampton by the Grand Trunk Railway.

In January 1867, Peel County separated from the County of York, a union which had existed since 1851. In 1884 a group of mechanics of the Haggert Foundry of Brampton formed what is now known as the Brampton Concert Band, one of Canada's oldest community concert bands. By 1869, Brampton had a population of 1,800.

== 20th century ==
In 1902, Sir William J. Gage (owner of Gage Publishing, a publishing house specializing in school text books) purchased a 3.25 acres (1.3 hectares) part of the gardens and lawns of the Alder Lea estate (now called Alderlea) that had been built on Main Street by Kenneth Chisolm in 1867 to 1870. (Chisholm, a merchant and founding father of Brampton, had been the Town reeve, then warden of Peel County, then MPP for Brampton and eventually, Registrar of Peel County.) Sir William donated 1.7 acres (0.7 hectares) of the property to the town, with a specific condition that it be made into a park. Citizens donated $1,054 and the town used the funds to purchase extra land to ensure a larger park.

In 1922, when the town's population had reached 8,000, the Capitol Theatre was built in downtown Brampton. Its schedule consisted of primarily of vaudeville and silent movies. A group of regional farmers in Brampton had trouble getting insurance from city-based companies. After several meetings in Clairville Hall, it was decided that they should found the County of Peel Farmers Mutual Fire Insurance Company. In 1955, the company moved to its third and current location, 103 Queen Street West, and renamed itself Peel Mutual Insurance Company. It reigns as the longest running company in modern Brampton. Harmsworth Decorating Centre was established in 1890, as Harmsworth and Son, operated out of the family's house on Queen Street West. The store purchased its current location on September 1, 1904, after a fire destroyed their original store. Purchased for $1400, the 24 Main Street South location is the longest operating retail business in what is now Brampton.

The Brampton Mall was built in 1960 on Main Street, near Peel Village, marking the community's first mall.

=== 1970s ===
==== Development of Bramalea ====
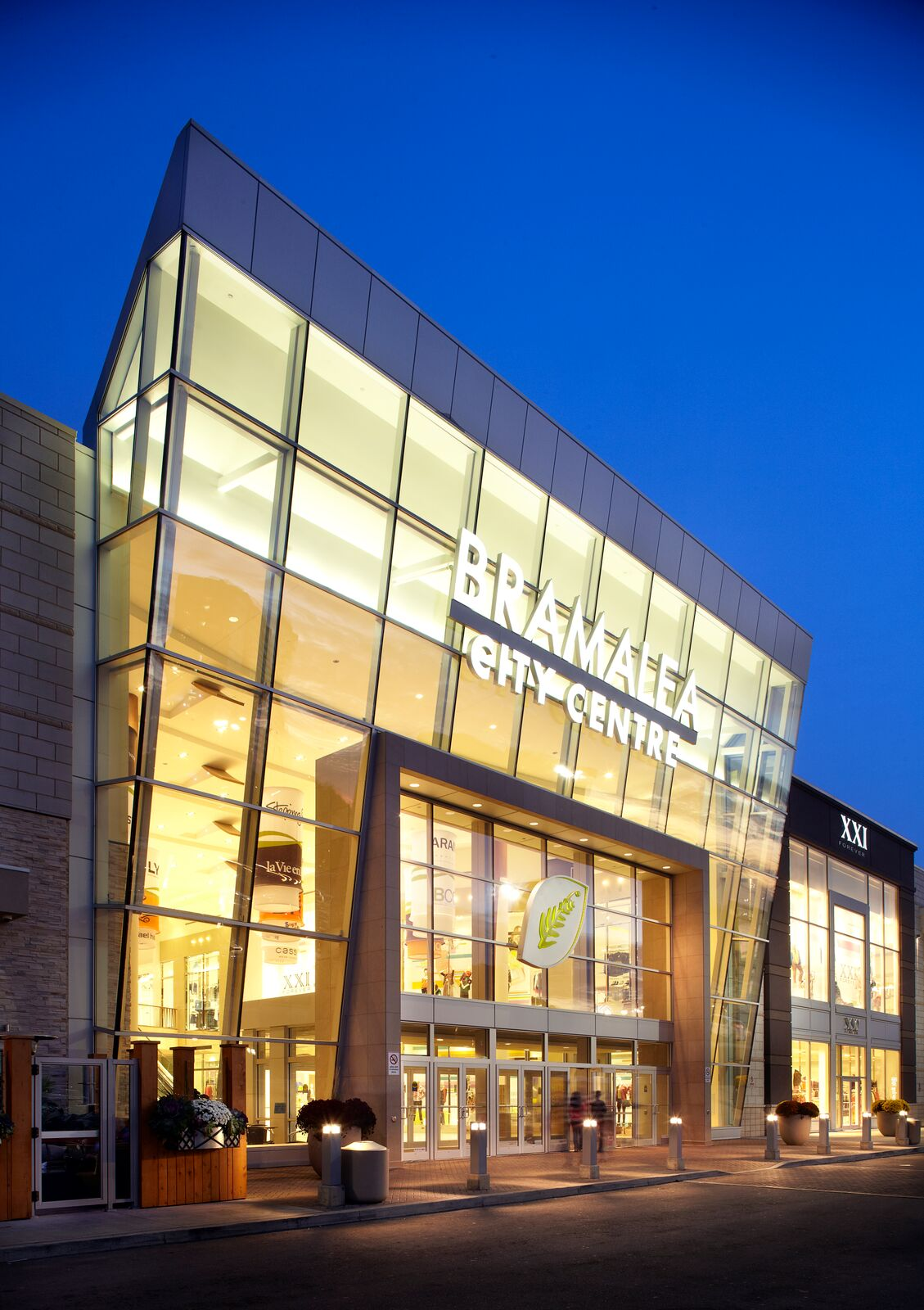
Opened in 1973, Bramalea City Centre was one of several major developments in Bramalea.

Bramalea was developed as an innovative "new town." A separate community, approximately 40 kilometres northwest of Toronto. It is located in the former Chinguacousy Township, it was Canada's first satellite community developed by one of the country's largest real estate developers, Bramalea Limited, formerly known as Brampton Leasing. The name "Bramalea" was created by the farmer William Sheard, who integrated the BRAM from Brampton, MAL from Malton (A neighbouring region), and the EA from his own farm; SunnymEAd Farms. He sold the land to Brampton Leasing developers and built one of Bramalea's first houses on Dixie road across from the former headquarters of Nortel. The community had an extensive Master Plan, which included provisions for a parkland trail system and a "downtown," which would include essential services and a shopping centre. The downtown area's centrepiece was the Civic Centre, which included the city hall and library. Directly across Team Canada Drive from the Civic Centre, Bramalea Limited built a shopping centre named Bramalea City Centre. The two centrepieces were connected by a long tunnel, which has long since been closed due to safety issues. Other features included a police station, fire hall, bus terminal, and a collection of seniors' retirement homes.

Each phase of the new city was built with progressing first letters of street names. Development started with the "A" section, with street names like Argyle, Avondale, and Aloma. Developer then created a "B" section, "C" section, and so forth. Children on the boundaries of these divisions would regularly compete in street hockey games, pitting, for example, the "D" section versus the "E" section.

The community was also initially developed with a large number of recreational facilities, including tennis courts, playgrounds, hockey/lacrosse rinks and swimming pools. An extensive parkland trail and sidewalk system that connects the entire city, amplifying what Brampton already had in a smaller scale.

==== Air Canada Flight 621 ====
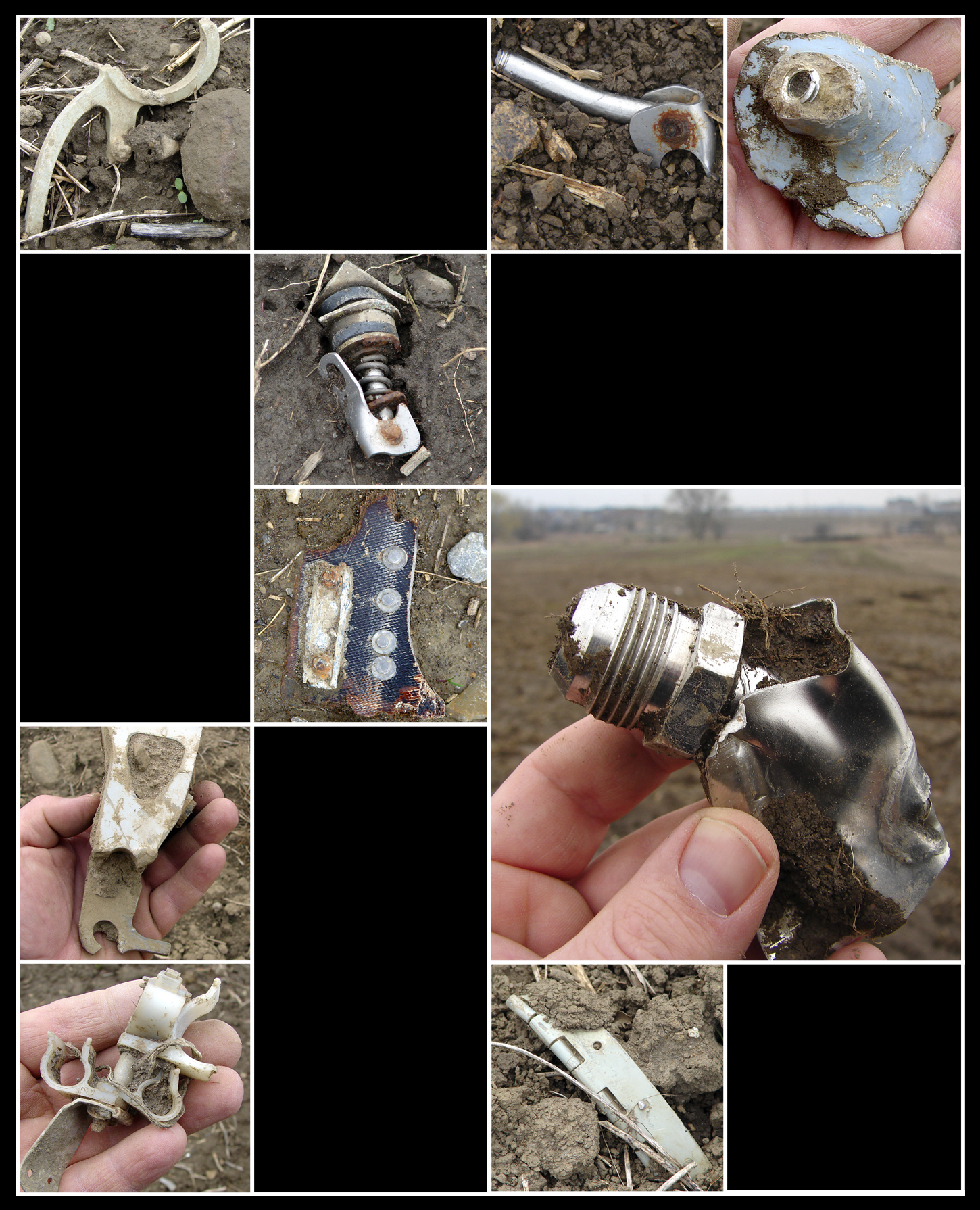
Pieces from the Air Canada Flight 621 crash, which occurred in Brampton.

On July 5, 1970 Air Canada Flight 621 crashed into the Toronto Pearson International Airport located in what was then known as Toronto Gore Township killing all 109 passengers and crew on board. It is known that the tragedy was the second-deadliest aviation incident in Canadian history. The plane was a McDonnell Douglas DC-8-63 that had 100 passengers and 9 crew flying from Montreal to Los Angeles via Toronto.

A memorial park named "Purple Lilac Memorial Park" was officially dedicated in memory of the incident on July 4, 2013. At the memorial, lilac trees are in bloom, and 109 markers made of pink polished granite are set in a mosaic along the path to represent each victim. They are arranged in groups to symbolise the family members travelling on the same plane.

==== Reorganization ====
In 1974, the Ontario government decided to update Peel County's structure. Along with amalgamating several towns and villages into the new City of Mississauga, the present City of Brampton was created out of the town and the greater portion of the Townships of Chinguacousy and Toronto Gore, and the northern extremity of Mississauga south of Steeles Avenue, including Bramalea, Churchville, and the other communities in those municipalities. The province restructured Peel County into Peel Region. Brampton retained its role as the administrative centre of Peel Region, which it already had as county seat. The regional council chamber, the Peel Regional Police force, the public health department, and the region's only major museum, the Peel Heritage Complex, are all located in Brampton.

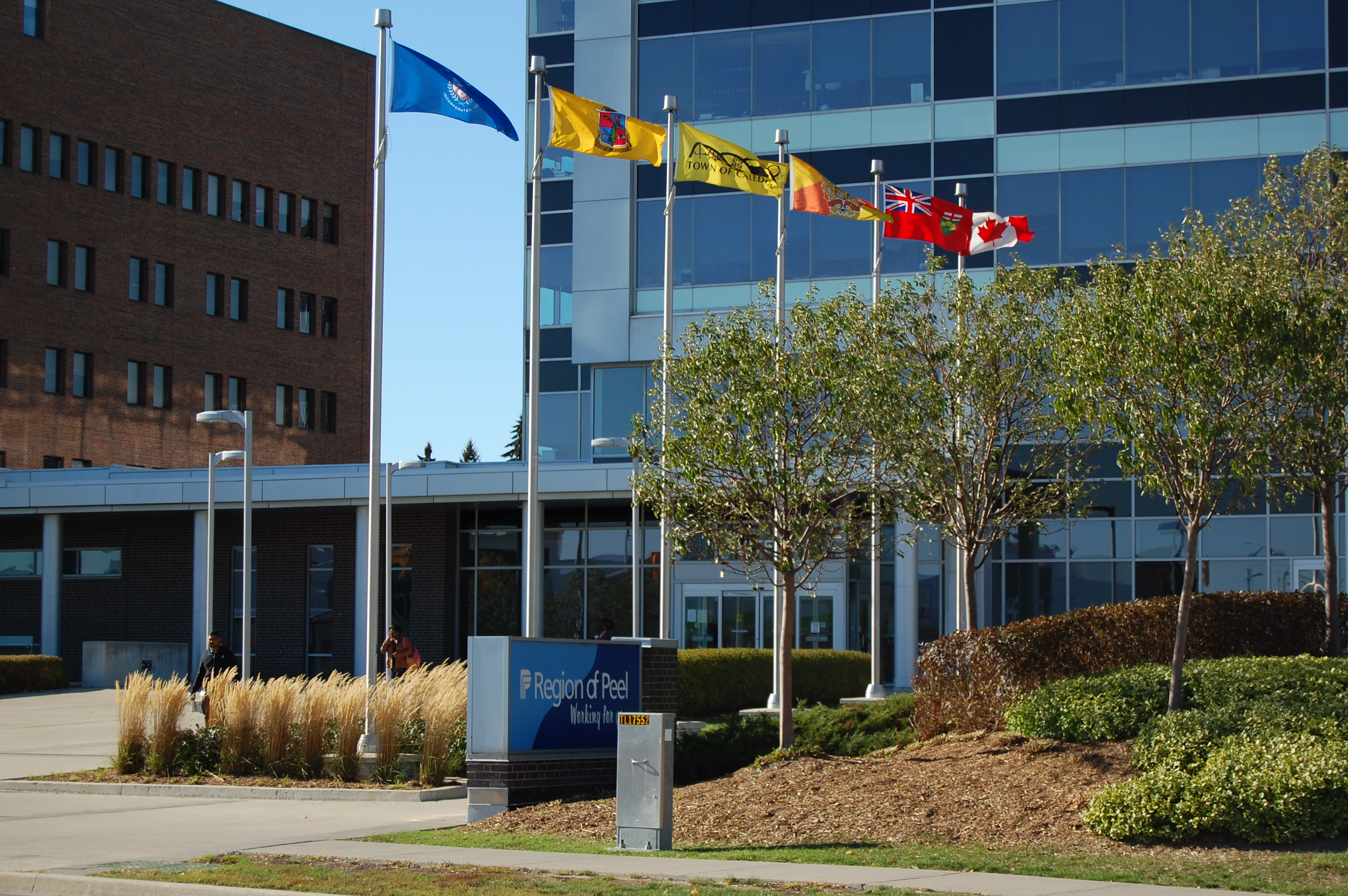
Peel Region's offices in Brampton. The city retained its role as the administrative centre of Peel following its reorganization.

In 1972, a new civic centre for Chinguacousy Township was opened in Bramalea. Two years after it was built, when Brampton and Chinguacousy merged, the new city's council chambers and other facilities were created in the building, moving from the old Town of Brampton's modest downtown locale. The library systems of Brampton and Chinguacousy became one, creating a system of four locations.

The future of Peel Region as encompassing Brampton, Mississauga, and Caledon, has been called into question by some. Mississauga council, led by Mayor Hazel McCallion, voted in favour of becoming a single tier municipality and asked the provincial government to be separated from Peel Region, arguing that the city has outgrown the need for a regional layer of government and that Mississauga is now being held back by supporting Brampton and Caledon with its municipal taxes.

=== Late-20th century ===
In the 1980s, the Capitol Theatre, then owned by Odeon, closed its doors. The City bought the facility in 1981, under the spearhead of then-councillor Diane Sutter, turning the former movie house and vaudevillian stage into a theatre for the musical and performing arts. It was renamed the Heritage Theatre. In 1983, Toronto consultants Woods Gordon reported to the City that, rather than continue "pouring money" into the Heritage, a new 750-seat facility should be built. The 2005/06 season was designated as the theatre's "grand finale" season.

Carabram was founded in 1982, after volunteers from different ethnic communities wanted to organize a festival celebrating diversity and cross-cultural friendship. With a name based on Toronto like-event, Caravan Festival of Cultures, Carabram's first event included Italian, Scottish, Ukrainian, and West Indian pavilions. By 2003, forty-five-thousand visitors visited 18 pavilions. Canada itself had an anchor pavilion in the late-1980s, early-1990s, but ceased when it failed to get sponsorship.

The early 1990s brought a new city hall to Brampton's downtown. The facility was designed by Robert J. Posliff Architect and constructed by Inzola Construction.

The Brampton Fair Grounds were sold in 1992 to the City of Brampton, leading the Agricultural Society to relocate to Heart Lake Road and Old School Road in 1997.

The Health Services Restructuring Commission (HSRC) decided in 1997 that Georgetown and District Memorial Hospital, Etobicoke General Hospital and Peel Memorial Hospital amalgamate into the William Osler Health Centre, becoming what now is the province's 6th largest hospital corporation. In early 2006, the Brampton campus of the William Osler Health Centre was renamed back to Peel Memorial Hospital, as residents continued to use the old name, a cause of much confusion.

== 21st century ==
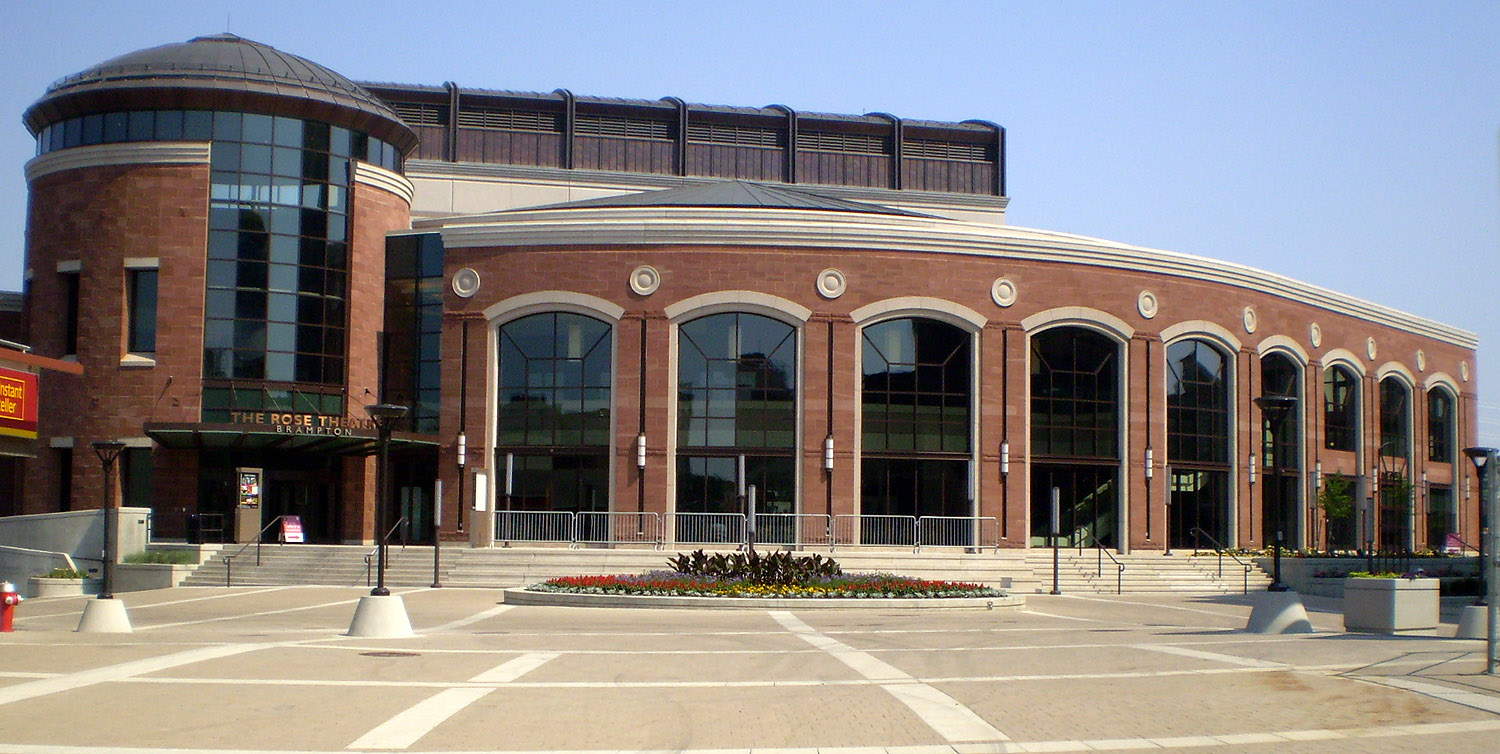
The Rose Theatre is a performing arts centre that opened in Brampton in 2006.

On 24 June 2002, the City Council established the "Flower City Strategy", to promote a connection to its flower-growing heritage. The intention was to inspire design projects and community landscaping to beautify the city, adopt a sustainable environmental approach, and to protect its natural and cultural heritage. The Rose Theatre was named in keeping with this vision and is to serve as a cultural institution in the city. In addition, the city participates in the national Communities in Bloom competition as part of that strategy.

The Rose Theatre (originally the Brampton Performing Arts Centre), billed as "a cultural and tourist destination that will attract significant new business to surrounding restaurants, shops and services," opened in September 2006. The City says that the facilities are expected to generate $2.7 million in economic activity the first year and grow to $19.8 million by the fifth year. This is predicted to attract more than 55,000 visitors annually who will spend about $275,000 on before and after-show entertainment, creating close to 300 permanent jobs. Despite the great promises, this project is the source of much cynicism among the community. Many have questioned the need for a larger facility, as the current Heritage Theatre rarely reaches capacity, and a great deal of residents don't meet the prime theatre going audience profile.

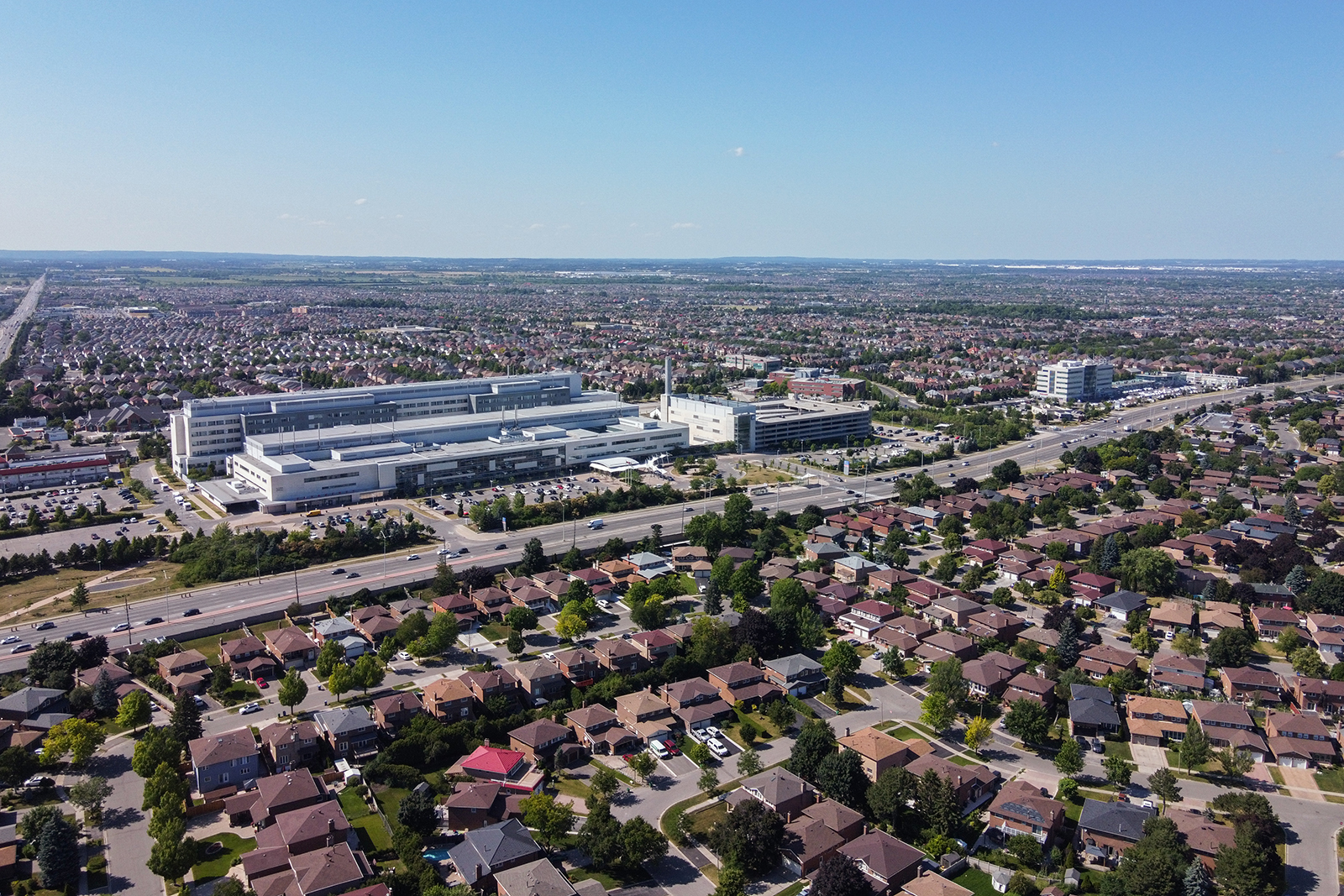
Brampton Civic Hospital established in 2007, which replaced Peel Memorial Hospital.

A new hospital was built in north Brampton, to supplement the Peel Memorial Hospital. The Brampton Civic Hospital established in 2007 to serve Brampton in place of the Peel Memorial Hospital that had previously existed.

Brampton's 2003 Sesquicentennial celebrations were a booster to community spirit, restarting the tradition of a summer parade (with 100 floats), and creating other initiatives. To commemorate the Flowertown history, the City under Mayor Fennell reintroduced floral projects to the community, including more plantings around town, the restart of the Flowercity Parade in 2005, and participation for the last few years in the Canada Communities in Bloom project.

Brampton also embraces its Lesbian, Gay, Bisexual, and Transgender community, with Mayor Susan Fennell proclaiming Gay Pride Day in 2004 and 2005, and a Gay Pride Week in 2006.

The city's mascot is "Sassy the Sesqui Squirrel", a character that replaced "Millie the Millennium Techno Bug", now the HACE mascot.

In 2025, Brampton passed Mississauga to become the third most populated city in Ontario.

=== Multiculturalism ===
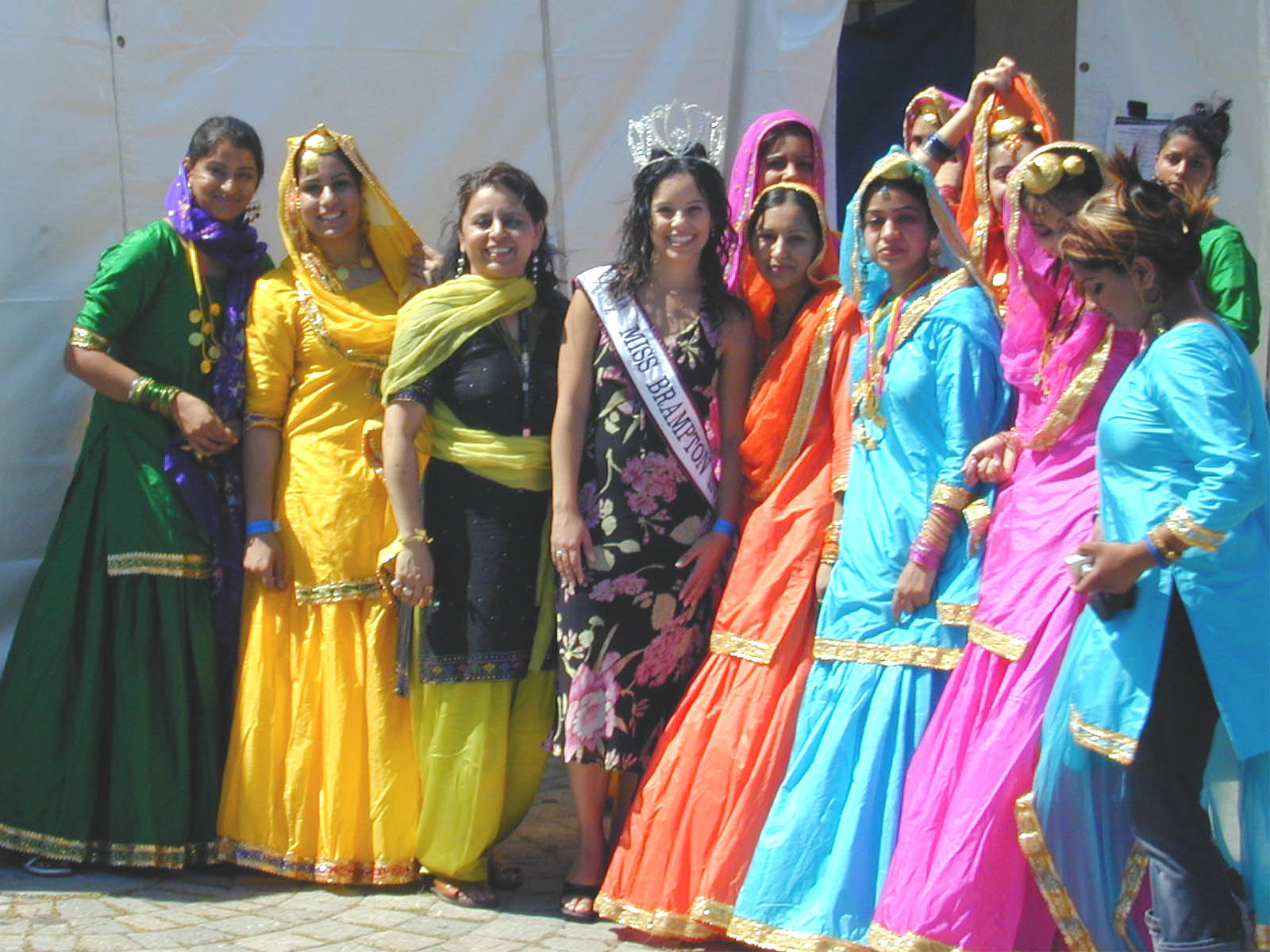
Miss Brampton and the Punjabi Virsa Art & Culture Academy, before a bhangra performance.

With a growing multicultural population, the Peel Board of Education introduced evening English as a Second Language (ESL) classes at high schools. Originally taught by volunteers, the classes eventually became daytime courses taught by paid instructors. In the 1980s, the public and Catholic board expanded its languages programs, offering night classes in 23 languages. These were introduced by the urging of parents who wanted their children to learn their ancestral heritage and language.

== See also ==
- History of Ontario
