= Haryanvi cinema =

Indian Haryanvi language film industry

- No. of screens: Approx 106 in Haryana state of India.
- Main distributors: Unknown

Produced feature films (2022)
- Total: 4 (Theatrical)

Gross box office (2023)
- Total: India: ₹0.00 crore (US$0.00 million)
- National films: India: ₹0 crore (US$0.00)

Haryanvi cinema is the Haryanvi language film industry of the Indian state of Haryana. It is dedicated to the production of motion pictures in the Haryanvi language, which is widely spoken in the region.

== History ==
The history of Haryanvi cinema can be traced back to its first film, Beera Shera, released in 1973, Produced by B.R. Kundra and directed by Pradeep Nayyar.

Chandrawal, released in 1984, was the first commercially successful Haryanvi film. The film was produced by Devi Shankar Prabhakar and starred Usha Sharma, Jagat Jakhar, Nasib Singh Kundu, and Daryav Singh Malik. Its financial success played a crucial role in the continued production of Haryanvi films, although none have matched its success since.

Laado, released in 2000, was another significant film in Haryanvi cinema, featuring actor Ashutosh Rana and directed by Ashwini Chaudhary. It won the Indira Gandhi Award for Best Debut Film of a Director at the National Film Awards, making it the first Haryanvi film to win a national award.

In 2014, Pagdi The Honour garnered two National Film Awards at the 62nd National Film Awards. Baljinder Kaur received the National Film Award for Best Supporting Actress for her performance in the film, and the film was awarded Best Feature Film in Haryanvi.

In 2016, Satrangi won the 63rd National Film Awards for Best Feature Film in Haryanvi. The film, directed by Sundeep Sharma, also earned Yashpal Sharma the Best Actor Award at the Jharkhand International Film Festival (JIFF) in 2018. It was successful at the Haryana International Film Festival, winning six awards in 2017.

== Notable films ==
- Beera Shera (1973), the first haryanvi film.
- Bahurani (1981), first superhit film.
- Chandrawal (1984), first financial successful blockbuster with Silver Jublee.
- Jat (1991)
- Dhakad Chhora (2004), A film that restarted the almost shut-down film industry, a blockbuster hit.

== Festivals ==
Name	Est.	City	Type	Details	Website
Haryana International Film Festival	2016	Hisar	International	Annual showcase of Haryanvi films	HIFF

== Film artists ==
Name	Origin	Notable works	Contributions
Usha Sharma	Haryana	Gulaabo, Pagdi The Honour	Impactful roles in Haryanvi cinema; promotes women's representation.
Arun Bali	Punjab	Chandrawal, Dharti	Veteran actor known for versatility in regional cinema.
Gurdaas Maan	Punjab	Satrangi, Kurbani Ek Junoon	Celebrated singer and actor; significant figure in Punjabi and Haryanvi music.
Jagat Jakhar	Haryana	Muthbhed - A Planned Encounter, Yaari	Noted for performances resonating with local audiences.
Jaideep Ahlawat	Haryana	Tera Mera Vaada, Pagdi The Honour	Recognized for strong, character-driven performances.
Rajendra Gupta	Haryana	Chora Haryane Ka, Phool Badan	Esteemed actor with diverse body of work in Indian cinema.
Satish Kaushik	Haryana	Yaari, Beera Shera	Versatile actor and director; contributions to comedy and drama.
Sri Vallabh Vyas	Rajasthan	Chand Chakori, Chora Jat Ka	Renowned for compelling performances in supporting roles.
Uttar Kumar	Haryana	Mahari Dharti Mahari Maa, Lambardaar	Recognized for work in Haryanvi films and cultural contributions.

== Directors ==
Name	From	Notable works
Rajeev Bhatia	N/A	Muthbhed - A Planned Encounter, Tera Mera Vaada
Sundeep Sharma	N/A	Satrangi, Kurbani Ek Junoon
Surinder Walia	N/A	London Ki Chhori
Robin Sharaya	Chhatehra	Unkahi, Weg
Aman Punia	Bichpari	Chulha Nyond

== Cinematographers ==
Name	From	Notable works
Neeraj Jangra	Rohtak	Measure of Silence, Dhara Ka Tame
Abhishek Saini	Bahadurgarh	Chhaya, Beyond the Wool

== Editors ==
Name	From	Notable works
Sahil Sharaya	Chhatehra	Gehu
Hitesh Dua	Rohtak	Unkahi

== Haryana Film Policy ==
In May 2024, the Haryana government granted financial incentives to six films selected under the Haryana Film Policy. The selected films included Chhalaang, Tera Kya Hoga Lovely, Teri Meri Gal Ban Gayi, and Fuffad Ji. These films were recognized for promoting local culture, language, and talent. The state’s film policy aims to support regional filmmakers and attract production to Haryana.

Year	Film title	Director/Producer	Notable Achievement
1968	Dharti	Kidar Sharma	First Haryanvi film
1982	Bahurani	N/A	N/A
1984	Chandrawal	N/A	Most successful Haryanvi film
1984	Chander Kiran	SS Rawal	N/A
1985	Laado Basanti	Devi Shanker Prabhaker	N/A
1986	Phool Badan	Devi Shanker Prabhaker	N/A
1986	Mahari Dharti Mahari Maa	Arvind Swami	N/A
1987	Jhanakdar Kangana	B S Rao	N/A
1987	Phaagan Aaya Re	N/A	N/A
N/A	Bairee	N/A	N/A
N/A	Bataeu	N/A	N/A
1973	Beera Shera	Pardeep Nayar	N/A
N/A	Chabilee	N/A	N/A
N/A	Chail Gabharu	N/A	N/A
N/A	Chail Gaelyan Jaangi	N/A	N/A
N/A	Chand Chakori	N/A	N/A
N/A	Chandro	N/A	N/A
N/A	Chora Haryane Ka	N/A	N/A
N/A	Chora Jat Ka	N/A	N/A
N/A	Gulaabo	N/A	N/A
1991	Jatani	Devi Shanker Prabhaker	N/A
N/A	Ke Supney Ka Jikar	N/A	N/A
N/A	Lambardaar	N/A	N/A
N/A	Mahara Pihar Sansara	N/A	N/A
N/A	Muklava	N/A	N/A
N/A	Panghat	N/A	N/A
N/A	Phool Badan	Devi Shanker Prabhaker	N/A
N/A	Piya	N/A	N/A
N/A	Premi Ramphal	N/A	N/A
N/A	Yaari	N/A	N/A
2004	Dhakad Chhora	Dinesh Chaudhary	N/A
N/A	Muthbhed - A Planned Encounter	N/A	N/A
2012	Chandrawal-2	Nishant Prabhakar	N/A
2012	Tera Mera Vaada	Bhaal Singh Balhara	N/A
N/A	Modern Girl Desi Chhora	N/A	N/A
N/A	Maati Kare Pukar	N/A	N/A
N/A	London Ki Chhori	N/A	N/A
2014	Kunba	Yash Chouhan	N/A
2014	Tere Te Pyar Hoya	N/A	N/A
2014	Pagdi The Honour	Rajeev Bhatia	National Award-winning film
2016	Satrangi	Sundeep Sharma	Best Haryanvi Film Award at the 63rd National Film Awards
2017	Unkahi	Robin Sharaya	Nominated at Mumbai International Film Festival 2020 (Student's Film), Jagran Film Festival 2018 (Best Indian Short Film, "Short is Sweet" section), and Dehradun International Film Festival 2018 (Best Short Film). At Cut.In Students' National Film Festival 2019, won Golden Excellence for Best Editing (Hitesh Dua) and was nominated for Best Cinematography (Akshit Gandhi) and Best Short Film.
2019	Weg	Robin Sharaya	It is the Haryanvi superhero film by Robin Sharaya, set during the British colonial era. It introduces Weg, a young boy born with super speed. Produced by State Institute of Film and Television
2022	Dada Lakhmi	Yashpal Sharma	Best Haryanvi Film Award at the 68rd National Film Awards

== See also ==
Haryana

- Administrative divisions of Haryana
- Haryana#Culture
- Haryana Tourism Corporation
- List of Indian folk dances#Haryana
- Haryanvi language
- Music of Haryana
  - Saang

General

- Hindi cinema
- List of Indian musical instruments
- List of Indian folk dances
