= Haryanvis =

Indo-Aryan ethnolinguistic group

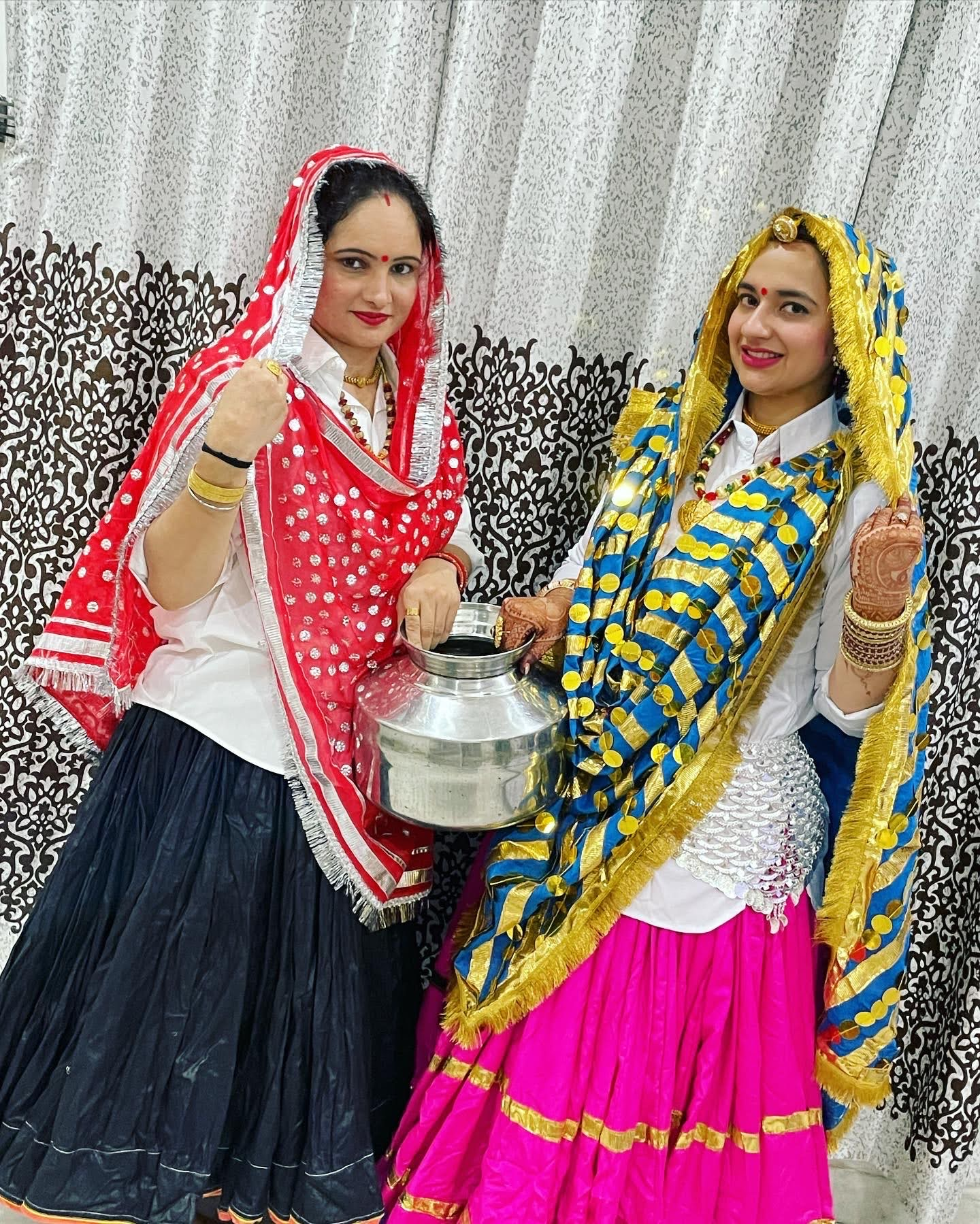
- Haryanvi women in folk costume

Total population
- 26 million

Regions with significant populations
- India (Haryana, Delhi)

Languages
- Haryanvi, Hindi

Religion
- Predominantly: Hinduism; Minority: Islam, Sikhism, Jainism

Related ethnic groups
- Indo-Aryan peoples

The Haryanvis are an Indo-Aryan ethnolinguistic group native to Haryana in northern India. They speak Haryanvi and some Rajasthani languages such as Ahirwati, Mewati,Gurjari and Bagri. The term Haryanvi has been used both in the ethnolinguistic sense and for someone from Haryana.

== Distribution ==
=== Haryanvi diaspora overseas ===
There is increasingly large diaspora of Haryanvis in Pakistan who migrated to Pakistan after partition in 1947, Australia, Canada, Singapore, New Zealand, Saudi Arabia, UAE, UK, US, etc.

In Australia, the community lives mainly in Sydney and Melbourne, has set up Association of Haryanvis in Australia (AHA) which organise events.

In Singapore, the community has set up the Singapore Haryanvi Kunba organisation in 2012 which also has a Facebook group of same name.

== Culture ==
The culture of Haryana is similar to neighbouring regions including Punjab.

=== Language ===
Haryanvi is a branch of the Western Hindi dialect, and it is written in a modified form of Devanagari script.

=== Folk music and dance ===
Folk music is integral part of Haryanvi culture. Folk songs are sung during occasion of child birth, wedding, festival, and Satsang (singing religious songs). Some dances are Khoriya, Chaupaiya, Loor, Been, Ghoomar, Dhamal, Phaag, Sawan and Gugga.

A Haryanvi folk story

A Haryanvi folk song about a Banjara (nomad)

=== Cuisine ===
Haryana is agricultural state known for producing foodgrains such as wheat, barley, pearl millet, maize, rice and high-quality dairy. Daily village meal in Haryana consist of a simple thali of roti, paired with a leafy stir-fry (saag in dishes such as gajar methi or aloo palak), condiments such as chaas, chutney, pickles. Some known Haryanvi dishes are green choliya (green chickpeas), bathua yogurt, bajre ki roti, sangri ki sabzi (beans), kachri ki chutney (wild cucumber) and bajre ki khichdi. Some sweets are panjiri and pinni prepared by unrefined sugar like bura and shakkar and diary. Malpua are popular during festivals.

=== Clothes ===
Traditional attire for men is turban, shirt, dhoti, jutti and cotton or woollen shawl. Traditional attire for female is typically an orhna (veil), shirt or angia (short blouse), ghagri (heavy long skirt) and Jitti. Saris are also worn. Traditionally the Khaddar (coarse cotton weave cloth) is a frequently used as the fabric.

=== Cinema ===
The first movie of Haryanvi cinema is Dharti which was released in 1968. The first financially successful Haryanvi movie was Chandrawal (1984) which spurted the continuing production of Haryanvi films, although none have been as successful. Other films such as Phool Badan and Chora Haryane Ka followed with only about one out of twelve films being profitable at the box office. In 2000, Aswini Chowdhary won the Indira Gandhi Award for Best Debut Film of a Director at the National Film Awards for the Haryanvi film Laddo. In 2010 the government of Haryana announced they were considering establishing a film board to promote Haryanvi-language films.
