= Phurlak =

Coordinates: 29°33′N 76°56′E

Phurlak is a village in Gharaunda Tehsil in Karnal District of Haryana State, India. It is located 18 km south of District headquarters Karnal, 5 km from Gharaunda (Part), and 153 km from State capital Chandigarh.

The Phurlak Pin code is 132114 and its postal head office is Gharunda. Gharaunda, Karnal, Panipat, and Taraori are the nearest cities to Phurlak. It is situated along the border of Karnal District and Panipat District. Panipat is south of Phurlak.

== Demographics ==
Phurlak is a large village located in Gharaunda Tehsil of Karnal district, Haryana with total 706 families residing. The Phurlak village has population of 3757 of which 1989 are males while 1768 are females as per Population Census 2011. In Phurlak village population of children with age 0-6 is 494 which makes up 13.15% of total population of village. Average Sex Ratio of Phurlak village is 889 which is higher than Haryana state average of 879. Child Sex Ratio for the Phurlak as per census is 915, higher than Haryana average of 834. Phurlak village has higher literacy rate compared to Haryana. In 2011, literacy rate of Phurlak village was 76.52% compared to 75.55% of Haryana. In Phurlak, male literacy stands at 86.54% while female literacy rate was 65.21%. As per constitution of India and Panchyati Raaj Act, Phurlak village is administrated by Sarpanch (Head of Village) who is elected representative of village.

Hindi and Haryanvi are the local languages. The village was founded by Pannu Jats. Pannu is the main caste in the village. Another Jat caste in the village is Dhanda & Malik.

== Education ==
- Govt. Senior Secondary School
- Ghs Phurlak

== Transport ==
=== Roadway ===
NH 44 distance 5 km from Phurlak The nearest railway station to Phurlak is Gharaunda which is located in and around 4.0 kilometer distance.

=== Railway ===
Gharaunda railway station 4.0 km.

Bazida Jatan railway station 7.1 km.

Karnal railway station 15.7 km.

Panipat Junction railway station 19.0 km.

=== Airway ===
The nearest Airport is in State capital Chandigarh 122 km away. Delhi International Airport can also be easily accessed from the area.

Karnal Airport 20.3 km.

Sarsawa Air Base 67.2 km.

Patiala Airport 100.3 km.
