= Sharaya =

- Jat clan
- Ethnicity: Haryanvis
- Language: Haryanvi
- Religion: Hinduism

Sharaya (also spelled as Saharaya, Sahraya, and Sehraya) is a Gotra of Jats mainly found in Sonipat district of Haryana in India.

== Origin ==
According to the Panda Brahmin's Pothi, the Sharaya Gotra is considered to be of Suryavanshi lineage, originating from Ayodhya, and they are believed to be descendants of Lord Shri Ram. This connection ties the Sharaya clan to the ancient solar dynasty, which is traditionally associated with Hindu mythology and the Ramayana.

== History ==
The Sharaya Gotra members have a proud history of military service, agriculture, and participation in India's freedom struggle. Many of the families from this Gotra have served in the Indian Armed Forces, with notable participation in wars involving India, particularly in the 1960s and 1970s. Freedom fighters from this Gotra, such as Abhe Ram Sharaya from Chhatehra, also played a significant role in India's fight for independence.

== Distribution in Haryana ==
The Sharaya Gotra is predominantly found in the Sonipat district, though families are also spread across other regions of Haryana.

- Busana
- Chhatehra
- Kharak (Rohtak)

== Notable Persons ==
- Abhe Ram Sharaya (अभे राम सहराया) – A renowned freedom fighter from Chhatehra, who played a pivotal role in India's struggle for independence. He bravely opposed British rule and was actively involved in various Indian independence movement. His legacy of courage and service to the nation has been passed down through his family, most notably to his son, Ranjeet Singh Sharaya.
- Ranjeet Singh Sharaya (रणजीत सिंह सहराया) Urf Jeet – Son of Abhe Ram Sharaya, a freedom fighter from Chhatehra. He was born on 1 July 1938 in the village of Chhatehra, tehsil Gohana, district Sonipat (formerly part of Rohtak district, Punjab). He joined the Indian Army in 1957 and enrolled in the Rajputana Rifles at the age of 19. Ranjeet Singh Sharaya fought in major wars including the Sino-Indian War of 1962, the Indo-Pakistani War of 1965, and the Indo-Pakistani War of 1971. His bravery earned him several military honors such as the General Service Medal (1947), Raksha Medal, 9 Years Long Service Medal and Paschimi Star. After retiring from the army in February 1993, he now lives with his family in his birthplace, Chhatehra.
