= Peel Memorial Hospital =

Coordinates: 43.69056°N 79.75100°W

- William Osler Health System
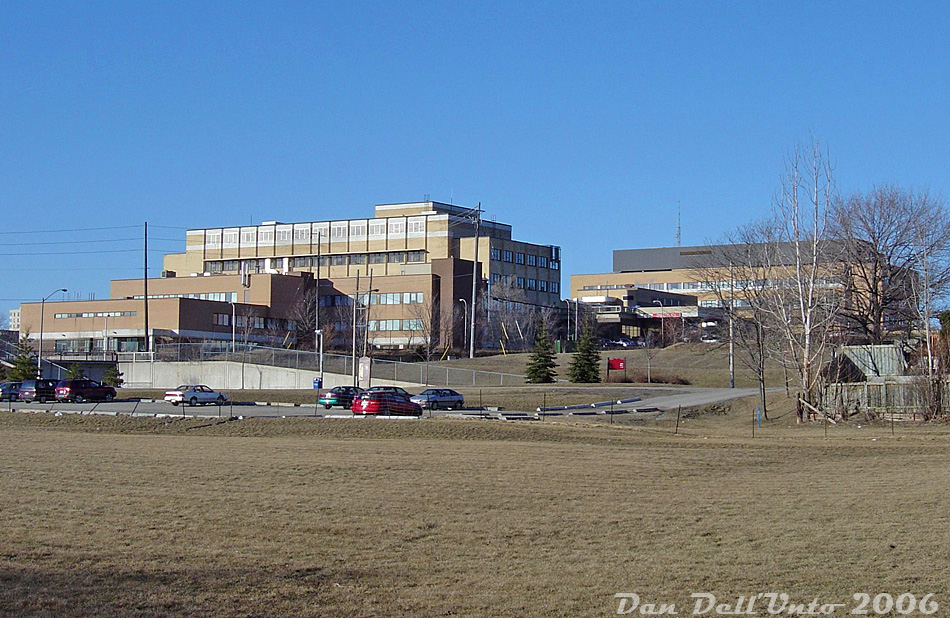
- Peel Memorial Hospital in 2006

Geography
- Location: Brampton, Peel Region, Ontario, Canada

Organization
- Care system: Public Medicare (Canada) (OHIP)
- Type: District General
- Affiliated university: None

Services
- Emergency department: Yes
- Beds: 367

History
- Founded: 1925
- Closed: 2007

Links
- Website: https://www.williamoslerhs.ca
- Lists: Hospitals in Canada

Peel Memorial Hospital (PMH) was a 367-bed acute care hospital located in central Brampton, Ontario. PMH was founded in 1925 and became a part of the William Osler Health Centre in 1998. It previously served approximately 400,000 residents in Brampton and the surrounding areas. Over 96,832 patients were treated on an out-patient basis, another 70,446 residents used the 24/7 emergency department and 22,889 patients were admitted for inpatient care (2001 estimate). The hospital employed over 1,800 professional and support personnel. There were 320 physicians as well as approximately 600 volunteers that contributed their services and fund raising efforts.

In 1997 the Health Services Restructuring Commission made a decision to amalgamate Georgetown and District Memorial Hospital, the Etobicoke General Hospital, and PMH to form the William Osler Health Centre. In early 2006, the Brampton campus of the William Osler Health Centre was renamed back to Peel Memorial Hospital, as residents continued to use the old name, a cause of much confusion.

It is superseded by the Peel Memorial Centre for Integrated Health and Wellness

Peel Memorial Hospital is currently funded by the Central West Local Health Integration Network (LHIN).

== Renovations (October 28, 2007) ==
According to the William Osler's website, "On Sunday October 28, 2007, health care programs and services at Peel Memorial Hospital were discontinued until redevelopment plans are developed and implemented." Upon closing, all Hospital services were transferred to the new Brampton Civic Hospital.

== Demolition and construction of Peel Memorial Centre ==
On February 10, 2012, demolition of the existing structure began. A new $530 million facility, Peel Memorial Centre, opened in 2017. It serves as a long-term health facility for those with chronic illness to make beds available, and alleviate pressure from the nearby Brampton Civic Hospital. It also features an urgent care facility which is designed to help in relieving, and reducing wait times at the main hospital (Brampton Civic).
