= William Osler Health System =

Coordinates: 43°43′46″N 79°35′53″W

Geography
- Location: Brampton and Etobicoke, Ontario, Canada

Organization
- Care system: Public Medicare (Canada) (OHIP)
- Affiliated university: Toronto Metropolitan University; University of Toronto

Services
- Emergency department: Yes - at Brampton Civic Hospital and Etobicoke General Hospital

Links
- Website: http://www.williamoslerhs.ca
- Lists: Hospitals in Canada

Former logo as William Osler Health Centre

William Osler Health System, formerly William Osler Health Centre, is a hospital network in Ontario, Canada that serves the city of Brampton and northern Etobicoke in Toronto. The network is named for Canadian physician William Osler, one of the four founding professors of Johns Hopkins Hospital and developer of the concept of medical residency.

It has an annual operating budget of nearly $500 million CAD, and is the primary clinical partner of Toronto Metropolitan University's School of Medicine. It is also a community-affiliated hospital of the University of Toronto.

== Hospitals and centres ==
The network consists of two hospitals and one ambulatory care centre:

- Brampton Civic Hospital (established 2007) – a 608-bed hospital in northeast Brampton.
- Etobicoke General Hospital (established 1972) – a 310-bed hospital located in Etobicoke, Toronto
- Peel Memorial Centre for Integrated Health and Wellness (established 2017) - an ambulatory and urgent care centre in central Brampton

=== Former hospitals ===
Georgetown Hospital was previously part of the William Osler Health Centre, but in 2005 it was transferred to Halton Healthcare. Peel Memorial Hospital ceased operation in 2007 and was later superseded by the Peel Memorial Centre.

== Executives ==
Ken White, former Trillium CEO, was appointed "Supervisor", which encompasses the role of both president and CEO as well as chairman of the board, by the Ministry of Health and Long-Term Care in 2007 "…to restore public confidence in the health centre". His term ended in April 2010 when Matthew Anderson became CEO.

== Foundation ==
The William Osler Health System raises funds through the William Osler Health System Foundation. Donors to the foundation include AbbVie, Algoma University, Bell, CIBC, Mercedes-Benz, Omni Television, Pfizer, Prime Asia Television, and Toronto Metropolitan University.

In April 2022, the foundation received a $128,000 donation from Amazon to assist with recovery from the COVID-19 pandemic.
