= Peel Memorial Centre for Integrated Health and Wellness =

- William Osler Health System
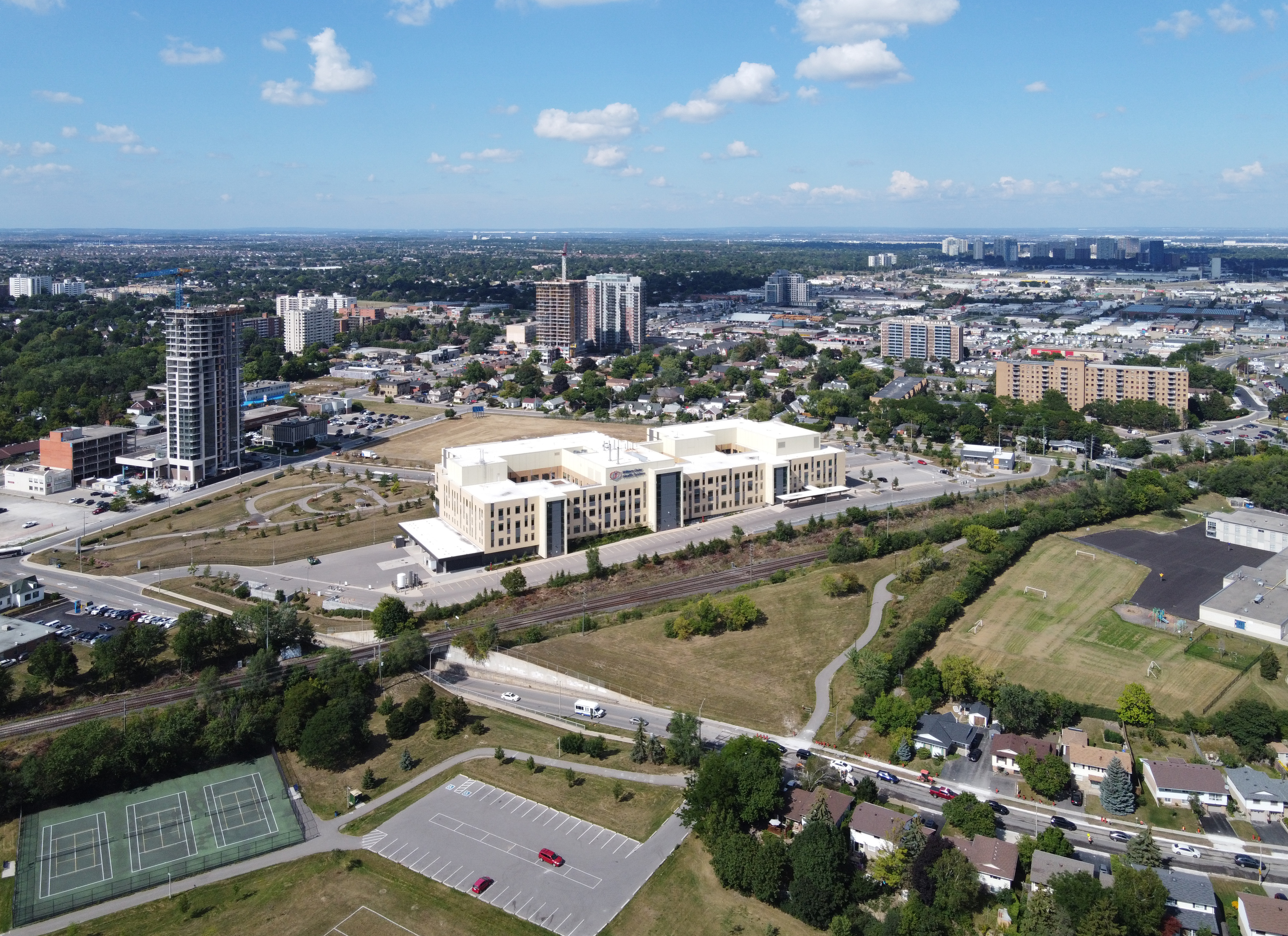

Geography
- Location: Brampton, Peel Region, Ontario, Canada
- Coordinates: 43.69056°N 79.75100°W

Organization
- Care system: Public Medicare (Canada) (OHIP)
- Affiliated university: Toronto Metropolitan University

Services
- Emergency department: No (maybe added at later date)

History
- Former name: Peel Memorial Hospital
- Founded: 2017

Links
- Website: www.williamoslerhs.ca
- Lists: Hospitals in Canada

Peel Memorial Centre for Integrated Health and Wellness is a large ambulatory care facility located in central Brampton, Ontario, opened in 2017. Part of the William Osler Health System, it replaced the Peel Memorial Hospital, which previously stood on the site and closed in 2007.

Peel Memorial Centre is funded by the Central West Local Health Integration Network (LHIN).

On March 26, 2021, the provincial government announced plans to add an in patient wing (250 beds) to the facility and plans to upgrade the centre's status to a hospital including additional services, with an emergency wing to be added later. The hospital will likely have a designation of category E and G, which denotes rehabilitation and chronic care services.
