= Chandrawal-2 =

2012 film

Chandrawal-2 is a Haryanvi language film released on 4 April 2012. It is a sequel to superhit Chandrawal film.

== Production ==
After announcements of the sequel to superhit Chandrawal film, shootings began on 11 October 2011 near Raipur Rani in Panchkula District, Haryana. Due to financial issues, makers, including the lead actress in its first part as co-producer in sequel Usha Sharma borrowed a loan and sold her ornaments.

The film was released on 4 April 2012.
