= Chhatera =

Chhatehra छतैहरा
- Village
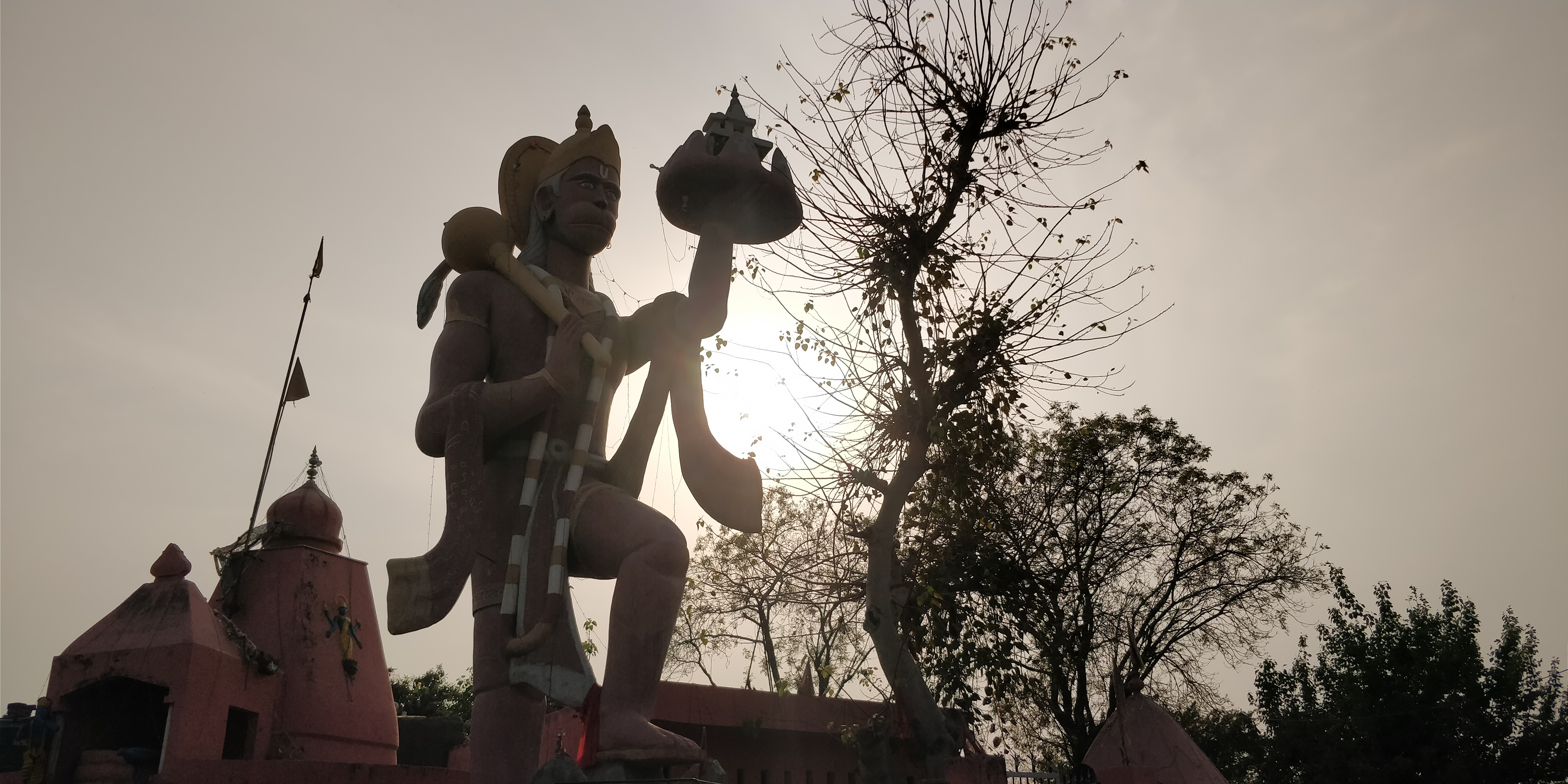
- Hanuman Temple, Chhatehra

- Location in Haryana, Sonipat, India Chhatehra (India)
- Coordinates: 29°14′N 76°42′E
- Country: India
- State: Haryana
- District: Sonipat
- Established: 17th century
- Founded by: Chhattar Singh Sharaya

Government
  - Type: Panchayati Raj
  - Body: Gram Panchayat

Population (2011)
  - Total: 2,647

Languages
  - Official: Hindi
- Time zone: UTC+5:30 (IST)
- PIN: 131306
- Telephone code: 01263
- ISO 3166 code: IN-HR
- Vehicle registration: HR11
- Nearest city: Gohana, Sonipat, Panipat
- Lok Sabha constituency: Sonipat
- Vidhan Sabha constituency: Baroda

Chhatehra is a village located in the Sonipat district of the Indian state of Haryana. It is part of the Gohana tehsil and the Mundlana block, with a population of approximately 5,000 people. The village is situated about 11 kilometers from Gohana and 50 kilometers from Sonipat, the district headquarters.

== History ==
Chhatehra was established in the 17th century by Chhattar Singh Sharaya. It has a deep-rooted cultural heritage, with its history closely tied to the local Jat community, especially those belonging to the Sharaya and Pannu gotras.

== Demographics ==
The village is predominantly inhabited by Jats, with other communities such as the Scheduled Caste (SC) population making up 17.15% of the total. As per the Population Census 2011, Chhatehra (referred to as Chhatera) had a population of 2,647, with 506 families residing in the village. Of the total population, 1,409 were males and 1,238 were females. The official language spoken is Hindi. The village maintains its agricultural roots, with 58% of the workforce engaged in Main Work, primarily as cultivators and agricultural laborers. The literacy rate stood at 74.72%, with male literacy at 83.88% and female literacy at 64.24%. The village has a child population (0-6 years) of 321, making up 12.13% of the total population, and an average sex ratio of 879, matching the Haryana state average. The child sex ratio was 911, which is higher than the state average of 834.

== Governance and administration ==
Chhatehra operates under the Panchayati Raj system, with local governance handled by the Gram Panchayat. The village falls within the Baroda Vidhan Sabha constituency, currently represented by Indu Raj Narwal. It is part of the Sonipat Lok Sabha constituency.

Law enforcement for the area is overseen by the Baroda police station and Butana police chauki.

== Education ==
Chhatehra is home to a Government Senior Secondary School, providing education up to the 12th standard. The school is affiliated with the Haryana Board of School Education and serves the educational needs of students from Chhatehra and neighboring villages.

== Transportation ==
Chhatehra is well connected by road, particularly through the Gohana-Madlauda road. Public transportation and private vehicles provide access to nearby towns like Gohana, Sonipat, and Panipat.

== Facilities ==
The village has basic amenities, including access to local markets, Primary Health Center, and educational institutions. It is governed by the Gram Panchayat, with the village sarpanch playing a significant role in local administration.

== Points of interest ==
- Baba Sheetal Nath – Baba Sheetal Nath was a revered figure in Chhatehra village, Sonipat district, Haryana. Known for his spiritual influence and craftsmanship, Baba Sheetal Nath passed away around 2005. A temple in his honor, the Sheetal Nath Mandir, stands at the main adda (central point) of the village, and a local stadium is also named after him. Villagers hold Baba Sheetal Nath in high regard, often invoking his name when seeking blessings for their endeavors. It is a common belief that if a promise is made in his name, and the desired result is achieved, devotees offer alcohol as a token of gratitude at his temple. Beyond his spiritual role, Baba Sheetal Nath was an exceptional craftsman. He constructed the village's Shiv Mandir and created most of the village's flying images (urtis). He also initiated the building of a 50-foot tall statue of Hanuman, though he was unable to complete it before his passing; other craftsmen finished the work later. Every year, a communal feast (bhandara) is organized in his memory, attracting both villagers and people from surrounding areas. His followers continue to show their devotion by displaying slogans such as "Jai Baba Sheetal Nath" on their bikes, tractors, and other vehicles, symbolizing their deep faith and respect for him.
- Baba Sheetal Nath Stadium – A nearby stadium used for local sports events.
- Asthal – A spiritual site in the village.
- Kandhi Mata Temple – A temple located in proximity to the village.
- Post Office – The village has a local post office that serves its communication needs.

== In popular culture ==
The village of Chhatehra is mentioned in Haryanvi folk music, particularly in the ragni titled "52 Mardo Ki Ragni" by Rajender Kharakiya. In this ragni, he highlights the hardworking nature of the people from Chhatehra and the nearby village of Busana. The lyrics in the ragni are:

"कमाऊं से सब लोग देखे छतैहरा और बुसाने के (Kamaun se sab log dekhe Chhatehra aur Busane ke)"

Translation:

"People recognize that everyone from Chhatehra and Busana are very hardworking."

This line emphasizes the strong work ethic of the people from these two villages. The reference in the ragni reflects the cultural and social reputation of Chhatehra in Haryanvi folk traditions.
