= Prime Asia Television =

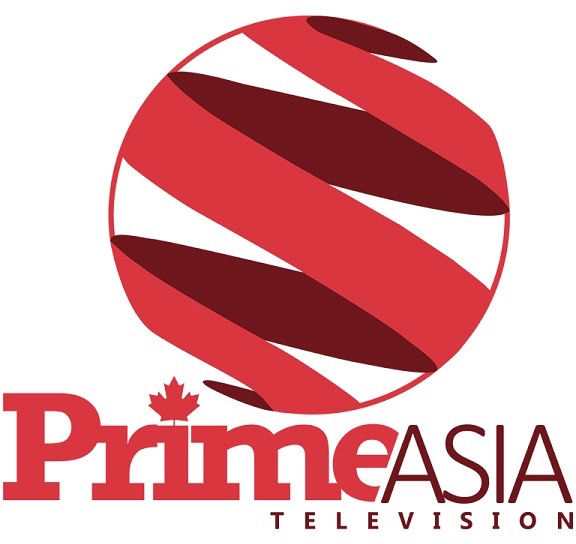
- Type: Private
- Founder: Aman Khatkar
- Headquarters: Surrey, British Columbia, Canada
- Key people: Jatinder Pannu
- Number of employees: 50+
- Website: www.primeasiatv.com

Prime Asia Television is a Canada-based Punjabi-language television network that serves the global Punjabi diaspora. The channel was founded in 2016 by Aman Khatkar.
