= Rajesh Vedprakash =

Indian voice actor

- राजेश वेदप्रकाश
- Born: Rajesh Vedprakash Maingi राजेश वेदप्रकाश मैंगी October 7, 1968 (age 57); Pataudi, India
- Occupations: voice actor; dubbing artist
- Years active: 1990–present

Rajesh Vedprakash (Hindi: राजेश वेदप्रकाश, born as Rajesh Vedprakash Maingi राजेश वेदप्रकाश मैंगी; October 7, 1968) as an Indian voice artist who can speak English, Hindi and Urdu. He is a 1990 batch alumnus of Indian Theater Department, Panjab University, Chandigarh. In 1991 he shifted his base to Mumbai. He anchored live shows, made documentaries, short films and conducted workshops with Partap Sharma. He is a body building promoter and patron in chief of Panchkula Body Building and Fitness Association.

Rajesh Vedprakash is a director and voice trainer. His works include various productions based on social issues like dowry and female foeticide, Panchatantra and Biblical stories. He has to his credit five voices in a single production. He conducts workshops on communication skills and specializes in performing character voices, theatrical trailers, radio spots and lending voice to various television channels.

== Dubbing roles ==
=== Animated series ===
Program title	Original voice	Character	Dub language	Original language	Number of episodes	Original airdate	Dubbed airdate	Notes
Winx Club	Fabrizio Temperini Guido Di Naccio Patrizio Prata	Lord Darkar Valtor / Baltor Ogron	Hindi	Italian	117	1/28/2004- Current		Aired on Cartoon Network and Pogo dubbed in Hindi.
