= Pannu =

Jat clan in India and Pakistan

Pannu is a Sikh family name derived from "a Jat clan from the ancient Pannam dynasty".‌ It is also a sub-caste of Jats.

== Notable people ==
Notable people with the surname, who may or may not be affiliated to the sub-caste, include:

- Tegi Pannu
- Arpit Pannu
- Jatinder Pannu
- Kulwant Singh Pannu
- Raj Pannu
- Sartaj Singh Pannu
- Shankar Pannu
- Taapsee Pannu
