= Gadia Lohar =

Nomadic community of Uttar Pradesh and Madhya Pradesh, India

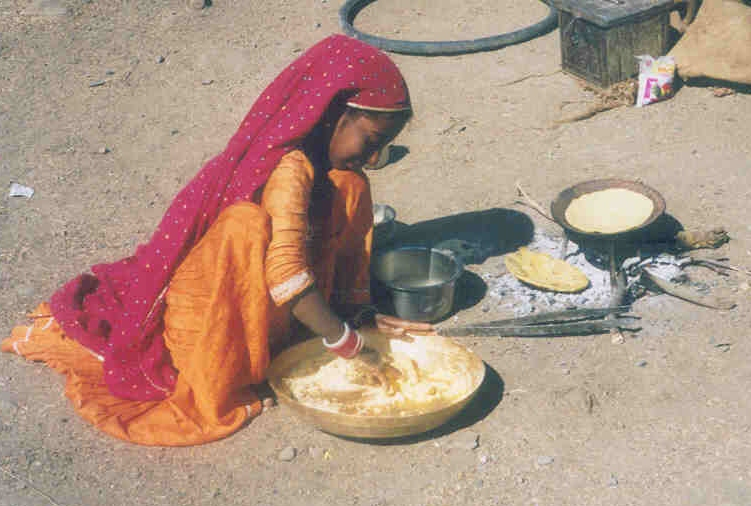
A girl from the Gadia Lohars nomadic tribe of Raibareli, cooking on the outskirts of a village in Raibareli district

Gadia Lohars (also known as Gaduliya Lohars or Rajput Lohar) are a nomadic community of Rajasthan, India. They are also found in the Malwa region of Madhya Pradesh. They are lohar (ironsmith) by profession who move from one place to another on bullock carts, which in Hindi are called gadi, hence the name 'Gadia Lohar'. These Lohars are different from the Lohar clan of Iran, Pakistan and India. They usually make and repair agricultural and household implements.

They claim that their forefathers were in the army of Maharana Pratap of Mewar and trace them to Kshtriya/Rajput origin and hence use Rajput surnames. When Mewar fell to the Mughals, Maharana Pratrap ran to the forest where he met these people who helped him and his family. They pledged never to return to their homeland, never to settle anywhere else, and never to live under a roof until Maharana Pratap won Chittorgarh back. But Maharana Pratap did not win Chittor back and hence the Lohars continue their pledge even today.

Title and Gotra in Gadia Lohar:

1. Parmar
2. Solanki
3. Sisodia
4. Dabhi
5. Devda
6. Borana
7. Kushwaha
8. Chaturvedi
9. Dadich
10. Koshik
11. Tiwari

== Documentaries ==
A documentary on them entitled "Gadia Lohar: A Life and Livelihood in Question?" (Hindi/Mini DV/ 24 minutes / 2005/) was filmed by director Meenakshi Vinay Rai.

Another documentary is India's nomads: The forgotten world of the Gadia Lohar (Netflix, 2020) 52 minutes, by Deana Uppal.

== See also ==
- Maharana pratap singh
- Romani people
