= Jatinder Pannu =

Indian journalist and social activist (born 1954)

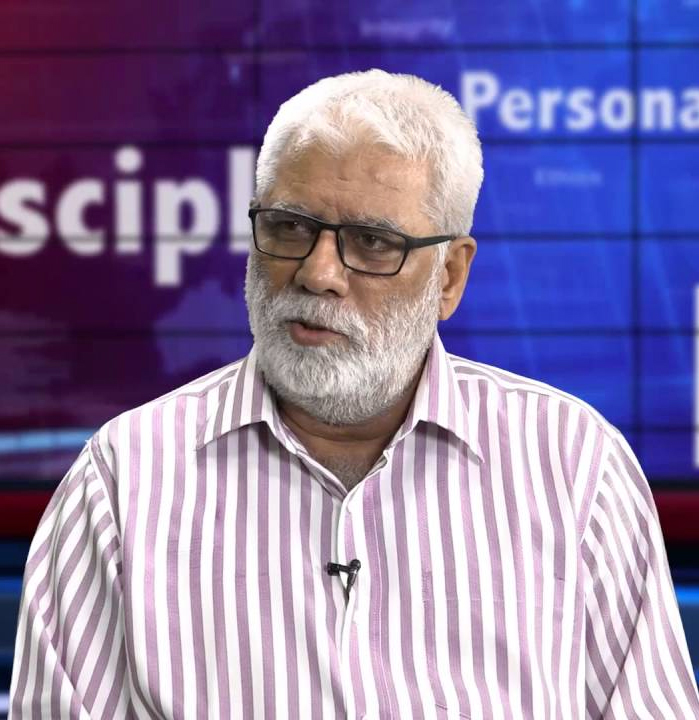
- Jatinder Pannu hosting the talk show on Prime Asia TV in 2017
- Born: Jatinder Singh Pannu; 19 October 1954 (age 71); Village Sakhira Tarn Taran
- Occupation: Journalist
- Known for: Nawan Zamana and Senior journalist in Prime Asia Tv

Jatinder Pannu is a journalist, columnist and social activist from Punjab, India. He is the editor of Nawan Zamana, a political and social newspaper in the Punjabi language published from Jalandhar.

== Prime Asia Television ==
Jatinder Pannu is currently prime host with Prime Asia Television. Most of the viewers of his shows are Punjabi diaspora in Canada, UK, USA, New Zealand, and Australia who watch his shows via YouTube. Prime Asia TV have over 1.5 million subscribers as of April 2020

People say he was close associate of KPS Gill but he denies.
