= Jagat Jakhar =

Indian actor (1956–2011)

Jagat Singh Jakhar
- Born: Jagat Singh Jakhar; 6 October 1956; Sundreti, Jhajjar district, Punjab, India
- Died: 17 December 2011 (aged 55); Chandigarh, India
- Occupation: Actor
- Known for: Chandrawal

Jagat Singh Jakhar (born 6 October 1956) was a Haryanvi film actor. He appeared in a dozen Haryanvi films until his death in 2011. He was the main lead of the largest grossing Haryanvi film, Chandrawal (1984).

== Early life ==
He was born in a village of Sundreti in the Jhajjar district of the state Haryana in 1956. His father Surat Singh Jakhar was a farmer. He spent the early years of his life in his village then went to Rohtak to complete his graduation before going to Haryana Agricultural University for higher studies to graduate as a veterinary surgeon.

== Career ==
Jakhar appeared in around a dozen films during his career. He had most success in the film Chandrawal where he played a doomed lover. The film went on to break many box office records. Shortly before his death he was filming a television serial called Sapne.

== Death ==
Jagat Jakhar died in the PGI hospital of Chandigarh at the age of 55 on 17 December 2011 due to a liver infection. He was reportedly in hospital for treatment related to his liver for a few days. On 17 December 2011, his funeral services were held.

== Selected filmography ==
- Muklawa
- Shanichar
- Chadro
- Chandrawal
- Chandra Kiran
- Sapne (TV serial)
- Anpadh Jat (unreleased)
