= Brampton Civic Hospital =

Coordinates: 43.7473°N 79.7432°W

- William Osler Health System
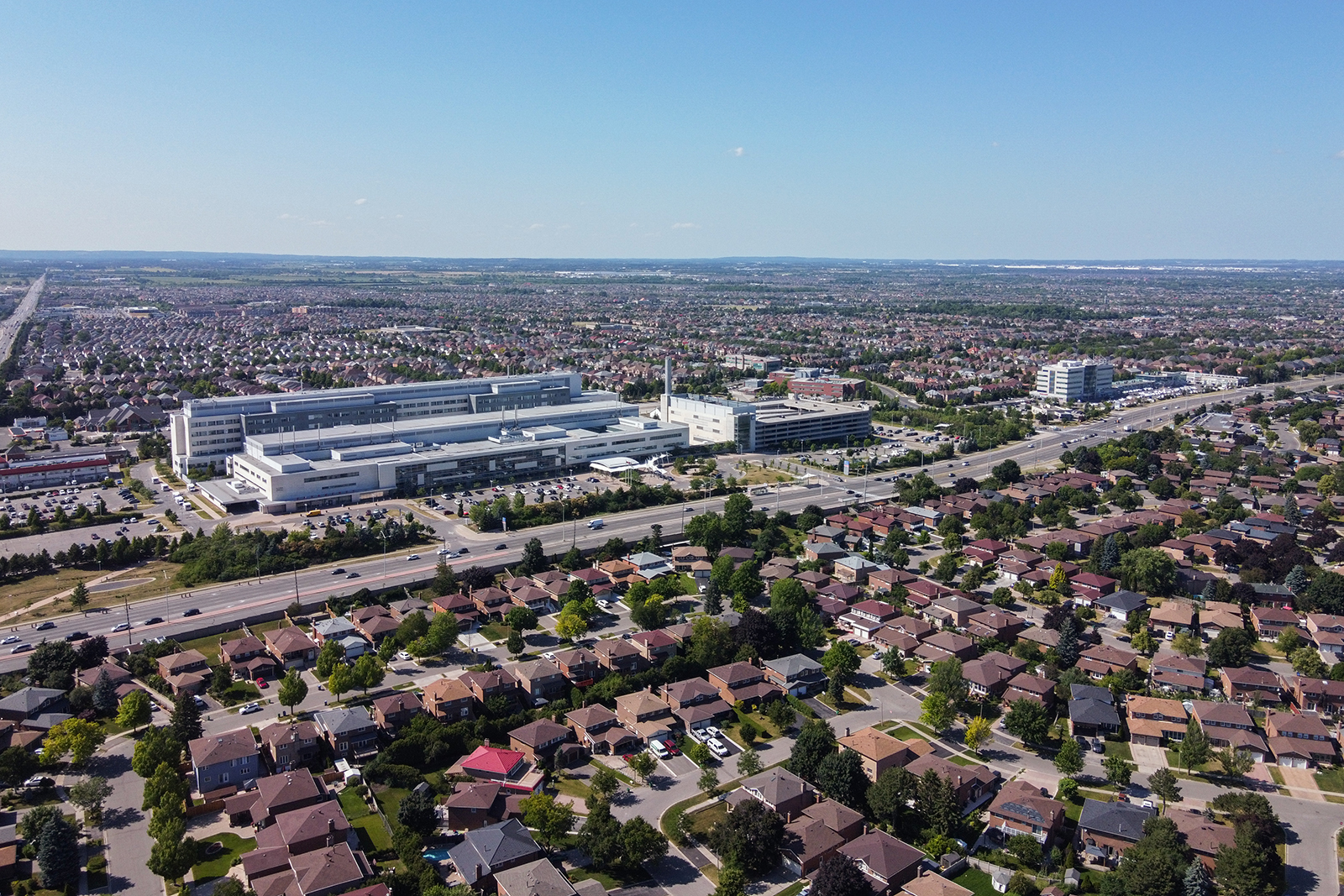
- Brampton Civic Hospital

- Location in Ontario

Geography
- Location: Brampton, Peel Region, Ontario, Canada

Organization
- Care system: Public Medicare (Canada) (OHIP)
- Type: District General
- Affiliated university: McMaster University; Toronto Metropolitan University

Services
- Emergency department: Yes
- Beds: 608

History
- Founded: 2007

Links
- Website: http://www.williamoslerhs.ca/about-osler/osler's-facilities/brampton-civic-hospital
- Lists: Hospitals in Canada
- Other links: Peel Memorial Hospital

Brampton Civic Hospital is an acute care hospital in Brampton, Ontario and part of the William Osler Health System. It is a community teaching hospital for McMaster University's Michael G. DeGroote School of Medicine and Toronto Metropolitan University's School of Medicine.

== History ==
The 608-bed hospital was designed by Parkin Architects Limited in joint venture with Adamson Associates and built by a joint venture of Carillion and EllisDon. The Brampton Civic Hospital is one of Canada's first public hospitals to be designed, built, financed, and maintained under a private-public partnership. It opened in 2007 and replaced the Peel Memorial Hospital which previously served Brampton and the surrounding area.

The south tower was named the Bikram S. Dhillon & Family South Tower in 2023, for donors.

== Operations ==
Brampton Civic Hospital currently serves approximately 500,000 residents in Brampton and the surrounding areas. The facility can accommodate 80,000 emergency patient visits and 201,000 ambulatory care visits annually. The hospital has 4,100 employees.
