= Usha Sharma =

Indian actress and dancer

- Born: Haryana, India
- Other name: Usha Sharma Prabhakar
- Occupations: Actor, dancer, producer
- Spouse: Devi Shankar Prabhakar (?-2005)

Usha Sharma is an Indian actress and dancer. She is best known for playing the title character in the Haryanvi film Chandrawal. She serves as the president of Haryana Kala Parishad (The Haryana Arts Council) and is an executive member of Haryana Pradesh Congress Committee.

== Life and career ==
Sharma was born in Haryana, India. From an early age she learned classical and folk dance, studying with Birju Maharaj, Kundan Lal Gangani and Maya Rao. During primary school she danced for Jawaharlal Nehru. Sharma married poet Devi Shankar Prabhakar who later decided to become a film producer. He wrote the script for the 1984 film Chandrawal and cast his wife as the leading lady. Sharma also choreographed the film, drawing on her dance training. The film was a financial success, and remains the highest grossing Haryanvi film to date. The two made several less successful Haryanavi films together. Sharma later became the director of the Haryana Kala Parishad, an organization that promotes Haryanavi culture. After her husband died in 2005, Sharma decided to produce a sequel to Chandrawal, a project he had been planning for some years.

== Filmography ==
- Bahurani (1982)
- Chandrawal (1984) ... Chandrawal
- Lado Basanti (1985) ... Basanti
- Phool Badan (1986)
- Jatni (1991)
- Chandrawal 2 (2015)
