= Uttar Kumar =

Indian actor

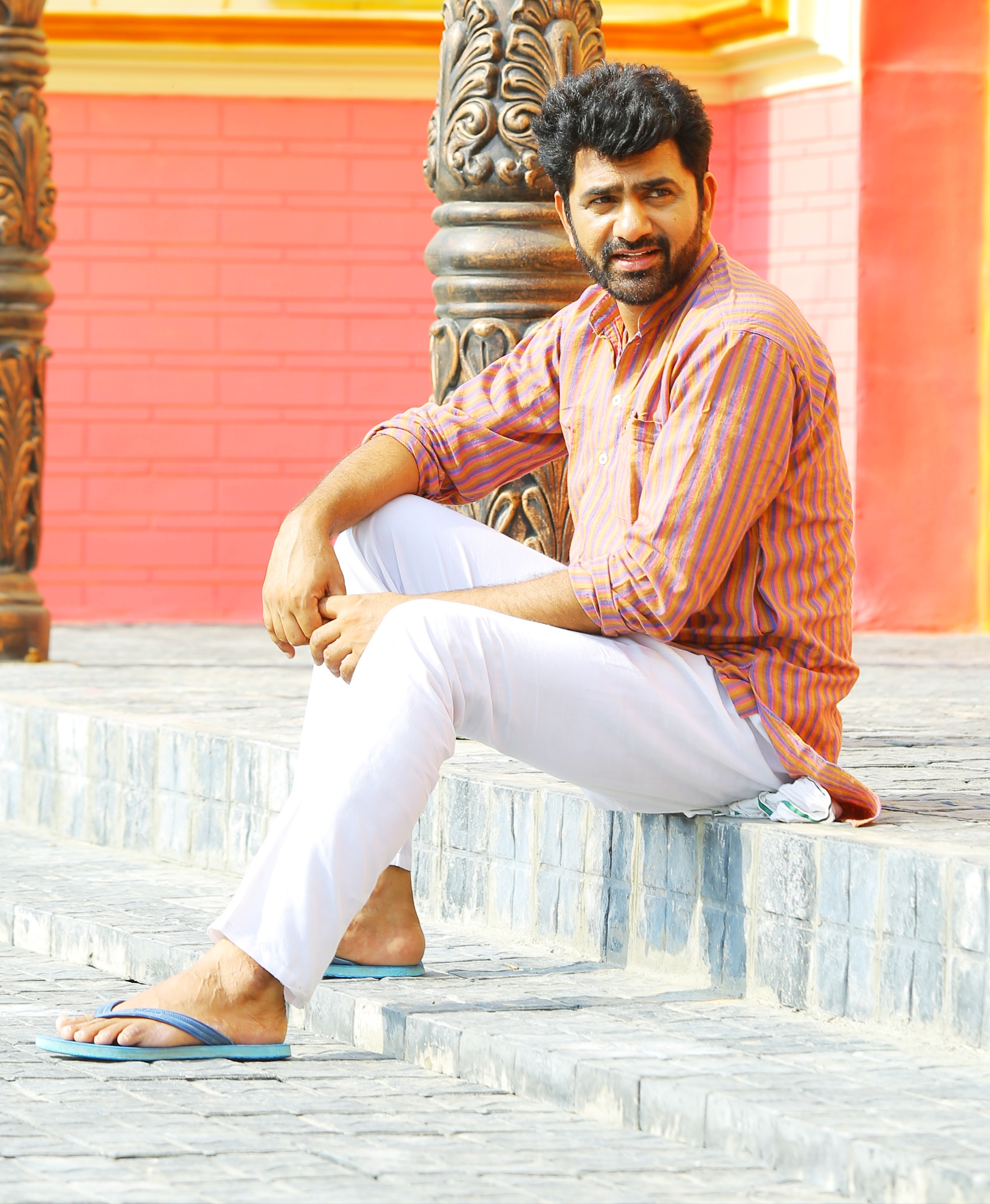
- Born: 7 October 1973 (age 53); Ghaziabad district, Uttar Pradesh, India
- Occupations: Actor, film director, writer
- Years active: 2003–present
- Notable work: Dhakad Chhora

Uttar Kumar is an Indian actor, writer, director, who mainly works in Haryanvi films. He has acted in more than forty films including Dhakar Chhora released in 2004.

== Early life ==
Kumar was born on 7 October 1973 in Ghaziabad district of Uttar Pradesh. He studied acting from the Asian Academy of Film and Television.

== Career ==
Uttar Kumar made his debut with the film 'Baawli', which was released in 2003. However, the film turned out to be flop. Kumar's film Dhakad Chhora (2004) become a blockbuster hit. He is known for his stage name Dhakad Chhora.

== Controversy ==
In 2025, Kumar was arrested in Ghaziabad on charges of raping a co-actress.

== Filmography ==
Key
| † | Denotes films that have not yet been released |

=== Films ===
- 2003, Baavli
- 2004, Dhakad Chhora
- 2004, Karamveer
- 2004, Mhara Gaon Mhara Desh
- 2005, Tadap
- 2005, Nikamma
- 2005, Khardoo
- 2005, Kaun Haqdaar
- 2005, Akad
- 2006, Saperan
- 2006, Khadtal
- 2006, Karuna
- 2006, Dhouns
- 2006, Bedhadak
- 2007, Mannu Dhakad Man
- 2007, Senapati
- 2007, Dhakad Chhora 2
- 2007, Dakka
- 2007, Chhat Pe
- 2007, Asar
- 2008, Jhalak
- 2008, Ghamasaan
- 2008, Besabar
- 2008, Ankush 2
- 2009, Natkhat
- 2011, Hum do Bhagode
- 2012, Laat Sahab
- 2014, Katto
- 2014, Kunba
- 2014, Dear Vs Bear
- 2016, Khardoo 2
- 2016, Ye Kaisa Pal Do Pal Ka Pyar
- 2016, Asar 2
- 2017, Kunwar Sahab
- 2017, Shaan
- 2017, Dhakad Lover
- 2018, Akad 2
- 2018, Vikas ki Bahu
- 2018, Baanjh
- 2018, Mahasangram
- 2019, Saadgi
- 2019, Chowkidaar
- 2019, Master
- 2019, Aasra
- 2019, Fazzeta
- 2019, Jhamela
- 2019, Chandro ka Devar
- 2019, Nikhdoo
- 2019, Alajh Palajh
- 2020, Chhakda
- 2020, Muddaa
- 2020, Joda Thath Ka
- 2020, Deriwala
- 2021, Pakad
- 2021, Raja
- 2021, Chacha Bhatija
- 2021, Rampal havaldar
- 2022, Badda
- 2024, Saath
- 2026, Kikkar

=== Television ===
- 2026, Mahadev & Sons as Sikander
