= Etobicoke General Hospital =

Hospital in Toronto, Ontario, Canada

- William Osler Health System
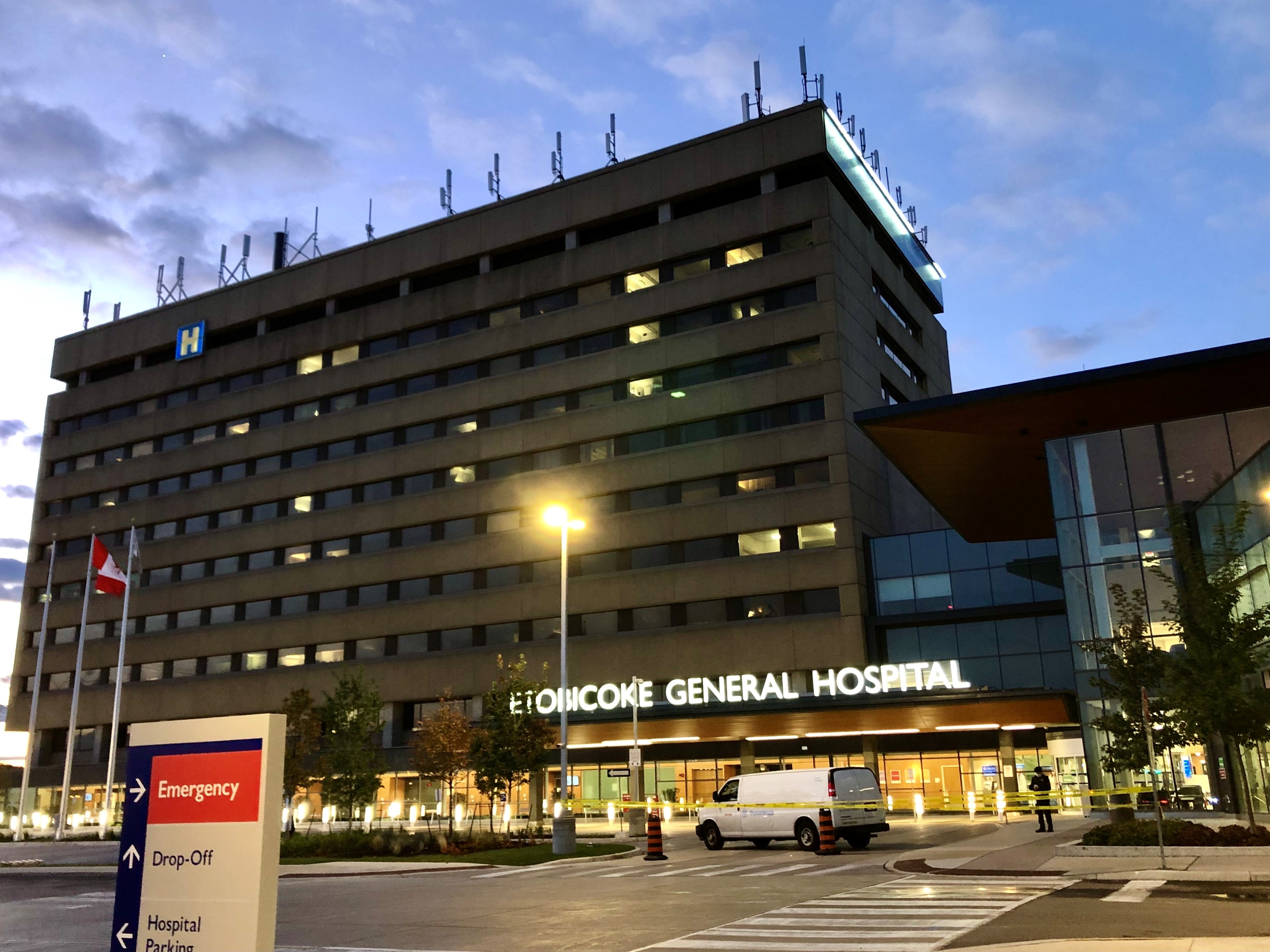
- At left, the original hospital building. At right, the new patient tower opened in June 2019.

Geography
- Location: 101 Humber College Boulevard; Toronto, Ontario; M9V 1R8
- Coordinates: 43°43′46″N 79°35′53″W

Organisation
- Care system: Medicare
- Type: Specialist
- Affiliated university: Toronto Metropolitan University

Services
- Emergency department: Yes
- Beds: 310
- Speciality: General Surgery, Urology, ENT, Orthopedics, Diagnostic and Interventional Radiology, Cardiology, Respirology, ICU/CCU, Palliative Care

History
- Founded: 1972

Links
- Website: www.williamoslerhs.ca

The Etobicoke General Hospital is a community hospital in the Etobicoke district of Toronto, Ontario, Canada and is part of William Osler Health System. The hospital primarily serves Etobicoke, as well as the neighbouring cities of Brampton, Mississauga, and Caledon. It is the closest acute care hospital to Toronto Pearson International Airport, specializing in mass casualty events and crisis response.

== Overview ==
The hospital has 262 hospital beds and serves over 230 000 residents in Etobicoke and the surrounding areas. Annually, the hospital has over 50,270 outpatients, 15,785 inpatients, and has 70,000 emergency visits. It employs 1026 health care professionals, and has more than 200 affiliated family physicians and specialists. It also has 400 dedicated volunteers including a wide variety of co-operative education students. It is a member of the William Osler Health System group of hospitals.

== History ==
The original hospital building was opened in 1972, following governmental investment and a major donations push led by a group of local volunteers. Although rearrangement and renovation followed over the decades since the hospital's opening, further expansion would occur more than 40 years later.

In 2018, Osler opened the Etobicoke Wellness Centre (EWC). The Wellness Centre represents a partnership between the hospital and various external partners, such as independent physicians and private businesses. It houses a number of Etobicoke General outpatient services, such as a fracture clinic, a pre-anesthesia care unit, diagnostic imaging, a diabetes education centre, and a 15-machine hemodialysis unit, newly opened in April 2020. The remainder of the building is dedicated to private clinics and businesses, such as LifeLabs.

Immediately following the opening of the Etobicoke Wellness Centre, a new patient tower (nicknamed the "west wing") was opened in June 2019. The patient tower houses a new emergency department, ICU, birthing unit, neonatal ICU, and a number of outpatient clinics.
