= Laado =

- Directed by: Ashwini Chaudhary
- Written by: Ashwini Chaudhary; Surendra Chaudhary
- Produced by: Kumud Chaudhary
- Starring: Ashutosh Rana; Arundhati; Arun Bali; Rajendra Gupta
- Cinematography: Ashok Behal
- Music by: Lalit Sen
- Release date: 5 October 2000
- Country: India
- Language: Haryanvi

Laado (transl. Lovely daughter) is a 2000 Indian Haryanvi-language romance film directed and co-written by Ashwini Chaudhary, starring Ashutosh Rana and Arundhati.

The film's music was composed by Lalit Sen and released on 5 October 2000.

== Plot ==
Urmi is a young bride who has just got married. She is left behind in the village with her in-laws while her husband, Arvind, goes off to work in the big city. Her husband's cousin Inder falls in love with her and proposes. Unable to cope with her husband's neglect and her in-laws' pressure to have a child, Urmi begins a relationship with Inder. When their relationship is exposed, Urmi must deal not only with her family's accusations, but also with her lover's cowardice. Found guilty by the local village court, Urmi appeals to a court made up of all the village heads, where her husband's neglect and her lover's cowardice are exposed.

== Cast ==
- Arundhati as Urmi
- Ashutosh Rana as Inder Dahiya
- Arun Bali as Chaudhary Nafe Singh
- Rajendra Gupta as Chaudhary Dilawar Singh
- Sri Vallabh Vyas as Chaudhary Jorawar Singh

== Soundtrack ==
Track#	Title	Singer(s)
1	"Banna Giri Chhuaare"	Udit Narayan & Poornima (singer)
2	"Saaman Laharya Re"	Udit Narayan & Kavita Krishnamurthy
3	"Deewani Main Deewani"	Ashok Masti
4	"Paani Aali"	Rajendra Kharkiya
5	"He Ramji"	Alka Yagnik
6	"Aadhi Si Raat"	Poornima (singer)
7	"Mhaari Gali Me Sapera"	Harsha & Poornima (singer)

== Awards ==
- Won the Indira Gandhi Award for Best Debut Film of a Director at the 2000 National Film Awards. This was the first time a Haryanvi movie won a national award.
