= Arun Bali =

Indian television actor (1942–2022)

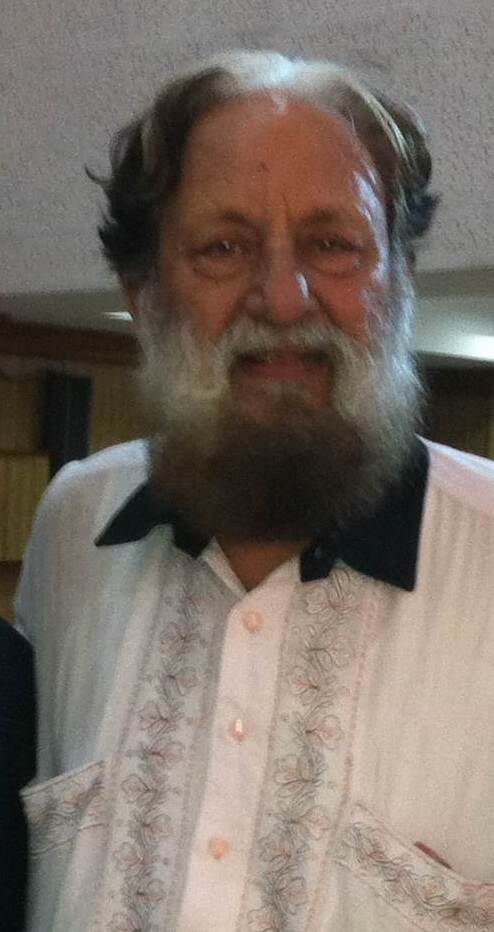
- Born: 23 December 1942; Lahore, Punjab, British India (present-day Punjab, Pakistan)
- Died: 7 October 2022 (aged 79); Mumbai, Maharashtra, India
- Occupation: Actor
- Years active: 1988–2022
- Height: 6 ft 4 in (1.93 m)
- Relatives: Ankush Bali (son); Itishree Bali (daughter); Pragati Bali (daughter)

Arun Bali (23 December 1942 – 7 October 2022) was an Indian actor who has worked in numerous films and television series.

== Career ==
Bali played the part of Maharaj Porus in the 1991 period drama Chanakya, Kunwar Singh in the Doordarshan soap opera Swabhimaan and the Chief Minister of undivided Bengal, Huseyn Shaheed Suhrawardy, in the controversial and critically acclaimed 2000 film Hey Ram. In the 2000s, he became known for his "grandfatherly" roles like that of Harshvardhan Wadhwa in Kumkum – Ek Pyara Sa Bandhan which garnered him popular awards.

In 2001, the prominent writer, actor and director Lekh Tandon counted Bali amongst his favourite actors.

== Death ==
He died at his home in suburban Mumbai on 7 October 2022, at the age of 79, following treatment for Myasthenia gravis.

== Filmography ==
Year	Film	Role	Notes
1988	Uttejna		
1988	Maati Mere Desh Ki		
1991	Visakhi	Dharam Singh	
1991	Saugandh	Hari Singh	
1992	Heer Ranjha		
1992	Yalgaar	Home Minister Udaynarayan	
1992	Raju Ban Gaya Gentleman		
1992	Aahuti		
1993	Phool Aur Angaar	Judge Chaudhary	
1993	Kayda Kanoon		
1993	Khalnayak	Police Commissioner	
1993	Izzat Ki Roti	Advocate	
1993	Karamati Coat	Mr. Irani	
1993	Aaja Meri Jaan		
1994	Nasibo	Dyaal Singh	
1994	Aa Gale Lag Jaa	Mohanlal	
1995	Qahar	Tejpratap Singh	
1995	Policewala Gunda	Central Government Minister	
1995	Sabse Bada Khiladi		
1995	Ram Jaane	Paowala Baba	
1996	Jorawar	Gajjan Singh	
1996	Rajkumar		
1996	Masoom	Police Commissioner	
1996	Return of Jewel Thief	Advocate	
1998	Dand Nayak	Police Commissioner	
1998	Satya	Home Secretary Mr. Sharma	
1998	Guru Govind Singh		
1998	Dildaara	Barkat	
1999	Amrita		
1999	A. K. 47	Police Commissioner Mr. Bhatnagar	
2000	Hey Ram	Shaheed Suhrawardy	
2000	Sant Gyaneshwar		
2000	Laado	Nafe Singh	
2000	Shikari		
2002	Aankhen	Mr. Goenka	
2002	Om Jai Jagadish	Anil Khanna	
2003	Armaan	Gulshan Kapoor's Assistant	
2003	Zameen	Pakistani Home Minister	
2004	Veer Zaara	Abdul Malik Shirazi	
2006	Mere Jeevan Saathi	Mr. Behl	
2006	Lage Raho Munnabhai	Second Innings Resident 3	
2008	Sat Sri Akal	Mr. Singh	
2008	Gumnaam – The Mystery	Dayal Singh	
2009	Munde U.K. De	Gurdeet Singh	
2009	Apni Boli Apna Des	Arjun Singh	
2009	3 Idiots	Shyamaldas Chanchad	Cameo
2011	Ready	Guruji	
2012	Barfi!	Mr. Chatterjee	
2012	OMG – Oh My God!	Good Sadhu	
2013	Policegiri	Minister	
2014	Punjab 1984	Datshan Singh Poonpuri	
2014	Kaum De Heere		
2014	Sonali Cable	Old Sikh Man	
2014	PK	Elderly Sikh man in a 5-Star Delhi Hotel	
2015	I Love Desi	Simran's Father	
2015	Utopia		
2015	Bhaag Johnny	Acharyaji	
2016	Airlift	Mr. Kohli	
2016	Baaghi	Colonel Samarjeet Singh (Voice)	
2016	1920 London	Guruji	
2016	Once Upon a Time in Amritsar	Gurtej's father	
2018	Punjab Singh	Taya	
2018	Baaghi 2	Gurudwara Purohit	
2018	Manmarziyaan	Mr. Bagga	
2018	Kedarnath	Chief Purohit	
2019	Kaake Da Viyah	Magistrate	
2019	Phir Ussi Mod Par		
2019	Cypher	Monk	
2019	Panipat	Ala Singh	
2021	Suswagatam Khushamadeed	Dadaji	
2022	Radhe Shyam	Mr. Rajput	
2022	Samrat Prithviraj	Arnoraja	
2022	Match Of Life	Ekamber's grandfather	
2022	Laal Singh Chaddha	Old Sikh man in the Train	
2022	Goodbye	Gayatri & Geeta's father	
2023	Dunki	Manu's older father	Posthumous release

=== Television ===
Year	Serial	Role
1988	Dil Dariya	Mohan Singh
1989–1999	Doosra Kewal	Kirpal Singh
1991	Neem Ka Ped	Zameen Miya
1991	Chanakya	Maharaj Porus
1994	The Great Maratha	Maharaj Alamgir II
1994	The Great Maratha	Mansoor Shah Baba
1996	Aahat	Michael D'Mello
1996–1997	Aarohan	Karan Khurana
1997	Om Namah Shivay	Raja Himanchal
1997–1998	Shaktimaan	Dayal Chopra
1996–1998	Itihaas - TV Series	Sheetal’s Husband
1999–2001	Suraag – The Clue	Various characters
2001–2005	Des Mein Niklla Hoga Chand	Preetam Singh Kent
2002–2009	Kumkum – Ek Pyara Sa Bandhan	Harshvardhan Wadhwa
2006–2007	Woh Rehne Waali Mehlon Ki	Vikrantraj Parashar
2012	I Luv My India	Premnnath Sethi
2012	Devon Ke Dev...Mahadev	Maharaj Vajranga
2016–2017	P.O.W. – Bandi Yuddh Ke	Harpal Singh
