= Thana Khurd, Sonipat =

Thana Khurd
- City
- Nickname: Chhota Thana
- Location in Haryana, India Thana Khurd (India)
- Coordinates: 28.89°N 76.95°E
- Country: India
- Region: North India
- State: Haryana
- District: Sonipat
- Tehsil: Kharkhoda
- Elevation: 224.15 m (735.4 ft)

Population
  - Total: 2,886

Languages
  - Official: Hindi
  - Second Official: Haryanvi
- Time zone: UTC+5.30 (Indian Standard Time)
- PIN: 131402
- ISO 3166 code: IN-HR
- Sex Ratio: 1.02 ♂/♀
- Literacy: 78.57%
- Website: www.sonipat.nic.in

Thana Khurd is a village in Kharkhoda, Sonipat district in the state of Haryana, India. It is situated 6km away from sub-district headquarter Kharkhoda and 21km away from district headquarter Sonipat.

== Geography ==
Thana Khurd is located at 28.89°N to 76.95°E. It has an average elevation of 224.15 meters above sea level (735.4 feet). The total area of Thana Khurd is 557 hectares.

== Community ==
Thana Khurd was founded by Naraian Singh Chauhan who was the brother of Tej Singh who was the founder of Gohana.

Thana Khurd village features a significant presence of the Rajput community, specifically those belonging to the Chauhan clan. For generations, the Chauhans have been deeply embedded in the local administration, land ownership, and social hierarchy of the region.

=== Origins and the 36 Villages ===
The Chauhans of Thana Khurd do not exist in isolation; they are a vital node in a much larger, historically significant network of 36 Chauhan Rajput villages scattered across the Sonipat district. The ancestry of this sprawling network is traced back to the city of Gohana, which acts as the foundational capital and regional epicenter for the clan. Historical records indicate Gohana was established by the Chauhan leader, Rana Tej Singh Chauhan.

This collective of 36 villages is strategically organized into two geographic clusters. A dense concentration of 24 villages surrounds the historical base of Gohana. The other 12 form an unbroken geographic corridor stretching from the Delhi border—anchored by the nearby town of Kundli, which is itself recognized as a major Rajput stronghold—all the way to Murthal, which caps the end of this belt. Thana Khurd is woven directly into this specific regional corridor.

Throughout the Sonipat district, these Chauhan Rajputs predominantly use Rana as their surname, a custom proudly maintained in settlements spanning from Kundli till Murthal. This title is a direct nod to their Gohana roots, signifying their noble heritage and historical autonomy as headmen within the wider Chauhan lineage.

=== Zaildari System and Main Villages ===
While Thana Khurd remains a crucial part of this agrarian fabric, the most dominant Chauhan villages in the immediate area are Murthal, Kundli, Nahri, Kumashpur, Khewra, Jakhauli and many more. Unlike traditional panchayats, these primary villages historically managed the surrounding territories through the Zaildar system. Zaildars functioned as regional feudal authorities, tasked with overseeing vast agricultural estates, gathering revenue, and upholding local law and order.

The demographic and administrative weight of these nodal villages was cemented by their respective Zaildars:

- Murthal anchors the 12-village corridor and stands today as the most populous Rajput-dominated village in Sonipat, with a Chauhan population nearing 18,000. Its historical foundation and governance are credited to Zaildar Rana Malhan Singh Chauhan.
- Jakhauli operated as another massive regional power center and was historically commanded by the influential Zaildar Rana Harphul Singh.
