= Khewra, Sonipat =

Coordinates: 28°57′53″N 77°7′34″E

Khewra is a village in the Sonipat district of Haryana, India. It is located 12 kilometres (7.5 mi) east of Sonipat. Khewra is an estate separately assessed for land-revenue as defined by the Punjab Land Revenue Act of 1967; as such, it shares boundaries with several other revenue estates, specifically Paldi, Paladi, Palri Kalan and Jajal. Khewra shares the Postal Index Number 131021 with several other localities in Sonipat: Bahalgarh, Baroli, Deepalpur, Liwaspur, and Qumaspur.

This locality does not appear in The Imperial Gazetteer of India, published in the early 20th century; rather, the only "Khewra" reference is to Khewra, Punjab.

== History ==
According to local traditions and genealogical accounts, the village was founded by Khet Singh Chauhan, who was a grandson of Tej Singh, the Rajput chieftain traditionally credited with founding Gohana. The settlement developed as an agrarian village under the leadership of the Chauhan Rajputs.

== Communities ==
The village is socially dominated by Chauhan Rajputs, who historically formed the principal landholding community of the village. Members of this community traditionally use the surname Rana, a title associated with Rajput chieftains and feudal authority.

Historically, the Chauhan Rajputs of Khewra held the position of zaildar in the region and exercised administrative authority over surrounding villages. Their influence historically extended to areas of present-day Jhajjar district.

=== Origins and the 36 Villages ===
The Chauhans of Khewra do not exist in isolation; they are a vital node in a much larger, historically significant network of 36 Chauhan Rajput villages scattered across the Sonipat district. The ancestry of this sprawling network is traced back to the city of Gohana, which acts as the foundational capital and regional epicenter for the clan. Historical records indicate Gohana was established by the Chauhan leader, Rana Tej Singh Chauhan.

This collective of 36 villages is strategically organized into two geographic clusters. A dense concentration of 12 villages surrounds the historical base of Gohana. The other 24 form an unbroken geographic corridor stretching from the Delhi border—anchored by the nearby town of Kundli, which is itself recognized as a major Rajput stronghold—all the way to Murthal, which caps the end of this belt. Khewra is woven directly into this specific regional corridor.

Throughout the Sonipat district, these Chauhan Rajputs predominantly use Rana as their surname, a custom proudly maintained in settlements spanning from Kundli till Murthal. This title is a direct nod to their Gohana roots, signifying their noble heritage and historical autonomy as headmen within the wider Chauhan lineage.

=== Zaildari System and Main Villages ===
While Khewra remains a crucial part of this agrarian fabric, the most dominant Chauhan villages in the immediate area are Murthal, Kundli, Nahri, Kumashpur, Thana Khurd, Jakhauli and many more. Unlike traditional panchayats, these primary villages historically managed the surrounding territories through the Zaildar system. Zaildars functioned as regional feudal authorities, tasked with overseeing vast agricultural estates, gathering revenue, and upholding local law and order.

The demographic and administrative weight of these nodal villages was cemented by their respective Zaildars:

- Murthal anchors the 24-village corridor and stands today as the most populous Rajput-dominated village in Sonipat, with a Chauhan population nearing 18,000. Its historical foundation and governance are credited to Zaildar Rana Malhan Singh Chauhan.
- Jakhauli operated as another massive regional power center and was historically commanded by the influential Zaildar Rana Harphul Singh.

== Demographics ==
According to the 2011 Census of India, Khewara village had a total population of 9,192 living in 1,667 households. Of the total population, 5,013 were males and 4,179 were females.

Children aged 0–6 years numbered 1,203, representing about 13% of the total population. The village had a sex ratio of 834 females per 1,000 males and a child sex ratio of 751.

The overall literacy rate of the village was 77.66%. Male literacy stood at 85.48%, while female literacy was 68.41%.

In terms of social composition, Scheduled Castes constituted 1,322 individuals (about 14.4%) of the total population, while no Scheduled Tribe population was reported.
