= Kumashpur =

Village in the Sonipat District of Haryana

Kumashpur, also spelled Kumaspur and Kumaspura, is a village within Municipal Corporation of Sonipat in Sonipat district of Haryana state in India. It is 11 km from Sonipat Junction railway station, 45 km from Maharana Pratap Inter State Bus Terminus at Kashmiri Gate, Delhi, and 190 km from Chandigarh on NH1 Grand Trunk Road.

== Etymology ==
Kumashpur is a village traditionally associated with the Rajput community, particularly members of the Chauhan clan. The village is believed to be named after Kaushal Singh Chauhan, an early ancestor or prominent figure from the Chauhan lineage who established or settled the area. Over time, Kumashpur developed as a settlement primarily inhabited by families of this Rajput clan.

== Community ==
Kumashpur village has a significant presence of the Rajput community. Specifically those of Chauhan clan. Historically, the Chauhan’s have played an important role in the region, with a long-standing dominance and influence in the local administration and social structures.

=== History ===
The Chauhan of Kumashpur have been known for their military prowess and landholdings. Over the centuries, they have been a prominent community in the region. They belong to the Rajput community.

The Chauhans of Kumashpur have historically held a prominent position in the Sonipat region. They were known for their role as Zaildars, a title associated with local feudal lords who managed land and maintained law and order in the area. This community's influence extended over a large part of the region, particularly during the feudal era.

The Chauhans of Kumashpur also use the title "Rana" as their surname, a practice rooted in their historical association with the Jundla and Gohana estate, where they served as head villages under the feudal lordship system. This title signifies their noble lineage and their role as leaders within the broader Chauhan Rajput clan.

=== Origins and the 36 Villages ===
The Chauhans of Kumashpur do not exist in isolation; they are a vital node in a much larger, historically significant network of 36 Chauhan Rajput villages scattered across the Sonipat district. The ancestry of this sprawling network is traced back to the city of Gohana, which acts as the foundational capital and regional epicenter for the clan. Historical records indicate Gohana was established by the Chauhan leader, Rana Tej Singh Chauhan.

This collective of 36 villages is strategically organized into two geographic clusters. A dense concentration of 12 villages surrounds the historical base of Gohana. The other 24 form an unbroken geographic corridor stretching from the Delhi border—anchored by the nearby town of Kundli, which is itself recognized as a major Rajput stronghold—all the way to Murthal, which caps the end of this belt. Kumashpur is woven directly into this specific regional corridor.

Throughout the Sonipat district, these Chauhan Rajputs predominantly use Rana as their surname, a custom proudly maintained in settlements spanning from Kundli till Murthal. This title is a direct nod to their Gohana roots, signifying their noble heritage and historical autonomy as headmen within the wider Chauhan lineage.

=== Zaildari System and Main Villages ===
While Kumashpur remains a crucial part of this agrarian fabric, the most dominant Chauhan villages in the immediate area are Murthal, Kundli, Nahri, Khewra, Jakhauli and many more. Unlike traditional panchayats, these primary villages historically managed the surrounding territories through the Zaildar system. Zaildars functioned as regional feudal authorities, tasked with overseeing vast agricultural estates, gathering revenue, and upholding local law and order.

The demographic and administrative weight of these nodal villages was cemented by their respective Zaildars:

- Murthal anchors the 24-village corridor and stands today as the most populous Rajput-dominated village in Sonipat, with a Chauhan population nearing 18,000. Its historical foundation and governance are credited to Zaildar Rana Malhan Singh Chauhan.
- Jakhauli operated as another massive regional power center and was historically commanded by the influential Zaildar Rana Harphul Singh.

== Chauhan of Kumashpur ==
The Chauhans of Kumashpur were historically important figures in the Sonipat region. They were known as Zaildar, a title associated with feudal lords who managed land and maintained order in the region.
