= P.G. College (Gohana) =

College in Haryana, India

Coordinates: 29.1395956°N 76.6940144°E

Govt. P.G.College, Gohana, Haryana, India is situated in Gohana Sub-Division near Court and Tehsil Office on Civil Road. The college is affiliated with Maharishi Dayanand University, Rohtak. There is a separate wing which is only for girls. In October 2012, a new branch of the college was granted to open in Barota village (6 km away from Gohana).The college is graded B+ by NAAC.

== Courses offered ==
Courses offered in this college are B.A., B.Sc., B.Com., B.Com.(Computer Application), BBA and M.Com.
