= Jakhauli, Sonipat =

Coordinates: 29°40′N 76°26′E

Jakhauli is a village of in the city of Sonipat in Haryana.

According to a census in 2011, there were 1,460 families residing in the village. The total population of the village was 8,259, out of which 4,388 were males and 3,871 females. Children within the age range 0–6 years constituted 12.87% (1,063) of the total population.

The average sex ratio of Jakhauli village is 882, which is higher than the Haryana state average of 879. On the other hand, the Child Sex Ratio for Jakhauli per the census is 802, which is lower than the Haryana average of 834. The literacy rate of Jakhauli village is 79.60% compared to 75.55% in Haryana. In Jakhauli, male literacy stands at 89%, while the female literacy rate is 69.9%.

Flocks of cattle egret, known as Bagula in Hindi, visit the village annually around June. These birds builds their nests mostly on Acacia karoo (kikar) tree, so that they can get sufficient sunlight for their eggs. They migrate from the village on start of winter season.

== Community ==
Jakhauli village has a significant presence of the Rajput community. Specifically those of Chauhan clan. Historically, the Chauhan’s have played an important role in the region, with a long-standing dominance and influence in the local administration and social structures.

=== History ===
The Chauhan of Jakhauli have been known for their military prowess and landholdings. Over the centuries, they have been a prominent community in the region. They belong to the Rajput community.

The Chauhans of Jakhauli have historically held a prominent position in the Sonipat region. They were known for their role as Zaildars, a title associated with local feudal lords who managed land and maintained law and order in the area. This community's influence extended over a large part of the region, particularly during the feudal era.

The Chauhans of Jakhauli also use the title "Rana" as their surname, a practice rooted in their historical association with the Jundla estate in Karnal, where they served as head villages under the feudal lordship system. This title signifies their noble lineage and their role as leaders within the broader Chauhan Rajput clan.

== Chauhan of Jakhauli ==
The Chauhans of Jakhauli were historically important figures in the Sonipat region as it is one of the most populous and biggest village(land ownership wise) of the Sonipat. They were known as Zaildar, a title associated with feudal lords who managed land and maintained order in the region.

=== Origins and the 36 Villages ===
The Chauhans of Jakhauli do not exist in isolation; they are a vital node in a much larger, historically significant network of 36 Chauhan Rajput villages scattered across the Sonipat district. The ancestry of this sprawling network is traced back to the city of Gohana, which acts as the foundational capital and regional epicenter for the clan. Historical records indicate Gohana was established by the Chauhan leader, Rana Tej Singh Chauhan.

This collective of 36 villages is strategically organized into two geographic clusters. A dense concentration of 12 villages surrounds the historical base of Gohana. The other 24 form an unbroken geographic corridor stretching from the Delhi border—anchored by the nearby town of Kundli, which is itself recognized as a major Rajput stronghold—all the way to Murthal, which caps the end of this belt. Jakhauli is woven directly into this specific regional corridor.

Throughout the Sonipat district, these Chauhan Rajputs predominantly use Rana as their surname, a custom proudly maintained in settlements spanning from Kundli till Murthal. This title is a direct nod to their Gohana roots, signifying their noble heritage and historical autonomy as headmen within the wider Chauhan lineage.

=== Zaildari System and Main Villages ===
While Jakhauli remains a crucial part of this agrarian fabric, the most dominant Chauhan villages in the immediate area are Murthal, Kundli, Nahri, Kumashpur, Khewra, Thana Khurd and many more. Unlike traditional panchayats, these primary villages historically managed the surrounding territories through the Zaildar system. Zaildars functioned as regional feudal authorities, tasked with overseeing vast agricultural estates, gathering revenue, and upholding local law and order.

The demographic and administrative weight of these nodal villages was cemented by their respective Zaildars:

- Murthal anchors the 24-village corridor and stands today as the most populous Rajput-dominated village in Sonipat, with a Chauhan population nearing 18,000. Its historical foundation and governance are credited to Zaildar Rana Malhan Singh Chauhan.
- Jakhauli operated as another massive regional power center and was historically commanded by the influential Zaildar Rana Harphul Singh.
