= Gubhana =

Indian Village

Coordinates: 28°36′N 76°51′E

Gubhana is a village in Badli Tehsil in Jhajjar District of Haryana State, India. Its Pin code is 124105 and postal head office is Bahadurgarh.

== Nearby villages ==
- Lukshar (3 km)
- Shah Pur (5 km)
- Badli (5 km)
- Kheri Jatt (6 km)
- Lagarpur (7 km)
- Majri(1km)
