= Khevra =

Khevra may refer to:

- Chevra, alternative spelling
- Khewra, Jhelum, a city in Pakistan
- Khewra, Sonipat, Haryana, India
