= 2025 New Delhi buckwheat flour food poisoning incident =

Mass foodborne illness in New Delhi in 2025

- Disease: Foodborne illness
- Location: Northwest Delhi, India
- First outbreak: Adarsh Nagar, Delhi
- Date: 23 September 2025
- Confirmed cases: Around 200 (some reports indicated higher totals)
- Suspected cases: 350+ (media reports)
- Hospitalized cases: 200 (official estimate)
- Deaths: 0

The 2025 New Delhi buckwheat flour food poisoning incident was a mass foodborne illness outbreak that occurred on 23 September 2025 in northwest Delhi, India, during the Hindu festival of Navratri. Hundreds of people fell ill after consuming food prepared with buckwheat flour (locally known as kuttu ka atta), a common fasting staple. Patients were treated at the Babu Jagjivan Ram Memorial Hospital in North Delhi. No fatalities were reported.

== Background ==
During Navratri, many devotees avoid grains such as wheat and rice and instead consume fasting foods prepared from alternatives such as buckwheat flour and water chestnut flour (singhara atta). The seasonal demand for these fasting staples increases significantly during the festival period, particularly in Delhi and other northern states of India.

== Incident ==
In the early morning of 23 September 2025, the Jahangirpuri police station received multiple reports of residents experiencing vomiting, stomach pain, dizziness, and diarrhea after consuming food made with buckwheat flour. Health officials linked the cases to food prepared during Navratri fasting.

The majority of cases were reported from neighbourhoods including Jahangirpuri, Mahendra Park, Samaypur, Bhalswa Dairy, Lal Bagh and Swaroop Nagar. Medical staff at Babu Jagjivan Ram Memorial Hospital confirmed that around 200 people had been treated in the emergency ward by midday; later reports from other outlets suggested higher totals. All patients were reported to be in stable condition and no deaths occurred.

== Government and health response ==
The Delhi Health Department and the Food Safety Department initiated an investigation, collecting samples of buckwheat flour from local markets and shops for laboratory testing. Police and health workers conducted community outreach using loudspeakers and door-to-door visits to warn residents against consuming suspect flour.

The Union Minister of Food Processing Industries announced that a thorough investigation would be undertaken and emphasized a zero-tolerance policy on food adulteration. The Food Safety and Standards Authority of India (FSSAI) and other relevant agencies were reported to be involved in testing and tracing the supply chain.

== Investigation ==
Authorities indicated that laboratory analyses of collected flour samples were pending in the days following the incident. Early enquiries suggested the contaminated flour may have been sourced from Adarsh Nagar market, but this had not been formally confirmed. Possible causes under review included adulteration, contamination during processing or transport, or improper storage conditions.

== Public reaction ==
The incident generated concern in affected neighbourhoods, especially as it coincided with Navratri fasting when consumption of buckwheat flour increases. Some shopkeepers temporarily suspended the sale of buckwheat flour while testing was underway. Neighbouring cities such as Noida and Ghaziabad increased inspections of fasting-related food items as a precautionary measure.

== See also ==
- Navratri
- Foodborne illness
- Public health in India
- List of foodborne illness outbreaks
