= Murthal gang rapes =

2016 crimes in Haryana, India

It was alleged by newspapers that on the night of 22–23 February 2016, "at least 10 women were pulled out from cars, stripped and raped by the goons" in Murthal, India. The event received large attention from both media and political parties with the Congress party demanding "President's rule in Haryana", and Delhi Chief Minister Arvind Kejriwal demanding "strict punishment for Haryana's Murthal gangrape culprits". A victim came forward after 6 days claiming that she was dragged from her car and raped in front of her daughter and accused her own brother-in-law of being one of the rapists. Two other alleged victims were also identified. On 20 January 2017, the Punjab and Haryana High Court said that witness statements, evidence show Murthal gang rapes took place.

It has been alleged that the victims of the rapes were escorted to the Delhi border by senior police officers half an hour after the incidents which explains no victims were able to be found during the investigation.
