= National Food Technology Institutes =

Group of food technology institutes in India

National Institutes of Food Technology, Entrepreneurship and Management
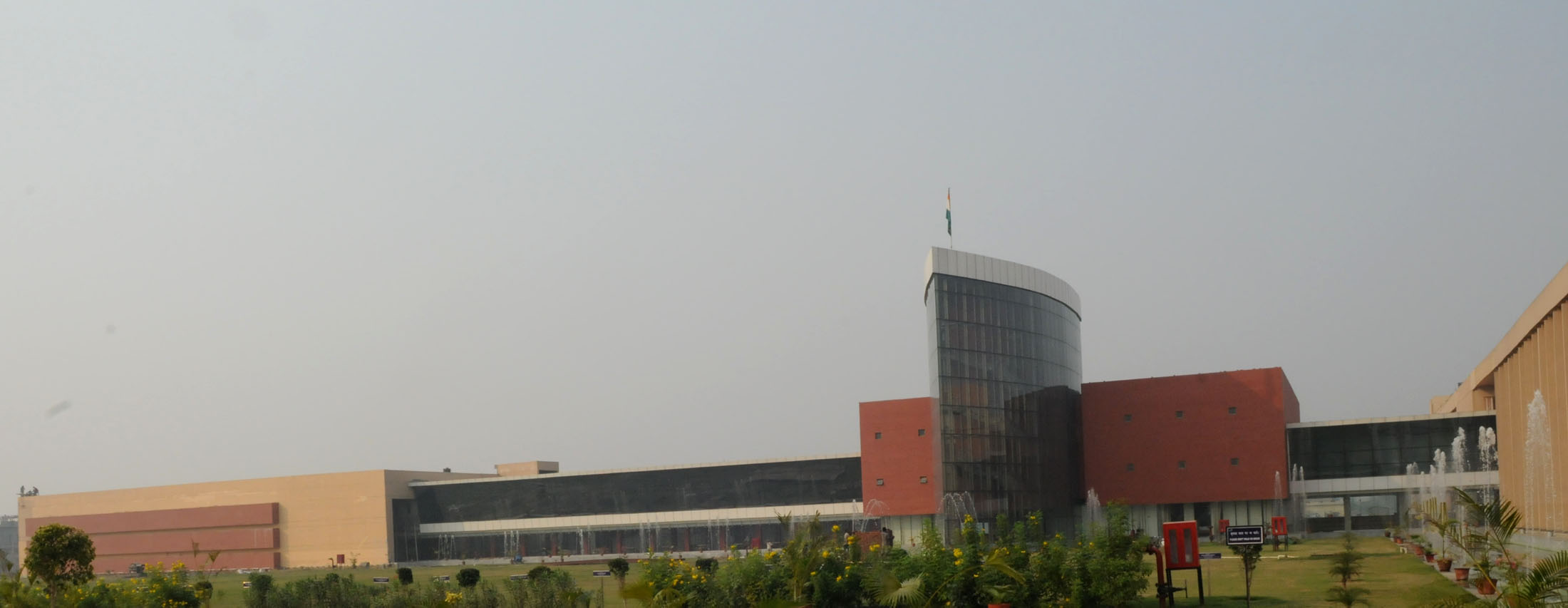
- Abbreviation: NIFTEM
- Type: Group of Institutes of National Importance
- Region served: India
- Members: 2 institutes
- Parent organization: Ministry of Food Processing Industries
- Affiliations: Government of India

The National Institutes of Food Technology, Entrepreneurship and Management (NIFTEMs) are centrally funded institutes in India specialising in food science, food technology, food processing, management and related subjects. They are administered by the Ministry of Food Processing Industries (MoFPI) and are designated as Institutes of National Importance under the National Institutes of Food Technology, Entrepreneurship and Management Act, 2021.

Two institutes operate under the NIFTEM framework: the National Institute of Food Technology Entrepreneurship and Management at Kundli, Haryana, known as NIFTEM-K, and the National Institute of Food Technology, Entrepreneurship and Management, Thanjavur in Thanjavur, Tamil Nadu, known as NIFTEM-T. The Thanjavur institute was previously known as the Indian Institute of Food Processing Technology (IIFPT).

The institutes conduct undergraduate, postgraduate and doctoral programmes and are also involved in research, food testing, incubation and training related to the food-processing industry.

== History ==
=== NIFTEM-Kundli ===
NIFTEM-K was established at Kundli in Haryana by the Ministry of Food Processing Industries as a specialised institution for education and research in food processing and related fields.

The project was criticised during its development for delays and cost increases. A parliamentary committee on agriculture reported that the estimated cost had risen from ₹245 crore to ₹480 crore. The institute had originally been expected to be completed during 2009–10, but completion was later projected for June 2014.

The committee also noted that the Department of Expenditure, the Planning Commission and the ministries responsible for health and human-resource development had raised objections to the project. Their concerns included possible duplication of functions, the cost of the institute, delays in implementation, uncertainty over the proposed courses and difficulty in recruiting faculty. At the time considered by the committee, 24 of 45 sanctioned faculty positions had been filled.

The committee questioned whether some of the proposed functions of NIFTEM could instead have been carried out by expanding the Institute of Crop Processing Technology at Thanjavur, which was already working in the same field.

=== Thanjavur institute ===
The Thanjavur institute developed separately from NIFTEM-K. It was earlier known as the Institute of Crop Processing Technology and later as the Indian Institute of Food Processing Technology. Under the 2021 legislation, it was brought under the NIFTEM framework and renamed the National Institute of Food Technology, Entrepreneurship and Management, Thanjavur.

Before the change in status, the institute offered undergraduate, postgraduate and doctoral programmes in food technology, food process engineering, food process technology, and food safety and quality assurance.

== Institute of National Importance status ==
The National Institutes of Food Technology, Entrepreneurship and Management Bill, 2019 was introduced in the Rajya Sabha on 13 February 2019. A standing committee submitted its report on the bill on 3 December 2019. The Rajya Sabha passed the bill on 16 March 2021 and the Lok Sabha passed it on 26 July 2021.

The resulting National Institutes of Food Technology, Entrepreneurship and Management Act, 2021 designated the institutes at Kundli and Thanjavur as Institutes of National Importance and created a common statutory framework for their administration and academic activities.

Under the Act, the institutes may provide instruction and conduct research in food science, food technology, entrepreneurship and management. They may hold examinations, award degrees and diplomas, establish academic and administrative posts and determine fees.

Each institute has a Board of Governors responsible for administration and a Senate responsible for academic matters. The Act also provides for a council to coordinate the activities of the institutes. Its membership includes representatives from the Ministry of Food Processing Industries, other Union government departments, the Food Safety and Standards Authority of India, NITI Aayog, academia and the food-processing industry.

The institutes maintain separate funds that may include central government grants, fees and other receipts. Their accounts are audited by the Comptroller and Auditor General of India.

== Academic programmes ==
NIFTEM-K has offered a B.Tech. programme in Food Technology Management and M.Tech. programmes in Food Process Engineering and Management, Food Technology and Management, Food Safety and Quality Management, Food Supply Chain Management, and Food Plant Operations and Management. Its doctoral programmes have covered food engineering, food science and technology, basic and applied sciences, agriculture and environmental sciences, and food business management and entrepreneurship development. The institute has also offered an MBA programme.

NIFTEM-T has offered a B.Tech. in Food Technology, M.Tech. programmes in Food Process Technology, Food Process Engineering, and Food Safety and Quality Assurance, and doctoral programmes in Food Process Technology and Food Process Engineering.

The sanctioned intake at both institutes has been increased over time. The Ministry of Food Processing Industries has stated that the increases were intended to meet demand for trained personnel in the food-processing sector.

== Research and incubation ==
Both institutes undertake research and provide facilities for food testing, product development and incubation.

In 2024, NIFTEM-K and NIFTEM-T were involved in a Ministry of Food Processing Industries programme for food-technology startups. The institutes provided participating startups with mentoring, training, access to pilot plants and food-testing facilities. According to Knowledge and News Network, 38 startups had received support under the programme, while six winners of a national startup challenge received ₹3 lakh each.

== Proposed institute in Bihar ==
In July 2022, Union food-processing minister Pashupati Kumar Paras proposed establishing another NIFTEM in Bihar. The Bihar government said it would support the proposal, and discussions were planned between the Union ministry and the state industries department.

The proposal was included in the Union Budget 2025–26. The budget announced that a National Institute of Food Technology, Entrepreneurship and Management would be established in Bihar. The government said the institute was intended to support food-processing activity in eastern India, increase value addition to agricultural produce and provide training and employment opportunities.

The proposal was also linked to the availability of food-testing facilities in Bihar. A February 2025 report said producers of makhana, litchi and honey sometimes relied on laboratories in other states for testing. The same report stated that testing could cost more than ₹5,000 per sample and take up to two months.

By April 2025, officials from the Ministry of Food Processing Industries and the Bihar Department of Industries were examining possible locations for the institute. Areas in northern Bihar and around Hajipur were among those considered.

At that stage, the Bihar institute remained under planning and site evaluation.

== See also ==
- Food science
- Ministry of Food Processing Industries
