= Deepak Sharma (soldier) =

Indian military officer

Captain Deepak Sharma KC
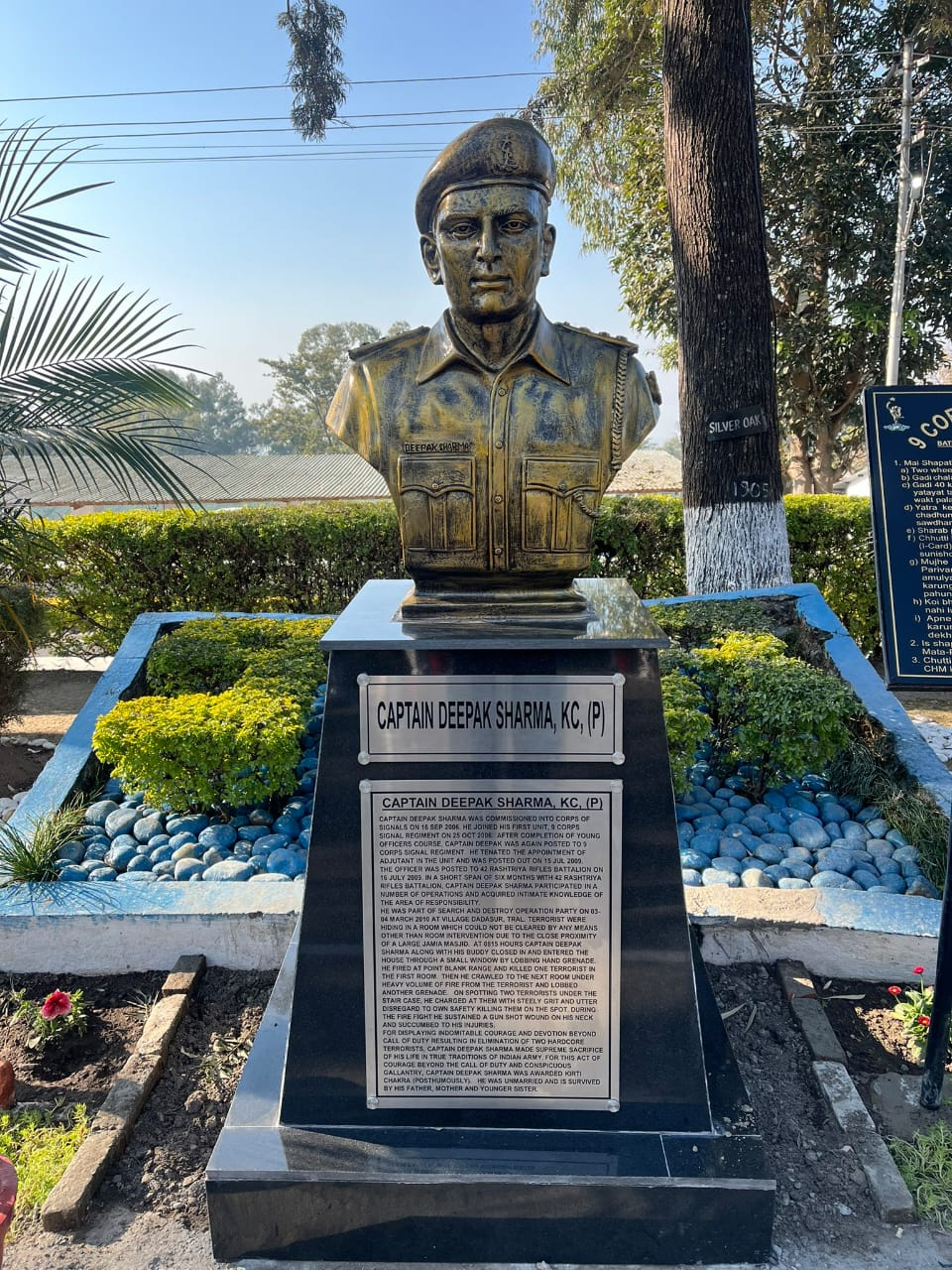
- Born: 3 July 1983; Rohtak, Haryana, India
- Died: 4 March 2010 (aged 26); Pulwama, Jammu and Kashmir, India
- Military career
- Branch: Indian Army
- Service years: 2006–2010
- Rank: Captain
- Service number: SS-42132
- Unit: 42 RR
- Awards: Kirti Chakra

Captain Deepak Sharma, KC (3 July 1983 – 4 March 2010) was an officer in the Indian Army's Corps of Signals, attached to the 42 Rashtriya Rifles (RR). He was posthumously awarded the Kirti Chakra, India's second-highest peacetime gallantry award, for his valor during a counter-insurgency operation in Pulwama district, Jammu and Kashmir.

== Early life and education ==
Born in Bidhlan village, Sonipat, Haryana, Captain Deepak Sharma was the son of Shri Naresh Kumar Sharma, a retired banker, and Smt Indu Sharma. He completed his senior secondary education at Shiksha Bharti School, Rohtak, and earned a Bachelor of Technology degree from Maharishi Dayanand University, Rohtak.

== Military career ==
Captain Sharma joined the Officer's Training Academy (OTA) in Chennai and was commissioned into the Corps of Signals on 16 September 2006. In March 2008, he was deputed to the 42 Rashtriya Rifles, a unit engaged in counter-insurgency operations in Jammu and Kashmir . During his service, Captain Sharma was recognized for his dedication and leadership. In January 2010, he got engaged to a fellow officer from the Signal Regiment, with plans to marry in June of the same year .

== Pulwama operation and Martyrdom ==
On 4 March 2010, acting on intelligence about militants hiding in Dadsara village, Pulwama, Captain Sharma led an operation to neutralize the threat. The target house was adjacent to a mosque, necessitating a precise assault to avoid collateral damage. Demonstrating exceptional bravery, Captain Sharma entered the house through a window after tossing grenades. He engaged and killed one terrorist in the first room. Despite heavy gunfire, he proceeded to the next room, where he eliminated two more militants hiding under a staircase.

During the intense firefight, he sustained a gunshot wound to the neck and later succumbed to his injuries.

== See also ==
- Kirti Chakra
- Rashtriya Rifles
- Major Mohit Sharma
