= Pritam Pal =

Indian judge

Lokayukta
- In office 18, January 2011 – 18, January 2016

President, State Consumer Commission, Chandigarh
- In office 2009 – 17, January 2011

High Court Judge
- In office 5, November 2004 – 2, June 2009

Registrar General in Punjab and Haryana High Court, Chandigarh
- In office 28, January 2002 – 4, November 2004

Haryana Superior Judiciary
- In office March 1986 – January 2002

Personal details
- Born: 3 June 1947 (age 79) Kandroli village, district, Haryana, British India
- Spouse: Maya Devi
- Children: Sons: Ajay Pal Pritam and Aman Pal Daughters: Dr. Parveen, Sukhda Pritam and Vandana
- Education: Kurukshetra University, Kurukshetra
- Occupation: Judge

Justice Pritam Pal was born on 3 June 1947. After putting 14 years of practice in law, he joined Haryana Superior Judicial Service and remained District and Sessions Judge of various districts. In the year 2002, he was posted as Registrar General and then elevated as permanent Judge of the Punjab and Haryana High Court. On his superannuation, he was appointed as President, State Consumer Redressal Commission, UT, Chandigarh. Thereafter, he was appointed Lokayukta, Haryana.

He recommended action in many high-profile matters involving Ministers, MLAs, builders, promoters and senior officers for committing acts of corruption. In his reports to the Governor, for eradication of corruption, he recommended and suggested introducing compulsory moral education at the school level. He also headed the Monitoring Committee of the National Green Tribunal constituted for the States of Punjab, Haryana, Himachal Pradesh and UT, Chandigarh. Presently, he is Vice-President of DAV College Managing Committee, New Delhi.

He is running Aarshvidya Gurukul at Yagya Shala situated on Ladwa-Indri Road, Kurukshetra, with the main objective of imparting value and character-based education for poor children, affiliated with Haryana Shiksha Board. He has been regularly holding character-building camps for the last ten years along with other social activities, including organizing free medical camps, blood donation camps and mass marriages of poor girls.

He has written three books: Power of Thought in English, Vichar Shakti Ka Chamatkar in Hindi, and Mukti Prapti Ki Vidhi in Sanskrit. Presently, he has undertaken to create awareness about environmental protection and social justice in the State of Haryana. He firmly believes that air, water and land are the three main components of nature, which have been described in our scriptures, i.e., in Vedas and Gurubani: water as father (Pita), air as guru (Teacher), and land as mother (Mata). His slogan “Development is must but environment and health is first” epitomizes the values by which we all should live.

== Education ==
- Graduated from Punjab University, Chandigarh in 1969.
- Completed LL.B. in July, 1972 from Kurukshetra University, Kurukshetra.

== Law career ==
Pritam Pal practiced as a lawyer for 14 years at District Courts of Karnal and Kurukshetra. This period of legal practice was mainly devoted to the social service, Arya Samaj, and for improving the educational facilities in the area.

== Judge in Haryana Superior Judicial Service ==
In March 1986 he was selected as a member to the Judiciary. Later he joined as Additional District and Sessions Judge.

=== Postings as District and Sessions Judge ===
Districts Gurgaon, Rohtak, Ambala, Yamuna Nagar, Hisar, Mohindergarh at Narnaul, Bhiwani and Faridabad. January 2002 to November 2004: Registrar General of the Punjab and Haryana High Court.

== High Court Judge ==
November 2004: Elevated as Permanent Judge to Punjab and Haryana High Court, Chandigarh. During tenure he presided over approximately 6900 cases. June 2009: Retired after attaining age of superannuation.

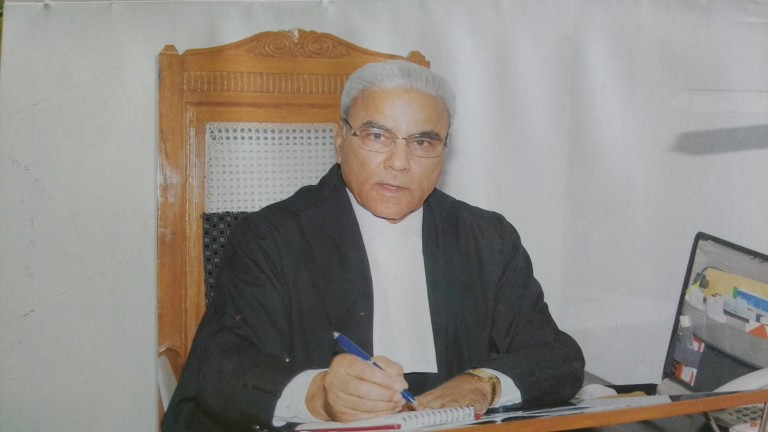
Justice Pritam Pal sitting in his chamber in Punjab and Haryana High Court

== President, State Consumer Disputes Redressal Commission, Chandigarh ==
Appointed and worked as such till 17 January 2011.

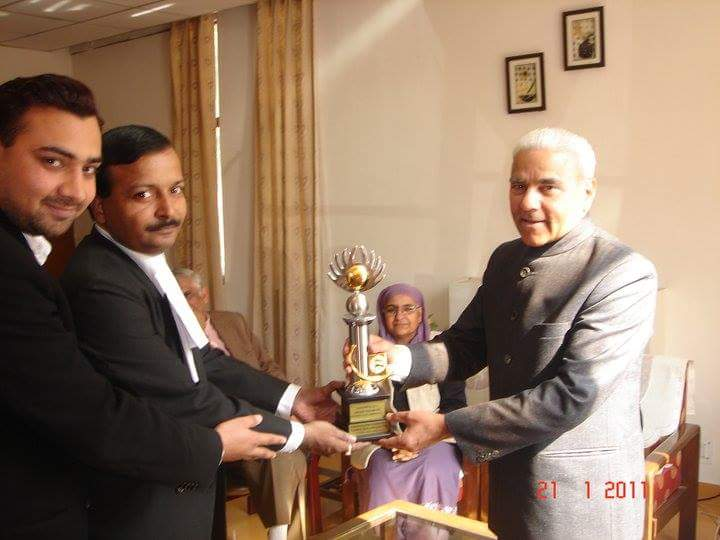
Justice Pritam Pal accepting wishes of Bar on his last day as President of SCDRC, Chandigarh

== Lokayukta Haryana (INDIA) ==
- He was appointed to the post of Lokayukta (Ombudsman) Haryana and was administered oath on 18 January 2011 and retired as such from the post on 18 January 2016.

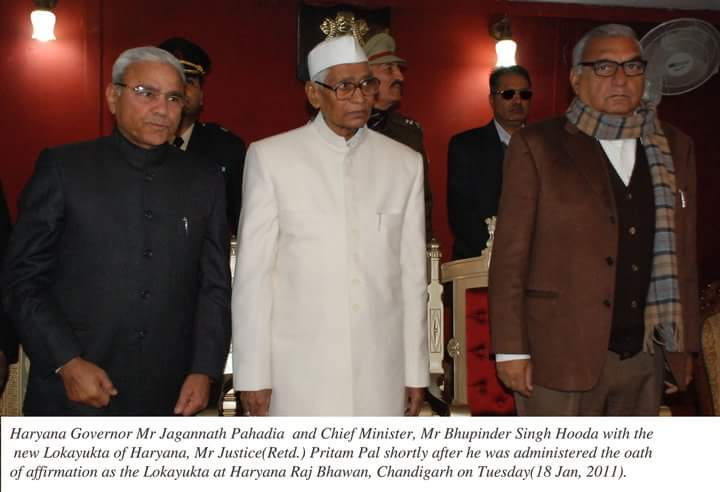
Justice Pritam Pal after taking oath as Lokayukta, Haryana

- He has submitted annual reports over national and regional institutions and their workings and has given various recommendations to improve their efficiency and also submitted reports for eradication of corruption in the State. He made headlines in 2014 when he recommended various measures to improve the institutions. The Government of Haryana has acted on those and has instituted a committee to further investigate the conclusions of his report and recommend necessary improvements. He is a frequent visitor of local communities and holds Lokayukta Court at various places in Haryana so that people do not need to visit Chandigarh where the office of Lokayukta is located. He has made enormous efforts to sensitize the institution of Lokayukta in Haryana. In an interview he showed his helplessness to take adequate action against the officials, that corrupt the system due to his limited powers. He has recently recommended an investigation into land scam affair in Panipat. Authorities however have been reluctant at times to comply with the orders passed. Government has sought explanation from senior bureaucrats in MNRGEGS Scam on his recommendation recently. He has recently directed Chief Secretary Haryana to file a detailed action report regarding action taken against four I.A.S. Officers and one H.C.S. Officer for MNREGS Scam in Ambala District of Haryana

=== Major cases handled ===
- Recommended registration of FIR against Ram Kishan Fauji, the then CPS on allegations of corruption in cash for CLU scam of Haryana wherein two young men were seen doing stings of various MLAs of Haryana.
- Recommended an investigation into five more sitting MLAs of Haryana, in the Cash for CLU Scam.
- Constituted a high power Special Investigation Team, which unearthed tax evasion of around Rs. 11000 Crores which is one of the biggest scams of Haryana. He is likely to recommend criminal action against guilty in the scam.
- MNRGES Scam in Ambala District of Haryana
- Has presided over nearly 1800 cases to date, despite having a shortage of staff.
- Recently alleged reality fraud done by former Sohna MLA has come into his scanner

== Social Justice Front ==
Justice Pritam Pal has launched a non-political, but social outfit under the name of “Social Justice front”. Aim of this front would be to fight prevailing corruption, injustice with any individual or any section of society, drug abuse, female foeticide, character building, promote education, and work against various other prevailing social evils weakening the social set up.

Membership for this organisation has been launched.

== Languages ==
He is fluent in English, Hindi, Sanskrit, Urdu, and Punjabi.

== Writer ==
Pritam Pal has written three books in three different languages. Firstly "Power of Thought" in English and "Vichar Shakti ka Chamatkar" in Hindi. He has written another book "Mukti Prapti ki Vidhi" in Sanskrit.

== Religious person and social worker ==
He is a strict disciple of Arya Samaj, He is running Aarshvidya Gurukul at Yagya shala situated on Ladwa-Indri road, Kurukshetra, with the main objective of imparting value and character based education for poor children, affiliated with Haryana Shiksha Board. He is regularly holding character building camps for the last ten years along with other social activities including organizing free medical camps, blood donation camps and mass marriages of poor girls. He has written three books; ‘’Power of Thought” in English, “Vichar Shakti Ka Chamatkar’’ in Hindi and ‘’Mukti Prapti Ki Vidhi” in Sanskrit. He was in the news when he donated antique articles to the Kurukshetra University which are now kept in a cultural museum.

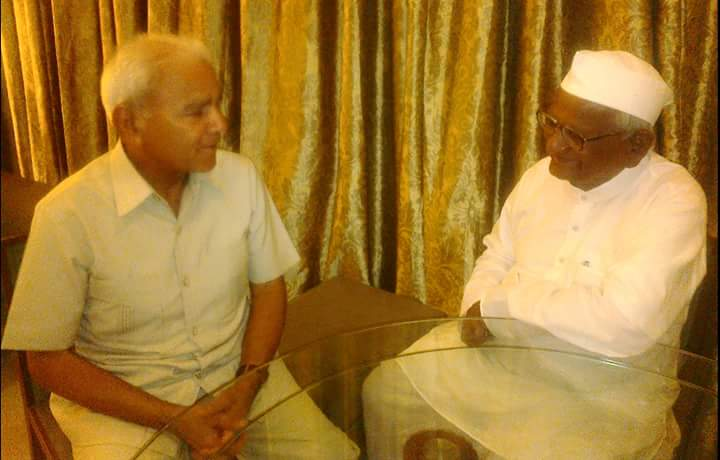
Justice Pritam Pal with Sh. Anna Hazare

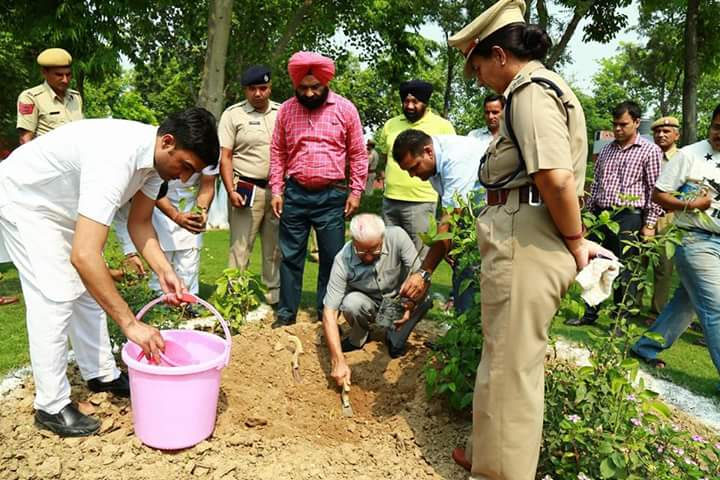
Justice Pritam Pal in Kurukshetra Jail

Presently, he has undertaken to create an awareness qua the issues of environment protection and social justice in the State of Haryana. He firmly believes that air, water and land are three main components of the ‘Nature’ which have been described in our scriptures i.e in Vedas and Gurubani, water as father ‘Pita’, air as guru ‘Teacher’ and land as mother ‘Mata’. His slogan “Development is must but environment and health is first” epitomize the values by which we all should live.

== Ideology ==
For him value of life is the greatest asset of mankind. He lays much emphasis on the character of a person which according to him is the reason and source for our happiness and sorrow. He gives regular speeches to visitors to his Yagyashala and also at the places he visits. His major quotes are shared below:

- God's biggest gift to us is our human body. It is like a boat, which takes us across the ocean of Sansara (world). You must think that God has chosen you to perform good deeds.
- Always remember, "Everything is within you". Wherever you go, you take with yourself either a happy or a dull heart, and accordingly you will create either a heaven or hell for yourself.
