= National Institute of Food Technology Entrepreneurship and Management =

Higher education institute in Haryana, India

National Institute of Food Technology Entrepreneurship and Management, Kundli
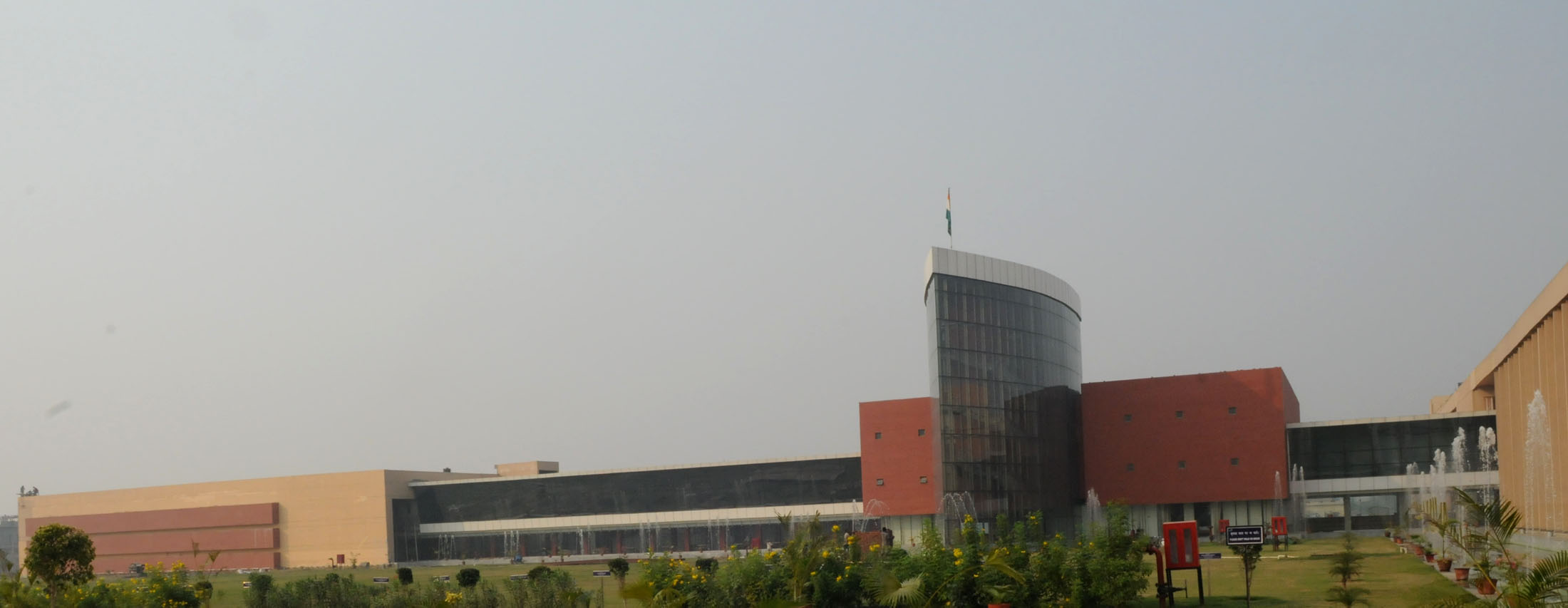
- Motto in English: Knowledge • Innovation • Outreach
- Type: Institute of National Importance
- Established: 2012
- Affiliations: MOFPI, UGC
- Budget: ₹74.07 crore (US$7.7 million) (2025–26)
- Chairperson: Dr. V. Ramgopal Rao
- Director: Harinder Singh Oberoi
- Students: 911
- Undergraduates: 607
- Postgraduates: 224
- Doctoral students: 80
- Location: Kundli, Sonipat, Haryana, India; 28°52′45″N 76°07′59″E
- Language: Haryanvi, Hindi, English
- Website: www.niftem.ac.in

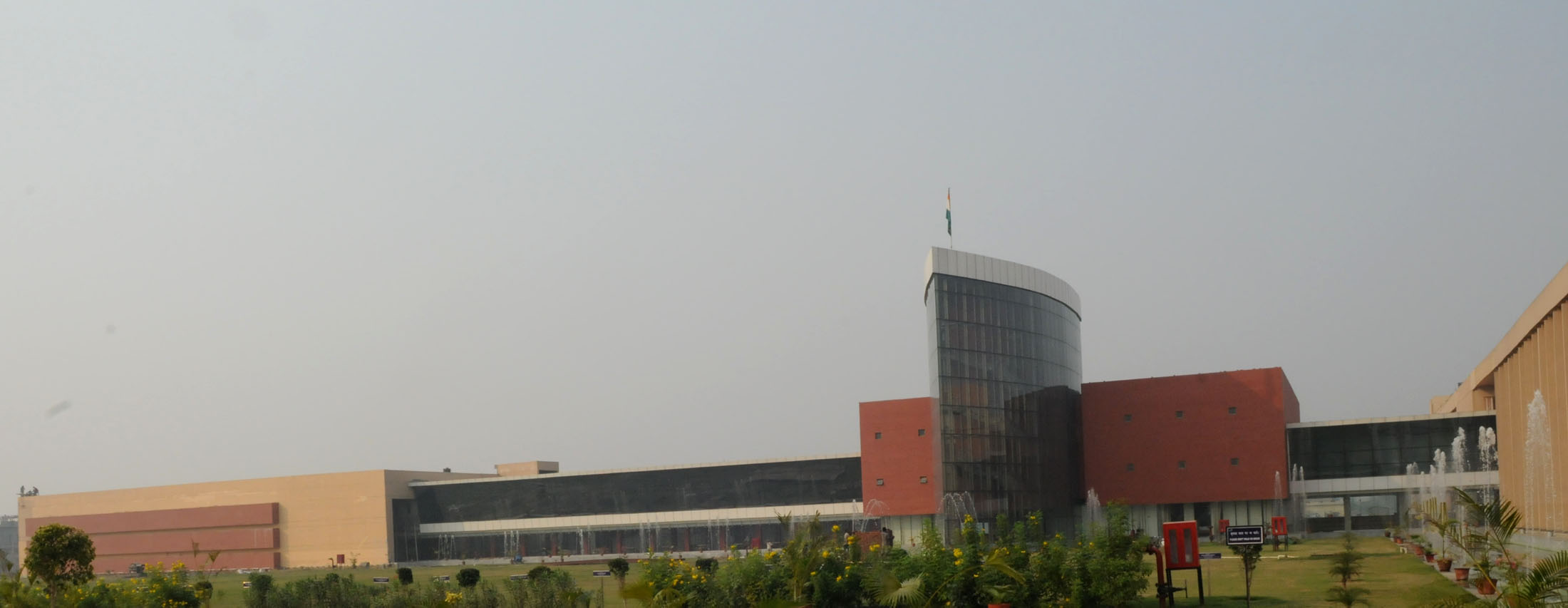
Main block of National Institute of Food Technology Entrepreneurship and Management - Kundli, Sonipat, Haryana, India

National Institute of Food Technology Entrepreneurship and Management (NIFTEM-K) is a higher education institute operating under the Ministry of Food Processing Industries (MOFPI). It is located at Kundli industrial area of Sonipat, Haryana, India. It was granted the Institute of National Importance status in 2021. It is one of the National Food Technology Institutes created to promote better food science education and technology development in the country.

== History ==
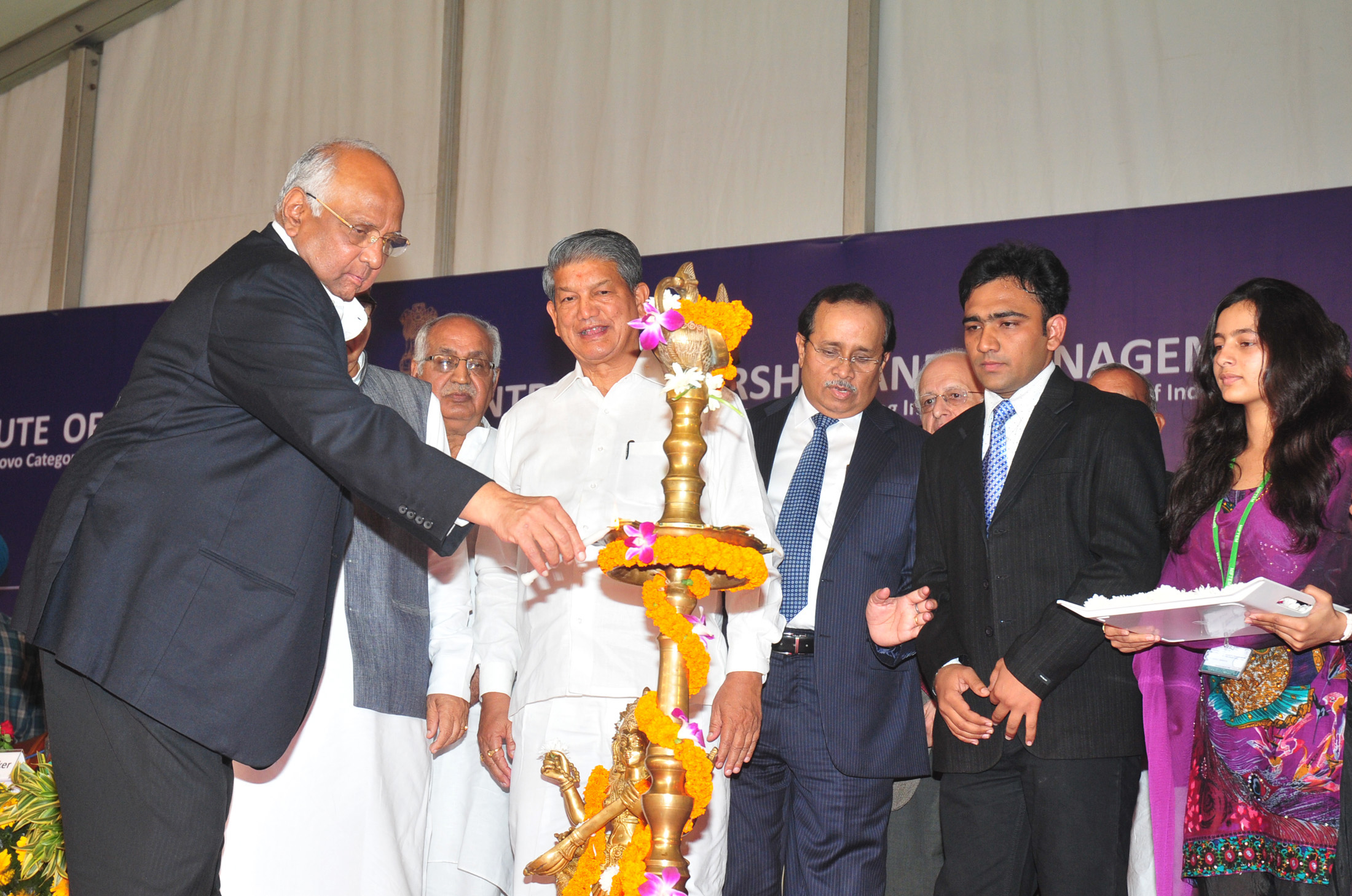
Agriculture and Food Processing Industries, Sharad Pawar, the India Minister of Agriculture and Food Distribution, inaugurating NIFTEM-K in 2012

NIFTEM-K was first officially announced in the budget speech for 2006–07 made by P. Chidambaram, the Minister of Finance, in February 2006. But the institute was only to be inaugurated in 2012, by Sharad Pawar, the Minister of Agriculture and Consumer Affairs, Food and Public Distribution. It was set with an original investment of ₹500 crore (equivalent to ₹943 crore or US$98 million in 2023), on 100 acres (40 ha) of land.

The institute started with several Bachelor of Technology (B.Tech.) programmes. Master of Technology (M.Tech.) programmes have been offered since the academic year 2012–13, and a Ph.D programme was added from 2013 to 2014. The first convocation of the institute, held in February 2018, was attended by the President of India, Ram Nath Kovind.

In 2018, the Minister of Food Processing Industries Harsimrat Kaur Badal inaugurated four incubation centres for product testing and development and a food-testing laboratory, with an investment of ₹50 crore (US$5.2 million).

In February 2019, the National Institutes of Food Technology Entrepreneurship and Management Bill, 2019 was introduced in the Rajya Sabha. The bill aimed at granting Institute of National Importance (INI) status to two NIFTEM - Kundli and NIFTEM - Thanjavur (formerly Indian Institute of Food Processing Technology (IIFPT)) , thus granting them more financial and academic autonomy. The bill was passed by the Rajya Sabha on 15 March 2021 and by the Lok Sabha on 26 July 2021.

== Academics ==
NIFTEM-K offers a 4-year Bachelor of Technology (B.Tech.) curriculum, 2-year Master of Technology (M.Tech.) curriculum, and Ph.D degrees in the various areas of food technology and supply. It also offers a Master of Business Administration (MBA) course, focusing on food and agribusiness management. Admission to B.Tech. is based on Joint Entrance Examination – Main (JEE (Mains). Admission to M.Tech. is based on Graduate Aptitude Test in Engineering (GATE) and a personal interview.

=== Undergraduate Programs ===
- Bachelor of Technology (B.Tech.)
  - Course Details: A 4-year undergraduate curriculum. Admission to this program is based on the Joint Entrance Examination – Main (JEE Mains).
  - Field/Specialization: Food Technology and Management (FTM). The curriculum blends technical engineering skills with business acumen to produce industry-ready techno-managers.
- Bachelor of Business Administration (BBA Hons)
  - Course Details: A 4-year undergraduate honours degree.
  - Field/Specialization: Data and Business Analytics. This program focuses on developing analytical and data-driven management skills specifically tailored for the food and agribusiness sectors.

=== Postgraduate Programs ===
- Master of Technology (M.Tech.)
  - Course Details: A 2-year postgraduate curriculum. Admission is determined by Graduate Aptitude Test in Engineering (GATE) scores and a personal interview.
  - Field/Specialization: NIFTEM-K offers five distinct specializations at the master's level:
    - Food Technology and Management (FTM)
    - Food Plant Operations Management (FPOM)
    - Food Safety and Quality Management (FSQM)
    - Food Supply Chain Management (FSCM)
    - Food Process Engineering and Management (FPEM)
- Master of Science (M.Sc.)
  - Course Details: A 2-year postgraduate science degree.
  - Field/Specialization: Food Science and Technology. It places a heavy emphasis on food safety, laboratory analysis, product innovation, and scientific research.
- Master of Business Administration (MBA)
  - Course Details: A 2-year full-time postgraduate management program.
  - Field/Specialization: The core compulsory focus is Food and Agribusiness Management. Students also select an optional secondary specialization from Marketing, Finance, or International Business.
- Executive Master of Business Administration (EMBA)
  - Course Details: A postgraduate management degree designed for working professionals.
  - Field/Specialization: Advanced strategic management and leadership training tailored for experienced professionals in the food processing and allied industries.

=== Integrated & Doctoral Programs ===
- Integrated B.Tech + MBA
  - Course Details: A 5-year integrated dual-degree program.
  - Field/Specialization: This program combines a B.Tech in Food Technology (FT) with an MBA in Food and Agribusiness Management, allowing students to earn both technical and managerial degrees consecutively.
- Doctor of Philosophy (Ph.D.)
  - Course Details: The highest academic degree focused on advanced research in various areas of food technology and supply.
  - Field/Specialization: Research areas align with the institute's five core academic departments:
    - Food Science and Technology (FST)
    - Food Engineering (FE)
    - Agriculture and Environmental Science (AES)
    - Interdisciplinary Sciences (IDS)
    - Food Business Management and Entrepreneurship Development (FBM&ED)

Academics departments

The academic programmes of NIFTEM-K comes under five following departments:

- Food Science and Technology (FST)
- Food Engineering (FE)
- Agriculture and Environmental Science (AES)
- Interdisciplinary sciences (IDS)
- Food Business Management and Entrepreneurship Development (FBM&ED)

=== Rankings ===
University rankings

Engineering – India
- NIRF (2024): 127

NIFTEM-K was ranked 127 by National Institutional Ranking Framework (NIRF) in the 2022 engineering ranking.

== Research ==
In May 2018 NIFTEM-K opened four incubation centres which serve as research facilities for entrepreneurs and other businesses seeking to develop and test new products and processes.

NIFTEM-K also conducts research in nutrition. In 2019 it conducted research on improving the taste and nutritional value of Amrutham Nutrimix, a dietary supplement which the Kerala government distributes in large volume for children below the age of three. Later that year it signed a memorandum of understanding (MoU) for launching the Kerala Nutrition Research Centre, a nutrition research centre focused on the nutrition of women and children.

== See also ==
- List of institutions of higher education in Haryana
- Institutes of National Importance
