= National Institute of Food Technology, Entrepreneurship and Management, Thanjavur =

Higher education institute in Tamil Nadu, India

National Institute of Food Technology, Entrepreneurship and Management - Thanjavur (NIFTEM-T)
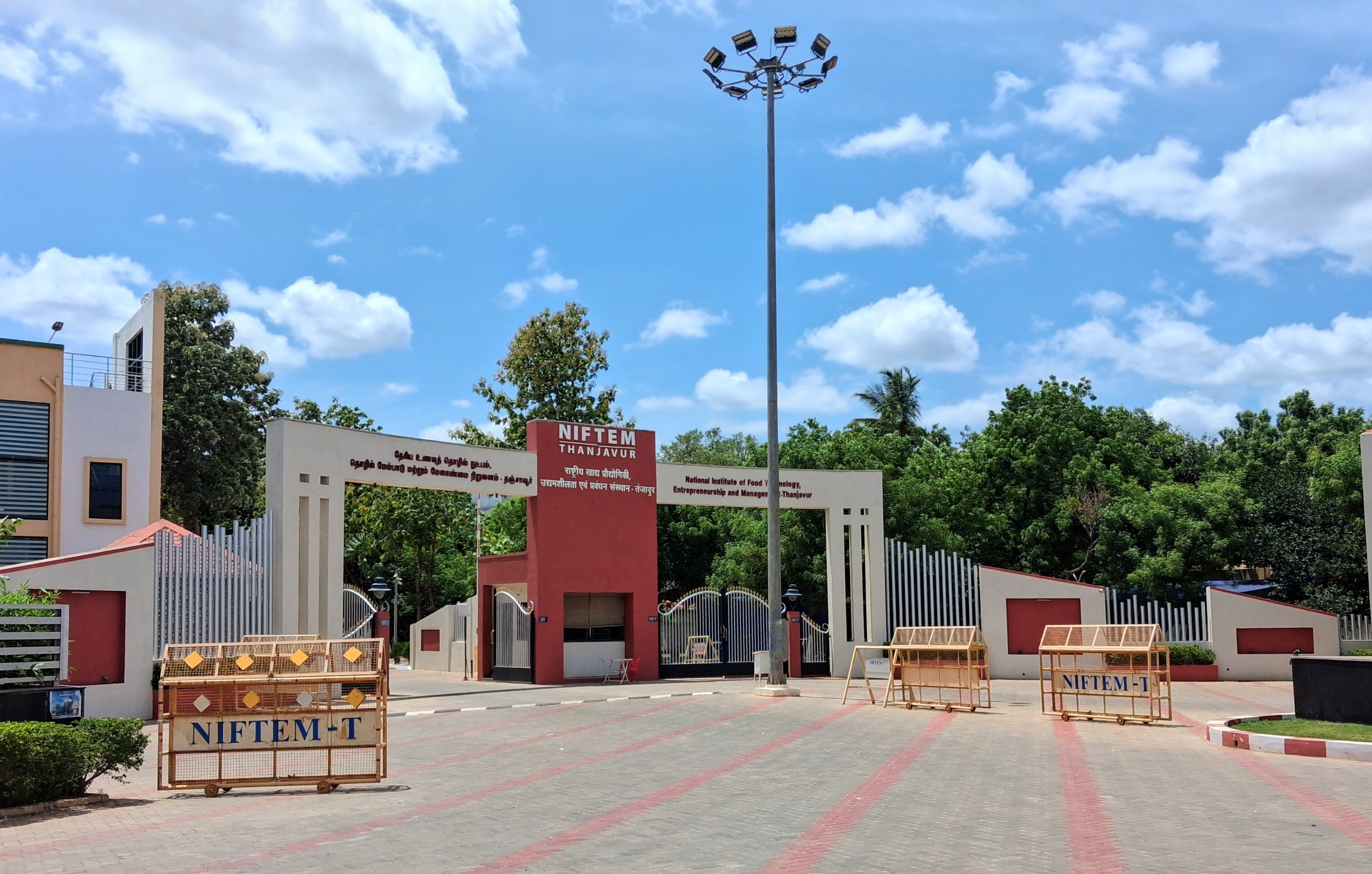
- Former name: Indian Institute of Food Processing Technology
- Type: Institute of National Importance
- Established: 1967; 59 years ago
- Founder: Dr. V. Subrahmanyan
- Budget: ₹98.88 crore (US$10 million) (2025–26)
- Chairperson: Dr. R. S. Sodhi
- Director: Dr. V. Palanimuthu
- Faculty: 40
- Students: 291
- Undergraduates: 213
- Postgraduates: 78
- Doctoral students: 44
- Location: Thanjavur, Tamil Nadu, India; 26.8622°N 75.8156°E
- Website: niftem-t.ac.in

National Institute of Food Technology, Entrepreneurship and Management, Thanjavur (NIFTEM-T) or National Institute of Technology, Thanjavur NITTNV(Specialization in Food Technology, Entrepreneurship & Management) formerly Indian Institute of Food Processing Technology (IIFPT), is an academic institution with Institute of National Importance (INI) status, functioning under the Ministry of Food Processing Industries (MoFPI), Government of India located at Thanjavur, Tamil Nadu. The institute offers academic and research programmes in the field of food processing technology. The institute has National Accreditation Board for Testing and Calibration Laboratories (NABL) accredited food quality testing laboratory which is also notified Food Safety and Standards Authority of India (FSSAI) Referral Food Laboratory. It is one of the National Food Technology Institutes created to promote better food science education and technology development in the country. Food product development laboratory, food microbiology laboratory, post harvest pest management laboratory, food processing incubation center, Central Instrumentation Laboratory and food engineering laboratories are in its main campus at Thanjavur. NIFTEM-T is operating liaison offices at Guwahati, Assam and Bathinda, Punjab. These liaison offices have facilities to give skill development trainings, incubation and consultancy services to the farmers, entrepreneurs and students in the field of value addition of agricultural produce and food processing technologies.

== History ==
Dr. V. Subrahmanyan an eminent scientist and former director of CSIR - Central Food Technological Research Institute, Mysore, started Paddy Processing Research Centre (PPRC) in 1967 with the aim of providing solutions to farmers in the preservation of high moisture paddy. Considering the need of R & D efforts in the post-harvest processing, preservation and value addition of raw agricultural produce, the Ministry of Food Processing Industries (MoFPI) upgraded the PPRC and renamed it as Indian Institute of Crop Processing Technology (IICPT) in February 2008. Apart from R&D activities, IICPT started offering academic and research programmes in the field of food processing technology from the year 2009. Since the scope of the institute widened from post-harvest processing to value addition of agricultural produce, it was renamed as Indian Institute of Food Processing Technology in March 2017. The institute is located at Thanjavur, the ancient capital of Chola Dynasty. IIFPT has well equipped laboratories and engaged in the R&D of post- harvest technologies, food processing, value addition, by-product utilization, processes and products development.

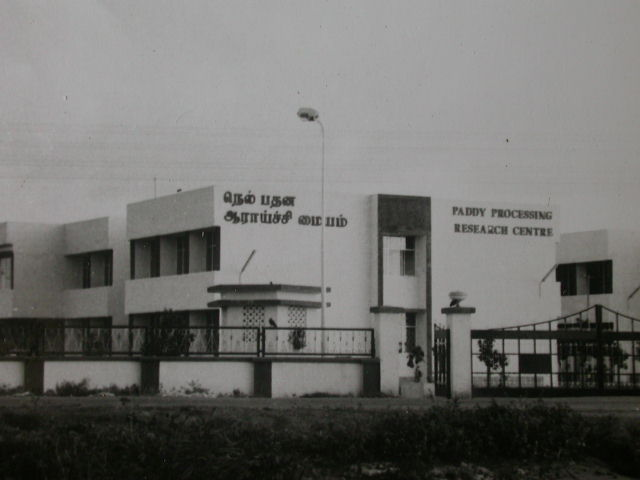
Paddy Processing Research Center

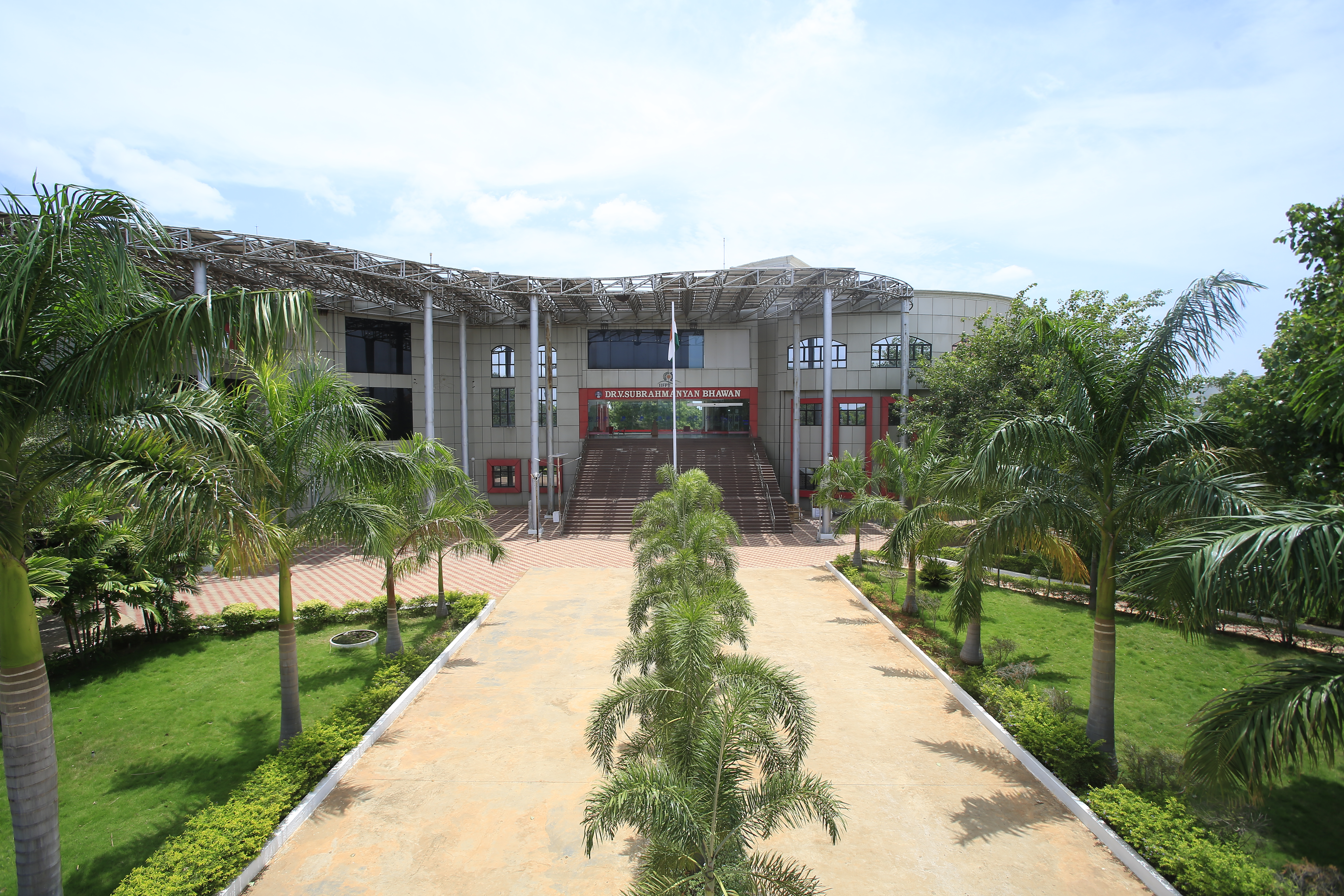
National Institute of Food Technology, Entrepreneurship and Management, Thanjavur

In February 2019, the National Institutes of Food Technology Entrepreneurship and Management Bill, 2019 was introduced in the Rajya Sabha. The bill aimed at granting Institute of National Importance (INI) status to IIFPT, Thanjavur, Tamil Nadu and National Institute of Food Technology Entrepreneurship and Management (NIFTEM) Sonipat, Haryana , which are the part of National Institutes of Technology , thus granting them more financial and academic autonomy. The bill was passed by the Rajya Sabha on 15 March 2021 and by the Lok Sabha on 26 July 2021, The National Institutes of Food Technology, Entrepreneurship and Management Act, 2021 was published in the Gazette of India on 30 July 2021 and the name of IIFPT has been changed to National Institute of Food Technology, Entrepreneurship and Management-Thanjavur (NIFTEM-T).

== Academics ==
NIFTEM-T offers undergraduate, postgraduate and doctorate degrees in food technology and allied fields.

=== Admissions ===
Admission to the undergraduate B.Tech programme is done through Joint Seat Allocation Authority using the rank secured in JEE-Main examination. Admission to postgraduate and doctoral programme is done based on the performance of the candidates in their undergraduate studies and the entrance examination conducted by the institute.

=== Departments ===
NIFTEM-T has following departments for academic and research activities

- Food Process Engineering
- Food Process Technology
- Food Safety and Quality Assurance
- Food Business Management
- Food Plant Operations, Incubation and Entrepreneurship
- Food Packaging and Storage Technology

== Research and Industrial Consultancy ==
=== Research ===
NIFTEM-T is engaged in R&D activities in food processing and its allied sectors. Faculty members with their team of students, scholars, Research Associates, Senior/Junior Research Fellows and Project Assistants undertake research and industrial consultancy assignments. Ministry of Food Processing Industries, Science and Engineering Research Board, Department of Science and Technology, Coconut Development Board, Ministry of Small and Medium Enterprises are the major agencies provide funding for the research activities undertaken by IIFPT. 3D Food printing technology, Sensor development for quality testing of foods, post-harvest processing of small onions, food industry waste and by product utilization, Shelf life enhancements of different food products, functional foods, non-thermal processing of foods, food engineering, food processing equipment design, development of packaging materials and systems, sensory evaluation of foods are some of the niche areas of its research activities.

Non-dairy millet ice cream, Mobile Food processing unit, integrated onion processing unit, glycemic index and food degradation kinetics studies of foods, are the major technologies developed and commercialized by IIFPT.

=== Industrial Consultancy ===
NIFTEM-T is also providing consultancy and R&D services to various food processing industries for new product development, refinement of existing processes & products and food quality testing services.

=== Collaborations ===
Memorandum of Understanding (MoUs) have been signed with International and National academic institutions, research organizations and industries to carry out R&D activities. This platform creates avenues for joint research activities, capacity building programs, student and faculty exchange programs.

== Students activities ==
NIFTEM-T students organizes inter collegiate cultural fest named "iFESTY". Students from all over the country participate in this event to exhibit their talents. Demonstrations on Yoga and lectures on yogic practices are conducted during International Yoga Day. Annual sports events are organized by the students to exhibit their talents in sports and games. The institute has indoor and outdoor sports facilities.

== Incubation Center ==
As of 2021, a food processing business incubation center is functioning in its main campus at Thanjavur, and also in its liaison offices at Guwahati and Bathinda. The center provides incubation services to entrepreneurs, who are interested in setting up their businesses in the area of food processing. It also conducts short and long term training programs on various food processing technologies. The facilities including the equipment and machinery are given on rental basis to stake holders who wish to produce and market test their products before venturing in the food processing businesses.

For its entrepreneurship and employment initiatives, NIFTEM-T received AICTE - Saansad Aadarsh Gram Yojana (SAGY) awards 2018 on the theme "Developed Village - Developed Nation'

NIFTEM-T is a nodal agency for the Prime Minister - Formalization of Micro Enterprises (PM FME) Scheme, a major initiative of Ministry of Food Processing Industries (MoFPI), Government of India under Atmanirbhar Bharat to provide technical, financial and business support to the existing and new micro level food processing industries. The scheme aims to enhance competitiveness of existing micro enterprises in the unorganized segment of the food processing industry and support Farmer Producer organizations, Self-Help Groups (SHGs) and other Cooperatives. For this scheme, IIFPT is serving in capacity building to support micro enterprises, branding and marketing, strengthening of institutions and project management framework. NIFTEM-T has coordinated with various national level technical institutes and compiled indicative cost norms guidelines hand book for establishment of common incubation facility under PM FME scheme. IIFPT has prepared the training syllabus for the different levels of PM FME training programs as Training of Master Trainers (ToMT), Training of Trainers (ToT) at District level and Training of Beneficiaries (ToB) to impart skills on various aspects of food processing.

== Rankings ==
University rankings

Engineering – India
- NIRF (2022): 86

NIFTEM-T ranked 86th among engineering institutions by the National Institutional Ranking Framework (NIRF) in 2022.

Atal Ranking of Institutions on Innovation Achievements (ARIIA) 2021 ranked NIFTEM-T as Excellent Band in the Institute of National Importance & Central Universities/CFTIs (Technical) Category, a major initiative by MoE, Innovation cell (MIC), Ministry of Education.

NIFTEM-T was one among the six institutes honored with Utkrisht Sansthan Vishwakarma Awards 2019 by AICTE southern region for its best practices and contribution to enhance the income of villages through food processing.
