= Badli =

Village in Delhi, India

Coordinates: 28°35′N 76°49′E

Badli is a Village located in Rohini, North West District of Union Territory of Delhi, India. Three Metro Station are Nearly is Rohini Sector 18, 19 Metro Station, Haiderpur Badli Mor Metro Station and Samaypur Badli Metro Station.

== Geography ==
Badli is a village in the North West Delhi district of Delhi, India. It is located 9 kilometres to the east of Kanjhawala, the district headquarters.

== Demographics ==
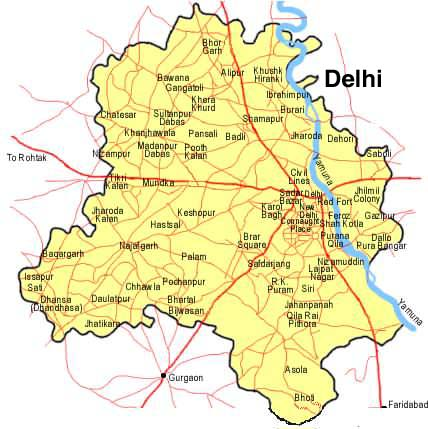
Map of Delhi showing location of Badli

Badli is now an urban village, having lost its most of the land through the Government acquisition for the development of Rohini. It has a railway and metro rail station.

Badli now is an assembly constituency being represented by the two times councilor and present MLA sh. Ahir Deepak Choudhary. The constituency consists of two urban villages namely Badli and Samaypur, while also including three rural villages: Libaspur, Siraspur, and Bhalswa.

It has two resettlement colonies: Bhalswa & Jahangirpuri. It also has around 32 unauthorised colonies.

== Administration ==
Member of the Legislative Assembly from Badli is Gajendra Yadav of Bharatiya Janata Party, who won in 2025 Delhi Legislative Assembly election for the first time. In 2015 Yadav defeated then incumbent Devender Yadav of INC.

== Badli Industrial Area ==
Badli Industrial Area is one of the important Industrial areas of Amritsar Delhi Kolkata Industrial Corridor, of North Delhi Badli village is an urban village of North West Delhi located near Delhi Technological University (formerly Delhi College of Engineering or DCE). Badli is nearby NH 1 with Rohini on east, Samaypur Industrial Area at Samaypur on west, the outer ring road forms the north boundary.

Kundli Industrial Area, Delhi Western Peripheral Expressway and Rajiv Gandhi Education City on Grand Trunk Road (NH 44) also lie in its vicinity. It is also connected by the under implementation Delhi-Sonipat Metro extension of Yellow line to be completed in Phase IV by March 2022.
