= Nahri, Sonipat =

Nahri is a village in Sonipat district of Haryana, India.

== Location and administration ==
Nahri is a rural settlement positioned within the Sonipat tehsil of Haryana's Sonipat district. Geographically situated near the Haryana-Delhi border, the village lies approximately 20 to 25 kilometers away from New Delhi.

== Community ==
Nahri was named after Nayan Singh Chauhan who was the grandson of Tej Singh who was the founder of Gohana.

Nahri village features a significant presence of the Rajput community, specifically those belonging to the Chauhan clan. For generations, the Chauhans have been deeply embedded in the local administration, land ownership, and social hierarchy of the region.

=== Origins and the 36 Villages ===
The Chauhans of Nahri do not exist in isolation; they are a vital node in a much larger, historically significant network of 36 Chauhan Rajput villages scattered across the Sonipat district. The ancestry of this sprawling network is traced back to the city of Gohana, which acts as the foundational capital and regional epicenter for the clan. Historical records indicate Gohana was established by the Chauhan leader, Rana Tej Singh Chauhan.

=== Zaildari System and Main Villages ===
While Nahri remains a crucial part of this agrarian fabric, the most dominant Chauhan villages in the immediate area are Murthal, Kundli and Jakhauli. Unlike traditional panchayats, these primary villages historically managed the surrounding territories through the Zaildar system. Zaildars functioned as regional feudal authorities, tasked with overseeing vast agricultural estates, gathering revenue, and upholding local law and order.

The demographic and administrative weight of these nodal villages was cemented by their respective Zaildars:

- Murthal anchors the 24-village corridor and stands today as the most populous Rajput-dominated village in Sonipat, with a Chauhan population nearing 18,000. Its historical foundation and governance are credited to Zaildar Rana Malhan Singh Chauhan.
- Jakhauli operated as another massive regional power center and was historically commanded by the influential Zaildar Rana Harphul Singh.
