= Sant Ram Deswal =

Indian writer and educator

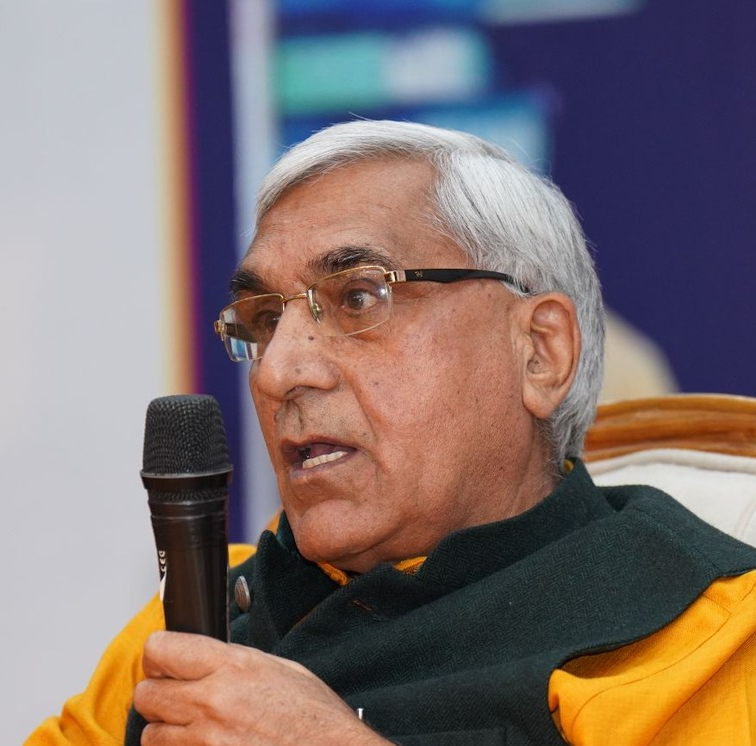
- Dr. Sant Ram Deswal
- Born: April 24, 1955 (age 71); Jhajjar, Haryana, India
- Occupations: Retired Professor, Writer, Editor, Journalist
- Known for: Hindi Literature, Haryanvi Folk Literature
- Spouse: Dr. Rajkala Deswal
- Awards: Padma Shri

Sant Ram Deswal (born 24 April 1955) is an Indian educator, writer, editor, orator and journalist, primarily known for his contributions to Hindi literature and Haryanvi folk literature. In 2025, he was conferred the Padma Shri, India’s fourth-highest civilian award, for his work in literature and education.

== Early life and education ==
Dr. Sant Ram Deswal 'Somya' was born in Khedka village of Jhajjar district, Haryana on 24 April 1955. He is the son of Shri. Sada Ram Deswal and Smt. Darka Devi. He holds multiple advanced degrees and certifications. He has earned a Ph.D. and M.Phil. in Hindi, along with M.A. degrees in both Hindi and English from Maharshi Dayanand University, Rohtak. He also holds an LL.B. (Bachelor of Law), a Postgraduate Diploma in Journalism and Mass Communication, a Postgraduate Diploma in English-Hindi Translation and a Certificate Course in the French language.

== Career ==
Deswal worked as a Professor of Hindi at Chhotu Ram Arya College in Sonipat, after which he shifted his focus entirely to writing and editing. He is pursuing a D.Litt. in Hindi from Agra University and works as a Hindi expert and consultant for both government and private sectors. As a full-time author, he continues his independent literary pursuits while also offering free legal services as an advocate at the District Court, Sonipat.In addition, he serves as an educational consultant and manages various literary, cultural, and social initiatives and holds the position of Associate Editor at Jagat Mahan magazine. He delivers extension lectures at various institutions and has contributed over 100 radio talks on All India Radio, along with several programs on Doordarshan.

== Research ==
Deswal has guided 14 M.Phil. scholars and supervised 4 Ph.D. scholars in the field of Hindi literature. He has presented 20 research papers at national seminars and published 10 research papers in academic journals. Six research works have been completed on his works at various universities, which have contributed to the publication of the book titled - "Dr. Sant Ram Deswal ke Lalit Lok Nibandh."

== Books ==
As an author, his work spans across various genres like poetry, navgeet, gazal, folklore, folk literature, lalit nibandh, travelogue, memoirs, biography, etc. and more than 2 dozen books have been published till date under various categories:

Lalit Nibandh:

- Sanskriti Ki Khoj, ISBN 978-93-84254-69-9
- Hansa, Boliye Mere Ram ISBN 978-93-84254-50-6
- Ikkeesvin Sadi Ke Lalit Nibandh ISBN 978-93-84249-44-1
- Sanskriti Darpan ISBN 978-93-84254-15-5
- Lok Path ISBN 978-81-931359-8-3
- Sanskriti: Swaroop Evam Bhumandalikaran ISBN 978-81-904301-5-9
- Aangan Mein Mor Nacha, Kisne Dekha ISBN 978-81-7043-611-9
- Lok Alok

Haryana Ka Lok Sahitya Aur Sanskriti (Haryanvi Folk Literature & Culture):

- Haryana Ki Sanskriti Evam Kala ISBN 978-81-905647-1-7
- Haryana Ke Lok Sahitya Mein Kadka Vidha ISBN 978-93-84259-50-1
- Haryana Ka Lok Sahitya: Asphut Vidhayen ISBN 978-93-94627-20-8
- Janakavi Fauji Mehr Singh Granthavali, ISBN 978-93-84254-28-5
- Haryana Ki Sanskriti Ke Pratimaan

Bhartiya Sanskriti (Indian Culture):

- Bhartiya Sanskriti Ki Avdharna, ISBN 978-93-84259-70-9

Kavya (Poetry):

Hindi Kavya:

- Zindagi Aur Bata ISBN 978-93-94627-63-5
- Prem Na Haat Bikaye
- Pat Katha Badalti Rehti Hai
- Manzil Ki Aur

Haryanvi Kavya:

- Kankrit Ke Jungle Mein ISBN 978-93-94627-09-3
- Ankahe Dard ISBN 81-88796-239-3

Jeevni (Biography):

- Deenbandhu Chhotu Ram Ki Jeevni ISBN 978-93-94627-57-4

Sansmaran (Memoir):

- Smritiyon Ke Sopan ISBN 978-93-84254-45-2

Yatra Vitrant (Travelogue):

- Safar Jari Hai ISBN 978-81-951797-5-6

Samiksha Granth (Criticism):

- Hindi Lalit Nibandh: Swaroop Evam Mulyankan

Anuvaad (Translation):

- Acchha Bhojan (Hindi to Haryanvi), ISBN 978-81-237-9664-2
- Haddi Tootan Pe (Hindi to Haryanvi) ISBN 978-81-237-9669-7

== Journalism and editorial work ==
Deswal has been a columnist for leading national newspapers, including Dainik Tribune, Jansatta, Navbharat Times and Dainik Haribhoomi. He has also authored hundreds of articles in various newspapers and magazines on literature, culture, society and public discourse.He has served as the guest editor for Harigandha, a journal of the Haryana Sahitya Akademi, and has edited several literary magazines.

== Awards and recognition ==
Deswal has received various awards for his contributions to literature, education, journalism and social service. In 2025, he was honored with the Padma Shri Award in the field of Literature and Education.

His other awards include the following:

- Mahakavi Surdas Ajeevan Sahitya Sadhna Samman (2018) – awarded by the Haryana Sahitya Akademi with ₹5 lakh.
- Jan Kavi Mehr Singh Samman (2014)- awarded by the Haryana Sahitya Akademi with ₹2lakh.
- Best Book Award for Lok Alok (2005) from the Haryana Sahitya Academy
- Best Book Award for Ankahe Dard (2010) from the Haryana Sahitya Academy
- Folklore Translation Consolation Award by the Sahitya Academy, Delhi
- Bal Mukund Gupta Sahitya Samman
- Sarvottam Patrakarita Samman
- Sarvottam Shikshak Samman
- Lok Sahitya Shiromani Samman
- Hindi Sahastrabdi Samman
- Sonepat Ratna Samman
- Kavya Kalash Samman
- Panchvati Samman
- Appreciation Certificates from Government of India, Governor of Haryana, and the Higher Education Department, Haryana.

== Personal life ==
Currently, he resides at Sonipat, Haryana. He is married to Dr. Rajkala Deswal, a retired Hindi Professor and a contributor to Hindi literature and Haryanvi folk literature.

== Sources ==
- Padma Shri recipients 2025
- Hindi literature
- Press Information Bureau Release, 27.05.2025
- Among Padma Shri awardees, author from Haryana who lost father at 3, INDIAN EXPRESS, 26.01.2025
- Haryana Padma Shri: Dr. Santram Deswal 'Saumya' Honored with Padma Shri for Contributions to Literature and Education, BABUSHAHI, 26.01.2025
- पुत्र-पुत्रवधू ने बिना बताए किया आवेदन और पिता को मिल गया पद्मश्री, DAINIK TRIBUNE, 28.01.2025
- केंद्रीय ऊर्जा मंत्री से साहित्यकार डॉ. संतराम देशवाल ने की शिष्टाचार मुलाकात, MH One News, 29.01.2025
- जागृति धाम में पद्मश्री डॉ. संतराम देशवाल का अभिनंदन, AMAR UJALA, 17.02.2025
- CM honours Padma Shri awardee Dr.Sant Ram Deswal and paralympic gold medalist Harvinder, PUNJAB NEWS LINE, 09.03.2025
- Saini meets Haryana Padma Shri awardees, HINDUSTAN TIMES, 10.03.2025
- हरविन्द्र कल्याण ने विधानसभा के बजट सत्र के दौरान डॉ. संतराम देशवाल का अपनी तथा पूरे सदन की तरफ से किया स्वागत, NEWS UPDATE INDIA, 13.03.2025
- विधानसभा अध्यक्ष ने पद्म श्री सन्तराम देशवाल का किया स्वागत, HINDUSTAN SAMACHAR, 13.03.2025
- दिल्ली एन सी आर के बुद्धिजीवियों ने किया डॉ सन्तराम देशवाल का अभिनन्दन, ARTH PRAKASH, 03.05.2025
- साहित्यकार डॉ. संतराम देशवाल पद्मश्री पुरस्कार से सम्मानित, AMAR UJALA, 28.05.2025
- 30 से ज्यादा किताबें लिखकर साहित्य साधना कर रहे पद्मश्री संतराम देशवाल, राष्ट्रपति द्रौपदी मुर्मू ने किया सम्मानित, JAGRAN, 28.05.2025
- सोनीपत के साहित्यकार संतराम देशवाल को मिला पदम श्री सम्मान दिल्ली में राष्ट्रपति ने सम्मान से नवाजा 28 साल शिक्षक रहे, DAINIK BHASKAR, 28.05.2025
- साहित्यकार एवं लेखक संतराम देशवाल को राष्ट्रपति ने दिया पद्मश्री पुरस्कार, DAINIK TRIBUNE, 28.05.2025
- Dr. Sant Ram Deswal Honoured with Padma Shri Award 2025 for Contribution to Literature and Education, IMPRESSIVE TIMES, 30.05.2025
- Sant Ram Deswal honoured with Padma Shri Award 2025, Millennium Post, 31.05.2025
- Dr Sant Ram Deswal honoured with Padma Shri Award 2025, YUGMARG, 31.05.2025
- Dr Sant Ram Deswal honoured with Padma Shri Award 2025, STATE TIMES, 31.05.2025
- झज्जर DC ने डॉ. संतराम को दी बधाई:पद्मश्री से हुए थे सम्मानित, बोले- हरियाणवी भाषा में मील का पत्थर साबित हुए, DAINIK BHASKAR, 31.05.2025
- Dr Sant Ram Deswal honoured with Padma Shri Award 2025, STATESMAN, 01.06.2025
- Dr Sant Ram Deswal awarded Padma Shri for contributions to literature, education, DAILY PIONEER, 02.06.2025
- Dr Sant Ram Deswal receives Padma Shri for contribution to literature and education, TELEGRAPH, 03.06.2025
- Padma Shri Award news in leading newspaper, FINANCIAL EXPRESS, 04.06.2025
- Dr Sant Ram Deswal awarded Padma Shri for contributions to literature, education, HARIBHOOMI, 05.06.2025
- डॉ. देशवाल की उपलब्धियां युवाओं के लिए प्रेरणादायक : डीसी, AMAR UJALA, 05.06.2025
- Padma Shri awardee Dr Sant Ram Deswal welcomed in Jhajjar, THE TRIBUNE, 06.06.2025
- सोनीपत में सीपेट में हिंदी पर कार्यशाला में पहुंचे पद्मश्री:संतराम देसवाल बोले- राजभाषा से राष्ट्रभाषा बनेगी हिंदी; ये भारतीय संस्कार की भाषा, DAINIK BHASKAR, 27.06.2025
