= Maharshi Dayanand University =

University in Rohtak, Haryana, India

- Other name: MDU
- Former name: University of Rohtak
- Motto: Vidya Vindate Amritam (Learning bestows the nectar of life)
- Type: State Govt. University
- Established: 1976; 50 years ago
- Affiliations: UGC, NAAC, AICTE
- Chancellor: Governor of Haryana
- Vice-Chancellor: Milap Punia
- Students: 170,000
- Location: Rohtak, Haryana, India; 28°54′00″N 76°34′12″E
- Campus: Urban
- Website: mdu.ac.in

Maharshi Dayanand University (also called M.D. University or simply MDU; formerly University of Rohtak) is an Indian public university in Rohtak, Haryana. Established in 1976, the university is named after the noted Indian social reformer Dayananda Saraswati. It has its jurisdiction over entire state of Haryana.

Maharshi Dayanand University, ab initio established as Rohtak University, Rohtak, came into existence by Act No. 25 of 1975 of the Haryana Legislative Assembly in 1976, with the objective to promote inter-disciplinary higher education and research in the fields of environmental, ":Status::" Success ": ecological and life sciences. It was rechristened as Maharshi Dayanand University in 1977 after the name of a great visionary and social reformer, Maharshi Dayanand. Firstly, the name of University was Rohtak University but name of University was changed by Pandit Ramchander Arya and became Maharshi Dayanand University. It had a unitary and residential character in its nascent stage but became an affiliating university in November 1978. The university secured the recognition of the University Grants Commission – the higher education regulatory body of India – for central government grants on 16 March 1979.

== History ==
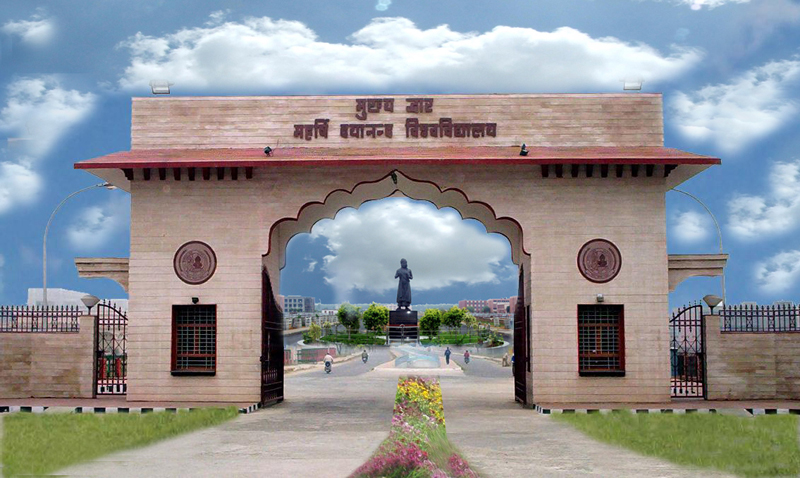
MDU Main Entrance Gate

While Kurukshetra University was the only state university at the time of the formation of the state of Haryana in 1966, with partial affiliation of state colleges with Panjab University. Later, deaffiliation of Haryana colleges from Panjab University and the growing needs of higher education in Haryana, the new University of Rohtak was established at the erstwhile regional center of Punjab University at Rohtak. Later the university was renamed as Maharshi Dayanand University. A large, lush green 700-acre main campus was established for the needs of the University at Delhi Road.

A former satellite campus, the Indira Gandhi Post Graduate Regional Center in Rewari, was awarded university status on its own (as Indira Gandhi University) in April 2013.

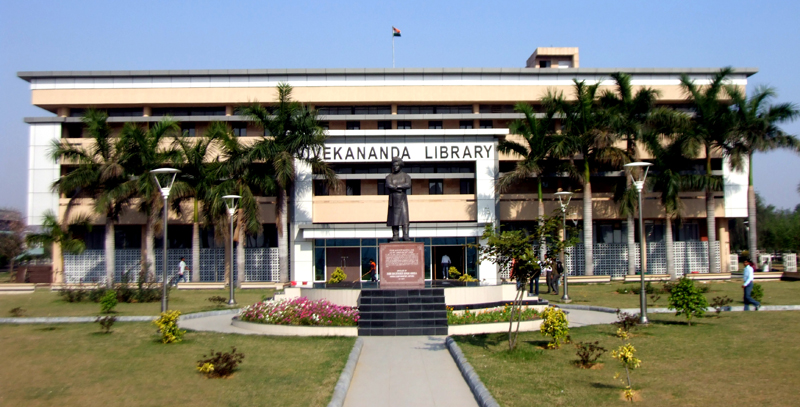
Vivekanand Central Library At MDU Campus .

== Academics ==
MDU offers undergraduate degrees in arts, law, commerce, science and engineering programs, awarding BA, BSc, BCom, BALLB Bachelor of Engineering (BE) and Bachelor of Technology (B.Tech) degrees. The university also offers postgraduate programs that lead to Master of Technology (M.Tech.), Master of Science (MSc) by research, Master of Business Administration (MBA), Master of Computer Applications (MCA)LLM, Msc, MA, MCom, MBA and doctorate (Ph.D.). The MSc and PhD are research degrees.

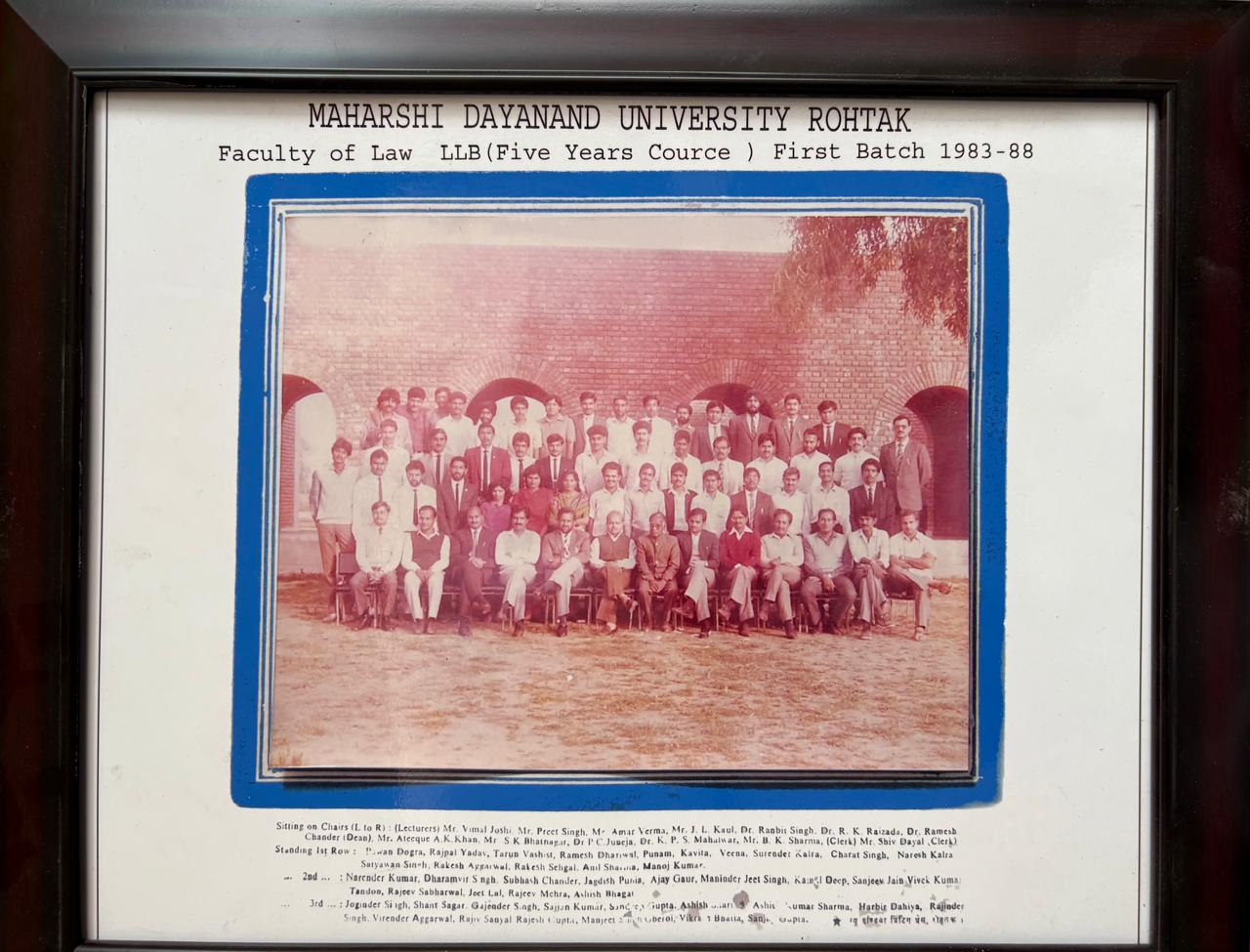
In India, B.A.L.L.B. 5 year program was first started by Maharshi Dayanand University, Rohtak in 1983 and the first batch passed out in 1988.

=== Accreditation ===
The university was accredited by the National Assessment and Accreditation Council in 2019 with a grade of A+, at CGPA 3.44 out of overall 4.00.

=== Rankings ===
University and college rankings

General – India
- NIRF (Overall) (2024): 101–150
- NIRF (Universities) (2024): All Over National 101st In All India 35th Rank at State Public Universities

Engineering – India
- NIRF (2024): 201-300

Pharmacy – India
- NIRF (2024): 38

The National Institutional Ranking Framework (NIRF) ranked Maharshi Dayanand University 35th among state public universities, and 38th in pharmacy ranking in 2024.

== Affiliated colleges ==
Its jurisdiction extends over 5 districts: Faridabad, Jhajjar, Palwal, Rohtak, and Sonepat.

== Notable alumni ==
- Arvind Kumar Sharma — Cabinet Minister in Government of Haryana and former Member of Lok Sabha
- Avinash Gehlot - Cabinet Minister of Social Justice & Empowerment Department in Government of Rajasthan
- Balwan Poonia - Indian politician and farmer activist from Bhadra, Rajasthan.
- Bimla Singh Solanki -Indian politician and a member of the 16th and 17 Legislative Assembly of India.
- Captain Deepak Sharma — Kirti Chakra (2011)
- Dungar Ram Gedar - Indian politician and a member of the 16th Rajasthan Assembly representing Suratgarh Assembly constituency.
- Geeta Phogat — freestyle wrestler
- Jaideep Ahlawat — Bollywood actor
- Jaswant Singh - former Chief Justice of Tripura High Court and Judge of Orissa High Court and Punjab and Haryana High Court.
- Pawan Kumar — freestyle wrestler
- Sakshi Maharaj - Swami Sachchidanand Hari Sakshi Ji Maharaj, is an Indian political and religious leader belonging to the Bharatiya Janata Party.
- Sakshi Malik — Olympic Bronze-medalist
- Sanjay Singh - Indian politician and former Member of the Haryana Legislative Assembly from the Sohna-Taoru constituency in the Gurgaon and Nuh district of Haryana.
- Sant Ram Deswal - Indian educator, writer, editor, orator and journalist, primarily known for his contributions to Hindi literature and Haryanvi folk literature.
- Sukhda Pritam - Indian judge, presently working as Additional District and Sessions Judge in the State of Haryana.
- Suryakant Sharma is an Indian judge of the Supreme Court of India, set to become the 53rd Chief Justice of India.
- Tika Ram Jully - former Cabinet Minister of Social Justice, Empowerment & Jail Department & Minister of State of Labour Department in Government of Rajasthan.
- Vivek Malek - American attorney, businessman, and politician who is the first State Treasurer of Missouri.

== See also ==
- DLC State University of Performing And Visual Arts
- State Institute of Film and Television
