= Samaypur =

Samaypur is an urban village in North Delhi prominently located with NH-1 (GT Karnal Road) on one side and Badli Railway Station & Samaypur Badli Metro Station on the other. Gayatri Yadav is the Municipal Councilor of Samaypur. She is the wife of Badli MLA Aahir Deepak Chaudhary. The village belongs to the Yadav Community, having majority of the Yadavs of 'Nirvan' gotra. The house-holds still follow the 'Dehat' culture very proudly. The adjacent villages such as Badli, Libaspur, Haiderpur, Naharpur, also comprises Yadav community.

== Geography ==
The transport center, Sanjay Gandhi Transport Nagar and the residential areas, Teachers Colony, Yadav Nagar, Shiv Puri, Prem Nagar and Mandir Mohalla are part of the village.

The area is dominated by industries and a local market catering to the nearby area, with the railway underbridge the area is well connected to Rohini sub-city. The area was declared an extensive industrial area after the Samaypur village land had been consolidated in 1953-1954.

== Facilities ==
- Metro Station - Samaypur Badli
- Railway Station - Badli (preferably situated in samaypur)
- Bus Stations - Libaspur, Samaypur, Badli Railway Station
- State Bank of India - Samaypur
- Bank Of Baroda - Samaypur
- Post Office (Samaypur)
- Police Station Samaypur
- HDFC Bank-Samaypur
- Hospital

== Connectivity ==
Libaspur is the nearest Bus Station on GT Road with it being at a distance of approximately 1 km (0.62 mi) Samaypur Badli is Delhi Metro Station on yellow line. Badli Railway is nearest Railway Station, which makes it connected to various parts of Delhi.

Place	Distance from Samaypur
ITO	20 km (12 mi).
CP	15 km (9.3 mi).

== Samaypur Industrial Area ==
Samaypur Industrial Area is one of the important Industrial areas Amritsar Delhi Kolkata Industrial Corridor, in the west Delhi and east of Sonipat. To its west lie Kundli Industrial Area, Rajiv Gandhi Education City in Sonipat city and Deenbandhu Chhotu Ram University of Science and Technology in Murthal, and to its east lie the Badli Industrial Area and Delhi Technological University India. Nearby are the Delhi Western Peripheral Expressway, Grand Trunk Road (NH 44) and the planned Delhi-Sonipat Rapid Regional Rail Transport System (RRTS). It is also connected by the under implementation Delhi-Sonipat Metro extension of Yellow line to be completed in Phase iV by March 2022.
