= Sukhda Pritam =

Indian judge

Judge
- In office 13, April 2011 – Till date

Advocate in Supreme Court of India
- In office September 2004 – January 2011

Personal details
- Born: 1 June 1982 (age 44) Kurukshetra district, Haryana, India
- Parents: Justice Pritam Pal (father); Maya Pritam (mother)
- Education: Panjab University, Chandigarh
- Occupation: Judge
- Awards: Best Athlete, Gold medalist in LL.B. and LL.M.

Sukhda Pritam is an Indian judge in the State of Haryana. She is Additional District and Sessions Judge.

Presently, she is presiding over the court for heinous crimes against women. Recently, her court had awarded life sentence to a man who had murdered a woman and threw her in a well.

The mother who had killed her 3 years old daughter was also sentenced to life by the court lately: https://timesofindia.indiatimes.com/city/chandigarh/woman-sentenced-to-life-term-for-killing-3-yr-old-daughter-in-amritsar-hotel/articleshow/131251442.cms

She has remained Director for Centre for Research and Planning in the Supreme Court of India for two years from 2023 to 2025. The Research Centre had worked with full vibrance under the leadership of the then Chief Justice of India. Many significant publications were published to bring legal reforms. She worked as Chief Judicial Magistrate, Ambala prior to her posting in Supreme Court, where she worked in full swing in support of access to justice for marginalised sections of the society. She also worked as Joint Member Secretary, Haryana State Legal Services Authority in 2020-21.

She remained Deputy Registrar(Judicial) for two years at National Green Tribunal, Delhi. She was earlier working as Additional Civil Judge (Sr.) Division in District Courts Sonipat since April 2016, where she presided over Juvenile Justice Board and worked for rehabilitation of child offenders. She was transferred and promoted from Chandigarh to Sonipat on 13 April 2016.

Her Father Justice Pritam Pal is a retired High Court Judge and was later appointed as Lokayukta, an anti-corruption ombudsman body of Haryana. After serving as Lokayukta her father retired from services on 18 January 2016.

== Career ==
=== Judge ===
Sukhda Pritam in Special Home Sonipat while being welcomed by Authorities.

She joined as a Judge and was appointed in Panchkula District Courts. Thereafter she was transferred on deputation to the Chandigarh District Courts where she served till April 2016. She earned many distinctions during her service as Judge in Chandigarh. She was known to be a Judge of strict discipline and was one of the Judges who started Video Conferencing in the District Courts Chandigarh while serving as Duty Magistrate. She handled many high-profile cases including trial of Kuldeep Bishnoi, founder of HJC, Haryana. Kuldeep Bishnoi charges were later dismissed. In 2015 she ordered medical examination of an accused who alleged custodial beating by Chandigarh Police during custody. She was praised all around area for her efforts for the accused. She was also praised for her letter to the Governor of Punjab regarding human trafficking due to which a big scandal of trafficking was busted in Chandigarh. Accused of theft of heritage furniture of Chandigarh were produced before her.

=== Lawyer ===
Dr. Sukhda Pritam practiced as a lawyer before the Hon'ble Supreme Court of India prior to her selection in the Judiciary. During her appearance before the Supreme Court, she was standing counsel for the State of Haryana and has many judgments to her credit. She represented the state in many high profile matters.

== Other works and personal life ==
She has a flair of writing from her childhood days. She was selected for an international competition of poetry in 2002. Her poetry was nominated for world champion amateur poet in 2002 and also she was invited to USA. She belongs to a well known family of Haryana who are followers of Arya Samaj. Daughter of Justice Pritam Pal, she herself is involved in many charitable works in Haryana. They are engaged in various social works including free medical camps, providing quality education to the needy and promoting cultural harmony by various methods. Her father donated various antique items to the museum of Kurukshetra University for preserving the same or usage of them in any mean devised by the university authorities. Her father launched Social Justice Front on Oct 2, 2016 to work for needy. She has given presentations and lectures on Juvenile Law for its effective implementation at State Judicial Academy, Chandigarh as well as to police and various agencies at District Headquarters. She has also written a book on the Juvenile law enacted in 2015 with the title “Juvenile Justice in Indian Perspective”. She is an accredited certified mediator from London and have alse been trained in India as mediator.
