= Libas Pur =

- City
- Location in India
- Coordinates: 28.7511°N 77.14072°E
- Country: India
- State: Delhi
- District: North Delhi

Population (2001)
  - Total: 27,935

Languages
  - Official: Hindi, English
- Time zone: UTC+5:30 (IST)

Libas Pur is a village in the north district in Delhi, India.

== Demographics ==
Historical population
Year	Pop.	±%
2001	27,940	—
2011	44,375	+58.8%
Source: Government of India

In 2011, Libas Pur had a population of 44,375, with 24,059 males and 20,316 females. It grew by 58.5% from 2001, when it had a population of 27,940.
