= Kundli, Haryana =

Town in Haryana, India

Kundli Kundli
- Town
- Location in Haryana, India Kundli (India)
- Coordinates: 28.990°N 77.022°E
- Country: India
- Region: North India
- State: Haryana
- District: Sonipat

Government
  - M.P.: SATPAL BRAHMACHARI (INC)
  - M.L.A.: Kavita Jain (BJP)
- Elevation: 224.15 m (735.4 ft)

Population
  - Total: 100,000

Languages
  - Official: Hindi, Haryanvi
  - Second Official: Haryanvi
- Time zone: UTC+5.30 (Indian Standard Time)
- PIN: 131001
- Telephone Code: +91-130
- ISO 3166 code: IN-HR
- Vehicle registration: HR-10, HR-69 (Commercial Vehicles), HR-99 (Temporary)
- Sex Ratio: 1.19 ♂/♀
- Literacy: 73%
- Website: www.sonipat.nic.in

Kundli is a town and municipal committee in Sonipat, in Sonipat tehsil of Sonipat district in the Indian state of Haryana.

As of 2017, it had a population of 100,000. It lies on Western Peripheral Expressway, Eastern Peripheral Expressway and Delhi-Amritsar NH-1 (presently NH-44). Kundli also lies on the planned Delhi-Sonipat Rapid Regional Rail Transport System (RRTS) and Delhi Metro extension.

== History ==
Kundli is historically associated with the Chauhan Rajput community, which has long been a prominent group in parts of the Sonipat district of Haryana. In the Sonipat region and surrounding areas of northern Haryana, many Rajputs—particularly those belonging to the Chauhan clan—traditionally use the surname Rana, a title historically associated with feudal authority and martial status. The use of Rana as a surname among Rajputs in this region is locally recognized as a marker of lineage and historical social position.

According to local tradition, the settlement of Kundli was founded by Kundan Singh, who is believed to have been the brother of Tej Singh, the founder of Gohana. Historically, members of the Rajput community in the surrounding villages like Jakhauli, Murthal held considerable influence and served as zaildars and local landholding elites during the colonial period.

== Geography ==
Kundli is 8.604 km from its tehsil headquarters at Rai. Kundli is located 1.6 km (1 mile) north of the Singhu Border, 9.2 km (5.7 miles) southeast of Sonipat city center, 31 km (19.3 miles) northwest of central Delhi and 221 km (137 miles) from its state headquarters Chandigarh. Other villages in Rai Mandal are Akbarpur Barota, Assawarpur, Aurangabad, Badhmalik, Badkhalsa, Bahalgarh, Bazidpur Saboli, Bhaire Bankipur, Bhowapur, Bindhrloi, Chhatehara.

Nearby villages with distance are Sersa (0.936 km), Janti Kalan (3.181 km), Nangal Kalan (3.550 km), Rasoi (3.633 km), Aterna (4.152 km), Bazidpur Saboli (4.209 km), Nathupur (4.536 km).

== Industrial Model Township Kundli ==
Industrial Model Township, Kundli (IMT Kundli) or Kundli Industrial Area, established by the HSIIDC in NCR, is a large Industrial areas of Haryana on the northern border of Delhi adjacent to Narela and it lies south of Sonipat. It is the location of National Institute of Food Technology Entrepreneurship and Management (NIFTEM), an upcoming premier research institute of food science by the union Ministry of Food Processing Industries (MoFPI), Government of India. To its west lie Rajiv Gandhi Education City in Sonipat city and Deenbandhu Chhotu Ram University of Science and Technology in Murthal, and to its east lie the Samaypur Industrial Area at Samaypur, Badli Industrial Area at Badli and Delhi Technological University India. It is also connected by the under implementation Delhi-Sonipat Metro extension of Yellow line to be completed in Phase iV by March 2022. It is part of Amritsar Delhi Kolkata Industrial Corridor (ADKIC) on Eastern Dedicated Freight Corridor (EDFC), that is on track. Dr. B. Ravi Pillai, owner of RP Group and the richest Indian billionaire in Dubai and Middle East which employ over 70,000 employees, offered to CM of Haryana in December 2017 to invest in logistics company in Integrated Multimodel Logistics Hub, Nangal Chaudhary (North India's largest logistics hub) and in Prime Minister's Housing for All (PMAY) low-cost urban housing in 3 Industrial Model Townships (IMT) along Delhi Western Peripheral Expressway in IMT Bahadurgarh, IMT Kundli, Sonipat and IMT Manesar with construction to be completed within 1 year.

== See also ==
- Eastern Peripheral Expressway
- Western Peripheral Expressway
