= Deenbandhu Chhotu Ram University of Science and Technology =

State university in Haryana, India

- Former names: Chhotu Ram State College of Engineering, Murthal
- Type: Public
- Established: 1986; 40 years ago (as College); 2006; 20 years ago (as University)
- Chancellor: Governor of Haryana
- Vice-Chancellor: Shree Prakash Singh
- Location: Murthal, Sonipat, Haryana, 131027, India; 29°1′38″N 77°3′44″E
- Campus: 273 acres (1.10 km^{2})
- Language: Haryanvi, English, Hindi
- Website: www.dcrustm.ac.in

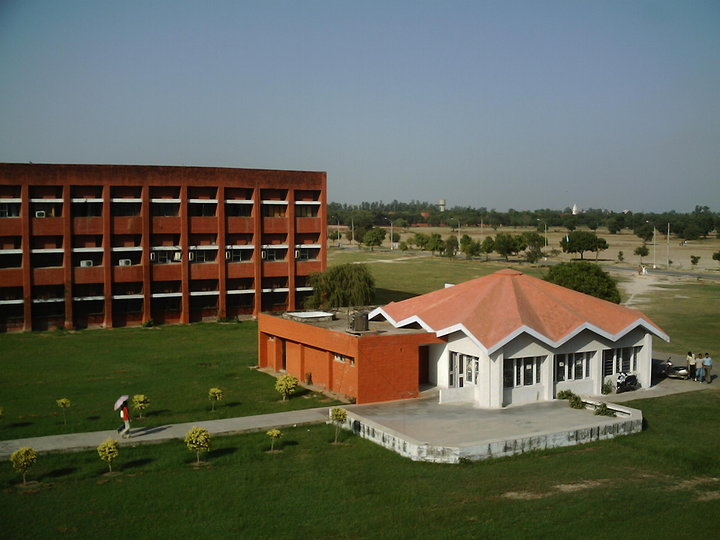
Panormic view of Deenbandhu Chhotu Ram University of Science and Technology (DCRUST) at Murthal.

Deenbandhu Chhotu Ram University of Science and Technology (DCRUST), formerly Chhotu Ram State College of Engineering, Murthal (CRSCE), is a state university located in Murthal, Sonipat, Haryana, India. It was established in 2006 by an Act of the Government of Haryana, upgrading a 1986 established college.

== History ==
It was founded in 1986 by the Government of Haryana in memory of Sir Chhotu Ram (1881–1945). It was then known as the Chhotu Ram State College of Engineering, Murthal until the government of Haryana upgraded it to University on 6 November 2006 through an Act 29 of 2006 of the Legislature of the state of Haryana. The university has been considered eligible for grants under Section 12(B) of UGC Act, 1956 in March 2009.

== Location ==
The university is in Murthal on National Highway No. 44, 50 km (31 mi) from Inter State Bus Terminal, Delhi and 4 km (2.5 mi) from Sonipat bus stand. The campus of the college has been developed on 273 acres (1.10 km^{2}) of land which falls within the industrial and commercial belt extending from Kundli to Panipat.

== Departments ==
The university has the following departments:

=== Engineering/science ===
- Architecture
- Biomedical
- Biotechnology
- Center of Excellence for Energy and Environment Studies (CEEES)
- Chemical
- Civil
- Computer science
- Electrical
- Electronics and communication
- Mechanical
- Education

=== Management and humanities ===
- Humanities
- Management

=== Sciences and mathematics ===
- Chemistry
- Mathematics
- Physics
- Environmental science

== Hostels ==
The university campus has a total of 7 hostels, three for women and 4 for men. The capacity of the women's hostels is 450; the men's hostels, 966.

== Foreign collaborations ==
The university is a member of Association of Commonwealth Universities (ACU).

== See also ==
- List of universities in India
