= Gohana =

- City
- Interactive map of Gohana
- Location in Haryana, India Gohana (India)
- Coordinates: 29.13°N 76.9°E
- Country: India
- State: Haryana
- District: Sonipat

Government
  - Type: Chairman
  - Body: Nagar Parishad Gohana
- Elevation: 225 m (738 ft)

Population (2017)
  - Total: 65,708

Languages
  - Official: Hindi, Regional Haryanvi
- Time zone: UTC+5:30 (IST)
- PIN: 131301
- Telephone code: 91-01263
- ISO 3166 code: IN-HR
- Vehicle registration: HR 11

Gohana is a city and a municipal council, near Sonipat city in the Sonipat district of the Indian state of Haryana. Gohana is the oldest tehsil of Haryana. Gohana is also famous all over the world for its Maturam's Jalebi (which is also the national sweet of India).

== Communities ==
According to local traditions, Gohana was founded by a Rajput chieftain named Tej Singh. He is believed to have ruled the region extending up to Murthal and parts of present-day Karnal district. The town is historically dominated by Rajputs of the Chauhan clan, who played a significant role in shaping its early political and social structure.

== Geography ==
Gohana is located at 29.13°N 76.7°E. Its topography consists mainly of low plains, but its south-central area has a small plateau. Gohana's 43 km^{2} (27.95sq mile) land area has an average elevation of 225 metres (738 feet).

Thanesar is located at 29°58′N 76°49′E.

== Demographics ==
Gohana city is situated in the Sonipat district of Haryana. It is the main subdivision with a population of more than 300,000 (as of 2011). It has its own municipality and a constituency for Haryana Vidhan Sabha. There are around 86 villages in Gohana. It is located in the west of the Sonipat District, 40 km from the town of Sonipat. Earlier, it was part of Rohtak district. Gohana is the oldest tehsil of Haryana. It was declared a tehsil in 1826 by the British, and some structures which show evidence of that time are still standing in the city: the City police station, Government Boys' Senior Secondary School, Government Girls' Senior Secondary School, and the Jain Senior Secondary School are some examples. Gohana City has its own courts and Mini Secretariat, situated on Sonipat Road, in the eastern part of the city. "Nagar Parishad Gohana" is the governing body of the city.

It is famous for jumbo-sized Maturam Jalebis since the British era. Each jalebi generally weighs 250 grams and is made from Desi Ghee.

In ancient times, Gohana was known as Gavambhavana and was considered a sacred place. Prithviraj Chauhan constructed a fort here, which was later destroyed by Muhammad Ghori after defeating Prithviraj Chauhan in 1192. Later, in 1947, all Muslim families left this place and migrated to Pakistan. Being a tehsil city, people from diverse communities reside in the city.

As of 2011 India census, Gohana had a population of 121,637. Males constitute 53% of the population and females 47%. Gohana has an average literacy rate of 78%, higher than the national average of 74.5%: male literacy is 89%, and female literacy is 65%.

=== Religion ===
==== City ====
Religion in Gohana City
Religion	Population (1911)	Percentage (1911)	Population (1941)	Percentage (1941)
Islam	3,357	61.73%	3,832	56.2%
Hinduism (Note: 1941 census: Including Ad-Dharmis)	1,360	25.01%	2,194	32.18%
Sikhism	5	0.09%	16	0.23%
Others (Note: Including Jainism, Buddhism, Zoroastrianism, Judaism, or not stated)	716	13.17%	776	11.38%
Total Population	5,438	100%	6,818	100%

==== Tehsil ====
Religion in Gohana Tehsil
Religion	Population (1941)	Percentage (1941)
Hinduism	176,682	81.5%
Islam	38,136	17.59%
Sikhism	196	0.09%
Christianity	11	0.01%
Others (Note: Including Jainism, Buddhism, Zoroastrianism, Judaism, or not stated)	1,762	0.81%
Total Population	216,787	100%

== Traveling and distance from major cities nearby ==
Gohana is well connected with major districts and other small towns and villages. There is a national highway NH 71-A that connects Gohana to Rohtak and Panipat - two major districts, and National highway NH 352-A that connects it to district Sonipat and Jind. Trains connect Gohana with Rohtak, Bhiwani and Panipat. The new railway line from Jind to Sonipat through Gohana has been fully functional since 26 June 2016. The city's railway station which was founded in the early 70s has been a junction since 2012.

Distance from major cities

City	Distance	Direction
Chandigarh	202 km	northwest
Jind	50 km	northwest
Panipat	42 km	northeast
Rohtak	33 km	southwest
Sonipat	40 km	southeast
New Delhi	90 km	southeast

== Politics ==
The region has its own seat in Vidhan Sabha, and it comes under Sonipat in the Lok Sabha constituency. The politics of Gohana mostly revolves around caste politics. Jagbir Singh Malik has been the three-time winning member of Vidhan Sabha from Indian National Congress and their member of Parliament is Satpal Bharamchari from INC.

=== Notable politicians of Gohana ===
- Ram Chander Jangra - Rajysabha MP
- Arvind Kumar Sharma - MLA
- Jagbir Singh Malik - 4 times MLA of Gohana Assembly constituency
