= Murthal =

Murthal Morthal Khas
- Village
- Location in Haryana, Sonepat, India Murthal (India)
- Coordinates: 29°2′N 77°5′E
- Country: India
- State: Haryana
- District: Sonipat

Population
  - Total: 16,722

Languages
  - Official: Hindi
  - Official: English, Punjabi
  - Regional: Haryanvi
- Time zone: UTC+5:30 (IST)
- PIN: 131027
- Telephone code: 130
- ISO 3166 code: IN-HR
- Vehicle registration: HR
- Nearest city: Sonipat, New Delhi
- Lok Sabha constituency: Sonepat
- Vidhan Sabha constituency: Rai
- Website: haryana.gov.in

Murthal, also known as Morthal Khas, is a village in Sonipat district of the Indian state of Haryana. It is located 6 kilometres (3.7 mi) north of Sonipat, 45 km (28 mi) from the national capital New Delhi, and 202 km (126 mi) southwest of Chandigarh, the state capital. It is notable for its cuisine.

== Etymology ==
The name Murthal (or Morthal) means peacock's abode. It was named as such by Malhan, a Rajput who was fascinated by the scenery and numerous peacocks present in the area.

== Demographics ==
As per the 2011 Indian Census, Murthal (or Morthal Khas) had a total population of 16,722, of which 8,920 were males and 7,802 were females. Population within the age group of 0 to 6 years was 2,221. The total number of literates in Murthal was 11,325, which constituted 67.7% of the population with male literacy of 74.1% and female literacy of 60.4%. The effective literacy rate of 7+ population of Murthal was 78.1%, of which male literacy rate was 85.9% and female literacy rate was 69.3%. The Scheduled Castes population was 3,258. Murthal had 3,274 households in 2011.

=== Communities ===
According to the 1883 gazetteer of the Gurgaon District, the inhabitants of this village were Jats, mainly those of Antal clan.

== Economy ==
Situated on the on Delhi-Amritsar National Highway, the Haryana Breweries, the Haryana Agro-Industries and various small scale industries are present in and around Murthal set up by the Haryana State Small Industries and Export Corporation.

== Culture ==
=== Cuisine ===
The Dhabas

Since Murthal falls in between many routes, it has become notable for its highway dhabas (small restaurants) and its food delicacies.

== Transport ==
=== Regional Rapid Transport System ===
In December 2020, the Haryana government approved the implementation of Delhi-Panipat Corridor for its Regional Rapid Transport System. The construction will be undertaken in two stages namely, Sarai Kale Khan to Murthal depot and Murthal to Panipat.

== Education ==
=== Universities ===
- Deenbandhu Chhotu Ram University of Science and Technology, also known as DCRUST. Many colleges are affiliated to this university.
- Tau Devi Lal Government Women College, Murthal
