= Nirban =

Rajput warrior

Nirban (also spelled, Nirvan, Nirwan) are a gotra of Agniwanshi Rajput caste.

Some of the villages of Nirvan are in Phauladpur Neemrana Mazarpur, Quni Daultabad near Pataudi, Ahirwal Pataudi, Guliara, Balag Noshehr, Selana and in the Samaypur, Badli and Haiderpur villages of Delhi, paprawat najafghar Delhi. The Sain community of Kondli Village and Naraina Villages converted from their original clan also belonged to the Nirvan Gotra. Fauladpur City, Jhunjhunu (Udaipurwati, Alsisar, Mandrela, Khetri) Alwar are also settled in Western Uttar Pradesh Sikandrabad (bulandshahr).

== See also ==
- Nandvanshi
- Sikligar
