= Rao Gopal Dev =

Revolutionary leader in 19th century India

Rao Gopaldev
- Rao Bahadur
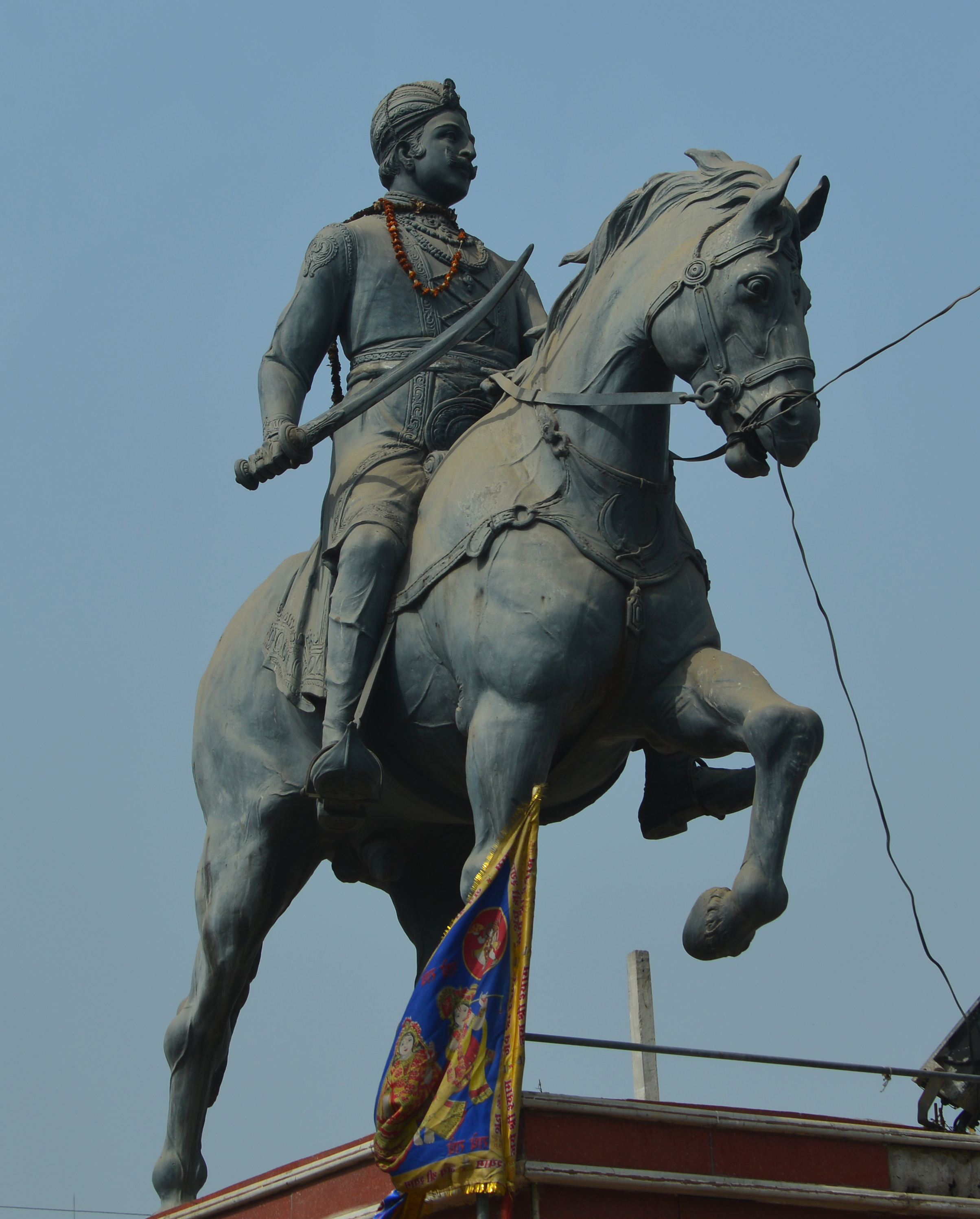
- Rao Gopaldev Chowk, Rewari

Leader of the Indian Rebellion of 1857
- Predecessor: Rao Nathuram
- Successor: British India Govt. 1857–1877; Rao Lal Singh After 1877
- Born: 1829; Rewari, Haryana
- Died: 1862
- Father: Rao Nathuram

Rao Gopaldev Singh, also known as Rao Gopaldev (1829–1862) was the son of Rao Nathuram Singh of Rewari.

== 1857 Revolt ==
He allied himself with his cousin, Rao Tula Ram, during the Indian Rebellion of 1857 and fought the Battle of Nasibpur (Narnaul) Under Rao TulaRam. He was the sixth generation descendant of Rao Shahbaz and first cousin of Rao TulaRam. He inherited personal jagir of 41 villages after the death of his father Rao NathuRam in 1855. His cousin Rao Tula Ram made him commander in chief of Armed forces of the Rewari State. In 1859, Rao Tula Ram's Estate and Rao Gopal Dev's Jagir were confiscated by Britishers.

== Death ==
He Died At The Age Of 33 in 1862.

== See also ==
- Rao Ruda Singh
- Rao Tula Ram
- Rewari
