= Inchhapuri =

- Village
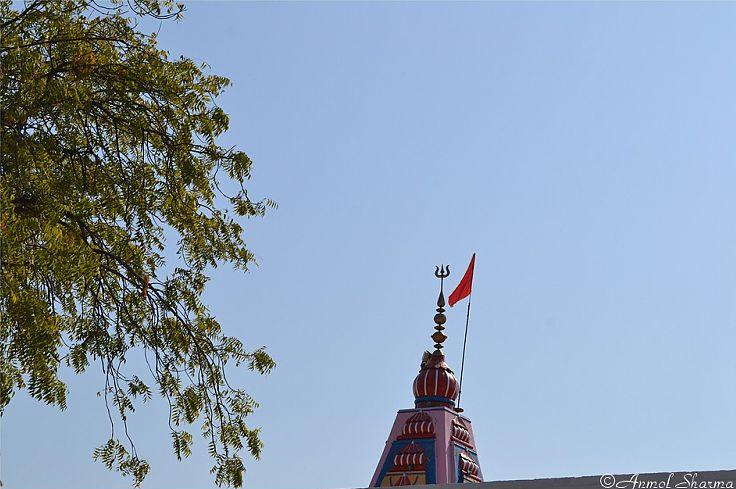
- Interactive map of Inchhapuri
- Coordinates: 28.1913°N 76.4326°E
- Country: India
- State: Haryana
- Time zone: UTC+5:30 (IST)
- PIN: 122414
- Vehicle registration: HR 76

Inchhapuri is a mid-sized village located in the Pataudi tehsil of district Gurgaon in the Indian state of Haryana. It is known for ancient temple of God Shiva. The temple is located in remote area of Gurgaon.

== Overview ==
Inchhapuri is surrounded by farms and the temple's trust don't allow other people to modernize it as in case of some other temples for the sake of originality. The village and its railway station are named after this temple. It is believed that the name is derived Inchhapuri because the Lord Shiv fulfills wishes of the visitors to the temple. It has only one Middle-level school which started as Primary school in 1955. The village is famous in and around because of famous Shiv Temple which holds "Shivaratri Mela" two times a year. Inchhapuri is a Hindi word, English translation means "Fulfillment of one’s internal desire." It is believed that Lord Shiv at Shiv Temple here does this Trick for one and all visitors."Devotees from all walks of life from Delhi / Rewari join the funfair and worship the Lord Shiva. In early past years Wrestling matches were being arranged by the Mela Organiser at Shivaratri Mela. Inchhapuri railway station has started functioning since 1957 and facilitate the devotees for to and fro journey. There are around 8-10 pairs of trains to cater the need of Daily Passengers going to Gurgaon, Delhi and Rewari for their Studies and livelihood.

== Demographics ==
As of 2011 India census, Inchhapuri had a population of 1,831. Males constitute 52% of the population and females 48%. Inchhapuri has an average literacy rate of 81.78%, Higher than the national average of 74%.

Inchhapuri is a medium size village located in Pataudi of Gurgaon district, Haryana with total 368 families residing. The Inchhapuri village has population of 1831 of which 968 are males while 863 are females as per Population Census 2011. In Inchhapuri village population of children with age 0-6 is 223 which makes up 12.18 % of total population of village. Average Sex Ratio of Inchhapuri village is 892 which is higher than Haryana state average of 879. Child Sex Ratio for the Inchhapuri as per census is 742, lower than Haryana average of 834. Inchhapuri village has higher literacy rate compared to Haryana. In 2011, literacy rate of Inchhapuri village was 81.78 % compared to 75.55 % of Haryana. In Inchhapuri Male literacy stands at 91.31 % while female literacy rate was 71.35 %.

As per constitution of India and Panchyati Raaj Act, Inchhapuri village is administrated by Sarpanch (Head of Village) who an elected representative of the village.

Particulars	Total	Male	Female
Total No. of Houses	368	-	-
Population	1,831	968	863
Child (0-6)	223	128	95
Schedule Caste	557	292	265
Schedule Tribe	0	0	0
Literacy	81.78 %	91.31 %	71.35 %
Total Workers	553	471	82
Main Worker	479	0	0
Marginal Worker	74	54	20
