= Uncha Majra =

Uncha Majra is a mid-sized village located in Pataudi, the district of Gurgaon in the state of Haryana in India. It has a population of about 4000 people living in around 700 houses. Floriculture is being adopted by rich farmers of Uncha Majra.

Uncha Majra is famous for agriculture production, especially vegetables, in District Gurgaon. The youngest generation are highly qualified in the field of engineering, MBBS and management from top business school such IIM- Ahmedabad and are well paced in Govt, MNCs as well as in the own business.
