= Sikhism in India =

Indian Sikhs ਭਾਰਤੀ ਸਿੱਖ

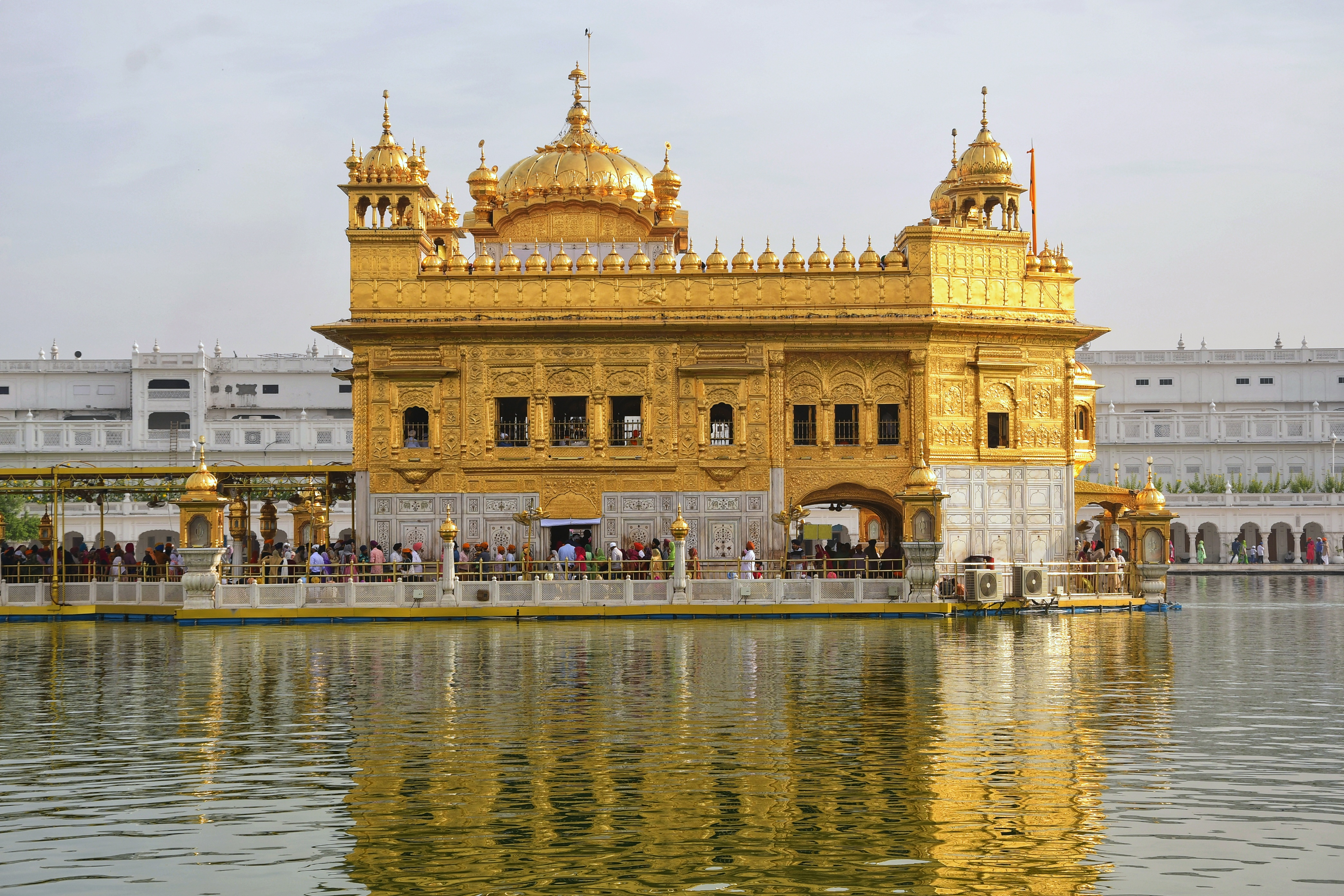
- Gurdwara Darbar Sahib, or the Golden Temple, in Amritsar, Punjab.

Total population
- 20,833,116 ▲1.72% of the total Indian population ▼ (2011)

Regions with significant populations
- Punjab: 16,004,754 (57.69%)
- Haryana: 1,243,752 (4.91%)
- Rajasthan: 872,930 (1.27%)
- Uttar Pradesh: 643,500 (0.32%)
- Delhi: 570,581 (3.40%)

Religions
- Sikhism

Languages
- Punjabi • Hindi • Sindhi • Indian English; Kashmiri • Dogri • Marathi • Bengali • Urdu

Historical Sikh Population
Year	Pop.	±%
1800s	752,232	—
1881	1,853,426	+146.4%
1891	1,907,883	+2.9%
1901	2,195,339	+15.1%
1911	3,014,466	+37.3%
1921	3,238,803	+7.4%
1931	4,306,442	+33.0%
1941	5,691,447	+32.2%
1951	6,862,283	+20.6%
1961	7,862,303	+14.6%
1971	10,360,218	+31.8%
1981	13,119,919	+26.6%
1991	16,420,685	+25.2%
2001	19,237,391	+17.2%
2011	20,833,116	+8.3%
Source: census of India

Indian Sikhs number approximately 21 million people and account for 1.7% of India's population as of 2011, forming the country's fourth-largest religious group. The majority of the nation's Sikhs live in the northern state of Punjab, which is the only Sikh-majority administrative division in the world.

India is home to the vast majority (around 85%) of the global Sikh population of 25 million.

== History ==
=== Partition ===
Sikh organizations, including the Chief Khalsa Dewan and Shiromani Akali Dal led by Master Tara Singh, strongly opposed the partition of India, viewing the possibility of the creation of Pakistan as inviting persecution.

== Demography ==
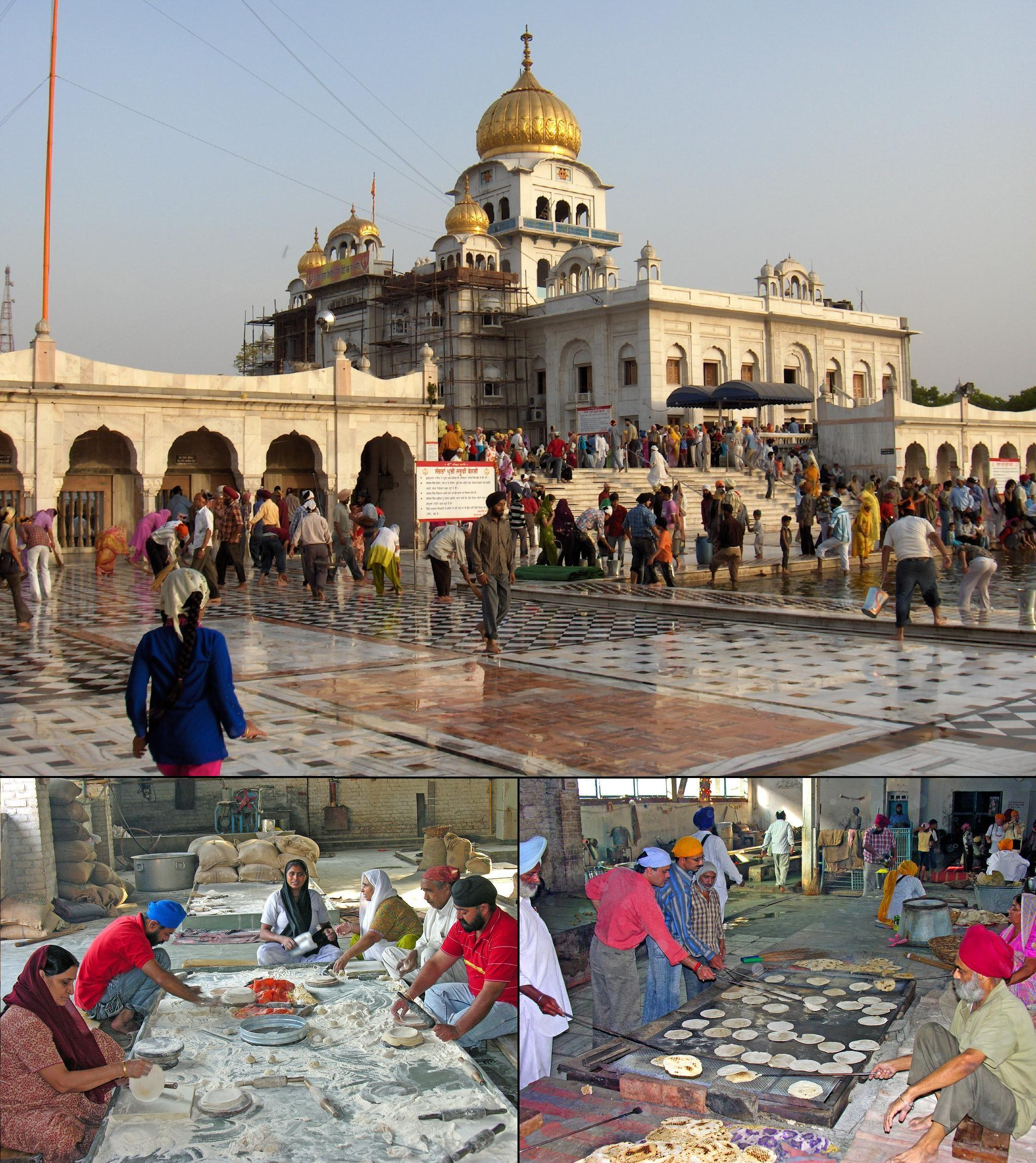
The Gurdwara Bangla Sahib

=== Population ===
India's Sikh population stands at 20.8 million, which is only 1.72% of the country's total population. Out of approximately 25–30 million Sikhs in the world, the majority of them, 20.8–22 million, live in India that is about (83.2%–84.1%) of the world's Sikh population. Sikhs have a fertility rate of 1.6 in India, which is the lowest in the nation as per as according to year 2019–21 estimation.

Out of the total Sikhs in India, 77% are concentrated in state of Punjab. Sikhism is the dominant religion in Punjab, India, where it is followed by 16 million constituting 57.7% of the population, the only Indian state where Sikhism is the majority faith. By 2050, according to Pew research center based on growth rate of current Sikh population between (2001–2011), India will have 30,012,386 Sikhs by half-century which will be more than that of any country including the west.

=== National and ethnic origins ===
Although Punjabi Sikhs form the majority of the Sikh population, the Sikh community is varied and includes people who speak the Pashto language, the Brahui language, the Telugu language, Marathi language, Assamese language, Tamil language, Hindi language, Sindhi language, Bengali language and many more. The many communities following Sikhism is detailed below.

==== Afghan Sikhs ====
The Sikhs of Afghanistan are primarily Punjabi merchants and immigrants. They speak the Punjabi language within themselves but are usually fluent in Dari and occasionally Pashto as well.

==== Bengali Sikhs ====
Sikhism in the Bengal region dates back to 1504 but has declined after the partition. Sikhism first emerged in Bengal when Guru Nanak visited Bengal in 1504 and established a number of Gurdwaras.

By the early 18th century, there were a few Sikhs living in the region of Bengal. One famous Sikh who lived during this time period was Omichand, a local Khatri Sikh banker and landlord who participate in the conspiracy against Nawab Siraj ud-Daulah with the East India Company. The Flemish artist Frans Baltazard Solvyns arrived in Calcutta in 1791 and observed many Sikhs, whom one could differentiate from the rest of the land's inhabitants by their garbs and traditions. He etched depictions of a Khalsa Sikh and a Nanakpanthi, which was published in 1799.

Gurdwara Nanak Shahi is the principal Sikh Gurdwara (prayer hall) in Dhaka, Bangladesh. It is located at the campus of the University of Dhaka and considered to be the biggest of the 7 Gurdwaras in the country. After the Partition of India, the Sikh community left for India.

After the Indo-Pakistani War of 1971 and Bangladesh Liberation War, Indian Sikh soldiers helped renovate the Gurdwaras left in Bangladesh. Shri Guru Tegh Bahadur ji visited Dhaka. There is another Sikh temple known as the Gurudwara Sangat Tola. Many Sikhs also used to visit a well at the ruins of Jafarabad which they believed has waters with curative powers.

There was a presence of Sikhism in Sylhet Division after Guru Nanak's visit in 1508. Kahn Singh Nabha has stated that in memory of Nanak's visit, Gurdwara Sahib Sylhet was established. This Gurdwara was visited twice by Tegh Bahadur and many hukamnamas were issued to this temple by Guru Gobind Singh. In 1897, the gurdwara fell down after the earthquake. Nearly all the Sikhs of Sylhet in the early 18th century were found in North Cachar where they used to work for the Assam Bengal Railway. There are around 1 lakh Bengali people who follow Sikhism as their religion in both West Bengal and Bangladesh.

==== Assamese Sikhs ====
The presence of Sikhism has been existing in Assam for over 200 years. The community traces its origins to the times of Maharaja Ranjit Singh who took his army to Assam and put some influence of the religion towards the locals. According to the 2001 census, there were 22,519 Sikhs in Assam, out of which 4,000 are Assamese Sikhs.

Assamese Sikhs follow the Sikh religion and celebrate Sikh festivals as they also celebrate cultural festivals such as Magh Bihu and wear traditional Assamese dress. Their language is the Assamese language.

==== Agrahari Sikhs ====
Agrahari Sikh is a Sikh community found in Bihar and Jharkhand. Agrahari Sikhs, also known as Bihari Sikhs, have existed for centuries in Bihar and Jharkhand.

Bihari Sikhs share their culture with the local Bihari community. The men generally wear the local dhoti and women wear the Sari. They also celebrate Hindu festivals such as the Chath festival.

==== Dakhni Sikhs ====
Dakhni Sikhs are from the Deccan Plateau in India located within the states of Telangana and Andhra Pradesh. The traditional dress of women is the sari. The native language of Dakhni Sikhs is the Telugu language.

==== Kashmiri Sikhs ====
Ethnic Kashmiri Sikhs speak the Kashmiri language and observe Kashmiri culture. They trace their religious heritage to the influence of Sikh soldiers who settled in Kashmir under the Maharaja Ranjit Singh rule in 1819. However, the soldiers permanently settled in Kashmir.

==== Pahari Sikhs ====
Pahari Sikhs, also known as the Sikhs of Poonch, are a distinctive Sikh community hailing from the Poonch region of Pakistan, originally part of the historic region of Jammu and Kashmir. They predominantly speak Pahari Punjabi, a dialect that has evolved in the hilly terrain of their native land. Historically, many Pahari Sikhs resided in the Poonch region but due to various historical and geopolitical factors, a significant number have migrated and settled in the Jammu district of the present-day Union Territory of Jammu and Kashmir.

==== Punjabi Sikhs ====
Punjabi Sikhs are the native Sikhs of undivided Punjab region who speaks the Punjabi language as their mother tongue and practice Punjabi culture. Their traditional dress includes the Punjabi Salwar Suit, Punjabi Tamba and Kurta, Punjabi juti and Patiala salwar.

In addition to the Sikh festivals using the Nanakshahi calendar, Punjabi Sikhs observe traditional Punjabi festivals using the Punjabi calendar.

==== Sindhi Sikhs ====
In addition to celebrating Sikh festivals, Sindhi Sikhs celebrate cultural festivals such as Cheti Chand, the Sindhi new year. Sindhi Sikhs speak the Sindhi language. Most of the Sindhi Hindus are Nanak Panthis who believe in 10 Sikh Gurus and regularly go to guru dwara and most of the Marriage also takes place in Gurudwara.

==== South Indian Sikhs ====
There are Sikh communities in Karnataka, Andhra Pradesh and Maharashtra who converted to Sikhism centuries ago.

The Sikhs comprise Banjara and Satnami. The process of blending the religion into southern India for the Sikligars began at the time of 10th Sikh Guru Gobind Singh, who came to the Deccan and died in 1708 at Nanded (Maharashtra).

It all came by the Sikligars as they came to southern India as expert arms-making camp followers of the tenth Guru. Sikligar is a compound of the Persian words 'saiqal' and 'gar' meaning a polisher of metal. The traditional occupation of the Sikligars is crafting kitchen implements.

Banjaras are a nomadic tribe who traditionally travelled with merchandise and are found across a large swathe of northern India, as well as in the south. Sikh Banjaras too travelled with armies of the past supplying them with provisions.

== Geographical distribution ==
=== Sikhism by States ===
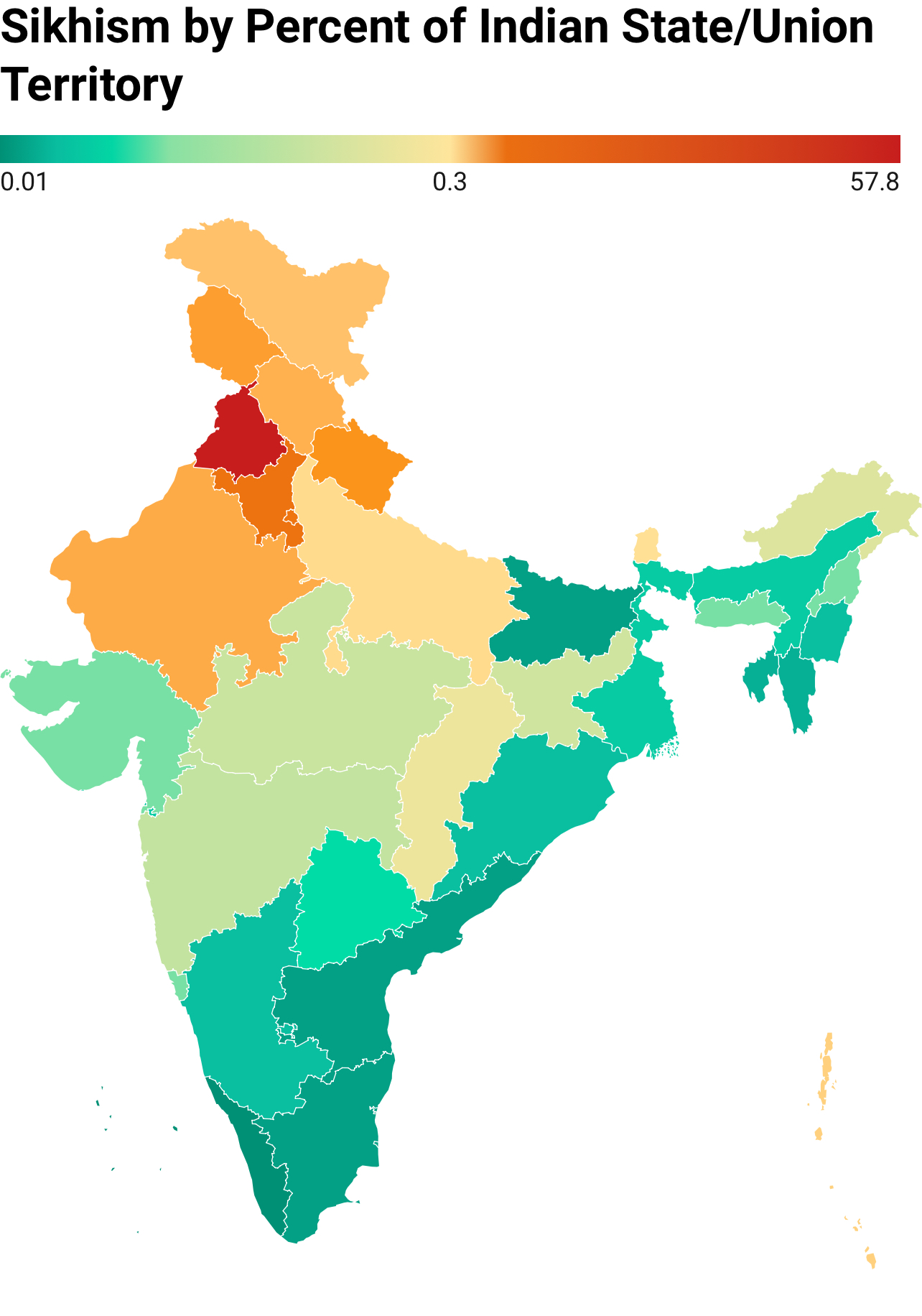
Sikhism by Percent of Indian State/Union Territory, 2011 census

Indian Sikhs by state and union territory
State/U.T.	2001		2011		2022	
State/U.T.	Pop.	%	Pop.	%	Pop.	%
Punjab	14,592,387	59.91%	16,004,754	57.69%		
Haryana	1,170,662	5.54%	1,243,752	4.91%		
Rajasthan	818,420	1.45%	872,930	1.27%		
Uttar Pradesh	678,059	0.41%	643,500	0.32%		
Delhi	555,602	4.01%	570,581	3.40%		
Uttarakhand	212,025	2.50%	236,340	2.34%		
Jammu and Kashmir			232,585	1.90%		
Maharashtra	215,337	0.22%	223,247	0.20%		
Madhya Pradesh	150,772	0.25%	151,412	0.21%		
Chandigarh	145,175	16.12%	138,329	13.11%		
Himachal Pradesh	72,355	1.19%	79,896	1.16%		
Jharkhand	83,358	0.31%	71,422	0.22%		
Chhattisgarh	69,621	0.33%	70,036	0.27%		
West Bengal	66,391	0.08%	63,523	0.07%		
Gujarat	45,587	0.09%	58,246	0.10%		
Telangana			30,340	0.09%		
Karnataka	15,326	0.03%	28,773	0.05%		
Bihar	20,780	0.03%	23,779	0.02%	14,753	0.01%
Odisha	17,492	0.05%	21,991	0.05%		
Assam	22,519	0.08%	20,672	0.07%		
Tamil Nadu	9,545	0.02%	14,601	0.02%		
Andhra Pradesh			9,904	0.02%		
Kerala	2,762	0.01%	3,814	0.01%		
Arunachal Pradesh	1,865	0.17%	3,287	0.24%		
Meghalaya	3,110	0.13%	3,045	0.10%		
Ladakh			2,263	0.83%		
Nagaland	1,152	0.06%	1,890	0.10%		
Sikkim	1,176	0.22%	1,868	0.31%		
Manipur	1,653	0.07%	1,527	0.05%		
Goa	970	0.07%	1,473	0.10%		
Andaman and Nicobar Islands	1,587	0.45%	1,286	0.34%		
Tripura	1,182	0.04%	1,070	0.03%		
Dadra and Nagar Haveli and Daman and Diu	268	0.07%	389	0.07%		
Puducherry	108	0.01%	297	0.02%		
Mizoram	326	0.04%	286	0.03%		
Lakshadweep	6	0.01%	8	0.01%		
India	19,215,730	1.87%	20,833,116	1.72%		

=== Sikhism by Districts ===
These are the 30 districts in India where Sikhs form more than 10% of the population.

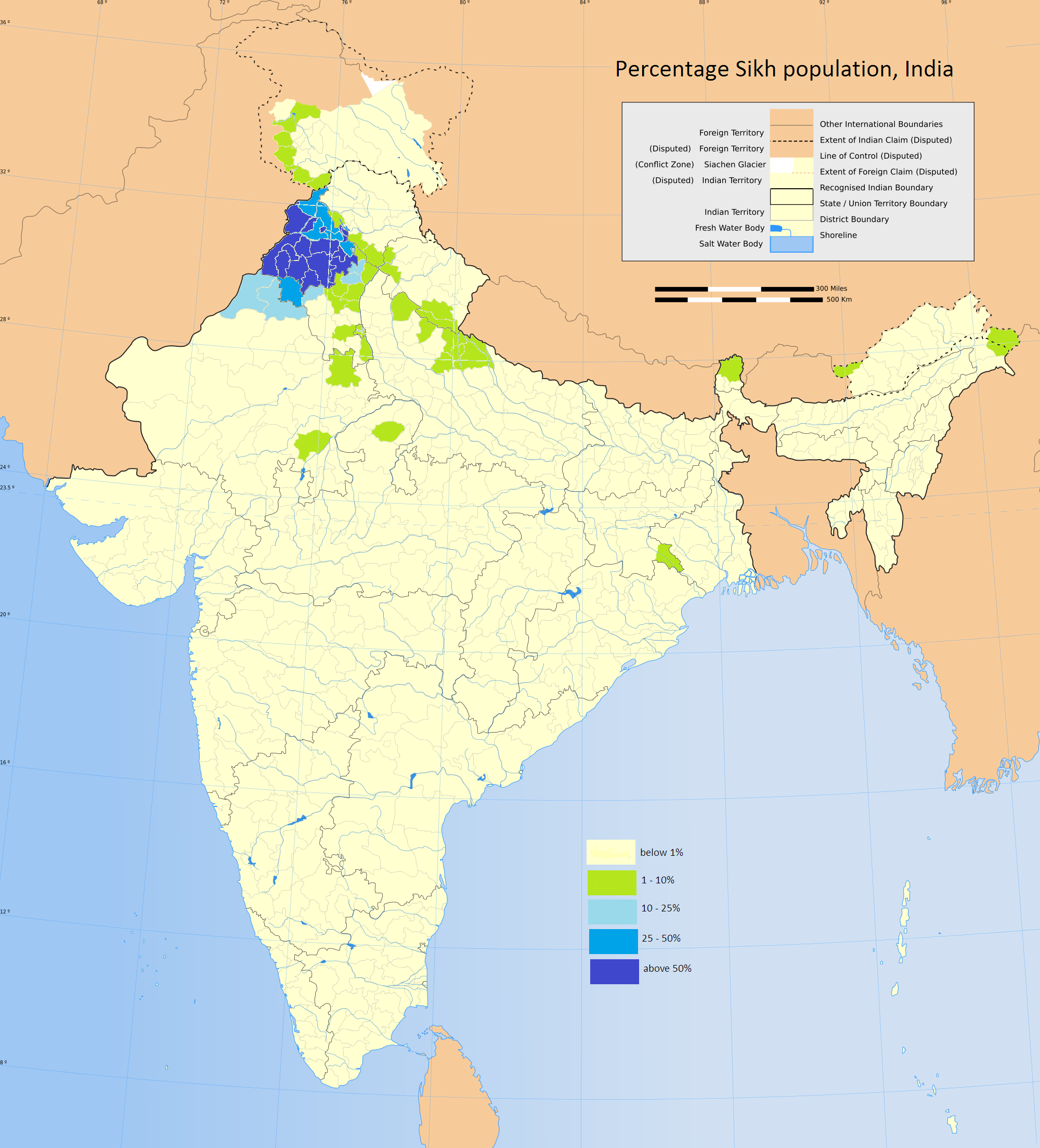
Sikhs as percentage of total population in different districts of India, 2011 Census

District	State	Percentage
Tarn Taran district	Punjab	93.33%
Moga district	Punjab	82.24%
Barnala district	Punjab	78.54%
Mansa district	Punjab	77.75%
Fatehgarh Sahib district	Punjab	71.23%
Bathinda district	Punjab	70.9%
Sri Muktsar Sahib district	Punjab	70.81%
Sangrur district	Punjab	70.08%
Amritsar district	Punjab	68.94%
Firozpur district	Punjab	68.59%
Kapurthala district	Punjab	55.66%
Gurdaspur district	Punjab	58.6%
Patiala district	Punjab	55.91%
Faridkot district	Punjab	55.66%
Ludhiana district	Punjab	53.26%
Rupnagar district	Punjab	52.74%
Malerkotla district	Punjab	50.89%
Mohali district	Punjab	48.15%
Fazilka district	Punjab	39.9%
Hoshiarpur district	Punjab	33.92%
Jalandhar district	Punjab	32.75%
Shaheed Bhagat Singh Nagar district	Punjab	31.5%
Sirsa district	Haryana	26.17%
Ganganagar district	Rajasthan	22.59%
Fatehabad district	Haryana	16.02%
Kurukshetra district	Haryana	14.55%
Chandigarh district	Chandigarh	13.11%
Ambala district	Haryana	12.25%
Hanumangarh district	Rajasthan	12.23%
West Delhi district	Delhi	10.69%

=== Sikhism by Tehsil ===
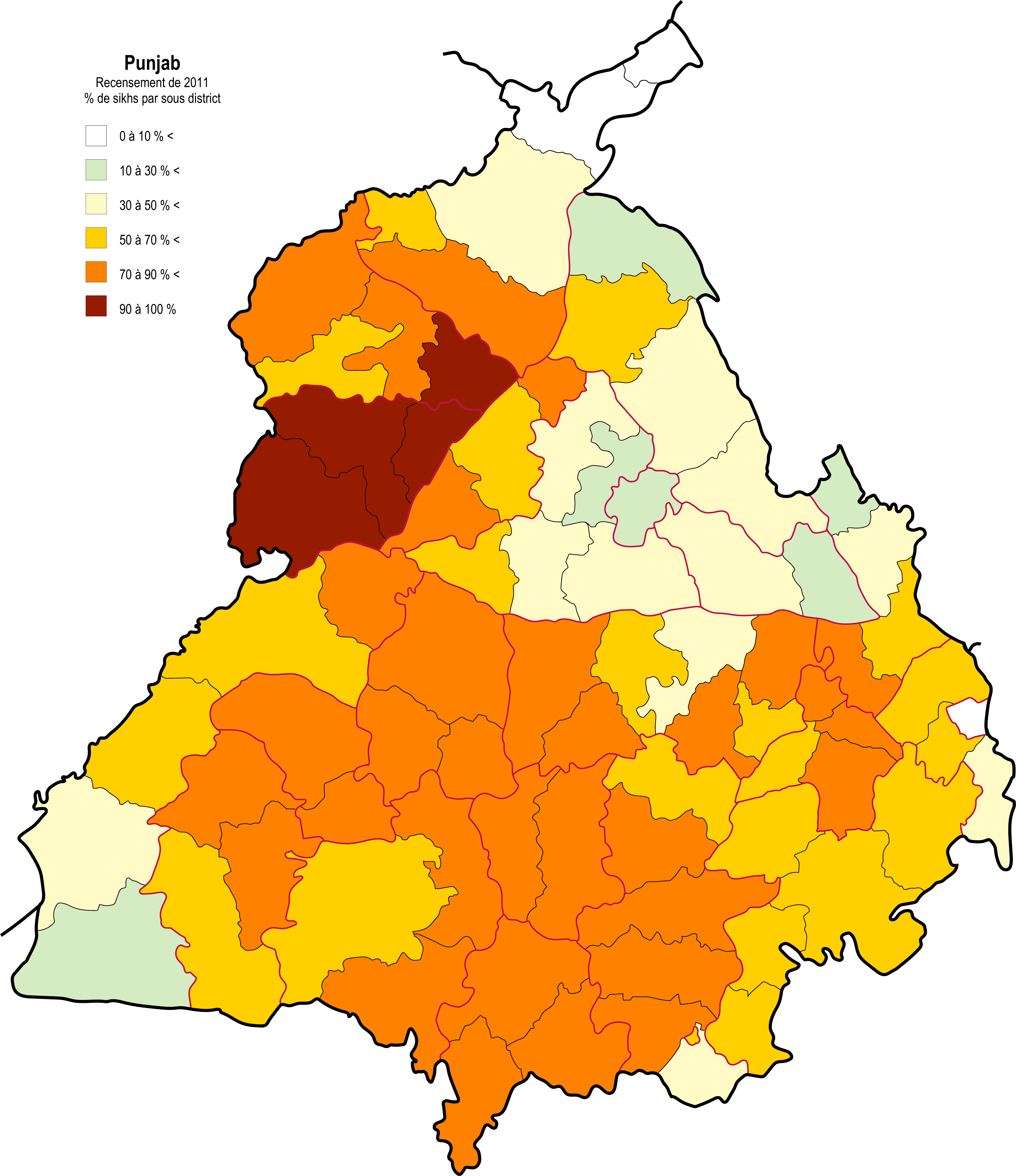
Sikh Distribution by Tehsil in Punjab (2011 Census)

== Notable Indian Sikhs ==
Though Sikhs are a minority in India, the community occupies a significant place in the country. The former Chief Justice of India, Jagdish Singh Khehar, and the former Prime Minister of India, Dr. Manmohan Singh are Sikh, as is former President of India Gyani Zail Singh. Almost every council of ministers in India has included Sikh representatives.

Sikhs are also conspicuous in the Indian army, primarily because of their history as defenders of righteousness, they formed the sword arm of the British empire. The Late Indian officer with a 5 star rank, Arjan Singh, is a Sikh. Sikhs have also led the Indian army through JJ Singh and the Indian Air Force was led by Air Chief Marshal Dilbagh Singh. Sikhs have been prominent in Indian sports, with the Indian individual gold medalist in Olympics, Abhinav Bindra, being a Sikh. Similarly they occupy important official positions, like Deputy Chairman of the Planning Commission, Montek Singh Ahluwalia; governor Surjit Singh Barnala.

Sikhs are also known for entrepreneurial business in India. Milkha Singh, also known as The Flying Sikh, is a former Indian track and field sprinter who was introduced to the sport while serving in the Indian Army. One reason for visibility of Sikhs in the Indian spectrum is the disproportionate role played by the Sikh community during the Indian freedom struggle, with Bhagat Singh remaining a youth icon to Indian youth.

== See also ==
- List of famous Sikhs
- Religion in India
- Cochin Sikhs
- Gurudwara Patthar Sahib, Sikh shrine in Ladakh
- Sikhism in Pakistan
- Sikh culture
