= Gurdwara Patthar Sahib =

Gurudwaras in Ladakh, India

Gurudwara Pathar Sahib
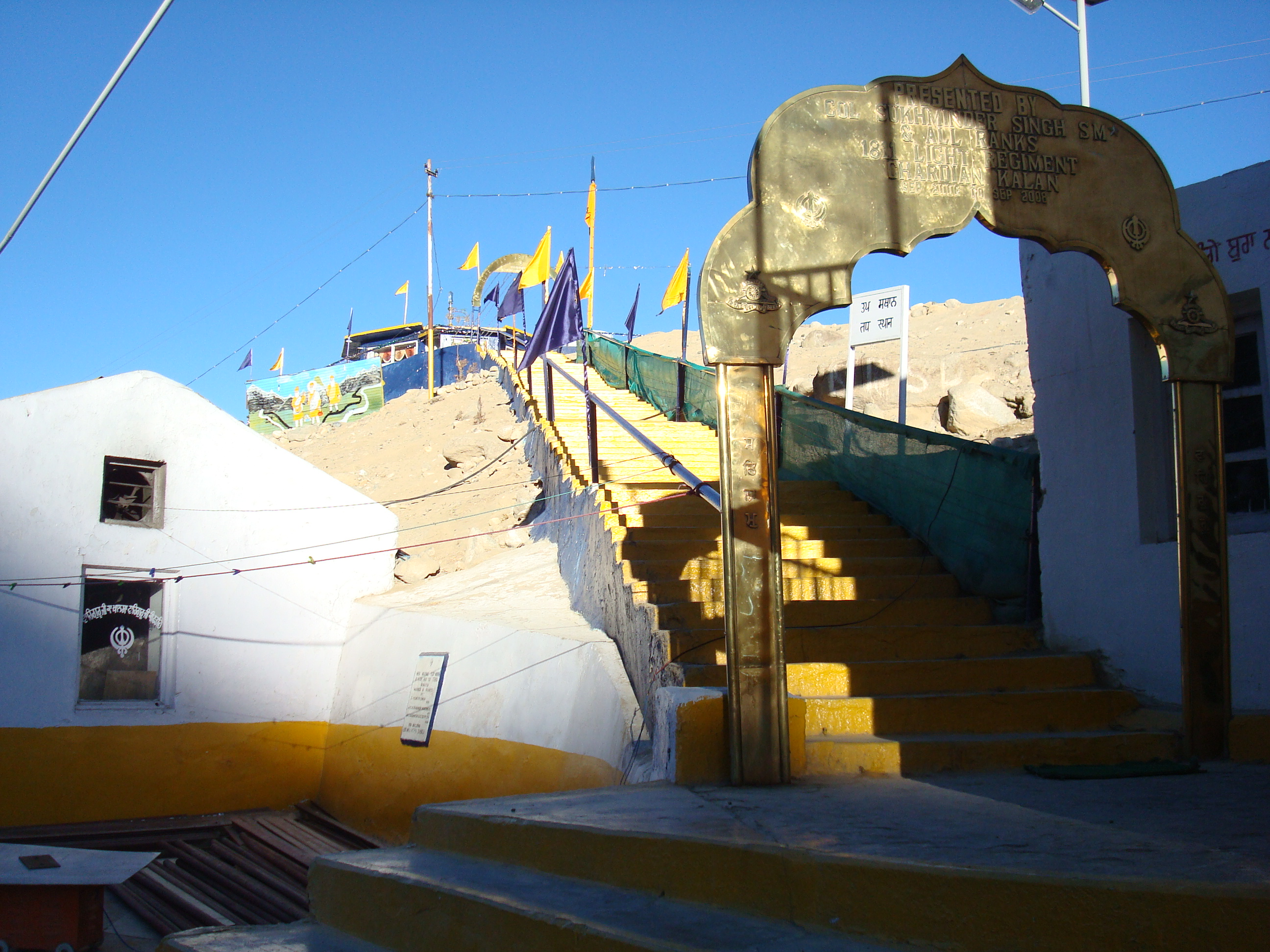

Religion
- Affiliation: Sikhism
- Status: Active

Location
- Location: Leh district, Ladakh, India

Gurdwara Pathar Sahib (sometimes spelled Pathar Saheb or Pathar Sahib) is a Sikh gurdwara located near Leh in the union territory of Ladakh, India. The shrine is built around a large boulder (pathar) associated with traditions connecting the site to Guru Nanak Dev Ji, and it is a frequently visited religious and tourist site on the Srinagar–Leh/Leh–Kargil route.

== Location and access ==
Gurudwara Pathar Sahib lies on the Srinagar–Leh highway (Leh–Kargil road), roughly 20–25 km from Leh city, at high altitude on the cold desert plateau of Ladakh. It is accessible by road from Leh and is commonly visited by travellers en route to or from Leh.

== History and legend ==
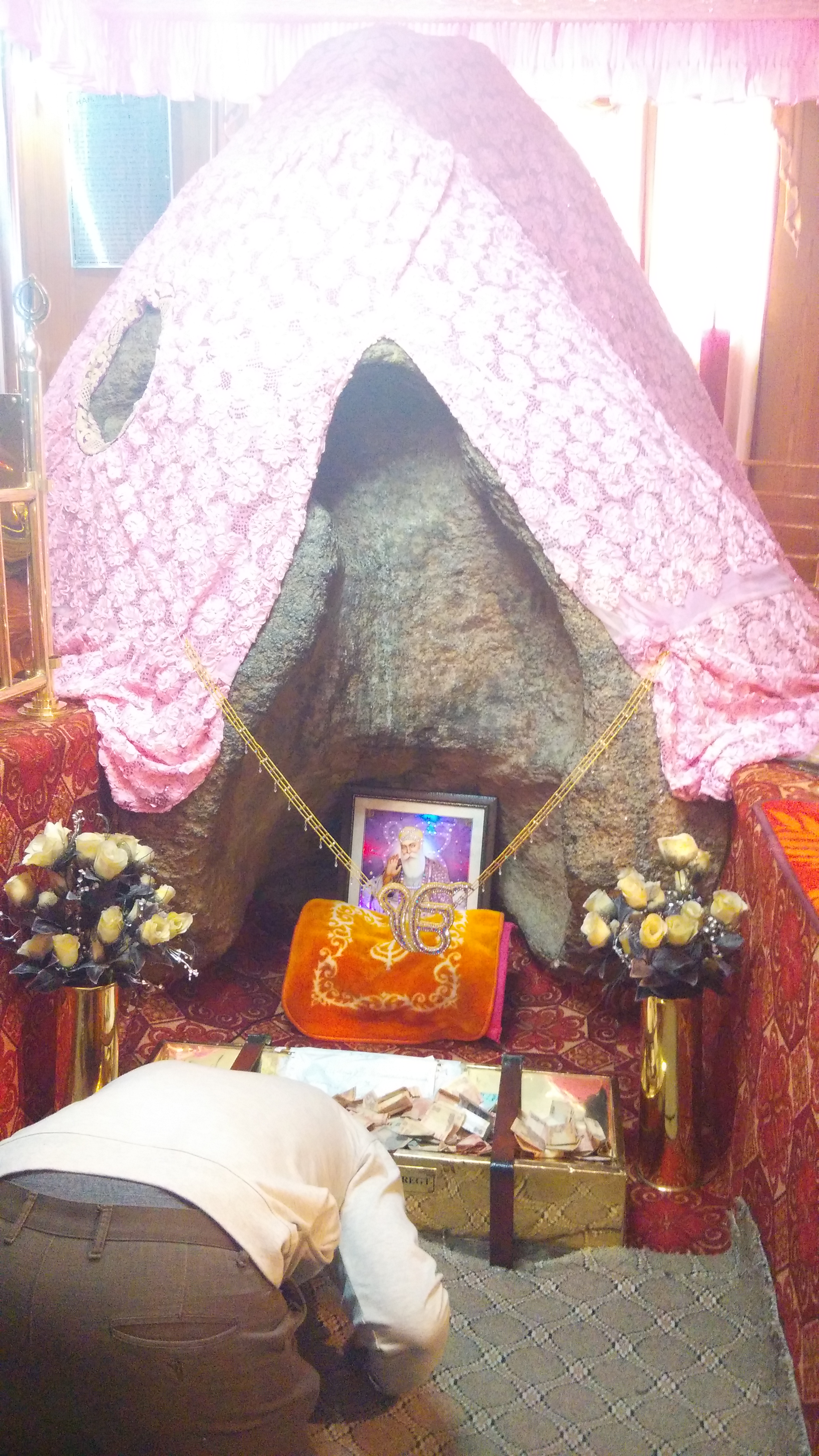
Boulder at the shrine

The history of Gurdwara Pathar Sahib dates back to 1517 CE, when Guru Nanak is believed to have visited Ladakh during his journey from Sikkim, Nepal, and Tibet to Punjab via Srinagar. According to local folklore, a demon living in the area attempted to kill Guru Nanak by rolling a large boulder (pathar) down a hill while he was meditating. The rock is said to have softened upon touching Guru Nanak, leaving the impression of his body while he remained unharmed. When the demon struck the stone with his foot, his footprint also became embedded in it. Realizing Guru Nanak’s spiritual power, the demon repented and was forgiven.

For centuries, the sacred rock was preserved and venerated by Buddhist Lamas, who referred to Guru Nanak as "Lama Nanak" or "Guru Gompka Maharaj." In the 1970s, during the construction of the Leh–Nimmu road, the boulder resurfaced when efforts to remove it were unsuccessful. Following reports of dreams and local testimonies linking the stone with Guru Nanak, the Indian Army preserved the site and constructed the present-day Gurdwara around it.

== Management and maintenance ==
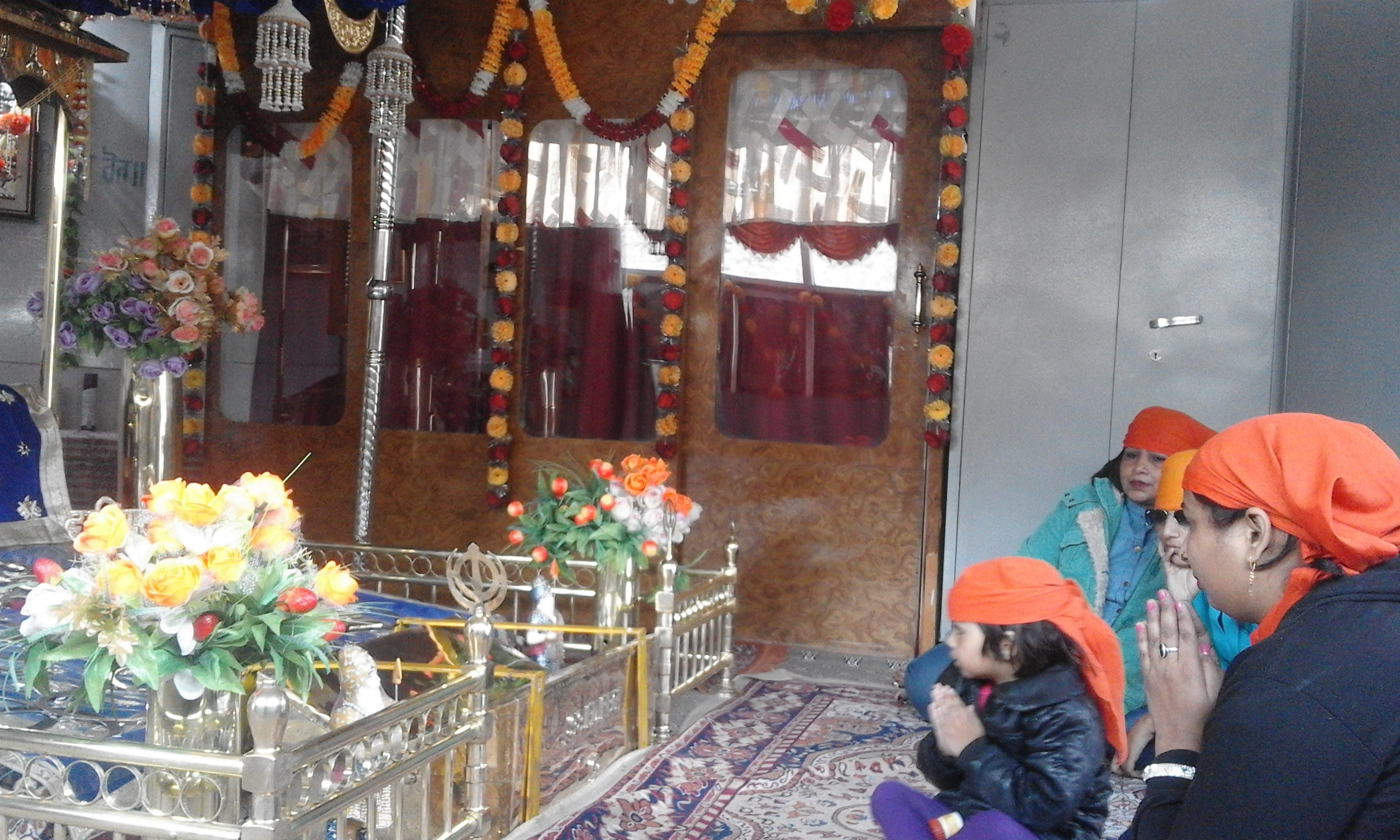

The shrine is maintained by Indian Army as per the Sikh Rehat Maryada or the code of conduct and conventions for Sikhism. The shrine also hosts Langar daily.

== Recent events ==
Visits by public officials and coverage in regional news outlets have highlighted the gurudwara's cultural significance and its role in Ladakh's religious landscape. For example, the Lieutenant Governor of Ladakh paid obeisance at the gurudwara during an official visit in September 2025.

== See also ==
- Sikhism in India
- Tourism in Ladakh
