= State Highway 26 (Haryana) =

Road in Haryana, India

State Highway 26 in Haryana route was Gurgaon-Pataudi-Rewari-Narnaul-Singhana. It is a two-lane road without divider. The total length of State Highway was 120 km.

However, the Rewari-Narnaul segment has been made a national highway NH 11 and is no longer a part of SH 26.

The 52 km long Gurgaon-Pataudi-Rewari segment has also been declared a national highway NH 352W and will be widened to four lanes with flyovers at several junctions.

== See also ==
- List of state highways in Haryana
