= Rewari =

City in Haryana, India

- City
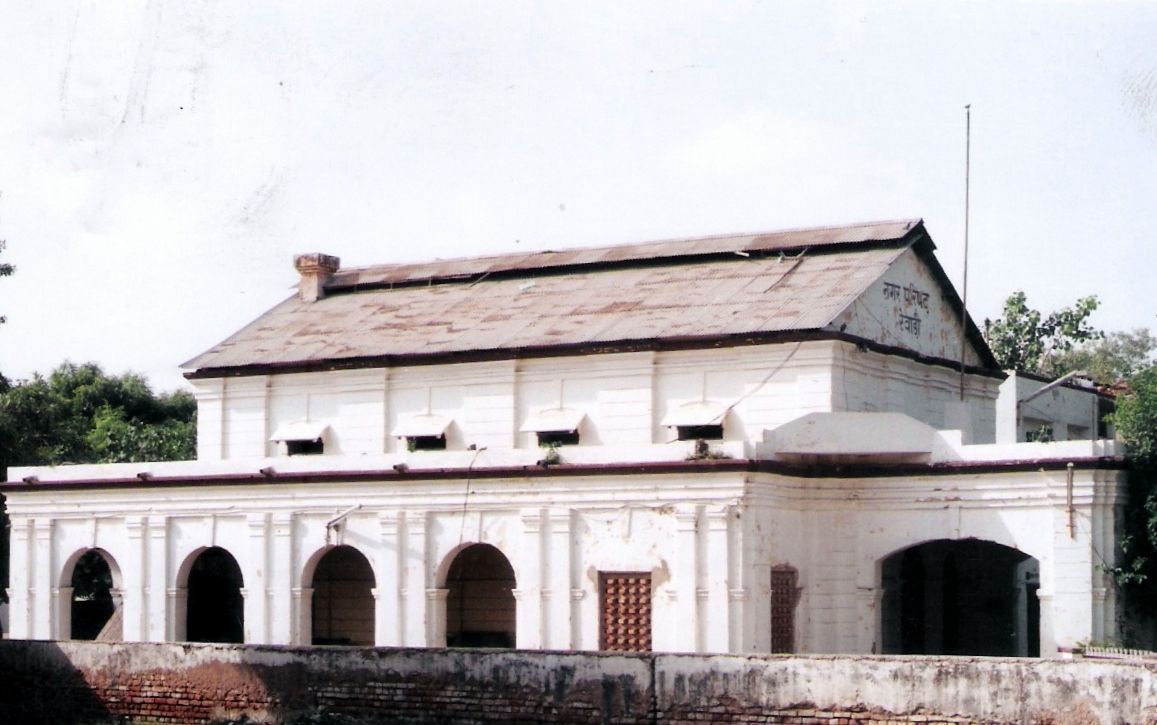
- Rewari Town Hall in Rewari, Haryana

- Location in Haryana, India Rewari (India)
- Coordinates: 28.18°N 76.62°E
- Country: India
- State: Haryana
- District: Rewari

Government
  - Type: Municipal council
  - Body: Municipal Council Rewari

Area
  - Total: 35.93 km^{2} (13.87 sq mi)
- Elevation: 245 m (804 ft)

Population (2011)
  - Total: 143,021
  - Density: 5,740/km^{2} (14,900/sq mi)

Languages
  - Official: Hindi
  - Additional official: English, Punjabi
  - Regional: Ahirwati, Haryanvi
- Time zone: UTC+5:30 (IST)
- PIN: 123401
- Telephone code: 01274
- Vehicle registration: HR-36
- Website: rewari.gov.in

Rewari is a city and a municipal council in Rewari district in the Indian state of Haryana. It is the district headquarters of Rewari district. It is located in south-west Haryana around 82 km from Delhi and 51 km from Gurgaon. It lies in Ahirwal region.

== Etymology ==
During the Mahabharata period in ancient India, a king named Rewat had a daughter named Rewati. The father used to call her Rewa, and founded a village "Rewa Wadi" named after her. Wadi and wada mean a neighbourhood (small and big, respectively) in Hindi and many other Indian languages. When Rewa married Balram, elder brother of Krishna, the king donated the village "Rewa-Wadi" to his daughter. In the course of time, the name Rewa-Wadi became Rewari.

== History ==
=== Mythological origins ===
Rewari is claimed to have been founded by Balarama, the elder brother of Krishna.

=== Medieval ===
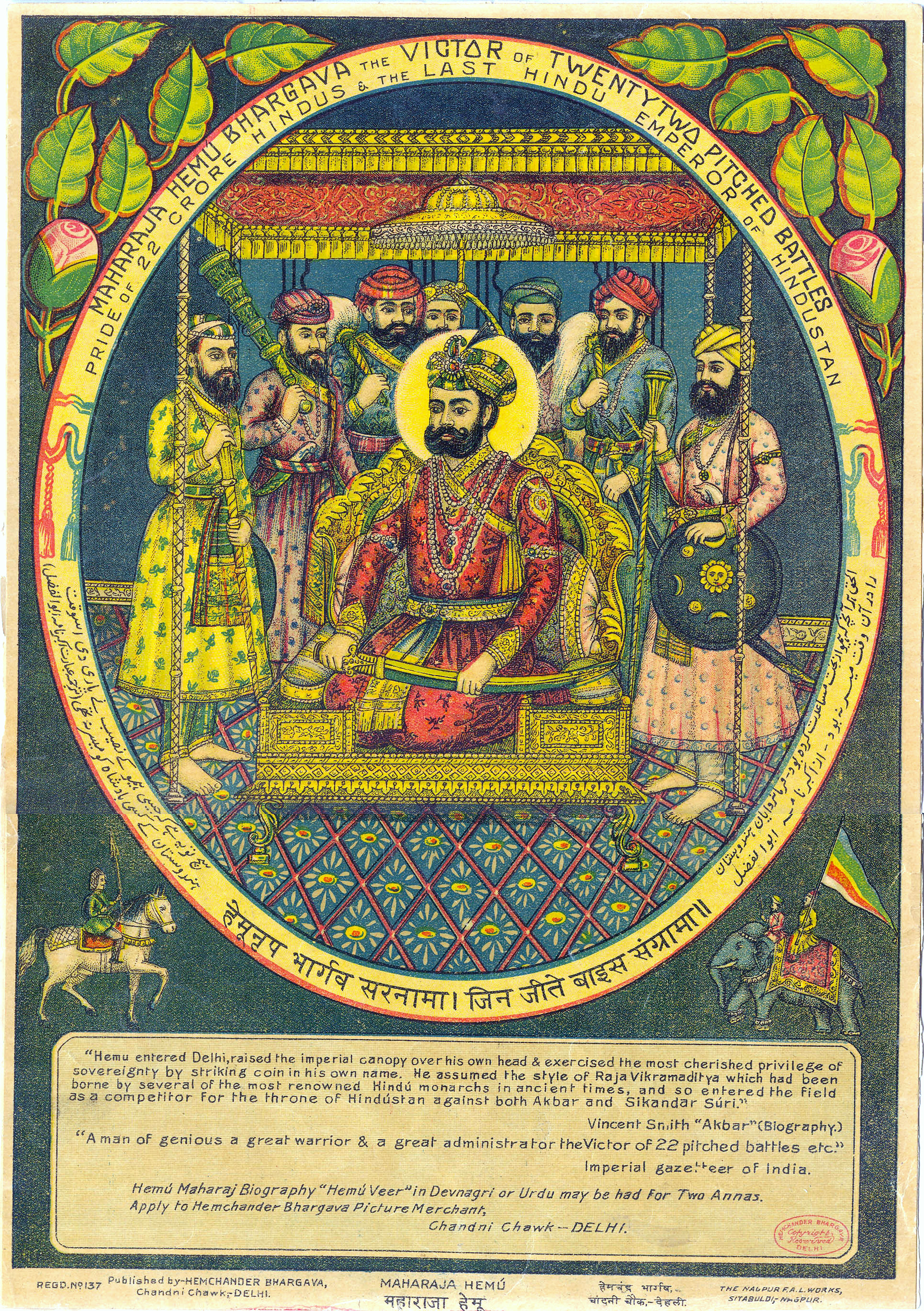
Hemchandra (Hemu) Vikramaditya in a poster of a c. 1910s book on him

Hem Chandra Vikramaditya Also known as Hemu was educated and brought up in what is now Rewari. Hem Chandra had developed a cannon foundry in Rewari, laying the foundation of a metalwork industry in brass, copper sheets. He had supplied cannons and gunpowder to Sher Shah Suri from 1535 onwards and was an adviser to the last ruler of Sur dynasty until 1553, Adil Shah Suri, when he became Prime Minister and Chief of Army. Hem Chandra had won 22 battles from Punjab to Delhi during 1553–56. He defeated Mughal king Akbar's forces at Agra and Delhi. Hem Chandra was crowned as a Vikramaditya king at Purana Quila in Delhi on 7 October 1556, reigned as king of Delhi for one month but lost to Akbar on 5 November 1556 at Panipat where he died. His haveli (house) still stands in the Qutubpur area of Rewari, which in his day was a village in its own right. His two-story haveli, with carved sandstone doorway, is made of local stone from Aravalli range, brunt-mud lakhori bricks and lime mortar. Walls are plastered with lime and painted with limewash. Roof has lakhouri bricks and stone slabs rested on timer beams. Doors and niches have stone lintels or brick arches in the local regional architecture. Over-hanging roof chhajja has stone brackets to anchor the stones.

Akbar made Rewari a sarkar under Delhi Suba. Aurangzeb attacked and recovered it from the rebels. Mughals granted the local rule to Rao Nand Ram, a leader of Bolni village in 17th century which lasted up to 19th century. A small principality was established there in the early century and ruled over the surrounding Ahirwal area.

=== Rao Balkishan ===
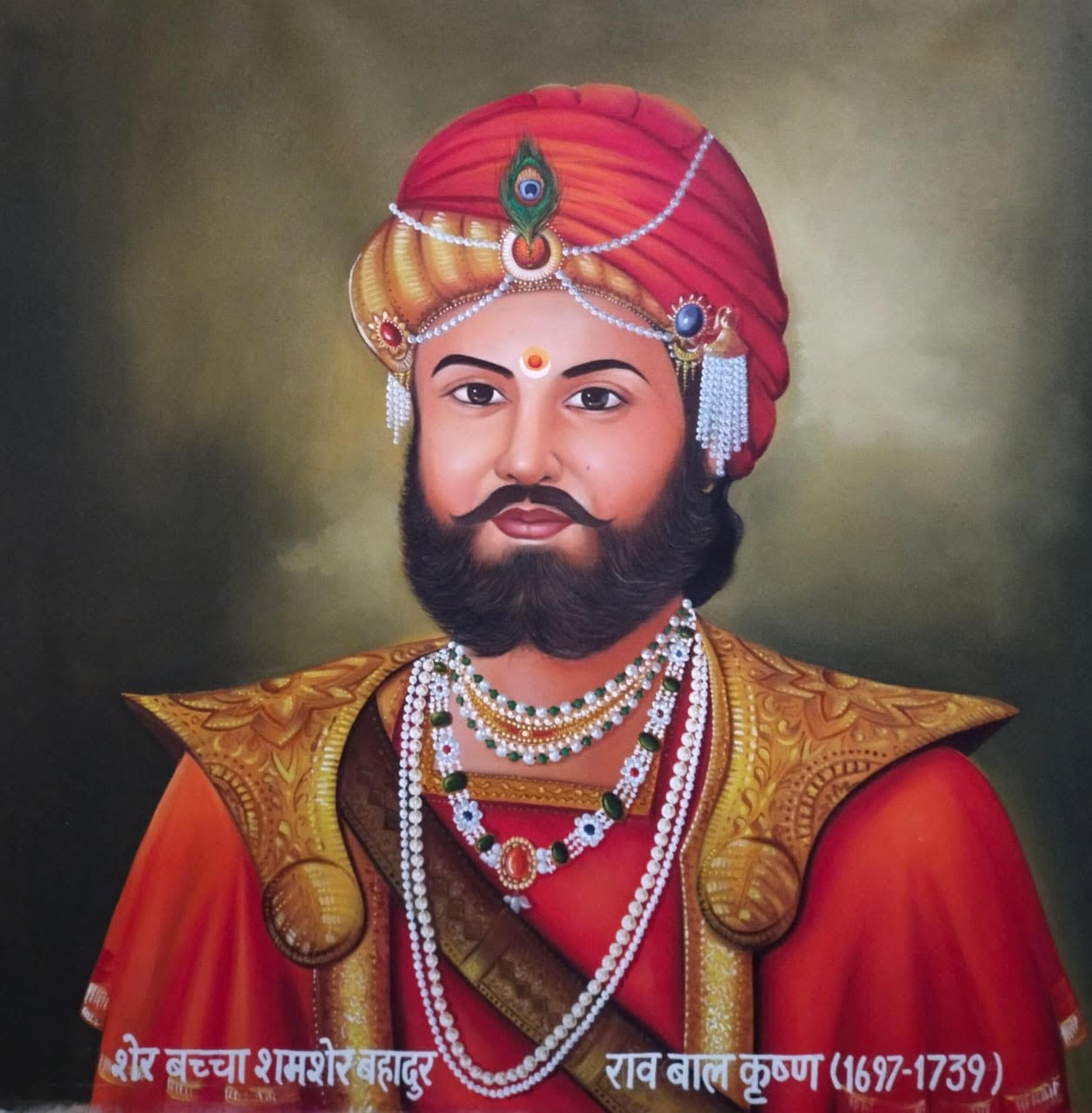
Rao Bal kishan

In 1739, the Iranian ruler Nader Shah attacked India. Rao Bal Kishan, with his army of 5,000 infantry and 2,000 cavalry and with the forces of Delhi, fought Nader Shah. Nadir Shah himself acknowledged Rao Balkishan's bravery, moving the emperor to posthumously honor him.

=== Rao Gujarmal ===
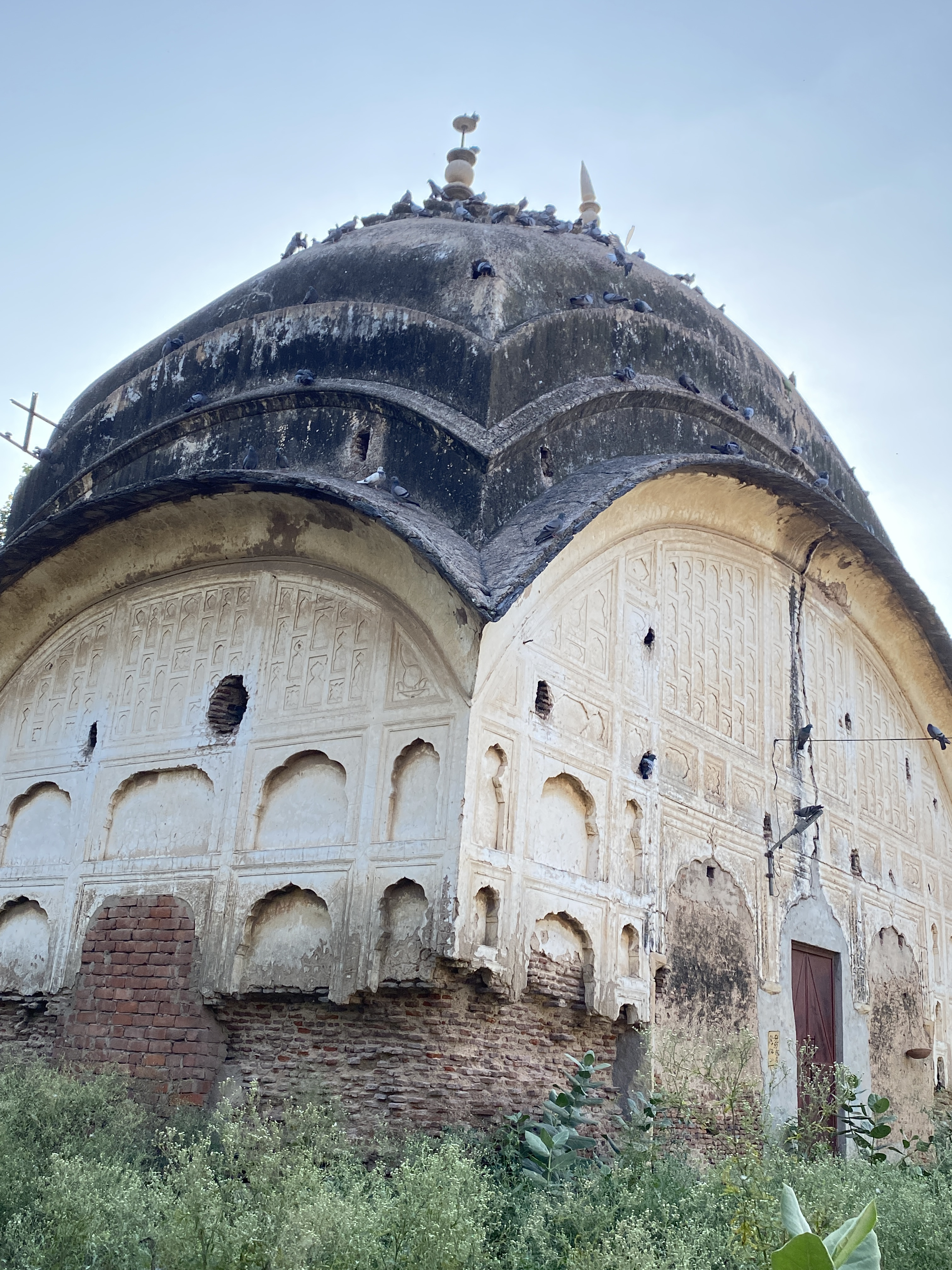
Rao Gujarmal Chhatri(Memorial) At Rewari.

After Rao Balkishan, His Brother Rao Gujarmal became the king of Rewari riyasat, He Fought Against Baloch, And Remove Baloch rule from Haryana. Under his rule the Rewari State Achieve its peak. At its peak, the kingdom included Rewari, Jhajjar, Dadri, Bhiwani, Hansi, Hissar, Kanaud (Mahendragarh). The Kingdom's boundaries stretched from Karnal in the north to Ferozepur Jhirka in the south, Delhi in the east and Singhana in the west.

=== Rao Mitrasen ===
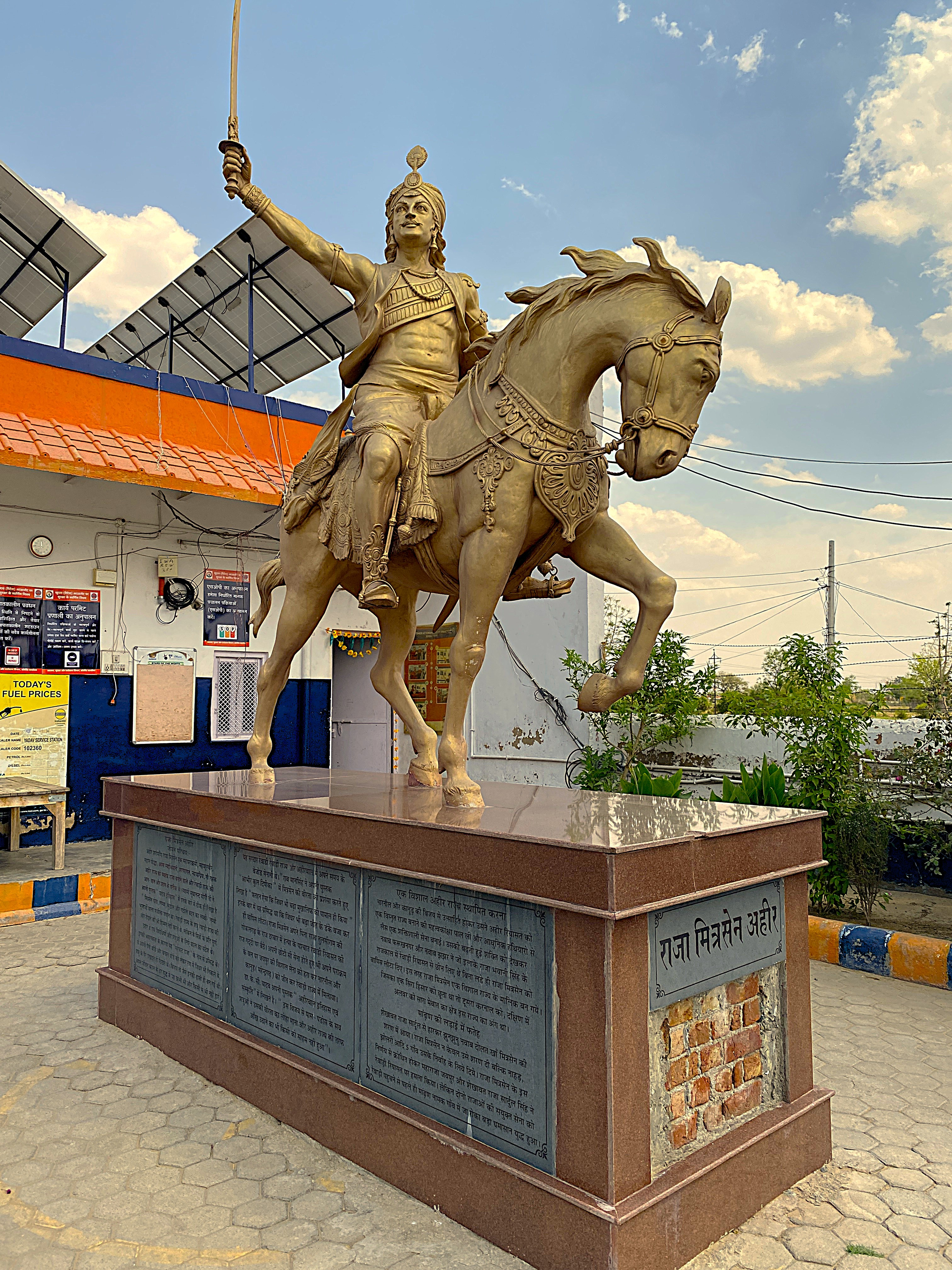
Rao Mitrasen

Rao Mitrasen was Commander Of Rewari, Who fought and saved Rewari from Rajputs And Marathas.

=== Rao Tula Ram ===
Rao Tula Ram along with Rao Gopal Dev fought against the British in Indian Rebellion of 1857 in 1857 and lost. East India Company confiscated his principality and took control of Rewari. The British made Rewari a part of Gurgaon district of Punjab province.

The Rewari royal family played an important role in representing the interests of Rewari soldiers in the army during the British period.

It remained a part of Gurgaon district until reorganisation in 1972 saw it transferred to Mahendragarh district. Further changes in 1989 led to the creation of the eponymous Rewari district.

==== Rezang La battle of 1962 ====
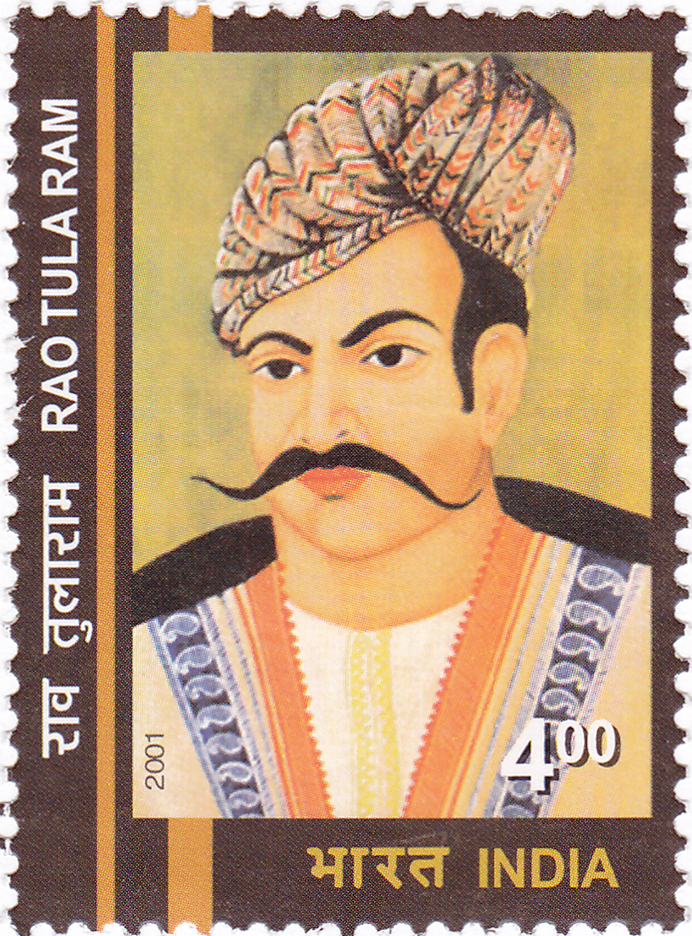
Rao Tula Ram

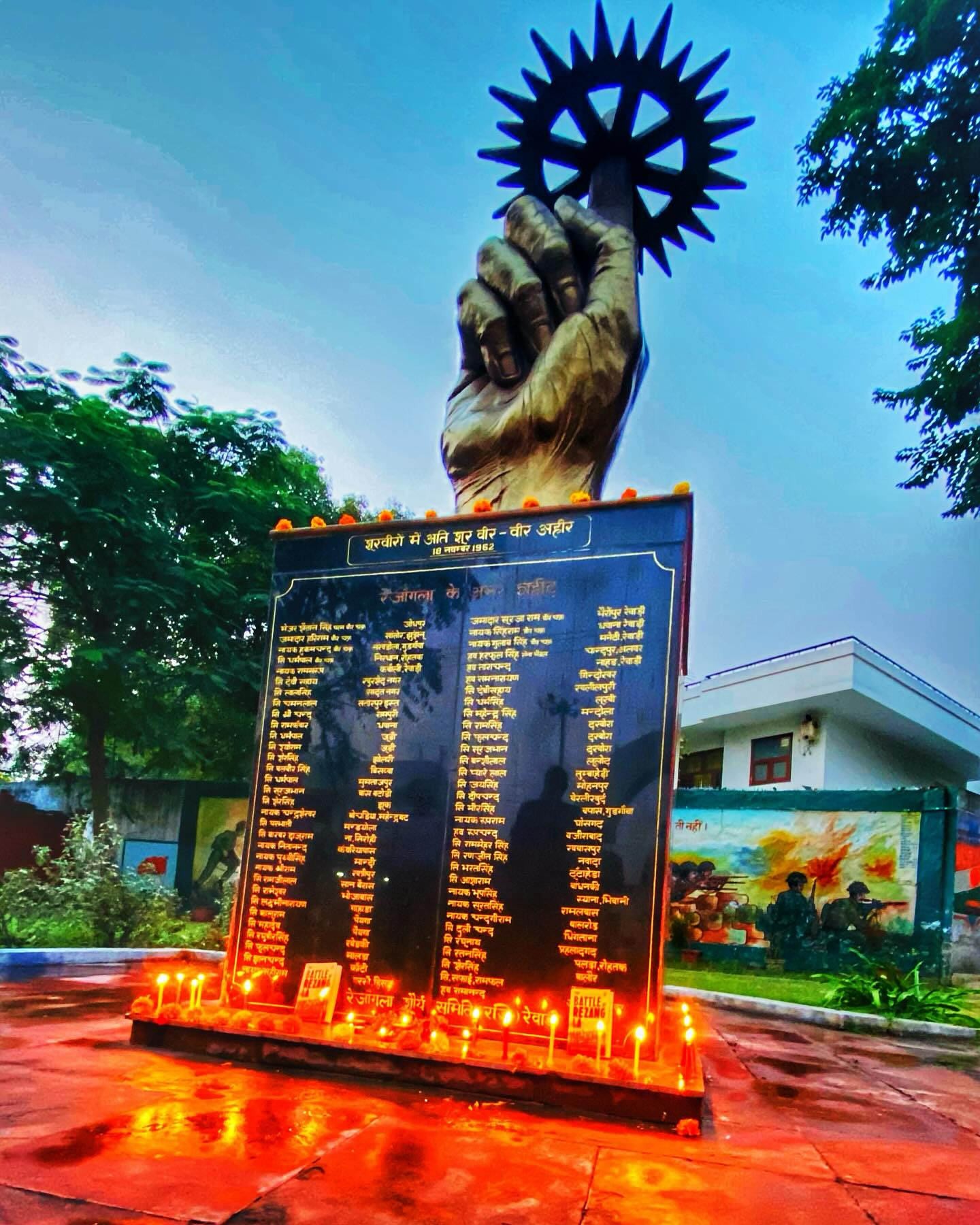
Rezang La memorial

Rewari is well known for the high proportion of soldiers and officers it contributes to the Indian army and other armed forces of India. Rezang La near Chushul in Ladakh was the site of the last stand of C Company of the 13 Kumaon battalion, during the Sino-Indian War on 18 November 1962. The C Company was composed almost entirely of Rewaris (Natives from Rewari region) and was led by Major Shaitan Singh, who won a posthumous Param Vir Chakra for his actions. In Indian Military History this war is unimaginable as 1 PVC, 1MVC, 8VrC AND 4 Sena Medals won by this company. Capt Ram Chander and Hav Nihal Singh, SM still living like legends.

In this action 120 men of the C Company fought until their bullets finished and then fought hand-to-hand. Of the 120 men, 114 died and only six seriously injured men remained alive. Of these, five were captured POW and only one came down to inform others. A memorial was constructed in Rewari city for them. The soul-stirring inscription on the War Memorial at Chushul, Ladakh raised by Indian Army in the memory of the fallen brave soldiers in the Battle of Rezang La reads:

How can a man die better,

Than facing fearful odds,
For the ashes of his fathers,

And temples of his gods.

This inscription also appears on the Rezang La Memorial at Rewari.

== Geography ==
=== Location ===
Rewari is adjacent to Rajasthan and, therefore, has dust storms in summer. Rugged hilly terrain of Aravali ranges as well as sandy dunes in the district affect the city's climate. Rewari forms a part of the National Capital Region.

Rewari is located at 28.18°N 76.62°E. It has an average elevation of 245 metres (803 feet). Rewari is 88 km away from Delhi.

=== Climate ===
The mean minimum and maximum temperature range from 0 °C to 46 °C during January (winter) and May–June (summer) respectively. The summer temperature can go up to 46 °C from May to July. Winter is from November to February and the temperature can fall to 2 °C in December and January. The temperature was recorded as 0 °C on 12 January 2012 and 31 January 2012 and below zero (−0.5 °C) on 4 January 2018.

Rain falls from July to September. A little rain is experienced during winter also. Average annual rainfall in Rewari city is 553 millimetres (21.8 in).

== Demographics ==
As of 2011, Rewari city had a population of 143,021 (compared to 100,946 in 2001 and 75,342 in 1991) showing 42% growth in 2001–11-decade against 34% growth in 1991–2001 decade. Males were 75,764 (53% of the population) and females were 67,257 (47%). The overall sex ratio (female:male) was 886 compared to national average 940, and in the 0 to 6-year age group was 785 compared to national average 918. Rewari had an average literacy rate of 78%, higher than the national average of 64.3% for entire population and 74.0% for population excluding 0 to 6-year age group in 2011. Male literacy was 83% and female literacy was 73% (compared to 79% and 67% respectively in 2001). In Rewari, 11.3% of the population was under six years of age.

The population of Rewari city was estimated at 163,000 in 2023.

Hindi and its dialects Ahirwati and Haryanvi are spoken in Rewari.

== Civic utilitities, amenities, and services ==
=== Healthcare ===
Rewari city has a civil hospital run by the civil administration. It has 50 beds and the capacity has been planned to increase to 100 beds. It also has a trauma centre for attending to accidents on highways. Indian Railways has a hospital with 20 beds near Rewari railway station.

=== AIIMS Rewari, Haryana ===
The All India Institute of Medical Sciences, Rewari (AIIMS Rewari) is the first AIIMS in the state of Haryana. The institute is being developed in the semi-urban region of Majra–Bhalakhi, located near the Chitadoungra village road in Rewari district. The campus covers an area of approximately 210 acres (85 hectares).

AIIMS Rewari is planned to have a capacity of around 750 beds. Like other AIIMS institutions across India, admission to the MBBS programme will be conducted through the NEET (UG) examination. The institute will offer 100 undergraduate (MBBS) seats and 60 seats in the B.Sc. (Nursing) programme.

The project is expected to significantly strengthen advanced healthcare services and medical education in southern Haryana and adjoining regions.

== Economy ==
=== Rewari metal work ===
Rewari is famous for its traditional metalwork, particularly Brass work. The brass industry began around 1535, with the help of the Portuguese. During the time of Hemu, cannons were cast in Rewari for the army of Sher Shah Suri.

== Attractions ==
=== Rewari Heritage Steam Locomotive Museum ===
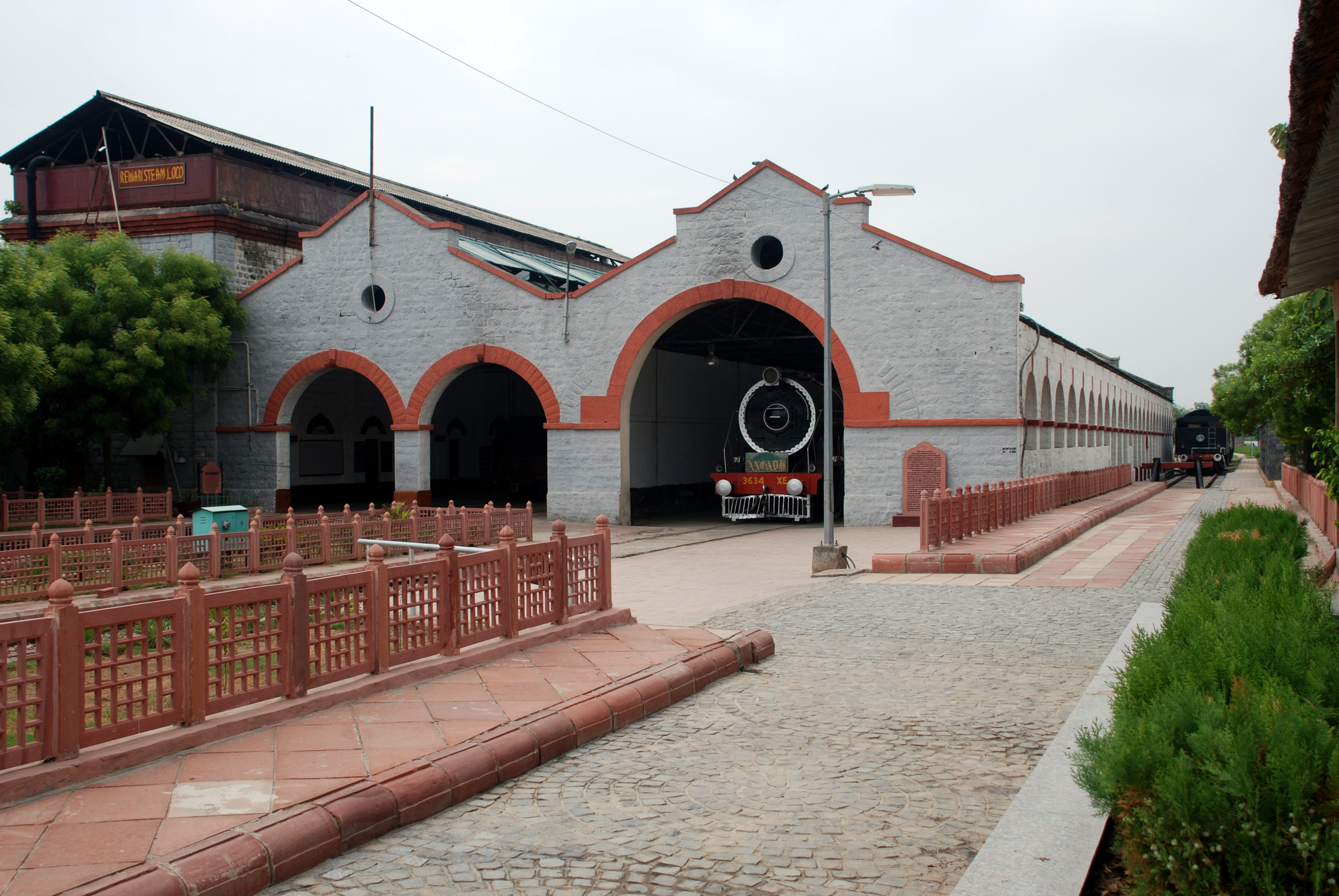
Rewari Railway Heritage Museum

Rewari Heritage Steam Locomotive Museum is the only surviving steam loco shed in India and houses some of India's last surviving steam locomotives. Built in 1893, it was the only loco shed in North India for a long time and a part of the track connecting Delhi with Peshawar. After steam engines were phased out by 1990, the loco shed remained in neglect for many years before it was decided by Indian Railways in December 2002 to revive it as a heritage . museum. The shed was refurbished as a heritage tourism destination, its heritage edifice was restored and a museum exhibiting Victorian-era artefacts used on the Indian rail network, along with the old signalling system, gramophones and seats was added. The refurbished heritage museum was opened in October 2010. The engines are also available for live demonstrations.

=== Tej Sarovar(Bada Talab) ===
Tej Sarovar, also known as Rao Tej Singh Talab or Bada Talab, is a historical pond located in Rewari, Haryana. It was built by Rao Tej Singh in 1801 At cost of Rs 1,35,000. There is also a Famous Hanuman temple near the talab made by rao tej singh.The pond is a significant part of the local history and culture, particularly within the Ahirwal region.

=== Shri Dayanand Gaushala (World's First Gaushala) ===
Shri Dayanand Gaushala, Rewari is the oldest gaushala of world and established in 1879 by Rao Yudhishter Singh S/o legendary Freedom Fighter and King of Rewari Rao Tularam. The Gaushala was established on the appeal of Maharshi Dayanand Saraswati. The Gaushala is located near the Nand Sarovar(Rao Nandram Sarovar).

=== Solahrahi Talab ===
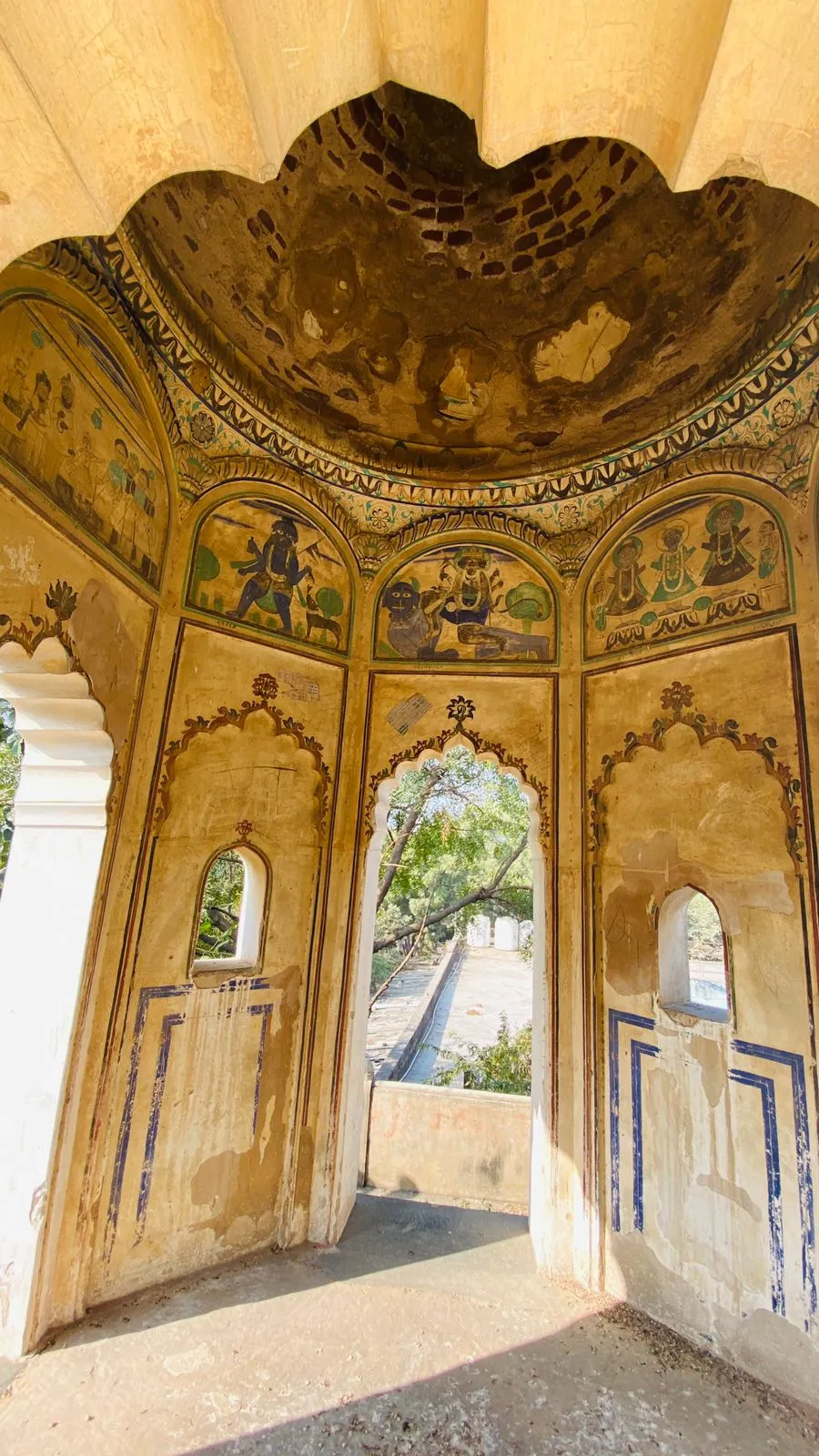
Chattri At Solahrahi Talab.

Solahrahi Talab, a stepwell, was Made by Rao Gujarmal of Rewari. This Talab consist 16 ways that's why it is named Solahrahi Talab. Now Govt. Of Haryana Conserved the Talab.

=== Meerpur Haveli ===
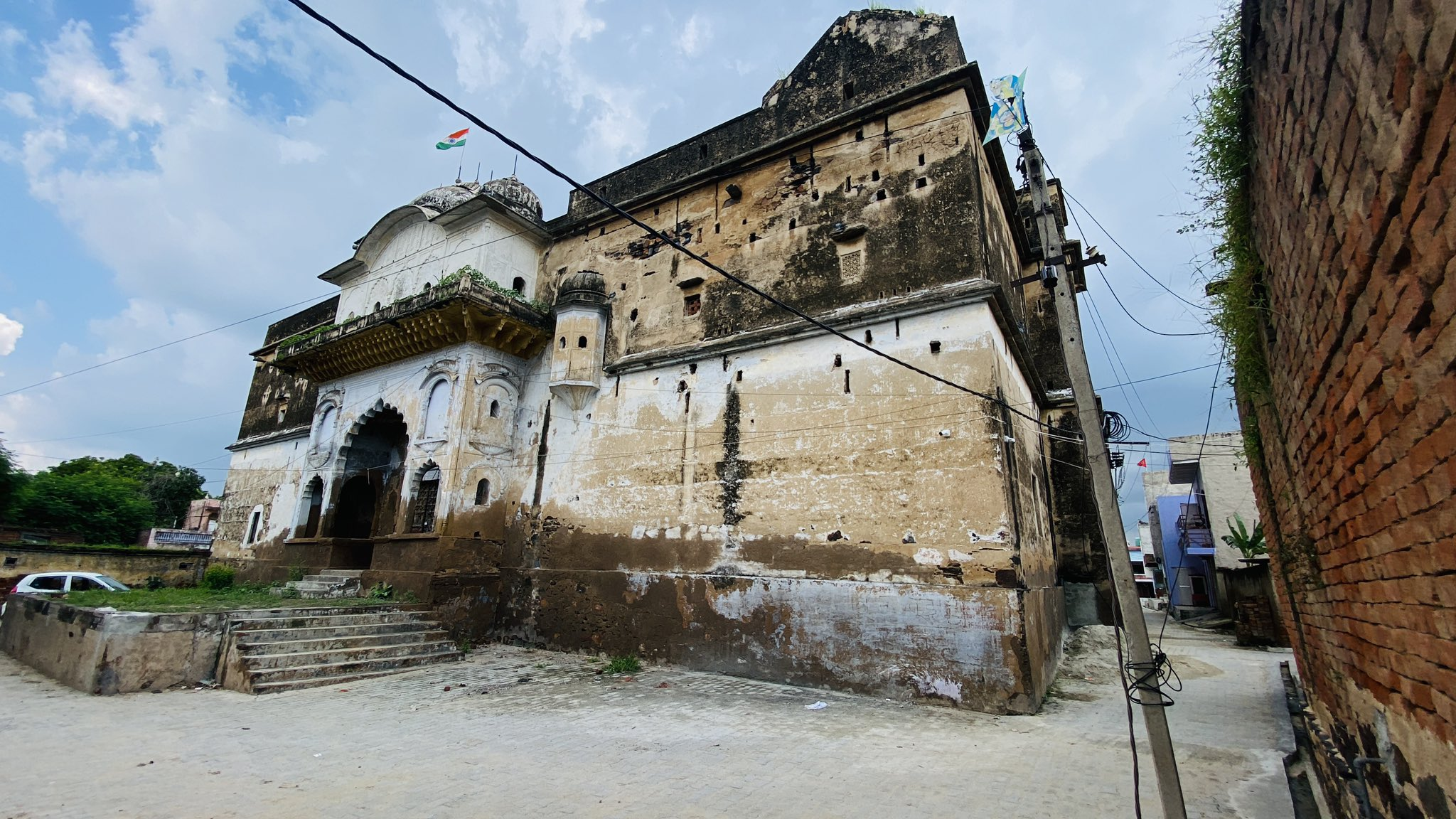
Meerpur Haveli View From Outside

The Meerpur Haveli also known as Tej Singh Haveli, is one of the Huge and beautiful Haveli of Haryana constructed by the King Of Rewari Rao Tej Singh In 18th century.This beautiful Haveli is still in good condition.

=== Rani ki Dyodhi ===
Rani Ki Dyodhi Is a 500 Years Old Magnificent Havel mainly built for the Queen's of royal family of rewari. Built in 1675 by King Rao nand ram.This Haveli is made in Rajasthani Style. This beautiful historic structure was spread in 25 acres before the revolt of 1857. Kings of rewari revolted against Britishers under the leadership of rao gopal dev . The Britishers destroyed most of the structure with canon.

The remaining structure is reconstructed by the scions of the family and mainly by Rao bijender singh yadav.

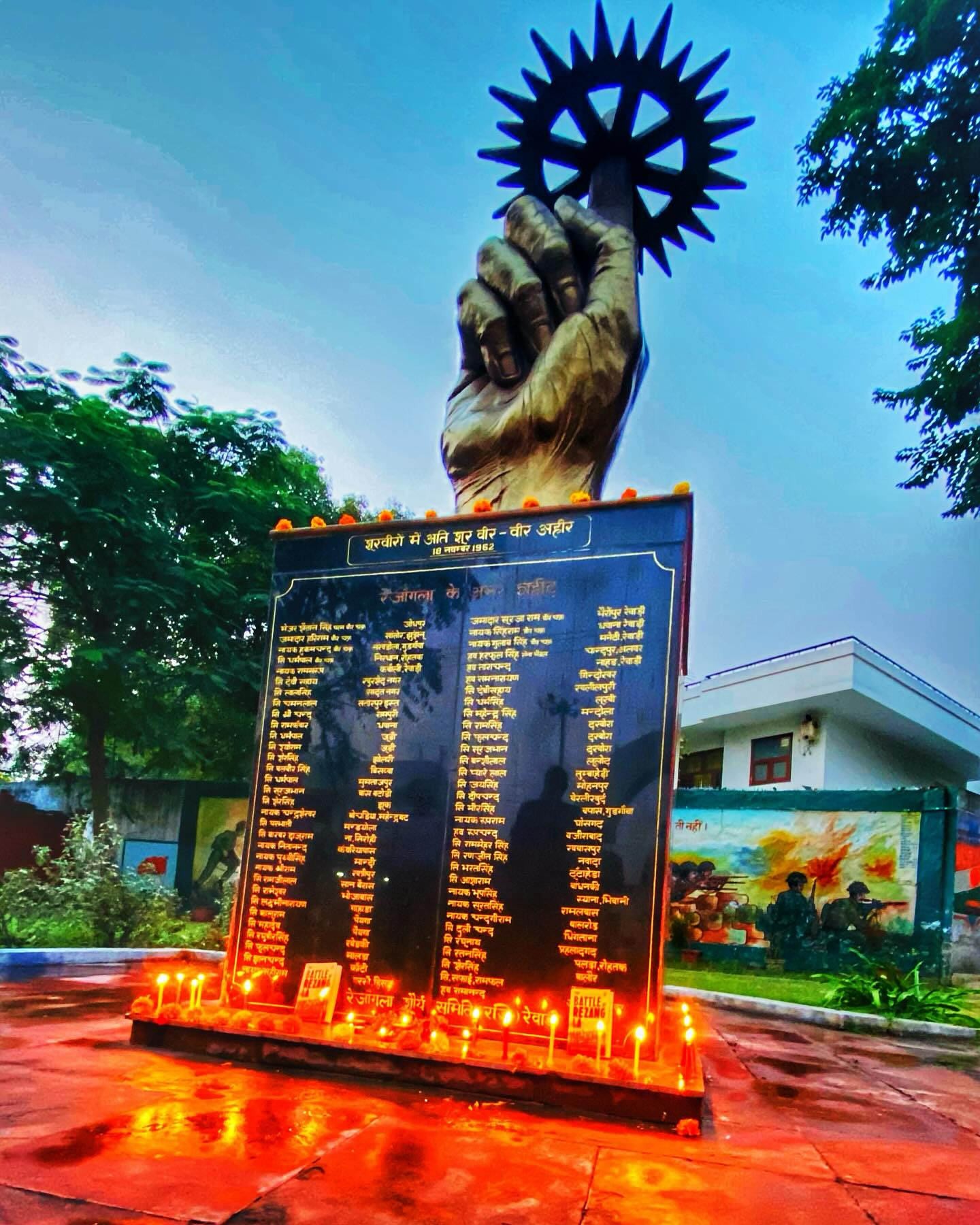
Rezang La Memorial

=== Rezang la War Memorial ===
The Rezang la War Memorial located at Gandhi Nagar, Rewari, constructed by the Rezangla Shaurya Samiti in the Remembrance of 120 martyrs (mainly from Rewari) who fought the and won the Battle of rezang la against 3000-5000 Chinese troops.

== Transport ==
=== By air ===
The nearest airport for all domestic and international flights is Indira Gandhi International Airport at Palam, New Delhi, 75 km away by road and 65 km away by train.

=== By rail ===
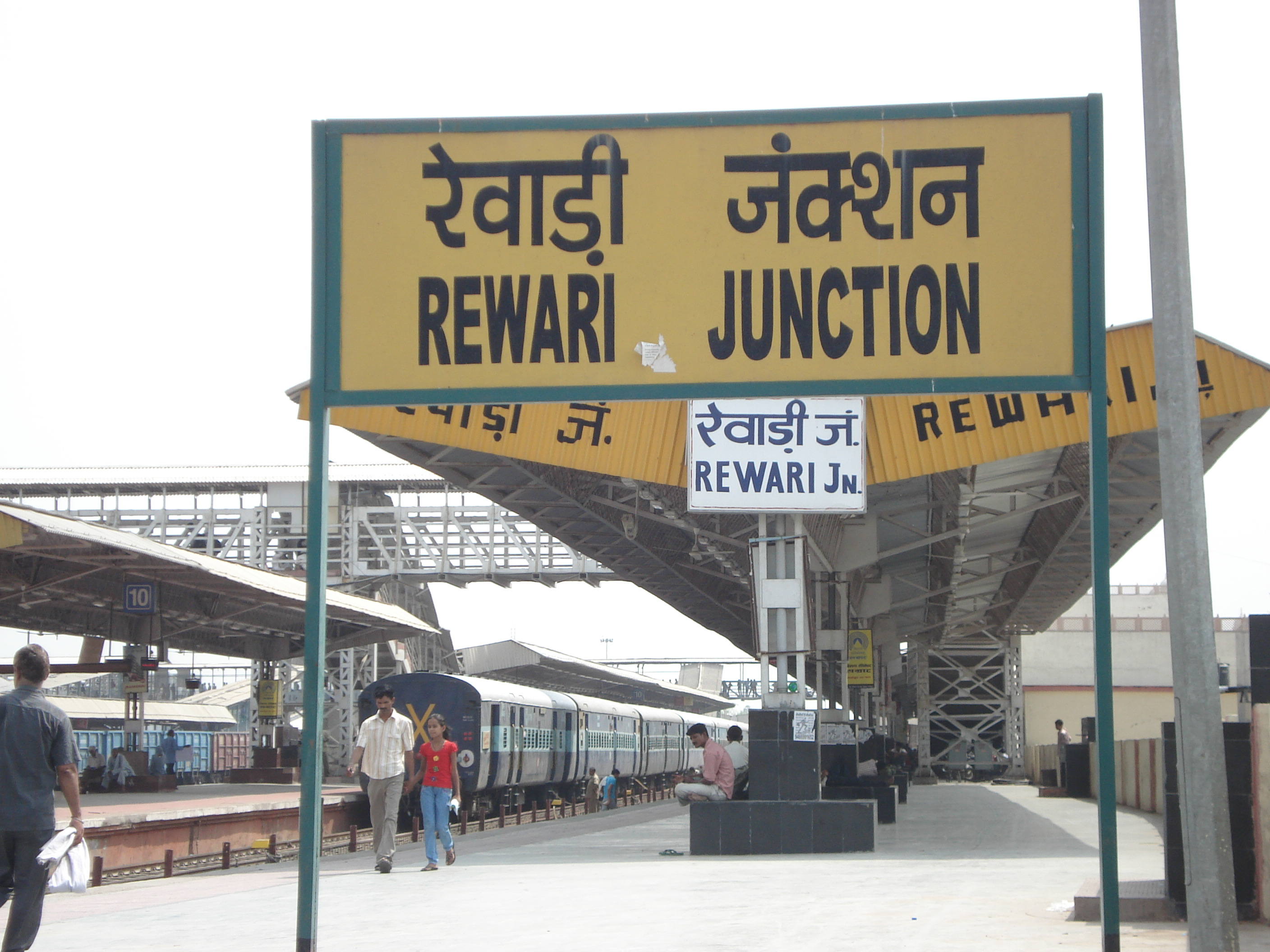
Rewari Railway Station

Rewari was first connected by a railway line in 1873 when the first metre gauge railway track in India became operational. This track was laid between Delhi and Ajmer. The gauge was converted to 5 ft 6 in (1,676 mm) broad gauge in 1995 for one of the tracks. This allowed metre gauge trains from Rajasthan to continue up to Delhi Sarai Rohilla station on the remaining track. The second track from Rewari to Delhi Sarai Rohilla station was converted to broad gauge in 2007 as all the metre gauge tracks from Rewari to cities in Rajasthan had been converted to broad gauge by then. Thus all the railway tracks from Rewari have been converted to broad gauge obviating the need for change of trains at gauge-change stations such as Delhi and Ahmedabad.

Rewari is a major junction on the Indian railway network and is connected to the major cities of India by direct trains.

A new railway line Rapid Regional Transit System (RRTS) is being constructed from Nizamuddin station in New Delhi to Alwar via Gurgaon-Manesar-Dharuhera-Rewari-Bawal-Shahjanpur. A loop of this RRTS was planned to have a railway station east of Rewari at village Majra Gurdas in an initial draft but not in the final route map.

=== By road ===
Rewari is connected by five national highways:

- NH 48 (former name NH 8 before renumbering of all national highways) (Delhi-Jaipur-Bombay-Pune-Bangalore).
- NH 11 (starting from NH 352 off Delhi-Jaipur NH 48 and going to Narnaul-Jhunjhunu-Bikaner-Jaisalmer).
- NH 352 (former name NH 71) (Rewari-Jhajjar-Rohtak-Jind-Narwana).
- NH 919 (former name NH 71B) (Rewari-Dharuhera-Sohna-Palwal).
- NH 352W (former name SH-26) (Rewari-Pataudi-Gurgaon).

State highways connect Rewari to all major towns in Haryana and adjacent districts of Rajasthan.

- SH-24 Rewari-Kanina-Mahendragarh-Loharu 92 km. (It may be converted to NH and become a part of Rewari-Kanina-Mahendragarh-Tosham-Hisar.)
- SH-15 Shahjahanpur-Rewari 21 km 4-lane with a bridge on the railway track at Rewari Anaj Mandi.
- SH-26) Gurgaon-Pataudi-Rewari 52 km.

The two-lane SH-26 was declared a national highway, NH352W, in 2018 and has been widened to four-lane to provide an alternative to NH 48. It will be ready in early 2026. The new alignment of NH 352W will join Dwarka Expressway (NH 248-BB) and provide fast connectivity of just one hour duration from Rewari to Palam airport and Delhi bypassing congested NH 48 in Gurgaon.

== Education ==
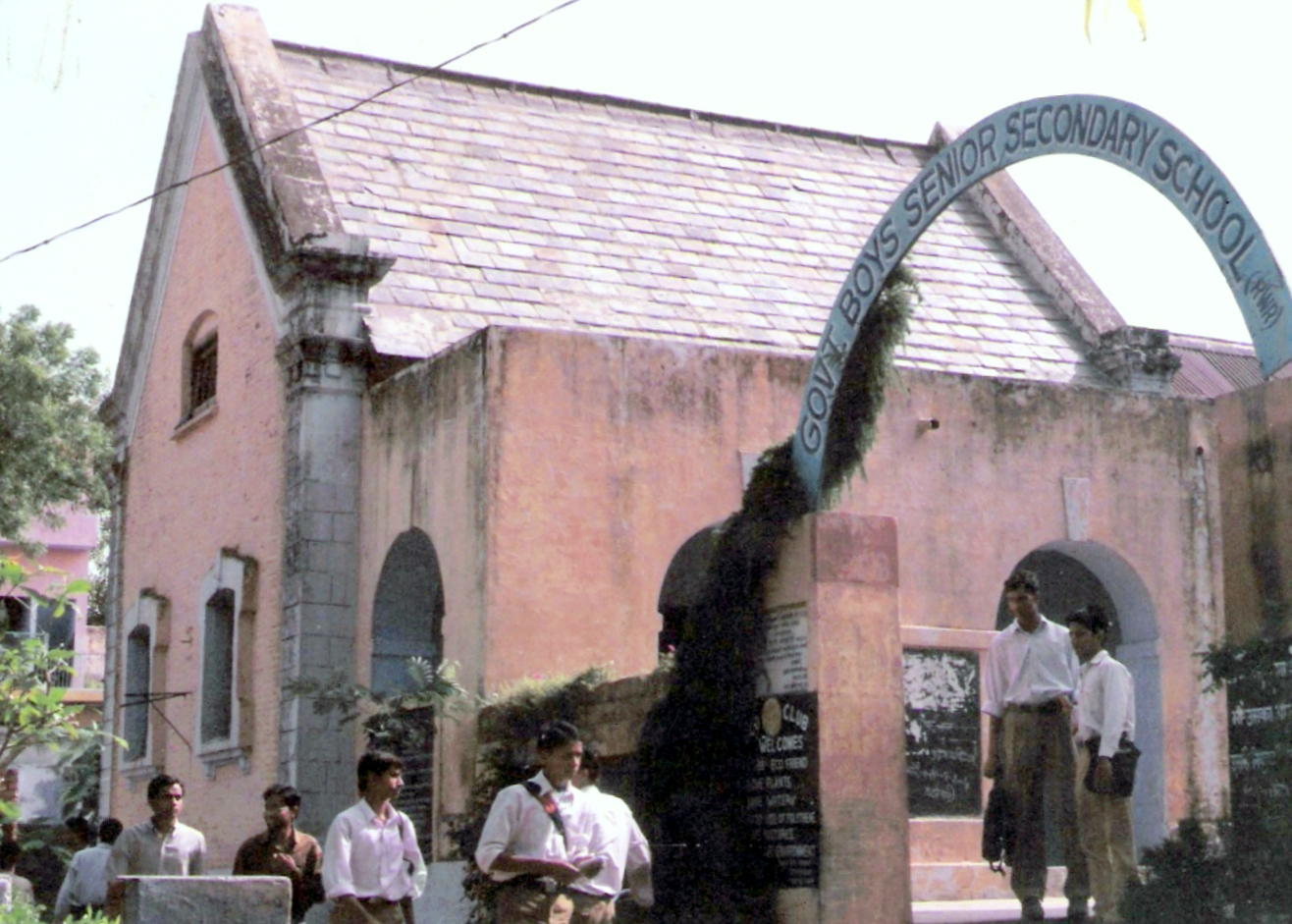
Govt. School for Boys, Rewari, established in 1890, one of the oldest schools in Haryana

A Kendriya Vidyalaya (Central School) has existed in Rewari city since 1980. A Sainik School was started in 2008, temporarily housed in Rewari city awaiting completion of construction of its permanent campus at village Gothra Tappa Khori, about 15 km southwest Rewari-Narnaul Road.

The Meerpur centre of Rohtak University was upgraded to a university in 2013. It is a state university.

Several private colleges have been set up around Rewari in the last decade, such as Mata Raj Kaur Institute of Engineering & Technology, to teach engineering, management, law, and nursing.

== Notable people ==
- Hem Chandra Vikramaditya, claimed the throne of Delhi, defeating the Mughal army of Akbar in 1556
- Rao Tula Ram, leader of the Indian Rebellion of 1857
- Rao Gopal Dev, leader of the Indian Rebellion of 1857
- Rao Birender Singh, former Chief Minister of Haryana
- Dr. B. K. Rao, first recipient of Padma Bhushan award in Rewari
- Commodore Babru Bhan Yadav, MVC, led the Operation Trident against Pakistan in Indo-Pakistan war 1971
- Santosh Yadav, first female mountaineer in India to climb Mount Everest twice
- Yogendra Yadav, an Indian activist, psephologist and politician
- Alhar Bikaneri, Indian Hindi-Urdu poet
- Chiman Singh, petty officer, MVC

== See also ==
- Neemrana
