= Cochin Sikhs =

Sikh community of Kochi, Kerala

Kochi is home to the Punjabi-speaking Sikh community in Kerala, as the coastal city has the most Sikhs in the south Indian state. The only gurdwara in Kerala is also located in Kochi. Every Sunday and Wednesday, the Sikh families of Kochi assemble at the gurdwara in the city. And after the prayers, they take food from the Guru Ka Langar, the community kitchen.

== See also ==
- Punjabi people
- Sikhism in India
