= Mundru =

Lisariya
- village
- Rajasthan, India Lisariya (India)
- Coordinates: 27.401356°N 75.689192°E
- Country: India
- State: Rajasthan
- District: Sikar

Area
  - Total: 137 km^{2} (53 sq mi)
- Elevation: 486 m (1,594 ft)

Population (2024)
  - Total: 15,000
  - Density: 110/km^{2} (280/sq mi)

Languages
  - Official: Hindi
- Time zone: UTC+5:30 (IST)
- PIN: 332712

lisariya is an old historical village in Sri Madhopur tehsil of Sikar district of Rajasthan, India.

== History ==
It was the capital of an estate of the same name founded in 17th century by Raja Hridayram (1618–44), son of Raja Hariram of Khandela (1614-1618). a son of Raja Raisal, the ruler of Udaipurvati (Kausambhi), Kasli, Rewasa (Khachariawas) and Khandela (also called Khandila, Khandelapura, Khandelgiri) (1549–1614), Premiere Courtier of Mughal Empire, and his wife, Rajkumari Kisnavati, the only daughter of Chauhan Raja Peetha Nirban of Khandela.

While Raja Raisal was in the Deccan (Burhanpur), Madho Singh Ladkhani and other grandsons of his, out of boldness and evil intentions, collected a number of vagabonds and forcibly took possession of their grandfather's property, which was called Khandela and was near Amber. Its Dewan, Mathura Das Bengali, who was upright and learned, and held charge of the Raja's establishment, and was acting as the Raja's deputy at the Court behaved with prudence, and rescued part of the property from the hands of the usurpers. His sons Raja Hariram, Raja Bhojraj and Rao Tirmal had got titles and Mansab during the lifetime of their father, while younger son Raja Girdhar who behaved loyally to the Emperor received the title of Raja after Raisal's death.

It was the head seat of Hariramot Shekhawat dynasty whose other descendants established themselves at smaller fiefs or jagirs in nearby villages including Lisaria or Lasada, Abhawas, Kolwa, Bhomias, Bagariawas and Dhalyawas or Dhaliawas. Some of the jagirs of this clan were captured by collateral branches of Rajawats of Jaipur, Girdharji Ka Shekhawats of Khandela and Raoji Ka Shekhawats. Dadia and Jethi tracts slipped out of their control on being usurped by Girdharji Ka Shekhawats. Rao Daulat Singh of Sikar along with Rao Fateh Singh of Dujod and Rao Deep Singh of Kasli (great grandsons of Rao Tirmal), ousted a branch of the family of Hari Ramji Ka Shekhawats and took possession of Jagmalpura estate along with Chainpura and Dadi in late 17th Century. Rajkumari Sone Kanwar, Princess of Mundru, granddaughter of Hariramji was married to the heroic Thakur Sahibkhanji Champawat. While his daughter was married to Prince Bharmal of Kishangarh and gave birth to Maharaja Roop Singh who was killed by Aurangzeb in the battle of Samugarh (Dharmat).

== Etymology ==
The word Mundru (मुंडरू) is derived from Mudrika (मुद्रिका) or Mundri (मुंदरी) meaning 'a ring' as it was surrounded by a lake and has a gem like mountain made of a single stone.

== Fort Mundru Garh ==
Mundru village was initially a jungle surrounded by two rivers and a large pond and a gem-like fortress on a single rock hillock, over which they constructed a grand fort and a temple of 'Balaji' their family deity Lord Hanuman. The estate had over 52,000 acre land, and they had occupied territory up to Mehrauli. It is site of a dilapidated fort and various historical temples.

After being ousted from Khandela, grandsons of Princess Kisnavati of Khandela established themselves at Ranoli Fort, which was also usurped soon, and finally at village Mundru, in 1621 AD, at the heart of which is the fortress of Mundru Garh, the Balaji Dungari, built on a gem-like mountain made of a single rock surrounded by a round lake formed by two rivers - that lord Rama Chandra of Ayodhya, ancestor of the family, is said to have visited and marked his footsteps, it houses the ancient temple of lord Hanuman - the family deity: Monkey god, with the ancient custom of establishing a Hanuman temple before setting up any establishment in the territory. As the legend goes, a saint was making soup when he got angry and threw the Chatu (spoon) at village Khatu, Handi (bowl) at Mundru and the Dhakani (cover) nearby, hence this structure came into being in between two rivers, hence the name Mundari or Mudrika meaning ring shaped in Sanskrit.

== Economy ==
The majority of the population is involved in agricultural and trade activities. The region is very rich in phosphorus and other minerals with abundant ground water although the seasonal river Mendha has dried up. There are various orchards of Mangoes.

Schools, institutes, banks, and non-governmental organizations are actively spreading in this region. The close proximity to the state capital Jaipur, which is less than two hours road drive, the well connected roads linking via Highway from Jaipur to Delhi, the availability of potable water, and fertile soil have added advantages. The river now flows only during rainy season and the water level is going down rapidly.

== Temples and festivals ==
Mundru has around 16 temples, of which some have historical importance. In the month of Vaishak (spring) there is Narsingh Leela festival in the town, in which everyone participates. In the jhanki (tableau), all the 24 incarnations (avatars) of Lord are presented, depicting the different stages of Lord's life. Jhankis are the miniature representation of a village made of clay where the humans are represented by dolls dressed up as kids, men and women with traditional dresses like lehangas, chunnis, dhotis and kurtas. The most common jhankis on the festivals are the following: Palki (cradle), Lord Hanuman, Lord Brahma, Narad Muni, Lord Indra's rath and Lord Narsingh. Some of the temples are of Mundru are:

- Shri Khalda Balaji Mandir
- Doongari ka Balaji Mandir, on the single-rock mountain.
- Shyaam Mandir
- Bihaari Ji Mandir
- Jaanki Nath Ji Mandir
- Gopal Ji Mandir
- Jaalpaali Mandir
- Narsingh Ji Mandir
- Dabar ka balaji Mandir
- Sitaram Ji Mandir
- Ram Dev ji Mandir
- Radha Krishna Mandir
- Nirban rani sa (Sati mata) ka mandir
- Khadali wala balaji ka mandir

== Location ==
Mundru is an old village in Sri Madhopur Mandal, Neem ka thana district of Rajasthan State. It is located approximately 10 km from Sri Madhopur city, and approximately 57 km from Sikar. It is 55 km from Jaipur. Nearby villages are Kolwa(1 km), Khurampura (3 km) Phootala (3 km), Lisariya (3.7 km), Mau (5.7 km), Anatpura (5.9 km), Nathoosar (3.1 km). Nearest towns are Sri Madhopur (12 km), Reengus (13 km), Khatu shyamji (25 km), Khandela (27 km), Neem Ka Thana (38.3 km), Piprali (48 km), Abhawas, Ajeetgarh, Anatpura, Bagariyawas.

== Nearby educational institutes ==
- Government Primary School
- Sikar Balika Mahavidyalaya
- Sri Adarsh Mahila B.Ed. College
- Baba Narayan Das Mahila Shikshak Prashikshan Sansthan

== Demographics ==
The male population of Mundru was recorded to be 4,296 while the female population was recorded to be 4,106 according to 1990 census. The total population being 8,402. Most of the people have migrated to Jaipur and other cities, thereby resulting in a considerable downfall in the population density.

== General information ==
- Religion: 99% of population are Hindus
- Temperature: Max. 44 °C in June, Min. 1 °C in January
- Monsoon season: June to July

== See also ==
- Rao Shekha
