= National Highway 352W (India) =

National Highway in India

National Highway 352W
- Map of National Highway 352W in red

Route information
- Auxiliary route of NH 52
- Length: 43.2 km (26.8 mi)

Major junctions
- West end: NH 352 in Rewari
- NH 248BB in Harsaru
- East end: NH 48 in Gurgaon

Location
- Country: India
- States: Haryana

Highway system
- Roads in India; Expressways; National; State; Asian
← NH 352	→ NH 48

National Highway 352W (NH 352W) commonly referred to as Gurgaon-Pataudi Road is a national highway and a spur of Delhi–Jaipur Super Expressway(NH-352B) in India.

== History ==
It was a two-lane state highway, SH 26, in Haryana before it was decided to convert it into a 4-lane national highway in the year 2018 to provide an alternative NH to Delhi-Jaipur highway or National Highway 48, from Gurgaon to Rewari via Pataudi. Land acquisition took many years and the actual widening of the highway started only in the last quarter of 2021 and may complete by the end of 2023. The national highway will bypass Pataudi town.

It also connects Dwarka Expressway, NH 248-BB.

== Route and new alignment ==
SH 26 connected Rewari, Kakoria, Chillar, Maujabad, Pataudi, Jamalpur, Wazirpur, Harsaru and Gurgaon. It passed under the proposed Dwarka Expressway just after Harsaru and continued to Gurgaon.

Now 352W has a new alignment bypassing Wazirpur, Hyatpur and Harsaru. The new alignment takes off from end of sector 98, continues northwards between Wazipur village and the railway line north of Harsaru village and meets Dwarka Expressway between sectors 88A and 88B and goes under Dwarka Expressway. It ends there and does not continue to Gurgaon.

== See also ==
- List of national highways in India
- List of national highways in India by state
