= Rao Tula Ram =

Indian revolutionary

Rao Tularam
- Raja
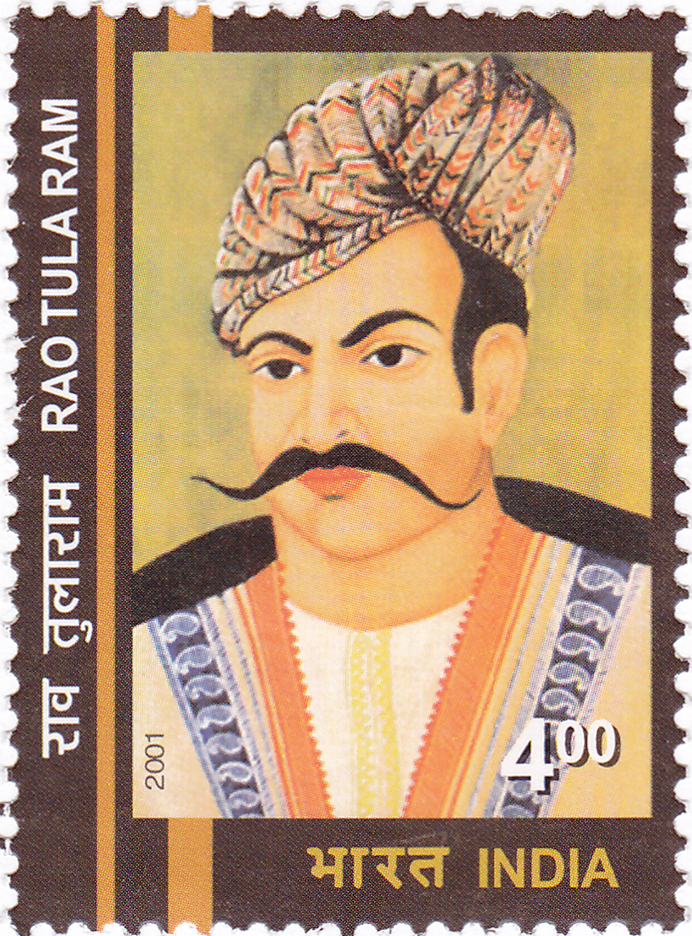
- Rao Tula Ram on a 2001 stamp of India
- Reign: 1838–1857
- Predecessor: Rao Puran Singh
- Successor: British Raj
- Born: circa 9 December 1825; Rampura, Rewari, Ahirwal, Punjab region
- Died: 23 September 1863 (aged 37); Kabul, Afghanistan
- Father: Rao Puran Singh
- Mother: Rani Gyan Kaur

Rao Tularam Singh (circa 9 December 1825 – 23 September 1863) was a King or chieftain of Rewari. He was one of the leaders of the Indian rebellion of 1857 in Haryana, where he is considered a state hero.

== Personal life ==
He was born on 9 December 1825 in Rampura suburb of Rewari in an Ahir family to Puran Singh and Gyan Kaur. He was young when his father died.

== Reign ==
=== Indian Rebellion of 1857 ===
==== Initial success ====
On 17 May 1857 he along with his cousin, Rao Gopal Dev, and four to five hundred followers, deposed the local tehsildar and occupied Rewari. He raised a force of about 5000 soldiers and set up a workshop for manufacturing the guns and other ammunition. Rao Tula Ram helped Emperor Bahadur Shah and other rebel forces who were waging war against British in Delhi. He sent Rs 45000/- through General Bakht Khan, ten days before the fall of Delhi and supplied large quantities of necessary commodities and supplied two thousand sacks of wheat.

==== The battle ====
Rao's forces, which were led by his cousin Rao Kirshan Singh, fought against the British on 16 November 1857 in the field of Nasibpur on outskirts of Narnaul. The first charge of Rao Tularam's forces was irresistible and the British forces scattered before them; several British officers were killed or wounded.

The British successfully retaliated and after the battle of Narnaul Rao Tularam moved in to Rajasthan and joined the force of Tantia Tope for one year but the forces of the Tantia Tope were defeated by British forces in the battle of Sikar in Rajasthan. After which Rao Tularam left India to seek help from the Shah of Iran (also see Anglo-Persian War from November 1856 to April 1857), Dost Mohammad Khan ruler of Emirate of Afghanistan (also see First Anglo-Afghan War from 1838 to 42) and Alexander II Emperor of All Russia against British colonial empire. Rao Tularam's estates were confiscated by the British in 1859, though proprietary rights of his two wives were retained. In 1877, his title was restored to his son Rao Yudhister Singh, who was made head of the Ahirwal area.

=== Death ===
On 23 September 1863, he died in Kabul in Afghanistan at the age of 38 due to an infection that spread throughout his body.

== Legacy ==
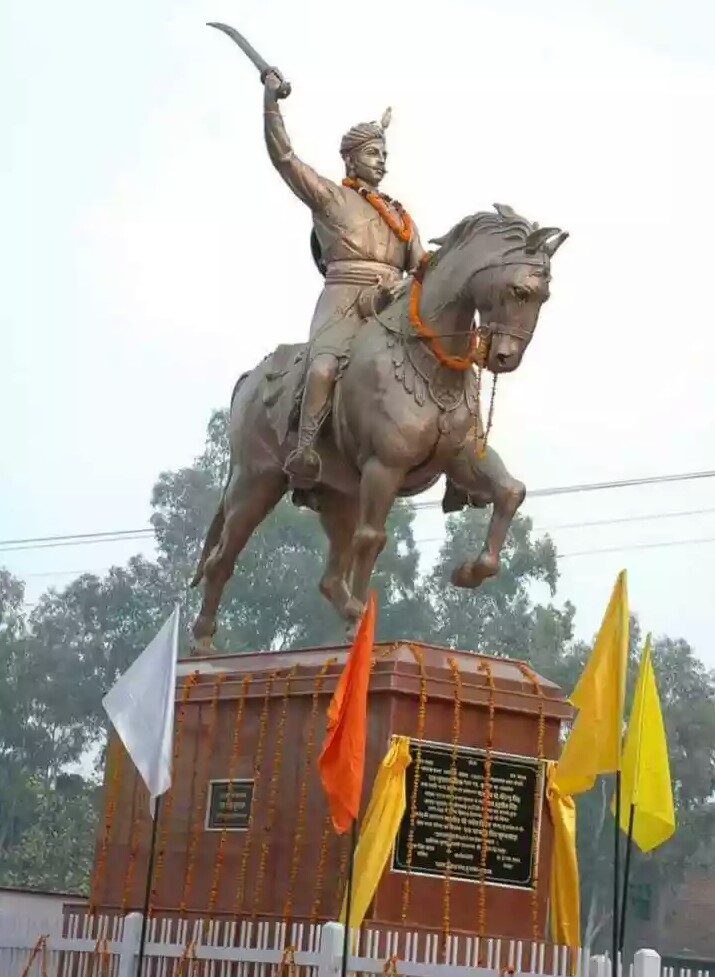
A statue of Rao Tularam in Jhajjar

The Government of India issued a postage stamp on 23 September 2001 featuring Rao Tularam.

=== Martyr's fair ===
A two-day Shahidi mela (martyr's fair) is held annually in September at Rampura suburb of Rewari city to commemorate the death anniversary of Rao Tularam.

== See also ==
- Rao Ruda Singh
