= Quni Daultabad =

Quni Daultabad (sometimes Daulatabad) is a Yadav dominated village in Pataudi Mandal, Gurgaon District, Haryana state, India.

Daulatabad is 27.23 km far from its Mandal Main Town Pataudi. Daulatabad is located 5.474 km distance from its District Main City Gurgaon. It is located 250 km distance from its State Main City Chandigarh.

Schools include GSSS PATAUDI, U S Senior Secondary School, New India Senior Socondary School, Indian sr.sec.school.
