= Rao Ruda Singh =

Rao Ruda (prakit for Rudra) Singh was an Ahir King and a scion of the family of Raos which have ruled over Rajasthan since the eighth century AD who cleared the jungle in Ahirwal in 1555 and founded new villages.

== See also ==
- Rao Tula Ram
