= Sikligar =

Indian community

The Sikligar (also known as Moyal) is a community found in the Indian states of Gujarat, Haryana, Rajasthan, and Punjab. By tradition, the Sikligar people specialized in the craft of making and polishing weapons. They are typically either Hindu or Sikhs in Punjab, Gujarat, Telangana, Madhya Pradesh, Delhi, Andhra Pradesh; and Haryana. In Andhra Pradesh, Jammu and Kashmir, Karnataka and Maharashtra, there are also Muslim Sikligars.

== Origin ==
The Arabic word saiqal means a polisher, and the Sikligar are those people who had the hereditary duty of making and maintaining weapons. Many administrators of the British Raj, such as H. A. Rose, Denzil Ibbetson and William Crooke wrote books that referred to the blacksmith communities as Lohars, although in fact that term refers to a specific group of people and is not interchangeable. They were once Lohars and thus blacksmiths but split from the Lohar community and became specialist bladesmiths.

They are a nomadic community, often with encampments at the edge of towns and cities. The Sikligar claim to have been Rajputs who fled from Islamic invading armies and subsequently became weapon polishers to disguise themselves from their foes. Their ancestral home is said to be the city of Kannauj, but they speak Gujarati. The community is strictly endogamous and is divided into twelve clans with equal status. These are the Kanthiwala Bhand, Mole Bhand, Gandhiwala Bhand, Jumarwala, Jilpatia, Pathlerde, Juni, Mat and Bardika clans.

According to their traditions, during the period of the Hindu deity Rama known as Haryana, there was a clan called the Chakreli. The Chakreli were the traditional manufacturers of swords and shields. The Chakreli lived in Chitor, in Rajasthan. Their ancestors fled their hometown in the face of invaders, and the ancestors of the Haryana Sikligar moved into the region in ancient times. Other traditions relate that the community is of Rajput origin. According to those stories, they were Rajput soldiers in the army of Prithvi Raj Chauhan, and became blacksmiths after his defeat at the hands of Mohammed Ghori.

In Punjab, the Sikligar claim to have migrated from Rajasthan, where they manufactured swords. The community converted to Sikhism after they settled in Punjab, and are now found throughout the area, especially in the districts of Bathinda, and Ludhiana. The Sikligar are now divided into a number of clans, the main ones being the Moyal, Tank, Junni, Dangi, Bhond, Bhori, Khichi, Thilipithiya, Dudani, Ghor-chare Tank, Kalyani and Churi te Biori.

The Sikligar first develop relations with Sikhism in the early 17th century, after having been drafted by Guru Hargobind to work as ironsmiths for the production and maintenance of weaponry in the guru's military forces.

== Present circumstances ==
The Hindu Sikligar of Gujarat continue their traditional occupation of sharpening knives, scissors, household articles and agricultural implements. Economically, they are extremely marginalised, with cases of child labor existing.

The Sikligar in Haryana are now divided into two groups, the Hindu Sikligar and Sikh Sikligar. The difference in religions mean that both groups are distinct communities, with no intermarriage. Both speak the Haryanvi dialect. They are found mainly in the districts of Hissar, Jind, Rohtak, Sirsa and Mohendargarh. Settled in hamlets on the outskirts of towns and villages, living often in thatched huts, they are further divided into 84 clans, known as gotras. The main ones being the Chauhan, Nirban, Taunk, Kalilot, Mohil, Joone, Dugoli Ke, Moyal, Padyar, Khankhara, Bhati, Dhare, Khichi, Ghelot, Badke, Dangi, Jaspal, Patwa, Solanki, Matlana, Dagar, and Banwari. Their main occupation remains metal burnishing. They are involved in the manufacturing of implements such as spades, sickles, sieves and iron baskets. A small number are now farmers, raising poultry and cattle.

In Punjab, the Sikligar are still engaged in the manufacture of swords, knives, daggers and buckets, selling these implements directly to villagers. The Sikh Sikligar are strictly endogamous, and practice clan exogamy; their customs are similar to other Sikh communities in Punjab. They speak Punjabi, with most understanding Hindi.

== Service and support ==
SAF International, a Sikh nonprofit organization based in Canada, has been actively involved in the socio-economic upliftment of the marginalized Sikligar Sikh communities across multiple states in India. In Miryalaguda, Telangana, the organization facilitated the construction of a Gurdwara Sahib to support the community's spiritual and cultural needs. In Gujarat, SAF International has carried out multi-year development efforts focused on education, housing, and basic health access to improve the living standards of Sikligar families.
