= Pataudi =

- Tehsil
- Location in Haryana, India Pataudi (India)
- Coordinates: 28.32°N 76.78°E
- Country: India
- State: Haryana
- District: Gurugram

Government
  - Body: Municipal Committee of Pataudi
  - Lok Sabha constituency: Gurugram Lok Sabha Constituency
  - Vidhan Sabha constituency: Pataudi Constituency
- Elevation: 234 m (768 ft)

Population (2001)
  - Total: 16,064

Languages
  - Official: Hindi
  - Regional: Ahirwati (Haryanvi)
- Time zone: UTC+5:30 (IST)
- PIN: 122 503
- ISO 3166 code: IN-HR
- Vehicle registration: HR-76
- Website: haryana.gov.in

Pataudi is a town, a tehsil and one of the 4 sub-divisions of Gurugram district, in the Indian state of Haryana, within the boundaries of the National Capital Region of India. It is located 28 km (17.4 mi) southwest of Gurugram city. It was also the seat of ertwhile princely state, Pataudi State, which was established in 1804 by Faiz Talab Khan through a land grant from Lord Lake, and later it acceeded to the Union of India in 1948.

Gurgaon-Pataudi road, known as Pataudi Road, was a state highway, SH 26, and is being converted to a national highway, NH 352W, in 2023 as an alternative parallel highway to NH 48, the Delhi-Jaipur highway to reduce the congestion on NH 48. The road has been included as the new growth corridors in Gurugram.

== History ==
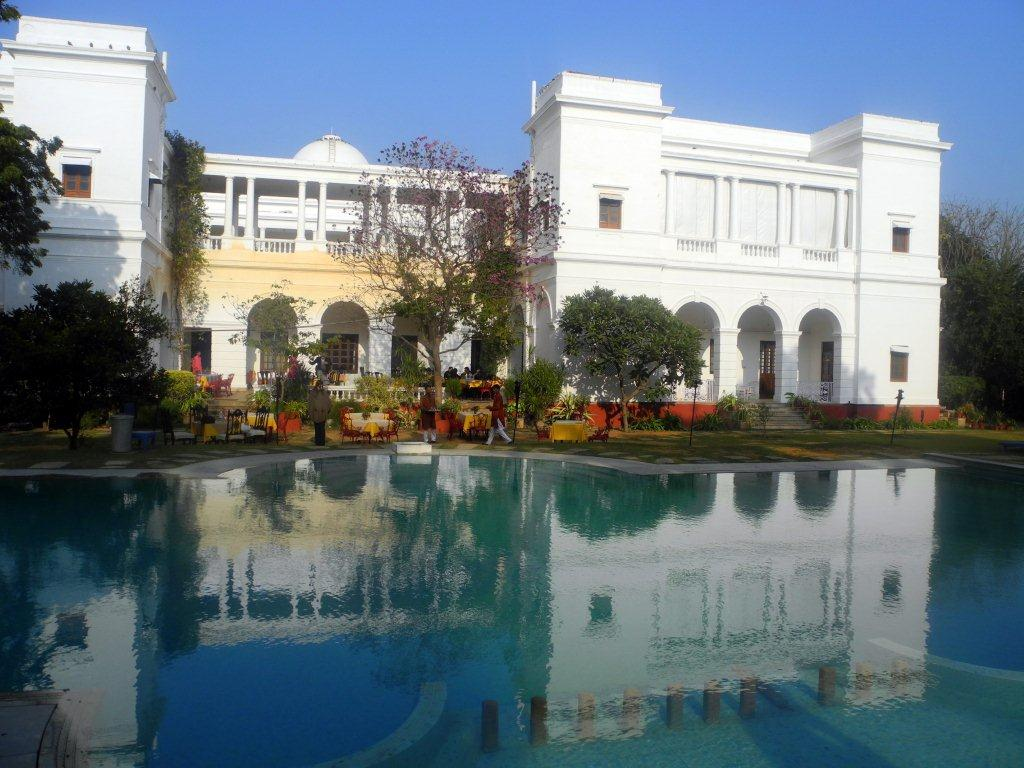
View of Pataudi Palace.

Pataudi town which later became the capital of Pataudi State was founded in 13th-century, the time of Jalaluddin Khilji, Sultan of Delhi (r. 1290 – 1296 CE), by a Mewati named Pata, from whom the town derives its name.The small princely state Pataudi State was formed in 1804 by East India Company with 40 villages including Pataudi village (as it was then) as reward to Faiz Talab Khan a Pashtun of the Barech tribe for aiding the Company against the Maratha Empire during the Second Anglo-Maratha War and the English made Faiz Talab Khan Nawab of Pataudi. By 1901, it has a population of 4171. It was subsumed into Union of India in 1947.

Mansoor Ali Khan son of the former nawab was former captain of India cricket team. His residence was converted into a hotel but bought back by his actor son later.

Nearby Akbar Manzil, built after 1857 as the official residence of the then Nawab, was later converted into a kachehri (judicial complex), and is now used as a godown (store).

== Geography ==
Pataudi town is located at 28.32°N 76.78°E. It has an average elevation of 234 metres (769 feet). Pataudi is semi arid area and experiences low rainfall.

== Demographics ==
As of 2001 India census, Pataudi had a population of 16,064. Males constitute 53% of the population and females 47%. Pataudi has an average literacy rate of 57%, lower than the national average of 59.5%: male literacy is 65%, and female literacy is 48%. In Pataudi, 17% of the population is under 6 years of age. Their main occupation is farming. Rao Kanwar Singh Yadav ( father of Krishan Lal Yadav and Ram Avtar Yadav ) the famous freedom fighter of Quni Daultabad village is also from Pataudi.

The Ahirs/Yadav dominate the area while the Rajputs constitute 12,000 with about equal number of Jats.

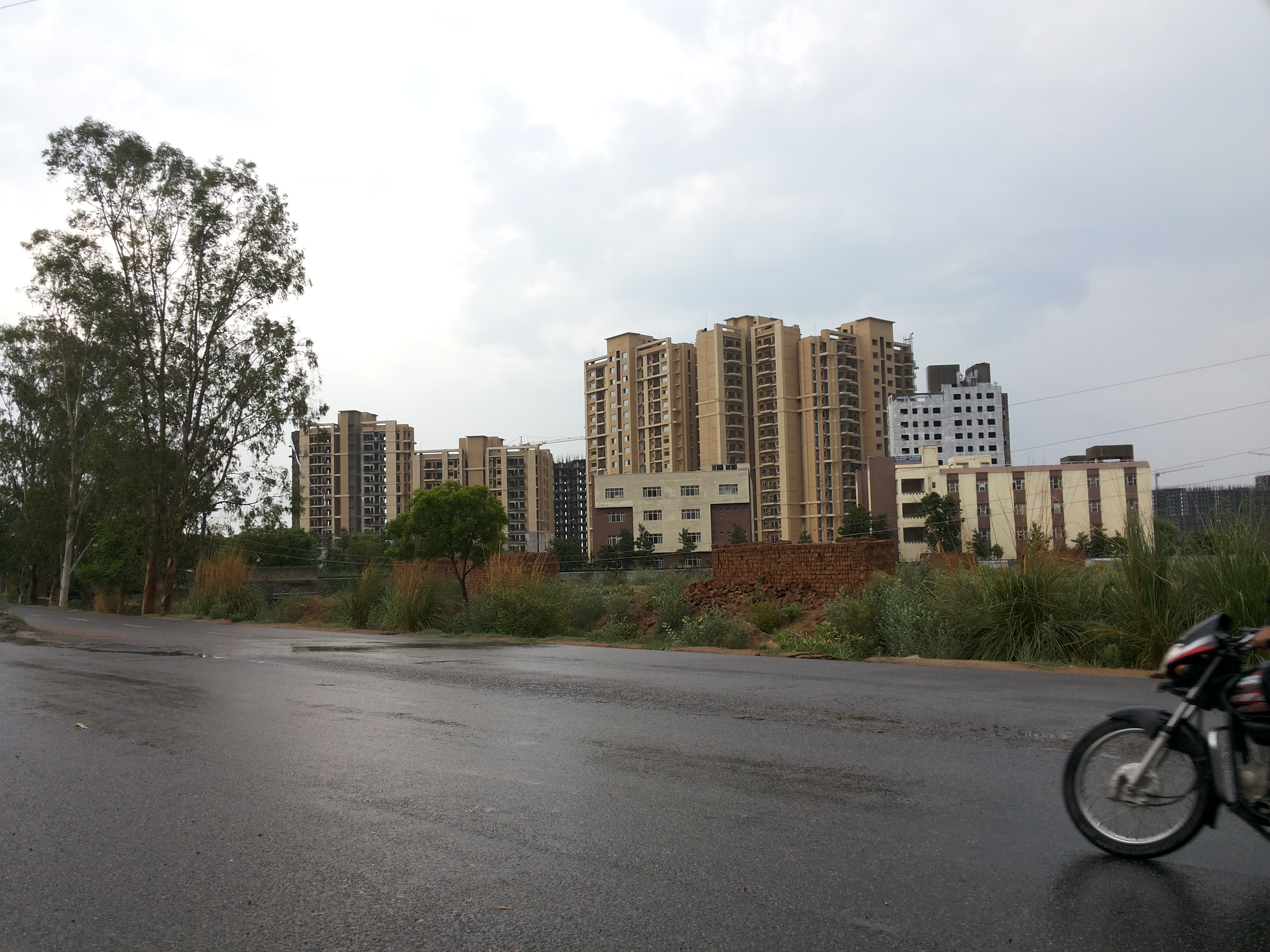
Construction activities on Newly constructed Pataudi Road

== Real estate development ==
Pataudi Road from Garhi Harsaru to KMP Expressway has seen real estate development in the past two decades but there has not been much development near Pataudi town. Several residential units coming up on the Pataudi Road, the logistics park, Special Economic Zones (SEZs) by Reliance, Raheja Engineering SEZ and a commercial sector.

A draft development plan for Pataudi town is being prepared. It is expected to have about 4–5 sectors.

== New City in Pataudi ==
BJP Government chief minister Manohar Lal Khattar announced a new city adjoining Gurugram in June 2018. In this, the area from Manesar towards Rewari and the area around Pataudi will be incorporated. The new city is likely to be spread across at least 50,000 hectares, which is larger than Chandigarh (11,400 hectares) but smaller than Gurugram (73,200 hectares). The city will come up in PPP mode. The other aspects of developing the city in a planned manner will be prepared by the consultant in the detailed master plan." The proposed city will be well connected to neighbouring urban centres through national and state highways, the Kundli-Manesar-Palwal (KMP) Expressway and other major districts roads. The consultant is also expected to suggest the road network plan, metro rail plan, required rail and road linkages and public transportation for the proposed city and assess the proposed social, economic and physical infrastructure.

== Transport ==
Northern Peripheral Road NH 248-BB commonly known as Dwarka Expressway has been constructed. Pataudi Road NH 352W connects Pataudi town to this Dwarka Expressway. The old alignment of Pataudi Road continues from Dwarka Expressway to Gurgaon city as a city road.

A new link road has been made by HUDA connecting Manesar with Patuadi road near Wazirpur village. The length of the road is 3.5 km.

=== Rail ===
Pataudi Road railway station operated by Northern Railway of Indian Railways is located near Haileymandi 3 km from Pataudi. Trains between Rewari and Delhi pass through this station and some of them stop here.

== See also ==
- Pataudi family
