= Pandwala Kalan =

Pandwala Kalan, also spelled Pandwalan Kalan and officially Pindwala Kalan, is a village in South West Delhi district of Delhi, India. It is one of the largest villages by area, the tenth most popular village with over 3,779 people in the Kapashera Tehsil of South-West Delhi. It is bounded by the Daulatpur and Hasanpur villages to the south, Ujawa village to the southwest, Pandwala Khurd on the southeast, Shri Hans Nagar and Khera Dabar to the west, and Paprawat to the northeast.

== Demographics ==
The village is dominated by people of the Yadav community. There are two gotras of Yadavs in this village, Aphariya and Gothwal. There are Brahmins in the village as well. There are three gotras of Brahmins: Dixit, Vats and Bhardwaj. There is also a large population of Scheduled Castes.

== Location and infrastructure ==
It is almost 1.5 kilometers away from Jhatikra road which connects this village to Najafgarh, a semi-urban development in the city. The fields of this area are covered by greenery and a very hygienic natural atmosphere. A high voltage electricity line has been constructed over this village passing through the fields and connecting a major power station of this area placed at village Ghummanhera. One more main road connects Pandwala Kalan to Najafgarh that is Galibpur road passing through the Khaira village. Meetha Kuan is oldest well in the village. The village also has two government borewells which provide drinking water. It is the only village in Najafgarh district in which borewell water can be used for drinking while in other villages of Najafgarh the groundwater is not suitable for drinking. Other than these two borewells a new underground water supply has been started from village Daulatpur to Pandwala Kalan which sends water almost all the day. The village is about 15 km away from Indira Gandhi International Airport, and 2 km away from Chaudhary Brahm Prakash Ayurved Charak Sansthan. The village is has been declared as an R-Zone by the Delhi government.

== Facilities ==
It has a green environment with a few temples with great history. The main and famous temple of the village is Ramtal Mandir. The others are Hanuman Temple and Shiva Temple. Hanuman Temple is the oldest one. A mela is organised in the Ramtal Mandir every year on the last two days of Navaratri and a bhandara (feast) on 30 January of every year.

It contains a primary school and the Sr. Sec. School Chatarpati Shivaji. The Sushil International School managed by wrestler Sushil Kumar's foundation and is situated next to Shri Hans Nagar Colony on the main Najafgarh–Darulla road in Pandwala Kalan.

The village has its own post office.
