= Pandwalan Khurd =

Village in Delhi, India

Pandwala Khurd
- Village
- Location within Delhi
- Coordinates: 28°33′33″N 76°57′49″E
- Country: India
- Union territory: Delhi
- District: South West Delhi
- Tehsil: Kapashera

Area
  - Total: 2.72 km^{2} (1.05 sq mi)

Population (2011)
  - Total: 1,898
- Time zone: UTC+5:30 (IST)
- PIN: 110043
- 2011 census code: 064028

Pandwala Khurd, also spelled Pandwalan Khurd and officially Pindwala Khurd, is a village in Kapashera tehsil in the Najafgarh area of South West Delhi district in Delhi, India. In the names of paired settlements in northern India, khurd marks the smaller of the two and kalan the larger; the neighbouring village of Pandwala Kalan is the other of this pair. At the 2011 census it had a population of 1,898 living in 353 households.

In elections to the Delhi Legislative Assembly, the village falls in the Matiala Assembly constituency, which forms part of the West Delhi Lok Sabha constituency.

During the 2026 anti-CEC protests in India demanding the resignation of Chief Election Commissioner (CEC) Gyanesh Kumar, the community centre at Pandwala Khurd, under the Chhawla Police Station, was named as one of eight temporary detention centres by the Modi government. At least 50 people were detained on 11 October and taken about 40 km from the protest sites at Connaught Place and Jantar Mantar, including minors. The protesters were subject to police brutality at the centre including beatings, denial of food, water and medical aid and access to lawyers. The lawyers were initially refused entry despite a Supreme Court order that morning that lawyers and journalists could not be obstructed.

== Demographics ==
At the 2011 census, Pandwala Khurd had 353 households and a population of 1,898, of whom 1,010 were male and 888 female, a sex ratio of 879 females per 1,000 males. Children aged 0–6 numbered 240 (12.6%). The effective literacy rate was 85.34% (male 93.26%, female 76.47%). Scheduled Castes numbered 416 (21.9%) and no Scheduled Tribes were recorded.
