= Khori (disambiguation) =

Khori is a village in the Huzur tehsil, Bhopal district, Madhya Pradesh state, India.

Khori may also refer to:

Places:

- Khori Mahuwa subdivision in the Indian state of Jharkhand
  - Khori Mahua, a village in Khori Mahuwa subdivision
- Khar-Khori, Sibsagar, a village in Sibsagar tehsil, Sibsagar district, Assam state, India

People:

- Khori Ivy, an American football coach
- Khori Dastoor, an American operatic soprano and actress

Other:

- Khori, a dialect group of the Buryat language

== See also ==
- Kori (disambiguation)
- Kora (disambiguation)
- Korha (disambiguation)
- Korra (disambiguation)
- Koda (disambiguation)
- Khora
