= Kharkhari Nahar =

Village in Najafgarh Tehsil

Coordinates: 28°35′N 76°58′E

Kharkhari Nahar is a village located in Najafgarh Tehsil of South West Delhi district in Delhi, India. It is situated 4 km away from sub-district headquarter Najafgarh and 30 km away from district headquarter Kapashera.

The total geographical area of village is 194.7 hectares. Kharkhari Nahar has a total population of 1,328 peoples. There are about 273 houses in Kharkhari Nahar village. Najafgarh is nearest town to Kharkhari Nahar.

There is a community centre (at main road near Khar khari Jatmal bus stand), a meeting centre in the middle of the village, an SDMC primary school and a temple on the opposite side of the primary school. It is a home of various professions i.e. professors, lecturers, scientists, commissioned officers, teachers, junior commissioned officers, doctors, businessmen, politicians, and farmers. 90% of the population is literate. 90% of the population works in government jobs.

Kharkhari Nahar connects the adjacent areas of Surhera, Khaira, Kharkhari Jatmal and Paprawat. The village mostly consists of the Ahir community. Brahmins Vats are Located in front side of this village. It has well-developed roads and a good drainage system. It is among 24 villages of Delhi which have yet to get submerged into the main urban area. The prevalence of agriculture makes it greener and less polluted than the surrounding area.

During latest developments village will be part of Master plan 2021 'R' zone. Dwarka Part-II will be implemented for local development.
