= Kharkari =

Kharkhari (or Kharkharee in older spelling) may refer to:

== Bangladesh ==
- Kharkhari, Rajshahi, Rajshahi Division

== India ==
- Kharkhari, Birni block, Giridih district, Jharkhand
- Kharkhari, Dhanbad, Dhanbad district, Jharkhand
- Kharkhari, Loharu block (tehsil) and Bhiwani district, Haryana
- Kharkhari, Tisri block, Giridih district, Jharkhand

== Pakistan ==
- Lake Kharkhari

== See also ==
- Kharkhari Nahar, Delhi, India
