= Mary Dunleavy =

American soprano (born 1966)

Mary Dunleavy (born 1966) is an American soprano who has performed with major opera companies and orchestras around the world.

== Life and career ==
Dunleavy grew up in Montvale, New Jersey and graduated from Pascack Hills High School in 1984. Dunleavy attended Northwestern University for her undergraduate degrees and received a master's degree in Music at the University of Texas at Austin. She has studied with Renata Scotto, Mignon Dunn, and Rita Shane.

In the United States, she has performed with the Metropolitan Opera, San Francisco Opera, Lyric Opera of Chicago, Houston Grand Opera, Los Angeles Opera, Washington National Opera, New York City Opera, The Dallas Opera, Opera Company of Philadelphia, Opera Theatre of Saint Louis, Boston Lyric Opera, Portland Opera, Lyric Opera of Kansas City, Minnesota Opera, Des Moines Metro Opera and others. Mary also appears in Steven Spielberg's film Lincoln performing as Marguerite in Faust and in the independent short as Geraldine in A Hand of Bridge .

Outside the U.S., her operatic performances have been with De Nederlandse Opera (Amsterdam), Gran Teatro del Liceu (Barcelona), Opéra National de Paris, Teatro di San Carlo (Naples), La Monnaie (Brussels), Municipal Theater of Santiago, Staatsoper Unter den Linden (Berlin), Hamburgische Staatsoper, Opéra de Montréal, Garsington Opera and others.

Orchestral appearances have been with the Los Angeles Philharmonic at the Hollywood Bowl under Leonard Slatkin, Cincinnati May Festival with James Conlon, Ensemble Orchestral de Paris under John Nelson, St. Louis Symphony under David Robertson and the late Hans Vonk, San Francisco Symphony under Robert Spano, Atlanta Symphony Orchestra under Donald Runnicles, Philadelphia Orchestra under Charles Dutoit, the Lanaudiere Festival under Jacques Lacombe, and others.

Dunleavy has been a resident of Verona, New Jersey.

She is a native of Old Saybrook, Connecticut.

== Roles ==
Roles during her career have included:

• Violetta — La Traviata (Verdi)
• Gilda — Rigoletto (Verdi)
• Mimi — La Boheme (Puccini)
• Musetta — La Boheme (Puccini)
• Giulietta — I Capuleti e i Montecchi (Bellini)
• Adina — L'elisir d'amore (Donizetti)
• Cio-Cio-San — Madama Butterfly (Puccini)
• Lucia — Lucia di Lammermoor (Donizetti)
• Pamina — Die Zauberflöte
• Donna Anna — Don Giovanni (Mozart)
• Donna Elvira — Don Giovanni (Mozart)
• Konstanze — Die Entführung aus dem Serail (Mozart)
• Countess Almaviva — Le nozze di Figaro (Mozart)
• Susanna — Le nozze di Figaro (Mozart)
• Fiordiligi — Così fan tutte (Mozart)
• Thaïs — Thaïs (Massenet)
• Léïla — Les pêcheurs de perles (Bizet)
• Micaela — Carmen (Bizet)
• Hoffmann Heroines — Les Contes d'Hoffmann (Offenbach)
• Infanta Donna Clara - Der Zwerg (Zemlinsky)
• Christine Storch - Intermezzo
• Adele - Die Fledermaus (Strauss II)
• Rosalinde - Die Fledermaus (Strauss II)
• Millicent Jordan - Dinner at Eight (Bolcom)
• Stepmother - Cinderella (Deutscher)
• Isabella Stewart Gardner - American Apollo

From 1994 through 2002, she sang the Queen of the Night in Die Zauberflöte in 84 performances. She retired the role in 2002. In 2006, she became only the third woman to sing both Pamina and the Queen of the Night for the Metropolitan Opera (Lucia Popp and Colette Boky preceded her).

== Awards ==
- Maria Callas Debut Artist of the Year, The Dallas Opera, 2006
- Outstanding Young Texas Exes Award, The University of Texas at Austin, 2006
- Cultural Award, American-Irish Historical Society, 2004
- Top 100 List, Irish America Magazine, 2003, 2005
