= Samalka =

Village in Delhi, India

Samalkha
- Village
- Samalka
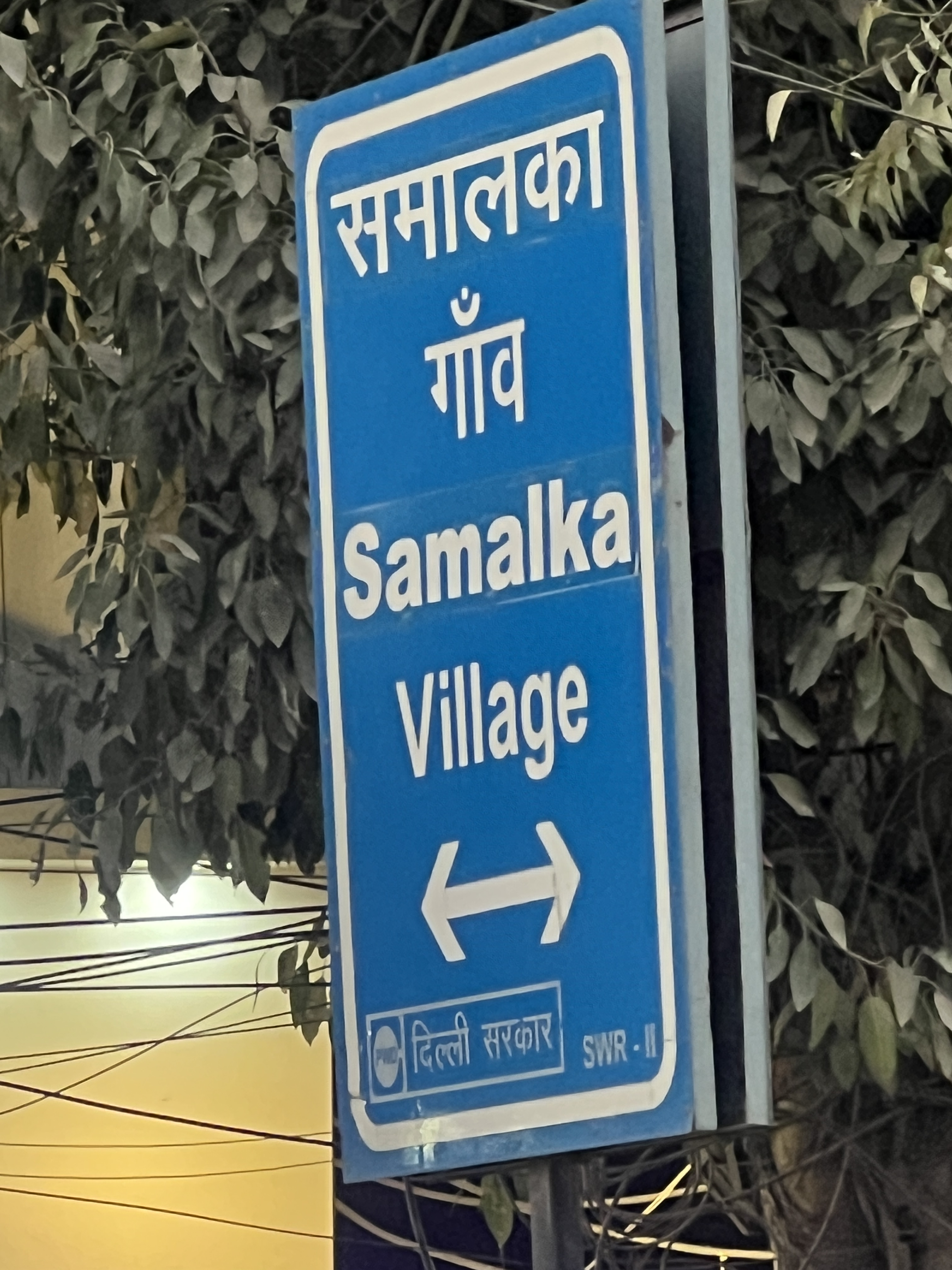
- Country: India
- State: Delhi
- District: South West Delhi
- Tehsil: Vasant Vihar
- PIN code: 110037

Samalka (also spelt as Samalkha) is a village located on Old Delhi-Gurgaon Road, near Kapashera Border and Indira Gandhi International Airport in South West Delhi district in the Delhi State of India.
