= Pithrawas =

- village
- Location in Rewari, Haryana, India Pithrawas (India)
- Coordinates: 28°18′N 76°51′E
- Country: India
- State: Haryana
- District: Rewari

Languages
  - Official: Hindi
- Time zone: UTC+5:30 (IST)
- PIN: 123101
- ISO 3166 code: IN-HR
- Vehicle registration: HR36
- Nearest city: Rewari
- Sex ratio: 1:1 ♂/♀
- Literacy: 100%
- Website: www.rewari.gov.in

Pithrawas is a village in Khol Block of Rewari, Rewari district, Haryana, India, in Gurgaon division. It is 10 kilometres (6.2 mi) west of the district headquarters at Rewari. Its postal head office is at Khori.

== Adjacent villages ==
- Sundroj
- Dhamlawas
- Gumina
- Bhandor
- Shahbajpura Istmurar
- Makharia
- Tint
- Harjipur
- Bohatwas Ahir
- Bawana Gujar
- Mailawas
- Khori
- Pali
