= Harjipur =

- village
- Location in Rewari, Haryana, India Harjipur (India)
- Coordinates: 28°15′N 76°49′E
- Country: India
- State: Haryana
- District: Rewari district

Languages
  - Official: Hindi
- Time zone: UTC+5:30 (IST)
- PIN: 123101
- ISO 3166 code: IN-HR
- Vehicle registration: HR-36
- Nearest city: Rewari
- Sex ratio: 879 ♂/♀
- Literacy: 84.15%
- Website: rewari.gov.in

Harjipur is a village of Khol Block of Rewari, Rewari district, Haryana, India. It is in Gurgaon Division. It is 14 kilometres (8.7 mi) west of the District headquarters at Rewari. Its postal head office is Khori. It is located near Khori Railway station.

== Adjacent villages ==
Bawana Gujar 2 kilometres (1.2 mi), Mailawas 3 kilometres (1.9 mi), Pithrawas 3 kilometres (1.9 mi), Khori 3 kilometres (1.9 mi), Pali 4 kilometres (2.5 mi) are villages near Harjipur. It has an old shiv mandir.
