= Khar-Khori, Sivasagar =

Small Indian village

Coordinates: 26.9413°N 94.4710°E

Khar-Khori or Khar Khori is a tiny village in the Sivasagar tehsil, Sivasagar district, Assam state, India. It is located about 330 km east by northeast of Dispur, 20 km west of Sivasagar, and 5 km southeast of the Brahmaputra River. Its PIN is 785640.

According to the 2011 census, Khar Khori (census code 292599) had 10 households and 31 inhabitants (including 7 children aged 0–6). 23. Its literacy rate was 96%.

== See also ==
- Khori (disambiguation)
- Kharkari (disambiguation)
