= Cinderella (Deutscher) =

Opera by Alma Deutscher

- Opera by Alma Deutscher
- Librettist: Alma Deutscher
- Language: English, German, Hebrew
- Based on: "Cendrillon" by Charles Perrault
- Premiere: 29 December 2016; Vienna

Cinderella is an opera by Alma Deutscher. The libretto is based on the fairy tale "Cinderella", but with significant modifications of the plot. The work was first performed in Israel in 2015 in Chamber version, when Deutscher was 10. The orchestral version premiered in the following year in Vienna, on 29 December 2016.

== Roles ==
Roles, voice types, premiere casts
| Role | Voice type | Vienna premiere cast, 29 December 2016 Conductor: Vinicius Kattah | U.S. premiere cast, December 16, 2017 Conductor: Jane Glover | U.S. premiere cast (revised version), November 12, 2022 Conductor: Alma Deutscher |
|---|---|---|---|---|
| Cinderella, a young and talented composer | soprano | Theresa Krügl | Vanessa Becerra | Natalia Santaliz |
| Prince Theodore, a young and talented poet | tenor | Lorin Wey | Jonas Hacker | Joey Hammond-Leppek |
| King Fridolph, his father and king of Transylvanian. | bass | Gregor Einspieler | Nathan Stark | Ben Brady |
| The Stepmother, an aging prima donna | soprano | Catarina Coresi | Mary Dunleavy | Rena Harms |
| Griselda, her daughter | soprano | Anna Voshege | Stacey Tappan | Stacey Tappan |
| Zibaldona, her daughter | mezzo-soprano | Katrin Koch | Karin Mushegain | Julia Dawson |
| Emeline, a fairy godmother | contralto | Veronika Dünser | Claudia Chapa | Megan E. Grey |
| The Minister, a minister to the king | spoken | Florian Stanek | Brian James Myer | Joshua Hughes |
Chorus: ball guests, elves, church chorus at the royal wedding

== Plot ==
In Transylvanian, in an opera house run by her stepmother, Cinderella is a talented composer, but she is not allowed to perform and is forced to work as a music copyist. Her two stepsisters are talentless would-be divas. Prince Theodore, a poet, is mocked at court for his artistic leanings. Cinderella chances upon a captivating love poem, which unbeknownst to her, was written by the Prince. She is inspired by the poem and sets it to music. Her beautiful melody is stolen by her stepsisters and performed at the singing competition during the royal ball, but with the wrong words. Finally, Cinderella herself sings her song to the prince with the right words, still unaware that he is the poet who wrote them.

After Cinderella flees from the ball at midnight, the prince searches for her using as the test that will identify her the haunting melody she sang as she fled. Eventually, the pair "find each other like lyrics find melody".

== Releases and updates ==
A chamber version of the opera was premiered in Israel in 2015, when Deutscher was 10. She finished writing the overture "just a few days before the performance". In the following year, Deutscher expanded the opera and orchestrated it for an ensemble of 20 musicians, and this expanded version premiered in Vienna in 2016 (in German), with conductor Zubin Mehta as patron of the production. Deutscher performed the solo violin part in the opera as well as the solo piano. The opera was received with jubilation by the public, and reports about it appeared in newspapers all over the world, even on the front page of the China Daily newspaper. Numerous Viennese critics expressed their astonishment at the accomplishment of Deutscher's orchestral writing, and above all at the beauty of her melodies.

== Adaptations ==
A further elaborated version of the opera received its U.S. premiered in December 2017, in a production of Opera San José and the Packard Humanities Institute, conducted by Dame Jane Glover. As in Vienna, Deutscher performed the violin and piano solo parts herself, and she also performed an organ voluntary at the beginning of the royal wedding scene. The five original performances sold out and further performances were added. The New Criterion called it an "opera of astounding wit, craft, and musical beauty... The sheer amount of orchestral and vocal invention is stunning", and predicted that Cinderella would find its way to Broadway. The magazine Opera Today described it as "a young talent's sensational burst to prominence... a once-in-a-lifetime opera-going event that had audiences standing and cheering." The San Jose production was released on DVD by Sony Classical Records in 2018.

In 2018, the Vienna State Opera staged an adaptation for children, which ran for two sold-out seasons, and was released on DVD on the State Opera's own label.

In 2019 Deutscher further revised the opera for a new production at the Salzburg State Theatre which premiered in the season 2019/20 and was revived in 2020/21.

In 2022 an adaptation for children was performed in at the Wexford Festival Opera.

A revival of the 2017 Opera San Jose production, but with thoroughly revised music, was staged in November 2022, with Deutscher on the podium as musical director, making her opera conducting debut. A recording of this production was released for free streaming in July 2023.
