= Shiv Prasad Dabral =

Historian and writer of Uttarakhand

- Born: 12 November 1912; Gahli, Pauri Garhwal
- Died: 24 November 1999 (aged 87)
- Education: Meerut College (BA) Allahabad College (MA) Agra University (PhD)
- Occupations: Historian; Writer; Professor
- Writing career
- Language: Hindi; Garhwali
- Notable work: History of Uttarakhand (12 volumes)

Shiv Prasad Dabral (12 November 1912 – 24 November 1999), known by his pen name Charan, was an Indian historian, geographer, academic and writer from Uttarakhand. He is also known as 'Encyclopedia of Uttarakhand'. He started writing from 1931 onwards. He is the author of the monumental history of Uttarakhand in 18 volumes, 2 collections of poetry, 9 plays, and several edited volumes in Hindi and Garhwali. His Uttarakhand ka Itihaas (History of Uttarakhand) is widely used by scholars as reference work. He authored several books on the archeology and ecology of Uttarakhand. To his credit, Charan saved 22 rare books of Garhwali language from extinction by republishing them at his own press. He also rediscovered a rare poetry manuscript of Mola Ram.

== Biography ==
=== Early life and family ===
Charan was born on 12 November 1912 in Gahli village of Pauri Garhwal district of Uttarakhand. His father Krishna Datt Dabral was the headmaster of local primary school. His mother's name was Bhanumati Devi. In 1935, he married Vishweshwari Devi.

=== Education and career ===
Charan received his primary education from primary schools of Mandai and Gadsir and further passed middle examination from Vernacular Anglo Middle School Silogi (Gumkhal). He completed BA (Bachelor of Arts) from Meerut and BEd (Bachelor of Education) from Allahabad. He did his MA Geography from Agra University. In 1962, he completed his doctorate (PhD) in Geography.

Charan served as the Principal of D.A.B. College in Dugadda from 1948 until his retirement in 1975.

=== Work and research ===
Charan's thesis 'Alaknanda-Basin A Study of Transhumance, Nomadism and Seasonal Migration' was later published as three books. The lifestyle of the Bhotiyas and pastoralists of Uttarakhand influenced him deeply and he started research in their history. From 1956, he started his research on Bhotyas in the village of Malari, which later drew him to the ancient mausoleums of Malari also therefore to archeology. His findings on the mausoleums were published as articles in Karmabhoomi, which in due course of time led to ASI to conduct proper research on the site.

From 1960 onwards, Charan studied the archaeological remains of Panduwala, Kotdwar, Mordhwaj, Parasnath fort and Virbhadra and collected the materials scattered in various archives. Along with this, he studied religious places, temples and sculpture architecture of Uttarakhand and also discovered inscriptions and coins.

He also opened his own press and published books under the name of Veergatha Prakashan. In the course of time, he had collected about 3000 books, rare manuscripts, coins and utensils of archaeological importance by opening a library and museum named "Uttarakhand Vidya Bhavan" at his house in Dugadda (Saruda).

He published his research work mainly on the migratory routes of pastoralists of Uttarakhandi in the year 1963–64 in the form of three books Alaknanda Upataka, Uttarakhand Ke Bhotantik and Uttarakhand Ke Pashucharak.

Thereafter, he focused his energy on preparing the history of Uttarkhand and thus, in the year 1965, Uttarakhand ka Itihaas Part-1 (Evidence Compilation) was published. In 1968, the second part of the history of Uttarakhand was published, which covered the period from the beginning to the fifth century BCE. The following year, the third part was published, which presented the history until the end of the Kalchurias. Part IV was published in 1971, which was an attempt to reconcile the history of Garhwal from the thirteenth century to the Gorkha invasion.

In 1972, History of Garhwal was published, in which the new materials and evidences found after the publication of earlier four parts was compiled. Part 5 was published in 1973, which was a detailed study of Gorkha rule in Uttarakhand and Himachal. Therefore, two volumes of Part 7 (1976 and 1978) were published. Both the volumes were focused on British colonial rule in Garhwal. Part 9 was published as Garhwal ka Padyamaya Itihasa in 1979.

Publication was stopped for a few years, but Charan continued his research and writing work. In the meantime, the Veergatha Press was closed. Part 10 The History of Kumaon (from 1000 to 1790), published in 1978, which was a detailed study of the later Kalchuris and the Chauhan dynasty. In the same year, Garhwal ka Navin Itihas was published in the form of Part 11, in which new material was presented from Kalchuri to Chauhan rule. Part 12 was based on the Panwar dynasty. In Part 13, Uttarāṃcala ke Abhilekha evama Mudrā (Uttarakhand's Records and Currency) sources for the history of Uttarakhand were examined in 1990. Uttaranchal-Himachal ka Prachin Itihas (The ancient history of Uttaranchal-Himachal) was published in 3 volumes in 1992–95. In 1998, Pragaitihasik Uttarakhand (Prehistoric Uttarakhand) was published.

In 1999, poetic compositions - Shaktamat ki Gatha and Matrudevi were published.

Charan republished more than twenty rare texts related to history, poetry, drama and folk literature of Garhwal. In each of the texts, he added meaningful commentaries. Among them, the works of Mola Ram are important. Moularam Granthavali was published and printed from Dogadda in 1977.

== Works ==
1. Uttarākhaṃḍa Yātrā Darśana (उत्तराखंड यात्रा दर्शन)
2. History of Uttarkhand (12 Volumes) (उत्तराखंड का इतिहास -12 चरणों में)
3. Uttarāṃcala ke Abhilekha evama Mudrā (उत्तरांचल के अभिलेख एवम मुद्रा)
4. Alaknanda-Basin A Study of Transhumance, Nomadism and Seasonal Migration (3 books)
5. Guhāditya (गुहादित्य)
6. Gorā Bādala (गोरा बादल)
7. Mahārāṇā Saṃgrāma Siṃha (महाराणा संग्राम सिंह)
8. Pannādhāya (पन्नाधाय)
9. Sadeī (सदेई)
10. Satīrāmā (सतीरामा)
11. Rāṣṭra Rakṣā Kāvya (राष्ट्र रक्षा काव्य)
12. Gaḍhavālī (गढ़वाली)
13. Meghadūta (मेघदूत)
14. Hutātmā Paricaya (हुतात्मा परिचय)
15. Atīta Smṛti (अतीत स्मृति)
16. Saṃgharṣa Saṃgīta (संघर्ष संगीत)
17. Alaknanda Upataka,
18. Uttarakhand Ke Bhotantik
19. Uttarakhand Ke Pashucharak.
