= Qutab Pur =

Coordinates: 28.7904692°N 77.77648°E

Qutab Pur, Delhi
- Village
- Interactive map of Qutab Pur, Delhi
- Country: India
- State: Delhi
- District: South West Delhi

Area
  - Total: 144.5 ha (357 acres)

Population
  - Total: 26,275(2,009)

Qutab Pur is a village located in Najafgarh Tehsil of South West Delhi district in the Union Territory of Delhi in India. It is governed by Na Gram Panchayat.

== Demographics ==
The total geographical area of village is 144.5 hectares (2009). Qutab Pur has a total population of 26,275. The male and female populations are 14,287 and 11,988 respectively. There are about 5,204 houses in Qutab Pur .
