= Asalat Pur Khawad =

- Village
- Nickname: Khawad
- Location in Delhi, India
- Coordinates: 28°32′30″N 76°57′03″E
- Country: India
- State: Delhi
- District: South West

Government
  - Advocate: Lalit Rana

Population (2015)
  - Total: 1,387

Languages
  - Official: Hindi, English
- Time zone: UTC+5:30 (IST)
- PIN: 110043

Asalat Pur Village (Village ID 64035), commonly known as Khawad, is a census village, populated by Jats, in the South West Delhi district of Delhi, India. According to the 2011 census it has a population of 422 living in 85 households. Its main occupation is vegetable farming.
