= Khol Block of Rewari =

Khol Block Khol
- village
- Location in Rewari, Haryana, India Khol Block (India)
- Coordinates: 28°20′N 76°33′E
- Country: India
- State: Haryana
- District: Rewari

Languages
  - Official: Hindi
- Time zone: UTC+5:30 (IST)
- PIN: 123103
- Vehicle registration: HR36
- Nearest city: Rewari
- Sex ratio: 1:1 ♂/♀
- Literacy: 100%
- Website: www.rewari.gov.in

Khol Block consists of 58 Gram Panchayats and 66 Villages and 123103 is its pincode number.

== Name of Villages of Khol Block ==
1.Aaliawas

2.Ahrod pin code-123102

3.Balwari

4.Bass

5.Bass Dudha

6.Bawana Gujar

7.Bhalkhi

8.Bhandor

9.Bhathera

10.Bithori

11.(A) Bohatwas Ahir (B) Bangrawa -Name of Gram Panchyat- Bohatwas Ahir

12.Bohka

13.Buroli

14.Cheeta Dungra

15.Chimnawas

16.Dhamlawas

17.Dhani Santo

18.Dhani Sobha

19.Dhani Sundroj

20.Dhani Thather Bad

21.Dhawana

22. Goliaka

23. Gopalpur urf Pranpura

24. Gothra Tappa Khori

25. Gumina

26. Harjipur

27.Khaleta

28.Khol

KUND

29.Khori

30.Kolana

31.Kundal

32.Lohana

33.Mailawas

34.Majra Mustal Bhalkhi

35.(A) Mamaria Ahir, (B) Govindpuri-Name of Gram Panchyat- Mamaria Ahir

36.(A) Mamaria Asampur, (B) Kadhu (Bhawanipur)-Name of Gram Panchyat- Mamaria Asampur

37.Mamaria Thethar

38(A) Mandola, (B) Siri Nagar- Name of Gram Panchyat- Mandola

39.Manethi

40.(A) Mayan- (B) Nangla Mayan- Name of Gram Panchyat- Mayan

41.Mundi

42.Nandha

43.Nangal Jamalpur

44.Nimoth

45.Padla

46.Pali

47.Pithrawas

48.Pranpura

49.Punsika

50.Rajiaka

51.Rajpura Istmurar

52.Roliawas

53.(A) Shahbajpur Istmurar, (B) Makhria-Name of Gram Panchyat-Shahbajpur Istmurar

54.Siha

55.(A) Sundroj, (B) Bad Jathu,(C) Bad Sundroj-Name of Gram Panchyat- Sundroj

56.Tint

57.Uncha (Dhani Jawarat)

58.Dhawana

59.Zainabad
