= Alma Deutscher =

British composer, pianist and violinist (born 2005)

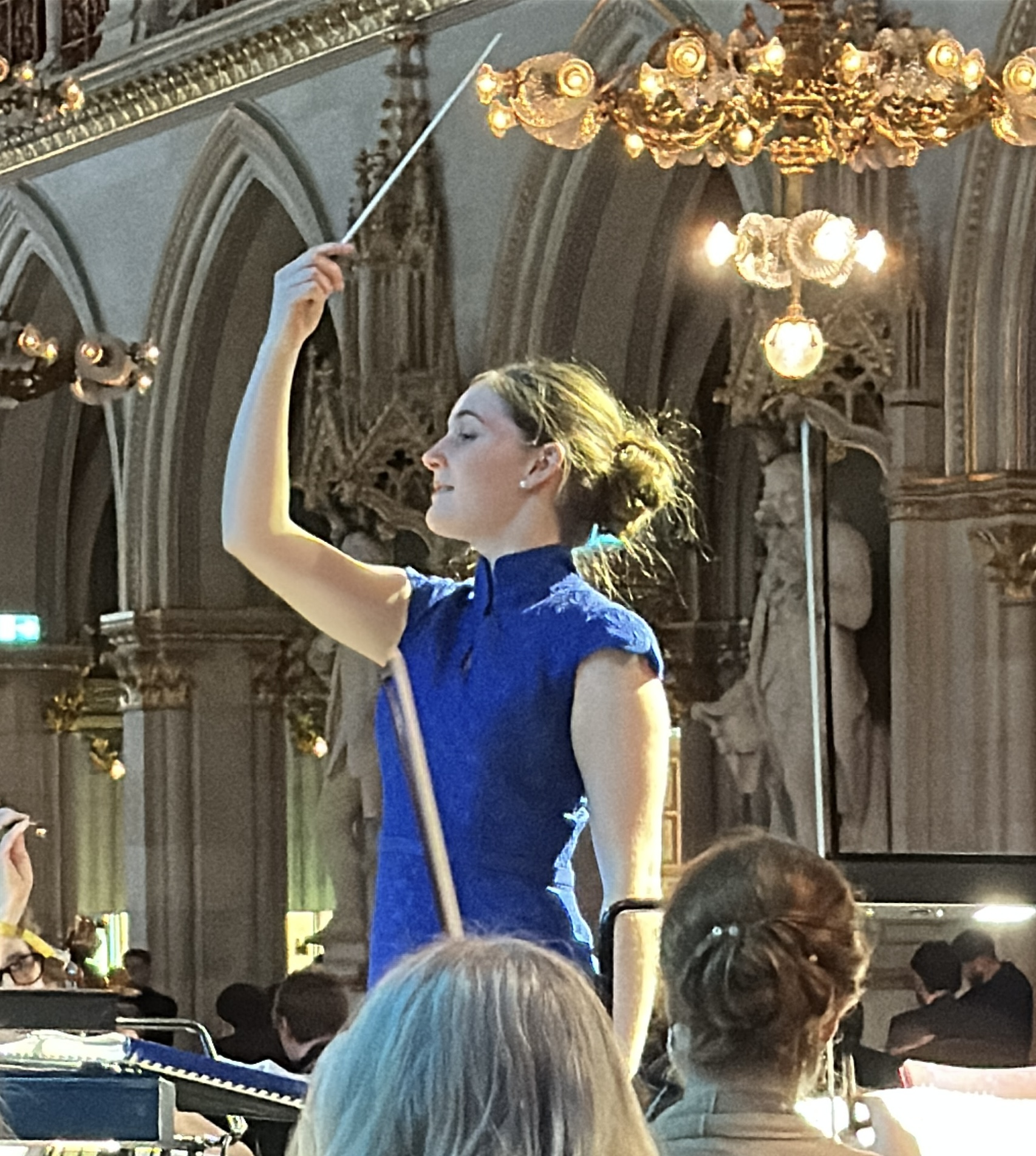
- Deutscher in 2025
- Born: Alma Elizabeth Deutscher; 19 February 2005 (age 21); Basingstoke, England
- Education: University of Music and Performing Arts Vienna
- Occupations: Composer; conductor; pianist; violinist
- Notable work: Cinderella; Waltz of the Sirens
- Parents: Guy Deutscher (father); Janie Deutscher (mother)
- Website: www.almadeutscher.com

Alma Elizabeth Deutscher (/ˈdɔɪtʃər/ DOY-chər; born 19 February 2005) is a British composer, pianist, violinist and conductor. She composed her first piano sonata at the age of five; at seven, she completed the short opera, The Sweeper of Dreams, and later wrote a violin concerto at age nine. At the age of ten, she wrote her first full-length opera, Cinderella, which had its European premiere in Vienna in 2016 under the patronage of conductor Zubin Mehta, and its U.S. premiere a year later. Deutscher's piano concerto was premiered when she was 12. She has lived in Vienna, Austria, since 2018. She made her debut at Carnegie Hall in 2019 in a concert dedicated to her own compositions.

== Background and education ==
Alma Elizabeth Deutscher was born on 19 February 2005, in Basingstoke, England. She is the daughter of literary scholar Janie (née Steen) and linguist Guy Deutscher. Deutscher also has a younger sister, Helen Clara.

She began playing piano at the age of two, followed by violin at three. Her strong affinity to music was apparent from an early age. She could sing in perfect pitch before she could speak, and she could read music before she could read words. In a 2017 interview with the Financial Times, Deutscher said: "I remember when I was three and I was listening to a lullaby by Richard Strauss, I loved it! I especially loved the harmony; I always call it the Strauss harmony now. And after it finished I asked my parents 'How could music be so beautiful?'" She received a little violin as a present on her third birthday, and while her parents thought it would just be another toy, she was "so excited by it and tried playing on it for days on end", so her parents decided to find her a teacher. Within a year she was playing Handel sonatas.

At four she was improvising on the piano, and by five, had begun writing down her own compositions. These first written notations were unclear, but by age six, she could write clear compositions and had composed her first piano sonata, a recording of which was released in 2013. At seven, she composed her first short opera, The Sweeper of Dreams, at nine, a violin concerto, and her first full-length opera at age ten.

Until the age of 16, Deutscher was educated at home. She was registered for a school in England when she was five, but after attending the first orientation day, she came back in tears, and told her parents: "they haven't taught me to read and write". Her parents then decided to educate her at home. They later explained on the BBC Documentary Imagine and on CBS's 60 Minutes that they were led to choose home education by their realization that their daughter's "volcanic imagination" and creativity were essential to her well-being, and they came to the conclusion that the freedom required for this intense creativity and imagination cannot be provided in a school. Deutscher herself told the BBC when she was ten: "I never want to go to school. I have to go outside and get fresh air, and read." Two years later she explained to the Financial Times: "I think that I learn at home in one hour what it would take at school five hours to learn".

In his 2017 BBC Documentary about Alma Deutscher, Alan Yentob described this intense world of imagination, in which Deutscher had created an imaginary country called "Transylvanian", with its own language and above all its own music. "I made up my own land with its own language and there are beautiful composers there, named Antonin Yellowsink and Ashy and Shell and Flara". These imaginary composers each had a different musical style, and Deutscher assigned various of her early compositions to these composers.

Deutscher's early musical education focused on creative improvisation, following a method of teaching called Partimenti, which was developed in eighteenth-century Italy, and which has been revived and popularized by Professor Robert Gjerdingen. Gjerdingen sent exercises for Alma Deutscher and commented on technical aspects of her composition, while she had lessons in improvisation with the Swiss musician Tobias Cramm. Deutscher thus initially became fluent in the musical grammar of eighteenth-century music, which she later described as her musical "mother tongue".

Deutscher came to popular media attention in 2012, when she was seven, after writer and comedian Stephen Fry commented on her YouTube channel: "Simply mind-blowing: Alma Deutscher playing her own compositions. A new Mozart?" In 2014, a television program hosted by renowned pianist and pedagogue Arie Vardi, featuring performance and improvisation by Deutscher brought her to the attention of leading figures in the classical music world, including conductor Zubin Mehta. In the same year, a viral YouTube mashup video released by musician Kutiman featured an ostinato from one of Deutscher's early videos.

In 2017, a CBS-60 Minutes feature with Scott Pelley about Deutscher created a stir and won an Emmy Award.

In 2018, Deutscher moved with her family to Vienna. She explained to The New York Times in 2019: "I grew up on the music of Mozart, Schubert, Beethoven, and Haydn. Musically speaking, I think that Vienna's always been my home."

In 2021, she was admitted to the conducting degree at the University of Music and Performing Arts Vienna, to study with conductor Johannes Wildner. At 16, she may have been the youngest student ever to be admitted to this conducting course, whose alumni include Zubin Mehta, Claudio Abbado and Kirill Petrenko.

In the first years of her life, Deutscher was the subject of her father's linguistic experiments related to his professional research. In an effort to understand why ancient cultures did not use the term "blue" to describe the colour of the sky, he made sure never to inform his daughter that the sky was "blue". The development of her colour perceptions, and especially her insistence in an early age that the clear sky was "white", were reported in Guy Deutscher's 2010 book, Through the Language Glass: Why the World Looks Different in Other Languages.

Deutscher is trilingual in English, German and Hebrew.

== Compositional method, style and aesthetics ==
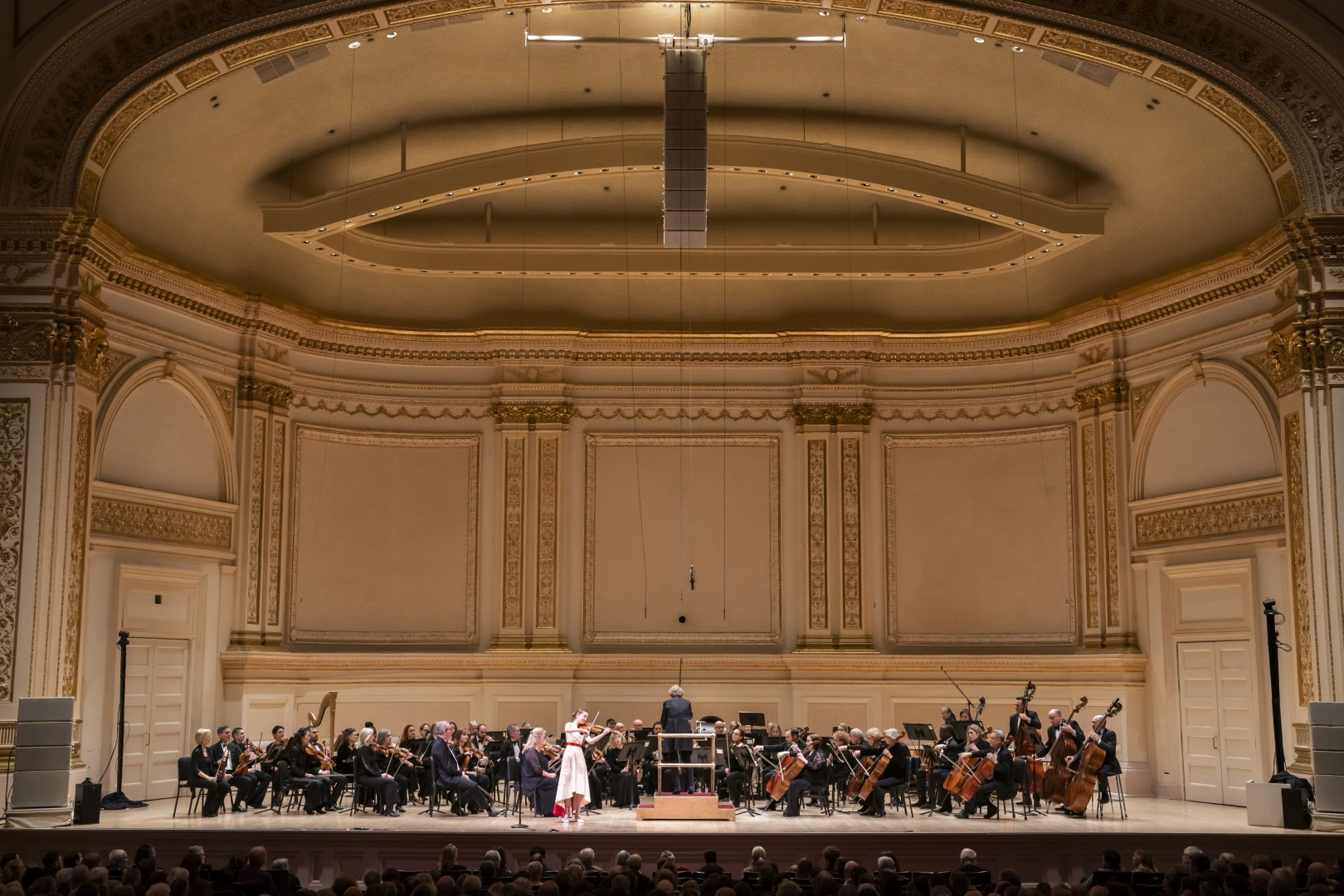
Deutscher performing her violin concerto in Carnegie Hall (December 2019)

Deutscher's music has been noted above all for the wealth and beauty of its melodies. The Austrian Newspaper Wiener Zeitung termed Deutscher a 'Melodist by High Grace', whose cantilenas "convey bottomless grief or overflowing yearning". Deutscher herself explained that her melodies often arrive unbidden, including in her dreams. The opening of her first short opera, The Sweeper of Dreams, came to her fully formed in a dream, as well as the theme of a set of piano variations in E♭ major, which eventually became the basis of the third movement of her piano concerto. Deutscher has also described a special excited state-of-mind, which she called an "improvising mood". She told the Daily Telegraph in 2016, "When I am in an improvising mood, melodies burst from my fingertips." At a younger age she also described melodic inspiration arising from skipping with her 'magical' skipping rope: "I wave it around, and melodies pour into my head". In 2019 she told the New York Times: "When I was younger, I really thought it was the rope that gave me inspiration. Now, I know it's not really the rope, it's the state of mind that I get into when I wave it around".

However, Deutscher has explained in numerous interviews the difference between the spontaneous moments of inspiration, in which she hears melodies in her head, and the laborious process of composing complete polished pieces based on these melodies. To the Financial Times, she said that the challenging part of composition is to develop the ideas and turn them into "a coherent structure. That's extremely difficult".

From a young age, Deutscher has repeatedly stated her determination to compose beautiful music and bring back melody and harmony to modern classical music. In a press conference of the Carinthischer Sommer Music Festival in 2017, which featured Deutscher's violin and piano concertos, she made a public statement about her style, her love of melody, and her musical aesthetics: "Why music should be beautiful". She explained that many people have told her that beautiful melodies are not acceptable in classical music of the twenty-first century, because music must reflect the complexity and ugliness of the modern world. "But I think that these people just got a little bit confused. If the world is so ugly, then what's the point of making it even uglier with ugly music?". She then cited the lullaby by Richard Strauss as her earliest inspiration for creating beauty. In another interview, she explained: "Melody is the essence of music – this is not just my own musical aesthetics, it's the aesthetics of almost everyone, young and old. It's not a great secret that the most loved pieces of music are the ones with the best tunes." She has elaborated on this theme in interviews with The New York Times in 2019 and The Times in 2022, as well as in a speech at the Vienna State Opera in 2019, on the occasion of receiving the European Culture Prize, where she said: "there is more to European Culture than just dissonance. Perhaps there is also a place in European Culture for harmony." In an interview with German Radio after the premiere of her third opera in 2023, Deutscher explained: "So that an art form stays alive and doesn't become a museum of holy relics, you always need something new and fresh. But you need new music which speaks to people, which moves them, which brings them solace, which entertains them".

== Critical reception ==
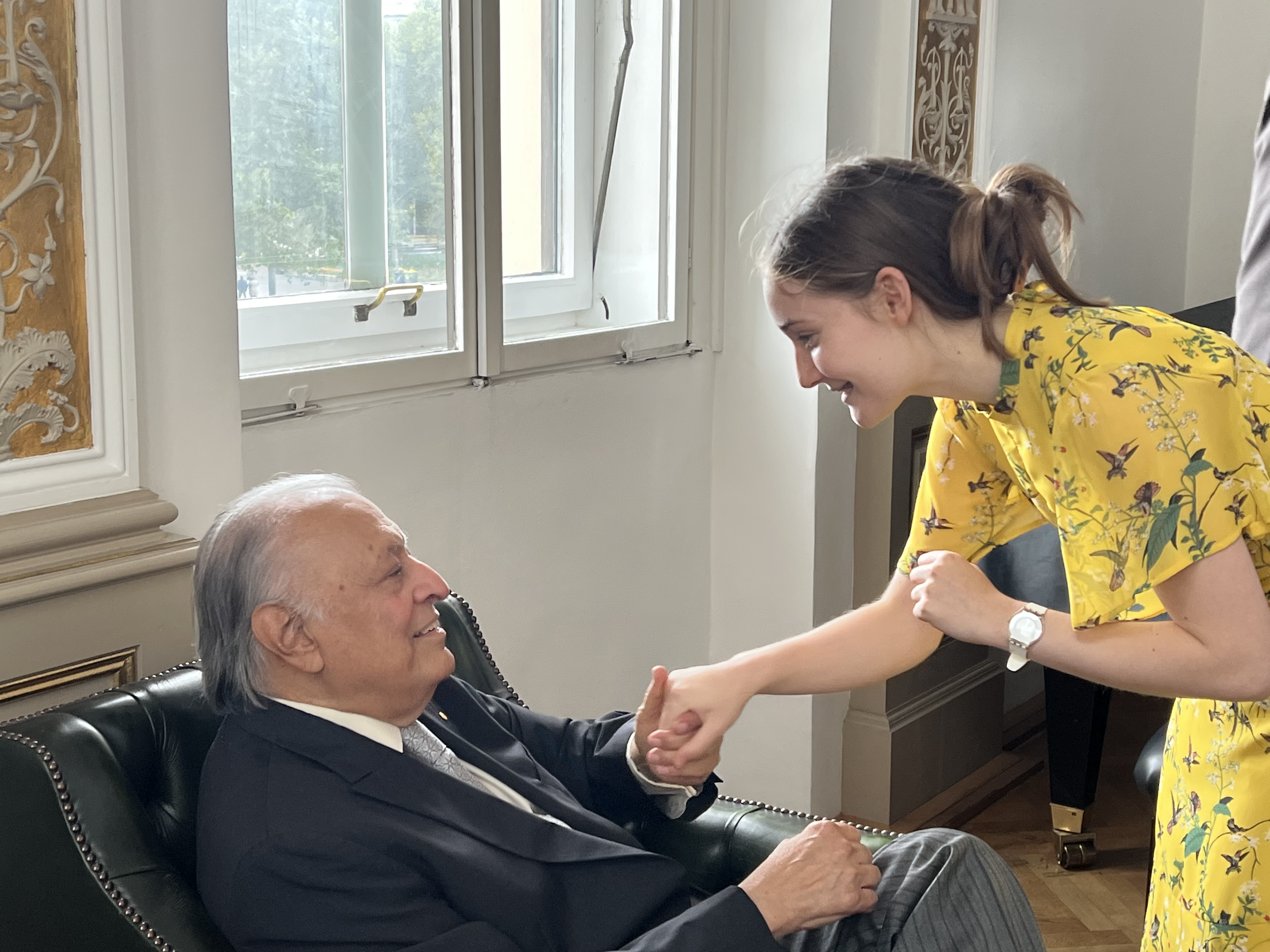
Alma Deutscher and Zubin Mehta (2022)

Much of the response to Deutscher in the first years of her public exposure centred on her young age and status as a child prodigy, with various prominent musicians such as the violinist Anne-Sophie Mutter and conductors Zubin Mehta and Sir Simon Rattle expressing amazement at what she had achieved at such a young age. Rattle told the BBC: "I don't know that I've come across anyone of that age with quite such an astonishing range of gifts."

Deutscher herself, however, always professed her dislike of perception of her as a 'prodigy' and of her young age being the focus of the discussion. She said at the Google Zeitgeist conference when she was 10: "I want my music to be taken seriously ... and sometimes it's a little bit difficult for people to take me seriously because I'm just a little girl." Deutscher also repeatedly objected to the frequent headlines comparing her to Mozart: "I don't really want to be a little Mozart. I want to be Alma."

After the celebrated premiere of Deutscher's opera Cinderella in Vienna in 2016, the focus in the public reception of Deutscher's music has shifted to her unabashed love of melody and to her musical language and aesthetics. The striking quality of Deutscher's melodies was noticed early on. The musicologist Ron Weidberg wrote in 2015 that "few composers can write such tunes, which from the first moment are immediately impressed upon our memory, and thus turn into the possession of all those who listen to them. Alma is one of these composers."

Deutscher's melodies were a major theme in the reception of her opera Cinderella since 2016. The opera was described by one Viennese critic as containing "fireworks of earworms". The Spanish newspaper ABC wrote that "Cinderella is a flood of wonderful and radiant melodies, almost in excess." The German opera magazine Orpheus wrote that Cinderella was heralding the "Renaissance of German Singspiel". The Austrian Newspaper Der Standard expressed the hope that Deutscher's melodious music might help opera reconnect with the wider public and inject a new life into the world of opera, which has so often been pronounced dead.

Deutscher's musical idiom draws on the harmonic framework of 18th and 19th century classical music. Renowned Austrian critic Wilhelm Sinkovicz expressed his astonishment, when reviewing a performance of Deutscher's piano concerto in Vienna, that despite "moving in the Romantic worlds of Mendelssohn and Grieg, Deutscher's music is full of extraordinarily original ideas and genuine surprises." He concluded that it is a misconception that composers must reinvent musical language anew in each generation. "The world turns in a circle", he wrote, "but always sprouts new, beautiful flowers, if one only lets them sprout".

On the other hand, critics who are committed to modernism have criticized Deutscher's refusal to embrace the harshness that characterizes much of classical music since the second half of the twentieth century. An editorial in The Wall Street Journal by Barton Swaim observed that Deutscher's music is perceived as provocative by such critics, who "dislike her music for the same reason audiences love it. They object to its traditional tonality, its straightforward emotional appeal". In May 2022, the Leading Article of The Times endorsed Deutscher's call for beautiful music: "Deutscher seeks audiences rather than disciples. She is surely right to hold that the surest way to introduce her generation to the joys of classical music is to provide something beautiful".

== Operas ==
=== The Sweeper of Dreams (2012) ===
Deutscher's first completed opera, from age seven, is a short work inspired by Neil Gaiman's story, "The Sweeper of Dreams", with the text adapted from a libretto by Elizabeth Adlington. Parts of the score came to Deutscher in a dream. The first performance of the opera was in Israel in 2013. In the story, a job is advertised for a Sweeper of Dreams, who is to help people forget their nightmares. The three middle-aged men on the committee are shocked to discover that the only candidate, Alex, is a sixteen-year-old girl. Her interviewers mock her, because she "committed two terrible crimes: the first was being a child, the second was being female".

The theme of female empowerment is recurrent in Deutscher's operas, and also dominates her full length opera, Cinderella. She told The New York Times in 2019: "I'm a very strong feminist and I'm really happy that I was born now, when girls are allowed to develop their talents." She said she is particularly attracted to stories of women overcoming adversity.

=== Cinderella (2015–20) ===
Deutscher's first opera is a full-length work based on the fairy tale of Cinderella, but with significant modifications to the plot, which in her version revolves around music: Cinderella herself is a composer, the prince is a poet, and a haunting melody that Cinderella sings to the prince as she flees from the ball takes the place of the glass slipper of the traditional tale. Deutscher explained that it was important for her that Cinderella is not just a pretty girl with a dainty foot. The prince falls in love with Cinderella because of her talent.

Deutscher has worked on the opera over a period of at least five years, between the ages of nine and fifteen, producing successive expansions and revisions. The first (chamber) version was premiered in Israel in 2015, when Deutscher was ten. An orchestral version premiered in Vienna the following year, with conductor Zubin Mehta as patron of the production. Reports about the sold-out performances appeared in newspapers all over the world, and Viennese critics expressed their astonishment at the accomplishment of Deutscher's orchestral writing and at the beauty of her melodies.

Deutscher further elaborated the work for the sold-out U.S. premiere in 2017 at Opera San Jose. The New Criterion called it an "opera of astounding wit, craft, and musical beauty... The sheer amount of orchestral and vocal invention is stunning", and predicted that Cinderella would find its way to Broadway. Opera Today described it as "a young talent's sensational burst to prominence... a once-in-a-lifetime opera-going event that had audiences standing and cheering."

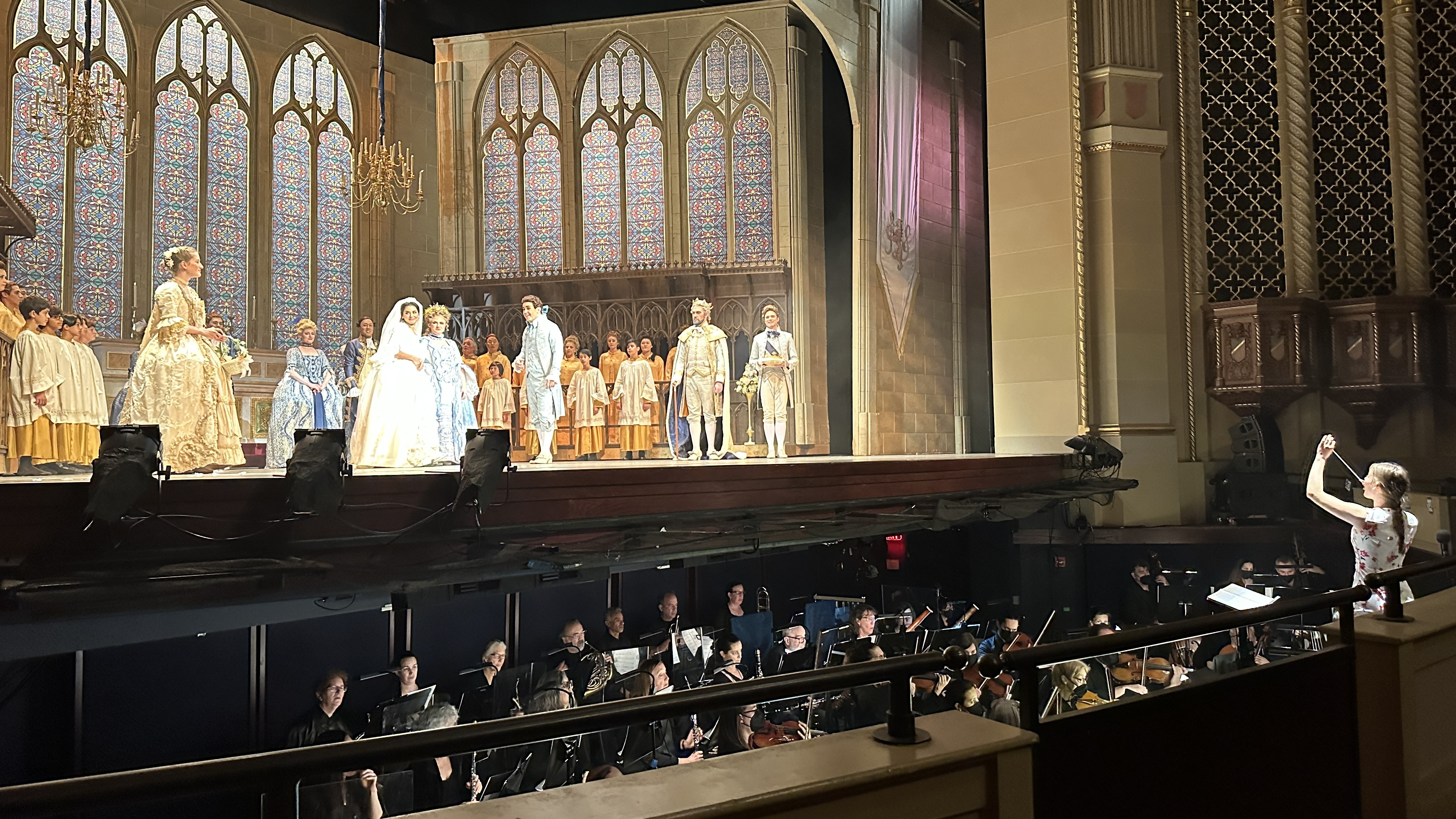
Alma Deutscher conducts her opera Cinderella in Opera San Jose, 2022

The Vienna State Opera staged its own adaptation for children in 2018, and 2020.

In 2019–20 Deutscher undertook a further revision of the opera for a production at the Salzburg State Theatre, adding a children's chorus.

In 2022 Deutscher made her U.S. debut as conductor, in a revival of the 2017 Opera San Jose production of Cinderella. The production was released on YouTube in 2023.

=== The Emperor's New Waltz (2023) ===
Deutscher's second full-length opera, "The Emperor's New Waltz" (German: Des Kaisers neue Walzer), was a commission of the Salzburg State Theatre and premiered there in March 2023. In interviews with the BBC and with German KlassikRadio, Deutscher explained the main themes and inspirations for this musical comedy: "First of all, I wanted to tell a beautiful love story, between two young people, but also between two musical worlds: classical music and pop music. Then I wanted to write a musical comedy that isn't only for opera fans, but also appeals to young people who otherwise have no access to classical music. And finally I wanted to parody the tuneless world of atonal contemporary classical music – music that only "clever people understand" – and to the rest of us just sounds like noise".

Deutscher said that she wanted to move away from the rigidity of the opera genre in this musical comedy: "My hero Jonas is a pop singer, he sings songs on the guitar, he raps over Mozart. But at the end he also sings in a ten-part fugue. I wanted to show that opera and musicals are much closer than one thinks. My dream is that young people go to a musical, but then think: "Actually, there was also opera in it and it didn't hurt at all, it was even beautiful..."

The Salzburg State Theatre describes the plot as follows: "Mozart versus modern beats, shrill dissonance against harmonic beauty. Inspired by the fairy tale "The Emperor's New Clothes," the opera tells a story about pretence and truth and about the bonding power of music. The gardener and the rich heiress: Jonas and Leonie could hardly be more different. No wonder that the two can't stand each other. What unites them, however, is the dream of studying at the music academy. But Leonie's father, fashion mogul Rudolf Kaiser, thinks that her planned marriage to the renowned contemporary composer Anthony Swindelle will bring enough high culture into the family. Leonie decides to visit the university disguised as a boy, and comes across Jonas there. Together they discover that Swindelle is pursuing some self-serving plans."

== Awards and distinctions ==
- In May 2021, Deutscher received the Leonardo da Vinci International Award of 11 European Rotary Clubs. At age 16, she was the youngest person in the history of the prize ever to receive it.
- In October 2019, Deutscher was awarded the European Culture Prize (Young Generation Award) in a ceremony at the Vienna State Opera.
- In October 2019, Deutscher received the Beijing Music Festival Young Artist Award in a ceremony in Beijing.
- In September 2019, Deutscher was chosen by the German magazine Stern as one of its twelve "Heroes of Tomorrow". At 14, she was the youngest of the twelve to be chosen, with the other eleven ranging in age from 27 to 43.

== Notable performances, recordings and publications ==
Deutscher has played her own music as soloist with renowned orchestras across the world, including the Israel Philharmonic Orchestra, Vienna Radio Symphony Orchestra, Mozarteum Orchestra Salzburg, Vienna Chamber Orchestra, Royal Philharmonic Orchestra, Shenzhen Symphony Orchestra (China), Lucerne Symphony Orchestra (Switzerland), Vancouver Symphony Orchestra, Orchestra of St. Luke's (New York). She has also given recitals of her own compositions in the renowned Lucerne Festival (Switzerland) and Aix-en-Provence Festival (France). At the invitation of the Austrian Chancellor, she has performed at the Chancellery in Vienna on several state occasions, including in 2018 at a service commemorating the end of the Second World War in Europe.

Notable live performances include:

- Deutscher's performance aged 10 at the Google Zeitgeist Conference in 2015, where she appeared alongside physicist Stephen Hawking.
- The opening concert of the Carinthischer Sommer (Carinthian Summer) Music Festival (Austria) in 2017, in which Deutscher performed as soloist both her own violin concerto and the world-premiere of her piano concerto, together with the Vienna Chamber Orchestra.
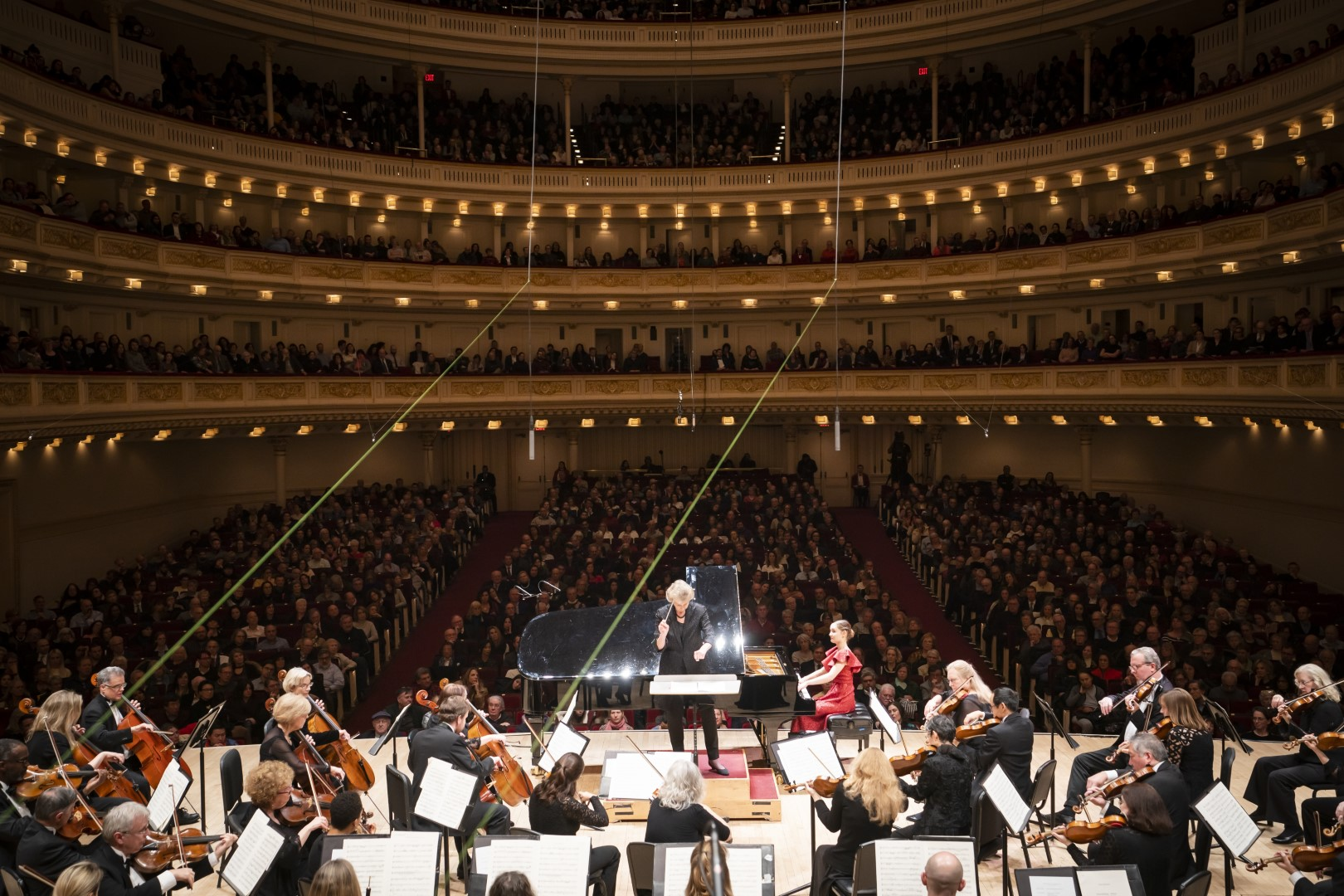
- Alma Deutscher performing her piano concerto in Carnegie Hall, 2019
  Deutscher's sold out Debut in Carnegie Hall in New York in 2019. This concert, which received multiple standing ovations and which critics described as "a night of increasing musical wonder", was conducted by Dame Jane Glover with the Orchestra of St. Luke's, and was devoted exclusively to Deutscher's own compositions. It included her Violin concerto and Piano Concerto, both of which she again performed as a soloist, as well as highlights from her opera Cinderella and her concert waltz, Waltz of the Sirens. Deutscher introduced her waltz to the audience by explaining her musical philosophy and her determination to bring back harmony and beauty to modern classical music, and to find beauty even in the ugly sounds of the modern world. The event was streamed live by Medici.TV. A recording of the Waltz of the Sirens from the concert has been watched more than 2.4 million times on YouTube. A later short excerpt of Deutscher herself conducting her Waltz of the Sirens went viral on TikTok in May 2022.

Notable television appearances:

- In 2017 Deutscher was the subject of an hour long BBC documentary directed by Alan Yentob. The documentary accompanied Alma Deutscher during the rehearsals for the premiere of her opera Cinderella in Vienna in 2016.
- In 2017 Deutscher was also the subject of a CBS-60 Minutes documentary, which won an Emmy Award in 2018 for best "Arts, Culture, and Entertainment Report".
- Aged 9, Deutscher appeared on the program Intermezzo With Arik of the renowned pianist and pedagogue Arie Vardi on Israeli Educational Television, in a performance and interview which brought her to the attention of conductor Zubin Mehta.

Deutscher has appeared on television shows across the world, including The Ellen DeGeneres Show, and NBC Today.

The first album of Deutscher's music, "The Music of Alma Deutscher" was released in 2013 when she was 8. In 2019, Sony Classical Records released "From My Book of Melodies", a piano album of Deutscher's compositions from ages of four to fourteen. Two productions of her opera Cinderella has been released on DVD, by Sony Classical and by the Vienna State Opera.

Deutscher's collection of piano pieces, From My Book of Melodies, was published in 2020 by American classical music publishers G. Schirmer and Hal Leonard.

== List of compositions ==
=== Ballets ===
- The Euterpides, premiered in 2025.

=== Operas ===
- The Sweeper of Dreams (mini-opera, composed age 7, 2012)
- Cinderella, a full-length opera (written aged 10, and revived multiple times in subsequent years)
- The Emperor's New Waltz, an opera commissioned by the Salzburg State Theatre, premiered in 2023.

=== Orchestral pieces ===
- Dance of the Solent Mermaids (symphonic dance)
- Violin Concerto in G minor
- Piano Concerto in E♭ major
- Waltz of the Sirens
- Elmayer Waltz
- Grinzinger Polka
- Breaking News Polka
- Fantasia on Japanese Songs (2025)

=== Songs ===
- The Lonely Pine Tree, song to words by H. Heine. (This piece appeared in public only in a piano solo arrangement, as part of the album From My Book of Melodies)
- The Night Before Christmas, (song to words by C. Moore)
- Near the Beloved, a song to words by Goethe
- I Heard the Bells on Christmas Day, a Christmas Carol to words based on a poem by Henry Wadsworth Longfellow

=== Chamber music ===
- Andante for Violin and piano
- Rondino (trio) in E♭ major for violin, viola, and piano
- Quartet movement in A major (a piano arrangement appeared in the album From My Book of Melodies under the name Summer in Mondsee)
- Viola Sonata in C minor (first movement)
- Quartet movement in G major, Rondo
- Violin Sonata (first movement)
- Trio for violin, viola, and piano in D major (Cinderella Trio)

=== Piano pieces ===
- Piano Sonata no. 1 in E♭ major (Composed: Oct. 2011, Premiered: Dec 4, 2011)
- The Chase (Impromptu in C minor)
- Sixty Minutes Polka
- Ludwig Waltz no. 1
- Ludwig Waltz no. 2
- Piano Sonata no. 2 in E-minor
- Impromptu in D-major "Sea and Mountains"

=== Educational music ===
- "Alma's Piano Songs: an Album for Young Musicians" (A collection of piano pieces for children by Alma Deutscher).

== Discography ==
Title	Album details
The Music of Alma Deutscher	Released: 2013; Label: Flara Records; Formats: CD, digital download
Cinderella (Opera) – 2017 Production of Opera San José	Released: 2018; Label: Sony Classical; Formats: DVD, Blu-ray
Cinderella (Opera) – 2018 Vienna State Opera's Children's Version	Released: 2019; Label: Belvedere; Formats: DVD
From My Book of Melodies	Released: Nov 2019; Label: Sony Classical; Formats: CD, digital download

== Publications ==
- From My Book of Melodies. Collection of Piano Pieces, G. Schirmer 2020, ISBN 978-1-7051-3098-8
- Alma's Piano Songs. An Album for Young Pianists. Flara Music 2022, ISBN 978-3-903454-01-9
- Cinderella (Vocal Score). Flara Music 2022, ISBN 978-3-903454-03-3
- Violin Concerto in G minor (Vocal Score). Universal Edition 2024, UES106822-410.
- Waltz of the Sirens (Score). Universal Edition 2024, UES107039-000.
- Two Childhood Trios. Universal Edition 2024, UES107074-410.
