= Guy Deutscher (linguist) =

Israeli linguist

- גיא דויטשר
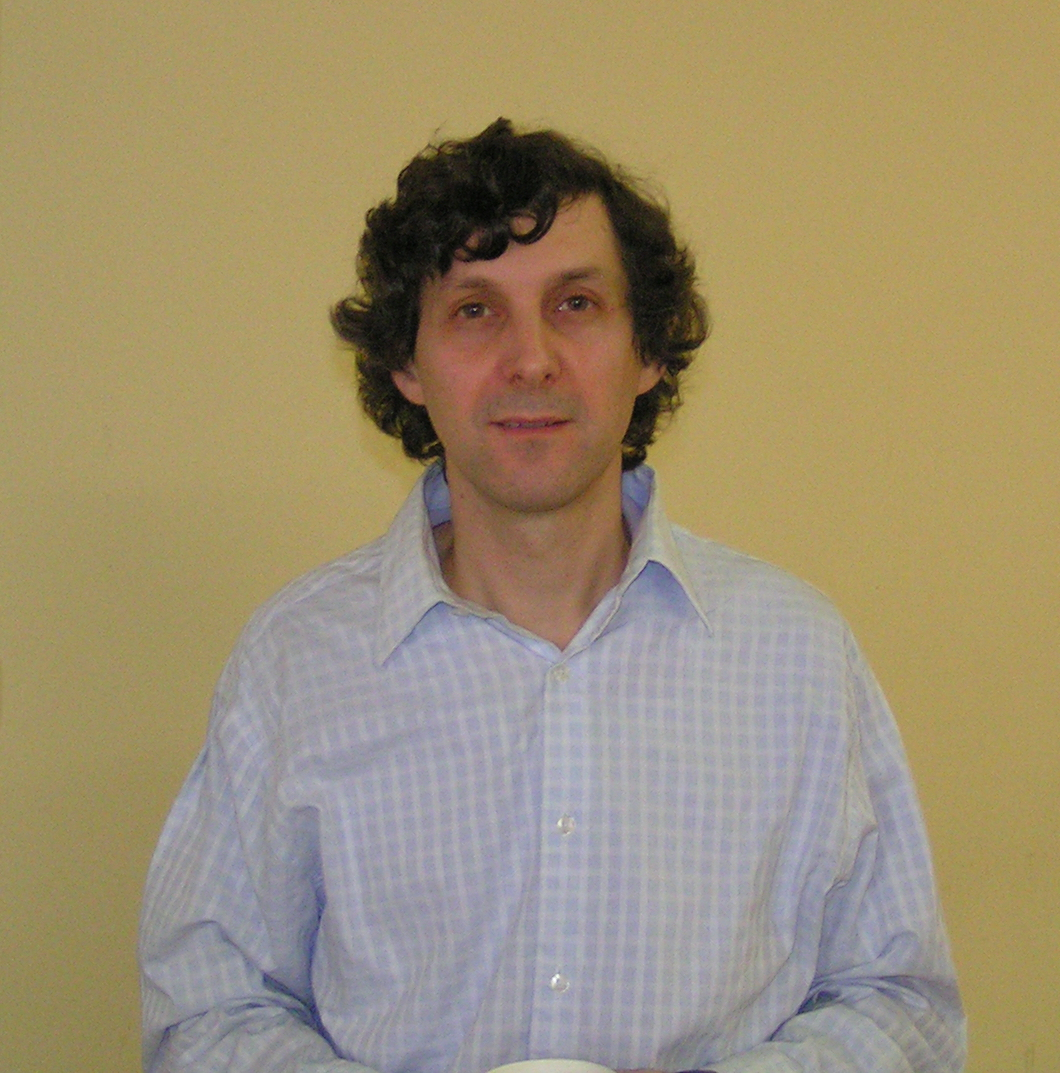
- Born: 1969 (age 56–57); Tel Aviv, Israel
- Education: University of Cambridge (BA, PhD)
- Occupation: Linguist
- Spouse: Janie Steen
- Children: 2, including Alma
- Scientific career
- Fields: Linguistics
- Website: www.guydeutscher.com

Guy Deutscher (Hebrew: גיא דויטשר; born 1969) is an Israeli linguist.

== Career ==
Deutscher is an honorary research fellow at the University of Manchester and was a professor in the department of languages and cultures of Ancient Mesopotamia at the University of Leiden in the Netherlands. He received an undergraduate degree in mathematics at University of Cambridge, before going on to earn a Ph.D. in linguistics there. After that he undertook research in historical linguistics at St John's College, Cambridge.

Deutscher is the father of Alma Deutscher, a former child prodigy composer and musician.

== Awards and honours ==
- 2011 Royal Society Prizes for Science Books, shortlist, Through the Language Glass

== Selected works ==
=== Books ===
- Deutscher, Guy (2000). Syntactic Change in Akkadian: the evolution of sentential complementation. Oxford, UK: Oxford University Press. ISBN 978-0-19-829988-2. OCLC 875571581.
- ——— (2005). The Unfolding of Language: an evolutionary tour of mankind's greatest invention. New York: Metropolitan Books. ISBN 978-0-8050-7907-4. OCLC 57311730.
- ——— (2010). Through the Language Glass: why the world looks different in other languages. New York: Henry Holt and Company. ISBN 978-0-8050-8195-4. OCLC 727479951.

=== Edited by ===
- ———; Kouwenberg, N. J. C., eds. (2006). The Akkadian language in its Semitic context: studies in the Akkadian of the third and second millennium BC. Uitgaven van het Nederlands Instituut voor het Nabije Oosten te Leiden. Vol. 106. Leiden: Nederlands Instituut voor het Nabije Oosten. ISBN 978-90-6258-317-1. OCLC 70064010.
