= Khera Dabar =

Coordinates: 28°34′58″N 76°56′12″E

- Village
- Khera Dabar
- Interactive map of Khera Dabar
- Country: India
- Union Territory: Delhi
- District: South West Delhi

Population
  - Total: 6,881
  - Density: 1,879/km^{2} (4,870/sq mi)

Languages
  - Official: Hindi
- Time zone: IST
- Delhi Legislative Assembly constituency: Matiala
- Parliamentary constituency: West Delhi

Khera Dabar is a village located in Najafgarh tehsil, in South West Delhi, Delhi.

== Notability ==
Chaudhary Brahm Prakash Ayurved Charak Sansthan is situated in this village that is Asia's largest ayurvedic hospital.

== Transport ==
BUS NO.-826

It can be reached by BUS ROUTE NO.826 runs between Tilak Nagar- Ch. Brahm Prakash Ayurvedic hospital, khera Dabar via Uttam Nagar, Dwarka Mor, Najafgarh.

== Pincode ==
Pincode of Kheda Dabar (or Khera Dabar) : 110073
