= Khori Dastoor =

American operatic soprano and arts executive (born 1980)

- Born: September 26, 1980 (age 45); Pasadena, California
- Occupations: Opera singer (soprano); opera administrator

Khorshed Dastoor, better known as Khori Dastoor, (born September 26, 1980) is an American arts executive. She is the general director and CEO of Houston Grand Opera (2021–present) and the former general director of Opera San José (2019–2021).

Dastoor has dedicated her career as an arts leader to initiatives surrounding innovation, accessibility, diversity, talent incubation, and fundraising.

== Early life and education ==
Dastoor was raised in Pasadena, California. She holds a bachelor's degree from the New England Conservatory of Music and a master's degree from University of California, Los Angeles (UCLA), where she was the recipient of the Dean's Award for the School of Arts and Architecture. While studying at UCLA she served as a teaching artist with the Education Department at Los Angeles Opera.

== Career ==
Dastoor pursued a career as an operatic soprano before transitioning to a career in arts administration starting in foundation funding at the Packard Humanities Institute, before moving into opera leadership at Opera San José and Houston Grand Opera.

=== Houston Grand Opera ===
The Houston Grand Opera (HGO) board of directors announced Dastoor's appointment as general director and CEO of the company in June 2021. Dastoor is the fourth general director and first CEO in the history of the company.

Prior to Dastoor's appointment, HGO was led by artistic and music director Patrick Summers and managing director Perryn Leech. In 2020 Leech departed for a new position as general director of Canadian Opera Company, at which time the HGO board of directors and leadership decided to return to a single general director/CEO. Dastoor assumed leadership of HGO in August 2021 and moved to Houston full time in December 2021. Summers continues to serve as HGO's artistic and music director.

Dastoor's belief that every member of Houston's diverse international community deserves access to great art and culture has defined her core priorities for HGO. These include presenting world-class productions and original new works grounded in Houston; cultivating the talents of promising emerging artists from across the globe; and increasing diversity on the stage, in the audience, and within the organization.

During her first full season with the company, in 2021/22, Dastoor oversaw the expansion of online art-sharing initiative HGO Digital to include the first livestream of a company world premiere, Joel Thompson's The Snowy Day, for viewers in 35 countries. In June 2022, Dastoor announced the appointment of Thompson as the first full-time composer-in-residence in the company's history.

Under her leadership, HGO produced a new mainstage production of Ethel Smyth's 1906 opera The Wreckers for the company's 2022/23 season. This marked the first staging by a professional American opera company of the composer's often overlooked masterpiece.

In February 2023, Dastoor announced that HGO had received the largest gift in its history from Sarah and Ernest Butler. The gift created a new fund within the HGO Endowment valued at $22 million, and the HGO Studio program for emerging artists was renamed the Sarah and Ernest Butler Houston Grand Opera Studio.

In March 2023, Dastoor announced HGO's 2023/24 season and its opening production of the mainstage world-premiere of Intelligence, the company's 75th commissioned opera. Created by composer Jake Heggie, librettist Gene Scheer, and director/choreographer Jawole Willa Jo Zollar, the new opera shares the story of a women-run pro-Union spy ring during the Civil War.

=== Opera San José ===
In the spring of 2019, the Opera San José's (OSJ) board of directors announced the appointment of Dastoor as the company's third general director. She assumed the position in the fall of 2019, overseeing all aspects of artistic planning and business operations.

The COVID-19 pandemic hit soon after Dastoor took over leadership at OSJ, forcing the cancelation of the final production of the 2019/20 season. In response to the pandemic, Dastoor quickly launched the Opera San José Artist and Musicians Relief Fund, one of the nation's first initiatives of its kind.

In June 2020, Dastoor founded the company's Heiman Digital Media Studio, a state-of-the-art performance/film space that enables the company to capture and stream high-quality, fully produced operatic performances. Its first offering was Robert Schumann's Dichterliebe (A Poet's Love) song cycle, which was offered with Spanish and Vietnamese translations, in addition to English, welcoming two of San Jose's largest communities to experience its local art.

In August 2020, Opera San José announced that its 2020/21 resident artists would quarantine together, allowing them to continue creating work to be shared virtually, performing in concerts, recitals, conversations, and fully produced operas created specifically for digital broadcast, as well as educational programming for youths and adults. On December 3, 2020, OSJ released for on-demand-streaming, a new digital production of Jake Heggie's chamber opera Three Decembers featuring renowned mezzo-soprano Susan Graham and OSJ resident artists.

During the fall of 2021, after the announcement of her new position at Houston Grand Opera, Dastoor split her time between OSJ and HGO. In November 2021, OSJ made a return to live performance with a critically acclaimed new production of Purcell's Dido and Aeneas.

=== Early administrative career ===
In 2013 Dastoor was named artistic advisor to Opera San José under founder Irene Dalis, and in 2015 she became director of artistic planning under general director Larry Hancock.

Concurrently, Dastoor served as a member of foundation leadership at the Packard Humanities Institute (PHI), which funds initiatives encompassing arts, music, and archaeology. In this capacity she worked closely with PHI's president and various grantee organizations on a wide range of collaborative projects involving performance, historical conservation, and digital musicology.

=== Opera career ===
Dastoor, a retired operatic soprano, first worked with Opera San José as a member of the company's residence ensemble of principal artists, hired by company founder Irene Dalis.

As an opera singer, Dastoor enjoyed a career performing throughout the U.S., Europe, and Asia, with credits at companies including LA Opera, Lucerne Opera, Lake George Opera, and the Oregon Shakespeare Festival.

Dastoor's operatic repertoire included such roles as Gilda (Rigoletto), Pamina (The Magic Flute), Sophie (Werther), Adina (L'elisir d'amore), Despina (Così fan tutte), Susanna (The Marriage of Figaro), Micaëla (Carmen), Clorinda (La Cenerentola), Manon (Manon), Miss Wordsworth (Albert Herring), Gabrielle (La Vie parisienne), Mabel (The Pirates of Penzance), Lauretta (Gianni Schicchi), Lakmé (Lakmé), Gretel (Hansel and Gretel), Oscar (Un ballo in maschera), Lucia (Lucia di Lammermoor), and Cunegonde (Candide).

Dastoor's contemporary repertoire included such premier roles as La Novia in Lorca, Child of the Moon and Mary in the world premiere of Paul Chihara's Magnificat.

== Affiliations ==
Khori Dastoor currently serves on the board of directors for Opera America, where she is the Co-Chair of the Learning and Leadership Council and a founding member and mentor for the mentorship program for Opera Leaders of Color.

She assists with industry efforts to identify young talent as a judge for the Richard Tucker Awards and the Metropolitan Opera National Council Auditions, and she advocates for artists as a board member of the Symphony, Opera and Ballet Employers Electronic Media Association.

== Personal life ==
Dastoor's parents both emigrated to the U.S. Her father is an Indian Parsis, a Zoroastrian ethno-religious group of Persian descent. Her surname is a term for a Zoroastrian high priest, and her legal first name is Khorshed meaning the "radiant sun". Her mother is from Indonesia via Holland. She credits her parents for instilling within her a love for classical music. As a child growing up in Pasadena, Dastoor performed with the Los Angeles Children's Chorus. She and her husband are the parents of two daughters.
