= Sundroj =

- village
- Location in Rewari, Haryana, India Sundroj (India)
- Coordinates: 28°19′N 76°54′E
- Country: India
- State: Haryana
- District: Rewari

Languages
  - Official: Hindi
- Time zone: UTC+5:30 (IST)
- PIN: 123101
- ISO 3166 code: IN-HR
- Vehicle registration: HR36
- Nearest city: Rewari
- Sex ratio: 1:1 ♂/♀
- Literacy: 100%
- Website: www.rewari.gov.in

Sundroj is a village in Khol Block of Rewari Tehsil, Rewari district, Gurgaon division, Haryana, India. It is 9 kilometres (5.6 mi) west of Rewari on the Rewari-Narnaul road. Its 332 kilometres (206 mi) of the State capital, Chandigarh. Its postal head office is at Khori.
