= Kharkhari, Rajshahi =

Suburban borough in Rajshahi Division, Bangladesh

Coordinates: 24.3952°N 88.6487°E

Kharkhari or Khorkhori, also called Lalitaher, is a small suburban borough of Boalia Thana, Rajshahi Division, Bangladesh. It is located between the boroughs of Balanagar and Meher Chandi, about 7 km to the northeast of the Rajshahi city center, and 7 km north of the Patma River, and just south of the Rajshahi Bypass Road. It consist mostly of small poor residential and commercial buildings in the vicinity of the Rajshahi-Mohonganj Road (Z6010). It is home to a high school, a mosque, and to the Shah Mokhdum Medical College And Hospital.
