= Khaira, Delhi =

Indian urban village

Khaira
- Neighborhood of Delhi
- Country: India
- State: Delhi

Languages
  - Official: Hindi
- Time zone: UTC+5:30 (IST)

Khaira is an Ahir-dominated urban village inhabited by people belonging to Lamba and Aphariya gotra, located on Shaheed Rao Laxmi Chand Marg (the road well known as Main Khaira Road) in Najafgarh tehsil of South West Delhi, Delhi. This village was established in 1612 by Roopram [Father of Dada Mayaram Sadh]; he came from Achina village [Charki dadri, Haryana].

The village is a part of Surheda Seventeen Village Panchayat. (Surheda khap)

== Geography ==
The village consists of six Mohallas (PANNA):

- Swami/Bairagi Mohalla (Guru's and founder of Village called "Maharaj")
- Kanyawada Panna (Lamba Patti.)
- Bagdi Panna
- Sadhwada Panna (People of this panna follows the preachings of Dada Sadh and thus do not eat Onions, Garlic, Tobacco etc at their homes)
- Afria Panna (Afria Panna is near Dadi Khimmi Mandir )
- Kabir Colony (Panna).

== Schools and colleges ==
- G.G.S.S School Khaira/G.B.S.S School Khaira
- South Delhi Municipal Corporation Primary School for Girls Khaira
- South Delhi Municipal Corporation Primary Co-ed School Khaira
- Jawahar Navodaya Vidyalaya Jaffarpur Kalan, approx 7 km from Khaira Village
- Ch. Brahm Prakash Government Engineering College, approx 7 km from Khaira Village
- Ch. Brahm Prakash industrial training institute Jaffarpur Kalan, approx 7 km from Khaira Village
- Bhagini Nivedita Women College, KAIR village and about 5 km from Khaira village
- Integral model school in Khaira village
- BRMT college of Education

== Government Hospitals ==
- South Delhi Municipal Corporation Unani Dispensary Kahira.
- Rural Health Training Center Najafgarh approx 2.5 km from Khaira Village
- Rao Tula Ram Memorial Hospital, Jafarpur Kalan Village approx. 7 km from Khaira Village
- Chaudhary Brahm Prakash Ayurved Charak Sansthan, Khera Dabur Village Najafgarh New Delhi-110043
- ESIC Dispensary, Najafgarh approx 1.5 km from Khaira Village.

== Markets ==
The nearest market is the main Najafgarh market.

== Transport ==
- Delhi Transport Corporation
- The nearest Delhi Metro station is Dhansa Bus Stand, Najafgarh.

== Banks ==
- Union Bank Of India
- Indian Bank

== Holy Places ==
- Dada Sadh Mandir (Onions and garlic are not grown in the land around this area)
- Dadi Khimmi Mandir
- Radha Krishan Mandir near Dadi Khimmi Mandir
- Shiv ji, Hanuman ji and Shani Dev Mandir
- Very Popular and ancient Mandir of Goddess Dadi Bai ji
- Dada Bhaiya Mandir (Dada Khera)
- Mata Mandir
- Dada Ghoruwala Mandir
- Dada Badri Mandir
- Kabir Mandir.
