= Chaudhary Brahm Prakash Ayurved Charak Sansthan =

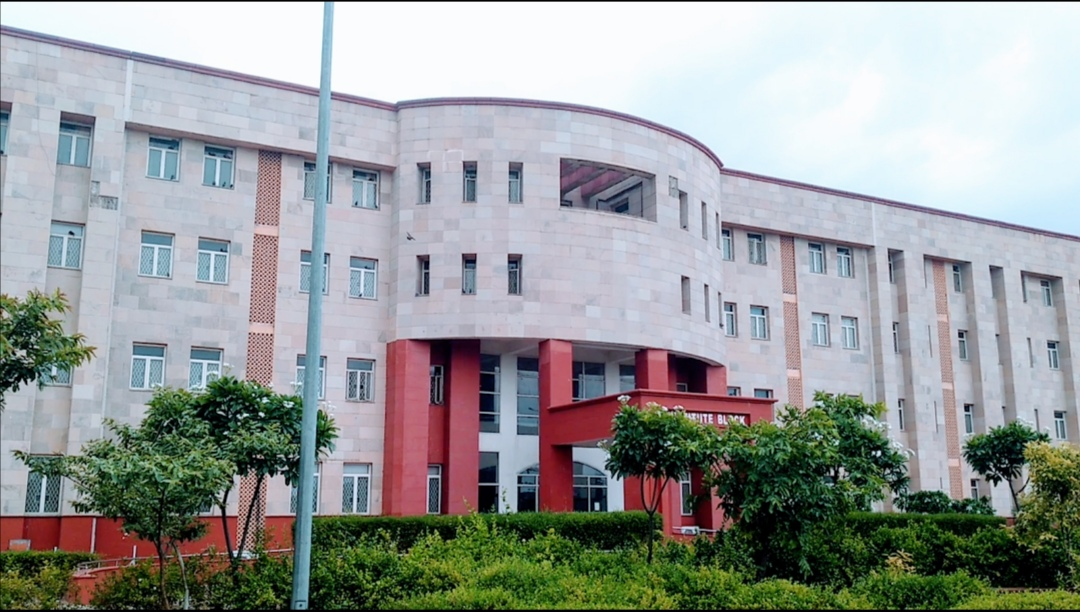

Geography
- Location: CBPACS Road, Khera Dabar, Najafgarh, New Delhi, India

Organisation
- Affiliated university: Guru Gobind Singh Indraprastha University

Services
- Emergency department: yes
- Beds: 210

Links
- Website: https://cbpacs.com/

Chaudhary Brahm Prakash Ayurved Charak Sansthan an autonomous institution under GNCTD is an Ayurvedic college & hospital located in Village Khera Dabar New Delhi, India. The Sansthan is named in the honor of Delhi's first chief minister Chaudhary Brahm Prakash. Presently the institute has 100 BAMS seats and 51 Post-graduation seats.Among These 50% For AIQ and 50% For Institutional Quota. It is Asia's largest Ayurvedic hospital.
