= Irene Dalis =

American opera singer (1925–2014)

- Born: Yvonne Patricia Dalis; October 8, 1925; San Jose, California, US
- Died: December 14, 2014 (aged 89) San Jose, California
- Genre: Opera
- Occupation: Singer
- Instrument: Vocals

Irene Dalis (born Yvonne Patricia Dalis; October 8, 1925 – December 14, 2014) was an American mezzo-soprano singer, who had a long international career at the highest levels of world opera. In 1946, she received her bachelor's degree from San Jose State College (now San José State University), where she regarded herself not as a singer, but as a pianist.

== Education and early career ==
Of Greek and Italian descent, Dalis grew up in San Jose, California. Dalis received her bachelor's degree from San Jose State College (now San José State University) and master's degree in music education from Teachers College of Columbia University, and she received honorary doctorates from Santa Clara University and San Jose State University.

Dalis was awarded a Fulbright scholarship and went to Europe to begin her singing career. She studied in Milan and gave her first performance of any kind at the Oldenburgisches Stadttheater in Germany. This was so successful that she was offered a contract in Oldenburg and remained there for two years between 1953 and 1955, making her professional debut there in 1953 as Princess Eboli in Verdi's Don Carlo. She then moved to the Berlin's Städtische Oper where her performance in Janáček's Jenufa led to an offer from The Metropolitan Opera, where she debuted in 1957, again as Eboli, to great applause.

One New York City reviewer, Raymond Erickson, wrote:

Her expert vocalism and musicianship were immediately apparent in the "Veil Song", which Dalis sang better than I have ever heard it sung. In the tricky ensemble with Carlo and Rodrigo in the Queen's gardens, she was just as impressive, and her sweeping, almost torrential handling of O don fatale won her a genuine ovation from the capacity audience. Everywhere, Dalis' acting went hand-in-glove with her singing. Erickson concluded that Dalis's debut was "one of the most exciting in recent seasons"

That was the first of 274 performances with the Met, over 20 seasons. She was particularly noted as Amneris in Verdi's Aïda, a part she sang 69 times at the Metropolitan. She was Brangäne when Birgit Nilsson sang first at the Met in Wagner's Tristan und Isolde in 1959, Amneris when Leontyne Price debuted in Aïda at the house in 1961 and Princess di Bouillon for Plácido Domingo's Met debut in Adriana Lecouvreur. She also performed with soprano Leonie Rysanek frequently, most notably 17 performances of Die Frau ohne Schatten by Richard Strauss, as well as in Salome and Aida.

== Career highlights ==
In 1961, Dalis appeared as the first American to sing the major role of Kundry in Wagner's Parsifal at the Bayreuth Festival. Her portrayal of this role was recorded in 1962 with Jess Thomas as Parsifal, Hans Hotter as Gurnemanz, and Hans Knappertsbusch conducting. This recording won the Grand Prix du Disc in 1964. In San Francisco, she sang the Nurse in Die Frau ohne Schatten. and Ortrud in Lohengrin, among other roles. She performed in the gala to mark the conclusion of the career of Sir Rudolf Bing

== Critical appreciation ==
One reviewer said of her portrayal of Kundry:

Her broadcast portrayal is made memorable by the sensuous quality of her middle and upper voice…. she startles with the sheer beauty of her voice and her interpretive subtlety. The luscious timbre, with its seductive shimmer, contains its own magic...Her flexible phrasing and command of text bespeak a singer who inhabits her character to the fullest, achieving a fusion of musical and dramatic elements...Dalis owns a singular combination of vocal and interpretive gifts.

The eminent Birgit Nilsson said of her collegial intelligence:

Irene Dalis was wonderful to interact with: active, alert, but at the same time solicitous, as Isolde’s servant must be. I have had colleagues who ceaselessly tried to convince the audience that they should be the one singing Isolde. Then everything goes wrong and nothing in the relationship works. But here, everything ran perfectly.

Fan appreciation also runs deep. Her home burned down in 1990 and she lost a lifetime's collection of recordings and memorabilia. Unbeknownst to her, a former student quietly reassembled unauthorized recordings of her performances at the Met, San Francisco, Rome, and Bayreuth, and gave them to her as a gift.

== Founding and directing Opera San Jose ==
After retiring from the Met in 1977, Dalis returned to her hometown in California, where San Jose State University offered her the position of Professor of Music. There she developed the Opera Workshop program, which began turning out so many career-level graduate singers that she and her friend, former San Francisco mezzo-soprano Walda Bradley, decided to form Opera San Jose in 1984, a professional company which hires young singers on a renewable year-long contract basis, allowing them to perform principal roles in the company's four annual productions. "This company was based on my two years in Oldenburg," Dalis says. "In my time there, I sang nine major roles—it would have been 10 but I had appendicitis! And I thought, 'Why not find young talent and have them sing the big roles, rather than starting in the chorus and working their way up?'" As its chief officer, she led the company for the rest of her life, taking particular pride in its fiscal stability.

Her idea of creating the first company in America to use the fest system (year-long contracts promising major roles) also brought great satisfaction: Her proteges have sung major roles at the Met, Los Angeles Opera, Seattle Opera, Santa Fe Opera, and many other companies both in the U.S. and abroad.

== Awards and honors ==
Dalis was awarded the prestigious San Francisco Opera Medal in 1998. Her other credits include Principal Artist at the Metropolitan Opera, San Francisco Opera, Royal Opera House, Covent Garden, Bayreuth Festival, Chicago Lyric Opera, Berlin, Rome, Naples and others. Her awards include Fulbright Award, 1951; Richard Wagner Medallion, Bayreuth, West Germany, 1963; Tower Award, San José State University, 1974; Honored by the board of directors of the Metropolitan Opera Association on the occasion of her twentieth anniversary season, 1977; Woman of Achievement Award from the San José Mercury News and the League of Friends of Santa Clara County Commission on the Status of Women, 1983; Commendation from the Hon. John Vasconcellos, 23rd Assembly District, 1983; inducted into the California Public Educators Hall of Fame, 1985; Award of Merit from the People of the City of San Francisco, 1985; Honored Citizen of the City of San José, 1986; listed in Who's Who in America (since 1958); Who's Who in Opera (since 1971); and Who's Who in Music; Beautiful Minds Award recipient (2010). In 2013, she received the Cornerstone of the Arts awarded by the City of San Jose Arts Commission and the Career Award from the National Opera America Center.

== Personal life ==
In 1957, Dalis married McGraw Hill book editor George Loinaz who died in 1990. The marriage produced one daughter, Alida, who gave her two grandchildren. Dalis died at the age of 89 in San Jose, California on December 14, 2014. She was remembered as "a versatile and fiery mezzo-soprano who starred at the Metropolitan Opera for two decades before building a second career as the director of Opera San José, an innovative company she founded in her California hometown."
