= Kapasheda Border, Delhi =

Kapasheda Border
- Neighborhood of Delhi
- Location in Delhi, India
- Coordinates: 28.5214°N 77.082°E
- Country: India
- State: Delhi

Languages
  - Official: Hindi
- Time zone: UTC+5:30 (IST)

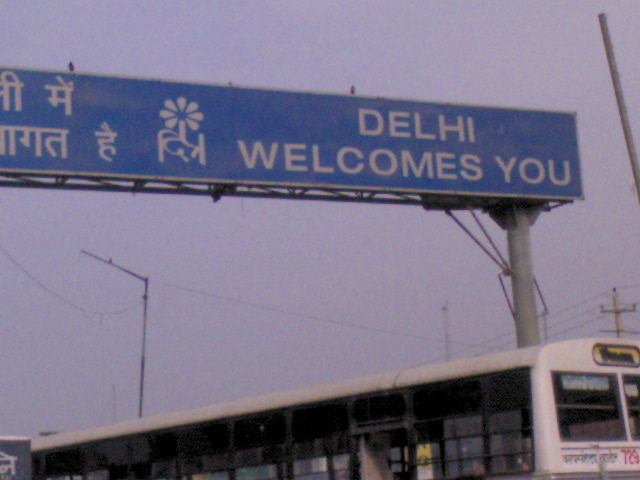
Welcome Sign at Kapashera Border

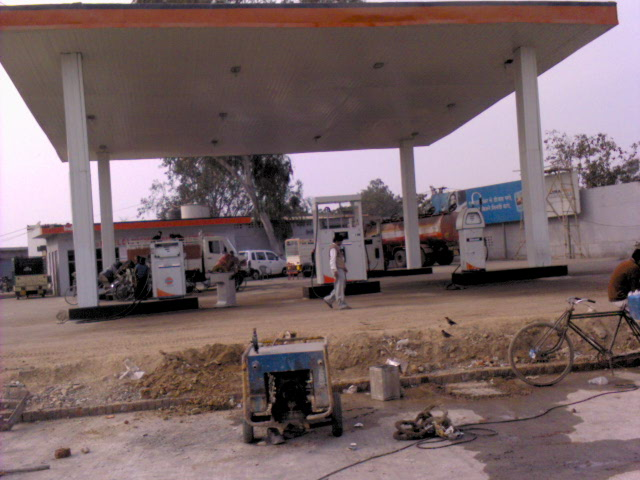
A Petrol Pump at Kapashera border

Kapashera Border is one of the main Borders of Delhi. It connects Delhi to Gurugram district of Haryana state. The road connecting two said cities is referred to as Old Delhi-Gurgaon Road.

== Bus Routes from Kapashera(Row 1) ==
One can avail the following buses from Kapashera border bus terminal----(Row1)

- To New Delhi metro station via Dhaula Kuan (Bus No: 729)
- To Dwarka & Uttam Nagar
- To Safdurjung Hospital
- To Karol Bagh
- To Badarpur
- To Najafgarh
- To Ghazipur

== List of some main borders and their proximity to nearest area in Delhi ==
- Singhu Border
- Jhatikara Border
- Auchandi Border
- Ghazipur Border
- Badarpur Border
- Kapashera Border
- Kalindi Kunj Border
- Shahdara Border
- Arjan Garh Border
- List of Main Borders of NCT --- Nearest Areas in Delhi---(Row2)
- Singhu Border(Delhi-Haryana)- Singhu, Narela
- Jhatikara Border(Delhi-Haryana)- Jhatikara Village
- Auchandi Border(Delhi-Haryana)- Auchandi Village, Bawana
- Ghazipur Border(Delhi-UP)- Ghazipur Village, Mayur Vihar
- Badarpur border(Delhi-Haryana)- Badarpur Village, Tughlakabad
- Kapashera Border(Delhi-Haryana)- Kapashera Village, Samalkha
- Kalindi Kunj(Delhi-UP)- Shaheen Bagh, okhla Village, Sarita vihar, Jasola
- Shahdara or Apsara Border(Delhi-UP)- Dilshad Garden, Shahdara
- Arjan Garh Border(Delhi-Haryana)- Arjangarh, Ghitroni
