= Nimoth =

Nimoth, Rewari
- Location within Haryana Location within India
- Coordinates: 28.2686°N 76.3651°E
- Country: India

Government
  - Body: Village panchayat

Population (2011)
  - Total: 3,979
- Time zone: UTC+5:30 (IST)
- PIN: 123411
- Website: www.rewari.gov.in

Nimoth is a village located in Dahina Block of Rewari district of Haryana state, India. Its postal head office is Dahina.

== Demographics ==
The total population of the village is 4316. Male population is 2289 while female population is 2027. as per Population Census 2011.

== Places to visit ==
Nimoth is famous for almost 500 years old temple of great Saint Baba Bishandas ji Maharaj .The temple is situated on the nimoth to kapoori road .

== Adjacent villages ==
- Zainabad
- Manpura
- Dhani Thather Bad
- Srinagar
- Dhawana
- Luhana
- Mandola
- Kapuri
- Rambass
- Bohka
