= Paprawat =

Coordinates: 28°35′N 76°59′E

Paprawat is a village in South West Delhi Tehsil in South West Delhi district of Delhi. It is located 6 km to the west of District headquarters Vasant Vihar. 19 km from State capital Delhi . In 2011, its population was counted 4412, making it the 7th most populous village in Najafgarh's sub districts. PAPRAWAT Paprawat Pin code is 110043 and postal head office is Naraina Industrial Estate .

Paprawat is surrounded by South Delhi Tehsil towards the east, Gurgaon Tehsil towards the south, West Delhi Tehsil towards the north, Delhi Tehsil towards the east.

Gurgaon, Delhi, Noida, Faridabad are the nearby cities to Paprawat. This place is in the border of the South West Delhi District and Gurgaon District. Gurgaon District Gurgaon is South towards this place. Also it is on the Border of another district, South Delhi. It is near to the Haryana State Border.

== See also ==
- Najafgarh
