= List of Scheduled Castes in Delhi =

Scheduled Castes in Delhi
- Classification: SC
- Religions: Hinduism, Sikhism, Buddhism
- Original state: Delhi
- Population: 2,812,309 (2011); 16.7% of total state
- Reservation (Education): 15%
- Reservation (Employment): 15%

Below a list of Scheduled Caste communities and their population according to the 2001 and 2011 Census of India in Delhi. There are 36 recognised Scheduled Castes in Delhi.

== List ==
1. Adi-Dharmi
2. Agria
3. Aheria
4. Balai
5. Bawaria
6. Bazigar
7. Bhangi
8. Bhil
9. Chamar, Chanwar Chamar, Jatya or Jatav Chamar, Mochi, Ramdasia, Ravidasi, Raidasi, Rehgarh or Raigar
10. Chohra (Sweeper)
11. Chuhra (Balmiki)
12. Dhanak or Dhanuk
13. Dhobi
14. Gharrami
15. Julaha (Weaver)
16. Kabirpanthi
17. Kachhandha
18. Kanjar or Giarah
19. Khatik
20. Koli(Kolhi)
21. Lalbegi
22. Madari
23. Mallah
24. Mazhabi
25. Meghwal(Meghwar)
26. Naribut
27. Nat (Rana), Badi
28. Pasi
29. Perna
30. Sansi or Bhedkut
31. Sapera
32. Sikligar
33. Singiwala or Kalbelia
34. Sirkiband

== Demographics ==
=== Caste wise ===
Scheduled Caste		Population	
Code	Caste	2001	2011
001	Ad-Dharmi	5,832	6,201
002	Agariya	1,513	2,771
003	Aheria	13,147	18,909
004	Balai	90,010	98,264
005	Banjara	15,873	18,739
006	Bawariya	10,164	7,598
007	Bazigar	315	243
008	Bhangi	12,773	11,665
009	Bhil	2,202	1,773
010	Chamar, Chanwar, Chambhar, Jatav, Mochi, Ramdasia, Ravidas, Regar	893,384	1,075,569
011	Chuhra (Sweeper)	2,567	1,638
012	Chuhra (Balmiki)	500,221	577,281
013	Dhanuk	68,317	76,115
014	Dhobi	137,299	177,675
015	Dom	3,237	3,955
016	Gharrami	221	674
017	Julaha (Weaver)	60,496	66,186
018	Kabirpanthi	6,105	5,312
019	Kachhandha	682	579
020	Kanjar/ Giarah	10,743	10,120
021	Khatik	158,121	198,124
022	Koli	167,005	198,594
023	Lal Begi	85	167
024	Madari	522	134
025	Mallah	68,411	92,012
026	Mazhabi	1,814	2,829
027	Meghwal	4,407	5,687
028	Naribut	1,459	2,839
029	Nat (Rana)	5,717	5,916
030	Pasi	40,074	59,400
031	Perna	1,064	1,758
032	Sansi, Bhedkut	18,975	23,890
033	Sapera	1,664	2,111
034	Sikligar	13,088	17,307
035	Singiwala, Kalbelia	1,160	990
036	Sirkiband	4,769	7,073
Generic castes (reported them as Harijan, Anusuchit Jati or Others)		19,819	32,211
Total		23,43,255	28,12,309

=== Caste wise ===
There were 9 districts in Delhi as for 2011 census and the population of Scheduled Castes, along with largest 3 castes is as follows:

Districts		Scheduled Castes		
District	Population	Population	Percent	Top 3 largest (by population)
North West Delhi	36,56,539	6,97,237	19.07	Jatav (257,448); Balmiki (142,818); Koli (54,114)
North Delhi	8,87,978	1,65,663	18.66	Jatav (47,381); Balmiki (27,321); Koli (21,367)
North East Delhi	22,41,624	3,73,758	16.67	Jatav (190,857); Balmiki (42,085); Koli (46,881)
East Delhi	17,09,346	2,81,422	16.46	Jatav (123,228); Balmiki (69,955); Khatik (15,499)
New Delhi	1,42,004	33,245	23.41	Balmiki (15,820); Jatav (4,915); Dhobi (4,267)
Central Delhi	5,82,320	1,43,178	24.59	Jatav (63,761); Balmiki (20,414); Khatik (14,175)
West Delhi	25,43,243	3,76,472	14.80	Jatav (132,563); Balmiki (64,482); Khatik (43,201)
South West Delhi	22,92,958	3,18,408	13.89	Jatav (110,565); Balmiki (82,228); Dhobi (21,032)
South Delhi	27,31,929	4,22,926	15.48	Jatav (144,951); Balmiki (112,158); Koli (36,739)

=== Tehsil wise ===
There were 27 tehsils in Delhi as for the 2011 census and the population of Scheduled Castes were as follows:

	Tehsil		Scheduled Castes	
S. No	Name of Tehsil	Population	Population	Percent
1	Narela	8,09,913	1,55,299	19.17
2	Saraswati Vihar	22,50,816	4,34,589	19.31
3	Model Town	5,95,810	1,07,349	18.02
4	Civil Lines	6,88,616	1,29,391	18.79
5	Sadar Bazaar	1,30,188	27,892	21.42
6	Kotwali	69,174	8,380	12.11
7	Seelampur	13,78,779	1,75,443	12.72
8	Shahdara	3,22,931	37,416	11.59
9	Seemapuri	5,39,914	1,60,899	29.80
10	Gandhi Nagar	3,95,342	37,461	9.47
11	Vivek Vihar	2,47,906	48,421	19.53
12	Preet Vihar	10,66,098	1,95,540	18.34
13	Parliamentary Street (Sansad Marg)	52,394	12,616	24.08
14	Connaught Place	28,228	5,534	19.06
15	Chanakyapuri	61,382	15,095	24.59
16	Karol Bagh	1,36,599	59,352	43.45
17	Paharganj	1,74,613	53,615	30.71
18	Daryaganj	2,71,108	30,211	11.14
19	Punjabi Bagh	7,99,453	1,63,698	20.48
20	Patel Nagar	12,62,158	1,57,422	12.47
21	Rajouri Garden	4,81,632	55,352	11.49
22	Najafgarh	13,65,152	1,71,602	12.57
23	Delhi Cantonment	2,86,140	53,894	18.83
24	Vasant Vihar	6,41,666	92,912	14.48
25	Defence Colony	6,37,775	68,480	10.74
26	Hauz Khas	12,31,293	2,19,813	17.85
27	Kalkaji	8,62,861	1,34,633	15.60

== See also ==
- 1901 Census of Delhi District
- Ethnic groups in Delhi
