= Orpheus – Oper und mehr =

German opera and music theatre magazine

ORPHEUS – Oper und mehr (until April 2017: ORPHEUS – das MusikTheatermagazin) is a bimonthly special interest magazine from Germany that deals with opera, music theatre and culture.

== History ==
The magazine was first published in 1973 as "Informationsmagazin rund um die Oper" and celebrated its 45th anniversary in 2018. Later it was extended by the special section Orpheus International with contributions on competitions, profiles and international repertoires of theatres and opera houses. Over the years it has been revised several times and updated continuously both in terms of content and structure.

After a break from January 2013 to April 2015, the magazine was published by the Munich MuP from May 2015 to March 2018.

After the sudden death of the magazine founder Clauspeter Koscielny in spring 2017, the Viennese culture journalist Stephan Burianek took over as editor-in-chief at short notice. In March 2018 the magazine was taken over by the Augsburg-based publishing house Kulturbüro. Since the end of 2019, cultural office publisher Iris Steiner has worked as editor-in-chief and replaced Stephan Burianek in this position. At the same time, Angela Schünemann became the new editor.

== Content ==
The magazine reports on the national and international opera scene on topics in front of and behind the stage, introduces newcomers and talks to stars as well as book and CD releases. Readers include opera and music theatre lovers, artists, agencies and theatre companies.
