= Opera San José =

Opera company in San Jose, California

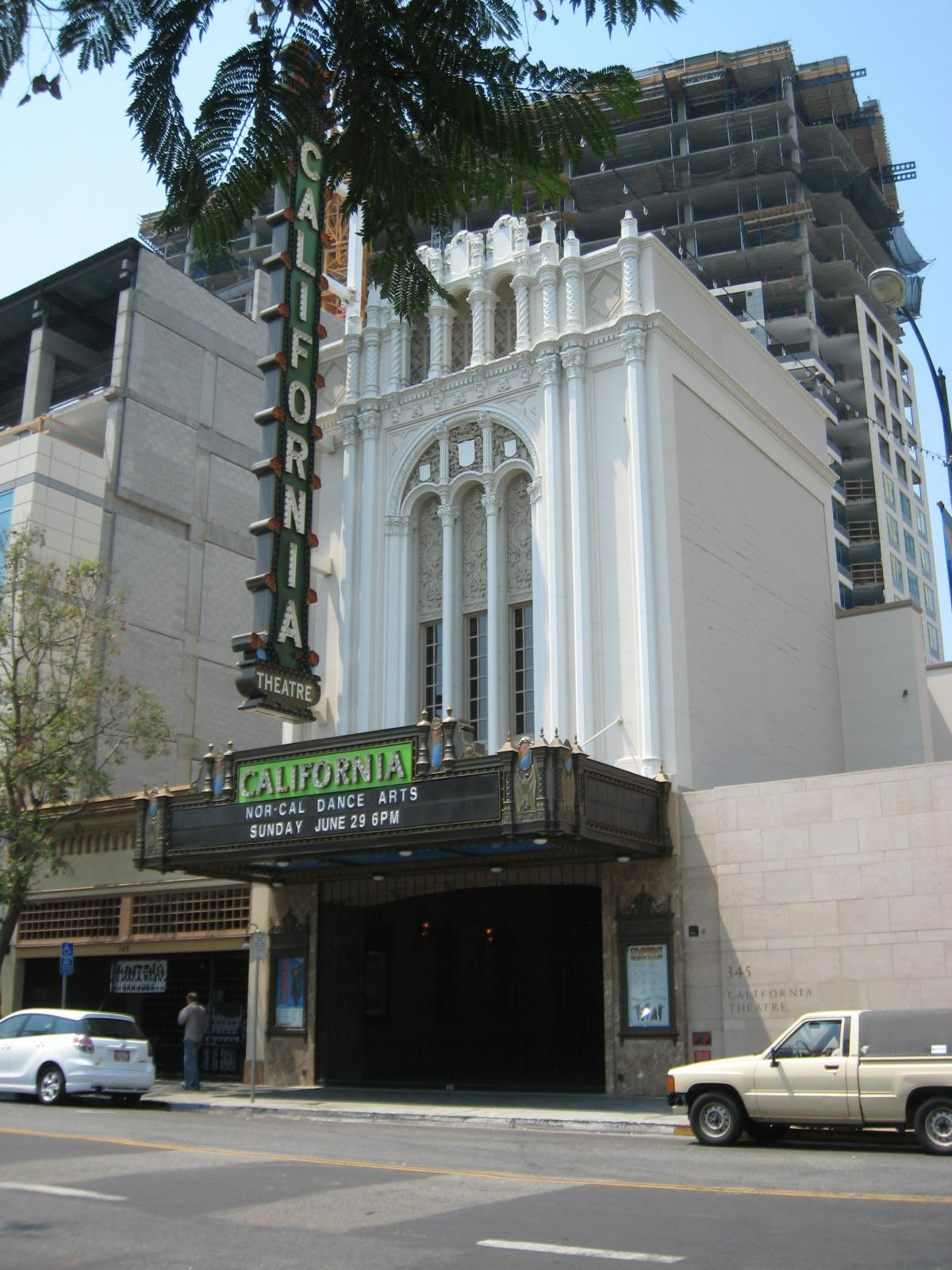
- California Theatre (2008)
- Formation: 1984; 42 years ago
- Founder: Irene Dalis
- Type: Nonprofit
- Tax ID no.: 77-0009773
- Legal status: 501(c)(3) nonprofit organization]
- Headquarters: San Jose, California, U.S.
- Coordinates: 37.333578128149455°N 121.88714977268279°W
- Website: www.operasj.org

Opera San José is an American opera company founded in 1984 by Irene Dalis (1925-2014) based in San Jose, California.

== History ==
Opera San José was founded in 1984 by mezzo-soprano singer Irene Dalis (1925-2014), who directed the company for 30 years until her retirement in 2014. In 1988, it formed a residency of principal artists that would perform in all productions, modeled after traditional European opera companies. The company purchased two apartment buildings to provide the artists with housing rent-free. Initially performances took place in the Montgomery Theater in San Jose's Civic Auditorium complex until 2004 when productions moved to the newly-restored historical California Theatre.

Larry Hancock served as the General Director from 2014 until his retirement in 2019, at which point he introduced arts administrator Khori Dastoor as his successor. Joseph Marcheso has been the music director and Principal Conductor since 2014.

In June 2021, Dastoor was selected to become the next General Director and CEO of Houston Grand Opera, beginning in January 2022. Opera San José announced the appointment of nationally acclaimed opera and theatre director Shawna Lucey as its new General Director and CEO in December 2021. Lucey's appointment as the fourth General Director in Opera San José's history would begin in January 2022, midway through the company's 38th season, overseeing productions of Bizet's Carmen and Bernstein's West Side Story as well as the return of the Irene Dalis Vocal Competition.

Following cancellations in 2020-21 due to the COVID-19 pandemic, the company's 2021–22 season began in September 2022 with a digital production of Rimsky-Korsakov's Mozart and Salieri, starring baritones Sidney Outlaw (Salieri) and Simon Barrad (Mozart). A month later, the company returned to the California Theatre with a new production of Purcell's baroque opera, Dido and Aeneas. Casting for this celebrated work included mezzo-soprano Nikola Printz as Dido, baritone Efraín Solís as Aeneas, soprano Maya Kherani as Belinda, bass-baritone Nathan Stark as the Sorcerer, and dancers from San José Dance Theatre.

In June 2020, Opera San José unveiled its plans to create the Heiman Digital Media Studio, a new performance/film space that enables the company to stream fully produced operatic performances into the living room of patrons. The studio was funded by a donation from Opera San José trustee Peggy Heiman in honor of her late husband, Fred Heiman. On July 11, 2020, Opera San José launched its Digital Media Studio series with virtual performances of Robert Schumann's Dichterliebe ('A Poet's Love') song cycle performed by Resident Artist baritone Eugene Brancoveanu and Resident Artist conductor Christopher James Ray on piano. The virtual performance was offered in English with Spanish and Vietnamese translations.

A few months later, in December 2020, Opera San José presented a new fully staged production of Jake Heggie's chamber opera, Three Decembers, featuring mezzo-soprano Susan Graham in the central role, alongside Resident Artists soprano Maya Kherani and baritone Efraín Solís. Virtual offerings that followed Three Decembers included a virtual New Year's Eve celebration, The Parting Glass (December 2020); Love & Secrets: A Domestic Trilogy (April 2021); Sing For Your Supper! (May 2021); and The Parting Glass Part 2: Back to the Bar! (December 2021).

== California Theatre ==
The premiere season of Opera San José began on September 18, 2004, at the 1,100-seat California Theater. The California Theatre, which opened as a vaudeville and movie theatre in 1927, was renovated nearly 30 years after it closed its doors in 1973. It is currently one of the most significant performing venues in the area.

== Resident company ==
Opera San José's resident company is made up of early career artists that are identified and awarded annual contracts. During their tenure, members of the resident company perform leading roles in mainstage productions and participate in school and community-wide educational activities. Modeled after the German regional opera company, the resident company aims to prepare its artists for further career opportunities through performance experience and coaching by conductors and stage directors.

== Operations ==
To date, Opera San José has presented 150 opera productions, including five world premieres among the 64 titles in its repertoire. Notable productions include the American premiere of Alma Deutcher's Cinderella (2017), Jake Heggie's Moby-Dick (2019), and a large-scale production of Mozart's Idomeneo: ré di Creta (2011) jointly produced with the Packard Humanities.

The number of K-12 educational performances has exceeded 2,300. Community programming for adult audiences totals some 3,200 performances. Between all areas of programming, the company reached approximately 113,000 in its last complete season (2018-2019).

Opera San José has received four-star ratings from Charity Navigator for its record of responsible fiscal management.

Opera San José is funded by the city of San José as well as by donors such as Applied Materials, Packard Humanities Institute, Hewlett Foundation, David and Lucile Packard Foundation, and the Getty Foundation.
