= Nangal Dewat =

Town in New Delhi, India

Nangal Dewat Vasant Kunj Block D
- Village/Suburb
- Location in India
- Coordinates: 28.525963°N 77.138910°E
- Country: India
- State: Delhi
- District: New Delhi

Government
  - Type: Democratic
  - Body: Airports Authority of India

Population (2001)
  - Total: 13,168

Languages
  - Official: Hindi, English
- Time zone: UTC+5:30 (IST)
- Postal code: 110070

Nangal Dewat is a census town in the New Delhi district of the Indian union territory of Delhi. Airport Authority of India (AAI) acquired the village in 1965 for future expansion, however, due to repeated protests, it was not fully acquired until 2007.

The settlement is made up of four blocks and has many parks and lands for future use. This is a society or community in Delhi with broad roads and multi-story homes. Rental properties are a source of income.

== Demographics ==
As of 2001 census, Nangal Dewat had a population of 13,168. Males constitute 56% of the population and females 44%. Nangal Dewat has an average literacy rate of 64%, which is higher than the national average of 59.5%. Male literacy is 73% and female literacy is 52%. In Nangal Dewat, 14% of the population is under 6 years of age.

Nangal dewat is sehrawat gotra jat village where multiple communities were staying .Land of this village was acquired for construction of the New IGI airport after the Palam airport had reached its saturation. The original location of this village was demolished in 2007 for the IGI airport extension. The inhabitants were moved to Vasant Kunj . AAI (Airport Authority of India) and DDA (Delhi Development Authority) were found wanting in the process of rehabilitation and resettlement vide allotment of the alternative plots in lieu of the residential area acquired from the villagers in the original location.

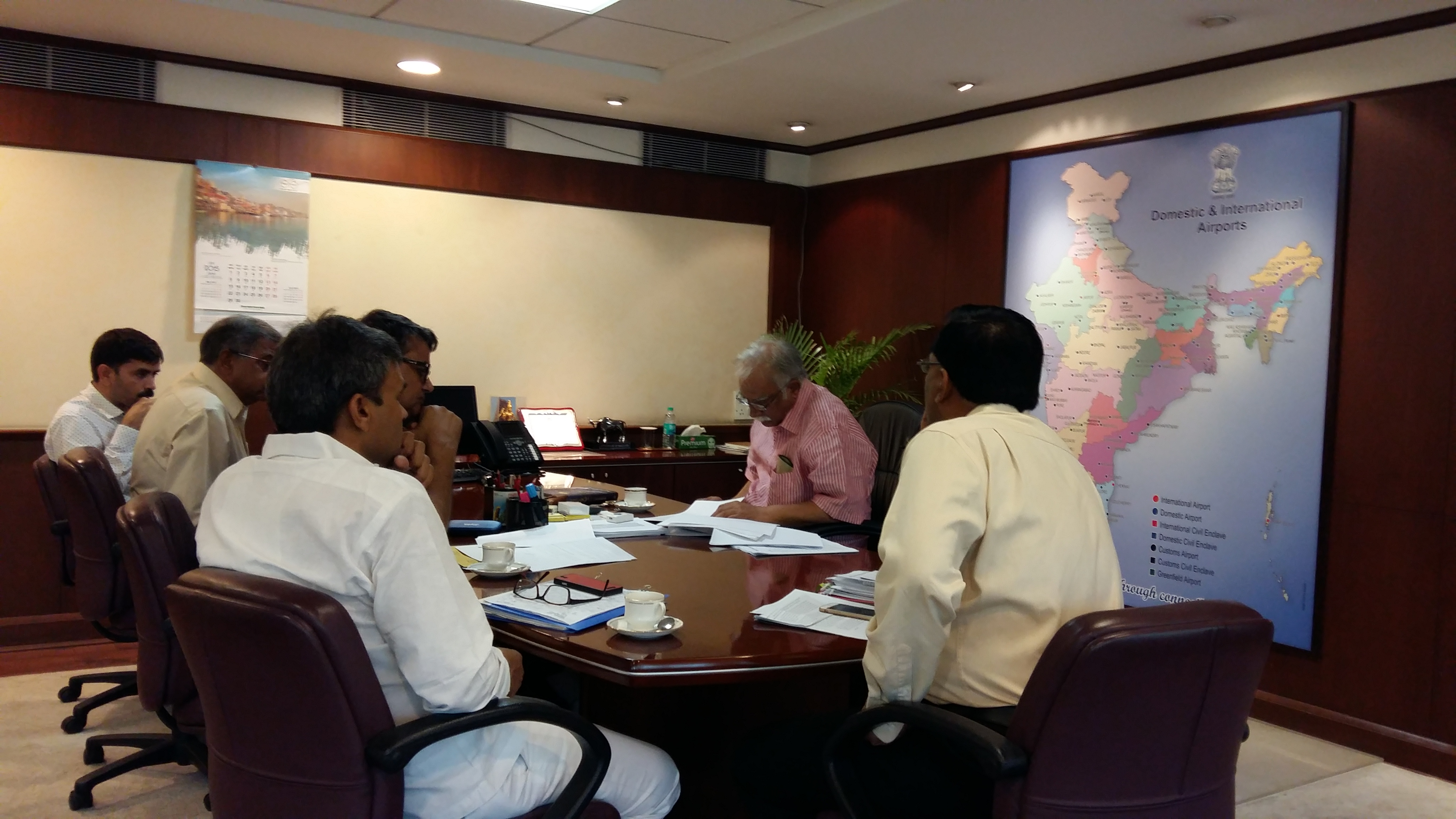
The Resident Welfare Association (RWA) of Village Nangal Dewat along with the then Member of Legislative Assembly, (MLA) Colonel Devinder Sehrawat meeting the Union Civil Aviation Minister Shri Ashok Gajpati Raju to take matters of the residents

This matter was subjudice and on direction of the court the Hon'ble Lt Governor of Delhi was assigned the responsibility of ensuring fair resettlement of the displaced villagers.

Many villagers would not get alternative plots until August 2013, and most of the villagers do not live in the new Nangal Dewat as the plots are still not allotted to them. More than Most of those who were denied allotment of the resettlement plots were from the weaker sections and the dalit community.

People were waiting for justice as of 2017, even though the village was displaced on 2007 by AAI without paying even a single rupee. DDA has been accused of corruption in allotting plots by using a population survey from 1972. By 2007 the families in the 1972 survey had grown and the single plot leads to loss of valuable land. Plots were a maximum plot size of 650 meters square. The government displaced the entire village without paying for construction. DDA saved half of the land acquired for villagers by using an old survey, however, villagers didn't receive half of their land share.
