= Khori =

- village
- Location within Madhya Pradesh Location within India
- Coordinates: 23.2762356°N 77.2261452°E
- Country: India
- State: Madhya Pradesh
- District: Bhopal
- Tehsil: Huzur
- Elevation: 515 m (1,690 ft)

Population (2011)
  - Total: 1,571
- Time zone: UTC+5:30 (IST)
- ISO 3166 code: MP-IN
- 2011 census code: 482473

Khori is a village in the Bhopal district of Madhya Pradesh, India. It is located in the Huzur tehsil and the Phanda block.

== Demographics ==
According to the 2011 census of India, Khori has 380 households. The effective literacy rate (i.e. the literacy rate of population excluding children aged 6 and below) is 32.86%.

Demographics (2011 Census)
	Total	Male	Female
Population	1571	801	770
Children aged below 6 years	299	157	142
Scheduled caste	250	132	118
Scheduled tribe	0	0	0
Literates	418	241	177
Workers (all)	710	429	281
Main workers (total)	381	284	97
Main workers: Cultivators	21	20	1
Main workers: Agricultural labourers	346	253	93
Main workers: Household industry workers	0	0	0
Main workers: Other	14	11	3
Marginal workers (total)	329	145	184
Marginal workers: Cultivators	6	3	3
Marginal workers: Agricultural labourers	310	137	173
Marginal workers: Household industry workers	0	0	0
Marginal workers: Others	13	5	8
Non-workers	861	372	489
