= Kapashera =

Kapashera Kāpasahēṛā
- Subdistrict of Delhi
- Kapashera
- Location in India
- Coordinates: 28.5261°N 77.0800°E
- Country: India
- State: Delhi
- District: South West

Population (2019)
  - Total: 500,000+

Languages
  - Official: Hindi, English
- Time zone: UTC+5:30 (IST)
- Postal code: 110037
- Vehicle registration: DL9C

Kapashera (ISO: Kāpasahēṛā) is the administrative headquarters and one of the three sub-division of the South West district of Delhi NCT, India. The office of deputy commissioner is located at Old Tax Terminal building.

== Transport ==
Kapashera is strategically located near the Delhi–Gurgaon border and is accessible through multiple modes of transportation. Despite its proximity to major infrastructure, the locality lacks direct metro connectivity, which has been a longstanding public demand.

Road

Kapashera lies just 1 km from National Highway 8 (NH-8), providing seamless road access to central Delhi, Gurugram, and Indira Gandhi International Airport. Auto-rickshaws, taxis, and private buses are commonly used for local transit.

Bus

Delhi Transport Corporation (DTC) and cluster buses frequently serve the area. Key route numbers include 539, 543, 543A, 578, 712, 718, 729, and 804A. These routes connect Kapashera to major neighborhoods across Delhi and adjoining regions.

Rail

The nearest railway station is Bijwasan railway station, located approximately 2 km away. It caters mainly to local and passenger trains. Major railheads such as New Delhi railway station and Hazrat Nizamuddin railway station are accessible via road.

Metro

The closest Delhi Metro station is Dwarka Sector 21 metro station, around 6 km from Kapashera, on the Airport Express Line. However, there is no direct metro line serving Kapashera, and residents often rely on feeder services or shared transport to reach the nearest station.

Air

Indira Gandhi International Airport, India's busiest airport, is situated roughly 7 km away, making Kapashera well-placed for air travel. The proximity to Terminal 3 is particularly advantageous for international and domestic travelers.

Demand for Metro Connectivity

Over the past 15 years, residents and local bodies have consistently demanded a dedicated metro line connecting Kapashera with Dwarka and Gurugram. Despite growing urbanization and heavy commuter traffic, successive governments have not acted on these proposals, leaving the area underserved by rapid transit infrastructure.

== Politics ==
Kapashera is part of the Bijwasan Assembly constituency in the Delhi Legislative Assembly and falls under Ward No. 132 of the Municipal Corporation of Delhi (MCD).

=== Current Representatives ===
Political Representation of Kapashera (as of 2025)
Position	Name	Party	Notes
MLA (Bijwasan)	Kailash Gahlot	Bharatiya Janata Party (BJP)	Elected in 2025 Delhi Assembly election
MCD Councillor (Ward 132)	Aarti Yadav	Aam Aadmi Party (AAP)	Elected in 2022 MCD polls

=== Recent Developments ===
In the 2025 Delhi Assembly election, Kailash Gahlot of the BJP was elected as the MLA from Bijwasan, defeating the incumbent Bhupinder Singh Joon. Joon, who had previously won in 2020 representing the Aam Aadmi Party, switched allegiance to the BJP shortly before the election.

Aarti Yadav continues to serve as the elected MCD councillor from Ward 132 (Kapashera), representing AAP. She was earlier elected as an independent in 2017, joined BJP in 2019, and later moved to AAP in 2021 citing governance issues within the BJP.

== Demographics ==
According to the 2011 Census of India, Kapashera had a population of 74,073, comprising 50,123 males (68%) and 23,950 females (32%). The average literacy rate stood at 90.34%, which was higher than the Delhi state average of 86.21%. Male literacy was around 92.35%, while female literacy was 82.13%. Children below the age of six made up 13.72% of the population.

As of As of 2025, the population of Kapashera is unofficially estimated to exceed 100,000 due to continuous migration and proximity to major industrial zones such as Udyog Vihar and IMT Manesar. The population is largely composed of:

- Long-term migrants: Workers who have settled in the area for over a decade, many of whom have transitioned into the local housing economy.
- Short-term labor migrants: Individuals residing in rented accommodations for work, often on 6–12 month contracts.
- Local residents: Accounting for less than 10% of the population, many are engaged in property rentals and support services.

The area also features the popular Fun N Food Village, an amusement and water park that serves as a key recreational attraction. Kapashera shares a border with Gurgaon, Haryana, making it a significant transit zone between Delhi and the neighboring state.

== Growth in Recent Decade ==
Kapashera has grown at an unprecedented rate because of rapid industrialization around the area such as Udhyog Vihar Industrial Area and Maruti Factory in Gurgaon.

The area is also under a DDA redevelopment zone and it is expected that it will grow even faster in the 2020s.

Due to industrialisation, migrants now have a sizable population and most of the natives are in the rent business.

In 2001, the population was 20,000 and in 2011, the population was 75,000, a 400% increase. Now the city has population of 5,00,000.

== Groundwater and Land Subsidence ==
A study published in Nature scientific report reports that land is sinking down in Delhi due to groundwater overpumping.
