= Aphariya =

Aphariya (Abhirya) also spelt as Affariya, Afariya or Phariya) is a Ahir caste subclan. Aphariyas ruled the Ahirwal state of Haryana, in India.

== History ==
Aphariyas are those who on the basis of their military power and cultivable land holdings proved to be dominant. In early 8th century Charu Rao had established a local feudal state in Tijara with Tijara as its capital. Many Aphariyas founded jagirs in its vicinity, and Rewari was one of them. All the jagirdar were under the dominant leader Charu Rao and 18 generations of Aphariya ruled the Ahirwal region of present-day southern Haryana and North-Eastern Rajasthan. Rao Nand Ram from the Aphariya clan was the governor of Rewari during the reign of Mughal emperor Aurangzeb. His eldest son Rao Bal Kishan who got killed at Karnal in 1739, fought for Mughals against Nadir Shah. In recognition of his services, his brother Rao Gujar Mal was made Governor of Hissar along with Rewari and given the mansabdari of 5000 zat and shortly afterward set up a semi-independent principality at Gokalgarh by building forts and issuing his own coin. His descendants fought against Jats, Marathas, Afghans and Rajputs alternatively, and their political history was practically identical to that of the former leaders of the clan. Rao Tula Ram was the famous last noble from the clan and was one of the leaders of the Indian Rebellion of 1857 in Haryana. After the rebellions were crushed by Britisher, he left India and went to Iran and Afghanistan to raise the army but at age of 38 died due to dysentry. At their zenith the Rewari kingdom consisted of 360 villages, but the British reduced them to 45, and these, too, were taken away during the reign of Tula Ram due to his conduct during mutinies of 1857.

In the Mughal period, the Aphariya, the Kausaliya and the Khola were the major aristocratic clans in undivided Punjab now Haryana who had direct contact with the Mughal state. They were conceived as the brave soldiers in the region. These clans represented the Rewari kingdom as part of the mythical ‘Yadava Hindu State’ and they portrayed themselves as followers of Krishna. They claimed to originate from Mathura town: Krishna’s birthplace so they named Rewari’s fort Gokalgarh and their coins Gokul Sikka, in honor of the village of Gokul where Krishna spent part of his childhood, ‘they took the name of Krishna in marching against their enemies.

== Legacy in Ahirwal Region ==
=== Bada Talab ===
Bada Talab was built by Rao Tej Singh during the year 1810-1815, so it is also known as Rao Tej Singh Talab. The pond is situated near the old Town Hall of Rewari. It is filled with rainwater or canal through underground inlets. There is a separate bathing provision for females and males in the pond. A temple of Lord Hanuman is situated on the bank of Bada Talab. A large number of people visit this famous temple for prayer.

=== Baag Wala Talab ===
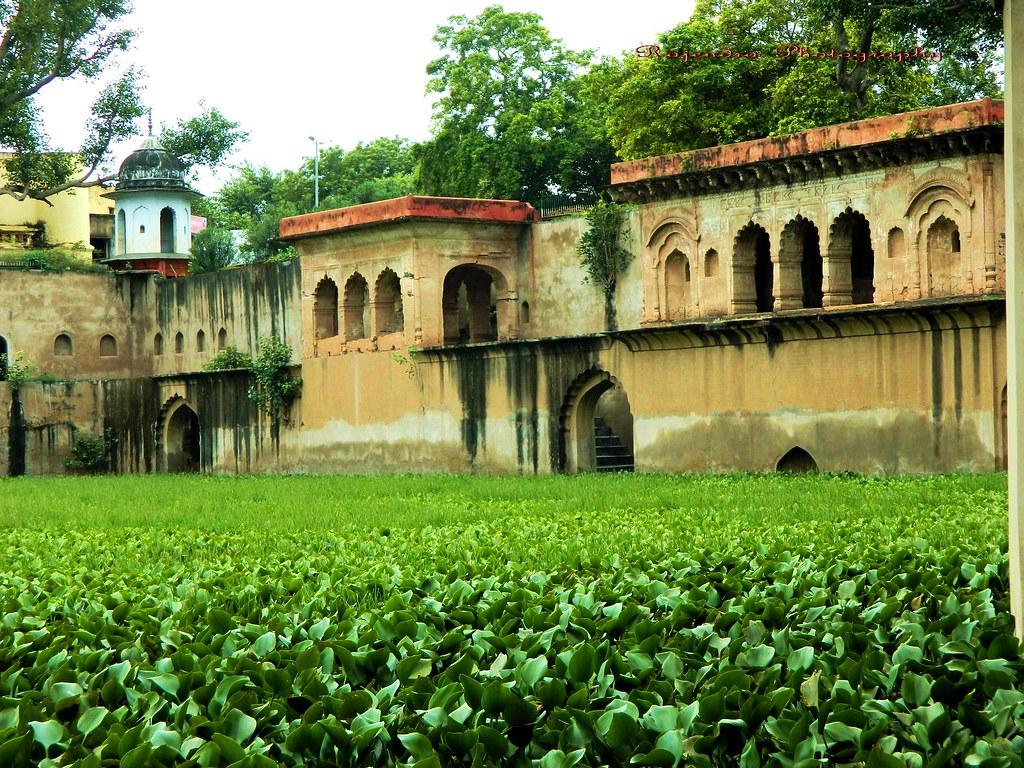
Baag wala Talab - Rewari

Baag Wala Talab is situated near the old Tehsil office Rewari. It was built by Rao Gujjarmal, presently it's maintained by ASI and in very neglected conditions.
