= South West Delhi district =

South West Delhi district Dakṣinṇa Paścima Dillī
- District of Delhi
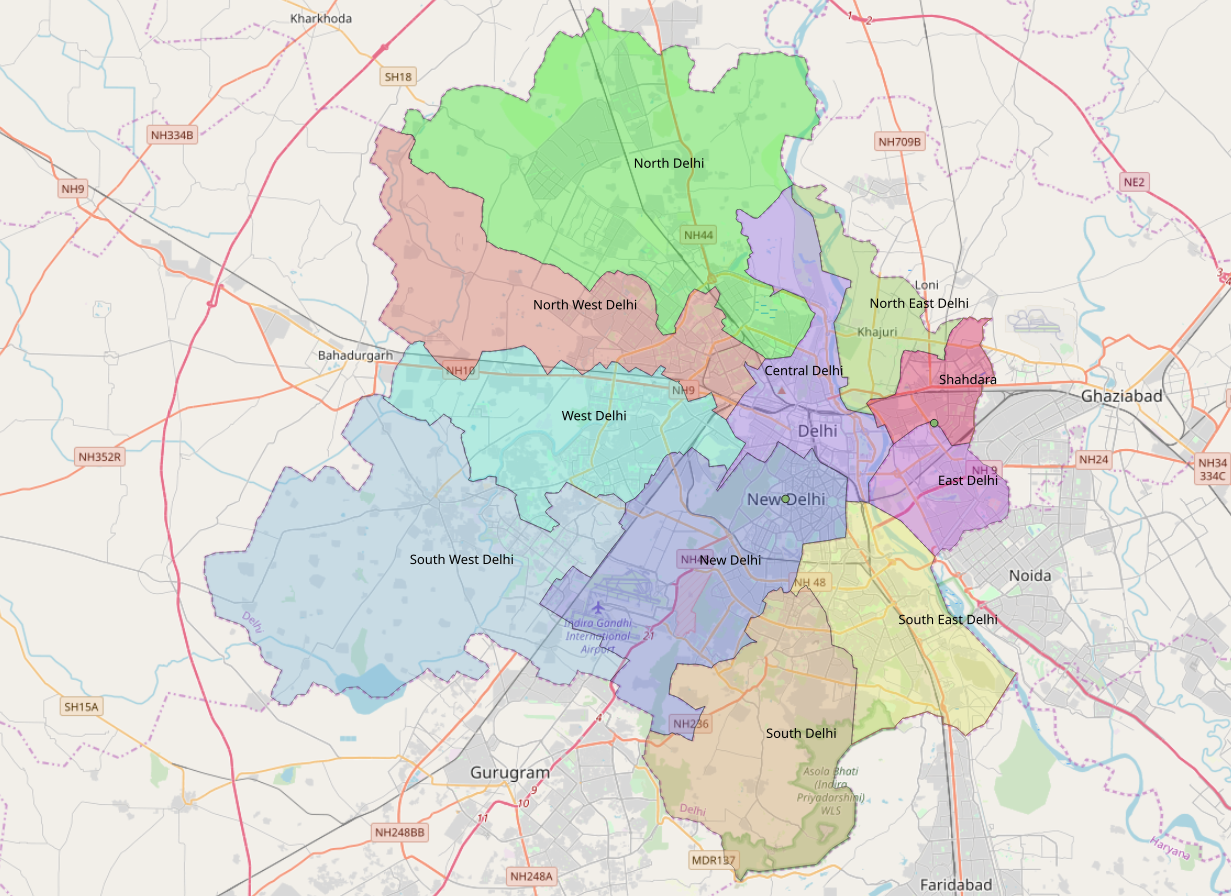
- Location in Delhi, India
- Coordinates: 28.60955°N 77.13967°E
- Country: India
- State: Delhi
- Created: 1997
- Founder: Sahib Singh Varma
- Named for: The southwestern part of Delhi
- Headquarters: Kapashera

Government
  - Body: Municipal Corporation Of Delhi

Population (2011)
  - Total: 2,292,958

Languages
  - Official: Hindi, Punjabi, English.
- Time zone: UTC+5:30 (IST)
- PIN: 1100xx
- STD Code: 011
- Lok Sabha constituencies: West Delhi, South Delhi
- Website: https://dmsouthwest.delhi.gov.in/

South West Delhi district (ISO: Dakṣinṇa Paścima Dillī) is one of the eleven administrative districts of the National Capital Territory of Delhi in India. Kapashera serves as the administrative headquarters of South West Delhi.

South West Delhi is bounded by the districts of West Delhi to the north, Central Delhi to the northeast, New Delhi and South Delhi to the east, Gurgaon District of Haryana state to the south, and Jhajjar District of Haryana to the west.

South West Delhi has a population of 2,292,958 (2011 census), and an area of 420 km², with a population density of 5,445 inhabitants per square kilometre. It is the fourth most populous district in Delhi.

The district court that functions under the Delhi High Court for South West Delhi is also located in Dwarka Sector 10.

Administratively, the district is divided into three subdivisions, Dwarka, Najafgarh and Kapashera.

== History ==
South West Delhi is one of the old nine districts that came into existence in January 1997. The District then composed of three Sub-Divisions; Vasant Vihar, Janakpuri, Najafgarh, Kapashera and Delhi Cantonment, and had its headquarters at Palam.

== Geography ==
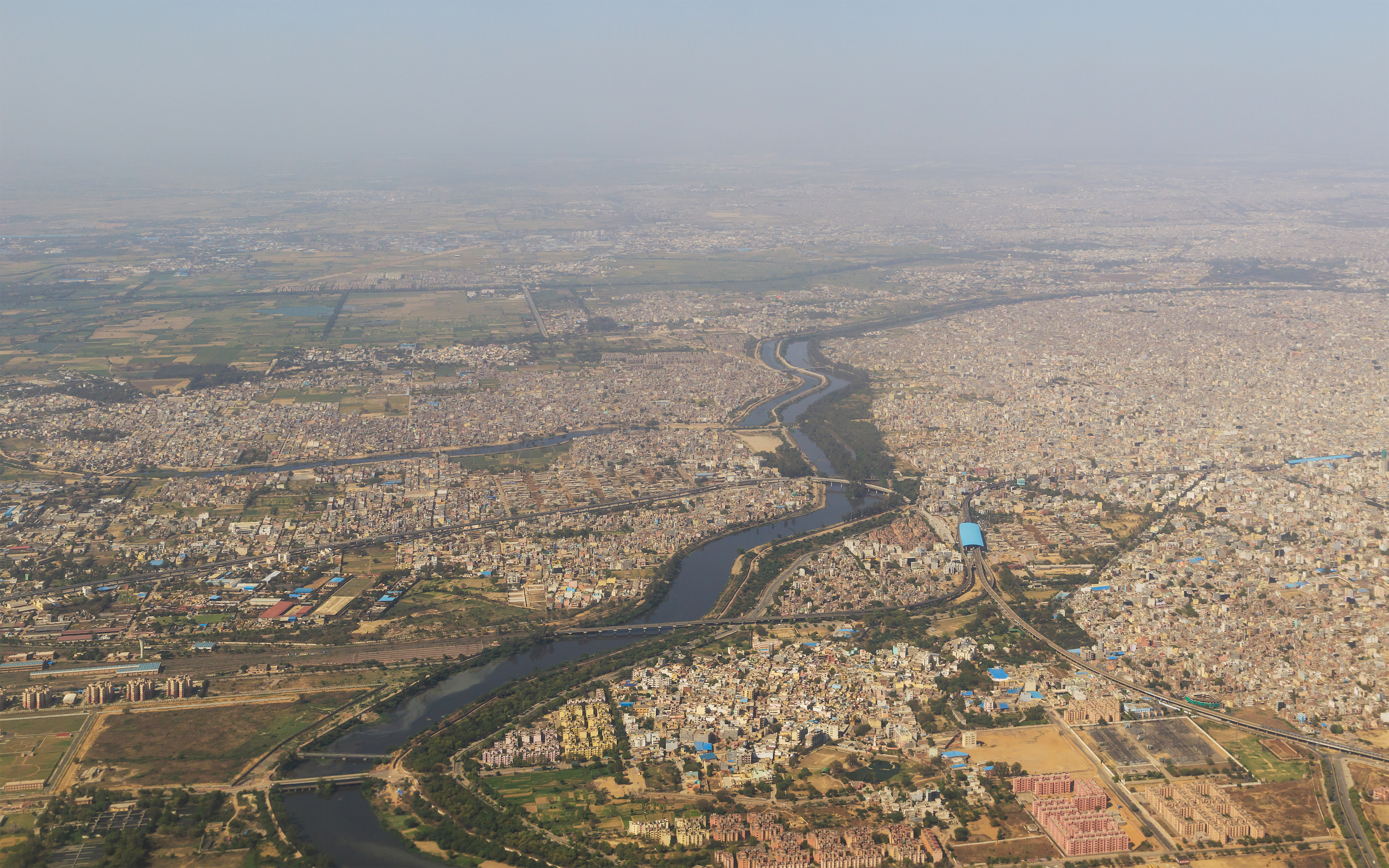
Aerial view of South West Delhi at Najafgarh drain

The South West District of Delhi is situated in the southwest part of Delhi. It is located between latitude 28 40' and 28 29’ and longitude between 76 50’ and 77 14’. The South West district has a varied character with Kapashera Sub Division as predominantly rural the Dwarka Sub Division as mostly urban and Najafgarh Sub Divisions as a mix of both urban and rural populations.

== Demographics ==
Historical population
| Year | Pop. | ±% p.a. |
|---|---|---|
| 1961 | 251,383 | — |
| 1971 | 479,189 | +6.66% |
| 1981 | 679,170 | +3.55% |
| 1991 | 1,087,573 | +4.82% |
| 2001 | 1,755,041 | +4.90% |
| 2011 | 2,292,958 | +2.71% |

According to the 2011 census South West Delhi has a population of 2,292,958 roughly equal to the nation of Latvia or the US state of New Mexico. This gives it a ranking of 198th in India (out of a total of 640). The district has a population density of 5,445 inhabitants per square kilometre (14,100/sq mi). Its population growth rate over the decade 2001-2011 was 30.62%. South West Delhi has a sex ratio of 836 females for every 1000 males, and a literacy rate of 88.81%.

== See also ==
- Asalat Pur Khawad
- Districts of Delhi
- Kapashera
- Samalka
- Nangal Dewat
- North Delhi
- Central Delhi
- New Delhi
- South Delhi
- Shahdara
