= Rewari Block of Rewari District =

Rewari Block Rewari
- Panchayat samiti
- Location in Rewari, Haryana, India Rewari Block (India)
- Coordinates: 28.188110°N 76.611542°E
- Country: India
- State: Haryana
- District: Rewari

Languages
  - Official: Hindi
- Time zone: UTC+5:30 (IST)
- PIN: 123401
- Vehicle registration: HR36
- Nearest city: Rewari
- Sex ratio: 1:1 ♂/♀
- Literacy: 100%

Rewari Block (Rewari Panchayat samiti) of Rewari district consists of 94 Gram panchayats and 118 Villages and 123401 is its pincode number.

Name of villages of Rewari Block
| Serial | Gram Panchayat | Gram Sabha areas & Hadbast number |
|---|---|---|
| 1 | Aakera | Aakera 292 |
| 2 | Alawalpur | Alawalpur 303 |
| 3 | Balawas Ahir | Balawas Ahir 128 |
| 4 | Baliar Kalan | Baliar Kalan |
| 4 | (Mundia Khera) | (Mundia Khera) 199, 198 |
| 5 | Baliar Khurd | Baliar Khurd 200 |
| 6 | Bamber (Fatehpuri Pipa, Bamber, Molawas, Muradpuri, Kanhawas) | Bamber (Fatehpuri Pipa, Bamber, Molawas, Muradpuri, Kanhawas) 182, 181, 183, 189, 184 |
| 7 | Bariawas | Bariawas 170 |
| 8 | Bhagwanpur | Bhagwanpur 121 |
| 9 | Bharawas | Bharawas 145 |
| 10 | Akbarpur | Akbarpur 146 |
| 11 | Kharsanki | Kharsanki |
| 11 | (Kharkhari Bhiwa) | (Kharkhari Bhiwa) 147, 142 |
| 12 | Bhatsana | Bhatsana 301 |
| 13 | Bhurthal Jat | Bhurthal Jat 216 |
| 14 | Bikaner | Bikaner 221 |
| 15 | Bithwana | Bithwana 149 |
| 16 | Budana | Budana 202 |
| 17 | Budani | Budani 208 |
| 18 | Bhudpur (Aaspur) | Bhudpur (Aaspur) 116 |
| 19 | Chandawas | Chandawas 117 |
| 20 | Chhuriawas | Chhuriawas 157 |
| 21 | Chillar (Dhanora, Chillar, Bhurthal Thetar | Chillar (Dhanora, Chillar, Bhurthal Thetar) 259, 215 |
| 22 | Dabri | Dabri 210 |
| 23 | Daliaki | Daliaki 133 |
| 24 | Devlawas (Dhamlaka Devlawas) | Devlawas (Dhamlaka Devlawas) |
| 24 | (Gajjiwas) | (Gajjiwas) 154, 155, 153, 124 |
| 25 | Dhakia | Dhakia 286 |
| 26 | Dhaliawas | Dhaliawas 173 |
| 27 | Dohki | Dohki 120 |
| 28 | Dungarwas | Dungarwas 194 |
| 29 | Fadni (Turkiawas) | Fadni (Turkiawas) 201, 275 |
| 30 | Fideri (Qtabpur Jagir) | Fideri (Qtabpur Jagir) 204 |
| 31 | Gangaycha Ahir | Gangaycha Ahir 222 |
| 32 | Gangaycha Jat | Gangaycha Jat 223 |
| 33 | Garhi Alawalpur | Garhi Alawalpur 294 |
| 34 | Ghatal Mahaniawas | Ghatal Mahaniawas 291 |
| 35 | Ghurkawas | Ghurkawas 217 |
| 36 | Gindokhar | Gindokhar 113 |
| 37 | Gokalgarh | Gokalgarh 119 |
| 38 | Gokalpur (Kumbhawas) | Gokalpur (Kumbhawas) 211 |
| 39 | Hansaka | Hansaka 203 |
| 40 | Husainpur (Hari Nagar) | Husainpur (Hari Nagar) 134 |
| 41 | Jadra | Jadra 87 |
| 42 | Jitpur Istmurar (Rojka) | Jitpur Istmurar (Rojka) 282 |
| 43 | Jaitrawas | Jaitrawas 143 |
| 44 | Jant Sairwas | Jant Sairwas 213 |
| 45 | Janti | Janti 212 |
| 46 | Jatuwas | Jatuwas 148 |
| 47 | Jaitpur Shekhpur | Jaitpur Shekhpur 260 |
| 48 | Jonawas | Jonawas 197 |
| 49 | Joniawas | Joniawas 296 |
| 50 | Kakoria | Kakoria 214 |
| 51 | Kaluwas | Kaluwas 118 |
| 52 | Kalaka | Kalaka 177 |
| 53 | Kamalpur (Bhiwari) | Kamalpur (Bhiwari) 152, 150 |
| 54 | Karnawas | Karnawas 151 |
| 55 | Kaunsiwas | Kaunsiwas 175 |
| 56 | Kishangarh | Kishangarh 110 |
| 57 | Kharagwas | Kharagwas 127 |
| 58 | Khalilpuri | Khalilpuri 179 |
| 59 | Khijuri | Khijuri 190 |
| 60 | Lakhnor | Lakhnor 115 |
| 61 | Ladhuwas Ahir | Ladhuwas Ahir 129 |
| 62 | Lisana | Lisana 220 |
| 63 | Majra Gurdas | Majra Gurdas 176 |
| 64 | Majra Sheoraj | Majra Sheoraj 180 |
| 65 | Mundhalia | Mundhalia 218 |
| 66 | Mandhia Kalan | Mandhia Kalan 178 |
| 67 | Meerpur (Pachlai) | Meerpur (Pachlai) 274 |
| 68 | Naya Gaon | Naya Gaon 219 |
| 69 | Narianpur | Narianpur 138 |
| 70 | Padhiawas | Padhiawas 172 |
| 71 | Nangli Godha | Nangli Godha 141 |
| 72 | Ramgarh (Chitarpur) | Ramgarh (Chitarpur) 209, 207 |
| 73 | Rampura | Rampura 132 |
| 74 | Rajpura Khalsa | Rajpura Khalsa 111 |
| 75 | Shekhpur Shikarpur | Shekhpur Shikarpur 224 |
| 76 | Shahbajpur Khalsa | Shahbajpur Khalsa 171 |
| 77 | Thothwal | Thothwal 139, 140 |
| 78 | Kapriwas | Kapriwas 290 |
| 79 | Khar Khara | Khar Khara 300 |
| 80 | Khatawali (Dohana) | Khatawali (Dohana) 284 |
| 81 | Rajpura Alamgirpur | Rajpura Alamgirpur 140 |
| 82 | Sunaria (Ashadpur) | Sunaria (Ashadpur) 279, 250 |
| 83 | Malpura | Malpura 295 |
| 84 | Malahera | Malahera 278 |
| 85 | Maheshwari | Maheshwari 293 |
| 86 | Nandrampur Bas | Nandrampur Bas 304 |
| 87 | Tatarpur Khalsa | Tatarpur Khalsa 302 |
| 88 | Tatarpur Istmurar | Tatarpur Istmurar 277 |
| 89 | Khaliawas (Titarpur) | Khaliawas (Titarpur) 283 |
| 90 | Masani | Masani 196 |
| 91 | Niganiawas | Niganiawas 192 |
| 92 | Nikhri | Nikhri 193 |
| 93 | Rasgan | Rasgan 195 |
| 94 | Saharanwas (Gangli) | Saharanwas (Gangli) 130 |

== Notes ==
1.excluding municipalities, cantonments and Municipal Corporations constituted by law
