= Jatusana Block of Rewari =

Jatusana block is a tehsil in Rewari district, Haryana, India. It consists of 65 Gram Panchayats and 73 villages.

Ruby Rajkumar Yadav Chairman Block Simiti Jatusana resident of Qutubpuri Bujurg

== Village panchayats ==
- 1. Asiaki Gorawas
- 2. Aulant
- 3. Babdoli
- 4. Balawas Jamapur
- 5. Baldhan Kalan
- 6. Baldhan Khurd
- 7. Berli Kalan
- 8. Berli Khurd
- 9. Biharipur, Rewari
- 10. Bohatwas Bhondu
- 11. Boria Kamalpur
- 12. Chandanwas
- 13. (A) Chowki No. 1 (Name of Gram Panchyat); (B) Maliaki
- 14. Chowki No. 2
- 15. Dahina
- 16. Dakhora
- 17. Daroli, Rewari
- 18. Dehlawas
- 19. Didoli
- 20. Kahari, Rewari
- 21. Dohkia
- 22. Fatehpuri Tappa Dahina
- 23. Gadhla
- 24. Gopal Pur Gazi
- 25. Gothra Tappa Dahina
- 26. Gulabpura, Rewari
- 27. Gurawra
- 28. Haluhera
- 29. (A) Hansawas (Name of Gram Panchyat); (B) Prithvipura
- 30. Jatusana
- 31. Jeewra
- 32. Kanhora
- 33. Kanhori
- 34. Kanwali
- 35. Karawra Manakpur
- 36. Khera Alampur
- 37. Khushpura
- 38. Kumbrodha
- 39. Lala, Rewari
- 40. Lisan
- 41. Mandhia Khurd
- 42. Maseet
- 43. Mastapur
- 44. Mohdinpur
- 45. Motla Kalan
- 46. Motla Khurd
- 47. Murlipur
- 48. Musepur
- 49. (A) Nain Sukhpura (Name of Gram Panchyat); (B) Mundanwas; (C) Jaruwas
- 50. Nangal Mundi
- 51. Nangal Pathani
- 52. Nanglia Ranmokh
- 53. (A) Pahrajwas (name of Gram Panchyat); (B) Saidpur, Rewari; (C) Chag, Rewari
- 54. (A) Palhawas; (B) Chang, Rewari
- 55. Parkhotampur
- 56. Qutubpuri Bujurg
- 57. Rampuri, Rewari
- 58. Rasuli
- 59. Rohrai
- 60. Rojhuwas
- 61. (A) Shadipur, Rewari (Name of Gram Panchyat); (B) Rajawas; (C) Nurpur, Rewari
- 62. Sihas
- 63. Suma Khera
- 64. Tehana Depalpur

== See also ==
- Jatusana
- Rewari
