= Jatusana =

Jatusana Jatuthana
- village
- Location in Rewari, Haryana, India Jatusana (India)
- Coordinates: 28°20′N 76°33′E
- Country: India
- State: Haryana
- District: Rewari

Government
  - Type: Panchayat raj
  - Body: Gram panchayat

Population
  - Total: 8,500

Languages
  - Official: Hindi
- Time zone: UTC+5:30 (IST)
- PIN: 123401
- Telephone code: 01281
- Vehicle registration: HR-36
- Nearest city: Rewari
- Sex ratio: 877 ♂/♀
- Literacy: 78.41%
- Vidhan Sabha constituency: Kosli

Jatusana is a village and block of Rewari district in Haryana.

== History ==
Previously, it was known as Jatu-Thana, one of the biggest and most powerful thanas (Police Station) in Punjab (because Haryana was itself in Punjab at that time) during the 18th and the first half of the 19th century.

Anil Yadav is the current MLA of Govt of Haryana. It is located 25 km to the north of District headquarters Rewari.

This village is also having a Gaushala Named Shiv Mohan Gaushala with 1000+ cows living here.

== Village Panchayats of Jatusana Block ==
- Asiaki Gorawas
- Aulant
- Babdoli
- Balawas Jamapur
- Baldhan Kalan
- Baldhan Khurd
- Berli Kalan
- Berli Khurd
- Biharipur, Rewari
- Bohatwas Bhondu
- Boria Kamalpur
- Chandanwas
- (A) Chowki No. 1, (B) Maliaki - Name of Gram Panchyat - Chowki No. 1
- Chowki No. 2 - Name of Gram Panchyat - Chowki No. 2
- Dahina
- Dakhora
- Daroli, Rewari - Similar name exists also in Karnataka, India
- Dehlawas
- Didoli
- Kahari, Rewari - Similar name exists Kähäri also in a district of the city of Turku, in Finland country.
- Dohkia
- Fatehpuri Tappa Dahina
- Gadhla
- Gopal Pur Gazi
- Gothra Tappa Dahina
- Gulabpura, Rewari
- Gurawra
- Haluhera Sarpanch - Sangeeta Devi, Panch - Pawan Yadav, Geeta Devi, Hitu, Suresh
- (A) Hansawas, (B) Prithvipura - Name of Gram Panchyat - Hansawas
- Jeewra
- Kanhora
- Kanhori
- Kanwali
- Karawra Manakpur
- Khera Alampur
- Khushpura
- Kumbrodha
- Lala, Rewari
- Lisan
- Mandhia Khurd
- Maseet
- Mastapur
- Mohdinpur
- Motla Kalan
- Motla Khurd
- Murlipur
- Musepur
- (A) Nain Sukhpura, (B) Mundanwas, (C) Jaruwas - Name of Gram Panchyat - Nain Sukhpura
- Nangal Mundi
- Nangal Pathani
- Nanglia Ranmokh
- (A) Pahrajwas, (B) Saidpur, Rewari, (C) Chag, Rewari - Name of Gram Panchyat - Pahrajwas
- (A) Palhawas, (B) Chang, Rewari -Similar place/village is also in Iran country- Name of Gram Panchyat - Palhawas
- Parkhotampur
- Qutubpuri Bujurg Belongs to current Block Pramukh (chairman) Ruby Rajkumar Yadav
- Rampuri, Rewari - Similar place/village is also in Uttar Pradesh
- Rasuli
- Rohrai
- Rojhuwas
- (A) Shadipur, Rewari - Similar place/ village is also in Punjab, (B) Rajawas, (C) Nurpur, Rewari - Similar place/ village is also in Himachal Pradesh - Name of Gram Panchyat - Shadipur, Rewari
- Sihas
- Suma Khera
- Tehana Depalpur

== See also ==
- Rewari
