= Jitpur Istamrar =

Jitpura Istamrar Jeetpura
- Location within Haryana Location within India
- Coordinates: 28.218845°N 76.722074°E
- Country: India
- Time zone: UTC+5:30 (IST)
- PIN: 123106
- Telephone code: 01274
- Website: www.rewari.gov.in

Jitpur istamrar is a village in Rewari tehsil, Rewari district, Haryana, India. It is one of 274 villages in Rewari tehsil. Nearby railway station of Jitpur istamrar is Rewari.

== Adjacent villages ==
- Khijuri
- Masani
- Dungarwas
- Nikhri
- Masani
- Khaliawas
- Bhatsana
- Niganiawas
- Raliawas
- Rojhka
- Jonawas
