= Salhawas, Rewari =

Salhawas
- village
- Location within Haryana Location within India
- Coordinates: 28.143076°N 76.673035°E
- Country: India
- State: Haryana
- District: Rewari district
- Municipality: Rewari

Population (2011)
  - Total: 1,139
- PIN: 122106
- ISO 3166 code: IN-HR
- Website: www.rewari.gov.in

Salhawas is a village in Rewari district, Haryana, India. It is about 9.9 kilometres (6.2 mi) from the Rewari-Delhi road via Garhi Bolni road and Delhi-Ajmer Expressway.

== Demographics ==
As of 2011 India census, Salhawas had a population of 1139 in 186 households. Males (598) constitute 52.5% of the population and females (541) 47.49%. Salhawas has an average literacy(660) rate of 57.94%, lower than the national average of 74%: male literacy(428) is 64.84%, and female literacy(232) is 35.15% of total literates (232). In Salhawas, 17.2% of the population is under 6 years of age (196).

== Adjacent villages ==
- Masani
- Rasgan
- Dungarwas
- Hansaka
- Jaunawas (Jonawas)
- Nikhri
- Kanhawas
- Salhawas
- Ashiaki
- Majra Gurdas
