= Aakera =

Aakera (Rewari)
- Location within Haryana Location within India
- Coordinates: 28.231440°N 76.849754°E
- Country: India
- State: Haryana
- District: Rewari district
- Municipality: Rewari

Population (2011)
  - Total: 7,110
- ISO 3166 code: RJ-IN
- Website: www.rewari.gov.in

Aakera is a village situated in Rewari district, India. Aakera is about 27.5 kilometres (17.1 mi) on Jaipur Highway.

== Demographics ==
As of 2011 India census, Aakera had a population of 7110 in 1778 households. Males (4143) constitute 58.27% of the population and females (2967) 41.72%. Aakera has an average literacy (4913) rate of 69.09%, lower than the national average of 74%: male literacy (3199) is 65.11%, and female literacy (1714) is 34.88% of total literates (4913). In Aakera, 16.01% of the population is under 6 years of age (1139).

== Aakera in other Districts ==
Similarly Aakera is in Rajasthan and two places of Haryana as under

- State- Haryana, District- Rewari, SubDistrict-Rewari, Village Name- Aakera (292) (CT)(062658) TOWN Aakera (292) (CT) It has two 'Aa' as a prefix.
- State- Haryana, District-Mewat, SubDistrict-Nuh, Village Name- Akera (121)(063168) VILLAGE Akera (121) It has only one 'a' as a prefix.
- State- Rajasthan, District- Baran, SubDistrict- Baran, Village Name- Akera (102789) It has only one 'a' as a prefix.

== Adjacent villages ==
- Kapriwas
- Khijuriwas
- Bhiwadi town
- Dharuhera town
- Nikhri Village
- Rasgan
- Dungarwas
- Jaunawas (Jonawas)
- Raliawas
