= Baldhan Khurd =

- Shri shiv Krishan Goshala samiti Village-Baldhan khurd, Baba dhuna wala sewa dham
- Location within Haryana Location within India
- Coordinates: 28.323254°N 76.472937°E
- Country: India

Government
  - Body: Village panchayat

Population (2021)
  - Total: 841
- Time zone: UTC+5:30 (IST)
- Website: www.rewari.gov.in

Shri shiv Krishan Goshala samiti(reg.-HGSA/661/2023)Baldhan Khurd, is a village in Jatusana Block in Rewari District of Haryana State, India. It belongs to Gurgaon Division. It is located 21 km towards west from District headquarters Rewari. 7 km from Jatusana. 315 km from State capital Chandigarh. Khushpura (2 km), Rampuri (3 km), Motla Kalan (3 km), Babroli (3 km), Fatehpuri Tappa Dahina (4 km) are the nearby villages to Baldhan Khurd.
