= Raliawas =

- Village
- Location within Haryana Location within India
- Coordinates: 28.158536°N 76.713450°E
- Country: India
- State: Haryana
- District: Rewari district
- Municipality: Rewari
- Elevation: 245 m (804 ft)

Population (2011)
  - Total: 2,470
- Postal code: 123106
- Area code: 01274
- ISO 3166 code: IN-HR
- Vehicle registration: HR-36
- Website: www.rewari.gov.in

Raliawas is a village in Rewari district of Haryana, India. It is about 12 kilometres (7.5 mi) from Rewari city on the Delhi-Jaipur Highway (NH-8), near the National Highway (NH-71). The village is located on the bank of the Sahibi river, and it is a Yadav-dominant village of Girdh Gotra. The village has various facilities, such as a post office, government primary and high schools, a government dispensary, a veterinary hospital, a telephone exchange, and a cooperative bank. It also has a large gymnasium and two large temples, the Vishwakarma Temple and the Shiva Temple.

== Demographics ==
As of 2011 India census, Raliawas had a population of 2470 in 475 households. Males (1309) constitute 52.99% of the population and females (1161) 47%. Raliawas has an average literacy(1783) rate of 72.18%, lower than the national average of 74%: male literacy(1075) is 60.29%, and female literacy(708) is 39.7% of total literates (1783). In Raliawas, 11.86% of the population is under 6 years of age (293).

== Adjacent villages ==
- Masani
- Rasgan
- Dungarwas
- Hansaka
- Jaunawas (jonawas)
- Nikhri
- Kanhawas
- Salhawas
- Ashiaki
- Majra Gurdas
