= Kharagwas =

- Country: India
- Time zone: UTC+5:30 (IST)
- PIN: 123401
- Website: www.rewari.gov.in

Kharagwas is a village in Rewari mandal of Rewari district, in the Indian state of Haryana. It is near Chandawas village Rewari at about 7.9 kilometres (4.9 mi) on the approach Rewari- Mahendergarh District Road.

== Adjacent villages ==
- Kaluwas
- Chandawas
- Saharanwas
- Budhpur
