= Kaluwas, Rewari =

Kaluwas
- Location within Haryana Location within India
- Coordinates: 28.210700°N 76.616721°E
- Country: India

Population (2011)
  - Total: 1,511
- Time zone: UTC+5:30 (IST)
- PIN: 123 xxx
- Website: www.rewari.gov.in

Kaluwas is a village in Rewari mandal of Rewari district, in the Indian state of Haryana. It is near Chandawas village Rewari at about 7 kilometres (4.3 mi) on the approach Rewari- Mahendergarh District Road.

== Demographics ==
As of 2011 India census, Kaluwas had a population of 1511 in 301 households. Males (778) constitute 51.48% of the population and females (733) 48.51%. Kaluwas has an average literacy (1144) rate of 75.71%, more than the national average of 74%: male literacy (659) is 57.60%, and female literacy (485) is 42.39%. In Kaluwas, 11.71% of the population is under 6 years of age (177).

== Adjacent villages ==
- Kharagwas
- Chandawas
- Saharanwas
- Budhpur
