= Niganiawas =

- Location within Haryana Location within India
- Coordinates: 28.165412°N 76.724994°E
- Country: India
- State: Haryana
- District: Rewari district
- Municipality: Rewari

Population (2011)
  - Total: 859
- Postal code: 122106
- ISO 3166 code: IN-HR
- Website: www.rewari.gov.in

Niganiawas is a village situated in Rewari district, India. It is about 22.2 kilometres (13.8 mi) on Jaipur Highway from Rewari- Delhi road.

== Demographics ==
As of 2011 India census, Niganiawas had a population of 859 in 475 households. Males (444) constitute 51.68% of the population and females (415) 48.31%. Niganiawas has an average literacy(596) rate of 69.38%, lower than the national average of 74%: male literacy(350) is 58.72%, and female literacy(246) is 41.27% of total literates (596). In Niganiawas, 12.22% of the population is under 6 years of age (105).

== Adjacent villages ==
- Nikhri
- Rasgan
- Dungarwas
- Hansaka
- jonawas
- Masani
- Kanhawas
- Salhawas
- Ashiaki
- Majra Gurdas
