= Jaunawas =

Jaunawas Jonawas
- Location within Haryana Location within India
- Coordinates: 28.202968°N 76.705512°E
- Country: India

Government
  - Body: Village panchayat

Population (2011)
  - Total: 1,956
- Time zone: UTC+5:30 (IST)
- PIN: 122106
- Website: www.rewari.gov.in

Jaunawas (or Jonawas is a village in Rewari district, Haryana India. It is about 9.7 km from Rewari town on the Rewari-Delhi Road near Hansaka.

== Demographics of 2011 ==
As of 2011 India census, Jaunawas, Rewari had a population of 1956 in 398 households. Males (1024) constitute 52.35% of the population and females (932) 47.64%. Jaunawas has an average literacy (1482) rate of 75.76%, higher than the national average of 74%: male literacy (862) is 58.16%, and female literacy (620) is 41.83% of total literates (1482). In Jaunawas, Rewari, 12.37% of the population is under 6 years of age (245).

== Adjacent villages ==
- Nikhri Village on NH48 (Old NH08)
- Hansaka on Rewari-Delhi road
- Masani on Rewari-Delhi road
- Dungarwas on Rewari-Delhi road
- Baliar Khurd (Rewari)
- Baliar Kalan
- Mundia Khera
- Khijuri
- Rasgan

== See also ==
- Joniawas (on the Rewari-Delhi road on Jaipur Highway)
