= Ghasera Fort =

- Ruined Fort
- Location within Haryana Location within India
- Coordinates: 28.1362471°N 77.0765927°E
- Country: India
- State: Haryana
- District: Mewat district
- Elevation: 199 m (653 ft)
- Demonym: Mewati

Languages
- Time zone: UTC+5:30 (IST)
- Postal code: 122107
- ISO 3166 code: IN-HR
- Vehicle registration: HR

Ghasera Fort is a ruined fort in Ghasera village in Nuh district of Haryana state in northern India, which has been notified as a protected monument by the state government. Currently, the majority of the residents of the village are Muslim Meos, though Hindus also live there.

== History ==
The ruined Ghasera Fort lies at Ghasera village 14 kilometres (8.7 mi) from Nuh city on Nun-Sohna highway. In the 18th century, Ghasera was ruled by Bargurjar Rajputs whose territory included the parganas of Ghasera, Indor, (Note: Indor still exists. It is located near Bhiwadi in the present day Alwar district in the state of Rajasthan, approximately 28 kilometres (17 mi) from Ghasera. It is now within the tehsil of Tijara. Although similarly named, it is not related to the city of Indore.) Kotla, and Sohna. To their north was the Princely State of Nawabs of Farrukhnagar which was founded in 1732. To their west was the jagir of the Raos of Rewari, ancestors of Rao Tula Ram. They possessed forts at Gokulgarh and Gurawra (or, Guraora). In the south were the Jat rulers of Bharatpur State, and Kachwaha Rajput rulers of Alwar State. The Mughals, who were protected by Marathas, had seen their territory shrink to a nominal area from Delhi to Palam.

== Battle of Ghasera ==
Battle of Ghasera
Date	1753
Location	Ghasera
Result	Jat victory.

Belligerents
Bharatpur State Wazir of Safdar Jang	Rajputs of Bargujar clan

Commanders and leaders
Maharaja Surajmal Mir Muhammad Panah †	Bahadur Singh Bargujar †

Strength
20,000 to 25,000 men	8,000 men

Casualties and losses
15,000 died	8,000 died

The battle of Ghasera fought between Jat ruler against Rajput ruler. This battle was the result of Mughal Rebellion. The Jats defeated the Rajputs in ghasera. The Rajput women committed Jauhar and the Rajput male warriors killed 15,000 of the enemy.

== Architecture ==
Ruined walls and a grand entrance in stone and lakhori bricks built with surkhi (crushed baked red bricked)-lime mortar show that Ghasera was a historical village. Of the four entrances, only one remains.

== See also ==
- List of Monuments of National Importance in Haryana
- State Protected Monuments in Haryana
- List of Indus Valley Civilization sites in Haryana, Punjab, Rajasthan, Gujarat, India & Pakistan
- National Parks & Wildlife Sanctuaries of Haryana
- List of Indian states and territories by highest point
- Tourism in Haryana
- Haryana Tourism
