= Katopuri =

Village in Haryana, India

Coordinates: 28.340402°N 76.571145°E

- Village
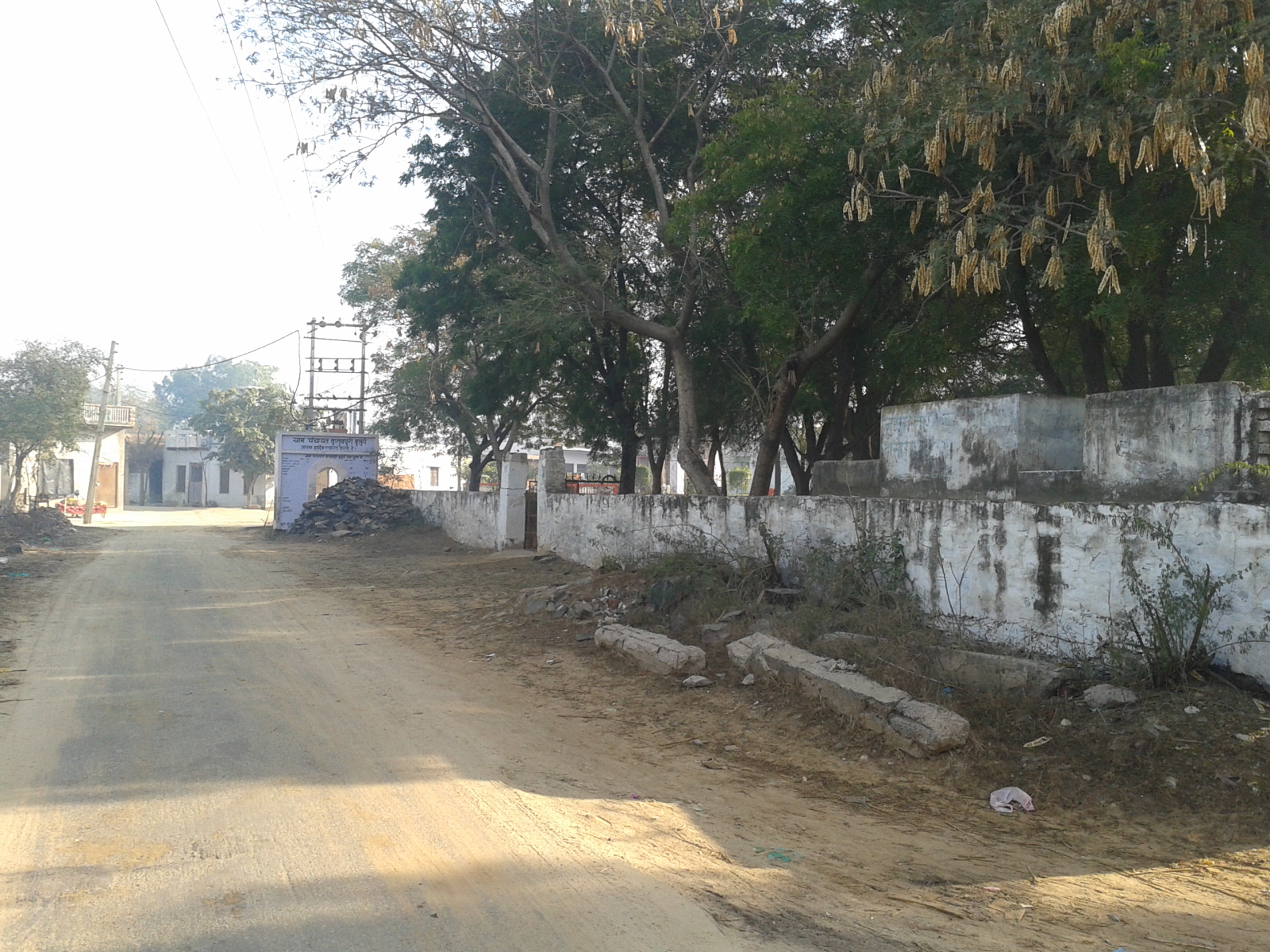
- Katopuri in Rewari district, Haryana

- Flag
- Nickname: Katopuri Bujurg
- Location within Haryana Location within India
- Country: India
- State: Haryana
- District: Rewari

Government
  - Mr.Bikram Singh Yadav: State Minister for Cooperation, Haryana

Population (2011)
  - Total: 1,094
- Postal code: 123401
- Area code: 01281
- ISO 3166 code: IN-HR
- Website: haryana.gov.in

Katopuri is a village in block Jatusana in Rewari district, Haryana, India with a population of 1094 (564 male, 530 female) including 124 from Scheduled Castes and Scheduled Tribes (65 male, 59 female).

== Gallery ==
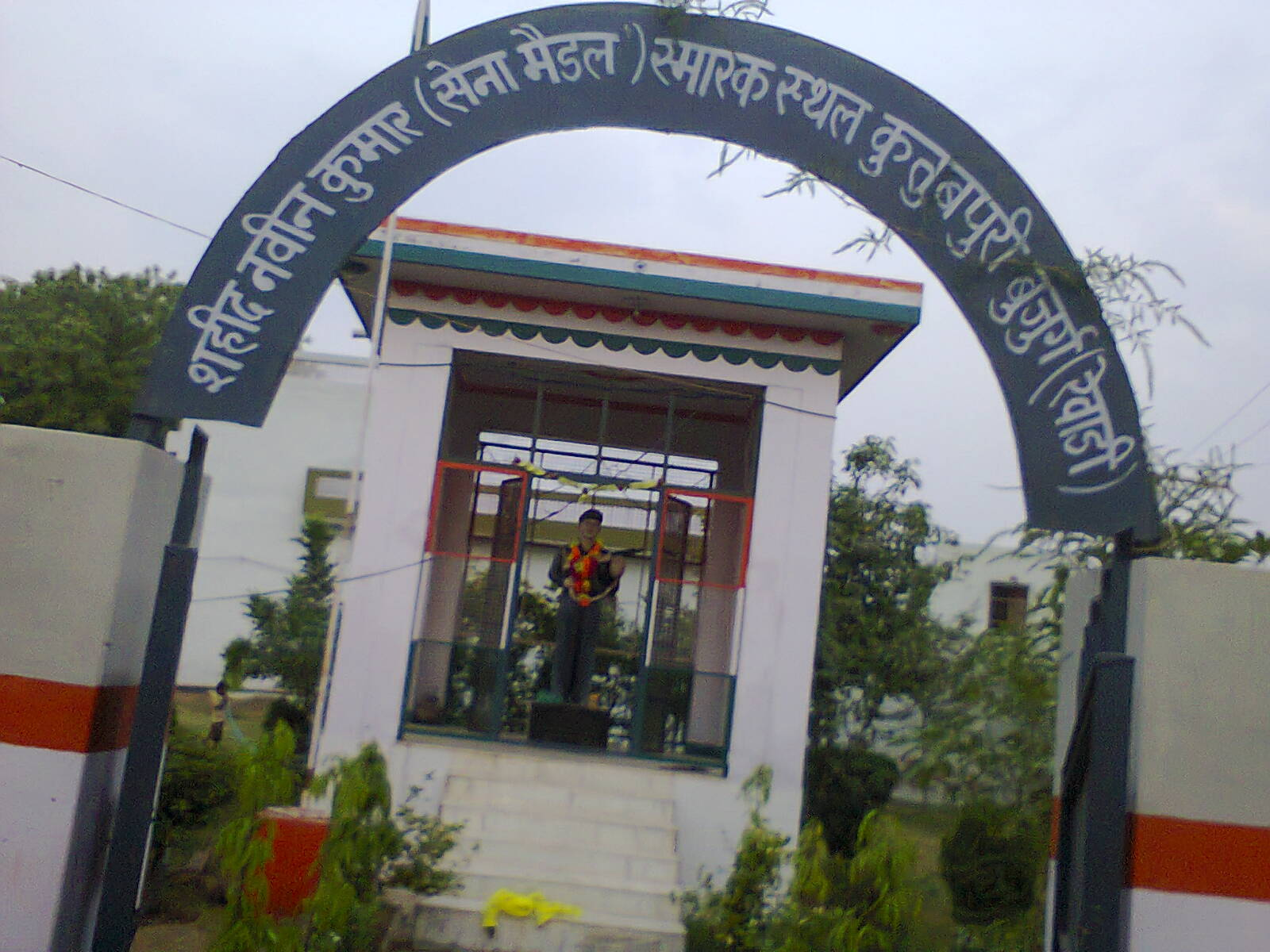
Amar Saheed Naveen Kumar
