= Khaliawas =

- Location within Haryana Location within India
- Coordinates: 28.198528°N 76.755294°E
- Country: India
- State: Haryana
- District: Rewari district
- Municipality: Rewari

Population (2011)
  - Total: 1,469
- PIN: 122106
- ISO 3166 code: IN-HR
- Website: www.rewari.gov.in

Khaliawas is a village in Rewari district, Haryana, India. It is about 15 kilometres (9.3 mi) on Jaipur Highway from Rewari- Delhi road near Saahbi Dam.It is also in Rewari Municipality.

== Adjacent villages ==
- Nikhri on NH-48
- Masani
- Rasgan
- Dungarwas
- Jaunawas (Jonawas)
