= Pahrajwas =

Pahrajwas, Rewari
- Location within Haryana Location within India
- Coordinates: 28.344506°N 76.621054°E
- Country: India

Government
  - Body: Village panchayat
- Time zone: UTC+5:30 (IST)
- Website: www.rewari.gov.in

Pahrajwas is a small village in Jatusana block of Rewari district of Haryana. The place enjoys lush green surroundings during winter season. Mustard fields enhances the beauty of this little place during winters. Indian national bird 'Peacock' is among the few bird species found here. It has 188 households. Male Population is 407 and Female Population is 381.Total Population is 788 It is a village in Rewari tehsil. 123035 is its Pincode.

== Adjacent villages ==
- Palhawas
- Rohrai
- Kulana
