= All India Institute of Medical Sciences, Rewari =

Public medical college and hospital in Rewari (Majra), India

- Seal of AIIMS Rewari
- Type: Public Medical School
- Established: 2026; 0 years ago
- President: Dr. Dharmendra Singh Gangwar
- Director: Dr. D. N. Sharma
- Location: Rewari (Majra M. Bhalkhi), Haryana, 123102, India
- Campus: Semi Urban 210 acres (85 ha)
- Language: Hindi and English
- Website: aiimsrewari.edu.in

All India Institute of Medical Sciences Rewari (AIIMS Rewari) (IAST: Akhil Bhāratiya Āyurvignan Sangsthān Rewari) is an under construction Public hospital and Medical school located at Majra, Rewari, Haryana, India.

== History ==
At Union minister Rao Inderjit Singh's request, Chief Minister of Haryana Manohar Lal Khattar announced plans to set up AIIMS in Rewari (Manethi) at an election rally at Bawal in 2015. In 2018, Rao Indrajit Singh had met Prime Minister Narendra Modi too in this regard. AIIMS Rewari was Announced on 1 February 2019 and approved on 28 February 2019, construction started in 2023.

It is the 22nd AIIMS in the country, and will be constructed at a cost of ₹1299 crore.On 1 February 2019, in the presentation of the interim budget for 2019–2020, Finance Minister Piyush Goyal announced an AIIMS in Haryana. This institute was later identified as "Phase-VIII". The Union Cabinet approved to set up the institute at Manethi, Rewari district on 28 February 2023.

Initially, the institute was planned to be built at Manethi village in Rewari. However, the government faced hurdles in acquiring land there, Because most of the area is part of the Aravalli's forest. Due to this, the government later had to change its plans and shift AIIMS to Majra village. The Haryana government was able to acquire 80 acres of land till July 2022, out of which 60 acres of panchayat land. Union Minister of State for Planning Rao Inderjit Singh informed in September 2022 that about 190 acres of land has been acquired for the hospital, and the acquisition process for the remaining parcels of land will be completed soon.

The first MBBS batch (50 seats) at AIIMS Rewari had commenced classes in October 2026 while admissions began in August 2026.

On 31 July 2026, Lok Sabha was informed that AIIMS Rawari will be completed by December 2026.

== Healthcare ==
=== Medical facilities ===
The AIIMS Rewari will have 15-18 super specialty departments.

=== Hospital ===
The hospital will have around 750 beds. As per the current operational AIIMS data, it is expected that the hospital will cater to around 1500 OPD patients per day and around 1000 IPD patients per month.

Connectivity

A full trumpet interchange has been approved to provide direct access between AIIMS Rewari and National Highway 48. The project is estimated to cost ₹308 crore, and construction is expected to begin following approval from the concerned authorities. The interchange is planned to improve traffic movement and address waterlogging issues reported near existing underpasses during monsoon months.

== Academics ==
Like all other AIIMS the institute will select students for MBBS course through NEET(UG) annually. The institute will have 100 UG (MBBS) seats and 60 B.Sc. (Nursing) seats.

=== Campus ===
The campus spans 210 acres (85 hectares) in the semi-urban region of Majra–Bhalkhi (Cheeta Dungra Village Road), located approximately 20–22 km from Rewari city on National Highway 11 (India) . The land for the project was provided by the Haryana state government. The design includes academic blocks, residential facilities, a hospital complex, and research infrastructure.

== See also ==
- AIIMS Badsa, in Jhajjar in Haryana
- List of AIIMS in India
- List of medical colleges in India
- List of institutions of higher education in Haryana
