= Mastapur =

- Mustafapur
- Location within Haryana Location within India
- Coordinates: 28.290163°N 76.608055°E
- Country: India
- Time zone: UTC+5:30 (IST)
- PIN: 123 401
- Vehicle registration: HR 36 xxxx
- Website: www.rewari.gov.in

Mastapur is a Hindu village in Rewari of Jatusana block, in the Indian state of Haryana.

== Toll plaza ==
It has a toll plaza which employs numerous people from the village. Vehicles going from Jhajjar to Rewari or back have to pay the toll.

== Adjacent villages ==
- Gokalgarh
- Guraora
- Bikaner
- Palhawas
- Mohdipur
- Tehna Dipalpur, Rohrai, Karawara Manakpur
