= Peacock & Chinkara Breeding Centre, Jhabua =

Peacock & Chinkara Breeding Centre, Jhabuwa
- Indian peafowl & Chinkara Wildlife protection
- Location in Haryana, India Peacock & Chinkara Breeding Centre, Jhabuwa (India)
- Coordinates: 28°02′12″N 76°36′27″E
- Country: India
- State: Haryana
- District: Rewari district
- Established: 2011
- Founder: All 4 Villages of region (Jhabuwa, Bidawas, Bhadoj & Khijuri)
- Named for: Haryana Government

Government
  - Type: Government
  - Body: Haryana Forest Department

Population
  - Total: 5,000
  - Rank: Higher

Languages
  - Official: Hindi
- Time zone: UTC+5:30 (IST)
- PIN: 123501
- ISO 3166 code: IN-HR
- Vehicle registration: Yes
- Website: www.haryanaforest.gov.in

Peacock & Chinkara Breeding Centre, Jhabuwa is a 750-acre protected peacock (Indian peafowl) and chinkara reserve forest in Jhabuwa village 15 km south of Bawal in Rewari district in the Indian state of Haryana. Jhabuwa is 100 kilometres (62 mi) from Delhi and 70 kilometres (43 mi) from Gurugram and 200 km from Hisar.

== History ==
This centre of Forests Department, Haryana was officially opened on 4 October 2011 by then Chief Minister, Om Prakash Chautala. The state government will be providing about Rs. 20 crore of funding for the centre over the next 20 years.

== Reserve forest ==
The Jhabuwa reserve forest lies between Jhabuwa, Bidawas, Bhadoj and Khijuri villages. Out of 750 acres reserve forest, 80 acres are allocated for the captive breeding of Chinkara and Indian peafowl. 20 Peacocks were tagged, with the help of Bombay Natural History Society, on legs and wing for the long-term study of movement and health. Those were released in the wild in February 2018.

== See also ==
- Masani barrage
- CCS HAU, Bawal campus
