= Rojhuwas =

Rojhuwas, Rewari
- Location within Haryana Location within India
- Coordinates: 28.308948°N 76.609500°E
- Country: India

Government
  - Body: Village panchayat
- Time zone: UTC+5:30 (IST)

Rojhuwas is a village in Jatusana Tehsil in Rewari district of Haryana, India. It belongs to Gurgaon division. It is located 16 kilometres (9.9 mi) north of its District headquarters at Rewari, 2 kilometres (1.2 mi) from Jatusana, and 315 kilometres (196 mi) from the state capital if Chandigarh.
