= Bharawas =

- village
- Location within Haryana Location within India
- Coordinates: 28.1484327°N 76.5676071°E
- Country: India

Government
  - Body: Village panchayat
- Time zone: UTC+5:30 (IST)
- PIN: 123401
- Website: www.rewari.gov.in

Bharawas is a village in Rewari tehsil of Rewari district in the Indian state of Haryana. It lies on NH15 south of Rewari at about 8 kilometres (5.0 mi) on the Rewari-Bawal road.

== History ==
Buddha Prakash, a scholar of the Kurukshetra University, states that Bharawas was likely the seat of the historical Bhadanaka kingdom that was conquered by the 12th century Chahamana king Prithviraj Chauhan. According to Buddha Prakash, this kingdom comprised old Gurgaon district, part of Alwar and Bhiwani tahsil. However, Cynthia Talbot of University of Wisconsin-Madison identifies Bhadanaka territory as the area around Bayana in Bharatpur; historian Dasharatha Sharma identifies it as the present-day Bhiwani to north, Rewari west and Alwar to southwest.

=== Maratha era ===
The Maratha general, Mahadji Scindhia stayed at Rewari in 1787, to regulate the affairs and collect land revenue from here. On Mahadji's departure a rebel mughal courtier of Delhi, Najaf Quli Khan (adopted son of Mirza Najaf Khan), occupied the fort of Gokalgarh, 3 km north of Rewari. Mughal Emperor Shah Alam II marched his army from Delhi to punish the rebellious leader. The Emperor encamped at Bharawas, eight kilometres south of Rewari. He was accompanied by the Begum Samru and her forces from her principal cantonment at Jharsa. On 12 March 1788, Najaf Quli inflicted heavy losses on the Mughals in a night attack. But Begum Samru's artillery proved effective and compelled Njaf Quli to sue for peace.

=== British colonial era: Bharawas cantonment ===
Bharawas district and cantonment: In 1804–05, British created a new district of Bharawas, and in 1805–06, they established a cantonment at Bharawas about 7 km from Rewari. In 1818, Bharawas district was disbanded and its headquarter was relocated to Jharsa in Gurugaon, forming Gurugaon as a new district for the first time. In 1821, Bharawas Cantonment too was abandoned, the civil quarters were relocated to Nasirabad in Ajmer and cavalry to Gurgaon which was named as the Hidayatpur Cantonment. Gurgaon was merely a village till 1818. At Bharawas, there are now remains of two ruinous gunpowder magazines and a cemetery with dilapidated smaller tombs, tomb stones and graves. In the aftermath of Indian Rebellion of 1857, a temporary garrison was also setup near Rewari after Rao Tula Ram and his cousin Rao Gopal Dev forces were defeated.

It now lies in ruins. After the annexation of Gurugram in 1803, the headquarters of civil offices of the district were at Bharawas near Rewari. Gurgaon was then a cavalry station to check the troops of Begum Samru of Jharsa. After the cession of the Ajmer territory the British frontier moved from Haryana to southern Rajasthan, the Bharawas force was transferred to Nasirabad near Ajmer and civil offices were shifted to Gurugram which was made a new district headquarter in 1821. There are British graves mostly without any epitaph, including that of a dog.

=== World wars and 1971 Indo-Pakistan war ===
One of the three highest decorated Indian Naval officers, Commodore Babru Bhan Yadav, was born on 14 September 1928 in the village of Bharawas in the British district of Rewari near Delhi which is now in the state of Haryana. He was the first Indian Navy Officer to be awarded the Maha Vir Chakra (MVC) in 1972 for his actions of bravery and gallantry in the Indo-Pakistani War of 1971. He was also the first Indian Navy officer to be granted the MVC, which is the country's second highest gallantry award, and given for acts of gallantry in the face of enemy, whether on land, at sea or in the air. His father, late Major Bhagwan Singh Yadav, was awarded the MBE and had taken part in both the World wars.

== Demographics ==
As of 2011 India census, Bharawas had a population of 4,728 in 915 households with literacy rate of 81.94% compared to 75.55% of Haryana state.

== Adjacent villages ==
- sulkha

== Prominent residents ==
- Babru Bhan Yadav, MVC
- Major Bhagwan Singh Yadav, MBE

== See also ==
- Sulkha

== Notes ==
- Cynthia Talbot (2015). The Last Hindu Emperor: Prithviraj Cauhan and the Indian Past, 1200–2000. Cambridge University Press. ISBN 9781107118560.
- Dasharatha Sharma (1959). Early Chauhān Dynasties. S. Chand / Motilal Banarsidass. ISBN 9780842606189.
