= Gothra Tappa Dahina =

Gothra Tappa Dahina, Rewari
- Location within Haryana Location within India
- Coordinates: 28.327099°N 76.391130°E
- Country: India

Government
  - Body: Village panchayat

Population (2011)
  - Total: 2,950
- Time zone: UTC+5:30 (IST)
- PIN: 123411
- Website: www.rewari.gov.in

Gothra Tappa Dahina is a village in Jatusana Tehsil, Rewari District, Haryana, India, in Gurgaon Division. It is about 32.8 kilometres (20.4 mi) west of Rewari town on the Rewari-Kanina-Mahendergarh road. Its pin code is 123411 and its postal head office is at Dahina.

Local crops include maize, wheat, and millet.

== Demographics ==
As of the 2011 India census, Gothra Tappa Dahina had a population of 4000 in 578 households. Males (1551) constituted 52.57% of the population and females (1399) 47.42%. Gothra Tappa Dahina had an average literacy (2015) rate of 68.3%, lower than the national average of 74%: male literacy (1185) was 58.8%, and female literacy (830) was 41.19% of total literates (2015). 13.22% of the population were under 6 years of age (390).rajput village

In 2018, health workers reported a ratio of 133 men to every 100 women.

== Adjacent villages ==
- Kanwali
- Dhani Thather Bad
- Nimoth
- Siha
- Zainabad
- Lisan on Kanina-Kosli road
- Lohana
