= Ladhuwas Ahir =

- Location within Haryana Location within India
- Coordinates: 28.205823°N 76.567607°E
- Country: India

Population (2011)
  - Total: 1,298
- Time zone: UTC+5:30 (IST)
- PIN: 123 xxx
- Telephone code: 01274
- Website: www.rewari.gov.in

Ladhuwas Ahir is a village in Rewari district, Haryana, India. It is near Saharanwas village on the Rewari - Kanina - Mahendragarh road. As per 2011 census, there are 275 households. Out of 1,298 persons, 680 are male and 618 are female.
