= Rasgan =

- Location within Haryana Location within India
- Coordinates: 28.189672°N 76.723551°E
- Country: India

Population (2015)
  - Total: 1,600
- Time zone: UTC+5:30 (IST)
- PIN: 122106
- Telephone code: 01274
- Vehicle registration: HR-36
- Website: www.rewari.gov.in

Rasgan is a village in Rewari Tehsil of Rewari district, in the Indian state of Haryana.

== Adjacent villages ==
- Khijuri
- Masani
- Dungarwas
- Nikhri on NH 48 (Old NH08)
- Masani
- Jitpur Istamrar
- Khaliawas
- Bhatsana
- Niganiawas
- Raliawas
