= Zainabad =

- Location within Haryana Location within India
- Coordinates: 28.285798°N 76.380615°E
- Country: India

Government
  - Body: Village panchayat

Population (2011)
  - Total: 5,205 (Male - 2,734 Female - 2,471 )
- Time zone: UTC+5:30 (IST)
- PIN: 123411
- Vehicle registration: HR 36
- Website: www.rewari.gov.in

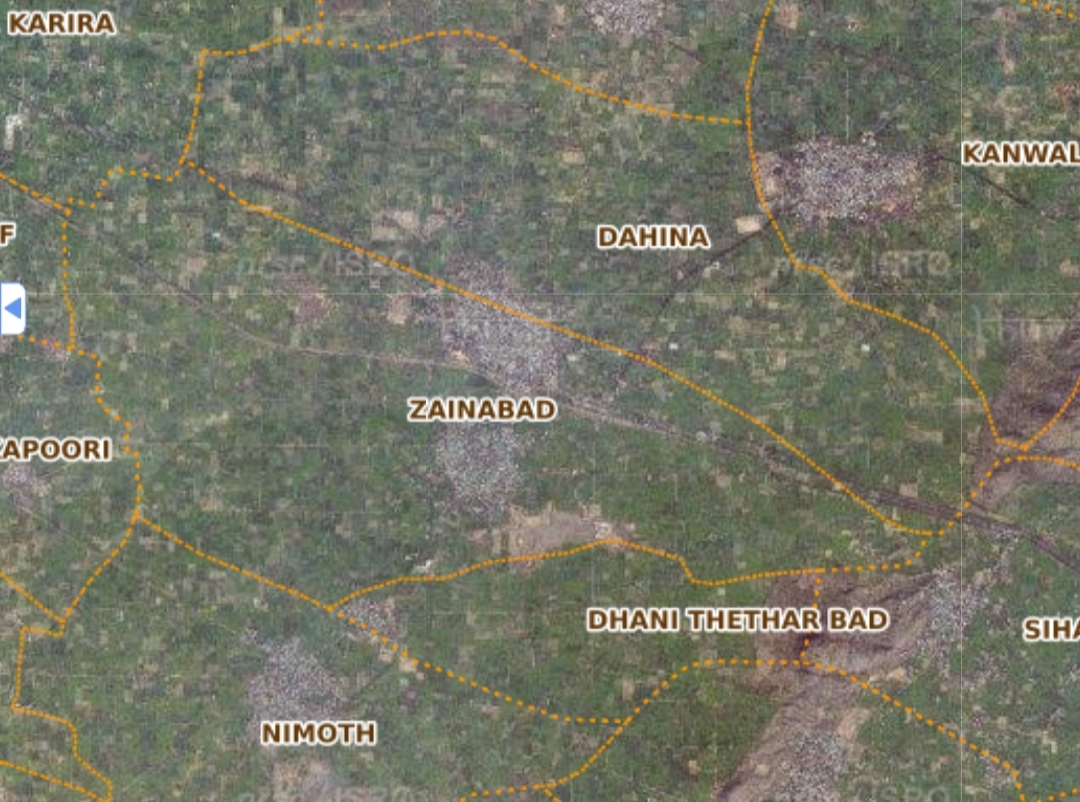

Zainabad is a village located in DAHINA Block of Rewari district in Haryana. Positioned in rural area of Rewari district of Haryana, it is one of the 39 villages of Dahina Block of Rewari district. As per the government records, the village code of Zainabad is 62460. The village has 1072 families.

== Population ==
According to the 2011 census, Zainabad's population is 5205. Out of this, 2734 are males whereas the females count 2471 here. This village has 540 kids in the age group of 0–6 years. Among them 313 are boys and 227 are girls.

== Literacy rate ==
Literacy rate in Zainabad village is 86%. 4685 out of total 5205 population is educated here. Among males the literacy rate is 92% as 2515 males out of total 2734 are educated while female literacy ratio is 73% as 1803 out of total 2471 females are educated in this Village.

== Agriculture ==
The number of working person of Zainabad village is 1908 whereas 3297 are un-employed. And out of 1908 employed people 638 individuals are totally reliant on agriculture.

== Village Panchayat ==
No	Name	Term
1	Ramnarayan	1952-57
2	Ramnarayan	1957-62
3	Ramnarayan	1962-66
4	Khobram patwari	1966-71
5	Punamchand	1971-76
6	Hardawari	1976-81
7	Laldas	1981-86
8	Rawat	1986-91
9	Parmanand+nandh	1991-94
10	Laldas	1994-99
11	Kaushalya devi	2000-05
12	Dayanand+Sarbati devi	2005-10
13	Laldas	2010-16
14	Gopichand	2016-21
15	Bhavna	2022-till

== Transport ==
=== Air ===
The nearest airport is Indira Gandhi International Airport at Palam, New Delhi, 107 km away, for all domestic and international flights.

=== Railway ===
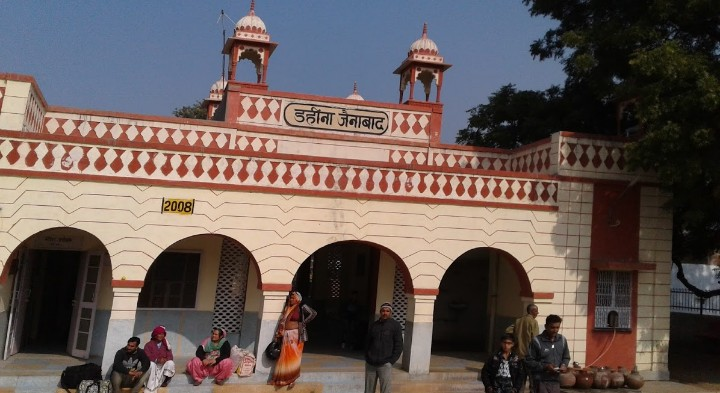
Dahina Zainabad Railway Station

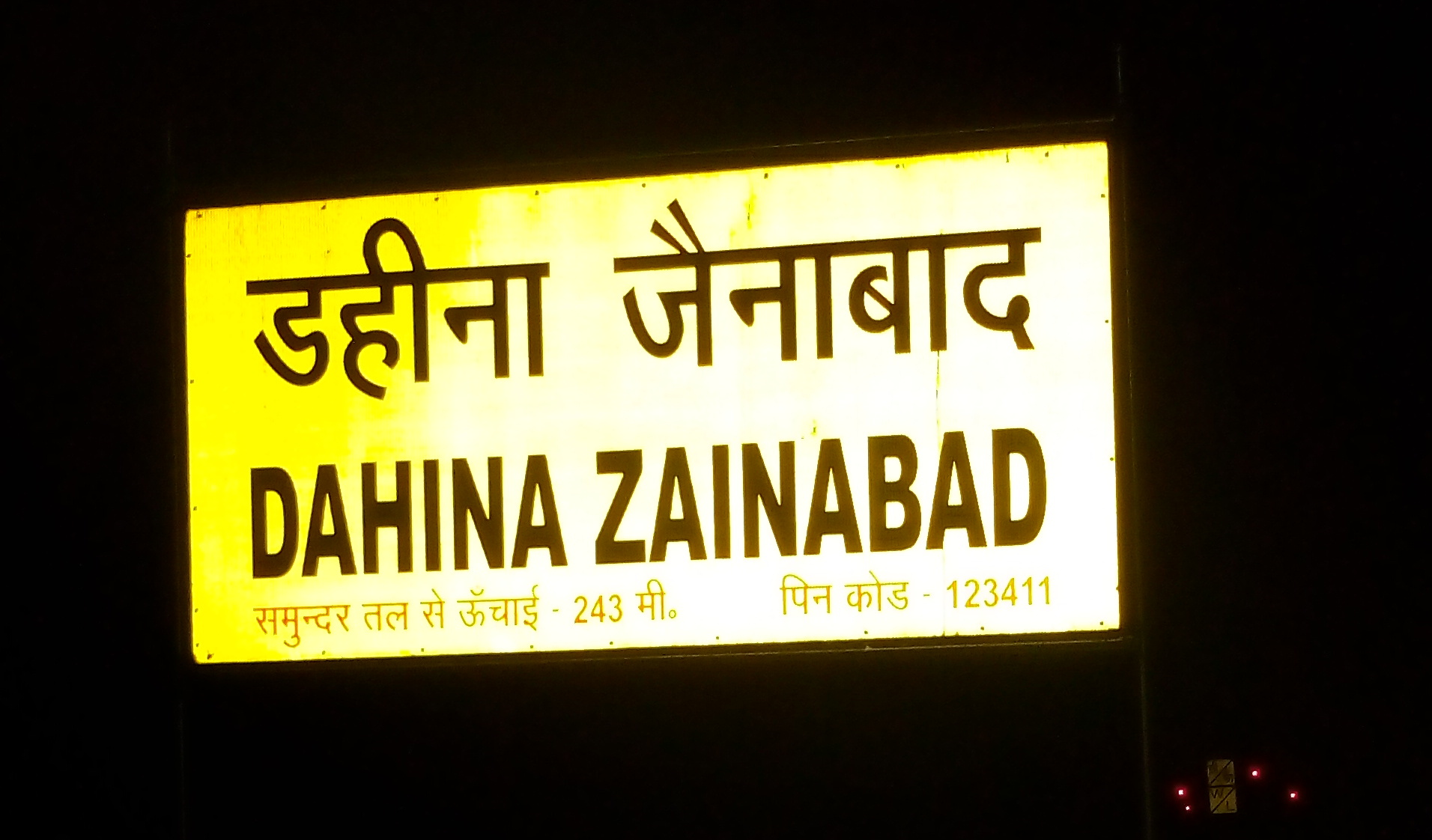
Railway station

The nearest railway station is Dahina Zainabad. On the route of Rewari - Mahendergarh

=== Road ===
Zainabad is connected by SH-24 Rewari-Dahina-Kanina-Mahendragarh road and Dahina to Kund road. Rewari is 25 km, Mahendergarh is 29 km and Kund is 19 km away from Zainabad.

Nearest Bus Stand is Zainabad Dahina

== Education ==
Zainabad has one engineering college, one degree collage, one senior secondary school, two primary schools and two secondary schools

- The Rao Birender Singh State Institute of Engineering & Technology, Rewari (RBSSIETR) is a public Engineering institution established by the Government of Haryana to promote technical education in the state.
- Shaheed Capt. D.K Khola Public School
- Shaheed Capt. D.K Kh ola degree college
- Govt Girls Sr. Sec. School
- Govt Girls primary school
- Modern Public School Zainabad

== Temples ==
- Baba Udhodas Temple
- Hanuman Mandir
- Shivji Temple
- Sedh Mata Temple
- Holika Temple
- Santoshi mata Temple
- Baba Jharveer Goga Tample
- Baba Bhaiya Temple
