= Rewari (Rural) =

- Census town
- Location in Haryana, India Rewari (Rural) (India)
- Coordinates: 28°11′N 76°37′E
- Country: India
- State: Haryana
- District: Rewari

Population (2001)
  - Total: 4,453

Languages
  - Official: Hindi
- Time zone: UTC+5:30 (IST)
- ISO 3166 code: IN-HR
- Vehicle registration: HR
- Website: haryana.gov.in

Rewari (Rural) is a census town in Rewari district in the Indian state of Haryana.

== Demographics ==
As of 2001 India census, Rewari (Rural) had a population of 4453. Males constitute 54% of the population and females 46%. Rewari (Rural) has an average literacy rate of 68%, higher than the national average of 59.5%: male literacy is 77%, and female literacy is 57%. In Rewari (Rural), 14% of the population is under 6 years of age.
