= Gughod =

Gughod (Rewari)
- Location within Haryana Location within India
- Coordinates: 28.390659°N 76.516306°E
- Country: India
- State: Haryana
- District: Rewari district

Population (2011)
  - Total: 2,431
- Postal code: 123401
- ISO 3166 code: IN-HR
- Website: www.rewari.gov.in

Gughod (or Gugodh) is a village in Rewari mandal of Nahar Block of Kosli Subdivision, Rewari district, Haryana, India. It is 6 kilometres (3.7 mi) from Kosli Subdivision Headquarter on the approach Road.

== Demographics ==
As of 2011 India census, Gughod had a population of 2431 in 492 households. Males (1275) constitute 52.44% of the population and females (1156) 47.55%. Gughod has an average literacy (1673) rate of 68.81%, lower than the national average of 74%: male literacy (1007) is 60.19%, and female literacy (666) is 39.8%. In Gughod, 12.91% of the population is under 6 years of age (314).
