= Jaitpur Shekhpur =

- village
- Location within Haryana Location within India
- Coordinates: 28.292535°N 76.685887°E
- Country: India

Government
  - Body: Village panchayat
- Elevation: 296 m (971 ft)

Population (2011 Census)
  - Total: 1,992
- Time zone: UTC+5:30 (IST)
- Vehicle registration: HR-26, HR-36, HR-76

Jaitpur Shekhpur is a village in the Rewari district in the Haryana state of India. It Is Located on Gurgaon-Rewari Border. Its Pincode Is 122502 . The village is dominated by Ahirs of affariya gotra .
