= Divya Mittal =

- Born: Divya; 23 November 1983 (age 42); Rewari district, Haryana,India
- Citizenship: Indian
- Occupations: Divya Mittal is a politician and former Indian Administrative Service (IAS)
- Years active: Indian Administrative Service (IAS) (2013-2026)
- Known for: Politician
- Political party: Jan-niti Bharat Party
- Spouse: Gagandeep Singh Dhillon
- Children: 2 Daughters

Divya Mittal is a former Indian Administrative Service (IAS) officer and an Indian politician. She belonged to the 2013 batch of the Uttar Pradesh cadre. After serving in various administrative capacities across Uttar Pradesh for over 13 years, she took voluntary retirement from the civil services in August 2026. In October 2026, she entered active politics and founded the Jan-niti Bharat Party.

== Early life and education ==
Divya Mittal was born in Delhi into a middle-class family. Her ancestral roots are traced back to Rewari, Haryana. • Bachelor of Technology (B.Tech): She graduated in Engineering Physics from the Indian Institute of Technology (IIT) Delhi (Class of 2001–2005). • Post Graduate Diploma in Management (PGDM): She earned her management degree from the Indian Institute of Management (IIM) Bangalore (Class of 2005–2007). • Certifications: She also earned a micro-certification in Data, Economics, and Development Policy from the Massachusetts Institute of Technology (MITx)

== Corporate career ==
Prior to joining the civil services, Mittal had a career in global finance. She moved to London, United Kingdom, where she worked as an Exotic Derivatives Trader for the global financial services firm JP Morgan. She later returned to India to prepare for the Union Public Service Commission (UPSC) Civil Services Examination.

== Bureaucratic career (IAS) ==
Mittal cleared the UPSC Civil Services Examination with an All India Rank of 68 (AIR 68). She was allocated the Indian Administrative Service (IAS) under the Uttar Pradesh cadre in 2013. During her 13-year tenure, she held several administrative positions under the Government of Uttar Pradesh: • District Magistrate (DM): She served as the District Magistrate of Sant Kabir Nagar, Mirzapur, and Devaria districts. • Key Projects: During her tenure as DM Mirzapur, she gained prominence for resolving a decades-old water crisis in Lahuria Deh, a remote hill village, by executing a dedicated tap-water pipeline network. • Other Appointments: She served as the Chief Executive Officer (CEO) of the Uttar Pradesh Rural Roads Development Authority (UPRRDA), Joint Managing Director of UPSIDA, Vice-Chairman of the Bareilly Development Authority, and Special Secretary in the Department of Revenue in Lucknow. • Awards: During her foundational training at the Lal Bahadur Shastri National Academy of Administration (LBSNAA), she received the Ashok Bambawale Memorial Award for outstanding performance.

== Resignation and Entry into Politics ==
On 30 August 2026, Mittal announced her resignation from the Indian Administrative Service citing personal reasons and a desire to serve the public through alternative means. Her voluntary retirement request was formally accepted by the Central Government in September 2026. On 15 October 2026, she announced her entry into mainstream politics by launching a new independent political platform named the Jan-niti Bharat Party. Her party announced its intention to contest the 2027 Uttar Pradesh Legislative Assembly elections.
