= Doki =

Doki can refer to:

- Doki (TV series), an animated children's television series, or the eponymous character from Discovery Kids Latin America
- Doki, one of the two central characters in the Korean cartoon There She Is!!
- Doki (app), a mobile app designed to teach languages

== See also ==
- Doki doki (disambiguation)
- Dhoki (disambiguation)
- Doki Doki Literature Club!
