= Gindokhar =

- Village
- Location in Rewari, Haryana, India Gindokhar (India)
- Coordinates: 28°N 76°E
- Country: India
- State: Haryana
- District: Rewari

Languages
  - Official: Hindi
- Time zone: UTC+5:30 (IST)
- PIN: 123401
- ISO 3166 code: IN-HR
- Vehicle registration: HR36
- Nearest city: Rewari
- Sex ratio: 1:1 ♂/♀
- Literacy: 70%
- Website: www.rewari.gov.in

Gindokhar is a village in Rewari Tehsil, Rewari district, of Haryana, India. It is in Gurgaon Division, located 7 kilometres (4.3 mi) north of the district headquarters at Rewari, and 8 kilometres (5.0 mi) from Rewari. The nearest railway station is Kishanghad Balawas Railway Station.

The village is 323 kilometres (201 mi) from State capital Chandigarh. Lakhnor 2 kilometres (1.2 mi), Balawas Jamapur 2 kilometres (1.2 mi), Kishangarh 2 kilometres (1.2 mi), Bhudpur (2 km), Lisana 3 kilometres (1.9 mi) are the nearby villages to Gindokhar.
