= Bariawas =

- village
- Location within Haryana Location within India
- Coordinates: 28.153420°N 76.661485°E
- Country: India

Government
  - Body: Village panchayat
- Time zone: UTC+5:30 (IST)
- PIN: 12x xxx
- Website: www.rewari.gov.in

Bariawas is a village in Rewari mandal of Rewari district in the Indian state of Haryana. It is near Chhuriawas village Rewari at about 8.3 kilometres (5.2 mi) on the approach Rewari- Garhi Bolni Road.

== History ==
In 1803, subsequent to the culmination of Anglo-Maratha Wars into the Treaty of Surji-Anjangaon after the defeat of Maratha Empire, the British Raj firmly established its control over Delhi. They formed three cantonments at equidistance in Haryana, i.e. Karnal, Hansi and Bharawas. All the three cantonments do not exist anymore. But their historical remains are still commemorating those days. Karnal cantt was shifted to Ambala in 1841–43. Bharawas to Nasirabad-Ajmer in 1821. And Hansi was granted to Col. James Skinner, and cavalry was merged into Skinners Horse.

- Bharawas Cantonment:

In 1804–05, British created a new district of Bharawas, and in 1805–06, they established a cantonment at Bharawas about 7 km from Rewari. In 1818, Bharawas district was disbanded and its headquarter was relocated to Gurugaon forming Gurugaon as a new district for the first time. In 1821, Bharawas Cantonment too was abandoned, the civil quarters were relocated to Nasirabad in Ajmer and cavalry to Gurgaon which was named as the Hidayatpur Cantonment. Gurgaon was merely a village till 1818. At Bharawas, there are now remains of two ruinous gunpowder magazines and a cemetery with dilapidated smaller tombs, tomb stones and graves.

- Karnal Cantonment:

It has been a walled town as far as its history can be traced. It is said that it had 10 gates. Some of these remain, i.e., Karn Gate, Kalandari Gate, Arjun Gate, Subhash Gate, Jaataan Gate, Jundla Gate, Baanson Gate, Dyalpura Gate, and a citadel.

Karnal sprang into prominence in 1739 when Persian emperor Nadir Shah defeated and captured the Mughal ruler Muhammad Shah in the Battle of Karnal. Raja Gopal Singh of Jind seized Karnal in 1763, and the Marathas established themselves at Karnal in 1785. Skirmishes followed between the Marathas and the Sikhs and in 1795, the Marathas finally wrested the city from Raja Bhag Singh of Jind and made it over to the British-Irish military commander George Thomas, who took part in the fight.

The British established a cantonment in Karnal (then also known as Kurnaul, Karnaul, Kurnaul) called Karnal Cantonment in 1805 AD but later abandoned it due to an outbreak of malaria & this very same Karnal Cantonment was shifted to Ambala and later it was known as Ambala Cantonment established in 1843 AD.

European Cemetery at this cantonment houses about 500 graves of European soldiers. An associated cemetery has British graves including that of Commander-in-Chief of British India who died here while on his way during the tumultuous events of Indian Rebellion of 1857. The inscriptions on the graves date back to 1811 CE to 1840 CE. The cemetery is located within a gated enclosure, with a boundary wall. While most of the graves are simple, raised on brick platforms, others have ornament monument around them. Large vegetation and plants are growing there, many graves are not visible because of tall grass and plants, there is no facility to enter the graves area which is in the dire need of conservation. Karnal was annexed by the Raja of Jind in 1763 AD and was taken from him by George Thomas in 1797. The British established a cantonment in 1811 AD but abandoned it after 30 years due to the outbreak of malaria. It was captured by the British in 1805 AD and made over to Muhamdi Khan (Mandal). On Karnal's being formed into a British cantonment, the fort which had been built by Raja Gajpat Singh of Jind, was taken over by the British and converted into a residence for Dost Muhammad Khan Amir of Kabul. The fort was used as a jail, as quarters for native cavalry and as poor house. In 1862, it was made over to the education department, when the district school was moved into it from the city.

- Hansi cantonment:

About 1820, Hansi was granted as Jageer to Col. James Skinner of Indian origin, who held it till his death in 1841.

- Ambala Cantonment: This cantonment was established in 1843. It is said that after the abandonment of Karnal cantonment in 1841 on account of the prevalence of malaria, the troops were marching to a place near Sirhind which had been selected as a possible site for the new cantonment. After salubrious halt of two days, it was decided to turn the scales in favour of a cantonment at Ambala. Not long after the cantonment was located here a Garrison church, one of the finest in the region was also constructed with a seating capacity of 1,000 persons. It now stands in ruins, the only remanent of the building being a bell tower. The lawns are spread over a vast area. The Sirhind club, founded in 1891, is located on the Mall road and has a large membership. The Ambala Cantonmentwas established in 1843 after the British were forced to leave its Karnal Cantonment following the malaria epidemic of 1841–42 in as there were not any known effective means to control malaria epidemic in those days. The cantonment houses the '2 Corps', one of the three Strike Corps of the Indian Army. Ambala was given the status of a district in 1847, formed by the merging of the jagir estates of hitherto independent chieftains whose territories had lapsed or had been confiscated by the British Indian Government. In its 160 years of existence as a district, Ambala has witnessed many changes in its boundaries. Previously it extended across tehsils of Ambala, Saphera, Jagadhri, Pipli, Kharar, Mohali, Roparand Nalagarh. Kalka-cum-Kurari State, Pinjore, Mani Majra, Kasauli& Sanawarwere also merged into the district at different times. Ambala Air Force Baseis one of the oldest and largest airbases that were inherited from the British by the IAF. It was from this airbase that Spitfiresand Harvardsflown by Instructors of the Advanced Flying Training School took part in the 1947-48 Kashmir Operations. Subsequently, Ambala was the front line airfield for many years. It was home to various aircraft that were inducted into the Indian Air Force. Vampires, Ouragans, Hunters, etc. all flew from this base. The airbase was briefly attacked in 1965 by B-57 bombers of the Pakistan Air Force. Today, the Airbase houses the '7 Wing' with squadrons of Jaguarsand MiG-21Bisons. A unit of the French-made Dassault Rafalewill be based at Ambala air base. In November 1949 Mahatma Gandhi'sassassin, Nathuram Godsewas hanged at Ambala Central Jail along with Narayan Apte, a co-conspirator. Ambala Cantt is also mentioned in Kim (novel) by Rudyard Kipling.

"Rani Ka Talab" Rani Ka Talab is one of the historic testimonies, of the town built by Raja Ranjit Singh of Chhachhrauli. The 400 year old pond is positioned within Ambala Cantonment. and is currently under the authority of Indian Army. Along with the pond, there is an ancient Shiv Mandir and Devi Mandir, managed by the Indian Army.

According to historians, the king of Chhachhrauli dug up two ponds, named one was called Raja Ka Talab and, whereas the other one was Rani Ka Talab. Raja Ka Talab was turned into a modern park, known today as a Patel Park., which was called Company Bagh during British regime.

Construction of both the ponds was identical with both featuring Lord Shiva temple on its banks.

Other cantonment: British also set up Kasauli, Shimla, Dagshai and Sabathuas hill stations for recuperation of troops. Kasauli in Solan district is a cantonment town in Himachal Pradesh, established by the British Raj in 1842 as a Colonial hill station, 94 km from Ambala Cantonment and the oldest Post Box set up by Britishers are still available here. DAGSHAI (38 km from Pinjore) : A one time British cantonment this small town is surrounded by pine trees, has an old church. KASAULI (47 km from Pinjore) : A charming hill station with lots of old world charms. SABATHU (55 km from Pinjore): Still a cantonment, it also has the remains of a Gorkha fort.

In the aftermath of Indian Rebellion of 1857, a temporary garrison was also set up near Rewari after Rao Tula Ram and his cousin Gopal Dev forces were defeated. It now lies in ruins.

== Demographics ==
As of 2011 India census, Bariawas had a population of 753 in 144 households. Males (387) constitute 51.39% of the population and females (366) 48.6%. Bariawas has an average literacy(506) rate of 67.19%, less than the national average of 74%: male literacy(306) is 60.47%, and female literacy(200) is 39.52% of total literates (506). In Bariawas, 15.8% of the population is under 6 years of age (119).

== Adjacent villages ==
- Bhudla
- Kathuwas
- Salhawas
- Sangwari
- Ladhuwas
- Majra Gurdas
- Chhuriawas
- Lalpur

== See also ==
- Bharawas
