= Babroli =

Babroli, Rewari Babroli
- Babroli
- Location within Haryana Location within India
- Coordinates: 28.351354°N 76.481612°E
- Country: India

Government
  - Body: Village panchayat

Population (2011)
  - Total: 2,000
- Time zone: UTC+5:30 (IST)
- Website: www.rewari.gov.in

Babroli is situated in Kosli tehsil, Rewari district, Haryana, India. It is one of 54 villages in Kosli tehsil. Nangal pathani is a nearby railway station.
