= Motla Khurd =

Tarun yadav Motliya
- Location within Haryana Location within India
- Coordinates: 28.287775°N 76.469322°E
- Country: India

Government
  - Body: Village panchayat
- Time zone: UTC+5:30 (IST)
- PIN: 123411
- Website: www.rewari.gov.in

Motla Khurd is a village in Jatusana Tehsil, Rewari district, Haryana. It is 19 kilometres (12 mi) north of District headquarters at Rewari and 9 kilometres (5.6 mi) from Jatusana. It is 320 kilometres (200 mi) from the state capital, Chandigarh. Its postal head office is Dahina.
