= Boria Kamalpur =

- Location within Haryana Location within India
- Coordinates: 28.253300°N 76.569052°E
- Country: India

Population (2011)
  - Total: 2,057
- Time zone: UTC+5:30 (IST)
- PIN: 123401
- Website: www.rewari.gov.in,

Boria Kamalpur is a village in Rewari mandal of Jatusana Block, in the Indian state of Haryana. It is near Budhpur village Rewari about 9.7 kilometres (6.0 mi) on Drive via NH 71B, from Rewari Berli Kosli Road on approach road. It is also named as Bodia Kamal Pur

== Demographics ==
As of 2011 India census, Boria Kamalpur had a population of 2,057 in 426 households. Males (1086) constitute 52.79% of the population and females (971) 47.20%. Budhpur has an average literacy rate(1504) of 73.11%, lower than the national average of 74%: male literacy (884) is 58.77%, and female (620) literacy is 41.22%. In Boria Kamalpur, 10.64% of the population is under 6 years of age(219) .

== Adjacent Villages ==
- Budhpur
- Rasooli
