= Lisana =

- Location within Haryana Location within India
- Coordinates: 28.234945°N 76.615277°E
- Country: India

Population (2011)
  - Total: 1,852
- Time zone: UTC+5:30 (IST)
- PIN: 123 xxx
- Website: www.rewari.gov.in

Lisana is a village in Rewari of Rewari block, in the Indian state of Haryana.

== Polytechnic ==
It has a Government Polytechnic at 12.5 kilometres (7.8 mi) from Rewari Bus stand on old Rewari Rohtak road.

== Demographics of 2011 ==
As of 2011 India census, Lisana, Rewari had a population of 1852 in 346 households. Males (997) constitute 53.83% of the population and females (855) 46.16%. Lisana has an average literacy (1226) rate of 66.19%, lower than the national average of 74%: male literacy (753) is 61.41%, and female literacy (473) is 38.58% of total literates(1226). In Lisana, 14.09% of the population is under 6 years of age (261).

== Adjacent villages ==
- Gokalgarh
- Bikaner
- Newgone
- Gindokhar
- Kaluwas
- Ghasera
