= Motla Kalan =

Motla Kalan, Rewari
- Location within Haryana Location within India
- Coordinates: 28.302109°N 76.469322°E
- Country: India

Government
  - Body: Village panchayat
- Time zone: UTC+5:30 (IST)
- PIN: 123411
- Website: www.rewari.gov.in

Motla Kalan is a village in tehsil Rewari , Rewari district, Haryana, India. It belongs to Gurgaon division. It is located 18 kilometres (11 mi) north of the district headquarters at Rewari, and 5 kilometres (3.1 mi) from Jatusana. Its postal head office is at Dahina.
