= Parkhotampur =

- village
- Location in Rewari, Haryana, India Parkhotampur (India)
- Coordinates: 28°31′N 76°49′E
- Country: India
- State: Haryana
- District: Rewari

Government
  - Type: Panchayat raj
  - Body: Gram panchayat

Languages
  - Official: Hindi
- Time zone: UTC+5:30 (IST)
- Telephone code: 01281
- Vehicle registration: HR-36
- Nearest city: Rewari

Parkhotampur is a village in Jatusana Tehsil in Rewari district of Haryana. It belongs to Gurgaon Division.

== Demography ==
As of 2011 India census, Parkhotampur village had a population of 2205 in 467 households. Males (1210) constitute 54.87% of the population and females (995) 45.12%. Prakhotampur has an average literacy (1424) rate of 64.58%, less than the national average of 74%: male literacy (874) is 61.37%, and female literacy (550) is 38.62%. Persons belonging to Scheduled Castes (SC) are 1273 and out of which 675 are male and 598 are female. In Prakhotampur, 10.75% of the population is under 6 years of age (270) and 162 are male children and 108 are female children.
