= Baliar Khurd =

- Village
- Location in India Baliar Khurd (India)
- Coordinates: 28.207°N 76.4134°E
- Country: India
- State: Haryana
- District: Rewari district
- Municipality: Rewari
- ISO 3166 code: IN-HR

Baliar Khurd is a village in Rewari district in Haryana, India. it is situated on Rewari-Delhi road after Hansaka village. Khurd and Kalan are Persian language words which mean small and big respectively. When two villages have the same name they are distinguished by adding Kalan (big) or Khurd (small) to the end of the village name.
