= Doki doki =

Doki Doki or doki-doki (Japanese: ドキドキ) is a term for the sound of a beating heart in Japanese sound symbolism.

Doki doki or variants may also refer to:

== Film, anime, and manga ==
- Doki-Doki (short film) (2003), by Chris Eska
- DokiDoki! PreCure (2013), a Toei anime
- Doki Doki Wildcat Engine (2000), a Doraemons anime
- Doki Doki School Hours, a Tamami Momose manga and anime
- Doki Doki Densetsu: Mahoujin Guruguru (2000), an anime based on Magical Circle Guru Guru
- A manga-oriented imprint of French comics house Bamboo Édition

== Music ==
- "Dokki Doki! Love Mail" (2001), a song by Aya Matsuura
- "Doki Doki Morning" (2011), a song by Babymetal
- An informal name for Mitsukuni Haninozuka's theme song from Ouran High School Host Club
- "Doki Doki" (1995), a song by Judy and Mary

== Video games ==
- Doki Doki Majo Shinpan! (2007), a Nintendo DS video game
- Doki Doki Penguin Land (1985), a Sega video game
- Doki-Doki Universe (2013), a PlayStation video game
- Doki Doki Literature Club! (2017), a visual novel by Team Salvato
- Doki! Doki! Yūenchi: Crazy Land Daisakusen (1991), a Nintendo Famicom game
- Yume Kōjō: Doki Doki Panic (1987), a Nintendo game called Super Mario Bros. 2 outside Japan

== See also ==
- Doki (disambiguation)
- Rec: Doki Doki Seiyū Paradise (2006), a visual novel based on the manga Rec
- Tiny Toon Adventures 3: Doki Doki Sports Festival Japanese title of Tiny Toon Adventures: Wacky Sports Challenge
