= Khushpura =

- Location within Haryana Location within India
- Coordinates: 28.318474°N 76.489564°E
- Country: India

Government
  - Body: Village panchayat
- Time zone: UTC+5:30 (IST)
- Website: www.rewari.gov.in

Khushpura is a village in the tehsil of Dahina, Rewari District, in the Gurgaon Division of the state of Haryana, India.
