= Baliar Kalan =

Baliar kalan is a village in Rewari district and Gurgaon division in the state of Haryana, India. It is less populated village with a subtotal of 110 houses and the gram panchayat of village mudiakhera is also combined with Baliar kalan. Dharuhera is the nearest town to Baliar kalan and national highway 8 and 71 are also at short distance from it.
