= Manethi =

- village
- Location within Haryana Location within India
- Coordinates: 28.1630313°N 76.3753301°E
- Country: India

Government
  - Body: Village panchayat
- Elevation: 296 m (971 ft)
- Time zone: UTC+5:30 (IST)
- PIN: 123102
- Website: www.rewari.gov.in

Manethi is a village in Khol and development block of Rewari district in southern region of Haryana state of India. It is located off NH26 about 20 km southeast of Mahendragarh, 25 km west of Rewari, 30 km east of Narnaul, 63 km west of Manesar, 79 km north of Alwar, 90 km west of Gurugram, 96 northeast of Sariska Tiger Reserve, 110 km west of national capital Delhi and 335 km southwest of the state capital Chandigarh. Kund Railway Station and Kathuwas Railway Station are the nearest stations.

== Demographics ==
As of 2011 India census, Manethi had a population of 5,070 in 987 households, 2,649 males, 2,421 females, Female Sex Ratio is of 914 against state average of 879, and literacy rate of 81.24% against the state average of 75.55% (Male - 91.52% and female 70.34%).

== Education and research ==
In February 2019, the AIIMS Rewari was announced to be located in Manethi, which will be functional by February 2023.

== See also ==
- Delhi–Alwar Regional Rapid Transit System, will pass near Manethi
