= Patauda =

Patauda पाटौदा
- village
- Location in Haryana, India Patauda (India)
- Coordinates: 28.47°N 76.42°E
- Country: India
- State: Haryana
- District: Jhajjar District

Government
  - Body: Gram Panchayat Patauda
  - Sarpanch: Mr. Govind yadav
  - Lok Sabha: Rohtak Lok Sabha Constituency
  - Vidhan Sabha: Badli Constituency
  - M.P.: Deependra singh hooda
  - M.L.A.: Kuldeep Vats

Area
  - Total: 4.54 km^{2} (1.75 sq mi)
- Elevation: 224 m (735 ft)

Population (2001)
  - Total: 7,447
  - Density: 1,640/km^{2} (4,250/sq mi)

Languages
  - Official: Hindi
- Time zone: UTC+5:30 (IST)
- PIN: 124108 124108
- ISO 3166 code: IN-HR
- Vehicle registration: HR-14
- Website: haryana.gov.in

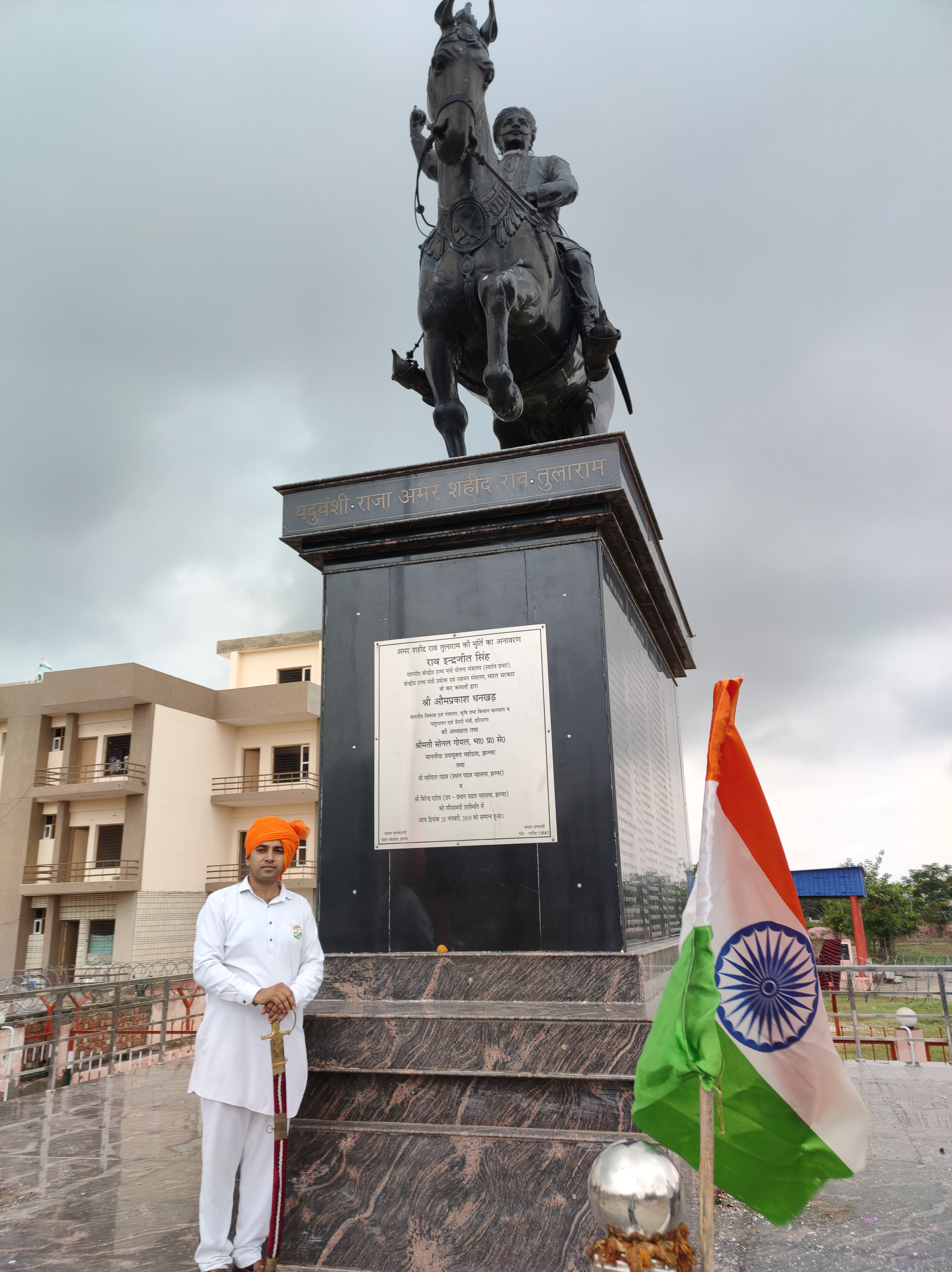
Raja Rao Tula Singh Bahadur (worshipped in Delhi-NCR)

Patauda is a village of Jhajjar District in the Indian state of Haryana located in the south of National Capital Territory of Delhi, 78 kilometres south of New Delhi and 12 kilometres from Pataudi.There is one more village called Patauda Khera is also under the Patauda panchayat. Majority are Ahir community.

Patauda village is a part of Badli Constituency. Kuldeep Vats of Congress is the MLA from Badli Constituency.

Population

Census Parameter	Census Data
Total Population	7447
Total No of Houses	1409
Female Population %	46.8 % ( 3482)
Total Literacy rate %	68.3 % ( 5089)
Female Literacy rate	27.8 % ( 2067)
Scheduled Tribes Population %	0.0 % ( 0)
Scheduled Caste Population %	18.9 % ( 1404)
Working Population %	30.4 %
Child(0 -6) Population by 2011	958
Girl Child(0 -6) Population % by 2011	43.4 % ( 416)
