= Rasooli =

Rasooli is an Afghan surname. Notable people with the surname include:

- Anisa Rasooli (born 1969), Afghan judge
- Darwish Rasooli (born 1999), Afghan cricketer

== See also ==
- Nisbat-e-Rasooli
