= Lakhnor =

Lakhnor, Rewari
- Location within Haryana Location within India
- Coordinates: 28.225335°N 76.590722°E
- Country: India

Government
  - Body: Village panchayat

Population (2011)
  - Total: 976
- Time zone: UTC+5:30 (IST)
- Vehicle registration: HR
- Website: www.rewari.gov.in

Lakhnor is a village in Rewari Tehsil of Rewari District of Haryana State, India. It is a part of Gurugram Division. It is located 4 km west to District headquarters. Its Pin code is 123401 and postal head office is Bhudpur, a nearby village.

== Demographics ==
As of the 2011 India census, Lakhnor had a population of 976 in 197 households. Males (513) constituted 52.56% of the population and females (463) 47.43%. Lakhnor had an average literacy (714) rate of 93.54%, way higher than the national average of 74%: male literacy (495) was 96.49%, and female literacy (418) was 90.28% of total literates (913). 9.22% of the population was under 6 years of age (90).

A few decades ago the most prevalent profession of villagers was agriculture, but the new generation has drifted away from it. The village is now home to people in a wide range of professions.

Lakhnor has a government primary school and a private sr. sec. school.
