= Kulana, Jhajjar =

Kulana
- Village
- Location in Haryana, India Kulana (India)
- Country: India
- State: Haryana
- Region: North India
- District: Jhajjar

Languages
  - Official: Hindi
- Time zone: UTC+5:30 (IST)
- PIN: 124108
- ISO 3166 code: IN-HR
- Vehicle registration: HR-14
- Website: haryana.gov.in

Kulana is a village in Jhajjar District of Haryana, India. It is on the Jhajjar-Rewari road. As of 2017, the population was around 2,500 and the number of voters was 1,350.

The village one government school[1][2] and its postal code is 124108. The postal code is 124108. Dr Rajender Singh Chauhan, Sr Prof and Head Ophthalmology &Director of Regional Institute of Ophthalmology at PGIMS Rohtak and his wife Dr Meenakshi Prof and Head of Gynae at PGIMS Rohtak are prominent personality of Villege Kulana. The Asian Games silver and bronze medallist rower **Dushyant Singh Chauhan** is from Kulana. The village also features a statue of **Prithviraj Chauhan**.

== Adjacent villages ==
- Gurawra
- Amadalpur
- Machhrauli
- Koka
- Patauda
