= Gokalgarh, Rewari =

Gokalgarh
- Location within Haryana Location within India
- Coordinates: 28.246772°N 76.617645°E
- Country: India

Population (2011)
  - Total: 83,310
- Time zone: UTC+5:30 (IST)
- PIN: 123401
- Website: www.rewari.gov.in

Gokalgarh is a village Near Hanuman Mandir Astal in Rewari block, in the Indian state of Haryana. It is a village at about 10 kilometres (6.2 mi) from Rewari city and is situated on Rewari- Jhajjar District Road.

== Railway Station ==
It has a railway station from Rewari, It is first on Rewari-Rohtak line. Its railway station is 13.6 kilometres (8.5 mi) away from Rewari Bus stand.

== Gokalgarh Fort ==
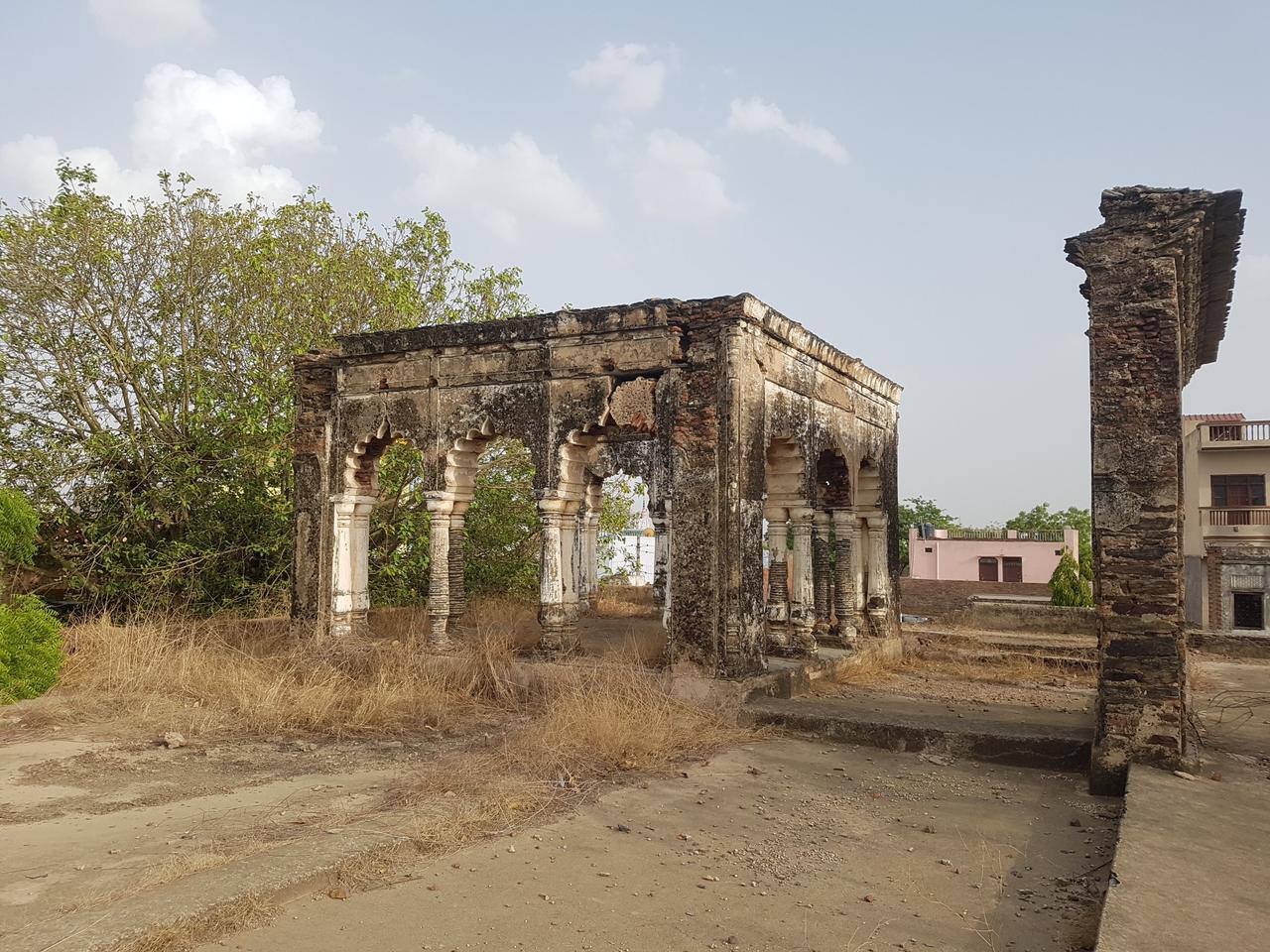
Gokulgarh Fort

In Mughal times, although Rewari was the headquarters of a Sarkar or district of the empire, its Ahir Rajás appear to have enjoyed a large measure of independence, paying tribute at a fixed rate to the emperors, and coining their own money. Rao Gujarmal built the fort of Gokalgarh, two miles from Rewari (Ahirwal), some of the bastions of which still remain as indications of the former strength and size of the place, and which gave its name to the coinage known as Gokal sicca that was still in circulation at Farrukhnagar in the time of the Mutiny, passing for 13 or 14 annas of our money. Rao Bal Kishan who fought against Nadirshah at Karnal in year 1739, single handedly fought against 75000 well equipped soldiers.

== Demographics of 2011 ==
As of 2011 India census, Gokalgarh is a large village with total 12750 families residing. The Gokalgarh village has population of 6331 of which 3341 are males while 2990 are females as per Population Census 2011. In Gokalgarh village population of children with age 0-6 is 762 which makes up 12.04% of total population of village. Average Sex Ratio of Gokalgarh village is 895 which is higher than Haryana state average of 879. Child Sex Ratio for the Gokalgarh as per census is 736, lower than Haryana average of 834.

Gokalgarh village has higher literacy rate compared to Haryana. In 2011, literacy rate of Gokalgarh village was 81.88% compared to 75.55% of Haryana. In Gokalgarh Male literacy stands at 93.49% while female literacy rate was 69.25%.

As per constitution of India and Panchyati Raaj Act, Gokalgarh village is administrated by Sarpanch (Head of Village) who is elected representative of village.

== Adjacent villages ==
- Kaluwas
- Dhoki
- Guraora
- Kulana
- Lisana
- Bikaner
