= Ghasera =

Ghasera Gandhi Gram Ghasera
- Village
- Location within Haryana Location within India
- Coordinates: 28.1362471°N 77.0765927°E
- Country: India
- State: Haryana
- District: Mewat district

Government
  - Type: Local government
  - Body: Gram Panchayat
- Elevation: 199 m (653 ft)

Population (2011)
  - Total: 15,147
- Demonym: Mewati

Languages
- Time zone: UTC+5:30 (IST)
- Postal code: 122107
- ISO 3166 code: IN-HR
- Vehicle registration: HR
- Website: haryana.gov.in

Gandhi Gram Ghasera or Ghasera is a village in Nuh district of Haryana state in northern India. It is dominated by Meos. Gandhi was added to its name after it was visited by Mahatma Gandhi who asked the predominantly Muslim Meos to not migrate to Pakistan.

== History ==
The majority of villagers are Muslim Meos who claim descent from Hindu Lord Rama. These Meos belong to Dhaingal Pal, which is also known as Ghasera Pal and Bargujar Pal. This Pal is prominent in Nuh district and it had originated from the Raiseena village in Gurugram district (also spelt Raisina, and not to be confused with Raisina Hill in Delhi).

=== 18th century ===
The ruined Ghasera Fort lies at Ghasera village 14 kilometres (8.7 mi) from Nuh city on Nun-Sohna road. The Jat ruler Surajmal of Bharatpur and Pathan Nawab Mir Muhammad Pannah killed the Rajput faujdar Bahadur Singh Bargujar of Koil [present day Aligarh on outskirts of Palwal] and his son Ajit Singh in 1753 in the Battle of Ghasera. During the battle, the Jats and Pathans laid siege to Ghasera, which lasted for 3 months and 1500 Jats and their allies were killed by the gun fire from ramparts of Ghasera Fort. On 23 April 1753, many women committed Jauhar, Bahadur Singh opened the gates of the fort for the final battle to death during which he and his companions were killed. Currently, of the four gateways only one remains along with the Ruined walls. in 1753.

=== Independence ===
Despite pressure by the princely states of Alwar and Bharatpur, who ruled in the region, the Meo community decided not to migrate to Pakistan during the Partition of India. In 1947, Mahatma Gandhi visited Ghasera to urge the Muslims living there not to leave, calling the Meos "Iss desh ke reed ke haddi" or the backbone of India.Every 19 December since 2000, Meo Muslims in Haryana have been commemorating Mahatma Gandhi’s visit to the village in erstwhile Mewat district as Mewat Diwas.

== See also ==
- Gurgaon
- Mewat
