= Dhoki =

Dhoki may refer to,

- Dhoki, Parner, village in Ahmednagar district of Maharashtra state of India
- Dhoki, Osmanabad, village in Osmanabad district of Maharashtra state of India

== See also ==
- Doki (disambiguation)
