= Doki (app) =

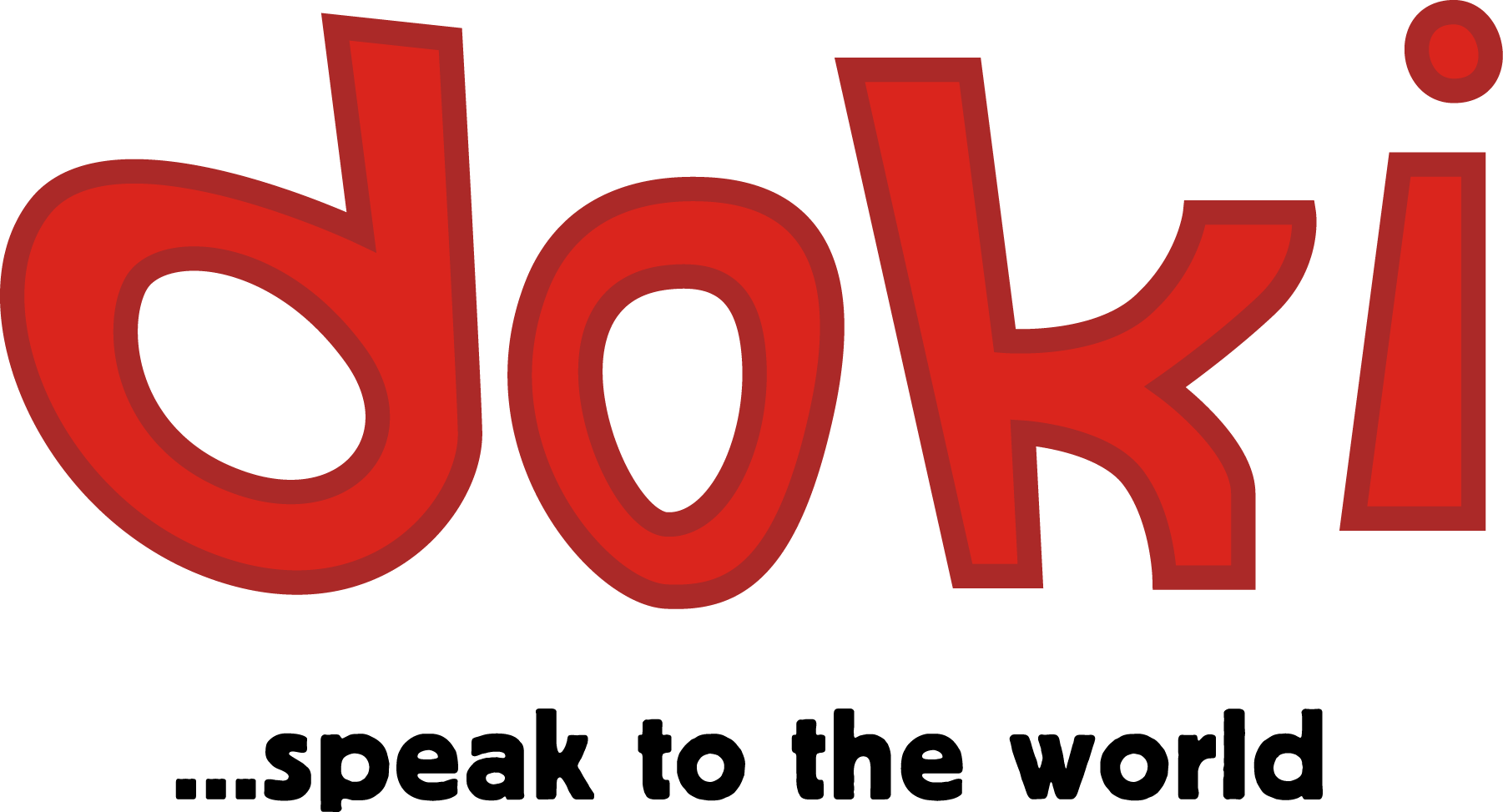
- Area served: worldwide
- Services: language learning software
- Owner: Eazyspeak Ltd.
- Website: Dokispeak.com

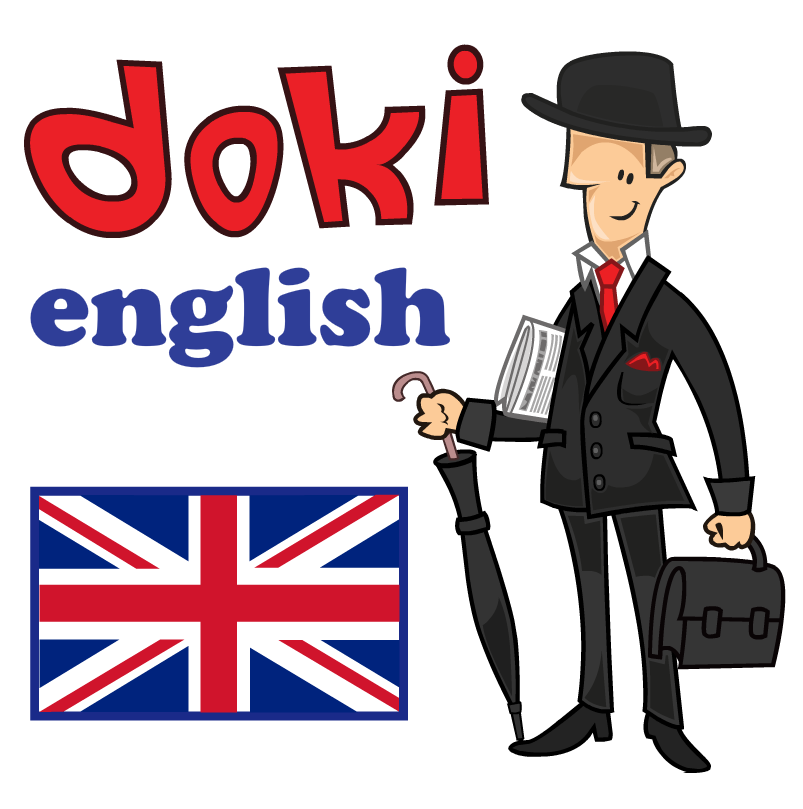
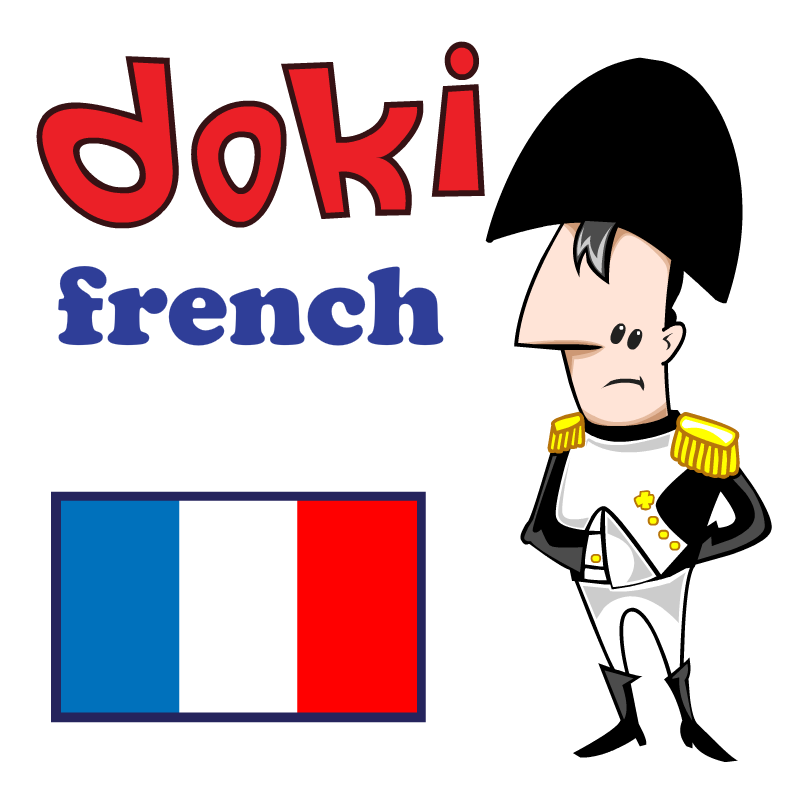
Logos for the English and French apps.
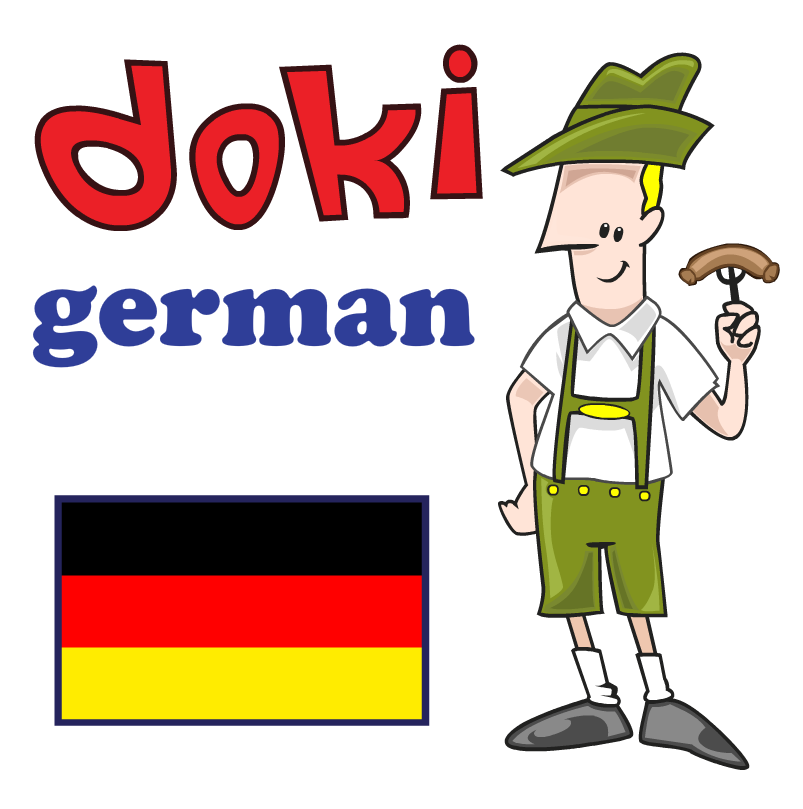
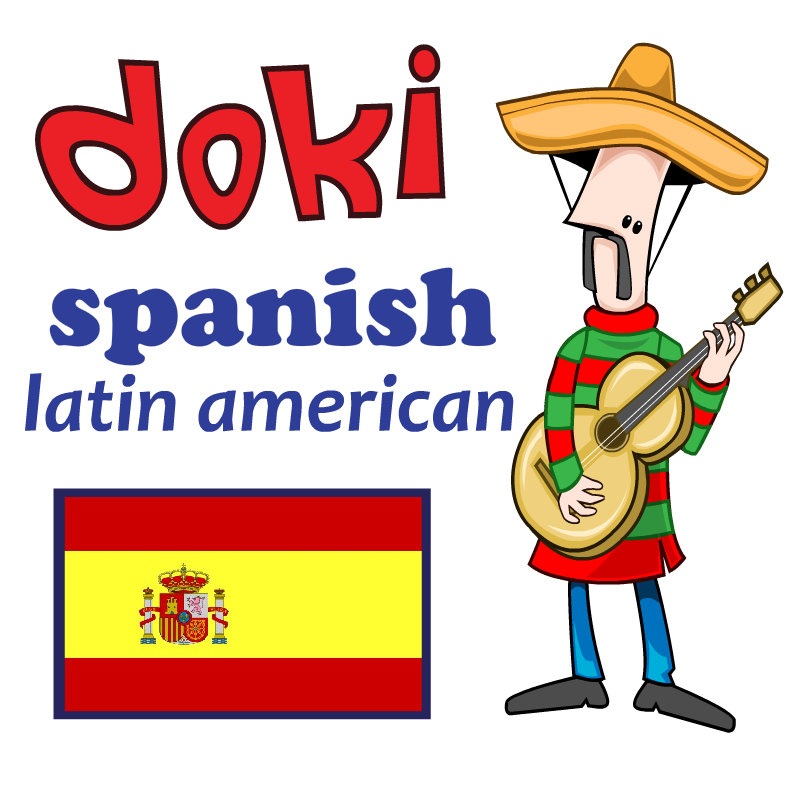
Logos for the German and Spanish (Latin American) apps.

Doki (/ˈdoʊki/ DOH-kee) is computer-assisted language learning software for learning the basics of foreign languages. Doki is available as a collection of 14 different mobile apps designed for iOS devices. It offers a basic level (Doki) and an advanced basic level (Doki Further) for learning English, French, German, Iberian Spanish, and Latin American Spanish.

Doki attempts to teach languages in an entertaining way with humour and without focusing on grammar. The apps feature a cartoon-style, city map (Doki City) in which the student navigates to learn vocabulary and common phrases associated with one of the city's 14 different places (lessons). For example, the student can tap on the restaurant icon to learn about different foods and how to order at a restaurant. Each place has interactive exercises to reinforce learning. All dialogues are spoken by native-speakers and the first two chapters are offered for free. Doki was awarded the “Parent’s Choice” Award at the Europrix Multimedia Awards.

== History ==
Doki was founded in 1999 in Cyprus and UK by Andy Hadjicostis and was first launched as CD-ROMs for Windows and OSX systems in 2001. After Andy died in 2010, his family decided to develop Doki into iOS apps. The apps were launched in December 2012.

== Awards and reception ==
- Parent's Choice Award (Europrix Multimedia Awards)
