= Mundia Khera =

- Village
- Location in India Mundia Khera (India)
- Coordinates: 28.207°N 76.681°E
- Country: India
- State: Haryana
- District: Rewari district
- Municipality: Rewari
- Postal code: 123401
- ISO 3166 code: IN-HR
- Website: haryana.gov.in

Mundia Khera is a village in the Rewari district of the Indian state of Haryana. It sits 7 kilometres (4.3 mi) from the city of Rewari. Mundia Khera Gram Panchayat is a relatively small village, comprising five wards and 800 voters as of 2003.

== History ==
The village was founded by the late Shri ganga Ram and his ancestors.

== Demographics ==
The village is dominated by the Ahirs.

== Culture ==
An ancient temple of Baba Murli Nath and another temple of God Hanuman ji are there. Every year Mela of Baba Murli Nath is organized four days before Holi festival. This village is a Nirmal village as declared by Haryana Government. It won Nirmal gram award by president of India for its cleanliness facilities.
