= Chowki No. 2 =

- village
- Location within Haryana Location within India
- Coordinates: 28.280995°N 76.494623°E
- Country: India

Government
  - Body: Village panchayat

Population (2011)
  - Total: 753
- Time zone: UTC+5:30 (IST)
- PIN: 12x xxx
- Website: www.rewari.gov.in

Chowki No. 2 is a village in Rewari mandal of Jatusana block, in the Indian state of Haryana.

== Demographics ==
As of 2011 India census, Chowki No. 2 had a population of 753 in 349 households. Males constituted 51.39% of the population and females 48.6%. The average literacy rate was 67.19%, less than the national average of 74%: male literacy was 60.47%, and female literacy was 39.52%. In Chowki No. 2, 15.8% of the population was under 6 years of age (119).

== Adjacent villages ==
- Motla Kala
- Motla Khurd
- Aulant
- Berli Kalan
- Haluhera
- Berli Khurd
- Kumrodha
