= Budhpur =

- Location within Haryana Location within India
- Coordinates: 28.245880°N 76.577359°E
- Country: India

Population (2020)
  - Total: 3,000
- Time zone: UTC+5:30 (IST)
- PIN: 123401
- Telephone code: 01274
- Website: www.rewari.gov.in

Budhpur is a village in Rewari mandal of Rewari district, in the Indian state of Haryana. It is near Chandawas village Rewari at about 8.8 kilometres (5.5 mi) on Drive via NH 71B, 9.3 kilometres (5.8 mi) Drive via Narnaul Rd and 12.2 kilometres (7.6 mi) Drive via SH 26 from Rewari.

== Demographics ==
As of 2011 India census, Budhpur had a population of 1909 in 391 households. Males (387) constitute 53.3% of the population and females (366) 46.6%. Budhpur has an average literacy rate of 84.3%, higher than the national of 74%: male literacy is 88.5%, and female literacy is 61.4%. In Budhpur, 11.8% of the population is under 6 years of age.

== Adjacent villages ==
- Kaluwas
- Chandawas
