= Rohrai =

Rohrai, Rewari
- Location within Haryana Location within India
- Coordinates: 28.320559°N 76.596500°E
- Country: India

Government
  - Body: Village panchayat
- Time zone: UTC+5:30 (IST)
- Website: www.rewari.gov.in

Rohrai is a town in the tehsil of Rewari, Rewari District, in the Gurgaon Division of the state of Haryana, India.
