= Fatehpuri Tappa Dahina =

Fatehpuri Tappa Dahina, Rewari
- Location within Haryana Location within India
- Coordinates: 28.317439°N 76.464985°E
- Country: India

Government
  - Body: Village panchayat

Population (2011)
  - Total: 1,749
- Time zone: UTC+5:30 (IST)
- PIN: 123411
- Website: www.rewari.gov.in

Fatehpuri Tappa Dahina is a village in Rewari district, Haryana, India, in Rohtak Division. It is located 25 kilometres (16 mi) west of Rewari on the Rewari-Kosli road. Its Pin code is 123411 and postal head office is Dahina.

== Demographics of 2011 ==
As of 2011 India census, Fatehpuri Tappa Dahina, Rewari had a population of 1749 in 350 households. Males (937) constitute 53.57% of the population and females (812) 46.42%. Fatehpuri Tappa Dahina has an average literacy (1261) rate of 72.09%, lower than the national average of 74%: male literacy (747) is 59.23%, and female literacy (514) is 42.9% of total literates (1261). In Fatehpuri Tappa Dahina, Rewari, 12.34% of the population is under 6 years of age (216).

== Adjacent villages ==
- Tumna
- Baldhan Kalan
- Dakhora
- Baldhan Khurd
- Khushpura
- Darauli
- Kanwali
- Motla Kalan
- Babroli
