= Prithvipura =

- village
- Location within Madhya Pradesh Location within India
- Coordinates: 23.3506455°N 77.3310067°E
- Country: India
- State: Madhya Pradesh
- District: Bhopal
- Tehsil: Huzur
- Elevation: 499 m (1,637 ft)

Population (2011)
  - Total: 103
- Time zone: UTC+5:30 (IST)
- ISO 3166 code: MP-IN
- 2011 census code: 482359

Prithvipura is a village in the Bhopal district of Madhya Pradesh, India. It is located in the Huzur tehsil and the Phanda block.

== Demographics ==
According to the 2011 census of India, Prithvipura has 21 households. The effective literacy rate (i.e. the literacy rate of population excluding children aged 6 and below) is 58.82%.

Demographics (2011 Census)
	Total	Male	Female
Population	103	52	51
Children aged below 6 years	18	7	11
Scheduled caste	103	52	51
Scheduled tribe	0	0	0
Literates	50	31	19
Workers (all)	57	31	26
Main workers (total)	32	27	5
Main workers: Cultivators	3	3	0
Main workers: Agricultural labourers	27	23	4
Main workers: Household industry workers	0	0	0
Main workers: Other	2	1	1
Marginal workers (total)	25	4	21
Marginal workers: Cultivators	1	0	1
Marginal workers: Agricultural labourers	24	4	20
Marginal workers: Household industry workers	0	0	0
Marginal workers: Others	0	0	0
Non-workers	46	21	25
