= Nikhri =

Village in Rewari (Haryana), India

- Village
- Location within Haryana Location within India
- Coordinates: 28.186178°N 76.729980°E
- Country: India
- State: Haryana
- District: Rewari district
- Municipality: Rewari
- Metro: Haryana
- REWARI Ahirwal: MBIR Manesar Bawal Investment Region

Government
  - Type: Gram Panchyat
  - Body: Gram Panchyat Nikhri
  - Sarpanch: Sunil Kumar
  - Lok Sabha: Gurugram Lok Sabha Constituency
  - Vidhan Sabha: Rewari (Vidhan Sabha constituency) Rewari Constituency

Population (2011)
  - Total: 1,255
- 1530

Languages
  - Official: Hindi हिंदी
  - Spoken: Haryanvi, Ahirwati
- Postal code: 122106
- ISO 3166 code: IN-HR
- Vehicle registration: HR 36
- Website: www.nikhri.ind.in

Nikhri is a Yadav village in Gurugram Mandal in Rewari District in Haryana State, India. Other towns in the area include Dharuhera. The main language of the village are Haryanvi and Ahirwati. It is about 13.6 kilometres (8.5 mi) on Jaipur Highway near Dharuhera Town 123106.The village is located on the bank of the Sahibi River, and it is a Yadav Dominant village . It is also named as Nikhari.

== Demographics ==
As of 2011 India census, Nikhri had a population of 1500 in 300 households. Males (770) constitute 51.95% of the population and females (730) 48.04%. Nikhri has an average literacy(911) rate of 72.58%, lower than the national average of 74%: male literacy(670) is 58.39%, and female literacy(630) is 41.6% of total literates (911). In Nikhri, 9.96% of the population is under 6 years of age (125).

== Nikhri Village Industrial Area ==
Nikhri Village Industrial Area has several factories are located around Nikhri.

== Education ==
GHS NIKHRI was established in 1956 and it is managed by the Department of Education. GHS Nikhri is oldest school in nearby villages and towns. It is located in Rural area. It is located in REWARI block of REWARI district of HARYANA.

There are many government and private schools, the former being managed by the Government of Haryana through the Haryana Board of School Education (HBSE).

== Connectivity ==
Nikhri lies on National Highway 48 and is served by many local buses and state Roadways buses and trains plying on this route. The nearest railway station is Rewari Junction; a major station is at Rewari.

== Rajiv Gandhi Herbal Park and Nature Camp, Sahabi Barrage ==
Rajiv Gandhi Herbal Park and Nature Camp, Sahabi Barrage was set up in 2011 by Government of Haryana at Sahabi Barrage to promote eco-tourism. It includes a herbal conservation park, ayurveda center, wetlands and children park set up by the Forests Department, Haryana. It also has log huts accommodation, tree houses, nature trails and dining facilities run by the Haryana Tourism.

== Economy ==
Some of the industrial units functioning in Nikhri are:

- Poultry Farming
- Mahindra & Mahindra
- JCB
- Datsun
- Transafe India Pvt Ltd
- Dhaba
- Rental Income

== Adjacent villages ==
- Dungarwas
- Hansaka
- Rasgan
- Kharkhada
- Masani
- Khaliyawas-Titarpur
- Jaunawas (jonawas)
- Niganiawas
- Raliawas
- Bhatsana
