= Chandawas =

- Village
- Location in Haryana Chandawas (India)
- Coordinates: 28.1235°N 76.3524°E
- Country: India
- State: Haryana
- District: Rewari district
- ISO 3166 code: IN-HR
- Website: haryana.gov.in

Chandawas is a village in Rewari mandal of the Rewari district, in the Indian state of Haryana. It is on Rewari- Berli/Kosli road Rewari at about 6 kilometres (3.7 mi) on the approach District Road. It is the first village when accessed through Rewari Kosli road.

== Adjacent villages ==
- Kharagwas
- Budhpur
- Saharanwas
