= Palhawas =

- Location within Haryana Location within India
- Coordinates: 28.356763°N 76.621776°E
- Country: India

Government
  - Body: Village panchayat

Area
  - Total: 10 km^{2} (3.9 sq mi)
- Elevation: 2,163 m (7,096 ft)

Population (2011)
  - Total: 4,563
- Time zone: UTC+5:30 (IST)
- PIN: 123035
- Vehicle registration: HR36
- Website: www.rewari.gov.in

Palhawas is a village in Rewari Tehsil, in the Rewari District of Haryana, India. It is on Rewari-Jhajjar road, approximately 21.5 kilometres (13.4 mi) distance from Rewari. Palhawas railway station is on Rewari-Rohtak railway line.

== Demographics ==
As of 2011 India census, Palhawas, Rewari had a population of 4463 in 890 households. Males (2301) constitute 51.55% of the population and females (2162) 48.45%. Palhawas has an average literacy (3800) rate of 85%, higher than the national average of 74%: male literacy (2000) is 86%, and female literacy (1800) is 83% of total literates (3800). In Palhawas, Rewari, 13.08% of the population is under 6 years of age (584).

== Adjacent villages ==
- Rohrai
- Kulana
- Gurawra
