= Bhatsana =

Bhatsana (Rewari)
- Location within Haryana Location within India
- Coordinates: 28.168242°N 76.753851°E
- Country: India
- State: Haryana
- District: Rewari district
- Municipality: Rewari

Population (2011)
  - Total: 2,777
- Postal code: 122106
- ISO 3166 code: IN-HR
- Website: www.rewari.gov.in

Bhatsana is a village situated in Rewari district, India. It is about 16 kilometres (9.9 mi) on Jaipur Highway from Rewari-Dharuhera-Bhiwadi road.

== Demographics ==
As of 2011 India census, Bhatsana had a population of 2777 in 535 households. Males (1448) constitute 52.14% of the population and females (1329) 47.85%. Bhatsana has an average literacy(1856) rate of 66.83%, lower than the national average of 74%: male literacy(1084) is 58.4%, and female literacy(772) is 41.59% of total literates (1856). In Bhatsana, 14.11% of the population is under 6 years of age (392).
