= Gurawra =

Gurawara Guraora
- Rural
- Gurawara
- Location within Haryana Location within India
- Coordinates: 28.382495°N 76.642715°E
- Country: India

Government
  - Body: Village panchayat

Population (2011)
  - Total: 6,108
- Time zone: UTC+5:30 (IST)
- PIN: 123035
- Telephone code: 01281
- Vehicle registration: HR 36
- Website: www.rewari.gov.in

Gurawara (or Guraora) is in Rewari tehsil of Rewari district, Haryana, India. It is 27.5 kilometres (17.1 mi) from Rewari on the Rewari-Jhajjar road. Gurawara Fort is a local landmark. Under CSC, it became the first digital village of India.

52.78% of the population is male and 47.21% of the population is female (2884). Gurawara has an average literacy (4136) rate of 67.71%, lower than the national average of 74%: male literacy (2475) is 59.84%, and female literacy (1661) is 40.15% of the total. In Gurawara, Rewari, 11.13% of the population is under 6 years of age (680).

== Adjacent villages ==
- Palhawas
- Kulana
- Jiwara
- Ratanthal
- Kanhori
- Patoda
