= Khijuri =

Khijuri (Rewari)
- Location within Haryana Location within India
- Coordinates: 28.168242°N 76.753851°E
- Country: India
- State: Haryana
- District: Rewari district
- Municipality: Rewari

Population (2011)
  - Total: 2,777
- Postal code: 122106
- ISO 3166 code: IN-HR
- Website: www.rewari.gov.in

Khijuri is a village situated in Rewari district, India. It is about 16 kilometres (9.9 mi) on Jaipur Highway from Rewari-Dharuhera-Bhiwadi road. It lies next to the 750 acre reserve forest and Peacock & Chinkara Breeding Centre, Jhabuwa.

== Demographics ==
As of 2011 India census, Khijuri had a population of 1679 in 312 households. Males (868) constitute 52.14% of the population and females (811) 47.85%. Khijuri has an average literacy rate of 66.83%, lower than the national average of 74%: male literacy is 58.4%, and female literacy is 41.59% of total literates (1230). In Khijuri, 14.11% of the population is under 6 years of age.
