= Masani =

Masani Dehaat
- Slum
- Location in India Masani Dehaat (India)
- Coordinates: 28.20481°N 76.729245°E
- Country: India
- State: Haryana
- District: Rewari
- Municipality: Rewari
- Time zone: 5:30 GMT
- Postal code: 123106
- ISO 3166 code: IN-HR

Masani is a village in Rewari District, Haryana.

Rajiv Gandhi Herbal Park and Nature Camp was set up in 2011 by Government of Haryana at Masani Barrage to promote eco-tourism. It includes a herbal conservation park, ayurveda center, wetlands and children park set up by the Forests Department, Haryana

== Adjacent Villages ==
- Nikhri Saurce on NH48
- Dungarwas
- Jaunawas
- Hansaka
- Khaliawas
