= Saharanwas =

- Village
- Location in India Saharanwas (India)
- Coordinates: 28.1218°N 76.3346°E
- Country: India
- State: Haryana
- District: Rewari district
- Municipality: Rewari
- Postal code: 123401

Saharanwas is a village in Rewari district, Haryana, India. It is situated 5 kilometres (3.1 mi) from the city of Rewari, on the Narnaul-Mahendragarh road.

A report published in 2003 described the village as "large", with around 600 households and 2000 voters present. In the same year, the majority of the population were listed as being Scheduled Caste in the Indian system intended to aid positive discrimination in the spheres of employment and education.

The position of Sarpanch, who acts as head of the village and is assisted by a Gram Panchayat (local administrative body) consisting of nine people, is controlled by one particular family of the Ahir community. It is also the Ahir community who control most of the land, "including a large portion of Panchayat land and common village land." The Sarpanch expressed frustration when he was interviewed in 2003 regarding the effectiveness of the Gram Panchayat, the work of which he said was hampered by administrative issues mostly outside its control.

It was announced in 2010 that an Industrial Training Institute would be established in the village on land donated by the panchayat for that purpose. The Mata Raj Kaur Institute of Engineering & Technology was founded in 2009.

The village hosts a legal aid clinic and as of 2003 had an ayurvedic dispensary, although the latter was not much used because most of the populace did not believe in that form of medicine.

Saharanwas is the birthplace of Ajay Singh Yadav, who was elected to the Haryana Vidhan Sabha (state legislative assembly) on five occasions between 1989 and 2005.

== Education ==
- Smt. Shanti Devi College of Management & Technology
- Smt. Shanti Devi School of Nursing
- Mata Raj Kaur Institute of Engineering & Technology
