= Dahina =

- Dahina (डहीना)
- Location within Haryana Location within India
- Coordinates: 28.297808°N 76.383986°E
- Country: India

Government
  - Body: Village panchayat

Population (2011)
  - Total: 7,246 (male 3,741 female 3,505)
- Time zone: UTC+5:30 (IST)
- PIN: 123411
- Vehicle registration: HR 36
- Website: www.rewari.gov.in

Dahina is a village in Rewari district, Haryana State, India, in Gurgaon Division. It is a Sub-Tehsil and a Block of Rewari District . It is 27.4 kilometres (17.0 mi) west from the district headquarters Rewari on State High way No 24 (Rewari-Dahina-Kanina-Mohindergarh Road). Dahina is dominated by Yadav's of Khola Gotra and it is a popular pilgrimage place. The temple of Baba Jinda Dev, Mata Cheela and Baba Shayarwala are main pilgrimage sites in Dahina. In Dahina Court of Naib Tehsildar established in A mini secretariat {Temporary Location In Panchyat Bhawan Dahina} for registry etc. works. An 80-bed Govt Civil Hospital and one veterinary hospital is already established in Dahina. Dahina has a 132 KV Power station of electricity. In Dahina there are three financial institutions i.e. Central Bank of India, sarv haryana gramin bank and HDFC bank . Central Bank of India was oldest among them. in Educational Institutions a Govt Girls Sen Sec School, A Govt boys High School, A Govt Primary School, and Three Private Schools like Vivekananda Sen Sec School, Shiva school, Mahrashi Dayanand School are also In Dahina. There is a PACS (Society/Bank) also in Dahina .

== Demographics of 2011 ==
As of 2011 India census, Dahina, Rewari had a population of 7246 in 1521 households. Males (3741) constitute 51.62% of the population (Janshankya) and females (3505) 48.37%. Dahina has an average literacy (5233) rate of 72.21%, lower than the national average of 74%: male literacy (3003) is 57.38%, and female literacy (2230) is 42.61% of total literates (5233). In Dahina, Rewari, 11.74% of the population is under 6 years of age (851). Dahina has many temples like Baba Zinda Dev mandir, Baba Shayrwala Mandir, Baba Mansadas Mandir, Baba Hanuman wala Mandir etc. Baba Zinda dev Mandir is famous for Baba Zinda, a Bhakta of BabaJaharveer Goga Ji Maharaj. In this temple you will get more spirituality and peace. There is now a playground on the land of Baba Zinda Dev Mandir and one Stadium name as "KHEL STADIUM DAHINA " where Kabaddi and Athletic events are organised on special occasions.

== Dahina block ==
Here are the full list of villages of Dahina block.

#	Village Name
1	Aulant (77)
2	Bithori (75)
3	Bohka (23)
4	Buroli(76)
5	Dahina (12)
6	Daroli (3)
7	Dhani Thather Bad (14)
8	Dhawana (156)
9	Didoli (8)
10	Fatehpuri Tappa Dahina (5).
11	Gothra Tappa Dahina (11)
12	Zainabad (13)
13	Kahari (6)
14	Kanwali (10)
15	Kumbrodha (94)
16	Lisan (1)
17	Lohana (16)
18	Mandola (21)
19	Maseet (9)
20	Motla Kalan (96)
21	Motla Khurd (95)
22	Mundi(80)
23	Nangal Mundi (78)
24	Nimoth (19)
25	Rampuri (7)
26	Siha (15)
27	Srinagar (20)
28	Aaliawas (83)
29	Bangrawa (86)
30	Bhathera (79)
31	Bohatwas Ahir (85)
32	Roliawas (84)
33	Uncha (24)
34	Dakhora(2)
35	Kheri (4-n)
36	Nangal (3/ 1-n)
37	Bass
38	Dehlawas (89)
39	Gulabpura (88)
