= Dungarwas =

- village
- Location within Haryana Location within India
- Coordinates: 28.197737°N 76.71813°E
- Country: India
- State: Haryana
- District: Rewari district
- Municipality: Rewari

Population (2011)
  - Total: 1,666
- Postal code: 123106
- ISO 3166 code: IN-HR
- Website: www.rewari.gov.in

Dungarwas (or Dungerwas) is a village situated in Rewari district, India. It is about 11.8 kilometres (7.3 mi) on right side approach road on Rewari-Delhi road and on left Masani is the third village.

Temple of Baba Rupadas Ji is the famous religious place in Dungarwas village.

== Demographics ==
As of 2011 India census, Dungarwas had a population of 1666 in 299 households. Male constitutes 51.86% of the population and females 48.13%. Dungarwas has an average literacy rate of 75.99%, more than the national average of 74%; male literacy is 57.66%, and female literacy is 42.33% of total literates. In Dungarwas, 11.7% of the population is under 6 years of age.

== Adjacent villages ==
- Nikhri
- Masani
- Rasgan
- Jonawas
- Khijuri
