= Hansaka =

- Village
- Location in India Hansaka (India)
- Coordinates: 28.207°N 76.681°E
- Country: India
- State: Haryana
- District: Rewari district
- Municipality: Rewari
- Postal code: 123401
- ISO 3166 code: IN-HR
- Website: haryana.gov.in

Hansaka is the first village located on Rewari-Delhi road in the Rewari district of Haryana, India, approximately 7 kilometres (4.3 mi) from the city of Rewari. Hansaka Gram Panchayat is a relatively large village, comprising nine wards and 1,600 voters as of 2003. The village population is dominated by the Ahirs.Three big temples in village one is of goddess shera wali mata mandir and one is Shiv temple opposite to the lane of Shri Baldev Singh Yadav and last is at Village bus stop stand. And four small Temples. And its bus stop connects ten villages.
