= Gurgaon division =

Gurgaon Division
- Division
- Gurugram Division
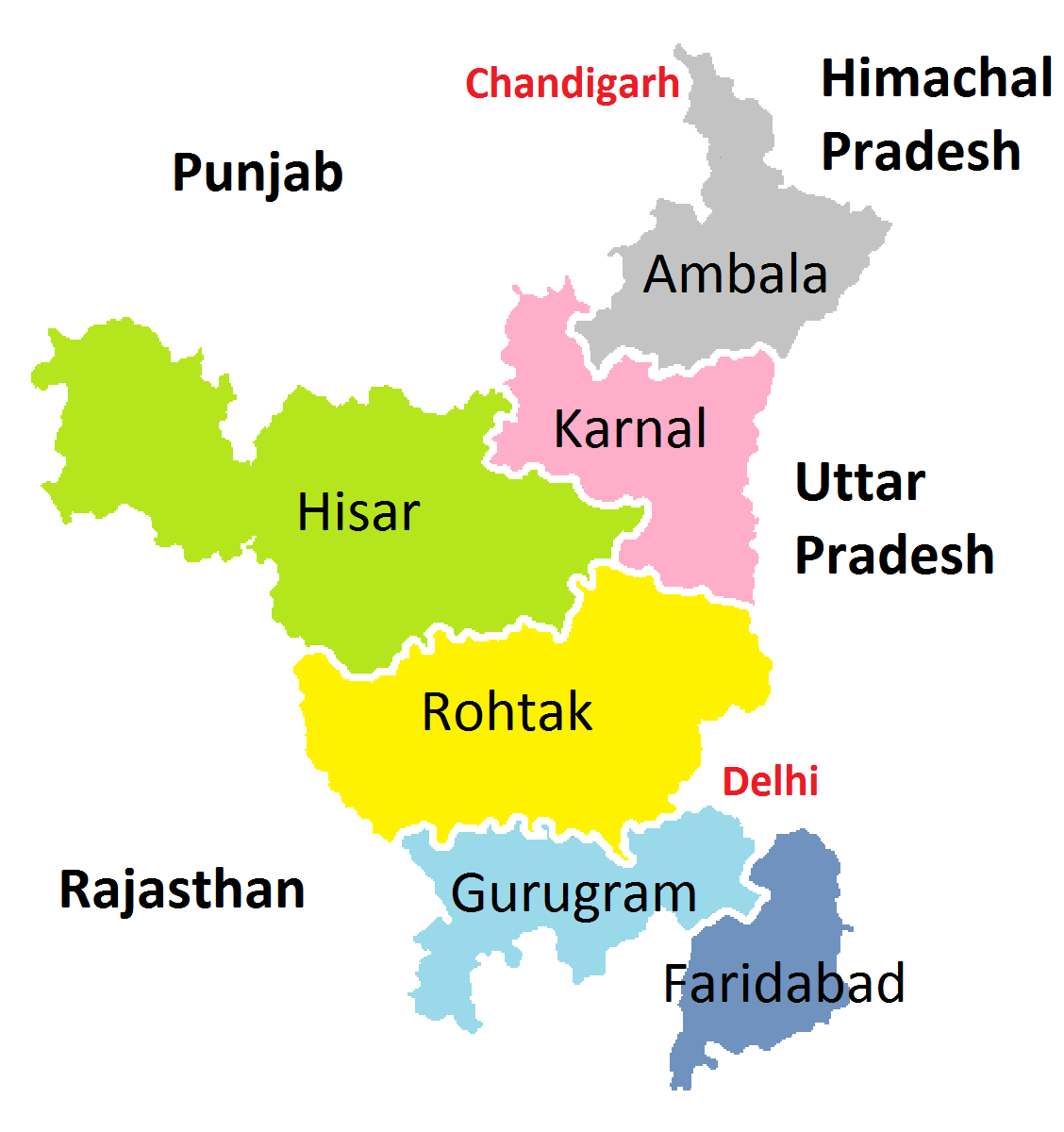
- Gurugram Division in Haryana State
- Country: India
- State: Haryana

Gurgaon division, officially known as Gurugram division, is one of the six divisions of Haryana, India. The division comprises the districts of Gurgaon, Mahendragarh and Rewari. This division used to be called Gurgaon division, but on 27 September 2016, it was renamed to Gurugram division.

== See also ==
- Districts of Haryana
- Gurgaon district
