= Rewari district =

- District of Haryana
- Location in Haryana
- Coordinates (Rewari): 27.95°N 76.28°E - 28.47°N 76.85°E
- Country: India
- State: Haryana
- Division: Gurugram
- Established: 1 November 1989
- Headquarters: Rewari
- Tehsils: 1. Rewari, 2. Bawal, 3. Kosli, 4. Palhawas, 5. Nahar

Government
  - District collector: Ashok Kumar Garg, IAS

Area
  - Total: 1,594 km^{2} (615 sq mi)

Population (2011)
  - Total: 900,332
  - Density: 564.8/km^{2} (1,463/sq mi)
  - Urban: 25.93%

Demographics
  - Literacy: 80.99%
  - Sex ratio: 898
- Time zone: UTC+05:30 (IST)
- Vehicle registration: HR-36
- Major highways: NH 48 NH 352 NH 11 NH 919
- Average annual precipitation: 569.6 mm
- Lok Sabha constituencies: 1. Rohtak (shared with Rohtak and Jhajjar districts), 2. Gurgaon (shared with Gurgaon and Nuh districts)
- Vidhan Sabha constituencies: 1. Rewari, 2. Bawal, 3. Kosli
- Website: rewari.gov.in

Rewari district is one of the 23 districts in the southern part of state of Haryana, India. Rewari in known for ancient Ahir cultural region called Ahirwal. It was carved out of Gurgaon district by the Government of Haryana on 1 November 1989. It is also part of the National Capital Region. The administrative headquarter of the district is the city of Rewari, which is also the biggest city in the district. In medieval times, it was an important market town. It is located in southern Haryana. As of 2011, it is the second least populous district of Haryana after Panchkula.

== History ==
The history of Rewari district is contemporary to the history of Delhi. During the Mahabharata period there was a king named Rewat who had a daughter named Rewati. But the king used to call her Rewa lovingly. The king founded and established a city named "Rewa wadi" after the name of her daughter. Later on Rewa got married with Balram, elder brother of Lord Krishna and the king gifted the city of "Rewa wadi”as dowry to her daughter. Later the city Rewa wadi became Rewari.

=== Rezang La battle of 1962 ===
Rezang La was the site of the last stand of the 13 Kumaon, an all-Ahir company, during the Sino-Indian War in 1962. The company was led by Major Shaitan Singh, who won a posthumous Param Vir Chakra for his actions. From the Indian point of view, Rezang La had the drawback that an intervening feature blocked artillery operation, so that the Indian infantry had to do without artillery cover.

In this action on 18 November 1962, 114 Indian soldiers out of a total of 123 were killed. Almost all of them were from Rewari. A memorial in Rewari, where most of the Ahir soldiers came from, claims that 1,300 Chinese soldiers were killed in the battle. A memorial was constructed near Dharuhera Chowk in Rewari city by Rezangla Shaurya Samiti. Every year memorial functions are held by the Samiti in collaboration with district administration and the Kumaon Regiment. Family members of those who died at Rezangla also take part in it.

== Demographics ==
Historical population
Year	Pop.	±% p.a.
1951	259,847	—
1961	314,793	+1.94%
1971	390,351	+2.17%
1981	486,084	+2.22%
1991	610,611	+2.31%
2001	765,351	+2.28%
2011	900,332	+1.64%

According to the 2011 census, Rewari district has a population of 900,332, roughly equal to the nation of Fiji or the US state of Delaware. This gives it a ranking of 466th in India (out of a total of 640). The district has a population density of 565 inhabitants per square kilometre (1,460/sq mi). Its population growth rate over the decade 2001-2011 was 17.09%. Rewari has a sex ratio of 898 females for every 1000 males. The total literacy rate is 80.99%, which for males is 91.44% and for females is 69.57%. Scheduled Castes make up 20.28% of the population.

Religion in Rewari district (2011)
Religion	Percent
Hinduism	98.76%
Islam	0.63%
Other or not stated	0.61%

=== Language ===
Languages of Rewari district (2011)
1. Hindi (72.5%)
2. Haryanvi (25.6%)
3. Others (1.96%)

At the time of the 2011 Census of India, 72.46% of the population spoke Hindi and 25.58% Haryanvi as their first language.

Ahirwati, also called Hirwati (the language of Ahirs), is spoken in Ahirwal.

Rewari, Mahendergarh, Narnaul, Gurgaon, Kotkasim, Kotputli, Neemrana, Southern Jhajjar, Bansur, Behror and Mundawar are considered as the centre of Ahirwati speaking area. It represents the connecting link between Mewati and three other dialects Bangaru, Bagri and Shekhawati.

== Economy ==
Proximity with the Delhi and the presence of minerals in the district has allowed Rewari to possess a mixed type of economy. Since its formation in 1989, the number of workers employed in agriculture has come down from 54.7% to 33.8% in 2011. The workforce has been absorbed in the growing tertiary and secondary sectors.

=== Industry ===
The city of Rewari was historically known for its brassworks and turbans.

But before its formation in 1989, the district had only two medium scale industrial units. The formation of the district coincided with economic liberalisation in India and movement of industries from Delhi to the National Capital Region in its periphery. Industrial growth was also aided by the creation of industrial estates like Dharuhera in Rewari and Industrial Model Township in Bawal. Consequently, the number of medium and large scale units in the district has increased to 168 as o. etc. The various medium scale units manufacture products like brass/copper sheets, coils/cables, synthetic yarn, plastic products, printing paper, medicines, beer, ready made garments, machinery, electrical products etc.

=== Agriculture ===
Out of the total 159,400 hectares of available land, 120,897 hectares or 83.79% land is used for agriculture. Rewari is deficient in rainfall and has to depend on manual irrigation. Slope of the district, from south to north, is a great hindrance in bringing water from north using gravity flow. To overcome this, work on Jawaharl Lal Nehru (JLN) canal was started in 1974-75 to bring water by successive lifts using high capacity pumps. The JLN feeder is 104 kilometres long channel taking off from tail of Delhi parallel branch at Khubru. Even so, most of the irrigation is still done through tube wells.

The crops grown in the district are broadly divided into two categories - Kharif or Sawani crops grown in the summer between June and October and Rabi or Sadhi crops grown in winter between November and harvested in April/May. Any crop which does not fall within these two harvests is called Zaid crop and its harvest is called Zaid Kharif or Zaid Rabi depending on the harvest with which it is assessed.

Major Kharif crop grown in the district is bajra (pearl millet) in over 60,000 hectares of land. Rewari is among the top five producers of bajra in Haryana. Minor crops include paddy, jowar (sorghum), cotton and Kharif vegetables like onion, turnip, cucumber etc. Jowar is cultivated mainly as fodder for livestock. Animals are fed on bajra throughout the year due to lack of green fodder. Major Rabi crops are wheat and oilseeds while minor ones are barley, gram and Rabi vegetables. Wheat is an important wheat crop and is grown in about 50,000 hectares of land. Rapeseed and mustard seed are important cash crops grown alongside wheat in the Rabi season. Rewari is ranked third in Haryana in the production of rapeseed and mustard seed. Toria (an oilseed) is cultivated as Zaid Kharif and vegetables, melon and green fodder as Zaid Rabi.

Farmers make intensive use of agriculture machinery and modern fertilizers to increase productivity. During 2010–2011, 6,427 tractors, 2,309 combine harvesters and tubewells 24,181 were in use in the district. During the same period over 50,000 tonnes of chemical fertilizers were used.

Rewari receives average annual rainfall of 569.6 mm.

Lack of green fodder means that Rewari has comparatively less numbers of animals reared than other districts of Haryana. As of 2012, livestock in the district numbered 290,272 which is 3.3% of total livestock in Haryana. Poultry stock numbered 739,732.

Rewari has own Commodity(Mandi) for nearby farmers. Rewari Mandi is the biggest mandi in nearby 70 km area in Haryana. The main area of supply from this mandi is mustard, wheat & vegetables from the local farmers.

== Politics ==
The district consists of three assembly constituencies - Rewari, Bawal and Kosli. Rewari and Bawal come in the Gurgaon Lok Sabha constituency while Kosli comes in Rohtak. In the 2014 Lok Sabha elections, the Bhartiya Janata Party managed to win all three assembly segments in the district. In Legislative Assembly elections, held later in the same year, the BJP again won all three seats.

== Administrative divisions ==
=== Sub-divisions ===
- Rewari
- Kosli
- Bawal

=== Tehsils ===
- Rewari
- Kosli
- Bawal
- Palhawas

==== Sub Tehsils ====
- Dharuhera
- Dahina
- Manethi

=== Blocks ===
- Dharuhera
- Khol
- Nahar
- Jatusana
- Bawal
- Rewari
- Dahina
