= Punjabis =

Indo-Aryan ethnolinguistic group

ਪੰਜਾਬੀ; پنجابی
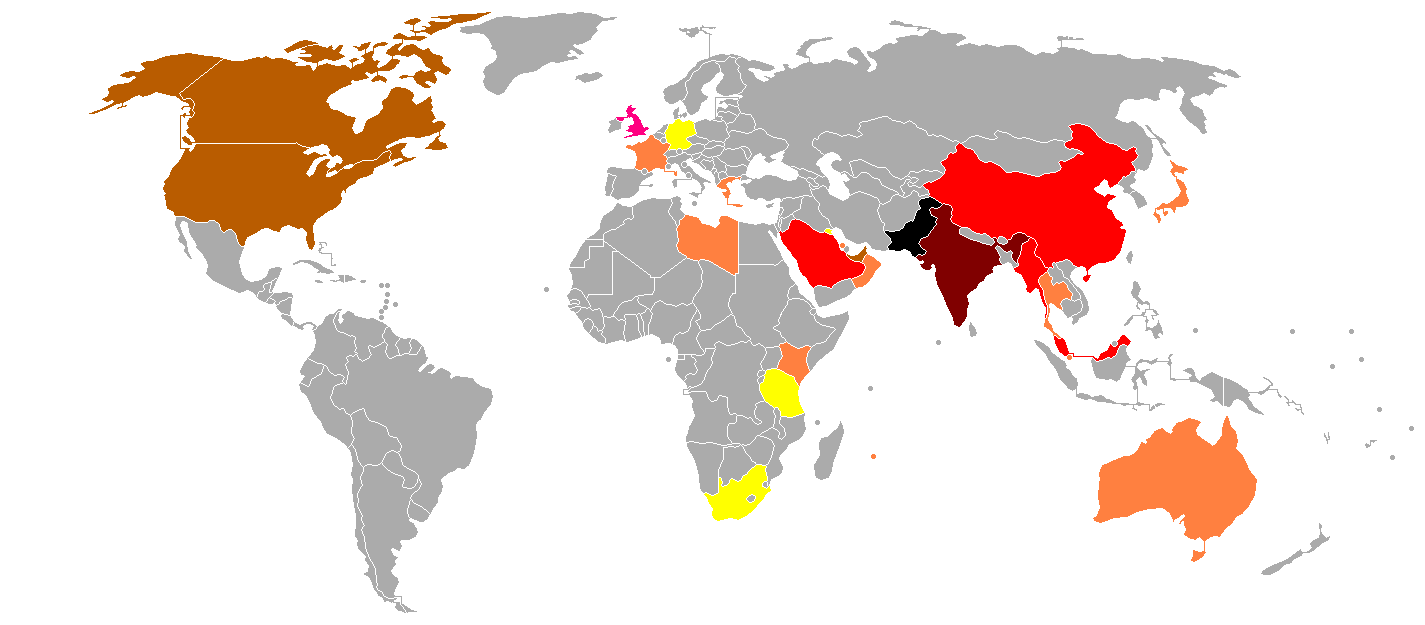

Total population
- c. 150 million

Regions with significant populations
- Pakistan: 112,806,516 (2024) (Note: Punjabis comprise 44.7% (112,806,516) of Pakistan's total population of 252,363,571 per 2024 estimate by the World Factbook.)
- India: 38,046,464 (2024) (Note: Punjabis comprise 2.7% (38,046,464) of India's total population of 1,409,128,296 per 2024 estimate by the World Factbook.) (Note: This figure comprises speakers of the Punjabi language in India. Ethnic Punjabis who no longer speak the language are not included in this number.)
- Canada: 942,170 (2021) (Note: Statistic includes all speakers of the Punjabi language, as many multi-generation individuals do not speak the language as a mother tongue, but instead as a second or third language.)
- United Kingdom: 700,000 (2006)
- United States: 253,740
- Australia: 132,496 (2017)
- Malaysia: 56,400 (2019)
- Philippines: 50,000 (2016)
- Indonesia: 35,000 (2019)
- New Zealand: 34,227 (2018)
- Norway: 24,000 (2013)
- Bangladesh: 23,700 (2019)
- Germany: 18,000 (2020)
- Nepal: 10,000 (2011)
- Others: See Punjabi diaspora

Languages
- L1: Punjabi and its dialects L2: Urdu (in Pakistan) and Hindi and other Indian languages (in India)

Religion
- Islam (55-60%): Sikhism (23-30%) Hinduism (10-15%) Christianity(1%) Ravidassia

Related ethnic groups
- Other Indo-Aryan peoples

The Punjabis (Punjabi: ਪੰਜਾਬੀ ^{(Gurmukhi)} / پنجابی ^{(Shahmukhi)}, romanized: Pañjābī) also spelt Panjabis, are an Indo-Aryan ethnolinguistic group associated with the Punjab region, comprising areas of northwestern India and eastern Pakistan, who generally speak any of the several Punjabi dialects.

The coalescence of the various tribes, castes and the inhabitants of the Punjab region into a broader common "Punjabi" identity initiated from the onset of the 18th century CE. Historically, the Punjabi people were a heterogeneous group and were subdivided into a number of clans called biradari (literally "brotherhood") or tribes, with each person bound to a clan. With the passage of time, tribal structures became replaced with a more cohesive and holistic society, as community building and group cohesiveness form the new pillars of Punjabi society. Integration and assimilation are important parts of Punjabi culture, since Punjabi identity is not based solely on tribal connections.

Punjabi people follow one of several religions, mainly Islam, Sikhism, Hinduism or Christianity. A majority of them adheres to Islam, with the rest mainly practising Sikhism and Hinduism and a smaller minority following Christianity. Regionally, Punjabi Muslims mainly live in Punjab, Pakistan with Punjabi Hindus and Sikhs primarily inhabiting Punjab, India; Punjabi Christians live on the both sides.

== Etymology and background ==
The ethnonym Punjabi comes from the toponym Punjab, literally the 'five rivers': Beas, Chenab, Jhelum, Ravi, and Sutlej, which are the tributaries of Indus. (Note: Alternatively, the 'five rivers' may include Indus but exclude Beas.) The toponym gained currency for the region at the turn of the 2nd millennium CE; it was earlier known by a variety of other names. The name is of Persian origin, with its two parts (پنج, panj, 'five' and آب, āb, 'water') being calque of the Sanskrit पञ्‍च, pañca, 'five' and अप्, áp, 'water', of the same meaning.

An early use of the present name for the region can be found in the writings of the 14th-century governor of Multan, Ayn al-Mulk Mahru (d. 1362), who denoted it as the wilayat of Panjāb (ولایت وسیعۀ پنجاب, 'vast realm of Punjab'), as well as in the travelogue of Ibn Battuta. Much earlier, the region was known as Sapta Sindhu in the Rigveda and Hapta Hendu in the Avesta, both meaning "The Land of Seven Rivers"; the additional two being Indus and Kabul. In the Karṇaparvan section of Mahabharata the region is also named as Pañcanada and Āraṭṭa.

== Geographic distribution ==
Traditionally, the Punjabi identity is primarily linguistic, geographical and cultural. Its identity is independent of historical origin or religion and refers to those who reside in the Punjab region or associate with its population and those who consider the Punjabi language their mother tongue. Punjab is a geopolitical, cultural, and historical region in South Asia, specifically in the northern part of the Indian subcontinent, comprising areas of eastern Pakistan and northwestern India. The boundaries of the region are fluid and focus on historical accounts, with its geographical definition changing over time. In the 16th century Mughal Empire, it referred to a relatively smaller area between the Indus and the Sutlej rivers.

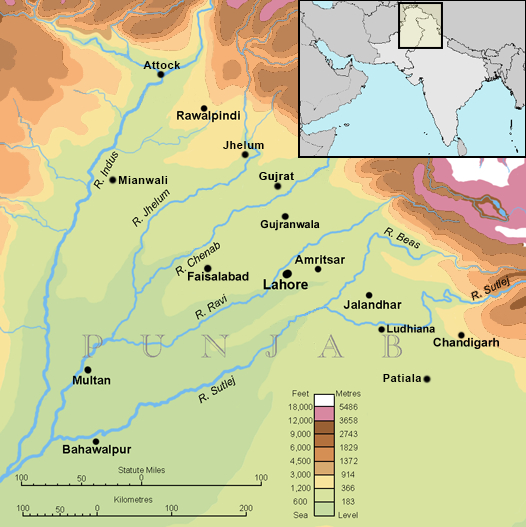
The Punjab region, with its rivers.

=== Pakistan ===
While the total population of Punjab is 110 million as noted in the 2017 Pakistan census, Punjabi people comprise approximately 44.7% of the national population. With an estimated national population of 252 million in 2024, ethnic Punjabis thus number approximately 112.8 million in Pakistan; this makes Punjabis the largest ethnic group in Pakistan by population.

Religious homogeneity remains elusive as a predominant Sunni population with Shia, Ahmadiyya and Christian minorities.

=== India ===
The Punjabi-speaking people make up 2.74% of India's population as of 2011. The total number of Indian Punjabis is unknown due to the fact that ethnicity is not recorded in the Census of India. Sikhs are largely concentrated in the modern-day state of Punjab forming 57.7% of the population with Hindus forming 38.5%. Ethnic Punjabis are believed to account for at least 40% of Delhi's total population and are predominantly Hindi-speaking Punjabi Hindus. The Indian censuses record the native languages, but not the descent of the citizens. Thus, there is no concrete official data on the ethnic makeup of Delhi and other Indian states.

Indian Punjab is also home to small groups of Muslims and Christians. Most of the East Punjab's Muslims left for West Punjab in 1947. However, a small community still exists today, mainly in Qadian, and Malerkotla.

=== Punjabi diaspora ===
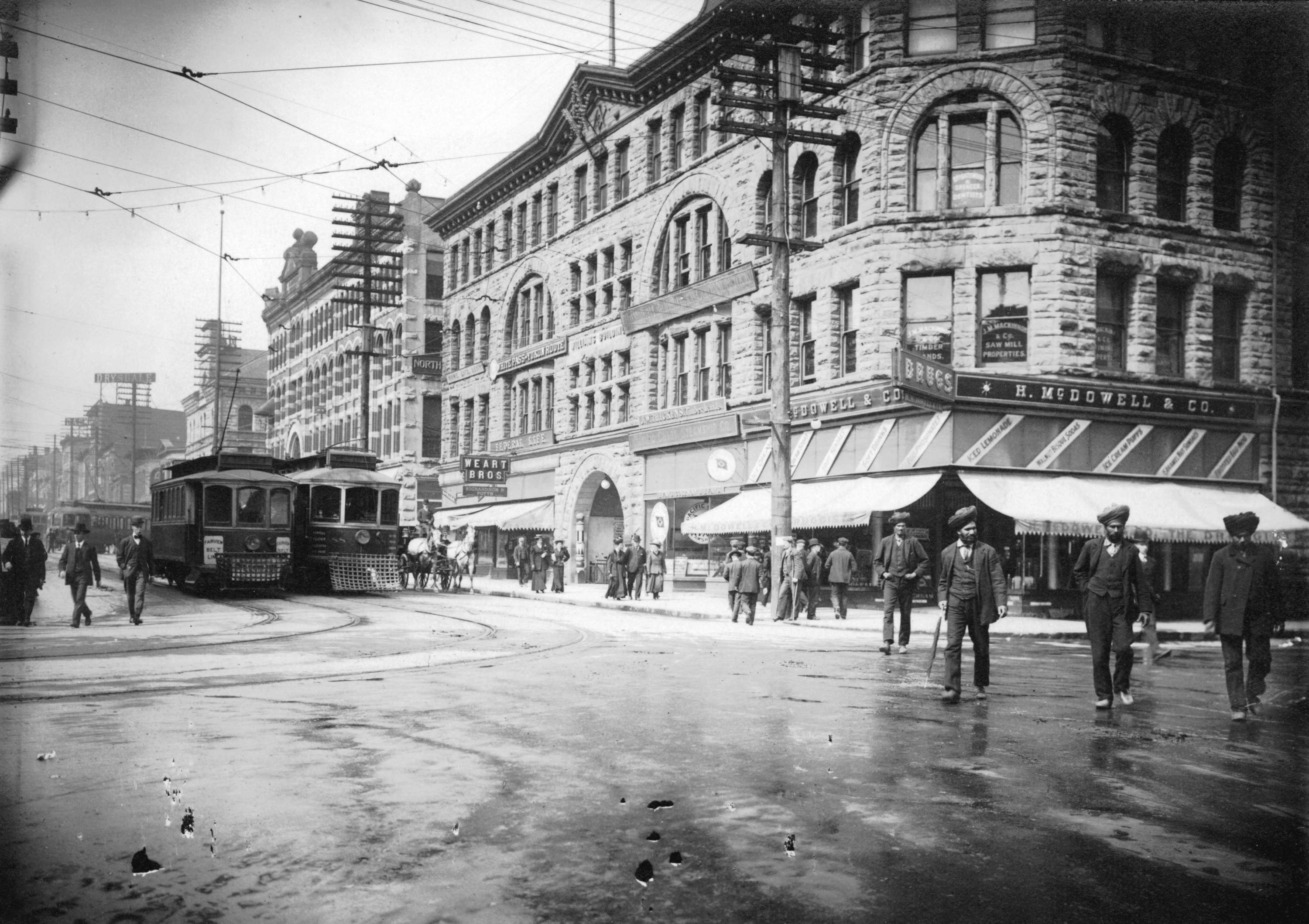
Punjabis in Vancouver, 1908

The Punjabi people have emigrated in large numbers to many parts of the world. In the early 20th century, many Punjabis began settling in the United States, including independence activists who formed the Ghadar Party. The United Kingdom has a significant number of Punjabis from both Pakistan and India. The most populous areas being London, Birmingham, Manchester and Glasgow. In Canada (specifically Vancouver, Toronto, and Calgary) and the United States, (specifically California's Central Valley as well as the New York and New Jersey region). In the 1970s, a large wave of emigration of Punjabis (predominately from Pakistan) began to the Middle East, in places such as the UAE, Saudi Arabia and Kuwait. There are also large communities in East Africa including the countries of Kenya, Uganda and Tanzania. Punjabis have also emigrated to Australia, New Zealand and Southeast Asia including Malaysia, Philippines, Thailand, Indonesia, Singapore and Hong Kong. Of recent times many Punjabis have also moved to Italy.

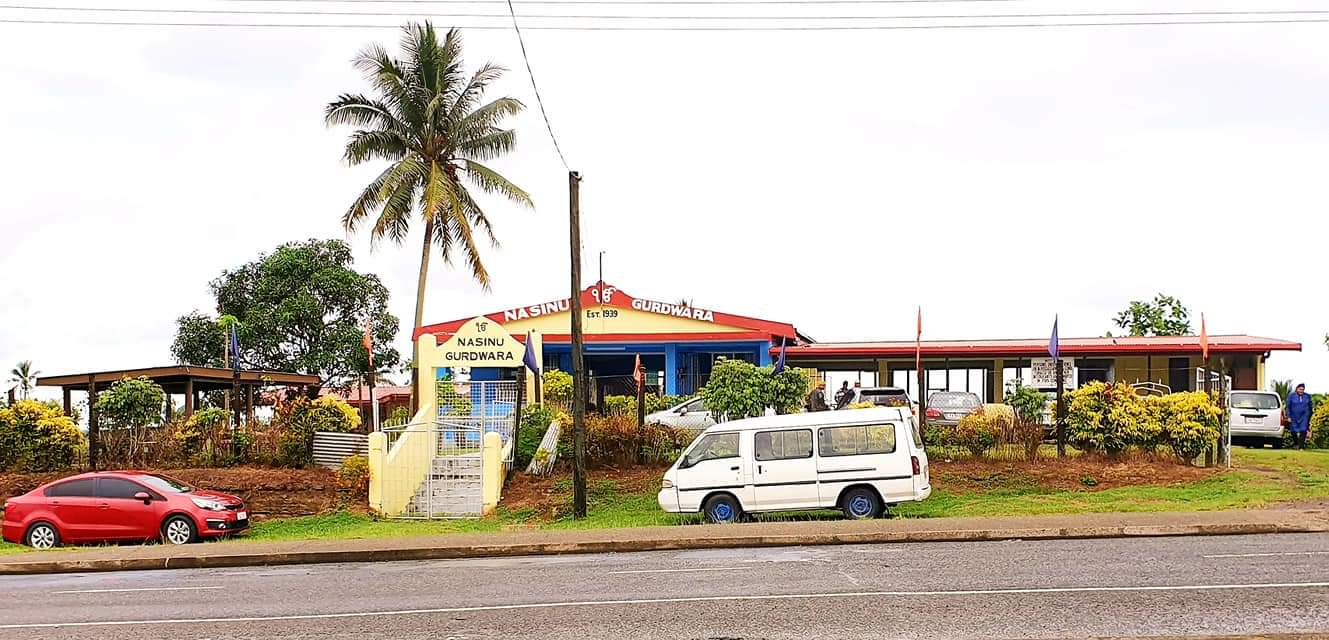
Gurdwara Guru Ravidass, Nasinu, Fiji Established in 1939

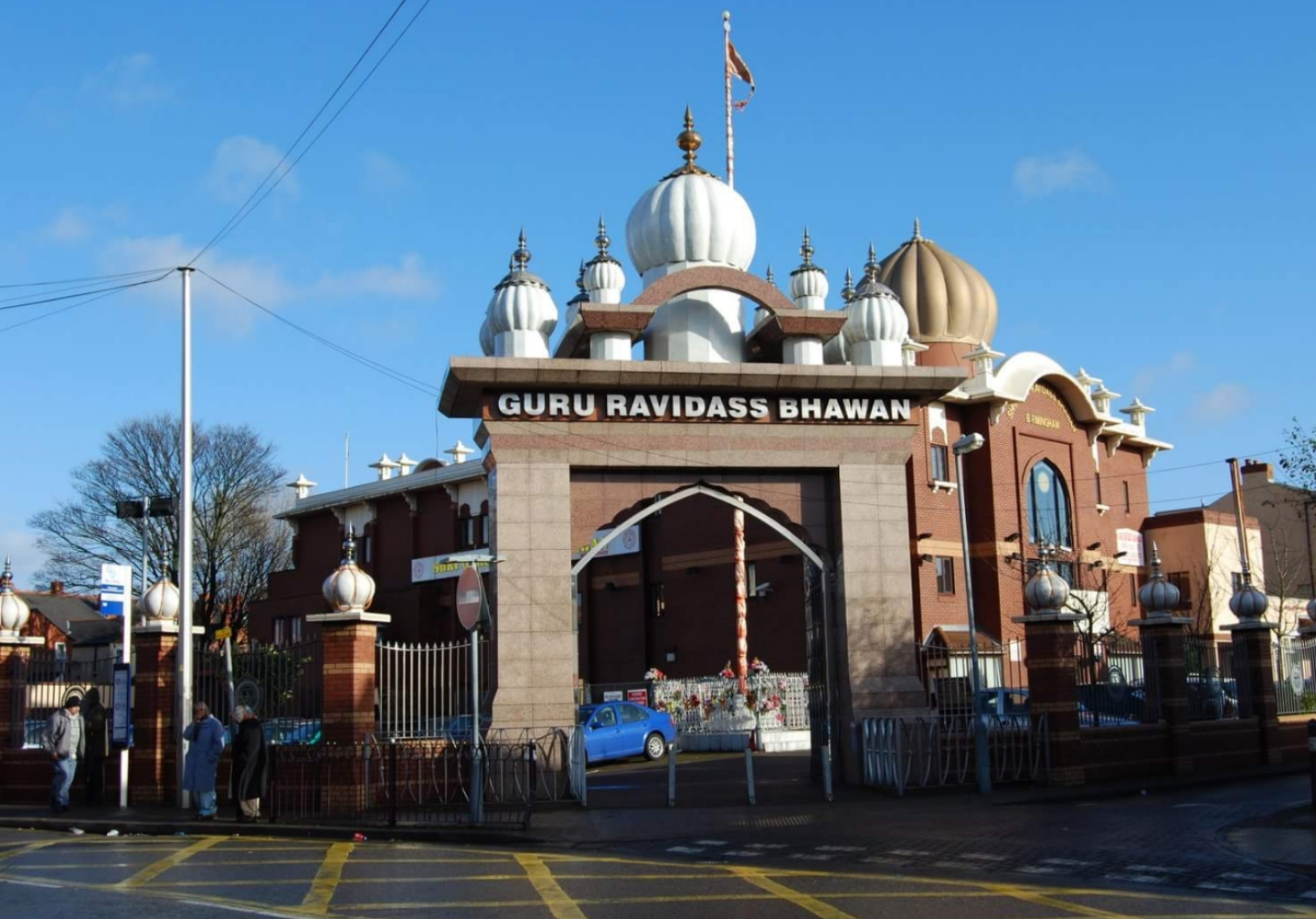
Gurdwara Guru Ravidass Bhavan, Birmingham

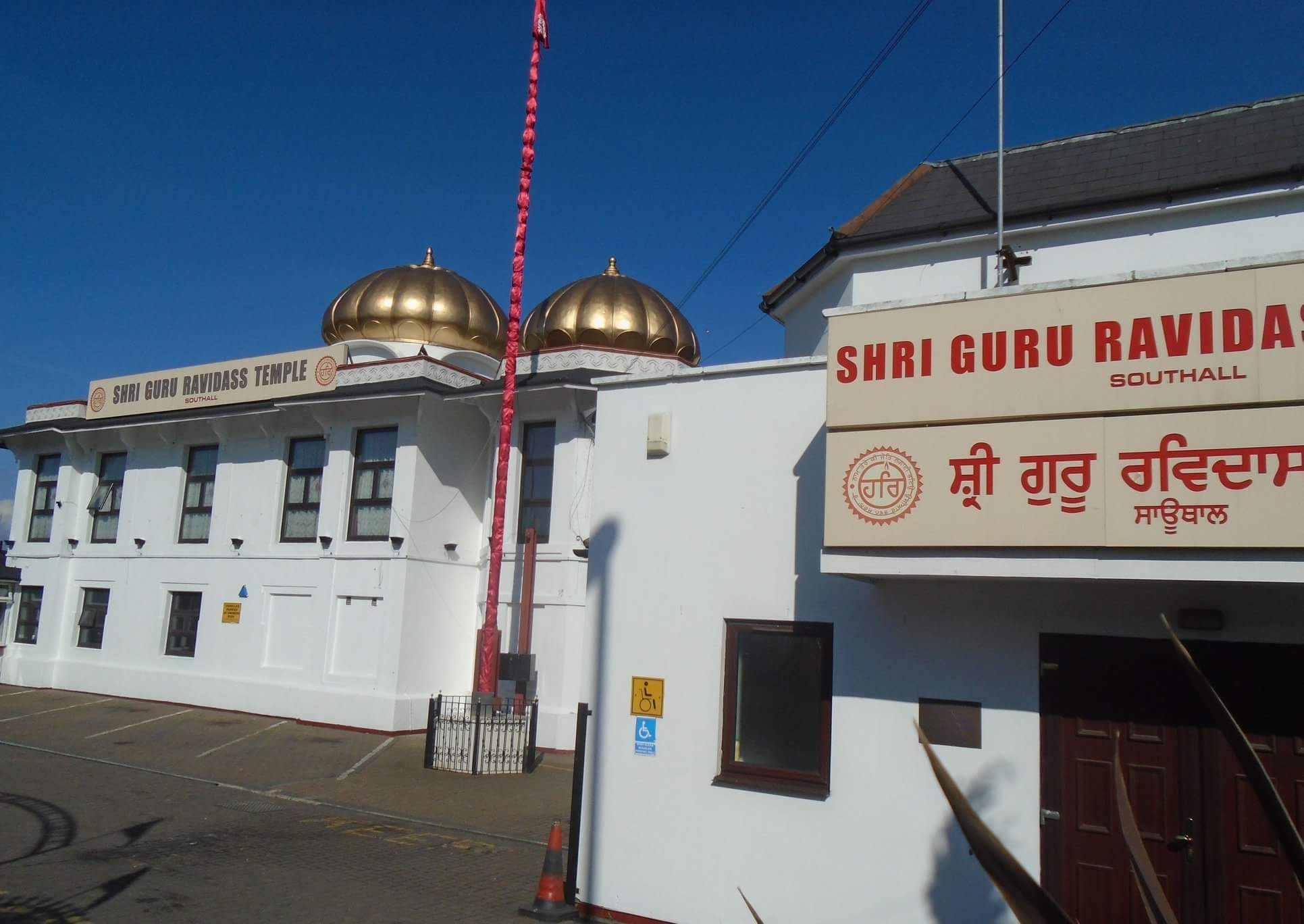
Gurdwara Guru Ravidass Sabha, Southall

== Demographics ==
=== Castes and tribes ===
Among the major castes and tribes of West Punjab (Pakistan) are the Jats, Rajputs, Arains, Gujjars and Awans. Prior to the partition in 1947, major communities of West Punjab also included the Khatris, Aroras and Brahmins.

While in East Punjab (India), Jats are almost 20 per cent of East Punjab's population. The Scheduled Castes constitute almost 32 per cent of its total population and 4.3 per cent of the SCs nationally, official data show. Of more than 35 designated Scheduled Castes in the state, the Mazhabis, the Ravidasias/Ramdasias, the Ad Dharmis, the Valmikis, and the Bazigars together make up around 87 per cent of East Punjab's total Scheduled Caste population. The Ravidasia Hindus/Ad-Dharmi and the Ramdasia Sikhs together constitute 34.93 per cent of East Punjab's total Scheduled Caste population and 11.15 per cent of Punjab Population. Ramdasia, Ad-Dharmi and Ravidassias are subgroups of the Chamar and are traditionally linked to leather-related occupations.

=== Religions in Punjab ===
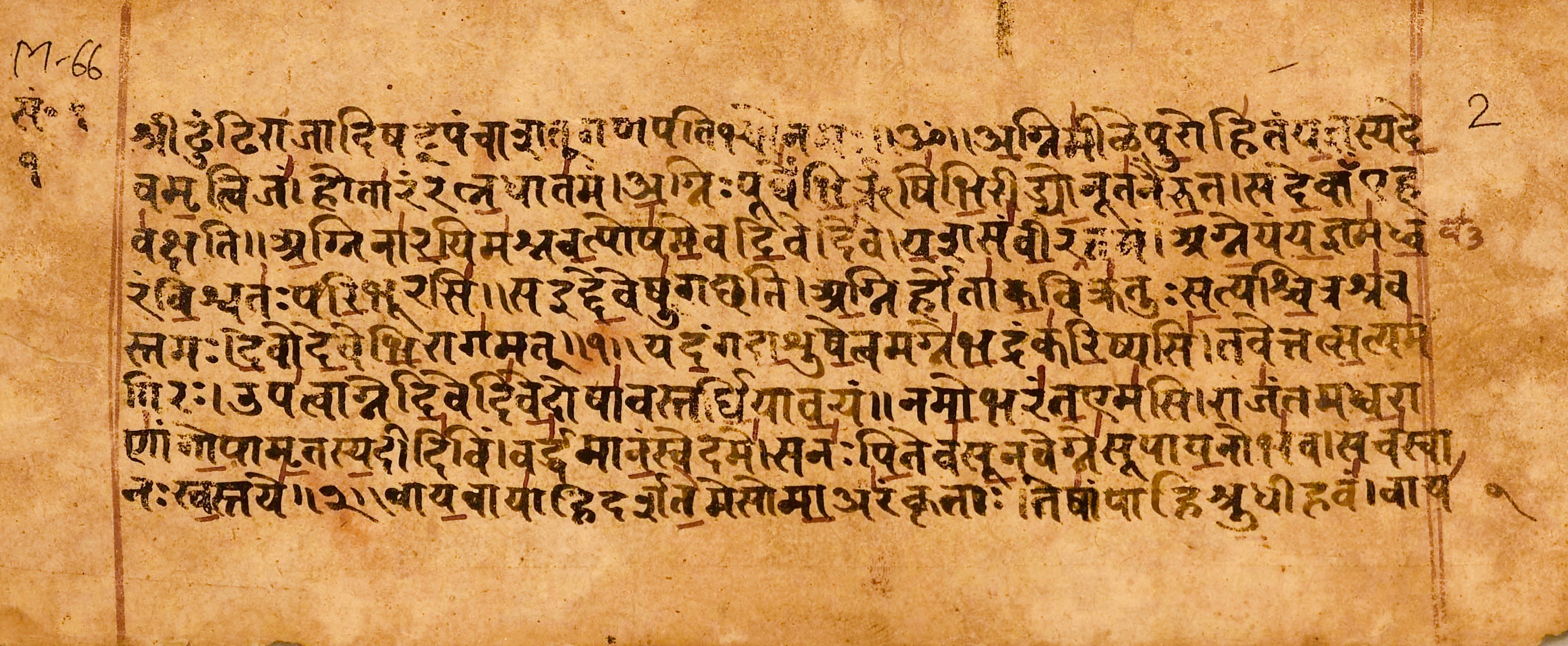
Rig Veda is the oldest Hindu text that originated in the Punjab region.

Proto-Hinduism is the oldest of the religions practised by the Punjabi people. The historical Vedic religion constituted the religious ideas and practices in the Punjab during the Vedic period (1500–500 BCE), centred primarily in the worship of Indra. (Note: Michaels (2004, p. 38): "The legacy of the Vedic religion in Hinduism is generally overestimated. The influence of the mythology is indeed great, but the religious terminology changed considerably: all the key terms of Hinduism either do not exist in Vedic or have a completely different meaning. The religion of the Veda does not know the ethicised migration of the soul with retribution for acts (karma), the cyclical destruction of the world, or the idea of salvation during one's lifetime (jivanmukti; moksa; nirvana); the idea of the world as illusion (maya) must have gone against the grain of ancient India, and an omnipotent creator god emerges only in the late hymns of the rgveda. Nor did the Vedic religion know a caste system, the burning of widows, the ban on remarriage, images of gods and temples, Puja worship, Yoga, pilgrimages, vegetarianism, the holiness of cows, the doctrine of stages of life (asrama), or knew them only at their inception. Thus, it is justified to see a turning point between the Vedic religion and Hindu religions." Jamison, Stephanie; Witzel, Michael (1992). "Vedic Hinduism" (PDF). Harvard University. p. 3.: "... to call this period Vedic Hinduism is a contradictio in terminis since Vedic religion is very different from what we generally call Hindu religion – at least as much as Old Hebrew religion is from medieval and modern Christian religion. However, Vedic religion is treatable as a predecessor of Hinduism." See also Halbfass 1991, pp. 1–2) The bulk of the Rigveda was composed in the Punjab region between circa 1500 and 1200 BC, while later Vedic scriptures were composed more eastwards, between the Yamuna and Ganges rivers. An ancient Indian law book called the Manusmriti, developed by Brahmin Hindu priests, shaped Punjabi religious life from 200 BC onward.

Later, the spread of Buddhisim and Jainism in the Indian subcontinent saw the growth of Buddhism and Jainism in the Punjab. Islam was introduced via southern Punjab in the 8th century, becoming the majority by the 16th century, via local conversion. There was a small Jain community left in Punjab by the 16th century, while the Buddhist community had largely disappeared by the turn of the 10th century. The region became predominantly Muslim due to missionary Sufi saints whose dargahs dot the landscape of the Punjab region.

The rise of Sikhism in the 1700s saw some Punjabis, both Hindu and Muslim, accepting the new Sikh faith. A number of Punjabis during the colonial period of India became Christians, with all of these religions characterising the religious diversity now found in the Punjab region.

=== Modern era ===
Due to religious tensions, emigration between Punjabi people started far before the partition and dependable records. Shortly prior to the Partition of India, Punjab Province (British India) had a slight majority Muslim population at about 53.2% in 1941, which was an increase from the previous years.

Due to the partition of 1947, a rapid shift towards religious homogeneity occurred in all districts across the Punjab region owing to the new international border that cut through the province. This rapid demographic shift was primarily due to mass migration and population exchange but also caused by large-scale religious cleansing riots that occurred across the region at the time. According to historical demographer Tim Dyson, in the eastern regions of Punjab that ultimately became Indian Punjab following independence, districts that were 66% Hindu in 1941 became 80% Hindu in 1951; those that were 20% Sikh became 50% Sikh in 1951. Conversely, in the western regions of Punjab that ultimately became Pakistani Punjab, all districts became almost exclusively Muslim by 1951.

As a result of the population exchanges during partition, both parts of Punjab are now relatively homogeneous, as far as religion is concerned. Today the majority of Pakistani Punjabis follow Islam with a small Christian minority, and less Sikh and Hindu populations, while the majority of Indian Punjabis are either Sikhs or Hindus with a Muslim minority. Punjab is also the birthplace of Sikhism and the movement Ahmadiyya.

==== Punjabi Muslims ====
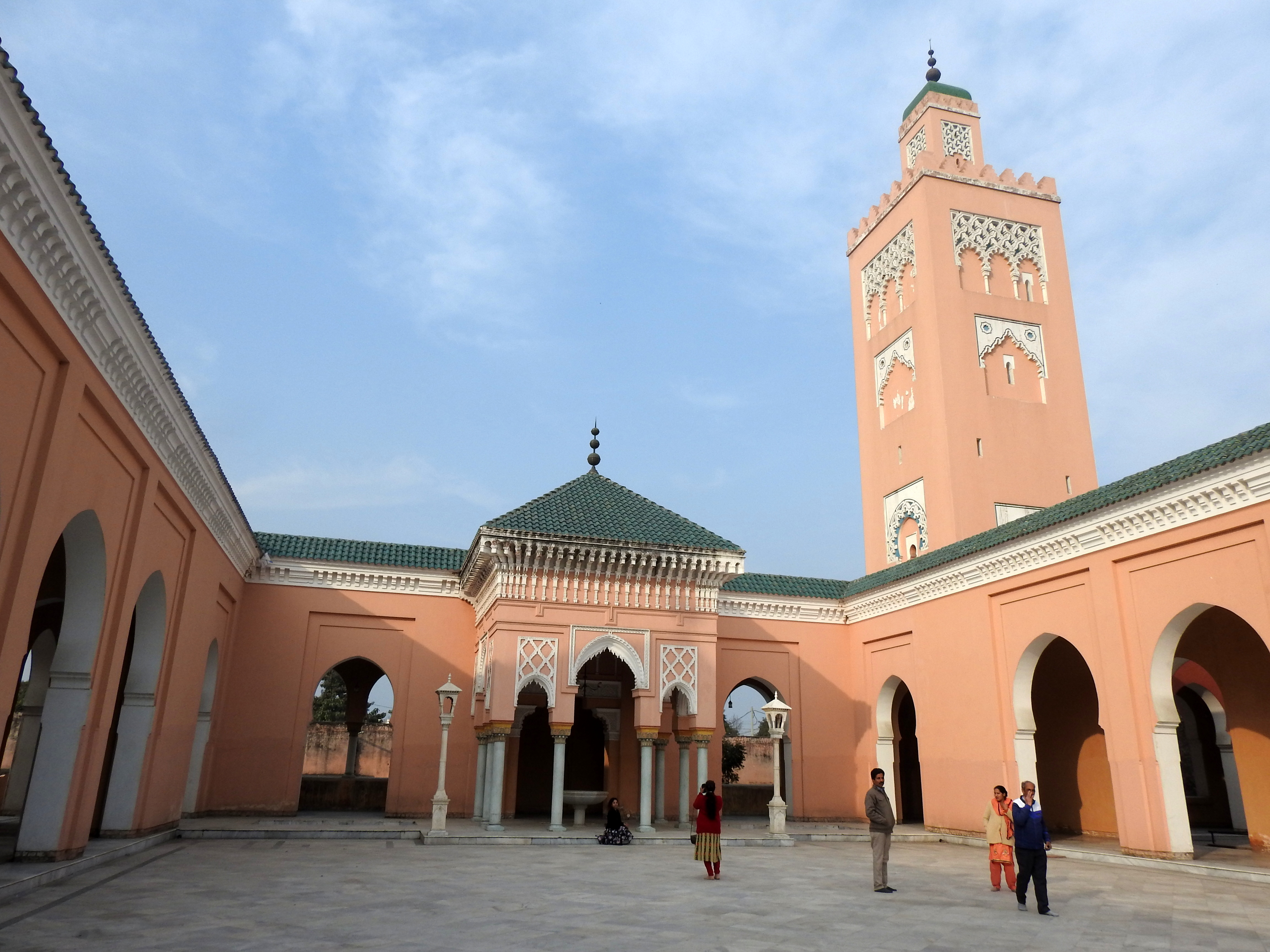
Moorish Mosque in Kapurthala, Punjab, India.

Punjabi Muslims are found almost exclusively in Pakistan with 97% of Punjabis who live in Pakistan following Islam, in contrast to Punjabi Sikhs and Punjabi Hindus who predominantly live in India. A significant minority of Punjabi Muslims exist in India, particularly around Malerkotla, Qadian, and Sirhind and smaller numbers in Delhi and Mumbai.

Forming the majority of the Punjabi ethnicity in the greater Punjab region, Punjabi Muslims write the Punjabi language under the Perso-Arabic script known as Shahmukhi. With a population of more than 80 million, they are the largest ethnic group in Pakistan and the world's third-largest Islam-adhering ethnicity after Arabs and Bengalis. The majority of Punjabi Muslims are adherents of Sunni Islam, while a minority adhere to Shia Islam and other sects, including the Ahmadiyya community which originated in Punjab during the British Raj.

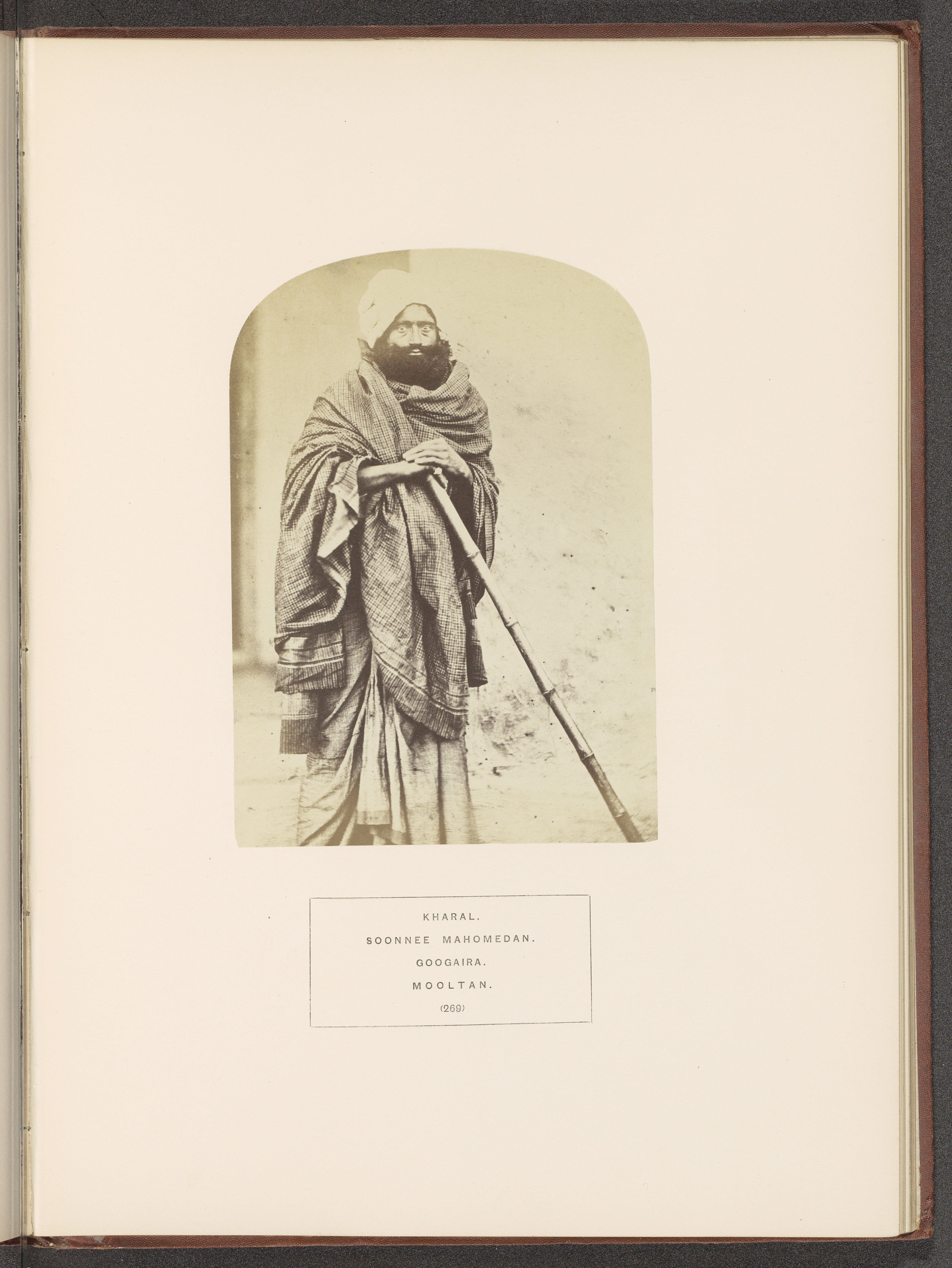
Punjabi Muslim of Kharal tribe from Multan

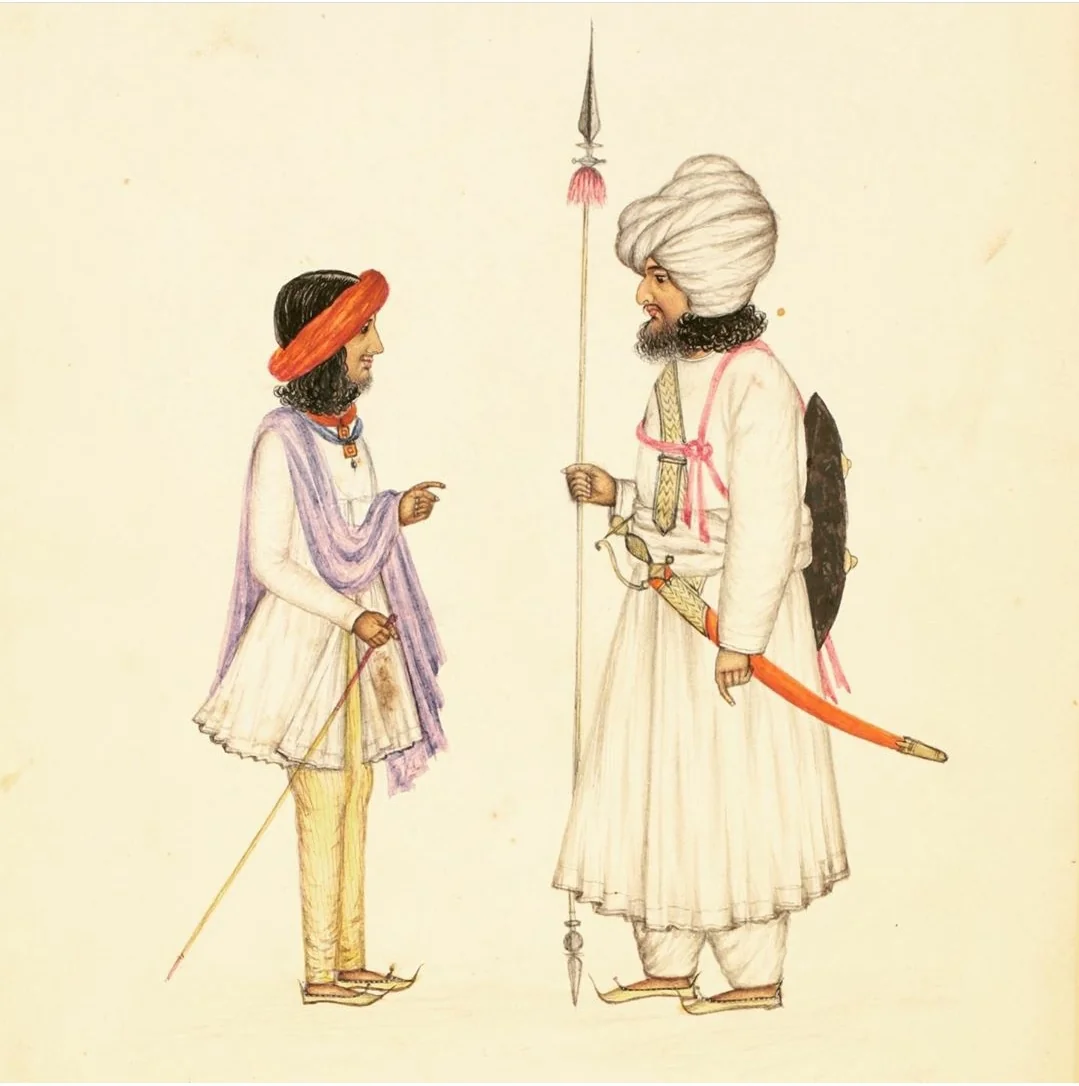
Pahari-Pothwari Muslim

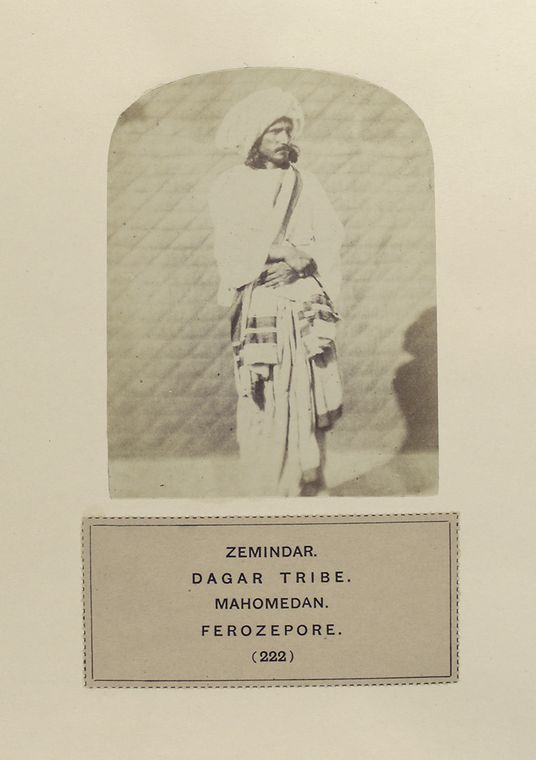
Punjabi Muslim, Firuzpur

==== Punjabi Hindus ====
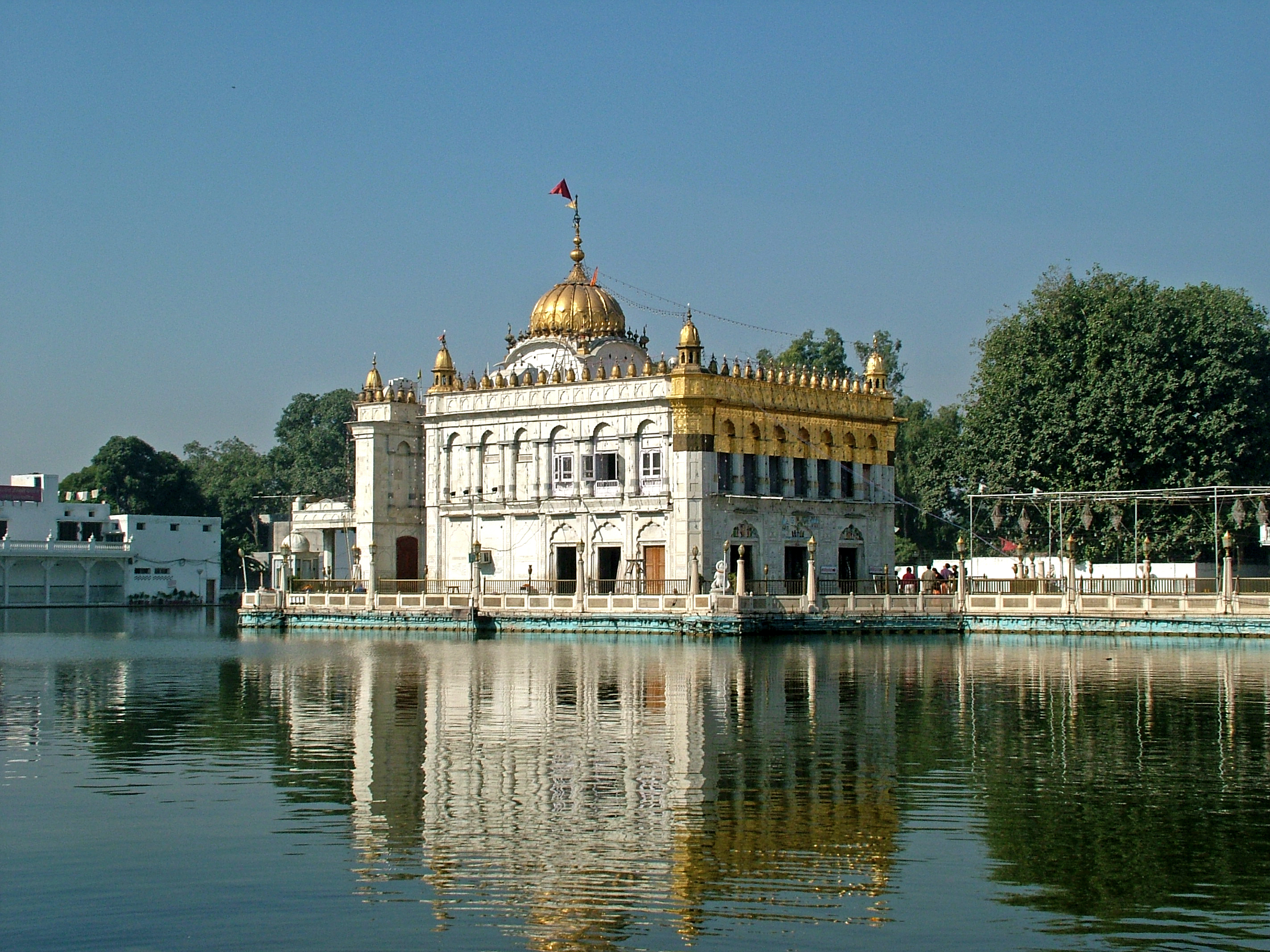
The Durgiana Temple in Amritsar, Punjab, India.

Punjabi Hindus in India use Nāgarī script to write the Hindi and Punjabi languages. In the Indian state of Punjab, Punjabi Hindus make up approximately 38.5% of the state's population; numbering 10.7 million and are a majority in the Doaba region. Punjabi Hindus form a majority in five districts of Punjab, namely, Pathankot, Jalandhar, Hoshiarpur, Fazilka and Shaheed Bhagat Singh Nagar districts.

During the 1947 partition, millions of Punjabi Hindus (including Hindkowan Hindus and Saraiki Hindus) migrated from West Punjab and North-West Frontier Province, of which many ultimately settled in Delhi. Determined from 1991 and 2015 estimates, Punjabi Hindus form approximately 24 to 35 per cent of Delhi's population; (Note: "The most important section among settlers is the Punjabis who are estimated to constitute around 35 per cent of the population.") (Note: "Though Punjabis constitute a mere twenty-four per cent of so of the capital city's population, on average they hold fifty-three per cent of the available managerial positions.") based on 2011 official census counts, this amounts to between 4,029,106 and 5,875,779 people.

Additionally, in the Indian state of Haryana, Punjabi Hindus form approximately 8 to 10 per cent of the total population; based on 2011 official census counts out of a total population of 25.4 million, this amounts to between 2.03 and 2.54 million people. (Note: Punjabi Hindus represent between 8 and 10 per cent of Haryana's population, determined from 2014, 2019, 2024, and 2025 estimates. Based on the 2011 official census counts out of a total population of 25,351,462, this amounts to between 2,028,117 and 2,535,146 persons.) Similar to Delhi, most Punjabi Hindus in Haryana can trace their ancestry to West Punjab and North-West Frontier Province due to mass migration associated with the 1947 partition. In the contemporary era, Punjabi Hindus are influential in Haryana state politics. (Note: “Punjabis constitute about eight per cent of the state’s population, they are a can’t-be-ignored political constituency.") (Note: “Political experts attribute the rise of the BJP in the region to sustained consolidation among certain communities, especially the Punjabis who account for 8% of the state’s estimated population of around 28 million.”) (Note: “From the announcement of candidates to the election campaign, the Congress primarily focused on the 22-25 per cent Jat and 20-22 per cent Scheduled Caste voters. In contrast, the BJP, in line with its non-Jat strategy, focused on the 30-32 per cent OBCs, 9-10 per cent Punjabis and 8-9 per cent Brahmins.”) (Note: “The Punjabi population of Haryana is considered to be 10 per cent of the total population of the state. Many constituencies even put this figure at around 14 per cent. Of this population, 4 per cent are Sikhs and the rest are Hindus.”)

Following the large scale exodus that took place during the 1947 partition, there remains a small Punjabi Hindu community in Pakistan today. According to the 2017 Census, there are about 200,000 Hindus in Punjab province, forming approximately 0.2% of the total population. Much of the community resides in the primarily rural South Punjab districts of Rahim Yar Khan and Bahawalpur where they form 3.12% and 1.12% of the population respectively, while the rest are concentrated in urban centres such as Lahore.

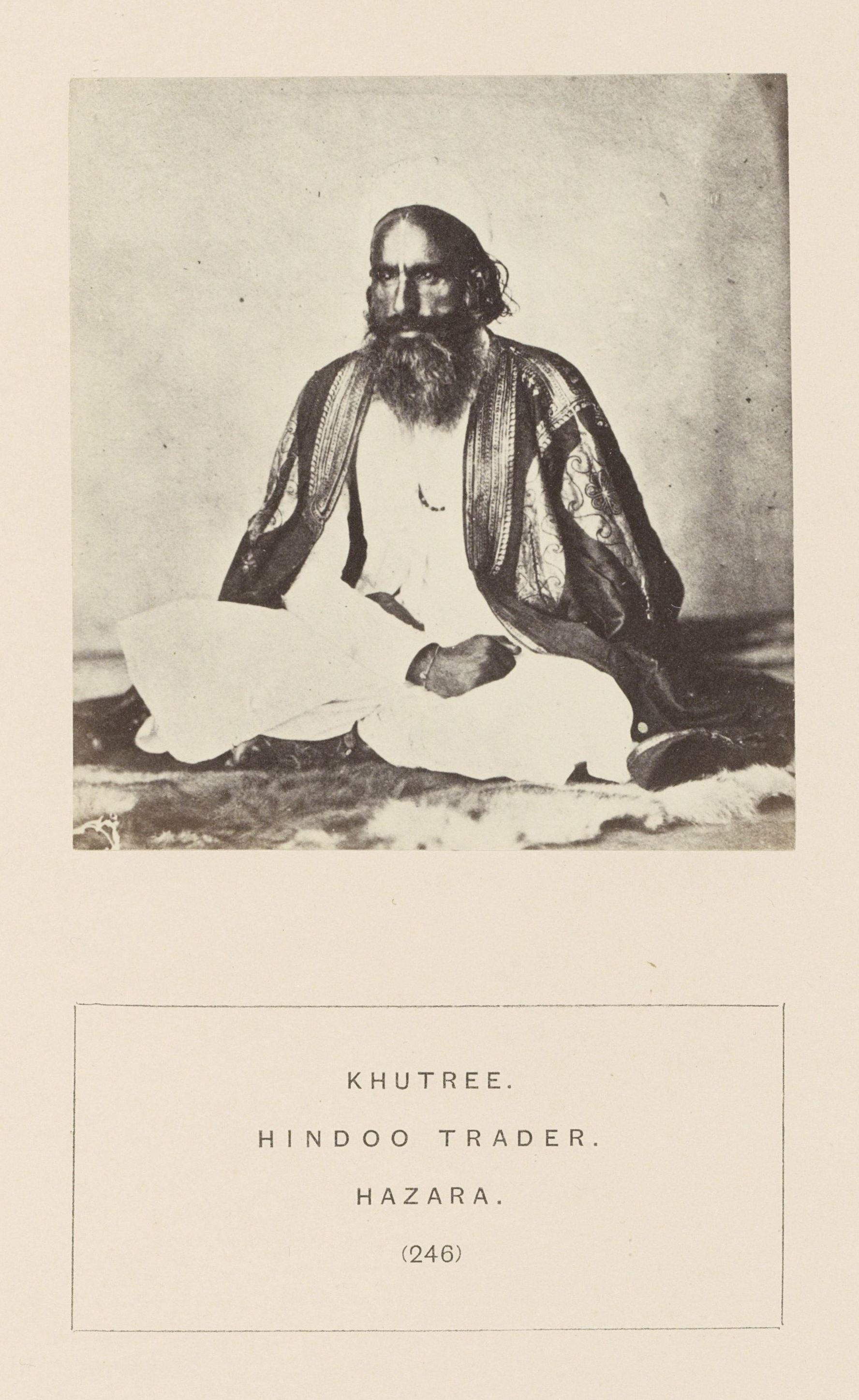
A Hindu Khatri Trader of Hazara, ca. 1868-1872

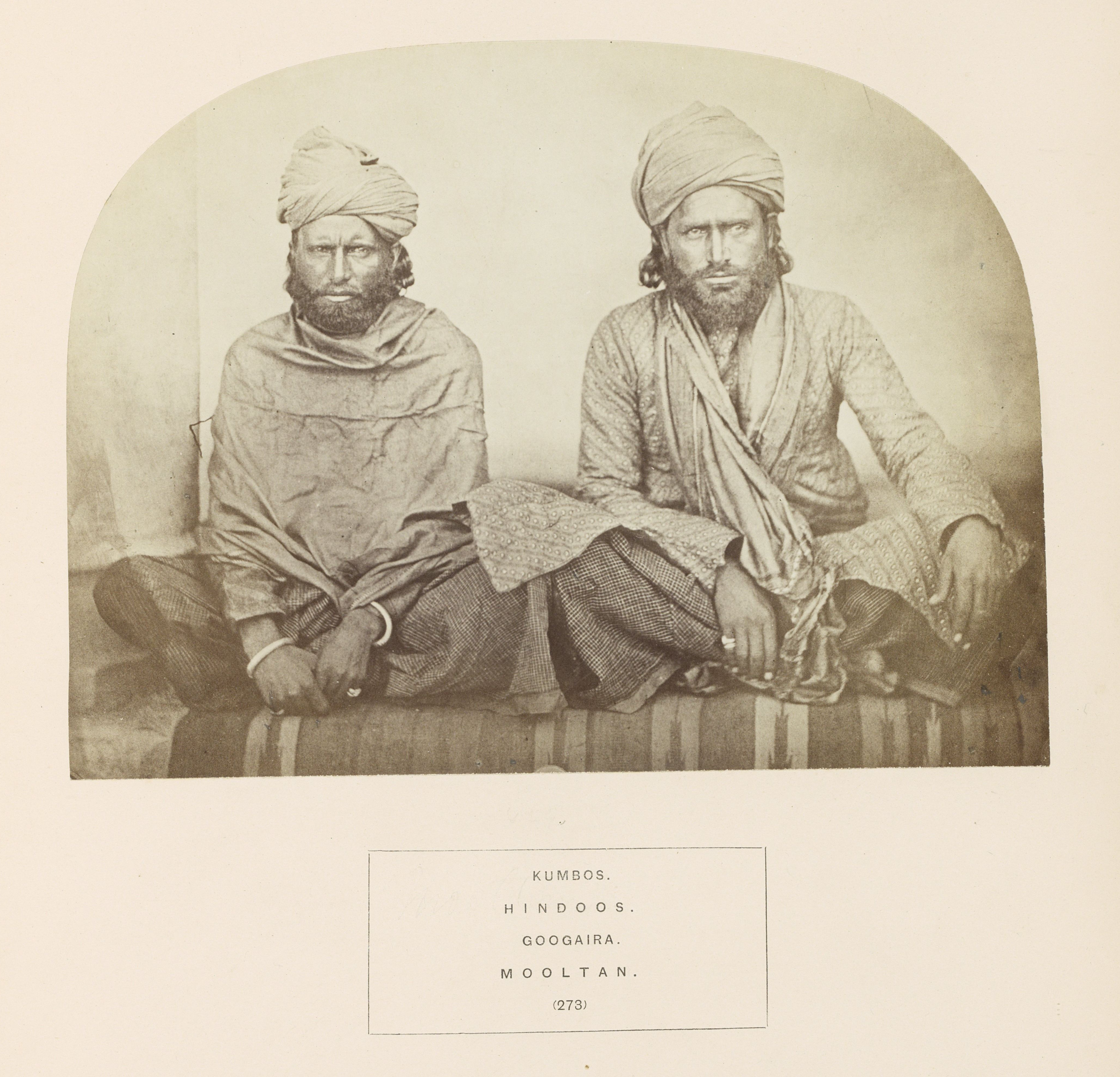
Hindu Kamboj of Multan, ca.1862-72

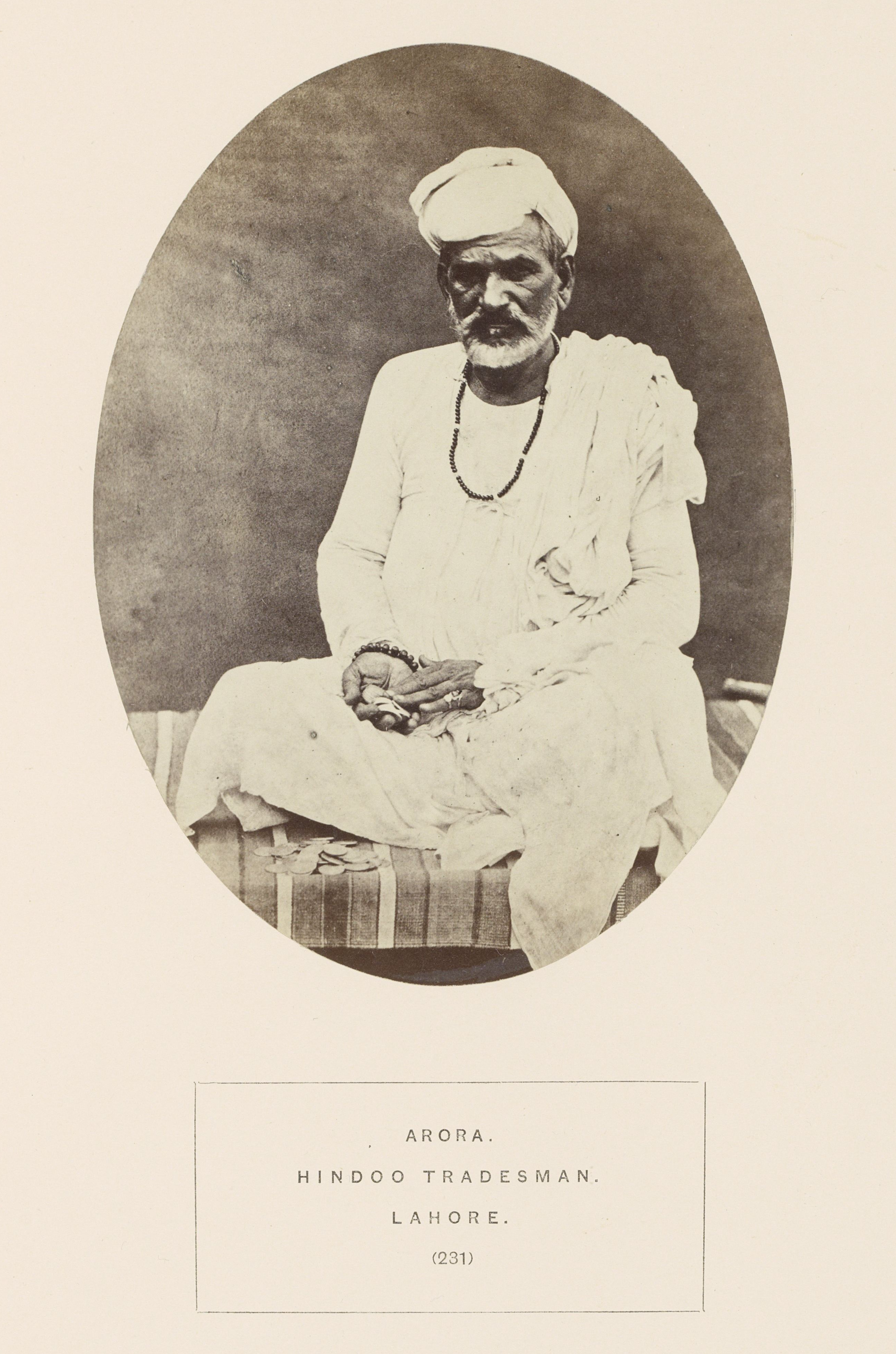
A Hindu Arora Trader of Lahore, ca.1862-72

==== Punjabi Sikhs ====
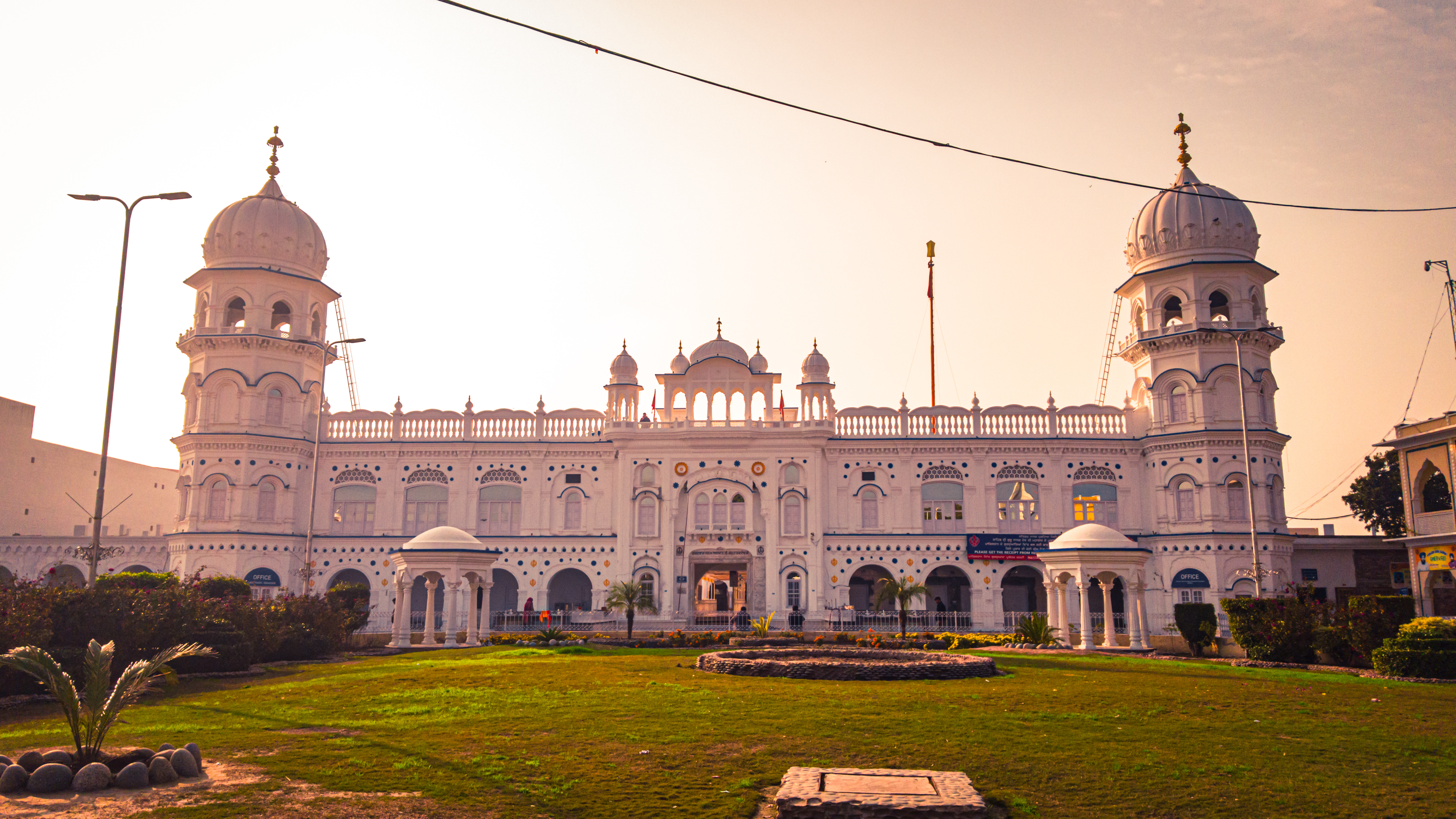
The Gurdwara Janam Asthan in Nankana Sahib, Punjab, Pakistan.

Sikhism from Sikh, meaning a "disciple", or a "learner", is a monotheistic religion originated in the Punjab region of the Indian subcontinent during the 15th century. The fundamental beliefs of Sikhism, articulated in the sacred scripture Guru Granth Sahib, include faith and meditation on the name of the one creator, unity and equality of all humankind, engaging in selfless service, striving for social justice for the benefit and prosperity of all, and honest conduct and livelihood while living a householder's life. Being one of the youngest amongst the major world religions, with 25-28 million adherents worldwide, Sikhism is the eighth-largest religion in the world.

The Sikhs form a majority of close to 58% in the modern day Punjab, India.

Gurmukhi is the writing script used by Sikhs and for scriptures of Sikhism. It is used in official documents in parts of India and elsewhere. The tenth Guru of Sikhs, Guru Gobind Singh (1666 – 1708) established the Khalsa Brotherhood, and set for them a code of conduct.

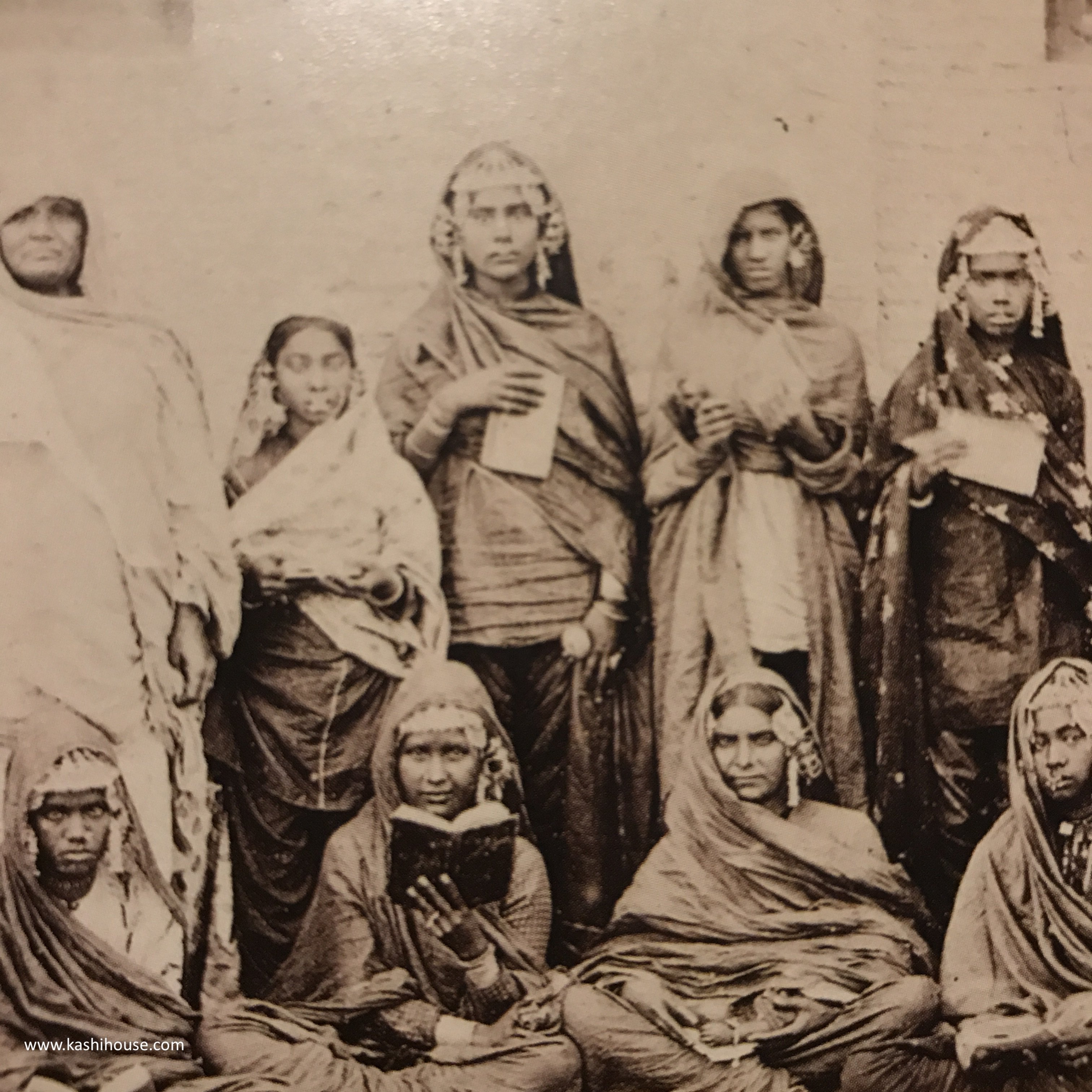
Photograph of Sikh girls enrolled in a school run by the Church Missionary School, Amritsar, 1875

==== Punjabi Christians ====
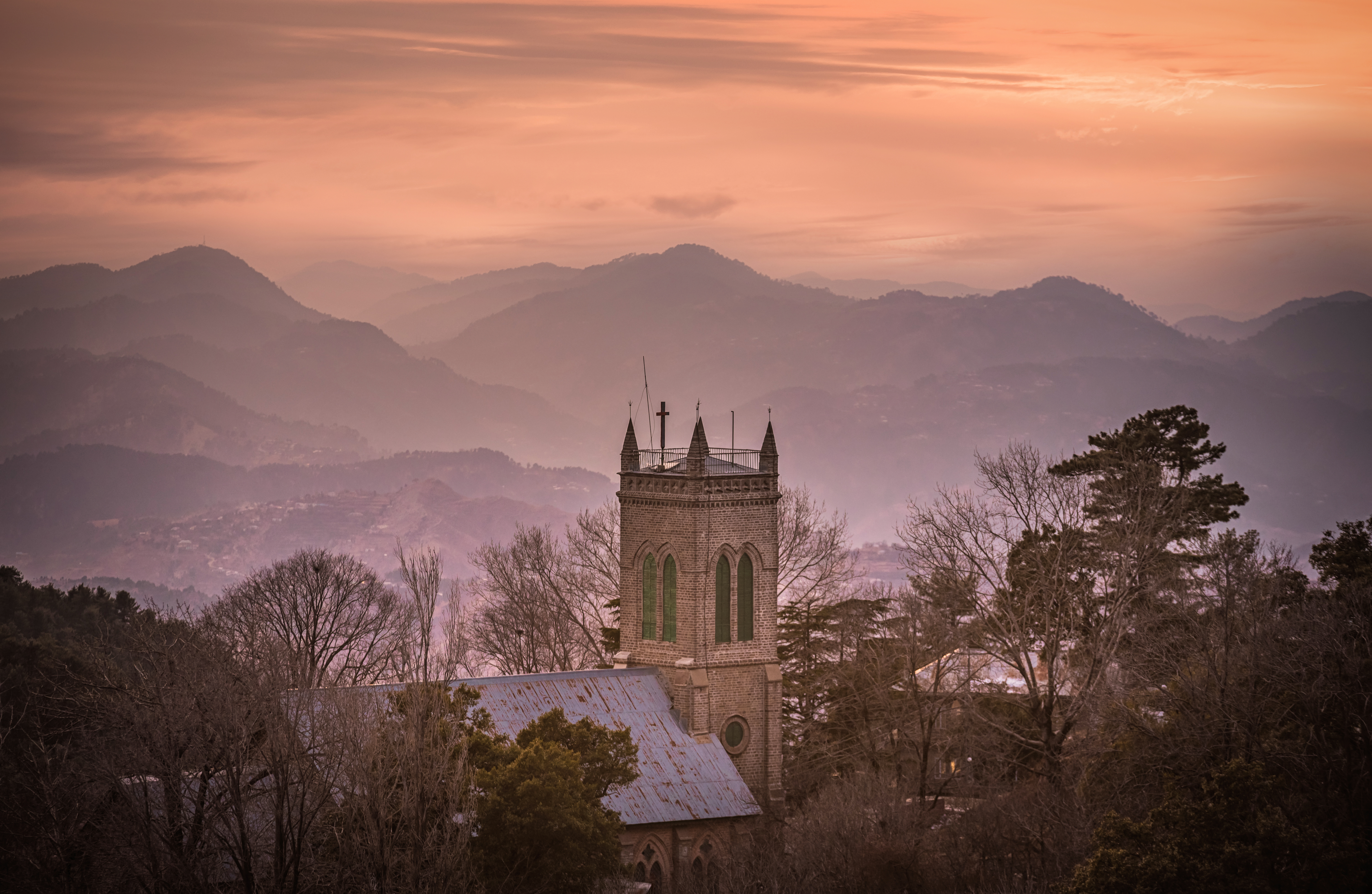
The Holy Trinity Church in Murree, Punjab, Pakistan.

Most of the modern Punjabi Christians are descended from converts during British rule; initially, conversions to Christianity came from the "upper levels of Punjab society, from the privileged and prestigious", including "high caste" Hindu families, as well as Muslim families. However, other modern Punjabi Christians have converted from the Chuhra group. The Churas were largely converted to Christianity in North India during the British Raj. The vast majority were converted from the Hindu Chura communities of Punjab, and to a lesser extent Mazhabi Sikhs; under the influence of enthusiastic army officers and Christian missionaries. Large numbers of Mazhabi Sikhs were also converted in the Moradabad district and the Bijnor district of Uttar Pradesh. Rohilkhand saw a mass conversion of its entire population of 4500 Mazhabi Sikhs into the Methodist Church. Sikh organisations became alarmed at the rate of conversions among high caste Sikh families, and as a result, they responded by immediately dispatching Sikh missionaries to counteract the conversions.

== Culture ==
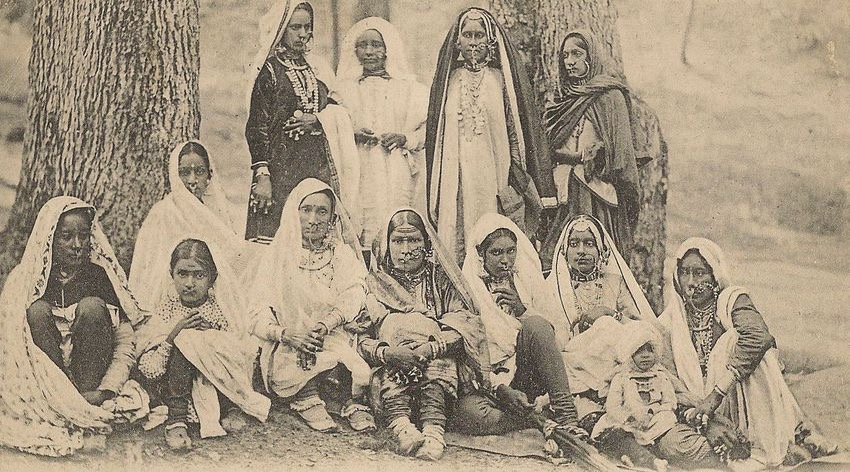
Photograph of a group of Punjabi women, 1905

Punjabi culture grew out of the settlements along the five rivers, which served as an important route to the Near East as early as the ancient Indus Valley civilisation, dating back to 3000 BCE. Agriculture has been the major economic feature of the Punjab and has therefore formed the foundation of Punjabi culture, with one's social status being determined by landownership. The Punjab emerged as an important agricultural region, especially following the Green Revolution during the mid-1960s to the mid-1970s, has been described as the "breadbasket of both India and Pakistan". Besides being known for agriculture and trade, the Punjab is also a region that over the centuries has experienced many foreign invasions and consequently has a long-standing history of warfare, as the Punjab is situated on the principal route of invasions through the northwestern frontier of the Indian subcontinent, which promoted to adopt a lifestyle that entailed engaging in warfare to protect the land. Warrior culture typically elevates the value of the community's honour (izzat), which is highly esteemed by Punjabis.

=== Language ===
Punjabi, sometimes spelled Panjabi, (Note: Punjabi is the British English spelling, and Pañjābī is the romanised spelling from the native script(s).) is an Indo-Aryan language natively spoken by the Punjabi people.

Punjabi is the most popular first language in Pakistan, with 80.5 million native speakers as per the 2017 census, and the 11th most popular in India, with 31.1 million native speakers, as per the 2011 census.

The language is spoken among a significant overseas diaspora, particularly in Canada, the United States, and the United Kingdom.

In Pakistan, Punjabi is written using the Shahmukhi alphabet, based on the Perso-Arabic script; in India, it is written using the Gurmukhi alphabet, based on the Indic scripts. Punjabi is unusual among the Indo-Aryan languages and the broader Indo-European language family in its usage of lexical tone.

Punjabi developed from Prakrit languages and later Apabhraṃśa (Sanskrit: अपभ्रंश, 'deviated' or 'non-grammatical speech') From 600 BCE, Sanskrit was advocated as official language and Prakrit gave birth to many regional languages in different parts of India. All these languages are called Prakrit (Sanskrit: प्राकृत, prākṛta) collectively. Paishachi, Shauraseni and Gandhari were Prakrit languages, which were spoken in north and north-western India and Punjabi developed from one of these Prakrits. Later in northern India, these Prakrits gave rise to their own Apabhraṃśa, a descendant of Prakrit. Punjabi emerged as an Apabhraṃśa, a degenerated form of Prakrit, in the 7th century CE and became stable by the 10th century. The earliest writings in Punjabi belong to Nath Yogi era from 9th to 14th century CE. The language of these compositions is morphologically closer to Shauraseni Apbhramsa, though vocabulary and rhythm is surcharged with extreme colloquialism and folklore. The Arabic and modern Persian influence in the historical Punjab region began with the late first millennium Muslim conquests on the Indian subcontinent. Many Persian and Arabic words were incorporated in Punjabi. So Punjabi relies heavily on Persian and Arabic words which are used with a liberal approach to language. After the fall of the Sikh empire, Urdu was made the official language of Punjab (in Pakistani Punjab, it is still the primary official language), and influenced the language as well.

Punjabis also speak several languages and dialects related to Punjabi, such as the Pahari-Pothwari and Chhachhi dialects spoken in the Pothohar region of Northern Pakistani Punjab

=== Traditional dress ===
Kaintha

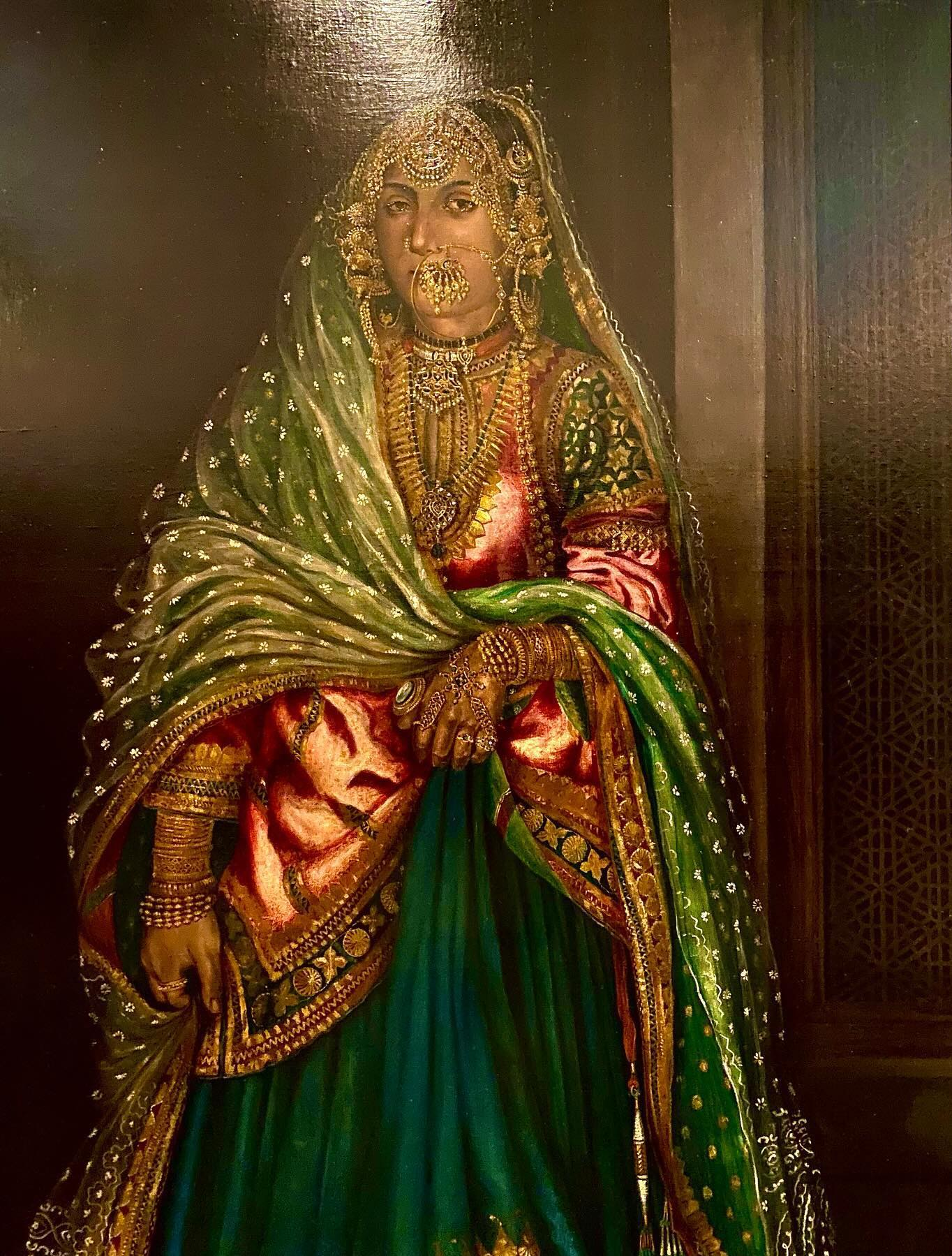
Painting of a native lady of Amritsar, ca.1880's

The Kaintha, a traditional necklace which is usually made out of gold or steel, is an integral element of Punjabi clothing. It is adorned with a pendant that stands out from the rest of the necklace, which is accompanied by matching colour schemes as well as yarn in the back to hold the piece together. It is worn with the Shalwar Kameez alongside a shawl, chunni, or vest. Men and women alike traditionally wear the Kaintha to the Mayian and Jaggo ceremonies. It is also commonly worn while performing the traditional Bhangra and Giddha dances

Phulkari

A traditional element of Punjabi clothing has been the Phulkari. The phulkari is folk embroidery that was typically inclusive of work in floral patterns but has taken on a larger aspect of including geometrical shapes, symbols and motifs relevant to the culture. This pattern has been worn by women for hundreds of years in very vibrant colours. The pattern is typically stitched with woven silk and colourful thread. The phulkari pattern is adorned onto dupattas/chunis, better known as a decorative scarf. Over time the phulkari pattern has taken onto embellishments onto suits, dresses, accessories and more. You will see women wearing phulkari during important religious and cultural folk celebrations (i.e.: Vaisakhi, Lohri) and then in wedding celebrations such as the Jago.

Dastar

A Dastar is an item of headgear associated with Sikhism and is an important part of the Punjabi and Sikh culture. Among the Sikhs, the dastār is an article of faith that represents equality, honour, self-respect, courage, spirituality, and piety. The Khalsa Sikh men and women, who keep the Five Ks, wear the turban to cover their long, uncut hair (kesh). The Sikhs regard the dastār as an important part of the unique Sikh identity. After the ninth Sikh Guru, Tegh Bahadur, was sentenced to death by the Mughal emperor Aurangzeb, Guru Gobind Singh, the tenth Sikh Guru created the Khalsa and gave five articles of faith, one of which is unshorn hair, which the dastār covers. Prior to Sikhi, only kings, royalty, and those of high stature wore turbans, but Sikh Gurus adopted the practice to assert equality and sovereignty among people.

Punjabi suit

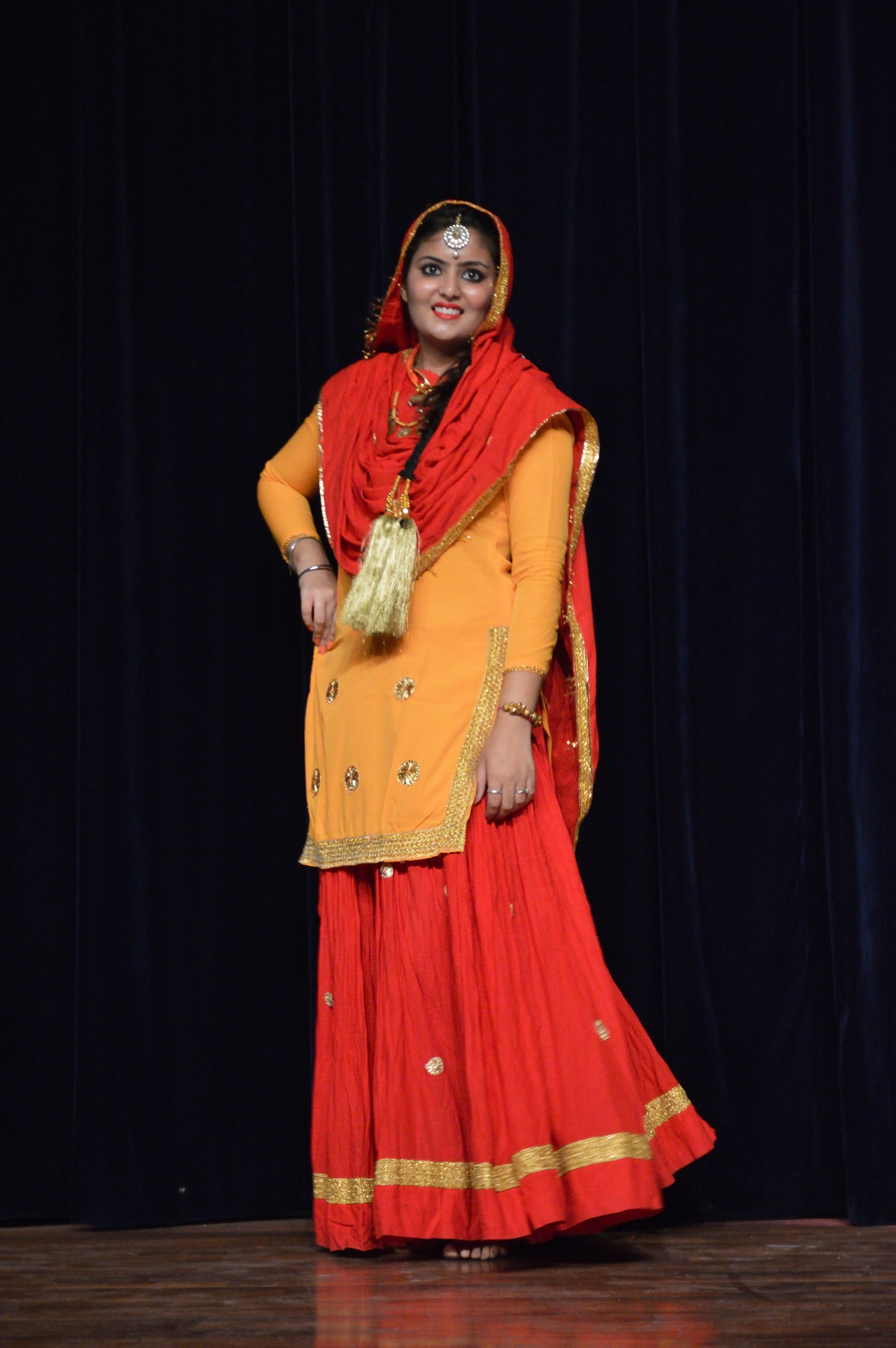
Punjabi traditional dress Ghagra in India

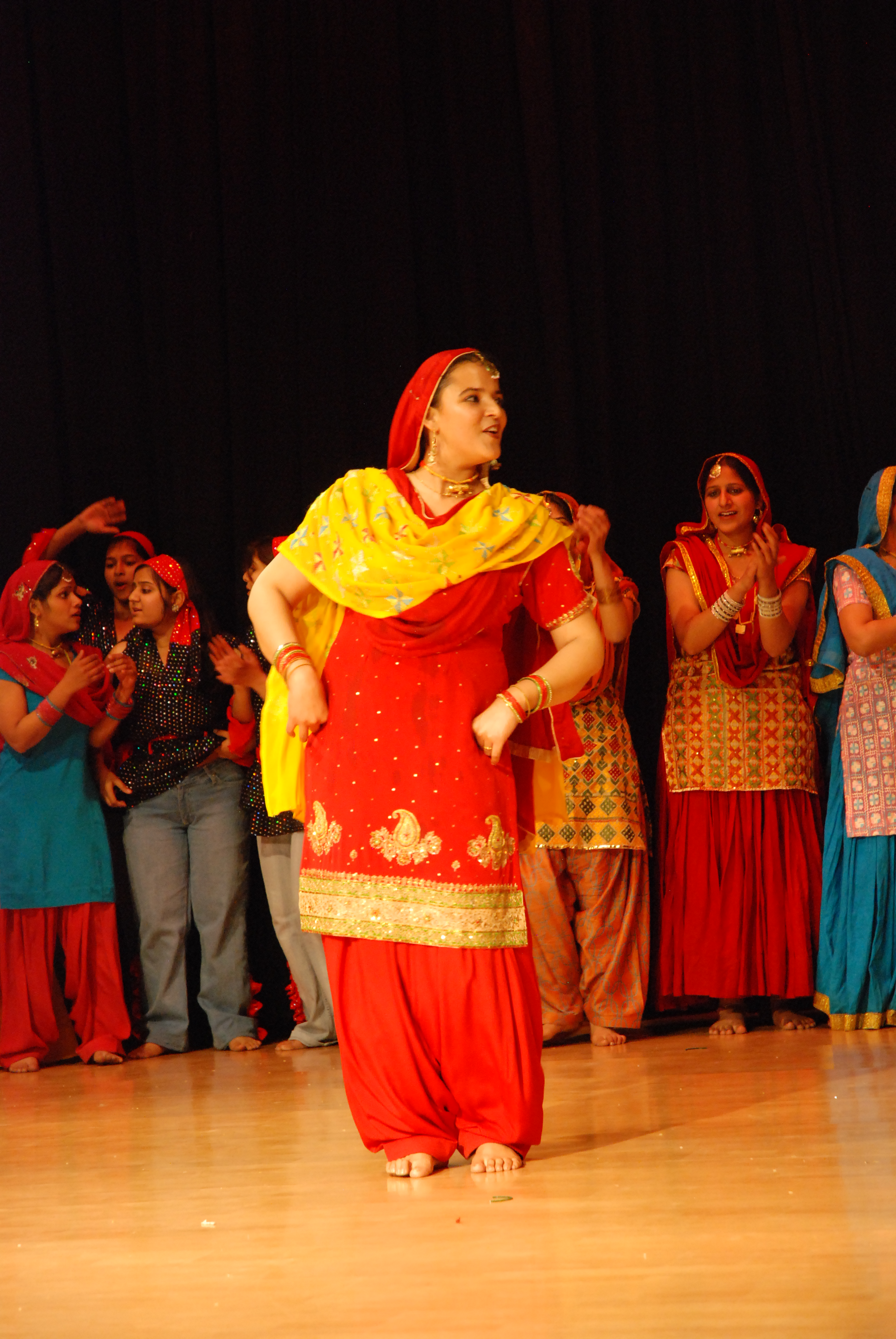
Punjabi traditional dress

A Punjabi suit that features two items - a qameez (top), salwar (bottom) is the traditional attire of the Punjabi people. Shalwars are trousers which are atypically wide at the waist but which narrow to a cuffed bottom. They are held up by a drawstring or elastic belt, which causes them to become pleated around the waist. The trousers can be wide and baggy, or they can be cut quite narrow, on the bias. The kameez is a long shirt or tunic. The side seams are left open below the waist-line (the opening known as the chaak (Note: A Dictionary of Urdu, Classical Hindi, and English: chāk derives from the Persian "چاك ćāk, Fissure, cleft, rent, slit, a narrow opening (intentionally left in clothes).")), which gives the wearer greater freedom of movement. The kameez is usually cut straight and flat; older kameez use traditional cuts; modern kameez are more likely to have European-inspired set-in sleeves. The combination garment is sometimes called salwar kurta, salwar suit, or Punjabi suit. The shalwar-kameez is a widely-worn, and national dress, of Pakistan. When women wear the shalwar-kameez in some regions, they usually wear a long scarf or shawl called a dupatta around the head or neck. The dupatta is also employed as a form of modesty—although it is made of delicate material, it obscures the upper body's contours by passing over the shoulders. For Muslim women, the dupatta is a less stringent alternative to the chador or burqa (see hijab and purdah); for Sikh and Hindu women, the dupatta is useful when the head must be covered, as in a temple or the presence of elders. Everywhere in South Asia, modern versions of the attire have evolved; the shalwars are worn lower down on the waist, the kameez have shorter length, with higher splits, lower necklines and backlines, and with cropped sleeves or without sleeves.

=== Music ===
Bhangra describes dance-oriented popular music with Punjabi rhythms, developed since the 1980s. Sufi music and Qawali, commonly practised in Punjab, Pakistan; are other important genres in the Punjab region.

=== Dance ===
Punjabi dances are performed either by men or by women. The dances range from solo to group dances and also sometimes dances are done along with traditional musical instruments. Bhangra is one of the most famous dances originating in the Punjab by farmers during the harvesting season. It was mainly performed while farmers did agricultural chores. As they did each farming activity they would perform bhangra moves on the spot. This allowed them to finish their job in a pleasurable way. For many years, farmers performed bhangra to showcase a sense of accomplishment and to welcome the new harvesting season. Traditional bhangra is performed in a circle and is performed using traditional dance steps. Traditional bhangra is now also performed on occasions other than during the harvest season.

=== Folk tales ===
The folk tales of Punjab include Heer Ranjha, Mirza Sahiban, Sohni Mahiwal.

=== Festivals ===
The Punjabi Muslims typically observe the Islamic festivals. The Punjabi Sikhs and Hindus typically do not observe these, and instead observe Lohri, Basant and Vaisakhi as seasonal festivals. The Punjabi Muslim festivals are set according to the lunar Islamic calendar (Hijri), and the date falls earlier by 10 to 13 days from year to year. The Hindu and Sikh Punjabi seasonal festivals are set on specific dates of the luni-solar Bikrami calendar or Punjabi calendar and the date of the festival also typically varies in the Gregorian calendar but stays within the same two Gregorian months.

Some Punjabi Muslims participate in the traditional, seasonal festivals of the Punjab region: Baisakhi, Basant and to a minor scale Lohri, but this is controversial. Islamic clerics and some politicians have attempted to ban this participation because of the religious basis of the Punjabi festivals, and they being declared haram (forbidden in Islam).

=== Punjabi State ===
According to Pippa Virdee, the 1947 partition of India and Pakistan has shadowed the sense of loss of what used to be a homeland nation for the Punjabi people in the Indian subcontinent and its diaspora. Since the mid-1980s, there has been a drive for Punjabi cultural revival, consolidation of Punjabi ethnicity and a virtual Punjabi nation. According to Giorgio Shani, this is predominantly a Sikh ethno-nationalism movement led by some Sikh organisations, and a view that is not shared by Punjabi people organisations belonging to other religions.

== See also ==
- Punjabi culture
- Punjabi folklore
- Punjabi literature
- Punjabi press
- Punjabi cuisine
- Punjabi diaspora

== Bibliography ==
- Dyson, Tim (2018), A Population History of India: From the First Modern People to the Present Day, Oxford University Press, ISBN 978-0-19-882905-8
