= Ethnic groups in Delhi =

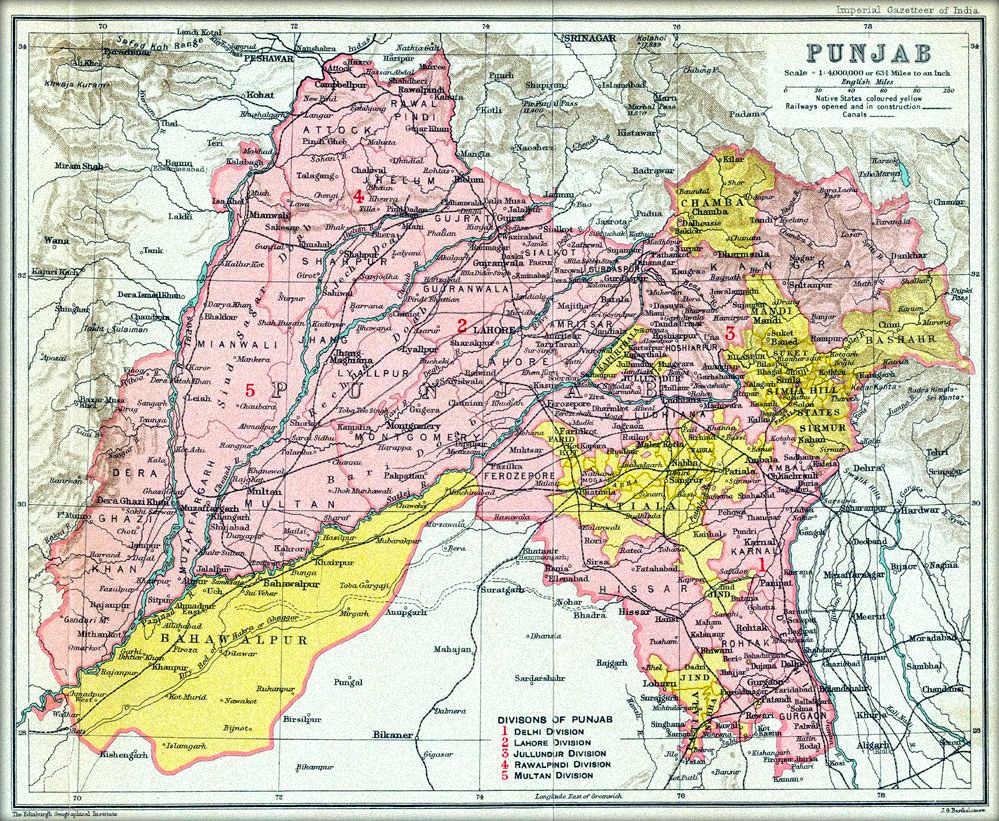
Punjab (British India) in 1909 from The Imperial Gazetteer of India

Delhi's ethnic groups are diverse. The Yamuna river's flood plains provide fertile alluvial soil suitable for agriculture but are prone to recurrent floods. The Yamuna, a sacred river in Hinduism, is the only major river flowing through Delhi. The original natives of Delhi are those whose ancestors lived in the Yamuna basin, a region which spreads radially from the capital up to a distance of approximately 200 kilometres. This province was not ethnically homogeneous and large amounts of Hindi-speakers resided in the southeast, now Haryana, eastern side, now West Uttar Pradesh and in Delhi's Yamuna Basin. Today the migrant population consists largely of Punjabis, Haryanvis, Bengalis, Biharis, Uttar Pradeshis, Rajasthanis and Madhya Pradeshis etc.

During the time of British Raj, Delhi was made a district city of the Punjab Province of British India.

== Caste and politics ==
- According to a 2013 The Hindu article, surveys by the political parties indicate that the dominant voter caste / community groups in Delhi include the Jats (10%), Punjabis (9%), Vaish (8%), Gujjars (7%) and Sikhs (4%).
- A 2013 The Pioneer report estimates Jats to be only 5.5% of the total electorate.
- According to another 2013 The Pioneer report, the Brahmins comprise 12–14% of Delhi's population.
- According to a 2015 India TV article, the major voter social groups include Punjabis (different castes and religions) (35%), Purvanchalis (24%), Muslims (12%), Jats (8%), Vaish (8%), Gujjars (7%), Sikhs (5%) and around 3.5 million Uttarakhandis.
- In the 2015 Legislative Assembly election, 12 out of Delhi's 70 constituencies were reserved for scheduled caste (Dalit) candidates because of dominant Dalit population.
- According to a 2015 report by The Tribune, Delhi has 81% Hindus and 11.7% Muslims. 35% Punjabi population controls 15–20% vote share in at least 20 constituencies. Purvanchalis, as per the report, were at 4 million.
- A 2017 article by the Indian Express reported a total of 1.2 to 1.4 million voters who have roots in Uttarakhand.
- As per 2020 report by ThePrint, Migrants from Uttar Pradesh and Bihar almost dominate Delhi's population. Two out of every three migrants in Delhi were born in either state.
- As per a 2020 India Today report, Purvanchali voters—Delhi residents with roots in eastern Uttar Pradesh, Bihar, and Jharkhand—comprise about 25–30 per cent of the electorate.
- A 2022 article by Times of India, have reported that "People from eastern Uttar Pradesh and Bihar, who comprise Purvanchalis, are believed to be numerically superior to other ethnicities in 16 of the 70 assembly seats in the city, accounting 30% of the population.
- Jats, Punjabi Khatris and Brahmins dominated politics in Delhi for many decades.
- Numerically high, the ethnic Punjabis of all castes are believed to account for at least 35% to 40% of Delhi's total population, and are predominantly Hindi-speaking Punjabi Hindus with a significant minority being Punjabi-speaking Sikhs.
- According to a 2025 report by Financial Express, Delhi has highest percentage of upper-castes of all the union territories of India accounting for 35% to 40% of the total population, of which 13% are Brahmins, 8% Rajputs, 7% Vaish and 5% Punjabi Khatris. 30% belong to the Other Backward Classes (OBCs), with Jats and Gujjars occupying a major chunks followed by castes including Yadavs. At least 16% are Dalits, and approximately 13% are Muslims and 3% Sikhs.

== History ==
=== Medieval ===
==== Early ====
Early Medieval Delhi (8th–12th Century) During the early medieval period, Delhi emerged as a regional power center under the Tomara Rajputs (c. 8th–11th century), who founded Lal Kot, the city's first fortification near Mehrauli. Later, the Chauhans of Ajmer extended their control, with Prithviraj Chauhan (r. 1178–1192 CE) enlarging Lal Kot into Qila Rai Pithora. Delhi became a fortified political base and a symbol of Rajput valor and resistance during this era.

==== Late ====
During the Delhi Sultanate (1206–1526), Delhi served as the imperial capital (Dar-ul-Mulk) and administrative center of the empire, from where the Sultans ruled and controlled all provinces. Under the Mughals (1526–1857), Delhi again became the imperial capital (Dar-ul-Khilafat), especially after Shah Jahan founded Shahjahanabad in 1638, making it the political and symbolic heart of Mughal India.

=== British rule ===
==== Land ownership ====
During the late 19th century, under British colonial administration, land ownership in Delhi District which includes today's Delhi, Sonipat and Ballabgarh was predominantly rural and tied to proprietary rights assessed during settlement operations. The Gazetteer of Delhi District, 1883–84 provides a detailed breakdown of these holdings by caste and tribe, reflecting the agrarian structure where Jaats emerged as the largest proprietors, controlling most of the assessed land. This dominance was concentrated in northern and western villages, while the remaining holdings were distributed among approximately 20 other communities, highlighting the fragmented nature of rural land tenure.

Community/Caste/Tribe	Percentage of Total Land Holdings
Jaats	44.3%
Gujjars	15.1%
Rajputs	9.8%
Muslims(Moguls)	7.3%
Christians (i.e. by Govt)	4.7%
Other Hindus	4.8%
Taga	4.8%
Ahir	3.9%
Gorwah	2.4%
Taga Musalman	2.1%
Saiyid	2.1%
Brahmins	2.0%
Meo	1.8%
Shaikh	1.5%
Pathan	0.7%
Baloch	0.3%
Total	100%

==== Per person land ownership ====
In terms of per person landholdings, the hierarchy differed from total land control. Gujjar held the highest average at 4.1 Acres per person, followed by Jaats with 3.37 Acres and Rajputs with 3.28. Ahirs averaged 2.17 Acres, Balochs 2.03 Acres , Saiyids 1.98 Acres, Meos 1.54 Acres, Brahmins 0.2acres, and Pathans 0.47 Acres , Shaikhs had the lowest average with 0.25 Acres per person.

Community/Caste/Tribe	Acres per person
Gujjar	4.1
Jaats	3.37
Rajput	3.28
Ahir	2.17
Baloch	2.03
Saiyid	1.98
Meo	1.54
Brahmins	0.2
Pathan	0.47
Shaikh	0.25

==== Religion ====
The 1941 Census, conducted during the final years of British colonial rule, offers the last detailed pre-Partition view of Delhi Province's religious demographics. Covering a territory roughly equivalent to the modern National Capital Territory of Delhi, it recorded a total population of 917,939, with Hindus comprising 61.8% and Muslims 33.22%. Urban areas exhibited greater religious diversity than the predominantly Hindu rural hinterland.

Religious composition of Delhi Province (1941 Census)

Religion	Urban Delhi Province		Rural Delhi Province		Total Delhi Province	
Religion	Population	%	Population	%	Population	%
Hinduism	374,968	53.9%	192,296	86.52%	567,264	61.8%
Islam	277,815	39.93%	27,156	12.22%	304,971	33.22%
Christianity	15,593	2.24%	1,882	0.85%	17,475	1.9%
Sikhism	15,787	2.27%	370	0.17%	16,157	1.76%
Jainism	10,770	1.55%	517	0.23%	11,287	1.23%
Zoroastrianism	284	0.04%	0	0%	284	0.03%
Buddhism	150	0.02%	0	0%	150	0.02%
Judaism	52	0.01%	3	0%	55	0.01%
Others	267	0.04%	29	0.01%	296	0.03%
Total population	695,686	100%	222,253	100%	917,939	100%

=== Present ===
==== Impact of Partition on Delhi ====
The Partition of India in 1947 had profound demographic, economic, and spatial effects on Delhi. Following independence, New Delhi continued as the capital of the Dominion of India and, after 1950, of the Republic of India. The city's population nearly doubled between 1941 and 1951—from approximately 920,000 to 1.74 million—driven largely by the arrival of over 500,000 Hindu and Sikh refugees from what is now Pakistan, while roughly two-thirds of Delhi's Muslim residents, concentrated mainly in the old walled city, migrated to Pakistan.

In the decades following Partition, the villages on Delhi's periphery experienced dramatic transformations as agricultural land was acquired for urban expansion. According to the Delhi Development Authority (DDA), metropolitan Delhi has grown largely on lands obtained from these villagers. Many former agrarian households adapted to wage labour, rental income, and non-agricultural livelihoods, reflecting the broader urbanisation of these areas. Physically, these villages transformed from open fields and "abadi" plots into high-density settlements with informal housing, narrow lanes, and piecemeal infrastructure development. The Delhi Land Pooling Policy currently recognises approximately 104 "urban villages" that have required major civic upgrades to integrate fully into the metropolis.

Urbanization intensified in the early 1950s under the Delhi Improvement Trust (established in 1937), which initiated schemes for congestion relief, housing, and urban improvement. However, post-Partition challenges, including land scarcity and rising property prices, limited project completions. The state acquired agricultural land from surrounding villages for refugee rehabilitation and infrastructure expansion, often under ordinances such as the 1955 Delhi Control of Building Operations Act. Private developers also purchased village lands to construct residential colonies, such as those in Hauz Khas during the mid-1950s.

In 1957, the Delhi Development Authority was established. Successive Master Plans converted large tracts of agricultural and village land into residential, commercial, and industrial zones, expanding the city's built-up area from approximately 326 km² in 1961 to 702 km² by 2001.

== Migrants ==
The Indian censuses record the native languages, but not the descent of the citizens. Linguistic data cannot accurately predict ethnicity: for example, many descendants of the Punjabi Hindu and Sikh refugees who came to Delhi following the partition of India now speak Hindi natively. Thus, there is no concrete official data on the ethnic makeup of Delhi. For instance, the 2011 census states that 80.94% of Delhi's population speaks Hindi, but this figure does not accurately reflect the city's ethnic composition. A significant portion of this includes ethnic Punjabis who have shifted from Punjabi to Hindi over generations due to cultural assimilation, education, and social integration. While Punjabis make up 35–40% of Delhi's population, only 5.2% reported Punjabi as their mother tongue, meaning the rest have switched to Hindi. When excluding these linguistic converts, the actual native Hindi-speaking population drops to around 46–51%, rather than the reported 80.94%. Among the actual native Hindi-speaking population, around 30% consists of Purvanchalis (people from eastern Uttar Pradesh and Bihar). The remaining 16–21% is likely composed of migrants from other Hindi-speaking states, such as Madhya Pradesh, Chhattisgarh, Rajasthan, Uttarakhand, Haryana, Jharkhand, and Himachal Pradesh, although specific census data or direct sources for this group are not available. This is further evident in West Delhi, where Hindi is reported as the first language of 75.46% of the population, while Punjabi is spoken by only 14.52%, despite ethnic Punjabis making up an estimated 60% of the district's population. This highlights how census language data can be misleading, as it does not differentiate between native speakers and those who have adopted Hindi over time, reshaping Delhi's linguistic identity.

Delhi is an ancient city, and the people residing in the Yamuna River basin were the original natives of the city. However, being a historical capital and prominent city, Delhi has always attracted a large number of immigrants. When the capital of British India was shifted from Calcutta to Delhi, a substantial number of government personnel, especially from the Bengal, migrated to Delhi. Before 1947, Delhi was primarily a city dominated by Urdu-speaking Muslims, Hindu Rajputs and the Baniyas. The surrounding pastoral and agricultural areas inside Delhi's rural areas and outside were inhabited mainly by Jats, Gurjars, Ahirs (Yadavs), Rajputs, and other local communities.

Following the partition of India in 1947, a large number of people migrated to Delhi. In a few months, its demography changed. Punjabi (including Hindkowan and Saraiki) migrants and refugees, who arrived in hordes from West Punjab and North-West Frontier Province after the Partition, suddenly came to form nearly one-third of the city's population. The large number of Punjabis (with a relatively small number of Sindhis and Bengalis), led to the characterisation of city as a multi-cultural, multi-ethnic with a significant Punjabi population. Delhi was an absolute de facto Punjabi-speaking majority city from 1947 to till late 1980s. South East Delhi's Chittaranjan Park locality hosts the largest Bengali population in the city, the majority of its residents have settled here just after Partition. According to the census, the Bengali population in Delhi is estimated at 2.16 lakh, and the Chittaranjan Park area has a total population of 78 thousand. According to the first census following partition and independence, conducted in 1951, Delhi had a total population of 1,744,072 people, of which 1,026,762 persons (58.9 per cent) were born outside the city, comprising immigrants, migrants, or refugees, while the remaining 717,310 persons (41.1 per cent) were born in the city.

Place of birth of Delhiites in 1951
Place of birth	1951 census	
Place of birth	Population	Percentage
Delhi	717,310	41.13%
Pakistan (mainly West Punjab and North-West Frontier Province)	479,744	27.51%
Uttar Pradesh (including contemporary Uttarakhand)	262,098	15.03%
East Punjab (including contemporary Chandigarh, Haryana, Himachal Pradesh, and Punjab)	190,586	10.93%
Rajasthan	48,592	2.79%
Bombay	8,956	0.51%
Madhya Pradesh	8,082	0.46%
West Bengal	5,675	0.33%
Kashmir	4,444	0.25%
Madras	3,920	0.22%
Madhya Bharat	1,914	0.11%
Hyderabad	1,870	0.11%
Travancore Cochin	1,695	0.1%
Ajmer	1,499	0.09%
Bihar	1,303	0.07%
Nepal	1,073	0.06%
Ireland	1,010	0.06%
Malaya	855	0.05%
Assam	674	0.04%
Burma	635	0.04%
Saurashtra	575	0.03%
Mysore	492	0.03%
Kutch	266	0.02%
Bhopal	211	0.01%
Africa	115	0.01%
Orissa	83	0.005%
China	69	0.004%
Tripura	34	0.002%
Ceylon	20	0.001%
Russia	18	0.001%
Afghanistan	16	0.001%
Vindhya Pradesh	3	0%
Other places	235	0.01%
Total population	1,744,072	100%

By 1991, the number of those born outside Delhi was 3.7 million (out of a total population of 9.4 million). Most of these included immigrants from Uttar Pradesh (1.75 million) and Rajasthan (0.23 million). However, these neighbouring states are themselves ethnically diverse, so it is hard to use this data for determining the ethnic make-up of Delhi. There are also a large number of immigrants from the East Indian states of Bihar, Jharkhand, Orissa and Bengal. The number of South Indians is relatively less, with most of them coming from Kerala and Tamil Nadu. There are also several immigrants from the North-East India, who have migrated to Delhi because of the conflicts and bad economy in their native states.

The number of Afghan Indians, as well as Afghan students, workers and refugees, living in the neighbourhood of Lajpat Nagar has resulted in it being referred to as Afghan Nagar. The suburb has two Afghan "bakeries and three restaurants, and many guesthouses and apartments housing Afghan students, guests, medical refugees and asylum seekers." As such, Apollo Hospital in Delhi "has translators on staff, a website in Dari, and even a separate payment desk for Afghans." Most of the Afghans in Lajpat Nagar speak Pashto or Dari.

Today Hindi-Urdu and Punjabi are still the most widely spoken languages in Delhi and have become the lingua franca. English is the principal written language of the city and the most commonly used language in government work and in Delhi's huge financial sector. In addition to Hindi, Punjabi and English, Urdu also has official language status in Delhi.
