= Hanumanpur =

Hanumanpur may refer to:

- Hanumanpur, Gujarat, India
- Hanumanpur, Orissa, India
- Hanumanpur, Rajasthan, India
