= 9th Jat Regiment =

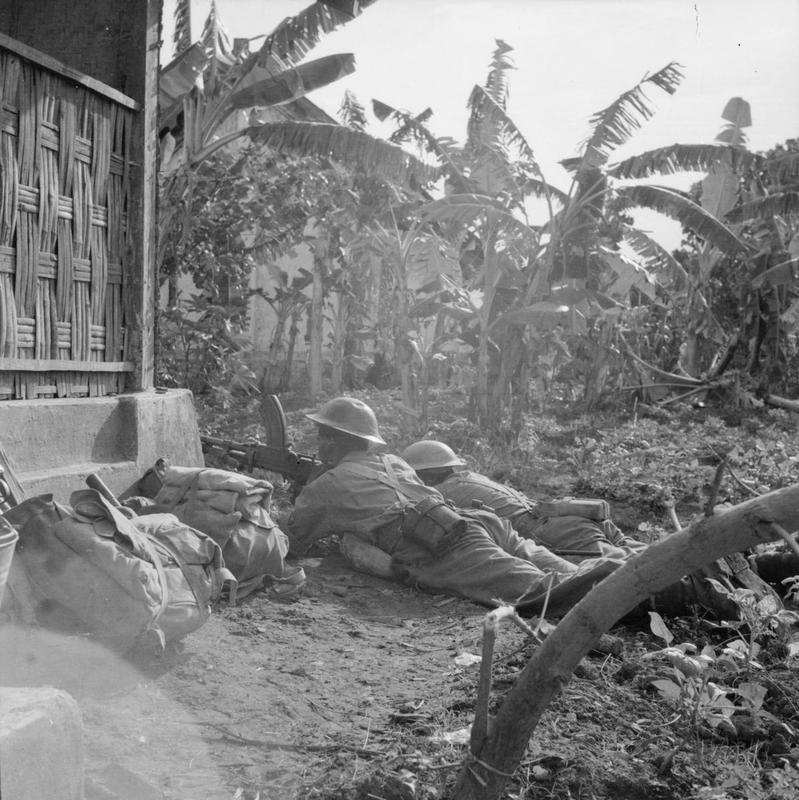
- Bren gunners of the 3/9th Jats in action against Indonesian nationalists in Surabaya, Java.
- Active: 1922–1947
- Country: British India
- Branch: Army
- Type: Infantry
- Engagements: World War II

The 9th Jat Regiment was an infantry regiment of the British Indian Army. It was formed in 1795 and again in 1922, after the Indian government reformed the army, moving from single battalion regiments to multi battalion regiments.

== World War II ==
The Regiment saw a great deal of fighting with the Jats showing their mettle in North Africa, Ethiopia, Burma, Malaya, Singapore, and Java-Sumatra. A large number of gallantry awards were won including a Victoria Cross (by Jemadar Abdul Hafiz) and two George Crosses (by Islam-ud-Din and Abdul Rahman). At the end of the war the Regiment, in company with other regiments of the Indian Infantry, dropped the numeral 9 from its title and became simply the Jat Regiment. After independence it was allocated to the new Indian Army. The Regiment at independence had about 1/4th or 25% Muslims recruited from Panwar Rajput Muslims from around Rohtak and Hisar, Haryana and from Muslim Jats in Montgomery and Okara in West Punjab, in all-Muslim companies of the 10th Jats and 6th Jat Light Infantry. The Muslim companies and platoons were merged into the Bahawalpur Regiment and the 130th Baluchis as the families of the soldiers moved to Pakistan upon partition. They were replaced by Hindu Jat and Tarkhan soldiers from Bahawalnagar and Minchinabad serving in 127th Baluch Light Infantry and widened recruitment of Haryana Gujjars and Ahirs from around Rohtak and Gurgaon.

== Formation ==
- 1st Battalion ex 6th Jat Light Infantry
- 2nd Battalion ex 119th Infantry (The Mooltan Regiment)
- 3rd Battalion ex 10th Jats
- 4th Battalion ex 18th Infantry
- 10th (Training) Battalion ex 2nd Battalion, 6th Jat Light Infantry

=== Formed in World War II ===
- 7th Battalion
- 8th Battalion
- 9th Battalion
- 14th Battalion
- 15th Battalion

== See also ==
- Jat people
- Jat Regiment
- List of Jats
- Jat Mahasabha
- World Jat Aryan Foundation
- Dev Samhita
- Origin of Jat people from Shiva's Locks
- Jat reservation agitation
- 20th Lancers
- 10th Jats
- 14th Murray's Jat Lancers
- 6th Jat Light Infantry

== Sources ==
- Sharma, Gautam (1990). Valour and sacrifice: famous regiments of the Indian Army. Allied Publishers. ISBN 81-7023-140-X.
