= 6th Jat Light Infantry =

Akhil Chaitanya
- Active: 1997
- Country: India
- Branch: Engineer

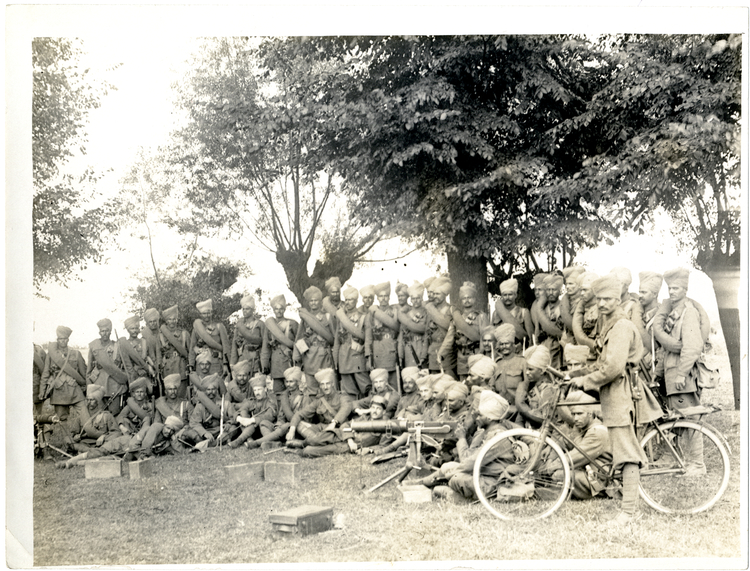

The 6th Jat Light Infantry were an infantry regiment of the Bengal Army, later of the united British Indian Army. They could trace their origins to 1803, when they were the 1st Battalion, 22nd Bengal Native Infantry. Over the years they were known by a number of different names the 43rd Bengal Native Infantry 1824–1842, the 43rd Bengal Native (Light) Infantry 1842–1861, the 6th Bengal Native (Light) Infantry 1861– after the Kitchener reforms of the Indian Army the 6th Jat Bengal (Light) Infantry. The regiment was involved in the First Anglo-Afghan War, the First Anglo-Sikh War, the Second Anglo-Afghan War, the Boxer Rebellion and World War I. After World War I the Indian Government reformed the army moving from single battalion regiments to multi battalion regiments. The 6th Jat Light Infantry became the new 1st Battalion, 9th Jat Regiment. After India gained independence they were one of the regiments allocated to the Indian Army.

== See also ==
- Jat people
- Jat Regiment
- List of Jats
- Jat Mahasabha
- World Jat Aryan Foundation
- Dev Samhita
- Origin of Jat people from Shiva's Locks
- Jat reservation agitation
- 20th Lancers
- 10th Jats
- 14th Murray's Jat Lancers
- 9th Jat Regiment
