= 10th Jats =

- Active: 1823-1922
- Country: Indian Empire
- Branch: Army
- Type: Infantry
- Part of: Bengal Army (to 1895); Bengal Command
- Uniform: Red; faced yellow
- Engagements: 1858 - 59 China; 1885-87 Burma

Commanders
- Colonel-in-Chief: Edward VII (1904)

The 10th Jats were an infantry regiment of the British Indian Army. They could trace their origins to 1823, when they were known as the 1st Battalion, 33rd Bengal Native Infantry. Over the years they became known by a number of different titles. The 65th Bengal Native Infantry 1824–1861, the 10th Bengal Native Infantry 1861–1885, the 10th Bengal Infantry 1885–1897, the 10th Jat Bengal Infantry 1897–1901, the 10th Jat Infantry 1901–1903 and finally in 1903 the 10th Jats.

During this time the regiment served in China in the Second Opium War and the Third Anglo-Burmese War. During World War I they were in the 55th Indian Brigade, 18th Indian Division and served in the Mesopotamia Campaign.

The 65th BNI was one of two Bengal Native Infantry regiments which had accepted active service in China in 1857. Accordingly, both had escaped involvement in the Great Indian Mutiny of that year and were amongst the twelve "old" regiments of the East India Company's Bengal Army to survive into the new Indian Army.

After World War I the Indian government reformed the army again moving from single battalion regiments to multi battalion regiments. The 10th Jats now became the 3rd Battalion 9th Jats.

== See also ==
- Jat people
- Jat Regiment
- List of Jats
- Jat Mahasabha
- World Jat Aryan Foundation
- Dev Samhita
- Origin of Jat people from Shiva's Locks
- Jat reservation agitation
- 20th Lancers
- 14th Murray's Jat Lancers
- 9th Jat Regiment
- 6th Jat Light Infantry

== Sources ==
- Barthorp, Michael; Burn, Jeffrey (1979). Indian infantry regiments 1860-1914. Osprey Publishing. ISBN 0-85045-307-0.
- Sumner, Ian (2001). The Indian Army 1914-1947. Osprey Publishing. ISBN 1-84176-196-6.
