= Jat Mahasabha =

Jat community organisation

Akhil Bharatiya Jat Mahasabha
- Abbreviation: ABJM
- Founders: Chaudhary Mamraj Singh Shamli (Muzaffarnagar), Kunwar Kalyan Singh Varkatpur (Bulandshahr), Thakur Tej Singh Vahpur (Bulandshahr), Chaudhari Hari Singh Kurmali (Muzaffarnagar), Shri Ram Lal Hala Raghunathpur (Badayun), Shri Nathu Singh Pardeshi, Kunwar Hukum Singh Angai (Mathura), Shri Lal Singh and Shri Vahal Singh (Saidpur), Chaudhary Gulab Singh Yadnagar, Chaudhary Nanu Singh Delhi, Shri Shadi Ram editor 'Kshatriya'; Sir Chhotu Ram (Rohtak).
- Headquarters: 39, Ber Sarai, Hauz Khas, New Delhi
- Website: https://www.jatmahasabhaglobal.com/hi

Akhil Bhartiya Jat Mahasabha is a non-political and non-profit organisation of Jats in India. The organisation was created to raise awareness about the social and economic problems faced by peoples of the Jat community. The Jat Mahasabha spearheaded the community's struggle for reservation in the run-up to the Lok Sabha elections in 1999. Sardar Dara Singh was the president, followed by patron Chaudhary Ajay Singh (Former High Commissioner to Fiji).

According to Nonica Datta, Jat Mahasabha was Arya Samaj's offshoot founded in 1905 in Muzaffarnagar. But Brij Kishore Sharma states that the claims of Datta are incorrect. According to him, it was founded in 1907, and that there are two claims regarding its place of formation. He notes that some sources support the Muzaffarnagar claim, but the Chhatri Jat journal states that it was founded at a fair in Garhmukteshwar, Uttar Pradesh.

The Mahasabha, a supra-provincial organisation, was perceived in southeast Punjab as a symbol of unity in Jat society and as the main catalyst of reform and change. The Jat Mahasabha is a nonpolitical, social organisation in nature. It is organised for the purpose of social reconstruction. Although the Jat Mahasabha has been functioning from 1993 for social causes, it is not a registered body, not even as an NGO or social organisation.

Sir Chhotu Ram was awarded the title of 'Rao Bahadur', and in 1923, he founded the Unionist Party or the 'Zamindar Association' to protect the interests of farmers.

Governor Malcolm Hailey addressed the Jat Mahasabha in 1930.

== See also ==
- Khap
- Bhangi Misl of Dhillon Jats
- Misl concept of Punjab similar to khap system
- Sukerchakia Misl of Maharaja Ranjit Singh
- Dahiya Khap
- Jat Gazette
- Jat people
- Jat Regiment
- List of Jats
- World Jat Aryan Foundation
- Dev Samhita
- Jat reservation agitation
- 20th Lancers
- 10th Jats
- 14th Murray's Jat Lancers
- 9th Jat Regiment
- 6th Jat Light Infantry
