= Harlal Singh =

Indian Activist and Politician (1901-1982)

Sardar Harlal Singh
- Born: February 3, 1901; Mandawa, Rajasthan
- Died: March 21, 1982 (aged 81); Rajasthan
- Other name: Sher -e- Shekhawati
- Occupations: Political activist, freedom fighter, social worker
- Known for: Leadership in the farmers' movement in colonial India
- Political party: Indian National Congress
- Spouse: Smt. Kishori Devi

Sardar Harlal Singh Dular (3 February 1901 – 21 March 1982) was a freedom fighter, social worker, and politician from Rajasthan, known for his significant contributions to the Shekhawati farmers movement and the abolition of the Jagirdari system. He was elected to the Rajasthan Legislative Assembly from Chirawa, Jhunjhunu in 1952. He was a member of the Indian National Congress.

== Early life ==
Singh was born into the Dular Jat family on 3 February 1901 in the village of Hanumanpura near Mandawa in the Jhunjhunu district of Rajasthan. His family was deeply committed to the Indian freedom movement.

== Career ==
=== Contribution to Freedom Movement ===
Singh played a pivotal role in the Shekhawati farmers' movement, which aimed at the abolition of the Jagirdari system. He faced eviction from his agricultural land and residence by the Jagirdars due to his active participation in the movement. Despite numerous false cases lodged against him and an attack in 1946, he remained undeterred.

=== Political career ===
In 1952, Singh was elected as an MLA for Chirawa from the Indian National Congress. He also served as the President of the Rajasthan Pradesh Congress Committee, contributing significantly to the political landscape of Rajasthan.

=== Role in Jat Politics ===
Described by Richard Sisson as "the single most important Jat leader in Shekhawati," Harlal Singh was a prominent campaigner in the farmers' movement of colonial India. Recruited to politics by the Jat Mahasabha, he was an active member from 1925 to 1929. During his tenure, he witnessed growing concerns that the Mahasabha, established by the British Raj, was being used to pacify the Jat community, affirming their societal position while preventing substantial change.

=== Praja Mandal Movement ===
During the 1940s, Harlal Singh Dular served as the president of the Praja Mandal, an urban-based political protest movement. This movement was a significant part of the broader struggle for Indian independence and sought to address the concerns of both urban and agrarian communities. As president, Singh was a crucial conduit between these communities, advocating for their collective interests and independence from British rule.

The Praja Mandal movement was instrumental in mobilizing the masses against the princely states' autocratic rule and the British Raj. It demanded civil and political rights, tax reduction, the abolition of forced labor (begar), and the establishment of a responsible government. Under Singh's leadership, the movement gained momentum in Rajasthan, particularly in the former princely state of Jaipur, where he later organized the Rajasthan Pradesh Congress Committee's activities post-independence.

Singh's role in the Praja Mandal highlighted his ability to bridge the gap between different societal segments, uniting them under the common cause of freedom and reform. His efforts were not only pivotal in the fight against colonialism but also laid the groundwork for democratic governance in the region.
