= List of Jats =

Notable members of the Jat community

This is a list of notable members of the Jat community.

== Anti-colonialists ==
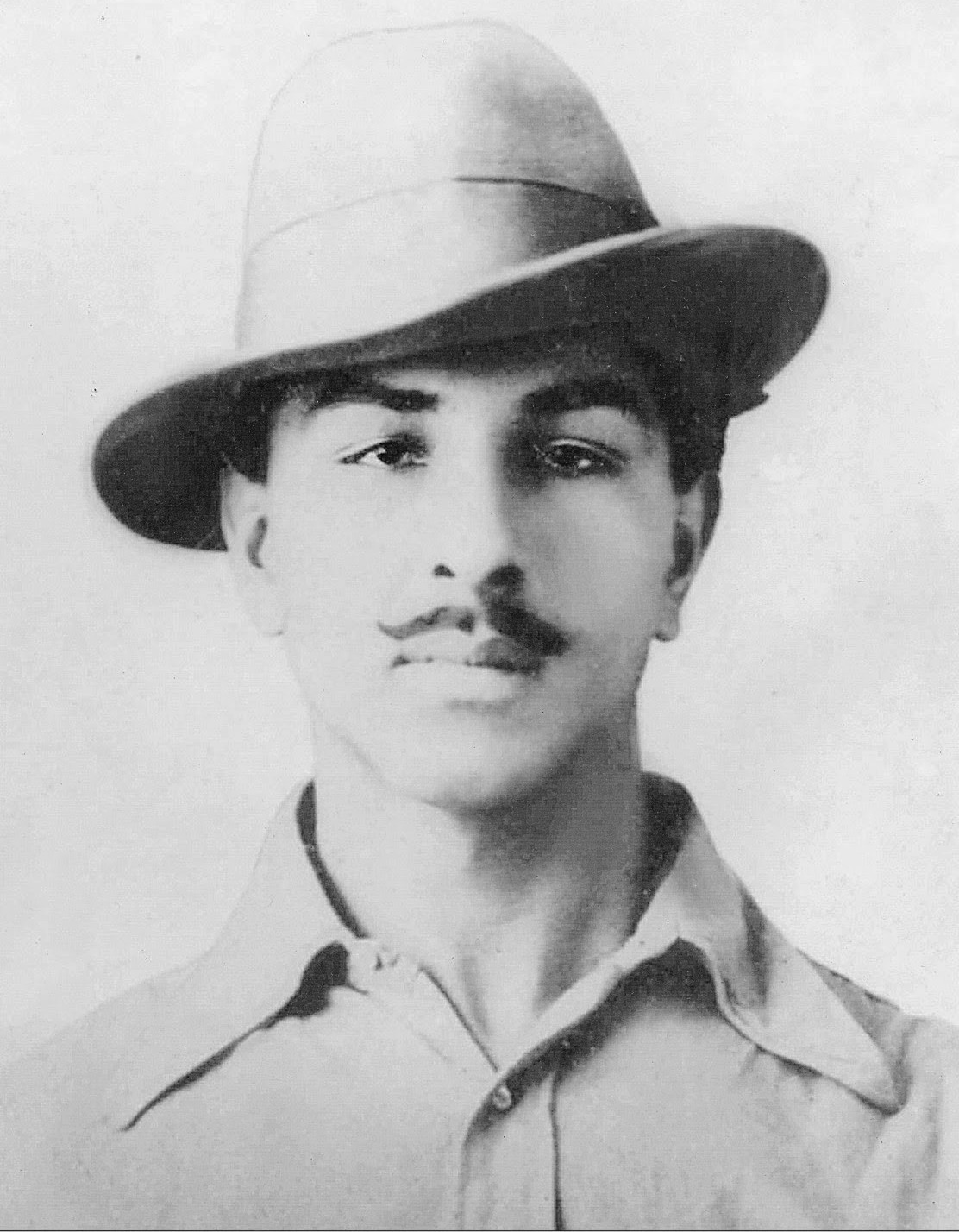
Bhagat Singh, Indian revolutionary who became a symbol of resistance against British colonial rule.

List of notable Jats who were Indian independence activists or freedom fighters

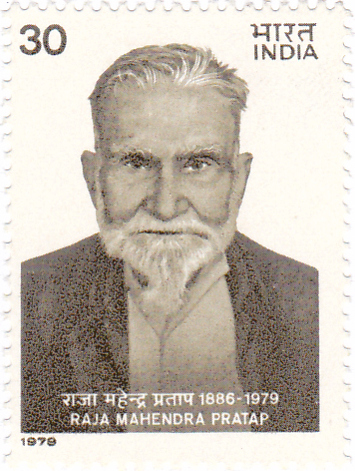
Raja Mahendra Pratap Singh, president of the Provisional Government of India in Kabul

- Baba Gurdit Singh, leader of the Komagata Maru incident
- Bhagat Singh, Indian socialist revolutionary who was executed by the British colonialists in 1931
- Gurbaksh Singh Dhillon, he was as a close associate of Subhas Chandra Bose and played a key role in INA military operations against British forces during World War II
- Kartar Singh Sarabha, Indian freedom fighter
- Nahar Singh, ruler of Ballabgarh who fought against the East India Company in the Indian Rebellion of 1857
- Rai Ahmad Khan Kharal, freedom fighter in the Indian Rebellion of 1857
- Raja Mahendra Pratap Singh, Indian freedom fighter, president of the Provisional Government of India in Kabul
- Sah Mal, rebel who fought against the British in Indian Rebellion of 1857
- Sardar Ajit Singh, revolutionary and uncle of Bhagat Singh, best known for leading the Pagri Sambhal Jatta movement against British agrarian laws and for his lifelong struggle in exile against colonial rule.
- Sohan Singh Bhakna, founding president of the Ghadar party
- Teja Singh Sutantar, freedom fighter and a member of Ghadar Party

== Armed forces ==
=== Indian armed forces ===
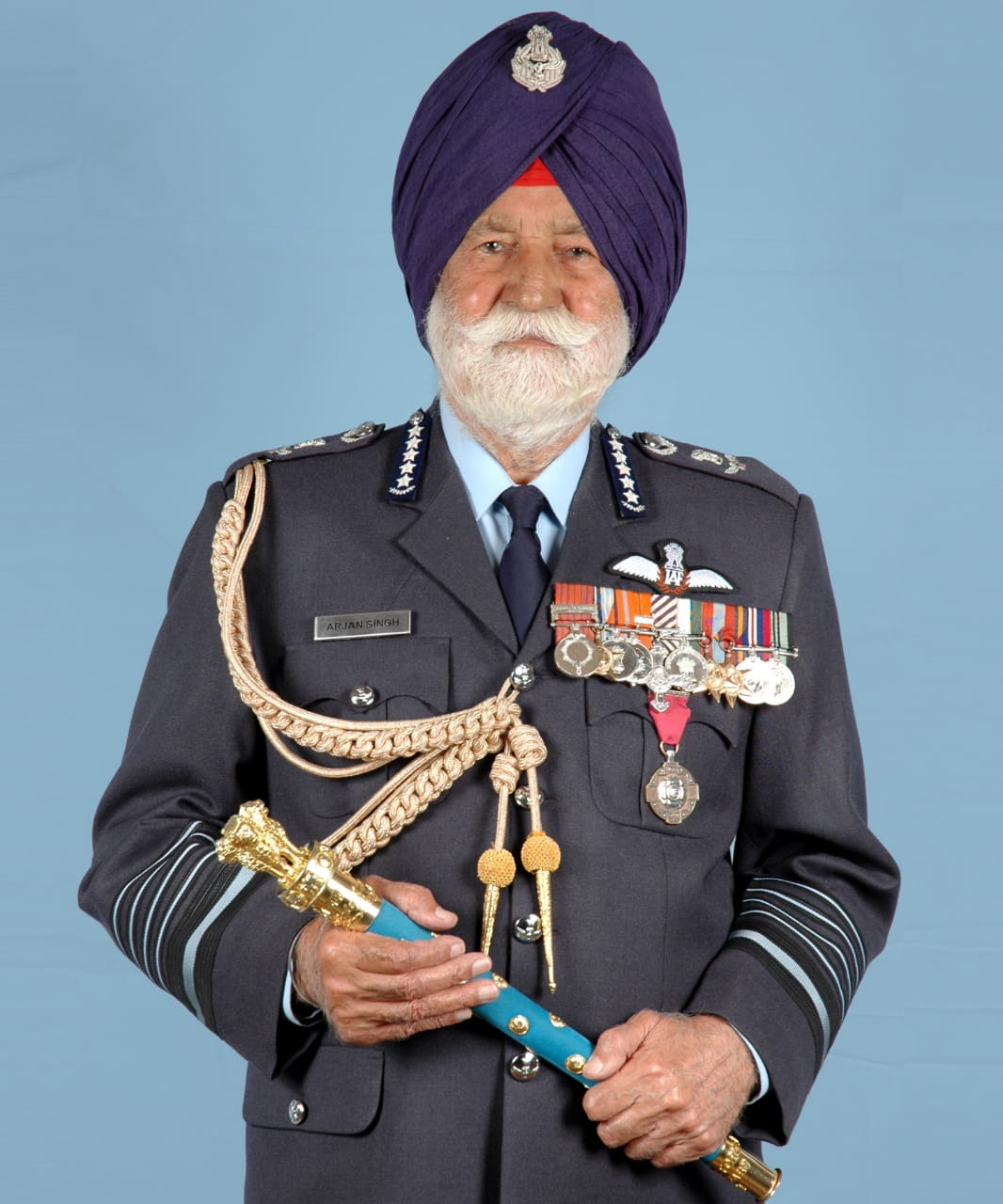
Arjan Singh, 3rd Chief of the Air Staff from 1964 to 1969, leading the Air Force through the Indo-Pakistani War of 1965.

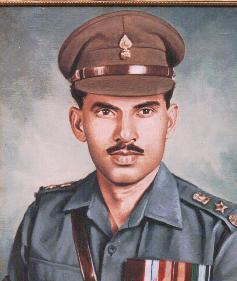
Hoshiar Singh Dahiya, recipient of India's highest military honour, the Param Vir Chakra, for his gallantry during the Indo-Pakistani war of 1971.

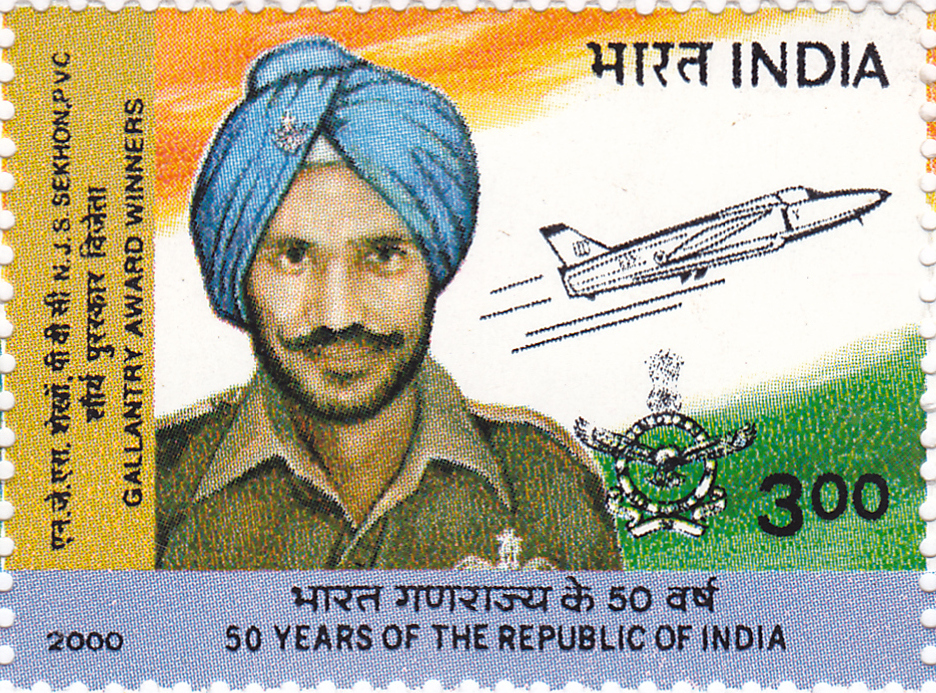
Nirmal Jit Singh Sekhon, recipient of Param Vir Chakra, in recognition of his lone defence of Srinagar Air Base against a Pakistan Air Force(PAF) air raid during the Indo-Pakistani War of 1971.

- Arjan Singh, former Chief of the Indian Air Force
- Badlu Singh, recipient of Victoria Cross
- Chhelu Ram, recipient of Victoria Cross
- Gian Singh, recipient of Victoria Cross
- Lt Gen Harbaksh Singh, recipient of The Vir Chakra and The Padma Vibhushan
- Hoshiar Singh Dahiya, recipient of Param Vir Chakra
- Lt Gen Khem Karan Singh, recipient of Mahavir Chakra
- Mohan Singh, founder and General of the First Indian National Army
- Nirmal Jit Singh Sekhon, recipient of Param Vir Chakra
- Parkash Singh, recipient of Victoria Cross
- Ranjit Singh Dyal, recipient of Maha Vir Chakra
- Richhpal Ram, recipient of Victoria Cross
- Sant Singh, recipient of Mahavir Chakra
- Shabeg Singh, known for his involvement in the training of Mukti Bahini volunteers during the Bangladesh Liberation War
- Ved Prakash Malik, 19th Chief of Army Staff of the Indian Army (Note: Gen. Malik confirms after being congratulated for being a 'Jat' by a twitter account)

=== Pakistani armed forces ===
- Amir Sultan Tarar, the "Colonel Imam", SSG officer, ISI agent, trained Afghan Mujahideen and Taliban fighters
- Qamar Javed Bajwa, 10th Chief of Army Staff of the Pakistani Armed Forces
- Zaheer Ahmad Babar Sidhu, 16th Chief of Air Staff of the Pakistani Air Force

== Businessmen and philanthropists ==
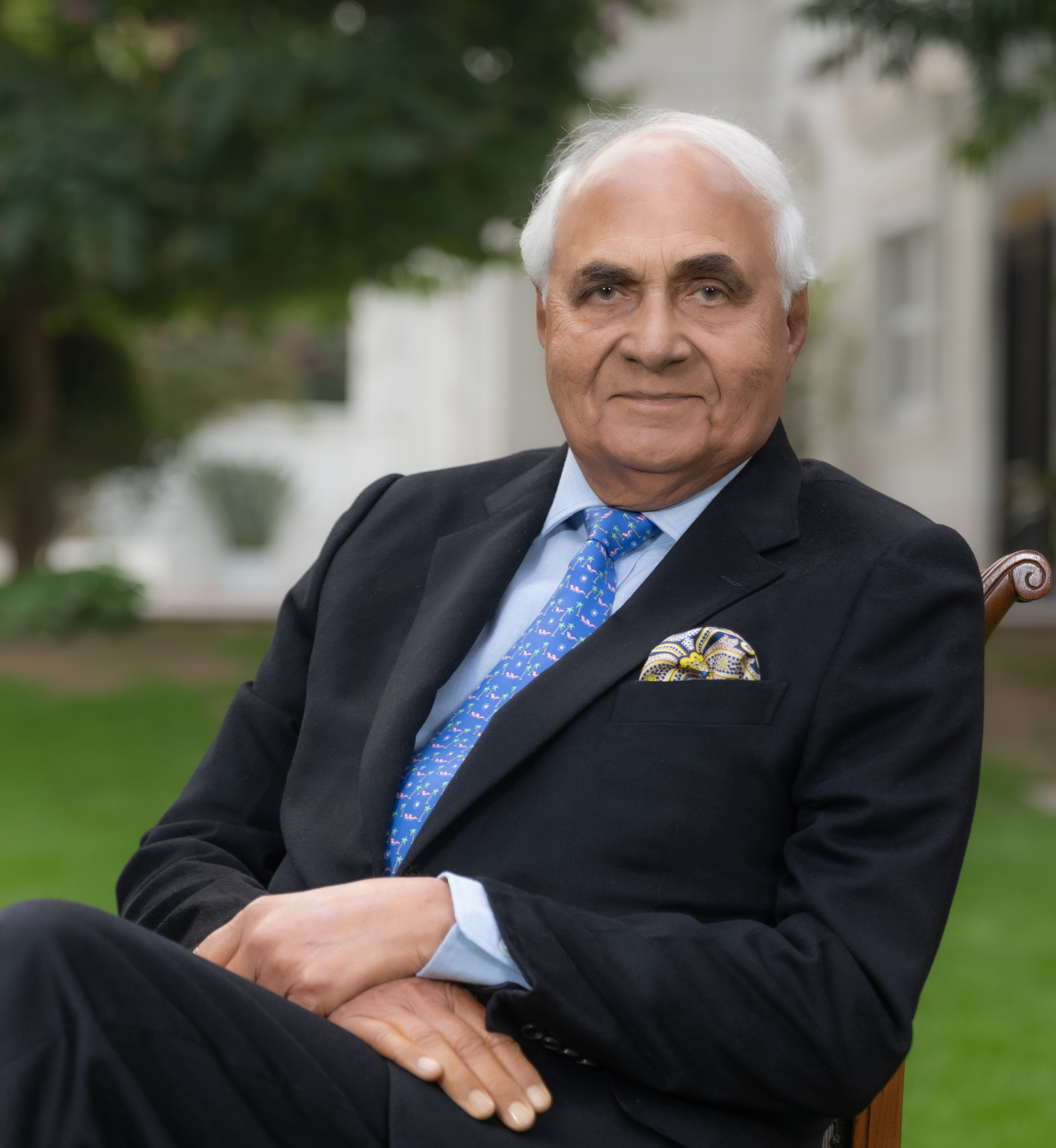
Kushal Pal Singh, Indian billionaire real estate developer

- Chaudhary Raghvendra Singh, Indian real estate developer and founder of DLF.
- Dyal Singh Majithia, philanthropist and founder of The Tribune and Punjab National Bank
- Kushal Pal Singh, Indian billionaire real estate developer and retired military officer.
- Seth Chhaju Ram, Philanthropist

== Civil servants ==
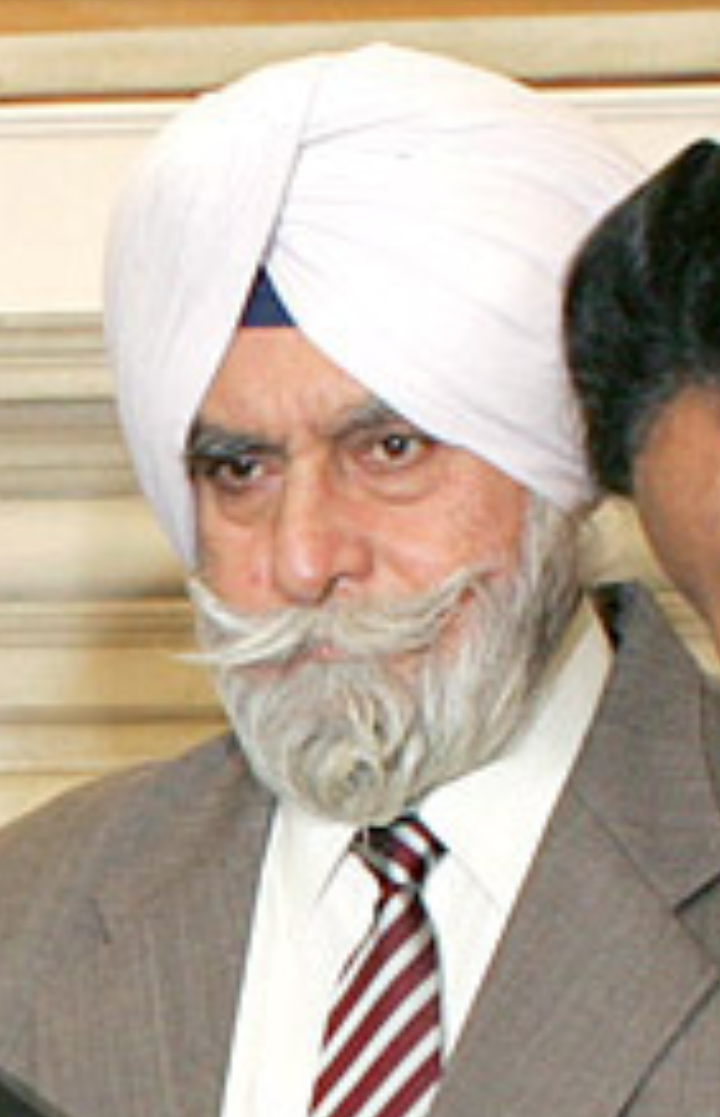
Kanwar Pal Singh Gill, he is credited with having brought the Punjab insurgency under control

- Ajay Singh Chahar, former High Commissioner to Fiji Islands, and former Member of Parliament in the Lok Sabha
- Gyan Prakash Pilania, former DGP of Rajasthan and former Member of the Rajya Sabha
- Kanwar Pal Singh Gill, former two term DGP of Punjab and recipient of Padma Shri
- M. S. Gill, former Indian Administrative Service officer who served as the Mnister of Sports and Youth Affairs and the Minister of Statistics and Programme Implementation. He also served as the Chief Election Commissioner of India.

== Film, television, and entertainment ==
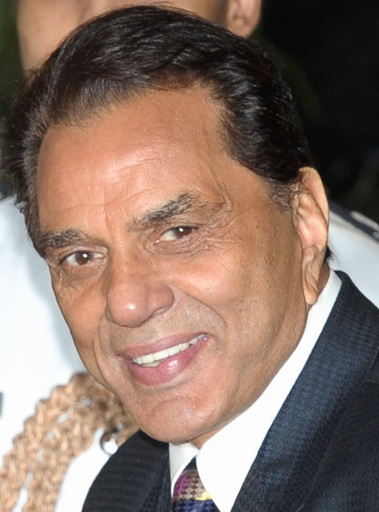
Dharmendra, He-Man of Bollywood

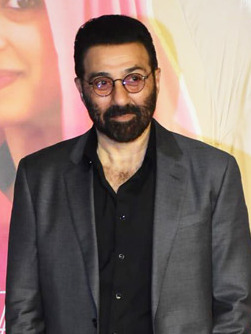
Sunny Deol, known for his angry action hero persona in Hindi cinema

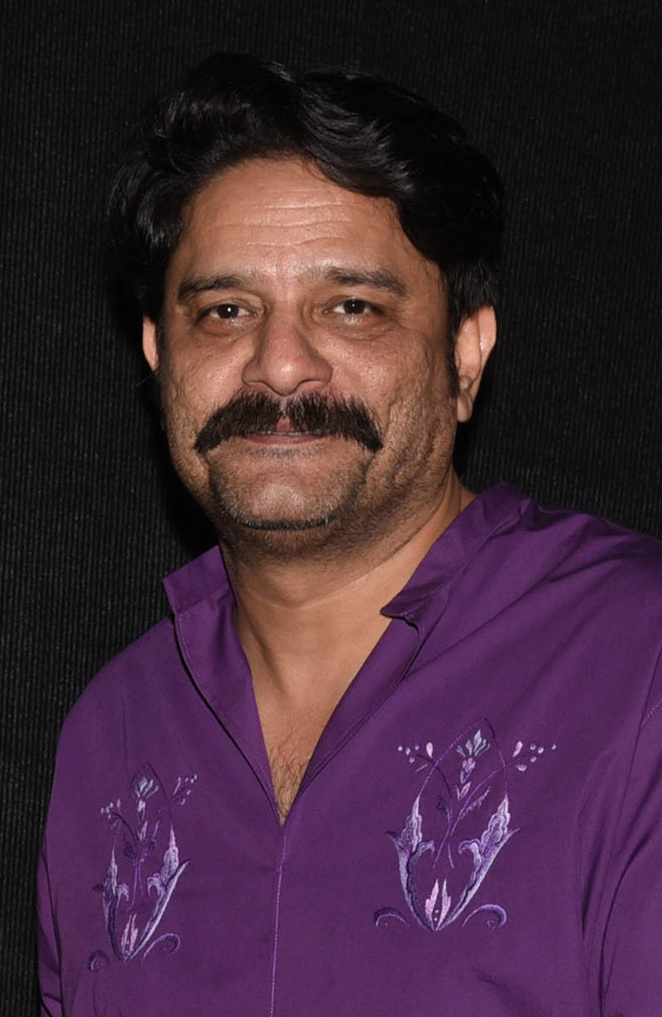
Jaideep Ahlawat, Indian actor

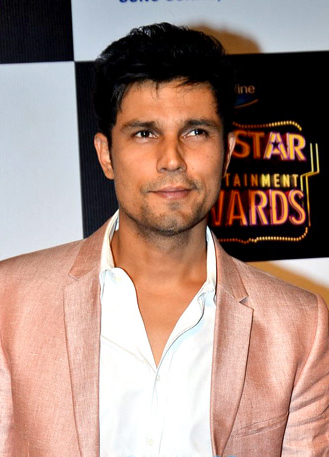
Randeep Hooda, Indian actor

=== Film ===
- Arjan Bajwa, Indian film actor
- Darshan Kumar, Indian film actor
- Dharmendra, Indian film actor
- Jaideep Ahlawat, Indian actor
- Kabir Duhan Singh Indian film actor
- Kirron Kher, Indian film actress
- Mahie Gill, Indian film actress
- Mallika Sherawat, Indian film actress
- Mohit Ahlawat, Indian film actor
- Parvin Dabas, Indian film actor
- Randeep Hooda, Indian film actor
- Simran Mundi, Indian film actress
- Sunny Deol, Indian film actor
- Sushant Singh, Indian film actor
- Taapsee Pannu, Indian film actress

=== Television ===
- Meghna Malik, Indian TV actress
- Rajat Tokas, Indian TV actor
- Vivek Dahiya, Indian TV actor

=== Entertainment ===
- Anubhav Singh Bassi Indian comedian
- Dhruv Rathee Indian YouTuber

== Folklores ==
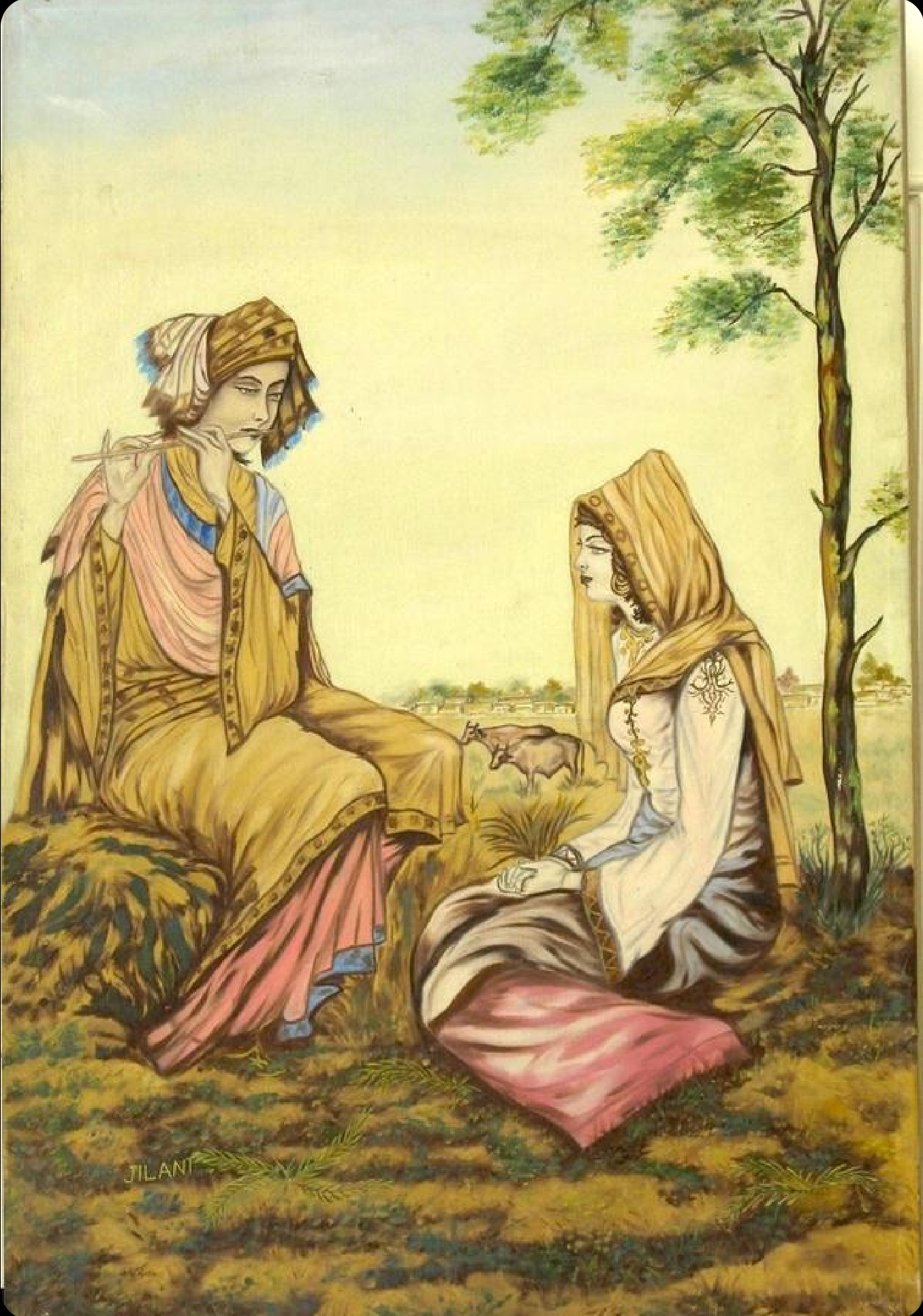
Painting by Shafqat Jilani (c. 1930) depicting Ranjha (playing his flute) and Heer

- Heer Ranjha, a tragic romance in Punjabi literature, popularised in the 18th century by the poet Waris Shah
- Mirza Sahiban, a classic Punjabi folk romance, originally recorded in literary form by the 17th-century poet Pilu

== Historical figures ==
=== Hindu Jats ===
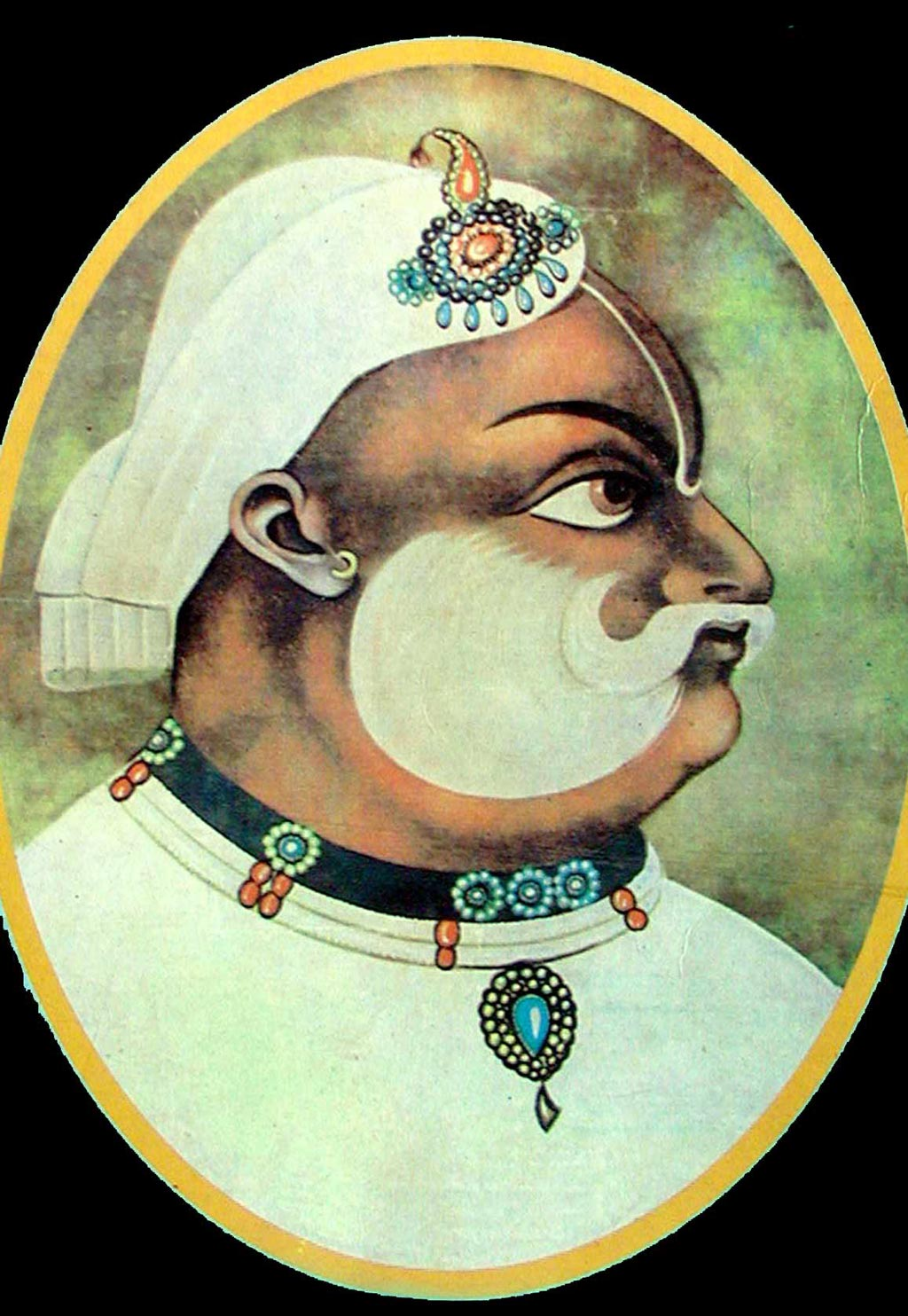
Suraj Mal, Maharaja of Bharatpur Kingdom

List of notable Jats in the history of pre-independence India

- Badan Singh, founder and first Maharaja of Bharatpur
- Churaman, chieftain of Sinsini, Rajasthan. He established the rule mainly centred at Bharatpur, during the decline of the Mughal Empire
- Gokula Jat, rebel leader, who led one of the earliest organised revolts against the Mughal Empire during Aurangzeb reign in 1669
- Jawahar Singh, Maharaja of Bharatpur. Notable for capturing Delhi in 1764 and resistance against Ahmed Shah Abdali
- Kushal Singh Dahiya, sacrificed himself to protect the honour of Sikh Guru Tegh Bahadur
- Raja Maldeo, ruler of Sidhmukh State
- Rajaram Jat, rebel leader and successor of Gokula, who continued resistance against Mughal rule in the late 17th century. Notable for desecration of Akbar tomb
- Ranjit Singh, Maharaja of Bharatpur. He participated in the Second Anglo-Maratha War on the side of the Marathas and his forces proved to be a tough match for Lord Lake
- Suraj Mal, Maharaja of Bharatpur. He is notably remembered for the plunder of Old Delhi in 1753 and the capture of Agra in 1761. He earned the epithet “Plato of the Jats.”

=== Sikh Jats ===
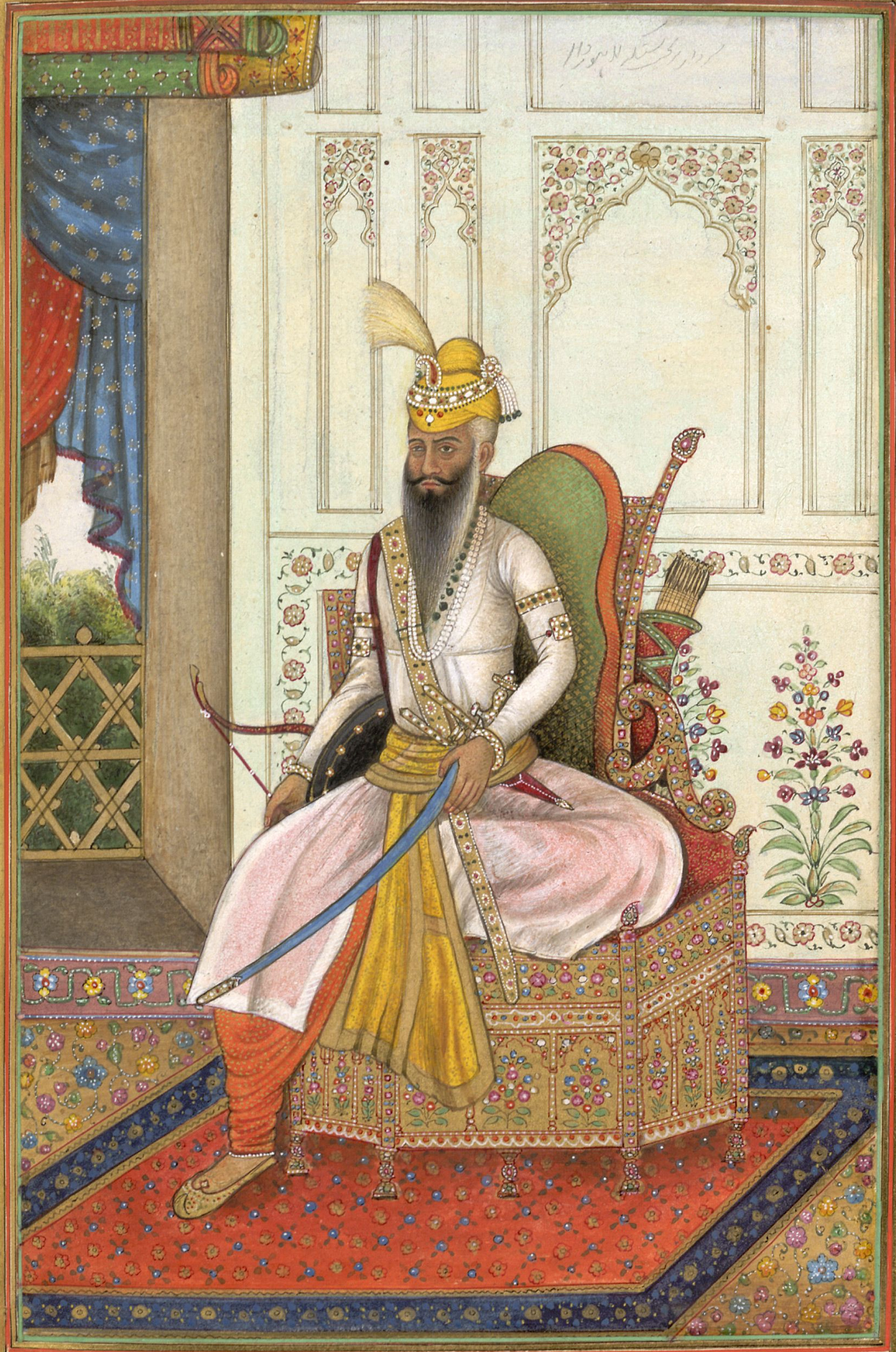
Maharaja Ranjit Singh, founder of Sikh Empire and popularly known as Lion of Punjab

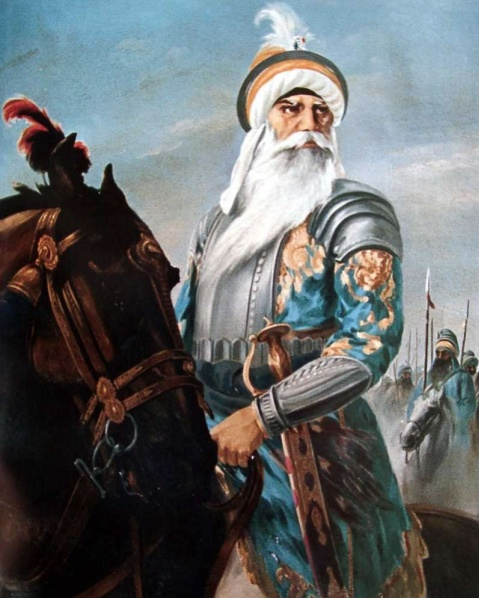
Nawab Kapur Singh, Sikh leader and organiser of the Dal Khalsa

- Akali Phula Singh, Sikh warrior and a Nihang leader
- Baba Deep Singh, founder of Shaheedan Misl
- Baghel Singh, ruler of Singh Krora Misl
- Bhuma Singh Dhillon, chieftain of Bhangi Misl
- Charat Singh, founder of Sukerchakia Misl
- Chhajja Singh Dhillon, founder and chieftain of Bhangi Misl
- Ganda Singh Dhillon, chieftain of Bhangi Misl
- Gujjar Singh Banghi, a Sikh warrior and one of the triumvirates who ruled over Lahore prior to the leadership of Maharaja Ranjit Singh
- Hari Singh Dhillon, ruler of Bhangi Misl
- Heera Singh Sandhu, founder of Nakai Misl
- Jai Singh Kanhaiya, founder of Kanhaiya Misl
- Jhanda Singh Dhillon, chieftain of Bhangi Misl
- Jind Kaur, Maharani of Sikh Empire who fought two wars against the British
- Mai Bhago, Sikh soldier and Guru Gobind Singh's bodyguard
- Nawab Kapur Singh, ruler of Singhpuria Misl
- Ranjit Singh, founder of the Sikh Empire, known as the “Lion of Punjab” for unifying the Sikh Misls
- Sada Kaur, chief of Kanhaiya Misl
- Sardar Tara Singh Ghaiba, chieftain of Dallewalia Misl

=== Muslim Jats ===
- Ali Mohammed Khan, founder of Kingdom of Rohilkhand, progenitor of Rohilla dynasty.
- Chitu Khan, a pindari general who played a prominent role in the Third Anglo-Maratha war.
- Nur Muhammad Chattha, a chieftain who was influential in the Gujrat region of Punjab and, along with his descendants Pir Muhammad, Ghulam Muhammad and Jan Muhammad, resisted the Sikh Misls.
- Mutawassil Khan, Nawab of Bijapur.
- Muzaffar Jang Hidayat, third Nizam of Hyderabad State.
- Saadullah Khan, Grand Vizier of Mughal Empire

== Literature and artists ==
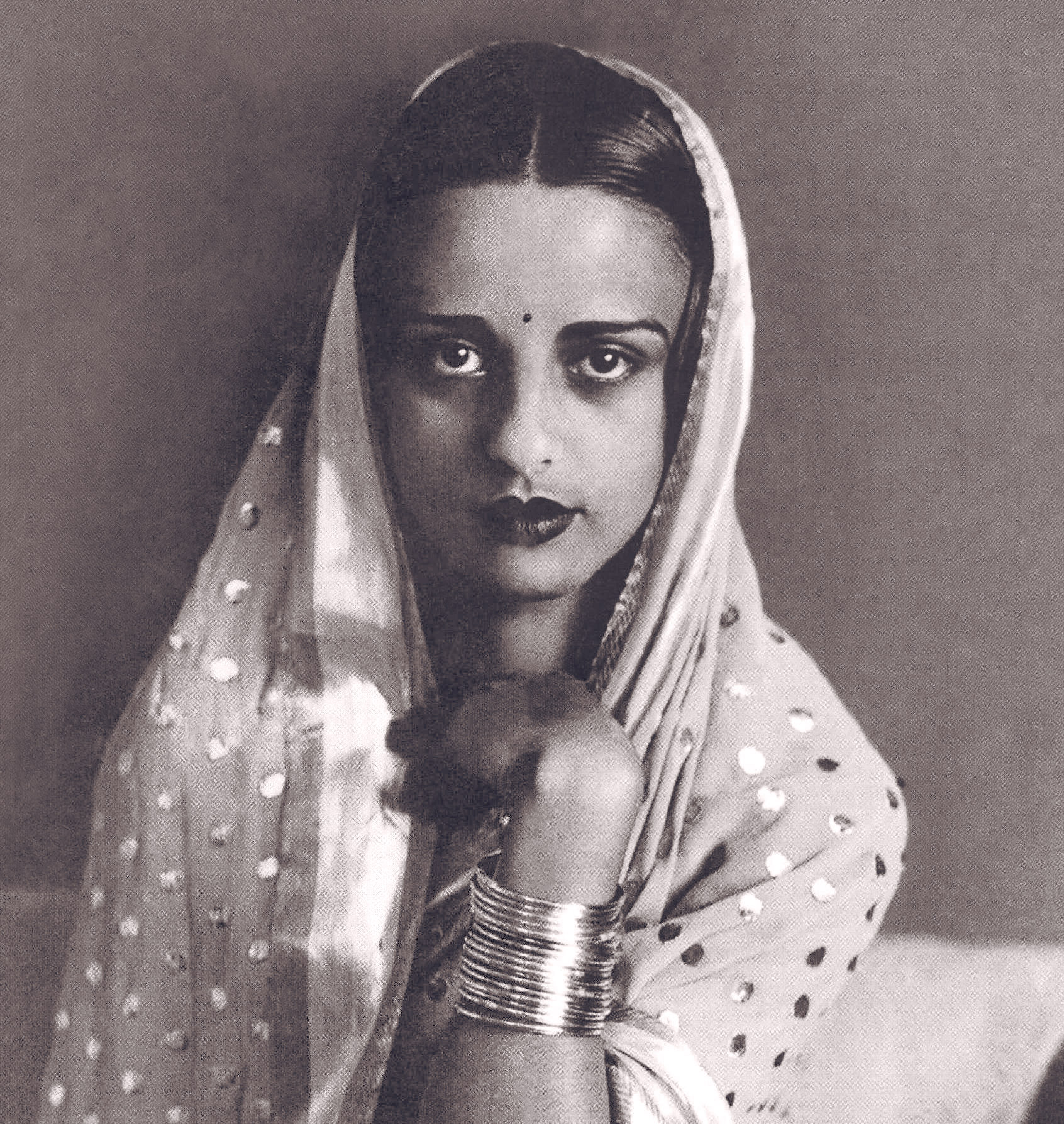
Amrita Sher-Gil, one of the greatest avant-garde women artists of the early 20th century

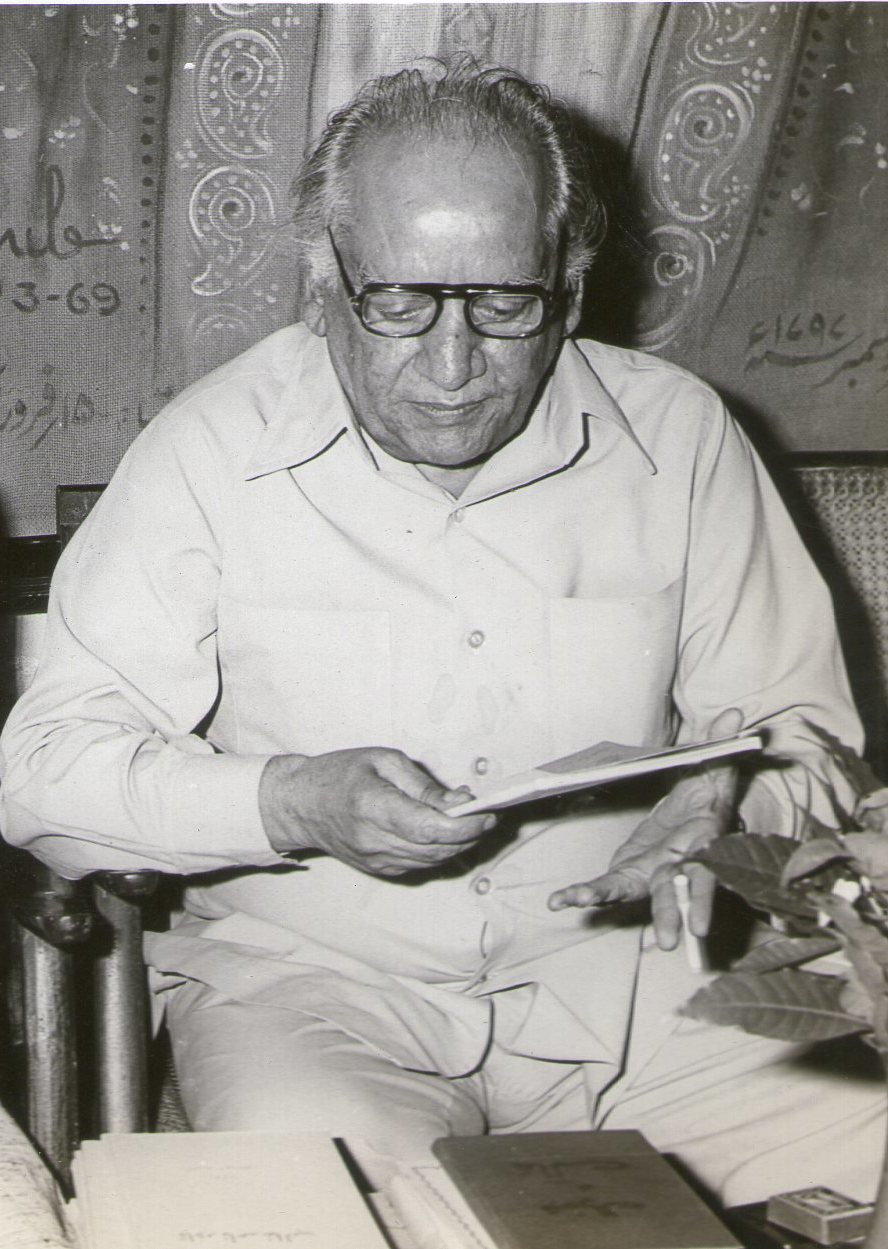
Faiz Ahmed Faiz, Pakistani poet and author of Punjabi and Urduliterature.

- Amrita Sher-Gil, one of the greatest avant-garde women artists of the early 20th century and a pioneer in modern Indian art.
- Faiz Ahmed Faiz, Pakistani revolutionary poet
- Qadir Yar
- Sukhpal Vir Singh Hasrat
- Jaswant Singh Kanwal
- Kulwant Singh Virk
- Sant Singh Sekhon, Punjabi writer
- Daljit Nagra
- Fauji Kavi Mehar Singh, Haryanvi language poet and a freedom fighter

== Politicians ==
=== Politicians of India ===
==== Prime ministers ====
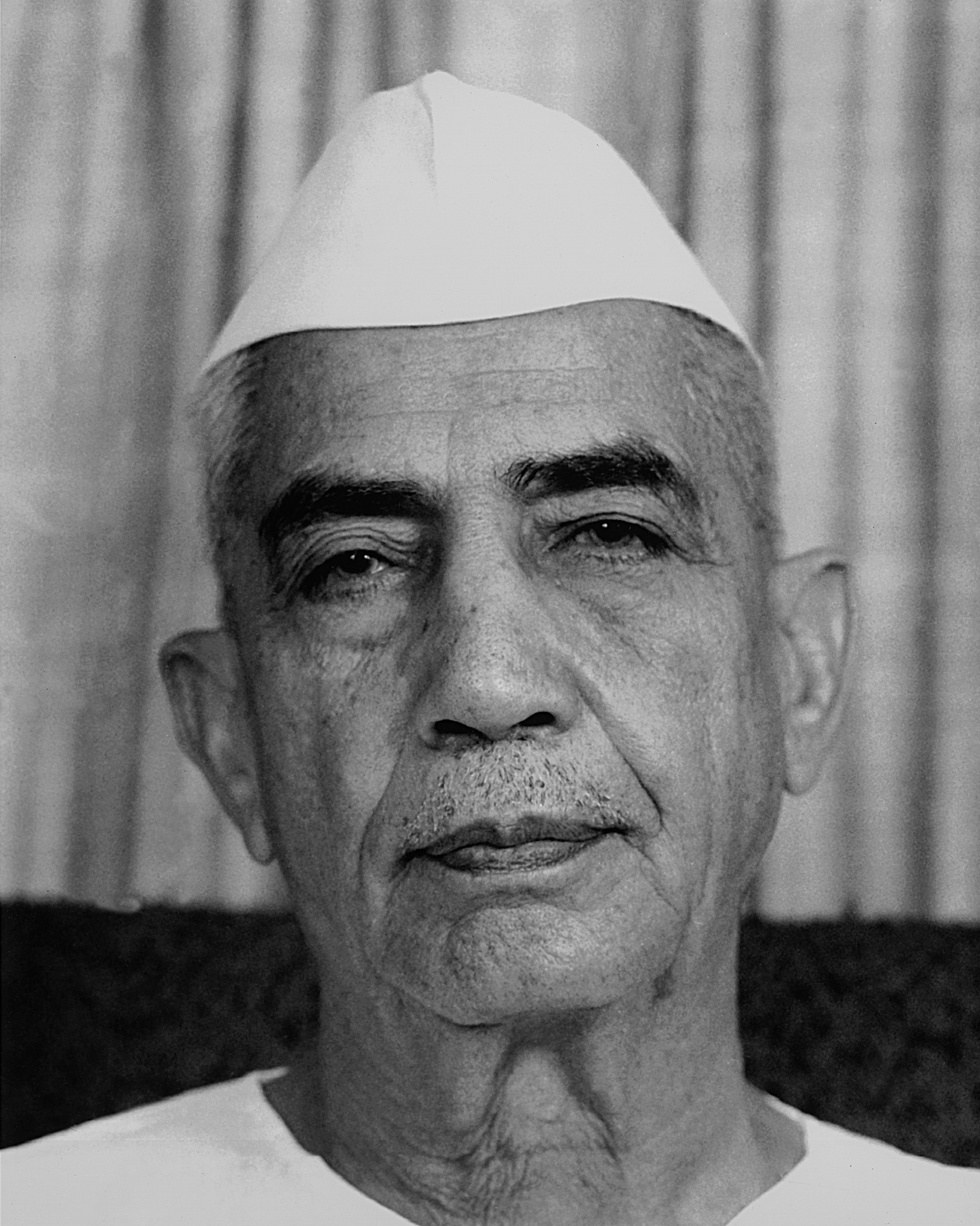
Charan Singh, former prime minister of India

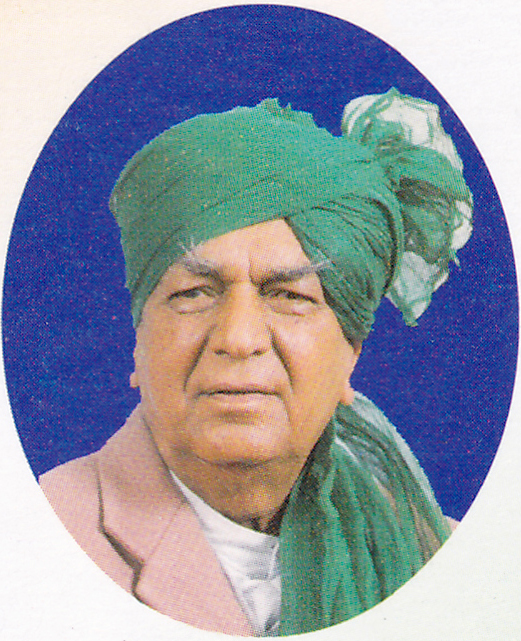
Devi Lal, former deputy prime minister of India

- Charan Singh, former Prime Minister of India
- Devi Lal, former Deputy Prime Minister of India

==== Presidents ====
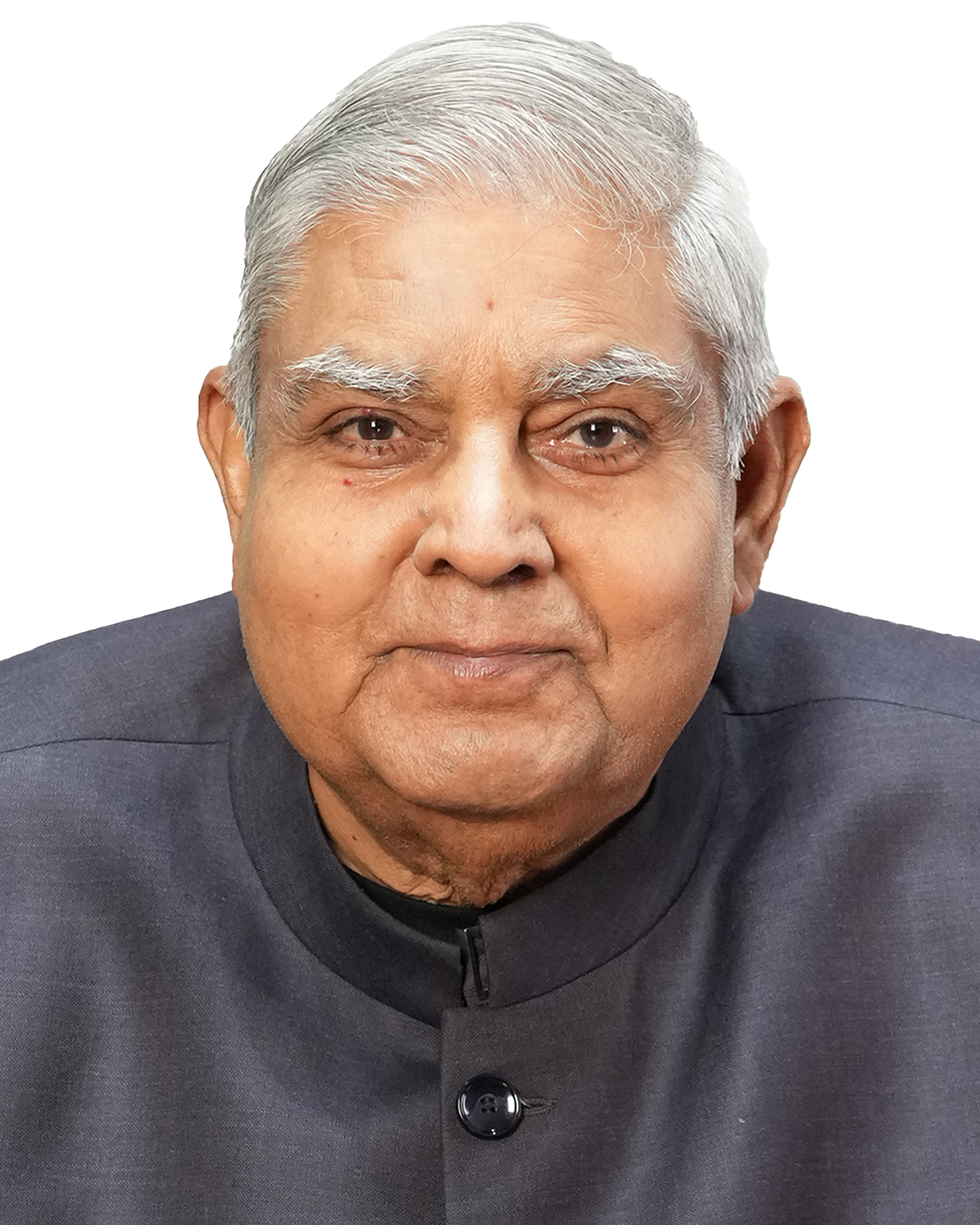
Jagdeep Dhankhar, former vice-president of India

- Jagdeep Dhankhar, former Vice-President of India

==== Chief ministers ====
- Bansi Lal, former Chief Minister of Haryana
- Beant Singh, former Chief Minister of Punjab
- Bhagwant Mann, Chief Minister of Punjab
- Bhupinder Singh Hooda, former Chief Minister of Haryana
- Darbara Singh, former Chief Minister of Punjab
- Gian Singh Rarewala, former chief minister of Patiala and East Punjab States Union
- Gurnam Singh, former Chief Minister of Punjab
- Harcharan Singh Brar, former Chief Minister of Punjab
- Hukam Singh, former Chief Minister of Haryana
- Kamla Beniwal, former Governor of Gujarat, Mizoram, Tripura, and former Deputy Chief Minister of Rajasthan
- Lachhman Singh Gill, former Chief Minister of Punjab
- Om Prakash Chautala, former Chief Minister of Haryana
- Parkash Singh Badal, former Chief Minister of Punjab
- Partap Singh Kairon, former Chief Minister of Punjab
- Sahib Singh Verma, former Chief Minister of Delhi
- Sukhbir Singh Badal, former Deputy Chief Minister of Punjab
- Surjit Singh Barnala, former Chief Minister of Punjab

==== Union cabinet ministers ====
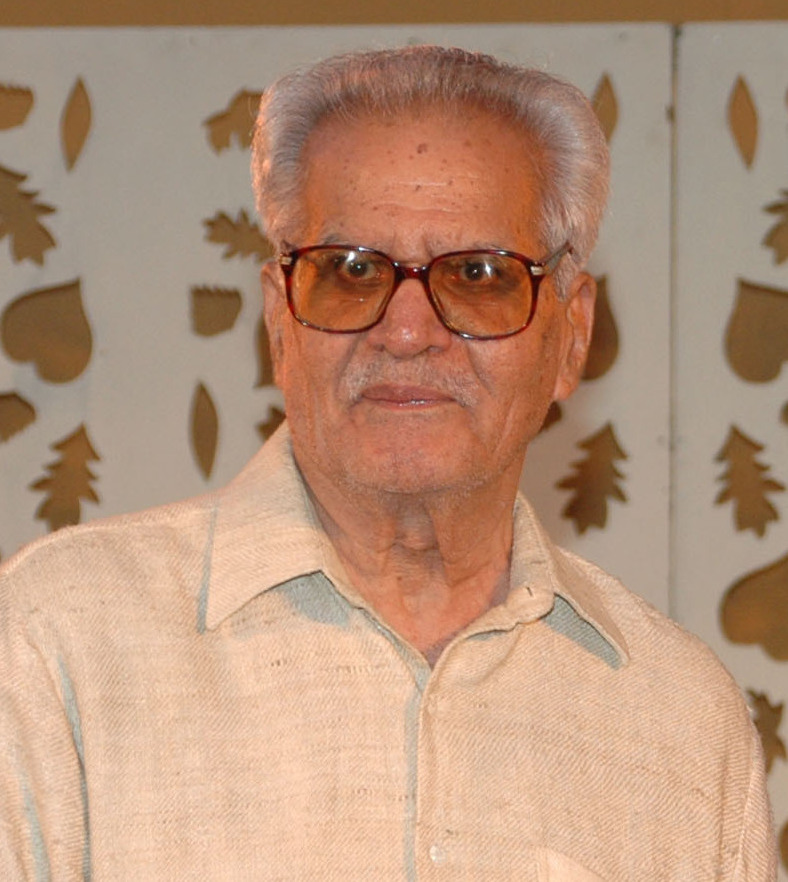
Ram Niwas Mirdha, former deputy chairperson in the Rajya Sabha and Union cabinet minister

List of Jats who had served in the cabinet of Government of India

- Ajit Singh, former Minister of Agriculture and Minister of Civil Aviation
- Baldev Singh, former Defence Minister of India
- Balram Jakhar, longest serving Speaker of the Lok Sabha and former union cabinet minister of Agriculture
- Daulat Ram Saran, former Minister of Urban Development
- Nathuram Mirdha, former Minister of Food and Civil Supplies
- Ram Niwas Mirdha, former Minister of Communications, Textiles, Health and Irrigation
- Shish Ram Ola, former Minister of Labour and Employment
- Natwar Singh, former Minister of External Affairs (India)
- Swaran Singh, former Minister of External Affairs and Minister of Defence

==== Members of parliament ====
List of Jats who has served in the Parliament of India

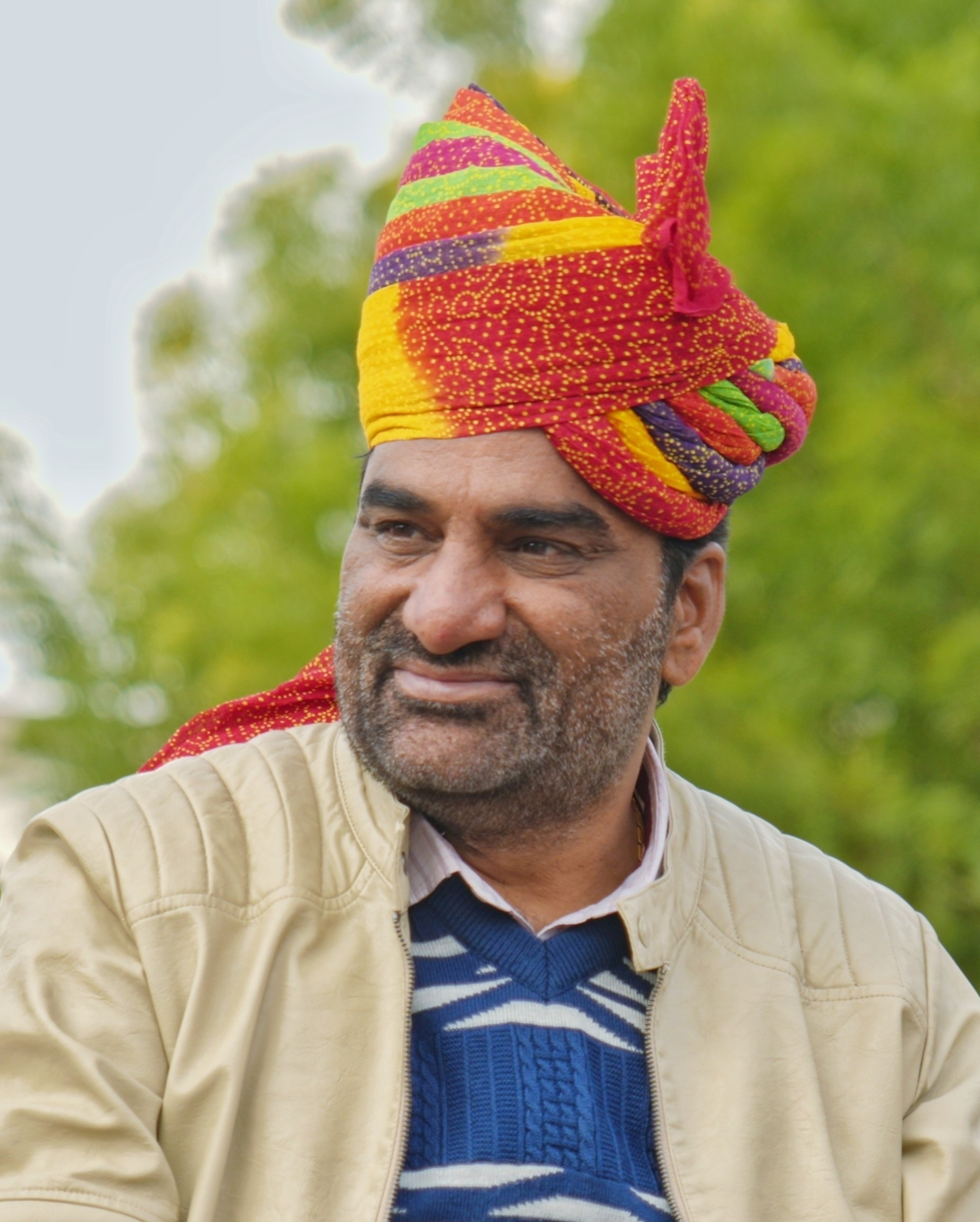
Hanuman Beniwal, founder of the Rashtriya Loktantrik Party

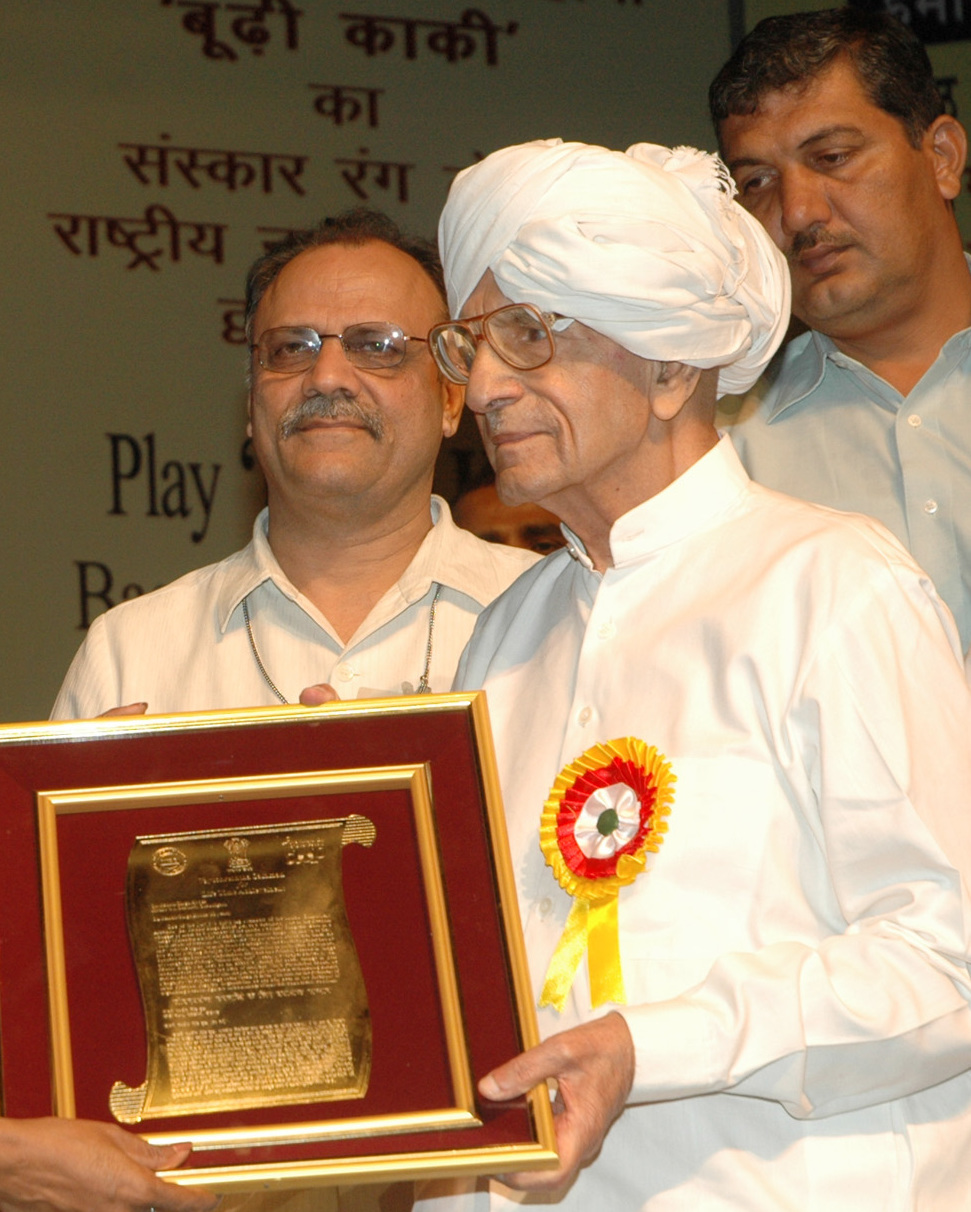
Ranbir Singh Hooda, Indian independence activist and former Member of Parliament

- Badri Ram Jakhar, former Member of Parliament in the Lok Sabha
- Chaudhary Bharat Singh former Member of Parliament in the Lok Sabha
- Gayatri Devi, former Member of Parliament in the Lok Sabha, and wife of Chaudhary Charan Singh
- Gurdial Singh Dhillon, former two-term Speaker of the Lok Sabha and former president of Inter-Parliamentary Union
- Hanuman Beniwal, Member of Parliament, Lok Sabha and founder of the Rashtriya Loktantrik Party
- Jagdev Singh Talwandi former Member of Parliament in the Lok Sabha, and the Rajya Sabha
- Jayant Chaudhary, Member of Parliament, Rajya Sabha and national president of the Rashtriya Lok Dal
- Kumbha Ram Arya, Indian independence activist and former Member of Parliament in the Lok Sabha and Rajya Sabha
- Ram Raghunath Choudhary, former Member of Parliament in the Lok Sabha
- Ranbir Singh Hooda, Indian independence activist and former Member of Parliament in the Lok Sabha and Rajya Sabha
- Sanwar Lal Jat, former Member of Parliament in the Lok Sabha
- Satya Pal Malik, former Member of Parliament in the Lok Sabha, and Rajya Sabha, and former Governor of Meghalaya, Goa, Jammu Kashmir, and Bihar
- Sona Ram Choudhary, former Member of Parliament in the Lok Sabha
- Sumedhanand Saraswati, former Member of Parliament in the Lok Sabha

==== State politicians ====
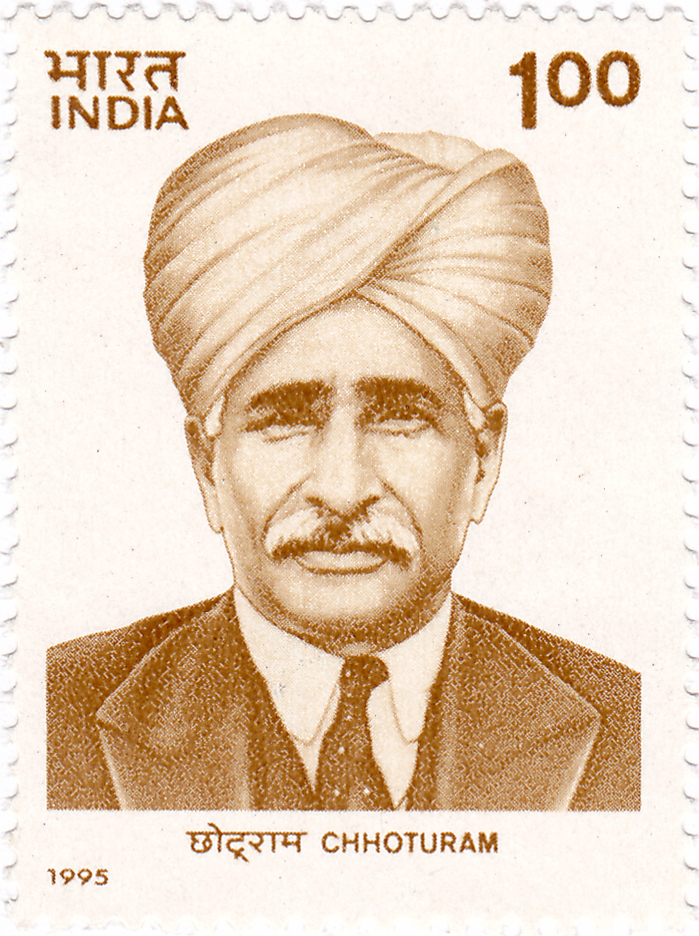
Sir. Chhotu Ram, co-founder of Unionist party and a ideologue

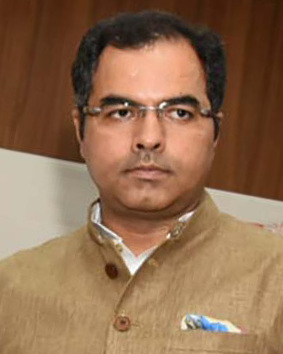
Parvesh Verma, cabinet minister in Delhi government and former Member of the Lok Sabha

List of Jats who were active in the state politics

- Amra Ram, agrarian leader from Shekhawati region of Rajasthan
- Chaudhary Badan Singh, former Member of Uttar Pradesh Legislative Assembly, and known for his contributions in Braj literature
- Chhotu Ram, co-founder of Unionist party and a ideologue of the colonial era
- Digamber Singh, former cabinet minister in Government of Rajasthan
- Fateh Singh, leader in Punjabi Suba movement
- Harchand Singh Longowal, president of the Akali Dal during Insurgency in Punjab, India
- Harkishan Singh Surjeet, former Communist leader from Punjab
- Harlal Singh, peasant leader and Indian independence activist
- Jagjit Singh Lyallpuri, co-founder of Communist Party of India (Marxist)
- Mahipal Maderna, former cabinet minister in Government of Rajasthan.
- Parasram Maderna, former speaker and nine-term member of the Rajasthan Legislative Assembly
- Parvesh Verma, cabinet minister in Government of Delhi and former Member of Parliament, Lok Sabha
- Raja Man Singh, former titular head of Bharatpur state and politician
- Rameshwar Lal Dudi, former Leader of Opposition (LoP) in the Rajasthan Assembly and Member of 13th Lok Sabha
- Vishvendra Singh, former cabinet minister in Government of Rajasthan, and former Member of Parliament in the Lok Sabha

=== Politicians of Pakistan and USA ===
List of Jats who had served in politics outside India

==== Pakistan ====
- Mumtaz Jajja, former Member of the National Assembly of Pakistan
- Muhammad Rafiq Tarar, former President of Pakistan
- Shahbaz Gill, Chief of Staff to former prime minister Imran Khan
- Sikandar Hayat Khan, former Premier of the Punjab
- Muhammad Zafarullah Khan, former Minister for Foreign Affairs (Pakistan) and former President of the United Nations General Assembly
- Chaudhry Zahoor Elahi, former Member of National Assembly of Pakistan
- Shujaat Hussain, former Prime Minister of Pakistan
- Sardar Muhammad Arif Nakai, descendant of the Nakai misldars, 12th Chief Minister of (Pakistani) Punjab.
- Chaudhary Naseer Ahmed Abbas, member of the National Assembly of Pakistan, brother of Air Chief Zaheer Sidhu

==== USA ====
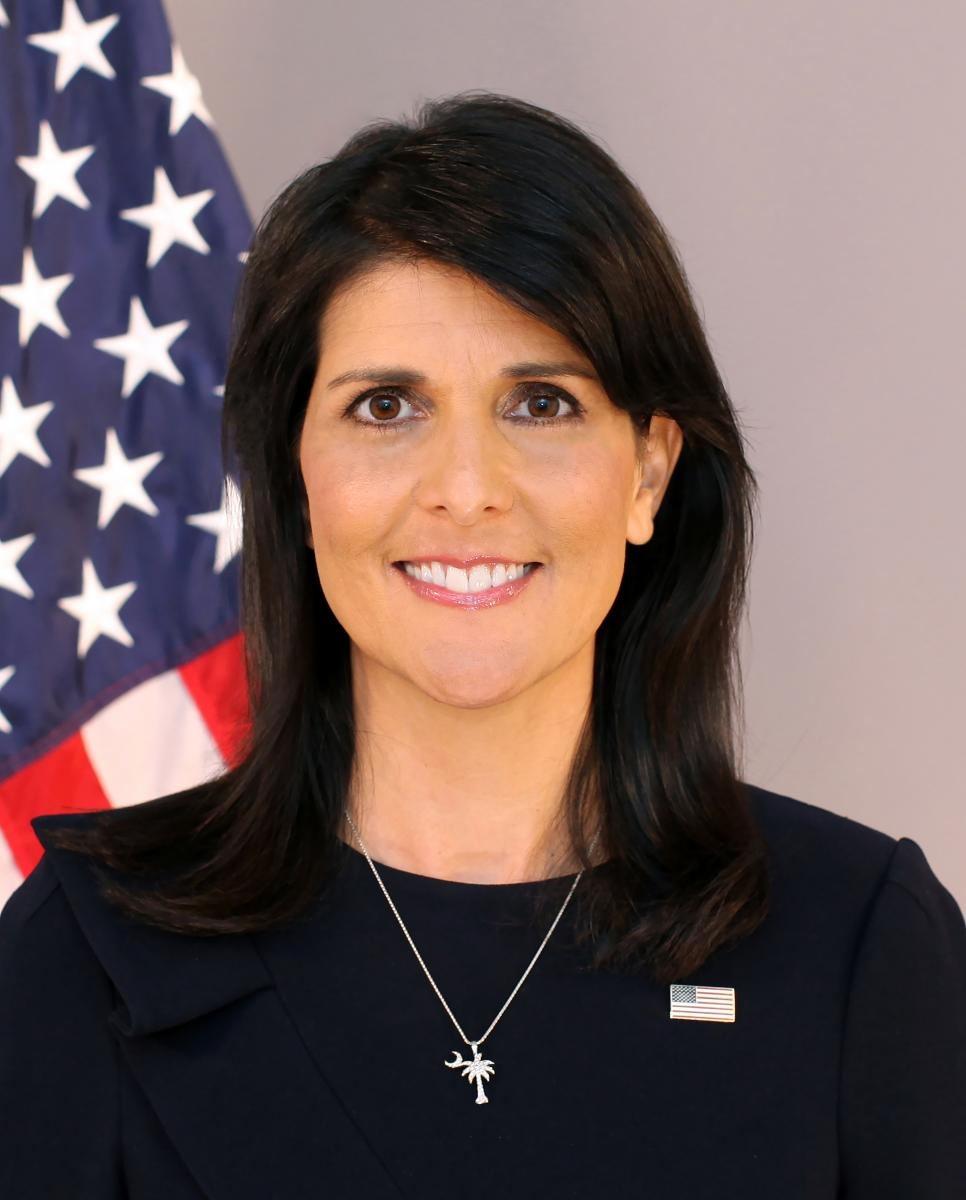
Nikki Haley, former United States Ambassador to the United Nations

- Nikki Haley, former Governor of South Carolina and United States Ambassador to the United Nations. Haley is the first Indian American to serve in a cabinet of the United States.

== Religious figures and saints ==
- Baba Buddha, first granthi (custodian and reader) of the Guru Granth Sahib
- Bhagat Dhanna, a mystic poet and a Vaishnav devotee.
- Bhai Bala, follower and companion of Guru Nanak (first Guru of Sikhism) and one of the most revered in Sikhism
- Bhai Mani Singh, 18th-century Sikh scholar, warrior, and martyr who compiled Sikh scriptures
- Bidhi Chand, a devout Sikh of Guru Hargobind
- Dharam Singh, one of the Panj Pyare (the Five Beloved Ones), initiated by Guru Gobind Singh during the founding of the Khalsa in 1699.
- Garib Das, Indian saint, poet, and spiritual reformer from Haryana
- Karmabai, a devotee of Krishna
- Nischaldas, Hindu saint and scholar
- Randhir Singh, known for his role in the Ghadar and Babbar Akali movements and for founding the Akhand Kirtani Jatha.
- Veer Teja, considered as a incarnation of Shiva and worshipped as a deity in northern India

== Rulers of princely states ==
List of notable Jats during the British era who hailed from royal families that ruled princely states

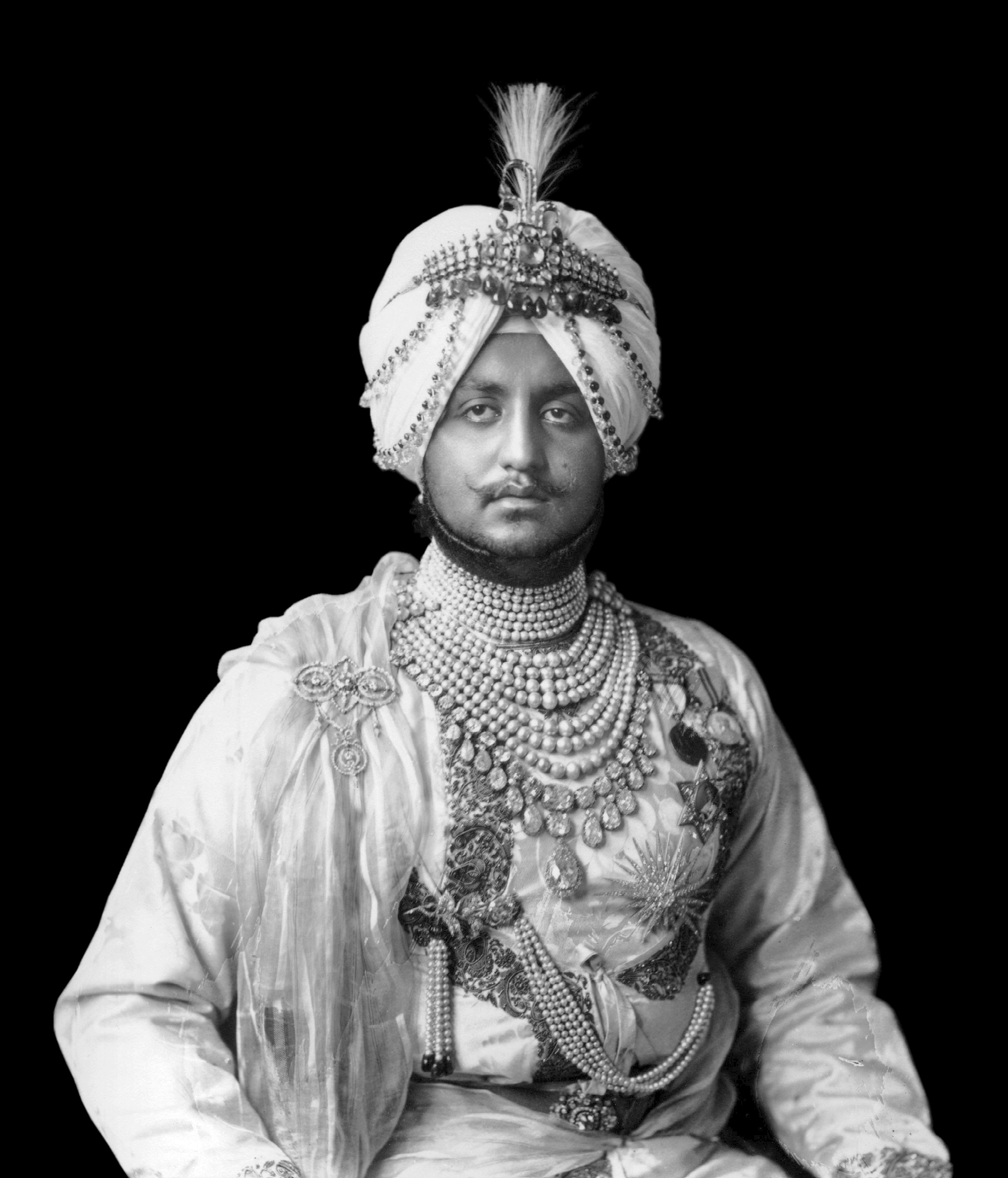
Bhupinder Singh of Patiala, Maharaja of Patiala and a cricket player

- Ala Singh, founder and first Maharaja of Patiala
- Bhim Singh Rana, Maharaja of Gohad State, and Gwalior State
- Bhupinder Singh of Patiala, Maharaja of Patiala
- Brijendra Singh, last Maharaja of Bharatpur State
- Faizullah Khan, founder and first Nawab of Rampur State.
- Hira Singh of Nabha, ruler of Nabha State
- Kirat Singh, founder and first Maharaj-Rana of Dholpur State
- Kishan Singh, Maharaja of Bharatpur
- Pratap Singh of Nabha, last ruler of Nabha State
- Udai Bhan Singh, Maharaj-Rana of Dholpur State

== Scholars ==
- Abdus Salam, Pakistani theoretical physicist who won Nobel Prize in physics for his electroweak unification theory
- Kahn Singh Nabha, Sikh scholar
- Piara Singh Gill, Indian nuclear physicist and first director of Central Scientific Instruments Organisation (CSIO)

== Musicians ==
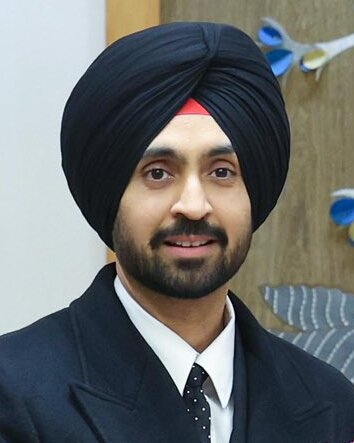
Diljit Dosanjh, Indian singer, actor and film producer

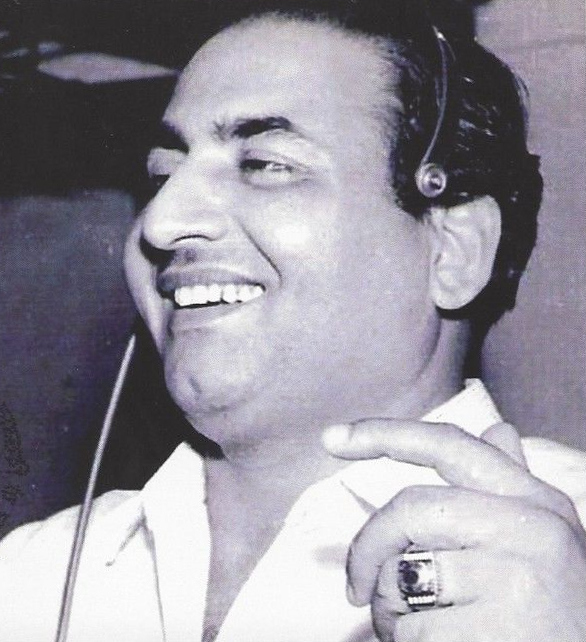
Mohammed Rafi, he is considered to have been one of the greatest and most influential singers of the Indian subcontinent.

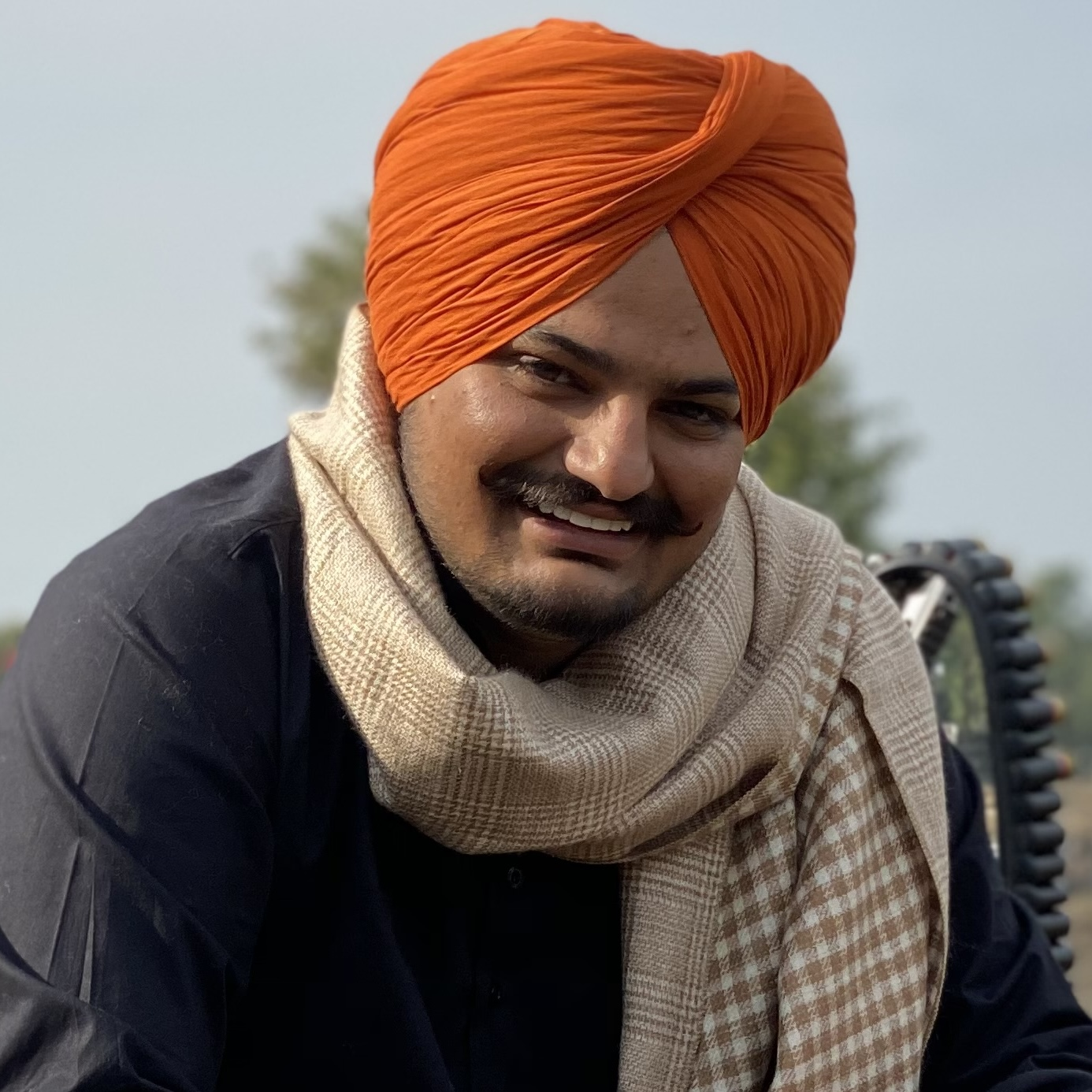
Sidhu Moose Wala, one of the most influential and successful Punjabi rappers of all time

- Diljit Dosanjh, Indian Punjabi-language singer
- Harrdy Sandhu, Indian singer
- Labh Janjua, Indian Punjabi-language singer
- Karan Aujla, Indian singer and rapper
- Mohammed Rafi, Indian playback singer and musician
- Sidhu Moose Wala, Indian Punjabi-language singer

== Social reformers and activists ==
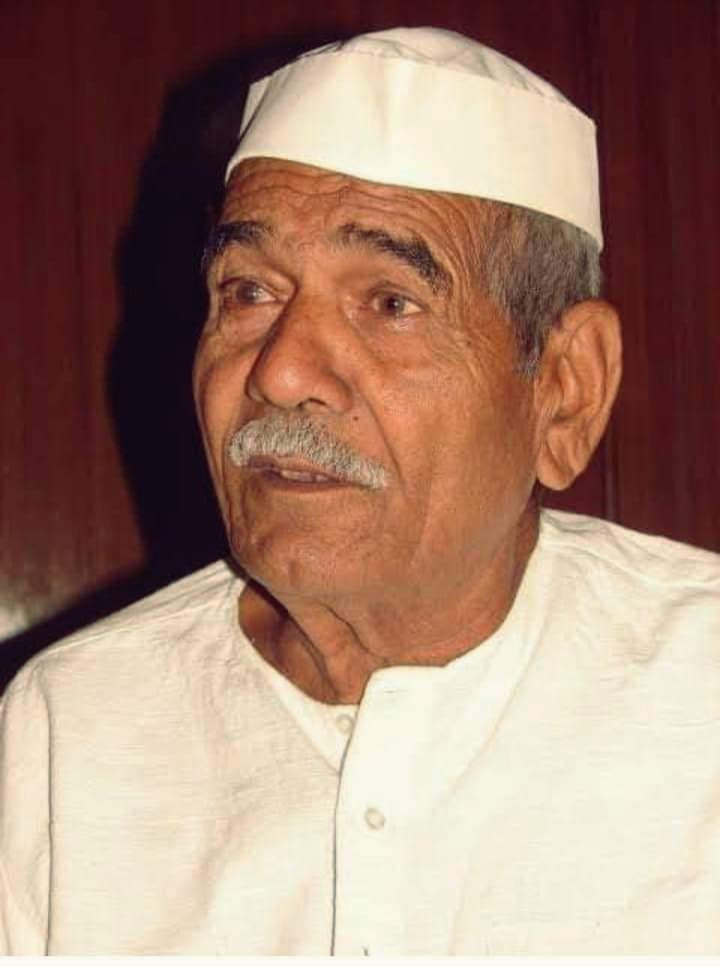
Mahendra Singh Tikait, founder of Bharatiya Kisan Union and popularly known as Baba Tikait

- Swami Keshwanand, social reformer and Indian independence activist
- Satendra Singh disability activist
- Mahendra Singh Tikait, distinguished farmer leader and co-founder of the Bharatiya Kisan Union. He was popularly known as Baba Tikait.

== Sports ==
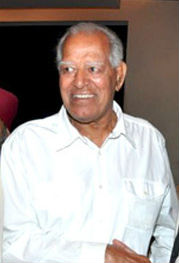
Dara Singh, former Indian professional wrestler and actor

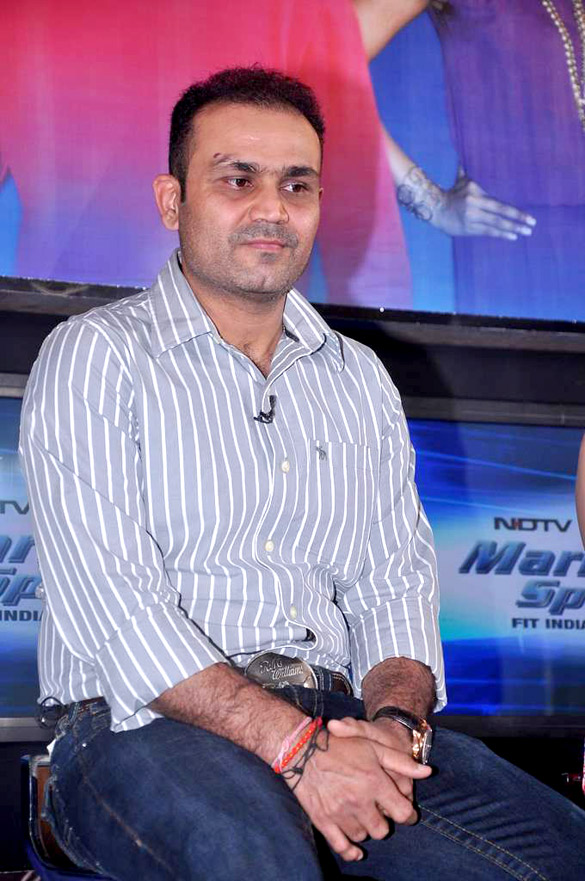
Virendra Sehwag, Widely regarded as one of the most destructive batsmen

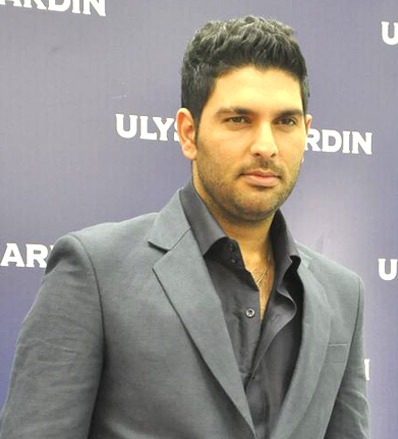
Yuvraj Singh, man of the tournament in 2011 Cricket World Cup

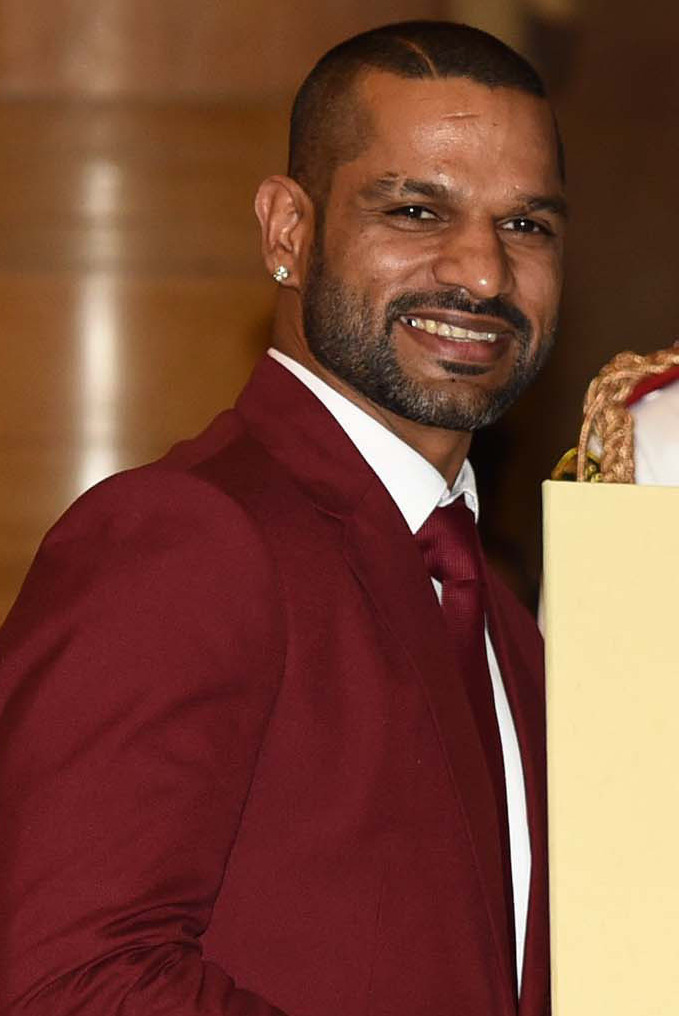
Shikhar Dhawan, Indian former cricketer, commonly referred as Gabbar and Mr. ICC

=== Athletics ===
- Krishna Poonia, gold medalist at the 2010 Commonwealth Games
- Arshad Nadeem, gold medalist at 2024 Olympics

=== Boxing ===
- Vijender Singh, bronze medalist at 2008 Olympics

=== Cricket ===
- Balwinder Sandhu, member of the 1983 World Cup squad for India
- Monty Panesar, former English cricketer
- Navjot Singh Sidhu former Indian cricketer and former Member of the Parliament
- Nitish Rana, Indian cricketer
- Praveen Kumar former Indian cricketer
- Shikhar Dhawan, former Indian cricketer
- Virender Sehwag, former Indian cricketer
- Yuvraj Singh, former Indian cricketer

=== Hockey ===
- Balbir Singh Sr., Indian hockey player and three-time Olympic gold medalist
- Pargat Singh former captain of India men's national field hockey team
- Savita Punia Indian hockey player

=== Shooting ===
- Avneet Sidhu Indian sport shooter and gold medalist at 2006 Commonwealth Games
- Chandro Tomar, oldest women sharpshooter in the world

=== Wrestling ===
- Babita Kumari Phogat, Indian wrestler and gold medalist at 2014 Commonwealth Games
- Bajrang Punia, bronze medalist in Olympics and gold medalist at Asian games and Commonwealth Games
- Chandgi Ram, Indian freestyle wrestler and gold medalist at 1970 Asian games
- Dara Singh, former Indian professional wrestler and actor

=== Paralympics ===
- Deepa Malik, first Indian woman to win a medal in Paralympic Games

== Criminals ==
- Sukhdev Singh Babbar, founder of Babbar Khalsa
- Jarnail Singh Bhindranwale, Sikh militant and jathedar of Damdami Taksal
- Avtar Singh Brahma, founder of Khalistan Liberation Force
- Gurjant Singh Budhsinghwala, leader of Khalistan Liberation Force
- Jagga Jatt, a 20th-century heroic bandit rebel of Punjab. He is known as the Robin Hood of Punjab
- Harjinder Singh Jinda, militant and assassinator of General Vaidya
- Bindy Johal, Canadian gangster and drug trafficker
- Gurbachan Singh Manochahal, founder of Bhindranwale Tiger Force of Khalistan
- Labh Singh, leader of Khalistan Commando Force
- Satwant Singh, assassin of Indira Gandhi
- Surinder Singh Sodhi, militant and assassin of V. N. Tiwari

== Others ==
- Debi Singh Tewatia, former chief justice of Calcutta High Court

== See also ==
- List of Jat dynasties and states
- Jat Hindu
- Jat Sikh
- Jat Muslim
