= Bhagwan Singh =

Indian diplomat, army officer, and administrator

Captain Bhagwan Singh (1916–1995) was an Indian diplomat, army officer, and administrator, who served as High Commissioner of India to Fiji, and subsequent to his retirement was prominent in Jat causes.

== Family ==
Bhagwan Singh's son, Ajay Singh, has continued the family tradition of maintaining links with Fiji, when he was appointed the Indian High Commissioner to Fiji in 2005.
