= Raja Maldeo =

Jat Ruler

- Maharaja of Sidhmukh State

Maharaja of Sidhmukh State
- Reign: Around 15th century
- Born: Sidhmukh State
- Died: near Delhi
- House: Chahar Jat
- Religion: Hinduism

Raja Maldeo Chahar was a 15th-century Chahar Jat ruler who governed the town of Sidhmukh State (or Kanjan) in the Jangladesh (Bikaner) region of present-day Rajasthan. He is primarily known for a conflict with the army of the Delhi Sultan, Khizr Khan Sayyid.

== Life And Rule ==
His capital was located at Sidhmukh (or Kanjan) in the Jangladesh region, which is now part of Bikaner and Churu districts in Rajasthan. The Chahar Jats were a prominent clan in this area, ruling several small states in the 13th-15th centuries.

== Conflict with the Delhi Sultanate ==
In 1416 AD, the Delhi Sultan Khizr Khan Sayyid's army clashed with Raja Maldeo's forces while returning from Jaisalmer. Historical accounts describe a dramatic incident involving two fighting bulls, which were calmed by Maldeo's beautiful and courageous daughter, Somadevi, by catching them by their horns. Impressed by her strength and courage, the Sultan sought Somadevi's hand in marriage. Raja Maldeo, being a proud and self-respecting ruler, refused the offer. The Sultan then attempted to take her by force, which led to a bloody and decisive battle between the Chahar forces and the much larger Delhi army.

== Legacy ==
In the ensuing war, both Raja Maldeo and his daughter Somadevi fought valiantly but Raja Maldeo was killed and his daughter Rajkumari Somadevi and the remaining members of their family and the Chahar community migrated to the Jhunjhawati region (present-day Jhunjhunu) after losing their kingdom.

This historical account highlights the Chahar ruler's refusal to compromise his pride and the valor displayed by his daughter in the face of a powerful adversary.

== See also ==
- List of Jats
- Jangladesh
- Somadevi
