= Chhotu Ram =

Indian politician (1881–1945)

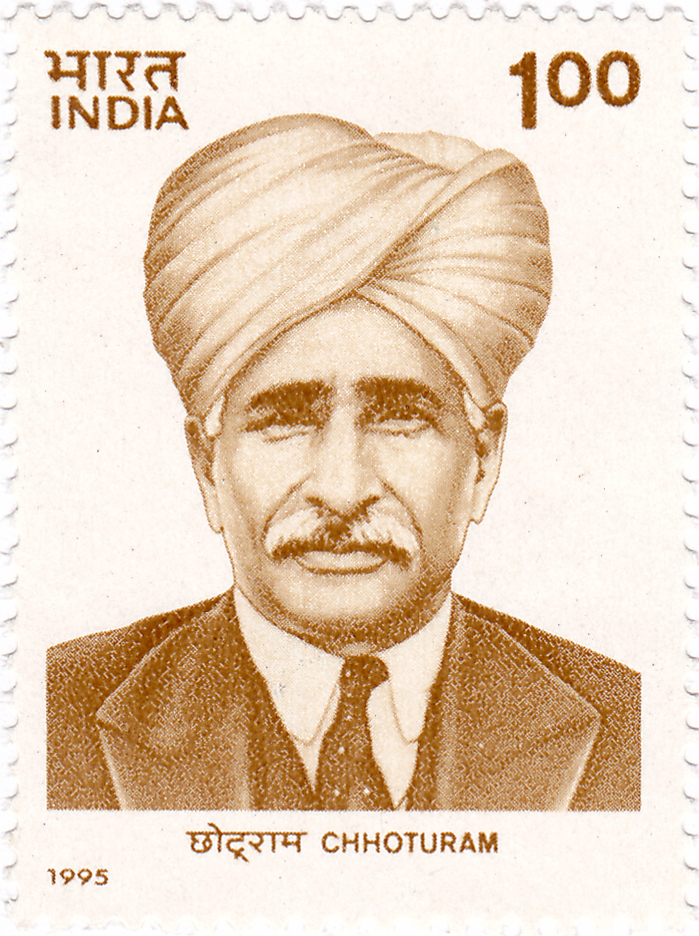
- Sir Chhotu Ram on a 1995 stamp of India
- Born: Ram Richpal Ohlyan; 24 November 1881; Garhi Sampla, Punjab, British India (present-day Haryana, India)
- Died: 9 January 1945 (aged 63); Lahore, Punjab, British India (present-day Punjab, Pakistan)
- Other names: Deenbandhu; Rahbar-e-Azam; Kisano ke Maseeha
- Education: St. Stephen's College
- Title: For the honesty of social work, he was given the title of the Sir.
- Political party: Unionist Party (Punjab)
- Spouse: Giano Devi
- Family: Birender Singh (grandson)

Ram Richpal Ohlyan (born 24 November 1881 – 9 January 1945), better known as Sir Chhotu Ram, was a prominent Indian agrarian reformer, politician and ideologue in Punjab Province during pre independent India. He was known for his advocacy for the rights of farmers and oppressed rural communities. A co-founder of the National Unionist Party, he played a pivotal role in shaping agrarian policies that protected peasants from exploitative moneylenders and promoted agricultural development in pre-independent India. Chhotu Ram is popularly known as "Deenbandhu", "Rahbar-e-Azam" and "Kisano ke Maseeha", as he championed a secular, cross-communal alliance of Hindu, Muslim, and Sikh agriculturists, countering the rising influence of the Indian National Congress and Muslim League in Punjab.

His legislative reforms, including the Punjab Restitution of Mortgage Land Act and the Punjab Agricultural Produce Markets Act, laid the foundation for modern agricultural market systems and farmer protections, earning him a knighthood in 1937 and the title of Rao Bahadur. He is widely regarded as the father of Bakhra Dam. He co-founded the Jat Mahasabha and started a weekly newspaper, Jat Gazette.

== Early life, education and personal life ==
Ram Richpal Ohlyan was born on 24 November 1881, in Garhi Sampla, Rohtak district (then Punjab, now Haryana) in a Jat family to Chaudhary Sukhi Ram Singh and Sarla Devi. Nicknamed Chhotu Ram as he was youngest of his brothers, he grew up amidst agrarian distress caused by British colonial policies. At age 12, he attended middle school in Rohtak. In 1897, he joined Christian Mission School in Delhi, mastering English, a key skill in colonial India. He earned scholarships and enrolled at St. Stephen’s College, Delhi, graduating with a Bachelor of Arts in 1905. During his studies, he emerged as a student leader, organising a strike against the hostel warden to protest poor living conditions and advocate for better facilities. His leadership in subsequent agitations earned him the nickname “General Robert” for his commanding presence.

Parts of his education were funded by philanthropist Seth Chhaju Ram Lamba. He worked as a personal secretary and superintendent of education department in Kalakankar State of Raja Rampal Singh. He then shifted to Agra and pursued his degree in law from Law College, Agra in 1911 and practised law firstly at Agra and then at Rohtak. He was also influenced by the Arya Samaj and joined the Indian National Congress in 1916 and was president of district congress committee of Rohtak from 1917 to 1920. He severed his relations with the Congress party due to differences with the leadership over the Non-cooperation movement in 1920. He was around eleven years of age, when he married Giano Devi. He had at least one daughter, Bhagwani Devi, whose son, Birender Singh, became a politician. Chhotu Ram lived simply, maintaining his Jat roots, dressing traditionally, and prioritising public service over personal leisure. His empathy for farmers earned him the title Deenbandhu (Friend of the Poor). The title was given to him during an event on Vaisakhi after the allotment of land to Scheduled Castes in 1938, while the title of Rehbar-i-Azam was conferred upon him during a conference in Lyallpur in 1942.

== Political career ==
Chhotu Ram’s political career was defined by his commitment to the agrarian community and his pragmatic approach to navigating the complexities of colonial politics. His entry into politics began in 1916 when he joined the Indian National Congress, serving as the president of the Rohtak District Congress from 1917 to 1920. However, his tenure with the Congress was short-lived, because he perceived that Mahatma Gandhi neglected the issues of farmers during Non-cooperation movement.

In 1920, Chhotu Ram co-founded the Zamindaran Party, which later became the Unionist Party alongside Fazl-i-Hussain and Sikandar Hayat Khan. Unionist Party was a cross-communal political organisation that sought to represent the interests of Punjab’s agrarian communities, and had the support of Hindus, Muslim Jats, and Sikh Jats. The party’s ideology was rooted in agrarianism, advocating for policies that protected farmers from exploitative moneylenders, ensured fair land revenue systems, and promoted rural development.

In the 1937 provincial elections in Punjab, his Unionist party emerged victorious and Chhotu Ram became revenue minister on 1 April 1937, and held this position till his death in January 1945. Chhotu Ram was the driving force behind the Bhakra Dam project, a vision to transform the Sutlej River into a lifeline for farmers through irrigation and power. He signed an agreement with the Raja of Bilaspur in November 1944, finalised on 8 January 1945 and due to this reason he was regarded as father of Bakhra Dam.

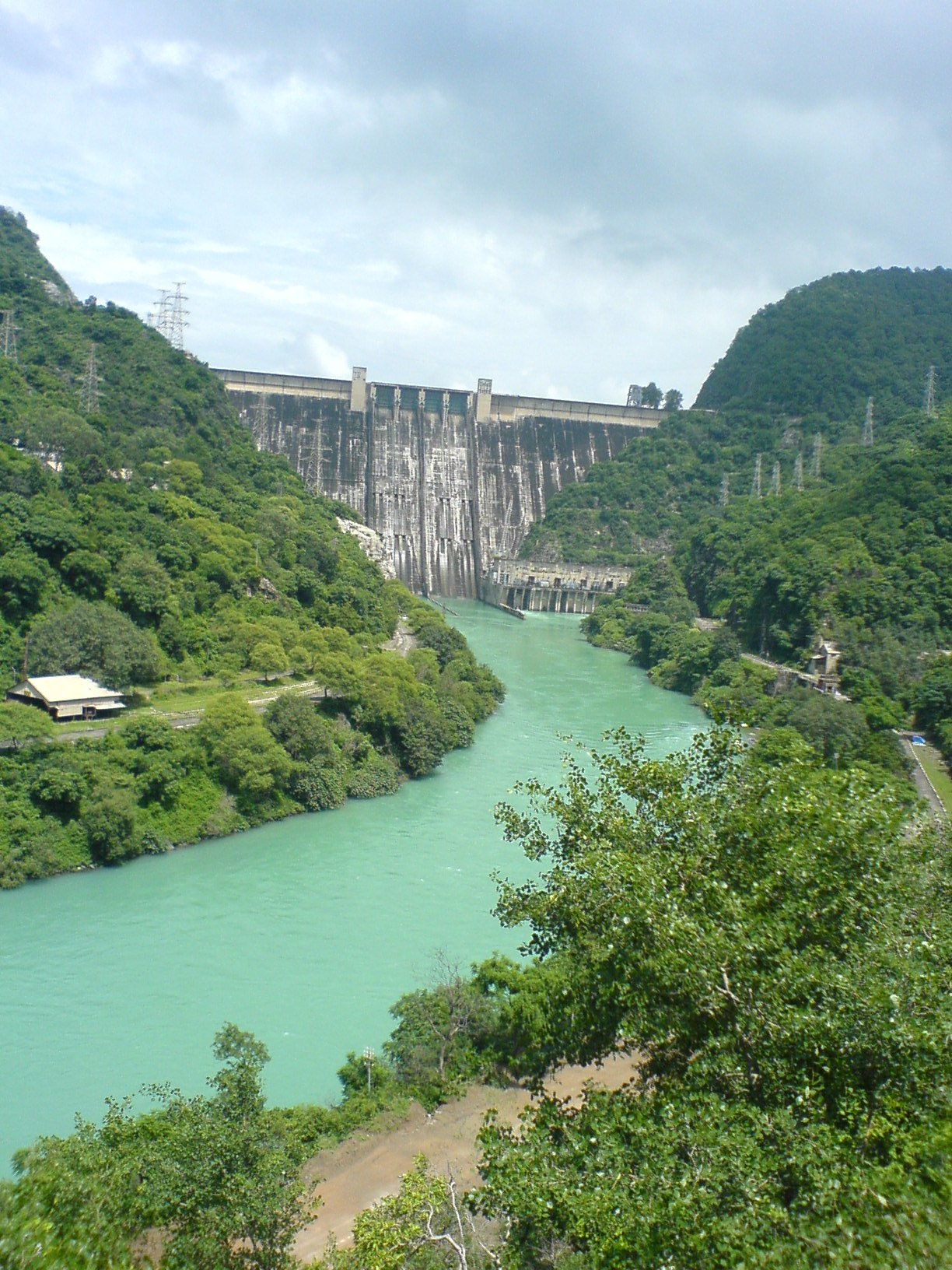
Chhotu Ram, founder of Bhakra Dam. He signed agreement with the Raja of Bilaspur in 1944

Chhotu Ram’s political views were shaped by his belief that the economic empowerment of farmers was essential for India’s progress. He argued that the british colonial system disproportionately burdened small farmers, who were trapped in cycles of debt and poverty. His advocacy for agrarian reforms was revolutionary for its time, as it challenged the entrenched power of moneylenders and urban elites. He also emphasised inter-community harmony, recognising that Punjab’s diverse population—comprising Hindus, Muslims, and Sikhs.

Chhotu Ram played an important role in agricultural reforms in India during the 1930s. He introduced the concept of compensating farmers for their farming expenses, which later developed into the ‘Minimum Support Price’ system. He was involved in enacting nine laws aimed at improving the financial and social conditions of farmers. Notable legislation included the Punjab Relief of Indebtedness Act, 1934, and the Punjab Debtors’ Protection Act, 1936. These laws introduced measures such as debt settlement boards, interest rate limits, and protections for tillers.

As a member of the Punjab Legislative Council, Chhotu Ram held various portfolios, including agriculture and revenue, during the 1930s and 1940s. His significant legislative contributions included:

Punjab Land Alienation Act (1900): While Chhotu Ram did not draft this act, he was a staunch supporter of its principles, which restricted the transfer of agricultural land to non-agriculturists, protecting farmers from losing land to moneylenders.

Punjab Restitution of Mortgaged Lands Act (1938): This legislation, championed by Chhotu Ram, allowed farmers to reclaim lands lost to moneylenders by repaying only the principal amount of their loans, without exorbitant interest.

Mandi Samiti Act (1940): This act established regulated markets (mandis) to ensure fair prices for farmers’ produce, reducing exploitation by middlemen.

His commitment to secularism and inter-community cooperation was evident in his leadership of the Unionist Party, which balanced the interests of Punjab’s diverse communities. However, the rise of communal politics in the 1940s, fuelled by the Muslim League and the demand for Pakistan, challenged the Unionist Party’s cross-communal model, contributing to its decline after Chhotu Ram’s death.

== Writing career ==
Chhotu Ram was also a writer in pre-independent India, using essays, pamphlets, articles, and poetry to advocate for farmers’ rights. His works, rooted in his Jat heritage, were clear, accessible, and empathetic, aimed at educating rural communities and influencing British colonial policy.

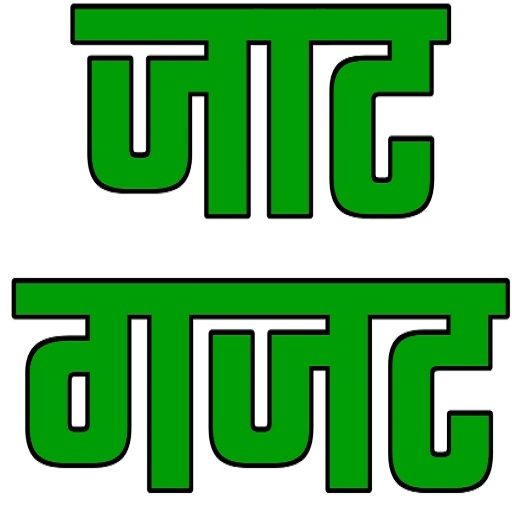
Jat Gazette (logo), started by Chhotu Ram in 1916

He established and edited the Jat Gazette, a Hindi weekly newspaper launched in 1916 in Rohtak, which championed agrarian interests. He edited this newspaper until 1924 and wrote influential columns, including the seventeen-part Bechara Zamindar, later compiled as a book, highlighting small farmers’ economic struggles. The Gazette, a tool for social change, unified Jat identity and drew colonial scrutiny.

His essays in Bechara Zamindar blended economic analysis with emotional appeals, while pamphlets like those on the 1938 Act empowered farmers. Works like Thug Bazaar ki Sair criticised urban market exploitation. Under pseudonyms like ‘Bismil’, he wrote patriotic poetry from age 19, later compiled in volume, Sir Chhotu Ram: Writings and Speeches. His book The Crisis in India addressed broader socio-political issues.

Books

- Ram, Sir Chhotu (2019). Sir Chhotu Ram: 1907-1932. Haryana Academy of History and Culture.
- Ram, Sir Chhotu (1996). The Crisis in India: Reflections of Sir Chhotu Ram. Haryana Historical Society. ISBN 978-81-7871-132-4.
- Ram, Sir Chhotu (2010). Government, Politics, and Society in Colonial India. Hope India Publications. ISBN 978-81-7871-178-2.
- Ram, Sir Chhotu (2021). Wicārā kisāna (in Punjabi). Lokgeet Parkashan. ISBN 978-93-5205-336-0.
- Ram, Sir Chhotu (1931). Need for Radical Retrenchment: A Collection of Articles Written : Dedicated to The Punjab National Unionist Party.

== Legacy ==
Chhotu Ram, known as Deenbandhu (Friend of the Poor), was a pivotal figure in colonial Punjab’s agrarian reform and social justice movements. A Jat leader and Unionist Party member, his work as a legislator, writer, and educator impacted rural India, especially in Punjab and Haryana.

As minister in Punjab government (1924–26, 1937–45), Chhotu Ram introduced key reforms like the Punjab Restitution of Mortgaged Lands Act of 1938 and the Punjab Debtors’ Protection Act, empowering farmers against moneylenders and supporting the Punjab Land Alienation Act of 1900. His leadership in the Unionist Party fostered Hindu-Muslim unity and rural stability.

Chhotu Ram founded the Jat Education Society (1913) in Rohtak, now including Chhotu Ram Institute of Law, Chhotu Ram College of Education, Kurukshetra and supported educational institutions like Jat Heroes’ Memorial College. His Rohtak home was known as Prem Nivas or Nili Kothi, is near Chhotu Ram Chowk. A samadhi at his cremation site hosts annual tributes.

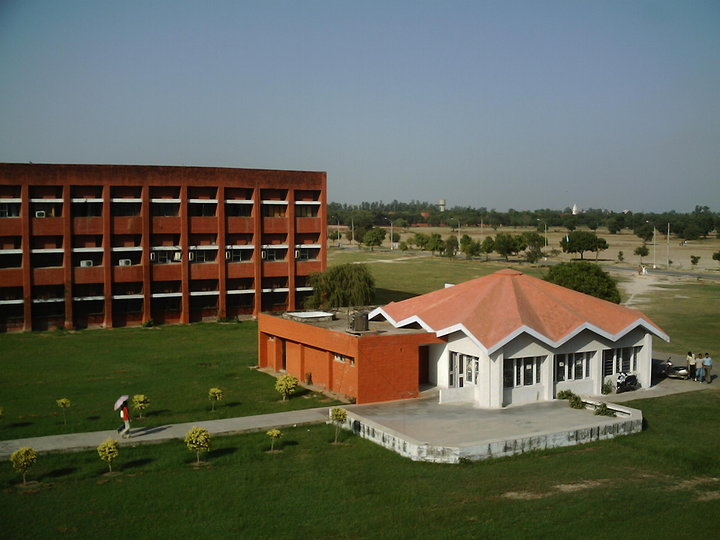
Deenbandhu Chhotu Ram University of Science and Technology (DCRUST) at Murthal.

Institutions like Deenbandhu Chhotu Ram University of Science and Technology (DCRUST), Sir Chhotu Ram College of Education (Kurukshetra), and Sir Chhotu Ram Institute of Engineering & Technology (Meerut), Deenbandhu Chhotu Ram Thermal Power Station, Jat Anglo Sanskrit school and a 1995 commemorative stamp by the Government of India reflect his impact. A 64-foot statue at Sampla, Haryana, unveiled in 2018 by the prime minister Narendra Modi.

Chhotu Ram allocated a significant portion of his ministerial salary to fund scholarships and stipends for talented students from economically disadvantaged backgrounds. As Punjab’s Revenue Minister, he established the Peasants’ Welfare Fund, which notably supported future Nobel laureate Abdus Salam. His efforts were instrumental in passing two key agrarian laws: the Punjab Relief of Indebtedness Act of 1934 and the Punjab Debtors’ Protection Act of 1936, which provided critical relief to farmers.

Chhotu Ram died in Lahore on 9 January 1945. His body was carried back to his home in Rohtak city, where it was cremated at the Jat Heroes Memorial Anglo Sanskrit Senior Secondary School.

== Bibliography ==
- Singh, Divyajyoti (2015). The Forgotten Ram: Lore and Legend of Sir Chhotu Ram. Authorspress. ISBN 978-93-5207-035-0.
- Gopal, Madan (1997). Sir Chhotu Ram: The Man & the Vision. Bhagirath Sewa Sansthan. ISBN 978-81-85083-28-5.
- Gopal, Madan (2021). Sir Chhotu Ram: A Political Biography. B.R. Publishing Corporation. ISBN 978-93-91123-02-4.
- Singh, Balbir (2009). Sir Chhotu Ram: A Saga of Inspirational Leadership. Publications Division, Ministry of Information and Broadcasting, Government of India. ISBN 978-81-230-1596-5.
- Ram, Tika (1979). Sir Chhotu Ram: A Biography. Ritu.
- Deenbandhu Sir Chhotu Ram. Chaudhary Charan Singh Haryana Agricultural University. 1992.
