= Sampla (town) =

- Town
- Location in Haryana, India Sampla (India)
- Country: India
- State: Haryana
- District: Rohtak

Government
  - Type: District Administration Rohtak
  - Body: Sub Divisional Magistrate (S.D.M)

Languages
  - Official: Hindi
- Time zone: UTC+5:30 (IST)
- PIN: 124501

Sampla is a town and a Municipal committee in the Rohtak district in north Indian state of Haryana. It lies on the NH9 which connects Rohtak to Delhi. It functions as the tehsil headquarters for Sampla.
