= Ajay Singh Chahar =

Indian politician and diplomat (1950–2020)

Shri Ajay Singh Chahar

High Commissioner to Fiji Islands
- In office 2005–2007

Member of Parliament, Lok Sabha
- In office 1989–1991
- Preceded by: Nihal Singh
- Succeeded by: Bhagwan Shankar Rawat
- Constituency: Agra

Union Deputy Minister, Railways
- In office 23 April 1990 – 10 November 1990
- Preceded by: Mahaveer Prasad
- Succeeded by: Position not in use
- Constituency: Agra

President of the Jat Mahasabha
- In office March 2013 – May 2013
- Preceded by: Dara Singh
- Succeeded by: Amarinder Singh

Member of the Uttar Pradesh Legislative Council
- In office July 1986 – December 1989

Personal details
- Born: 15 August 1950 Uttar Pradesh, India
- Died: 9 June 2020 (aged 69)
- Party: Janata Dal
- Education: St. Stephen's College, Delhi University
- Profession: Diplomat, Politician, Journalist

Ajay Singh Chahar (15 August 1950 – 9 June 2020) was an Indian politician and diplomat from Agra, Uttar Pradesh. He was elected to 9th Lok Sabha representing Agra constituency after defeating Singh family who held the seat since Independence. He was a member of Janata Dal.

He served as union deputy minister for railways in V. P. Singh Government. He was also elected to Uttar Pradesh Legislative Council in 1986. He was India's High Commissioner to Fiji Islands, Tonga, Tuvalu and Cook Islands from 2005 to 2007. He also served a president of All India Jat Mahasabha briefly from 30 March 2013 to 12 May 2013.

== Early life and education ==
Singh was born on 15 August 1950 in a Chahar Jat family in village Jaingara, tehsil Kiraoli, Agra, Uttar Pradesh. His father Capt. Bhagwan Singh was an Indian diplomat and bureaucrat who served as Indian High commissioner to Fiji. He studied at Modern School, New Delhi before graduating in English (Hons) Literature from St Stephens College in 1971. In school, he was adjudged the "Best Sportsman of the Year (1967) and captained the school hockey, swimming and water polo teams. He captained the college as well as the university swimming and water polo teams, participating in inter-state and inter-university championships from 1965 to 1971.

He did his post graduate studies at the School of Journalism, University of Canterbury, Christchurch, New Zealand in 1974 and later worked as publicity and promotions officer with Television One, Avalon, Lower Hutt, in Wellington. He returned to Fiji as senior sub editor with The Fiji Times before coming back to India after five years at the end of December 1976.

== Career ==
From 1977 to 1980, he worked as assistant editor at Surya India (a monthly magazine), news editor at India Today and deputy editor in charge of the Morning Echo (an English language tabloid daily of The Hindustan Times group).

In 1980 he took over as managing trustee of the Kisan Trust and editor-in chief of its publications: Asli Bharat (Hindi Weekly newspaper), Asli Bharat (Urdu weekly magazine) and Real India (English weekly magazine). These journals were opposition papers espousing the cause of rural India, hence their names. The Hindi weekly newspaper (later converted into a monthly magazine) won a wide and devoted readership, particularly in rural areas of the Hindi heartland. As a monthly, it was acclaimed as one of the leaders in "alternative" journalism as opposed to the "mainstream".

As managing trustee of the Kisan Trust, he worked closely with veteran Socialist leaders Madhu Limaye and George Fernandes, Shri Biju Patnaik, Karpoori Thakur and Mulayam Singh Yadav. His close colleagues included Sharad Yadav, Ram Vilas Paswan. They were all trustees of the trust and its chairman was Chaudhary Charan Singh. After Charan Singh's death in 1987, all the veteran leaders unanimously elected him chairman in his place.

He was elected to the Uttar Pradesh Legislative Council unopposed in 1986. In 1989 he won the Lok Sabha seat from Agra defeating a family that had held the seat since Independence. He served as Union Deputy Minister for Railways in V. P. Singh Government.

He later served as Chairman of the Centre for Cultural Resources and Training (CCRT), an autonomous body with the Human Resources Ministry. Later as chairman, Governing Body of the Sri Aurobindo College, Delhi University.

In 2005 he was appointed India's High Commissioner to Fiji Islands, Tonga, Tuvalu and Cook Islands by Indian National Congress government. He served there until June 2007. His father had held the same post thirty years earlier.

He briefly served as president of All India Jat Mahasabha from 30 March 2013 to 12 May 2013.
