= Hanumanpur, Odisha =

Hanumanpur
- Village
- Interactive map of Hanumanpur
- Coordinates: 21.1547°N 85.0578°E
- Country: India
- State: Odisha
- District: Angul

Languages
  - Official: Odia
- Time zone: UTC+5:30 (IST)
- Vehicle registration: OD-19/OD-35
- Website: odisha.gov.in

Hanumanpur is a village in Angul district, Kaniha block, Odisha, India.
