= Hanumanpur, Gujarat =

Hanumanpur
- village
- Country: India
- State: Gujarat
- District: Amreli

Population
  - Total: 1,077

Languages
  - Official: Gujarati, Hindi
- Time zone: UTC+5:30 (IST)
- Vehicle registration: GJ-
- Website: gujaratindia.com

Hanumanpur is a village in Amreli district, Gujarat, India. At the 2011 census, the population was 1,077 in 213 families.
