= Jat Gazette =

Hindi language newspaper

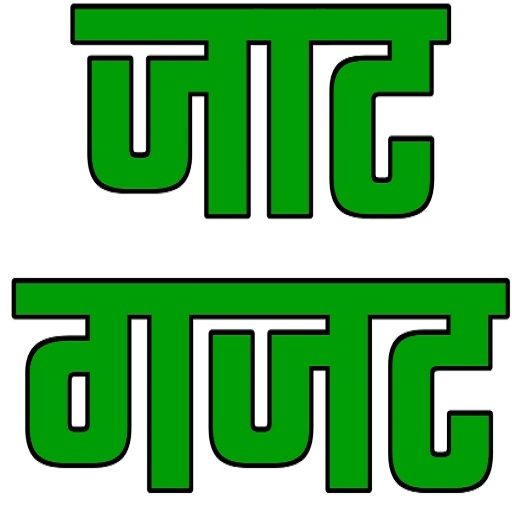
- Type: Weekly newspaper
- Political alignment: Unionist Party
- Language: Hindi
- Headquarters: Rohtak Haryana
- Circulation: 1500 (1st issue)

Jat Gazette was a Hindi language newspaper published in India. Started on 30 May 1916, from Rohtak (now Haryana), the weekly newspaper was published every Tuesday by Chhotu Ram. This newspaper has now also taken the form of digital media.

== History ==
In 1916, weekly 'Jat Gazette' – Apart from schools, Ch. Chhotu Ram also did the work of bringing awareness among the farmers through newspapers and articles. For this purpose a newspaper named 'Jat Gazette' was brought out. Rs 1500 for the expenditure was given by Rai Bahadur Choudhary Kanhaiyalal of village Matanhel for the first publication and 'Jat Gazette' weekly started.

The first editor of the Jat Gazette was Pt. Sudarshan ji, the second Pt. Shri Ram Sharma's father, Pt. Bishambharnath Sharma, Jhajjar Wale, the third Ch. Molad Singh who was very enthusiastic. In 1924, Shadiram Yatri became the editor and then Chhoturam Dalal village Chhahra and since 2014 Dharam Singh Sampalwal is the advocate editor.
