= Sukhpal Vir Singh Hasrat =

- Born: 23 August 1938; Khanewal, Punjab Province, British India
- Died: 1995 (aged 56–57)
- Occupations: Poet, publisher, writer, novelist

Sukhpal Vir Singh Hasrat (1938 – c. 2001) was an Indian poet in the Punjabi language.

== Early life ==
Hasrat was born in 1938 in Khanewal, British India. Hasrat and his family, however, moved to India after the partition of India in 1947. He attended and graduated from the Panjab University, Chandigarh.

== Career ==
After completing his education Hasrat joined the Public Relation Department of the Punjab Government.

Following which he started serving as an editor of the Punjab Government's monthly journal, Jagriti.

Hasrat's career as a poet started in 1966, when he published his poem collection — Sarsabaz Patjharhan.

Throughout his career as a poet, Hasrat has published as many as twelve collections of his work. Hussan Kinare, Hayati de somme, Van kambia, Shakti naad, Hasrat kavya, Shakti da darya being among his most significant collections.

Other than being a poet he has written a novel, a biography and few books on applied criticism.

== Awards ==
Hasrat received the Sahitya Akademi award for his book, Suraj te kahkashan in 1980. Two of his collections, Shakti naad and Suraj da kafla were awarded by the Government of Punjab. The books were marked as the best collections in Punjab for the years 1967–68 and 1971–72.
