= World Jat Aryan Foundation =

Organization serving the Jat community

World Jat Aryan Foundation is an organisation of the Jats, that aims to serve the Jat community around the world. It was founded in 2001, having Hoshiar Singh as its first president.

The foundation is presided by Navjot Singh Sidhu. Sahib Singh Verma, Joginder Singh Toor served the World Jat Aryan Foundation as its former president.

== World Jat Congress (2003) ==
In September 2003, the foundation hosted the World Jat Congress in Belgrade. However, the foundation event criticism from the External Affairs Minister, Yashwant Sinha, as the foundation was directly in touch Serbia-Montenegro Embassy at India, while the Ministry of External Affairs had no clue about this. As the Delhi elections were just approaching, the Prime Minister of India, Atal Bihari Vajpayee, got involved to convince Sahib Singh Verma to cancel his scheduled program to attend the World Jat Congress. Following the controversy, Vajpayee issued a written appeal to all the Cabinet Ministers of India to consult the Ministry of External Affairs on "issues concerning India’s projection or representation abroad, and initiatives involving foreign governments" before scheduling such events. As a consequence, the congress was held in September later that year which had been scheduled to be held July.

== Aims and objectives ==
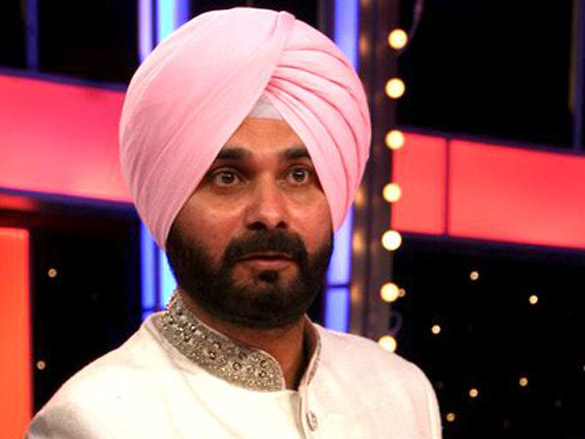
Navjot Singh Sidhu — the president of World Jat Aryan Foundation

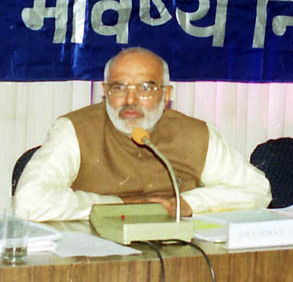
Sahib Singh Verma

World Jat Aryan Foundation is known to organise international conferences at multiple venues, specifically focusing on Jat community's interests in several fields, like research in history of the Jats, paying tributes to deceased renowned Jats, and agriculture related issues. In 2008, the foundation hosted a major conference with Rastriya Surveer Jat Akta Aour Samjhota Manch at Sonipat, to boost the campaigning by Jat Arakshan Sangharsh Samiti to provide reservation for Jats in OBC quota.

Navjot Singh Sidhu has urged the Jats to "turn away from all religious and demographical differences and unite on a common platform to discuss and find out ways and means of betterment of the community." Sidhu has announced that to achieve the goal of uniting the Jats around the world and motivating them in order to fight the challenges in front of the community, he would schedule tours to various countries where the Jats are residing.

== See also ==
- Jat reservation agitation
