= Deaths in March 1982 =

The following is a list of notable deaths in March 1982.

Entries for each day are listed alphabetically by surname. A typical entry lists information in the following sequence:

- Name, age, country of citizenship at birth, subsequent country of citizenship (if applicable), reason for notability, cause of death (if known), and reference.

== March 1982 ==
=== 1 ===
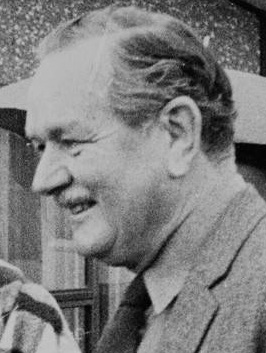
Frank Gill

- Ben Adamowski, 75, American politician and lawyer
- Andrée Bonhomme 76, Dutch composer
- Frank Gill, 65, New Zealand air force pilot and politician
- Eddie Kushner, 69, Canadian professional football player
- Liu Puren, Chinese politician
- T. Vincent Quinn, 78, American jurist and politician from New York
- Frank Sargeson, 78, New Zealand writer
- Lilian Scharman, 80, American tennis player
- Robert S. Shankland, 74, American physicist and historian
- Louise L. Sloan, 83, American ophthalmologist and vision scientist
- Charlie Spivak, 78, American trumpeter and bandleader
- William Freeman Twaddell, 75, American linguist and professor of German
- Dutt Yanni, 58, American pioneering driver of modified stock cars

=== 2 ===
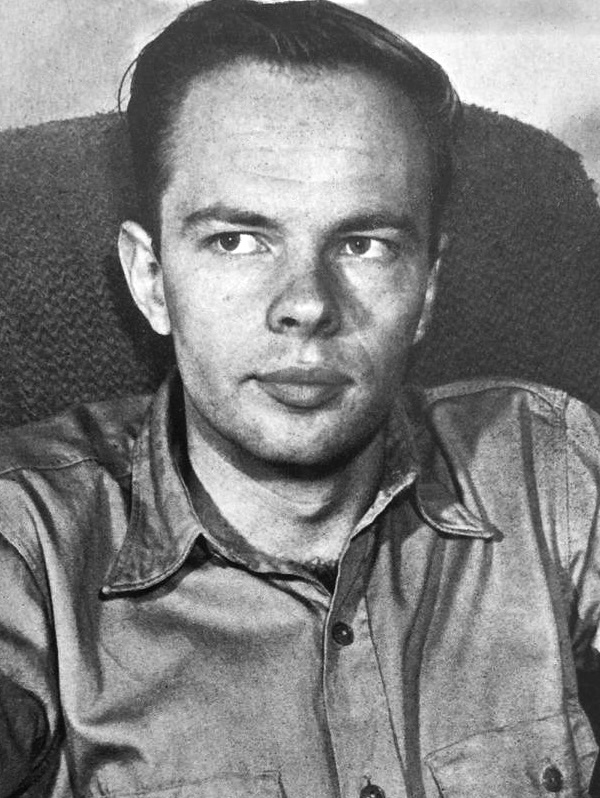
Philip K. Dick

- Elek Bakonyi, 78, Hungarian chess player
- Robert Begg, 67, Canadian physician, cancer researcher, and President of the University of Saskatchewan
- Philip K. Dick, 53, American author
- Ian Graham, 63, Scottish international rugby union player
- Donald Hardman, 83, senior Royal Air Force commander
- Haunani Kahalewai, 53, singer and entertainer known as the "First Lady of Song in Hawai‘i"
- Shiu Narayan Kanhai, 49, Indo-Fijian teacher, trade unionist and politician
- Djane Lavoie-Herz, 93, Canadian pianist and music educator
- Yoel Zussman, 71, Israeli jurist and the fourth President of the Supreme Court of Israel

=== 3 ===
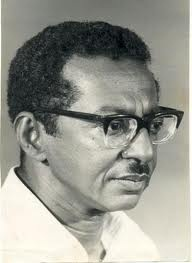
Muhammad al-Mahdi al-Majdhub

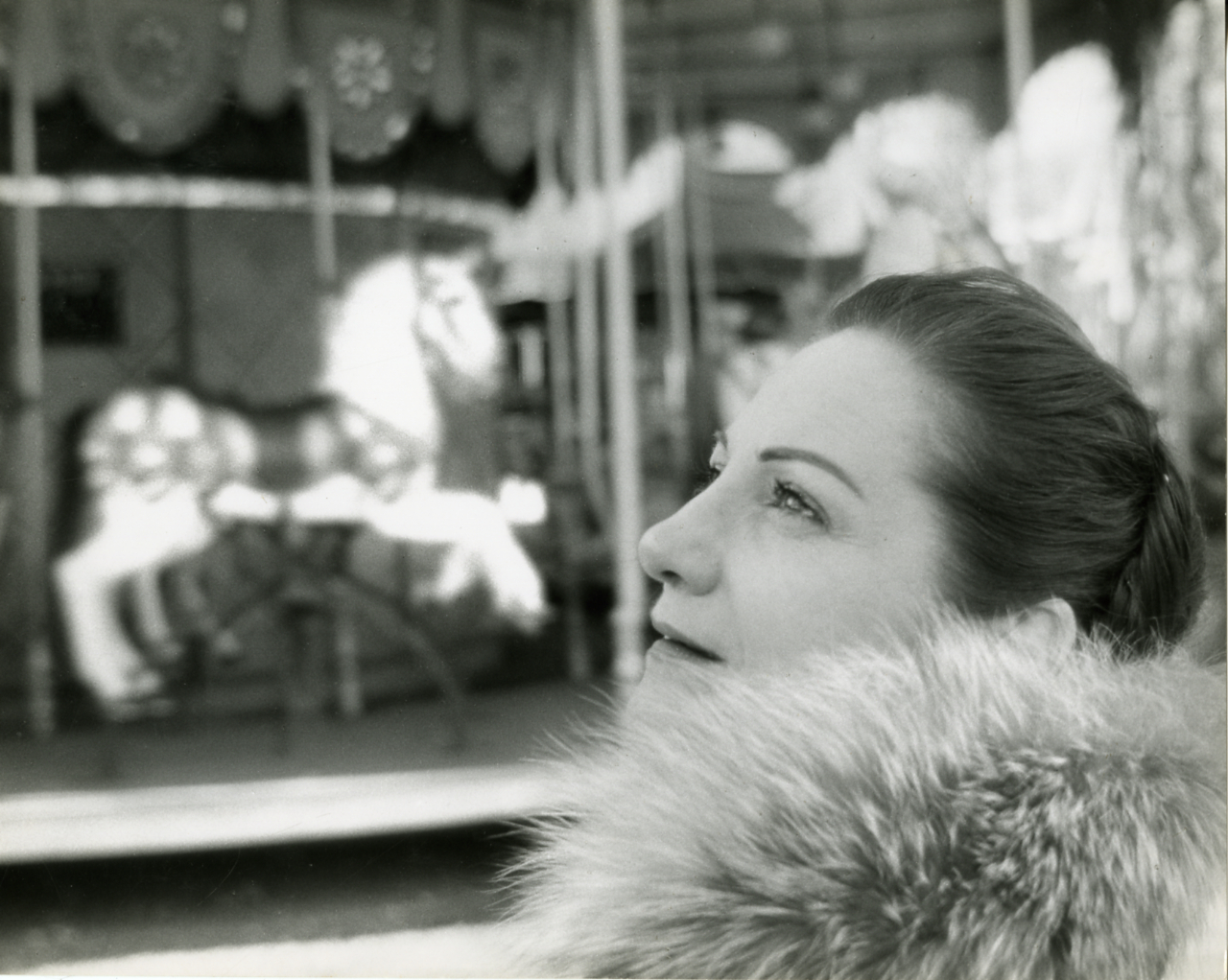
Sarah Ferrati

- Muhammad al-Mahdi al-Majdhub, 62 or 63, Sudanese poet
- Paul P. Boswell, 76, American politician and medical doctor
- Josef Bradl, 64, Austrian ski jumper
- Ivy Cavendish-Bentinck, Duchess of Portland, 94, Duchess of Portland from 1943 – 1977 and afterwards Dowager Duchess
- Neveille Colson, 79, state legislator in Texas
- Con Cottrell, 64, Irish hurler
- Mian Ehsan-ul-Haq, 76 or 77, Indian and Pakistani film producer and director
- Sekine Evren, 59, First Lady of Turkey
- Raymond O. Faulkner, 87, English Egyptologist and philologist of the ancient Egyptian language
- Sarah Ferrati, 72, Italian actress
- Firaq Gorakhpuri, 85, Indian writer, critic, and poet
- Cornelius Jadwin, 85, American equestrian
- Keshto Mukherjee, 56, Indian actor and comedian
- Dmitry Nalivkin, 92, Soviet geologist
- Georges Perec, 45, French novelist, filmmaker, documentalist, and essayist
- William Pollock, 82, American labor union leader
- Alan Villiers, 78, Australian writer, adventurer, photographer and mariner
- Lella Warren, 82, American novelist and short story writer
- Chavviram Singh Yadav, 41 or 42, Indian criminal

=== 4 ===
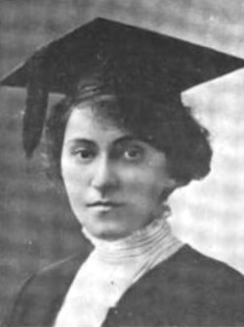
Ruth Edna Kelley

- Neli Niklsbacher Bregar, 69, Slovenian embroiderer, ethnologist, and author
- Edward V. Curry, 72, American politician from New York
- Bill DeWitt, 79, American professional baseball executive and club owner
- Dorothy Eden, 69, New Zealand novelist and short story writer
- Tadeusz Gede, 70, Polish electrical engineer, diplomat, and politician
- Jack Murphy Gordon, 51, United States district judge of the United States District Court for the Eastern District of Louisiana
- Pierpont M. Hamilton, 83, military officer in the United States Air Force
- Ruth Edna Kelley, 88, American author and librarian
- Douglas Kertland, 94, Canadian architect and athlete
- Mabel Pye, 87, Australian artist
- Dmitry Sukhovarov, 77, Soviet Army colonel
- João Tito, 58, Portuguese sailor and Olympian
- Søren Kristian Toubro, 76, Danish engineer
- Charles Winter, 78, English cricketer

=== 5 ===
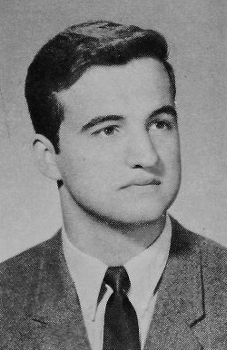
John Belushi

- John Belushi, 33, American comedian, actor and singer
- Clifford P. Case, 77, American lawyer and politician form New Jersey
- Sigi Denk, 31, Austrian cyclist and Olympian
- Ken Farmer, 71, Australian rules footballer
- Grahame Hall, 62, Australian rules footballer
- Bob Johnson, 70, English professional footballer, he played as a centre half
- Marie Lorraine, 83, Australian actress
- Burton Miller, 56, American costume and fashion designer
- Salah Nasr, 61, Egyptian spy and head of the Egyptian General Intelligence Directorate
- Giuseppe Porelli, 84, Italian actor
- Kōichi Taira, 72, Governor of Okinawa Prefecture
- Gertraud Winkelvoss, 65, German politician

=== 6 ===
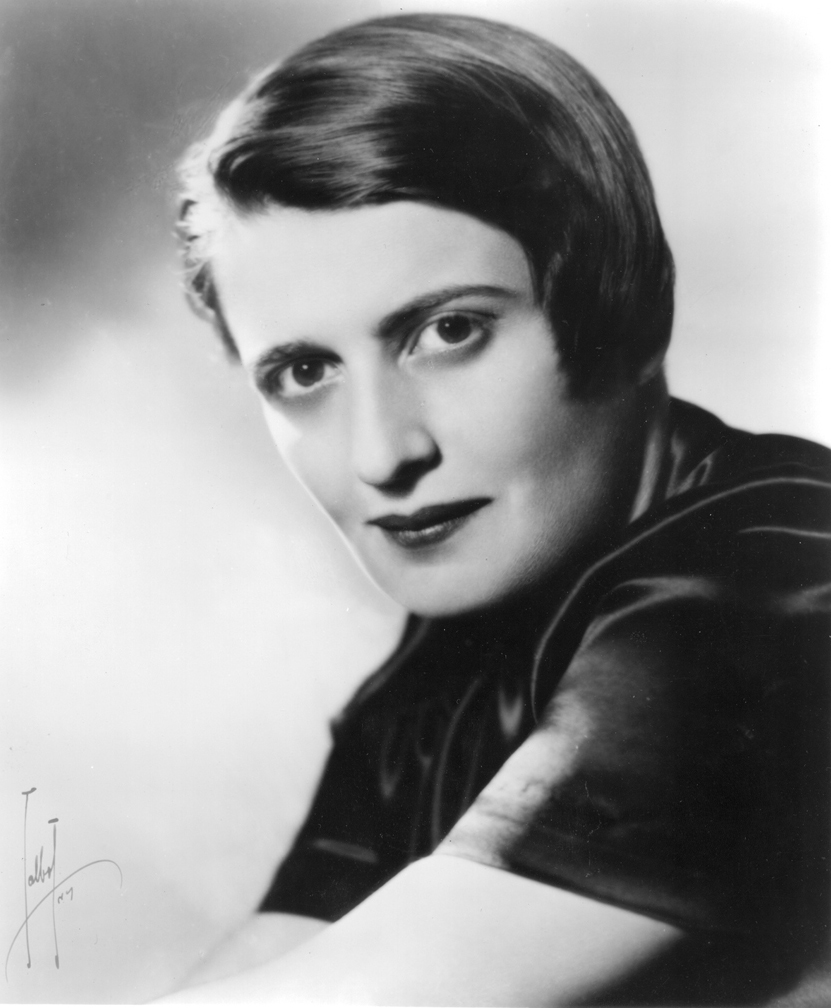
Ayn Rand

- Carmelino G. Alvendia, 75, justice of Court of Appeals of the Philippines
- Nikolay Belov, 90, Soviet and Russian geochemist
- James L. Connolly, Canadian politician
- Bert Harris, Australian wrestler and Olympian
- Bob Konovsky, 47, American professional football guard in the National Football League
- Rambhau Mhalgi, 60, Indian politician
- Ayn Rand, 77, Russian-born American author

=== 7 ===
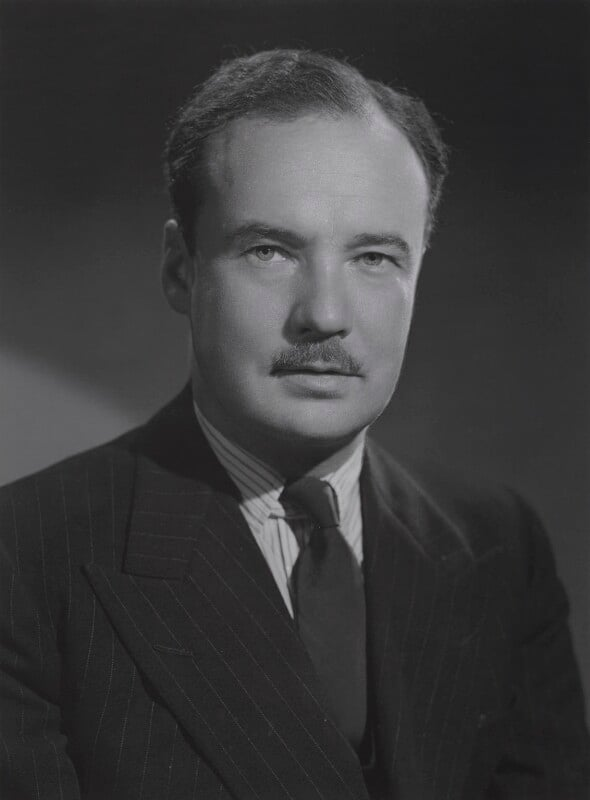
John Hare, 1st Viscount Blakenham

- Ida Barney, 95, American astronomer
- Walter Burdick, 88, American politician and farmer from Minnesota
- John Hare, 1st Viscount Blakenham, 71, British Conservative politician
- Charles Mills, 68, American composer
- Chuck Thompson, 55, American jazz drummer
- Otto von Bolschwing, German SS-Hauptsturmführer, 72, intelligence officer, and international businessman
- Tomás Wade, Argentine field hockey player
- Arthur Warwick, 73, British speedway rider
- Konrad Wolf, 56, East German film director
- Johann Wotapek, 73, Austrian athlete and Olympian

=== 8 ===
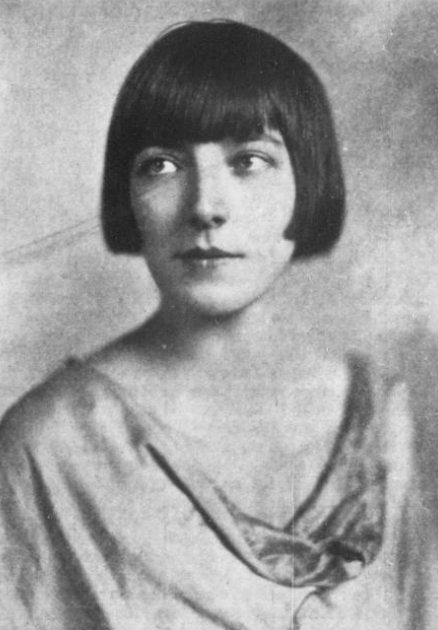
Anca Seidlova

- Mauritz Amundsen, 77, Norwegian Olympic sport shooter
- Margaret Barrington, 85, Irish writer and journalist
- Rab Butler, 79, British Conservative Party politician
- Mitchell Dahood, 60, American Jesuit priest, Hebraist, and Bible scholar.
- Ruby Diamond, 95, American businessperson and philanthropist
- Talmadge Hill, 79, American basketball and football coach
- Tom Hussey, 71, Major League Baseball announcer for the Boston Red Sox and Boston Braves
- Hatem Ali Jamadar, 109 or 110, Bengali politician
- Dot Laughton, 68, Australian cricketer
- Walter Plunkett, 79, American costume designer
- Anca Seidlova, 86, Czech-American pianist

=== 9 ===
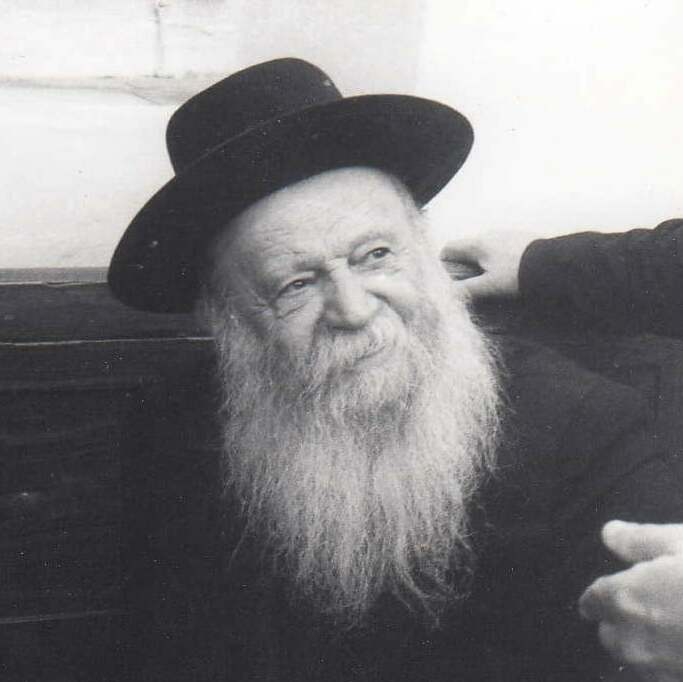
Zvi Yehuda Kook

- Isabel Dawson, 64, Canadian politician
- Brian Finlay, 54, New Zealand rugby union player
- Marguerite Grépon, 90, French journalist and writer
- Zvi Yehuda Kook, 90, Israeli Orthodox rabbi
- G. S. Melkote, 80, Indian freedom fighter, politician and parliamentarian
- Hedley Penny, 76, Welsh international table tennis player

=== 10 ===
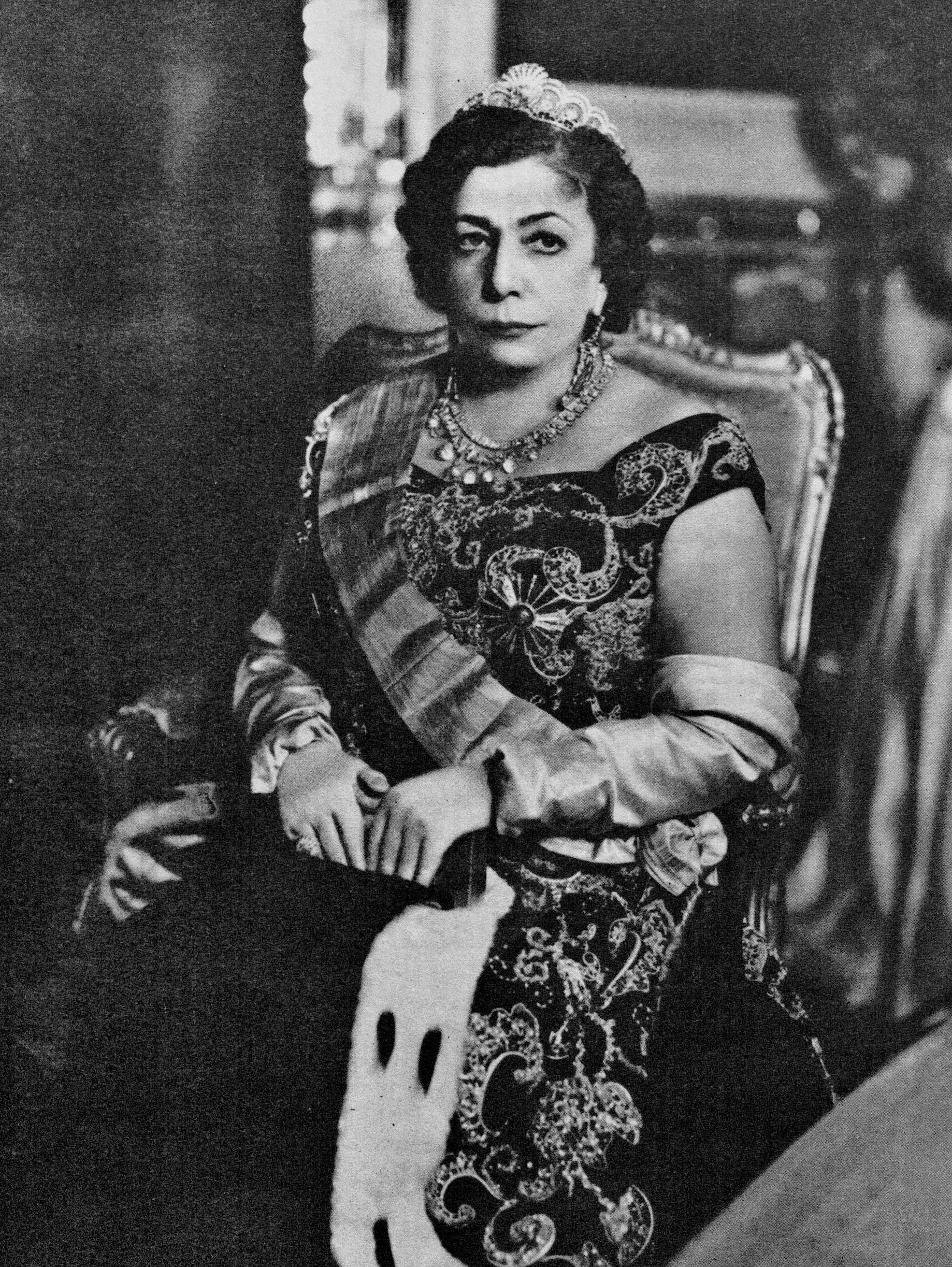
Tadj ol-Molouk

- Harry Carter, 80, English typographer
- Edward J. Garrett, 64, American business executive
- Joseph Ingolph Hetland, 85, American-born Canadian politician and farmer
- Austin Hogan, 80, Australian rules footballer
- Erik Larsson, 69, Swedish cross-country skier and Olympic medalist
- Lubomír Nácovský, 46, Czech sport shooter and Olympic bronze medalist
- Tadj ol-Molouk, 85, Queen of Iran
- Minoru Shirota, 82, Japanese microbiologist
- Milo Urban, 77, Slovak writer, translator, and journalist
- Leonid Utesov, 86, Soviet estrada singer, and comic actor

=== 11 ===
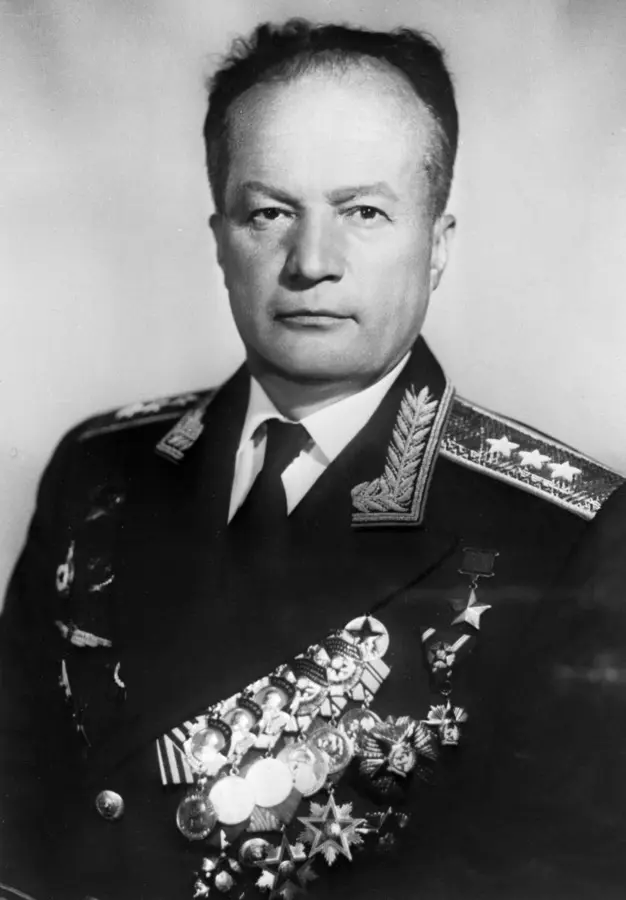
Nikolai Kamanin

- June Arnold, 55, American novelist and publisher
- Alan Byron, 45, Australian rules footballer
- S. A. Dissanayake, 68, Sri Lankan Inspector-General of Police
- Robert Franklin Gates, 75, American muralist, painter, printmaker, and art professor
- Horace Gregory, 83, American poet, translator of classic poetry, literary critic and college professor
- Fritz Heisler, 66, American football coach
- Nikolai Kamanin, 73, Soviet Air Force general
- Lewis Litster, 78, Australian cricketer
- Kiyo Murashima, 89, Japanese politician
- Rose Repetto, 74, Italian-born French business owner and shoe designer
- Torgil Thorén, 89, Swedish Navy officer

=== 12 ===
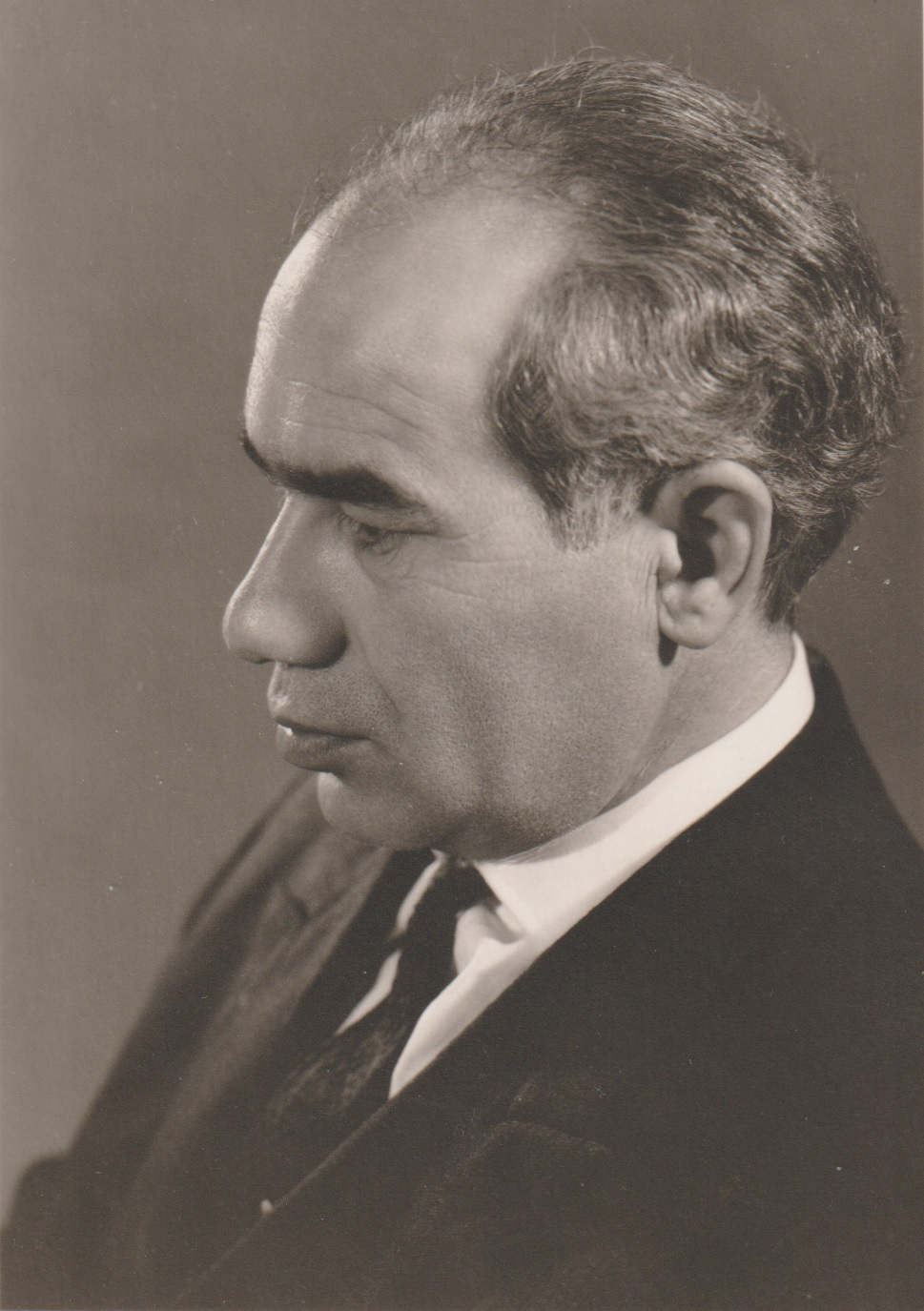
Levon Khachikyan

- Bill Andrus, 74, American Major League Baseball player
- Henry Arkell, 83, English first-class cricketer
- Louis Auriacombe, 65, French conductor
- Tanio Boccia, 70, Italian film director and screenwriter
- Levon Khachikyan, 63, Soviet Armenian historian and philologist
- Aleksander Kulisiewicz, 63, Polish singer, journalist and a political prisoner during the World War II occupation of Poland
- P.G. O'Dea, 83, Irish playwright
- Johan Wilhelm Rangell, 87, Prime Minister of Finland
- João da Silva, 36, Brazilian boxer
- Frederick Tees, 59, Royal Air Force airmen
- Dave "Fat Man" Williams, 61, American jazz, blues, and rhythm & blues pianist, bandleader, singer, and songwriter

=== 13 ===
- Aurél Bernáth, 86, Hungarian painter and art theorist
- A. Nagappa Chettiar, 66, Indian industrialist and one of the pioneers of the Indian leather industry
- Wilfred Hawker, 26, Surinamese military officer who was executed for treason
- Felix Morley, 88, American Pulitzer Prize-winning journalist and college administrator
- Pete Sanstol, 76, Norwegian-American professional boxer

=== 14 ===
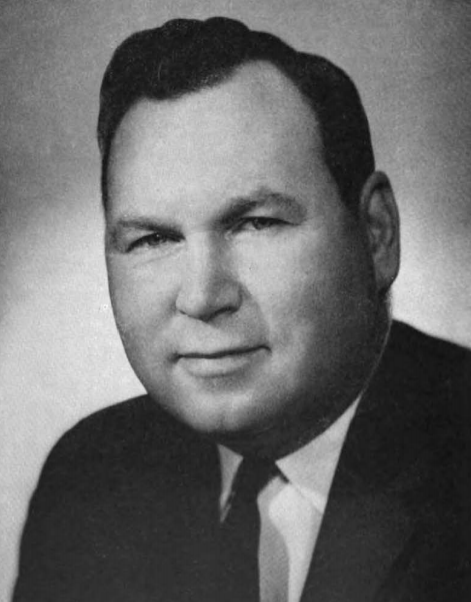
Robert W. Mattson Sr.

- Caine 1, 24, American graffiti artist
- Tom Carlyon, 79, Australian rules footballer
- Robert Eberan von Eberhorst, 79, Austrian engineer
- Alfred Fairbank, 86, British calligrapher, palaeographer and author on handwriting
- Hansjörg Farbmacher, 41, Austrian skier
- Gyula Kádár, 83, Hungarian military officer
- Anna Leporskaya, 82, Soviet avant-garde artist
- Robert W. Mattson Sr., 57, American army veteran, lawyer, and politician in Minnesota
- John McNeill, 82, Crown Advocate of the British Supreme Court for China
- Kirill Molchanov, 59, Russian and Soviet composer
- Claude Ernest Pert, 83, senior cavalry officer in the British Indian Army, and British India polo champion

=== 15 ===
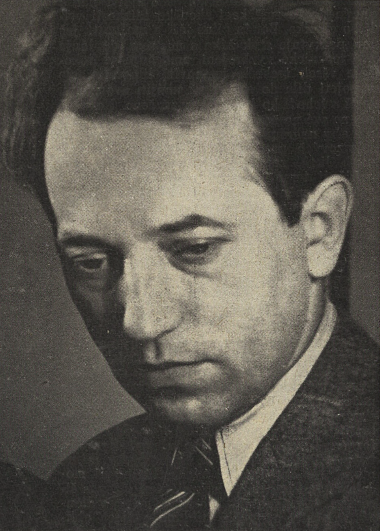
Vladimír Šmeral

- Turpin Bannister, 77, American architectural historian
- Thomas Cossitt, 58, Canadian politician
- Fred McEvoy, 68, Australian rules footballer
- Eddie Mulligan, 87, American professional baseball player
- Edgell Rickword, 83, English poet, critic, journalist and literary editor
- Vladimír Šmeral, 78, Czech actor
- Elis Wiklund, 72, Swedish skier and Olympian

=== 16 ===
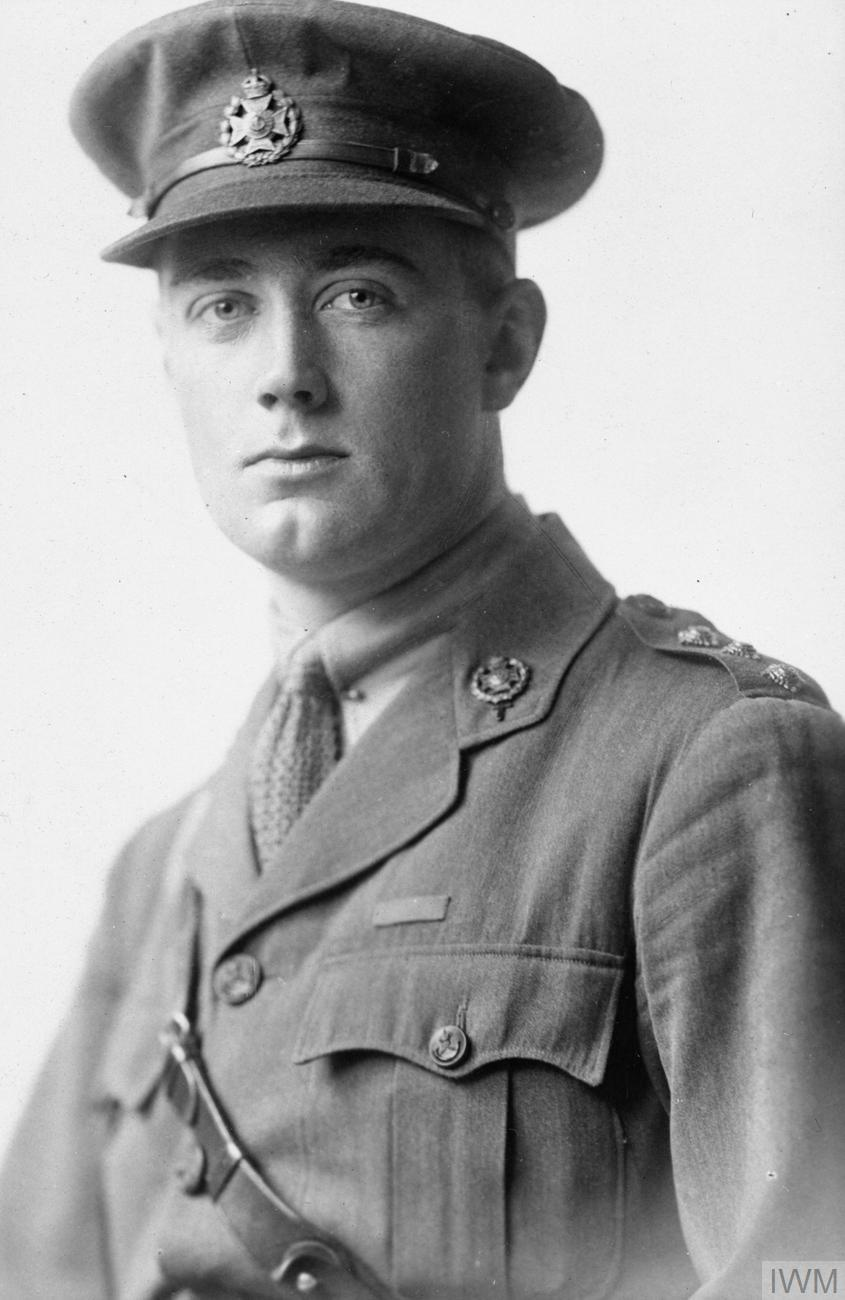
Geoffrey Vickers

- Veniamin Beylin, 77, Red Army major general
- Syed Nasir Ismail, 61, Speaker of the Dewan Rakyat
- Veljo Käsper, 51, Estonian film director and screenwriter
- Walter Rangeley, 78, English track and field athlete
- Henry J. Rosner, 73, American policy researcher, journalist, and fiscal administrator for public welfare programs in New York City and New York State
- Geoffrey Vickers, 87, English lawyer, administrator, writer and pioneering systems scientist
- Merv Wickham, 68, Australian rules footballer
- Henry Seiler Wise, 72, American judge

=== 17 ===
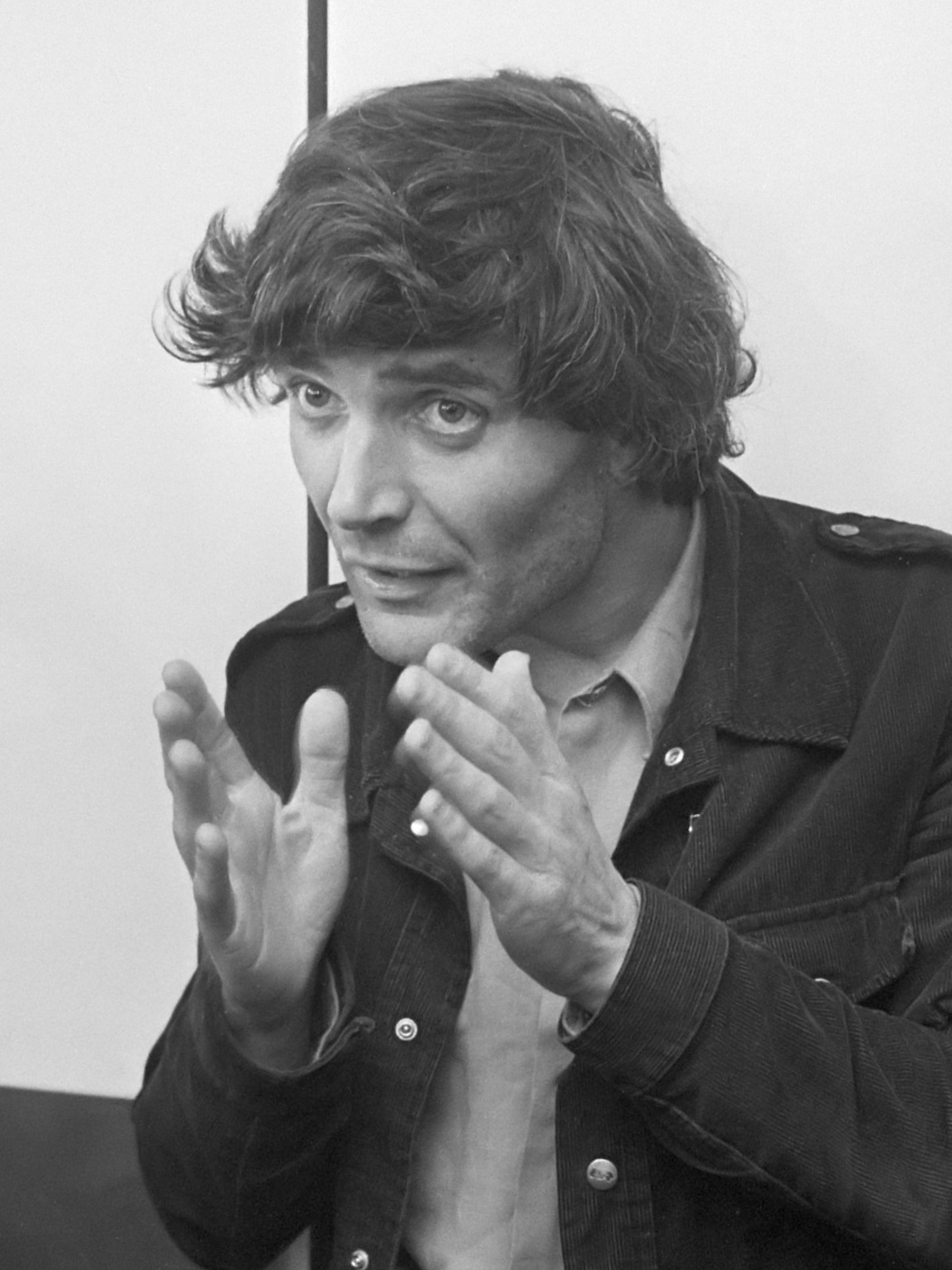
Koos Koster

- John Crouse, 75, American special effects artist and cameraman
- Lunie Danage, 86, American baseball player
- Sam George, 40, lead singer and drummer of The Capitols
- Herb Graham, 70, Australian politician
- Earl Honaman, 77, American Episcopal bishop
- Koos Koster, 46, Dutch journalist
- Francis Moorehouse, 58, American labor relations specialist

=== 18 ===
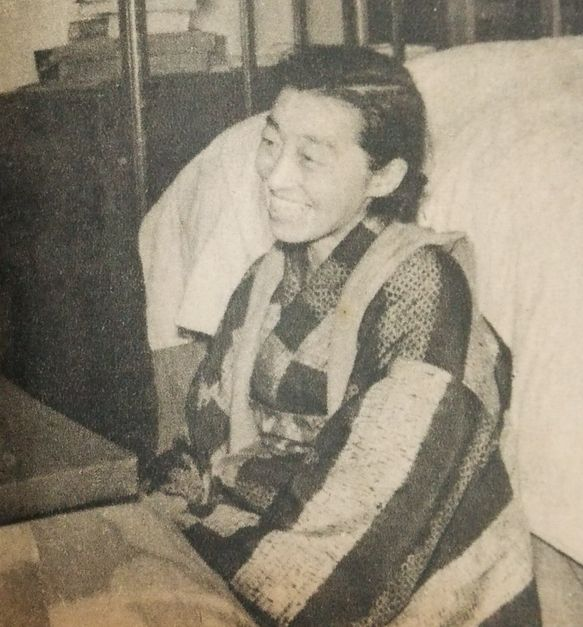
Yao Kitabatake

- Vasily Chuikov, 82, Marshal of the Soviet Union during WWII
- Theo Fitzau, 59, German racing driver
- Yao Kitabatake, 78, Japanese children's writer
- George More O'Ferrall, 74, British film and television producer, director, and actor
- Charles Rampelberg, 72, French cyclist
- Patrick Smith, Irish Fianna Fáil party politician
- Rolf Steffenburg, 96, Swedish sailor and Olympian
- Barbara Tennant, 89, English actress
- Eddie Thompson, 75, English cricketer
- Lawrence Wackett, 86, Royal Australian Air Force official and fellow of the Royal Aeronautical Society

=== 19 ===
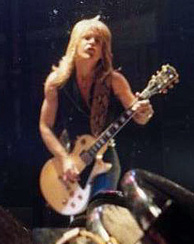
Randy Rhoads

- Alan Badel, 58, English actor
- J. B. Kripalani, 93, Indian politician
- William C. Lambert, 87, American fighter pilot who flew in World War I
- Bertie Lorraine, 69, Scotland international rugby union player
- Hidemitsu Nakano, 91, general in the Imperial Japanese Army
- Enni Rekola, 72, Finnish actress
- Randy Rhoads, 25, American guitarist
- Ben Scharnus, 64, American professional basketball player
- Nakina Smith, 68, Canadian ice hockey player
- Christopher Joseph Weldon, 76, American prelate of the Roman Catholic Church

=== 20 ===
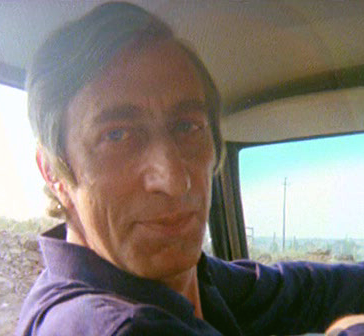
Marco Tulli

- Jo Copeland, 84, American fashion designer
- Roy Fox, 80, American-born British dance bandleader
- Émile Girardin, 86 or 87, Canadian businessman and president of Mouvement Desjardins
- Salvador Molina, 67, Spanish racing cyclist
- Bally Prell, 59, German singer and humorist
- Billie Seward, 69, American actress
- Marietta Shaginyan, 93, Soviet writer, historian of Armenian descent
- Marco Tulli, 61, Italian actor

=== 21 ===
- Harry H. Corbett, 57, English actor and comedian
- Mazlum Doğan, 23 or 24, journalist and a founding member of the Kurdistan Workers' Party
- Aleksandr Faintsimmer, 75, Soviet film director
- Terry Gilroy, 80, New Zealand rugby player
- Kenneth Jackson, 68, Scottish first-class cricketer and international rugby union player
- Marjorie Pollard, 82, English field hockey player
- Ollie Sax, 77, American Major League Baseball player
- Harlal Singh, 81, Indian politician
- Raymond Talleux, 81, French rower who competed in the 1924 Summer Olympics
- Helena Rosa Wright, 94, English pioneer and influential figure in birth control and family planning

=== 22 ===
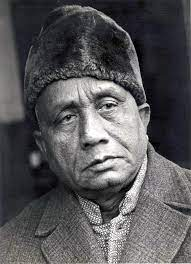
Ehsan Danish

- Ehsan Danish, 68, Urdu poet, prose writer, linguist, lexicographer and scholar from Pakistan
- Nicolas Farkas, 91, Hungarian-born cinematographer, screenwriter, producer and film director
- Pericle Felici, 70, Italian Roman Catholic cardinal
- Bob Foster, 71, British motorcyclist
- Harold Goldblatt, 82, British actor, theatre director and theatre producer
- Tex Palmer, 77, American film and television actor
- Buddy Parker, 68, American football player and coach
- Arthur W. Thomas, 90, American professor and chemist who specialized in colloid chemistry

=== 23 ===
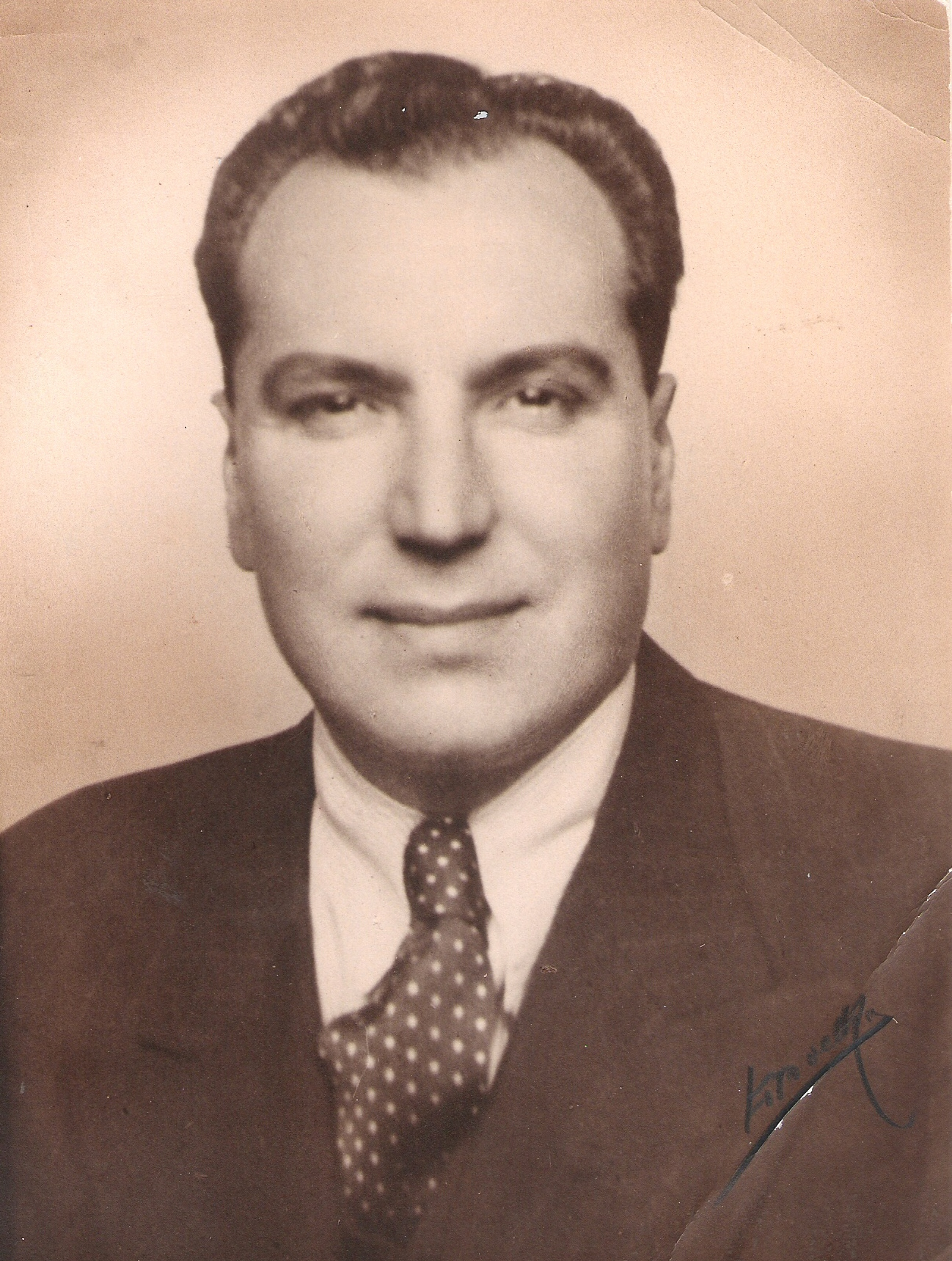
Alejandro Serani Burgos

- Syd Desireau, 83, Canadian professional ice hockey player
- Benjamin Feingold, 82, American pediatric allergist
- Robert Flacelière, 77, French scholar of Classical Greek
- Sonny Greer, 86, American jazz drummer and vocalist
- Jack Hagerty, 78, American football player, coach and college athletics administrator
- Alice Leopold, 75, American politician, social activist, and government official
- Mario Praz, 85, Italian critic of art and literature, and a scholar of English literature
- Alejandro Serani Burgos, 80, Chilean lawyer and politician

=== 24 ===
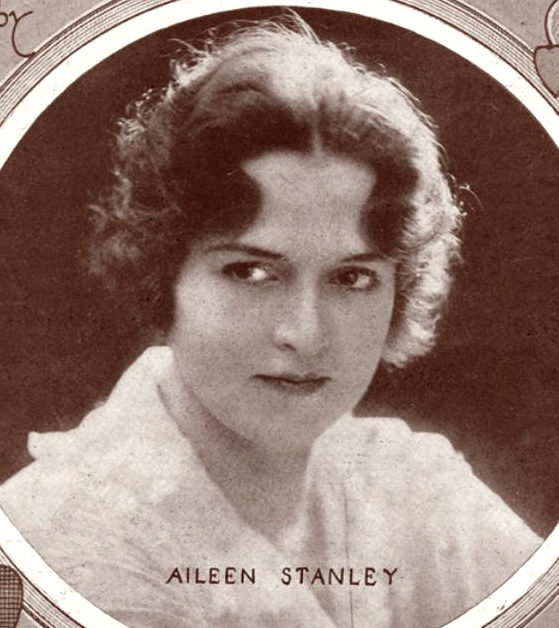
Aileen Stanley

- Clair Alan Brown, 78, American botanist
- Igor Gorin, 77, Ukrainian Jewish baritone and music teacher
- Ken Harris, 83, American animator
- Peter Heier, 86, Roman Catholic priest
- Howard Meyerhoff, 82, American geologist
- Lancelot Perowne, 79, British Army officer who commanded the 17th Gurkha Division during the Malayan Emergency
- Aileen Stanley, 89, American singer

=== 25 ===
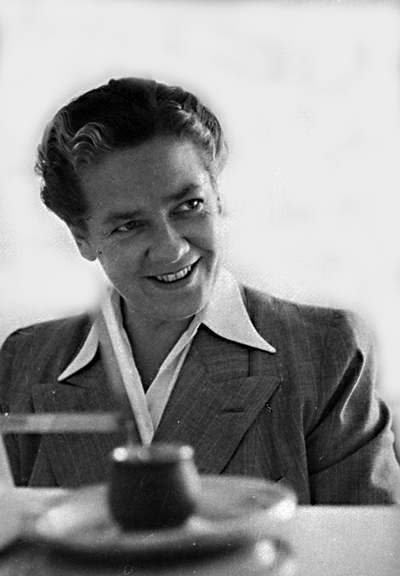
Kai Gullmar

- Goodman Ace, 83, American actor, comedian and writer
- Percy Bentley, 75, Australian rules footballer
- Ademar Caballero, 53, Olympic backstroke swimmer from Brazil
- Marie-Agnès Cailliau, 92, French Resistance fighter and the older sister of Charles de Gaulle
- Harold DeMarsh, 80, American wrestler
- Carlos Falt, 68, Spanish water polo player and Olympian
- Kai Gullmar, 76, Swedish composer, musician, singer and actress
- Thomas Lionel Hodgkin, 71, English Marxist historian of Africa
- Chester Hougen, 74, American politician
- Mardan Musayev, 75, Azerbaijani Red Army senior sergeant and a Hero of the Soviet Union
- Elizabeth Stanton, 72, Massachusetts politician
- Rufus P. Turner, 74, American academic, engineer, and author who published on semiconductor devices, technical writing style, and poet-novelist

=== 26 ===
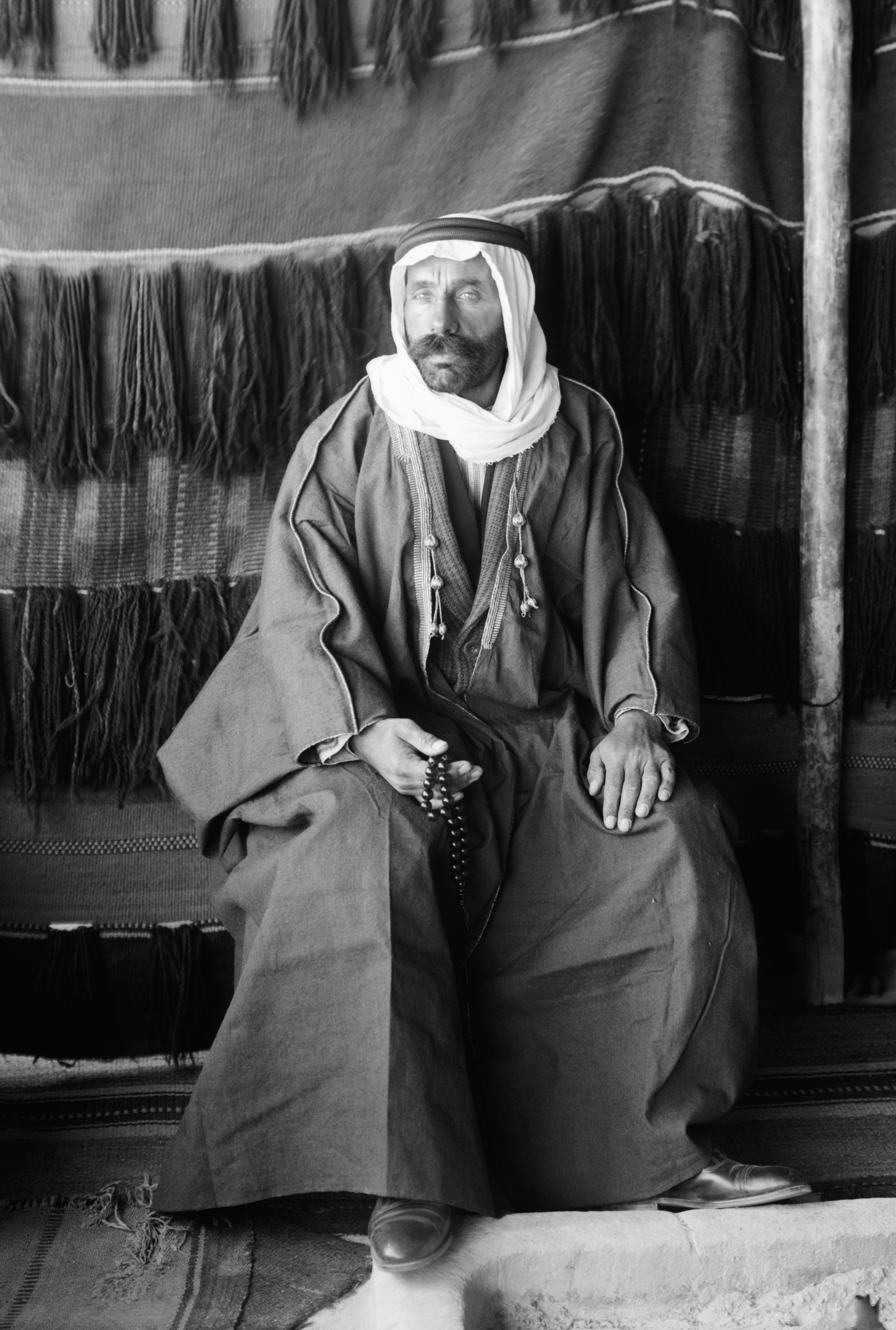
Sultan al-Atrash

- Sultan al-Atrash, 91, Syrian nationalist and general
- Hendrika Bante, 80, Dutch diver
- Herbert Stephenson Boreman, 84, American judge
- Otis Boykin, 61, American inventor and engineer
- Liana Del Balzo, 83, Italian film actress
- Ferdinando Garimberti, 88, Italian violin maker
- F. E. Halliday, 79, English academic, author and amateur painter
- Margaret H'Doubler, 92, American dance educator
- Filip Hjulström, 79, Swedish geographer
- Johann Heinrich Höhl, 77, German painter
- Mary Ingraham, 80, Bahamian suffragist and the founding president of the Bahamas Women's Suffrage Movement
- Reino Kuivamäki, 63, Finnish track and field athlete
- Sam Kydd, 67, Irish-born English actor
- Jack Malloch, 61, South African-born Rhodesian bush pilot, gun-runner, and WWII flying ace for Britain
- Shigeru Mizuhara, 73, Japanese professional baseball infielder and manager
- Henriëtte Laman Trip-de Beaufort, 91, Dutch writer

=== 27 ===
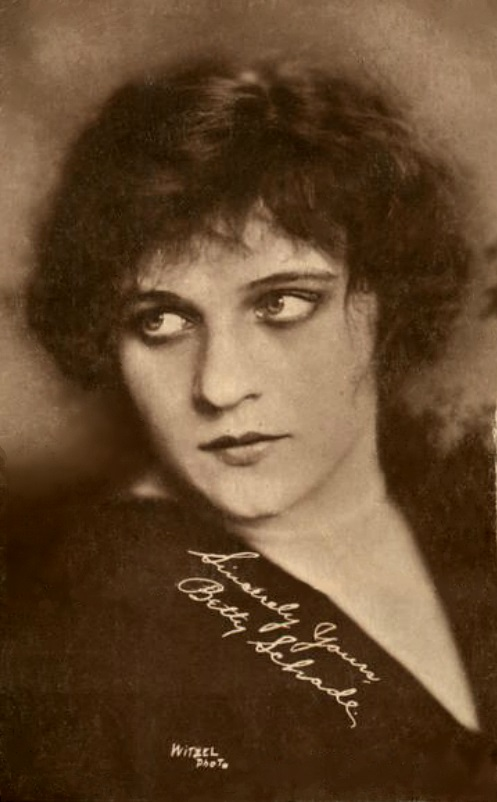
Betty Schade

- Harriet Adams, 89, American juvenile book packager, children's novelist, and publisher
- Michael Hindelang, 36, American criminologist
- Cyril Hutchens, 78, Australian politician
- Shiu Narayan Kanhai, 49, Indo-Fijian teacher, trade unionist and politician
- Fazlur Rahman Khan, 52, Bangladeshi-born American architect
- Ted Lewis, 42, British writer known for his crime fiction
- Betty Schade, 87, German-born American actress
- Hubert Schiffer, 57, German priest and survivor of the bombing of Hiroshima
- Lini De Vries, 76, Dutch–American author, public health nurse, and teacher
- Bob Ysaguirre, 85, Belizean-born American jazz double bass and tuba player

=== 28 ===
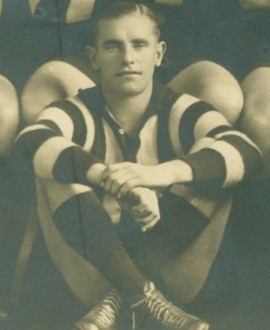
Jack Carmody

- Bill Adkins, 93, Canadian noted for his work in theatre
- Fernando Alessandri, 84, Chilean political figure
- Rex Alexander, 57, American college basketball coach
- Jack Carmody, 70, Australian rules footballer
- William Giauque, 86, Canadian chemist, Nobel Prize laureate
- Boris Kotlyarov, 68, Soviet ethnomusicologist, violinist and pedagogue
- Esteban Muruetagoiena, 38, Spanish physician
- Dave Sheridan, 38, American cartoonist
- Harold Uris, 76, American real estate entrepreneur and philanthropist

=== 29 ===
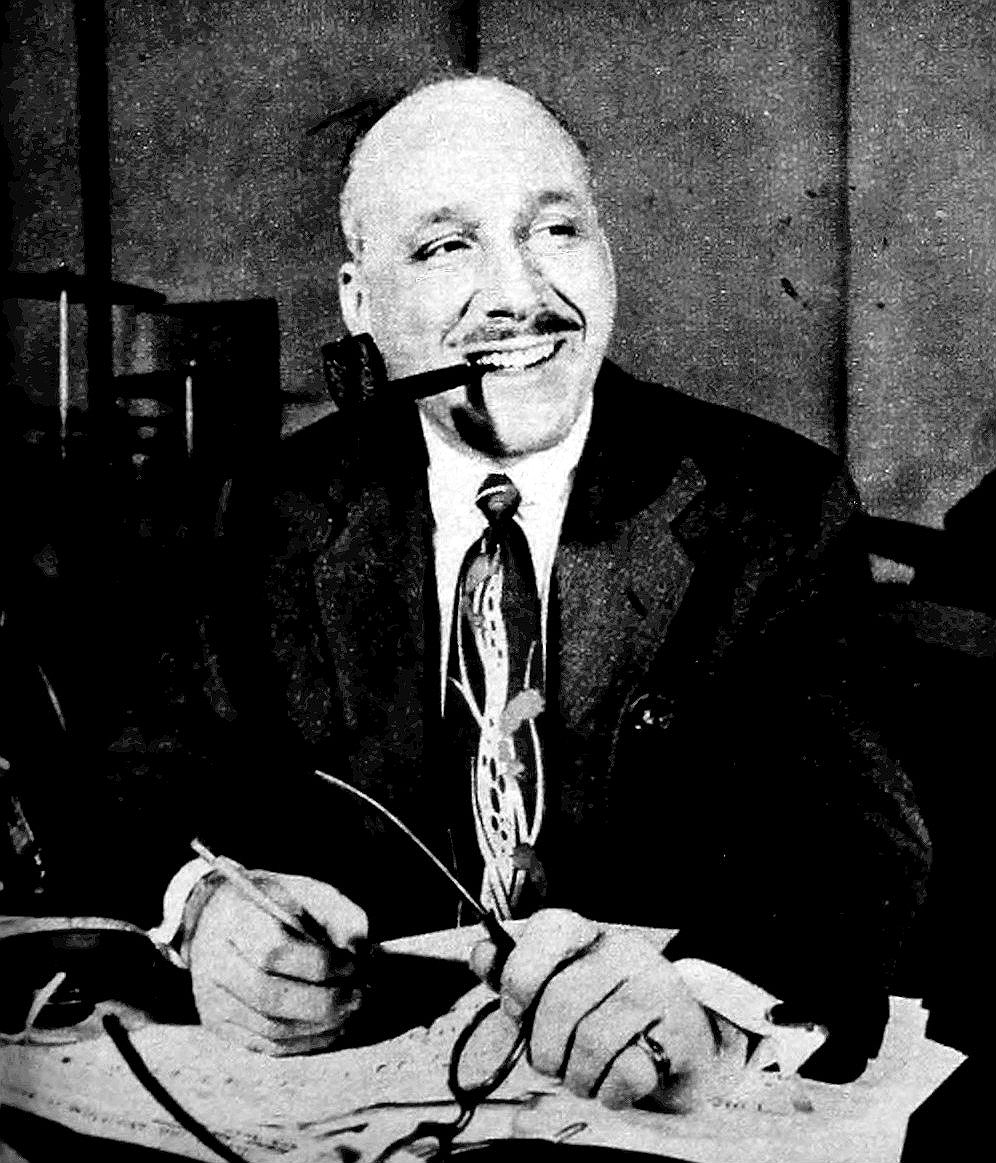
Ray Bloch

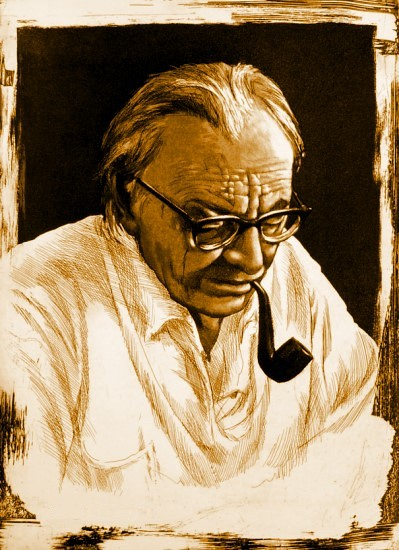
Carl Orff

- Karl Aasland, 63, Norwegian politician
- William M. Blair, 97, American investment banker from Chicago
- Ray Bloch, 79, American composer, songwriter, conductor, pianist, author and arranger
- Rudy Bond, 69, American actor
- Jack Chalmers, 88, New Zealand-born Australian exchange recipient of the George Cross
- Helene Deutsch, 97, Polish-American psychoanalyst
- Fatty George, 54, Austrian jazz clarinettist
- Walter Hallstein, 80, German diplomat, 1st President of the European Commission
- Hector Heusghem, 92, Belgian cyclist
- Curt Kosswig, 78, German zoologist and geneticist
- Indalecio Liévano, 64, Colombian politician and diplomat
- Frederick George Mann, 84, British organic chemist
- H. Selby Msimang, 95, South African political leader and activist
- Carl Orff, 86, German composer
- Floyd Smith, musician, 65, American jazz guitarist and record producer
- C. Ferdinand Sybert, 81, American lawyer who served as Attorney General of Maryland
- Charles Allen Thomas, 82, American chemist and businessman
- Nathan F. Twining, 84, United States Air Force general
- Marlene Willis, 40, American actress

=== 30 ===
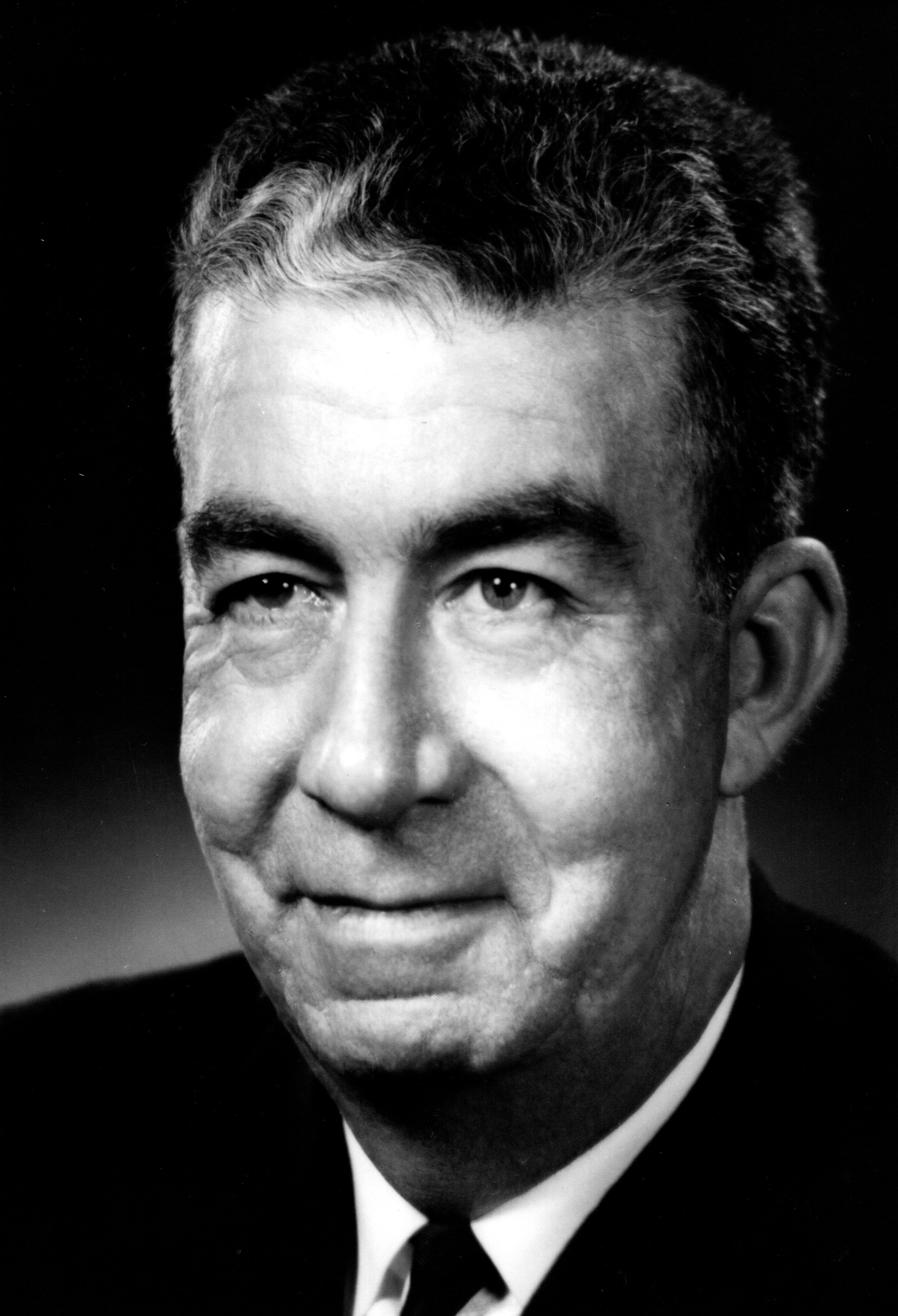
Barry Mather

- Henry David Aiken, 69, American ethicist, philosopher and academic
- Hassan al-Hakim, 95 or 96, Prime Minister of Syria
- Theodore E. Cummings, 74, Austrian-born American diplomat
- Fritz Eberhard, 85, German journalist and member of the German Resistance against Nazism
- Armando Filiput, 58, Italian hurdler
- Sergio Grieco, 65, Italian film director and screenwriter
- Violet King Henry, 52, Canadian lawyer and activist
- Agnes Newton Keith, 80, American writer
- Frank Lee, 76, English first-class cricketer
- Barry Mather, 73, Canadian journalist, columnist, and politician
- Tom McHale, 40, American novelist
- Roger Pelé, 80, French long-distance runner and Olympian
- Scovel Richardson, American judge of the United States Customs Court and the United States Court of International Trade who was one of the first Black Federal judges in the United States
- Justinian Rweyemamu, 40, Tanzania’s first major economics scholar
- Andrew Schulze, 86, American Lutheran clergyman, civil rights activist, and author
- Ruggero Tomaselli, 61, Italian botanist

=== 31 ===
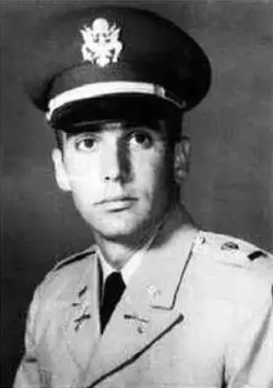
Rafael Villaverde

- Joe Dundee, 78, Italian-born American boxer
- Léon Fourneau, 82, Belgian middle-distance runner and Olympian
- Miles Hadfield, 78, English writer on gardening
- Pone Kingpetch, 47, Thai professional boxer
- Georgios Poniridis, 90, Greek composer, conductor, and violinist
- René Richard, 86, Swiss-born Canadian painter
- Ralph L. Ropp, 85, academic and 11th president of Louisiana Tech University
- Rafael Villaverde, 40, Cuban-born American CIA agent and military officer
