= Diddle (disambiguation) =

A diddle is a type of drum rudiment.

Diddle may also refer to:

== People with the surname ==
- Edgar Diddle (1895–1970), American college men's basketball coach
- W. H. Diddle (1882–1985), American amateur golfer and golf course designer

== See also ==
- Diddl, a German cartoon character
- Diddler (disambiguation)
- Diddling, a form of traditional singing in England and Scotland, more generally known as lilting
- Hey Diddle Diddle (disambiguation)
