= Diddler =

Diddler may refer to:

- Sean Combs (born 1969; also called "The Diddler"), U.S. rapper also variously known as "Puff Daddy", "P Diddy", "Diddy", "Puffy", and variations
- Diddlers, trolleybuses operated by London United Tramways
- The Diddlers, a Bo Diddley bop cover band; see The Horrors
- "The Diddler", a 2013 song by Flying Lotus off of ideas+drafts+loops
- The Diddler, a 1960 play by P.G. O'Dea
- a person who engages in diddling (slang for child molestation); a child molester

== Fictional characters ==
- Jeremy Diddler, a 19th-century fictional character that became a stock character, the origin of the word "diddle"
- The Diddler, a supervillain created by Kevin Smith for the comic Bluntman and Chronic
- The Diddler, a supervillain character from the turn-of-the-millennium BBC educational TV show Megamaths
- The Diddler, a fictional character from the 2000s TV game show Most Extreme Elimination Challenge
- Diddler, a fictional character from the 1986 film Pirates
- Diddler, a fictional character from the 1992 film Bloodfist III: Forced to Fight
- The Diddler, a fictional character from The Simpsons, an alter-ego of Ned Flanders; see Riddler in other media

== See also ==
- The dictionary definition of diddle at Wiktionary
- "Diddler on the Roof", from Saturday Night Live; see Recurring Saturday Night Live characters and sketches introduced 2017–18
- P Diddler And The Fearsome Foursome, a U.S. punk rock band
- Diddle (disambiguation)
