= Patrick O'Dea =

Patrick O'Dea may refer to:

- Patrick O'Dea (public servant) (1917–2010), New Zealand public servant
- Pat O'Dea (Patrick John O'Dea, 1872–1962), Australian rules and American football player
- P.G. O'Dea (1898 – 1982), (Patrick Gerard) Irish playwright known for his comedic plays and contributions to Irish theatre
