= Camille Decreus =

French composer and pianist

Camille Léo Ernest Decreus
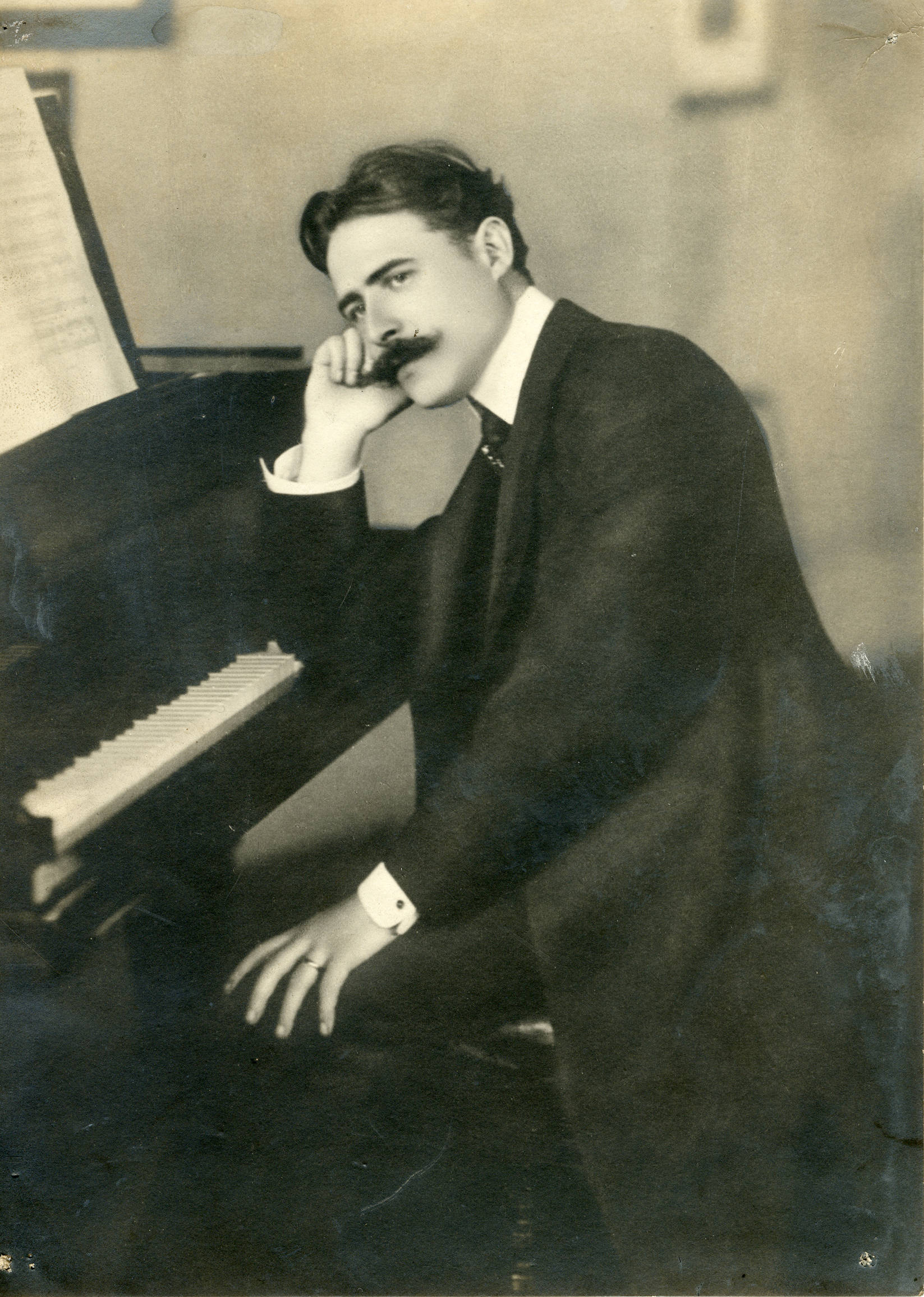

Background information
- Also known as: Camille DeCreus, Camille de Creus
- Born: 23 September 1876; Paris
- Died: 26 September 1939 Fontainebleau
- Occupations: Composer and pianist

Camille Léo Ernest Decreus (sometimes spelt as "Camille DeCreus" or "Camille de Creus") (23 September 1876 – 26 September 1939) was a French composer and pianist.

== Biography ==
Decreus was born in Paris and studied with Raoul Pugno at the Paris Conservatory.

He married the talented violinist Renée Chemet on 20 May 1906. This year also marked his solo debut. Since then, he was mainly known as a piano accompanist for other musicians in Europe and America, including his wife and the violinist Eugène Ysaÿe.

Decreus became Director of the American Conservatory in Fontainebleau in or before 1924. During the years at the American Conservatory, many musicians have benefitted from his teaching, including Jane Pickens Hoving, Jane Hobson, Ulvi Cemal Erkin, Humberto Viscarra Monje, Evangeline Marie Lehman and others.

== Musical works ==
As a composer, Decreus is today forgotten. Only about ten short vocal pieces with piano accompaniment or piano solo pieces are attributed as Decreus's compositions. No recordings for any of Decreus's work exist, although information about live performance of his work can be found.

A number of composers dedicated works to Decreus, including:

- Godowsky's concert transcription of Chopin's Waltz Op. 69 No. 1,
- Le Moustique, Op. 66 by Mel Bonis
