= Renée Chemet =

French violinist (1887–1977)

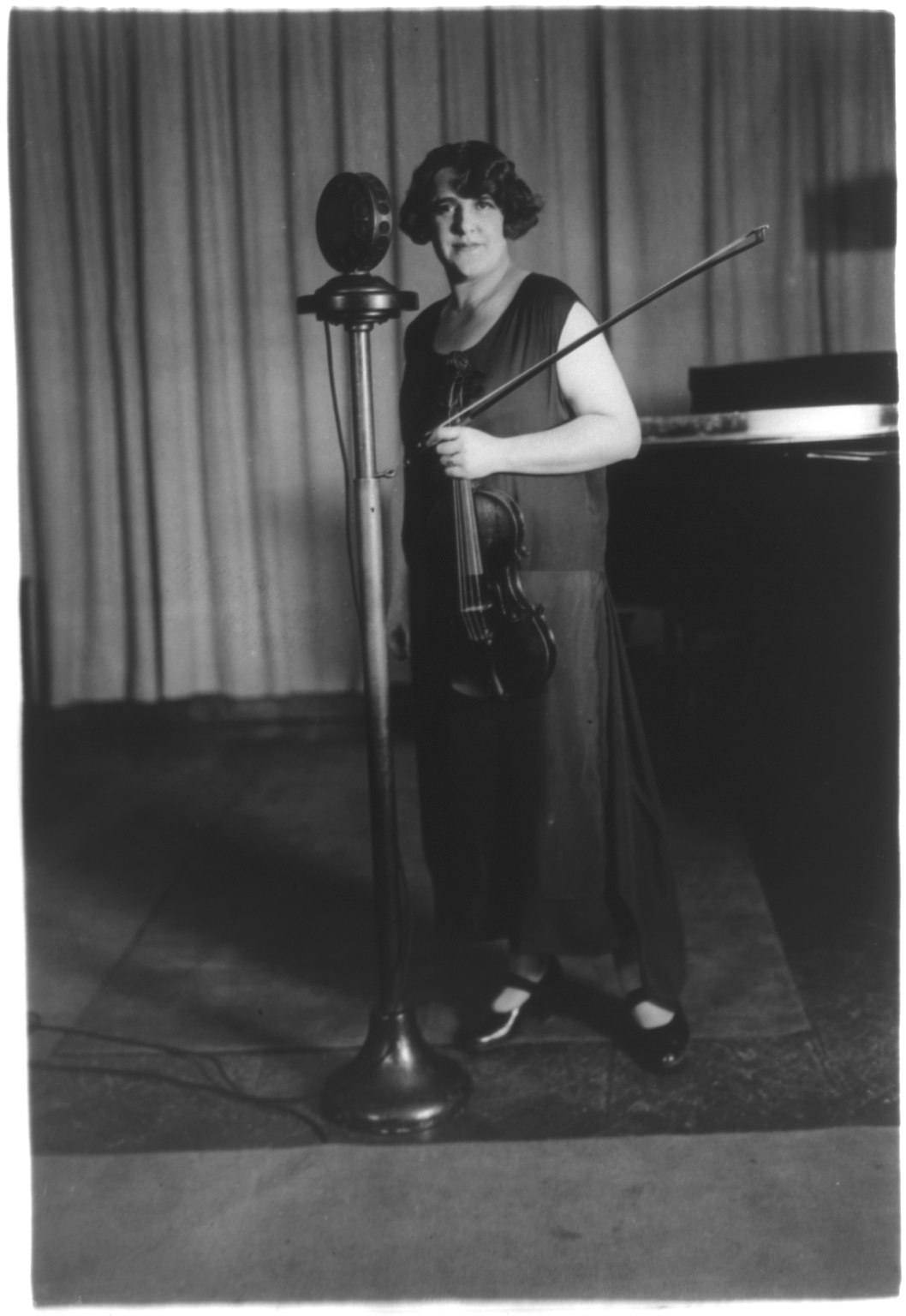
- Renée Chemet standing at a microphone, from the George Grantham Bain Collection, Library of Congress.
- Born: Renée Henriette Joséphine Chemet; 9 January 1887; Boulogne-sur-Seine
- Died: 2 January 1977 (aged 89); Paris
- Other name: Renée Chemet-Decreus (after marriage)
- Education: Conservatoire de Paris
- Occupation: violinist
- Spouse: Camille Decreus

Renée Chemet (9 January 1887 – 2 January 1977) was a French violinist.

== Early life ==
Renée Henriette Joséphine Chemet was born in Boulogne-sur-Seine. She studied with Henri Berthelier at the Conservatoire de Paris, graduating in 1902.

== Career ==
Chemet toured the world as a violinist for decades, playing a violin made by Giovanni Battista Guadagnini. In 1904, still a teenager, she was a soloist at the Proms concerts in London, under conductor Henry Wood. In 1907, she toured North America as a violinist with her husband, pianist Camille Decreus, in the company of Emma Calvé. "Madame Chemet is a violinist of great talent", explained a reviewer who heard her in Hamburg in 1911, "with great skill, splendid technique, and big (rather manly) tone. Her style of playing is eminently French; she sometimes overdoes it by forcing sentiment and cantilène."

During World War I, when travel was difficult, she gave benefit concerts and performed for the troops in France, and worked as a nurse's aide; she was awarded the Legion of Honour for her service.

After the war, Chemet was a soloist in Liverpool, Birmingham, Nottingham, Bradford, Cardiff, Edinburgh, and Glasgow in 1920. In the latter half of 1920, Chemet gave a number of joint recitals with the Russian tenor Vladimir Rosing. In New York, she played at Carnegie Hall in 1921, at Aeolian Hall in 1923, Town Hall in 1927, and at the Metropolitan Opera House in 1925 and 1928. Throughout the 1920s, she made many recordings, and appeared regularly on radio. "Radio paves the way," she told a New York Times interviewer in 1930. "It popularizes tunes, the great symphony orchestras, the talented singers and instrumental soloists that would be ignored without this medium." She played Maud Powell's violin on the radio in New York in 1925.

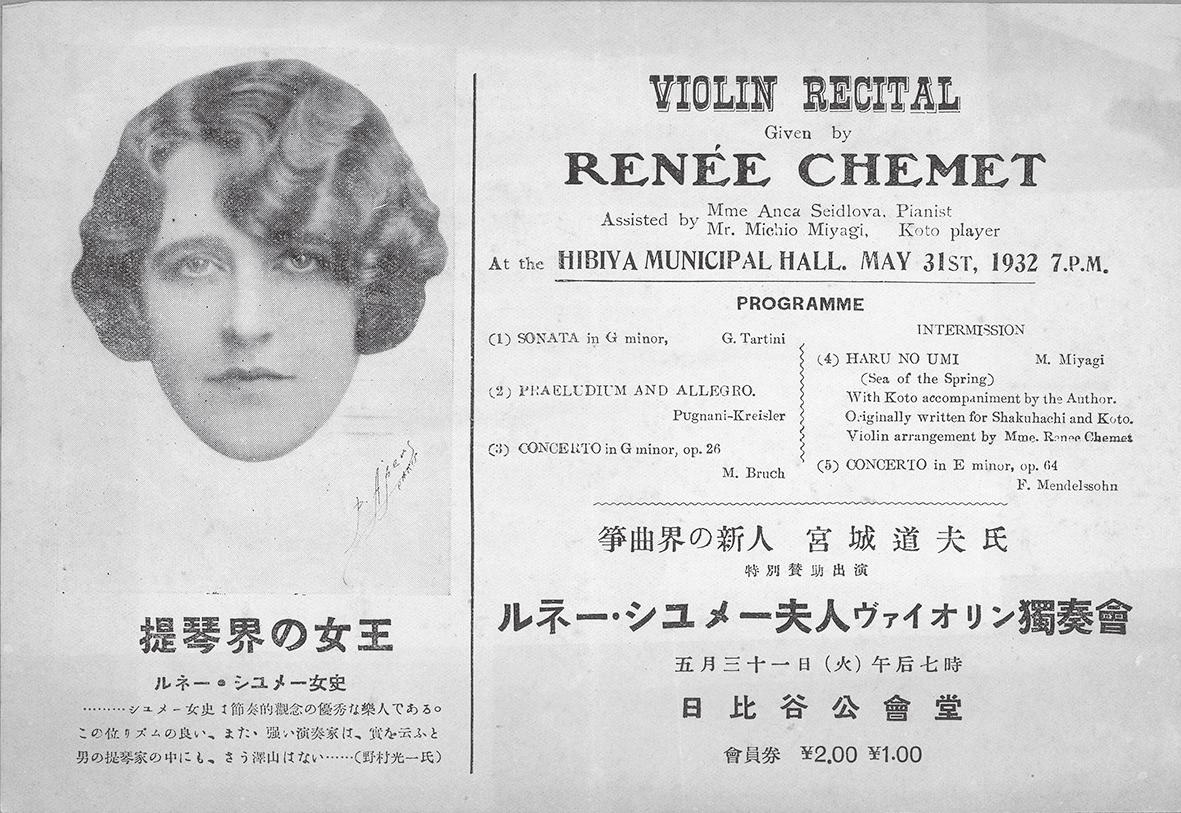
Pamphlet of Renée Chemet, Anca Seidlova and Michio Miyagi's recital that was held in Japan in 1932

Chemet traveled through Hawaii to Japan in 1932, to perform with pianist Anca Seidlova and koto player Michio Miyagi. Later that year, she performed with the BBC Orchestra.

== Personal life ==
Chemet married fellow French musician Camille Decreus in 1906. He died in 1939. She died in 1977, at age 89, in Paris.
