= Émile Girardin =

- Born: 1895
- Died: March 20, 1982
- Known for: president of Mouvement Desjardins from 1959 to 1972

For the French publisher see Émile de Girardin.

Joseph-C. Émile Girardin, CC (1895 – March 20, 1982) was a Canadian businessman and president of Mouvement Desjardins from 1959 to 1972.

In 1969, he was made a Companion of the Order of Canada, Canada's highest civilian honour, "for his service to savings institutions".
