= Chester Hougen =

American politician (1907–1982)

Member of the Iowa Senate from the 32nd district
- In office January 9, 1967 – January 11, 1971
- Preceded by: Andrew G. Frommelt
- Succeeded by: Lee Gaudineer

Member of the Iowa House of Representatives from the 66th district
- In office January 9, 1961 – January 11, 1965
- Preceded by: Bernard Balch; Robert D. Fulton
- Succeeded by: Multi-member district

Personal details
- Born: April 10, 1907 McCallsburg, Iowa
- Died: March 25, 1982 (aged 74) Leesburg, Florida
- Party: Republican

Chester Hougen (April 10, 1907 – March 25, 1982) was an American politician who served in the Iowa House of Representatives from the 66th district from 1961 to 1965 and in the Iowa Senate from the 32nd district from 1967 to 1971.

He died on March 25, 1982, in Leesburg, Florida at age 74.
