= Fred McEvoy (footballer) =

Australian rules footballer, born 1913

Personal information
- Full name: Frederick Joseph Bernard McEvoy
- Born: 3 November 1913; Werribee, Victoria
- Died: 15 March 1982 (aged 68); Werribee, Victoria
- Original team: Werribee
- Height: 174 cm (5 ft 9 in)
- Weight: 69 kg (152 lb)

Playing career^{1}
Years	Club	Games (Goals)
1935	Footscray	7 (0)
- ^{1} Playing statistics correct to the end of 1935.

Frederick Joseph Bernard McEvoy (3 November 1913 – 15 March 1982) was an Australian rules footballer who played with Footscray in the Victorian Football League (VFL).

McEvoy later served in the Australian Army during World War II, serving two stints in Papua New Guinea.
