= Ruth Edna Kelley =

American historian (1893–1982)

Ruth Edna Kelly
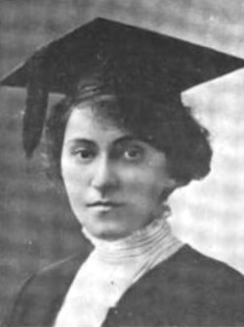
- At Radcliffe in 1914
- Born: April 8, 1893; Lynn, Massachusetts, U.S.
- Died: March 4, 1982 (aged 88); Marblehead, Massachusetts, U.S.
- Education: Radcliffe College
- Occupations: Librarian, writer
- Writing career
- Years active: 1919–1947

Ruth Edna Kelley (April 8, 1893 – March 4, 1982) was an American librarian and writer. She is chiefly remembered for The Book of Hallowe'en (1919), the first book-length history of the holiday.

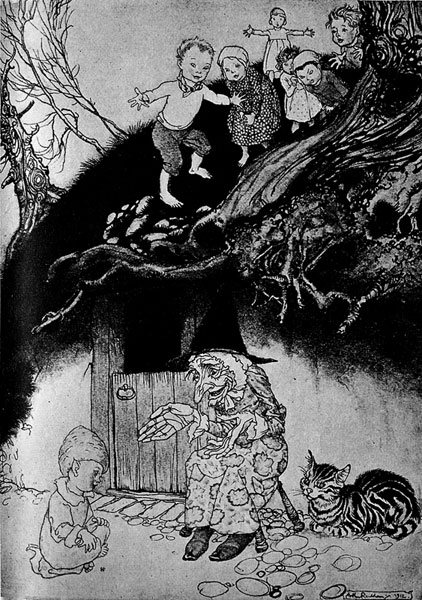
The Book of Hallowe'en/The Witch of the Walnut-Tree

== Biography ==
Kelley was born in Lynn, Massachusetts, on April 8, 1893, the only child of Charles F. Kelley, a carpenter, and his wife Mary. She grew up in Lynn, and graduated from Lynn High School. She received a master of arts degree in literature, magna cum laude, from Radcliffe College. She was a librarian at the Lynn Public Library from 1917 until her retirement in 1955.

The Book of Hallowe'en was Kelly's first book. Her second book, A Life of Their Own (1947), dealt with immortality and spirituality.

Kelley resided in Lynn for most of her life. In c. 1977 she moved to Marblehead, Massachusetts where she lived until her death at the age of 88. She died in Marblehead on March 4, 1982.
