= Boris Kotlyarov =

Soviet ethnomusicologist and pedagogue

Boris Yakovlevich Kotlyarov
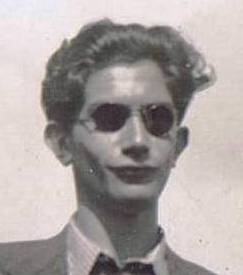
- Boris Kotlyarov, musicologist and pedagogue
- Born: 24 November 1913; Yelisavetgrad, Russian Empire (now Kropyvnytskyi, Ukraine)
- Died: 28 March 1982 (aged 68); Kishinev, Moldavian SSR, Soviet Union
- Occupations: Ethnomusicologist, violinist, pedagogue

Boris Yakovlevich Kotlyarov (Russian: Борис Яковлевич Котляров, Romanian: Boris Kotliarov, 1913–1982) was a Soviet ethnomusicologist, violinist and pedagogue. He was mainly known for his work on composers George Enescu and Alan Bush, as well as his extensive studies of the Lăutari violinist tradition of Romania and Moldova.

== Biography ==
Kotlyarov was born to a Jewish family in Yelisavetgrad, Russian Empire (now Kropyvnytskyi, Ukraine) on 24 November 1913. He was blinded at an early age. His family moved to Chișinău after the union of Bessarabia with Romania. He studied violin and composition at the Chișinău conservatory in the early 1930s.

In 1933, he left Romania for Liège, Belgium, studying at the Royal Conservatory of Liège. Upon the outbreak of World War II, he left Belgium for the United Kingdom, where he worked for the Soviet Embassy. In 1948 he returned to the Soviet Union.

In 1950, he moved back to Chișinău (then part of the Moldavian Soviet Socialist Republic) and became an instructor at the conservatory there. In 1974, he became a full professor there.

Among the major topics of his academic studies was the Romanian composer George Enescu. His biography of Enescu, translated into English and published in the United States in 1984, is considered to be the first full-length biography of the composer available in English. He also corresponded regularly with the British composer Alan Bush and wrote about him in Russian. And he wrote a number of works on the folk musics of Moldova, Romania, Ukraine, and Russia, and in particular on the Lăutari violin tradition.

He died in Chișinău on 28 March 1982.

== Selected works ==
- Джордже Энеску (George Enescu, Muzyka, Moscow, 1965, reprinted 1970)
- Музыкальная жизнь дореволюционного Кишинёва (The musical life of pre-revolutionary Kishinev; Kartya moldovenyaska, Chișinău, 1967)
- Алан Буш (Alan Bush, Sovetskiy kompozitor, Moscow, 1981)
- Из истории музыкальных связей Молдавии, Украины и России (From the history of musical interaction between Moldavia, Ukraine, Russia; Shtiintsa, Chișinău, 1982)
- Молдавские лэутары и их искусство (The Moldavian lautari and their art; Sovetskiy kompozitor, Moscow, 1989)
- Enesco: His Life and Times (Paganiniana Publications, New Jersey, 1984)
