= Lewis Litster =

Australian cricketer

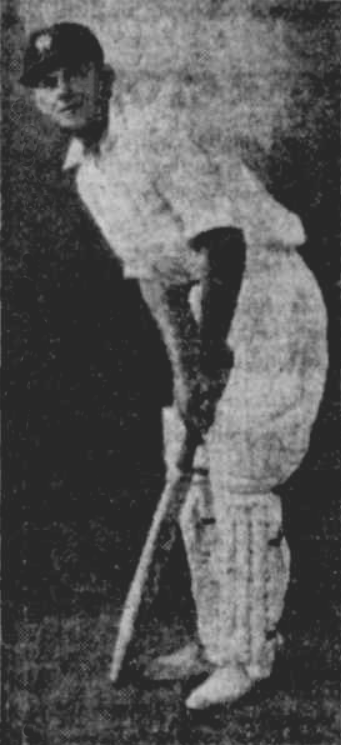

Personal information
- Born: 2 February 1904; Townsville, Queensland, Australia
- Died: 11 March 1982 (aged 78); Townsville, Queensland, Australia
- Source: Cricinfo, 5 October 2020

Lewis Litster (2 February 1904 – 11 March 1982) was an Australian cricketer. He played in ten first-class matches for Queensland between 1927 and 1933.

== See also ==
- List of Queensland first-class cricketers
