= Liu Puren =

Chinese politician

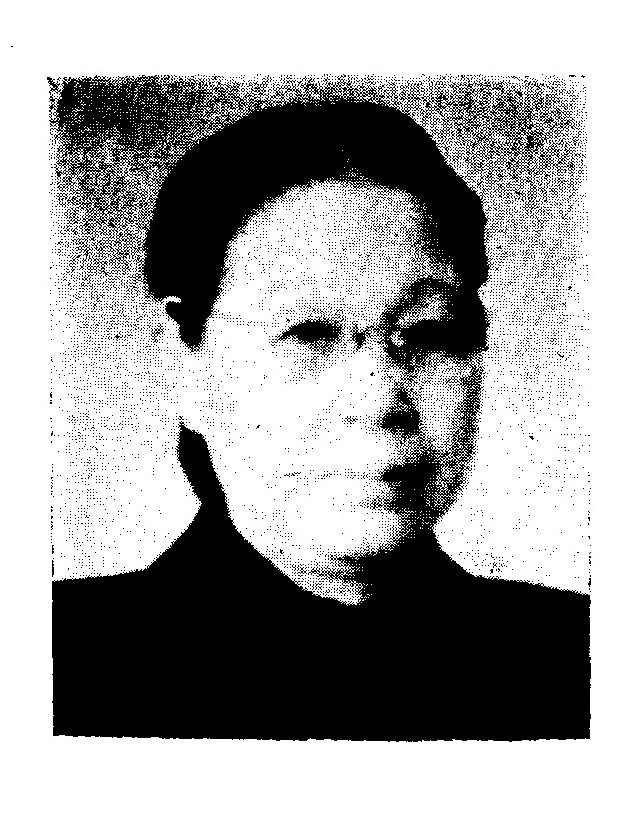

Member of the Legislative Yuan
- In office 1948–1982
- Constituency: Zhejiang

Personal details
- Died: 1 March 1982

Liu Puren (Chinese: 劉譜人, died 1 March 1982) was a Chinese politician. She was among the first group of women elected to the Legislative Yuan in 1948.

== Biography ==
Originally from Hangzhou in Zhejiang province, Liu was educated at Hangzhou Women's Normal School, after which she became headteacher of Shangyu County Girls' School. In 1930 she went to Japan to attend Tokyo College of Fine Arts, earning a bachelor's degree from the Japanese Culture Academy. Returning to China in 1932, she became director of the private Chunhui Middle School and manager of Zhejiang Province State Senior Midwife School. She also became a member of Hangzhou City Senate.

Having joined the Kuomintang in 1924, she became an executive member of its Shangyu County branch and head of its women's section. She was a Kuomintang candidate in Zhejiang in the 1948 elections for the Legislative Yuan, and was elected to parliament. She relocated to Taiwan during the Chinese Civil War, where she remained a member of the Legislative Yuan until her death in 1982.
