= Eddie Thompson (cricketer) =

English cricketer

Personal information
- Full name: Eddie Clarke Thompson
- Born: 27 February 1907; Leyton, Essex, England
- Died: 18 March 1982 (aged 75); Torquay, Devon, England
- Batting: Right-handed
- Role: Bowler

Domestic team information
- Years: Team
- 1926–1929: Essex

Career statistics
Competition	FC
Matches	44
Runs scored	696
Batting average
100s/50s
Top score
Balls bowled
Wickets	17
Bowling average
5 wickets in innings
10 wickets in match
Best bowling
Catches/stumpings
- Source: Cricinfo, 21 July 2013

Eddie Thompson (27 February 1907 – 18 March 1982) was an English cricketer. He played for Essex between 1926 and 1929.
