= Merv Wickham =

Australian rules footballer, born 1914

Personal information
- Full name: Mervyn Thomas Loch Wickham
- Born: 31 January 1914
- Died: 16 March 1982 (aged 68)
- Original team: West Hawthorn
- Height: 180 cm (5 ft 11 in)
- Weight: 78 kg (172 lb)

Playing career^{1}
Years	Club	Games (Goals)
1934	Hawthorn	1 (0)
- ^{1} Playing statistics correct to the end of 1934.

Mervyn Thomas Loch Wickham (31 January 1914 – 16 March 1982) was an Australian rules footballer who played with Hawthorn in the Victorian Football League (VFL).

Wickham suffered a serious ankle injury on his debut and did not play another league game. He was cleared to Melbourne in the 1938 pre-season but did not play a game before being allowed to join VFA club Camberwell in June of that year.
