= Anca Seidlova =

Czech-American pianist

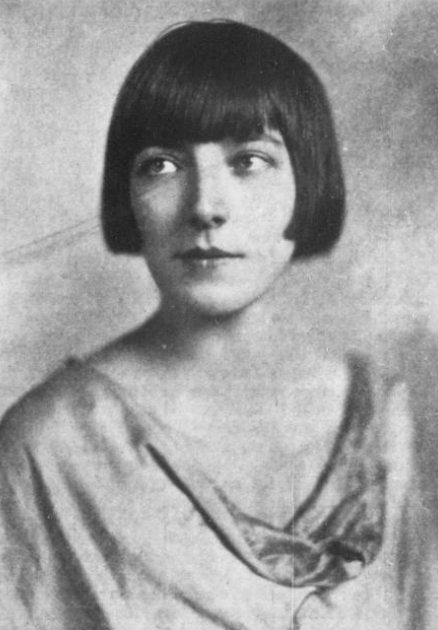
- Anca Seidlova, from a 1927 publication
- Born: April 19, 1895; Brno, Austria-Hungary
- Died: March 8, 1982 (aged 86); Marion, Massachusetts, United States
- Other names: Anca Edwards
- Occupation(s): Pianist, music educator, writer

Anca Seidlova Edwards (April 19, 1895 – March 8, 1982) was a Czech-American pianist.

== Early life and education ==
Anca Seidlová was born in Brno, the daughter of Jaroslav Seidl. Her father was a lawyer. She studied with Leoš Janáček at a conservatory in Brno, with Robert Teichmüller in Leipzig, and with Edwin Hughes and Alexander Lambert in New York.

== Career ==
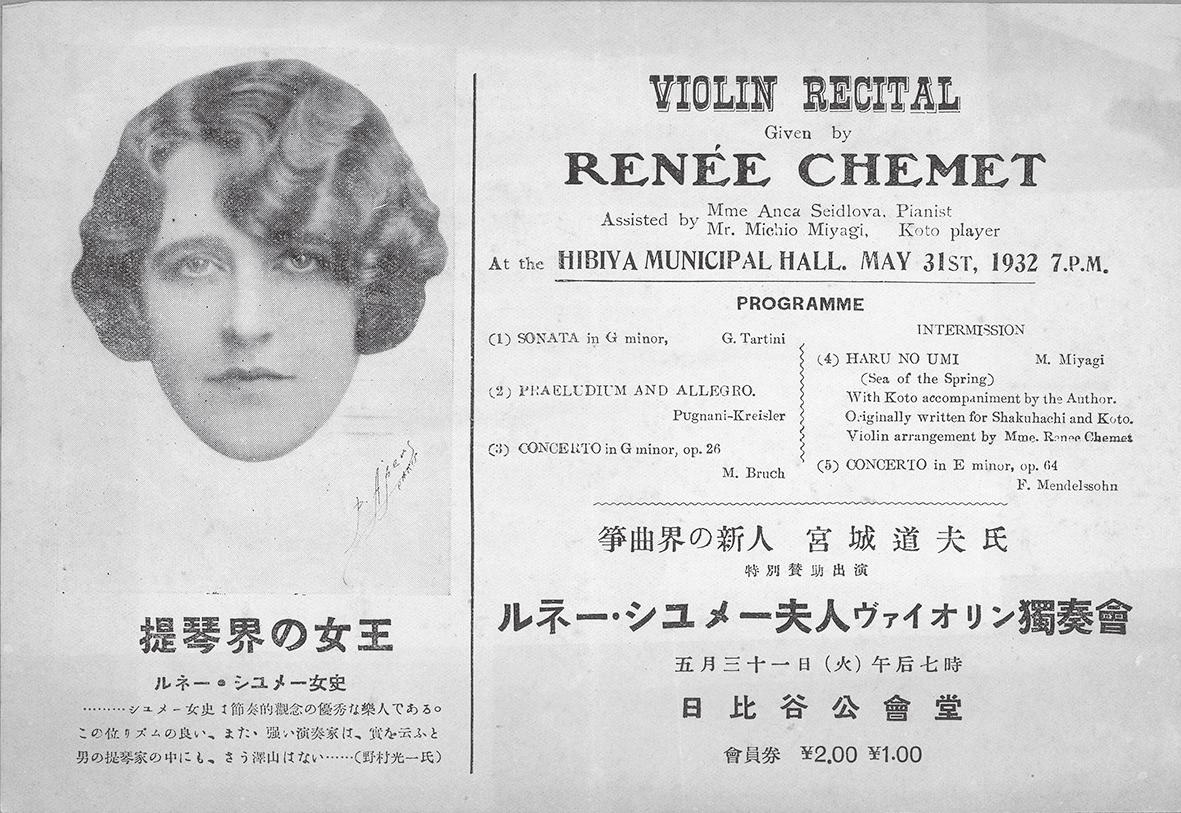
Pamphlet of Renée Chemet, Anca Seidlova and Michio Miyagi's recital that was held in Japan in 1932

Seidlova was a concert pianist and accompanist. She made her New York debut in 1926, at Aeolian Hall. "Miss Seidlova is a pianist of considerable technical attainments," noted a Boston Globe review in 1928. "She has a vigorous sense of rhythm, and a feeling for the tonal possibilities of the piano."

Seidlova made several recordings with French violinist Renée Chemet between 1926 and 1931. She performed with Chemet and koto player and composer Michio Miyagi in Japan in 1932. She played with the Wilberscheid String Quartet in 1934, and the Czechoslovak Instrumental Ensemble in 1935, both with Bedrich Vaska.

She co-authored a book for young readers on the history of music, and taught piano; one of her students was jazz bassist Gene Perla. "I always tell my students to think before they play," she explained in a 1974 interview. "It has to be in you—it has to be thought first."

== Publications ==
- "This Life is Mine" (1941, musical composition)
- The Heritage of Music (1963, with Katherine Binney Shippen)

== Personal life ==
Seidlova married American sea captain Charles G. Edwards in 1931. They lived in Teaneck, New Jersey in the 1930s, and later moved to Florida. Her husband died in 1973. In her last years, she wrote short stories, and attended weekly Russian language classes. She died in Marion, Massachusetts in 1982, at the age of 86.
