= Levon Khachikyan =

Armenian historian and philologist (1918–1982)

- Լևոն Խաչիկյան
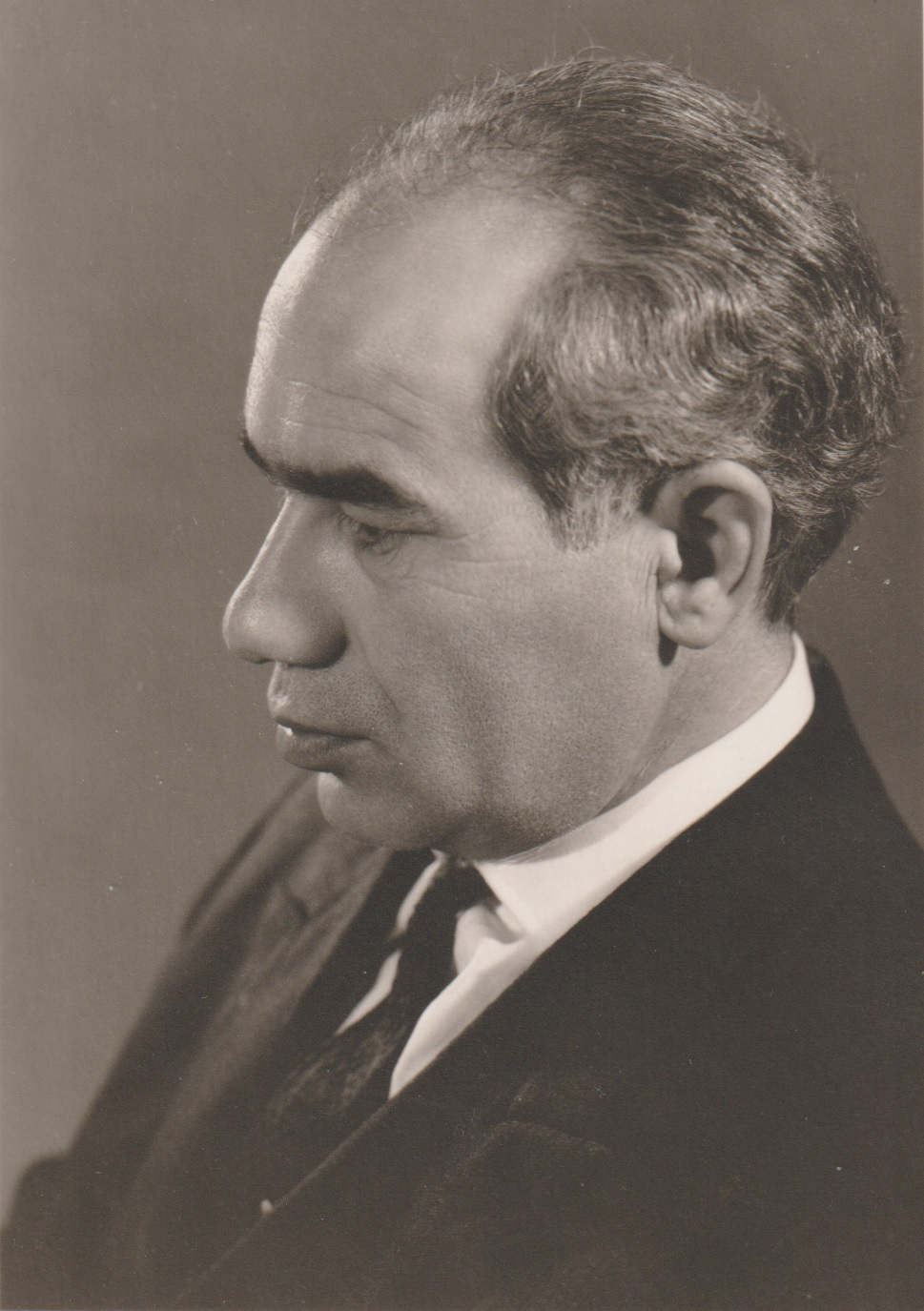
- Born: Levon Stepani Khachikyan; 1 May 1918; Yerevan, Transcaucasian Democratic Federative Republic
- Died: 12 March 1982 (aged 63); Yerevan, Armenian SSR, Soviet Union
- Education: Yerevan State University
- Spouse: Armenuhi Khachikyan
- Children: 2
- Awards: Honored Worker of Science of the Armenian SSR (1968); Mesrop Mashtots Award (1969); State Prize of the Armenian SSR (posthumous, 1984)
- Scientific career
- Fields: History; philology
- Workplaces: Matenadaran; Institute of History of the Academy of Sciences of the Armenian SSR
- Thesis: Yeghishei "Araratsots’ meknut’iwnë"
- Doctoral advisor: Hakob Manandian

Levon Stepani Khachikyan (Note: Also Khachikian) (Armenian: Լևոն Ստեփանի Խաչիկյան; 1 May 1918 – 12 March 1982) was a Soviet Armenian historian and philologist. He served as the director of the Mashtots Matenadaran from 1954 until his death. He specialized in medieval Armenian history and manuscripts, particularly focusing on economic history and the history of social movements. Under his leadership, the Matenadaran became a major research institution, expanding its collection and departments. He authored many works based on his extensive study of the Matenadaran's materials and other sources, notably publishing multiple compilations of 14th and 15th century Armenian colophons.

== Early life, education and career ==
Levon Khachikyan was born in Yerevan on 1 May 1918 to the family of an intellectual. After graduating from Khachatur Abovian High School in 1935, he enrolled in the Faculty of History at Yerevan State University. Immediately after graduating from university in 1940, he joined the staff of the Mashtots Matenadaran, first as a bibliographer, then as manager of the manuscript archive. He conducted his postgraduate studies under the guidance of renowned historian Hakob Manandian. He published his first work in the Matenadaran's journal Collection of Scientific Materials, publishing the text of Vanakan Vardapet's Yałags taremtin (On the beginning of the year) with an introduction and notes. In 1945, he successfully defended his dissertation titled Yeghishei "Araratsots’ meknut’iwnë" (Elishe's "Interpretation of Genesis", published as a book in 1993) and received the degree of Candidate of Historical Sciences. From 1951 to 1954, he worked at the Institute of History of the Academy of Sciences of the Armenian SSR, first as a senior researcher, then as the head of its publications department.

== Career ==
In 1954, at the age of 36, Khachikyan became the director of Matenadaran, a position he held until the end of his life. During Khachikyan's tenure, major changes took place at the Matenadaran. It transformed from a library-type institution into a major research institute, moved to its current building and gained new departments and researchers. The institute added 5471 new items to its collection of manuscripts between 1955 and 1978. According to former director of the Matenadaran Vahan Ter-Ghevondyan, Khachikyan had to overcome many difficulties during his time as director and sometimes came under scrutiny by the Soviet authorities, for examples, because of his hiring of people who were considered politically suspect.

Khachikyan wrote many works on medieval Armenian history based on his extensive study of manuscript materials. He focused particularly on socio-economic conditions and social and religious movements. Among his major works on these subjects are the book P’ok’r Hayk’i sots’ialakan sharzhumneri patmut’yunits’ (From the history of the social movements of Armenia Minor, 1951) and the articles "XIV-XV dareri haykakan gyughakan hamaynk’i masin" (On the 14th–15th-century Armenian village community, 1958), and "Yerznka k’aghak’i 'Yeghbarts’ miabanut’ean' kanonadrut’yunë" (The charter of the 'Order of Brothers' of the city of Erznka, 1962). His main period of interest was the late medieval period (14th–15th centuries), although a number of his works are dedicated to early medieval Armenian history, such as the aforementioned P’ok’r Hayk’i sots’ialakan sharzhumneri patmut’yunits’ and the articles "Otaralezu hay grakanut’yunë IV darum" (Foreign-language Armenian literature in the 4th century), and "Nakhamesropyan gri harts’ë yev hmayagrerë" (The question of pre-Mesropian writing and the charms). He wrote a number of studies on medieval Armenian feudal houses and their contributions to Armenian cultural production, such as "Ejer hamshinahay patmut’yunits’" (Pages from Hamshen Armenian history) and "Syunyats’ Orbelyanneri Burt’elyan chyughë" (The Burtelian branch of the Orbelians of Syunik), both published in 1969.

Khachikyan put to print various works of medieval Armenian literature for the first time. In the course of his research, he discovered important information about the social and economic life of medieval Armenia, the activities of monastic schools, centers of manuscript production and scholarship. For example, he was the first to discover a student's thesis from the medieval Armenian educational center of Gladzor. Khachikyan dedicated many years to the study, compilation and publication of the colophons of Armenian manuscripts, which contain important information about Armenian and non-Armenian political, cultural and socio-economic history. He published the work ZhD dari hayeren dzer’agreri hishatakaranner (14th-century colophons of Armenian manuscripts) in 1950 and the three-volume ZhE dari hayeren dzer’agreri hishatakaranner (15th-century colophons of Armenian manuscripts) from 1955 to 1967. For the first volume of the latter work, he received the rank of Doctor of Historical Sciences in 1961. In total, Khachikyan published around 3000 colophons. Khachikyan became a corresponding member of the Armenian Academy of Sciences in 1963 and a full member in 1971.

Khachikyan was the editor of the 3rd–13th volumes of the Matenadaran's official journal, Banber Matenadarani; under his editorship, the journal became a reputable scientific publication. He was a member of the editorial board of the Armenian Soviet Encyclopedia and of the multi-volume work Hay zhoghovrdi patmut’yun (History of the Armenian people). He contributed significantly to the writing of the fourth volume of the latter work, which focuses on the 14th–18th centuries. At Khachikyan's initiative, a new series of studies titled Documents of Economic History was begun at the Matenadaran, which was to publish primary sources regarding the economic life of Armenians and neighboring peoples. The first work of the series was Hovhannes Ter-Davt’yan Jughayets’u hashvetumarë (The ledger of Hovhannes Ter-Davtyan of Julfa), which Khachikyan had worked on with Hakob Papazyan for fifteen years. It was published in 1984, two years after Khachikyan's death.

Apart from his scholarly activities, Khachikyan held a number of public positions. He became a member of the Communist Party of the Soviet Union in 1950. He served as a member of the chairmanship of the Committee for Cultural Relations with the Armenian Diaspora and headed the Armenian division of the USSR-Iran Friendship Committee. He also served on the Yerevan City Council.

Levon Khachikyan died in Yerevan on 12 March 1982 after a long illness.

== Awards and honors ==
Khachikyan received several state awards for his scholarly achievements and leadership of the Matenadaran. He received the title of Professor in 1966 and the title Honored Worker of Science of the Armenian SSR in 1968. In 1969, he became the first recipient of highest honor bestowed by the Armenian Academy of Sciences, the Mesrop Mashtots Medal. In 1978, he was honored with the Friendship of Peoples Award on the occasion of his 60th birthday. In 1985, he was posthumously awarded the State Prize of the Armenian SSR for his contributions to the work Hay zhoghovrdi patmut’yun. In 2018, the Matenadaran organized an international academic conference on the occasion of Khachikyan's 100th birthday.

== Family ==
Levon Khachikyan was married to Armenuhi Khachikyan. His two daughters are both scholars: Margarit Khachikyan is an orientalist and Shushanik Khachikyan is an Armenologist.
