= Hey Diddle Diddle (disambiguation) =

Hey Diddle Diddle is a well-known English nursery rhyme.

Hey Diddle Diddle may also refer to:

- Hey Diddle Diddle (album), a 1976 album by Play School
- Hey-Diddle-Diddle, and Baby Hunting, an 1882 picture book by Randolph Caldecott
- Hey Diddle Diddle, a 1937 play by Bartlett Cormack
- "Hey Diddle Diddle", an episode of the television series Teletubbies
- "Hey Diddle Diddle", an episode of the television series Hi-de-Hi!
- "Hey Diddle Diddle", a series 10 episode of The Bill
- "Hey Diddle Diddle", a song by Eden Burning from Mirth and Matter (1994)
- "Hey Diddle Diddle", a song by Marvin Gaye from Moods of Marvin Gaye (1966)

== See also ==
- Diddle diddle, a common name of Grewia retusifolia, a species of Australian shrub
- Hi Diddle Diddle, a 1943 American comedy film
- "Hi Diddle Riddle", the first half-hour length episode of Batman to air, first broadcast on January 12, 1966
