= Esteban Muruetagoiena =

Spanish physician (1943–1982)

- Born: Esteban Muruetagoiena Scola; August 6, 1943; Ondárroa, Spain
- Died: March 28, 1982 (aged 38)
- Occupation: Physician
- Known for: Circumstances of death

Esteban Muruetagoiena Scola (August 6, 1943 – Oiartzun, Guipúzcoa, March 28, 1982) was a Spanish physician. On March 15, 1982, he was arrested by the Spanish Guardia Civil and then released on the 25th of the same month. He died three days later. His official cause of death was heart failure, but there are notable indications that he had been subject to torture.

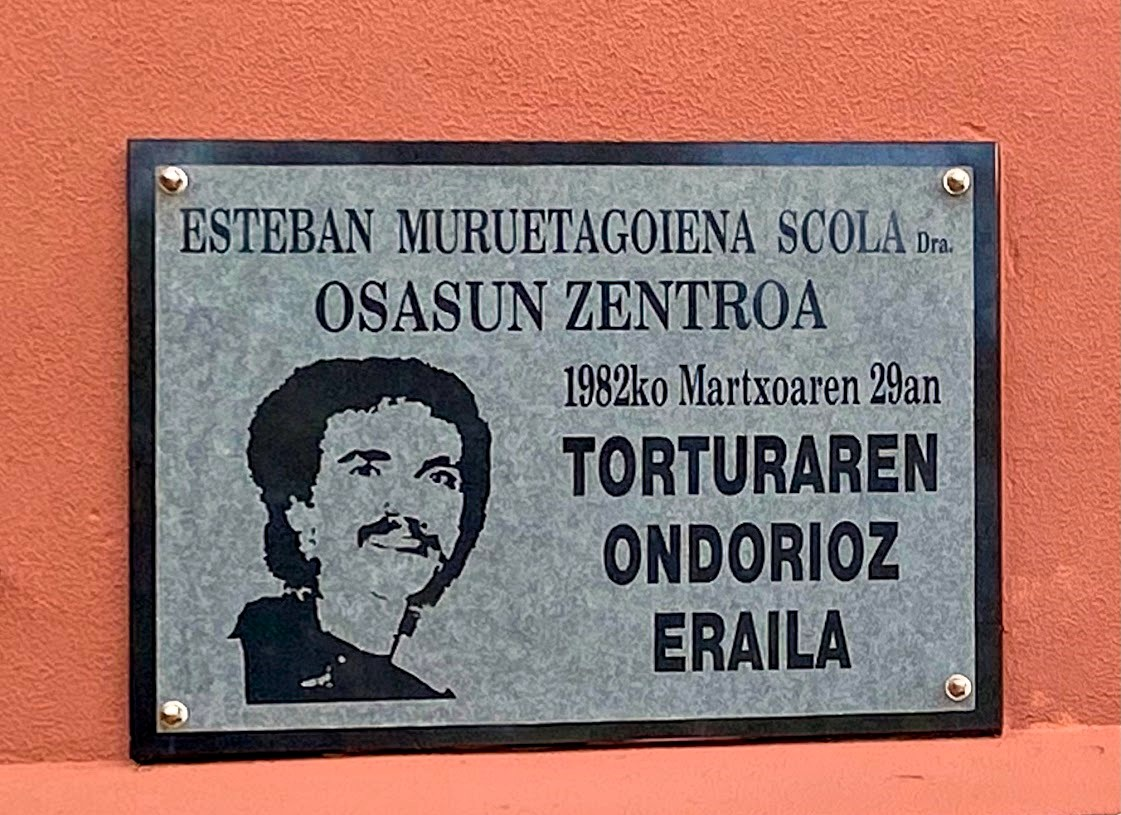
Plaque in memory of Muruetagoiena in Oiartzun. The inscription in Basque says "Esteban Muruetagoiena Scola Health Center" with the statement "March 29, 1982 murdered as a result of torture"

== Biography ==
Muruetagoiena was born on August 6, 1943, in Ondárroa. He was married to Elixabete Hormaza, with whom he had a daughter, activist Tamara Muruetagoiena.

=== First arrest ===
He was arrested for the first time in 1979 and accused of having given medical assistance to a wounded member of ETA who had been shot in 1977. The case was dismissed and Muruetagoiena was released without charges.

=== Second arrest ===
The Guardia Civil arrested him again on March 15, 1982, in Oiartzun. Following the antiterrorism law, he was kept in solitary confinement for 10 days in the police station in San Sebastián and in the headquarters of the Guardia Civil in Madrid where he was transferred.

No one knew about his detention until two days later. Several neighbors asked the mayor of his whereabouts after not being able to find him at his clinic, and that is how they found out he had been arrested. It's still not clear why he was detained the second time but on March 25 he was released. He was notably downfallen, confused, and showed signs of having been subjected to torture by security forces. He died on March 28, aged 38.

== Torture ==
The official sources insisted from the start that the cause of death had been a myocardial infarction. However, the autopsy report showed evidence of torture. There were burn marks on various parts of his body, probably resulting from the application of electrodes, hemorrhaging in his left ear, and genital inflammation. He died at home. Bixente Ibarguren was arrested during the same operation and confirmed the torture. He said there were beatings and the use of various methods of torture. He could hear Muruetagoiena during the detention and he confirmed afterwards that he was affected psychologically.

=== Demonstrations ===
There were numerous meetings, strikes and demonstrations protesting Esteban Muruetagoiena's death: in Mondragón, Éibar, Villafranca, Tolosa, Hernani, Lezo, Vergara, Zumárraga, Azcoitia, Azpeitia, Rentería, Berango, Arrigorriaga, Erandio, Lequeitio, Vitoria, Bilbao y Basauri. The city council of Oiartzun approved a motion in defiance of the antiterrorism law with the aim of guaranteeing every individual have the right to medical care and confidential legal assistance, and demanded an investigation of the case.

=== Versions of the story ===
The principal media declared cardiac arrest as the cause of death, in accordance with official sources. Txema Montero, the lawyer who was following the case, contacted human rights organizations so that they could participate in the case and ask for an investigation. Organizations like Amnesty International and Anti-Torture Research (ATR) took over the case. ATR, a global medical organization, mentioned the numerous, serious irregularities surrounding the autopsies in a press conference in Paris before a large group of media organizations. According to the same, the diagnosis from the autopsy would not be legal and would have no support.

The Egin newspaper published that Muruetagoiena had been tortured. The Guardia Civil sued the newspaper for "false, libelous, and malicious news".

== Remembrance ==
2007 marked the 25th anniversary of Muruetagoiena's death. Ceremonies to honor Oiartzun's doctor were held in the town itself where he worked as well as in Ondárroa. During the commemoration, the Group against Torture in the Basque Country acknowledged that there had been torture. As part of the event and by request of the town, the new health center was renamed Esteban Muruetagoiena with a plaque in his memory. In 2012, 30 years after his death, the doctor was remembered again during a weekend of dance, music, various speeches and the appearance or his daughter.

On May 9, 2010, about 4 in the morning, several unknown persons destroyed the commemorative plaque in the Oiartzun health center. Rodolfo Ares, Minister of the Interior of the Basque Government at that time, acknowledged that the evidence pointed to the fact that a Basque police officer had been responsible for the damage, but said that ″he was acting on his own″. The city council of Oiartzun demanded an investigation of the case and the parliamentarian Mikel Basabe asked the minister to inform him of the results once they were known. After the inquiries, the man responsible for the crime was suspended for two months without pay, and sanctioned by the committee with two serious demerits. On November 6, 2010, the doctor was again commemorated. During the ceremony the doctor's daughter revealed the new plaque.

=== The Doctor movie ===
Esteban's daughter Tamara edited a documentary in 2007 about her father. The Doctor is a short video lasting about 10 minutes which gives a summary of Muruetagoiena's life and story. The events are put in context and it is made clear that the signs of torture found after the doctor's death were not properly investigated by authorities. The video is a plea for peace and leaves a clear message against ETA violence and against torture. In 2012, the Basque director Bertha Gaztelumendi introduced the documentary Mariposas en el hierro (Butterflies in iron) at the San Sebastián International Film Festival. The work gathers the voices of women who are demanding peace in the Basque Country and who have been victims of violence. Tamara Muruetagoiena participates in the documentary, in her role as an activist against torture, and in meetings and forums.

=== Civic forums against torture ===
The Initiative against Torture in Navarre held a civic forum from March 25–26, 2010 dedicated to Esteban Muruetagoiena. During the conference, the role of civil society in the eradication of torture was discussed. The conclusions were taken to the Parliament of Navarre.

On March 31, 2012, the II Foro Cívico contra la Tortura Esteban Muruetagoiena (Second Esteban Muruetagoiena Civic Forum against Torture) was held in Oiartzun. There were various speeches by lawyers, doctors, family members and members of the Euskal Memoria foundation, who spoke about Esteban and explained more about what happened in 1982. There was also a screening of the documentary The Doctor. The forum held a roundtable called "30 years later… where are we headed?" with participation from representatives of Euskal Memoria, Lokarri, Grupo contra la tortura (TAT), Amnesty International, Jaiki Hadi, Coordinadora para la Prevención y Denuncia de la Tortura (CPDT), Argituz and two torture victims. The conference concluded with a theatrical representation.
