= Marguerite Grépon =

French journalist

- Born: 28 December 1891; Souillac
- Died: 9 March 1982 (aged 90); Villeneuve-la-Garenne
- Occupations: Journalist and writer
- Writing career
- Genres: non-fiction; poetry
- Notable work: Ariane

Marguerite Grépon (28 December 1891 – 9 March 1982) was a French journalist and writer. She founded the literary magazine Ariane in 1953.

== Life ==
She was born in Souillac. Her father worked in the colonial administration in Algeria and Indochina. Her mother, Marie-Louis Faurie, was the daughter of notary and general councilor of Lot. Marguerite Grépon was brought up with her grandparents in Moissac before joining her parents in Indochina. She returned to France at the age of 17 years. She lived in Marseille and then in Nice. She enrolled at the Beaux-Arts and began to publish for the local press.

She published her first novel in 1928, La voyageuse nue. She settled in Paris where she frequented literary circles.

In 1933, she wrote an article on feminism in La Femme de France magazine. She drew a contrasting picture of the role of women in society in which women's emancipation stalled in the 1930s. She published various articles on feminism as well as portraits of great figures of feminism at the time from Louise Weiss to Maria Verone.

In 1936, she published in the magazine Esprit. After the liberation of France from Nazi occupation, she met Simone de Beauvoir and collaborated in Modern Times.

In 1953, she founded a literary magazine Ariane: women's notebooks, as a space for women. From 1957, the magazine became Ariane: Les cahiers culturels. The journal awards a diary prize each year. Grépon published and made known the poets Minou Drouet, Renee Rivet, Anne-Marie de Backer, Jeanne Kieffer, Pierrette Micheloud, and Suzanne Arlet.

Grépon died in Villeneuve-la-Garenne on 9 March 1982.

== Works ==
- Écritures de la nuit : essai de fixation d'une conscience colorée, Uzès : Formes et langages, 1977. OCLC 4489288
- Mediumnite fardeau : poèmes; suivis de, Pièces courtes, Paris : J. Millas-Martin, 1965, OCLC 13537481
- Folle genése : expérience poétique Paris : José Millas-Martin, 1968. OCLC 973574377
- Anti-poèmes et paraboles à partir de l'infinitif, Uzès (mas de Poiriers (30700)) : Formes et langages, 1972, OCLC 462046819

- Marguerite Grépon; Roger Martin du Gard Journal ... 1, Rodez : Subervie, 1960. OCLC 460535504
- Marguerite Grépon; Jean de Beer Schéhérazade, Rodez : Subervie, 1966. OCLC 490920363
