= Bill Adkins =

Canadian politician

William Adkins, CM (died March 28, 1982) was a Canadian noted for his 50 plus years service to amateur theatre.

== Early life ==
Adkins was born in Winslow, Buckinghamshire, circa 1889. He left England for Canada circa 1911, farming near Edmonton and working for the Hudson's Bay Company. During World War I, he served with the Canadian Field Artillery in Europe. After the war, he returned to Canada, settled in Ottawa, and married Gertrude Helen Green, with whom he had two children. He joined the Department of Indian Affairs, where he met Duncan Campbell Scott through whom he became involved in the theatre.

== Theatre work ==
Adkins worked backstage on every production of the Ottawa Drama League (later the Ottawa Little Theatre) after 1920. Over many years, he worked as electrician, carpenter, scene shifter, scene painter, lighting operator, set designer, set builder, and, from 1927, stage manager. During World War II, Adkins arranged and stage managed shows for troops. Adkins continued as stage manager of the Ottawa Little Theatre after the war, travelling with it to the Dominion Drama Festival and other regional performances. He also supervised visiting stage managers when Ottawa hosted drama festivals, and managed the stage and lighting for the outdoor theatre at a summer drama school for children. Adkins was still stage manager at the time that the Ottawa Little Theatre burnt down in 1970, and when it reopened after rebuilding in 1972, with improved stage facilities. He retired from the theatre in 1979, and died in Ottawa on 28 March 1982.

== Awards ==
Adkins received a 1960 Canadian Drama Award, in recognition of outstanding contributions to Canadian theatre. In 1973, the first year it was awarded, he was invested with the Member of the Order of Canada, "for his 50 years' service to the amateur theatre movement in Ottawa and to the Dominion Drama Festival". In 2013, during their 100th season celebrations, the Ottawa Little Theatre named him as a Cornerstone Inductee, an honor instituted for volunteers who made an extraordinary contribution to the development of the theatre.
