= Syd Desireau =

Canadian ice hockey player

- Born: March 30, 1898 Nelson, British Columbia, Canada
- Died: March 23, 1982 (aged 83) Trail, British Columbia, Canada
- Height: 5 ft 9 in (175 cm)
- Weight: 160 lb (73 kg; 11 st 6 lb)
- Position: Defence
- Played for: Vancouver Millionaires
- Playing career: 1919–1927

Alsid Aural Desireau (March 30, 1898 – March 23, 1982) was a Canadian professional ice hockey player from Nelson, British Columbia. Desireau, a defenceman, played two seasons with the Vancouver Millionaires of the Pacific Coast Hockey Association between 1920 and 1922. Prior to suiting up for the Millionaires Desireau had spent time overseas with the Canadian forces in World War I.

He died in 1982 of bladder cancer.
