= Peter Heier =

Catholic priest

- Пітер Геєр
- Born: September 16, 1895; Kleinliebental, Russian Empire (now Malodolynske, Ukraine)
- Died: March 24, 1982 (aged 86); Rochester, New York
- Occupation: Priest

Father Peter Heier (Note: Ukrainian: Пітер Геєр, romanized: Piter Heier) (September 16, 1895 – March 24, 1982), S.V.D. was a Roman Catholic priest of Hague, North Dakota.

Peter Heier was the son of George and Magdalena (Wolf) Heier. He was born in Kleinliebental (today Malodolynske), Ukraine. His family immigrated to the United States and settled in North Dakota. Heier studied for the priesthood and was stationed in Hague, North Dakota, where he also served as an exorcist. He served as a Divine Word missionary in China, where he was put in charge of a noted demonic possession case in 1926 and again in 1929, concerning a Chinese woman named Lautien in Henan, China. The case was printed up in a pamphlet entitled Begone Satan by Father Celestine Kapsner in 1928.

Heier died in Rochester, New York, on March 24, 1982, at the age of 86.
