= Eddie Kushner =

Canadian football player (1912–1982)

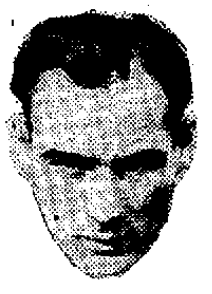
- Kushner pictured in the Winnipeg Free Press, November 11, 1938

Profile
- Position: Guard

Personal information
- Born: July 19, 1912; Winnipeg, Manitoba, Canada
- Died: March 1, 1982 (aged 69); Vancouver, British Columbia, Canada
- Listed weight: 189 lb (86 kg)

Career history
- 1933–1940: Winnipeg Blue Bombers

Awards and highlights
- 2× Grey Cup champion (1935, 1939)

Edward Maurice Kushner (July 19, 1912 – March 1, 1982) was a Canadian professional football player who played for the Winnipeg Blue Bombers. He won the Grey Cup with Winnipeg in 1935 and 1939. He married Winnifred Ellen Cunliffe in 1936 and was alter a Chief Petty Officer in the Canadian Navy. He died of motor neuron disease in 1982.
