= Grahame Hall =

Australian rules footballer

Personal information
- Full name: Grahame Hall
- Born: 15 August 1919
- Died: 5 March 1982 (aged 62)
- Height: 183 cm (6 ft 0 in)
- Weight: 92 kg (203 lb)

Playing career^{1}
Years	Club	Games (Goals)
1939, 1941	South Melbourne	11 (2)
- ^{1} Playing statistics correct to the end of 1941.

Grahame Hall (15 August 1919 – 5 March 1982) was an Australian rules footballer who played with South Melbourne in the Victorian Football League (VFL).
