= Kiyo Murashima =

Japanese politician (1892–1982)

- 村島 喜代

Member of the House of Representatives
- In office 10 April 1946 – 31 March 1947
- Preceded by: Constituency established
- Succeeded by: Constituency abolished
- Constituency: Niigata 1st

Personal details
- Born: 6 October 1892 Niigata Prefecture, Japan
- Died: 11 March 1982 (aged 89) Niigata City, Niigata, Japan
- Party: Progressive
- Other party: Democratic (1947)

Kiyo Murashima (Japanese: 村島喜代; 6 October 1892 – 11 March 1982) was a Japanese politician. She was one of the first group of women elected to the House of Representatives in 1946.

== Biography ==
Murashima was born in Niigata Prefecture in 1892. She graduated from Niigata Prefectural Nagaoka Girl's Normal School in 1911, after which she studied at Tsuda Girl's English School. She then returned to Niigata and worked as a dormitory supervisor at Niigata Prefectural High School for Girls, and became a member of the Personal Affairs Mediation Committee.

Murashima contested the 1946 general elections (the first in which women could vote) as a Japan Progressive Party candidate, and was elected to the House of Representatives. In March 1947 the Progressive Party merged into the Democratic Party. Murashima was a Demopcratic Party candidate in the April 1947 elections, but was not elected. She subsequently worked as a mediator for Niigata family court, and died in 1982.
