= P.G. O'Dea =

Irish playwright (1898–1982)

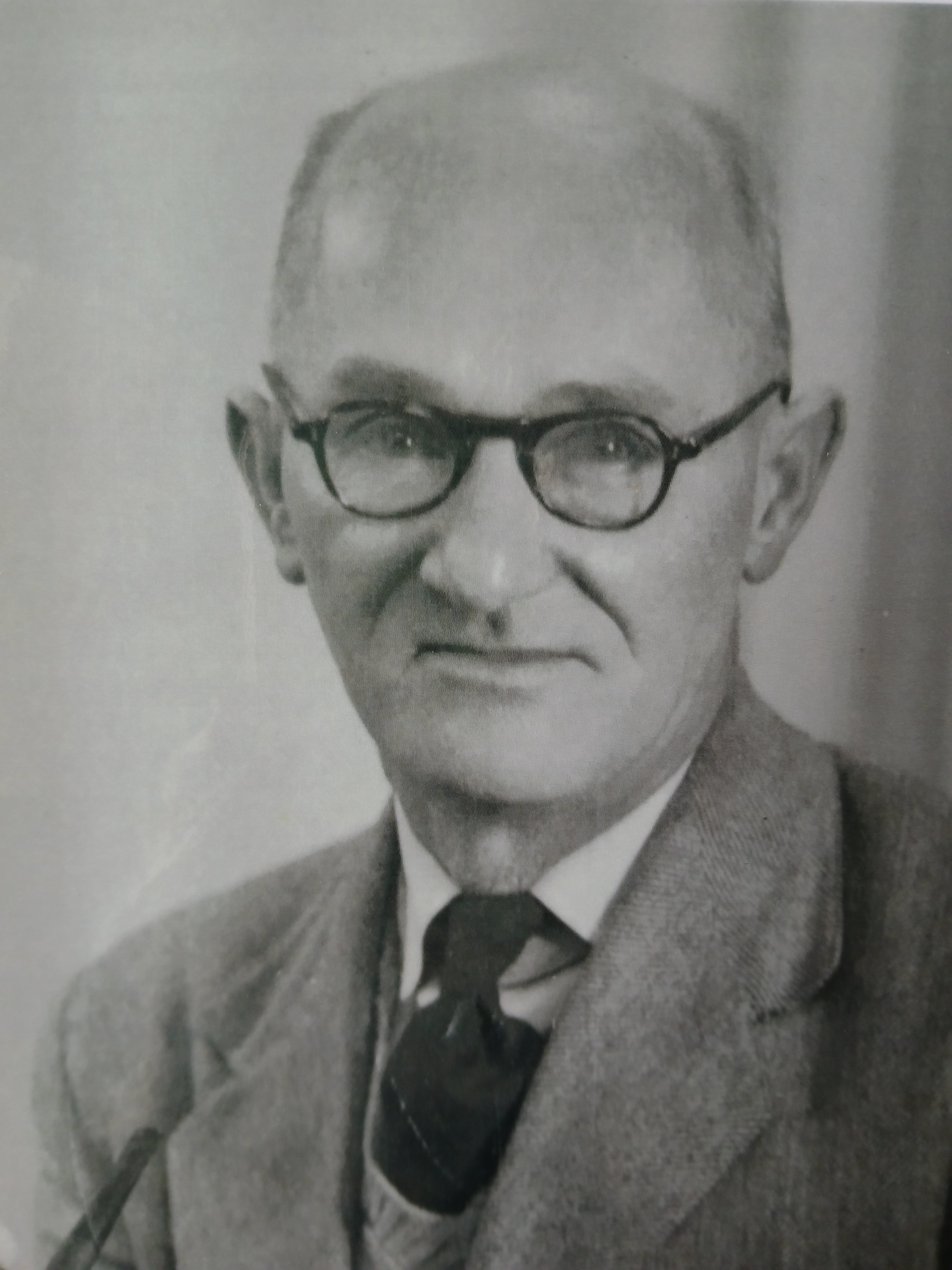
- Born: Patrick Gerard O'Dea; 7 November 1898; Limerick, Ireland
- Died: 12 March 1982 (aged 83); Dublin, Ireland
- Occupations: Teacher, playwright

P.G. O'Dea (7 November 1898 – 1982) was an Irish playwright known for his comedic plays and contributions to Irish amateur theatre in the mid-20th century.

== Biography ==
Born in Limerick in 1898, O'Dea spent most of his life in Athlone, where he taught at the local technical school, known locally as "The Tech". From his home at Court Devenish, located near the River Shannon, he wrote a series of plays that were the subject of positive reviews within Ireland's amateur theatre circuit. After retiring from teaching, O'Dea relocated to Dublin, where he lived until his death in 1982.

== Works ==
O'Dea's work as a playwright spanned several decades, during which he wrote numerous plays, including Poor Jimmy, Johnnie's Britches, A Man of Ideas, and Down the Middle. His plays often explored themes of Irish identity, politics, and social life, and were characterized by a blend of humour and critical observation. His works were popular in the Irish amateur theatre circuit in the mid-20th century.

While he initially wrote under the pseudonym 'Morgan Brookes'. O'Dea's true identity was revealed, by a fellow educator, following a performance of Kitty Breaks the Ice in 1946.

Johnnie's Britches won the 3-act Confined Competition at the Western Drama Festival in 1947, receiving praise from adjudicator Lennox Robinson as "one of the most entertaining he had ever seen". In the conservative cultural climate of mid-20th century Ireland, however, Johnnie's Britches faced some backlash over its title. A Protestant minister, for example, criticised the word "britches" as indecent. As a result, the title was temporarily abbreviated to "Johnnie", and some dramatic societies adopted the alternative title "Don Juan's Pantaloons". However, the original title was restored in later printings, and "Johnnie's Britches" continued to be performed under its original name.

== Later life and legacy ==
After retiring from teaching, O'Dea moved to Dublin. His plays continued to be staged over the years, often from well-worn scripts that had survived the passage of time.

P.G. O'Dea's plays have experienced a revival across Ireland in the early 21st century, with performances being staged in several regions and in the USA. For example, A Man of Ideas was revived in 2014 by the New Haven Gaelic Players in Connecticut, USA, decades after its original performances in Ireland. Poor Jimmy has also seen renewed interest, with performances across the country, including in County Kerry and County Cork. Johnnie's Britches, historically a "crowd favourite", was staged by Beezneez Theatre Company as part of a 2012 nationwide tour in Ireland, which included a performance at the Civic Theatre in Tallaght.

O'Dea also wrote a song titled "Dear Love", which was used as part of the Centenary of the Easter Rising commemorations at the RTÉ All-Ireland Drama Festival in Athlone.

== Selected works ==
- Kitty Breaks the Ice (1943)
- Johnnie's Britches (1945)
- Bachelor Barney (1947)
- Poor Jimmy (1947)
- A Man of Ideas (1948)
- Down the Middle (1949)
- Simey's Shadow (1951)
- Paddy the Englishman (1951)
- The Diddler (1960)
- Above Every Other Evil? (1962)
