= Dahiya (surname) =

Dahiya is an Indian clan found among Jats and Rajputs. Notable people bearing this surname include:

== People with this surname ==
- Amit Kumar Dahiya (born 1983), Indian wrestler
- Babulal Dahiya (born 1949), Indian agriculturist
- Bhim S. Dahiya (born 1938), Indian academic and politician
- Dharan Singh Dahiya (born 1967), Indian Olympian wrestler
- Hoshiar Singh Dahiya (1937–1998), Indian Army officer awarded Param Veer Chakra
- Jagbir Dahiya (born 1970), Indian film director & producer
- Jat Mehar Singh Dahiya, Indian poet and freedom fighter
- Jai Tirath Dahiya (born 1952), Indian politician
- Kushal Singh Dahiya, martyr
- Nisha Dahiya (born 1998), Indian wrestler
- Padam Singh Dahiya (born 1963), Indian politician
- Parteek Dahiya (born 2002), Indian kabaddi player
- Preeti Dahiya (born 2004), Indian boxer
- Rajneesh Dahiya (born 1977), Indian politician
- Rajvir Dahiya (born 1956), Indo-American scientist
- Ravi Kumar Dahiya (born 1999), Indian wrestler
- Rizak Ram Dahiya (born 1912), Indian politician, minister
- Rohit Dahiya (born 1988), Indian cricketer
- Rohtas Singh Dahiya (born 1960), Indian wrestler
- Vijay Dahiya (born 1973), Indian cricketer
- Vikas Dahiya (born 1995), Indian field hockey goalkeeper
- Vinod Kumar Dahiya (born 1986), Indo-Australian wrestler
- Virender Dahiya (born 1989), Indian cricketer
- Vivek Dahiya (born 1984), Indian television actor
