= Jat reservation agitation =

2016 violent protests

The Jat reservation agitation was a series of violent protests in February 2016 by the Jats of North India, especially those in the state of Haryana, which "paralysed" the state for 10 days. The protestors sought inclusion of their caste in the Other Backward Class (OBC) category, which would make them eligible for affirmative action benefits. Besides Haryana, the protests also spread to the neighbouring states, such as Uttar Pradesh, Rajasthan, and the National Capital Region.

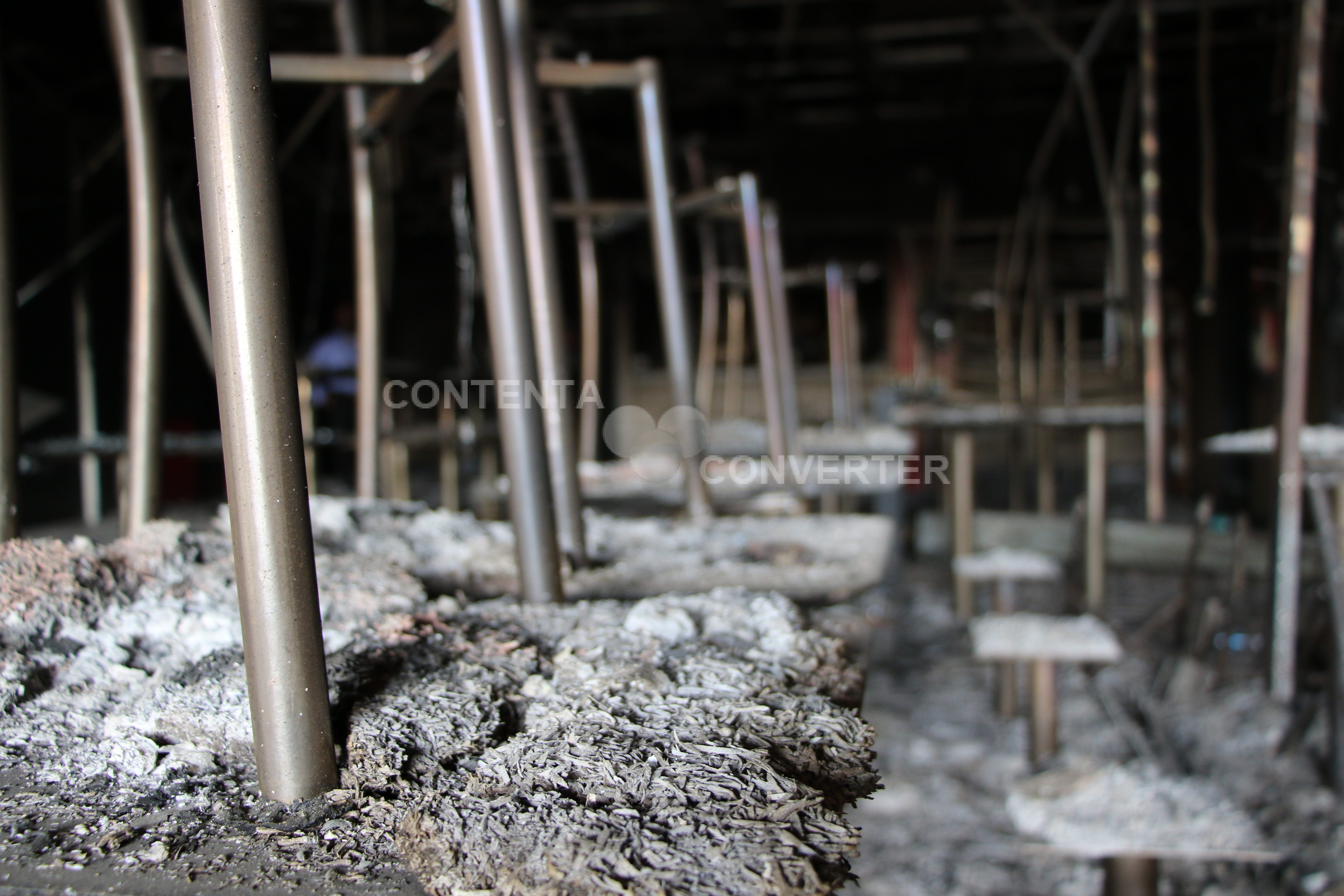
Rohtak burning - McDonald's burnt down

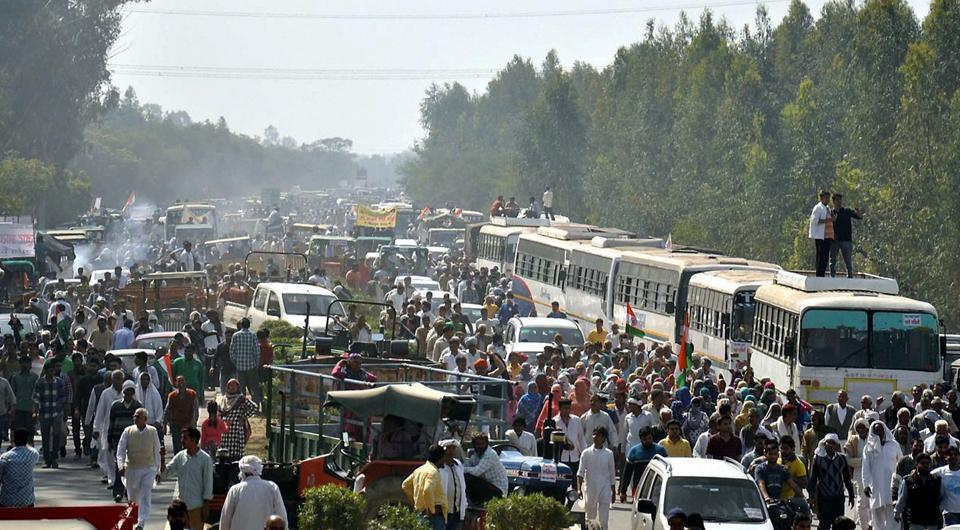
Jat Protester blocking roads after police action

Police and onlookers described the initial phase of the protests as peaceful but it later transformed into violent riots led by Jat community, especially in the city of Rohtak. Starting on 12 February, the Jats organized non-violent protests for reservation by blocking railway lines and roads, while non-Jats opposed to their demands, organized counter-protests. On 18 February, a group of non-Jats protesters clashed violently with a group of lawyers protesting against 2016 JNU sedition controversy, mistaking the lawyers for Jats. Later, they also came into conflict with the Jat students. On the same day, the police allegedly beat up some Jat students in Rohtak, while trying to open a blockade. Police also raided a Jat hostel, and reportedly assaulted the Jat students, an occurrence which was captured on camera and circulated over social media. Following these incidents, several incidents of inter-caste violence took place across Haryana.

By 25 February, the riots were estimated to have caused a loss of ₹340 billion (US$3.5 billion) in northern India. The Railway Minister told in the Lok Sabha that the total loss suffered by Railways on account of damage to property and cancellation of ticketswas about Rs 55.92 crore. By 26 February, people had been killed in the violence.

The government of Haryana had approved the Haryana Backward Classes (Reservation in Services and Admission in Educational Institutions) Bill on 29 March 2016, and notified the Act on 13 May 2016. The enacted Bill enlisted the Jats of Hindu, Sikh and Muslim jats, Bishnois, Tyagis, and Rors in the recently sculpted Backward Classes (C) category, making them eligible for 10% reservation in class 3 and 4, and 6% reservation in class 1 and 2 jobs. On 26 May 2016, the Punjab and Haryana High Court ruled against the Bill and now jats come in general category.

== Background ==
The Jat people are a traditionally agricultural community in Northern India. In 2012, the Hindustan Times reported that the Jat people in India were estimated to number around 95.5 million (9.55 crore). In Haryana, they form 30% of the state's population. As of 2016, 7 out of state's 10 chief ministers had been Jats. In Punjab, Rajasthan and Delhi, they constitute 30% ,18% and 17% of the total populace, respectively. In Uttar Pradesh, the Jats form more than 6% of the population, however, their concentration in Western Uttar Pradesh makes them an important vote bank in more than 50 assembly seats and 29% population are Jats in Western Uttar Pradesh.

The Central Government of India as well as the various State Governments categorize certain socially backward castes as Other Backward Classes (OBC). The castes listed in this category have been eligible for affirmative action benefits since 1991. Collectively, these castes have reserved quotas in government jobs, admissions to educational institutes, scholarships and other areas. The communities which are included in OBC are different in different states. The OBCs have 27% reservation; in addition, there are other classes which have Scheduled Castes (15%) reservation and the Scheduled Tribes (7.5%) reservation. In all, 49.5% of the seats are reserved for these three groups. Some state governments have tried to create additional reservation quotas, but the Supreme Court of India has ruled that the reservation cannot exceed 50%.

Like many other castes, the Jats have sought to get themselves included in the OBC category in order to get the reservation benefits. Before the 2016 protests, they had already been given OBC status in 7 states: Chhattisgarh, Delhi, Himachal Pradesh, Madhya Pradesh, Rajasthan, Uttar Pradesh and Uttarakhand. However, Jats were not included in the Central Government's list of OBC castes. Also, in Punjab and Haryana, the Jats did not enjoy any reservation benefits. In Rajasthan, the Jats from Bharatpur and Dholpur districts were excluded from the OBC list, as the former kingdoms of Bharatpur and Dholpur had been ruled by Jats.

=== Central OBC quota ===
According to the National Commission for Backward Classes (NCBC) guidelines, to be classified as OBC, a caste has to satisfy the following criteria:

1. Social: The caste should be considered as socially backward by other castes
2. Educational: The caste's school non-enrollment rate should be at least 25% above the state average
3. Economic: The assets of the average caste family should be at least 25% below the state average

In 1997, the NCBC reviewed a demand to include Jats from Delhi, Haryana, Madhya Pradesh, Rajasthan and Uttar Pradesh in the Central OBC list. It agreed to include the Rajasthan Jats (except those from the former Jat-ruled princely states of Bharatpur and Dholpur) in the Central OBC list. In a report dated 28 November 1997, it recommended against including other Jats in the OBC list, arguing that they were socially advanced. This recommendation was supplemented by an Indian Institute of Public Administration (IIPA) report. On 27 October 1999, the BJP-led NDA government implemented the recommendation to include the Rajasthan Jats (except those from Bharatpur and Dholpur) in the Central OBC list. Later, on 1 January 2000, the Bharatpur and Dholpur Jats were also included in the list.

In July and September 2010, the Akhil Bhartiya Jat Arakshan Samiti organized protests in Delhi and Haryana seeking OBC status for Jats. One person was killed in this agitation. In 2011, the protesters blocked railway tracks in Uttar Pradesh and Haryana. In March 2011, the Congress-led United Progressive Alliance (UPA) amended rules to allow NCBC to reconsider its earlier rulings. Subsequently, in July 2011, the NCBC suggested that the Indian Council of Social Science Research (ICSSR) conduct a survey in 6 states to analyze the socio-economic status of Jats. The original plan involved a comprehensive survey, but this was later reduced to a sample survey, to be supplemented with data from the Socio Economic and Caste Census 2011 (SECC).

In February 2012, the Jats resumed their protests, during which one person was killed. In August 2013, the government constituted a special Group of Ministers (GoM) to "engage with representatives of the Jat community". On 19 December 2013, the Union Cabinet asked NCBC to expediate the process and make a decision based on existing material. It also requested that Bihar be included in the study. As a result, the NCBC dropped the sample survey plan, and the ICSSR then undertook a month-long literature survey.

The ICSSR report concluded that:

- In Haryana, the Jats were educationally backward, although they were financially well-off and well-represented in government posts
- In Delhi, the Jats were educationally backward
- In Himachal Pradesh, Rajasthan, Uttar Pradesh and Uttarakhand, the Jats were educationally backward and under-represented in Government services.

The NCBC, however, disagreed with the report's conclusion about the status of Jats in Haryana. The NCBC found that this conclusion was based on the Justice K.C. Gupta Commission Report, a 2012 report by the Haryana State Backward Commission. According to NCBC, this report was flawed because it based on a "very selective" survey conducted by the Maharishi Dayanand University, Rohtak. It compared Jats only to the forward castes such as Brahmins and Rajputs, but not backward castes such as Ahir and Kurmis. Besides, the villages covered in the survey were not selected independently, but provided by the State Commission. The survey was led by a Jat academic, Professor K. S. Sangwan. Besides, the Vice-Chancellor of the university was also a Jat. In a public hearing conducted by NCBC, these two persons were accused of bias.

Based on this analysis, on 26 February 2014, the NCBC unanimously ruled that the Jats in Haryana did not meet the OBC classification criteria. However, the Cabinet rejected this advice arguing that NCBC had not taken into account "the ground realities". On 4 March 2014, a day before the dates for the 2014 Indian general election were announced, the UPA government included Jats from 9 states in the central OBC quota: Haryana, Gujarat, Delhi, Uttarakhand, Uttar Pradesh, Himachal Pradesh, Rajasthan, Madhya Pradesh and Bihar. In March 2015, the decision was rejected by the Supreme Court of India. The Supreme Court also excluded the Bharatpur and Dholpur Jats of Rajasthan from the Central OBC list.

=== Rajasthan OBC quota ===
Rajasthan is considering to provide reservation to Jaats. On 3 November 1999, the Indian National Congress state government in Rajasthan, led by Ashok Gehlot, included Jats (except those from Bharatpur and Dholpur) in the Rajasthan state OBC list.

A year later, on 10 January 2000, the state government extended the OBC quota to Jats from these two districts as well, bowing to political pressure. 15 years later, on 10 August 2015, the Rajasthan High Court quashed this decision.

=== Haryana SBC quota ===
The mostly non-Jat state BJP is eyeing the divide and its potential as a vote winner.... The agitation has pitted the Jat community against the remaining 35 non-Jat communities.

— The Indian Express

In 1991, the Gurnam Singh Commission report recommended including Jats of Haryana in the state's OBC list. However, the Bhajan Lal-led Congress State Government did not implement these recommendations and Bhajan Lal govt withdrew the notification for reservation for Jats. Two subsequent OBC commissions, in 1995 and 2011 (during INLD's Om Prakash Chautala and Congress's Bhupinder Singh Hooda regimes respectively), also excluded Jats from their list of castes to be classified as OBC.

In 2004, the Congress leader Bhupinder Singh Hooda promised the Jats of Haryana a reserved quota, while campaigning for the 2005 State Assembly elections. The Congress won the 2005 election, as well as the 2009 election in Haryana. A survey conducted in 2012 concluded that the condition of Jats in Haryana was indicative of an upper caste status. Nevertheless, before the 2014 election, the Hooda-led Congress government included Jats (including Sikh Jats) and three other castes (Ror, Tyagi and Bishnoi) in a new "Specially Backward Classes" (SBC) category, and granted them an additional 10% quota in government jobs and educational institutes.

Before the 2014 Indian general elections, BJP had a limited presence in the Haryana state, where the Jats play the dominant political role. In the 2014 general elections, BJP won 7 of the 10 Lok Sabha seats in Haryana. In October 2014, the BJP also won the 2014 Haryana state elections. The BJP rode on a strong anti-incumbency wave against the ruling Congress and the voters' disillusionment with INLD. Both Congress and INLD were led by Jat leaders in Haryana. In both these elections, the INLD got majority of the Jat vote. The BJP won only 19% of the Jat vote in the general elections, and only 17% of the Jat vote in the state assembly elections. The consolidation of non-Jat votes was a factor in BJP's electoral victory. 72% of the BJP's seats were from north and south Haryana, where non-Jats outnumber the Jats; the party won relatively few seats in the Jat-dominated central region.

After coming to power, the BJP appointed Manohar Lal Khattar, a non-Jat, as the state's chief minister. became the first non-Jat chief minister of the state in 18 years, since Bhajan Lal. Anil Vij, his second most prominent colleague, was also a non-Jat. The new Director General of Police and the Chief Secretary were also non-Jats, as were many others in key positions. BJP MP Raj Kumar Saini openly opposed the Jats' efforts to get included in the OBC category, despite party's warnings not to do so. In September 2015, Hawa Singh Sangwan, a leader of the Jat reservation movement, called Khattar a "Pakistani," averring that "the Khattar [led] government did not understand the plight of actual natives of the state." Sangwan was criticized by BJP, Congress and INLD leaders, but refused to apologize for his remarks.

The Jats viewed their loss of political power as disenfranchisement. Nevertheless, the BJP sees the Jats as vital for its electoral success in the forthcoming 2017 Uttar Pradesh elections. In July 2015, when the SBC quota was rejected by the Punjab and Haryana High Court, the BJP government filed a review petition against this decision in Supreme Court.

In March 2015, days after the Supreme Court scrapped a proposal for Jat reservation, BJP leader Subramanian Swamy asked the government to bring an ordinance to provide quota for them.

== Riots ==
Jat leaders from 12 states were present at the meeting held in Delhi [on 3 April 2016]. Awareness rallies will be held in different states including Punjab, Jammu and Kashmir, Maharashtra, Andhra Pradesh and Rajasthan to seek reservation for Jats.

— The Indian Express

In January 2016, Sarva Jat Khap Panchayat (council) of Jats made an elaborate plan for protests demanding reservation quota, down to the exact locations for organizing road and railway blockades.

=== Haryana ===
The Jat riots began in form of non-violent protests but quickly translated into violent riots where hundreds of stores (primarily owned by non-Jat community) were burned in the city of Rohtak. During 12–13 February, the Jats blocked the Delhi-Hisar railway line at Mayyar village in Hisar district. The protest was led by Hawa Singh Sangwan, a retired CRPF commandant and the Haryana chief of the All India Jat Arakshan Sangharsh Samiti. In 2012, Sangwan had organized a similar protest at the same site, as a result of which the Congress government gave community the SBC status. This time, Sangwan demanded a guarantee of OBC status from prominent BJP leaders and action against the BJP leader Raj Kumar Saini for his comments against the Jat demands. He stated that the protest had been organized with an eye on the upcoming Uttar Pradesh elections. The protest was called off by the night of 13 February, after BJP's Jat minister Om Prakash Dhankar assured that the state government will meet their demands by 31 March.

On 14 February, another faction of the community, led by khap leaders mainly Dahiya Khap (from Rohtak, Jhajjar and Sonipat districts), organized a Jat Swabhiman ("self-respect") rally. The khap leaders advised the participants not to organize any more protests until 31 March. However, the majority of the attendees defied their advice, and demanded "immediate and concrete action". They blocked the Delhi-Fazilka National Highway - 10 in protest. By 14 February, the protests had spread to Sonepat, Jhajjar and Bhiwani. During 15–16 February, the Jats organized more non-violent protests and blockades.

Nearly 105 DSIs (daily summary of intelligence) comprising inputs about meetings held by Jat organisations, various khaps and their plans of action were conveyed on a day-to-day basis to government officials during the period (June 2015 to February 39, 2016). The build-up had been reported to the top levels of the Haryana government, including the chief secretary, additional chief secretary (home), police headquarters, range inspector generals and commissioners of police as well as the Intelligence Bureau.

==== Beginning of violence ====
Jats do need reservation
... no rape case will be spared
Jat agitation was peaceful
...Congress plotted bloodshed.

— Abhimanyu Sindhu

On 18 February, 35 Biradari Sangharsh Samiti, a group claiming to represent 35 non-Jat castes organized a protest against the blockades imposed by Jats. They attacked a group of lawyers who were protesting against the JNU row, mistaking them for Jat protesters. The lawyers, who were from several castes, were injured in the clash. The lawyers initially retreated, but subsequently, a larger group of lawyers beat up the Samiti protesters. Following this incident, violence erupted in the state. The agitation turned into a clash between the Jats and the non-Jats.

On the night of 18 February, when the police tried to open a blockade at Pandit Neki Ram Sharma Government College in Rohtak, some people threw stones at them. Following this, the police entered the hostels of Neki Ram College and Jat College, and allegedly beat them up. The police superintendent claimed that the police only used a "mild cane-charge" after stones were pelted at the cops. However, students and professors at Neki Ram College claimed that the police entered the hostels at dinner-time, brutally beat the students after asking them if they were Jats, and threw Dal over them. The next day, Jat youth from nearby rural areas came to Rohtak in large numbers, and protested violently. The protesters blocked several roads, set vehicles to fire and damaged business establishments. A mob of 5000 people, mainly college students, clashed with the police, pelting stones at the office of Inspector General of Police.

==== Escalation to riots ====
It is quite painful that large scale of violence took place during Jat protests that claimed several lives in the state.

— Hawa Singh Sangwan

In Rohtak district, Jat mob set fire to vehicles, shops and a petrol pump at Kalanaur.

From Rohtak, the Jat violence spread to Jhajjar. On 20 February, the Jats allegedly burnt the shops belonging to Punjabis (Khatris) and Sainis. The security personnel deployed to control the violence opened fire, killing 4 Jat youths. The Punjabis and Sainis later retaliated by vandalizing the Chhotu Ram dharamshala of the Jats. On 21 February, the Jats attacked the Chhavani Mohalla, where they targeted shops, vehicles and houses belonging to Sainis, Nais and other backward castes. Besides the 4 Jat youths killed earlier, 7 Sainis, 1 Kumhar and 1 Halwai were killed by Jat in the resulting violence. A statue of Rao Tula Ram was also vandalized, resulting in protests from Ahirs.

The protesters blocked highways and other roads in Chandigarh, Karnal, Kaithal and districts. Railway tracks in Panipat and Sonipat were damaged and uprooted at several places between New Delhi and Ambala.

Violent incidents by Jats were reported at several places in the state:

- In Bhiwani district, the house BJP MP Dharambir was vandalized and several buses were set on fire in Tosham. In Loharu, an ATM and the official records of a cooperative bank were burnt. Police chowkis (outposts) at Mundal and Kharak were also set on fire.
- In Faridabad district, the protesters clashed with police near Ballabhgarh. The police also beat up some journalists.
- In Sonipat district, the railway station at Ganaur was vandalized
- In Sonipat district, the protesters vandalized a hotel and a college owned by a Member of Parliament (MP); they also set fire to a rice mill.
- In Sonipat Gohana, a mobs burnt several shops and vehicles.

As the rioters shut down water canals, the protests also resulted in a severe water crisis in Gurgaon as well as the neighbouring Delhi.

By 22 February, 12 people had been killed by rioters, and property worth more than ₹200 billion (US$2.1 billion) had been damaged. On 23 February 2016, chief minister Manohar Lal Khattar was heckled by a mob during a press conference.

==== Epilogue of February agitation ====
The Army and paramilitary forces were deployed in large numbers to control the situation, though, even the Army's effectiveness was questioned.

The Government pacified the Jats by setting up a committee to look into their demand, and indicating to lay out reservation for Jats, Sikh Jats, Rors, Tyagis and Bishnois by erecting a new "agrarian classes" category.

A "probe panel" was constituted by the government to "find commissions and omissions on part of police and administrative officials," appointing the former Director General of Police Prakash Singh as its principal investigator. Singh has questioned the functioning of the police department as well as the military, during the agitation period. In the words of Singh:

You would have seen cops running away, but wouldn't have ever seen army running away."

However, the Army did rescue 29 foreign nationals, including 26 Japanese and three Swedish, who were stuck in the state because of protests.

==== Summer 2016 ====
On 25 May 2016, the All India Jat Aarkshan Sangharsh Samiti (AIJASS) leaders addressed the Jats at Jat Dharamshala in Jind, appealing the Jats to start nationwide protests from 5 June, and beseeched the "state police and civil officials indicted by the Prakash Singh committee to fight against the government." Later, six Jat leaders including Yashpal Malik were charged by police on accusations of sedition and "promoting enmity between groups on the basis of caste." Police has also lodged First Information Reports against 100 anonymous people who were present at the rally.

On 29 May 2016, the national executive of the All India Jat Aarkshan Sangharsh Samiti held an emergency meeting, promulgating "Jat Nyay" (Jat Justice) rally in Haryana from 5 June, accusing Manohar Lal Khattar led government of failing to honour its promises towards the Jat community.

As of 26 May 2016, troops of Central Armed Police Forces and Central Reserve Police Forces have been already put into positions in Haryana. The Haryana police is being provided training to predominate a rampage situation, using "modern and useful weapons."

We will hold 'Jat Nyay' rally in Haryana from June 5 as promises made by Haryana Chief Minister Manohar Lal Khattar have not been fulfilled.
We were promised that those arrested during the Jat quota stir earlier will be released and compensation given to kin of those killed or the injured. We will hold a peaceful protest, but if police retaliates or tries to stop us by using violence, the protestors are free to take their call.

— Yashpal Malik on 25 May 2016

The AIJASS resumed the protests on 5 June, however, the government was able to convince the AIJASS to pause the protests after guaranteeing to "look into" their behests.

In the first week of July, the Muslim Jat community, organised by the All India Muslim Jat Arakashan Sangharsh Samiti, and the Sikh Jat community also came forward to join the legal battle in defence of the "Haryana Backward Classes (Reservation in Services and Admission in Educational Institutions) Bill."

=== Rajasthan ===
The protests also spread to the Bharatpur district of Rajasthan on 22 February. The Jats blocked railway tracks and the Jaipur-Agra national highway. They clashed with the police, and damaged state roadways buses. The State Government requested 28 companies of para-military forces from the Central Government.

Chief Minister Vasundhara Raje of BJP appealed the Jats to maintain peace, and stated that her government had already constituted a commission to look into the Jats' demand for reservation.

== Reactions ==
Several Jat leaders condemned the violence, and asked the community to maintain law and order. Some Jats, such as the owners of Neelkanth Star Dhaba in Murthal, provided free food and lodging to those stuck on highways because of the protests. Sikh volunteers organized langar (free food) and provided free blankets to those stranded on the Delhi-Ambala highway. Congress leader and All India Jat Mahasabha president Amarinder Singh demanded that Prime Minister Narendra Modi file a review petition against the Supreme Court judgment that quashed the inclusion of Jats from 9 states in the Central OBC list. At the same time, he condemned violence by Jats, and requested the community not to protest violently. Columnist and social activist Shivanshu K. Srivastava wrote that "By an estimation, the Jats own three-fourths of the agricultural land in Haryana. Notwithstanding their self-standing, the Haryana Government agreed to give 10% reservations to the Jats."

Yeshpal Malik, the president of the Akhil Bhartiya Jat Arakshan Sangharsh Samiti ("All-India Jat Reservation Struggle Committee"), blamed the BJP and BJP-affiliated groups for inciting the violence. He accused the BJP leaders of hatching a conspiracy against the Jats, naming Rajkumar Saini in particular.

The Bahujan Samaj Party president Mayawati extended full support to the demand of reservation by the Jat community and said the Bharatiya Janata Party government in Haryana should consider it sympathetically and implement it immediately. Baba Ramdev supported Jat Reservation but appealed to the protesters to run the movement peacefully. He added that since he belongs to Haryana, he understands the sentiments of people from his home state.

The BJP government announced formation of a committee chaired by M. Venkaiah Naidu to look into the Jats' demands for reservation.

Kartar Singh, the Haryana chief of Rashtriya Swayamsevak Sangh, has opined to media that had he been the state's Chief Minister, he "would have ordered shooting of Jat protesters."

Affirming former Haryana cabinet minister Captain Ajay Yadav's statement that the "Jats got the reservation at gunpoint," Hawa Singh Sangwan said that "no revolution was possible without struggle .... people of several states like Telangana, Nagaland and Mizoram had to struggle a lot before coming into existence and if Jats did it to fight for their legitimate rights, they did no wrong in achieving it."

== See also ==
- Mandal Commission protests of 1990
- 2017 Haryana riots
