= 2016 African & Oceania Wrestling Olympic Qualification Tournament =

Third regional qualifying tournament for the 2016 Olympics

The 2016 Olympic Wrestling African & Oceania Qualification Tournament was the third regional qualifying tournament for the 2016 Olympics.

The top two wrestlers in each weight class earn a qualification spot for their nation.

== Men's freestyle ==
=== 57 kg ===
3 April

Round of 16
Mbundé Cumba (GBS)	7
Sem Shilimela (NAM)	17
Aaron Maher (AUS)	1
Abdelhak Kherbache (ALG)	12
Cristian Nicolescu (PLW)	0
Chakir Ansari (MAR)	10

Quarterfinals
Adama Diatta (SEN)	7
Ebikewenimo Welson (NGR)	2
Prince Mbambi (CGO)	0
Chedli Mathlouthi (TUN)	12
Mohamed Maghawri (EGY)	8^{F}
Sem Shilimela (NAM)	0
Abdelhak Kherbache (ALG)	1
Chakir Ansari (MAR)	7^{F}

Semifinals
Adama Diatta (SEN)	4
Chedli Mathlouthi (TUN)	0
Mohamed Maghawri (EGY)	0
Chakir Ansari (MAR)	10^{F}

Final
Adama Diatta (SEN)	10
Chakir Ansari (MAR)	0

Repechage round 1
Cristian Nicolescu (PLW)	2
Abdelhak Kherbache (ALG)	12

Bronze medals
Ebikewenimo Welson (NGR)	1
Chedli Mathlouthi (TUN)	8^{F}
Abdelhak Kherbache (ALG)	4
Mohamed Maghawri (EGY)	6

- Mohamed Maghawri originally finished third, but was later disqualified for doping.

=== 65 kg ===
3 April

Round of 16
Bilal El-Ouarraqe (MAR)	13
Guy Alain Lago (CIV)	3
Sahit Prizreni (AUS)	10
Faly Randrianantoandro (MAD)	0
Jason Afrikaner (NAM)	2^{F}
Jean Bernard Diatta (SEN)	6
Haithem Dakhlaoui (TUN)	10
Jarvis Tarkong (PLW)	0

Quarterfinals
Zouheir Iftene (ALG)	0
Amas Daniel (NGR)	10
Ibrahim Farag (EGY)	10
Carlitos Tutu (GBS)	0
Bilal El-Ouarraqe (MAR)	6
Sahit Prizreni (AUS)	11
Jason Afrikaner (NAM)	10
Haithem Dakhlaoui (TUN)	4

Semifinals
Amas Daniel (NGR)	8
Ibrahim Farag (EGY)	1
Sahit Prizreni (AUS)	11^{F}
Jason Afrikaner (NAM)	2

Final
Amas Daniel (NGR)	8
Sahit Prizreni (AUS)	8

Repechage round 1
Faly Randrianantoandro (MAD)	1
Bilal El-Ouarraqe (MAR)	12

Bronze medals
Zouheir Iftene (ALG)
Ibrahim Farag (EGY)	WO
Bilal El-Ouarraqe (MAR)	WO
Jason Afrikaner (NAM)

=== 74 kg ===
3 April

Round of 16
Augusto Midana (GBS)	10
Yassine Sardi (MAR)	0

Quarterfinals
Gilbert Emilie (MRI)	0
Ayad Ibrahim (EGY)	10^{F}
Talgat Ilyasov (AUS)	12
Ali Ayari (TUN)	1
Melvin Bibo (NGR)	11
Mohamed Boudraa (ALG)	0
Noël Mboumba (CGO)	0
Augusto Midana (GBS)	10

Semifinals
Ayad Ibrahim (EGY)	1
Talgat Ilyasov (AUS)	9^{F}
Melvin Bibo (NGR)	0
Augusto Midana (GBS)	4

Final
Talgat Ilyasov (AUS)	3
Augusto Midana (GBS)	6

Repechage round 1
Yassine Sardi (MAR)	8
Noël Mboumba (CGO)	2

Bronze medals
Ali Ayari (TUN)	4
Ayad Ibrahim (EGY)	8
Yassine Sardi (MAR)	0^{R}
Melvin Bibo (NGR)	2

=== 86 kg ===
3 April

Round of 16
Mohamed Zaghloul (EGY)	6^{F}
Nathaniel Tuamoheloa (ASA)	0
Cheikh Tidiane Niang (SEN)	10
Abdulai Salam (SLE)	1
J. K. Kaminanga (FSM)	0
Djakna Malick (CHA)	10

Quarterfinals
Quintino Intipe (GBS)	7^{F}
Abderrahmane Benacha (ALG)	1
Mohamed Saadaoui (TUN)	13
Connor Evans (AUS)	2
Mohamed Karbou (MAR)	0
Mohamed Zaghloul (EGY)	10
Cheikh Tidiane Niang (SEN)	12
Djakna Malick (CHA)	12

Semifinals
Quintino Intipe (GBS)	1
Mohamed Saadaoui (TUN)	12
Mohamed Zaghloul (EGY)	10
Cheikh Tidiane Niang (SEN)	0

Final
Mohamed Saadaoui (TUN)	1^{R}
Mohamed Zaghloul (EGY)	4

Repechage round 1
Nathaniel Tuamoheloa (ASA)	2^{F}
Mohamed Karbou (MAR)	0

Bronze medals
Connor Evans (AUS)	1
Quintino Intipe (GBS)	4^{F}
Nathaniel Tuamoheloa (ASA)	4^{F}
Cheikh Tidiane Niang (SEN)	0

=== 97 kg ===
3 April

Quarterfinals		Semifinals		Final
Lounès Bouzid (ALG)	0
Soso Tamarau (NGR)	11	Soso Tamarau (NGR)	12
Basile Dieudonné (CHA)	0	Cédric Nyamsi (CMR)	5
Cédric Nyamsi (CMR)	12			Soso Tamarau (NGR)	3
Aly Hamdy (EGY)	2^{F}			Aly Hamdy (EGY)	1
Alex Paul Akpi (CIV)	0	Aly Hamdy (EGY)	10
Bedopassa Buassat (GBS)	12	Bedopassa Buassat (GBS)	0
Anas El-Mkabber (MAR)	2

Bronze medals
Lounès Bouzid (ALG)	10
Cédric Nyamsi (CMR)	0
Alex Paul Akpi (CIV)	0
Bedopassa Buassat (GBS)	7^{F}

- Aly Hamdy originally qualified for the Olympics, but was later disqualified for doping, giving the spot to Bedopassa Buassat.

=== 125 kg ===
3 April

Quarterfinals		Semifinals		Final
Reda Hinani (MAR)	0
Thiacka Faye (SEN)	11^{F}	Thiacka Faye (SEN)	4
Mohamed Bendjilali (ALG)	0	Slim Trabelsi (TUN)	2^{F}
Slim Trabelsi (TUN)	10			Slim Trabelsi (TUN)	3
Marcus Carney (NZL)	10			Diaaeldin Kamal (EGY)	13
Maurice Abatam (CHA)	0	Marcus Carney (NZL)	0
Florian Skilang Temengil (PLW)	0	Diaaeldin Kamal (EGY)	2^{F}
Diaaeldin Kamal (EGY)	10

Bronze medals
Mohamed Bendjilali (ALG)	2
Thiacka Faye (SEN)	1
Florian Skilang Temengil (PLW)	9^{F}
Marcus Carney (NZL)	3

== Men's Greco-Roman ==
=== 59 kg ===
1 April

Pos	Athlete	Pld	W	L	CP	TP	EGY	MAR	ALG
1	Haithem Mahmoud (EGY)	2	2	0	7	15	—	8–0	7–0
2	Mehdi Messaoudi (MAR)	2	1	1	3	8	0–4 ST	—	8–6
3	Billel Benbrih (ALG)	2	0	2	1	6	0–3 PO	1–3 PP	—

Source: UWW

=== 66 kg ===
1 April

Quarterfinals
Lukas Thomas (NAM)	0
Adham Ahmed Saleh (EGY)	9
Souleymen Nasr (TUN)	7
Bilal El-Bahja (MAR)	3

Semifinals
Vinod Kumar Dahiya (AUS)	12
Craig Miller (NZL)	6
Adham Ahmed Saleh (EGY)	11
Souleymen Nasr (TUN)	2

Final
Vinod Kumar Dahiya (AUS)	0
Adham Ahmed Saleh (EGY)	10

Bronze medals
Bye
Craig Miller (NZL)
Lukas Thomas (NAM)	8
Souleymen Nasr (TUN)	0

- Vinod Kumar Dahiya originally qualified for the Olympics, but was later disqualified for doping, giving the spot to Craig Miller.

=== 75 kg ===
1 April

Pos	Athlete	Pld	W	L	CP	TP	MAR	EGY	ALG	TUN
1	Zied Ayet Ikram (MAR)	3	3	0	11	23	—	8–0	5–4	10–0
2	Mahmoud Fawzy (EGY)	3	2	1	8	14	0–4 ST	—	10–2	4–0 Fall
3	Akrem Boudjemline (ALG)	3	1	2	6	14	1–3 PP	1–4 SP	—	8–0
4	Wael Selmi (TUN)	3	0	3	0	0	0–4 ST	0–4 VT	0–4 ST	—

Source: UWW

=== 85 kg ===
1 April

Quarterfinals		Semifinals		Final
		Khalid Sahli (MAR)	0
Nathaniel Tuamoheloa (ASA)	0	Adem Boudjemline (ALG)	8
Adem Boudjemline (ALG)	10			Adem Boudjemline (ALG)	3
Skander Missaoui (TUN)	9			Ahmed Othman (EGY)	4
J. K. Kaminanga (FSM)	0	Skander Missaoui (TUN)	1
Nick Verreynne (AUS)	0	Ahmed Othman (EGY)	9
Ahmed Othman (EGY)	8

Bronze medals
Nathaniel Tuamoheloa (ASA)	5
Khalid Sahli (MAR)	8
Nick Verreynne (AUS)	0
Skander Missaoui (TUN)	8

=== 98 kg ===
1 April

Pos	Athlete	Pld	W	L	CP	TP	EGY	ALG	MAR
1	Hamdy Abdelwahab (EGY)	2	2	0	6	9	—	5–2	4–0
2	Hamza Haloui (ALG)	2	1	1	4	6	1–3 PP	—	4–0
3	Choucri Atafi (MAR)	2	0	2	0	0	0–3 PO	0–3 PO	—

Source: UWW

=== 130 kg ===
1 April

Quarterfinals
Abdellatif Mohamed (EGY)	8
Reda Hinani (MAR)	0
Marcus Carney (NZL)	0
Radhouane Chebbi (TUN)	8

Semifinals
Ivan Popov (AUS)	10^{F}
Ali Bouachium (ALG)	5
Abdellatif Mohamed (EGY)	4
Radhouane Chebbi (TUN)	0

Final
Ivan Popov (AUS)	0
Abdellatif Mohamed (EGY)	10

Bronze medals
Bye
Ali Bouachium (ALG)
Reda Hinani (MAR)	0
Radhouane Chebbi (TUN)	8

== Women's freestyle ==
=== 48 kg ===
2 April

Pos	Athlete	Pld	W	L	CP	TP	NGR	CMR	ALG	AUS
1	Mercy Genesis (NGR)	3	3	0	11	27	—	7–2	10–0	10–0 Fall
2	Rebecca Muambo (CMR)	3	2	1	8	14	1–3 PP	—	8–0	4–0 Fall
3	Hanene Salaouandji (ALG)	3	1	2	4	3	0–4 ST	0–3 PO	—	3–2 Fall
4	Jessica Lavers-McBain (AUS)	3	0	3	0	2	0–4 VT	0–4 VT	0–4 VT	—

Source: UWW

=== 53 kg ===
2 April

Pos	Athlete	Pld	W	L	CP	TP	SEN	CMR	TUN	ALG	AUS
1	Isabelle Sambou (SEN)	4	4	0	15	28	—	2–0 Fall	9–0	7–2 Fall	10–0
2	Joseph Essombe (CMR)	4	3	1	10	25	0–4 VT	—	8–6	7–6	10–0
3	Maroi Mezien (TUN)	4	2	2	9	14	0–3 PO	1–3 PP	—	8–0 Fall	WO
4	Chaima Yahiaoui (ALG)	4	1	3	5	12	0–4 VT	1–3 PP	0–4 VT	—	4–2 Fall
5	Pia Rosenkranz (AUS)	4	0	4	0	2	0–4 ST	0–4 ST	0–4 VB	0–4 VT	—

Source: UWW

=== 58 kg ===
2 April

Quarterfinals
Safiétou Goudiaby (SEN)	7
Krissy Hunter (NZL)	1
Edwige Ngono (CMR)	0
Aminat Adeniyi (NGR)	10

Semifinals
Rabia Lamalsa (ALG)	3
Marwa Amri (TUN)	13
Safiétou Goudiaby (SEN)	0
Aminat Adeniyi (NGR)	3^{F}

Final
Marwa Amri (TUN)	10
Aminat Adeniyi (NGR)	0

Bronze medals
Bye
Rabia Lamalsa (ALG)
Edwige Ngono (CMR)	0
Safiétou Goudiaby (SEN)	9

=== 63 kg ===
2 April

Quarterfinals		Semifinals		Final
Stevie Kelly (AUS)	0
Blessing Oborududu (NGR)	10	Blessing Oborududu (NGR)	10
Amina Benabderrahmane (ALG)	5^{F}	Amina Benabderrahmane (ALG)	0
Ilania Keju (MHL)	1			Blessing Oborududu (NGR)	7
Hela Riabi (TUN)	8^{F}			Hela Riabi (TUN)	8
Tayla Ford (NZL)	4	Hela Riabi (TUN)	6^{F}
Anta Sambou (SEN)	4	Anta Sambou (SEN)	0
Berthe Etane Ngolle (CMR)	2

Bronze medals
Stevie Kelly (AUS)	12
Amina Benabderrahmane (ALG)	2
Tayla Ford (NZL)	4^{F}
Anta Sambou (SEN)	0

=== 69 kg ===
2 April

Quarterfinals
Syrine Issaoui (TUN)	4
Demos Memneloum (CHA)	7
Enas Mostafa (EGY)	10
Blandine Metala (CMR)	4

Semifinals
Hannah Reuben (NGR)	10
Houria Boukrif (ALG)	0
Demos Memneloum (CHA)	0
Enas Mostafa (EGY)	8^{F}

Final
Hannah Reuben (NGR)	8
Enas Mostafa (EGY)	2

Bronze medals
Bye
Houria Boukrif (ALG)
Blandine Metala (CMR)	11
Demos Memneloum (CHA)	0

=== 75 kg ===
2 April

Quarterfinals		Semifinals		Final
		Hajaratu Kamara (SLE)	0
Tassadit Amer (ALG)	0	Samar Amer (EGY)	2^{F}
Samar Amer (EGY)	12^{F}			Samar Amer (EGY)	4
Shantelle Thompson (AUS)	0			Annabelle Ali (CMR)	5
Annabelle Ali (CMR)	12	Annabelle Ali (CMR)	4
Wiem Trabelsi (TUN)	0	Blessing Onyebuchi (NGR)	3
Blessing Onyebuchi (NGR)	10^{F}

Bronze medals
Tassadit Amer (ALG)	WO
Hajaratu Kamara (SLE)
Shantelle Thompson (AUS)	0
Blessing Onyebuchi (NGR)	12
