= Craig Miller (wrestler) =

New Zealand wrestler

Personal information
- Born: 10 June 1985 (age 41) Dunedin, New Zealand
- Education: Kavanagh College

Professional wrestling career
- Billed height: 173 cm (68 in)
- Billed weight: 146 lb (66 kg)

Craig Miller (born 10 June 1985 in Dunedin) is a New Zealand wrestler.

== Early years ==
He attended Kavanagh College, where he first began wrestling in 2002.

== Wrestling career ==
He competed at the 2014 Commonwealth Games for New Zealand in freestyle wrestling where he placed 7 out of 16 competitors in the 65kg division.

He then retired from freestyle wrestling to concentrate on Greco-Roman wrestling. He competed in the African & Oceania Olympic qualifying in Algeria in April 2016, losing in a semi final to Australian Vinod Kumar Dahiya.

On 19 July 2016 he was added to the New Zealand team for the 2016 Summer Olympics after Dahiya was suspended for doping violations. He was due to compete in the men's 66 kg division, but received a knee injury during training in Rio de Janeiro and withdrew before the competition started.
