= Malik (clan) =

Family name

Malik or Malak is a gotra of Jats found in Pakistan and India. The Malik Jats were originally called Ghatwal (or Gathwala). They later began calling themselves malik ("lord"). They were zamindars (landowners) during the Mughal era.

The Malik Jats formed a prominent khap which was backed by the Mughal empire to oppose Rajput chiefs in Haryana. The Maliks were so successful that they alarmed other local groups. The Dahiya Jats would lead a coalition of disaffected Jats, Rajputs and Gurjars, against the ascending Maliks. The Dahiya-Malik rivalry continued into the 19th century. In Western Uttar Pradesh, the Salaklan and Baliyan Jat khaps would also ally with local Gurjars and Ranghars to oppose the Malik Jats. The Malik Jat khap continues to operate today, and is often the subject of controversy.
