= Sonipat =

Sonipat Svarnaprastha
- City
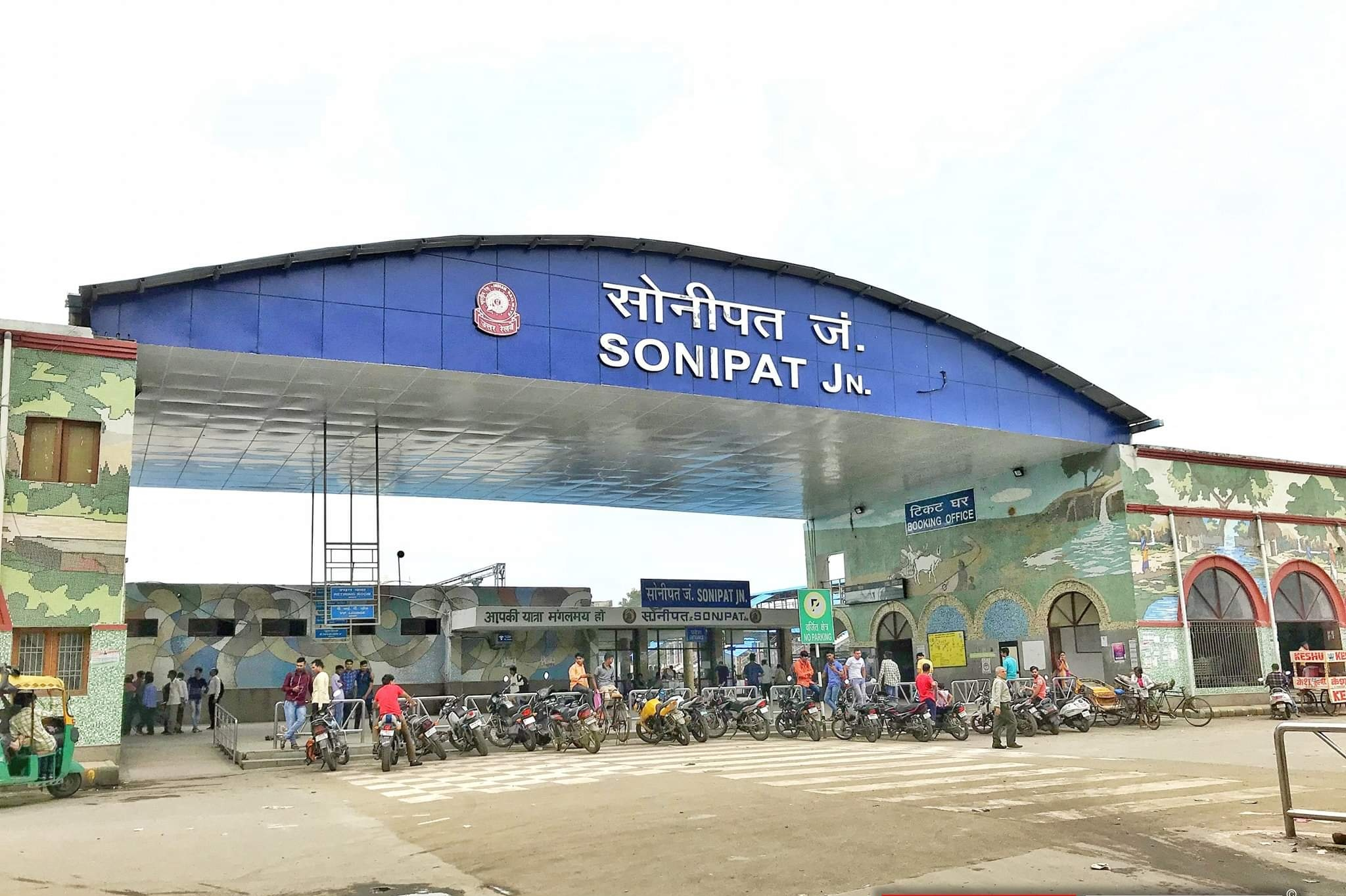
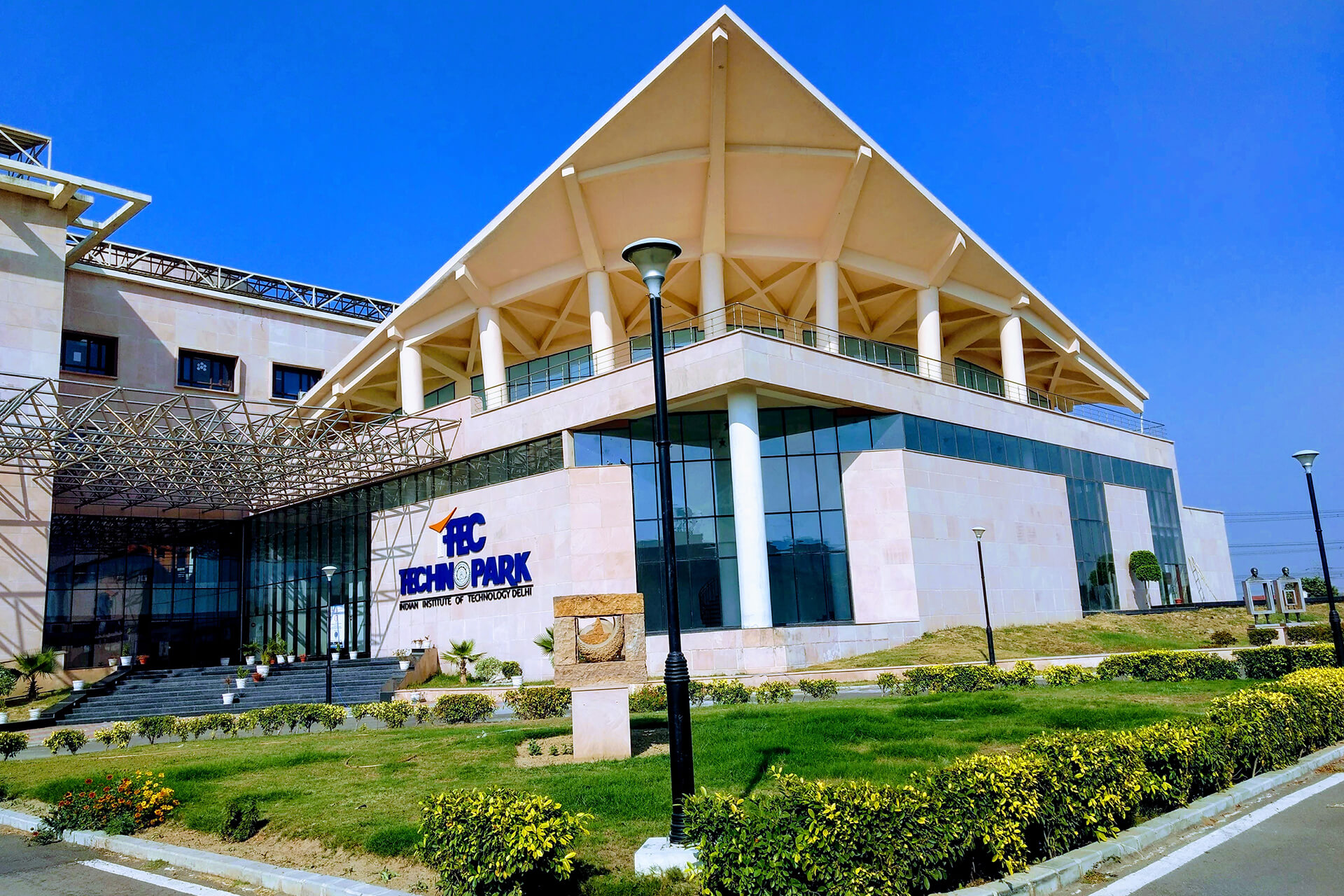
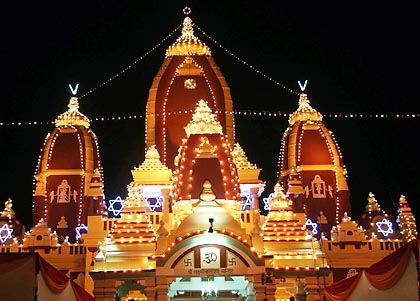
- Sonipat Junction railway station, Technology Park and Mata Chintapurni Mandir in Sonipat, Haryana

- Location in Haryana, India Sonipat (India)
- Coordinates: 28.990°N 77.022°E
- Country: India
- State: Haryana
- Division: Rohtak
- District: Sonipat

Government
  - Type: Municipal corporation
  - Body: Sonipat Municipal Corporation
  - Mayor: Rajeev Jain (BJP)
  - Lok Sabha MP: Satpal Brahamchari (INC)
  - MLA: Nikhil Madaan (BJP)
  - Municipal Commissioner: Sunita Verma, IAS

Area
  - Total: 181 km^{2} (70 sq mi)
- Elevation: 224.15 m (735.4 ft)

Population
  - Total: 277,053

Languages
  - Official: Hindi
  - Additional official: Punjabi
  - Regional: Haryanvi
- Time zone: UTC+5.30 (Indian Standard Time)
- PIN: 131001
- Telephone Code: +91-130
- ISO 3166 code: IN-HR
- Vehicle registration: HR-10, HR-69(Commercial Vehicles), HR-99(Temporary), DL-14 Sonipat (Delhi NCR), HR-86
- Sex Ratio: 1.19
- Effective literacy: 85.48%
- Website: sonipat.gov.in

Sonipat is a planned industrial city and administrative headquarter in Sonipat district of Haryana state of India. It comes under the National Capital Region and is around 45 kilometres (28 mi) from New Delhi. It lies 214 km (128 miles) southwest of Chandigarh, the state capital. The Yamuna River runs along its eastern boundary. Sonipat was historically known as Swarnprastha.

On 22 December 1972, Sonipat was designated a full-fledged district. Sonipat Junction railway station is the main railway junction on Delhi-Kalka line. It lies on Delhi Western Peripheral Expressway, Eastern Peripheral Expressway (NE II) and Grand Trunk Road (NH 44) as well as the planned Delhi–Sonipat–Panipat Regional Rapid Transit System.

== Etymology ==
According to legend, Sonipat was earlier known as Swarnprastha, (lit. 'Golden City'). which later on became Swarnpath, and then Sonipat.

== History ==
References to the city are found in the epic Mahabharata as Svarnaprastha. It was one of the five villages demanded by Pandavas as the price of peace from Duryodhan in lieu of the kingdom Hastinapur. The other four villages were Panduprastha (Panipat), Vyaghraprastha (Baghpat), Tilaprastha (Tilpat) and Indraprastha (Delhi).

Sonipat is listed in the Ain-i-Akbari as a pargana under Delhi sarkar, producing a revenue of 7,727,323 dam coins for the imperial treasury and supplying a force of 1000 infantry and 70 cavalry. It had a brick fort at the time, which was also mentioned.

Sonipat came under Islamic rule after the Second Battle of Tarain in 1193. The Sikhs under Banda Singh Bahadur fought the Battle of Sonipat against the Mughals in 1709. Khanda village witnessed the Battle of Sonipat and won the battle against Mughals under the military leadership of Banda Singh Bahadur.

== Geography and topography ==
Sonipat is located at 28.98°N 77.02°E.

=== Climate ===
Climate data for Sonipat
| Month | Jan | Feb | Mar | Apr | May | Jun | Jul | Aug | Sep | Oct | Nov | Dec | Year |
|---|---|---|---|---|---|---|---|---|---|---|---|---|---|
| Mean daily maximum °C (°F) | 21 (70) | 24 (75) | 30 (86) | 37 (99) | 40 (104) | 38 (100) | 35 (95) | 34 (93) | 34 (93) | 33 (91) | 28 (82) | 22 (72) | 31 (88) |
| Mean daily minimum °C (°F) | 8 (46) | 11 (52) | 16 (61) | 22 (72) | 27 (81) | 28 (82) | 28 (82) | 27 (81) | 26 (79) | 21 (70) | 14 (57) | 9 (48) | 20 (68) |
| Average rainfall mm (inches) | 19.7 (0.78) | 24.6 (0.97) | 24.6 (0.97) | 10.1 (0.40) | 40.7 (1.60) | 96.9 (3.81) | 190 (7.5) | 201 (7.9) | 134.3 (5.29) | 12 (0.5) | 4 (0.2) | 10 (0.4) | 767.9 (30.32) |
| Average relative humidity (%) | 66 | 58 | 47 | 32 | 35 | 53 | 68 | 71 | 66 | 55 | 51 | 63 | 55 |
Source: https://www.worldweatheronline.com/sonipat-weather-averages/haryana/in.aspx

== Demographics ==
According to the 2011 Indian Census provisional reports, population of Sonipat in 2011 is 277,053. The total number of literates in Sonipat city is 215,609, of which 121,821 are males while 93,788 are females. The effective average literacy rate of Sonipat is 87.56 percent of which male and female literacy was 93.21 and 81.17 percent. The sex ratio of Sonipat city is 873 per 1000 males. The child sex ratio of girls is 788 per 1000 boys.

=== Religion ===
==== City ====
Religion in Sonipat City
| Religion | Population (1911) | Percentage (1911) | Population (1941) | Percentage (1941) | Population (2023) | Percentage (2023) |
|---|---|---|---|---|---|---|
| Hinduism (Note: 1941 census: Including Ad-Dharmis) | 4,794 | 39.9% | 7,706 | 43.34% | 270,837 | 93.61 % |
| Islam | 6,510 | 54.19% | 8,933 | 50.24% | 11,394 | 3.94% |
| Jain | Not known | Not known | Not known | Not known | 3,532 | 1.22 % |
| Sikhism | 6 | 0.05% | 226 | 1.27% | 1,903 | 0.66 % |
| Christianity | 56 | 0.47% | 13 | 0.07% | 484 | 0.17 % |
| Others (Note: Including Jainism, Buddhism, Zoroastrianism, Judaism, or not stated) | 648 | 5.39% | 903 | 5.08% | 1,008 | 0.35 % |
| Total Population | 12,014 | 100% | 17,781 | 100% | 382,000 | 100% |

==== Tehsil (district) ====
Religion in Sonipat Tehsil (District)
| Religion | Population (1941) | Percentage (1941) | Population (2023) | Percentage (2023) |
|---|---|---|---|---|
| Hinduism | 176,709 | 81.81% | 1,584,770 | 95.87% |
| Islam | 35,275 | 16.33% | 51,414 | 3.11% |
| Jain | Not Known | Not known | 6,878 | 0.41% |
| Sikhism | 613 | 0.28% | 5,112 | 0.30% |
| Christianity | 724 | 0.34% | 1,602 | 0.09% |
| Others (Note: Including Jainism, Buddhism, Zoroastrianism, Judaism, or not stated) | 2,687 | 1.24% | 3226 | 0.19% |
| Total Population | 216,008 | 100% | 1,653,001 | 100% |

== Government and politics ==
=== Municipal corporation ===
Sonipat Municipal Corporation is the governing civic body of the Urban Area in Sonipat. The Municipal Committee Sonipat was established in the year 1933.

=== Sonipat Lok Sabha ===
Sonipat (Lok Sabha constituency) is one of the 10 Lok Sabha (parliamentary) constituencies in Haryana state in northern India. Satpal Brahmchari from Congress party (INC) is Member of Parliament from Sonipat Seat

== Places of interest ==
=== Mughal architecture ===
There are several Mughal buildings on the outskirts of the city, including the Mosque of Abdullah Nasir-ud-din, who was a descendant from Mushid of Iran.

=== Yamuna River ===
The main water system in the district is the Yamuna River and its irrigation canals. The river flows besides the rural belt in the eastern side of district. It also acts as a natural boundary between the states of Haryana and Uttar Pradesh.

== Economy ==
=== Industrial estates ===
There are six HSIIDC industrial estates namely Sonepat city, Barhi, Kundli, Murthal and Rai. The development of Sonepat Industrial area in the city started in the 1950s with Atlas Cycle. Since then, many small and big industries have been established here. Atlas, E.C.E. or the Birla Factory, OSRAM India (formerly part of E.C.E., but in October 1998 it was acquired by OSRAM).

Rail Coach Naveenikaran Karkhana, Sonipat is a railway coach factory under RVNL which was successfully commissioned in October 2021.The Rail Coach Naveenikaran Karkhana at Sonipat is the first of its kind facility being set up to cater to the mid-life rehabilitation and refurbishment of coaches. The Rolling Stock Complex is designed for sustainable development with Industry 4.0 compliant assembly line.

== Transport ==
The Ministry of Road Transport and Highways proposed the first bus port in Sector 7, Sonipat. It will be a joint venture between the Government of Haryana and NHAI.

The proposed bus stand will be an ultra-modern 'bus port', with infrastructure at par with an international airport.

== Education ==
=== Colleges ===
- Central Institute of Petrochemicals Engineering & Technology

=== Universities ===
- Indian Institute of Information Technology, Sonepat
- Dr. B.R. Ambedkar National Law University, Sonipat (NLU)
- National Institute of Food Technology Entrepreneurship and Management
- Deenbandhu Chhotu Ram University Of Science and Technology
- Ashoka University
- O. P. Jindal Global University
- Bhagat Phool Singh Mahila Vishwavidyalaya
- SRM University, Haryana
- World University of Design
- Rishihood University

== Sports ==
In July 1973 the government established the Motilal Nehru School of Sports, Rai, Sonipat to provide education facilities with extra emphasis on sports. It trains athletes in field hockey, basketball, lawn tennis, equestrianism, gymnastics, swimming, shooting sports, volleyball, boxing, cricket, and football.

== Notable people ==
- Seema Antil (discus thrower)
- Sanchit Balhara (Bollywood score composer)
- Preeti Bose (cricketer)
- Manushi Chhillar (actress, model and the winner of Miss World 2017)
- Amit Kumar Dahiya (Olympian wrestler)
- Hoshiar Singh Dahiya (PVC)
- Jai Tirath Dahiya (leader)
- Kushal Singh Dahiya (martyr)
- Mehar Singh Dahiya (martyr poet)
- Padam Singh Dahiya (politician)
- Ravi Kumar Dahiya (Silver medalist Olympics, Wrestling)
- Rizak Ram Dahiya (MP Rajya Sabha, ex. MLA Rai)
- Rohit Dahiya (cricketer)
- Vikas Dahiya (Indian hockey player)
- Vinod Kumar Dahiya (Olympian wrestler)
- Vivek Dahiya (actor)
- Yogeshwar Dutt (wrestler)
- Krishna Gahlawat (MLA Rai and former minister)
- Himanshu Malik (Bollywood actor)
- Jitender Malik (politician)
- Meghna Malik (actress)
- Pardeep Narwal (kabaddi player)
- Sanjay Pahal (cricketer)
- Rajat Paliwal (cricketer)
- Rampal (spiritual leader)
- Nisha Warsi (hockey player)

== See also ==
- Battle of Sonipat
- Bahadurgarh
- Gurgaon
- Khanda
- Satlok Ashram
- Sehri, Haryana
