= Battle of Sonipat =

1709 battle

- Part of Mughal-Sikh Wars
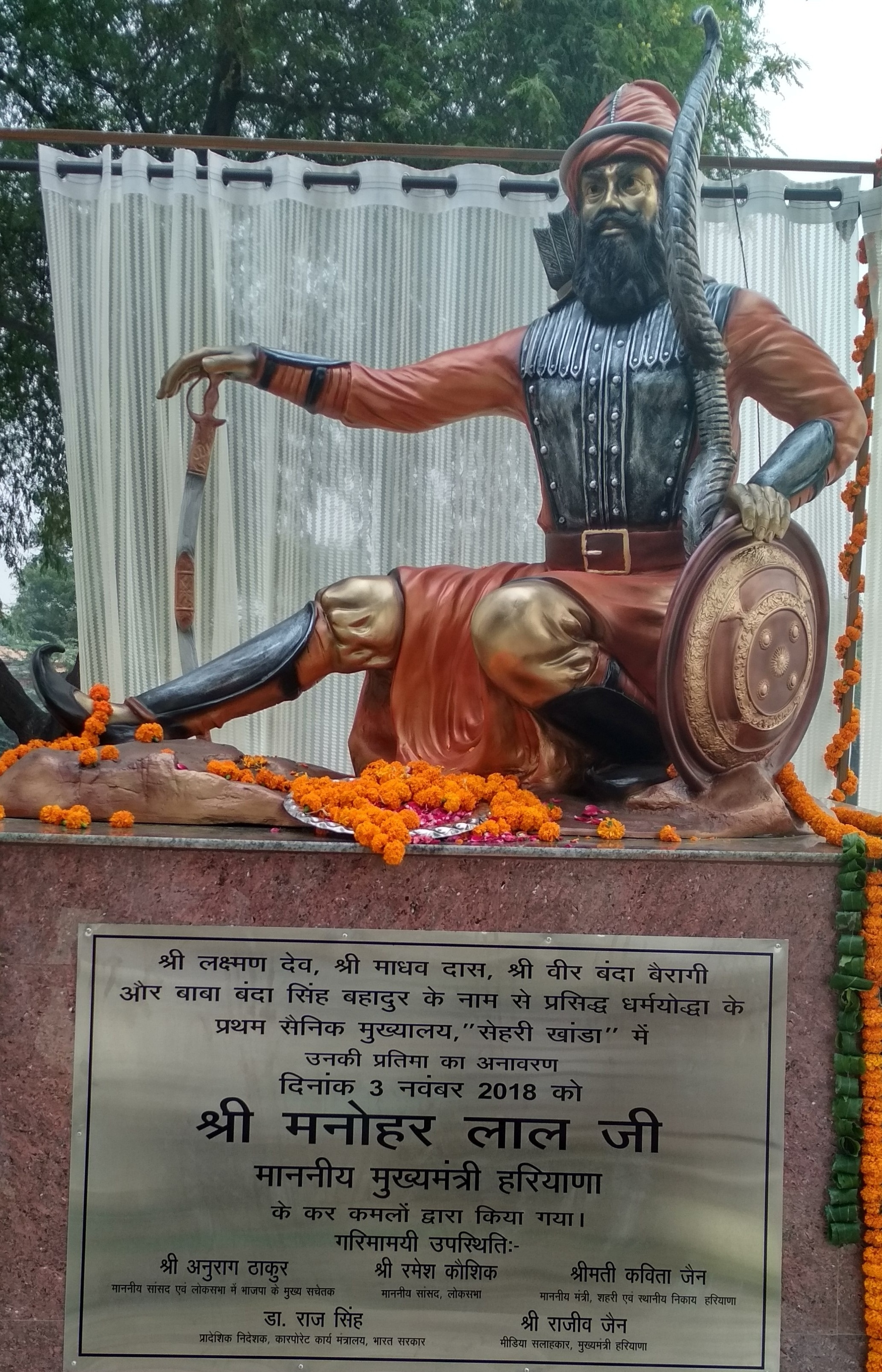
- Baba Banda Singh Bahadur War Memorial in Khanda, Sonipat
Date	1709
Location	Sonipat, Delhi Subah, Mughal Empire (Present day India)
Result	Sikh victory

Belligerents
Khalsa (Sikhs) Dahiya Jat Chaudharies of Kharkhoda	Mughal Empire

Commanders and leaders
Banda Singh Bahadur; Baj Singh; Binod Singh	Kiladar of Sonipat

Strength
500	Unknown

The Battle of Sonipat was fought between Sikhs and the Mughal Empire in 1709. It was the first significant battle during Banda Singh Bahadur's rebellion.

== Prelude ==
In 1708, Banda Singh Bahadur became the Jathedar of the Khalsa Army and he was sent to Punjab by Guru Gobind Singh to fight against the Mughal Empire.

== Battle ==
Khanda, Sonipat village (Sehri Khanda) witnessed the Battle of Sonipat against the Mughals and won the battle under the military leadership of Banda Singh Bahadur. He first camped at Khanda village, with an army of 500, and then marched to Sonipat, attacked the town, and threw an open challenge to the Mughal Empire. The Mughal Faujdar of Sonipat was utterly unprepared and he was routed in the battle and was defeated.

=== Pillage of Sonipat ===
The Sikhs then plundered the Provincial Mughal Treasury and villages at Sonipat.

== Aftermath ==
After the Sonipat conquest, Banda Singh Bahadur reached Samana, Punjab and attacked the town. The Sikhs won the battle against the Mughals in Samana.
