= Rajvir Dahiya =

Indian-American academic scientist

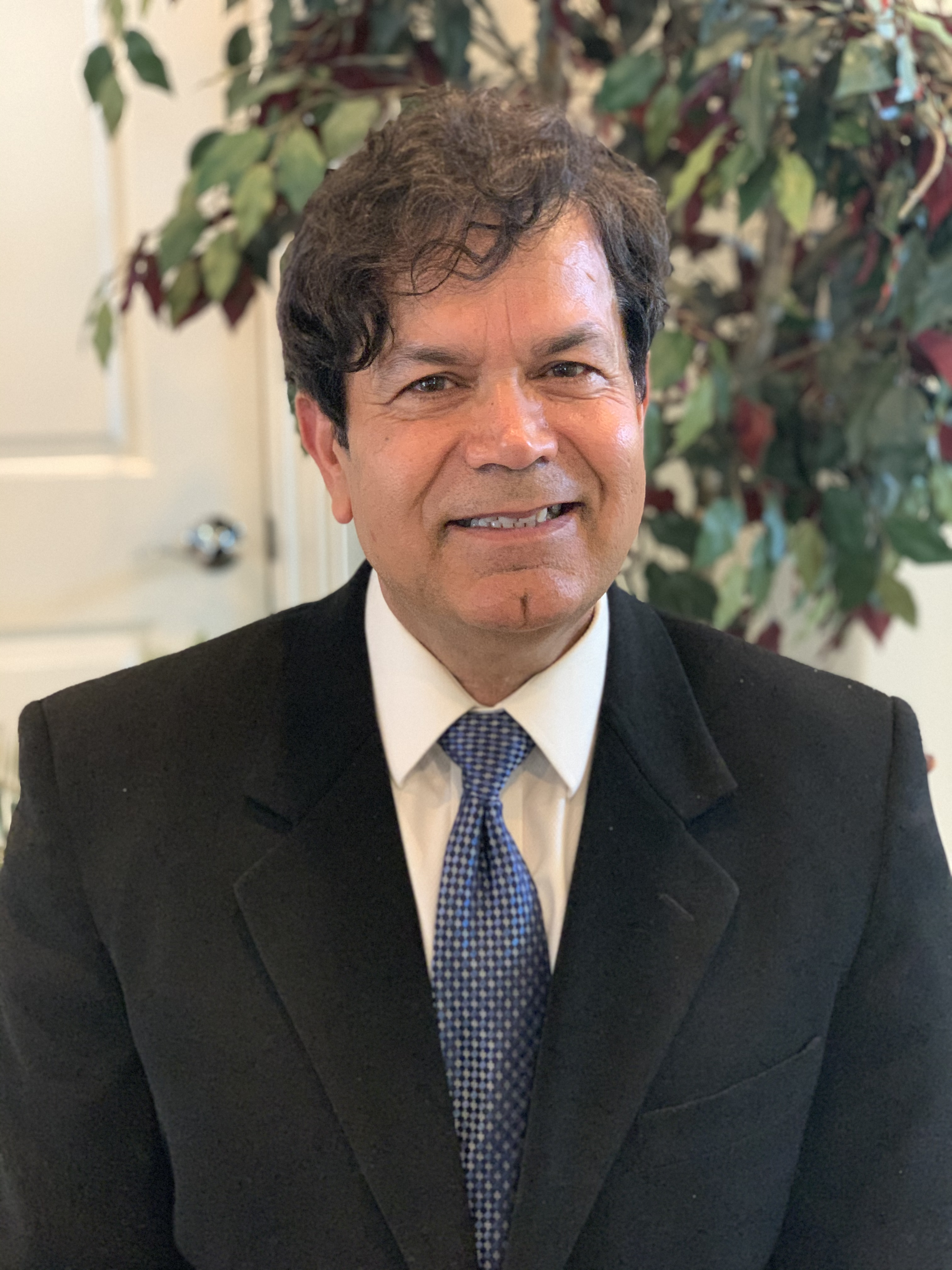
- Medical career
- Profession: Scientist
- Institutions: University of California, San Francisco (UCSF)
- Research: Oncology

Rajvir Dahiya (born May 30, 1956) is an American Indian medical oncology scientist with expertise in urology oncology diagnosis, prognosis and risk assessment through genetic and epigenetic technology. Dahiya retired in 2021 as a Professor Emeritus and Director of Urology Oncology Research Center at the Veterans Affairs Medical Center and the University of California San Francisco School of Medicine (UCSF) after 34 years of service.

After retirement, Dahiya founded Geneverify Inc. in 2021, a company registered in California, USA. The company is dedicated to research and development in precision oncology, particularly in the creation of in vitro diagnostic tests for cancer screening, early diagnosis, prognosis, and treatment follow-up. Geneverify is also working on developing novel medical technologies that target oncogenes, aiming to provide the most effective and highly specific treatments for various cancers, potentially saving the lives of millions of cancer patients.

== Early life and family ==
Dahiya was born in Bidhlan, Sonipat, Haryana, India. His parents were farmers. He finished his PhD in 1983 in the field of Experimental Medicine from Post Graduate Institute of Medical Education and Research Chandigarh, India. After completing his PhD, Dahiya joined the University of Chicago Pritzker School of Medicine and did his post doctoral fellowship in medical oncology and molecular biology. After completing his fellowship, Dahiya joined UCSF School of Medicine and San Francisco Veterans Affairs Medical Center (VAMC) in 1987. Dahiya received his M.D. from the Kagoshima University Faculty of Medicine, Kagoshima, Japan and D.Sc. from the Osaka University Graduate School of Medicine, Osaka, Japan. He became director of Oncology Urology Oncology Research Center at the UCSF/VAMC in 1991. After 34 years of service at the UCSF, he retired as a Professor Emeritus and Director of Urology Research Center. Also retired as a Senior Research Career Scientist from the Department of Veterans Affairs, Washington DC.

== Positions and publications ==
Dahiya was a scientific reviewer and chairman (1996-2021) for the medical research programs in prostate, ovarian and breast cancer at the United States Army Department of Defense’s (DOD). He was also a member and chairman (1992-2021) of various scientific committees for National Institutes of Health (NIH), including the National Cancer Institute (NCI) and the National Institute of Diabetes and Digestive and Kidney Diseases (NIDDK). Dahiya is a medical research advisor and scientific reviewer for several international programs and institutions.

Dahiya has published more than 550 original research manuscripts. Dahiya’s world ranking in medicine is 4759 and USA ranking is 2644 with more than 35,500 research citations and D-index of 107 in 2024. He has written books and holds multiple patents in oncology. Based on the NIH and VA data base NIH Reporter and Grantome, Dahiya's research programs were supported (99 times awarded) by the NIH and VA. Dahiya was a scientific adviser to the president of India Dr. A.P.J. Abul Kalam (Avul Pakir Jainulabdeen Abdul Kalam, 11th President of India from 2002-2007).

Dr. Rajvir Dahiya and Dr. Dharampal Singh Chauhan are discussing with the President of India about the transfer of medical technologies from the USA to India in the field of cancer diagnosis, prognosis and treatment that would save the lives of millions of cancer patients. Dahiya is an associate editor of Cancer Research, is an associate editor of Clinical Cancer Research, an academic editor of “PLoS ONE, and a senior academic editor of American Journal of Cancer Research.

Dahiya (president) and Chauhan (secretary) of "Society of American Asian Scientists in Cancer Research" are leading this society that has more than 5,000 cancer scientists in the USA.

== Keynote speaker and scientific contributions ==
Dahiya has been internationally recognized as a keynote speaker, organizing committee member, and scientific advisor for global cancer conferences. His participation underscores his contributions to cancer epigenetics, molecular oncology, and RNA therapeutics.

Selected Conferences:

- 9th Edition of the International Cancer Conference (October 8–20, 2026, Tokyo, Japan)
- 2nd Edition of the International Cancer & Immuno-Oncology Conference (March 19–21, 2026, Singapore)
- International Conference on Cancer Science and Research (November 17–19, 2025, Singapore)
- 8th Edition of the International Cancer Conference (September 18–20, 2025, London, UK)
- I nternational Cancer Research Conference (March 24–26, 2025, Singapore)
- 8th World Cancer Congress (March 21–23, 2024, New Delhi, India)

== Landmark Discoveries in Molecular Oncology and Cancer Biology ==
Dahiya’s pioneering research has significantly advanced the understanding of the fundamental molecular mechanisms that drive tumor initiation, progression, and metastasis. His discoveries have profoundly influenced current knowledge of microsatellite instability, gene methylation, and epigenetic regulation in prostate and other cancers. His groundbreaking work has led to landmark publications, influential patents, and transformative paradigms in cancer biology that continue to shape the field of modern precision oncology.

- 1986 – Early Biomarkers of Colon Cancer: Discovered premalignant alterations in lipid composition and phospholipid methylation in a colon cancer model, demonstrating that changes in glycosphingolipids may serve as early molecular biomarkers for colon cancer detection. PubMed: 3949981 | 3802088 | 3801474 | 3412124
- ·1989 – Role of Blood Group Antigens in Tumor Progression: Discovered that ABH antigen expression, synthesis, and degradation are critically involved in colon cancer progression, providing novel insights into glycosylation pathways and tumor biology. PubMed: 2545345
- 1991 – Mucin Gene Expression and Metastasis: Discovered that mucin gene expression correlates with the metastatic potential of human colon cancer cells, influencing their ability to colonize the liver in experimental models and establishing a mechanistic link between mucin regulation and metastatic behavior. PubMed: 1999484 | 2064602 | 1728605 | 7678777 | 1511431 | 1515998
- Discovery of Metastasis-Related Glycoproteins: Identified that cell-surface sialoproteins and glycoproteins play a critical role in determining metastatic behavior in colon cancer, laying the groundwork for future studies in cancer glycomics and molecular targeting. PubMed: 2297775
- 1997 – Microsatellite Instability in Prostate Cancer: Dahiya’s group was among the first to demonstrate that microsatellite instability (MSI) plays a crucial role in the pathophysiology of prostate cancer, identifying genomic instability as a driving force in tumorigenesis and progression. PubMed: 9311591 | 10811996 | 10024682 | 10521795
- 2000 – Gene Methylation in Prostate Cancer Initiation and Progression: Dahiya made landmark discoveries showing that frequent promoter methylation of multiple tumor suppressor genes contributes to both initiation and progression of prostate cancer. These studies established the epigenetic silencing of key regulatory genes as a hallmark of prostate tumorigenesis and paved the way for methylation-based diagnostic and prognostic assays. PubMed: 10676656 | 11880477 | 15895377 | 11870882 | 15342374 | 15363862 | 17473182 | 16885337 | 15657340

== DNA Methylation and microRNA Innovations for Precision Oncology and Cancer Health Equity ==
Dahiya’s laboratory pioneered several foundational discoveries and technological innovations that revolutionized the study of DNA methylation, gene regulation, and epigenetic biomarkers in the field of cancer etiology and diagnosis. His group not only advanced the cutting-edge molecular methodologies but also discovered key genetic and population-based determinants that influence tumor biology, contributing critical insights to the field of cancer epigenetics.

- Dahiya’s team developed the first computational program for designing PCR primers optimized for methylation analysis, enabling accurate bisulfite-based PCR methods such as BSP and MSP. This innovation became a widely adopted tool for researchers worldwide in the field of DNA methylation. PubMed: 12424112
- Dahiya’s group invented a bisulfite conversion–specific and methylation-specific PCR method for quantitative CpG methylation evaluation, significantly improving assay accuracy and reproducibility in epigenetic studies. PubMed: 12951050
- They pioneered multigene methylation analysis for prostate cancer detection and staging, establishing a molecular basis for distinguishing indolent from aggressive disease. PubMed: 16166436
- Dahiya’s group was among the first to demonstrate DNA methylation differences as a key factor underlying the higher incidence and aggressiveness of prostate cancer in African American men, and demonstrated the role of miRNAs in race-related prostate cancer health disparities. These studies are highly cited and influential in molecular oncology and health equity research. PubMed: 15800905 | 30874288 | 34525952 | 31266828 | 28157714
- They discovered that gene hypermethylation serves as a novel epigenetic biomarker for the diagnosis and prognosis of bladder and kidney cancers, establishing the clinical utility of methylation-based diagnostics. PubMed: 16609023 | 17145819

== Breakthrough Discoveries in RNA Activation and Blood-Based mRNA Genomic Technologies for Precision Diagnostics and RNA Therapeutics ==
Dahiya’s laboratory made a critical discovery that reshaped molecular biology through the identification of RNA activation (RNAa), a previously unrecognized mechanism in which small RNAs induce gene upregulation. Building on decades of molecular and epigenetic research, Dahiya translated these fundamental discoveries into transformative diagnostic and therapeutic technologies. His innovations have led to multiple U.S. patents that now underpin emerging RNA-based therapies and next-generation genomic medicine.

Dahiya’s team discovered that promoter-targeted double-stranded RNAs (dsRNAs) can activate gene transcription through an Argonaute-dependent pathway, directly opposing the classical RNA interference (RNAi) mechanism of gene silencing.

- They coined the terms “RNA activation (RNAa)” and “small activating RNA (saRNA)”, establishing a new paradigm in gene regulation and function.
- They further discovered that endogenous microRNAs (miRNAs) can also induce gene expression, documenting a natural mechanism of miRNA-mediated RNAa.
- This groundbreaking work opened a new era in gene activation therapeutics, providing a foundation for RNA-based drug development, epigenetic reprogramming, and precision gene modulation and function.

These discoveries are widely cited and continue to influence research in RNA therapeutics, epigenetic editing, and gene activation and function. PubMed: 17082428 | 18347154 | 19384944 | 18227514 | PMC1859931 | ScienceSpace Article | Wikipedia: RNA Activation

== Retractions ==
In 2022 it was reported that a joint investigation by the University of California San Francisco and the San Francisco Veterans Affairs Medical Center revealed examples of fabrication or falsification in some of Dahiya's published work. As of 2022 Dahiya has had four of his research publications retracted, one paper has received an expression of concern, and one paper has been corrected. It appears that this issue may have resulted from a UCSF data preservation policy.
