= Sonipat Municipal Corporation =

Municipal Corporation in Haryana, India

Type
- Type: Municipal Corporation
- Term limits: 5 years

History
- Founded: 1993; 33 years ago

Leadership
- Mayor: Rajeev Jain, BJP since May 2026
- Municipal Commissioner: Harshit Kumar, IAS

Structure
- Political groups: Government (17): BJP (17); Opposition (5): INC (5)
- Length of term: 5 years

Elections
- Voting system: First-past-the-post
- Last election: 2026
- Next election: 2031

Meeting place
- Sonipat, Haryana

Sonipat Municipal Corporation or Municipal Corporation of Sonipat is the governing civic body of the Urban Area city Sonipat in Sonipat district, Haryana, India. The Municipal Committee Sonipat was established in 1933. Municipal Corporation mechanism in India was introduced during British Rule with formation of municipal corporation in Madras (Chennai) in 1688, later followed by municipal corporations in Bombay (Mumbai) and Calcutta (Kolkata) by 1762. Sonipat Municipal Corporation has been formed with functions to improve the infrastructure of town.

== History and administration ==
Sonipat Municipal Corporation was formed to improve the infrastructure of the town as per the needs of local population. Sonipat Municipal Corporation has been categorised into wards and each ward is headed by councillor for which elections are held every 5 years.

Sonipat Municipal Corporation is governed by mayor and administered by Municipal Commissioner.

== Departments ==
List of departments in Municipal Corporation Sonipat:

Public Health Department	Planning & Building Branch
Health & Sanitation Department	Horticulture Department
Building & Roads Department	Fire and Emergency Services Department
Electrical Department	Finance & Accounts Department
Legal Department	Pensions & P.F.Department
Audit Department	Urban Poverty Alleviation & Livelihood Cell
Architecture Department	Estate Department
Booking Department	Public Relations Department
Enforcement Department	I.T. Department
Agenda Department	Taxation Department
Paid Parking Department	

== Geography ==
Sonipat is located at 28.98°N 77.02°E. in Sonipat in the state of Haryana, India.

== Revenue sources ==
The following are the Income sources for the corporation from the Central and State Government.

=== Revenue from taxes ===
Following is the Tax related revenue for the corporation.

- Property tax.
- Profession tax.
- Entertainment tax.
- Grants from Central and State Government like Goods and Services Tax.
- Advertisement tax.

=== Revenue from non-tax sources ===
Following is the Non Tax related revenue for the corporation.

- Water usage charges.
- Fees from Documentation services.
- Rent received from municipal property.
- Funds from municipal bonds.
