= Khanda, Sonipat =

Khanda
- Village
- Location in Haryana, India Khanda (India)
- Coordinates: 28°55′10″N 76°53′53″E
- Country: India
- State: Haryana
- District: Sonipat
- Tehsil: Kharkhoda
- Founder: Pandava
- Named for: Khandava Forest

Government
  - Body: Gram Panchayat

Area
  - Total: 20.59 km^{2} (7.95 sq mi)

Population (2011)
  - Total: 12,000

Languages
  - Regional: Haryanvi
  - Official: Hindi, English
- Time zone: IST (UTC+5:30)
- PIN: 131402
- Phone: 0130
- Vehicle registration: HR 79
- Ethnic groups: Dahiya Jats
- Literacy: 91.07%
- Website: http://sonipat.nic.in/

Khanda is a big and historical village in Kharkhoda tehsil of Sonipat district in Haryana, India. It is located 2 miles (3.2 km) from Kharkhoda and 7 miles (11 km) from Sonipat. It is a part of the Delhi NCR. Khanda has two Gram Panchayats Khanda Khas and Khanda Alman. Two Sarpanchs elects from the village in every five years. Khanda is the head of 12 villages of Dahiya Khap mainly known as (Khanda Baraha).

== History ==
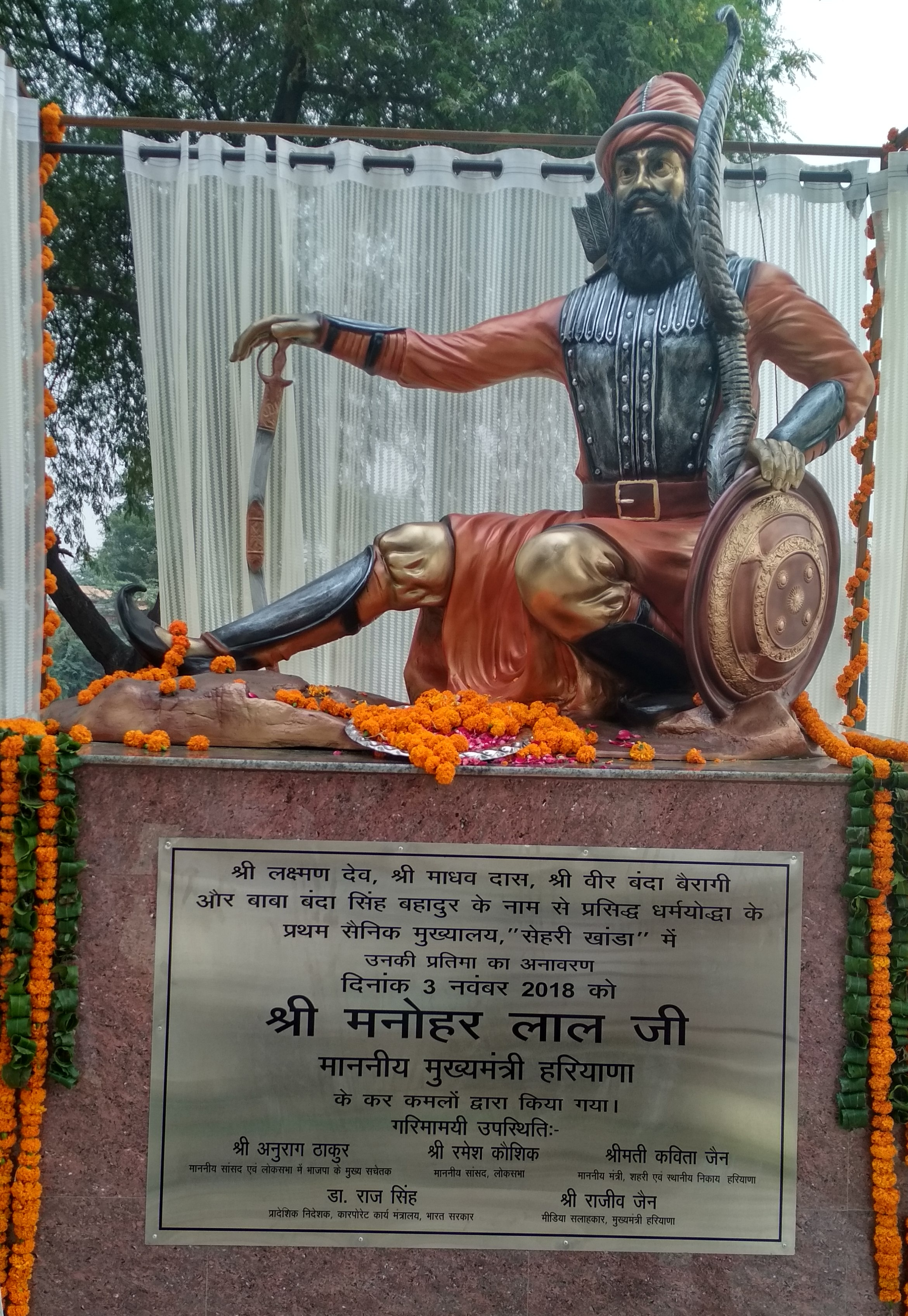
Banda Singh Bahadur Memorial in Khanda

In 1709, Banda Singh Bahadur came here and raised his army and set up his first army headquarters with the help of villagers from Khanda, Sonipat to attack Mughal treasury and to free Punjab from tyranny of Mughals after getting blessings of Guru Gobind Singh. He defeated Mughals in the Battle of Sonipat and conquered it. Thereafter, he would go on to kill Mughal Governor (equivalent to chief minister) of Punjab, the richest and most powerful province of the Mughal Empire, inflicting biggest defeats to the Mughals. Khanda witnessed the Battle of Sonipat against Mughals and won the battle under the military leadership of Banda Singh Bahadur Khanda is most powerful village. Many history books says that Khanda was named after the Mahabharata times Khandava Forest or Khandavaprastha. One of the oldest Nirmohi Akhara math is located at Khanda village Dada Kishor Das was the first Mahant of this math. The two princely states of Chhattisgarh Rajnandgaon and Chhuikhadan were established by two followers of Baba Banda Singh Bahadur. His two followers were Chaudhary Rup Singh Dahiya and Chaudhary Prahlad Singh Dahiya came from Khanda, Sonipat village who belonged to famous Nirmohi Akhara of Khanda.

== Battle of Sonipat ==
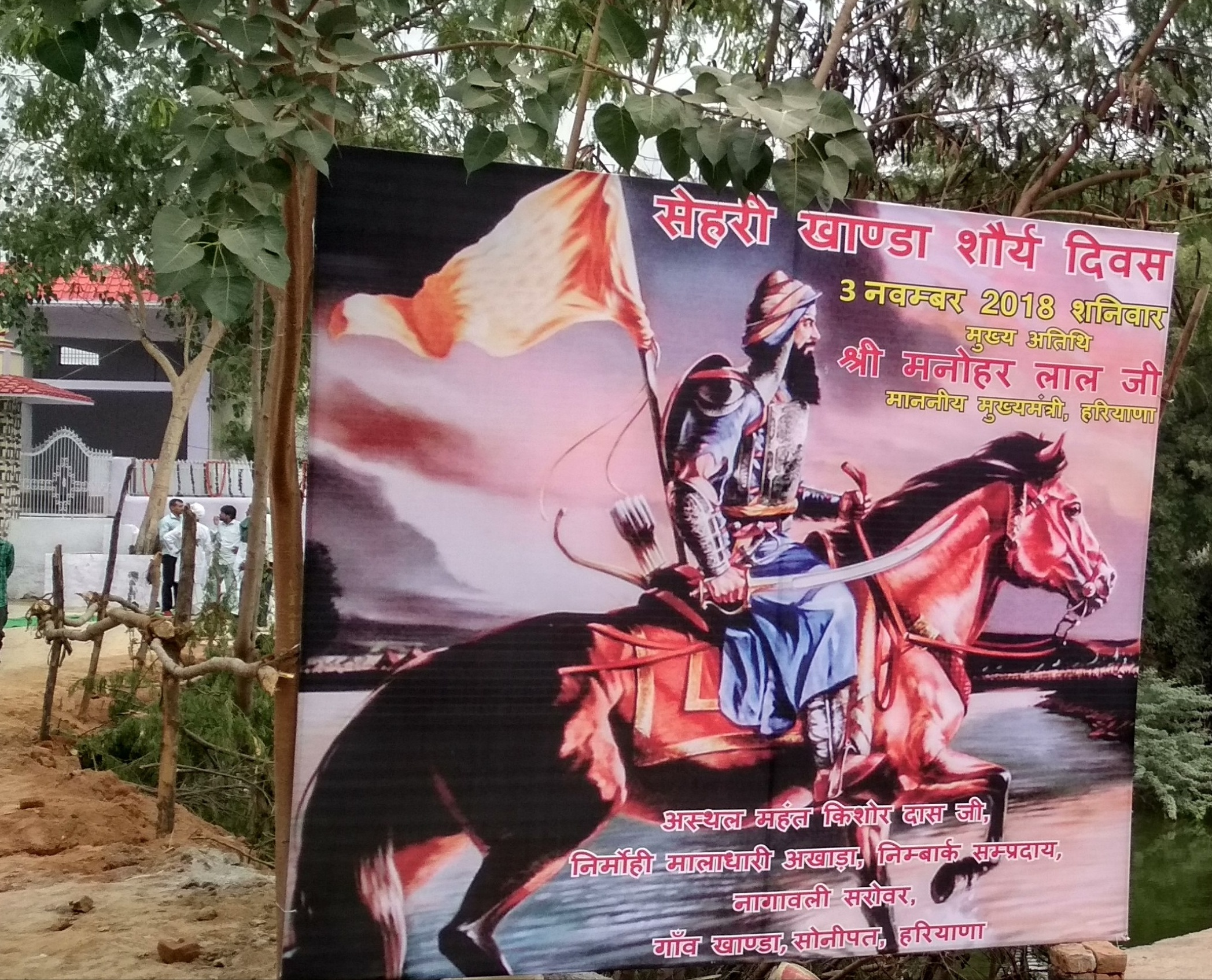
Celebrating Shaurya Diwas in Khanda

The one and only battle fought in Sonipat was Battle of Sonipat. After taking blessings from Guru Gobind Singh, Baba Banda Singh Bahadur first camped at Sehri Khanda, Sonipat and assembled a fighting force with Dahiya Jats. Khanda village witnessed the Battle of Sonipat against Mughals and won the battle under the military leadership of Banda Singh Bahadur.

== Ram Mandir ==
Nirmohi Akhara who struggled for 200 years for Ayodhya's Ram temple and was one of the main plaintiffs in the Ayodhya dispute of Ram Janmabhoomi-Babri Masjid title suits, has built a grand temple of 'Ram Lalla' in Khanda village of Sonipat district in Haryana.

== Infrastructure ==
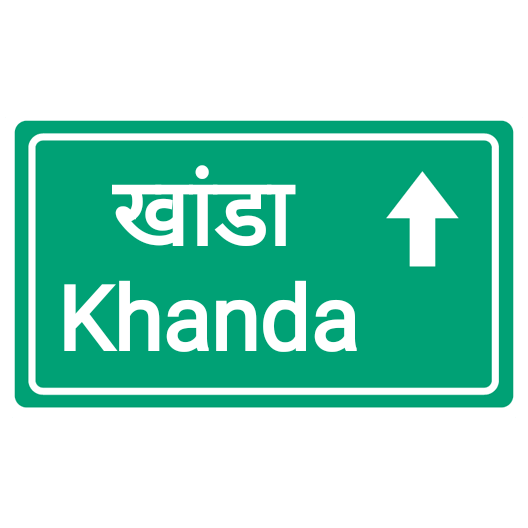
Highway Sign Board

There are two Government Schools and four Private schools and one college in the village. Government of Haryana acquired 50 acres land in Khanda for Haryana's first Armed Forces Preparatory Institute. Nasirpur Cholka is said to be the capital of Khanda. On 3 November 2018, Chief Minister Manohar Lal Khattar inaugurated the Armed Forces Preparatory Institute and Banda Singh Bahadur memorial. This institute will provide training to selected boys from the state for commission in armed forces through National Defence Academy (India), Indian Military Academy and Officers Training Academy. CM also announce to open a Govt. Clinic it will also benefit to nearby villages.

Khanda village is 8 km far away from Maruti Suzuki manufacturing plant across 900 acre in IMT Kharkhoda. Property prices hike in Khanda village due to the proximity with Maruti Suzuki's new manufacturing facility in Kharkhoda.

== Connectivity ==
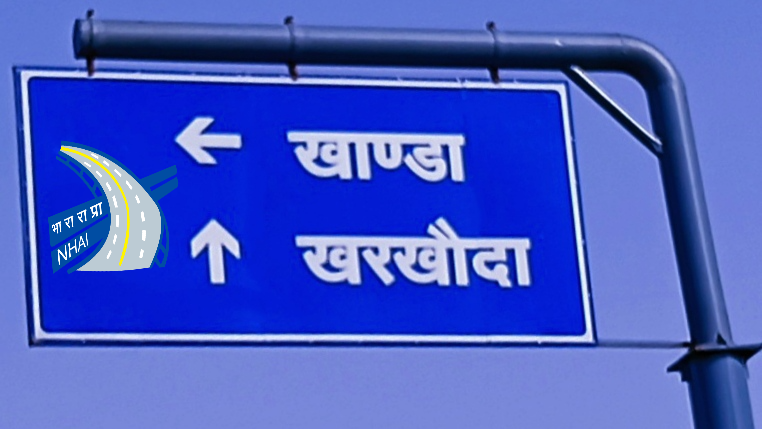
Village Sign Board

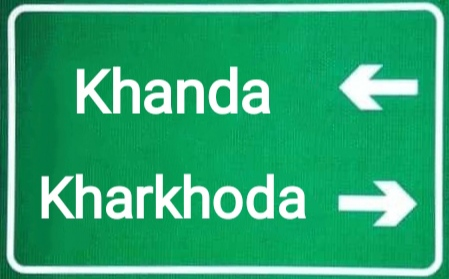
Khanda Kharkhoda

The village lies on Major District Road that connects many villages. It is 4 km away from National Highway 334B (India) and State Highway 18. It is 8 km away from National Highway 344P (India) and Western Peripheral Expressway (KMP) and it is 9 km away from Delhi–Amritsar–Katra Expressway and 22 km away from National Highway 44 (India) AH1 & AH2 also known as GT Road Grand Trunk Road.

The nearby airport is Indira Gandhi International Airport and nearby railway station is Sonipat Junction railway station. Nearby holy river is Yamuna and nearby major canal is Western Yamuna Canal. NCR water channel and the Reliance canal flows from the village.

== Notable people ==
- Vinod Kumar Dahiya Wrestler
- Rohit Dahiya Cricketer
- Padam Singh Dahiya Leader
- Vivek Dahiya Actor
- Deep Chand Bahman Saang Artist

== See also ==
- Kharkhoda, Haryana
- Sonipat
- Battle of Sonipat
- Khandava Forest
- Banda Singh Bahadur
- Bharata Khanda
- Khandavaprastha
- Swarnprastha
- Sehri, Sonipat
