= Ivan Popov (wrestler) =

Russian-Australian wrestler

Personal information
- Born: 25 May 1986 (age 40) Omsk, Soviet Union
- Height: 203 cm (6 ft 8 in)
- Weight: 106 kg (234 lb)
Medal record
Men's Greco-Roman wrestling
Representing Australia
Commonwealth Games
Gold medal – first place	2010 Delhi	120 kg

Ivan Popov (born 25 May 1986) is an Australian Greco-Roman wrestler of Russian descent.

In 2010, he won a gold medal at the 2010 Commonwealth Games in the Men's Greco-Roman 120 kg division, Australia's first win in 32 years.

He attempted to qualify to wrestle for the 2012 Olympics.

In 2016, he finished 2nd at the 2016 African & Oceania Wrestling Olympic Qualification Tournament to earn an Olympic berth.

He is the son of Olympic bronze medalist and world champion Vladimir Popov.
