= Kushal Singh Dahiya =

Sikh martyr

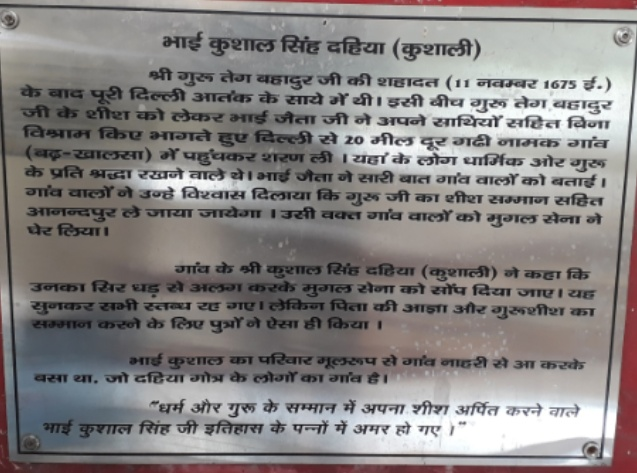
Bhai Kushal Singh Dahiya

Kushal Singh Dahiya or Bhai Kushal Singh Dahiya was a Jat from the village of Badhkhalsa in what is now Sonipat, Haryana, India. He offered his head in place of that of the Sikh Guru Tegh Bahadur, which was being taken to Anandpur Sahib by Bhai Jiwan Singh and which Mughals wanted to seize. Dahiya was thus killed for that purpose.

There is a memorial for Kushal Singh Dahiya at Badhkhalsa Memorial Complex, Rai, in Sonipat.

== See also ==
Sikh sites in Haryana

- Khanda, Sonipat
- Brahma Sarovar
- Kapal Mochan
- Lohgarh, capital of Banda Singh Bahadur
- Pehowa
- Sadaura
