= Preeti Dahiya =

Indian boxer (born 2004)

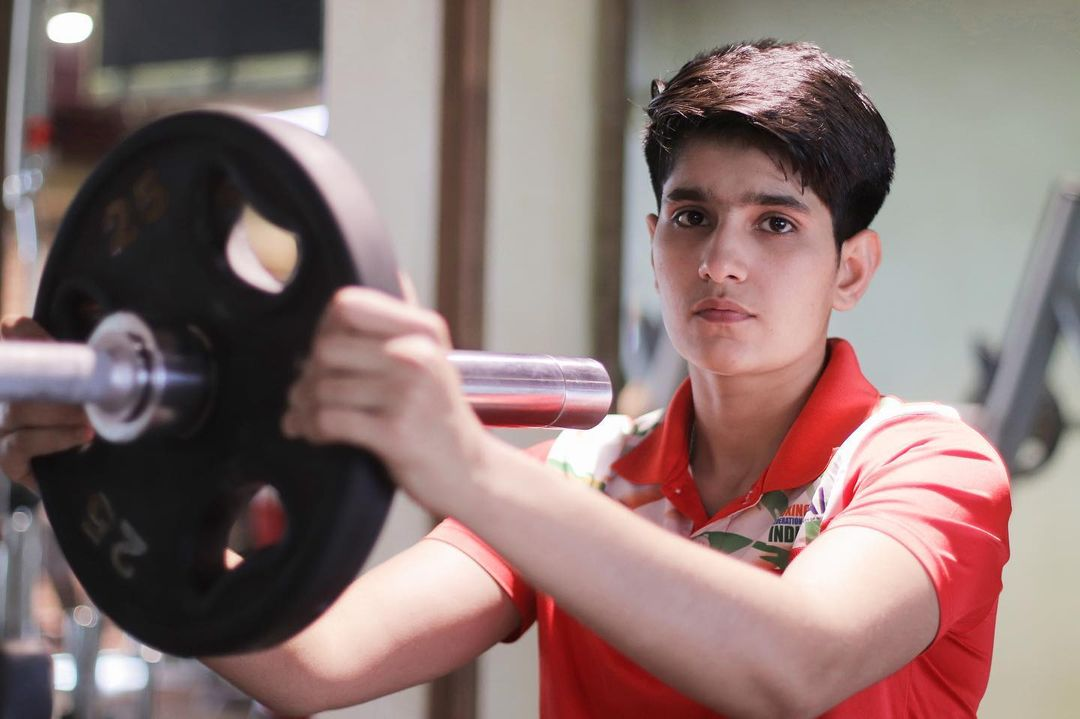
- Preeti Dahiya

Personal information
- Nationality: Indian
- Born: 16 June 2004 (age 22) Silana, Sonipat, Haryana, India

Sport
- Sport: Boxing
- Weight class: lightweight (60 kg)
Medal record
Women's amateur boxing
Representing India
Asian Championships
Bronze medal – third place	2022 Amman	Featherweight

Preeti Dahiya is an Indian amateur boxer. She was a Gold medallist at the 2019 Asian Junior Boxing Championship.

== Early life ==
Preeti Dahiya was born on 16 June 2004 in Delhi in Fateh Nagar, Delhi, India, but she and her family belong to Silana Village of Haryana state's sonipat district. Her father, Harinder Dahiya is a farmer, and her mother, Poonam is a housewife.

== Career ==
She started boxing in 2016 after taking inspiration from Indian kabaddi team captain Deepak Niwas Hooda. After six months of training under the coach Mahendra Singh Dhaka, she won silver medal at the school-level national championships in the same year. She continued her training and in 2019 she won gold medal in the Asian Junior Boxing Championship. She won the lightweight division (60 kg) of the 2021 ASBC Asian Youth Boxing Championships after defeating Kazakhstan's Zuldyz Shayakmetova 3–2.
