= Vikas Dahiya =

Indian field hockey player

Personal information
- Full name: Vikas Dahiya
- Born: 8 May 1995 (age 31) Sonipat, Haryana, India

Sport
- Sport: Field hockey
- Position: Goalkeeper
Medal record
Men's field hockey
Representing India
Champions Trophy
Silver medal – second place	2016 London	Team
South Asian Games
Silver medal – second place	2016 Guwahati	Team
Junior World Cup
Gold medal – first place	2016 Lucknow
Junior Asia Cup
Gold medal – first place	2015 Kuantan

Vikas Dahiya (born 8 May 1995) is an Indian field hockey player and plays as a goalkeeper in the Indian national team

== Achievements ==
- Vikas Dahiya has 24 international caps.
- He was awarded the best goalkeeper of the tournament at Junior Asia Cup, 2015.
- He saved 2 goals in the penalty shootout against Australia at the semi-final stage in Junior Hockey World Cup 2016 to help India reach the finals. He was awarded Man of the Match for his brilliant performance.

=== International ===
- Vikas was a part of the Indian hockey squad for Rio Olympics, 2016.
- Silver at the 2016 SAF Games in Guwahati.
- Silver at Champions Trophy London, 2016.
- Gold at Junior Asia Cup 2015.
- Gold at Junior Hockey World Cup 2016.
