= Khap =

System of social administration

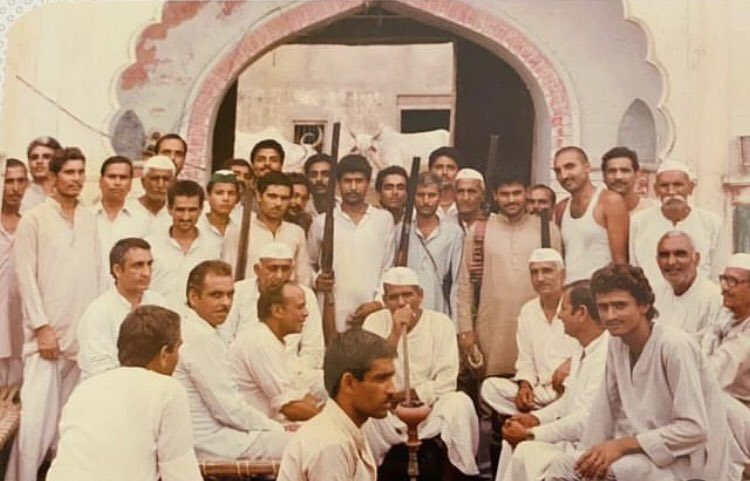
Former Baliyan Khap Chaudhary-Mahendra Singh Tikait (in Centre)

A Khap is a traditional community organization representing a clan or group of villages. They are mainly associated with Indian communities such as the Jats, Modern khaps are mainly found in the states of Haryana and Western Uttar Pradesh, and are especially common in these Jat-dominated villages. Khaps also exist in Rajasthan and Madhya Pradesh.

A Khap Panchayat is an assembly of Khap elders, while a Sarv Khap is an assembly of many Khap Panchayats. These bodies are not part of the formal government system and hold no official authority. However, they often exert significant social influence and handle affairs within the community they represent.

Notable khaps include the Baliyan Khap, led by the famous farmer's rights activist Mahendra Singh Tikait until 2011, the Dahiya Khap in Haryana, and the Gathwala Khap who were zamindars since Mughal era and took title of Malik.

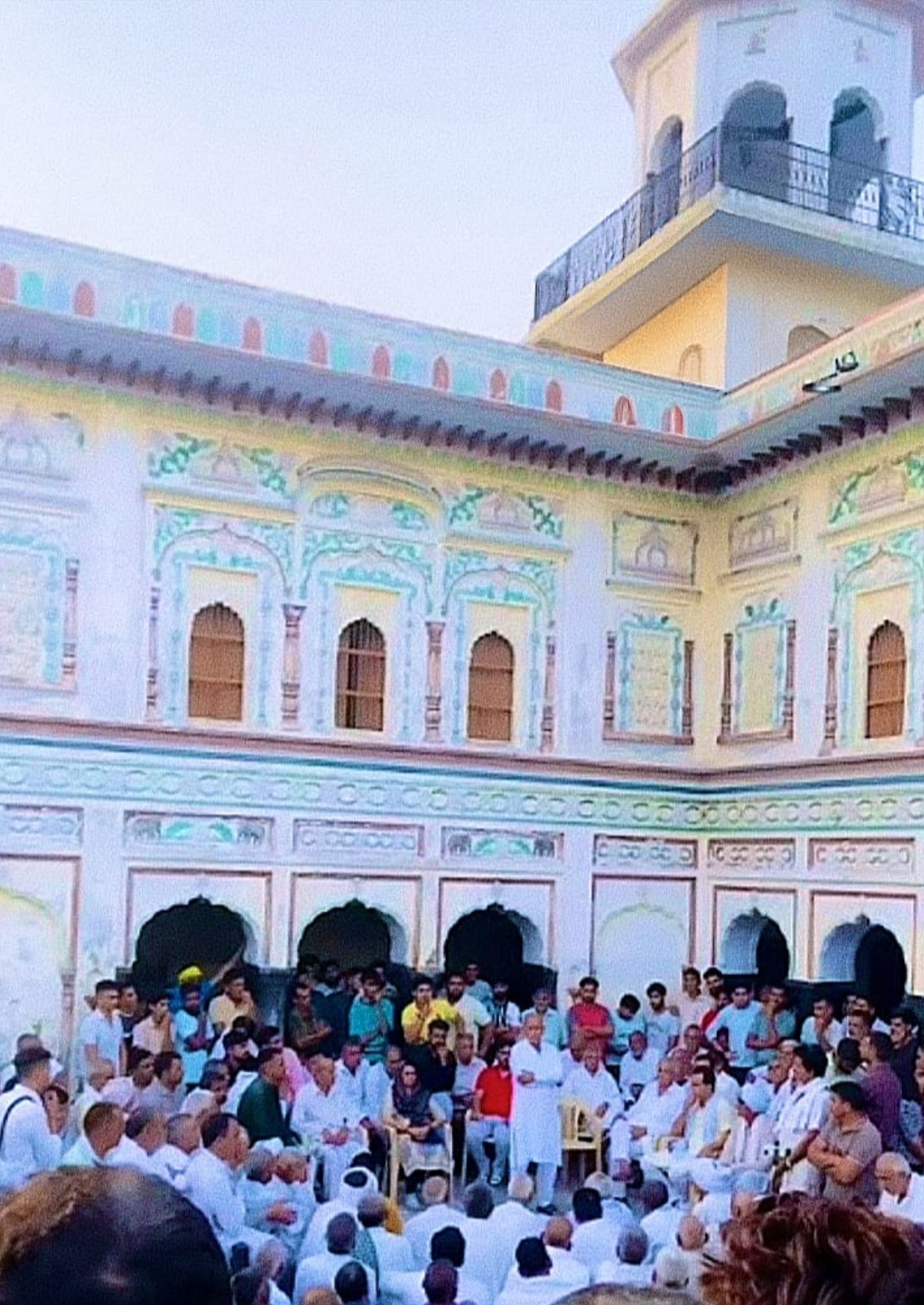
A Jat Khap Panchayat meeting in a village.

== History ==
The Khaps evolved as tribal and village administrations. One of the terms used to denote the republic was the Khap. Others were Pal, Janapada, and Gaṇasaṅgha.

Khaps have been dated back to the 14th or 15th century, as part of the social structure of the Hindu people, who lived in the region that is now north eastern Rajasthan, eastern Haryana, and Western Uttar Pradesh.

There are historical documentational evidences that reveal the organization of Meerut division's khaps into the sarvkhap panchayat as far back as the 13th century. Haryana Sarwakhap Panchayat was established in 664 A.D. There is also a native belief that claims that King Harshavardhan systematized the sarv–khap panchayat in the 7th century at Prayag (modern Prayagraj) during his quinquennial assemblage.

These Khaps enabled clans to organize and expand their influence. The Baliyan Khap established its headquarters in Sisuali village in the 12th century, from where the clan launched campaigns of "territorial expansion, conquest and colonization" until the first decades of the 16th century. By the late 16th century, various clan members ruled the 84 villages of Pargana Sisuali. During the reign of Mughal emperor Akbar, certain Khaps (including the Baliyan Khap) would be granted internal autonomy in exchange for their support of the new revenue system.

"...Akbar made several concessions to the local clans of the upper Doab region... The [Khap] councils were to carry on as before without interference. Imposts that the Jats had resisted for centuries were to be waived. In return, however, the clan councils accepted the new revenue system... They asked for local agency in collection, but did not quarrel with its implementation. In this region at least, imperiwal policy relied both upon force and conciliation."

During British colonial rule, influential Khap members were chosen as officials for their local areas.

== Structure ==
The Khap consisted of a unit of 84 villages. The individual villages were governed by an elected council, known as the panchayat. A unit of seven villages was called a Thamba and 12 Thambas formed the Khap unit of 84 villages, though Khaps of 12 and 24 villages existed. Their elected leaders would determine which units would be represented at the Khap level. The Sarv Khap (or All Khap) Panchayat (Council) represented all the Khaps. The individual Khaps would elect leaders who would send delegates to represent their Khaps at the Sarv Khap. It was a political organisation, composed of all the clans, communities, and castes in the region.

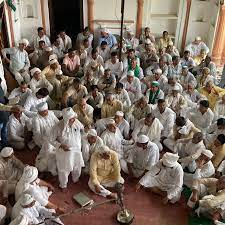
A Khap Panchayat holding a meeting in West UP

Members of khap panchayats are all male, though they often make decisions affecting women. In Haryana, women are not allowed to be present at a panchayat and are represented by their male relatives. Members of Sarva Jaateeya Venain Khap, one of the largest khap panchayats in Haryana, have instead said there are no female khap members because they feel uncomfortable attending, not because they are not allowed.

== Decisions on social issues ==
The Khap Panchayats frequently make pronouncements on social issues, such as abortion, alcohol abuse, dowry, and to promote education, specially among girls. In October 2012, one Khap Panchayat leader in Haryana suggested that the age of marriage should be dropped from 18 to 16.

Khaps have attracted attention in recent times for their decisions on marriage. Khaps have opposed marriages between members of different castes, of certain gotras from which intermarriage is prohibited, and of the same village. In July 2000, a panchayat nullified the marriage of Ashish and Darshana, two years after they had married and produced a son, on the basis that they were from two gotras (clans) prohibited to marry, and should have a brother-sister relationship. Punishments handed down by khap panchayats in marriage cases include fines, social ostracism, public humiliation, and expulsion from the village.

Khap Panchayats are a "useful instrument" of society and carry out social reforms and "one or two mistakes don't make them wrong as a whole," said Haryana Chief Minister Manohar Lal Khattar in an interview.

Naresh Tikait, head of Baliyan Khap, criticized love marriages, saying "Marriage is a union of two consenting families and not just two individuals. So all stakeholders should have a say in that. If parents take all the pains to educate their girls then they also have right over their marriages too."

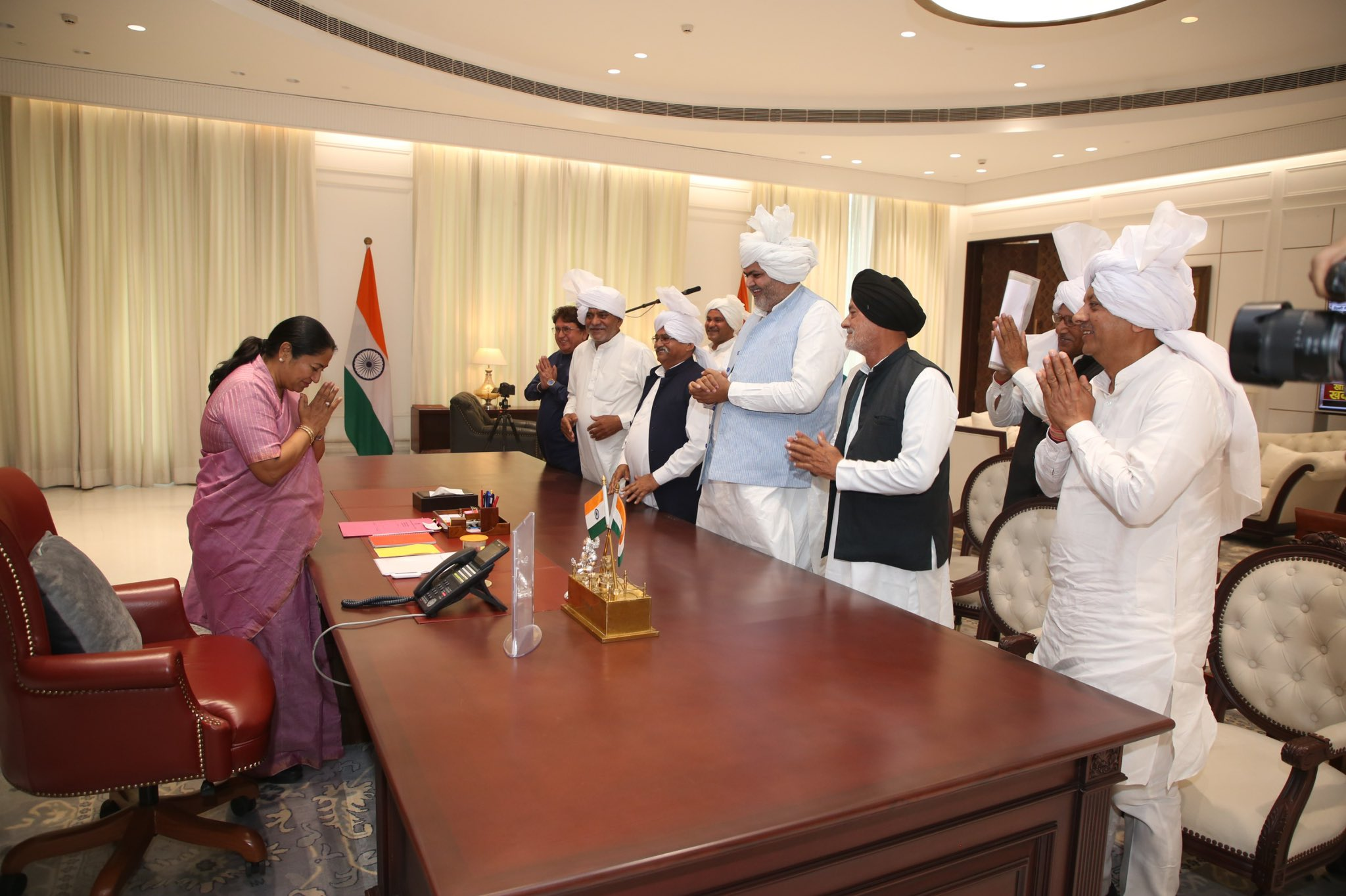
Palam 360 Khap Chaudhary with Delhi CM

The Satrol Khap in Haryana, which allowed inter-caste marriage in 2014, soon reverted its decision as no couple in that Khap is going against previous laws and hence further boycotting inter-caste marriages. The Khap also State that the marriage should not be within the same gotra, village, or neighbouring villages.

A 2015 Sarv Khap meeting launched a "Save Daughters, Educate Daughter" movement.

Several Haryana Khap panchayats organized public meeting to make a call for a strong law against gun violence and vulgar music.

Khap Panchayats, played a significant role in strengthening the farmers' protests, particularly during the 2020-2021 agitation against the controversial farm laws. They provided support, organized rallies, and even formed committees to coordinate with other farmer organizations and instruct that at least one individual from each house should join the protests. Khaps acted as representative bodies for Jat community, advocating for the farmers' demands, particularly the legal guarantee of Minimum Support Price (MSP).

In June 2025, A Khap Panchayat was conducted in Rohtak to address different social issues and to conduct several drives in nearby cities and villages to prohibit same Gotra Marriage and to avoid consumption of Alcohol and Drugs.

The decisions of the patriarchal Khap Panchayats have often been associated with the practice of honour killing. In 2007, a khap panchayat ordered the killing of Manoj and Babli, who married within the same gotra, in spite of their brother-sister relationship. The two were killed by members of Babli's family.

Death Sentence in Honour killing: In State Of Haryana v. Ganga Raj- Delivered on 23 March 2010 in the Manoj Babli Honor Killing case, the sessions Judge Vani Gopal Sharma of Karnal district in Haryana has awarded capital punishment under Section 302 IPC (Indian Penal Code) 1860 to five family members of Babli including her brother Suresh, Uncles Rejender, Baru Ram and cousins Satish and Gurdev for killing the couple on 15 June 2007, considering it the "rarest of rare" case and life sentence to the meeting leader Ganga Raj under Section 302 IPC read with section 120B, IPC for hatching the conspiracy to kill the couple.

== Criticism ==
In recent times, the Khap system has attracted criticism from groups, citing the stark prejudice that such groups allegedly hold against others. The All India Democratic Women's Association (AIDWA) has reported cases where the Khaps are alleged to have initiated threats of murder and violence to couples who marry outside of the circle.

The Supreme Court of India has declared Khap Panchayats to be illegal because they often decree or encourage honour killings or other institutionalised atrocities against boys and girls of different castes and religions who wish to get married or have married.

This is wholly illegal and has to be ruthlessly stamped out. There is nothing honourable in honour killing or other atrocities and, in fact, it is nothing but barbaric and shameful murder. Other atrocities in respect of the personal lives of people committed by brutal, feudal-minded persons deserve harsh punishment. Only this way can we stamp out such acts of barbarism and feudal mentality. Moreover, these acts take the law into their own hands, and amount to kangaroo courts, which are wholly illegal.

In a 2012 report to the Supreme Court, Raju Ramachandran, a Senior Advocate appointed by the Court to assist it in public interest litigation actions against Khap Panchayats, called for the arrest of "self-styled" decision makers and for proactive action by the police to protect the fundamental rights of the people. He also asked for the recommendations to be converted into directions applicable to all states and union territories of India until a law is enacted by the federal parliament.

== Power and influence ==
Despite the criticisms against this institution, it remains popular in some parts of India because, in its benign form, it resolves disputes and achieves social order with less time and resources, compared to the court system which is lengthier and expensive. In addition, taking a case to court may result in community ire.

Sometimes, the Indian government avoids a direct confrontation with the panchayat especially in rural areas. In some cases in Haryana, the police and locally elected leaders have supported the decisions of the khap panchayat.

Former Delhi Chief Minister Arvind Kejriwal in an interview told that, there is no need to ban or intervene in Khap System because they are having their own cultural purpose.

Om Prakash Chautala, the former Chief Minister of Haryana, said in 2004 that "whatever the panchayat decides is right."

Om Prakash Dhankar, member of the Bharatiya Janata Party (BJP), said that khap panchayats "are a deciding factor in the electoral success of a candidate." Prime Minister Narendra Modi paid tributes to former Palam 360 Khap chief Chaudhary Ramkaran Solanki on his fourth death anniversary and lauded the "Cancer Free Delhi Rural" campaign that was launched in his memory."I pay my tribute to respected Chaudhary Ramkaran Solanki ji on his fourth death anniversary. On this occasion, I was happy to know about the Cancer Free Delhi Rural programme organised by Chaudhary Surendra Solanki ji in his memory in Dwarka, Delhi. The work done by Chaudhary Ramkaran Solanki ji for the society and this effort to carry forward his ideals and values is commendable," a letter written by Modi.

== Unofficial caste ==
There are sources that describe the Khap as an unofficial caste system where the panchayat dominates all other members of the group. Like the function of traditional caste and family systems, this Indian traditional institution engages in dispute resolution and the regulation of members' behaviour. The group uses violence to maintain a rigid structure that controls members particularly, women and youths. The panchayats aggressively push tradition and outlook in which caste divisions are desirable while violence towards different castes is normal and acceptable. An important Khap ethos involves the commitment – for the good of the community – to work with one's body, heart and soul under the leadership of its leaders, who are believed to have high moral superiority. For this reason, these leaders are afforded the right to demand a member's life.

== See also ==
- Jirga, similar assembly in Pakistan and Afghanistan
- Mahendra Singh Tikait

== Bibliography ==
- Richards, John F. (1993). The Mughal Empire - Part 1 Volume 5. Cambridge University Press. ISBN 9780521566032.
