= Mohamed Zaghloul =

Egyptian freestyle wrestler

Personal information
- Born: August 31, 1993 (age 32)

Sport
- Country: Egypt
- Sport: Freestyle wrestling

Mohamed Zaghloul (born August 31, 1993) is an Egyptian freestyle wrestler. He competed in the men's freestyle 86 kg event at the 2016 Summer Olympics, in which he was eliminated in the round of 16 by Pedro Ceballos.
