= Literature survey =

Type of lesson

In the tertiary education system of the United States, a literature survey is (typically) a sophomore-level class introducing students to major works of literature of a given culture, language, and period. Literature taught in those classes is often the canonical material of the culture, language, and period; similar classes are taught by history departments as well, with similar objectives: to teach what one manual called "the broad sweep of our civilization's accomplishments".

== See also ==
- Core Curriculum (Columbia College)
