= Nathaniel Tuamoheloa =

American Samoan freestyle wrestler

Personal information
- Born: June 4, 1994 (age 32)
- Height: 1.8 m (5 ft 11 in)
- Weight: 88 kg (194 lb)

Sport
- Country: American Samoa
- Sport: Wrestling
- Event: 96kg Freestyle
- Updated on 6 August 2012

Nathaniel Tuamoheloa (born 4 June 1994) is an American Samoan wrestler. He competed 2012 Summer Olympics in the -96 kg event. He is a Mormon.
