= Padam Singh Dahiya =

Indian politician

Member of the Haryana Legislative Assembly
- In office 2000–2005
- Constituency: Kharkhoda

Personal details
- Born: 4 April 1963 (age 63) Khanda, Kharkhoda, Sonipat
- Party: Indian National Congress
- Parent: Raghbir Singh
- Education: B.A.
- Alma mater: Maharshi Dayanand University
- Occupation: Politician
- Website: padamsinghdahiya.com

Padam Singh Dahiya is an Indian politician. He is from Khanda village in Sonipat district. He was a member of 10th Vidhan Sabha Haryana Legislative Assembly in Sonipat from Indian National Lok Dal Party.

== Career ==
Dahiya entered in politics in 1990 and joined Indian National Lokdal party.

In January 2019, he joined Jannayak Janata Party. He is the President of Jannayak Janta Party in Sonipat district.

In March 2023, Dahiya left Jannayak Janata Party and joined Indian National Congress.
