= Rizak Ram Dahiya =

Indian politician

Rizak Ram

Member of Parliament, Rajya Sabha
- In office 1968–1970
- Constituency: Haryana

Personal details
- Party: Indian National Congress

Rizak Ram Dahiya or Chaudhary Rizak Ram was an Indian politician. He was a Member of Parliament, representing Haryana in the Rajya Sabha, the upper house of India's Parliament, as a member of the Indian National Congress.
