= Dahiya Khap =

Jat clan

Dahiya Khap is a Khap of the Dahiya clan of Jats in Haryana. There are more than 52 villages of Dahiyas in Haryana and the Dahiya clan is one of the largest Hindu Jat clan.

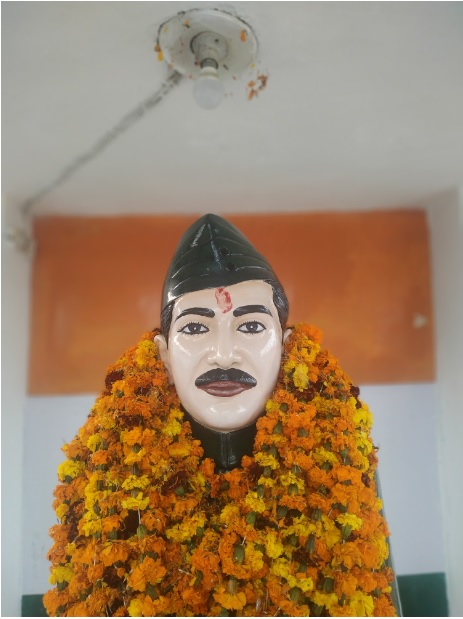
Mehar Singh Dahiya Statue

== Villages of Dahiyas ==
- Akbarpur Barota
- Anandpur
- Ashrafpur
- Badhkhalsa
- Banihari
- Barona
- Barota
- Bhadana
- Bhatgaon
- Bhowapur
- Bidhlan
- Bindhroli
- Birdhana
- Chathera
- Cholka
- Chota Khanda
- Dadam
- Daultabad
- Deoli, Delhi
- Dhanwapur
- Dehman (Fatehabad, HR)
- Gadoli
- Garhi Bala
- Garhi Hakikat
- Garhi Sisana
- Gopalpur
- Gudha
- Halalpur
- Harsoli
- Jhinjholi
- Jharoth
- Jharothi
- Jaji
- Jia Sarai
- Kakroi
- Kanwali
- Khanda Khas
- Khanda Alman
- Kheri Dahiya
- Kheri Manjat
- Khurampur
- Kidholi
- Khizarpur Jat
- Malha Majra
- Mandora
- Mandori
- Matindu
- Mor Kheri
- Mohmadabad
- Nahra
- Nahri
- Nakloi
- Naya Khanda
- Nasirpur
- Nirthan
- Nilothi
- Pelkha
- Pipli
- Pritampura
- Ratangarh
- Rohat
- Rohna
- Sehri
- Silana
- Sisana
- Shamlo Khurd
- Thana Kalan
- Thana Khurd
- Tihar Kalan
- Tihar Khurd
- Turkpur
- Talwandi Bhangerian

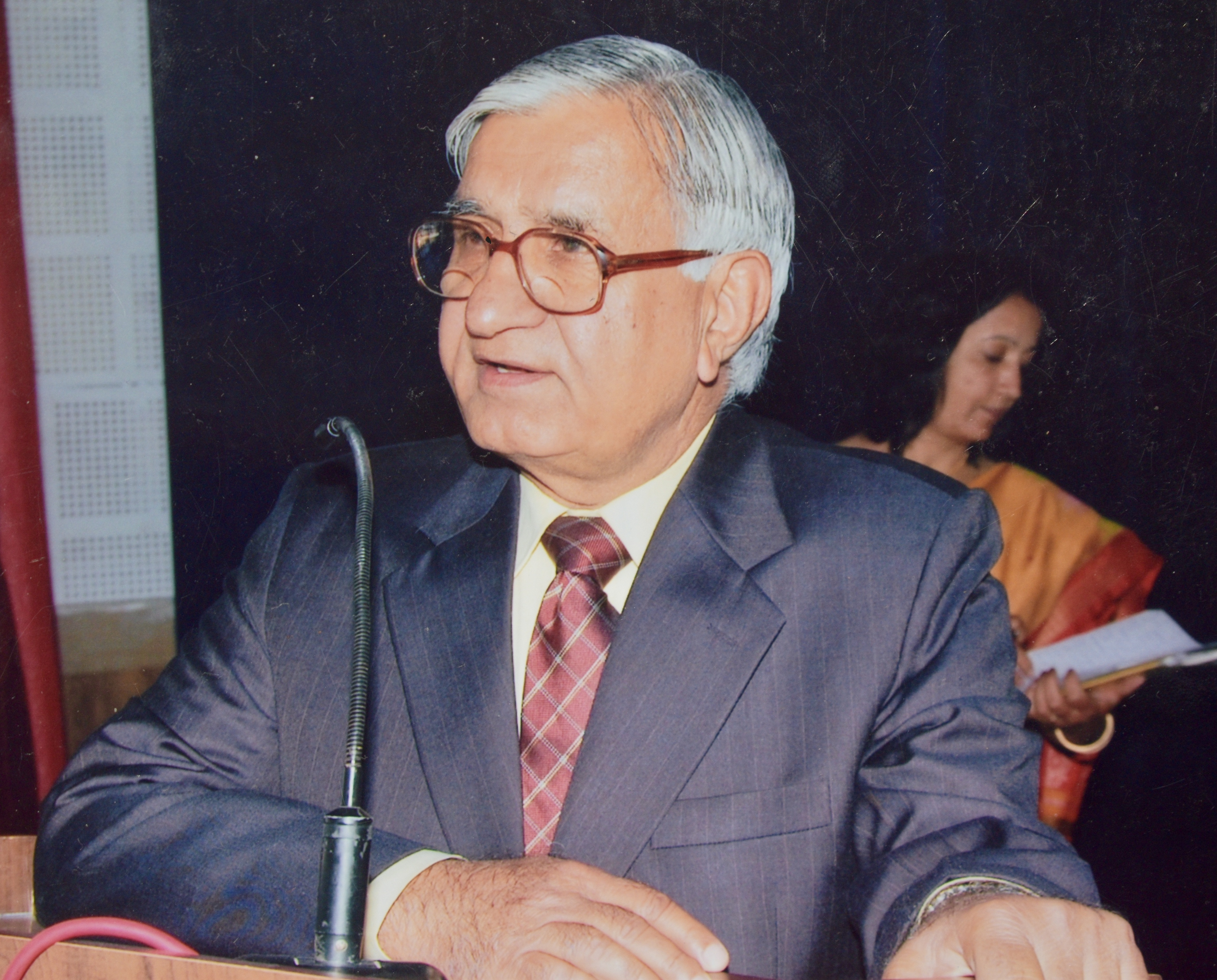
B.S Dahiya, the famous Jat historian
