= Rohit Dahiya =

Indian cricketer (born 1988)

Personal information
- Born: 31 March 1988 (age 38); Khanda, Haryana, India
- Source: Cricinfo, 1 November 2015

Rohit Dahiya (born 31 March 1988) is an Indian first-class cricketer belongs to Khanda, Sonipat. Dahiya plays for Gujarat team.
