= Vinod Kumar Dahiya =

Australian wrestler

Personal information
- Nationality: Australia
- Born: 7 August 1986 (age 40) Khanda, Sonipat, Haryana
- Height: 165 cm (5 ft 5 in)
- Weight: 66 kg (146 lb)

Sport
- Style: Greco-Roman & Free style
- Club: Sparta Wrestling club & IN2Performance
- Coach: Leonid Babira, Kostya (Konstantin Ermakovich)

Vinod Kumar Dahiya Olympic Athlete (born 7 August 1986) is an Indian-Australian Greco-Roman & freestyle Wrestler a competes in the 66 kg category.

== Life and career ==
Dahiya was born on 7 August 1986 in the Indian village of Khanda, Sonipat in Haryana. He began wrestling in 1994, and joined Chhattrasal Stadium, Model Town (Padma Shri Satpal Singh's) coaching akhara in Delhi in 1998.

In 2001, while going to the National Championships in Kerala, Dahiya was pushed out of a moving night train by two men, one of whom was the father of a rival wrestler. Dahiya was discovered in the morning by rail workers who admitted him to a hospital. The injuries left him bed-ridden for a year, during which his weight dropped to 40 kg. His family members rejected the compensation offered by the perpetrators and launched legal action against them.

In 2009, Dahiya finished third at the Australia Cup and decided to move to Australia. He gathered ₹17 lakh from his relatives and by taking loans, and moved to Melbourne in 2010. For few days he trained at the Rocksbank Camblefield, Melbourne. He then went on to Coach Leonid Babira at Sparta Wrestling Club. Due to a shortage of money, he worked as a newspaper hawker, bouncer, security guard and courier boy.

In 2014 he started training under Coach Konstantin Ermakovich at the In2fitness National Training centre. Dahiya acquired Australian citizenship in 2015. He represented Australia for the first time at the 66 kg Greco-Roman event of the 2016 Oceania Wrestling Championships in New Zealand and won the gold medal. By 2016, he had won six national championships in Australia. He won the silver medal at the 2016 African & Oceania Wrestling Olympic Qualification Tournament and qualified for the 2016 Summer Olympics. He thus became the second Indian-born Australian wrestler to qualify for the Olympics. However, in July 2016, he was handed a four-year ban after failing a doping test conducted at the Olympic qualification tournament in April, and was subsequently removed from the Australian Olympic contingent.
