= Indonesian Americans =

Americans of Indonesian birth or descent

Indonesian Americans Orang Indonesia Amerika

Total population
- 147,014 (2023) (ancestry or ethnic origin); 91,521 (2023) (born in Indonesia)

Regions with significant populations
- California (Los Angeles Area, Inland Empire, San Francisco Bay Area); New York (Buffalo, New York City); New Hampshire (Somersworth, Dover); Pennsylvania (Harrisburg, Philadelphia); Texas (Dallas-Fort Worth metroplex, Houston); Hawaii (Honolulu); Virginia (Richmond); Colorado (Denver); Washington, D.C.; Washington (Seattle); Georgia (Atlanta); Oregon (Portland, Salem); Massachusetts (Boston); Arizona (Phoenix); New Jersey (Jersey City, Newark); Florida (Miami, Jacksonville, Orlando); Illinois (Chicago, Champaign)

Languages
- English; Indonesian; Dutch; Javanese; Sundanese; Chinese; Toba Batak; Balinese

Religion
- Christianity 68%; Islam 25%; Buddhism 5%; Hinduism, Irreligion and others 2%

Related ethnic groups
- Other Asian Americans: Malaysian Americans; Singaporean Americans; Chinese Americans; Indonesian Canadians

Indonesian language in the United States

Indonesian Americans are migrants from the multiethnic country of Indonesia to the United States, and their U.S.-born descendants. In both the 2000 and 2010 United States census, they were the 15th largest group of Asian Americans recorded in the United States as well as one of the fastest growing.

== History ==
=== Overview ===
The earliest Indonesian immigrants to the United States were Dutch Indonesian or "Indos" who settled in Southern California in the 1950s as refugees following the Indonesian National Revolution against Dutch colonists. Indonesian international students came to the United States in significant numbers as early as the mid-1950s, beginning with a 1953 International Cooperation Administration (now U.S. Agency for International Development) program to allow University of Indonesia medical faculty to pursue higher studies at the University of California, Berkeley. Permanent settlement in the U.S. began to grow in 1965, due to the Immigration and Nationality Act of 1965, which opened the door to Asian immigration, and the violent and chaotic Transition to the New Order in Indonesia, which spurred emigration from that country. Due to the 1997 Asian financial crisis, between 1980 and 1990, the number of Indonesians in the United States tripled, reaching 30,085. A large proportion live in Southern California: 29,710 respondents to the 2000 census who listed "Indonesian" as one of their ethnicities lived there. Indonesia was one of 25 other countries that participated in a special registration program for its emigrants which started in 2002 as a response to the September 11 attacks against the U.S. Following the 2004 tsunami in the Indian Ocean, there was another surge of immigrants to the East Coast of the U.S. which included many Indonesians.

Between 2000 and 2010, the number of census respondents identifying themselves as Indonesian (either alone or in combination with other responses) grew by 51% from 63,073 to 95,270. Come 2015, this number has augmented again to 113,000 persons according to the Pew Research Center.

=== Chinese Indonesian asylum seekers ===
Active lobbying of politicians by Chinese American groups contributed to an unusually high number of successful Chinese Indonesian applicants for political asylum to the United States in 1998 as an impact of the May 1998 riots in Indonesia. According to the U.S. Department of Justice, 7,359 applicants were granted asylee status and 5,848 were denied in the decade up to 2007. In recent years, however, it has become increasingly difficult for applicants to prove to immigration officials that they would face targeted violence if returned to Indonesia.

In 2004, the U.S. Court of Appeals for the Ninth Circuit ruled in Sael v. Ashcroft that a Chinese Indonesian couple was eligible for political asylum after citing the existence of anti-Chinese violence and of laws that prohibit Chinese schools and institutions. The same court in the following year granted Marjorie Lolong eligibility for asylum after finding that she is "a member of [women and Christian] sub-groups that are at a substantially greater risk of persecution than the [ethnic Chinese] group as a whole." However, the court reversed its findings through an en banc decision and stated that it understood the Board of Immigration Appeals' (BIA) "decision to preclude a general grant of asylum to Indonesian Chinese Christians." The dissenting opinion criticized the BIA's rejection of testimony regarding the Indonesian government's inability to control persecution despite its intentions.

== Demography ==
According to estimates from the American Community Survey for 2015–2019, the total population of Indonesian immigrants in the U.S. was 96,200. Of that number, the top 15 counties of residence were (total estimated for 2019–2023 from the same source was 98,600, updates for that period are in parentheses):

1) Los Angeles County, California – 13,800 (11,800)

2) San Bernardino County, California – 4,800 (4,700)

3) Orange County, California – 4,600 (4,300)

4) Queens County, New York – 2,700 (3,700)

5) Alameda County, California – 2,700 (2,300 - now #8)

6) Santa Clara County, California – 2,500 (2,600 - now #5)

7) Harris County, Texas – 2,500 (1,900 - now #9)

8) Philadelphia County, Pennsylvania – 2,000 (1,800 - now #10)

9) King County, Washington – 1,900 (2,400 - now #7)

10) San Diego County, California – 1,800 (2,500 - now #6)

11)* Riverside County, California – 1,600 (1,300 - now #14)

12) Contra Costa County, California – 1,400 (1,300 - now #15)

13) Snohomish County, Washington – 1,300 (1,300)

14) San Francisco County, California – 1,300 (1,100 - now #18)

15) Maricopa County, Arizona – 1,300 (1,400 - now #12)

- * (Montgomery County, Maryland is now #11 with 1,600)

(Clark County, Nevada is now #16 with 1,300; #17 - #19, all with 1,100 are San Mateo County, California, the previously covered San Francisco County, California and Sacramento County, California; Fairfax County, Virginia is now #20 with 1,000)

=== Ethnicity ===
Indonesian Americans are members of various ethnic subcategories such as Minangkabau, Minahasans, Javanese, Batak, Balinese or Tionghoa. The first Indonesians to move to Southern California were Indos (Indonesians of mixed Native Indonesian and European, mainly Dutch, descent). However, the majority of Indonesians who came in the 1960s were of Chinese descent. Unofficial estimates suggest that as many as 60% of the Indonesians in Southern California are of Chinese descent. Interracial marriage is not uncommon, especially among the young, though the elderly often prefer that their children marry other Indonesian or Chinese.

Many second-generation Indonesian Americans still feel a connection to their Indonesian identity through their ancestry despite often not having a complete grasp on the Indonesian language.

=== Religion ===
Religion of Indonesian Americans
1. Protestantism (48.0%)
2. Roman Catholic (20.0%)
3. Sunni Islam (25.0%)
4. Buddhism (5.00%)
5. Hinduism, Irreligion and others (2.00%)

Indonesian Americans belong to many faiths including Protestantism, Catholicism, Sunni Islam, Buddhism, Hinduism, and Irreligion although the first three are the most common.

While Islam gains its popularity among Indonesian Americans due to Indonesia being one of the largest Muslims majority countries in the world, Christianity is the mostly rapidly growing religious tradition among these communities. The first Indonesian church in the U.S. was a Seventh-day Adventist Church established in Glendale, California in 1972 with a predominantly Indo congregation (now located in Azusa, CA); however, as more pribumi migrants joined the church, racial tensions arose, and the Indos withdrew to other churches. The second Indonesian church to be founded in the U.S. was a Baptist church, started by an ethnic Chinese pastor and with a predominantly ethnic Chinese congregation. By 1988, there were 14 Indonesian Protestant congregations; ten years later, that number had grown to 41, with two Indonesian Catholic congregations as well. Catholicism is most present within Indonesian American communities in states like California, Georgia, New Jersey, or Pennsylvania where mass is offered weekly or monthly in the Indonesian language. Many of the Chinese-Indonesian immigrants of the late 1990s were Christian, and chose to flee their mainland due to fear of persecution.

Indonesian Muslims constituted around 15% of the Indonesian American population in the 1990s. The first Indonesian Mosque in the U.S. was the Al-Hikmah Mosque founded in Astoria, New York, which is currently headed by Shamsi Ali. In 2017, the Indonesian Muslim community in Los Angeles purchased a former church at 1200 Kenmore Avenue and converted it into At-Thohir Mosque. There is also an Indonesian mosque in Silver Spring, Maryland named the IMAAM Center. This mosque is very active today through its regular services and community outreach, as it is an important hub for Indonesian Muslim life in America. Many upper class Indonesians have chosen to assimilate more into American culture due to economic and cultural comforts. From the perspective of those within this community, this can be seen as a divergence from the Indonesian Muslim identity.

=== Workforce ===
Roughly one of every eight Indonesian Americans worked as a cook, waiter, or waitress. Restaurants owned by Indonesian Americans are sites for cultural unity over shared meals and traditions.

According to Pew Research in 2019, households headed by an Indonesian immigrant had a median income of $80,000, compared to $64,000 and $66,000 for all immigrant and U.S.-born households, respectively.

== Media ==
Indonesians have founded a number of publications in California. The earliest was the Indonesian Journal, founded in 1988, and published primarily in the Indonesian language. Others include the Loma Linda-based Actual Indonesia News (founded 1996, also in Indonesian), and the Glendora-based Indonesia Media (founded 1998). Los Angeles-based monthly The Indonesia Letter has the largest circulation.

== Notable people ==
=== Activism ===
- Shandra Woworuntu, former member of U.S. Advisory Council to the White House on Human Trafficking

=== Arts and entertainment ===
- Devi Dja, actress, dancer, and singer
- Joey Alexander, pianist
- Lulu Antariksa, actress and singer
- Carmit Bachar, member of The Pussycat Dolls, singer, dancer, and actress
- Raja Gemini, drag performer
- Michelle Branch, Grammy-winning singer-songwriter
- Mark-Paul Gosselaar, actor, mother is Dutch-Indonesian
- Cynthia Gouw, actress, TV news anchor and host who was named Miss Chinatown USA 1984
- Tania Gunadi, Indonesian-born Hollywood actress
- Brianne Tju, actress
- Steven Ho, martial artist and actor
- Coco Lee, international artist, Hong Kong-based singer-songwriter, actress, (father was an ethnic Chinese from Indonesia while mother was from Hong Kong, China)
- Rory Leidelmeyer, bodybuilder and stuntman
- Lukita Maxwell, actress
- Jolene Marie Rotinsulu, model and beauty pageant titleholder
- Irma Pane, pop singer
- Jodi Ann Paterson, model
- Rich Brian, rapper, singer-songwriter, record producer
- Niki, singer-songwriter
- Yoshi Sudarso, actor, stuntman
- Manohara Odelia Pinot, model
- Alex Van Halen, member of rock group Van Halen, mother was Dutch-Indonesian
- Eddie Van Halen, member of rock group Van Halen, mother was Dutch-Indonesian
- Wolfgang Van Halen, member of rock group Van Halen, son of Eddie
- Armand van Helden, American DJ, record producer, remixer and songwriter
- Stephanie Poetri, singer-songwriter
- Dallas Liu, actor
- Warren Hue, rapper
- Samantha Win, actress, martial artist, stunt woman and wushu taolu athlete
- Valerie Mahaffey, actress from Desperate Housewives

=== Business and technology ===
- Henk Rogers, founder of Bullet Proof software and The Tetris Company (half Dutch)
- Julia S. Gouw, President of East West Bancorp
- Theresia Gouw, Investor/Venture Capitalist
- Leo Koguan, Chairman and co-founder, SHI International
- Sehat Sutardja, Co-Founder of Marvell Technology Group
- Sonita Lontoh, businesswoman

=== Criminals ===
- Harnoko Dewantoro, serial killer
- Rudy Kurniawan, wine fraudster

=== Literature and media ===
- Li-Young Lee, American poet; of ethnic Chinese origin, born in Indonesia
- Patsy Widakuswara, journalist, Voice of America White House Bureau Chief
- Rahadyan Sastrowardoyo, writer, editor, and photographer
- Shamsi Ali, prominent Indonesian Muslim Scholar
- Nadia Bulkin, political scientist, writer
- Innosanto Nagara, children's author, activist

=== Politics ===
- Maya Soetoro-Ng, half-sister of former United States president Barack Obama
- Joyce L. Kennard, Associate Justice of the Supreme Court of California
- Fernande R. V. Duffly, Associate Justice of the Massachusetts Supreme Judicial Court
- Hedy Rijken, member of the Oregon House of Representatives
- Max Rijken, member of the Oregon House of Representatives
- Das Williams, California State Assemblyman

=== Science ===
- Djaja Soejarto, botanist
- Joe Hin Tjio, cytogeneticist
- Willem Jacob Luyten, astronomer

=== Sports ===
- Arki Dikania Wisnu, basketball player
- Brandon Jawato, basketball player
- Nigel van Oostrum, basketball player
- Rudy Gunawan, world champion badminton player
- Tony Gunawan, world champion, Olympic gold medalist, and badminton player
- Bilal Hasan, UFC Fighter
- Halim Haryanto, All England, world champion badminton player
- Jenna Gozali, badminton player
- John Juanda, professional poker player
- Chris Limahelu, American football player
- Ryan Santoso, American football player
- Kyle Winter, rugby union player
- Gerald Item, swimmer
- Gavin Kwan Adsit, footballer
- Katarina Stalin, footballer
- Ethan Kohler, footballer
- Adrian Wibowo, footballer
- Althaf Khan, footballer
- Sydney Hopper, footballer

== See also ==
- Permias
- Indonesia–United States relations

== Sources ==
- Lee, Jonathan H. X.; Nadeau, Kathleen M. (2011). Encyclopedia of Asian American folklore and folklife. Santa Barbara, Calif.: ABC-CLIO. ISBN 978-0-313-35067-2. OCLC 701335337. pp 515–566.
- Lie, Anita; Wijaya, Juliana; Kuntjara, Esther (May 31, 2018). "Linguistic and cultural identity of Indonesian Americans in The United States". Indonesian Journal of Applied Linguistics. 8 (1). Universitas Pendidikan Indonesia (UPI). doi:10.17509/ijal.v8i1.11468. ISSN 2502-6747.
- Husin, Asna (August 13, 2019). "Being Muslim in a Secular World: Indonesian Muslim Families in the Washington DC, USA". Studia Islamika. 26 (2). Studia Islamika, Center for the Study of Islam and Society (PPIM) Syarif Hidayatullah State Islamic University of Jakarta. doi:10.15408/sdi.v26i2.8412 (inactive September 6, 2026). ISSN 2355-6145.
- Budiman, Abby. "Indonesians in the U.S. Fact Sheet." Pew Research Center. 2021. online
- Yang, Eveline (2001), "Indonesian Americans", in Lehman, Jeffrey (ed.), Gale Encyclopedia of Multicultural America, vol. 2 (second ed.), Gale Group, pp. 897–905, ISBN 978-0-7876-3986-0
- Barnes, Jessica S.; Bennett, Claudette E. (February 2002), The Asian Population: 2000 (PDF), U.S. Census 2000, U.S. Department of Commerce
- Cunningham, Clark E. (2009), "Unity and Diversity among Indonesian Migrants to the United States", in Ling, Huping (ed.), Emerging Voices: Experiences of Underrepresented Asian Americans, Rutgers University Press, pp. 90–125, ISBN 978-0-8135-4342-0
- Sukmana, Damai (January 2009), "Game of Chance: Chinese Indonesians Play Asylum Roulette in the United States", Inside Indonesia, 95, ISSN 0814-1185, archived from the original on April 25, 2009
