= List of largest U.S. municipalities by race/ethnicity in 2020 =

This is a list of the largest municipalities in the United States by race/ethnicity (80,000+) using 2020 U.S. census data. It includes a sortable table of population by race/ethnicity. The table excludes Hispanics from the racial categories, assigning them to their own category. The table also excludes all mixed raced/multiracial persons from the racial categories, assigning them to their own category. The list only includes incorporated places and their equivalents (municipalities in Puerto Rico, charter townships in Michigan, and townships/boroughs in New Jersey and Pennsylvania). It also includes a number of consolidated city-counties. It does not list census designated places due to their lack of incorporation.

== Racial / Ethnic Profile of the largest U.S. Cities (80,000+) in 2020 ==
Majority minority with no dominant group
Majority White
Majority Black
Majority Hispanic
Majority Asian

Racial / Ethnic profile of the largest U.S. cities (2020 census) (NH = non-Hispanic)
City	State	Total Population	White alone (NH)	%	Black or African American alone (NH)	%	Native American or Alaska Native alone (NH)	%	Asian alone (NH)	%	Pacific Islander alone (NH)	%	Other Race alone (NH)	%	Mixed Race or Multiracial (NH)	%	Hispanic or Latino (any race)	%	Notes/Comments
New York City	New York	8,804,190	2,719,856	30.89%	1,776,891	20.18%	19,146	0.22%	1,373,502	15.60%	3,302	0.04%	121,184	1.38%	299,959	3.41%	2,490,350	28.29%	
Los Angeles	California	3,898,747	1,126,052	28.88%	322,553	8.27%	6,614	0.17%	454,585	11.66%	4,573	0.12%	26,351	0.68%	128,028	3.28%	1,829,991	46.94%	
Chicago	Illinois	2,746,388	863,622	31.45%	787,551	28.68%	3,332	0.12%	189,857	6.91%	529	0.02%	11,536	0.42%	70,443	2.56%	819,518	29.84%	The Hispanic population exceeded the Black population for the first time in the 2020 Census
Houston	Texas	2,304,580	545,989	23.69%	509,479	22.11%	3,669	0.16%	165,189	7.17%	960	0.04%	11,884	0.52%	53,987	2.34%	1,013,423	43.97%	
Phoenix	Arizona	1,608,139	671,751	41.77%	118,527	7.37%	25,833	1.61%	63,996	3.98%	3,161	0.20%	8,025	0.50%	55,272	3.44%	661,574	41.14%	
Philadelphia	Pennsylvania	1,603,797	550,828	34.35%	613,835	38.27%	2,596	0.16%	132,408	8.26%	579	0.04%	11,419	0.71%	53,855	3.36%	238,277	14.86%	
San Antonio	Texas	1,434,625	335,813	23.41%	93,810	6.54%	3,113	0.22%	45,491	3.17%	1,570	0.11%	5,525	0.39%	33,293	2.32%	916,010	63.85%	
San Diego	California	1,386,932	565,128	40.75%	77,542	5.59%	3,200	0.23%	243,528	17.55%	4,887	0.35%	8,208	0.59%	73,243	5.28%	411,286	29.65%	
Dallas	Texas	1,304,379	366,393	28.09%	298,764	22.90%	2,933	0.22%	47,820	3.67%	458	0.04%	4,995	0.38%	31,842	2.44%	551,174	42.26%	
San Jose	California	1,013,240	236,095	23.30%	27,422	2.71%	1,921	0.19%	386,993	38.19%	3,460	0.34%	4,808	0.47%	36,275	3.58%	316,266	31.21%	
Austin	Texas	961,855	452,994	47.10%	66,002	6.86%	2,002	0.21%	85,853	8.93%	528	0.05%	4,841	0.50%	37,187	3.87%	312,448	32.48%	
Jacksonville	Florida	949,611	435,795	47.79%	284,328	29.94%	2,203	0.23%	47,821	5.04%	938	0.10%	6,623	0.70%	43,822	4.61%	110,081	11.59%	
Fort Worth	Texas	918,915	336,623	36.63%	176,556	19.21%	2,934	0.32%	46,991	5.11%	992	0.11%	3,498	0.38%	31,485	3.43%	319,836	34.81%	
Columbus	Ohio	905,748	470,705	51.97%	256,509	28.32%	1,632	0.18%	55,932	6.18%	325	0.04%	5,369	0.59%	45,097	4.98%	70,179	7.75%	
Indianapolis	Indiana	887,642	444,504	50.08%	245,279	27.63%	1,627	0.18%	37,588	4.23%	331	0.04%	4,940	0.56%	37,152	4.19%	116,221	13.09%	
Charlotte	North Carolina	874,579	347,363	39.72%	284,206	32.50%	2,177	0.25%	61,420	7.02%	427	0.05%	5,632	0.64%	30,650	3.50%	142,704	16.32%	
San Francisco	California	873,965	341,306	39.05%	45,071	5.16%	1,570	0.18%	294,220	33.66%	3,244	0.37%	6,347	0.73%	45,446	5.20%	136,761	15.65%	
Seattle	Washington	737,015	438,168	59.45%	50,234	6.82%	3,268	0.44%	124,696	16.92%	1,941	0.26%	4,473	0.61%	53,672	7.28%	60,563	8.22%	
Denver	Colorado	715,522	388,764	54.33%	61,098	8.54%	3,740	0.52%	27,198	3.80%	1,395	0.19%	3,746	0.52%	30,121	4.21%	199,460	27.88%	
Nashville	Tennessee	689,447	367,397	53.29%	167,795	24.34%	1,264	0.18%	27,172	3.94%	267	0.04%	3,147	0.46%	26,056	3.78%	96,349	13.97%	
Oklahoma City	Oklahoma	681,054	337,063	49.49%	93,767	13.77%	18,757	2.75%	31,163	4.58%	971	0.14%	2,700	0.40%	51,872	7.62%	144,761	21.26%	
Washington D.C.	District of Columbia	689,545	261,771	37.96%	282,066	40.91%	1,277	0.19%	33,192	4.81%	349	0.05%	3,753	0.54%	29,485	4.28%	77,652	11.26%	The Black population fell below 50% in the 2020 Census
El Paso	Texas	678,815	83,301	12.27%	21,098	3.11%	1,653	0.24%	9,123	1.34%	1,195	0.18%	1,985	0.29%	8,947	1.32%	551,513	81.25%	
Boston	Massachusetts	675,647	301,464	44.62%	129,264	19.13%	989	0.15%	75,588	11.19%	251	0.04%	9,257	1.37%	32,721	4.84%	126,113	18.67%	
Portland	Oregon	652,503	433,445	66.43%	36,975	5.67%	4,273	0.65%	52,245	8.01%	3,755	0.58%	4,118	0.63%	45,356	6.95%	72,336	11.09%	
Las Vegas	Nevada	641,903	259,561	40.44%	79,129	12.33%	2,291	0.36%	44,995	7.01%	4,204	0.65%	3,855	0.60%	34,040	5.30%	213,828	33.31%	
Memphis	Tennessee	633,104	151,581	23.94%	387,964	61.28%	1,007	0.16%	11,503	1.82%	141	0.02%	2,425	0.38%	16,316	2.58%	62,167	9.82%	
Louisville	Kentucky	633,045	382,096	60.36%	147,069	23.23%	1,206	0.19%	21,034	3.32%	493	0.08%	3,064	0.48%	27,900	4.41%	50,183	7.93%	Merged with Jefferson County in 2003. Population for the city is listed as the original city of Louisville plus the incorporated cities of the county. Unincorporated areas are not included in the city's population despite sharing a common government.
Detroit	Michigan	639,111	60,770	9.51%	493,212	77.17%	1,399	0.22%	10,085	1.58%	111	0.02%	3,066	0.48%	19,199	3.00%	51,269	8.02%	
Baltimore	Maryland	585,708	157,296	26.86%	335,615	57.30%	1,278	0.22%	21,020	3.59%	152	0.03%	3,332	0.57%	21,088	3.60%	45,927	7.84%	
Milwaukee	Wisconsin	577,222	186,419	32.30%	218,273	37.81%	2,365	0.41%	29,969	5.19%	166	0.03%	2,971	0.51%	20,753	3.60%	116,306	20.15%	
Albuquerque	New Mexico	564,559	212,966	37.72%	16,649	2.95%	25,195	4.46%	18,041	3.20%	483	0.09%	2,888	0.51%	19,099	3.38%	269,238	47.69%	
Tucson	Arizona	542,629	236,837	43.65%	27,702	5.11%	9,197	1.69%	16,336	3.01%	1,328	0.24%	2,518	0.46%	19,833	3.65%	228,878	42.18%	
Fresno	California	542,107	129,705	23.93%	37,611	6.94%	3,501	0.65%	77,243	14.25%	766	0.14%	2,918	0.54%	16,592	3.06%	273,771	50.50%	
Sacramento	California	524,943	158,999	30.29%	66,012	12.58%	2,480	0.47%	102,200	19.47%	8,282	1.58%	3,517	0.67%	32,200	6.13%	151,253	28.81%	
Kansas City	Missouri	508,090	268,273	52.80%	130,983	25.78%	1,854	0.36%	15,793	3.11%	1,456	0.29%	2,366	0.47%	26,396	5.20%	60,969	12.00%	
Mesa	Arizona	504,258	300,502	59.59%	18,819	3.93%	9,754	1.93%	12,725	2.52%	1,892	0.38%	2,250	0.45%	19,826	3.93%	137,490	27.27%	
Atlanta	Georgia	498,715	192,148	38.53%	233,018	46.72%	767	0.15%	22,208	4.45%	171	0.03%	2,493	0.50%	17,922	3.59%	29,988	6.01%	
Omaha	Nebraska	486,051	302,548	62.25%	59,347	12.21%	2,419	0.50%	22,184	4.56%	379	0.08%	1,999	0.41%	21,612	4.45%	75,563	15.55%	
Colorado Springs	Colorado	478,961	312,752	65.30%	26,368	5.51%	2,504	0.52%	15,672	3.27%	1,392	0.29%	2,831	0.59%	29,545	6.17%	87,897	18.35%	
Raleigh	North Carolina	467,665	241,308	51.60%	120,480	25.76%	1,094	0.23%	23,444	5.01%	179	0.04%	2,647	0.57%	17,999	3.85%	60,514	12.94%	
Long Beach	California	466,742	121,970	26.13%	55,894	11.98%	1,119	0.24%	59,308	12.71%	3,937	0.84%	2,736	0.59%	19,781	4.24%	201,997	43.28%	
Virginia Beach	Virginia	459,470	269,566	58.67%	82,583	17.97%	1,184	0.26%	33,756	7.35%	671	0.15%	2,599	0.57%	28,707	6.25%	40,404	8.79%	
Miami	Florida	442,241	61,829	13.98%	52,447	11.86%	243	0.05%	5,789	1.31%	35	0.01%	2,555	0.58%	8,871	2.01%	310,472	70.20%	
Oakland	California	440,646	120,187	27.28%	91,561	20.78%	1,371	0.31%	69,906	15.86%	2,668	0.61%	2,964	0.67%	25,146	5.71%	126,843	28.79%	
Minneapolis	Minnesota	429,954	249,581	58.05%	81,088	18.86%	5,184	1.21%	24,743	5.75%	171	0.04%	2,136	0.50%	22,538	5.24%	44,513	10.35%	
Tulsa	Oklahoma	413,066	200,257	48.48%	60,505	14.65%	18,975	4.59%	14,157	3.43%	857	0.21%	1,548	0.37%	37,710	9.13%	79,057	19.14%	
Bakersfield	California	403,455	116,311	28.83%	26,402	6.54%	2,153	0.53%	30,268	7.50%	505	0.13%	2,430	0.60%	12,564	3.11%	212,822	52.75%	
Wichita	Kansas	397,532	233,703	58.79%	42,228	10.62%	3,400	0.86%	19,991	5.03%	429	0.11%	1,585	0.40%	23,410	5.89%	72,786	18.31%	
Arlington	Texas	394,266	137,731	34.93%	88,230	22.38%	1,213	0.31%	30,067	7.63%	429	0.11%	1,679	0.43%	13,973	3.54%	120,944	30.68%	
Aurora	Colorado	386,261	160,950	41.67%	59,232	15.33%	1,679	0.43%	24,480	6.34%	1,549	0.40%	2,213	0.57%	19,256	4.99%	116,902	30.27%	
Tampa	Florida	384,959	166,775	43.32%	80,583	20.93%	741	0.19%	20,587	5.35%	246	0.06%	2,746	0.71%	14,660	3.81%	98,621	25.62%	
New Orleans	Louisiana	373,977	121,385	31.31%	205,876	53.61%	761	0.20%	10,573	2.75%	125	0.03%	2,075	0.54%	12,185	3.17%	31,017	8.08%	
Cleveland	Ohio	372,624	119,547	32.08%	176,813	47.45%	844	0.23%	10,390	2.79%	100	0.03%	1,970	0.53%	14,261	3.83%	48,699	13.07%	
Honolulu	Hawaii	350,964	54,137	15.43%	5,663	1.61%	373	0.11%	183,712	52.34%	31,459	8.96%	1,025	0.29%	52,613	14.99%	21,982	6.26%	
Anaheim	California	346,824	78,237	22.56%	8,465	2.44%	646	0.19%	60,632	17.48%	1,297	0.37%	1,485	0.43%	9,411	2.71%	186,651	53.82%	Majority Latino since the 2010 census
Lexington	Kentucky	322,570	215,343	66.76%	47,501	14.73%	480	0.15%	13,374	4.15%	133	0.04%	1,667	0.52%	14,322	4.44%	29,750	9.22%	
Stockton	California	320,804	54,765	17.07%	38,178	11.90%	1,237	0.39%	67,738	21.12%	2,440	0.76%	1,608	0.50%	13,237	4.13%	141,601	44.14%	
Henderson	Nevada	317,610	186,109	58.60%	20,288	6.39%	1,253	0.39%	28,930	9.11%	2,225	0.70%	1,748	0.55%	20,093	6.33%	56,964	17.94%	
Corpus Christi	Texas	317,863	96,019	30.21%	12,419	3.91%	847	0.27%	7,519	2.37%	268	0.08%	1,144	0.36%	6,657	2.09%	192,990	60.71%	
Riverside	California	314,998	87,213	27.69%	18,832	5.98%	1,195	0.38%	22,450	7.13%	951	0.30%	1,704	0.54%	10,267	3.26%	172,386	54.73%	
Newark	New Jersey	311,549	24,916	8.00%	147,905	47.47%	572	0.18%	4,871	1.56%	63	0.02%	7,379	2.37%	12,469	4.00%	113,374	36.39%	
Santa Ana	California	310,227	26,428	8.52%	2,745	0.88%	485	0.16%	37,440	12.07%	635	0.20%	921	0.30%	3,541	1.14%	238,022	76.73%	
Cincinnati	Ohio	309,317	145,100	46.91%	124,654	40.30%	475	0.15%	7,767	2.51%	139	0.04%	1,691	0.55%	13,655	4.41%	15,836	5.12%	
Irvine	California	307,670	106,056	34.47%	6,646	2.16%	285	0.09%	139,725	45.41%	341	0.11%	1,790	0.58%	16,972	5.52%	35,855	11.65%	
Orlando	Florida	307,573	103,010	33.49%	70,183	22.81%	446	0.15%	12,984	4.22%	177	0.06%	3,908	1.27%	15,804	5.14%	101,061	32.86%	
Saint Paul	Minnesota	311,527	151,987	48.79%	51,253	16.45%	2,112	0.68%	59,755	19.18%	117	0.04%	1,488	0.48%	14,731	4.73%	30,084	9.66%	
Pittsburgh	Pennsylvania	302,971	187,099	61.75%	68,314	22.55%	475	0.16%	19,745	6.52%	96	0.03%	2,081	0.69%	13,541	4.47%	11,620	3.84%	
Greensboro	North Carolina	299,035	115,426	38.60%	123,853	41.42%	985	0.33%	15,069	5.04%	128	0.04%	1,534	0.51%	11,621	3.89%	30,419	10.17%	
Jersey City	New Jersey	292,449	69,624	23.81%	54,199	18.53%	638	0.22%	81,425	27.84%	101	0.03%	4,204	1.44%	9,481	3.24%	72,777	24.89%	
Anchorage	Alaska	291,247	158,232	54.33%	13,777	4.73%	22,480	7.72%	27,281	9.37%	9,844	3.38%	1,922	0.66%	31,273	10.74%	26,438	9.08%	
Lincoln	Nebraska	291,082	222,749	76.52%	13,224	4.54%	1,644	0.56%	13,765	4.73%	162	0.06%	1,282	0.44%	13,322	4.58%	24,934	8.57%	
Plano	Texas	285,494	132,194	46.30%	25,026	8.77%	845	0.30%	68,738	24.08%	133	0.05%	1,330	0.47%	11,429	4.00%	45,799	16.04%	
Durham	North Carolina	283,506	109,401	38.59%	101,422	35.78%	593	0.21%	15,917	5.61%	64	0.02%	1,598	0.56%	11,021	3.89%	43,470	15.33%	
St. Louis	Missouri	301,578	129,368	42.90%	128,993	42.77%	614	0.20%	12,205	4.05%	88	0.03%	1,773	0.59%	13,132	4.35%	15,405	5.11%	
Chandler	Arizona	275,987	147,119	53.31%	15,564	5.64%	3,850	1.39%	32,710	11.85%	571	0.21%	1,237	0.45%	12,679	4.59%	62,257	22.56%	
North Las Vegas	Nevada	115,488	42,880	37.13%	21,528	18.64%	565	0.49%	3,604	3.12%	547	0.47%	143	0.12%	2,786	2.41%	43,435	37.61%	
Chula Vista	California	275,487	43,720	15.87%	12,703	4.61%	488	0.18%	40,841	14.83%	1,140	0.41%	1,175	0.43%	10,722	3.89%	164,698	59.78%	
Buffalo	New York	278,349	108,652	39.03%	99,102	35.60%	1,359	0.49%	21,119	7.59%	109	0.04%	1,387	0.50%	10,978	3.94%	35,643	12.81%	
Gilbert	Arizona	267,918	178,671	66.69%	9,601	3.58%	1,998	0.75%	17,690	6.60%	574	0.21%	1,211	0.45%	13,041	4.87%	45,132	16.85%	
Reno	Nevada	264,165	152,015	57.55%	7,575	2.87%	1,881	0.71%	18,344	6.94%	1,917	0.73%	1,389	0.53%	14,064	5.32%	66,980	25.36%	
Madison	Wisconsin	269,840	186,764	69.21%	19,557	7.25%	710	0.26%	25,547	9.47%	140	0.05%	1,158	0.43%	12,556	4.65%	23,408	9.67%	
Fort Wayne	Indiana	263,886	165,865	62.85%	39,560	14.99%	627	0.24%	15,229	5.77%	108	0.04%	1,517	0.57%	13,084	4.96%	27,896	10.57%	
Toledo	Ohio	270,871	150,202	55.45%	76,401	28.21%	651	0.24%	3,133	1.16%	83	0.03%	1,371	0.51%	14,894	5.50%	24,136	8.91%	
Lubbock	Texas	257,141	122,337	47.58%	24,599	9.57%	1,225	0.48%	9,236	3.59%	156	0.06%	811	0.32%	7,232	2.81%	91,545	35.60%	
St. Petersburg	Florida	258,308	159,792	61.86%	53,345	20.65%	520	0.20%	8,942	3.46%	121	0.05%	1,441	0.56%	10,858	4.20%	23,289	9.02%	
Laredo	Texas	255,205	9,181	3.60%	773	0.30%	131	0.05%	1,290	0.51%	25	0.01%	450	0.18%	537	0.21%	242,818	95.15%	
Irving	Texas	256,684	53,982	21.03%	31,714	12.36%	733	0.29%	57,301	22.32%	250	0.10%	1,227	0.48%	6,008	2.34%	105,469	41.09%	
Chesapeake	Virginia	249,422	135,679	54.40%	70,885	28.42%	731	0.29%	8,868	3.56%	312	0.13%	1,223	0.49%	13,900	5.57%	17,824	7.15%	
Glendale	Arizona	248,325	107,695	43.37%	17,872	7.20%	3,030	1.22%	11,272	4.54%	492	0.20%	1,171	0.47%	9,176	3.70%	97,617	39.31%	
Winston-Salem	North Carolina	249,545	109,714	43.97%	79,788	31.97%	607	0.24%	6,275	2.51%	191	0.08%	1,140	0.46%	8,989	3.60%	42,841	17.17%	
Scottsdale	Arizona	241,361	189,510	78.52%	4,601	1.91%	1,477	0.61%	11,949	4.95%	214	0.09%	1,117	0.46%	8,960	3.71%	23,533	9.75%	
Garland	Texas	246,018	67,190	27.31%	36,327	14.77%	619	0.25%	29,221	11.88%	78	0.03%	941	0.38%	6,697	2.72%	104,945	42.66%	
Boise	Idaho	235,684	185,838	78.85%	5,142	2.18%	1,145	0.49%	8,293	3.52%	640	0.27%	1,331	0.56%	12,019	5.10%	21,276	9.03%	
Norfolk	Virginia	238,005	97,205	40.84%	93,553	39.31%	832	0.35%	8,828	3.71%	475	0.20%	1,331	0.56%	12,651	5.32%	23,130	9.72%	
Port St. Lucie	Florida	204,851	108,020	52.73%	36,659	17.90%	306	0.15%	4,304	2.10%	100	0.05%	1,928	0.94%	8,923	4.36%	44,611	21.78%	
Spokane	Washington	228,989	176,397	77.03%	5,921	2.59%	3,726	1.63%	6,407	2.80%	2,665	1.16%	1,211	0.53%	16,604	7.25%	16,058	7.01%	
Richmond	California	116,448	18,985	16.30%	21,753	18.68%	266	0.23%	16,460	14.14%	609	0.52%	1,243	1.07%	5,220	4.48%	51,912	44.58%	
Fremont	California	230,504	38,160	16.56%	5,108	2.22%	470	0.20%	146,875	63.72%	967	0.42%	1,315	0.57%	8,593	3.73%	29,016	12.59%	
Huntsville	Alabama	215,006	118,616	55.17%	62,360	29.00%	854	0.40%	5,399	2.51%	265	0.12%	878	0.41%	9,965	4.63%	16,669	7.75%	
Tacoma	Washington	219,346	120,118	54.76%	21,708	9.90%	2,910	1.33%	19,932	9.09%	4,174	1.90%	1,399	0.64%	20,090	9.16%	29,015	13.23%	
Baton Rouge	Louisiana	227,470	77,829	34.22%	121,799	53.55%	382	0.17%	7,294	3.21%	67	0.03%	784	0.34%	5,797	2.55%	13,518	5.94%	
Santa Clarita	California	228,673	101,794	44.52%	9,046	3.96%	458	0.20%	26,797	11.72%	291	0.13%	1,309	0.57%	10,243	4.48%	78,735	34.43%	
San Bernardino	California	222,101	28,649	12.90%	26,134	11.77%	742	0.33%	8,734	3.93%	754	0.34%	1,123	0.51%	4,840	2.18%	151,125	68.04%	
Hialeah	Florida	223,109	9,684	4.34%	1,380	0.62%	68	0.03%	877	0.39%	12	0.01%	534	0.24%	770	0.35%	209,784	94.03%	
Frisco	Texas	200,509	96,248	48.00%	17,683	8.82%	611	0.30%	52,672	26.27%	110	0.05%	1,049	0.52%	9,120	4.55%	23,016	11.48%	
Modesto	California	218,464	84,592	38.72%	8,103	3.71%	1,175	0.54%	16,929	7.75%	2,181	1.00%	1,190	0.54%	10,561	4.83%	93,733	42.91%	
Cape Coral	Florida	194,016	129,017	66.50%	7,597	3.92%	350	0.18%	3,207	1.65%	87	0.04%	958	0.49%	6,649	3.43%	46,151	23.79%	
Fontana	California	208,393	25,883	12.42%	17,658	8.47%	489	0.23%	16,992	8.15%	447	0.21%	1,212	0.58%	4,443	2.13%	141,269	67.79%	
Moreno Valley	California	208,634	27,670	13.26%	31,582	15.14%	536	0.26%	12,099	5.80%	1,009	0.48%	1,227	0.59%	6,343	3.04%	128,168	61.43%	
Des Moines	Iowa	214,133	130,599	60.99%	24,538	11.46%	597	0.28%	14,348	6.70%	124	0.06%	817	0.38%	9,630	4.50%	33,480	15.64%	
Rochester	New York	211,328	69,792	33.03%	80,459	38.07%	490	0.23%	8,403	3.98%	62	0.03%	1,004	0.48%	9,249	4.38%	41,869	19.81%	
Fayetteville	North Carolina	208,501	71,917	34.49%	87,913	41.82%	1,993	0.96%	6,487	3.11%	980	0.47%	1,382	0.66%	12,280	5.89%	26,269	12.60%	
Yonkers	New York	211,569	68,970	32.60%	33,509	15.84%	330	0.16%	12,915	6.10%	34	0.02%	1,833	0.87%	4,913	2.32%	89,065	42.10%	
McKinney	Texas	195,308	102,549	52.51%	24,769	12.68%	713	0.37%	23,891	12.23%	157	0.08%	852	0.44%	8,985	4.60%	33,392	17.10%	
Worcester	Massachusetts	206,518	101,039	48.93%	28,378	13.74%	336	0.16%	14,562	7.05%	48	0.02%	2,642	1.28%	8,777	4.25%	50,736	24.57%	
Salt Lake City	Utah	199,723	126,678	63.43%	5,466	2.74%	1,563	0.78%	10,840	5.43%	4,075	2.04%	1,149	0.58%	8,448	4.23%	41,504	20.78%	
Little Rock	Arkansas	202,591	85,401	42.15%	81,339	40.15%	497	0.25%	7,099	3.50%	69	0.03%	761	0.38%	6,958	3.43%	20,467	10.10%	
Columbus	Georgia	206,922	79,083	38.22%	94,701	45.77%	488	0.24%	5,546	2.68%	517	0.25%	1,076	0.52%	8,998	4.35%	16,513	7.98%	Consolidated city-county with Muscogee County
Augusta	Georgia	202,081	65,721	32.52%	111,535	55.19%	480	0.24%	3,898	1.93%	386	0.19%	880	0.44%	7,910	3.91%	11,271	5.58%	Consolidated city-county with Richmond County
Sioux Falls	South Dakota	192,517	149,423	77.62%	12,069	6.27%	4,745	2.46%	5,269	2.74%	69	0.04%	534	0.28%	8,139	4.23%	12,269	6.37%	
Grand Prairie	Texas	196,100	39,303	20.04%	46,360	23.64%	670	0.34%	14,778	7.54%	172	0.09%	792	0.40%	5,276	2.69%	88,749	45.26%	
Tallahassee	Florida	196,169	94,095	47.97%	67,503	34.41%	398	0.20%	8,665	4.42%	100	0.05%	924	0.47%	7,821	3.99%	16,663	8.49%	
Amarillo	Texas	200,393	104,026	51.91%	13,808	6.89%	1,053	0.53%	8,025	4.09%	55	0.03%	851	0.42%	7,093	3.54%	65,302	32.59%	
Oxnard	California	202,063	26,415	13.07%	4,235	2.10%	392	0.19%	14,987	7.42%	489	0.24%	772	0.38%	3,789	1.88%	150,984	74.72%	
Peoria	Arizona	190,985	126,300	66.13%	7,028	3.68%	1,283	0.67%	8,557	4.48%	245	0.13%	767	0.40%	7,994	4.19%	38,811	20.32%	
Overland Park	Kansas	197,238	144,363	73.19%	8,854	4.49%	426	0.22%	18,311	9.28%	87	0.04%	825	0.42%	8,949	4.54%	15,423	7.82%	
Montgomery	Alabama	200,603	57,071	28.45%	120,349	59.99%	322	0.16%	7,171	3.57%	105	0.05%	648	0.32%	5,268	2.63%	9,669	4.82%	
Birmingham	Alabama	200,733	45,993	22.91%	136,731	68.12%	346	0.17%	3,255	1.62%	109	0.05%	575	0.29%	4,450	2.22%	9,274	4.62%	
Grand Rapids	Michigan	198,917	114,290	57.46%	36,493	18.35%	659	0.33%	4,483	2.25%	70	0.04%	916	0.46%	9,209	4.63%	32,797	16.49%	
Knoxville	Tennessee	190,740	130,036	68.17%	30,123	15.79%	547	0.29%	4,323	2.27%	105	0.06%	830	0.44%	9,616	5.04%	15,160	7.95%	
Vancouver	Washington	190,915	126,109	66.06%	5,914	3.10%	1,282	0.67%	10,198	5.34%	3,309	1.73%	959	0.50%	12,603	6.60%	30,541	16.00%	
Huntington Beach	California	198,711	117,536	59.15%	2,111	1.06%	443	0.22%	25,921	13.04%	532	0.27%	1,234	0.62%	11,477	5.78%	39,457	19.86%	
Providence	Rhode Island	190,934	61,917	32.43%	22,429	11.75%	905	0.47%	11,359	5.95%	66	0.03%	2,167	1.13%	8,276	4.33%	83,815	43.90%	
Brownsville	Texas	186,738	8,968	4.80%	414	0.22%	85	0.05%	1,057	0.57%	24	0.01%	336	0.18%	544	0.29%	175,310	93.88%	
Glendale	California	196,543	122,519	62.34%	3,365	1.71%	203	0.10%	29,461	14.99%	120	0.06%	709	0.36%	6,591	3.35%	33,575	17.08%	
Akron	Ohio	190,469	102,825	53.99%	59,286	31.13%	356	0.19%	10,042	5.27%	73	0.04%	1,017	0.53%	10,674	5.60%	6,196	3.25%	
Tempe	Arizona	180,587	97,651	54.07%	11,393	6.31%	4,357	2.41%	17,169	9.51%	688	0.38%	939	0.52%	8,692	4.81%	39,698	21.98%	
Newport News	Virginia	186,247	71,250	38.26%	76,870	41.27%	571	0.31%	6,230	3.35%	404	0.22%	1,124	0.60%	10,510	5.64%	19,288	10.36%	
Chattanooga	Tennessee	181,099	98,977	54.65%	52,384	28.93%	429	0.24%	4,956	2.74%	60	0.03%	691	0.38%	7,021	3.88%	16,581	9.16%	
Mobile	Alabama	187,041	75,043	40.12%	95,505	51.06%	513	0.27%	3,369	1.80%	106	0.06%	622	0.33%	5,849	3.13%	6,034	3.23%	
Fort Lauderdale	Florida	182,760	86,872	47.53%	49,560	27.12%	276	0.15%	3,511	1.92%	65	0.04%	1,224	0.67%	6,076	3.32%	35,176	19.25%	
Carson	California	95,558	6,569	6.87%	21,264	22.25%	185	0.19%	25,011	26.17%	1,585	1.66%	484	0.51%	2,817	2.95%	37,643	39.39%	
Cary	North Carolina	174,721	99,357	56.87%	13,506	7.73%	302	0.17%	39,035	22.34%	76	0.04%	969	0.55%	7,100	4.06%	14,376	8.23%	
Shreveport	Louisiana	187,593	66,138	35.26%	104,612	55.77%	573	0.31%	3,031	1.62%	102	0.05%	668	0.36%	5,811	3.10%	6,658	3.55%	
Ontario	California	175,265	23,997	13.69%	10,336	5.90%	409	0.23%	15,693	8.95%	415	0.24%	933	0.53%	3,554	2.03%	119,928	68.43%	
Eugene	Oregon	176,654	132,159	74.81%	2,935	1.66%	1,351	0.76%	7,083	4.01%	516	0.29%	1,157	0.65%	12,724	7.20%	18,729	10.60%	
Aurora	Illinois	180,542	61,017	33.80%	18,930	10.49%	207	0.11%	19,659	10.89%	61	0.03%	655	0.36%	5,032	2.79%	74,981	41.53%	
Elk Grove	California	176,124	51,218	29.08%	17,149	9.74%	521	0.30%	58,036	32.95%	2,446	1.39%	1,141	0.65%	12,221	6.94%	33,392	18.96%	
Salem	Oregon	175,535	111,430	63.48%	2,812	1.60%	1,776	1.01%	5,446	3.10%	2,293	1.31%	838	0.48%	9,638	5.49%	41,302	23.53%	
Santa Rosa	California	178,127	90,527	50.82%	3,802	2.13%	1,395	0.78%	10,659	5.98%	972	0.55%	965	0.54%	8,725	4.90%	61,082	34.29%	
Clarksville	Tennessee	166,722	89,596	53.74%	39,567	23.73%	582	0.35%	4,003	2.40%	812	0.49%	938	0.56%	11,553	6.93%	19,671	11.80%	
Rancho Cucamonga	California	174,453	59,931	34.35%	15,237	8.73%	357	0.20%	25,186	14.44%	387	0.22%	987	0.57%	7,107	4.07%	65,261	37.41%	
Oceanside	California	174,068	78,444	45.07%	6,456	3.71%	503	0.29%	12,759	7.33%	1,886	1.08%	1,030	0.59%	9,674	5.56%	63,316	36.37%	
Springfield	Missouri	169,176	134,294	79.38%	7,877	4.66%	1,074	0.63%	3,609	2.25%	276	0.16%	699	0.41%	11,221	6.63%	9,926	5.87%	
Pembroke Pines	Florida	171,178	36,313	21.21%	33,188	19.39%	205	0.12%	9,567	5.59%	60	0.04%	1,608	0.94%	5,104	2.98%	85,133	49.73%	
Garden Grove	California	171,949	28,172	16.38%	1,595	0.93%	220	0.13%	72,524	42.18%	759	0.44%	688	0.40%	3,889	2.26%	64,102	37.28%	
Fort Collins	Colorado	169,810	130,620	76.92%	2,292	1.35%	724	0.43%	6,038	3.56%	137	0.08%	833	0.49%	8,163	4.81%	21,003	12.37%	
Lancaster	California	173,516	42,321	24.39%	35,497	20.46%	704	0.41%	7,699	4.44%	250	0.14%	1,299	0.75%	7,408	4.27%	78,338	45.15%	
Palmdale	California	169,450	28,739	16.96%	22,000	12.98%	489	0.29%	7,007	4.14%	278	0.16%	1,112	0.66%	5,083	3.00%	104,742	61.81%	
Murfreesboro	Tennessee	152,769	94,941	62.15%	29,416	19.26%	398	0.26%	5,748	3.76%	90	0.06%	815	0.53%	7,443	4.87%	13,918	9.11%	
Salinas	California	163,542	18,351	11.22%	1,927	1.18%	428	0.26%	8,870	5.42%	342	0.21%	651	0.40%	2,795	1.71%	130,178	79.60%	
Killeen	Texas	153,095	36,955	24.14%	54,109	35.34%	577	0.38%	5,764	3.76%	2,533	1.65%	1,132	0.74%	10,600	6.92%	41,425	27.06%	
Hayward	California	162,954	21,436	13.15%	14,003	8.59%	346	0.21%	47,655	29.24%	4,915	3.02%	913	0.56%	6,607	4.05%	67,079	41.16%	
Paterson	New Jersey	159,732	12,523	7.84%	36,667	22.96%	186	0.12%	7,991	5.00%	17	0.01%	1,260	0.79%	2,225	1.39%	98,863	61.89%	
Macon	Georgia	157,346	56,787	36.09%	85,234	54.17%	281	0.18%	3,209	2.04%	42	0.03%	602	0.38%	4,454	2.83%	6,737	4.28%	Consolidated city-county with Bibb County
Lakewood	Colorado	155,984	103,355	66.26%	2,733	1.75%	1,106	0.71%	5,798	3.72%	212	0.14%	799	0.51%	6,558	4.20%	35,423	22.71%	
Alexandria	Virginia	159,467	78,519	49.24%	31,314	19.64%	217	0.14%	11,205	7.03%	77	0.05%	1,026	0.64%	7,737	4.85%	29,372	18.42%	
Roseville	California	147,773	90,347	61.14%	3,540	2.40%	520	0.35%	18,322	12.40%	475	0.32%	734	0.50%	9,778	6.62%	24,057	16.28%	
Surprise	Arizona	143,148	94,856	66.26%	7,404	5.17%	786	0.55%	3,771	2.63%	310	0.22%	591	0.41%	7,057	4.93%	28,373	19.82%	
Springfield	Massachusetts	155,929	44,046	28.25%	28,548	18.31%	259	0.17%	4,426	2.84%	75	0.05%	863	0.55%	4,838	3.10%	72,874	46.74%	
Charleston	South Carolina	150,227	108,766	72.40%	25,332	16.86%	278	0.19%	3,240	2.16%	154	0.10%	501	0.33%	5,138	3.42%	6,818	4.54%	
Kansas City	Kansas	156,607	53,962	34.46%	33,105	21.14%	619	0.40%	7,512	4.80%	347	0.22%	537	0.34%	6,381	4.07%	54,144	34.57%	
Sunnyvale	California	155,805	43,281	27.78%	2,134	1.37%	187	0.12%	77,552	49.78%	439	0.28%	839	0.54%	6,001	3.85%	25,372	16.28%	
Bellevue	Washington	151,854	66,063	43.50%	3,918	2.58%	255	0.17%	61,539	40.53%	254	0.17%	821	0.54%	7,933	5.22%	11,071	7.29%	
Hollywood	Florida	153,067	56,909	37.18%	25,194	16.46%	233	0.15%	3,958	2.59%	55	0.04%	1,353	0.88%	4,334	2.83%	61,031	39.87%	
Denton	Texas	139,869	76,532	54.72%	15,415	11.02%	624	0.45%	6,030	4.31%	152	0.11%	497	0.36%	6,166	4.41%	34,453	24.63%	
Escondido	California	151,038	50,693	33.56%	3,267	2.16%	479	0.32%	11,650	7.71%	325	0.22%	664	0.44%	5,734	3.80%	78,226	51.79%	
Joliet	Illinois	150,362	67,903	45.16%	23,814	15.84%	156	0.10%	2,927	1.95%	21	0.01%	464	0.31%	4,567	3.04%	50,510	33.59%	
Naperville	Illinois	149,540	92,603	61.93%	7,326	4.90%	104	0.07%	33,269	22.25%	44	0.03%	612	0.41%	5,208	3.48%	10,374	6.94%	
Bridgeport	Connecticut	148,654	24,404	16.42%	48,690	32.75%	228	0.15%	4,024	2.71%	31	0.02%	2,938	1.98%	5,486	3.69%	62,853	42.28%	
Savannah	Georgia	147,780	54,082	36.60%	71,845	48.62%	311	0.21%	5,610	3.80%	238	0.16%	692	0.47%	5,213	3.53%	9,789	6.62%	
Mesquite	Texas	150,108	37,797	25.18%	37,007	24.65%	452	0.30%	4,207	2.80%	67	0.04%	441	0.29%	3,865	2.57%	66,272	44.15%	
Pasadena	Texas	151,950	37,341	24.57%	4,992	3.29%	260	0.17%	3,346	2.20%	59	0.04%	466	0.31%	2,449	1.61%	103,037	67.81%	
Rockford	Illinois	148,655	72,440	48.73%	33,466	22.51%	308	0.21%	5,145	3.46%	30	0.02%	715	0.48%	6,968	4.69%	29,583	19.90%	
Pomona	California	151,713	15,669	10.33%	8,116	5.35%	386	0.25%	15,853	10.45%	235	0.15%	697	0.46%	2,713	1.79%	108,044	71.22%	
Jackson	Mississippi	153,701	25,424	16.54%	120,727	78.55%	237	0.15%	751	0.49%	30	0.02%	362	0.24%	2,951	1.92%	3,219	2.09%	
Olathe	Kansas	141,290	100,691	71.27%	8,262	5.85%	414	0.29%	6,293	4.45%	115	0.08%	620	0.44%	7,410	5.24%	17,485	12.38%	
Gainesville	Florida	141,085	74,737	52.97%	28,501	20.20%	237	0.17%	10,889	7.72%	47	0.03%	867	0.61%	6,362	4.51%	19,445	13.78%	
McAllen	Texas	142,210	13,032	9.16%	894	0.63%	141	0.10%	3,576	2.51%	21	0.01%	409	0.29%	887	0.62%	123,250	86.67%	
Syracuse	New York	148,620	68,206	45.89%	43,568	29.32%	1,170	0.79%	10,346	6.96%	57	0.04%	897	0.60%	8,751	5.89%	15,625	10.51%	
Waco	Texas	138,486	58,644	42.35%	26,844	19.38%	408	0.29%	3,525	2.55%	84	0.06%	704	0.51%	4,420	3.19%	43,857	31.67%	
Visalia	California	141,384	50,556	35.76%	2,398	1.70%	827	0.58%	7,655	5.41%	131	0.09%	672	0.48%	4,570	3.23%	74,575	52.75%	
Thornton	Colorado	141,867	72,316	50.97%	2,660	1.87%	748	0.53%	8,250	5.82%	130	0.09%	658	0.46%	5,713	4.03%	51,392	36.23%	
Torrance	California	147,067	51,913	35.30%	4,781	3.25%	235	0.16%	51,857	35.26%	523	0.36%	980	0.67%	8,698	5.91%	28,080	19.09%	
Fullerton	California	143,617	42,150	29.35%	2,972	2.07%	289	0.20%	37,913	26.40%	266	0.19%	691	0.48%	5,111	3.56%	54,225	37.76%	
Columbia	South Carolina	136,632	67,238	49.21%	52,038	38.09%	301	0.22%	4,152	3.04%	113	0.08%	409	0.30%	4,278	3.13%	8,103	5.93%	
Lakewood	New Jersey	135,158	111,388	82.41%	3,290	2.43%	91	0.07%	699	0.52%	7	0.01%	2,056	1.52%	1,859	1.38%	15,768	11.67%	
New Haven	Connecticut	134,023	37,010	27.61%	40,788	30.43%	339	0.25%	9,044	6.75%	61	0.05%	873	0.65%	4,840	3.61%	41,068	30.64%	
Hampton	Virginia	137,148	49,389	36.01%	66,632	48.58%	485	0.35%	3,493	2.55%	209	0.15%	895	0.65%	7,634	5.57%	8,411	6.13%	
Miramar	Florida	134,721	10,816	8.03%	55,386	41.11%	135	0.10%	7,708	5.72%	25	0.02%	1,381	1.03%	3,933	2.92%	55,337	41.08%	
Victorville	California	134,810	24,652	18.29%	22,917	17.00%	692	0.51%	5,262	3.90%	672	0.50%	935	0.69%	4,935	3.66%	74,745	55.44%	
Warren	Michigan	139,387	85,868	61.60%	28,179	20.22%	344	0.25%	14,303	10.26%	26	0.02%	629	0.45%	6,475	4.65%	3,563	2.56%	
West Valley City	Utah	140,230	61,004	43.50%	3,720	2.65%	1,231	0.88%	7,920	5.65%	6,334	4.52%	443	0.32%	4,300	3.07%	55,278	39.42%	
Cedar Rapids	Iowa	137,710	105,250	76.43%	14,153	10.28%	274	0.20%	3,747	2.72%	484	0.35%	404	0.29%	6,896	5.01%	6,502	4.72%	
Stamford	Connecticut	135,470	64,876	47.89%	16,201	11.96%	140	0.10%	11,453	8.45%	22	0.02%	1,018	0.75%	3,802	2.81%	37,958	28.02%	
Orange	California	139,911	55,330	39.55%	2,221	1.59%	289	0.21%	18,058	12.91%	328	0.23%	666	0.48%	5,444	3.89%	57,575	41.15%	
Dayton	Ohio	137,644	64,020	46.51%	55,620	40.41%	305	0.22%	1,922	1.40%	73	0.05%	837	0.61%	7,008	5.09%	7,859	5.71%	
Midland	Texas	132,524	59,453	44.86%	9,913	7.48%	546	0.41%	3,422	2.58%	127	0.10%	473	0.36%	3,429	2.59%	55,161	41.62%	
Kent	Washington	136,588	51,132	37.44%	17,058	12.49%	673	0.49%	32,021	23.44%	3,534	2.59%	805	0.59%	8,916	6.53%	22,449	16.44%	
Elizabeth	New Jersey	137,298	16,553	12.06%	22,261	16.21%	152	0.11%	2,757	2.01%	18	0.01%	2,145	1.56%	3,179	2.32%	90,233	65.72%	
Pasadena	California	138,699	50,858	36.67%	10,795	7.78%	201	0.14%	24,149	17.41%	130	0.09%	835	0.60%	5,989	4.32%	45,742	32.98%	
Carrollton	Texas	133,434	49,929	37.42%	13,136	9.84%	406	0.30%	22,367	16.76%	88	0.07%	530	0.40%	4,706	3.53%	42,272	31.68%	
Coral Springs	Florida	134,394	49,517	36.84%	30,197	22.47%	147	0.11%	7,440	5.54%	42	0.03%	1,846	1.37%	5,733	4.27%	39,472	29.37%	
Sterling Heights	Michigan	134,346	106,149	79.01%	8,709	6.48%	200	0.15%	10,935	8.14%	13	0.01%	337	0.25%	4,728	3.52%	3,275	2.44%	
Fargo	North Dakota	125,990	98,602	77.83%	10,882	8.64%	1,827	1.45%	5,150	4.09%	72	0.06%	330	0.26%	4,997	3.97%	4,670	3.71%	
Lewisville	Texas	111,822	40,675	36.37%	17,282	15.45%	345	0.31%	12,534	11.21%	69	0.06%	512	0.46%	4,552	4.07%	35,853	32.06%	
Meridian	Idaho	117,635	95,526	81.21%	1,086	0.92%	396	0.34%	2,938	2.50%	264	0.22%	513	0.44%	5,684	4.83%	11,228	9.54%	
Norman	Oklahoma	128,026	86,007	67.18%	6,176	4.82%	5,246	4.10%	5,028	3.93%	98	0.08%	1,263	0.99%	12,381	9.67%	11,827	9.24%	
Palm Bay	Florida	119,760	67,826	56.63%	20,426	17.06%	286	0.24%	2,273	1.90%	84	0.07%	902	0.75%	6,527	5.45%	21,436	17.90%	
Athens	Georgia	127,315	71,258	55.97%	31,129	24.45%	297	0.23%	4,894	3.84%	65	0.05%	976	0.77%	4,452	3.50%	14,244	11.19%	
Columbia	Missouri	126,254	89,814	71.14%	14,858	11.77%	273	0.22%	7,056	5.59%	87	0.07%	724	0.57%	7,247	5.74%	6,195	4.91%	
Abilene	Texas	125,182	70,391	56.23%	12,242	9.78%	496	0.40%	2,678	2.14%	141	0.11%	388	0.31%	5,212	4.16%	33,634	26.87%	
Pearland	Texas	125,828	46,138	36.67%	24,482	19.46%	246	0.20%	18,669	14.84%	64	0.05%	544	0.43%	4,560	3.62%	31,125	24.74%	
Santa Clara	California	127,647	35,930	28.15%	2,713	2.13%	186	0.15%	59,678	46.75%	390	0.31%	797	0.62%	5,403	4.23%	22,550	17.67%	
Round Rock	Texas	119,468	56,027	46.90%	11,552	9.67%	312	0.26%	9,668	8.09%	177	0.15%	714	0.60%	5,274	4.41%	35,744	29.92%	
Topeka	Kansas	126,587	81,243	64.18%	12,574	9.93%	1,169	0.92%	2,043	1.61%	135	0.11%	458	0.36%	8,216	6.49%	20,749	16.39%	
Allentown	Pennsylvania	125,845	38,033	30.22%	13,193	10.48%	150	0.12%	2,498	1.98%	28	0.02%	805	0.64%	2,906	2.31%	68,232	54.22%	
Clovis	California	120,124	57,916	48.21%	2,993	2.49%	738	0.61%	15,147	12.61%	270	0.22%	666	0.55%	5,800	4.83%	36,594	30.46%	
Simi Valley	California	126,356	68,251	54.01%	1,861	1.47%	302	0.24%	13,264	10.50%	177	0.14%	708	0.56%	5,872	4.65%	35,921	28.43%	
College Station	Texas	120,511	70,255	58.30%	9,479	7.87%	280	0.23%	12,224	10.14%	117	0.10%	475	0.39%	4,324	3.59%	23,357	19.38%	
Thousand Oaks	California	126,966	79,866	62.90%	1,707	1.34%	226	0.18%	12,517	9.86%	159	0.13%	768	0.60%	6,463	5.09%	25,260	19.90%	
Vallejo	California	126,090	26,440	20.97%	24,446	19.39%	431	0.34%	29,152	23.12%	1,255	1.00%	1,037	0.82%	7,494	5.94%	35,835	28.42%	
Concord	California	125,410	54,104	43.14%	4,532	3.61%	295	0.24%	18,435	14.70%	644	0.51%	884	0.70%	7,563	6.03%	38,953	31.06%	
Rochester	Minnesota	121,395	87,180	71.82%	10,661	8.78%	323	0.27%	9,469	7.80%	56	0.05%	429	0.35%	4,293	4.36%	7,984	6.58%	
Arvada	Colorado	124,402	94,989	76.36%	1,183	0.95%	550	0.44%	3,096	2.49%	72	0.06%	486	0.39%	5,390	4.33%	18,636	14.98%	
Lafayette	Louisiana	121,374	69,117	56.95%	37,025	30.50%	344	0.28%	3,136	2.58%	33	0.03%	457	0.38%	3,731	3.07%	7,531	6.20%	
Independence	Missouri	123,011	85,754	69.71%	10,345	8.41%	609	0.50%	1,444	1.17%	796	0.65%	507	0.41%	8,514	6.92%	15,042	12.23%	
West Palm Beach	Florida	117,415	44,921	38.26%	36,332	30.94%	163	0.14%	2,906	2.47%	32	0.03%	721	0.61%	3,441	2.93%	28,899	24.61%	
Hartford	Connecticut	121,054	15,278	12.62%	43,024	35.54%	262	0.22%	4,208	3.48%	34	0.03%	1,411	1.17%	3,522	2.91%	53,315	44.04%	
Wilmington	North Carolina	115,451	79,791	69.11%	18,828	16.31%	317	0.27%	1,826	1.58%	98	0.08%	554	0.48%	4,493	3.89%	9,544	8.27%	
Lakeland	Florida	112,641	61,372	54.48%	20,963	18.61%	258	0.23%	2,437	2.16%	55	0.05%	613	0.54%	4,241	3.77%	22,702	20.15%	
Billings	Montana	117,116	95,214	81.30%	1,039	0.89%	5,227	4.46%	1,057	0.90%	187	0.16%	421	0.36%	6,034	5.15%	7,937	6.78%	
Ann Arbor	Michigan	123,851	81,565	65.86%	8,236	6.65%	130	0.10%	19,372	15.64%	72	0.06%	807	0.65%	6,876	5.55%	6,793	5.48%	
Fairfield	California	119,881	33,265	27.75%	17,216	14.36%	384	0.32%	21,921	18.29%	1,201	1.00%	660	0.55%	8,511	7.10%	36,723	30.63%	
Berkeley	California	124,321	62,450	50.23%	9,495	7.64%	226	0.18%	24,701	19.87%	253	0.20%	1,109	0.89%	9,069	7.29%	17,018	13.69%	
Richardson	Texas	119,469	60,286	50.46%	12,615	10.56%	318	0.27%	20,412	17.09%	55	0.05%	535	0.45%	4,720	3.95%	20,528	17.18%	
North Charleston	South Carolina	114,852	43,506	37.88%	46,174	40.20%	355	0.31%	3,353	2.92%	138	0.12%	641	0.56%	4,615	4.02%	16,070	13.99%	
Cambridge	Massachusetts	118,403	65,553	55.36%	12,016	10.15%	154	0.13%	22,628	19.11%	49	0.04%	993	0.84%	6,272	5.30%	10,738	9.07%	
Broken Arrow	Oklahoma	113,540	72,706	64.04%	5,706	5.03%	5,894	5.19%	5,136	4.52%	69	0.06%	382	0.34%	12,009	10.58%	11,638	10.25%	
Clearwater	Florida	117,292	75,773	64.60%	11,806	10.07%	214	0.18%	3,355	2.86%	152	0.13%	609	0.52%	4,942	4.21%	20,441	17.43%	
West Jordan	Utah	116,961	77,760	66.48%	1,363	1.17%	596	0.51%	3,761	3.22%	2,450	2.09%	528	0.45%	4,455	3.81%	26,048	22.27%	
Evansville	Indiana	117,298	87,008	74.18%	15,834	13.50%	273	0.23%	1,438	1.23%	590	0.50%	558	0.48%	6,589	5.62%	5,008	4.27%	
League City	Texas	114,392	69,425	60.69%	8,317	7.27%	286	0.25%	7,122	6.23%	65	0.06%	602	0.53%	4,691	4.10%	23,884	20.88%	
Antioch	California	115,291	26,554	23.03%	23,721	20.18%	419	0.36%	14,570	12.64%	1,437	1.25%	825	0.72%	6,250	5.42%	41,965	36.40%	
Manchester	New Hampshire	115,644	85,608	74.03%	5,916	5.12%	229	0.20%	4,797	4.15%	27	0.02%	545	0.47%	4,865	4.21%	13,657	11.81%	
High Point	North Carolina	114,059	50,000	43.84%	36,124	31.67%	403	0.35%	9,985	8.75%	47	0.04%	805	0.71%	3,911	3.43%	12,784	11.21%	
Waterbury	Connecticut	114,403	37,760	33.01%	22,269	19.47%	307	0.27%	2,349	2.05%	32	0.03%	1,798	1.57%	4,607	4.03%	45,281	39.58%	
Carlsbad	California	114,746	79,201	69.02%	1,231	1.07%	259	0.23%	9,004	7.85%	196	0.17%	624	0.54%	6,929	6.04%	17,302	15.08%	
Las Cruces	New Mexico	111,385	35,672	32.03%	2,392	2.15%	983	0.88%	1,957	1.76%	76	0.07%	472	0.42%	2,629	2.36%	67,204	60.33%	
Murrieta	California	110,949	51,437	46.36%	6,244	5.63%	487	0.44%	11,158	10.06%	440	0.40%	625	0.56%	6,633	5.98%	33,925	30.58%	
Lowell	Massachusetts	115,554	46,908	40.59%	9,570	8.28%	111	0.10%	25,548	22.11%	56	0.05%	2,494	2.16%	5,816	5.03%	25,051	21.68%	
Provo	Utah	115,162	81,655	70.90%	971	0.84%	590	0.51%	2,772	2.41%	1,655	1.44%	406	0.35%	5,718	4.97%	21,395	18.58%	
Springfield	Illinois	114,394	77,775	67.99%	23,126	20.22%	191	0.17%	3,327	2.91%	42	0.04%	455	0.40%	5,896	5.15%	3,582	3.13%	
Elgin	Illinois	114,797	42,261	36.81%	7,207	6.28%	150	0.13%	7,285	6.35%	27	0.02%	392	0.34%	3,015	2.63%	54,460	47.44%	
Odessa	Texas	114,428	37,390	32.68%	7,007	6.12%	424	0.37%	2,452	2.14%	258	0.23%	357	0.31%	2,296	2.01%	64,244	56.14%	
Lansing	Michigan	112,644	57,838	51.35%	25,376	22.53%	504	0.45%	4,732	4.20%	32	0.03%	767	0.68%	7,928	7.04%	15,467	13.73%	
Pompano Beach	Florida	112,046	45,891	40.96%	31,395	28.02%	120	0.11%	1,793	1.60%	25	0.02%	1,443	1.29%	4,768	4.26%	26,611	23.75%	
Beaumont	Texas	115,282	54,034	28.23%	54,034	46.87%	209	0.18%	4,328	3.75%	29	0.03%	486	0.42%	3,040	2.64%	20,607	17.88%	
Temecula	California	110,003	54,222	49.29%	4,814	4.38%	804	0.73%	12,051	10.96%	389	0.35%	628	0.57%	6,729	6.12%	30,366	27.60%	
Gresham	Oregon	114,247	68,097	59.61%	5,665	4.96%	878	0.77%	6,791	5.94%	1,213	1.06%	559	0.49%	7,001	6.13%	24,043	21.04%	
Allen	Texas	104,627	53,330	50.97%	10,058	9.61%	344	0.33%	22,348	21.36%	54	0.05%	442	0.42%	4,854	4.64%	13,197	12.61%	
Pueblo	Colorado	111,876	48,001	42.91%	2,492	2.23%	923	0.83%	1,065	0.95%	107	0.10%	647	0.58%	3,508	3.14%	55,133	49.28%	
Everett	Washington	110,629	64,791	58.57%	5,716	5.17%	925	0.84%	10,485	9.48%	1,439	1.30%	591	0.53%	7,599	6.87%	19,083	17.25%	
South Fulton	Georgia	107,436	3,402	3.17%	96,463	89.79%	148	0.14%	459	0.43%	33	0.03%	729	0.68%	2,674	2.49%	3,528	3.28%	
Peoria	Illinois	113,150	60,364	53.35%	31,213	27.59%	229	0.20%	7,184	6.35%	42	0.04%	586	0.52%	5,633	4.98%	7,899	6.98%	
Nampa	Idaho	100,200	67,229	67.09%	810	0.81%	506	0.50%	1,031	1.03%	426	0.43%	475	0.47%	4,394	4.39%	25,329	25.28%	
Tuscaloosa	Alabama	99,600	47,663	47.85%	40,867	41.03%	147	0.15%	2,352	2.36%	47	0.05%	454	0.46%	2,632	2.64%	5,438	5.46%	
Miami Gardens	Florida	111,640	2,742	2.46%	69,071	61.87%	94	0.08%	722	0.65%	11	0.01%	646	0.58%	1,643	1.47%	36,711	32.88%	
Santa Maria	California	109,707	16,758	15.28%	1,043	0.95%	322	0.29%	4,999	4.56%	96	0.09%	504	0.46%	2,017	1.84%	83,968	76.54%	
Downey	California	114,355	14,378	12.57%	3,930	3.44%	251	0.22%	7,311	6.39%	249	0.22%	691	0.60%	1,679	1.47%	85,866	75.09%	
Concord	North Carolina	105,240	55,333	52.58%	22,986	21.84%	236	0.22%	7,050	6.70%	61	0.06%	569	0.54%	4,368	4.15%	14,637	13.91%	
Ventura	California	110,763	59,425	53.65%	1,743	1.57%	399	0.36%	4,267	3.85%	163	0.15%	661	0.60%	5,203	4.70%	38,902	35.12%	
Costa Mesa	California	111,918	54,169	48.40%	1,306	1.17%	232	0.21%	9,455	8.45%	412	0.37%	618	0.55%	4,931	4.41%	40,795	36.45%	
Sugar Land	Texas	111,026	42,305	38.10%	7,969	7.18%	150	0.14%	42,639	38.40%	30	0.03%	578	0.52%	3,925	3.54%	13,430	12.10%	
Menifee	California	102,527	44,973	43.86%	6,482	6.32%	390	0.38%	6,292	6.14%	438	0.43%	548	0.53%	4,655	4.54%	38,749	37.79%	
Tyler	Texas	105,995	50,785	47.91%	24,126	22.76%	254	0.24%	2,988	2.82%	39	0.04%	352	0.33%	3,428	3.23%	24,023	22.66%	
Sparks	Nevada	108,445	57,792	53.29%	3,083	2.84%	884	0.82%	7,138	6.58%	960	0.89%	454	0.42%	5,464	5.04%	32,670	30.13%	
Greeley	Colorado	108,795	55,803	51.29%	2,725	2.50%	528	0.49%	2,075	1.91%	111	0.10%	414	0.38%	3,381	3.11%	43,758	40.22%	
Rio Rancho	New Mexico	104,046	48,168	46.29%	2,559	2.46%	3,353	3.22%	2,011	1.93%	140	0.13%	499	0.48%	3,982	3.83%	43,334	41.65%	
Sandy Springs	Georgia	108,080	58,130	53.78%	19,773	18.29%	137	0.13%	10,160	9.40%	56	0.05%	806	0.75%	4,278	3.96%	14,740	13.64%	
Dearborn	Michigan	109,976	93,884	85.37%	4,346	3.95%	107	0.10%	2,783	2.53%	16	0.01%	549	0.50%	4,351	3.96%	3,940	3.58%	
Jurupa Valley	California	105,053	19,187	18.26%	3,529	3.36%	240	0.23%	5,281	5.03%	237	0.23%	534	0.51%	1,998	1.90%	74,407	70.49%	
Edison	New Jersey	107,588	28,304	26.31%	7,764	7.22%	219	0.20%	57,687	53.62%	27	0.03%	629	0.58%	2,187	2.03%	10,771	10.01%	
Spokane Valley	Washington	102,976	83,459	81.05%	1,733	1.68%	1,055	1.02%	1,912	1.86%	689	0.67%	485	0.47%	6,390	6.21%	7,253	7.04%	
Hillsboro	Oregon	106,447	56,716	53.28%	2,950	2.77%	461	0.43%	13,293	12.49%	514	0.48%	588	0.55%	6,307	5.93%	25,618	24.07%	
Davie	Florida	105,691	44,036	41.66%	8,673	8.21%	174	0.16%	6,338	6.00%	65	0.06%	859	0.81%	3,777	3.57%	41,769	39.52%	
Green Bay	Wisconsin	107,395	68,646	63.92%	5,743	5.35%	3,782	3.52%	4,688	4.37%	58	0.05%	299	0.28%	4,959	4.62%	19,220	17.90%	
Centennial	Colorado	108,418	81,391	75.07%	3,545	3.27%	266	0.25%	6,794	6.27%	109	0.10%	508	0.47%	5,387	4.97%	10,418	9.61%	
Yuma	Arizona	95,548	29,815	31.20%	2,069	2.17%	843	0.88%	1,786	1.87%	135	0.14%	362	0.38%	2,318	2.43%	58,220	60.93%	
Buckeye	Arizona	91,502	43,071	47.07%	6,187	6.76%	947	1.03%	1,435	1.57%	234	0.26%	484	0.53%	3,507	3.83%	35,637	38.95%	
Boulder	Colorado	108,250	82,700	76.40%	1,305	1.21%	394	0.36%	6,934	6.41%	122	0.11%	582	0.54%	4,773	4.41%	11,440	10.57%	
Goodyear	Arizona	95,294	49,748	52.20%	6,876	7.22%	860	0.90%	3,763	3.95%	246	0.26%	474	0.50%	4,027	4.23%	29,300	30.75%	
El Monte	California	109,450	3,667	3.35%	745	0.68%	146	0.13%	32,940	30.10%	34	0.03%	356	0.33%	743	0.68%	70,819	64.70%	
West Covina	California	109,501	11,793	10.77%	3,713	3.39%	217	0.20%	33,097	30.23%	149	0.14%	541	0.49%	1,889	1.73%	58,102	53.06%	
Brockton	Massachusetts	105,643	29,392	27.82%	35,656	33.75%	232	0.22%	2,243	2.12%	28	0.03%	7,315	6.92%	18,015	17.05%	12,762	12.08%	
New Braunfels	Texas	90,403	51,801	57.30%	2,371	2.62%	233	0.26%	1,261	1.39%	131	0.14%	334	0.37%	3,007	3.33%	31,265	34.58%	
El Cajon	California	106,215	56,116	52.83%	6,664	6.27%	328	0.31%	5,006	4.71%	418	0.39%	613	0.58%	5,799	5.46%	31,271	29.44%	
Edinburg	Texas	100,243	6,793	6.78%	1,389	1.39%	110	0.11%	2,563	2.56%	3	0.00%	250	0.25%	477	0.48%	88,658	88.44%	
Renton	Washington	106,785	42,449	39.75%	10,585	9.91%	463	0.43%	27,721	25.96%	818	0.77%	637	0.60%	7,602	7.12%	16,510	15.46%	
Burbank	California	107,337	60,350	56.22%	2,891	2.69%	222	0.21%	12,282	11.44%	98	0.09%	618	0.58%	4,915	4.58%	25,961	24.19%	
Inglewood	California	107,762	4,398	4.08%	40,804	37.86%	199	0.18%	2,107	1.96%	331	0.31%	855	0.79%	3,391	3.15%	55,677	51.67%	
Rialto	California	104,026	9,568	9.20%	11,722	11.27%	298	0.29%	2,457	2.36%	320	0.31%	490	0.47%	1,826	1.76%	77,345	74.35%	
Lee's Summit	Missouri	101,108	78,003	77.15%	8,886	8.79%	232	0.23%	2,372	2.35%	142	0.14%	379	0.37%	5,696	5.63%	5,398	5.34%	
Bend	Oregon	99,178	81,355	82.03%	445	0.45%	466	0.47%	1,602	1.62%	141	0.14%	548	0.55%	5,521	5.57%	9,100	9.18%	
Woodbridge	New Jersey	103,639	40,272	38.86%	10,143	9.79%	165	0.16%	27,425	26.46%	24	0.02%	757	0.73%	2,574	2.48%	22,279	21.50%	
South Bend	Indiana	103,453	51,891	50.16%	26,102	25.23%	300	0.29%	1,549	1.50%	57	0.06%	651	0.63%	5,654	5.47%	17,249	16.67%	
Wichita Falls	Texas	102,316	57,750	56.44%	12,838	12.55%	737	0.72%	2,464	2.41%	124	0.12%	409	0.40%	4,813	4.70%	23,181	22.66%	
St. George	Utah	95,342	74,860	78.52%	634	0.66%	956	1.00%	1,127	1.18%	1,088	1.14%	328	0.34%	3,257	3.42%	13,092	13.73%	
Fishers	Indiana	98,977	74,625	75.40%	6,556	6.62%	140	0.14%	7,897	7.98%	30	0.03%	473	0.48%	4,244	4.29%	5,012	5.06%	
Carmel	Indiana	99,757	75,534	75.72%	3,256	3.26%	65	0.07%	11,966	12.00%	20	0.02%	451	0.45%	3,944	3.95%	4,521	4.53%	
Vacaville	California	102,386	47,338	46.23%	9,386	9.17%	395	0.39%	8,800	8.59%	663	0.65%	665	0.65%	7,737	7.56%	27,402	26.76%	
Quincy	Massachusetts	101,636	55,055	54.17%	5,449	5.36%	117	0.12%	31,196	30.69%	16	0.02%	1,011	0.99%	3,578	3.52%	5,214	5.13%	
Conroe	Texas	89,956	45,272	50.33%	8,951	9.95%	299	0.33%	2,412	2.68%	85	0.09%	348	0.39%	3,112	3.46%	29,477	32.77%	
Chico	California	101,475	66,361	65.40%	1,822	1.80%	938	0.92%	4,349	4.29%	320	0.32%	624	0.61%	6,423	6.33%	20,638	20.34%	
San Mateo	California	105,661	40,519	38.35%	1,696	1.61%	177	0.17%	27,786	26.30%	1,634	1.55%	914	0.87%	5,737	5.43%	27,198	25.74%	
Lynn	Massachusetts	101,253	34,536	34.11%	10,735	10.60%	115	0.11%	6,822	6.74%	28	0.03%	1,077	1.06%	3,380	3.34%	44,560	44.01%	
Albany	New York	99,224	44,392	44.74%	29,222	29.45%	241	0.24%	7,949	8.01%	66	0.07%	871	0.88%	4,942	4.98%	11,541	11.63%	
Hesperia	California	99,818	29,444	29.50%	5,255	5.26%	427	0.43%	2,193	2.20%	205	0.21%	565	0.57%	3,081	3.09%	58,648	58.75%	
New Bedford	Massachusetts	101,079	57,498	56.88%	4,787	4.74%	265	0.26%	1,010	1.00%	32	0.03%	3,688	3.65%	9,274	9.18%	24,525	24.26%	
Davenport	Iowa	101,724	72,246	71.02%	11,833	11.63%	223	0.22%	2,224	2.19%	35	0.03%	292	0.29%	5,890	5.79%	8,981	8.83%	
Hoover	Alabama	92,606	62,841	67.86%	15,513	16.75%	114	0.12%	5,913	6.39%	17	0.02%	333	0.36%	3,171	3.42%	4,704	5.08%	
Daly City	California	104,901	12,207	11.64%	2,360	2.25%	112	0.11%	59,722	56.93%	705	0.67%	925	0.88%	3,633	3.46%	25,327	24.06%	
Fort Smith	Arkansas	89,142	50,728	56.91%	7,602	8.53%	1,555	1.74%	5,103	5.72%	65	0.07%	227	0.25%	6,396	7.18%	17,466	19.59%	
Springdale	Arkansas	84,161	34,543	41.04%	1,733	2.06%	544	0.65%	1,791	2.13%	8,662	10.29%	193	0.23%	3,408	4.05%	33,287	39.55%	
Fayetteville	Arkansas	93,949	69,228	73.69%	5,956	6.34%	872	0.93%	2,987	3.18%	469	0.50%	348	0.37%	6,007	6.39%	8,082	8.60%	
Alhambra	California	82,868	6,942	8.38%	1,345	1.62%	137	0.17%	42,552	51.35%	70	0.08%	306	0.37%	1,606	1.94%	29,910	36.09%	
Compton	California	95,740	856	0.89%	24,342	25.43%	132	0.14%	365	0.38%	544	0.57%	440	0.46%	1,270	1.33%	67,791	70.81%	Compton lost its Black majority in the 2000 census
Hawthorne	California	88,083	9,147	10.38%	20,763	23.57%	128	0.15%	6,552	7.44%	683	0.78%	773	0.88%	2,727	3.10%	47,310	53.71%	
Norwalk	California	102,773	8,919	8.68%	3,849	3.75%	294	0.29%	13,680	13.31%	370	0.36%	486	0.47%	1,627	1.58%	73,548	71.56%	
Santa Monica	California	93,076	60,654	65.17%	3,623	3.89%	129	0.14%	8,466	9.10%	109	0.12%	805	0.86%	5,746	6.17%	13,544	14.55%	
South Gate	California	92,726	2,285	2.46%	884	0.95%	119	0.13%	609	0.66%	31	0.03%	338	0.36%	420	0.45%	88,040	94.95%	
Whittier	California	87,306	18,018	20.64%	1,014	1.16%	248	0.28%	3,967	4.54%	122	0.14%	440	0.50%	1,694	1.94%	61,803	70.79%	
Buena Park	California	84,304	16,331	19.43%	2,504	2.98%	174	0.21%	27,499	32.72%	373	0.44%	345	0.41%	2,478	2.95%	34,330	40.85%	
Lake Forest	California	85,858	40,506	47.18%	1,312	1.53%	153	0.18%	16,650	19.39%	144	0.17%	450	0.52%	4,698	5.47%	21,945	25.56%	
Mission Viejo	California	93,653	57,790	61.71%	1,134	1.21%	117	0.12%	10,822	11.56%	152	0.16%	454	0.48%	5,198	5.55%	17,986	19.20%	
Newport Beach	California	85,239	64,352	75.50%	626	0.73%	100	0.12%	7,443	8.73%	81	0.10%	417	0.49%	4,030	4.73%	8,190	9.61%	
Tustin	California	80,276	22,901	28.53%	1,619	2.02%	95	0.12%	19,043	23.72%	193	0.24%	418	0.52%	3,295	4.10%	32,712	40.75%	
Westminster	California	90,911	17,962	19.76%	853	0.94%	146	0.16%	46,513	51.16%	415	0.46%	250	0.27%	2,427	2.67%	22,345	24.58%	
Milpitas	California	80,273	7,795	9.71%	1,577	1.96%	100	0.12%	57,260	71.33%	319	0.40%	332	0.41%	2,304	2.87%	10,586	13.19%	
Folsom	California	80,454	44,972	55.90%	3,342	4.15%	269	0.33%	15,742	19.57%	185	0.23%	494	0.61%	4,947	6.15%	10,503	13.05%	
Mountain View	California	82,376	33,008	40.07%	1,155	1.40%	101	0.12%	28,760	34.91%	215	0.26%	557	0.68%	4,374	5.31%	14,206	17.25%	
Lakewood	California	82,496	25,882	31.37%	6,530	7.92%	215	0.26%	15,137	18.35%	645	0.78%	448	0.54%	4,157	5.04%	29,482	35.74%	
Manteca	California	83,498	28,900	34.61%	3,477	4.16%	431	0.52%	11,627	13.92%	587	0.70%	546	0.65%	4,038	4.84%	33,892	40.59%	
Santa Fe	New Mexico	87,505	36,252	41.43%	830	0.95%	1,287	1.47%	1,589	1.82%	33	0.04%	554	0.63%	2,318	2.65%	44,642	51.02%	
Redwood City	California	84,292	34,067	40.42%	1,376	1.63%	129	0.15%	13,522	16.04%	618	0.73%	502	0.60%	3,974	4.71%	30,104	35.71%	
San Ramon	California	84,605	27,140	32.08%	2,113	2.50%	100	0.12%	43,052	50.89%	174	0.21%	427	0.50%	4,497	5.32%	7,102	8.39%	
Merced	California	86,333	20,386	23.61%	4,191	4.85%	393	0.46%	9,234	10.70%	158	0.18%	444	0.51%	2,910	3.37%	48,617	56.32%	
Citrus Heights	California	87,853	56,474	64.48%	3,191	3.64%	516	0.59%	3,507	4.00%	403	0.46%	510	0.58%	5,806	6.63%	17,176	19.61%	
Livermore	California	87,955	48,449	55.08%	1,604	1.82%	203	0.23%	12,633	14.36%	209	0.24%	500	0.57%	5,379	6.12%	18,978	21.58%	
Santa Barbara	California	88,665	45,882	51.75%	1,086	1.22%	275	0.31%	3,047	3.44%	61	0.07%	569	0.64%	3,401	3.84%	34,344	38.73%	
Indio	California	89,137	21,474	24.09%	1,802	2.02%	284	0.32%	1,988	2.23%	48	0.05%	357	0.40%	1,578	1.77%	61,606	69.11%	
Hemet	California	89,833	33,051	36.79%	8,285	9.22%	537	0.60%	2,914	3.24%	345	0.38%	423	0.47%	3,482	3.88%	40,796	45.41%	
San Leandro	California	91,008	17,865	19.63%	9,708	10.67%	224	0.25%	32,365	35.56%	712	0.78%	440	0.48%	3,713	4.08%	25,981	28.55%	
Chino	California	91,403	18,833	20.60%	5,212	5.70%	256	0.28%	17,255	18.88%	102	0.11%	466	0.51%	2,438	2.67%	46,841	51.25%	
Tracy	California	93,000	25,117	27.01%	5,737	6.17%	310	0.33%	19,339	20.79%	897	0.96%	634	0.68%	4,969	5.34%	35,997	38.71%	
Redding	California	93,611	68,751	73.44%	1,299	1.39%	1,747	1.87%	4,086	4.36%	180	0.19%	518	0.55%	6,540	6.99%	10,490	11.21%	
San Marcos	California	94,833	41,989	44.28%	1,898	2.00%	189	0.20%	10,185	10.74%	253	0.27%	525	0.55%	4,916	5.18%	34,878	36.78%	
Vista	California	98,381	35,518	36.10%	2,410	2.45%	273	0.28%	4,984	5.07%	612	0.62%	523	0.53%	4,317	4.39%	49,744	50.56%	
Corona	California	157,136	49,860	31.73%	8,136	5.18%	461	0.29%	18,482	11.76%	509	0.32%	822	0.52%	5,764	3.67%	73,102	46.52%	
Kenosha	Wisconsin	99,986	62,835	62.84%	10,279	10.28%	224	0.22%	1,843	1.84%	49	0.05%	318	0.32%	4,788	4.79%	19,650	19.65%	
Avondale	Arizona	89,334	23,127	25.89%	8,272	9.26%	991	1.11%	3,445	3.86%	339	0.38%	550	0.62%	2,932	3.28%	49,678	55.61%	
Richmond	Virginia	226,610	95,220	42.02%	90,490	39.93%	440	0.19%	6,199	2.74%	69	0.03%	1,378	0.61%	9,067	4.00%	23,747	10.48%	
Westminster	Colorado	116,317	74,502	64.05%	1,805	1.55%	576	0.50%	6,372	5.48%	80	0.07%	503	0.43%	5,241	4.51%	27,238	23.42%	
Carolina	Puerto Rico	154,815	1,536	0.99%	313	0.20%	10	0.01%	272	0.18%	11	0.01%	138	0.09%	118	0.08%	152,417	98.45%	
San Juan	Puerto Rico	342,259	4,882	1.43%	1,071	0.31%	58	0.02%	796	0.23%	7	0.00%	340	0.10%	504	0.15%	334,601	97.76%	
Ponce	Puerto Rico	137,491	799	0.58%	115	0.08%	14	0.01%	107	0.08%	1	0.00%	76	0.06%	79	0.06%	136,300	99.13%	
Bayamón	Puerto Rico	185,187	1,232	0.67%	225	0.12%	22	0.01%	176	0.10%	4	0.00%	140	0.08%	125	0.07%	183,263	98.96%	
Champaign	Illinois	88,302	45,409	51.42%	15,625	17.96%	99	0.11%	14,705	16.65%	27	0.03%	431	0.49%	4,289	4.86%	7,717	8.74%	
Waukegan	Illinois	89,321	14,003	15.68%	14,647	16.40%	129	0.14%	4,576	5.12%	35	0.04%	817	0.91%	2,011	2.25%	53,103	59.45%	
Cicero	Illinois	85,268	5,332	6.25%	2,870	3.37%	71	0.08%	456	0.53%	14	0.02%	162	0.19%	473	0.55%	75,890	89.00%	
Suffolk	Virginia	94,324	43,837	46.47%	39,194	41.55%	255	0.27%	1,672	1.77%	68	0.07%	543	0.58%	4,503	4.77%	4,252	4.51%	
Roanoke	Virginia	100,011	55,951	55.94%	27,077	27.07%	211	0.21%	2,462	2.46%	42	0.04%	523	0.52%	5,261	5.26%	8,484	8.48%	
Portsmouth	Virginia	97,915	34,912	35.66%	51,586	52.68%	355	0.36%	1,244	1.27%	134	0.14%	490	0.50%	4,781	4.88%	4,413	4.51%	
Toms River	New Jersey	95,438	73,671	77.19%	3,155	3.31%	65	0.07%	3,780	3.96%	11	0.01%	445	0.47%	2,718	2.85%	11,593	12.15%	
Hamilton	New Jersey	92,297	55,199	59.81%	11,724	12.70%	67	0.07%	4,121	4.46%	14	0.02%	348	0.38%	2,545	2.76%	18,279	19.80%	
Trenton	New Jersey	90,871	8,510	9.36%	38,386	42.24%	144	0.16%	592	0.65%	24	0.03%	440	0.48%	1,870	2.06%	40,905	45.01%	
Clifton	New Jersey	90,296	39,250	43.47%	3,899	4.32%	89	0.10%	8,414	9.32%	14	0.02%	607	0.67%	1,864	2.06%	36,159	40.04%	
Guaynabo	Puerto Rico	89,780	1,226	1.37%	286	0.32%	9	0.01%	165	0.18%	5	0.01%	89	0.10%	106	0.12%	87,894	97.90%	
Arecibo	Puerto Rico	87,754	455	0.52%	62	0.07%	0	0.00%	45	0.05%	0	0.00%	49	0.06%	26	0.03%	87,117	99.27%	
Caguas	Puerto Rico	127,244	562	0.44%	99	0.08%	11	0.01%	86	0.07%	6	0.00%	123	0.10%	87	0.07%	126,270	99.23%	
Asheville	North Carolina	94,589	70,252	74.27%	9,752	10.31%	200	0.21%	1,504	1.59%	255	0.27%	654	0.69%	4,315	4.56%	7,657	8.10%	
Greenville	North Carolina	87,521	40,054	45.77%	35,833	40.94%	256	0.29%	2,401	2.74%	50	0.06%	494	0.56%	3,357	3.84%	5,076	5.80%	
Gastonia	North Carolina	80,411	40,855	50.81%	24,334	30.26%	216	0.27%	1,389	1.73%	17	0.02%	329	0.41%	3,100	3.86%	10,171	12.65%	
Lake Charles	Louisiana	84,872	35,143	41.41%	38,943	45.88%	289	0.34%	2,230	2.63%	82	0.10%	460	0.54%	2,953	3.48%	4,772	5.62%	
Nashua	New Hampshire	91,322	64,225	70.30%	2,383	2.61%	130	0.14%	7,112	7.79%	29	0.03%	817	0.89%	3,939	4.31%	12,687	13.89%	
Roswell	Georgia	92,833	58,745	63.28%	10,694	11.52%	87	0.09%	4,626	4.98%	31	0.03%	707	0.76%	3,853	4.15%	14,090	15.18%	
Johns Creek	Georgia	82,453	39,483	47.89%	8,528	10.34%	73	0.09%	24,603	29.84%	38	0.05%	524	0.64%	3,414	4.14%	5,790	7.02%	
Warner Robins	Georgia	80,308	33,491	41.70%	32,936	41.01%	160	0.20%	2,949	3.67%	54	0.07%	375	0.47%	3,836	4.78%	6,507	8.10%	
Brooklyn Park	Minnesota	86,478	33,584	38.84%	25,228	29.17%	351	0.41%	16,261	18.80%	14	0.02%	403	0.47%	4,048	4.68%	6,589	7.62%	
Duluth	Minnesota	86,697	72,984	84.18%	3,001	3.46%	2,077	2.40%	1,381	1.59%	34	0.04%	293	0.34%	4,869	5.62%	2,058	2.37%	
Bloomington	Minnesota	89,987	61,243	68.06%	8,823	9.81%	448	0.50%	5,910	6.57%	45	0.05%	479	0.53%	3,879	4.31%	8,872	9.86%	
Parma	Ohio	81,146	66,785	82.30%	3,271	4.03%	140	0.17%	2,027	2.50%	8	0.01%	257	0.32%	3,094	3.81%	5,564	6.86%	
Clinton	Michigan	100,513	72,926	72.55%	17,428	17.34%	192	0.19%	2,170	2.16%	19	0.02%	335	0.33%	4,449	4.43%	2,994	2.98%	
Canton	Michigan	98,659	60,325	61.14%	10,549	10.69%	170	0.17%	19,148	19.41%	11	0.01%	423	0.43%	4,284	4.34%	3,749	3.80%	
Livonia	Michigan	95,535	80,242	83.99%	4,488	4.70%	189	0.20%	3,011	3.15%	9	0.01%	322	0.34%	3,791	3.97%	3,483	3.65%	
Macomb	Michigan	91,663	77,042	84.05%	4,627	5.05%	99	0.11%	3,198	3.49%	19	0.02%	216	0.24%	3,603	3.93%	2,859	3.12%	
Troy	Michigan	87,294	53,793	61.62%	3,422	3.92%	108	0.12%	23,788	27.25%	9	0.01%	312	0.36%	2,908	3.33%	2,954	3.38%	
Westland	Michigan	85,420	54,273	63.54%	18,504	21.66%	304	0.36%	3,682	4.31%	12	0.01%	361	0.42%	4,424	5.18%	3,860	4.52%	
Farmington Hills	Michigan	83,986	49,603	59.06%	15,268	18.18%	110	0.13%	12,867	15.32%	20	0.02%	374	0.45%	3,104	3.70%	2,640	3.14%	
Flint	Michigan	81,252	26,372	32.46%	45,293	55.74%	302	0.37%	404	0.50%	25	0.03%	424	0.52%	4,476	5.51%	3,956	4.87%	
O'Fallon	Missouri	91,316	74,340	81.41%	4,568	5.00%	140	0.15%	3,688	4.04%	79	0.09%	276	0.30%	4,586	5.02%	3,639	3.99%	
Lawton	Oklahoma	90,381	43,483	48.11%	17,554	19.42%	3,958	4.38%	2,645	2.93%	707	0.78%	371	0.41%	7,878	8.72%	13,785	15.25%	
Reading	Pennsylvania	95,112	17,999	18.92%	8,125	8.54%	123	0.13%	726	0.76%	15	0.02%	503	0.53%	2,030	2.13%	65,591	68.96%	
Erie	Pennsylvania	94,831	60,541	63.84%	16,419	17.31%	145	0.15%	3,548	3.74%	38	0.04%	592	0.62%	5,442	5.74%	8,106	8.55%	
Upper Darby	Pennsylvania	85,681	33,961	39.64%	30,291	35.35%	125	0.15%	10,878	12.70%	24	0.03%	556	0.65%	3,108	3.63%	6,738	7.86%	
San Angelo	Texas	99,893	48,114	48.17%	3,846	3.85%	293	0.29%	1,639	1.64%	135	0.14%	314	0.31%	3,243	3.25%	42,039	42.35%	
Temple	Texas	82,073	41,976	51.14%	12,031	14.66%	281	0.34%	2,090	2.55%	158	0.19%	354	0.43%	3,660	4.46%	21,523	26.22%	
Bryan	Texas	83,980	33,220	39.56%	12,876	15.33%	117	0.14%	2,028	2.41%	83	0.10%	379	0.45%	2,453	2.92%	32,824	39.09%	
Mission	Texas	85,778	7,625	8.89%	349	0.41%	51	0.06%	1,232	1.44%	15	0.02%	190	0.22%	360	0.42%	75,956	88.55%	
Baytown	Texas	83,701	24,137	28.84%	13,652	16.32%	233	0.28%	1,447	1.73%	42	0.05%	526	0.63%	2,250	2.69%	41,414	49.48%	
Longview	Texas	81,638	40,599	49.73%	19,173	23.49%	255	0.31%	1,309	1.60%	30	0.04%	219	0.27%	3,115	3.82%	16,938	20.75%	
Franklin	Tennessee	83,454	62,607	75.02%	4,304	5.16%	130	0.16%	6,395	7.66%	49	0.06%	407	0.49%	2,874	3.44%	6,688	8.01%	
Sioux City	Iowa	85,797	53,964	62.90%	4,931	5.75%	1,771	2.06%	2,755	3.21%	631	0.74%	333	0.39%	3,451	4.02%	17,961	20.93%	
Mount Pleasant	South Carolina	90,801	79,476	87.53%	2,984	3.29%	117	0.13%	2,012	2.22%	27	0.03%	249	0.27%	2,701	2.97%	3,235	3.56%	
Federal Way	Washington	101,030	38,897	38.50%	14,177	14.03%	582	0.58%	15,469	15.31%	4,031	3.99%	570	0.56%	7,038	6.97%	20,266	20.06%	
Yakima	Washington	96,968	42,212	43.53%	1,184	1.22%	1,321	1.36%	1,342	1.38%	126	0.13%	414	0.43%	3,377	3.48%	46,992	48.46%	
Kirkland	Washington	92,175	58,847	63.84%	1,842	2.00%	252	0.27%	16,387	17.78%	164	0.18%	926	1.00%	6,473	7.02%	7,284	7.90%	
Bellingham	Washington	91,482	68,442	74.81%	1,253	1.37%	812	0.89%	5,425	5.93%	280	0.31%	537	0.59%	6,257	6.84%	8,476	9.27%	
Auburn	Washington	87,256	42,367	48.55%	6,576	7.54%	1,492	1.71%	11,312	12.96%	2,719	3.12%	469	0.54%	6,096	6.99%	16,225	18.59%	
Kennewick	Washington	83,291	49,699	59.22%	1,450	1.73%	488	0.58%	2,308	2.75%	336	0.40%	391	0.47%	3,942	4.70%	25,307	30.16%	
Beaverton	Oregon	97,494	57,537	59.02%	2,669	2.74%	334	0.34%	11,724	12.03%	503	0.52%	518	0.53%	6,532	6.70%	17,677	18.13%	
Medford	Oregon	85,824	61,433	71.58%	805	0.94%	687	0.80%	1,728	2.01%	487	0.57%	444	0.52%	5,554	6.47%	14,686	17.11%	
Orem	Utah	98,129	68,948	70.26%	866	0.88%	485	0.49%	1,968	2.01%	1,409	1.44%	469	0.48%	4,130	4.21%	19,854	20.23%	
Sandy	Utah	96,904	76,172	78.61%	866	0.89%	376	0.39%	4,020	4.15%	659	0.68%	463	0.48%	3,925	4.05%	10,423	10.76%	
Ogden	Utah	87,321	52,743	60.40%	1,759	2.01%	696	0.80%	1,197	1.37%	331	0.38%	404	0.46%	3,293	3.77%	26,898	30.80%	
Layton	Utah	81,773	62,699	76.67%	1,126	1.38%	421	0.51%	1,796	2.20%	526	0.64%	345	0.42%	3,533	4.32%	11,327	13.85%	
Fall River	Massachusetts	94,000	66,746	71.01%	4,643	4.94%	185	0.20%	2,475	2.63%	17	0.02%	1,370	1.46%	5,982	6.36%	12,582	13.39%	
Lawrence	Massachusetts	89,143	10,984	12.32%	2,088	2.34%	96	0.11%	1,547	1.74%	9	0.01%	660	0.74%	857	0.96%	72,902	81.78%	
Newton	Massachusetts	88,923	62,303	70.06%	2,554	2.87%	49	0.06%	14,681	16.51%	25	0.03%	765	0.86%	4,053	4.56%	4,493	5.05%	
Somerville	Massachusetts	81,045	52,874	65.24%	4,215	5.20%	80	0.10%	8,567	10.57%	12	0.01%	1,288	1.59%	4,850	5.98%	9,159	11.30%	
Norwalk	Connecticut	91,184	44,314	48.60%	11,074	12.14%	102	0.11%	4,772	5.23%	14	0.02%	652	0.72%	2,627	2.88%	27,629	30.30%	
Danbury	Connecticut	86,518	37,963	43.88%	5,630	6.51%	70	0.08%	5,339	6.17%	25	0.03%	2,980	3.44%	5,821	6.73%	28,960	33.16%	
Edmond	Oklahoma	94,428	67,978	71.99%	6,033	6.39%	2,069	2.19%	3,354	3.55%	129	0.14%	297	0.31%	7,945	8.41%	6,623	7.01%	
Longmont	Colorado	98,885	64,916	65.65%	900	0.91%	447	0.45%	3,490	3.53%	65	0.07%	514	0.52%	4,096	4.14%	24,457	24.73%	
Lawrence	Kansas	94,934	69,414	73.12%	4,868	5.13%	2,346	2.47%	4,506	4.75%	65	0.07%	421	0.44%	5,985	6.30%	7,329	7.72%	
Boca Raton	Florida	97,422	68,941	70.77%	5,198	5.34%	94	0.10%	3,191	3.28%	32	0.03%	858	0.88%	4,340	4.45%	14,768	15.16%	
Sunrise	Florida	97,335	24,490	25.16%	30,270	31.10%	109	0.11%	3,929	4.04%	70	0.07%	1,010	1.04%	3,420	3.51%	34,037	34.97%	
Deltona	Florida	93,692	42,893	45.78%	9,837	10.50%	200	0.21%	1,328	1.42%	61	0.07%	533	0.57%	3,581	3.82%	35,259	37.63%	
Plantation	Florida	91,750	37,976	41.39%	18,961	20.67%	135	0.15%	4,146	4.52%	26	0.03%	1,003	1.09%	3,815	4.16%	25,688	28.00%	
Palm Coast	Florida	89,258	62,158	69.64%	9,249	10.36%	223	0.25%	2,161	2.42%	55	0.06%	614	0.69%	3,852	4.32%	10,946	12.26%	
Deerfield Beach	Florida	86,859	36,225	41.71%	21,202	24.41%	123	0.14%	1,616	1.86%	32	0.04%	2,843	3.27%	7,250	8.35%	17,568	20.23%	
Fort Myers	Florida	86,395	41,044	47.51%	18,891	21.87%	135	0.16%	2,085	2.41%	16	0.02%	666	0.77%	3,157	3.65%	20,401	23.61%	
Melbourne	Florida	84,678	57,743	68.19%	8,070	9.53%	213	0.25%	3,063	3.62%	42	0.05%	528	0.62%	4,365	5.15%	10,654	12.58%	
Miami Beach	Florida	82,890	33,274	40.14%	2,201	2.66%	76	0.09%	1,606	1.94%	22	0.03%	841	1.01%	2,894	3.49%	41,976	50.64%	
Largo	Florida	82,485	59,815	72.52%	5,137	6.23%	185	0.22%	2,641	3.20%	105	0.13%	459	0.56%	3,612	4.38%	10,531	12.77%	
Homestead	Florida	80,737	8,768	10.86%	14,006	17.35%	65	0.08%	877	1.09%	39	0.05%	495	0.61%	1,436	1.78%	55,051	68.19%	
Boynton Beach	Florida	80,380	37,989	47.26%	24,604	30.61%	92	0.11%	1,896	2.36%	18	0.02%	602	0.75%	2,763	3.44%	12,416	15.45%	
