= Irma Pane =

Indonesian American pop singer

- Born: Bandung, Indonesia
- Genres: Pop
- Years active: 1977–present
- Labels: Purnama Records; IPB Disc
- Website: http://www.irmapane.com/

Irma Pane is an Indonesian American pop singer.

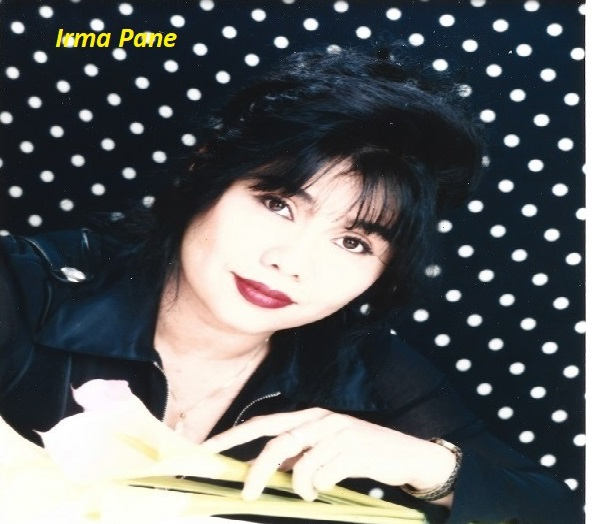

== Biography ==
Irma Pane was born to Maj. Gen.TNI Timoer Pane and Nurlina Lubis in Bandung, Indonesia. She graduated from SMA 3 Bandung and studied classic voice/technique at Radio Republic Indonesia. She has resided in Potomac, Maryland since 1996. Her 1979 album, Irma Pane Volume II, made Top 10 lists.

== Discography ==
- Irma Pane Volume I (1977, Purnama Records)
- Irma Pane Volume II (1979, Purnama Records)
- Haruskah (1997, IPB Disc)
