= Demographics of Seattle =

- Population pyramid of Seattle in 2021
- Population: 737,015 (2020)

The population of the city of Seattle, in the U.S. state of Washington, was 737,015 in the 2020 United States census. Only about a fifth of the households include minor children, and more people live alone here than any other U.S. city besides San Francisco. Seattle's population is mostly white, with a relatively large minority of Asians. It has the largest African American population in the American Pacific Northwest and a rapidly growing Latino population. About half the population are Christians, most of whom are Protestants, and about a third are unaffiliated.

As of a 2019 estimate, less than 30% of adults in Seattle were born in Washington state, with the majority born in other parts of the United States. Approximately 20% were born abroad.

== Population ==
Historical population
Census	Pop.	Note	%±
1860	188		—
1870	1,151		512.2%
1880	3,533		207.0%
1890	42,837		1,112.5%
1900	80,671		88.3%
1910	237,194		194.0%
1920	315,312		32.9%
1930	365,583		15.9%
1940	368,302		0.7%
1950	467,591		27.0%
1960	557,087		19.1%
1970	530,831		−4.7%
1980	493,846		−7.0%
1990	516,259		4.5%
2000	563,374		9.1%
2010	608,660		8.0%
2020	737,015		21.1%
2024 (est.)	780,995		6.0%

=== Racial and ethnic composition ===
Seattle city, Washington – Racial and ethnic composition Note: the US Census treats Hispanic/Latino as an ethnic category. This table excludes Latinos from the racial categories and assigns them to a separate category. Hispanics/Latinos may be of any race.
Race / Ethnicity (NH = Non-Hispanic)	Pop 1980	Pop 1990	Pop 2000	Pop 2010	Pop 2020	% 1980	% 1990	% 2000	% 2010	% 2020
White alone (NH)	387,068	380,423	382,532	403,578	438,168	78.38%	73.69%	67.90%	66.31%	59.45%
Black or African American alone (NH)	46,173	50,918	46,545	47,113	50,234	9.35%	9.86%	8.26%	7.74%	6.82%
Native American or Alaska Native alone (NH)	6,253	6,674	5,004	3,881	3,268	1.27%	1.29%	0.89%	0.64%	0.44%
Asian alone (NH)	36,613	59,141	73,512	83,537	124,696	7.41%	11.46%	13.05%	13.72%	16.92%
Native Hawaiian or Pacific Islander alone (NH)	x	x	2,715	2,246	1,941	x	x	0.48%	0.37%	0.26%
Other race alone (NH)	5,093	754	1,656	1,464	4,473	1.03%	0.15%	0.29%	0.24%	0.61%
Mixed race or Multiracial (NH)	x	x	21,691	26,512	53,672	x	x	3.85%	4.36%	7.28%
Hispanic or Latino (any race)	12,646	18,349	29,719	40,329	60,563	2.56%	3.55%	5.28%	6.63%	8.22%
Total	493,846	516,259	563,374	608,660	737,015	100.00%	100.00%	100.00%	100.00%	100.00%

=== 2000 census ===
As of the U.S. Census of 2000, there were 563,374 people, 258,499 households, and 113,481 families residing in the city of Seattle. The population density was 2,593.5 people/km^{2} (6,717 people/mi^{2}). There were 270,524 housing units at an average density of 1,245.4 units/km^{2} (3,226 units/mi^{2}).

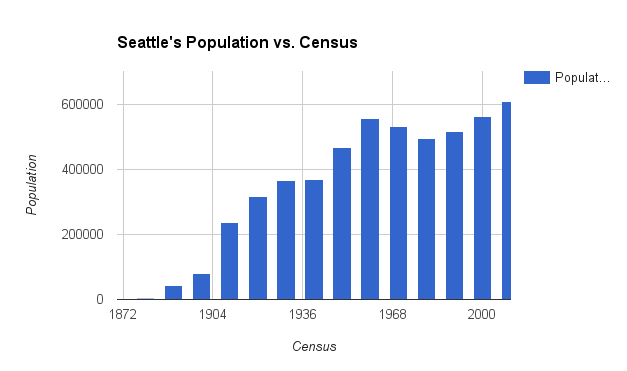
Seattle's historical population

During the day, incoming commuters increase Seattle's population by about 30%.

According to Census 2010, there were a total of 283,510 households in Seattle. Of these, 42.9% were family households and 57.1% were non-family households. A total of 19.5% of households had children under 18 years, and 17.6% had someone over the age of 65. The average household size was 2.06, while the average family size was 2.87. The city is second-last in terms of households with children, with only 19.1% of households reporting children under 18 living with them. Only San Francisco has a lower percentage of families with children. Seattle also sports the fifth-highest percentage of adults living alone in the country.

In the city the population was spread out, with 15.6% under the age of 18, 11.9% from 18 to 24, 38.6% from 25 to 44, 21.9% from 45 to 64, and 12.0% who were 65 years of age or older. The median age was 35 years. For every 100 females, there were 99.5 males. For every 100 females age 18 and over, there were 98.8 males.

The median income for a household in the city was $45,736, and the median income for a family was $62,195. Males had a median income of $40,929 versus $35,134 for females. The per capita income for the city was $30,306. 11.8% of the population and 6.9% of families were below the poverty line, 13.8% of which were under the age of 18 and 10.2% of which were 65 or older.

Seattle has the largest African American population of any city in the Pacific Northwest, it is largely concentrated in the Central District, High Point and Rainier Beach neighborhoods, which are at least 15% Black.. While Seattle's Hispanic population is only 6.6%, it is largely concentrated on the city's South Park neighborhood.

In addition, the city has seen a major uptick in immigration in recent decades. The foreign-born population increased 40 percent between the 1990 and 2000 census. Although the 2000 census shows only 5.28% of the population as Hispanic or Latino of any race, Hispanics are believed to be the most rapidly growing population group in Washington State, with an estimated increase of 10% just in the years 2000–2002.

== Ethnic groups ==
Ethnic groups in Seattle, according to the 2010 United States Census.
1. Non-Hispanic White (66.3%)
2. Asian (13.8%)
3. Black or African American (7.90%)
4. Hispanic or Latino (6.60%)
5. American Indian and Alaska Native (0.80%)
6. Native Hawaiian and Other Pacific Islander (0.40%)
7. Other (4.20%)

According to the 2020 United States Census, Seattle had a population of 737,015:

- White – 59.5%
- Asian - 16.9%
- Black or African American - 6.8%
- Native Hawaiian & Other Pacific Islander - 0.3%
- Another race - 0.6%
- American Indian & Alaska Native - 0.4%
- Two or more races - 7.3%
- Hispanic or Latino ethnicity (of any race): 8.2%.

This reflects a shift and 21% increase in population from the 2010 census, which counted a population of 608,660:

- White: 69.5% (Non-Hispanic Whites: 66.3%)
- Asian: 13.8% (4.1% Chinese, 2.6% Filipino, 2.2% Vietnamese, 1.3% Japanese, 1.1% Korean, 0.8% Indian, 0.3% Indonesian, 0.3% Cambodian, 0.3% Laotian, 0.2% Pakistanis, 0.2% Thai)
- Black or African American: 7.9% (including Somalis)
- Hispanic or Latino (of any race): 9.0% (4.0% Mexican, 2.3% Puerto Rican, 1.3% Colombian, 0.2% Guatemalan, 0.2% Salvadoran, 0.2% Cuban)
- American Indian and Alaska Native: 0.8%
- Native Hawaiian and Other Pacific Islander: 0.4%
- Other race: 2.4%
- Two or more races: 5.1%

The racial composition of the city in 2016 was 65.7% White, 14.1% Asian, 7.0% Black, 0.4% Native American, 0.9% Pacific Islander, 2.3% from other races, and 5.6% from two or more races. 6.6% of the population is Hispanic or Latino of any race. Amongst the city's European origin population, 11.3% were of German, 9.1% Irish, 8.1% English and 5.0% Norwegian ancestry according to Census 2000.

== Religion ==
Religion in Seattle (2024)
1. No religion (44.0%)
2. Protestantism (31.0%)
3. Roman Catholicism (11.0%)
4. The Church of Jesus Christ of Latter-day Saints (2.00%)
5. Jehovah's Witnesses (1.00%)
6. Other Christian (1.00%)
7. Judaism (1.00%)
8. Buddhism (4.00%)
9. Hinduism (1.00%)
10. Islam (2.00%)
11. No response given/Unknown (2.00%)

Seattle residents identify as mostly various types of Christian (44%), but with a large portion of irreligious. Seattle residents' current religious affiliations are shown in the table below:

- Christianity 44%
  - Protestantism 31%
    - Evangelical Protestant 21%
    - Mainline Protestant 9%
    - Historically Black Protestant 1%
  - Catholicism 11%
  - Mormonism 1%
  - Jehovah's Witness <1%
  - Other Christian 1%
- Non-Christian Faiths 11%
  - Buddhism 4%
  - Islam 2%
  - Judaism 1%
  - Hinduism 1%
  - Other religion 3%
- Unaffiliated 44%

== Housing and homeless issues ==
Estimates of Seattle's homeless population put the number somewhere around 6,000 to 8,000 people; up to 1,000 are children and young adults. As of January 27, 2017, according to the Point-In-Time Count in Seattle/King County, an annual count of individuals, youth, and families experiencing homelessness in Seattle and King County, there were a total of 11,643 individuals experiencing homelessness, of which 47% were unsheltered, which included 13% on the street, 20% in vans or RVs, 13% in tents and 1% in abandoned buildings.

== See also ==
- Homelessness in Seattle
- History of the Chinese Americans in Seattle
- History of the Japanese in Seattle (Japanese Americans and temporary expatriates)
