= Permias =

US organization for Indonesian college students

PERMIAS is an organization that unites Indonesian college students in the United States. The organization was founded on 24 December 1961 in Washington, D.C. PERMIAS is an Indonesian acronym for Persatuan Mahasiswa Indonesia Seluruh Amerika Serikat, 'Organization of the Indonesian Students in the United States'. The group organizes many annual events and competitions for Indonesian students in the US.

== About ==
Sometimes Permias is also referred to as Indonesian Student Association (ISA), the equivalent to Persatuan Pelajar Indonesia [PPI], the organization for other countries, such as the United Kingdom). ISA, however, only accepts members from certain institutes or universities, whereas Permias more loosely accepts members from schools within the region, and sometimes even non-students like alumni.

Every Permias chapter is independent and rarely has ties with other Permias groups, except for the Permias National Chapter. The Permias National Chapter is the head of the regional Permias chapters. Representatives of each Permias chapter are encouraged to meet at the Permias National Congress, which occurs every two to three years. The first National Congress was the Congress of Indonesian Diaspora.

Due to the decrease in the Indonesian student population in the United States, the National Congress events have held been inconsistently. The decline of the student population is mostly caused by the financial crisis in 1998–1999. However, the current trend shows a constant increase in the Indonesian student population in the United States. During the 2011–2012 academic year, there were about 7,131 Indonesian students in the United States. It is still far from the peak of 13,828 students during the 1997–1998 academic year, however. The current growth rate of the Indonesian student population is about 2.7% per year.

After a long hiatus, the National Congress was again held on May 25, 2013, in Washington D.C., called the Permias Congress 2013. The following National Congress was held on May 23, 2015, in New York City.

The organization also holds the Permias National Cup, an athletic event where each region (east, west, midwest) of Permias chapters competes against each other in basketball and soccer tournaments. The first- and second-place winners from each region then compete in the Permias National Cup. The first Permias National Cup was held in Chicago in 2014. Teams competing in the basketball tournament were Madison, Purdue, Chicago, Massachusetts, Los Angeles, Seattle and New York City. In the futsal tournament, there were Penn State, Purdue, Chicago and Milwaukee, Urbana-Champaign, Massachusetts, Los Angeles, DC, Seattle and New York City. The next Permias National Cup will be held in around February 2016 at Seattle.

== Chapters ==
Permias has over 80 chapters across the United States. There is no exact data on the number of Permias/ISA chapters in the US, as there are no annual meetings between local organizations' officers.

== Committee ==
The Permias National Chapter is led by a Secretary General followed by a Deputy Secretary General. Committees include Communication, Social, Cultural, Academic, Finance and Administration. Also, representatives of each Permias chapter serve on the council. The council is led by the Secretary General and the Deputy Secretary General, whereas the Committees are a separate entity that is supervised by the Council.

== See also ==
- Indonesian American
- Indonesia
- New England Indonesian Festival
