= New England Indonesian Festival =

Annual cultural festival in Massachusetts, US

- Genre: Cultural
- Dates: September
- Location: (United States) Copley Square in Boston, Massachusetts
- Years active: 2
- Founded: 2013
- Patron: PERMIAS Massachusetts
- Website: Neindofest.com

The New England Indonesian Festival is an annual cultural festival held at Copley Square located in Boston, Massachusetts. The first festival was held on September 14, 2013. Its organisers said that it was the first and biggest Indonesian cultural festival to be held in the East Coast area, with more than 5,000 audience and hundreds of performers.

This festival is organized by Permias Massachusetts, an all-student committee, Indonesian community in the New England area, Ministry of Culture and Tourism (Indonesia), Consulate General and the Embassy of the Republic of Indonesia. The festival aims to be a showcase of the indigenous culture of Indonesia, including batik, handicraft, traditional dance, food tasting and Indonesia's mainstream entertainment industry.
