= Igor Sanders =

Dutch-Indonesian footballer (born 2007)

Personal information
- Full name: Igor Arungbumi Sanders
- Date of birth: 5 February 2007 (age 19)
- Place of birth: Eindhoven, Netherlands
- Height: 1.75 m (5 ft 9 in)
- Position: Forward

Team information
- Current team: FC Eindhoven

Youth career
- Years: Team
- 2013–2019: VV Wodan
- 2020–: FC Eindhoven

Igor Arungbumi Sanders (born 5 February 2007) is an Indonesian footballer who plays as a forward for Dutch side FC Eindhoven.

== Early life ==
Sanders was born in Eindhoven, the Netherlands, to an Indonesian mother from Yogyakarta and Dutch father, Rob Sanders.

== Club career ==
Sanders began his career at VV Wodan, where he played between the ages of six and twelve. He later joined the academy of professional side FC Eindhoven, where he also played futsal.

== International career ==
In July 2023, it was first reported that Sanders held an Indonesian passport, and was eligible to represent the national team. Later in the same month, he received his first call-up to the under-17 team for a training camp. However, Sanders, alongside Althaf Khan, were sent home by manager Bima Sakti mid-way through the camp after failing to meet the expected level of performance.
