= Althaf Khan =

Indonesian-American footballer (born 2007)

Personal information
- Full name: Althaf Fawwaz Khan
- Date of birth: 7 July 2007 (age 19)
- Place of birth: Bandung, Indonesia
- Height: 1.75 m (5 ft 9 in)
- Position: Defensive midfielder

Team information
- Current team: FC 08 Homburg

Youth career
- Years: Team
- 2014–2015: SSB Ragunan
- 2017–2019: Rolla Knights
- 2019–2021: Billings United
- 2021–2023: Barça Residency Academy
- 2025–: Homburg

Althaf Fawwaz Khan (born 7 July 2007) is an Indonesian footballer who plays as a defensive midfielder for Regionalliga Südwest club Homburg.

== Early life ==
Khan was born in Bandung, Indonesia, but moved to Houston in the United States in 2011.

== Club career ==
Having played briefly at the Tod Soccer Academy in Houston, he returned to Indonesia in 2013, and joined the SSB Ragunan academy the following year. His parents moved again in September 2016, this time to Rolla, Missouri, and Khan joined the academy of local side Rolla Knights in early 2017, playing matches in St. Louis, two hours from Rolla.

His family again relocated in 2019, moving to Colstrip, Montana, with Khan joining Billings United in Billings, Montana, two hours from Colstrip. Having impressed coaches, he was moved from under-13 to under-14 level a year early. While in Montana, Khan also tried out at the Montana Olympic Development Program, and was accepted into their soccer team. After two years with Billings United, he enrolled at the Barça Residency Academy in Arizona in 2021.

On his call-up to a training camp with the under-17 national team, Khan was reported to no longer be at the Barça Residency Academy. Having reportedly been removed from the training camp, alongside Igor Sanders, by manager Bima Sakti, Khan joined the academy of German side Schalke 04 in August 2023, as part of an American under-18 team spending a season in Germany as guests. A year later, he would begin training with Hertha BSC.

== International career ==
In August 2023, Khan was called up to the Indonesia under-17 team for a training camp in Bali. While attending the training camp, he scored in a 3–0 friendly win against the under-17 side of Persis Solo.
