= Shandra Woworuntu =

Indonesian-American Human Rights Defender

Shandra Woworuntu is an Indonesian-American woman who is the former chair of the International Survivor of Trafficking Advisory Council to the OSCE - ODIHR She was appointed the first member of the U.S. Advisory Council to the White House on Human Trafficking after she testified before the Senate in 2015. She is an activist, advocate and survivor of human trafficking and domestic violence. Her focus is survivor mentorship and empowerment to help survivors to build their life independently. She travelled around the world to prevent human trafficking through education, lecture, training and awareness to eradicate human trafficking globally. She believes survivor inclusion is essential to anti-trafficking.

Woworuntu was born in Indonesia, June 14th 1976. In 2001, she came to the USA for a seasonal job in the hospitality industry but was kidnapped, forced into the sex industry and prostituted. She eventually escaped her captors and helped convict her traffickers. In 2009, Woworuntu was granted permanent residency in the US and became a U.S. citizen through naturalization.

On 20 March 2014, Governor Chris Christie appointed Woworuntu to be a Commissioner on Human Trafficking for the state of New Jersey. On 16 December 2015, President Obama appointed Woworuntu as one of eleven members of the U.S. Advisory Council on Human Trafficking and the council held their first meeting on 18 October 2016.

Woworuntu was curator of the Design and Violence published in 2015 by Museum of Modern Art, she laid the abuse of captivity, sexual exploitation and gun violence.

Woworuntu is the founder and CEO of the Mentari Human Trafficking Survivor Empowerment Program Inc, an organization aimed at empowering human trafficking survivors in their reintegration back into community, and society.

As a survivor leader, Woworuntu helps other survivors through an empowerment program. In 2017, Woworuntu was recognized as the L’Oréal Paris Women of Worth National Honoree through a public vote and rewarded with a $35,000 (~$43,918 in 2024) contribution for Mentari to continue making a difference in the lives of sex-trafficking survivors. As a survivor advocate and lobbyist, she helps to pass local and federal anti-trafficking legislation and was recognized as the 2020 Power of Diversity the most influential 100 Asian American in New York Politics and Policy. She was recognized as one of the Power Diversity Asian 100: New York's Asian American leaders, and received recognition from the NYC Mayor's Office to End Domestic and Gender-Based Violence as a 2021 Advocate of New York City. In 2022, she was named as one of the 2022 Power of Diversity Asian 100: New York's Asian American trailblazers.

Woworuntu is the author of Taste of Freedom, Recipes for Resilience, a cookbook dedicated to the culinary art program she founded through Mentari Human Trafficking Survivor Empowerment Program Inc.
