= Rory Leidelmeyer =

American bodybuilder

Rory Leidelmeyer is an American bodybuilder who competed in the 1970s and 1980s. He is a former Mr. America and trained former football player Tony Mandarich. He also appeared in the Shaquille O'Neal film Kazaam (1996).
