= SMA Negeri 3 Bandung =

- Jalan Belitung 8, Kota Bandung

Information
- Type: Public, co-educational
- Motto: "Knowledge is Power but Character is More"
- Established: 1953
- Principal: Dr. Hj. Yeni Gantini, M.Pd.
- Enrollment: 450/year
- Colors: black and white
- Nickname: SMA Belitung
- Website: http://www.sman3bandung.sch.id/

SMA Negeri 3 Bandung (also known as SMU 3 Bandung or SMA 3 Bandung) is a public high school located at Belitung street in Bandung, Indonesia. It shares a building with SMA 5 Bandung, consequently giving the schools the nickname SMA Belitung after the street.

It is well renowned for producing the highest number of fresh graduates to Indonesia's top notch universities, most notably the Bandung Institute of Technology more than any other high school in the country on an annual basis.

== History ==
SMA Negeri 3 Bandung was established in 1953, occupying a former Dutch colonial school building. The building was designed by C.P. Wolff Schoemaker. Construction began in 1916. Initially three high schools shared the building, with the other two being SMA Negeri 2 and 5 Bandung.

By 1966, SMA Negeri 2 started occupying a new building in Jalan Cihampelas. SMA Negeri 3 has been using the eastern part of the building ever since, with SMA Negeri 5 residing in the rest.

== Academics ==
SMAN 3 Bandung has a strong academic standing, with most of its graduates enrolling in first tier institutes of higher learning in Indonesia, a majority of whom enroll in the famous Bandung Institute of Technology and other well accredited universities such as Padjadjaran University, The University of Indonesia and Gajah Mada University. This is attributed to the fact that students of the school performs regularly well in the university entrance exams such as in the mainstream selections of SBMPTN and SNMPTN(prior to 2013) as well as on 'private stream' exams administered by state universities as a separate stream of admission such as the SIMAK UI (administered by the University of Indonesia).

Ever since the enactment of new regulations by the Ministry of Education (currently known as the Ministry of Education and Culture) that significantly restructured the procedures of state-owned universities (PTN) admission process, SMAN 3 Bandung continues to perform well in admitting its students to top ranked state universities in the country. Although a decline in the number of students being admitted is a trend that follows such changes. Based on the new regulations, there is now a common streaming selection process called 'SNMPTN Jalur Undangan' when it was first established and currently just 'SNMPTN', is a means of admission conducted collectively by state-owned universities overseen by a board of academic/governmental dignitaries from the Ministry of Education and Culture to select student on the basis of academic grades on their report card along with other considerations such as non-academic merit. Students are also selected by the credibility of the educational institution he/she is currently enrolling in, thus due to SMAN 3 Bandung's highly accredited status, its students still manage to fill a large portion of the quota available and even still outperforming its rival SMA Negeri 8 Jakarta and SMA Negeri 5 Bandung (which is also concurrently its neighbour).

There are also records of students enrolling in foreign universities at an undergraduate level, however due to qualification constraints (as SMAN 3 Bandung is a standard public school offering only local qualification) such cases are rare. Students usually have to opt to take up other qualifications such as the Cambridge IGCSE or Cambridge International O Levels and Cambridge International A Levels (in which the students take as a private candidate in other collaborating schools that administers the exams) as well as SAT, but then again such cases are extremely rare but not unheard of. Students of SMAN 3 Bandung that harbour intentions of pursuing an undergraduate course of study in foreign universities are inclined to opt for universities that recognizes the Indonesian High School Diploma such as universities in Singapore. Graduates of the school however are more likely to enroll in foreign universities at a graduate level (in which qualification constraints are more to be less likely of a problem).

SMAN 3 Bandung regularly participates in Olympiads at regional (city), provincial, and national levels occasionally contributes delegates to the Indonesian team in International Science Olympiads.

SMAN 3 Bandung is also the high school with the highest passing grade in Bandung city, admitting middle school graduates with a cumulative grade point nearing 40.00 (the closest being in 2012 with a passing grade of 39.1). Its neighbour SMAN 5 Bandung ranks second in these criteria.

Science is the most prominent academic trait of the school. In fact, its science education is what sets it a level above other educational institutions of the same stage. Its science curriculum slightly differs from other schools, especially in Physics where syllabus components are not taught in accordance with the conventional order of the national curriculum. Students are taught mostly mechanics in their first year of study (along with other fundamentals such as physical units) and in their third (and final year of study) students who are sorted into the science stream are taught electricity and magnetism in the first semester of that year and modern physics in the following semester. Second year physics in SMAN 3 Bandung mostly covers miscellaneous components in the physics syllabus such as waves and optical physics. The math syllabus also differs from the conventional order, such as mathematical logic (a syllabus component meant to be covered in the first year of study) is instead covered in the final year.

The school is divided into nine classes every batch, with the trend being the majority of enrolled students preferring to major on science to humanities. Gifted student with excellent academic potential has the option to enroll in the academic accelerated program, shortening the time of study from three to two years.

== Student activity ==
Students choose extracurricular activities from a selection of clubs. They are: Moslem Society Council, Angklung Ensemble Society, Sundanese Culture Society, Classical Music Club, Tiloe's Theater, Japanese Language and Culture Study (Nihongo Kurabu 3), UBBAS3 (Basketball Club), Debating Club, also known as SEF 3 (Student English Forum 3), scouts movement ( Gugus Depan Kota Bandung 08033 dan 08034 ) and several others. The Angklung Ensemble Society (in Indonesian: Keluarga Paduan Angklung or KPA) has been invited to music festivals in Indonesia and overseas, including "Expanding Sound of Angklung" festival in 2002, 2004, and 2008 where the members were involved in European touring concerts taking place in Germany, Belgium, France, Italy, Greece, Poland, and several others.

== Notable alumni ==
- Adang Daradjatun, former Deputy Chief of the Indonesian National Police.
- Dada Rosada, 23rd Mayor of Bandung (2003-2013).
- Ridwan Kamil, 24th Mayor of Bandung (2013-2018).
- Karen Agustiawan, CEO of Pertamina
- Dwiki Dharmawan, Indonesian musician
- Didi Petet, Indonesian artist.
- Armida Alisjahbana, 1979 Indonesia's Minister of State for National Development Planning.
- Betti Alisjahbana, 1979 Former CEO of IBM Indonesia.
- Edwin Utama, Principal of Boston Consulting Group Indonesia.
- Fitri Megantara, Indonesian journalist and news anchor.
- Jayawijayaningtiyas, 2004 International Astronomy Olympiad Bronze Medallist.
- Indra Adrianto, 1995 International Geneticist/Statistician at the Oklahoma Medical Research Foundation
- Satria Zulkarnaen Bisri, Condensed Matter Physicist.
- Rizal Panji Islami, 2010 International Conference of Young Scientists Bronze Medallist.
