= Demographics of Buffalo, New York =

Buffalo, New York is the second most populous city in the state of New York, after New York City. The city has a population of 278,349 as of the 2020 Census and the Buffalo–Cheektowaga–Olean Combined Statistical Area is home to 1,215,826 residents.

== Background ==
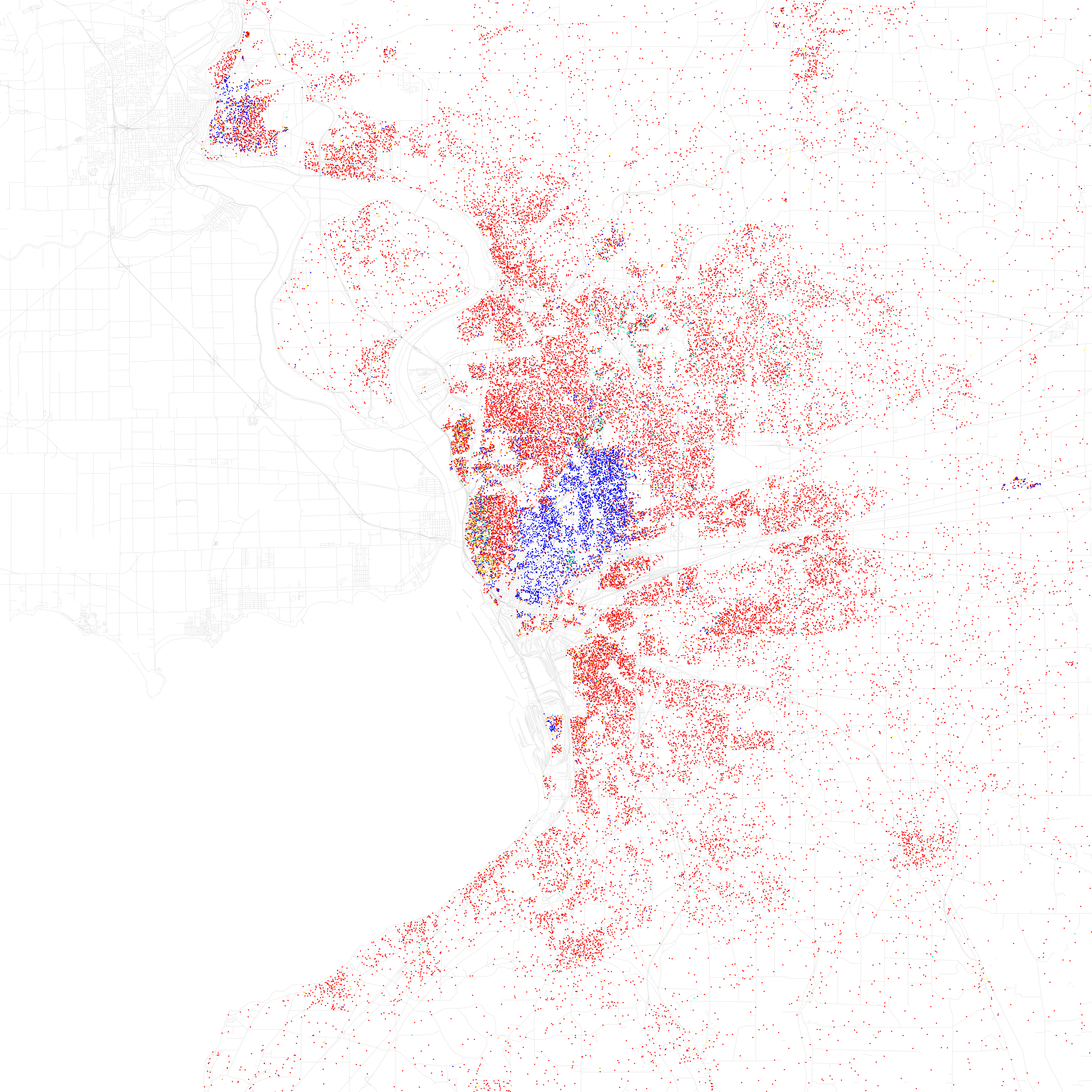
Map of racial distribution in Buffalo, 2010 U.S. Census. Each dot is 25 people: White, Black, Asian, Hispanic or Other (yellow)

Buffalo was first settled primarily by New Englanders. The first wave of European immigrants was a large influx of Germans. The city was further populated by Irish immigrants first, Erie Canal builders and then escaping famine, and infused by Polish, Italian, Jewish, and more recently Latino populations, all of which have made it a melting pot of ethnic cultures. The newest immigrants are from Somalia, Sudan, and Asia.

The Old First Ward retains a strong Irish identity, and Kaisertown reflects a German heritage. Buffalo's Polonia was centered at the Broadway Market on the East Side. The market serves as a microcosm of Polish/Slavic traditions and delicacies. The East Side is now home to African Americans, many of whom came north during the Great Migration. The annual Juneteenth Festival is a large cultural celebration organized by African Americans in Martin Luther King Jr. Park.

The West Side is home to the city's Hispanic community, predominantly of Puerto Rican descent. The West Side was once Buffalo's "Little Italy," but in the 1980s much of Buffalo's Italian American community moved to North Buffalo. There is also a small Italian-American enclave in the East Side neighborhood of Lovejoy. Many Buffalo households, churches, and restaurants continue to observe the Sicilian custom of preparing Saint Joseph's Day (March 19) tables, at which various meatless Lenten courses are laid out for the poor.

Buffalo is also home to a large Jewish community. German Jewish immigrants originally settled on Buffalo's Westside in the mid-19th century. Lower income Russian Jews and Polish Jews immigrating to the Niagara Frontier in the early 20th century initially settled on the Lower East Side, near William Street and Jefferson Avenue. The community migrated to the Masten Park neighborhood on the East Side, and then to North Buffalo between the 1940s and the 1960s. Although many still live in the city, particularly in North Buffalo and the Delaware District on the city's Westside, the majority of the Buffalo area's Jews now live in the northeastern suburbs. Buffalo's Jewish Community Centers are located in the Delaware District, North Buffalo and Amherst.

Distancing itself from its industrial past, Buffalo is redefining itself as a cultural, banking, educational, medical center and architectural tourism destination. In 2001, USA Today named Buffalo the winner of its "City with a Heart" contest. proclaiming it the nation's "friendliest city." Buffalo is also a two-time winner of the All-America City Award.

== Demographics ==
Historical population
| Census | Pop. | Note | %± |
|---|---|---|---|
| 1810 | 1,508 | | — |
| 1820 | 2,095 | | 38.9% |
| 1830 | 8,668 | | 313.7% |
| 1840 | 18,213 | | 110.1% |
| 1850 | 42,261 | | 132.0% |
| 1860 | 81,129 | | 92.0% |
| 1870 | 117,714 | | 45.1% |
| 1880 | 155,134 | | 31.8% |
| 1890 | 255,664 | | 64.8% |
| 1900 | 352,387 | | 37.8% |
| 1910 | 423,715 | | 20.2% |
| 1920 | 506,775 | | 19.6% |
| 1930 | 573,076 | | 13.1% |
| 1940 | 575,901 | | 0.5% |
| 1950 | 580,132 | | 0.7% |
| 1960 | 532,759 | | −8.2% |
| 1970 | 462,768 | | −13.1% |
| 1980 | 357,870 | | −22.7% |
| 1990 | 328,123 | | −8.3% |
| 2000 | 292,648 | | −10.8% |
| 2010 | 261,310 | | −10.7% |
| 2020 | 278,349 | | 6.5% |
Historical Population Figures; U.S. Decennial Census

| Historical racial composition | 2020 | 2010 | 1990 | 1970 | 1940 |
|---|---|---|---|---|---|
| White | 47.1% | 50.4% | 64.7% | 78.7% | 96.8% |
| Black or African American | 36.5% | 38.6% | 30.7% | 20.4% | 3.1% |
| Hispanic or Latino (of any race) | 12.3% | 10.5% | 4.9% | 1.6% | (X) |
| Asian | 5.9% | 3.2% | 1.0% | 0.2% | − |

=== 2020 census ===
Buffalo city, New York – Racial and ethnic composition Note: the US Census treats Hispanic/Latino as an ethnic category. This table excludes Latinos from the racial categories and assigns them to a separate category. Hispanics/Latinos may be of any race.
| Race / Ethnicity (NH = Non-Hispanic) | Pop 2000 | Pop 2010 | Pop 2020 | % 2000 | % 2010 | % 2020 |
|---|---|---|---|---|---|---|
| White alone (NH) | 151,450 | 119,801 | 108,652 | 51.75% | 45.85% | 39.03% |
| Black or African American alone (NH) | 107,066 | 97,637 | 99,102 | 36.59% | 37.36% | 35.60% |
| Native American or Alaska Native alone (NH) | 2,010 | 1,597 | 1,359 | 0.69% | 0.61% | 0.49% |
| Asian alone (NH) | 4,045 | 8,313 | 21,119 | 1.38% | 3.18% | 7.59% |
| Pacific Islander alone (NH) | 71 | 79 | 109 | 0.02% | 0.03% | 0.04% |
| Some Other Race alone (NH) | 474 | 445 | 1,387 | 0.16% | 0.17% | 0.50% |
| Mixed race or Multiracial (NH) | 5,456 | 5,919 | 10,978 | 1.86% | 2.27% | 3.94% |
| Hispanic or Latino (any race) | 22,076 | 27,519 | 35,643 | 7.54% | 10.53% | 12.81% |
| Total | 292,648 | 261,310 | 278,349 | 100.00% | 100.00% | 100.00% |

=== City proper ===
Like most formerly industrial cities of the Great Lakes region in the US, Buffalo has experienced an economic depression brought about by the loss of its industrial base. The city's population peaked in 1950, when it was the 15th largest city in the United States, before entering a long trend of losing population. The demographic change and the impact of such change on the industrial cities of the region, including Buffalo, is significant; based on the 2006 US Census estimate, Buffalo's population was equivalent to its population in the year 1890, reversing 120 years of demographic change. The 2020 Census was the first census in 70 years that saw Buffalo and Erie County gain population.

At the 2010 Census, the city's population was 50.4% White (45.8% non-Hispanic White alone), 38.6% Black or African American, 0.8% American Indian and Alaska Native, 3.2% Asian, 3.9% from some other race and 3.1% from two or more races. 10.5% of the total population was Hispanic or Latino of any race.

At the time of the 2000 census there were 292,648 people, 122,720 households, and 67,005 families residing in the city. The population density was 7,205.8 people per square mile (2,782.2 people/km^{2}). There were 145,574 housing units at an average density of 3,584.4 per square mile (1,383.9/km^{2}). The racial makeup of the city was 54.43% White, 37.23% African American, 0.77% Native American, 1.40% Asian, 0.04% Pacific Islander, 3.68% from other races, and 2.45% from two or more races. 7.54% of the population were Hispanic or Latino of any race. The top 5 largest ancestries include German (13.6%), Irish (12.2%), Italian (11.7%), Polish (11.7%), and English (4.0%).

There were 122,720 households, out of which 28.6% had children under the age of 18 living with them, 27.6% were married couples living together, 22.3% had a female householder with no husband present, and 45.4% were non-families. 37.7% of all households were made up of individuals, and 12.1% had someone living alone who was 65 years of age or older. The average household size was 2.29 and the average family size was 3.07.

In the city the population included 26.3% under the age of 18, 11.3% from 18 to 24, 29.3% from 25 to 44, 19.6% from 45 to 64, and 13.4% who were 65 years of age or older. The median age was 34 years. For every 100 females, there were 88.6 males. For every 100 females age 18 and over, there were 83.5 males.

The median income for a household in the city was $24,536, and the median income for a family was $30,614. Males had a median income of $30,938 versus $23,982 for females. The per capita income for the city was $14,991. 26.6% of the population and 23.0% of families were below the poverty line. Out of the total population, 38.4% of those under the age of 18 and 14.0% of those 65 and older were living below the poverty line.

Population of Buffalo, 1830–2006

Buffalo has very sizable populations of Bosnian, Irish, Italian, Polish, German, Hungarian, Jewish, Karen, Greek, Arab, African American, Indian, Macedonian, and Puerto Rican descent. Major ethnic neighborhoods still exist but they changed significantly in the second half of the 20th century. In 1940, non-Hispanic Whites were 96.8% of the city's population. In the early 1900s, Polish-American immigrants were the predominant occupants of the East Side, while Italian-Americans composed a close-knit neighborhood in the west side. The East Side has long since become a predominantly African American area, while the West Side has become a melting pot of many ethnicities, with Latino culture being the strongest influence. Throughout the history of Buffalo, the neighborhoods collectively called the First Ward, as well as much of South Buffalo, have comprised almost entirely people of Irish descent. Recently, there has been an influx of inhabitants that are of Arab descent, mainly from Yemen, as the city's Muslim population has increased to approximately 3000 according to an estimate. Since the 1950s and 1960s, the greater portion of the Jewish population has moved to the suburban areas outside of the city, or to the city's upper West Side.

=== Segregation ===
After the racist May 14, 2022 mass shooting at a Tops Supermarket on Buffalo's east side, much commentary focused on the level of segregation in the city. Demographers themselves do not agree on Buffalo's segregation ranking.

=== Metropolitan area ===
As of 2006, Erie and Niagara Counties had a combined estimated population of 1,154,378. The racial makeup of the area was 82.2% White, 13% African American, 0.6% Native American, 1.32% Asian, 3.3% Hispanic, and 1.4% of all other races. In the metropolitan area, 39.68% of people were under the age of 18 or over the age of 64, and the median age was 38. Of the total population, 82.88% had a high school diploma and 23.2% had obtained a Bachelor's degree. The median income for a household was $48,400 and the per capita income for the area was just under $39,000. Approximately 8% of the population was below the poverty line.
