= Rory =

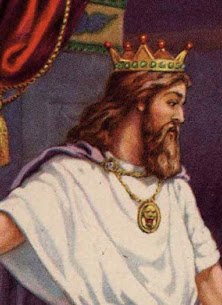
- Ruaidrí Ua Conchobair, last High King of Ireland
- Pronunciation: English: /ˈrɔːri/ ROR-ee
- Gender: Masculine (Ireland, Scotland); Unisex (United States, Canada)
- Language: English, Irish, Scottish

Origin
- Language: Celtic languages (Gaelic)
- Origin: Anglicisation of Ruairí/ Ruaidhrí (Irish) and Ruairidh/Ruaraidh (Scottish)
- Meaning: "red king"
- Region of origin: Ireland; Scotland

Other names
- Variant forms: Rorie; Rori
- Related names: Riordan, Roderick, from Ruairi (Ruaridh, Ruaidhrí, Ruairí, Ruairidh, Ruaraidh, Ruaidhrígh, "Ruari"), Aurora

Rory is a given name of Gaelic origin. It is an anglicisation of the Irish: Ruairí/Ruaidhrí and Scottish Gaelic: Ruairidh/Ruaraidh and is common to the Irish, Highland Scots and their diasporas. The meaning of the name is "red king", composed of ruadh ("red") and rígh ("king").

In Ireland and Scotland, it is generally seen as a masculine name and therefore rarely given to females.

== History ==
An early use of the name in antiquity is in reference to Rudraige mac Sithrigi, a High King of Ireland who eventually spawned the Ulaid (indeed, this tribe is sometimes known as Clanna Rudhraighe). Ruadrí mac Domnall was the grandfather of famous Scottish king Macbeth and the eponymous founder of Clann Ruaidrí (House of Moray). Throughout the Middle Ages, the name was in use by various kings, such as Ruaidrí mac Fáeláin, Ruaidrí na Saide Buide and Ruaidrí Ua Conchobair, the last High King of Ireland. As well as this, Ruairí Óg Ó Mórdha, the famous King of Laois, and his nephew Ruairí Ó Mórdha, who was a leader in the Irish Rebellion of 1641, held the name, and Ruaidrí Ó Domhnaill, King of Tyrconnell of the O'Donnell dynasty who was deeply involved in the saga known as the Flight of the Earls.

Rory has seen increasing use in females since the early 2000s, especially in the United States, where it became among the top 1000 female baby names in 2003. As of 2022, Rory ranked 280th in popularity for males and 335th for females in the US. A similar trend can be observed in Canada, where the name has seen increasing use in females since 2001 and especially 2015.

Rory can alternatively be a nickname for Aurora, Gloria, or Lorelai.

== Variations ==
The standard Scottish Gaelic pronunciation is /ˈruə̯.rʲɪ/, and in Munster Irish /rəiˈrʲiː/. In English, it is typically pronounced as English: /ˈrɔːri/ (ROR-ee). In Classical Gaelic, the name was written Ruaidhrigh, and in Old Irish Ruaidríg /ruaðʲr͈ʲiːʝʲ/ (Proto Celtic *roudo-riks). There are numerous other recorded variations of the name such as Ruaidrí, Ruaidhrí, Ruairdhrí, Rhuairidh, Ruaridh, Rhuari, Rhuaridh, Ruarídh, Ruarí, Roighrí, Rauridh or Raighrí. Historically, it has also been anglicised by replacement with the Germanic names Roderick and Roger, particularly the former.

Old Irish	Modern Irish	Scottish Gaelic	Modern Scottish	English
Ruaidhrí	Ruairí	Ruairidh	Ruaridh	Rory

== Men ==
=== Ruaidrí ===
- Ruaidrí mac Fáeláin (died 785), King of Leinster of the Uí Fáeláin sept of the Uí Dúnlainge branch of the Laigin
- Ruaidrí ua Canannáin (died 950), king of the Cenél Conaill, and according to some sources High King of Ireland
- Ruaidrí na Saide Buide (died 1118), called Ruaidrí na Saide Buide (Ruaidrí of the Yellow Birch), King of Connacht
- Ruaidrí Ua Conchobair, 12th century King of Connacht and the last High King of Ireland
- Ruaidri mac Cathal Ua Conchobair, King of Connacht in Ireland
- Ruaidri mac Tairdelbach Ua Conchobair, King of Connacht, died 1384
- Ruaidri Caech mac Diarmata (1404–1421), see Kings of Magh Luirg
- Ruaidri Óg mac Diarmata (1478–1486), see Kings of Magh Luirg
- Ruaidri mac Diarmata (1549–1568), see Kings of Magh Luirg
- Ruaidrí Ó Domhnaill (1575–1608), King and Earl of Tyrconnell
- Ruaidrí Ó Gadhra (died 1256), Irish king
- Ruaidri Ó Cellaigh (died 1339), Irish king
- Ruaidrí Ó Curnín (died 1496), Irish poet

=== Ruaidhrí ===
- Ruaidhri Ó Cianáin (died 1387), Irish historian
- Rúaidhrí Conroy (born 1979), Irish actor
- Ruaidhrí mac Coscraigh (fl. 990s), Irish king
- Rúaidhrí de Valera (1916–1978), Irish archaeologist
- Ruaidhrí Ó Dubhda (fl. 1380), Irish king
- Ruaidhrí Ó Flaithbheartaigh (1629–1716/18), Irish historian
- Ruaidhri Ó Flaithbheartaigh (fl. 1200s), Irish king
- Rúaidhri Ua Flaithbheartaigh (died 1061), Irish king
- Ruaidhri Ua Flaithbheartaigh (died 1145), Irish king
- Ruaidhrí Gilla Dubh Ó Seachnasaigh (died 1569), Irish knight
- Ruaidhrí Higgins (born 1984), manager of Derry City F.C. in the League of Ireland
- Ruaidhri Mac Aedha (died 1170), Irish lord
- Ruaidhrí mac Raghnaill (died 1247?), Hebridean magnate
- Ruaidhrí Mac Ruaidhrí (died 1318?), Scottish magnate
- Ruaidhrí Mear Ua Dubhda (fl. 1100s), Irish king
- Ruaidhrí Murphy (born 1987), Irish rugby union footballer
- Ruaidhri Roberts (1917–1986), Irish trade union leader
- Ruaidhri Smith (born 1994), Scottish cricketer

=== Ruadhri ===
- Ruadhri of Bute (fl. 13th century), Scottish noble
- Ruadhri Ua Flaithbertaigh (fl. late 12th century), Irish king

=== Ruari ===
- Ruari Crichard (born 1995), English cricketer
- Ruari MacLennan (born 1988), Scottish footballer
- Ruari McLean (1917–2006), British typographic designer
- Ruari Paton (born 2000), Irish footballer

=== Ruairí ===
- Bantum (real name Ruairí Lynch; born 1983), Irish multi-instrumentalist, musician, DJ, producer and composer
- Ruairí Mac Easmainn (1864–1916), Irish patriot, poet, revolutionary and nationalist
- Ruairí Brugha (1917–2006), Irish politician
- Ruairí Ó Brádaigh (1932–2013), Irish Republican Army member
- Ruairí Canavan (born 2003), Gaelic footballer
- Ruairi O'Connor (born 1991), Irish actor
- Ruairí Convery (born 1984), Northern Irish hurler
- Ruairí Deane (born 1991), Irish Gaelic footballer
- Ruairí Ó Gadhra (died 1206), Irish king
- Ruairi Glynn, installation artist
- Ruairí Harkin (born 1989), Irish footballer
- Ruairí Keating (born 1995), Irish footballer
- Ruairi McGoff (born 1985), English-Canadian rugby league footballer
- Ruairí McKiernan, Irish author and social entrepreneur
- Ruairí Ó Murchú (born 1978), Irish politician
- Ruairi Quinn (born 1946), Irish politician
- Ruairi O'Rahilly, Gaelic footballer
- Ruairí Robinson (born 1978), Irish film director and writer
- Ruairí McKiernan (born 1977), Irish social activist

=== Ruaraidh ===
- Ruaraidh Erskine (1869–1960), Scottish nationalist
- Ruaraidh Murray (born 1975), Scottish actor, writer and comedian

=== Ruairidh ===
- Ruairidh Campbell (born 1998), Scottish rugby union referee
- Ruairidh Greenwood (born 1992), Scottish curler
- Ruairidh MacIlleathain, Scottish Gaelic broadcaster

=== Ruaridh ===
- Ruaridh Arrow (born 1980), British film-maker
- Ruaridh Jackson (born 1988), Scottish rugby union player
- Ruaridh Langan (born 1998), Scottish footballer
- Ruaridh MacKenzie (born 1994), Scottish rugby union player
- Ruaridh McConnochie (born 1991), English rugby union player
- Ruaridh Mollica, Scottish-Italian actor

=== Rory ===
- Rory Anderson (born 1992), American football player
- Rory Barnes (born 1946), Australian writer
- Rory Best (born 1982), Irish rugby union footballer
- Rory Boulding (born 1988), English footballer
- Rory Brady (1957–2010), Irish lawyer
- Rory Bremner (born 1961), Scottish comedian
- Rory Brennan (poet) (born 1945), Irish poet
- Rory Brien (born 1991), rugby league footballer
- Rory Burns (born 1990), English cricketer
- Rory Byrne (born 1944), South African racing car designer
- Rory Calhoun (1922–1999), American actor
- Rory Carroll (born 1972), Irish journalist
- Rory Cellan-Jones (born 1958), British journalist
- Rory Cochrane (born 1972), American actor
- Rory Collins (born 1955), epidemiologist
- Rory Enrique Conde (born 1965), Colombian serial killer
- Rory Culkin (born 1989), American actor
- Rory Delap (born 1976), Irish football player
- Rory Dodd, Canadian rock vocalist
- Rory Fairweather-Neylan (born 1987), Australian ballet dancer
- Rory Fallon (born 1982), New Zealand football player
- Rory Feely (born 1997), Irish association football player
- Rory Fitzpatrick (born 1975), American ice hockey player
- Rory Gallagher (1948–1995), Irish musician
- Roderick "Rory" Gibson (born 1995), American actor
- Rory Hamilton-Brown (born 1987), English cricketer
- Rory Jacob (born 1983), Irish hurler
- Rory Jennings (born 1983), British actor
- Rory Johnson (born 1986), American football player
- Rory Jones (born 1955), South African football player
- Rory Kiely (1934–2018), Irish politician
- Rory Kinnear (born 1978), English actor
- Rory Kockott (born 1986), South African rugby player representing France internationally
- Rory Lamont (born 1982), Scottish rugby player
- Rory Lawson (born 1981), Scottish international rugby union player
- Rory Lee Feek (born 1966), American country music singer and songwriter
- Rory Leidelmeyer, American bodybuilder
- Rory Loy (born 1988), Scottish footballer
- Rory Macdonald (conductor) (born 1980), Scottish conductor
- Rory MacDonald (fighter) (born 1989), Canadian professional mixed martial artist
- Rory Macdonald (musician) (born 1949), Scottish bassist
- Rory MacGregor (born 1976), British actor
- Rory MacLean (born 1954), Canadian writer
- Rory Makem (born 1969) Irish-American musician
- Rory Markas (1955–2010), American sportscaster
- Rory Markham (born 1982), American mixed martial artist
- Rory McCann (born 1969), Scottish actor
- Rory McEwen (politician) (born 1948), Australian politician
- Rory McEwen (artist) (1932–1982), Scottish artist and musician
- Rory McGrath (born 1956), English comedian
- Rory McIlroy (born 1989), Northern Irish golfer
- Rory McLeod (singer-songwriter) (born 1957), English singer-songwriter
- Rory McLeod (snooker player) (born 1971), English professional snooker player
- Rory McTurk, British philologist
- Rory O'Connor (Irish republican) (1883–1922), Irish republican activist
- Rory O'Hanlon (born 1934), Irish politician
- Rory O'Malley (born 1980), Broadway actor
- Rory O'Moore (1620–1655), Irish rebel
- Rory O'Tunny (c. 1541–1542), Irish sculptor
- Rory Peck (1956–1993), British journalist
- Rory Reid (born 1963), American politician
- Rory Sabbatini (born 1976), South African golfer
- Rory J Saper (born 1996), English actor
- Rory Schlein (born 1984), Australian speedway rider
- Rory Singer (born 1976), American mixed martial artist
- Rory Sparrow (born 1958), American basketball player
- Rory Smith (born 1987), Canadian lacrosse player
- Rory Steele (born 1943), Australian author
- Rory Stewart (born 1973), British politician, diplomat and author
- Rory Storm (1938–1972), English musician
- Rory Sutherland (born 1982), Australian racing cyclist
- Rory Underwood (born 1963), English rugby player
- Rory Watson (born 1996), English footballer

=== Rorie ===
- Rorie Henderson (born 1959), British rower

== Women ==
- Rory Block (born 1949), American blues guitarist and singer
- Rory Bosio (born 1984), American ultramarathon runner
- Rory Flack (born 1971), American figure skater
- Rory Guilday (born 2002), American ice hockey player
- Rory Kennedy (born 1968), American filmmaker
- Rory Martinez, Mexican-American director
- Rory Owen (born 2003), Australian professional rugby league footballer
- Rory Power, American author
- Rory Quintos (born 1962), Filipino television and film director
- Rory Uphold, Canadian-American singer-songwriter and actress

== Fictional characters ==
=== Male characters ===
- Roary in the television show Roary the Racing Car
- Rory Finnigan in the television series Hollyoaks
- Rory Flanagan in the television series Glee
- Rory Hennessy in the television series 8 Simple Rules
- Rory Murdoch in the television series River City
- Rory Regan, Ragman in the DC Comics Universe
- Rory Williams in the television series Doctor Who
- Rory Walker in the movie The Conjuring

=== Female characters ===
- Lorelai "Rory" Gilmore in the television series Gilmore Girls.
- Rory Mercury in the anime and light novel series Gate.
- Aurora "Rory" Morningstar, from the series "Lucifer".

== See also ==
- List of Irish-language given names
- List of Scottish Gaelic given names
