= Aurora (given name) =

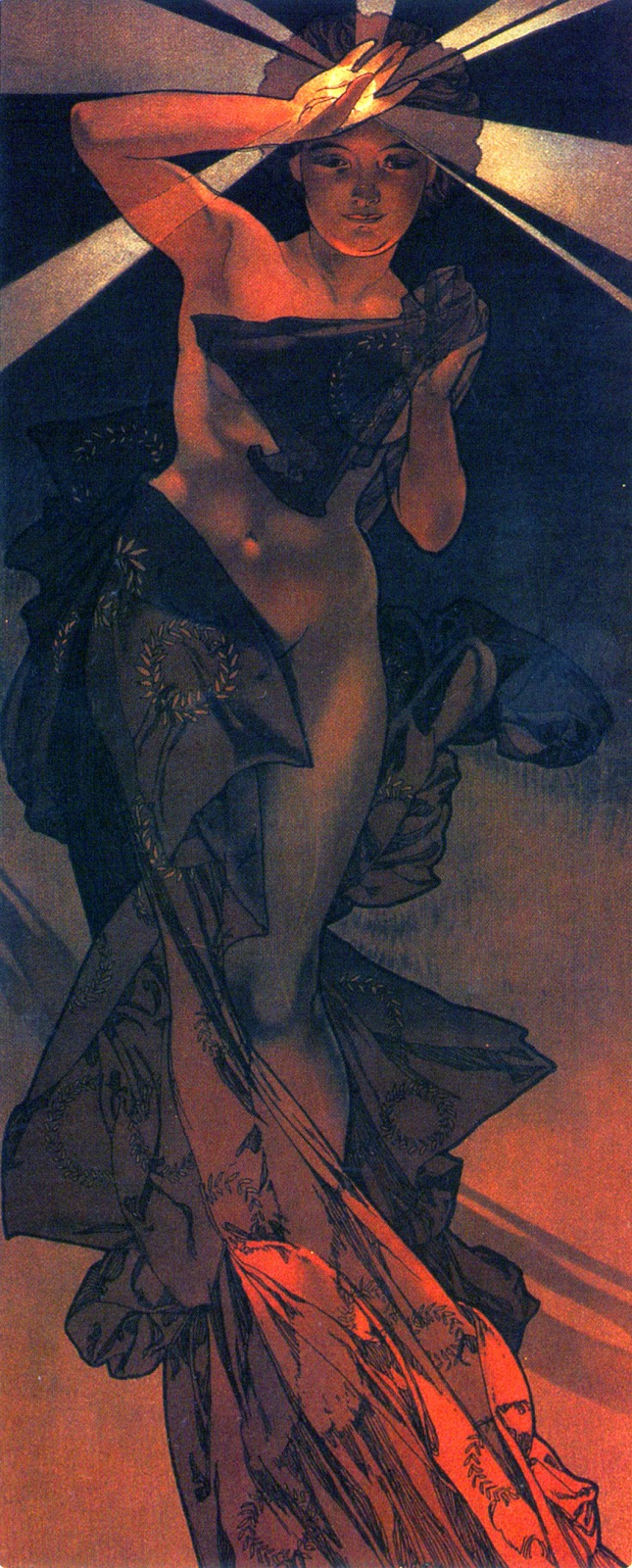
- Morning Star, part of a 1902 Art Nouveau decorative panel by Alfons Mucha.
- Gender: Female

Origin
- Origin: Latin
- Meaning: Dawn

Other names
- Related names: Aurore, Rory

Aurora is a feminine given name, originating from the name of the ancient Roman goddess of dawn, Aurora. Her tears were said to turn into the morning dew. Each morning she traveled in her chariot across the sky from east to west, proclaiming renewal with the rising of the sun. The Romans also associated the Northern Lights, or the Aurora borealis, with the goddess. Aurora is also traditionally the name of the princess in the fairy tale Sleeping Beauty and the many works of art it has inspired. The tale of a cursed princess who slept for one hundred years and was awakened by the kiss of a prince might be considered a modern retelling of the ancient story of Aurora the dawn goddess, whose myths also include stories of a long sleep and an awakening at dawn.

It was not in use in the Middle Ages but came into general use in Europe in the 17th century in Sweden, Spain and the Spanish-speaking world and Italy. It was used in the English-speaking world by the 18th century, but was rare until the 20th century. The name has been increasing in popularity in the United Kingdom and across Europe in recent years. The name entered the list of 100 most popular names for newborn girls in the United Kingdom in 2018. The increase in usage was attributed to a trend for “dreamy space names” among British parents who were influenced by social media. Aurora has also grown in popularity for girls in the United States in recent years. Names taken from mythology and those that had positive meanings or associations also increased in use for children born during the COVID-19 pandemic. It has ranked among the 100 most popular names for newborn girls since 2015 and was the 16th most popular name for American girls in 2024. It also ranked among the top 100 names for newborn girls in Canada, ranking 53rd on that country's popularity chart in 2021. It was also among the 10 most popular names for girls in Brazil in 2023 and in Portugal in 2024. Rory is a modern English nickname for the name.

Aurore is the French form of the name. Aurore was most popular in France in the 1970s and 1980s, when it was among the 100 most popular names for girls. It is still among the 250 most popular names for French girls in the early 2020s.

The variant used in the Russian language is "Авро́ра" (Avrora). While in use before the 20th century, it became more common after the Russian Revolution of 1917, due to the role cruiser Aurora played in the events. In 1924–1930, the name was included into various Soviet calendars, which included the new and often artificially created names promoting the new Soviet realities and encouraging the break with the tradition of using the names in the Synodal Menologia. Diminutives of this name include "Авро́рка" (Avrorka), "А́ва" (Ava), "А́ра" (Ara), and "Ро́ра" (Rora). Avrora is also the Ukrainian form of the name.

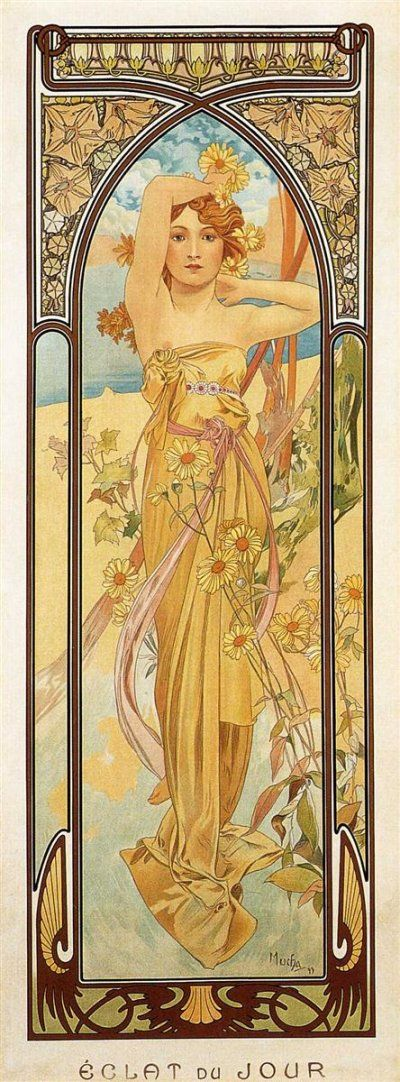
Brightness of Day, 1899, by Alfons Mucha.

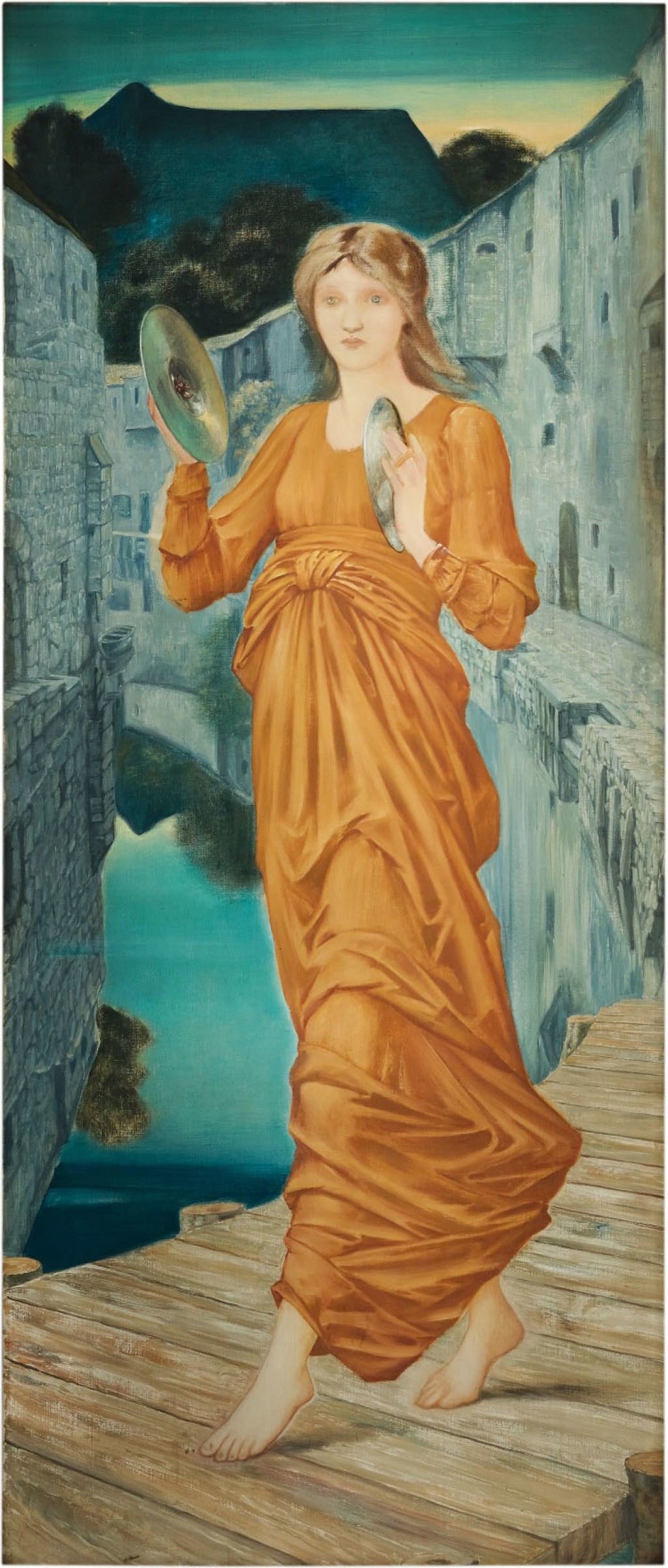
Aurora by Edward Burne-Jones.

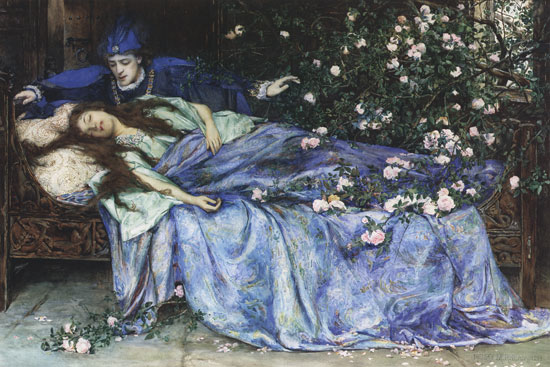
Sleeping Beauty by Henry Meynell Rheam, 1899.

== People ==
- Aurora Aksnes (born 1996), Norwegian singer-songwriter
- Aurora Arias (born 1962), Dominican writer, journalist and astrologer
- Aurora Bautista (1925–2012), a Spanish film actress
- Aurora Browne, Canadian actress and comedian
- Aurora Cáceres (1877–1958), a Peruvian-European writer of the "modernismo" literary movement
- Aurora Carlson (born 1987), a television presenter and China scholar
- Aurora Castillo (1914–1998), a Mexican-American who co-founded the Mothers of East Los Angeles (MELA) organization
- Aurora Chamorro (1954–2020), Catalan swimmer
- Aurora Clavel (1936–2025), a Mexican film and television actress
- Aurora Cornu (1931–2021), a Romanian-born French writer, actress, film director, and translator
- Aurora Cunha (born 1959), a Portuguese long-distance runner
- Aurora Reyes Flores (1908–1985), a Mexican painter and member of the Mexican muralism movement
- Aurora Galli (born 1996), an Italian soccer player
- Aurora Gruescu (1914–2005), Romanian forestry engineer
- Aurora Giovinazzo (born 2002), Italian actress and professional dancer
- Aurora James (born 1984), Canadian creative director, activist, and fashion designer
- Aurora Karamzina née Stjernvall (1808–1902), a Finnish Swede philanthropist and noblewoman
- Aurora Königsmarck (1662–1728), mistress of Augustus the Strong, elector of Saxony and king of Poland
- Aurora Eugenia Latapí (1911–2000), Mexican photographer
- Aurora Liljenroth (1772–1836), Swedish scholar
- Aurora Ljungstedt (1821–1908), Swedish horror writer
- Aurora Mardiganian (1901–1994), Armenian-American author, survivor of the Armenian Genocide.
- Aurora Martinez, director of over 70 Spanish-language action movies
- Aurora Mikalsen, Norwegian soccer goalkeeper
- Aurora Mira (1863–1939), Chilean painter
- Aurora Miranda (1915–2005), a Brazilian entertainer
- Aurora Levins Morales (born 1954), a Puerto Rican writer and poet
- Aurora Nilsson (1894–1972), Swedish writer
- Aurora Estrada Orozco (1918–2011), Mexican American community leader
- Aurora Perrineau (born 1994), American actress and model
- Aurora Pijuan (born 1949), the 1970 titleholder of the Miss International beauty pageant
- Aurora Pinedo (1910–1992), Afro-Bolivian princess regent
- Aurora Quezon (1888–1949), first spouse of a Philippine president to be called First Lady
- Aurora von Qvanten (1816–1907), Swedish writer and artist
- Aurora Ribero (born 2004), Indonesian actress
- Aurora Robles (born 1980), Mexican supermodel
- Aurora Robson (born 1972), Canadian-American artist
- Aurora Rodrigues (born 1952), Portuguese activist and magistrate
- Aurora Rodríguez Carballeira (1879–1955), Spanish woman who murdered her teenage daughter, conceived as a eugenics experiment
- Aurora Snow (born 1981), American pornographic actress
- Aurore Storckenfeldt (1816–1900), Swedish educator
- Aurora Straus, American racecar driver
- Aurora Venturini (1922–2015) an Argentine writer and translator
- Aurora Wilhelmina Koskull (1778–1852), Swedish lady-in-waiting and salonist
- Aurora Ximenes (born 1955), East Timorese politician
- Aurora Pavlovna Demidova (1873–1904), Russian noblewoman and the mother of Prince Paul of Yugoslavia

== Fictional characters ==
- Aurora, a character in Marvel Comics' Alpha Flight
- Aurora, the title character in Anne-Cath. Vestly's Aurora series for children (1966–1972)
- Aurora (Sleeping Beauty), a princess from the Disney film Sleeping Beauty
- Aurora Espinosa, a character from José Zorrilla's play Traidor, inconfeso y mártir
- Aurora Floyd, a character from Mary Elizabeth Braddon's novel of the same name
- Aurora Greenway, a character from Terms of Endearment portrayed by Shirley MacLaine
- Aurora Guillermo-Hidalgo, a character from FPJ's Ang Probinsyano, portrayed by Sharon Cuneta
- Aurora Hawthorne, the title character of Aurora the Magnificent, a novel by Gertrude Hall (wife of William Crary Brownell)
- Aurora Lane (1917), a character in The Broken Gate, a novel by Emerson Hough (adapted into films in 1920 and 1927)
- Aurora Lane (2016), a character from the film Passengers
- Aurora Leigh, a character in Elizabeth Barrett Browning's poem of the same name
- Aurora Sinistra, the astronomy professor in the Harry Potter book series
- Aurora Teagarden, a character created by author Charlaine Harris
- Aurora Thorpe, the title character of Helen Barnes's novel Killing Aurora
- Aurora, the main character of Ubisoft game Child of Light
- Aurora 'Rory' Decker-Morningstar: Lucifer's and Chloe's daughter, a character from the show Lucifer (Season 6) (2021)
- Aurore Cassel, a character in game "Cyberpunk 2077: Phantom Liberty" (2023)
