= Aurore (given name) =

Aurore is a feminine French given name. Notable people with the name include:

- Aurore Auteuil (born 1980), French actress and the oldest daughter of Anne Jousset and Daniel Auteuil
- Aurore Chabot (born 1949), American ceramist
- Aurore Clément (born 1945), French actress
- Aurore Fleury (born 1993), French middle-distance runner
- Aurore Gagnon (1909–1920), Canadian victim of child abuse
- Aurore von Haxthausen (1830–1888), Swedish author, composer, and pianist
- Aurore Jean (born 1985), French cross-country skier
- Aurore Kassambara (born 1979), French athlete who specialises in the hurdles
- Aurore Lalucq (born 1979), French economist and politician
- Aurore Martin (born 1978), Basque politician for the Abertzale Basque separatist party Batasuna
- Aurore Mongel (born 1982), French Olympic and national record holding butterfly swimmer
- Aurore Palmgren (1880–1961), Swedish film actress
- Aurore Trayan (born 1980), French archer

== See also ==
- Aurore (disambiguation)
- Aurora (given name)
