= Rory (disambiguation) =

Rory is a unisex given name of Gaelic origin.

Rory may also refer to:

- Rory (band), an American band
- Røry, stage name of Roxanne Emery, London-based singer-songwriter
- RORY, ICAO airport code for Yoron Airport, Yoronjima, Japan
- Rory, a blue lion who sang and played guitar in the ITV children's series Animal Kwackers

== See also ==
- Raury (born 1996), American musician
- Rori (disambiguation)
