= Lorilee =

Lorilee may refer to:

- Lorilee Craker (born 1968), Canadian-American writer
- Miss Lorilee Lee, a character in the film High School U.S.A.
- "Lorilee", a song first appearing the David Gates album First
  - Note that the versions of the above song have been done by other artists such as the band Bread (also featuring Gates)

== See also ==
- Lorelei
- Lorelei (disambiguation)
- "Lorile" or "Lori Le", a song from The Headies 2008
- Lori Lee
