= Aurore =

Aurore (French for "dawn") may refer to:

- Aurore-class submarine, a type of coastal submarines of the French Navy
- Aurore (2005 film), a Quebec movie based on Aurore Gagnon's life
- Aurore (2017 film), a French movie drama-comedy, also known as I Got Life!
- Aurore (book), a 2008 French edition of the 1999 children's book Laura by Binette Schroeder
- Aurore (given name)
- Aurore (grape), a grape varietal
- Aurore Sarl, a French aircraft manufacturer
- Aurore (slave ship), a cargo slave ship which brought the first African slaves to Louisiana in 1719 from Senegambia
- French corvette Aurore (1767), a snow commissioned by the French Navy for scientific purposes, which performed the first measurement of longitude using a marine chronometer
- L'Aurore, a literary, liberal, and socialist newspaper published in Paris, France, from 1897 to 1914
- L'Aurore (1944 newspaper), a news daily published in Paris, France, from 1944 to 1985
- L'Aurore boréale, a Canadian bi-weekly newspaper, published in Whitehorse, Yukon
- La Petite Aurore: l'enfant martyre (film), a 1952 Quebec movie based on the story of the life of Aurore Gagnon
- Tour Aurore, a 100-metre, 29-story office building in the La Defense central business district
- USS Aurore II (SP-460), a United States Navy patrol vessel in commission from 1917 to 1919
- Villa Aurore, a novel written in French by French author and Nobel laureate J. M. G. Le Clézio

== See also ==
- Aurore and Aimée, a French literary fairy tale written by Jeanne-Marie Le Prince de Beaumont
- Auror, a fictional category of magicians coordinated by Auror Office of Ministry of Magic in Harry Potter tales
- Aurora (disambiguation)
- French ship Aurore, a list of French Navy ships bearing the name
