= Lorelei (comics) =

Lorelei, in comics, may refer to:

- Lorelei (Asgardian), a supporting character appearing mostly in The Mighty Thor and Marvel's Agents of S.H.I.E.L.D.
- Lorelei (Mutate), a mutant supervillain
- Lorelei Travis, a minor mutant character appearing in the various titles surrounding the X-Men
- Mantis (Marvel Comics), who briefly took the name Lorelei as revealed in the Official Handbook of the Marvel Universe: Avengers 2005

== See also ==
- Lorelei (disambiguation)
