= Lithuanian Lands Militia =

- Active: 1780s–1794
- Country: Grand Duchy of Lithuania
- Type: Infantry

The Lithuanian Lands Militia (Polish: Milicja Skarbu W. Ks. Litewskiego) was a military unit of the Grand Duchy of Lithuania.

== History ==
The unit was stationed in Grodno.

== Uniform ==
The militia was dressed in a bright poppy red uniform with blue facings and gold buttons.

== Commanders ==
No.	Portrait	Commander	Took office	Left office	Time in office
1	Wojniłłowicz	Rotmistrz; Wojniłłowicz	1780	1783	3 years, 0 days
2	Tadeusz Suchodolec	Rotmistrz; Tadeusz Suchodolec	17 November 1783	1793	9 years, 45 days
2	Jan Karbowski	Rotmistrz; Jan Karbowski	1793	1794	1 year, 0 days

== Bibliography ==
=== References ===
- Gembarzewski, Bronisław (1925). Rodowody pułków polskich i oddziałów równorzędnych od r. 1717 do r. 1831. Warsaw.
- Benda, Jan (1936). "Zasadnicze barwy mundurów wojska Obojga Narodów". Broń I Barwa. 9.
- Rospond, Vincent W. (2013). Commonwealth Armies of the Partitions 1770–1794. Great Britain: Osprey Publishing. ISBN 978-1-84908855-8.
