= Facing colour =

Tailoring technique

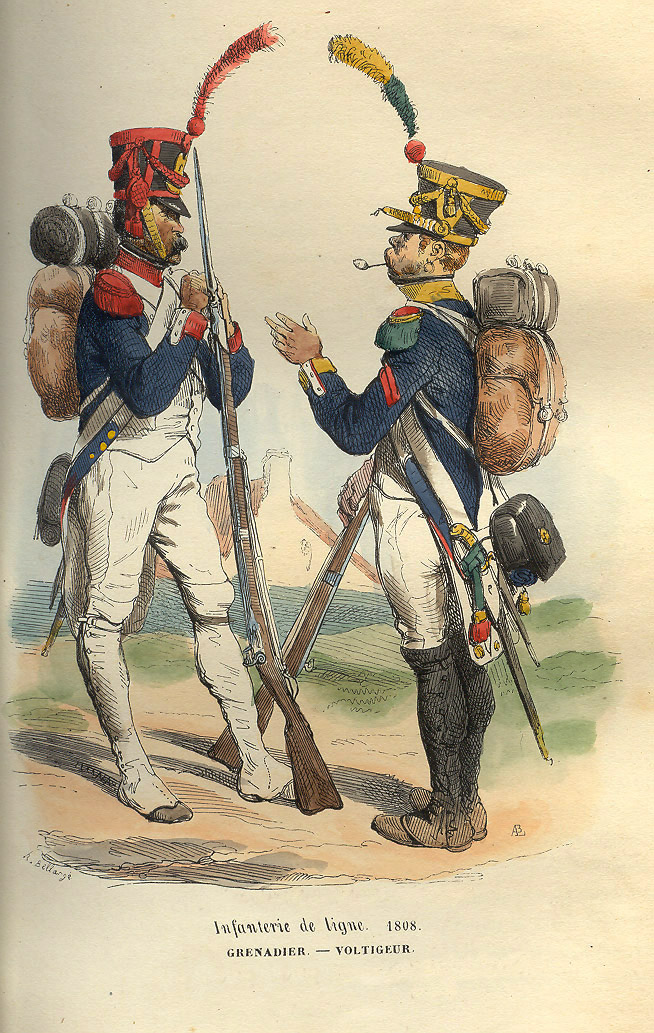
A grenadier and voltigeur of the French Imperial Army in 1808 with red and yellow facings

A facing colour, also known as facings, is a common tailoring technique for European military uniforms where the visible inside lining of a standard military jacket, coat or tunic is of a different colour to that of the garment itself. The jacket lining evolved to be of different coloured material, then of specific hues. Accordingly, when the material was turned back on itself: the cuffs, lapels and tails of the jacket exposed the contrasting colours of the lining or facings, enabling ready visual distinction of different units: regiments, divisions or battalions each with their own specific and prominent colours. The use of distinctive facings for individual regiments was at its most popular in 18th century armies, but standardisation within infantry branches became more common during and after the Napoleonic Wars.

== France ==
During the Ancien Régime, there were many different facing colours (notably various shades of blue, red, yellow, green and black) on the standard grey-white uniforms of the French line infantry. Examples included blue for the Régiment du Languedoc, red for the Régiment du Béarn etc. The initiative in fixing or changing facing colours was largely left to individual colonels, who in effect had ownership of their regiments. This tendency towards variegated facings reached its height in the "Dress Regulation Facings for the Army" of 31 May 1776 when unusual shades such as silver-grey, aurore, and "red speckled with white" were added to the by-then white uniforms of the French infantry. In 1791 an attempt was made to rationalize facings by giving groupings of up to six regiments a single colour, relying on secondary features such as piping or button patterns to distinguish separate units.

The rise of mass conscript armies during and following the Napoleonic Wars led to increasing standardisation of facing colours, for reasons both of economy and supply efficiency. Thus, for example, the French line fusiliers and grenadiers of the early 19th century had red facings, with only numbers to distinguish one regiment from another. The voltigeurs had yellow or/and green facings. From 1854 on red facings became universal for all of the line infantry who made up the bulk of the French metropolitan Army, although the Chasseurs, who constituted a separate branch, retained yellow facings as a special distinction.

== United Kingdom ==
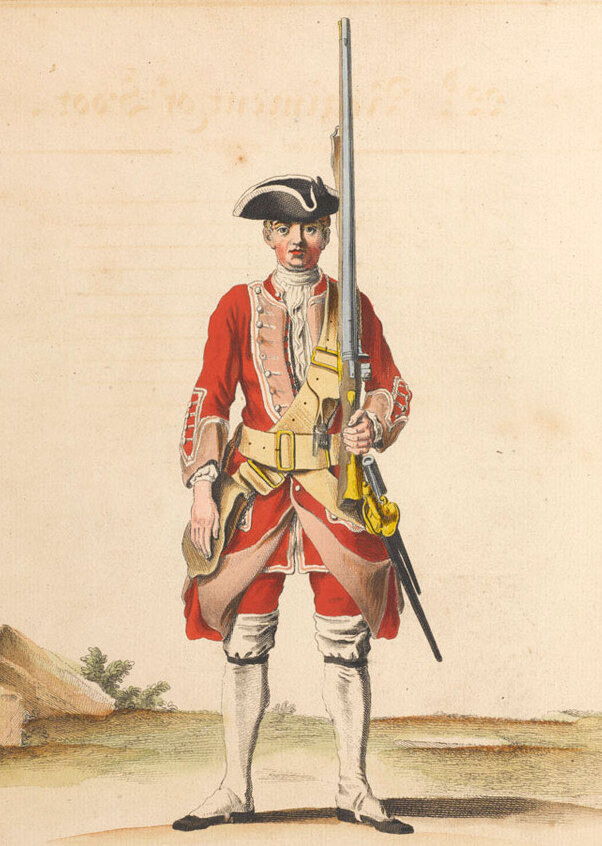
c. 1742 engraving of a 22nd Foot private with pink facings

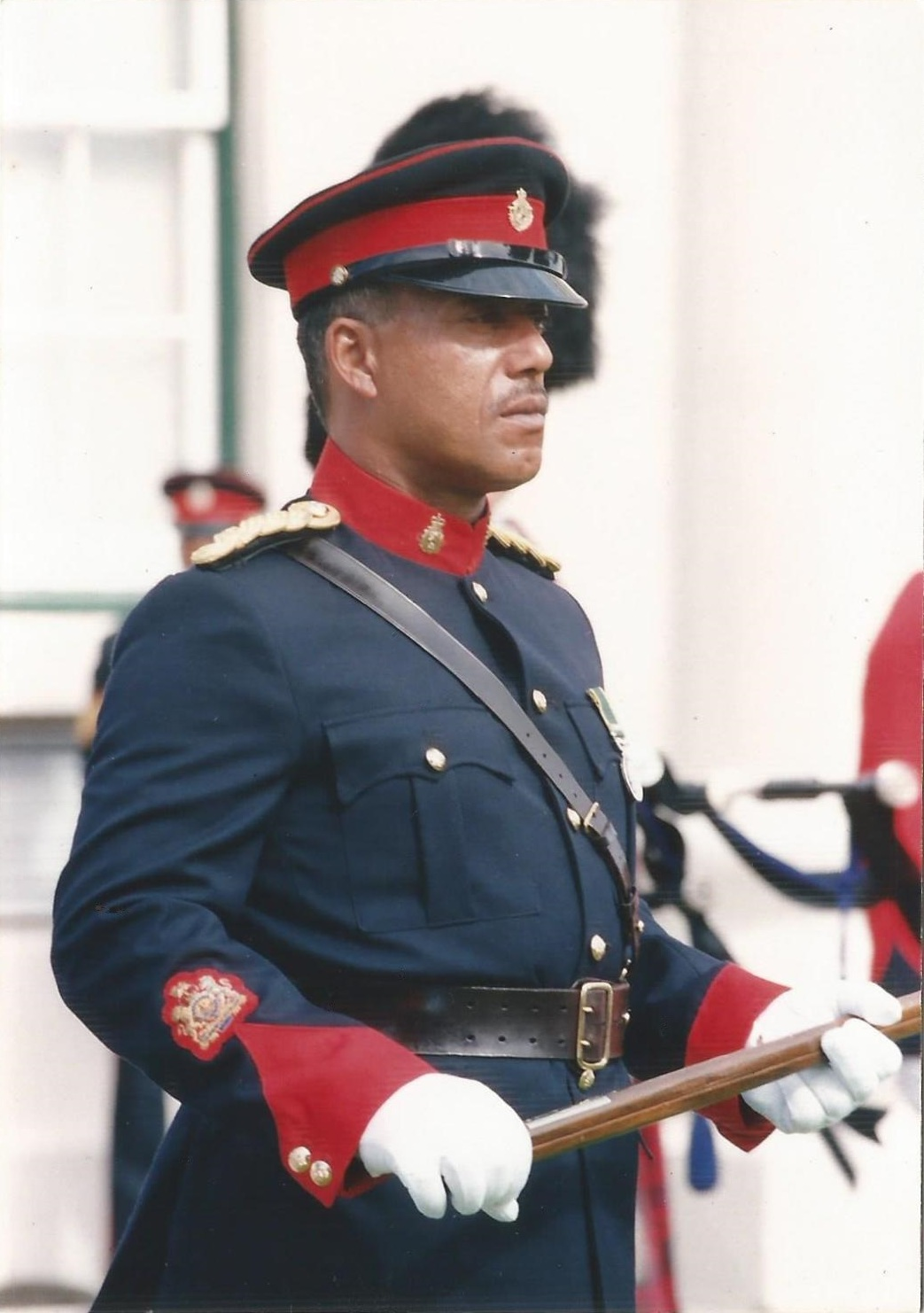
A regimental sergeant major of the Royal Bermuda Regiment in 1992 with red facings

The red coats worn by British infantrymen from the mid-17th century onwards made it difficult to distinguish between units engaged in battle. The use of colour assisted soldiers in rallying on a common point, and each regiment had a flag, or colour, in a specific shade so as to be easily distinguished. The lining of uniform jackets came to be made from material of the same regimental colours, and turning back the material at the cuffs, lapels and tails of the jacket exposed the lining, or "facing". Most European armies adopted facings during the late 17th and early 18th centuries. By the 19th century, for reasons of economy, coat linings had become a universal white or black and distinctive regimental facings were reduced to collars and cuffs sewn on to the basic garment.

The tradition of associating particular colours with specific regiments continued into the 20th century, even when the general use of red tunics ceased in favor of khaki. Facings remained a part of the ceremonial uniforms retained by Household troops, bandsmen, officers and other limited categories after World War I. The practice was also adopted by Commonwealth military units that adopted dress distinctions from affiliated units of the British Army.

In 1881 an attempt was made, as an economy measure, to standardise facing colours for British infantry regiments (other than the four rifle regiments who wore dark green uniforms) according to the following system:

- Guards and "Royal" Regiments (i.e. those with "Royal", "King's", or "Queen's" in the title) – dark blue
- English and Welsh Regiments – white
- Scots Regiments – yellow
- Irish Regiments – green. (In fact this meant only the Connaught Rangers. All other Irish Regiments were "Royal" and so had dark blue facings.)

While this standardisation made the manufacturing and replacement of uniforms simpler, it proved unpopular amongst the army at large. Some regiments (such as the Buffs and Green Howards) derived their names or nicknames from the colour of their facings and the Duke of Wellington's Regiment (who had red facings) lost their claim to be the only truly red-coated regiment in the British Army.

So widespread was opposition to the order, and so frequent the requests for special exceptions to be made, that the scheme in its original form was finally dropped and the historic colours were re-instated in a number of regiments, until full dress for the Army as a whole finally vanished with the coming of war in 1914. While many regiments did continue with their new 1881 facings, instances where reversion to traditional colours was approved included:

- the Northumberland Fusiliers (white to Gosling green)
- the Manchester Regiment (white to Lincoln green)
- the Norfolk Regiment (white to yellow)
- the Essex Regiment (white to 'Pompadour Purple')
- the Devonshire Regiment (white to Lincoln green)
- the Highland Light Infantry (yellow to buff)
- the Seaforth Highlanders (yellow to buff)
- the Prince of Wales's Own Yorkshire Regiment (white to grass green)
- the Duke of Wellington's Regiment (white to scarlet)
- the Duke of Edinburgh's Wiltshire Regiment (white to buff)
- the Suffolk Regiment (white to yellow)
- the Durham Light Infantry (white to dark green)
- the Buffs (white to buff)

Even after World War I this tendency to revert to historic facings continued, although by that time the scarlet uniforms were normally worn only by regimental bands and by officers in mess and levee dress. As examples, the Norfolk Regiment regained its former yellow facings in 1925 and the North Staffordshire Regiment its pre-1881 black facings in 1937.

In the Royal Artillery and various supporting corps, full dress tunics that were worn up until 1914 were actually dark blue, sometimes with facings in other colours, including red for the artillery. Today, the Royal Bermuda Regiment, a 1965 amalgam of the Bermuda Militia Artillery (part of the Royal Regiment of Artillery) and the Bermuda Rifles wears dark blue No. 1 Dress with red facings, recalling its Royal Artillery heritage, while the drummers of its band wear red tunics with black facings (recalling the black facings, buttons and equipment worn by rifle units, which had mostly worn rifle green tunics).

In the early twentieth century, these colours were defined by the now defunct British Colour Council.

== Other armies ==
Austrian Deutschmeister troops in 1804 with blue facings

The practice of using different facing colours to distinguish individual regiments had been widespread in European armies in the 18th century when such decisions were largely left to commanding officers and uniforms were made by individual contractors rather than in centralised government clothing factories.

By the second half of the nineteenth century, the Dutch, Spanish, Swiss, Belgian, Japanese, Portuguese, Italian, Romanian, Swedish, Chilean, Mexican, Greek and Turkish armies had come to follow French standardised arrangements, although in some cases variety might still be used to denote different types of infantry (grenadiers, fusiliers, rifles, light infantry etc.) within a particular army, each with its own uniform and facings. As a general rule, cavalry uniforms tended to be more varied, and it was not uncommon for each mounted regiment to retain its own facing colours up to 1914. Artillery, engineers and support corps normally had a single branch colour, although exceptionally each regiment of Swedish artillery had its own facing colour until 1910.

The United States regular army after the American Civil War adopted a universal dark and light blue uniform under which each regiment was distinguished only by numbers and other insignia, plus branch colors. The latter were yellow for Cavalry, red for Artillery and white (later light blue) for infantry. Combinations of colours such as scarlet piped with white for Engineers, orange piped with white for the Signal Corps and black piped with scarlet for Ordnance personnel gave wide scope for adding distinctive branch facings as the Army became more technical and diverse. This system continued in general use until blue uniforms ceased to be general issue in 1917, and survives in a limited form in modern blue mess and dress uniforms.

Notable exceptions to such standardisation within branches were the British Army (as noted above) and the Austro-Hungarian one. As late as World War I the latter employed 28 different colours, including 10 different shades of red, for its infantry facings.

In the very large Imperial German and Russian armies infantry facing colours were often allocated according to the position that a particular regiment held in the order of battle – that is within a brigade, division or corps. As an example, amongst the Russian line infantry, the two brigades within each division were distinguished by red or blue shoulder straps; while the four regiments within each division wore red, blue, white or green collar patches and cap bands respectively.
