= Lorelei (disambiguation) =

The Lorelei is a rock in the Rhine River, the subject of numerous legends, poems, and songs about maritime disaster.

Lorelei, Loralei, Loreley, Lorelai, or Lorilei may also refer to:

== Film and stage ==
- The Lorelei (1927 film), a German silent film
- Lorelei (musical), a 1974 revision of Gentlemen Prefer Blondes
- Lorilei, a 2005 play by Tom Wright
- Lorelei: The Witch of the Pacific Ocean, a 2005 Japanese film
- Lorelei, a character in the 2015 film Victor Frankenstein
- Lorelei (film), a 2020 American drama film

== Characters ==
- Lorelei, a dog character from The Dogs of Babel

== Comics ==
- Lorelei (Asgardian), a character appearing mostly in The Mighty Thor and on Marvel's Agents of S.H.I.E.L.D.
- Mantis (Marvel Comics), who briefly took the name Lorelei
- Lorelei (Mutate), a character whose first appearance was in X-Men #63
- Lorelei Travis, a character in X-Men comics

== Literature ==
- Lorelei, a 1935 romance novel by Ionel Teodoreanu
- "Die Lore-Ley", an 1824 poem by Heinrich Heine, set to music by Friedrich Silcher in 1837
- "Lorelei", a poem by Sylvia Plath

== Music ==
=== Artists ===
- Lorelei (band), a dark rock band from Pittsburgh

=== Classical ===
- Loreley (opera), an 1890 opera by Alfredo Catalani
- Die Loreley (Bruch), an 1862 opera
- "Die Lorelei", an 1837 German folk song by Friedrich Silcher
- "Lorelei", an 1843 Lied by Clara Schumann
- "Die Loreley", an 1856 song by Franz Liszt
- "Loreley-Rhein-Klänge", Op. 154 waltz by Johann Strauss I
- Loreley (opera), a piece begun by Felix Mendelssohn but left uncompleted at his death in 1847

=== Songs ===
- "Lorelei" (George Gershwin song) (1933)
- "Lorelei" (Styx song) (1976)
- "Loreley", a 2003 song by Blackmore's Night from Ghost of a Rose
- "Lorelei", a 2018 song by Clutch from Book of Bad Decisions
- "Lorelei", a 1984 song by Cocteau Twins from Treasure
- "Lorelei", a 2003 song by Comeback Kid from Turn It Around
- "Lorelei", a 1993 song by Corpus Delicti from Twilight
- "Lorelei", a 2019 song by DIIV from Deceiver
- "Lorelei", a 1960 song by Lonnie Donegan
- "Lorelei", a 1984 song by The Explorers from The Explorers
- "Lorelai", a 2011 song by Fleet Foxes from Helplessness Blues
- "Laurelei", a 1995 song by Lisa Gerrard from The Mirror Pool
- "Lorelei", a 1983 song by Nina Hagen from Angstlos
- "Loreley", a 1981 song by Dschinghis Khan
- "Lorelei", a 2013 song by Steve Kilbey and Martin Kennedy from You Are Everything
- "Loreley (The Lovers)", a 2012 song by In Hearts Wake from Divination
- "Lorelei", a 2016 track by Ladies' Code from STRANG3R
- "Loreley", a 1998 song by L'Arc-en-Ciel from Heart
- "Loreley", a 2018 song by Lord of the Lost from Thornstar
- "Black Forest (Lorelei)", a 2005 song by Mercury Rev from The Secret Migration
- "Lorelei", a 1989 song by the Pogues from Peace and Love
- "Lorelei", a 2010 song by Scorpions from Sting in the Tail
- "Lorelei", a 1998 song by Theatre of Tragedy from Aégis
- "Lorelei", a 1981 song by Tom Tom Club from Tom Tom Club
- "Lorelei", a 1976 song by Wishbone Ash from New England
- "Lorelei", the title track for the character named Ilyasviel from the visual novel Fate/stay night
- "Lorelei", a 1985 song by Alan Tam

== Places ==
- Lorelei, Edmonton, a neighbourhood in Edmonton, Alberta, Canada
- Loreley (Verbandsgemeinde), a Verbandsgemeinde ("collective municipality") in Rhineland-Palatinate, Germany
- Loralai District, Balochistan, Pakistan
  - Loralai, the principal city of Loralai District

== Video games ==
- Lorelei, a character from the Borderlands 3 video game
- Lorelai, a sequel to The Cat Lady
- Order of Lorelei, a fictional military-religious organization in Tales of the Abyss
- Lorelai, a character from Vainglory
- Lorelei and the Laser Eyes, a 2024 video game

== Other uses ==
- Lorelei (name), a feminine given name
- 165 Loreley, an asteroid discovered by C. H. F. Peters in 1876
- María Luisa Garza (1887–1980), a Mexican writer who wrote under the pen name Lorelay

== See also ==
- Loreleia, a mushroom genus
- Mermaid
- Siren (mythology)
