= Rori =

Rori may refer to:

== People ==
- Rori, an abbreviation for the given name Aurora
- Aurora "Rori" Quattrocchi, (b. 1943) an Italian television, stage and film actress
- Rori Donaghy (b. 1986), human rights activist
- Rori Harmon, (b. 2003), an American college basketball player for the Texas Longhorns
- Charanjeet Singh Rori, (b. 1969), Indian politician
- Jai Krishan Singh Rouri, (b. 1983), is Deputy speaker of Punjab Assembly
- Sangu language (Tanzania), Sangu (also called Kisangu, Kisango, Kirori, Eshisango, Rori, and Sango) is a language spoken in Tanzania
- Sangu people, at times called Rori (People of the Steppes)

== Places ==
- Rori, a fictional moon from the Star Wars franchise that orbits Naboo
- Rori Assembly constituency was an assembly constituency in the India state of Haryana
- Khor Rori is a bar-built estuary at the mouth of Wādī Darbāt
- Pinda Rori is a village in Batala in Gurdaspur district of Punjab State, India

== See also ==
- Ahmaad Rorie, (b. 1996) is an American basketball player for Basketball Löwen Braunschweig of the Basketball Bundesliga
- Gothic fashion, in Japanese, Gothic Lolita, sometimes shortened to gosu rori
- Raury (born 1996), American musician
- Rohri, a city in Pakistan
- Rorikon, or Lolicon, Japanese slang for "Lolita complex"
- Rory (disambiguation)
