= Aurore Chabot =

American ceramist

- Born: 1949 (age 76–77); New Hampshire
- Known for: Ceramic art

Aurore Chabot (born 1949) is an American ceramist who creates sculptures, wheel-thrown pieces using porcelain and terra cotta, and ceramic tile murals.

== Early life and education ==
Chabot was born in 1949 in Nashua, New Hampshire, and grew up in Wilton, New Hampshire, in a large family, where she was a middle child. She graduated from Wilton High School in 1967 and received her bachelor's degree in fine arts from the Pratt Institute in 1971. She studied with Regis Brodie at Skidmore College in 1974, completing a Raku program. She then earned a master of fine arts degree from the University of Colorado Boulder in 1981.

== Career ==
She began her post college work as a ceramicist in a studio on the Bowery, in New York City, which she shared with Peggy DuPont. In 1974 she received a grant from the New York State Council on the Arts, one of many awards she subsequently received. The Council on the Arts grant allowed her to set up a ceramics studio in Broadalbin, New York. She had moved to Broadalbin, New York with her then husband, Douglas Kabat (1946-), who she separated from in ~1975 and divorced in ~1978.

She has taught at the University of Vermont, and since 1988 has been a professor at the University of Arizona, where she headed the ceramics program. She has long been active with the National Council on Education for the Ceramic Arts, serving as Director at Large from 1999 until 2001 and Publications Director from 2001 until 2004 and being appointed to the Nominations Committee for Fall 2012 and Spring 2013. She has successfully finished two significant national public art projects, and has been invited to several visiting artist programs. Chabot received a Governor's Arts Award in 1990, and has exhibited widely during her career, winning numerous honors and awards including a pair of grants from the National Endowment for the Arts. Her artwork has been featured in over a hundred national and international exhibitions, as well as various books and periodicals.
