= Aurora Robles =

Mexican fashion model (born 1980)

- Born: 1980 (age 45–46); Matamoros, Tamaulipas, Mexico
- Modeling information
- Height: 5 ft 10 in (1.78 m)
- Hair color: Black
- Eye color: Brown

Aurora Robles (born 1980 in Matamoros, Tamaulipas, Mexico) is a Mexican fashion model.

Robles has appeared in many top quality fashion shows in Mexico and Europe. She has been featured on the front pages of the April 2000 and December 2000 issues of the magazine Max, in Germany, the front page of the May 2002 issue of GQ in Germany, and the front page of the July/August 2000 issue of Gear.

== Trivia ==
She has a tattoo of an Aztec symbol on her lower back.
