= Aurore Martin =

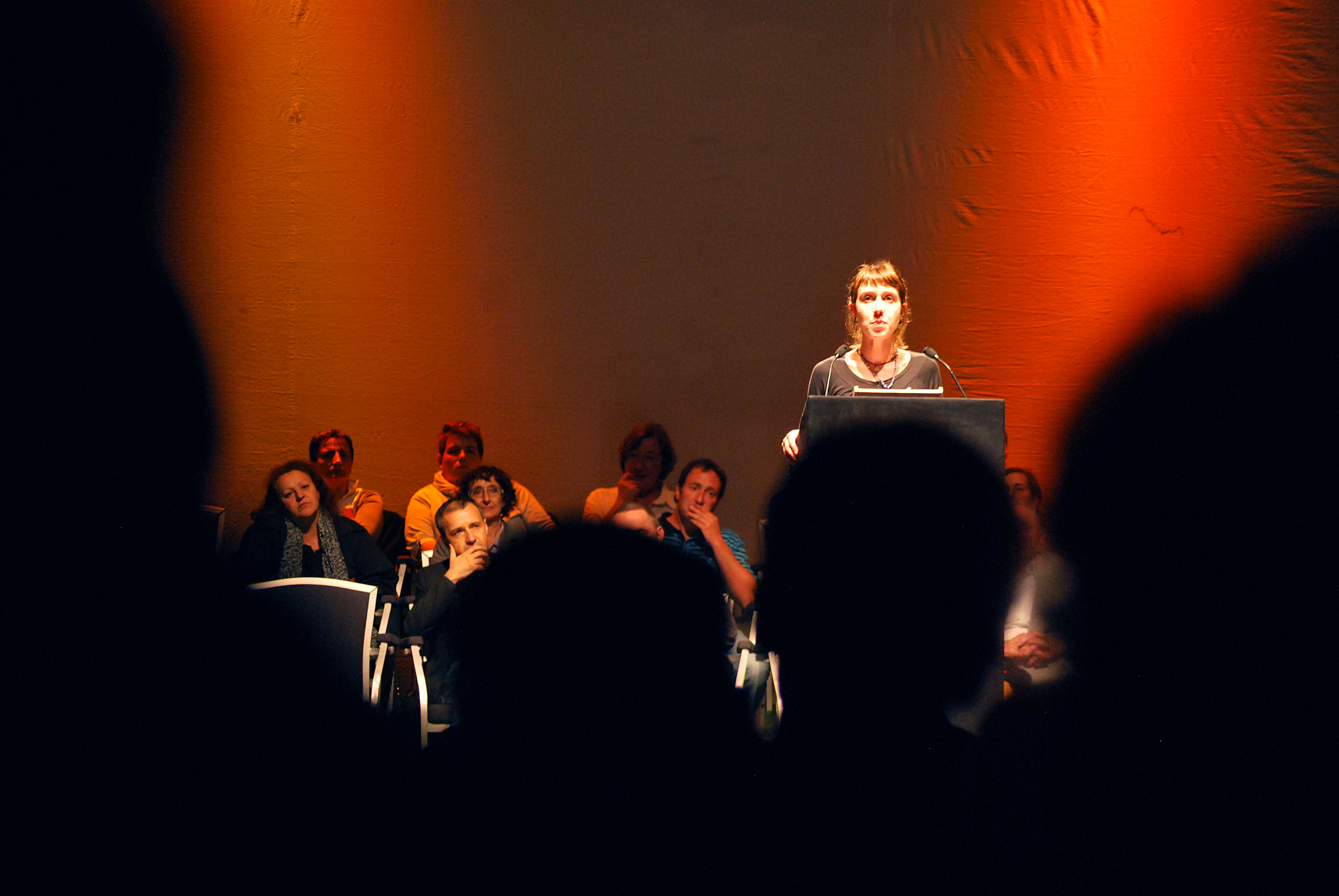
- Aurore Martin

Member of Batasuna

Personal details
- Born: Oloron-Sainte-Marie, Bearn
- Party: Batasuna

Aurore Martin (born in 1978) is a Basque politician of French citizenship for the Abertzale Basque separatist party Batasuna.

Aurore Martin is a member of Batasuna, a party which is illegal in Spain, but legal as a cultural association in France. The Spanish State asked the French state to extradite her, and the Court of Pau (France) agreed to do so.

In December 2010 she publicly declared she was going into hiding since she believed the French police were looking for her. After hiding for six months, on May 18, 2011, during a public event to show support for her position (which included both national and international political leaders), she stated that she would return to political life, even though she knew the French police would surely arrest and expedite her to Spain where she could face 12 years imprisonment for speaking out during a political rally in 2003.

On June 21, 2011, the French police attempted to arrest Aurore Martin in Bayonne. When they attempted to pull her out of her sister's apartment, people surrounded Aurore and managed to separate her from the police and bring her across the river to St. André square. Subsequently, Aurore Martin spent several hours surrounded by over 200 people protecting her. The police surrounded the square but later left. Aurore Martin would be extradited on the basis of her political work with Batasuna which is not banned by the French state.

French Government extradited Martin to Madrid. She is the first French citizen extradited to another state, to be judged there.
