= Aurora Carlson =

- Born: September 2, 1987 (age 38); London, England, United Kingdom
- Education: University of Wisconsin–Madison, B.A.; Johns Hopkins University-Paul H. Nitze School of Advanced International Studies (SAIS), M.A.

Aurora Carlson (born 1987, London) is a television presenter and China scholar. She received a B.A. in Chinese and East Asian Studies from the University of Wisconsin-Madison, and a M.A. from Johns Hopkins University.

In 2007, Aurora Carlson was hired as the youngest-ever PRC Foreign Expert to China Central Television (CCTV). She hosted a weekly series called Rediscovering China, a documentary-style program exploring socio-economic changes throughout the country. The show was filmed on-location at rural and urban sites across mainland China. She conducted interviews in Mandarin Chinese, followed by English commentary. She also wrote stories for CCTV News.

Other relevant experience includes property management consulting at China National Offshore Oil Company (CNOOC) and op-ed journalism at China Daily. As of 2015, Carlson was the head of Asia Investor Relations at OurCrowd.

Carlson hosted a Mandarin Chinese language series broadcast, "Easy Chinese", daily during the 2008 Beijing Olympic Games. The 24-part series is due to be published into a book, by Popular Science Press (China).
