= French ship Aurore =

Twenty-two ships of the French Navy have borne the name Aurore ("Aurora"):

== Ships named Aurore ==
- Sibylle (1666), a 6-gun frigate, bore the name Aurore during her career
- Aurore (1670), a 10-gun frigate
- Aurore (1689), a 20-gun frigate
- Aurore (1697), a 24-gun frigate
- Aurore (1699), a 44-gun ship of the line
- Aurore (1725), a frigate
- Aurore (1735), a ship of the line
- Aurore (1745), a 50-gun frigate
- Aurore (1767), a 6-gun yacht, also known as Petite Aurore
- Aurore (1768), a 34-gun frigate
- Aurore (1779), a fluyt
- Aurore (1786), a 14-gun storeship
- Artémise (1794), a 32-gun Magicienne-class frigate, bore the name Aurore during her career
- Aurore (1799), a 16-gun Mutine-class corvette. The British Royal Navy captured her in 1799 and took her into service as HMS Charwell
- Aurore (1803), a schooner
- Aurore (1807), a schooner
- Aurore (1810), a 32-gun frigate captured from Holland
- Aurore (1828), a sloop
- Adrienne (1809), a 46-gun frigate, bore the name Aurore during her career
- Aurore (1860), a schooner
- Aurore (1939), an auxiliary patrol boat
- Aurore (Q192), a submarine launched in 1939, lead ship of her class.

== See also ==
- Aurore-class submarine
- HMS Aurora

== Notes and references ==
=== Bibliography ===
- Roche, Jean-Michel (2005a). Dictionnaire des bâtiments de la flotte de guerre française de Colbert à nos jours. Vol. 1. Group Retozel-Maury Millau. pp. 372–373. ISBN 978-2-9525917-0-6. OCLC 165892922.
- Roche, Jean-Michel (2005b). Dictionnaire des bâtiments de la flotte de guerre française de Colbert à nos jours. Vol. 2. Group Retozel-Maury Millau. p. 250. ISBN 978-2-9525917-0-6. OCLC 165892922.
