= Rory Jones =

South African soccer player

Personal information
- Date of birth: 1955 (age 70–71)
- Place of birth: South Africa
- Position: Left winger

Senior career*
Years	Team	Apps	(Gls)
1973–1974	Berea Park		
1975–1976	Highlands Park		
1977–?	Pretoria Callies		

International career
1978	South Africa national team		
- * Club domestic league appearances and goals

Rory Jones (born 1955) is a South African former soccer player. He was a professional soccer player for Berea Park 1973 and 1974, and Highlands Park 1975 and 1976 in the National Football League. In 1977, he joined Pretoria Callies in the newly formed multi-racial National Professional Soccer League and one of the first "White" players to sign for and play for a "Black" team at The Super Stadium, (now named after his teammate, Macro "Masterpieces" Moripe) in Attridgeville Township, west of Pretoria. He was also known as "Sikiza", someone with exceptional talent who could dribble the ball past all his opponents. He spent six weeks training and playing in the United Kingdom with Wolverhampton Wanderers, Arsenal and Chelsea in 1971. He was described by Highlands Park Manager Joe Frickleton as the best left wing in South Africa. He was named in the South Africa national team in 1978 against Rhodesia, by Joe Frickleton.
