= Aurora Eugenia Latapí =

Mexican photographer (1911–2000)

Aurora Eugenia Latapí (México, 1911–2000) was a Mexican photographer, and the first woman to enter the Club Fotográfico de México. Her work has been associated with an avant-garde language that drew apart from the Pictorialist tradition that was in vogue at the beginning of the 20th century, due to the capture of geometric forms, the presence of foreground elements, and the process of overprinting.

== Artistic trajectory ==
Aurora Eugenia Latapí was born in Mexico, in 1911.

In 1926, when she was fifteen years old, she returned from a trip in Europe with a camera that had been given to her by her mother, Aurora Estévez de Latapí. Three years later, she began her career as a photographer. In an interview published in Alquimia magazine in the year 2000, she explains she began taking photographs as a hobby: “I enjoyed taking pictures, and since my mother liked it, I took them.” For this reason, she started studying photography at the American Photo Supply Co and at the industrial school Malina Xóchit. A few years later, she was admitted at the Academy of San Carlos, where she studied with the renowned Mexican photographer Agustín Jiménez.

In December 1929 she participated in the group show Guillermo Toussaint y 11 fotógrafos mexicanos en la Galería de Arte Mexicano at the National Theater (now Palacio de Bellas Artes) in Mexico City. The exhibit was organized by Carlos Mérida and Carlos Orozco Romero, and it featured works by sculptor Guillermo Toussaint, photographers Manuel Álvarez Bravo, Hugo Brehme, Rafael García, Librado García Smart, Agustín Jiménez, Ricardo Mantel, Luis Márquez, Juan Ocón and Roberto Turnbull, as well as Aurora Eugenia and her mother Aurora Latapí. Criticism of the show was positive and, according to José Antonio Rodríguez, this exhibition allowed Latapí to formally enter the Mexican photography scene, which was still ruled by the already weak Pictorialist style. In November 1931, during her first year at San Carlos, she showed 50 pictures in the Exposición Fotográfica Jiménez-Latapí at Galería Excélsior, along with Agustín Jiménez. Latapí exhibited still lifes portraying organic materials or industrial objects, which allowed her to experiment with different mechanical processes such as overprinting negatives, and which she would push toward abstraction. In this second exhibition, her work spoke an avant-garde language that reflected, according to José Antonio Rodríguez, a more “mature” approach toward photography.

On this occasion, the critics’ opinion was divided. On the one hand, Latapí's and Jiménez's works were praised by some for “accurately expressing the aesthetic inquiries of our time”. On the other hand, an anonymous review was printed in Helios magazine (published by the Asociación de Fotógrafos de México, where the most influential Pictorialist photographers of Mexico came together), in which both photographers were accused of imitating the work of Edward Weston and Tina Modotti. It was common then, for Mexico-based photographers, like Weston and Modotti, but also like Latapí, Agustín Jiménez, and Lola and Manuel Álvarez Bravo to capture aspects of Mexican culture and landscape, as well as valuing high contrasts and compositional rhythms in photography, so it was frequent to find these similarities in photos taken by many artists in Mexico during those years.

In December 1931, La Tolteca, a Mexican cement company, and the newspaper Excélsior, organized a painting, drawing and photography contest, around the topic of the recently built and inaugurated cement factory in Mexico City's area of Mixcoac. The winning works were to be exhibited at the National Theater in an exhibition called La Tolteca. Aurora Eugenia Latapí was awarded fourth place with the picture Chalchiuhtlanetzin (the first place was won by Manuel Álvarez Bravo; Agustín Jiménez won second; and third was awarded to Lola Álvarez Bravo). Once again, the jury's decision, which Diego Rivera was part of, was widely criticized in Helios magazine by members of the Asociación de Fotógrafos de México. Latapí's series “La Tolteca” (1931) presents different views of the cement factory. Many of the photos show architectural structures covered with cement: a great wall with attached cylinders, grids, chimneys, towers; all of which contrast with metallic scaffolds, staircases and pipes. This large industrial landscape is deprived of human form, so when one of the untitled photos shows someone climbing a scaffold tower in front of an architectural structure with three concrete cylinders and doors in the lower part, it becomes exceptional. As in other photographs by Latapí, the framing in the pictures of this series is mostly diagonal, and the closely captured large structures tend to exceed the limits of the frame. In this sense, and also due to the contrast between shadows and highlights, these compositions tend toward geometric abstraction. After this show, Latapí's work was featured in many magazines, like Jueves de Excélsior, Revista de revistas and Nuestro México, but according to José Antonio Rodríguez, it disappeared from the public sphere by the mid-1930s. Emma Cecilia García Krinsky, nonetheless, points out that the photographs Latapí took between the 1930s and 40s were very important for avant-garde photography in Mexico.

In 1950, she was the first woman to become a member of the Club Fotográfico de México: “I was sent out to develop, to do anything because they didn't think I could do photography. So I took my photos to the right person, they liked it, and came up with something that they should not have done, put my photos in different classes [categories], to top it off I won a price in all of them. That's why the men, as I was the first woman to enter, made me see my luck”. By the end of that year, Latapí founded the Salón Femenil (the Women Salon) of the Club Fotográfico de México, of which she would later become president.

During the 1950s and 60s, Latapí opened the commercial photographic studio “Foto Cui” in the Polanco neighbourhood, in Mexico City.

In 1961 she received an honorable mention in the National Photography Contest “Así es México”, and in 1963 she had her last solo show in the same contest.

After that and due to her husband's business activity she moved to the United States, but later returned to Mexico City where she died September 4, 2000.

== Work ==
In most of her photographs, Latapí used diagonal frames that make the captured objects and buildings exit the compositional space. The general composition of most of her photos is guided by strong, multiple and/or parallel diagonal axis that, along with shadows and highlights, provide the pictures with movement and depth. Diagonal frames, close-ups, rhythm and contrasts between shadows and highlights, also create geometric patterns that render some of the images abstract.

Her preferred technique was gelatin silver. In her photos, objects like corncobs and zucchini, Mexican toys like trompos and maracas, palm woven objects, or industrial buildings, among others, become the main subject. Textures and contrasts between them is also important: the detail of a corn leaf embracing the grains of its cob (Mazorcas or Elotes, 1931); the smooth wooden finish of maracas on top of a palm woven petate (Guajes, ca. 1940); or the skin of a hand holding a large metallic nail (Obrero, 1931).

Many of her works are untitled, but some of the most representative titles are:

- Series “La Tolteca”, 1931.
- Chalchiuhtlanetzin, 1931.
- Mazorcas or elotes, 1931.
- Obrero, 1931.
- Trompos, 1931.
- Guajes, ca. 1940.
- Sopladores, ca. 1940.

== Exhibitions ==
- 1929 – Guillermo Toussaint y 11 fotógrafos mexicanos, at Galería de Arte Mexicano in Teatro Nacional (current Palacio de Bellas Artes), in Mexico City.
- 1931 – Exposición Fotográfica Jiménez-Latapí, at Galería Excélsior, in Mexico City.
- 1931 – La Tolteca, at Teatro Nacional, in Mexico City.
- 1963 – Concurso Nacional Fotográfico “Así es México”.
- 2011 – Otras miradas: fotógrafas en México, 1872–1960, at Museo de Arte Moderno in Mexico City.

== Collections ==
- Archivo fotográfico Agustín Jiménez/María Jiménez
- Colección Familia Latapí-López
- Colección Gregory Leroy
- Colección José Antonio Rodríguez
