= Ruairí Harkin =

Northern Irish footballer (born 1989)

Personal information
- Date of birth: 11 October 1989 (age 37)
- Place of birth: Derry, Northern Ireland
- Position: Central midfielder

Youth career
- Don Bosco's
- Charlton Athletic

Senior career*
Years	Team	Apps	(Gls)
2006–2008	Charlton Athletic	0	(0)
2007–2008	→ Heybridge Swifts (loan)		
2009–2011	Derry City	43	(3)
2009	→ Finn Harps (loan)	12	(0)
2012–2016	Coleraine	133	(10)
2016–2019	Cliftonville	28	(2)
2019–	Finn Harps	15	(0)

International career
2005	Northern Ireland U16		
2006	Republic of Ireland U17	4	(0)
2006–2008	Republic of Ireland U19		
- * Club domestic league appearances and goals

Ruairí Harkin (born 11 October 1989) is an Irish former footballer who played as a central midfielder.

== Club career ==
=== Youth ===
Harkin began his career at a very young age with Don Boscos. Throughout his career with Don Bosco's, Harkin made several appearances for the Derry and District League Select in the Foyle Cup and also County Londonderry in the Milk Cup. Having turned down opportunities to sign for a number of English clubs, such as Blackburn Rovers, in order to finish his GCSE exams at St. Columb's College, he eventually signed for Charlton Athletic in the summer of 2006.

=== Senior ===
Harkin looked set to have a bright future in the game and his ability was praised by coaches. However, the young midfielder failed to play a senior game for the English team and instead languished in the reserves, before being loaned out to non-league outfit, Heybridge Swifts. At the end of 2008, Harkin was released by Charlton and promptly snapped up by his hometown club, Derry City. Harkin was loaned out to Derry's rivals, Finn Harps at the beginning of the 2009 season. He made 12 appearances for Harps in the early part of 2009 before returning to the Brandywell where he turned out 3 times for the Candystripes before the season ended. Ruairi made 20 league appearances for Derry in 2010, scoring three times, as the club won the First Division title, and in 2011 he made another 20 appearances, though 14 of these came as a substitute. Harkin signed for Coleraine in the Irish Premier League on 5 January 2012. Harkin joined Cliftonville on 1 August 2016 for a fee believed to be £18,000.

== International career ==
Having represented Northern Ireland at Under-16 level, Derry-born Harkin was later called up to the Republic of Ireland Under-19 squad, where he was capped four times between 2006 and 2008.

== Career statistics ==
As of 15 February 2021

Appearances and goals by club, season and competition
Club	Season	League			National cup		League cup		Other		Total	
Club	Season	Division	Apps	Goals	Apps	Goals	Apps	Goals	Apps	Goals	Apps	Goals
Derry City	2009	LOI Premier Division	4	0	0	0	0	0	—		4	0
Derry City	2010	LOI First Division	20	3	0	0	0	0	—		20	3
Derry City	2011	LOI Premier Division	19	0	0	0	2	1	—		21	1
Derry City	Total		43	3	0	0	2	1	—		45	4
Finn Harps	2009	LOI First Division	12	0	0	0	0	0	—		12	0
Coleraine	2011–12	IFA Premiership	13	0	2	0	1	0	—		16	0
Coleraine	2012–13	IFA Premiership	37	2	2	0	1	0	2 (Note: Appearances in the Setanta Sports Cup.)	0	42	2
Coleraine	2013–14	NIFL Premiership	30	4	1	0	1	0	2	1	34	5
Coleraine	2014–15	NIFL Premiership	19	3	0	0	1	0	—		21	3
Coleraine	2015–16	NIFL Premiership	34	1	1	0	3	0	—		38	1
Coleraine	Total		133	10	6	0	7	0	4	1	150	11
Cliftonville	2016–17	NIFL Premiership	14	2	0	0	1	0	—		15	2
Cliftonville	2017–18	NIFL Premiership	9	0	2	0	0	0	—		11	0
Cliftonville	2018–19	NIFL Premiership	6	0	0	0	0	0	—		6	0
Cliftonville	Total		29	2	2	0	1	0	—		32	2
Finn Harps	2019	LOI Premier Division	7	0	0	0	0	0	2 (Note: Appearances in the Relegation Playoff.)	0	9	0
Finn Harps	2020	LOI Premier Division	8	0	2	0	0	0	—		10	0
Finn Harps	2021	LOI Premier Division	0	0	0	0	0	0	—		0	0
Finn Harps	Total		15	0	2	0	0	0	2	0	19	0
Career total			245	15	10	0	10	1	6	1	271	17
