= List of Gate characters =

This is a list of characters appearing in the Japanese fantasy novel series Gate: Jieitai Kano Chi nite, Kaku Tatakaeri, published by Arcadia, and its sequel series Gate Season 2, Gaiden and Zero.

== Original series ==
=== Main characters ===
Yōji Itami (伊丹 耀司, Itami Yōji)
Voiced by: Junichi Suwabe (Japanese); David Wald (English)
The protagonist of the series, Itami is a 33-year-old otaku and JSDF soldier. After successfully escorting hundreds of citizens to safety during the attack on Ginza, Itami is promoted to the rank of first lieutenant and tasked to investigate the world on the other side of the Gate. He is a certified JSDF Ranger and Special Forces commando (although this only occurred due to his superiors' futile attempts to discipline him), and while he is notable for being a slacker and a fast runner from trouble, he is honest and compassionate and can be quite capable when under stress. He is also later rendered immune to bodily harm due to a contract Rory Mercury makes with him, in exchange for him becoming her servant upon his death. With his heroic acts during the battle of Ginza and in the world beyond the Gate, he also becomes a role model for his fellow JSDF soldiers and his friends in Alnus Town.
Itami's family name is derived from the city of Itami in the Hyōgo Prefecture, where the JGSDF Central Army headquarters is located.
Piña Co Lada (ピニャ・コ・ラーダ, Pinya Ko Rāda)
Voiced by: Haruka Tomatsu (Japanese); Jessica Boone (English)
A 19-year-old princess from the Empire that rules the other world. Born to an Imperial concubine, and 10th (3rd in the anime) in the line of succession to the throne, Piña Co Lada is dedicated to the Empire's welfare. Idealistic but inexperienced, she has at first trouble dealing with the realities of political life, but matures during the course of the series. After seeing the JSDF's military power in action, she wishes to establish peace with Japan, as she knows that a war with them will eventually lead to the Empire's ultimate destruction. During her first visit to Japan to meet with several officials, Piña develops an obsession with yaoi dōjinshi and later has her Rose Knights translate more of them for her to read. After being rescued from Zorzal's clutches, Piña is appointed Crown Princess by Emperor Molt and ends up falling in love with Itami. Oddly, her name is taken from the rum-based cocktail Piña colada.
Tuka Luna Marceau (テュカ・ルナ・マルソー, Tyuka Runa Marusō)
Voiced by: Hisako Kanemoto (Japanese); Juliet Simmons (English)
Tuka is a 165-year-old High Elf, an adolescent by her race's standards. She loses her father who sacrifices himself to save her when her village is attacked by a Flame Dragon, and since then travels with Itami and co. However, she has a hard time coping with her father's death, and eventually begins to lapse into insanity, starting to view Itami as her lost father. But even after overcoming her loss with Itami's help, she keeps calling him "father" both out of habit and out of bashfulness about her budding true feelings for him. She has also entertained a temporary crush on Mari Kurokawa.
Lelei La Lelena (レレイ・ラ・レレーナ, Rerei Ra Rerēna)
Voiced by: Nao Tōyama (Japanese); Brittney Karbowski (English)
A 15-year-old mage from the other world, a former member of the Rurudo nomad tribe, and a student to an elderly sorcerer who is notable for her platinum-blonde hair and perpetually emotionless expression. She considers herself legally married to Itami after the latter unwittingly fulfilled an ancient wedding custom, which involves a couple spending three consecutive nights in the same room. Brilliant and inquisitive, Lelei quickly learns the Japanese language and becomes the interpreter/translator for Itami's party. Thanks to the knowledge of physics acquired during her visits to Earth, combined with her natural magical abilities and a gift from the underworld goddess Hardy, she eventually becomes capable of opening a Gate between the Special Region and Japan at will.
Rory Mercury (ロゥリィ・マーキュリー, Rōri Mākyurī)
Voiced by: Risa Taneda (Japanese); Molly Searcy (English)
A 961-year-old demigoddess and the Apostle of the god Emroy. She's usually dressed in her formal apostle wear, which strongly resembles Gothic Lolita fashion. Rory's status as a demigoddess entails that she cannot die and can recover from any wound; upon her 1,000th birthday, she will ascend and become a full goddess. She's superhumanly strong, which allows her to wield her extremely heavy signature halberd with ease, and very fast and agile, with centuries of combat experience. Her presence and status as an Apostle are also a great help to Itami's group in establishing social relations within the Special Region. Her only major weakness is her fear of going underground, due to her dislike for Hardy, the Special Region's goddess of the underworld who desires Rory as her bride. She originally joined up with the JSDF to infiltrate them and destroy the Gate, but after meeting Itami, she takes a particular interest in him because of his sincerity and, owing to this affection, later opts to become the Goddess of Love upon her ascension.
Yao Haa Dushi (ヤオ・ハー・デュッシ, Yao Hā Dyusshi)
Voiced by: Yoko Hikasa (Japanese); Rachel Landon (English)
A Dark Elf who is over 300 years old; her middle name is a reference to the underworld goddess Hardy, who is worshipped by her people. She seeks the JSDF's aid when the same dragon that attacked Tuka's village moves to the forest where her tribe lives, becoming a threat to them. After the dragon is vanquished, and after learning that the Apostle of Hardy was responsible for its rampage, she renounces her faith in Hardy, changes her name to Yao Ro Dushi (ヤオ・ロゥ・デュッシ, Yao Rō Dyusshi) (with "Ro" in reverence of Rory Mercury, who came to the aid of her people) and offers herself to Itami as a slave. Unlike the other three girls in Itami's company, she isn't as relentless in pursuing his affections, but she is just as perplexed about his seemingly indifferent attitude about their relationship, especially since her penchant for bad luck keeps her self-esteem low and she regards Itami as a pillar of support.

=== Japanese characters ===
==== Third Recon Unit ====
While the Recon Unit encompasses a total of eleven members, the characters listed here are those who gain special prominence in the story.

Shino Kuribayashi (栗林 志乃, Kuribayashi Shino)
Voiced by: Maaya Uchida (Japanese); Stephanie Wittels (English)
A petite but buxom Sergeant First Class of the Third Recon Unit under Itami, she does not hold him in high regard due to his otaku nature. She idolizes the Japanese Rangers and Special Forces; a perception which is somewhat broken when she learns that Itami is a certified member of both. She excels in hand-to-hand combat and prefers charging head-first into a battle to take on her opponents with just her rifle-mounted bayonet. She remains in the Special Region when the Gate is closed, because the new world presents her with a chance to cut loose with her combative nature and because she has fallen in love with her teammate Tomita, despite him being already involved with Bozes of the Rose Knights.
Akira Tomita (富田 章, Tomita Akira)
Voiced by: Hiroki Yasumoto (Japanese); Ty Mahany (English)
Sergeant First Class Tomita, a 27-year-old trained Ranger, is the gentle giant of the unit who is a solemn but kind man and often acts as the voice of reason within the group. He and Bozes enter a relationship, and as a result he is one of the JSDF servicemen remaining in the Special Region when the Gate is closed.
Takeo Kurata (倉田 武雄, Kurata Takeo)
Voiced by: Kaito Ishikawa (Japanese); Tyler Galindo (English)
A 21-year-old sergeant in the JSDF and driver on the recon team, he is also an otaku like Itami, with a special fetish for catgirls. His geeky fantasy becomes reality when he meets Persia, a housemaid of the Formal Clan who happens to be half-cat. The two become close very quickly and are nearly inseparable whenever Kurata visits Italica. Owing to this affection, Kuruta is one of the JSDF servicemen who voluntarily stays in the Special Region when the original Gate is shut down.
Mari Kurokawa (黒川 茉莉, Kurokawa Mari)
Voiced by: Satomi Akesaka (Japanese); Allison Sumrall (English)
The medic of the Third Recon Team with the rank of Sergeant First Class, at 190cm she is an unusually tall woman. Her father is a submarine commander in the Japan Maritime Self-Defense Force. She can be uncomfortably sharp-tongued in her opinions at times, especially to Itami if she suspects he has ulterior motives related to his otaku hobbies. While she cares for the well-being of those under her supervision, especially civilians, she can be very vicious with disobedient patients, often using means of intimidation bordering on sadism to discipline them. At the end of the series, she has returned to Earth and become head nurse of the JSDF Central Hospital.
Soichiro Kuwahara (桑原 惣一郎, Kuwahara Sōichirō)
Voiced by: Kanehira Yamamoto (Japanese); Josh Morrison (English)
A fifty-year-old Sergeant Major who serves as Itami's second in command. As the oldest member in the unit, he has experience and wisdom of training and leading recruits on the field. He replaces Itami as team leader after the latter runs off to kill the Fire Dragon on his own and is consequently relieved of his command. After the original Gate has closed, he retires from the JSDF and works at a security firm while spending time with his newly-born grandchildren.
Hitoshi Furuta (古田 均, Furuta Hitoshi)
Voiced by: Daiki Hamano (Japanese); Adam Gibbs (English)
A leading private in the Third Recon Team who used to work in his family's first-class restaurant until he got into an argument with the new management, and joined the JSDF to gather the funds to open his own restaurant. During the team's mission in the Imperial Capital, he goes undercover as a chef after his cooking gets the interest of Prince Zorzal. There he falls in love with Tyūle, Zorzal's Warrior Bunny concubine and secret adversary; they end up aiding each other in thwarting the tyrannical prince, and after Tyūle's death and the closure of the Gate, he and Delilah open a restaurant in Tokyo in her memory.

==== JSDF Special Region Task Force ====
Kōichirou Hazama (狭間 浩一郎, Hazama Kōichirou)
Voiced by: Hiroshi Yanaka (Japanese); John Gremillion (English)
A JSDF Lieutenant General in charge of the JSDF task force within the Special Region who holds Itami in high regard despite the latter's reckless attitude. As a responsible commander, he is one of the JSDF servicemen who stays behind when the Gate is shut down.
Akira Yanagida (柳田 明, Yanagida Akira)
Voiced by: Koji Yusa (Japanese); Chris Patton (English)
A First Lieutenant who serves as General Hazama's aide. He dislikes Itami due to the latter gaining his rank due to the Ginza Incident, whereas he had to earn it by hard work himself. Unlike Itami, who cares about the people of the Special Region and wants to help them, Yanagida sees no problem in manipulating and exploiting the Special Region's people and resources for Japan's gain. He eventually develops a grudging respect for Itami despite the fact that the two seem to antagonize each other over minor details, especially regarding Itami's nonchalant attitude and his ability to gain allies so easily.
Osamu Higaki (檜垣 統, Higaki Osamu)
Voiced by: Ryunosuke Watanuki (Japanese); Adam Noble (English)
A major in the Special Region Task Force and Itami's immediate superior, who is usually frustrated by Itami's lax attitude violating military protocol.
Shunya Kengun (健軍 俊也, Kengun Shunya)
Voiced by: Rikiya Koyama
A JSDF colonel and commander of the Special Region Task Force's 4th Combat Unit, an air assault company, and a veteran of Italica and the evacuation of the Jade Palace. Despite their age difference and language barrier, he begins a relationship with Rose Knight Beefeater E Caty, and is one of the servicemen remaining in the Special Region after the Gate's collapse.
Naoki Kamo (加茂 直樹, Kamo Naoki)
Voiced by: Taketora
A colonel and the commander of the 1st Task Force Combat Unit, a mixed infantry corps.
Akira Kamikoda (神子田 瑛, Kamikoda Akira)
Voiced by: Eiji Takemoto
A somewhat hot-blooded lieutenant colonel in the Japanese Air Force, and the leader of the JASDF branch of the Task Force, flying a F4 Phantom. He stays in the Special Region upon the Gate's closure because of the lack of flying restrictions in that world, and because of his romantic attentions towards the Rose Knights.
Nyūtabaru (新田原, Nyūtabaru)
Voiced by: Tetsu Mikami
A major and chief of the JSDF detachment stationed in Akusho, the Imperial Capital's red-light district.

==== Japanese government and citizens ====
Tarō Kanō (嘉納 太郎, Kanou Tarou)
Voiced by: Tetsuo Kanao (Japanese); Steven Finely (English)
The Japanese Minister of Defense and Itami's old friend. Like Itami, he is also an otaku. Strong-willed and patriotic, he succeeds Prime Minister Morita as an interim candidate after he and the other Cabinet members expose Morita's cowardice in intending to surrender administration of the Gate to a foreign international conspiracy instead of defending his nation's sovereignty. At the end of the series, he has retired from politics and thus become free to pursue his otaku passions once more.
Risa Aoi (葵 梨紗, Aoi Risa)
Voiced by: Yoshino Nanjō (Japanese); Chelsea McCurdy (English)
Itami's ex-wife and a yaoi doujin artist whose hobby of collecting dolls leave her broke quite frequently. Having been former classmates in college, she and Itami married for convenience: Itami provided money for Risa's hobby and Risa looked after the household for Itami. Risa divorced Itami after she tried to convince Itami not to go to the Special Region and realized that he never really loved her. Nevertheless, they still care about each other, with Itami still providing financial support to Risa. Risa still loves Itami, even though she knows he'll never realize it on his own. After encountering Piña, she becomes the princess' main source for doujin manga.
Noriko Mochizuki (望月 紀子, Mochizuki Noriko)
Voiced by: Hibiku Yamamura (Japanese); Katelyn Barr (English)
One of several Japanese civilians who were captured by Imperial scouts prior to the Ginza Incident. She was taken to the Imperial capital, where she became Prince Zorzal's sex slave. When the JSDF learn of Noriko's presence, they rescue her and warn the Empire there will be consequences if all other Japanese slaves are not repatriated. Despite her traumatic experience and the loss of her entire family during the Ginza Incident, she returns to Alnus to act as a liaison between the locals and the Japanese media. After witnessing the callous sensationalist pursuits of the Japanese media in the Special Region (especially as personified by Kazunari Komurazaki), she begins to crusade against this bias, determined to serve only the truth to the Japanese public.
Nanami Kuribayashi (栗林 菜々美, Kuribayashi Nanami)
Voiced by: Yurika Kubo
Shino's younger sister and a rookie newscaster. After she finds out that the news concerning the Special Region are censored by elements in the Japanese government looking out for their own interests instead of the public's, she dedicates herself to relaying the pure truth about the other world and root out the corruption in the Japanese media. After the closure of the Gate, she establishes a popular online news studio.
Kōji Sugawara (菅原 浩治, Sugawara Kouji)
Voiced by: Kazuyuki Okitsu (Japanese); Jay Hickman (English)
A Ministry of Foreign Affairs official who is sent to the Special Region as an ambassador to the Empire as part of a delegation to convince the Empire to seek peace with Japan. When he meets Sherry Tyueri and she falls in love with him, he is quite awkward about her affection for him considering her tender age, but genuinely cares about her. When Zorzal takes over the throne and his Oprichnina arrests members of the nobility who seek peace with Japan, he saves Sherry by declaring that she is his fiancé. Before the Gate is closed, he decides to remain in the Special Region to maintain the diplomatic ties between Japan and the Empire.
Reiko Shirayuri (白百合 玲子, Shirayuri Reiko)
Voiced by: Risa Hayamizu (Japanese); Carolyn Medrano (English)
The Vice Minister of Foreign Affairs in charge of the Special Region.
Hideyo Komakado (駒門 英世, Komakado Hideyo)
Voiced by: Takuya Kirimoto
A leading member of the Japanese Defense Intelligence Headquarters and later of the Public Security Division, who acts as a guide and head of personal security during the official visits of Itami's troupe in Japan. Later he proves instrumental in deposing Prime Minister Morita for conspiracy against Japan's national interests and installing Minister Kanō as an interim candidate in his place.
Kazunari Komurazaki (古村崎 一也, Komurazaki Kazunari)
Voiced by: Ozamu Sakuta
An extremely arrogant, superficial Japanese journalist who constantly tries to score negative press about the JSDF in the Special Region solely for publicity's sake. His selfishness and recklessness endanger and even cause the death of some of his support personnel in his sensationalist pursuits, making him very unpopular with the Japanese on-site.

=== Special Region characters ===
==== The Empire ====
The Empire has at the time of the JSDF's arrival remained the dominant political domain in the Special Region for over 687 years. Its political, cultural and military systems are patterned after those of the ancient Roman Empire. Humans form the primary social class; demihumans are by Imperial law considered non-citizens.

Zorzal El Caesar (ゾルザル・エル・カエサル, Zoruzaru Eru Kaesaru)
Voiced by: Katsuyuki Konishi (Japanese); Kregg Daily (English)
First Prince of the Empire, Piña's eldest half-brother, and the main antagonist of the series. Mentally unstable, arrogant and vain, yet cunning enough to play the role of a foolish upstart (for his father to believe that he could be easily used as a proxy once he retires), Zorzal is a sadist who enjoys committing rape, murder and genocide, and owns a number of sex slaves. After Itami frees his Japanese prisoner Noriko from his clutches, Zorzal swears revenge, installs himself as the new Emperor, and attempts to wage a new war against Japan, heedless of the JSDF's technological superiority. In the end, after a reckless all-out attack on Piña before the gates of Italica, he loses all and is killed by Tyūle, although he succeeds in taking her with him.
Tyūle (テューレ, Tyūre)
Voiced by: Ami Koshimizu (Japanese); Maggie Flecknoe (English)
Zorzal's sex slave and the former Queen of the Warrior Bunny Tribe. Her tribe was at war with the Empire, but realizing they could not win, she gave herself up to Prince Zorzal as his slave in exchange for him sparing her tribe. However, Zorzal did not keep his word and brutally slaughtered and enslaved her people while lying to the survivors that Tyūle sold them out to save herself, which gained her her tribe's hatred. Upon learning the truth, Tyūle swore revenge to bring down the Empire by appearing submissive to Zorzal while secretly manipulating him into waging a suicidal war with Japan that would bring the Empire to complete ruin. She falls in love with Furuta Hitoshi, but in the end cannot let go of her vengeance against Zorzal, and when she is found out, she and the prince end up killing each other.
Molt Sol Augustus (モルト・ソル・アウグスタス, Moruto Soru Augusutasu)
Voiced by: Atsushi Ono (Japanese); Jason Douglas (English)
The Special Region's Emperor and Piña's father. Despite knowing that the Japanese forces far outclass the Empire's, he is initially reluctant to seek peace with them, fearing that they might be truly unstoppable should he give them time to establish a foothold. After being rescued from Zorzal's clutches, and after realizing that the JSDF are his best hope for preserving the Empire, he allies himself with them and appoints Piña as his rightful successor.
Duran (デュラン, Dyuran)
Voiced by: Masao Amada (Japanese); Marty Fleck (English)
The king of Elbe Kingdom, Duran was part of the second wave of forces sent by the Empire to recapture Alnus hill from the JSDF "invaders". His forces were annihilated, and when Princess Piña found him, he was a crippled shell of a man waiting for his death, either from the Empire or his own people. Later on, he secretly poses as a disabled refugee at Alnus and is rehabilitated by the JSDF with prosthetic limbs and medical treatment. He later serves as a pivotal person in allowing the JSDF to cross the Elbe kingdom and help Itami defeat the Fire Dragon, and as a member of the pro-Imperial coalition against Zorzal.
Helm Fule Maio (ヘルム・フレ・マイオ, Herumu Fure Maio)
Voiced by: Yusuke Kobayashi (Japanese); Blake Shepard (English)
A former founding member of the Order of the Rose Knights, who after leaving the group became a viscount. He participated in and was captured during the Imperial attack on Ginza, and seeking to repay Japan for his humiliation, he becomes one of Zorzal's military advisors during the Imperial civil war. His main ambition is to prove himself Piña's better, a prospect in which he fails when he is unceremoniously captured after the Second Battle of Italica.
Diabo Sol Caesar (ディアボ・ソル・カエサル, Diabo Soru Kaesaru)
Voiced by: Yuichiro Umehara
The ambitious but cowardly younger brother of Zorzal who seeks the throne despite not being next in the line of succession. When Zorzal takes over, he flees to Alnus in order to enlist a foreign power in aiding his ascension, resulting in him entering a deal with the Chinese government to make him the Emperor in return for delivering Lelei to them. However, after the Chinese betray him, Rory Mercury appoints him as the nominal "puppet" governor of the Alnus Living Community to satisfy his ambitions.
Sherry Tyueri (シェリー・テュエリ, Sherī Tyueri)
Voiced by: Rina Hidaka (Japanese); Luci Christian (English)
Sherry is the 12-year-old daughter of the Tyueri family, a noble family related to Marquess Casel, an influential senator. Wanting to improve his connections to Casel, Sugawara offered to have a pearl necklace delivered to Sherry following their meeting at a party. Following this, Sherry fell in love with Sugawara, and attempted to pursue him whenever he was near. She quickly demonstrates a wisdom and maturity beyond her years, showing a keen understanding of the awkward interactions between Japan and the people of the Empire, as well as the problems this would pose to Japan and her "future husband"; for this reason, she eagerly offers to aid Sugawara and help bridge the gap between their nations. After her parents' death during Zorzal's purge of the Imperial pro-peace factions, Marquess Casel adopts Sherry as his ward, and Emperor Molt later appoints her as his emissary in Japan, a role which she fulfills with uncanny capability. When the Gate is closed, she moves in with Sugawara's family to await the reunion of the two worlds.
Marcus (マルクス, Marukusu)
Voiced by: Ryou Sugisaki (Japanese); Andrew Love (English)
The Empire's Minister of Internal Affairs, and chief adviser and right hand of Emperor Molt Augustus. In some translations his name is spelled "Marx".

==== Order of the Rose Knights ====
The Order of the Rose Knights, founded and led by Imperial Princess Piña Co Lada, consists of a predominantly female group of noble women from the Empire. Originally, they served as color guard and "decorative" pieces for the Empire's Army and were never used in battle. Their first actual battle came at the Siege of Italica, where rogue Allied Soldiers became marauders and attacked the merchant city, an event where the Knights demonstrated their skills and loyalty to the Empire and their princess.

Grey Co Aldo (グレイ・コ・アルド, Gurei Ko Arudo)
Voiced by: Itaru Yamamoto (Japanese); Rob Mungle (English)
A commoner by birth and a veteran Imperial knight assigned under Princess Piña who also served as the Rose Knights' mentor and combat instructor.
Hamilton Uno Law (ハミルトン・ウノ・ロー, Hamiruton Uno Roru)
Voiced by: Ikumi Hayama (Japanese); Shanae'a Moore (English)
Princess Piña's page, who is two years her junior. She was part of Princess Pina's group during the Siege of Italica and assisted Piña in making a treaty with the JDSF. After her own interaction with the JDSF, she feels reliable, dependable, and trustful towards the actions and words of Itami and his 3rd Recon Team.
Bozes Co Palesti (ボーゼス・コ・パレスティー, Bōzesu Ko Paresutī)
Voiced by: Yumi Uchiyama (Japanese); Patricia Duran (English)
Second daughter of Marquis Palesti, and second in command of Princess Piña's order of Knights; given the title of the Gold Rose. She develops mutually shared feelings for Tomita, formalizes a forbidden relationship with him and becomes pregnant with his child, Mai.
Panache Fure Kalgi (パナシュ・フレ・カルギー, Panashu Fure Karugī)
Voiced by: Azuki Shibuya (Japanese); Kira Vincent-Davis (English)
A member of the Order, as well as a close friend of Princess Piña. Her later love affair with Piña's brother Diabo makes her both his reluctant accomplice and a moderating influence in his own ascension plans.
Beefeater E Caty (ビーフィーター・E・カティー, Bīfuītā I Katī)
Voiced by: Mutsumi Tamura
Beefeater is a captain of the Rose Knights and one of Princess Piña's oldest acquaintances. She later enters into a relationship with Colonel Kengun of the 401st Company, who led the Jade Palace rescue. It wasn't clear if author Takumi Yanai based her character name "Beefeater" on the Yeoman Warders, who are also called "Beefeaters", or on a popular Gin brand that also goes by the same name. In the English dubs, her name is revised from Beefeater to either "Vivita" or "Vifeeta".
Shandy Graff Marea (シャンディー・ガフ・マレア, Shandī Gafu Marea)
Voiced by: Rumi Ōkubo (Japanese); Shelby Blocker (English)
A young Imperial noble who is part of the Order of the Rose Knights. Shandy has a weakness for famous people, and tends to romanticize owing to her enthusiasm. She is the one who originally reports the Flame Dragon's defeat to the Empire, and later assists Itami and his group guarding Leilei from assassins during her Master Exam. During the Imperial civil war, she is killed in the Second Battle of Italica after being overwhelmed by Haryo tribe assassins while defending Emperor Molt.

==== Clan Formal ====
Clan Formal is a neutral clan that resides in the city of Italica, an important agricultural town. The former patriarch was Count Colt Formal, a nobleman who took in many poor residents and humanoids as servants and as a personal "hobby". The maids are also skilled in combat in case the household is threatened. With the founding of the Alnus settlement, several of the Formal household servants move there to aid the JSDF as public workers (shopkeepers, barmaids, etc.). After the failure of Zorzal's coup d'état and the rescue of Princess Piña and Emperor Molt, Italica becomes the temporary seat of the legitimate Imperial government.

Myui Formal (ミュイ・フォルマル, Myui Forumaru)
The third and (at 11 years) youngest daughter of Colt Formal and his wife, who perished in an accident, and his heir and nominal leader of the Formal household.
Kaine (カイネ, Kaine)
Voiced by: Mabuki Andou
The de facto guardian of Countess Myui and head of the female household servants. While she dislikes the Empire because it subjugated her homeland by force, she is a gracious host and trustworthy ally. Her primary interest is the protection of the Countess, though, which initially drives her into employing her household servants as spies against the JSDF in order to discern their ultimate motives.
Delilah (デリラ, Derira)
Voiced by: Aina Kusuda
A Warrior Bunny maid and spy for Clan Formal at the Alnus Community. A proud warrior of her people, she refused to subjugate herself to slavery after Zorzal captured her queen Tyūle, whom she wants to kill due to Zorzal's lies. She and other fugitives from her people were eventually taken in by Count Formal. After she is tricked by Tyūle, Bouro and a traitor within House Formal into attempting to murder Noriko, she opens a relationship with Akira Yanagida and joins the Japanese Special Forces in their forays against Zorzal's forces during the Imperial civil war. After the war's conclusion, she moves to Japan before the Gate's closure and together with Furuta opens a restaurant dedicated to Tyūle's memory.
Meia (メイア, Meia)
Voiced by: Asuka Nishi
A young catgirl maid from House Formal who has taken up work at the Alnus settlement's PX shop.
Persia (ペルシア, Perushia)
Voiced by: Megumi Han
A pince-nez-wearing catgirl maid who becomes romantically involved with Kurata.
Mamina (マミーナ, Mamīna)
Voiced by: Saori Ōnishi
A Warrior Bunny maid.
Aurea (アウレア, Aurea)
Voiced by: Momo Asakura
A Medusa maid at House Formal. Unlike her mythological template, she is very pretty and does not turn people to stone, but rather drains their life energy and memories. She was hired by the late Count to ease the passing of dying house members into the afterlife.

==== Deities ====
The Special Region is home to several deities - both full-fledged gods and demigods - who act as guardians against undesired developments amongst the other world's people, either by sponsoring those who promote the natural balance or by eradicating any elements which threaten it. Demigods, also called Apostles, are first selected from among mortal beings with great potential; they maintain a physical form, but remain eternally young and alive even after suffering dismemberment, until they become spiritual beings and ascend to godhood upon their 1,000th year. These newly ascended gods are free to claim one of the domains held by the deity they served, or any aspect not yet claimed by another deity, or become a specific region's divine patron. Many denizens of the Special Region base their middle names on the name of the deity they personally worship.

Hardy (ハーディー, Hādī)
Hardy ("Hades" in the Alpha Manga Service dubs) is the Goddess of the Underworld in the Special Region, whose main temple is located in the city of Belnago. The uniforms of her priestesses are similar to Rory Mercury's clothes in a lolita-type fashion, except that they are colored white. Hardy is very whimsical and likes to act upon her own desires; she is also a lesbian, and would like to claim Rory as her bride. As an incorporeal being, she can only directly interact with the mortal world if she takes possession of someone's body. She is also responsible for opening the original gateway to Earth in order to see the Empire plunged into chaos and enable a new beginning, and for awakening the Flame Dragon to destroy the Gate; a plan which was foiled when Itami killed the monster.
Giselle (ジゼル, Jizeru)
Voiced by: Ayane Sakura
Giselle is a member of the dragon folk, the youngest of the Twelve Apostles in the Special Region (at an age of just over 400 years), and Hardy's personal servant. She considers herself a rival to Rory Mercury and is responsible for waking the Flame Dragon in Hardy's name. Upon her mistress' orders, she later ends up aiding the JSDF against Zorzal's forces and the cataclysmic effects of the Gate's continued existence.
Emroy (エムロイ, Emuroi)
Mentioned often but never seen, the God of Darkness, War, Violence, and Death is commonly represented by his Apostle, Rory Mercury. Under his doctrine, killing is not considered a sin, though the reason behind any killing determines the judgement which the perpetrators receive from Emroy. The souls of those who fall bravely in battle are drawn into Emroy's domain to serve him; most other souls are instead left for Hardy to claim.
Elran (エルラン, Eruran) and La (ラー, Rā)
The Twin Gods of Knowledge and Learning, who founded the city of Rondel during their Apostle period.
Lunaryu (ルナリュー, Runaryū)
The Special Region's God of Music.
Miritta (ミリッタ, Miritta)
The Special Region's Goddess of Fertility and Birth, responsible for good harvests and safe childbirths. While popular in this regard, her worshippers must at least once in their lives work as temple prostitutes to fulfill their obligations to her.

==== Sages of Rondel ====
Rondel is a university city for studies in magic, natural science and history. It was founded by Elran and La over 3,000 years ago, and has produced a great number of renowned magicians and sages since that time. Next to Italica and the settlement at Alnus, it is also one of the few places within the Empire where demihumans enjoy the same basic rights as human beings.

Kato El Altestan (カト・エル・アルテスタン, Kato Eru Arutesutan)
Voiced by: Chō (Japanese); John Swasey (English)
A magician who took in Lelei as his second disciple in magic. A slightly eccentric character, he moved away from Rondel to settle at the outskirts of Coda village, where he and Lelei first met the JSDF. In spite of his lecherous sense of humour, he plays a fatherly role for the refugees evacuated to Alnus by Itami; many in Rondel regard him as one of the strongest mages. In the anime series, however, he is reduced to the role of an oddball side character.
Arpeggio El Lalena (アルペジオ・エル・ラレーナ, Arupejio Eru Rarēna)
Voiced by: Ayahi Takagaki (Japanese); Emily Neves (English)
Lelei's 24-year-old stepsister. She mainly focuses on alchemy and more specifically the study of minerals. This field is quite expensive in her world and receives little funding, causing her to live a life of poverty. To compensate for this, she works to create copies of books by hand (as the printing press wasn't invented in the Special Region), but the stress of her current lifestyle leaves her prone to violent fits of hysteria. And while she deeply cares about Lelei, Arpeggio feels jealous about how Lelei continually outachieves her and thus puts her authority as older sibling in question, and as a result of that the two sisters oftentimes end up quarreling. Owing to this volatile temper, Arpeggio is commonly nicknamed "Iron Alfie" by her peers.
Mimoza La Mer (ミモザ・ラ・メール, Mimoza Ra Mēru)
Voiced by: Fumi Hirano (Japanese); Marcy Bannor (English)
An elderly human sage specializing in natural history, and Arpeggio's mentor, who upon an assignment by Rory Mercury discovered the importance of the Gate to the Special Region races' collective history. She is very friendly and a happy person, but unappropiately girlish for her age and quite accident-prone.
Flat El Coda (フラット・エル・コーダ, Furatto Eru Kōda)
A young Elven research sage (sages not using arcane magic) specializing in astronomy, and the only one of his kind pursuing an academic career. He has a crush on Arpeggio, who is both flattered and embarrassed by his attentions and gentle manner. He does not appear in the anime.

==== Other residents ====
Hodor Ray Marceau (ホドリュー・レイ・マルソー, Hodoryū Rei Marusō)
Voiced by: Junichi Yanagita
A male High Elf and Tuka's father, who was apparently killed by the Flame Dragon destroying their village while saving his daughter's life. However, in the Gaiden stories it is found out that he is still alive, if amnesic, and under the care of the Rurudo nomads, Lelei's ethnic tribe, where he has built up a harem and sired a half-blood daughter.
Bouro (ボウロ, Bouro)
Voiced by: Tsuyoshi Koyama
A beast-man who is the leader of the Haryo, a tribe consisting of demihuman mixed-bloods who consider themselves the true rulers of the Special Region. In his ambition to infiltrate and eventually gain control of the Empire for his tribe, he allies himself with Tyūle, who he lusts after, to interbreed a half-blood into the Imperial lineage, but later betrays her to Zorzal and is killed by Tyūle for his treachery.
Norra (ノッラ, Norra)
Voiced by: Rina Satō
Norra, also known as The Piper (笛吹き男, Fuefukiotoko) ("Viper" in the AlphaPolis manga), is a vicious shape-shifter assassin from the Haryo tribe. Her natural form is that of a beast-woman, but she is able to radically change her appearance, sex and voice. While she is a capable fighter, she prefers to kill her victims through proxies, whom she influences psychologically until they are "convinced" that Norra's targets need to die for some "transgression". She dies during the second battle of Italica when she is shot by Kōji Sugawara before she can assassinate Emperor Molt.
Misery (ミザリィ, Mizarei)
Voiced by: Yuka Saitō
A female avian (Winged Woman) who works as a prostitute in the Imperial Capital's red light district Akusho. After the JSDF establishes a secret base in that area, she becomes the spokeswoman of the local demihuman prostitutes and their liaison with the SDF, particularly Mari Kurokawa, for medical treatment. Following Zorzal's takeover and the subsequent lockdown of the capital, she and the other demihumans get wealthy on smuggling much-needed food supplies past the blockade. In the novel and manga series, Misery becomes interested in Lt. Kenzaki, a Special Forces soldier stationed at the Imperial Capital outpost.
Myūte Luna Sires (ミューティ・ルナ・サイレス, Myūti Runa Sairesu)
Voiced by: Lynn
A Siren, she was once a member of the bandit army that attacked Italica before being captured by the JSDF. After her discharge from prison, she became a member of the local military police at the Alnus Living Community, usually as Rory Mercury's partner.
Wolf (ウォルフ, U~orufu)
Wolf, a guard working at the Alnus Living Community, is a member of the Volralden, a wolfman tribe originating from beyond the Ice and Snow Mountains northeast of Alnus who traditionally hire themselves out as mercenaries. A background character in the novel series, he chiefly appears in humorous side stories within the manga.
Gaston Nor Boa (ガストン・ノル・ボア, Gasuton Noru Boa)
Voiced by: Kōichi Sōma
The proprietor of the Alnus Town café who - chiefly out of worry for his livelihood once the Gate is closed - becomes one of Diabo's accomplices in kidnapping Lelei for the prince's bid for power.
Village Chief (村長, Sonchō)
Voiced by: Kenta Sasa (Japanese); Chris Gibson (English)
The chief of Coda village who is rescued by Itami and the 3rd Recon Team from the Flame Dragon. Later on he bears witness to the first atrocities committed by Zorzal's forces and the Haryo tribe against the Empire's civilian population, whereupon he is once again saved by Itami and his entourage and finds refuge in the Imperial capital. (The latter plot point is skipped in the anime series, where the chief inexplicably appears again in Itami's company, thanking Itami for saving him once more.)

=== Other characters from Earth ===
Dirrel (ディレル, Direru)
Voiced by: Mitsuaki Hoshino
The President of the United States. An opportunist, he seeks to lay claim to and strip the Special Region of its natural resources, comparing it with the frontier of old. He becomes a member of an international coalition to deprive Japan of its monopoly to the Gate, but after the Chinese betray them, he restores his good standing with the Japanese by sending commandos to snatch Lelei from their clutches.
Dong Dechou (董 徳愁, Dechou Dong)
Voiced by: Naomi Kusumi
The President of the People's Republic of China. His main intention is to use the Special Region as a colony to relieve his country's population problem. When he is contacted by Diabo and offered Lelei in return for making him Emperor, he turns against the secret coalition which has formed to deny Japan the monopolization of the Gate, and later against Diabo as well, to secure the exclusive access to the Special Region for his own.
Zyuganov (ジェガノフ, Jeganofu)
Voiced by: Shigeru Ushiyama
The President of the Russian Federation. Although he would like to profit from being able to tap into the Special Region, he is mainly concerned with the result the continued existence of the Gate could have on his country's economy, as the resources claimed from there would impair Russia's export revenues.

== Gate Gaiden ==
=== Japanese characters ===
==== Maritime Self-Defense Forces ====
Etajima Goro (江田島 五郎, Goro Etajima)
A JMSDF military intelligence officer and later captain aboard the Oyashio-class submarine Kitsashio and Tokushima's commanding officer, and a friend of Mari Kurokawa's father. He is an Age of Sail otaku who keeps a large collection of sailing ship models, even in his office. Etajima first appears in the Gaiden side stories, where he is one of the JSDF personnel stranded in the Special Region and has become Lieutenant General Hazama's aide after the Gate's closure. In Season 2, it is mentioned that after having noted Tokushima's cooking skills and taken pity on him, Goro offered him a position on his crew as an intelligence operator to pick up more worldly experience. He is tasked with the retrieval of Edmund Chan, the alleged American journalist who was captured after entering the Special Region without permission.

=== Special Region characters ===
Lady Fre Bagg
Formerly known as Lady Fre Randall, she is a niece of ex-Emperor Molt Sol Augustus and a cousin of Empress Piña Co Lada. Her father, Kati Sol Caesar, was murdered by Molt to secure his claim to the Imperial throne, and Fre was adopted by Prended Sol Randall, an Imperial chancellor; a fact that she is yet unaware about. Fre grew up as a dominant, manipulative and conniving figure in Imperial society, until Zorzal's takeover upended her life and forced her into exile. In the Gaiden stories she unsuccessfully tries to wrest the rule over the Empire away from Piña. She later became the Harlam (political leader) of the island nation of Atlantia Uruth in the Kondoran Sea.
Kemmy
A young pink-haired Aqua (mermaid) who lives in Pido Village in the Avion Sea. She first encounters the Japanese when she meets Itami and Piña after the latter get shipwrecked while investigating a border conflict between the kingdoms of Elbe and Toumalen.

== Gate Season 2 characters ==
=== Main characters ===
Tokushima Hajime (徳島 甫, Hajime Tokushima)
A Chief Petty Officer, 2nd Class in the Japan Maritime Self-Defense Force who occupies the positions of both culinary specialist (cook) with a special passion for potatoes and military intelligence operator aboard the Kitsashio. He originally wanted to become a chef, but after his food was panned for "lacking life experience" despite his innate talent, he enlisted in the JMSDF and was later invited by Etajima Goro to become part of the intelligence department.
Primera Luna Avion (プリメーア・ルナ・アヴィオン, Purimēa Runa Avu~ion)
A princess from the Special Region kingdom Tinae. Also known as "Tinae’s Jewel of The Blue Sea" or “Drunken Princess", she is shy and nervous, which led to her latter monicker due to her drinking bouts to calm her nerves. She first encounters the Japanese when Tokushima and Etajima end up rescuing her from a plot by Shamrock Ha Elixir to remove her from the Tinaen royal succession.
Shura No Arch (シュナ・ノ・アーチ, Shuna no Āchi)
A tomboyish female member of the Arch pirate family, an aspiring privateer captain, and a close friend of Princess Primera. Despite her position, Shuna has no experience in commanding a ship and relies heavily on Etajima for advice. She is most fascinated about the naval technology introduced to the Special Region by the JMSDF and spends a lot of time pestering the Japanese for information.
Odette Ze Nevula (オデット・ゼ・ネヴュラ, Odetto Ze Nevu~yura)
A member of the winged demihuman Avi species, priestess of the Four Sea Goddesses and close friend of Princess Primera. She first appears in the company of Admiral Caipirinha when they meet Tokushima and Etajima during their reconnaissance mission at the naval piers of Nasta while inspecting the ship that Caipirinha is about to receive captainship for.

=== Special Region characters ===
==== Antagonists ====
Shamrock Ha Elixir (シャムロック・ハ・エリクシール, Shamurokku Ha Erikushīru)
A low-ranking member of Tinae's Council of Ten (or Decemvirate), and an ambitious politician. A street rat during his childhood in the Imperial capitol's red light district, he was adopted by a wealthy merchant, rose in Tinae's society and formed connections to both numerous legit and criminal organizations using his leadership skills gained in his youth. His goal is to raise Tinae, which is in his eyes going into decline, back to its former glory, and is ruthless enough to enforce his will by all means necessary. His initial scheme to have Princess Primera removed from the throne, in order to prevent a political marriage with the prince of Shilaph which would remove Tinae's menace by the pirates and thereby render his intended role as Tinae's savior obsolete, backfires when this brought the princess in contact with Japan, who would prove a powerful obstacle in his plot.
Isla De Pinos (イスラ・デ・ピノス, Isura De Pinosu)
A female member of the Lenon demihuman species, and Shamrock's secretary, Her most distinguishable racial trait is a third eye on her forehead. She is quickwitted, observant and extremely skilled at reading people. While generally neutral-aligned, she is well aware of her master's plot but does not object against his methods.
Fatima
A juvenile human girl who is the leader of a gang of five orphaned girls serving Shamrock as information gatherers and occasional assassins. Members of this group include Atya (a cat demihuman), Patty (a mouse demihuman), Innie and Minnie (two demihumans of undefined origin).
Curaçao
One of Shamrock's underlings whom he sets up to captain the Odille in Cairpirinha's place, using his incapability at captaining a ship to ruin the Tinaen navy and therefore accelerate his plan to take power in Tinae.
Drake Do Mojito
A pirate captain who works for Shamrock.
Odile Ze Dvora
An Avi priestess of the Four Sea Goddesses who serves as part of Shamrock's crew.
The Black Hand
The Black Hand (Egli Mar in their native tongue) is, publicly at least, Tinae's intelligence agency. However, since Shamrock managed to get them into his pocket, many of their members are now also acting as his personal secret operations force to further his ambitions.

==== Tinae ====
Tinae is a republic with a culture similar to medieval Venice, and part of a seven-island archipelago in the Sea of Avion, southeast of the Empire on the mainland. Formerly part of the kingdom of Avion, the archipelago split into seven independent island states (Tinae, Javia, Ubulla, Manuham, Siraph, Sarandip and Rutubaga) after a civil war erupted and was later turned into an important commerce hub. At the time the JMSDF arrives at Tinae to free a captured American journalist, the island has been belaguered by pirate bands for some time, with the small Tinaen navy too overtaxed to hold them off. Its capitol, Nasta, is located on the former site of a swamp which was turned into a port due to its natural harbor.

Harvey Luna Walvanker
The Doge of Tinae and Primera's father.
Caipirinha Em Ruyter (カイピリーニャ・エム・ロイデル, Kaipirīnya Emu Roideru)
Tinae's High Admiral and captain candidate for the warship Ordell. He is also a notorious womanizer.
Ox Do Vi
A junior agent of the Black Hand who mediates the release of Edmund Chan with Tokushima, Etajima and the Japanese Ministry of Foreign Affairs. While resentful that his youth tends to make other people not take him very seriously, he is dedicated to his duty.

==== Deities ====
Eulo, Sevullah, Notos and Vorey
The four temperamental sister goddesses of the Avion Sea. The Avi species was created in their likeness, and many of their number serve as priestesses to one of the Four. Because they are vital in ensuring a ship's safety, the ships they're sailing on are traditionally named after the priestess assigned to accompany them.

==== Other characters from Earth ====
Edmund Chan
Allegedly a journalist of American-Taiwanese descend, he is actually a spy for the People's Republic of China. Sent to scout the Avion Sea area, he was captured and sold into slavery. On request of the CIA, who suspected his true allegiances, the JMSDF undertakes a retrieval mission which gradually gets Japan involved in Tinae's battle against piracy.

== Gate: Zero characters ==
=== Japanese characters ===
Sakoto Okita (沖田聡子, Okita Sakoto)
A female 21-year-old Japanese police officer who gets involved in the Ginza Incident in Gate: Zero. While seen as strong-willed and dependable on the outside, she is actually clumsy, timid, and naive; as a result she is extra careful in whatever she's doing on the job. She is, however, extremely skilled in kendo, which she uses to relieve stress. After escaping the initial attack wave, she joins Itami in a reconnaissance mission to find out more about the enemy forces.
Kokone (心寧, Kokone)
A 5-year-old girl who gets entangled in the attack on Ginza in Gate: Zero. Right before the Ginza incident, she is separated from her mother, and just as she is found by her mother and Sakoto Okita, the attack occurs. During their escape attempt, her mother falls behind due to an ankle injury and is killed after entrusting her daughter to Sakoto. Kokone is based on an original character - a child Itami takes care of in the Incident's aftermath - from the first episode of the anime series.
Saori Mononobe
A female rookie news reporter from the TV station Kyokko News who appears in Gate: Zero. She gets caught in the Imperial invasion while doing a report in Ginza, and along with her supervisor ends up in Prime Minister Yasuharu's entourage in their attempt to escape the fighting.
Kanetsuchi Nichiyō
Saori Mononobe's supervisor at Kyokko News.
Sasakura Yasuharu
The 68-year-old incumbent prime minister at the time of the Ginza Incident in Gate: Zero.
