= USS Aurore II =

Patrol vessel of the United States Navy

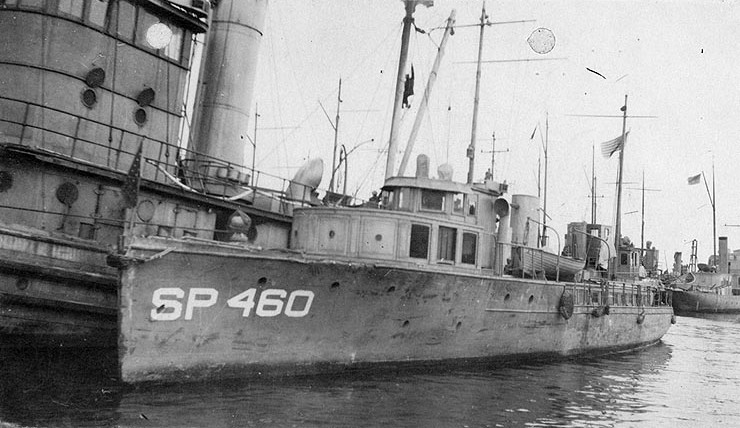
- USS SP-460, ex-USS Aurore II (SP-460), in port ca. 1918

History

United States
- Name: USS Aurore II (1917–1918); USS SP-460 (1918–1919)
- Namesake: Aurore II was her previous name retained; SP-460 was her section patrol number
- Builder: Luders Marine Construction Company, Stamford, Connecticut
- Completed: 1916
- Acquired: 10 August 1917
- Commissioned: 1 October 1917
- Decommissioned: 12 August 1919
- Fate: Sold 24 September 1919
- Notes: Operated as private yacht Aurore II 1916-1917

General characteristics
- Type: Patrol vessel
- Tonnage: 85 gross register tons
- Length: 96 ft 3 in (29.34 m)
- Beam: 18 ft 0 in (5.49 m)
- Draft: 5 ft 0 in (1.52 m) mean
- Propulsion: Steam engine or gasoline engine, two shafts
- Speed: 12 knots
- Complement: 16
- Armament: 1 × 3-pounder gun 1 × 1-pounder gun; 3 × machine guns

USS Aurore II (SP-460) was a United States Navy patrol vessel in commission from 1917 to 1919.

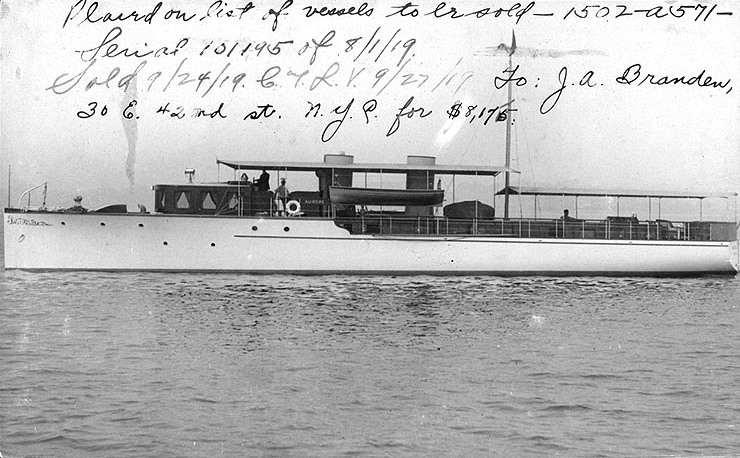
Aurore II in private use in 1916 or 1917.

Aurore II was built as a private steam yacht or motorboat of the same name in 1916 by the Luders Marine Construction Company at Stamford, Connecticut. On 10 August 1917, the U.S. Navy purchased Aurore II from Stuart Wyeth of Philadelphia, Pennsylvania, for use as a section patrol vessel during World War I. She was commissioned at the Philadelphia Navy Yard as USS Aurore II (SP-460) on 1 October 1917.

Assigned to the 4th Naval District, Aurore II—renamed USS SP-460 in April 1918—operated in the Delaware River estuary and in coastal waters in the Delaware Capes area for the remainder of World War I and into 1919. She carried out patrol duties, served as a dispatch boat, and transported passengers. SP-460 was decommissioned on 12 August 1919 and sold on 24 September 1919 to Mr. J. A. Branden of New York City.
