= Lorelei (name) =

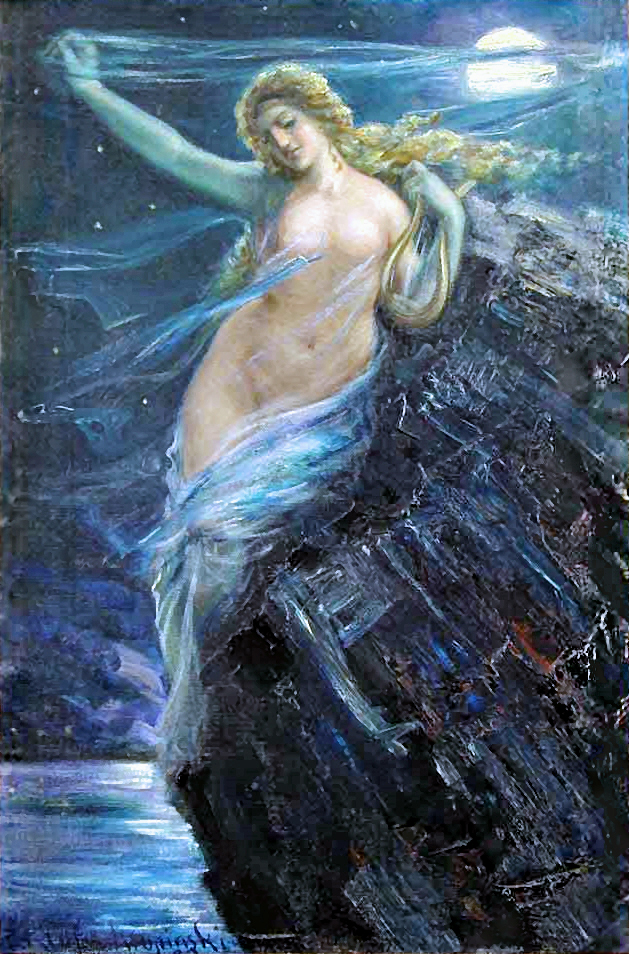
- Loreley, Emil Krupa-Krupinski, 1899
- Gender: Feminine

Other names
- Related names: Lorelai (variant spelling)

Lorelei (sometimes spelled Lorelai, Loreley, or Lorilee) is a feminine given name originating from the name of the rock headland on the Rhine River. Legends say that a maiden named Lorelei lived on the rock and lured fishermen to their deaths with her song.

== People ==
- Loreley, pen name of Mexican writer María Luisa Garza (1887–1980)
- Lorelei DeCora Means (born 1954), a Native American nurse and civil rights activist
- Lorelei Linklater (born 1994), American actress and multimedia artist
- Lorelei King, American actress, screenwriter and development executive
- Luisana Loreley Lopilato de la Torre (born 1987), Argentine actress and model

== Fictional characters ==
- Lorelei (Asgardian), a character in the Marvel Comics Universe and the Marvel Cinematic Universe
- Lorelei (A Court of Silver Flames), one of the Valkyries and priestesses in the book series A Court of Thorns and Roses by Sarah J. Maas
- Lorelei, an Elite Four member in Pokémon Red, Blue, and Yellow, Pokémon FireRed and LeafGreen, and Pokémon: Let's Go, Pikachu! and Let's Go, Eevee!
- Lorelei Ambrosia, a character in Superman III
- Lorelai Gilmore, and daughter Lorelai 'Rory' Gilmore, characters on the American television series Gilmore Girls
- Lorelei Lee, Marilyn Monroe's character in Gentlemen Prefer Blondes
- Lorelei Martins, a character who was an accomplice and later a victim of Red John in the television series The Mentalist
- Lorelei Tsing, a doctor from American science fiction television series The 100
- Mystia Lorelei, a character in Imperishable Night from the video game franchise, Touhou Project
- Lorelei Lee Long, a character in the books Time Enough for Love and The Number of the Beast (novel) by Robert A. Heinlein.

== Other fictional uses ==
- A Star Trek: The Animated Series episode entitled "The Lorelei Signal" involved alien women able to mentally enslave the men of the U.S.S. Enterprise.
