= Aurora Martinez =

Mexican-American movie director

Aurora 'Rory' Martínez, usually credited simply as “Rory,” is the credited director of tens of publicly released movies.

Martínez’s films are produced almost exclusively in Mexico, with dialogue in Spanish and marketed to the Latin American population. Although her productions receive virtually no theatrical release in the United States, they can be found in many U.S. video outlets, both in VHS and DVD format.

Martínez’s movies are generally in the action genre, concentrating on such staple themes as feuds between drug traffickers, illegal trade in human organs, and police investigations, and thus they are not of a kind that normally attracts the attention of foreign film critics. The two facts aforesaid likely explain why she is virtually unknown in the English-speaking world, despite her highly prolific output.

Martínez appears on screen in many of her movies, though almost never in a leading role. She has often cast Mario Almada in leading roles including, Tijuana, ciudad de narcos in 1998. Her movies tend to portray extreme, explicit violence.

== Private life ==
She resides in Chicago and is married to Christian Guajardo and owns a dog.

== List of films directed ==
The following list of Martínez’s credited works, almost certainly incomplete, is presented in alphabetical order because in many cases the date of their release is unavailable.

- 10 Horas Para Morir
- Amarga Venganza
- Ambición sin Piedad
- Cacería Mortal
- Cárcel de Mujeres [Reclusorio de Cabronas]
- Cave Una Tumba Para Mi Madre
- Cholos Empericados
- Cholos Empericados 2
- Con el Odio en el Sangre
- Con Mis Propias Manos
- Con Toda El Arma
- Condenados a Morir
- Dinero, Traición, y Crímen
- El Cártel de la Blanca
- El Cártel de Osiel
- El Chingón del Vicio
- El Corrido de la Muerte Vuelve el Rayo
- El Fantasma de la Coca
- El Judas del Diablo
- El Patrón de Michoacán
- El Pueblo de la Muerte
- El Regreso de Camelia la Chicana
- El Séptimo Asalto
- El Ultimo Narco del Cártel de Juárez
- Eran Cabrones Los Secuestradores
- Error Mortal
- Escoría Oltra Parte de Tí
- Estuches de Madera
- Gringa, Gringa, El Se Apendeja Se Chinga
- Herencia Homicida
- Justicia para un Criminal
- La Banda del Trans Am Rojo
- La Fuga del Penal de Apatzingán
- La Licensiada Blindada
- La Malnacida
- La Sentencia de Juán de la Sierra
- La Venganza del Gato de Michoacán
- La Verdadera Historia de Jonas Arango
- Las 7 Muertas
- Linchamiento
- Los Hijos de Sátanas
- Maten A Esas Pinches Narcas
- Me Gusta Pegarle al Polvo
- Muerto el Perro se Acabó la Rabia
- Mujeres Divinas
- Narcas vs. Judiciales
- Odio de Narco
- Pa’ Que Te Acuerdes de Mí Maldita
- Pablo Metralla
- Plebes Asesinos
- Por Perra Y Traícionera
- Precio a su Cabeza
- Sueños de Muerte
- Tarot Sangriento
- Te Ando Buscando pa’ Partirte la Madre
- Tereno Prohibido
- Todo Personal
- Traficantes de Muerte
- Traíción con Traíción se Paga
- Transplandes Ilegales
- Tras las Rejas . . . Por Culero
- Triste Juventud
- Un Asesinato Perfecto
- Un Mexicano Mojado
- Venganza Silenciosa
- Vengarse Matando
- Viejo Ojete – de Avaro te Quebraron
- Violador Homicida
- Violencia en la Ciudad
- Vuelve el Botas de Avestruz
- Ya Basta de Tanta Perreada
- Ya Te Cargó El Payaso
