= María Luisa Garza =

Mexican writer (1887–1980)

- Born: María Luisa Garza Garza; August 25, 1887; Cadereyta Jiménez
- Died: 1980 (aged 92–93)
- Spouse: Adolfo Cantú Jáuregui
- Children: Adolfo, Magdalena, Federico, and Diana
- Writing career
- Pen name: Loreley
- Genres: novels, poetry

María Luisa Garza Garza (August 25, 1887, Cadereyta Jiménez – 1980) was a Mexican journalist and novelist, who wrote under the pen name "Loreley".

== Biography ==
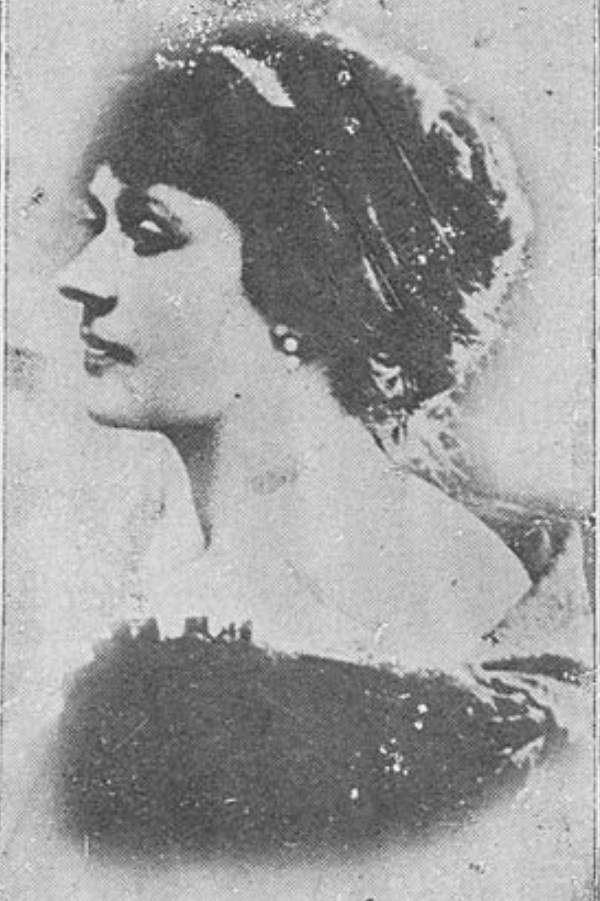
María Luisa Garza (1885-1980)

Garza was the daughter of Francisco Garza González and Petra Garza Quintanilla. She was married to the physician and writer Adolfo Cantú Jáuregui. They had four children. Her son Federico was a notable artist. Her daughter Diana was married to the photographer, scriptwriter, director and producer Gilberto Martínez Solares.

During the Mexican Revolution Garza moved to Texas, where she lived in San Antonio, and wrote for the papers La Pensa, La Época and El Imparcial de Texas in the 1920s. She also founded the journal Alma Femenina and was involved in the literary movement of the Generation of El México Afuera. She was also president of the Cruz Azul Mexicana (Mexican Blue Cross), a volunteer organization that provided medical care to the Mexican community on the United States side.

When she returned to her home country, she lived in Monterrey and worked in education, and held some posts as secretary or director. She wrote for the paper El Universal Gráfico and the weekly paper Renacimiento. In 1923 she was invited by general Álvaro Obregón and José Vasconcelos to Mexico City, where she met Gabriela Mistral, who became a good friend of hers. Garza was founder of the Instituto Nacional de Protección a la Infancia (INPI).

The Escuela Primaria Federal María Luisa Garza Loreley, a primary school in her hometown, is named in honor of her. In El Salvador a theatre was named after her.

== Works ==
- La novia de Nervo, novel, 1922
- Los Amores de Gaona, 1922
- Alas y quimeras, novel, 1924
- Escucha, 1928
- Hojas Dispersas
- Téntaculos de fuego
- Soñando un hijo, 1937
