= Aurora (disambiguation) =

An aurora is a natural light display in the sky on Earth seen predominantly in the high latitudes.

Aurora may also refer to:

== Common uses ==
- Aurora (mythology), the Roman goddess of dawn
- Aurora (given name), a feminine given name (and list of people with the name)
- Aurora (heraldry), the heraldic display of an aurora

== Places ==
=== Brazil ===
- Aurora, Ceará
- Aurora, Santa Catarina

=== Philippines ===
- Aurora (province), in the Philippines
- Aurora, Isabela
- Aurora, Zamboanga del Sur

=== Romania ===
- Aurora, Cujmir, Mehedinți County
- Cap Aurora, Mangalia, Constanța County

=== United States ===
- Aurora, Arkansas
- Aurora, Colorado
- Aurora, Illinois
- Aurora, Indiana
- Aurora, Iowa
- Aurora, Kansas
- Aurora, Kentucky
- Aurora, New Orleans, Louisiana
- Aurora, Maine
- Aurora, Minnesota
- Aurora Township, Steele County, Minnesota
- Aurora, Missouri
- Aurora, Nebraska
- Aurora, Nevada
- Aurora, Cayuga County, New York
- Aurora, Erie County, New York
- Aurora, North Carolina
- Aurora, Ohio
- Aurora, Oregon
- Aurora County, South Dakota
- Aurora, South Dakota
- Aurora, Texas
- Aurora, Utah
- Aurora, West Virginia
- Aurora, Florence County, Wisconsin, a town
- Aurora (community), Florence County, Wisconsin, an unincorporated community
- Aurora, Kenosha County, Wisconsin
- Aurora, Taylor County, Wisconsin
- Aurora, Washington County, Wisconsin
- Aurora, Waushara County, Wisconsin

=== Other places ===
- Aurora, Victoria, Australia
- Aurora, Ontario, Canada
- Aurora (Turin), Italy
- Aurora Cave, New Zealand
- Aurora, Western Cape, South Africa
- Aurora, Suriname
- Aurora Island or Maéwo, Vanuatu
- Aurora Islands, phantom isles (once considered near the Falklands)

=== Education ===
- Aurora University, Illinois, US
- Aurora University (Shanghai), China
- Aurora College, Northwest Territories, Canada
- Aurora College (Invercargill), New Zealand
- Community College of Aurora, Colorado, US

=== Structures ===
- Aurora (Spencer, Virginia), a historic home near Spencer, Patrick County, Virginia, US
- Aurora Apartment Hotel, a historic high-rise building in San Antonio, Texas, US
- Aurora Bridge, Seattle, Washington, US
- Aurora, Dichteren, a windmill in Gelderland, Netherlands
- Aurora Melbourne Central, a skyscraper in Melbourne, Australia
- Aurora Place, a skyscraper in Sydney, Australia
- Aurora Stadium, Launceston, Australia
- Aurora Tower, a skyscraper in Brisbane, Australia
- Aurora Wheel, a Ferris wheel in Kuwana, Mie Prefecture, Japan

== Arts and entertainment ==
=== Visual arts ===
- Aurora (Artemisia Gentileschi), a c1625-1627 painting by Artemisia Gentileschi
- Aurora (Reni), a 1614 Baroque ceiling fresco by Guido Reni
- Aurora (di Suvero), a 1992 sculpture by Mark di Suvero
- Aurora (Asawa), Ruth Asawa sculpture

=== Books ===
- Prix Aurora Awards, a Canadian literature award
- Aurora, a novel by Michel Leiris
- Aurora, a novel by David Koepp
- Aurora (novel), 2015, by Kim Stanley Robinson
- Aurora, an airship in the novel Airborn
- Aurora-Verlag, a New York-based German language publisher co-founded in 1944 by Lion Feuchtwanger
- Aurora (comics), a Marvel comics character

=== Periodicals ===
- Aurora (literary journal), published from 1821 to 1837
- Aurora (newspaper), an 1899–1957 Swedish publication
- Aurora de Chile, the first periodical in Chilean history
- Philadelphia Aurora, a newspaper published from 1794 to 1824

=== Film and television ===
- Aurora (1984 film), an Italian drama
- Aurora (2006 film), a Ukrainian film
- Aurora (2010 film), a Romanian crime story
- Aurora (2014 film), a Chilean film
- Aurora (2018 Filipino film), a Philippine film
- Aurora (2018 Kyrgyz film), a Kyrgyzstani film
- Aurora (2019 film), a Finnish film
- Aurora (TV series), a Spanish-language telenovela
- "Aurora" (Stargate Atlantis), an episode of Stargate Atlantis
- Aurora Community Channel, an Australian TV channel
- Aurora (Sleeping Beauty), the title character from the animated film Sleeping Beauty
- Princess Aurora, the Sleeping Beauty character in Once Upon a Time

=== Gaming ===
- Aurora (video game), a 4X video game
- Aurora Engine, a BioWare game engine
- Aurora Gaming, a Serbian esports organization
- Sega Aurora, a gaming hardware platform
- Aurora, a gaming PC brand by Alienware
- Aurora, the main protagonist from the role-playing video game Child of Light
- The Aurora, a crashed spaceship in the survival adventure game Subnautica

=== Music ===
==== Works ====
- Aurora (opera), 1908, by Ettore Panizza
- Aurora (tone poem), an orchestral tone poem by William Lloyd Webber

==== Bands and artists ====
- Aurora (singer) (born 1996), Norwegian singer-songwriter
- Aurora (Christian band), an American/British girl group
- Aurora (electronic music group), a British group
- Aurora (punk band), a Hungarian group
- Aurora, a German dark wave band later known as Aurora Sutra

==== Albums ====
- Aurora (Angela Chang album), 2004
- Aurora (Antiskeptic album), 2003
- Aurora (Asia album), 1986
- Aurora (Aurora album), 2000
- Aurora (Bada album), 2004
- Aurora (Breaking Benjamin album), 2020
- Aurora (Daisy Jones & the Six album), 2023
- Aurora (Esmerine album), 2005
- Aurora (Jean-Luc Ponty album), 1976
- Aurora (Nico Touches the Walls album), 2009
- Aurora (Susumu Hirasawa album), 1994
- Aurora (Ben Frost album), 2014
- Aurora (Bea Miller album), 2018
- Aurora (Yes album), 2026
- Aurora, 2009, by Avishai Cohen
- Aurora, 1995, by Crash Vegas
- Aurora, 2013, by Joey Moe
- Aurora, 2023, by Nikolija

==== Songs ====
- "Aurora" (Daniela Lalita song), 2026
- "Aurora" (Foo Fighters song), 1999
- "Aurora" (Lights Action song), 2008
- "Aurora", by 36 Crazyfists from Rest Inside the Flames
- "Aurora", by the Andrews Sisters
- "Aurora", by Ateez from Treasure EP.3: One to All
- "Aurora", by Björk from Vespertine
- "Aurora", by Ensiferum from Winter Storm
- "L'aurora", by Eros Ramazzotti from Dove c'è musica
- "Aurora", by Gloria Trevi from De Película
- "Aurora", by Hans Zimmer
- "Aurora", by Hope for the Dying from Legacy
- "Aurora", by Lapush from Someplace Closer to Here
- "Aurora", by Susumu Hirasawa from Aurora
  - "Aurora 2", a Susumu Hirasawa remix of "Aurora" from Solar Ray
- "Aurora", by Vanessa Mae from Storm
- "Aurora", by Moka Only from I'm Delighted
- "Aurora", by Veruca Salt from Tank Girl

== Organizations ==
- Aurora (pen manufacturer), an Italian manufacturer
- Aurora Cannabis, a Canadian licensed producer of medical cannabis
- Aurora Energy (disambiguation), various electricity companies
- Aurora Film Corporation, an Indian film production and distribution company
- Aurora Flight Sciences (a.k.a. Aurora), flight research subsidiary of Boeing
- Aurora Health Care, a health care system in Wisconsin, US
- Aurora Innovation, an American self-driving car company
- Aurora (university network), a network of European universities
- Aurora Plastics Corporation, a defunct American toy and hobby company
- Aurora Productions, Hollywood, an American film production house
- Aurora Publishing (Hungary), a German-Hungarian publishing company
- Aurora Publishing (United States), the American subsidiary of Japanese publisher Ohzora Publishing
- Aurora (chain), a Ukrainian chain of shops

== Science and technology ==
=== Astronomy ===
- 94 Aurora, an asteroid
- Aurora 7, the second American spacecraft to orbit the Earth
- Aurora Flight Sciences (a.k.a. Aurora), flight research subsidiary of Boeing
- Aurora on Mars, an atmospheric phenomenon on Mars
- Aurora programme, a human spaceflight programme of the European Space Agency
- Aurora, an albedo feature on Mercury

=== Biology ===
- Aurora (genus), a synonym of a genus of sponges
- Aurora, a synonym of the moth genus Peoria (moth)
- Aurora kinase, an enzyme
- Aurora (grape) or Aurore, a hybrid wine grape variety

=== Computing ===
==== High performance computing ====
- Aurora (supercomputer), a Exascale-class supercomputer at the U.S.-based Argonne National Laboratory
- Aurora, a supercomputer produced by Eurotech
- NEC SX-Aurora TSUBASA, a vector processing architecture from NEC
- Amazon Aurora, a high-performance database developed by Amazon

==== Other uses in computing ====
- Apache Aurora, a Mesos framework for both long-running services and cron jobs
- Aurora (typeface), a serif font
- Mobile OS Aurora, a Russian operating system spun off from Sailfish
- Aurora OS, formerly named Eeebuntu OS, a discontinued Ubuntu-based OS for netbooks
- Aurora (protocol), a communications protocol from Xilinx
- Aurora Generator Test, a 2007 experiment by Idaho National Laboratory
- Aurora HDR, high-dynamic-range software for photography
- Operation Aurora, a 2009 cyber attack
- Aurora, a text-to-image model used by Grok (chatbot) and developed by xAI
- Aurora, a tablet in the NOVO7 series
- Aurora, a version of the Firefox browser
- AURORA, an entrant in the NIST hash function competition

== Transportation ==
=== Aerospace ===
- Aurora (aircraft), a rumored American reconnaissance aircraft
- Aurora (airline), a Russian airline
- Aurora D8, an airliner concept currently under development
- Lockheed CP-140 Aurora, a maritime patrol aircraft used by the Royal Canadian Air Force
- Aurora Space Station, a concept for a commercial space station
- Aurora Flight Sciences (a.k.a. Aurora), flight research subsidiary of Boeing

=== Automobiles ===
- Aurora (1957 automobile), an American automobile
- Aurora Solar Car
- Huanghai Aurora, a Chinese mid-size SUV
- Oldsmobile Aurora, a full-size sedan made from 1995 to 2003
- Zenvo Aurora, a Danish sports car

=== Rail ===
- Aurora station (disambiguation), stations named Aurora
- Aurora Borealis Express, Helsinki‒Kolari night train in Finland
- Aurora (CityNightLine), Switzerland‒Germany‒Denmark night train
- Aurora (Trans Europ Express) service, in Italy
- Aurora Winter Train, seasonal passenger service on the Alaska Railroad
- Aurora, a locomotive of the South Devon Railway Comet class in Britain
- Aurora, brand name for British Rail Class 810 passenger trains

=== Road ===
- Aurora Boulevard, a major thoroughfare in Quezon City and San Juan City, Metro Manila
- Aurora Avenue, Seattle, Washington

=== Watercraft ===
- List of ships named Aurora

== Sports ==
- Aurora Formula One, a motor racing championship
- Aurora F.C., a Guatemalan football club
- Aurora FC (Canada), a Canadian soccer club
- Club Aurora, a Bolivian football club
- FBC Aurora, a Peruvian football club
- Aurora Seriate Calcio, a defunct Italian football club
- Aurora Pro Patria 1919, an Italian football club
- S.P. Aurora, a defunct Sammarinese football club

== Other uses ==
- Jagjit Singh Aurora (1916–2005), Indian soldier
- Aurora Prize for Awakening Humanity, an international humanitarian award
- Aurora Solar Thermal Power Project, a proposed solar-powered electricity generator in South Australia

== See also ==
- La Aurora (disambiguation)
- Aurora Airport (disambiguation)
- Aurore (disambiguation)
- Arora (disambiguation)
- Avrora (disambiguation)
