= Aurora Network =

Aurora Network may refer to:

- Aurora (university network), a network of European universities
- A subsidiary of 37Games

== See also ==
- Aurora (disambiguation)
