= Aurora, Wisconsin =

Aurora is the name of some places in the U.S. state of Wisconsin:

- Aurora, Florence County, Wisconsin, a town
- Aurora (community), Florence County, Wisconsin, an unincorporated community
- Aurora, Kenosha County, Wisconsin, a ghost town of Kenosha County, Wisconsin
- Aurora, Taylor County, Wisconsin, a town
- Aurora, Washington County, Wisconsin, an unincorporated community
- Aurora, Waushara County, Wisconsin, a town
- Auroraville, Wisconsin, an unincorporated community
