= Shifu (disambiguation) =

Shifu or sifu (师父 or 师傅) is a Chinese title for a teacher or skilled tradesman.

Shifu may also refer to:

- The Final Master (Shifu), 2015 Chinese film
- Liu Shifu (劉師復), Chinese anarchist and Esperantist, sometimes mononymously known as Shifu
- Master Shifu, character in the Kung Fu Panda franchise
- Shifu (Stargate), recurring character in Stargate SG-1
- Shifu Road (市府路), major thoroughfare in Xinyi District, Taipei, Taiwan
- ShiFu, a browser-based massively multiplayer online role-playing game made by 37Games
- Sifu (video game), a 2022 action-adventure video game
