= Auroran =

Auroran may refer to:

- a person who lives in or comes from one of the many geographical locations throughout the world named Aurora
- a fictional empire in the Escape Velocity Nova computer game
- a type of daedra in The Elder Scrolls computer game series.
