= La Aurora =

La Aurora may refer to:

- La Aurora de Chile, the first periodical in Chilean history
- La Aurora International Airport, the main airport in Guatemala City, Guatemala
- La Aurora Zoo, a zoo in Guatemala City
- La Aurora station, a Metrocable station in Medellín, Colombia
- "La Aurora", the Spanish version of "L'Aurora" by Eros Ramazzotti

== See also ==
- Aurora (disambiguation)
