= Aurora Publishing =

Aurora Publishing may refer to:

- Aurora Publishing (United States), American publishing company of Japanese manga
- Aurora Publishing (Hungary), German-Hungarian publishing company
