= Bigger than Us =

Bigger than Us may refer to:

- Bigger than Us (album), a 2001 album by Aurora
- "Bigger than Us" (Michael Rice song), a 2019 song by Michael Rice representing UK in the Eurovision Song Contest 2019
- "Bigger than Us" (White Lies song), a 2011 song by White Lies
- "Bigger than Us", a song by Miley Cyrus from her album Hannah Montana 2: Meet Miley Cyrus
- "Bigger than Us", a song by Josh Groban on the 2018 album Bridges
- Bigger Than Us (documentary), a 2021 documentary film directed by Flore Vasseur

== See also ==
- Bigger Than Both of Us
