= Hotel Aurora =

Hotel Aurora or Aurora Hotel may refer to:

== Chad ==
- Aurora Hotel (Chad)

== United States ==
- Aurora Apartment Hotel, a high-rise apartment building in San Antonio, Texas
- Aurora Hotel (Worcester, Massachusetts), listed on the NRHP in Massachusetts
- Hotel Aurora (Aurora, Illinois), listed on the NRHP in Illinois
