= Dodô (footballer, born June 1987) =

Brazilian footballer

Personal information
- Full name: Sandro Ferreira André
- Date of birth: 20 June 1987 (age 39)
- Place of birth: Aurora, Ceará, Brazil
- Height: 1.77 m (5 ft 10 in)
- Position: Midfielder

Senior career*
Years	Team	Apps	(Gls)
2009–2011	Icasa	70	(5)
2011–2013	Atlético Goianiense	90	(3)
2014–2015	Ponte Preta	7	(2)
2015	Paykan	9	(0)
2015–2018	Giresunspor	93	(6)
2018–2019	Qatar SC	20	(1)
2019–2020	Boluspor	18	(0)
2022	Iguatu	15	(0)
2022	Afogados	3	(0)
- * Club domestic league appearances and goals as of 21:40, 6 December 2023 (UTC)~

Sandro Ferreira André Nascimento (born 1987) or Dodô is a Brazilian professional footballer who plays as a midfielder.
