= Hleb =

Hleb may refer to:

- Alexander Hleb (born 1981), Belarusian footballer
- Vyacheslav Hleb (born 1983), Belarusian footballer
- Hleb Harbuz (born 1994), Belarusian handball player
- Hleb, Leningrad album
