= Star Union (game developer) =

Chinese video game company

- Native name: 星合
- Company type: Limited
- Industry: Video games
- Founded: May 9, 2019; 7 years ago in Chengdu, China
- Headquarters: Chengdu, China
- Number of employees: 900 (2022)
- Website: www.staruniongame.com/en

Star Union ( Chinese: 星合 ),, also known as Chengdu Starunion Interactive Entertainment Technology Co, and StarFortune, is a Chinese mobile game developing and publishing company based in Chengdu. Founded in 2019, the company is known for manufacturing SLG's, also known as Simulated Life Games, with animal themes.

== History ==
The company was founded on May 9, 2019. It received angel funding from Tencent in 2020, and then later funding from 37Games in 2022. The Ants: Underground Kingdom was Star Union's first product, and it has been a significant source of income for the company.

== Revenue ==
By 2025, the company had acquired 2 billion yuan from overseas markets. In addition, in 2023 The Ministry of Commerce of China selected The Ants: Underground Kingdom as a key project for the countries national export.

== Subsidiaries ==
=== StarFortune ===
StarFortune Interactive Entertainment Technology Co. was established in Hong Kong on March 26, 2021.

== Games released ==
| Year | Title | Developer(s) | Platform(s) |
|---|---|---|---|
| 2019 | The Ants: Underground Kingdom | StarUnion | Android, IOS |
| 2021 | Beasts & Puzzles: Awakening (Note: The game was removed from online stores.) | StarUnion | Android |
| 2022 | Myths of Moonrise | StarFortune | Android, IOS |
| 2022 | Return of Shadow | StarFortune | Android, IOS |
| 2023 | Nations of Darkness | StarFortune | Android, IOS |
| 2023 | Beast Lord: The New Land | StarFortune | Android, IOS |
| 2024 | World of Water | StarFortune | Android, IOS |
| 2024 | Top Fish: Ocean Game | StarFortune | Android, IOS |
| 2025 | Zoo City: Dominion | StarFortune | Android |
| 2025 | CatDog World: After Humans | StarFortune | Android, IOS |
| 2025 | MyStory: Be the Heroine | StarFortune | Android, IOS |
| 2025 | Solitaire Connections | StarFortune | Android |
| 2025 | Revenge of Gangster | StarFortune | Android, IOS |
| 2026 | Dawn Watch: Survival | StarFortune | Android, IOS |
| 2026 | Last Furry: Survival (early access) | StarUnion | Android, IOS |
| 2026 | Fortune Hunter: Golden Saga | StarFortune | Android |
| 2026 | Hope Zone | StarFortune | Android |
