= József Molnár =

József Molnár may refer to:

- József Molnár (painter) (1821–1899), Hungarian painter
- József Molnár (writer) (1918–2009), Hungarian writer, journalist, publisher and printer
