= Aurora Publishing (Hungary) =

Aurora Publishing was a German-Hungarian publishing company, established in 1963 in Munich by József Molnár. It published 2 to 3 volumes annually, which, until 1983, were printed in-house. They published some 60 volumes until 1990, and the volumes are grouped into sets, "Aurora Kiskönyvtár" and "Aurora Kiskönyvek". Molnár also published a series on church history entitled Dissertationes Hungaricae ex historia Ecclesiae. In some volumes, Aurora Publishing is sometimes simply listed as Aurora or even as Molnár Ny (=Molnár Nyomda) or Molnár. The reason for the existence of Aurora disappeared with the fall of communism. Molnár endeavoured to publish the works of contemporary émigré Hungarian authors, including:

- Gyula Borbándi
- György Ferdinándy
- Gyula Gombos
- Győző Határ
- Elemér Illyés
- István Jákli
- Oszkár Jászi
- Vilmos Juhász
- Alajos Kannás
- Varga Sándor Kibédi
- Menyhért Kiss
- Valéria Korek
- Géza Lakatos
- Lajos Major-Zala
- Csaba Mánfai
- Póli Marczali
- Margit Mikes
- Ágnes Mirtse
- Dezső Monoszlóy
- Jenő Muzsnay
- Kázmér Nagy
- Béla Padányi-Gulyás
- Rezső Peéry
- Gábor Salacz
- Mátyás Sárközi
- Vilmos Schidt
- László Cs. Szabó
- József Szamosi
- Ferenc Tolvaly
- Györgyi Vándor
