= Babye leto =

Studio album by Leningrad
- Released: 2006
- Genre: Ska punk
- Label: Misteriya zvuka

Leningrad chronology
Huinya (2005)	Babye leto (2006)	Avrora (2007)

Babye leto (Russian: Бабье лето, meaning 'Indian Summer'), is an album by the Russian band Leningrad, released in 2006. In a review for Afisha magazine, Maxim Semelyak thought that while the band was as energetic as previous outings, their style was no longer interesting. Rolling Stone Russia gave the album 3 out of 5 stars in their review.

== Track listing ==
1. "По пабам" – Po pabam (To pubs) – 2:27
2. "Любовь" – Lyubov (Love) – 2:32
3. "Карлсон" – Karlson – 2:18
4. "Дача" – Dacha (Cottage) – 3:02
5. "Губошлёп" – Guboshlyop (Bullshitter) – 2:48
6. "Без мата"- Bez mata (Without swearing) – 2:17
7. "Высоко и низко" – Vysoko i nizko (High and low) – 2:43
8. "Никулин" – Nikulin – 2:46
9. "Лайф из фак" – Layf iz fak (Russian transliteration of "Life is fuck") – 2:25
10. "Когда есть деньги" – Kogda est dengi (When there's money)- 2:28
11. "В воду" – V vodu (Into the water) – 2:19
12. "Пару баб" – Paru bab (Some bitches) – 2:55
13. "Внедорожник" – Vnedorozhnik (Off-road vehicle) – 3:07
14. "По-любому" – Po-lyubomu (Definitely) – 2:54
15. "Женьщины" – Zhenshchiny (Women) – 1:53
16. "П и Х" – P i H (abbreviation of Пизда и Хуй (Pizda i Huy) – Cunt & Dick) – 3:15
