= 1985–86 Campionato Sammarinese di Calcio =

Edition of a Football tournament

Campionato Sammarinese di Calcio
- Season: 1985–86
- Champions: S.C. Faetano

The 1985–86 Campionato Sammarinese di Calcio season was the 1st season since its establishment. Seventeen teams competed and S.C. Faetano won the championship.

== League standings ==
Pos	Team	Pld	W	D	L	GF	GA	GD	Pts	Qualification or relegation
1	S.C. Faetano	16	10	6	0	48	15	+33	26	Champions
2	S.S. San Giovanni	16	10	5	1	20	5	+15	25	
3	S.P. La Fiorita	16	10	4	2	34	9	+25	24	
4	S.S. Montevito	16	10	3	3	27	12	+15	23	
5	S.P. Cailungo	16	7	5	4	34	22	+12	19	
6	A.C. Libertas	16	5	9	2	20	17	+3	19	
7	S.P. Tre Penne	16	7	4	5	20	18	+2	18	
8	G.S. Dogana	16	5	7	4	21	21	0	17	
9	S.S. Murata	16	7	2	7	18	21	−3	16	
10	S.S. Folgore/Falciano	16	4	6	6	20	25	−5	14	Relegation to the Serie A2
11	S.P. Domagnano	16	4	6	6	12	19	−7	14	Relegation to the Serie A2
12	S.S. Cosmos	16	4	5	7	20	23	−3	13	Relegation to the Serie A2
13	S.P. Tre Fiori	16	3	7	6	17	21	−4	13	Relegation to the Serie A2
14	S.P. Aurora	16	2	6	8	20	44	−24	10	Relegation to the Serie A2
15	S.S. Pennarossa	16	2	5	9	10	23	−13	9	Relegation to the Serie A2
16	S.S. Virtus	16	1	6	9	10	34	−24	8	Relegation to the Serie A2
17	S.S. Juvenes	16	0	4	12	13	35	−22	4	Relegation to the Serie A2

Source: rsssf.com

== Results ==
Home \ Away	AUR	CAI	COS	DOG	DOM	FAE	FOL	JUV	LFI	LIB	MON	MUR	PEN	SGI	TFI	TPE	VIR
Aurora		2–0	1–0	0–3	1–3	0–8	2–2	3–1	1–3	0–0	5–5	0–3	1–1	0–2	3–5	1–1	1–3
Cailungo			1–0	3–3	0–0	0–4	0–0	3–1	0–1	3–1	1–1	1–1	2–0	1–1	1–1	0–0	2–1
Cosmos				1–2	1–1	1–5	2–2	1–1	0–4	0–0	1–0	1–1	0–1	1–2	2–1	3–0	3–0
Dogana					2–2	1–4	0–1	4–2	0–0	1–4	0–0	1–0	0–0	1–2	1–0	1–1	1–1
Domagnano						5–1	0–1	2–2	2–1	2–3	0–2	0–1	2–0	0–0	2–1	1–3	2–2
Faetano							1–1	4–0	2–2	3–3	1–0	2–0	3–3	0–0	0–0	5–3	1–0
Folgore								2–1	0–5	1–2	0–1	0–2	2–1	0–1	0–0	0–1	0–0
Juvenes									1–2	0–1	2–3	0–3	0–2	1–3	1–1	0–1	1–1
La Fiorita										1–0	1–1	2–1	3–0	0–0	0–0	2–0	8–0
Libertas											0–4	7–0	2–2	0–2	3–0	2–2	6–1
Montevito												2–0	1–0	1–0	2–1	0–1	3–0
Murata													1–0	0–4	2–3	1–0	2–0
Pennarossa														0–2	0–1	0–3	0–0
San Giovanni															1–1	1–0	1–0
Tre Fiori																1–2	1–1
Tre Penne																	2–0
Virtus																	

Legend: Blue = home team win; Yellow = draw; Red = away team win.
