= Arora (disambiguation) =

Arora is an Indian community from the Punjab region. Arora may also refer to:

- Arora (surname)
- ARORA (vocal group)
- Uttradhi Arora, major subgroup of the Arora social caste in India
- Arora (web browser), a free and open source lightweight cross-platform web browser

== See also ==
- List of Aroras, a list of famous people of the Arora caste of the Punjab and Sindh
- Aror, former name of Rohri in Sindh, Pakistan
- Aurora (disambiguation)
