= Huinya =

Studio album by Leningrad
- Released: 2005
- Recorded: 2003
- Genre: Ska punk
- Label: Misteriya zvuka

Leningrad chronology
Khleb (2005)	Huinya (2005)	Babye leto (2006)

Huinya is a collaboration between the Russian band Leningrad and the British trio The Tiger Lillies. All but two of the songs are Tiger Lillies songs translated into Russian and performed by Leningrad; the remainder are Leningrad songs sung by The Tiger Lillies in English. The album was recorded in 2003 and released in 2005.

The title of the album means "bullshit". The Russian word "huinya" (хуйня) is part of Russian profanity, and means something useless, wrong or unknown. However, the album was released in Russia under the transliterated title "Huinya" (hence the "H" on the cover), which makes it somewhat less offensive compared to the Cyrillic spelling.

== Track listing ==
No.	Title	Length
1.	"Sud" (originally "The Crack of Doom")	3:10
2.	"Rvota" (originally "Fish Heads")	2:43
3.	"Huinya" (originally "Crap")	2:05
4.	"Vodka" (performed by Leningrad and The Tiger Lillies)	1:06
5.	"Ubiytsa" (originally "Killer")	3:56
6.	"V Ad" (originally "Hell")	2:22
7.	"Suka" (originally "Bitch")	3:13
8.	"Psikh" (performed by The Tiger Lillies)	1:49
9.	"Alkash" (originally "Swine")	1:48
10.	"Tvoy Mir" (originally "Your World")	2:14
11.	"Slyuni" (originally "Dribble")	2:30
12.	"V Bare" (originally "Bastard")	3:11
13.	"Nashe Shou" (originally "The Cheapest Show")	3:18
14.	"Alkash 2" (bonus track)	1:48
Total length:		39:23
