= Alajos Kannás =

Hungarian-American psychologist, writer and poet

Alajos Mihály Kannás (July 21, 1926, Kiskunhalas, Hungary – May 25, 1999, Los Angeles, United States) was a Hungarian-American psychologist, writer and poet.

== Study ==
He graduated from high school in Kiskunhalas in 1944. He actively participated with the youth, and began writing poetry. In his class in 1935 he received a good reward for his behavior and diligence. He studied at Péter Pázmány University in Budapest from 1945 to 1948 in literature and aesthetic. He wrote his doctoral thesis at the University of Vienna in 1960, after defending his psychology studies.

== Life ==
In 1948, he left Austria, and in 1951, he moved to the United States. In 1954, he returned to Europe, where he worked in France and Austria. In 1960, after completing his psychological studies in Austria, he returned to the United States, where he worked as a psychologist at a public hospital in Pomona, California. There, he developed an interest in Islam, and lived and worked in predominantly African American communities. His works have appeared, under a pseudonym, in the American Hungarian People's Voice, the Californian Hungarians, the South American Hungarian News, the Carib News, the Independent Hungary, the Literary Newspaper, The Young Generation (Munich), Hungary Life (Toronto and Melbourne) and even several periodicals.

== Published works ==
- Tíz év versei. Antológia. München. 1956.
- Kormos kövek. Róma. 1957.; München. 1988.; Budapest. 1991.
- Kettős alakban. München. 1958.
- Bécsi képeskönyv. Bécs. 1963.
- Miért is félnél? München: Aurora, 1963.
- A Napnyugat írói körének antológiája. Los Angeles. 1971. és 1979.
- Vándorének. (Nyugat-európai és tengerentúli magyar költők.) Szépirodalmi. Bp. 1981. 102–111. old.
