= Aurora Airport =

Aurora Airport may refer to:

- Aurora Municipal Airport (Illinois) in Aurora, Illinois, United States (FAA: ARR, IATA: AUZ)
- Aurora Municipal Airport (Nebraska) or Al Potter Field in Aurora, Nebraska, United States (FAA: AUH)
- Aurora State Airport in Aurora, Oregon, United States (FAA: UAO)
- Jerry Sumners Sr. Aurora Municipal Airport in Aurora, Missouri, United States (FAA: 2H2)
- La Aurora International Airport in Guatemala City, Guatemala (IATA: GUA, ICAO: MGGT)

== Airports in places named Aurora ==
- Buckley Space Force Base in Aurora, Colorado, United States (FAA/IATA: BKF)
- Aurora Airpark, former airport in Aurora, Colorado

== See also ==
- Aurora (disambiguation)
