= Avrora =

Avrora may refer to:

- Russian cruiser Aurora (Avrora), a Russian protected cruiser; currently a museum ship in St. Petersburg
- Avrora, Russian feminine name; a variant of Aurora
- Avrora, former name of Hirkan, a village in Lankaran District, Azerbaijan
- Avrora (album), 2007 album by the Russian band Leningrad
- Avrora (magazine), a Soviet literary magazine published in Leningrad; first to publish Roadside Picnic by brothers Strugatsky
- Avrora (train), express train which derailed in 1988
- Mobile OS Aurora (also romanized as "Avrora"), a Russian operating system spun off from Sailfish
