= Leningrad (band) =

Russian rock band

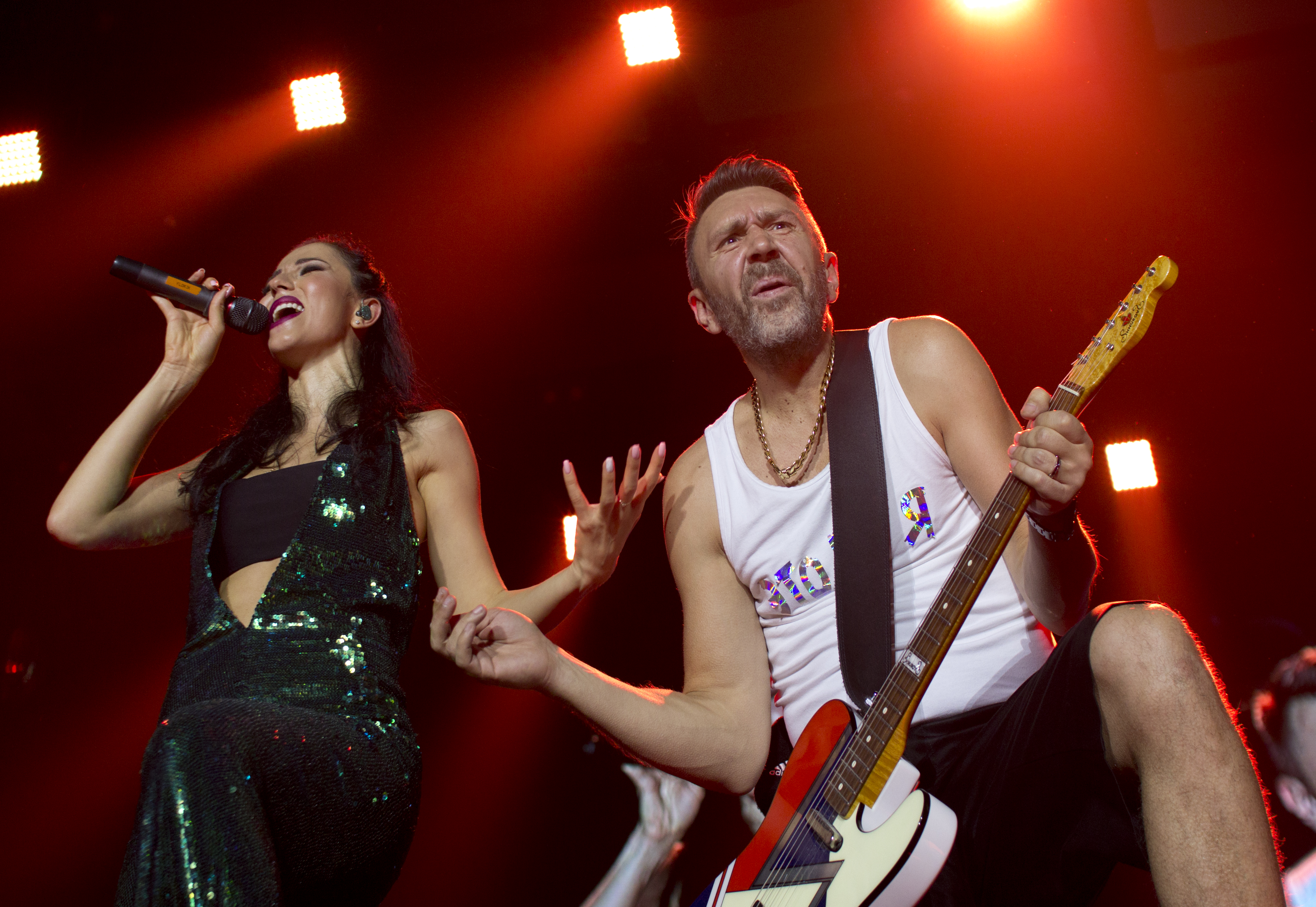
- Leningrad performing in 2017. Shnurov and Florida

Background information
- Also known as: Gruppirovka Leningrad
- Origin: Saint Petersburg, Russia
- Genres: Ska punk, Russian chanson, pop rock
- Years active: 1997–2008; 2010–present
- Labels: Gala Records; O.G.I. Records
- Members: Current line-up
- Past members: Past members
- Website: leningrad.top

Leningrad (Russian: Ленинград), also known as Gruppirovka Leningrad (Russian: Группировка "Ленинград") and Bandformirovanie Leningrad (Russian: Бандформирование "Ленинград"), is a popular Russian rock band from Saint Petersburg (formerly Leningrad), led by Sergey "Shnur" Shnurov.

Composed of 14 members, the band was founded in the late 1990s. Leningrad worked in Gypsy punk style and soon became notorious for vulgar lyrics (including much Russian mat) and celebration of drinking. As a result, most radio stations initially avoided the band, which did not stop Leningrad's growing popularity, partly for purely aesthetic reasons, such as the rich brass sound. The band eventually made its way to radio and TV (with profanity bleeped out). Shnurov even presented several New Year's Eve TV shows.

In 2007, the group began experimenting with female backup vocals, finally choosing jazz singer Yuliya Kogan as a permanent band member.

Leningrad disbanded in 2008, and then reunited in 2010. Several new songs and videos have been released since, most of them featuring lead vocals by Kogan rather than Shnurov.

Their music video Kolshchik, directed by Ilya Naishuller, won the Berlin Music Video Awards in 2017, taking the 1st place for the "Best Concept" Category. In 2018, Leningrad's music video Is not Paris, directed by Pavel Sidorov, was the winner of the Berlin Music Video Awards, winning also the "Best Narrative" category.

In March 2019, Shnurov announced, through his daily Instagram poem, that Leningrad would disband by the end of the year, after a farewell tour.

== Cultural impact ==
As Shnurov said himself: "Our songs are just about the good sides of life: vodka and girls that is."

The band was so disliked by the then-mayor of Moscow, Yury Luzhkov, that he cancelled all of its attempted large-scale events in the city during his term in office. Leningrad's numerous performances in Moscow were therefore limited to privately owned night clubs and bars.

A particular focus of the band's lyrics are mainstream cultural and political clichés. Kandidaty - pidory ("Candidates are faggots"), the refrain of their 2007 song "Vybory", became a widespread post-Soviet meme referring to electoral abstention. The 2010 song I Bolsche Nikovo ("And Nobody Else (That I Love")) addresses Saint Petersburg's intended image as "Russia's cultural capital", ridiculed with the use of mat and references to alcoholism and street crime.

Shnurov is also fond of ridiculing Russian pop music and pop rock by covering the songs of popular performers and then inviting them to appear with Leningrad live on stage.

== Soundtracks ==
Leningrad songs appeared in several popular pulp and crime films, notably DMB and Bimmer. Three songs by Leningrad appeared prominently on the soundtrack to the 2005 film Everything Is Illuminated. "Nikogo Ne Zhalko" ("No Pity for Anyone") is one of the songs used in an in-game radio station in the video game Grand Theft Auto IV. In 2015, Leningrad's song "Lastochka" was featured in the ending credits of the 2014 mockumentary film What We Do in the Shadows.

== Current line-up ==
- Sergey "Shnur" Shnurov (Сергей "Шнур" Шнуров) – vocals, arrangement, lyrics, guitar, bass (1997–2008, 2010–present)
- Vyacheslav "Sevych" Antonov (Вячеслав "Севыч" Антонов) – backing vocals, maracas (2000–2008, 2010–present)
- Aleksandr "Puzo" Popov (Александр "Пузо" Попов) – bass drum, percussion, vocals (1997–2008, 2010–present)
- Andrey "Antonych" Antonenko (Андрей "Антоныч" Антоненко) – tuba, arrangement, accordion, keyboards (1997–2008, 2010–present)
- Grigoriy "Zontik" Zontov (Григорий "Зонтик" Зонтов) – tenor saxophone (2002–2008, 2010–present)
- Roman "Shukher" Parygin (Роман "Шухер" Парыгин) – trumpet (2002–2008, 2010–present)
- Andrey "Ded" Kurayev (Андрей "Дед" Кураев) – bass (2002–2008, 2010–present)
- Ilya "Pianist" Rogachevskiy (Илья "Пианист" Рогачевский) – keyboard (2002–2008, 2010–present)
- Konstantin "Limon" Limonov (Константин "Лимон" Лимонов) – guitar (2002–2008, 2010–present)
- Vladislav "Valdik" Aleksandrov (Владислав "Валдик" Александров) – trombone (2002–2008, 2010–present)
- Aleksey Kanev "Lekha" (Алексей "Лёха" Канев) – baritone saxophone, alto saxophone (2002–2008, 2010–present)
- Denis Mozhin (Денис Можин) – sound director (2002–2008), drums (2010–present)
- Aleksey "Micksher" Kalinin (Алексей "Микшер" Калинин) – drums, percussion (1997–2002, 2006–2008, 2010–present)
- Dmitry Guguchkin (Дмитрий Гугучкин) – guitar (2010–present)
- Florida Chanturia (Флорида Чантурия) – vocals, backing vocals (2016–present)
- Viktor Rapotihin – violin (2016–present)

== Past members ==
- Yuliya "Yulia" Kogan (Юлия "Юля" Коган) – vocals, backing vocals (2007–2008, 2010–2013)
- Igor Vdovin (Игорь Вдовин) – vocal, guitar (1997–1999)
- Roman "Romero" Fockin (Роман "Ромеро" Фокин) – saxophone (1997–2002)
- Alexander "Sashko" Privalov (Александр "Сашко" Привалов) – trumpet (1998–2002)
- Oleg Sokolov (Олег Соколов) – trumpet (1997–1998)
- Vasiliy "Grasshopper" Savin (Василий "Кузнечик" Савин) – trombone (1998–2002)
- Dmitry "Antenna" Melnikov (Дмитрий "Антенна" Мельников) – drums (2000–2002)
- Ilya "Dracula" Ivashov (Илья "Дракула" Ивашов) – tuba (1997–2002)
- Stas Baretsky (Стас Барецкий) – dancing and mascot (2005–2008)
- Denis "Kashchey" Kuptsov (Денис "Кащей" Купцов) – drums (2002–2008)
- Michael Gopack (Михаил Гопак) – trombone (2002)
- Daniil "Dan" Kalashnick (Даниил "Дэн" Калашник) – guitar (1999–2002)
- Maxim Temnov (Максим Темнов) – bass, double bass (2001–2002)
- Sergei Arsenyev (Сергей Арсеньев) – accordion (2001)
- Alice Vox-Burmistrova (Алиса Вокс-Бурмистрова) – vocals, backing vocals (2012–2016)
- Vasilisa Starshova – vocals, backing vocals (2016–2017)

== Discography ==
Year	Title	Translation	Other information
1997	Пуля	Bullet	
1999	Мат без электричества	Mat without the electricity (idiomatically, "Mat Unplugged" or "Acoustic Mat")	
2000	Дачники	Dacha People	
2001	Пуля+ (Диск 1)	Bullet+ (Disc 1)	
2001	Пуля+ (Диск 2)	Bullet+ (Disc 2)	
2001	Маде ин жопа	Made in the Ass	
2002	Пираты XXI века	Pirates of the 21st Century	
2002	Точка	Point	Contains the song "Money"
2003	Ленинград уделывает Америку (Диск 1)	Leningrad does America (Disc 1)	
2003	Ленинград уделывает Америку (Диск 2)	Leningrad does America (Disc 2)	
2003	Второй Магаданский	Second Magadan	
2003	Для миллионов	For The Millions	Contains the song "Меня зовут Шнур"
2004	Бабаробот	Fembot	
2004	(Не) Полное собрание сочинений	(In)Complete Works	compilation
2005	Хуйня	Bullshit	Collaboration with The Tiger Lillies
2006	Хлеб	Bread	
2006	Бабье лето	Indian Summer	
2007	Аврора	Aurora	
2011	Хна	Henna	
2011	Вечный огонь	The Eternal Fire	
2012	Рыба	Fish	
2014	Фарш	Minced Meat	
2014	Пляж наш	The Beach Is Ours	
2018	Всякое	Random Things	Internet release

== Videography ==
- 2000: - "Когда нет денег" (When There Is No Money)
- 2002: - "WWW"
- 2003: - "Менеджер" (A Manager)
- 2003: - "Хуямба" (Huyamba)
- 2003: - "Распиздяй" (Raspizdyay) (Quitter)
- 2013: - "Родная" (Rodnaya) (Darling)
- 2013: - "Плачу" (Plachu) (I'm Crying)
- 2013: - "Сумка" (Sumka) (A Bag)
- 2014: - "Патриотка" (Patriotka) (A Patriotic Girl)
- 2015: - "Отпускная" (Otpusknaya) (Vacation Song)
- 2015: - "VIP"
- 2016: - "Экспонат" (Exhibit (aka Louboutins)) (Юлия Топольницкая (Yuliya Topolnitskaya), actress)
- September 1, 2016: - "Сиськи" (Tits) (Anna Parmas, director; Yuliya Topolnitskaya, actress)
- 2016: - "В Питере - пить" (V Pitere Pit') (To Drink in Saint Petersburg)
- 2016: - "Очки Собчак" (Ochki Sobchak) (Ksenia Sobchak's Glasses)
- 2016: - "Обезьяна и орел" (Obezyana i Oryol) (Monkey & Eagle)
- 2017: - "Ч.П.Х." (Ch.P.Kh.) (Totally Saint Peterburg's Stuff)
- 2017: - "Кольщик" (Kolshchik) (Tattoo Master) (Ilya Naishuller, director; Yuliya Topolnitskaya, actress))
- 2017: - "Вояж" (Voyage) (Ilya Naishuller; director)
- 2017: - "Экстаз" (Ecstasy) (Svetlana Khodchenkova; actress)
- 2017: - "Кандидат" (Candidate)
- 2018: - "Жу-Жу" feat. Glukoza ("Zhu Zhu") (Zoom Zoom)
- 2018: - "Золото" (Zoloto) (Gold)
- 2019: - "i_$uss" (Iisus) (Jesus) (Leonid Kolosovs'kyy; director)
- 2019: - "Кабриолет" (Cabriolet)
- 2020: - "Фотосессия" (Fotosessiya) (Fotosession)
- 2020: - "Миг" (Mig) (Moment)
- 2022: - "Пока так" (Poka tak) (Let it be for now)
- 2022: - "Покаянная" (Pokayannaya) (Penitential)
- 2022: - "Ритм и Мелодия" feat. Зоя (Ritm i Melodiya) (Rhythm and Melody)
- 2022: - "Па-спорт" (Pa-sport) (Pas-sport)
- 2022: - "Свободная касса" (Svobodnaya kassa) (Free cash register)
- 2022: - "Мерси, Баку" (Mersi, Baku) (Mercy, Baku) (Merci Beaucoup)
- 2022: - "Прощай, элита" (Proshchay, elita) (Goodbye, elite!)
- 2022: - "Входа нет!" (Vkhoda net!) (No entry!)
- 2022: - "А у олигархата" (A u oligarkhata...) (And the oligarchy...)
- 2022: - "Мелочи" (Melochi) (Little things)
- 2022: - "Геополитическая" (Geopoliticheskaya) (Geopolitical)
- 2022: - "Иноагент" (Inoagent) (Foreign agent)
- 2022: - "Наша экономика" (Nasha ekonomika) (Our economy)
