= Babarobot =

Studio album by Leningrad
- Released: 2004
- Genre: Ska punk, comedy rock
- Label: Misteriya zvuka

Leningrad chronology
Dlya millionov (2003)	Babarobot (2004)	(Ne) Polnoye sobraniye sochineniy (2004)

Babarobot (Russian: Бабаробот, meaning fembot), is a concept album by the Russian ska punk band, Leningrad, presented as a playful radio drama. The first track includes the other twelve songs of the album (Gelendzhik is repeated) with dialogue between.

== Story ==
Graduates from the Technical Training College are sent to a factory. The factory worker, Vladimir, tells them about the factory. Further along, they meet an old school friend, Borya. He tells them about their new invention, Babarobots, which are robot women.

== Track listing ==
1. "Бабаробот" - 30:16
2. "Караоке" - Karaoke – 1:54
3. "Наш завод" - Nash zavod - (Our Factory) – 1:49
4. "Мы идём" - My idyom - (We walk) – 1:44
5. "Бабаробот" - Babarobot - (Fembot) – 1:53
6. "Теперь я бабаробот" - Teper ya babarobot - (Now I'm a Fembot) – 1:34
7. "Мачи" - Machi - (Machos) – 3:03
8. "Всё хорошо" - Vsyo khorosho - (Everything is Good) – 2:38
9. "Кому легко" - Komu legko - (Whom Is It Easy For?) – 2:29
10. "Роботы ебоботы" - Roboty yeboboty - (Robots Fucking Robots) – 2:27
11. "Ария робота" - Ariya robota - (Aria of a Robot) – 1:50
12. "Геленджик" - Gelendzhik (a city in southern Russia) - 3:10
13. "Алые паруса" - Alye parusa - (Scarlet Sails) – 2:11
