= Aurora station =

Aurora station may refer to:

- Aurora station (Ohio), a former train station in Aurora, Ohio, U.S.A.
- Aurora GO Station, an intermodal transit station in Aurora, Ontario, Canada
- Aurora Metro Center station, a light rail station in Aurora, Colorado, U.S.A.
- Aurora Transportation Center, an intermodal transit station in Aurora, Illinois, U.S.A.
- La Aurora station, a Medellín Metro station in Colombia
- Aurora Space Station, a design concept for a commercial space station

== See also ==
- Aurora (disambiguation)
