= Aurora (university network) =

European university network

Aurora Universities
- Formation: 21 October 2016
- Type: Educational
- Headquarters: Vrije Universiteit Amsterdam
- Region served: Europe and USA
- Members: 10 (and 4 associate)
- President: Veronika Sexl, Universität Innsbruck
- Website: aurora-universities.eu

Aurora is a network of primarily European universities dedicated to the social impact of their activities and contributing to the Sustainable Development Goals. It was founded in 2016.

== Members ==
As of 2024, the 10 members are:

Country	Institution
Austria	University of Innsbruck
Czech Republic	Palacký University Olomouc
Denmark	Copenhagen Business School
France	Paris-East Créteil University
Germany	University of Duisburg-Essen
Iceland	University of Iceland
Italy	University of Naples Federico II
Netherlands	Vrije Universiteit Amsterdam
Spain	University of Rovira i Virgili
USA	University of Minnesota
