= William Juhasz =

Hungarian-American author

William P. Juhasz
- Juhász Vilmos
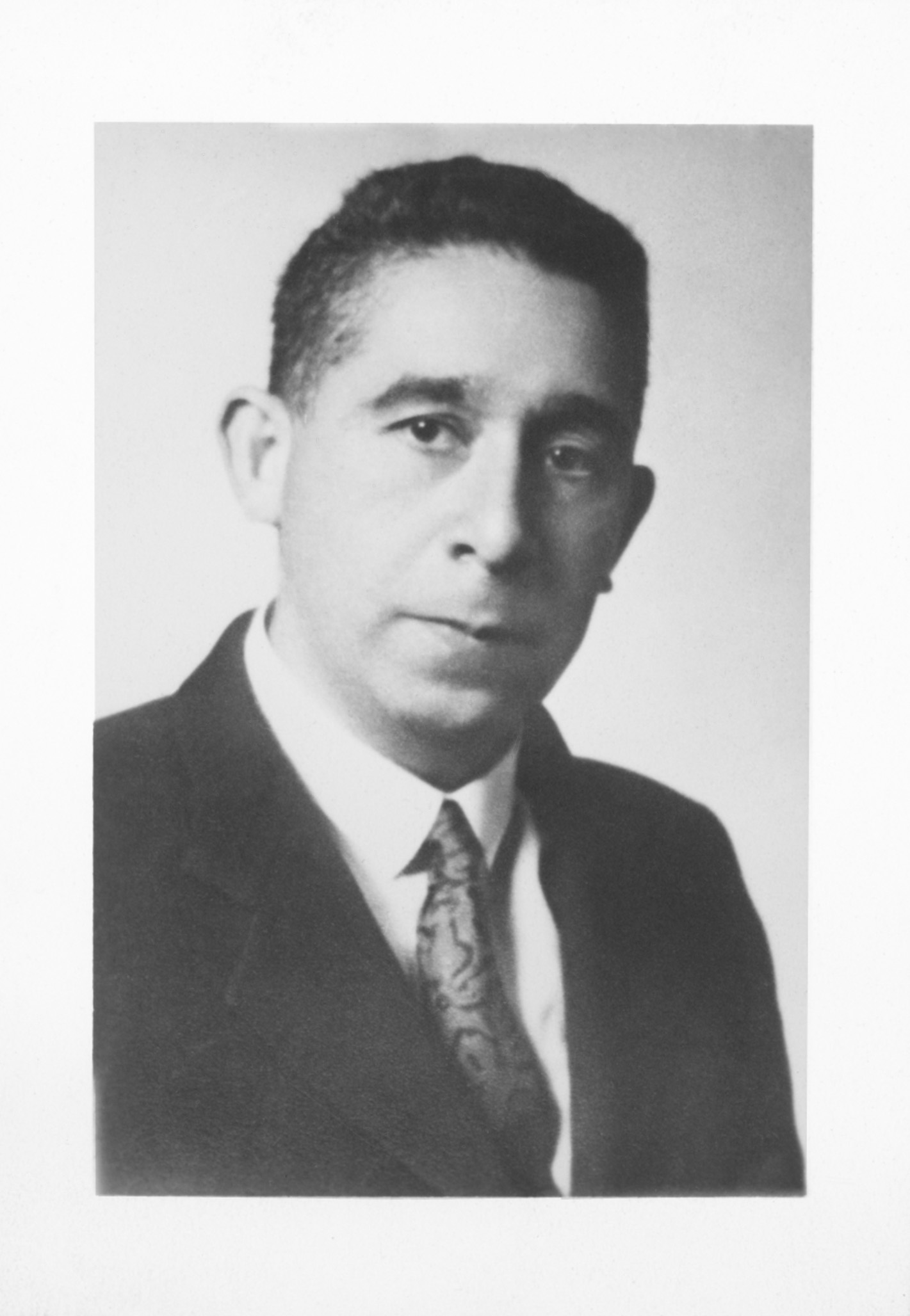
- Born: Haas Vilmos; August 30, 1899; Budapest
- Died: September 29, 1967 (aged 68); New York City
- Occupations: author, editor, cultural and religious historian, journalist, Roman Catholic lay intellectual, literary translator, university professor, lecturer, commentator

William Juhasz (August 30, 1899, Budapest – September 29, 1967, New York City) was a Hungarian-American author, editor, cultural and religious historian, journalist, Roman Catholic lay intellectual, literary translator, university professor, lecturer, commentator, Cold War operative. His research focused on the comparative religious history of pre-Christian times.

== Early life to World War II ==
William Juhasz came from a family of industrialists, financiers and land owners. Many members of this family were also involved in the world of arts and letters, among whom the most important and prominent was the composer Franz Schrecker. Juhasz's early interests and eventual career were a departure from his immediate family's involvement in finance and industry. Influenced by some of his secondary school teachers who were recognized leading intellectuals as well as some of his classmates and school mates who became leading intellectuals of the period between the two World Wars. He went on to become a leading intellectual of that period. Secondary education was at the Markó Street Gymnasium in Budapest. His home room teacher, Marcell Benedek, as well as his class and school mates were formative influences in his life and work. Among his youthful friends were some of the leaders of the Hungarian intelligentsia between the Wars; including: Bence Szabolcsi, György Sárközi, Márta Sárközi, Márta Vágó, Zoltán Horvát, and the monks László and Dénes Szedő. Like many in his milieu, William came from a Jewish family, and, again, like many in his milieu he became a convert to Roman Catholicism. Two of his closest friends, and associates, the Szedő brothers, also from Jewish families, became cloistered Carthusian monks in Italy. His conversion was a milestone in his personal and professional development. Mary Christianus, his future wife, was yet another major influence on his spiritual and professional development.

Having decided not to follow the family line of finance and industry, he embarked upon studies at the University with the aim of becoming a scholar. He dropped out after the second year and did not receive a degree, and embarked upon an intellectual career not based on higher educational attainments.

It was shortly after abandoning his university studies that he married Mary Christianus. Mary's background and educational career was quite different from his own although they were members of the same emerging intellectual elite between the wars. Her family background was more in the trades and manufacturing than in finance and industry. She never attended classical academic secondary school. Her family was not primarily Jewish and she had been raised Roman Catholic.

William and Mary met in their early 20s in the turmoil of post-World War I Budapest, as it found itself a capital of a minor European country after being a co-capital of one of the world's major powers. Mary Juhasz, was a lifelong collaborator both in the thought process as well as the actual writing of his published works. As is not uncommon, she did not receive formal recognition as a collaborator. Nonetheless there was nothing that he published that he did not or, more accurately, they did not discuss in depth and come to consensus on.

They would have three children together: Francis Juhasz, born Haas Ferenc (25 June 1925, died 1977), Lester Shepard, born Juhasz Laszlo (27 September 1929, died 2014), and Joseph Juhasz, born Juhaszi Jozsef Borisz (30 January 1938).

One of the members of his circle, Bence Szabolcsi's father-in-law Győző Andor, who was the proprietor of an eponymous respected publishing house, provided William with the opportunity to edit several encyclopedias as well as the writing of numerous entries in these. The entries in Encyclopedia of the Theater (Szinészeti lexikon) dealing with the ancient history of dance and drama in which he developed his ideas regarding symbolism in performance art, received very favorable notice not merely in Hungary but elsewhere in the world as well. With this, his career as a non-university educated intellectual was under way.

William Juhasz was passionate for many different branches of the humanities, the social sciences and the arts; he read widely and his career spanned an unusually wide swath of human learning and performance. For example, as a young man he participated in the archaeological work of Nándor Fettich, he wrote a science fiction novel, he wrote poetry (unpublished), he did editorial work for several publishers. In effect he became something of a Renaissance man, a polyhistor, someone who can synthesize and distill important information and lines of thought with originality and purpose. His work in comparative religious history encompasses original research, and in some ways he was extraordinarily proud of having been able to do that in addition to his other labors. During the 1937-1938 period as the anti-intellectual, anti-Semitic, and anti-democratic climate in Europe increasingly darkens the landscape, William and Mary give serious consideration to emigration to Canada, along with some of their close circle. In fact, they do not emigrate at this time and, by 1939, the window of opportunity for emigration had closed.

He worked as an editor and contributor to encyclopedias, and as a translator from German and English into Hungarian. He also wrote for periodicals, newspapers, and reviews, and published works on history, travel, and cultural history. By the age of 40, his work had gained a readership in Hungary. Notable works from this period include:

- Heroes, scientists, men: the last seventy years of history 1860-1930
- The world's peoples and cultures, United States of America
- The prince vol II. Rákóczi Ferencz

== 1939-1945 World War II ==
In 1939, at the age of 40, William had become an established figure in Hungarian literature. The outbreak of the Second World War interrupted his career and limited his opportunities to leave Hungary. As a person of Jewish background with anti-Nazi political views and progressive beliefs, he became increasingly vulnerable to prosecution as the Hungarian government introduced measures that excluded Jews and political dissenters from public life.

These developments were also catastrophic to the entire family—and of course, William being a family man—this fed back into his own personal and professional behavior. As a frosting on the cupcake, in 1939 he was called up for military service—ironically he was called for service in the First Hussar Regiment, an elite regiment of consummate cavalry men. This awkward intellectual, who had never sat on a horse in his entire life, was assigned the task of guarding Polish prisoners of war. In practice, the powers that be closed their eyes or looked the other way as Poles drifted out of Hungary, and as such his assignment became redundant. He was not called up again until 1944. He was forced by the ascendancy of National Socialism (Nazism), as well as the progress of the war, to lay aside his open struggles for peace, freedom, and democracy. As the lead political editor of the newspaper Az Újság, he nevertheless attempted to provide an objective view for its readers. The Hungary of 1939 through late 1944 was not the Germany of that period. It could be likened perhaps to Italy or Vichy France—awkwardly allied with the Germans. As such, the latitude for an intellectual was much wider than it would have been in Germany during this period. William understood and exploited this situation with masterful diplomacy.

He was one of the leading members of the Szent Kereszt Egyesület (Holy Cross Society) which was founded for the protection of Catholics who would be effected by the Jewish laws. His highly successful work Nyersanyagháború (War for natural resources) was written to make it crystal clear that the Axis powers were in no position to prevail in the war. Nagy Hóditók (Great conquerors) was written to demonstrate that history proves that dictators of the ilk of Hitler inevitably sow the seeds of their own destruction. As the managing editor of the Dante publishing house, he supported progressive writers and published progressive books. Megváltás Felé (Towards Redemption) deals with comparative religious history from the perspective of humankind's universal and timeless yearning for redemption. This was his most clearly original research scholarly work, its thrust is in line with what could be seen as a broadly-speaking Abrahamic view of human fate and the human condition, and its implicit condemnation of Nazism is transparent although unstated.

The German occupation of Hungary in 1944 put an end to these efforts. He was called up to be in a work camp. During these months, which included the Szálasi Arrow Cross regime, Mary Juhasz performed heroic service, at the risk of her own life, to protect and shelter the persecuted. She had such courage and presence of mind that she could face down armed uniformed adversaries—and did. William was able to flee from the work camp and spent the rest of the war in the attic of the Motherhouse of the Sisters of Social Service.

== From 1945-1948 in Hungary ==
In certain respects, it was a beaten family that emerged from the war—the horrors of the German occupation, not to mention the Arrow Cross regime, were a profound and deep crisis and catastrophe for the family. Among William's closest friends György Sárközi, Antal Szerb, József Kepes, and György Kecskeméti, had fallen victims to the holocaust and Bence Szabolcsi's only child had been murdered. Nonetheless, the victory of the allies provided an opportunity for hope and optimism. In the beginning, William believed he could be the participant in the forging of a new and democratic nation. He accepted a post as the political editor of the daily Szabad Szó (Free Speech) and with Sándor Sík he edited the restarted prestigious Catholic intellectual monthly review Vigilia. He was professor at the University of Szeged, which had belatedly bestowed a doctorate on him (in the absence of an undergraduate degree) taking Towards Redemption (Megváltás Felé) as his doctoral dissertation. He was co-editor of the equally prestigious literary weekly Új Idők (New Times). He provided radio commentary on foreign affairs and lectured frequently on a wide range of topics. He found himself at the vanguard of the post-Nazi progressive Catholic intelligentsia and was deeply involved in the formation of the Hungarian Christian Democratic Party (which modeled itself on its Western European counterparts) however, in the absence of direct support from the Allies, as the understanding of the Great Powers was that Hungary would be within the Soviet sphere of influence (although of course that had not been made plain to the Hungarians themselves).

He resumed his publishing activities (although with increasing pressure to find at least a neutral tone towards the emerging Sovietization of the Hungarian government) and in a short period of time edited the first Hungarian encyclopedia after the War Révai Kétkötetes Lexikona, and he wrote books on such diverse subjects as for example the meaning and importance of the Atomic Age (Az atomkorszak új világa) and edited the first post-war world atlas in Hungary—and with the aid of his eldest son Francis, the Hungarian Export Catalog.

However, with the start of the Rákosi Communist regime, (1945-1949) he became more and more a member of the opposition, or more accurately went into opposition. This of course, given the nature of the regime, made his work difficult and even risky. As a professor of the Catholic Free University he spoke out against the regime forcefully and frankly nevertheless.

During the fall of 1948 the regime began a campaign against Cardinal József Mindszenty, the Prince Primate of Hungary and Archbishop of Esztergom. Mindszenty was made the symbol of the futility of resistance to the regime. As part and parcel of this campaign, all public figures who were associated with him or with a religious viewpoint became suspect and objects of attention by the authorities. William Juhasz was kept under visible surveillance. On at least one occasion, when he picked up the telephone, the Secret Police answered.

== Emigration ==
Peaceful resistance and coexistence became futile as the Hungarian regime stepped up its efforts to eliminate opposition. His view was that he could carry out his work more effectively as a political exile. Steven Koczak, an American diplomat stationed in Budapest, provided assistance such that he was able to flee to Vienna. Hence he proceeded to Salzburg. His hotel room was like a press room: he was in touch with journalists beyond count, among whom we can mention Simon Bourgin, who represented Time, and George Weller, who represented the Chicago Daily News. He acted as a valuable source for Western journalists, Americans in particular, for current events in Hungary.

In 1950 he was put in charge of the Vatican Holy Year exhibition's section that dealt with the Church behind the Iron Curtain and moved his family to Italy. His work in this period included participation in the Marian Conference where he presented an original paper "Amictae sole" fundamenta etimologica et historica mission which argues that the power of the image of Mary as the "woman clothed in the Sun" was the motive force for the successful suppression of the bogomil heresy by Hungary. His stay in Italy saw him as co-editor of Katolikus Szemle (Catholic Review). At the end of the Holy Year he emigrated to the United States.

From that point on, his main work was with the National Committee for a Free Europe. He worked as an editor in their journalism and publishing sector. He was also a planning officer of the International Advisory Board to the National Committee for a Free Europe and he was the force behind the distribution of Western scientific and scholarly books to scholars behind the Iron Curtain under cover of their being review copies. It was during this period that he authored a series of monographs and book chapters which may be best understood as counter propaganda directed against the Soviet-dominated regime in Hungary. These works reveal a hope and, even conviction, that the Bolshevik experiment in Hungary was doomed and would be replaced by a return to the proper order of things within the framework of Catholic liberal humanism of Western Civilization that Hungary had embraced for almost one thousand years. A brief summary of some of these works follows.

The Development of Catholicism in Hungary in Modern Times In this sweeping, 60 page survey of the history of Catholicism in Hungary the author covers almost 1000 years in a masterful yet unavoidably dizzying way. Written as a Hungarian émigré, this monograph is clearly aimed at exposing the brutal, unjust and inhumane attack on the Catholic Church by the Soviet-led forces in Hungary. This is done less by dwelling on the specific instances of oppression, such as Cardinal Mindszenty, which were already well-documented elsewhere. Rather, this piece seeks to inform the reader that the Church in Hungary holds a unique place as a moral force for social reform which clearly cannot be matched by a morally bankrupt Bolshevism. The argument is made by providing historical context and citing specific examples rather than ideological debate. In terms of the examples cited, the author enumerates a litany of heroic Hungarian men and women of the Church. One man is particularly singled out for attention as a sort of exemplar, Ottokar Prohaszka, who is quoted extensively and of whom the author states: "the first true genius since the Counter Reformation, of Hungarian Catholic literature and theology, and the advocate of a radical solution, in a Christ-like spirit, of the social problems. Spiritualist, creative writer, and social reformer; these basic elements of his personality were united in perfect harmony." The historical context is perhaps best summed up in these words of the author: "… the curious recurring paradox of the history of Catholicism by which persecution and oppression proved beneficial to the deepening and purification of religious life."

Blueprint for a Red Generation Written in 1952, at the height of the Cold War, this critique draws back the iron curtain from the author's native post-war Hungary for an in-depth critique of the educational methods and goals of the Soviet socialist system as applied in Hungary. As a clear antithesis to the deceptive propaganda behind the Iron Curtain, the author presents a well-researched, fact based analysis which recognizes that the Soviet engineered education reforms were very successful at achieving their goals. These achievements are cited with specific data and include historically high enrollment and graduation rates and almost complete elimination of illiteracy. The author reminds us that the stated goal of this is to serve the State in building its new Industrial utopia with ever increasing production efficiency. As argued by Juhasz, these goals come at the expense of human freedom, breakdown of the family, suppression of national identity, and elimination of religious practice. Not only are the goals anathema to the author's view of humanity and culture, but the methods to achieve them are a testament to their malevolence including the omnipresence of political commissars (thought police), and the brutal attacks on those who showed less than total enthusiasm for the new order. "The narrow specialization, the complete ideological control, the autocratic domination, the Russification, the cultural, technological, and historical distortions to match Russian patterns … The constant anti-democratic propaganda and above all the iron curtain against free expression and exclusion of all true Western knowledge and history…" The devil is in the details and the author cites numerous examples of the tyranny that the Hungarian people were subjected to in their education system at this time.

Mother of the Church of Silence Explores the deep and pervasive devotion to Mary, Mother of God, by Hungarians throughout its history and how this devotion has sustained the faith of the people in spite of the suppression of the Church and religious practice in the Cold War.

Bartok's Years in America Based on a series of anonymous interviews with close friends and acquaintances of Bartok during his time in America. The theme is the high emotional cost of leaving one's native land to uphold moral convictions.

== Post 1956 ==
In the period following the 1956 Uprising in Hungary, there is a paucity of published writings by Dr. Juhasz, and certainly nothing that would suggest a hope for a counter-revolution in Hungary or, even critiques of the post-1949 Hungarian regime. However, Dr. Juhasz played a key role in a covert, CIA-funded book distribution program that was revealed in extensive detail in a 2013 book Hot Books in the Cold War. The author, Alfred Reisch, was Juhasz's assistant from 1956 until 1967 and his successor in the book distribution program until its demise at the end of the Cold War in 1991. According to Reisch, the book program had as its primary objective to maintain ties to the intellectual and political elite in Eastern Europe who were otherwise deprived of Western publications due to severe censorship. The publications covered a broad range of recognized literary works as well as specialized scholarly and scientific articles.

In 1959 he began lecturing on Hungarian Cultural History at Columbia University (New York) and from 1964 on he was a teacher of the Széchényi Literary Circle in New York.

In 1967 he suffered a brain embolism. At first he appeared to recover. However, shortly thereafter there was one medical incident after another. He died September 29, 1967, in New York.

== Bibliography ==
- Juhász Vilmos; Sík Sándor ed. (1947). A szeretet breviáriuma, Új Idők Irodalmi Intézet RT. (Singer és Wolfner)
