= S.P. Aurora =

- Full name: Società Polisportiva Aurora
- Founded: 1968
- Dissolved: 31 August 1987; 38 years ago
- League: Serie A2
- 1986–87: ?
| Home colours | Away colours |

Società Polisportiva Aurora, also known simply as S.P. Aurora, was a sammarinese association football club based in Santa Mustiola, in the castle of the City of San Marino.

== History ==
=== Foundation ===
The club was founded in 1968.

=== 1985–86 Campionato Sammarinese di Calcio ===
S.P. Aurora participates on the first ever season of the Campionato Sammarinese di Calcio.

| Pos | Team | Pld | W | D | L | GF | GA | Pts | Qualification or relegation |
|---|---|---|---|---|---|---|---|---|---|
| 14 | Aurora | 16 | 2 | 6 | 8 | 20 | 44 | 10 | Relegation to Serie A2 |

=== Dissolution ===
At the end of the 1986–87 season of the Serie A2, the club entered in recess on 3 April 1987 and later was dissolved on 31 August of the same year.

== Records and data ==
- Seasons in Campionato Sammarinese di Calcio: 1 (1985–86).
- Seasons in Serie A2: 1 (1986–87).
