= Hleb (album) =

Khleb

Studio album by Leningrad
- Released: 2005
- Genre: Ska punk
- Label: Misteriya zvuka

Leningrad chronology
(Ne) Polnoye sobraniye sochineniy (2004)	Khleb (2005)	Huinya (2005)

Hleb (Russian: Хлеб, meaning 'bread') is an album released by the Russian band Leningrad. This album was later re-released in Germany, where it gained some popularity.

Hleb is the band's first album distributed in the United Kingdom.

"Malaya Leningradskaya Simfoniya" is a classical compilation of five Leningrad songs performed by the Rastrelli Cello Quartet, arranged by Sergey Drabkina. The songs are: "WWW", "Komon Evribadi", "Mne bi v nebo", "Cell Phone" and "Tango (Ya tak lyublyu tebya)".

== Track listing ==
1. "Ленин-Град" - Lenin-Grad – 2:43
2. "Небесный теннис" - Nebesniy tennis - (Heavenly tennis) – 3:28
3. "На Не" - Na Ne – 2:19
4. "Суть" - Sut (Essence) – 2:27
5. "Ф.К." - F.K. – 2:09
6. "Нефть" - Neft - (Crude-oil) – 1:42
7. "Кто того" - Kto togo - (Who to Whom) – 2:42
8. "Kaka-in" – (Cocaine) - 2:08
9. "Свобода" - Svoboda - (Freedom) – 3:09
10. "Флаг" - Flag – 1:48
11. "Кредит" - Kredit - (Credit) – 3:18
12. "На хуй рок-н-ролл" - Na Huy Rok-n-Roll - (Fuck Rock n' Roll) – 2:40
13. "Мчащийся сквозь грозу" - Mchaschiysya skvoz grozu - (Rushing Through a Storm) – 2:35
14. "Багдад" – Bagdad - Baghdad - 2:54
15. "Гитара" - Gitara - (Guitar) – 1:40
16. "Песня старого фаната" - Pesnya starogo fanata - (Song of an old fan) – 1:36
17. "Малая ленинградская симфония" - Malaya leningradskaya simfoniya - (Small Leningrad Symphony) – 6:26
