= Aurora, Dichteren =

Dutch windmill

Aurora
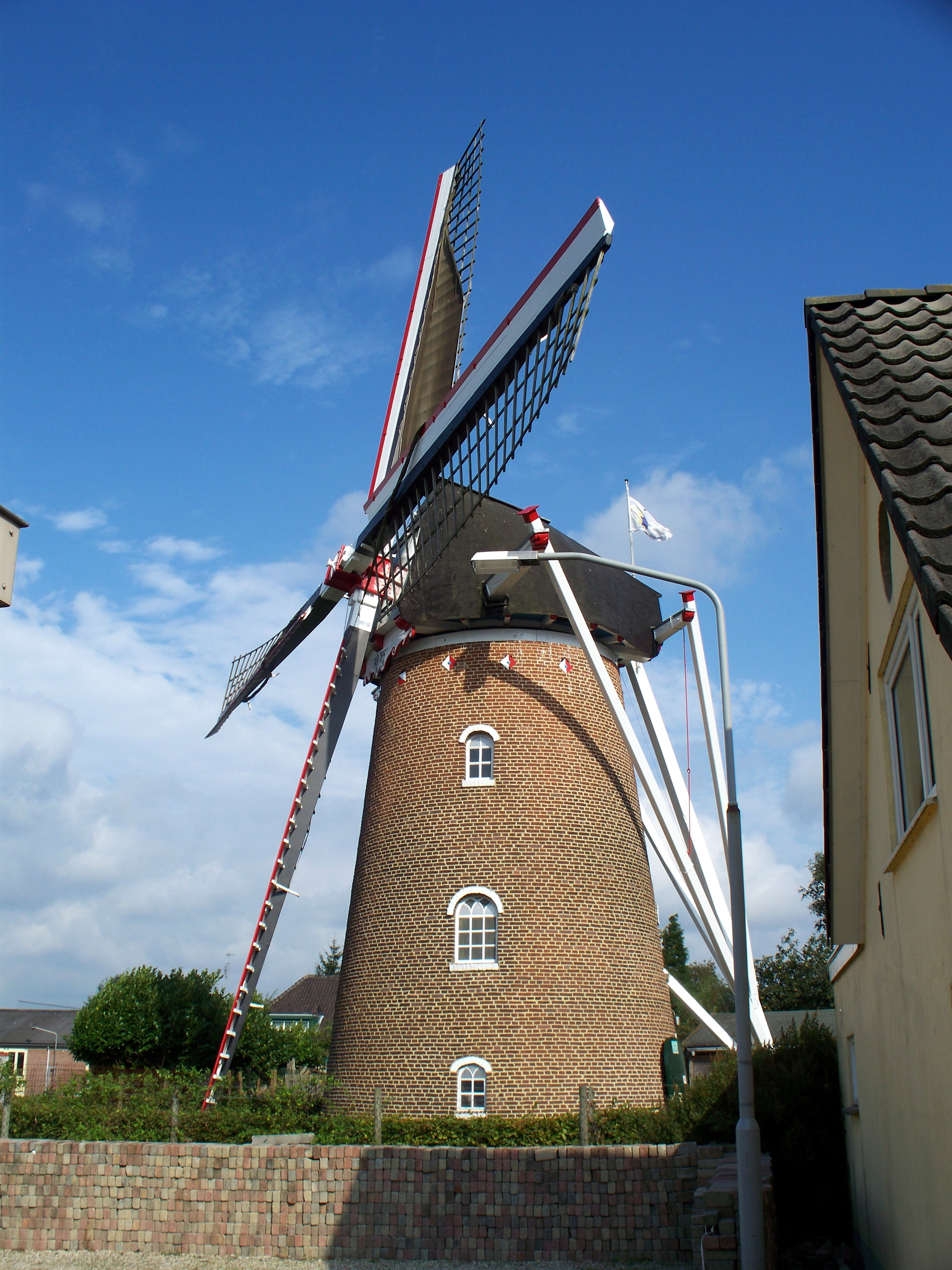
- The mill in September 2008
- Interactive map of Aurora

Origin
- Mill name: Aurora
- Mill location: Wehlseweg 1, 7007 GD, Doetinchem
- Coordinates: 51°57′18″N 6°16′17″E
- Operator: Municipality of Doetinchem
- Year built: 1870

Information
- Purpose: Corn mill
- Type: Tower mill
- Storeys: Three storeys
- No. of sails: Four sails
- Type of sails: Common sails
- Windshaft: cast iron
- Winding: Tailpole and winch
- No. of pairs of millstones: One pair
- Size of millstones: 1.30 metres (4 ft 3 in) diameter

Aurora is a tower mill in Dichteren, Gelderland, Netherlands. It was built in 1870 and has been restored to working order. The mill is listed as a Rijksmonument.

== History ==
There has been a windmill in Dichteren since 1459. A mill was also recorded as standing in 1501. On 12 August 1612 a post mill here was severely damaged by lightning. The mill here was blown down on 4 November 1800, with two casualties. It stood on the Houtkamp.

A replacement post mill was built in 1801. It was demolished in 1870. Parts of the post mill were incorporated in Aurora, the tower mill built to replace it. This mill was built on a new site as the old site was not well placed for wind. Aurora was built for A Harbers, it was to remain in the ownership of the Harbers family until 1976.

In 1953, the mill was fitted with two Ten Have sails. A photograph shows that all four sails were fitted with streamlined leading edges on the Van Bussel system. In 1976, the mill was sold to the Gemeente Doetinchem. The Ten Have sails were removed when the mill was restored in 1978, and unstreamlined Common sails were fitted in their place. The windshaft from Sara Catharina, Kerkdriel, Gelderland was fitted at this date, with the windshaft from Aurora going to that mill. The restored mill was reopened on 16 September 1978. Aurora is listed as a Rijksmonument, № 13089.

== Description ==
Aurora is what the Dutch call a "Grondzeiler". It is a three storey tower mill. There is no stage, the sails reaching almost down to ground level. The cap is covered in dakleer. Winding is by tailpole and winch. The sails are Common sails. They have a span of 20.66 metres (67 ft 9 in). They are carried on a cast iron windshaft, which was cast by NSBM, Feyenoord, South Holland in 1848. The windshaft also carries the brake wheel, which has 61 cogs. This drives a wallower with 32 cogs, which is situated at the top of the upright shaft. At the bottom of the upright shaft is the great spur wheel, which has 94 cogs. This drives a pair of 1.30 metres (4 ft 3 in) diameter Cullen millstones via a lantern pinion stone nut with 28 staves.

== Public access ==
Aurora is open on Monday and Thursday from 09:00 to 12:00, or by appointment.
