= Avrora (album) =

Studio album by Leningrad
- Released: 2007
- Genre: Ska, ska punk
- Length: 53:37
- Label: Gala Records
- Producer: S.B.A. Production

Leningrad chronology
Babye leto (2006)	Avrora (2007)

Avrora (Russian: Аврора, meaning 'Aurora'), is an album by the Russian band Leningrad. It was released in 2007.

== Track listing ==
No.	Title	Length
1.	"Vokrug Sveta" (Around the World)	0:55
2.	"Hello, Moscow!"	2:23
3.	"Muzika Dlya Muzhika" (Music for a Guy)	3:08
4.	"Paganini"	2:08
5.	"Buhlo" (Booze)	2:48
6.	"I Tak Dalee" (And So On)	2:52
7.	"Pro Kovboev" (About Cowboys)	3:01
8.	"Babtsi" (Broads)	2:50
9.	"Polniy Pizdets" (Completely Fucked Up)	3:05
10.	"Remont" (Repairs)	2:33
11.	"Pro Shnura" (About Shnur)	2:44
12.	"Nochi Naprolyot" (Night After Night)	2:37
13.	"Yablochko" (Little Apple)	2:23
14.	"Peremen" (Change)	1:59
15.	"Kislotniy DJ" (Acid DJ)	2:18
16.	"Ey, Uhnem!" (Hey-ho!)	2:46
17.	"Paganini-Remiks" (Paganini Remix)	2:55
18.	"Babtsi-Remiks" (Broads Remix)	4:49
19.	"Roboti-Eboboti" (Bonus Track)	3:32
20.	"Dacha" (Bonus Track)	2:29
Total length:		56:37
