= Aurora Energy =

Aurora Energy may refer to:

- Aurora Energy (Alaska), an energy company in Fairbanks, Alaska
- Aurora Energy (New Zealand), an energy company in Otago, New Zealand
- Aurora Energy (Tasmania), an energy company in Tasmania, Australia
