= Veronika Sexl =

Austrian pharmacologist and toxicologist

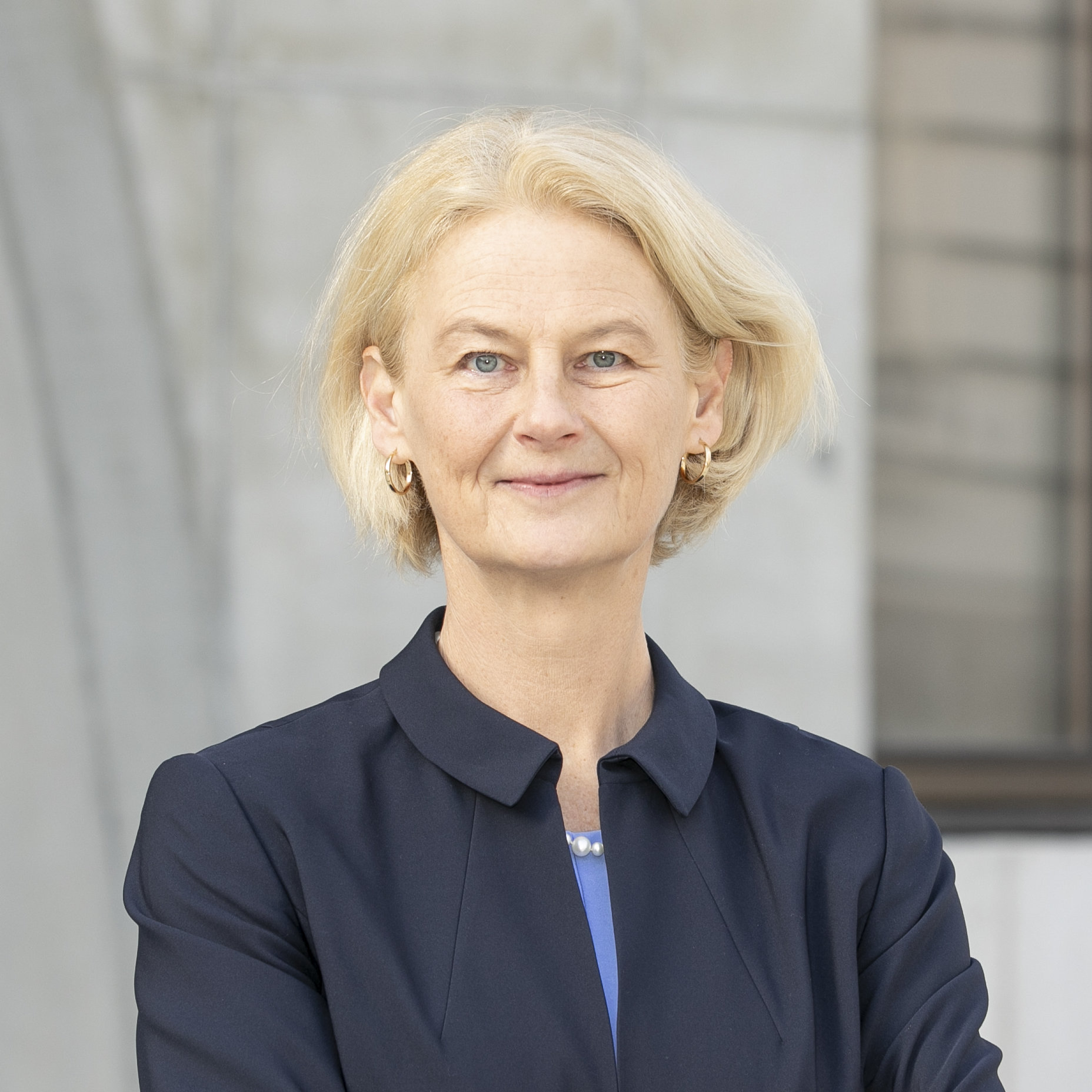
Veronika Sexl, 2003

Veronika Sexl (born February 27, 1966) is an Austrian pharmacologist and toxicologist with a research focus on cancer. Since March 1, 2023, she has served as rector of the University of Innsbruck. She has received several awards, including the City of Vienna Prize in the medicine category, the Novartis Prize for Medicine and the Alois Sonnleitner Prize, and the Cardinal Innitzer Award for Natural Sciences.

== Life ==
Sexl studied medicine in Vienna, then worked in Seattle and Memphis. She returned to Vienna in 2007 when she was appointed professor at the Medical University of Vienna. She also served as Chair of the Senate of the Veterinary University of Vienna, and as Austria’s representative on the European Molecular Biology Organization (EMBL/EMBO).

Her main research areas include comparative and translational medicine, using transgenic animals and human patient samples as disease models; NK cell–mediated tumor surveillance with a focus on leukemia; and signaling pathways involved in hematopoiesis and leukemogenesis, with an emphasis on JAK-STAT signaling and the novel role of CDK6 as a transcriptional regulator.

In 2017, Sexl was awarded the City of Vienna Prize in the medicine category for “her outstanding performance during her career”. She is a member of the Austrian Academy of Sciences. She has also been awarded the Novartis Prize for Medicine and the Alois Sonnleitner Prize. In 2023, she was honoured with the Cardinal Innitzer Award for Natural Sciences “for her outstanding achievements in the field of cancer research”.

In 2023, she was appointed rector of the University of Innsbruck.

== Awards ==
- 2005: Novartis Prize for Medicine
- 2006: Alois Sonnleitner Prize of the Austrian Academy of Sciences (ÖAW)
- 2008" “Major Central European Prize of the City of Vienna Fund for innovative interdisciplinary cancer research” - Major Award for Cancer Research of the Vienna Fund
- 2015: Elected member of the Austrian Academy of Sciences (OAW)
- 2017: Award for Medical Sciences of the City of Vienna

== Selected publications ==
- Christoph S N Klose; Melanie Flach; Luisa Möhle; et al. (2014). "Differentiation of type 1 ILCs from a common progenitor to all helper-like innate lymphoid cell lineages". Cell. 157 (2): 340–356. doi:10.1016/j.cell.2014.03.030. PMID 24725403. Wikidata Q45859851.
- Moriggl, R; Topham, D J; Teglund, S; et al. (1999). "Stat5 is required for IL-2-induced cell cycle progression of peripheral T cells". Immunity. 10 (2): 249–59. doi:10.1016/s1074-7613(00)80025-4. PMID 10072077. Wikidata Q22009002.
- M Cheng; Sexl, Veronika; C J Sherr; Roussel, Martine (1998). "Assembly of cyclin D-dependent kinase and titration of p27Kip1 regulated by mitogen-activated protein kinase kinase (MEK1)". Proceedings of the National Academy of Sciences of the United States of America. 95 (3): 1091–1096. Bibcode:1998PNAS...95.1091C. doi:10.1073/pnas.95.3.1091. PMC 18683. PMID 9448290. Wikidata Q24685138.
- Karoline Kollmann; Gerwin Heller; Christine Schneckenleithner; et al. (2013). "A kinase-independent function of CDK6 links the cell cycle to tumor angiogenesis". Cancer Cell. 24 (2): 167–81. doi:10.1016/j.ccr.2013.07.012. PMC 3743049. PMID 23948297. Wikidata Q28296641.
- Sexl, Veronika; Roland Piekorz; Richard Moriggl; et al. (2000). "Stat5a/b contribute to interleukin 7–induced B-cell precursor expansion, but abl- andbcr/abl-induced transformation are independent of Stat5". Blood. 96 (6): 2277–2283. doi:10.1182/blood.v96.6.2277. Wikidata Q127072428.
