= Aurora, Ceará =

Municipality in Ceará, Brazil

Coordinates: 6°56′34″S 38°58′04″W

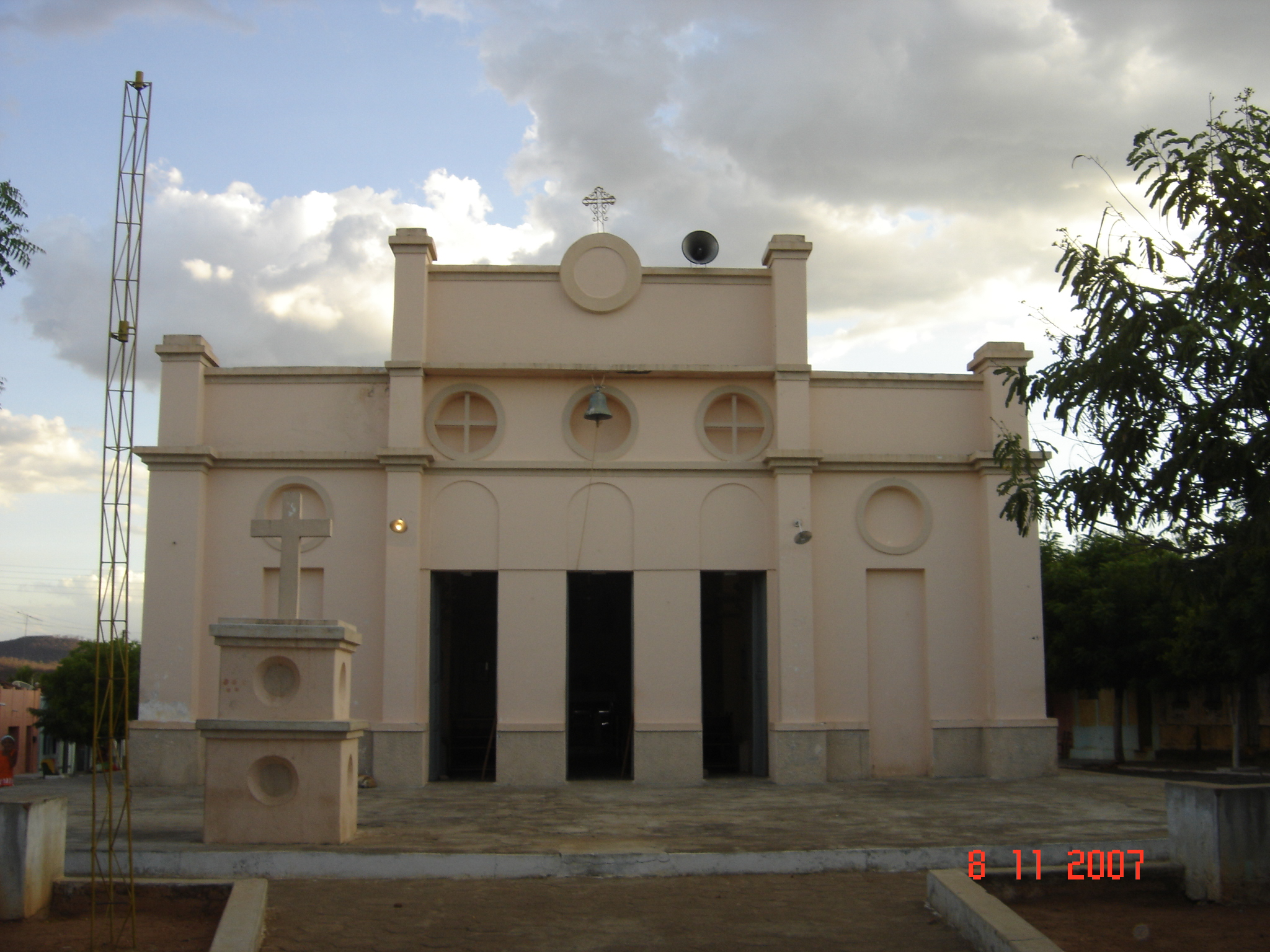
Aurora, Ceará AURORA 2007 283
- Municipality
- Flag

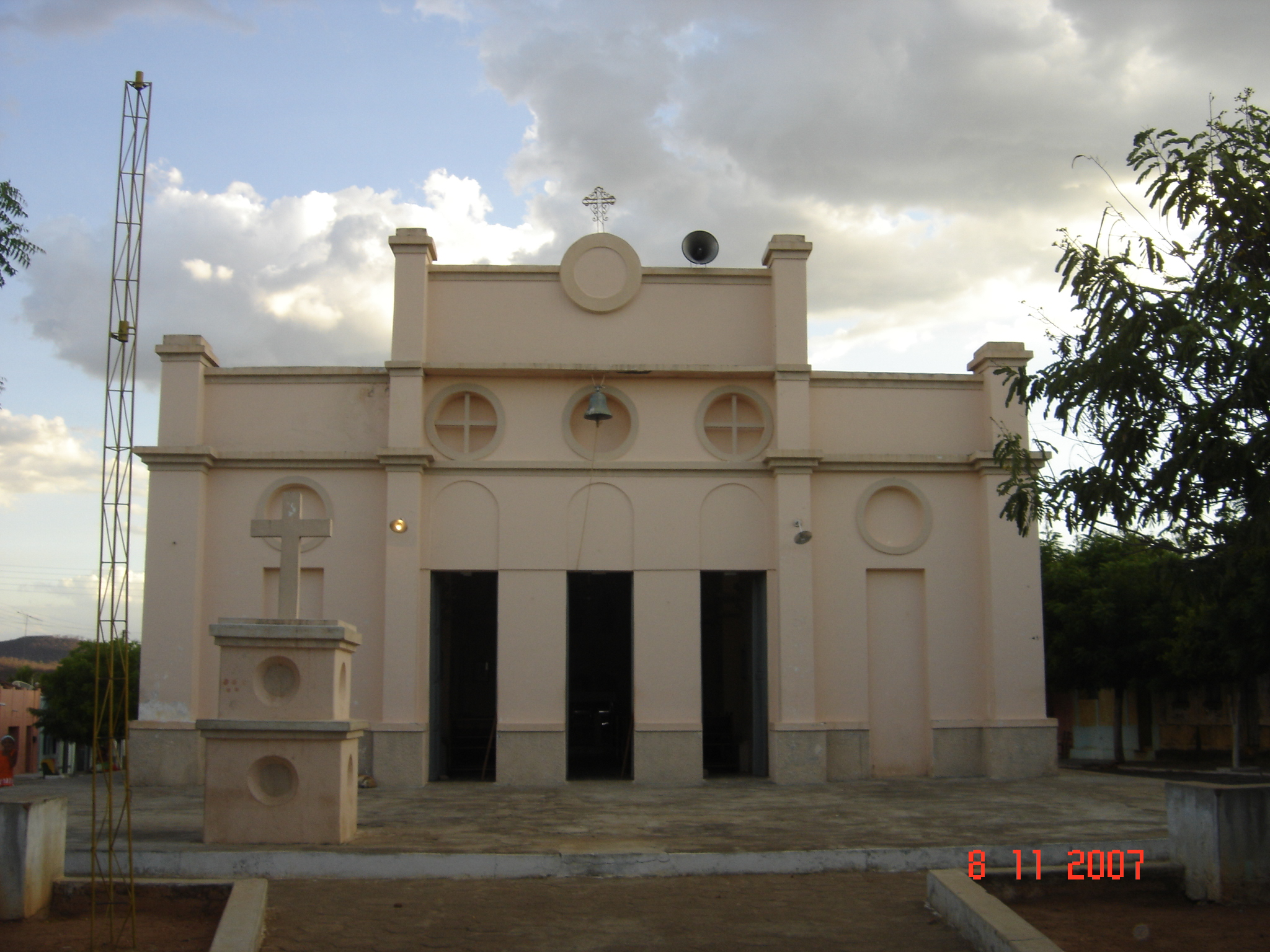
- Interactive map of Aurora, Ceará AURORA 2007 283
- Country: Brazil
- Region: Nordeste
- State: Ceará
- Mesoregion: Sul Cearense

Population (2020)
  - Total: 24,610
- Time zone: UTC−3 (BRT)

Aurora, Ceará is a municipality in the state of Ceará in the Northeast region of Brazil.

== See also ==
- List of municipalities in Ceará
