= József Molnár (writer) =

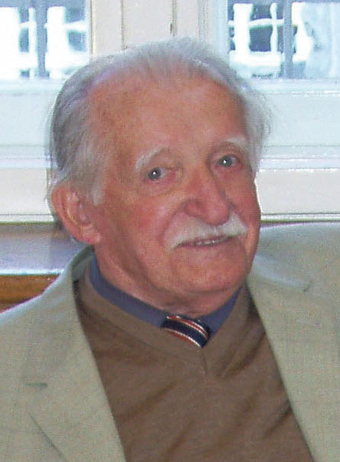
József Molnár (2009)

József Molnár (27 August 1918, Budapest, Hungary — 1 December 2009, Munich, Germany) was a Hungarian writer, journalist, publisher and printer.

== Biography ==
His mother, Mária Lagler (1886–1943), worked in Budapest as a cook, his biological father is unknown. József grew up in Csepreg with relatives of his mother. He bore his mother's maiden name and was called József Lagler until the age of fourteen, when he was adopted by Jenő Molnár. He attended the Kossuth Lajos Grammar School in Budapest.

On 1 December 1938, he became a member of the Social Democratic Party of Hungary. In 1945, he joined the National Peasant Party (Nemzeti Parasztpárt) and was elected to their executive committee. In 1947, he resigned from the party and left Hungary in November 1948. From then on he lived in exile. After arriving in Switzerland, in the summer of 1949 he earned his living in various companies as a labourer. In the further course of his emigration, József Molnár worked for several years as a political commentator at Radio Free Europe. He went on to New York and back again to Europe.

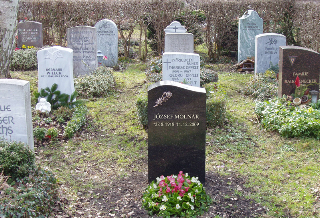
Urn grave 166-A-U1-142

== Family ==
In 1955, he met Olga Leibold, his future second wife. It was a conversation about the novel The Bridge of San Luis Rey by Thornton Wilder. The couple wed in September 1965 and remained together until József's death. His cremated remains are located at the Munich East Cemetery.

== Work ==
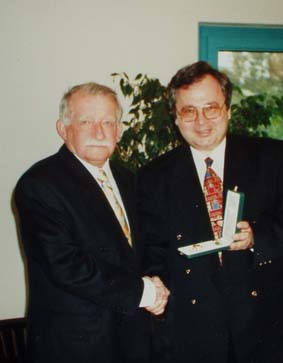
1997 – Consul general László Püspök (r.) presented the award to József Molnár (l.)

In 1950, József Molnár joined a group of Hungarian exiles, who founded a journal of literature and politics, Látóhatár, and renamed again in 1958 as Új Látóhatár (New Horizon). He founded a printing company in Munich, where the magazine was produced over decades of outstanding quality. He was the spiritus rector of the magazine until the publication of the last issue in December 1989. From 1963, he published numerous books of Hungarian authors in his publishing house Aurora. In 1997, Molnár was honored for his life's work with the Officer's Cross of the Order of Merit of the Republic of Hungary.

He viewed himself as "a servant of letters". He spent years doing research on the Hungarian punchcutter Miklós Kis (1650–1702), and created Misztótfalusi Kis Miklós Múzeumi Alapítvány. He founded the museum in Misztótfalu, which was inaugurated and opened to the public on 8 September 1991. He was a founding member of the Academia Musicae Pro Mundo Uno in Rome. The Academia was founded in 1978 by József Juhar (a Hungarian theologian and music expert). Juhar and Molnár remained lifelong friends.

== Awards ==
- 1991 Pro Cultura Hungarica Plaquette
- 1991 Bethlen Gábor Prize
- 1994 Nagy Imre Memorial Award
- 1997 Officer's Cross of the Order of Merit of the Hungarian Republic

== Bibliography ==
- 1996 Tanulmányok a magyar forradalomról (ISBN 90-8501-069-1)
- 2000 Misztótfalusi Kis Miklós (ISBN 963-506-329-6)
- 2002 Áchim L. András élete és halála (ISBN 963-9337-39-0)
- 2002 A betű szolgálatában. Negyven év az Új Látóhatárért és a nyugati magyar irodalomért. Válogatott írások (ISBN 963-446-230-8)
- 2006 Radio Free Europe in the days of the revolution (ISBN 963-9592-10-2)
- 2009 Életem (Autobiography by József Molnár) (ISBN 978-3-00-031787-3)
