= Aurora, Florence County, Wisconsin =

Aurora, Wisconsin
- Town
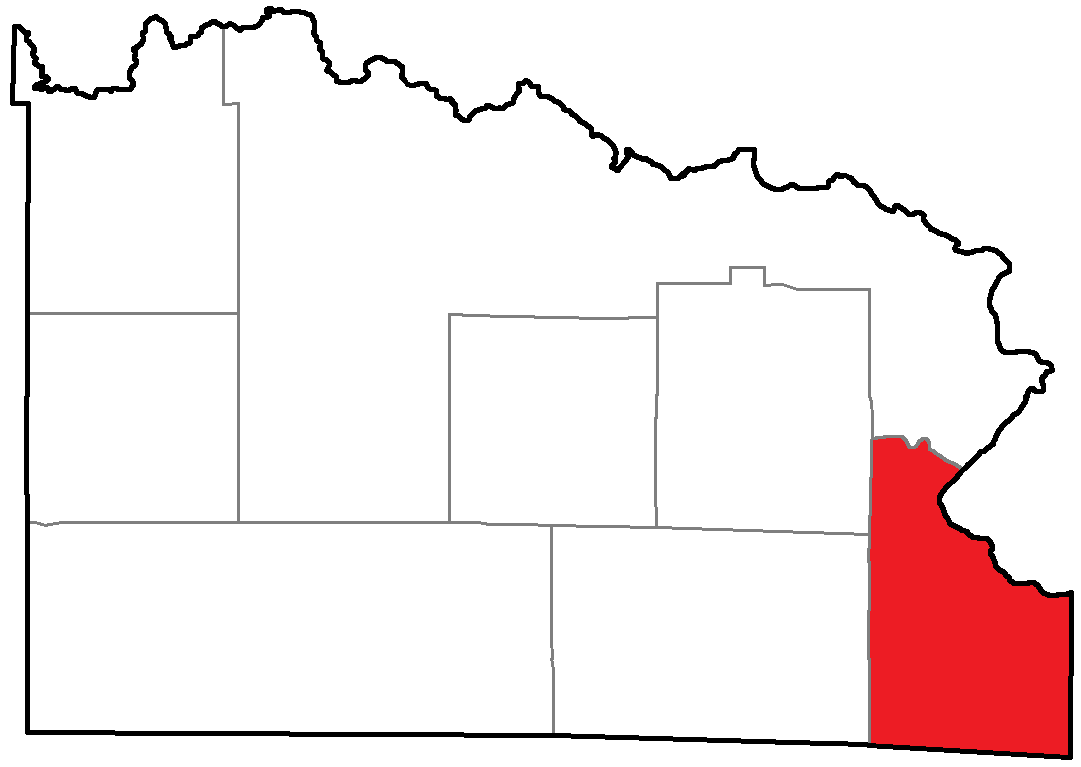
- Location of Aurora, within Florence County

- Location of Aurora in Wisconsin Aurora, Wisconsin (the United States)
- Coordinates: 45°45′28″N 88°6′16″W
- Country: United States
- State: Wisconsin
- County: Florence

Area
  - Total: 38.4 sq mi (99.4 km^{2})
  - Land: 38.0 sq mi (98.3 km^{2})
  - Water: 0.42 sq mi (1.1 km^{2})
- Elevation: 1,302 ft (397 m)

Population (2020)
  - Total: 987
  - Density: 26.0/sq mi (10.0/km^{2})
- Time zone: UTC-6 (Central (CST))
  - Summer (DST): UTC-5 (CDT)
- Zip Code: 54151
- Area codes: 715 & 534
- FIPS code: 55-03875
- GNIS feature ID: 1582734

Aurora is a town in Florence County, Wisconsin, United States. The population was 987 at the 2020 census. Aurora lies on the Michigan-Wisconsin border, across the Menominee River from Kingsford, Michigan.

== Aurora ==
Aurora is a community within the town located along County Trunk Highway N, immediately south of Kingsford. The community contains a mixture of homes and businesses along the county highway and a bridge crossing the Menominee River that connects to M-95 in the Michigan city.

== Geography ==
According to the United States Census Bureau, the town has a total area of 38.4 square miles (99.4 km^{2}), of which 38.0 square miles (98.3 km^{2}) is land and 0.4 square mile (1.1 km^{2}) (1.07%) is water.

== Demographics ==
Historical population
Census	Pop.	Note	%±
1920	558		—
1930	916		64.2%
1940	981		7.1%
1950	951		−3.1%
1960	914		−3.9%
1970	920		0.7%
1980	1,050		14.1%
1990	1,036		−1.3%
2000	1,186		14.5%
2010	1,036		−12.6%
2020	987		−4.7%
U.S. Decennial Census

As of the census of 2000, there were 1,186 people, 485 households, and 340 families residing in the town. The population density was 31.2 inhabitants per square mile (12.0/km^{2}). There were 535 housing units at an average density of 14.1 per square mile (5.4/km^{2}). The racial makeup of the town was 98.90% White, 0.25% African American, 0.25% Native American, 0.08% Asian, 0.08% from other races, and 0.42% from two or more races. Hispanic or Latino of any race were 0.93% of the population.

There were 485 households, out of which 30.5% had children under the age of 18 living with them, 59.2% were married couples living together, 7.2% had a female householder with no husband present, and 29.7% were non-families. 24.7% of all households were made up of individuals, and 10.3% had someone living alone who was 65 years of age or older. The average household size was 2.45 and the average family size was 2.90.

In the town, the population was spread out, with 25.2% under the age of 18, 5.7% from 18 to 24, 29.9% from 25 to 44, 25.4% from 45 to 64, and 13.7% who were 65 years of age or older. The median age was 39 years. For every 100 females, there were 103.4 males. For every 100 females age 18 and over, there were 103.0 males.

The median income for a household in the town was $34,107, and the median income for a family was $41,736. Males had a median income of $30,515 versus $21,500 for females. The per capita income for the town was $19,226. About 5.1% of families and 7.2% of the population were below the poverty line, including 7.5% of those under age 18 and 9.4% of those age 65 or over.
