= Aurora, Kenosha County, Wisconsin =

Former community in Wisconsin, U.S.

Coordinates: 42°34′56″N 87°53′06″W

Aurora is now part of the city of Kenosha, in Kenosha County, Wisconsin, United States but was the site of one of the area's earliest post offices, opened in the early 1830s at the Willis Tavern, the Aurora community center on the west side of the old Green Bay Trail (now Highway 31) just north of what is now 60th Street (Kenosha County Highway K). A Chicago-Milwaukee stagecoach line began operating in 1836 (twelve years before Wisconsin statehood) and served Aurora. The post office was finally closed in 1843. No traces of the community exist today.
