= Aurora de Chile =

Chilean periodical (1812–13)

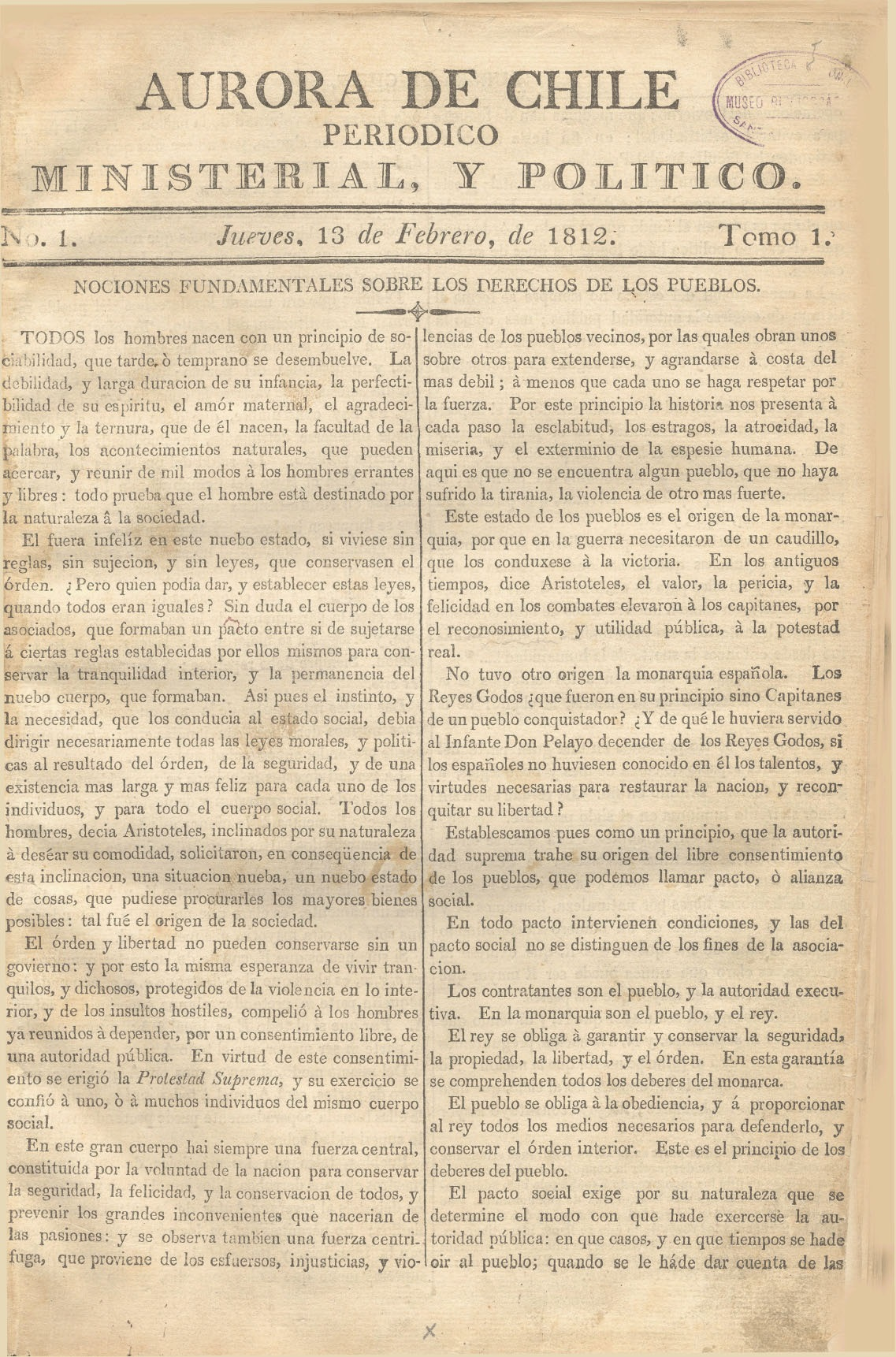
First issue of the Aurora de Chile

The Aurora de Chile (English: Dawn of Chile) was the first periodical in Chilean history and mostly dealt with politics and political philosophy. It was in print from Thursday, February 13, 1812, to Thursday, April 1, 1813, at which point it became El Monitor Araucano. The paper had four printed pages with two columns each and was published weekly, every Thursday.

== Background ==
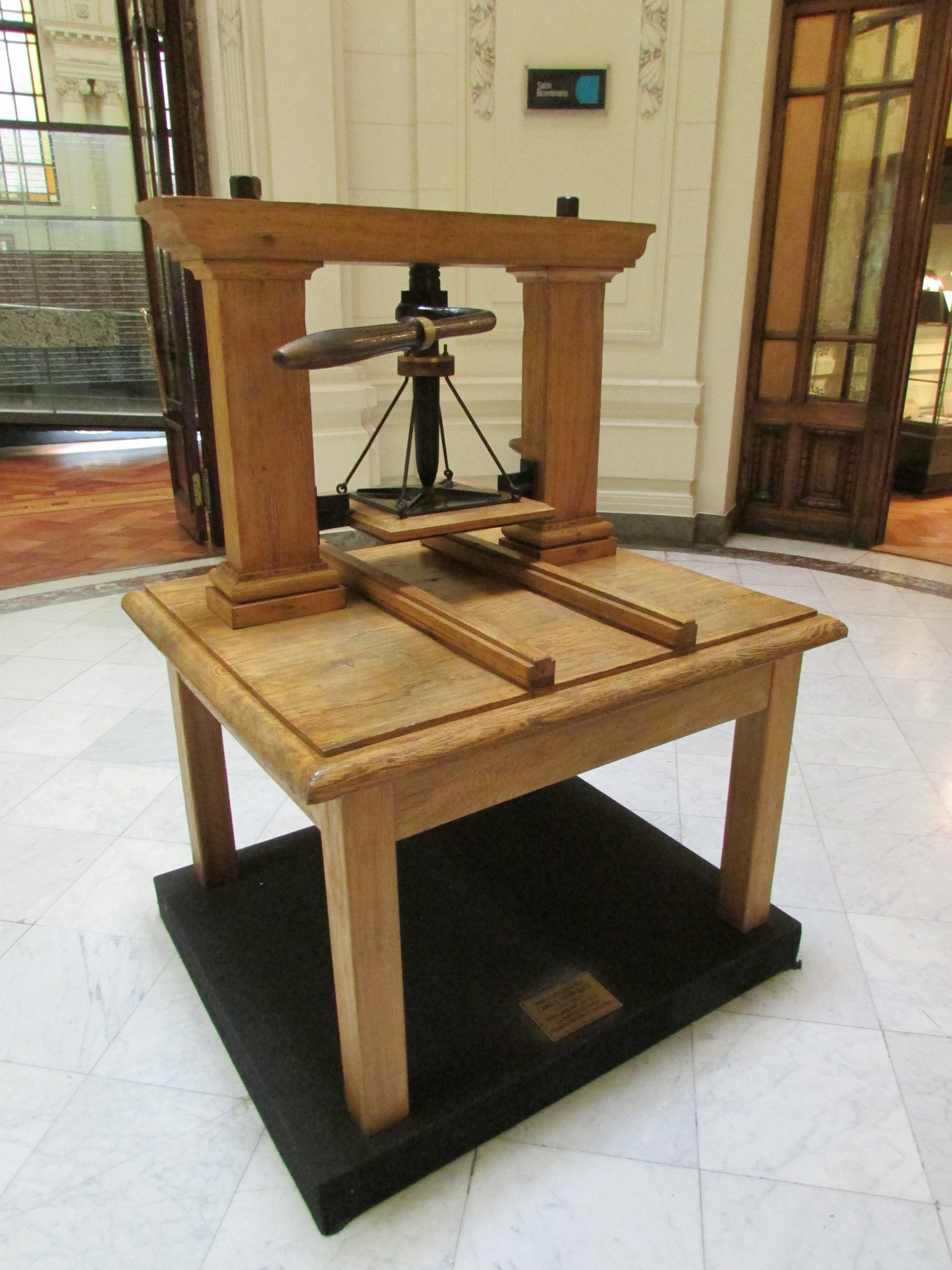
The printing press used to publish the Aurora de Chile.

Until the time of the Aurora de Chile's publication, the only printed newspapers came from Lima, Buenos Aires, and Spain, and they only arrived in Chile after a considerable delay. The Age of Enlightenment's political philosophy and the political documents and pamphlets of the revolutions in the United States and France were known in Chile and had been translated. However, while there may have been a printing press operated by the Spanish Jesuits for printing religious material in the decades prior to 1810, there was no native press reprinting the philosophy from abroad, or printing Chilean revolutionary material, until the arrival of the first native printing press in Chile in 1811.

However, after the successful rise to power of the first revolutionary Government Junta on September 18, 1810, the government, in the words of Hernández, "instinctively felt the need, if we may say so, for close contact with public opinion, which had not, in order to express itself, had any of the means with which we are familiar today." Locals in Chile had attempted to procure a printing press from the Spanish government and then under the Junta, attempts were made to purchase a printing press from the revolutionary junta in Buenos Aires, but were unsuccessful after the death of Mariano Moreno. Finally, on November 24, 1811, Swedish-American Mathew Hoevel (Spanish: Mateo Arnaldo Hoevel), an idealist for free government, landed the Galloway in the port of Valparaíso with a printing press, American printers, and arms and munitions to supply the troops of the independence movement. These printers, who included Samuel Burr Johnston, soon set to work publishing the Aurora de Chile, Chile's first local publication.

== The Aurora in circulation ==
The paper's first issue was published on February 13, 1812, under the direction of Camilo Henríquez González, who was not only the first editor of Chile's first periodical but also the first that had seriously argued for Chilean independence. It was the first widespread publication to introduce its readers in Chile to the Age of Enlightenment philosophies—Jean-Jacques Rousseau, Voltaire, and others—which informed Henríquez's writings. In writings authored by Manuel de Salas, Juan Egaña, Manuel José Gandarillas, and the Guatemalan Antonio José de Irisarri, the Aurora de Chile gave expression to the principles of popular sovereignty, self-governance and election of officials, separation of powers. The paper was also the vehicle for the sharp wit and timely commentaries by Camilo Henríquez on the happenings of the monarchy. The American influence was a major factor for Chile's liberal revolutionary intelligentsia, and the Aurora republished speeches by George Washington, Thomas Jefferson, James Madison, and other American revolutionaries, who became heroes in the Chilean press.

On April 1, 1813, the paper was transformed into El Monitor Araucano.
