= Aurora (Christian band) =

- Origin: U.S., UK
- Genre: Christian pop
- Years active: 2000–2002
- Labels: Red Hill, Pamplin
- Members: Lauren Smith; Rachel Smith; Racquel Smith

Aurora was an American Christian girl group that was made up of sisters Lauren, Racquel and Rachel Smith from Georgia. The sisters all played instruments, and wrote songs. The group released two major albums with labels Pamplin and Red Hill Records. Aurora in 2000 and Bigger than Us in 2001, and released singles "Mercy Me", “Bigger than Us”, and "Outta My Head", on both US and UK radio.

Their top single peaked at position #32 on Billboard music charts, and was #1 on the Christian hit Music chart (Src:air1). The band garnered a large airplay and fan base in the UK.

As performers, the sisters drew on their experience in theater, dance, instrumental music, and singing. They were among the early Christian pop groups to incorporate dance-oriented rhythms and stage choreography into their performances. They performed for audiences of up to 85,000 people. Their performances also featured vocal harmonies.

After years of professionally touring and performing, the group officially dissolved in 2004.

== Discography ==
=== Aurora (2000) ===
Aurora

Studio album by Aurora
- Released: August 29, 2000
- Genre: Christian pop
- Label: Red Hill Records

1. A World With You
2. Loving Me Like You Do
3. Finer Love
4. Mercy Me
5. Life In Your Hands
6. Forget Me Not
7. If You Didn't Love Me Anymore
8. Out of My Mind
9. Before the Throne of God
10. Different Drum

=== Bigger Than Us (2001) ===
Bigger Than Us

Studio album by Aurora
- Released: November 13, 2001
- Genre: Pop
- Label: The Pamplin Records

1. Just the Way You Are
2. The Way That You Love Me
3. I Dedicate This Heart to You
4. Bigger than Us
5. Turn It Around
6. Go On
7. Closer To You
8. Shout
9. Rekindle the Flame
10. Forever

== Singles ==
- "Mercy Me"
- "Outta My head"
- "A World With You"
