= Aurora Apartment Hotel =

Building in Texas, United States

Coordinates: 29.441305°N 98.495972°W

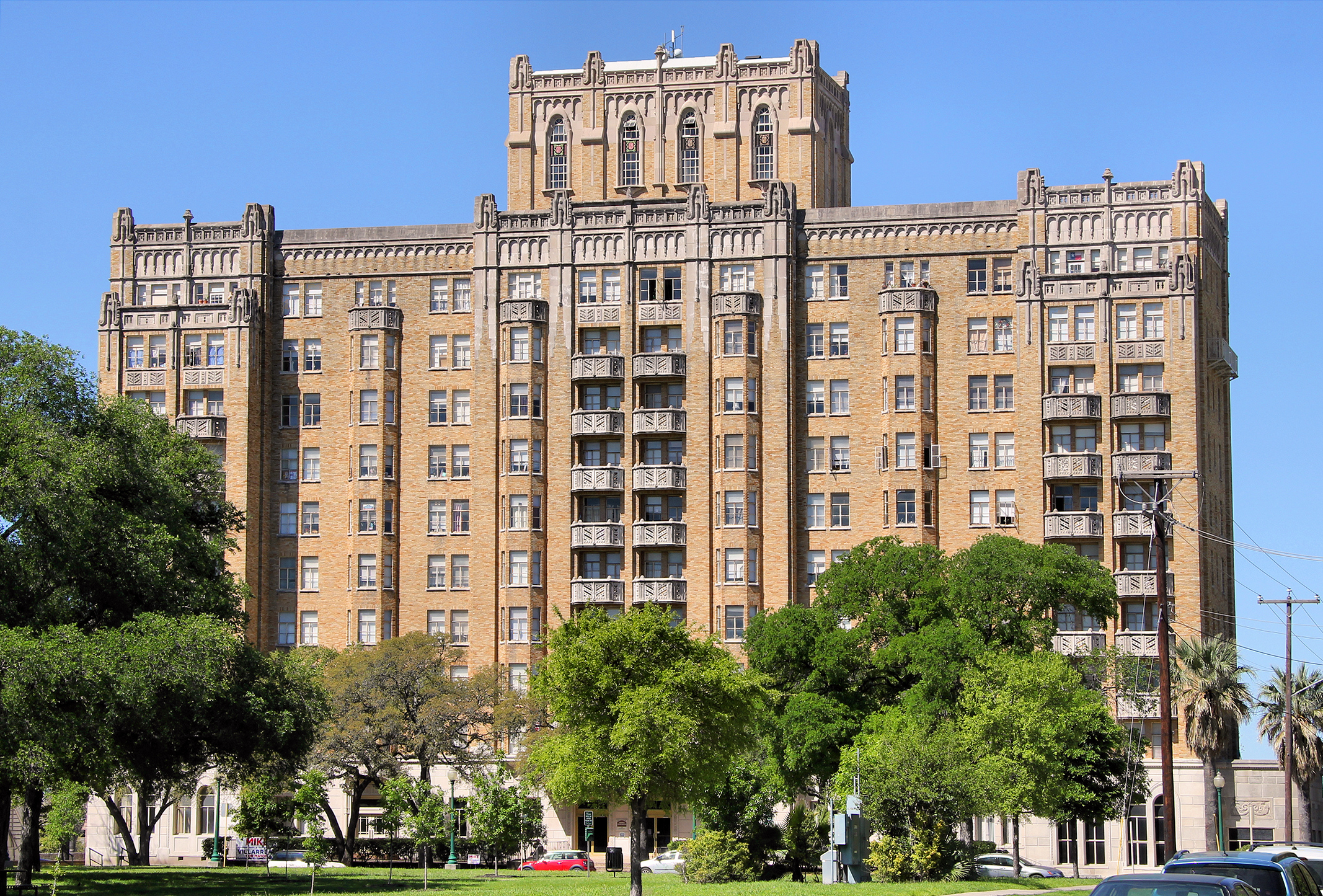
The Aurora Apartment Hotel

The Aurora Apartment Hotel (or simply the Aurora Hotel) is a historic, high-rise building located in the Tobin Hill neighborhood in San Antonio, Texas. The building is twelve stories high and the exterior is in the Neo-Gothic architectural style. The building was listed on the National Register of Historic Places on July 14, 2021.

On August 24, 1930, the Aurora opened its doors as one of San Antonio's grandest hotels of the time. The Aurora catered to the well-known and the well-to-do of the day, including Hollywood elite and former First Lady Mamie Geneva Doud Eisenhower.

In September 2007, Loopy, Ltd., a real estate company, purchased the Aurora building. Today, the Aurora is a 105-unit apartment complex, occupied almost exclusively by elderly and mentally and physically disabled residents. The Aurora is part of a list of qualifying properties for San Antonio's Section 8 housing. Due to its highly government-subsidized nature, the Aurora always enjoys 100% occupancy and a long wait list for new tenants.

It’s just like it was five years ago. Nothing’s happened in between. Not a thing… You got nothin’ to tell me cos it’s not real. Only you and me – that’s real. We’re having a drink in the bar at the Aurora Hotel, the band is playing, we’re celebrating cos we’re gettin’ married and after the wedding we’re gettin’ outta this hotel and we’re goin’ away so laugh Vienna and be happy – it’s your wedding day…

— Johnny Logan in Johnny Guitar
