= 37Games =

Browser and mobile game developer and publisher

- Company type: Public
- Founded: 2011
- Area served: Worldwide
- Industry: Browser game Mobile game Interactive entertainment
- Revenue: ▲CN¥6.19 billion (2017)
- Website: www.37.com

37Games (Chinese: 37游戏 officially Sanqi Interactive Entertainment Chinese: 三七互娱) is an international browser and mobile game developer and publisher. Its gaming platform covers North America, Europe, mainland China, Hong Kong, Taiwan, South Korea, and several Southeast Asia countries such as Malaysia, Thailand, Vietnam, Philippines and Singapore. 37Games is registered in Shanghai and has branch offices in Beijing, Guangzhou, Chengdu, Hong Kong, and Taiwan. In 2014, 37Games went public on China's A-Share stock market (Stock code: 002555).

37Games ranks no. 23rd amongst top 100 internet companies in China in 2015. 37Games is also the second biggest browser game platform behind Tencent, taking 13.3% in the Chinese browser game market share. By February 28, 2015, the registrations in mainland China alone had exceeded 400 million. 37Games' mainland China website operates over 300 games with monthly revenues exceeding 220 million CNY. 37Games is also the founder and host of the Chinese International Game Conference, which aims at providing a communication platform for gaming companies from around the globe.

37Games English platform currently has 9 browser-based games and 1 mobile game available. The growing portfolio includes browser games Guardians of Divinity, Felspire, Nightfalls, Siegelord and the mobile game Fusion War. 37Games also publishes games in the French market with Dawn Of Kings (Siegelord), Le Crépuscule des dieux (Guardians Of Divinity) and Felspire, and in the German market and Turkish language speaking market. In the first half of 2016, 37Games's Portuguese platform was slated to go live.

== History ==
In September 2011, 37Games was founded by Li Yi Fei and Zeng Kaitian.

In August 2014, authorized by Webzen and developed by 37Games, MU: The Archangel broke the record of Chinese browser game for 320 million RMB in revenue in just 60 days. In July 2014, MU: The Archangel was published in traditional Chinese for the Taiwan, Macau, and Hong Kong markets.

On August 1, 2015, 37Games announced they acquired the rights to adapt Korean publisher NCsoft's LineageII into a browser game for the Chinese market.

On August 6, 2015, 37Games Acquired SNK Playmore Corporation.

On December 18, 2015, 37Games published its first mobile game, Fusion War, in the global market on both the Google Play Store and Apple App Store. Fusion War is a 3D FPS developed by Tencent, featuring an engaging storyline that combines movie-like cut scenes, multi-mode gameplays, an advanced PvP system, and challenging Special Ops.
