= Aurora Borealis Express =

Express train in Finland

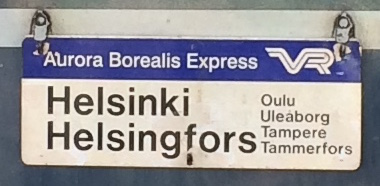

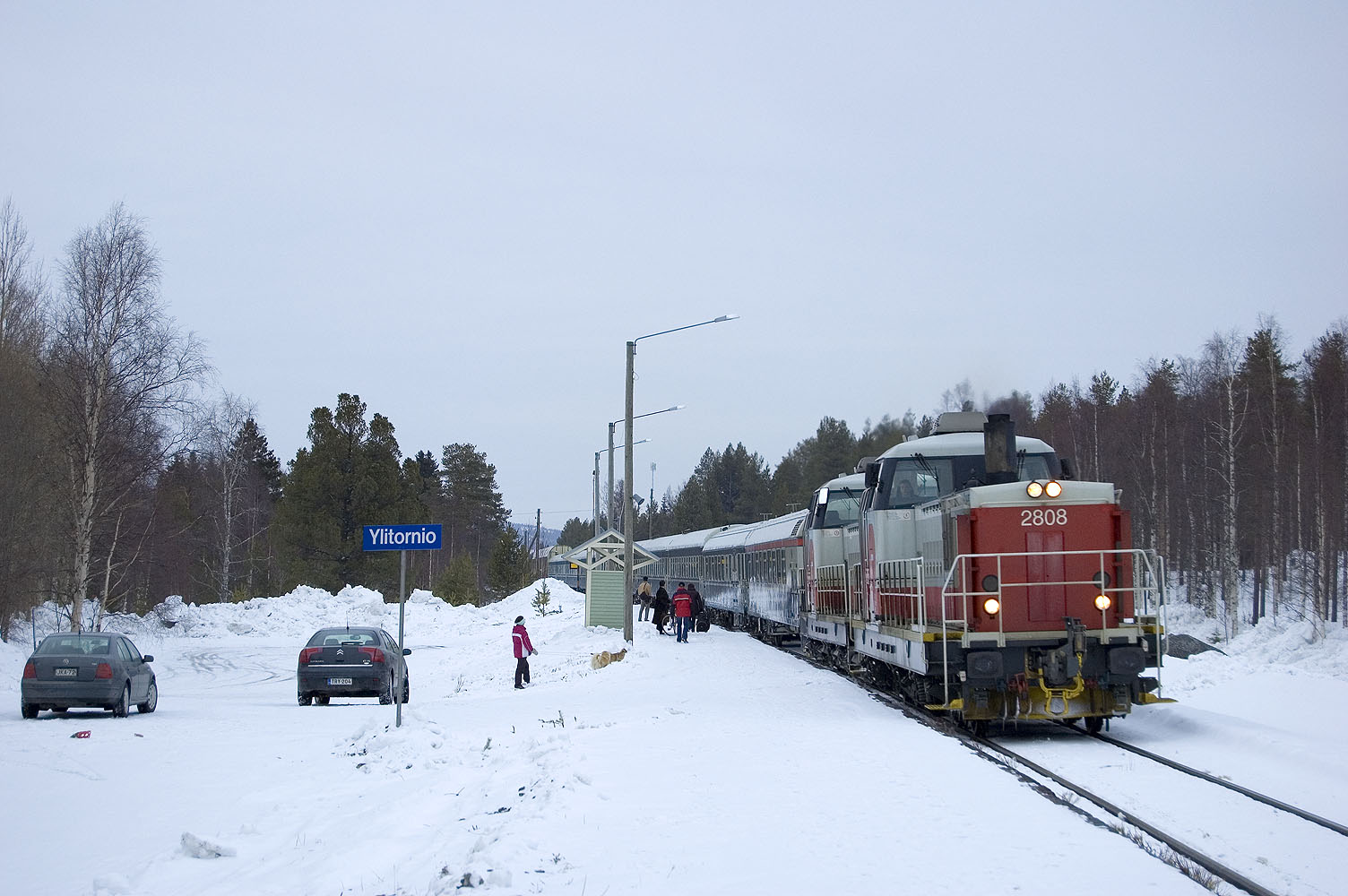
- Aurora Borealis Express in Ylitornio

Overview
- Status: Train service still active but the brand name not used by VR anymore
- Current operator: VR
- Ridership: 75 000 per year
- Website: https://www.vr.fi/yojunat

Route
- Termini: Helsinki; Kolari
- Stops: 16
- Distance travelled: 997 km
- Average journey time: 14 hours
- Service frequency: 0-2 trains per day
- Lines used: Helsinki-Riihimäki, Riihimäki-Tampere, Tampere-Seinäjoki, Pohjanmaa railway, Oulu-Tornio, Kolari railway

On-board services
- Classes: Eco-class, sleeper class.
- Seating arrangements: One seating car
- Sleeping arrangements: 6-10 sleeping cars
- Auto-rack arrangements: 2-4 car carrier wagons
- Catering facilities: Restaurant car
- Baggage facilities: Luggage compartment
- Other facilities: Servies for disabled people, telephone booths

Technical
- Rolling stock: VR blue cars and InterCity cars
- Track gauge: 1524 mm
- Operating speed: 140 km per hour
- Average length: 500 m
- Track owner: VR
- Timetable numbers: 263-262 & 269-270/272/276

The Aurora Borealis Express is an overnight express train operating between Helsinki and Kolari in Finland. The train travels via many major cities and towns in Finland, and stops at most of them. The total distance is a little under 1000 kilometers, and lasts for 14½ hours to 16 hours depending on direction and season. The service is bi-directional, with a corresponding train operating southwards over the same route.

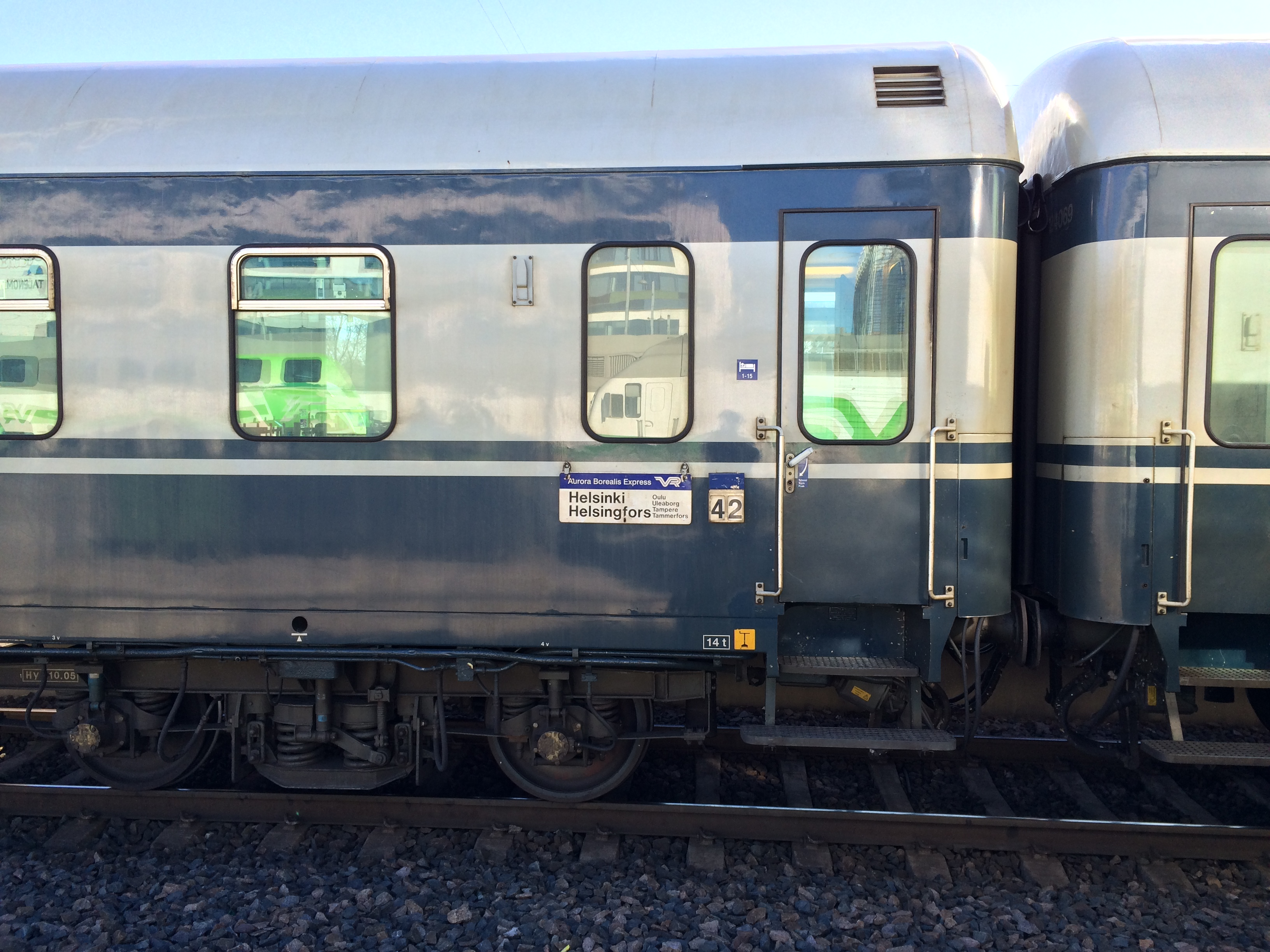
Sleeping cars on the train.

The train consists of seven to ten sleeping cars, two open seating cars and one restaurant car. The sleeper cars are a mix of old blue cars and new intercity double decker cars. The restaurant car and coach class car are modern intercity cars, with the restaurant being a single decker car and the coach car a double decker one. The service is the last one that uses blue sleeper cars outside of the peak season making the cars quite rare. A few car carrier wagons are added at the end of the train to transport cars. On the last distance from Oulu to Kolari the electric locomotive is switched out for a diesel locomotive since the railway line to Kolari isn't electrified.

The train travels northbound and southbound on varying days of the week, depending upon the time of year. Passenger demand is variable, and somewhat seasonal.

The Finnish railroad network.

== Stops ==
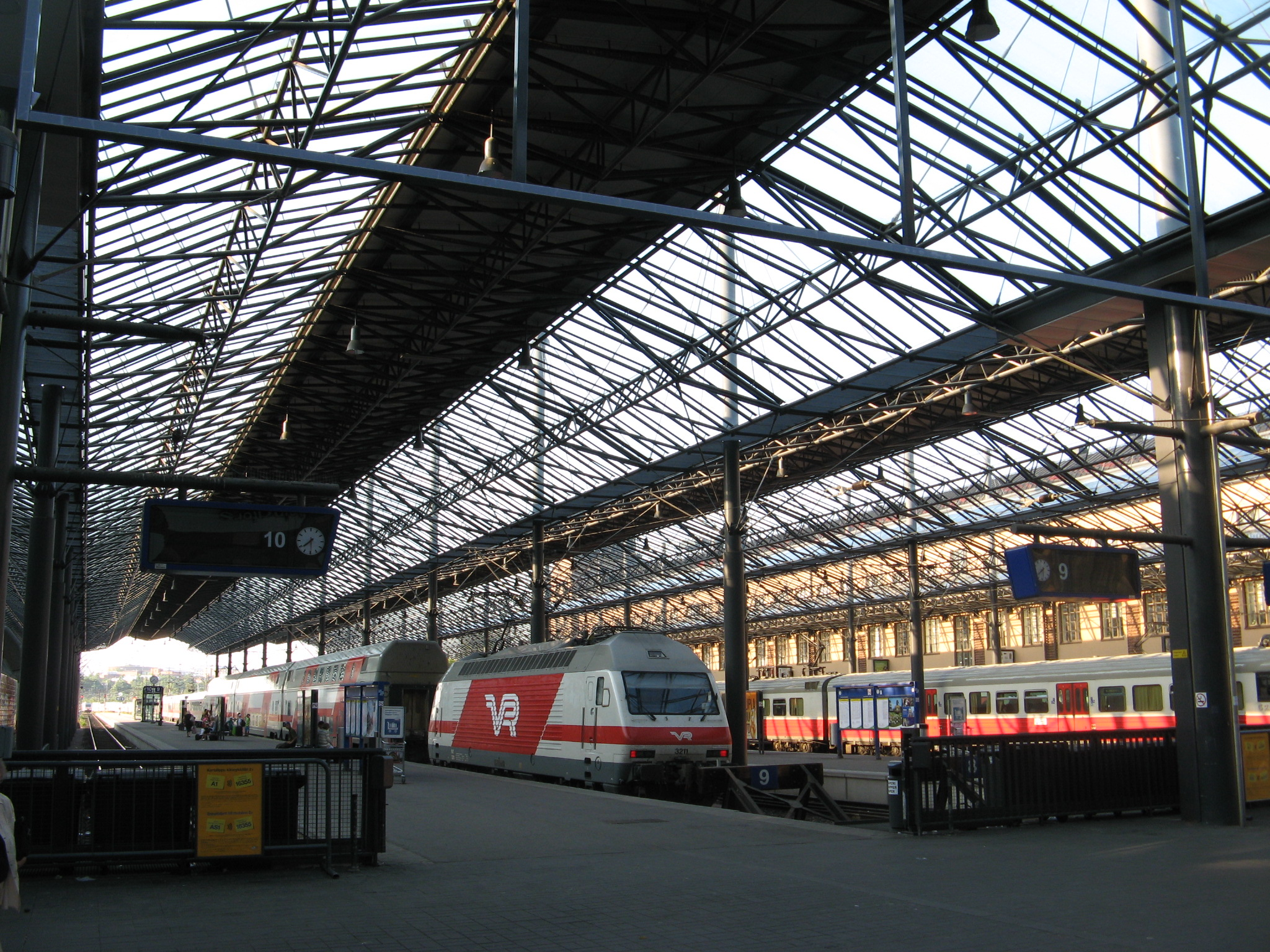
Helsinki Helsingfors

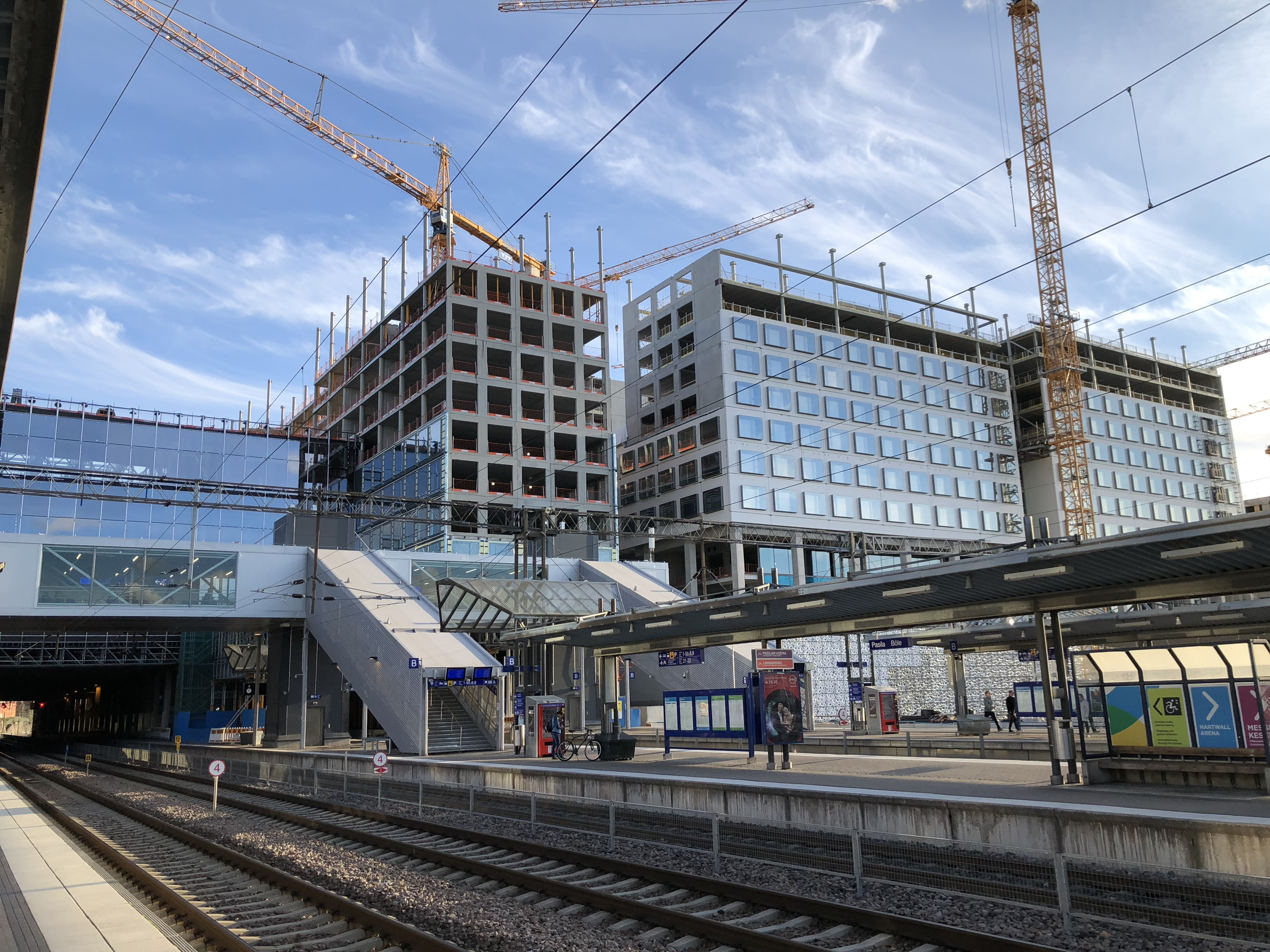
Pasila Böle

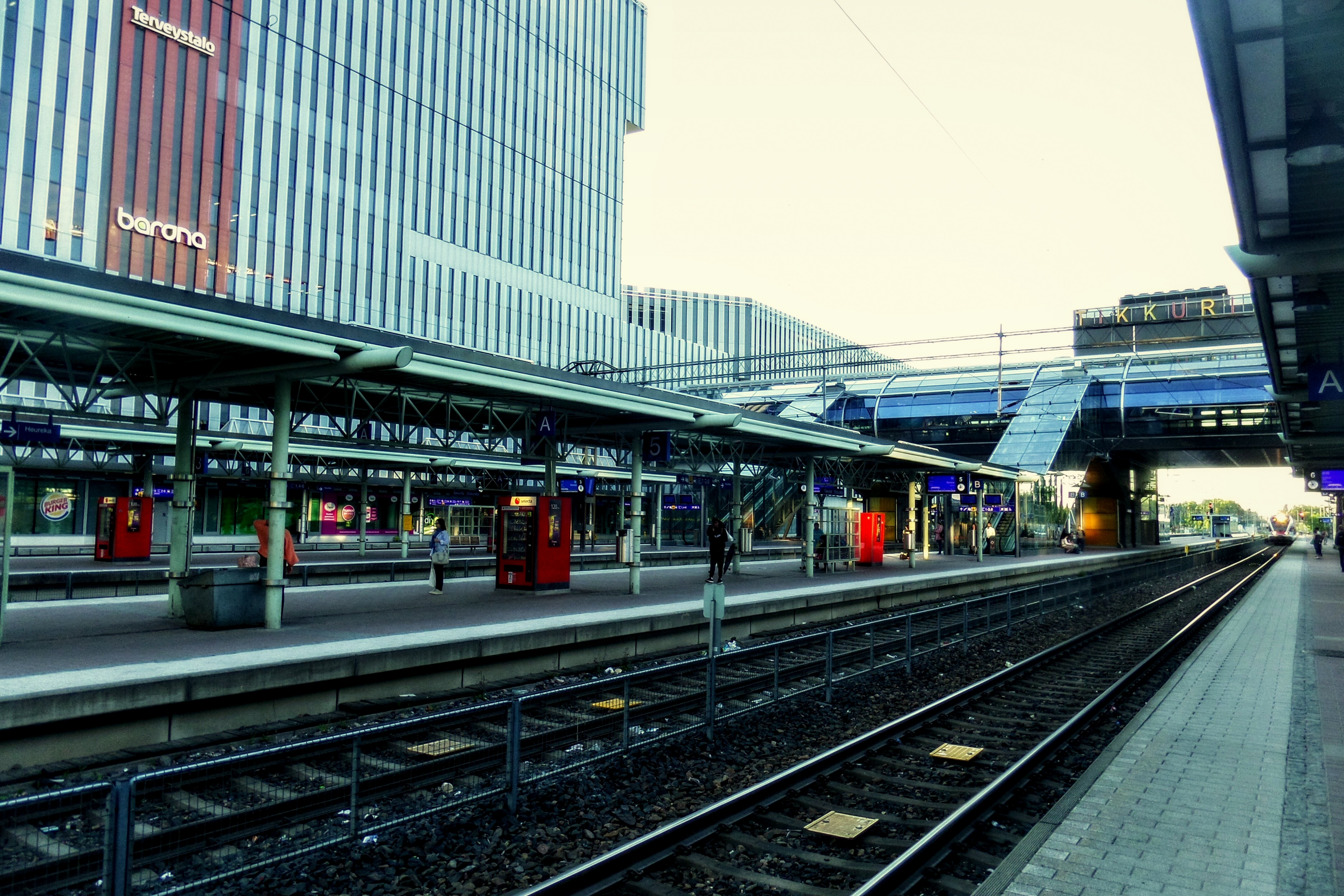
Tikkurila Dickursby

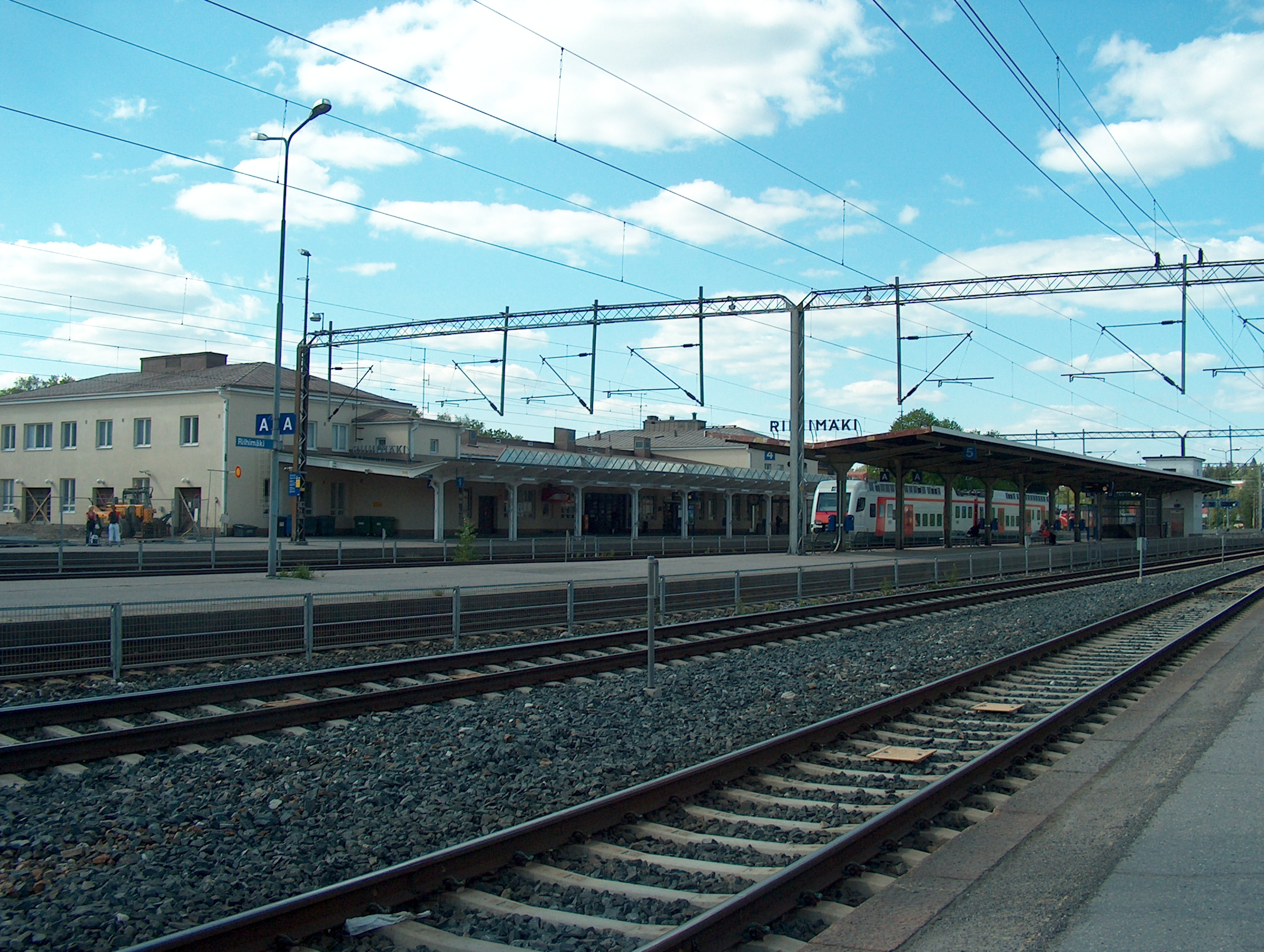
Riihimäki

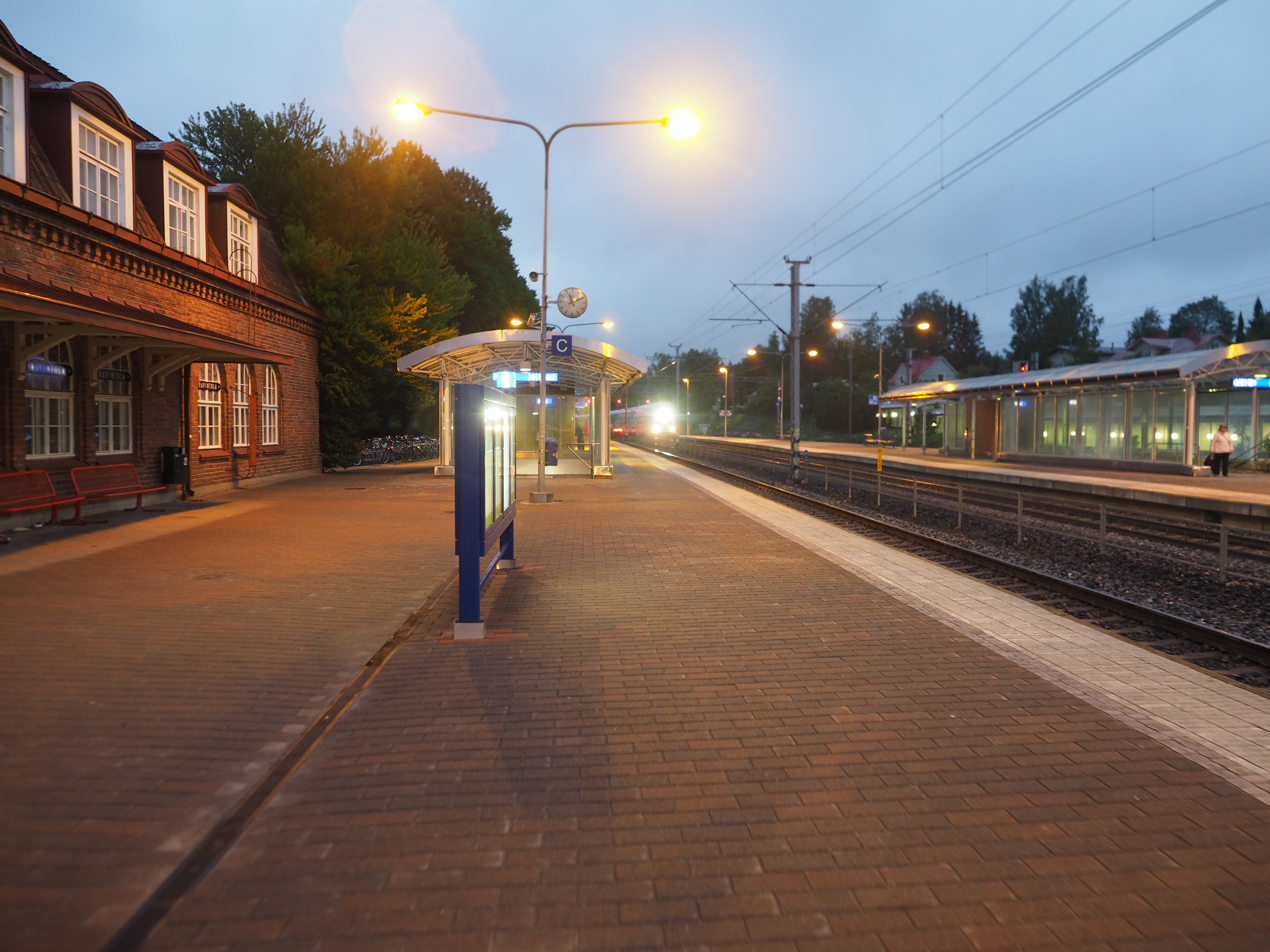
Hämeenlinna Tavastehus

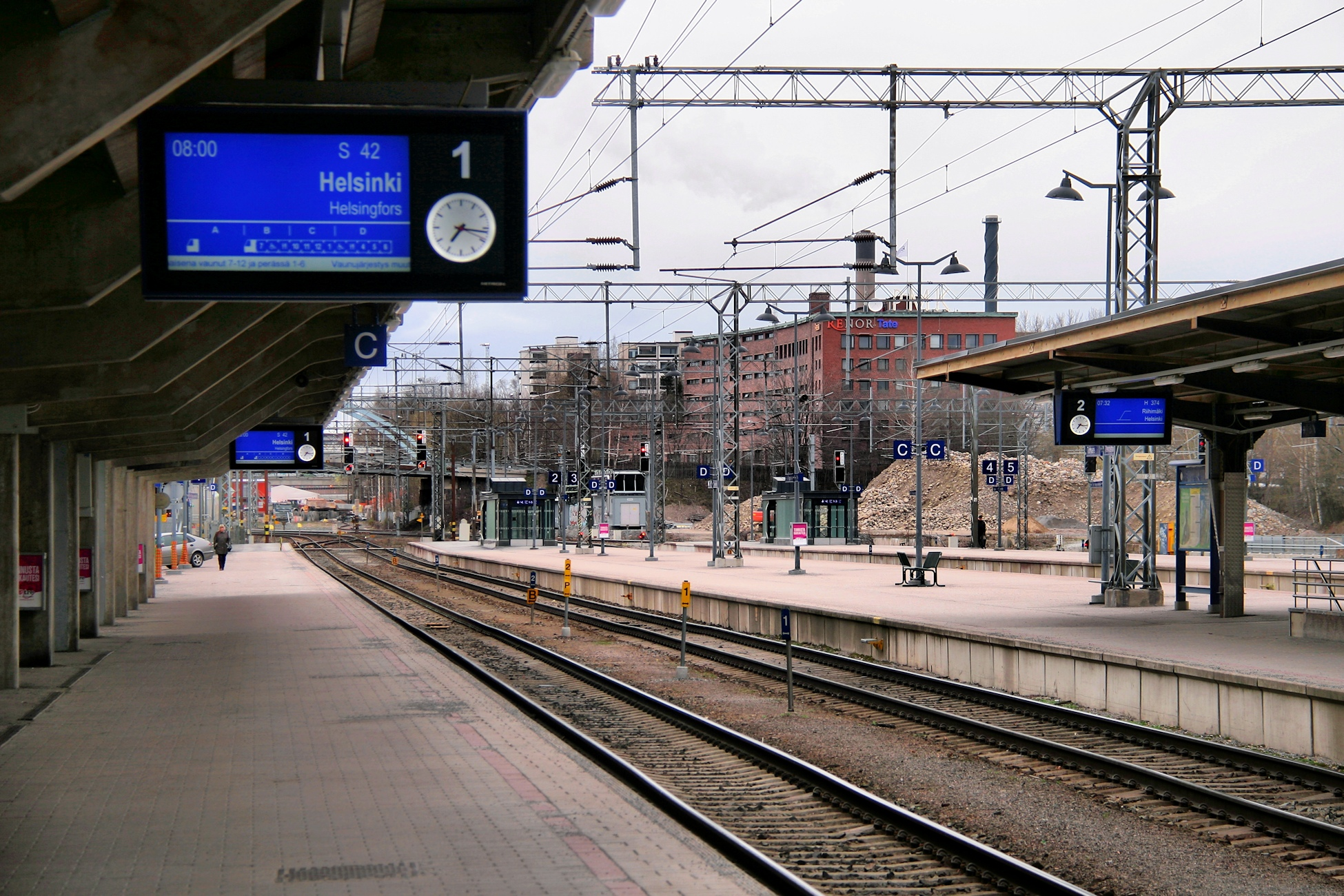
Tampere Tammerfors

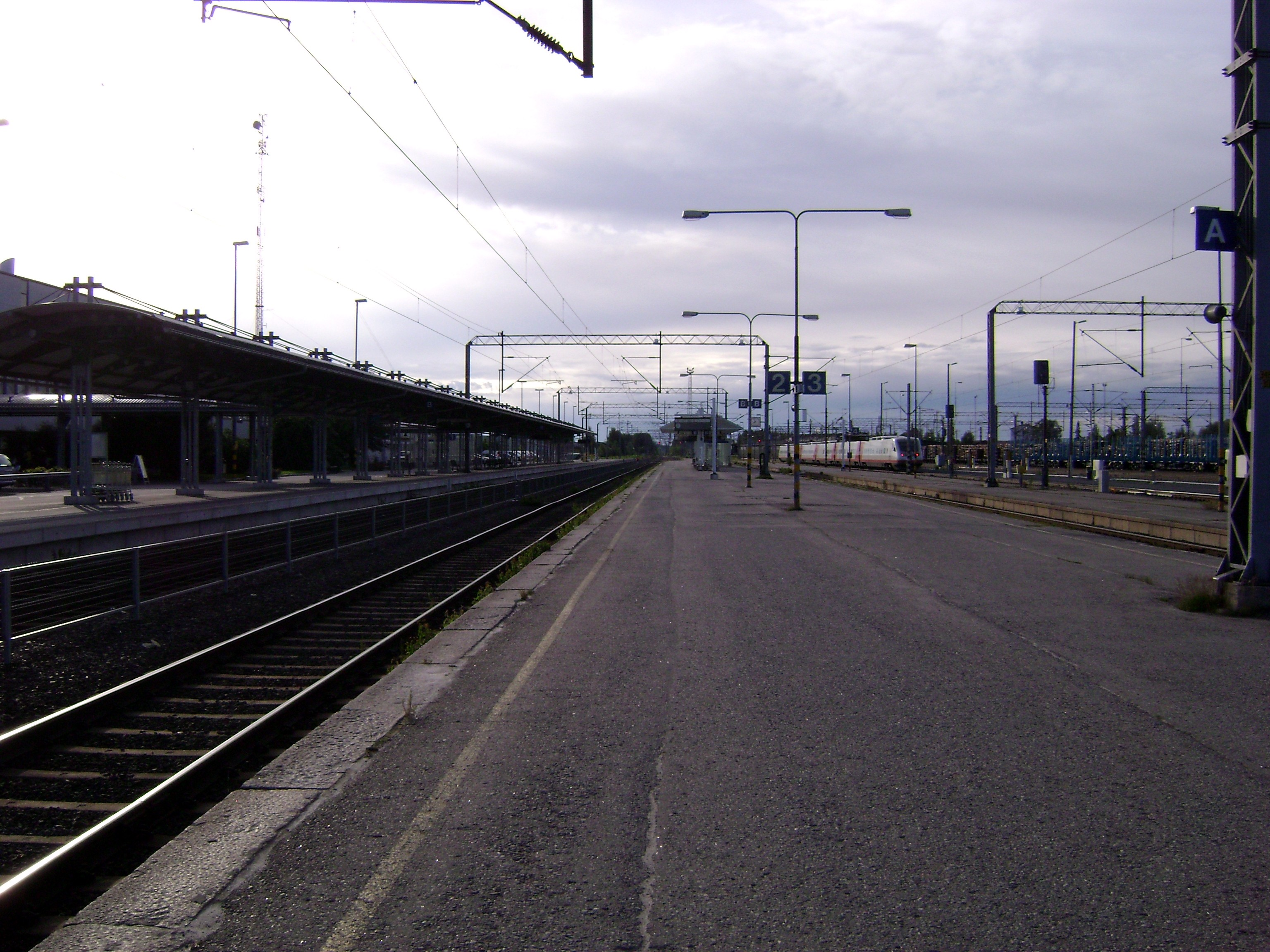
Seinäjoki

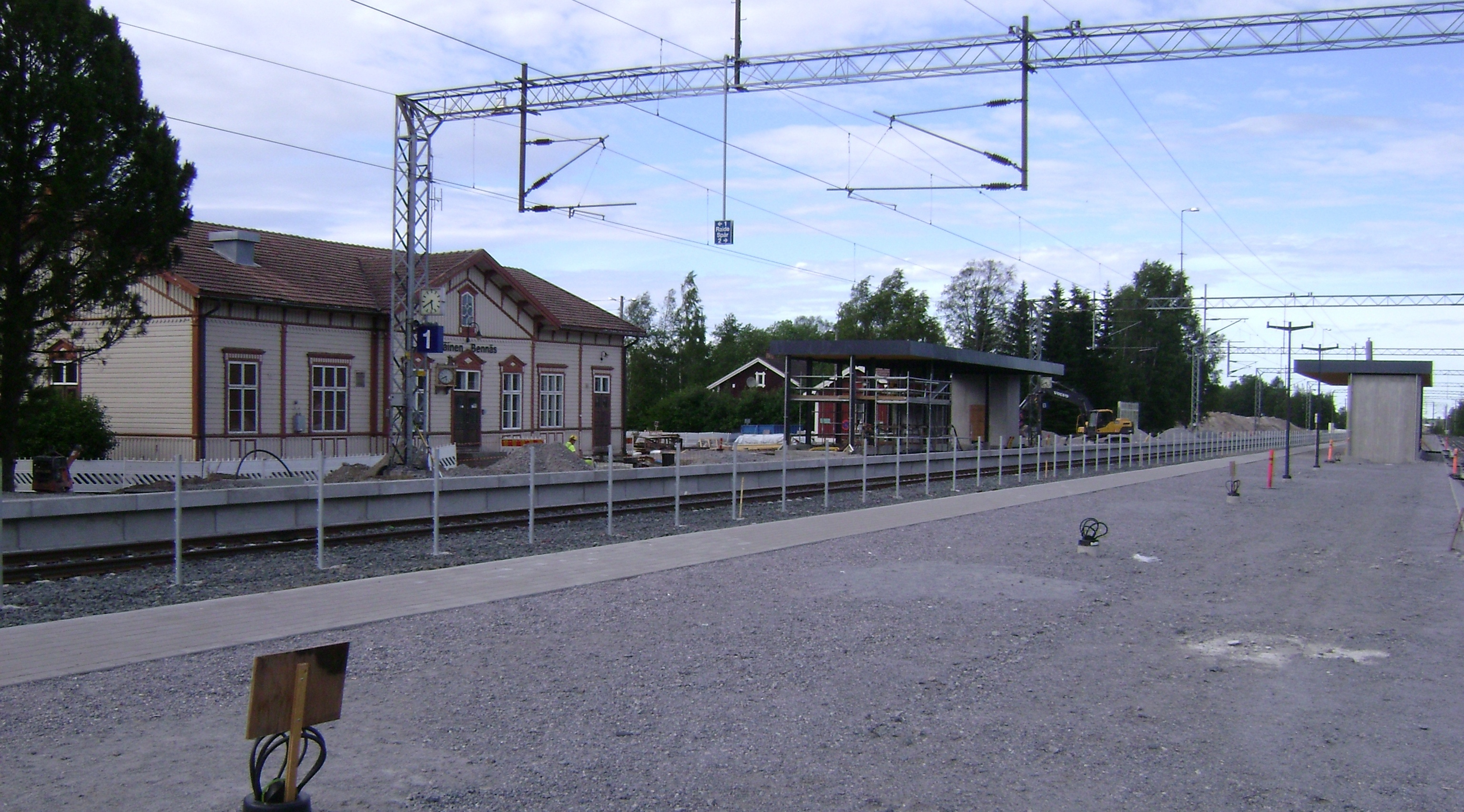
Pännäinen Bennäs

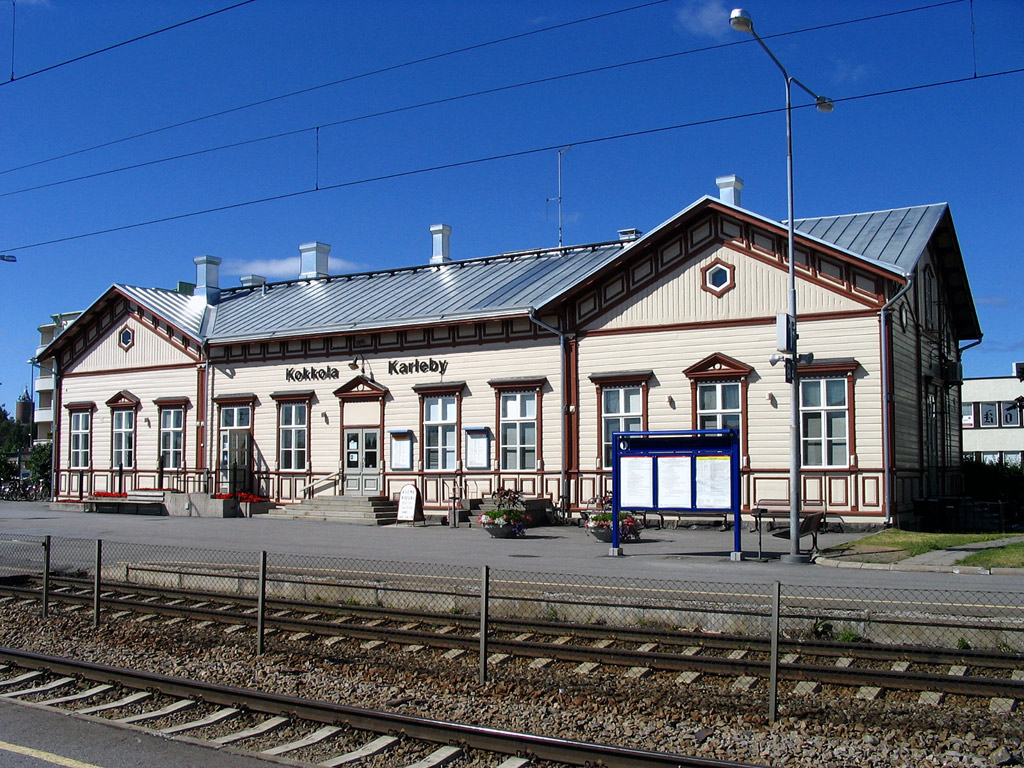
Kokkola Karleby

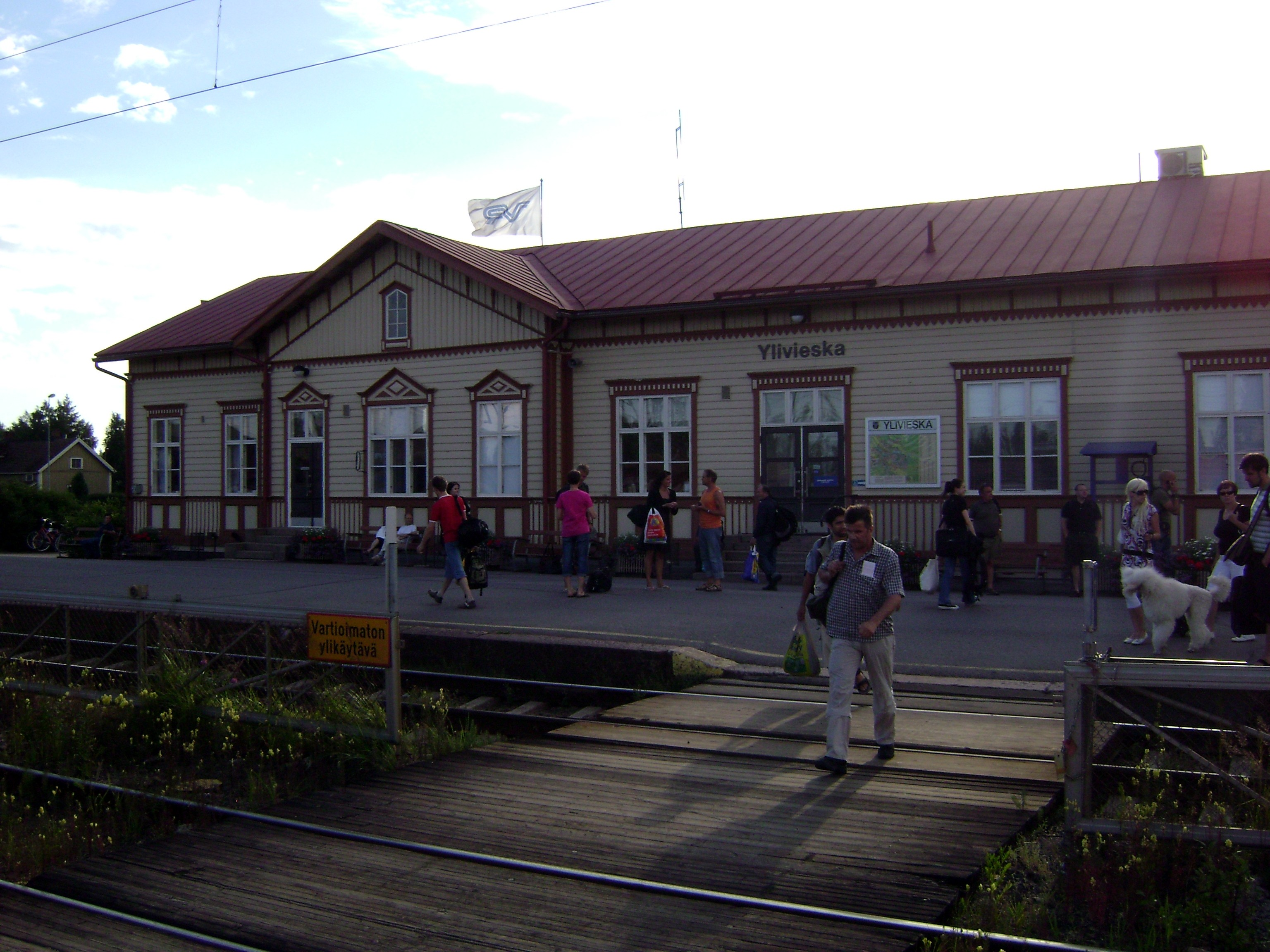
Ylivieska

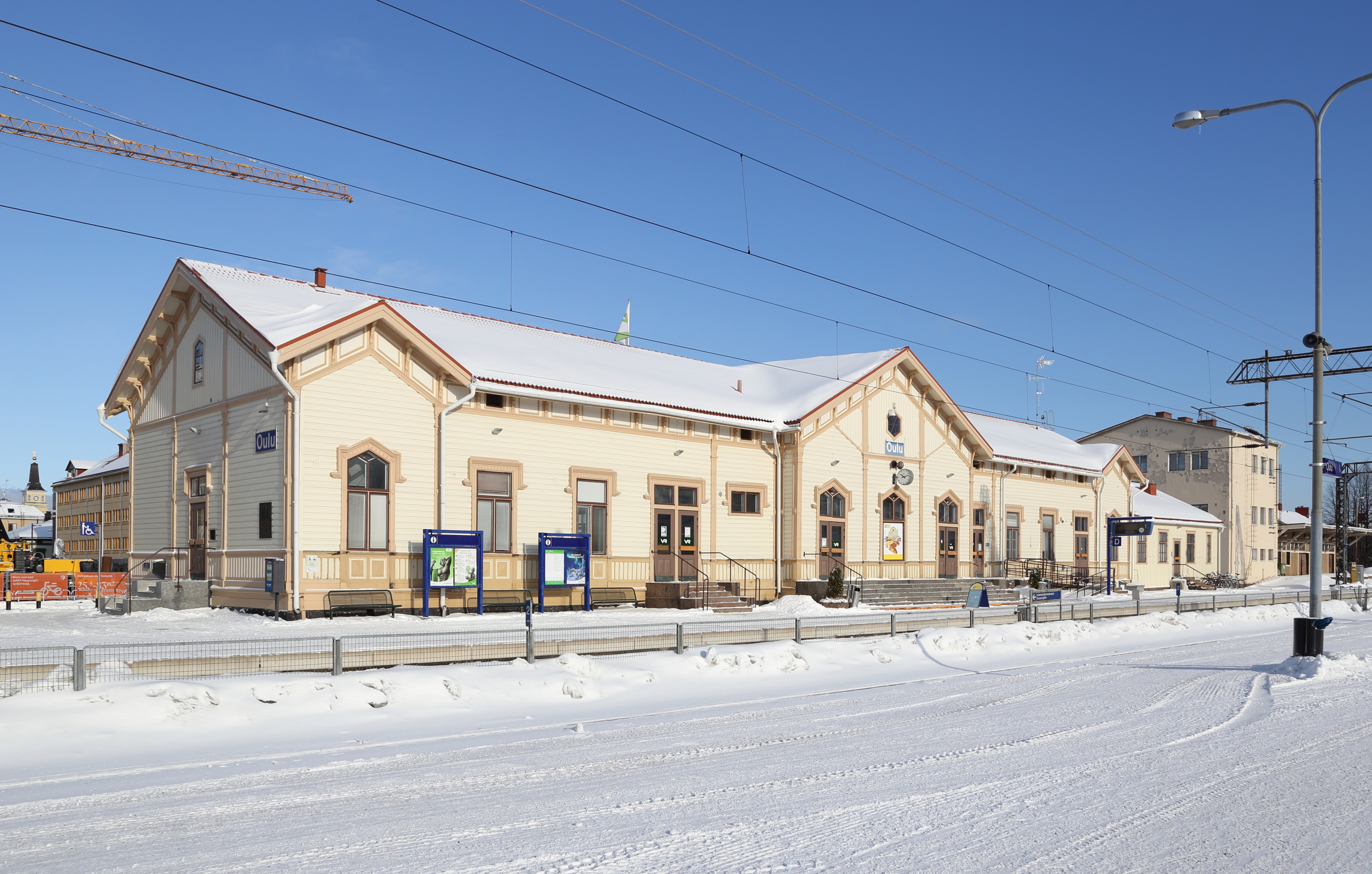
Oulu Uleåborg

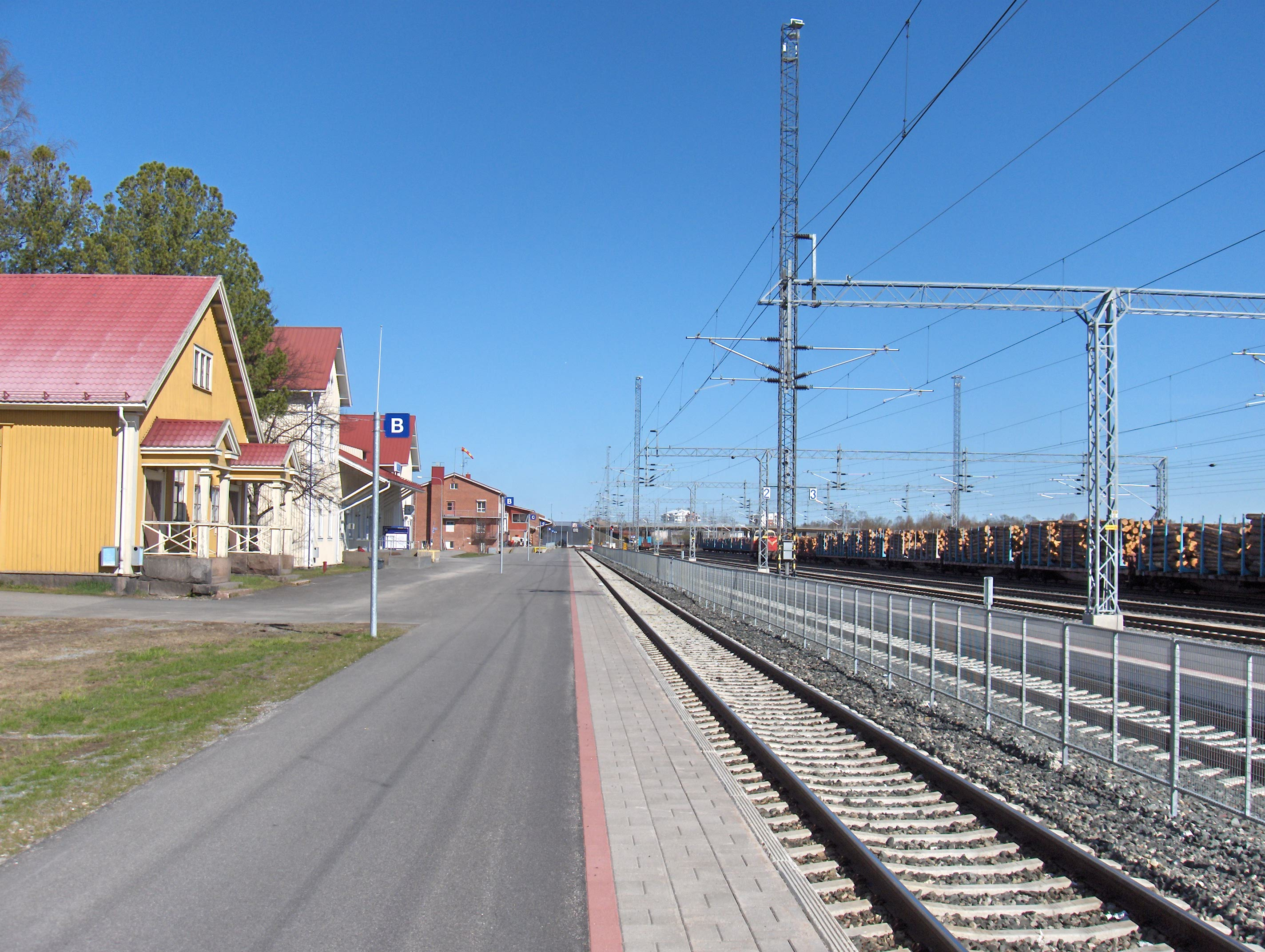
Kemi

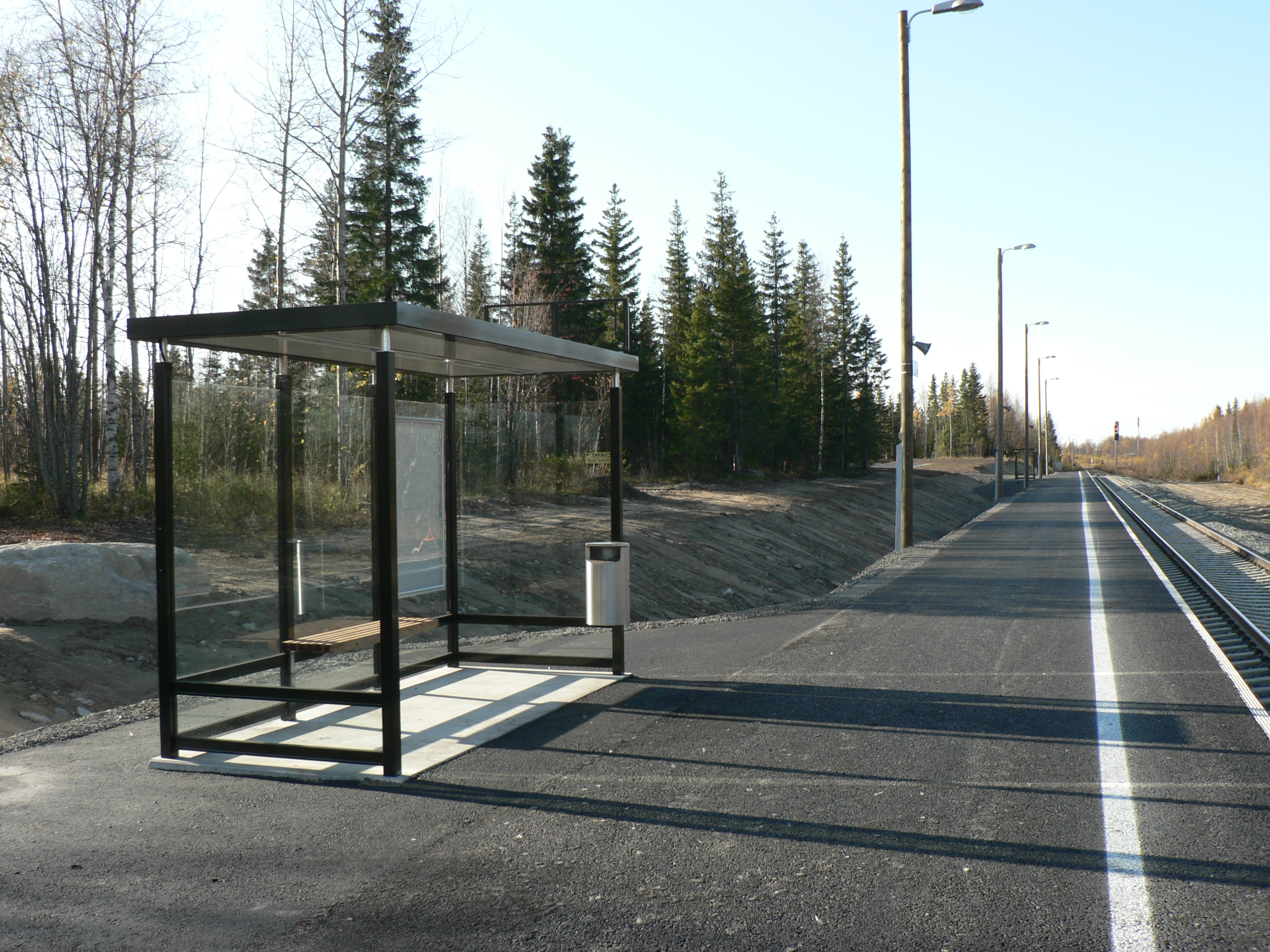
Tornio-Itäinen Torneå Östra

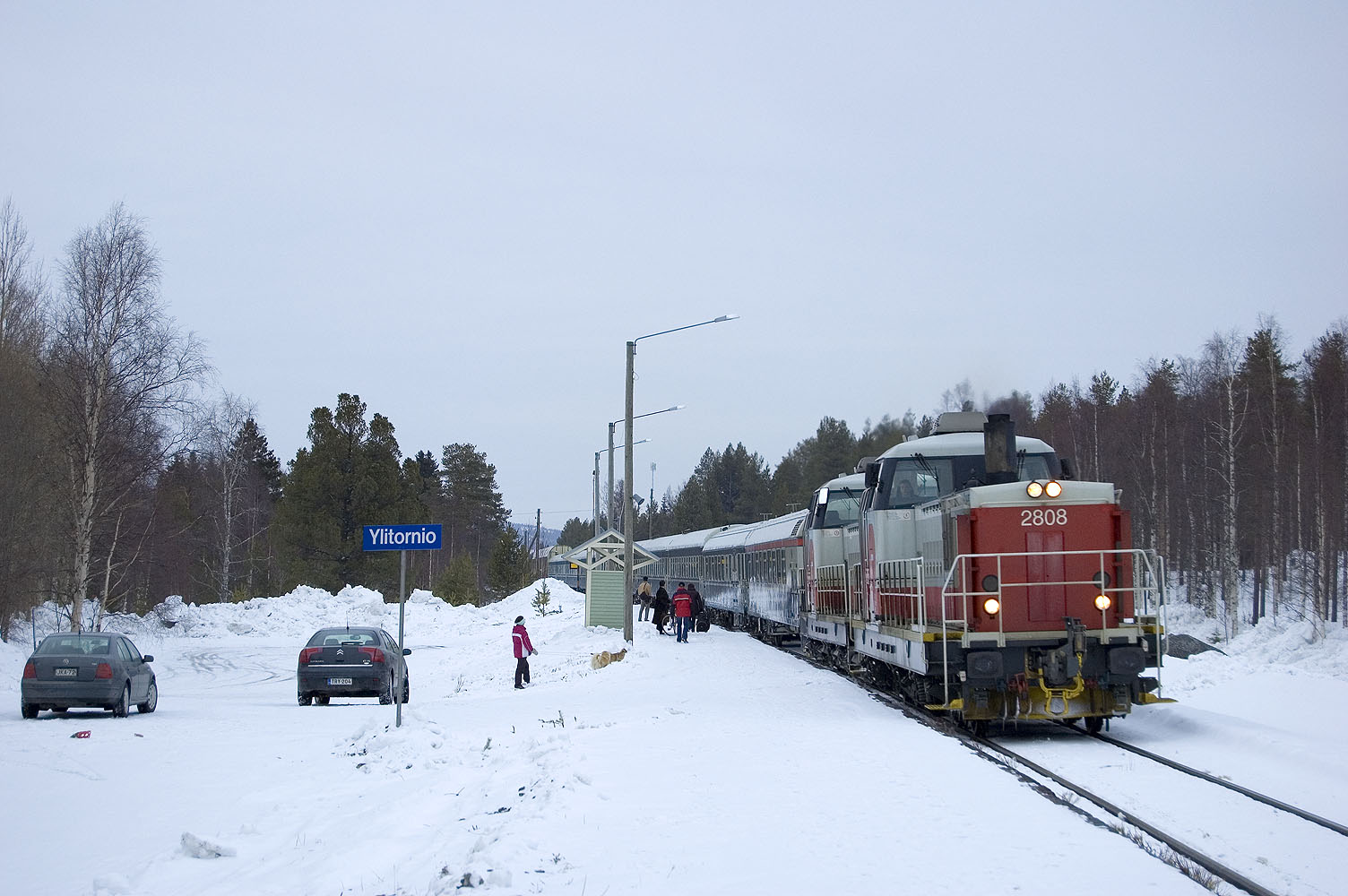
Ylitornio Övertorneå

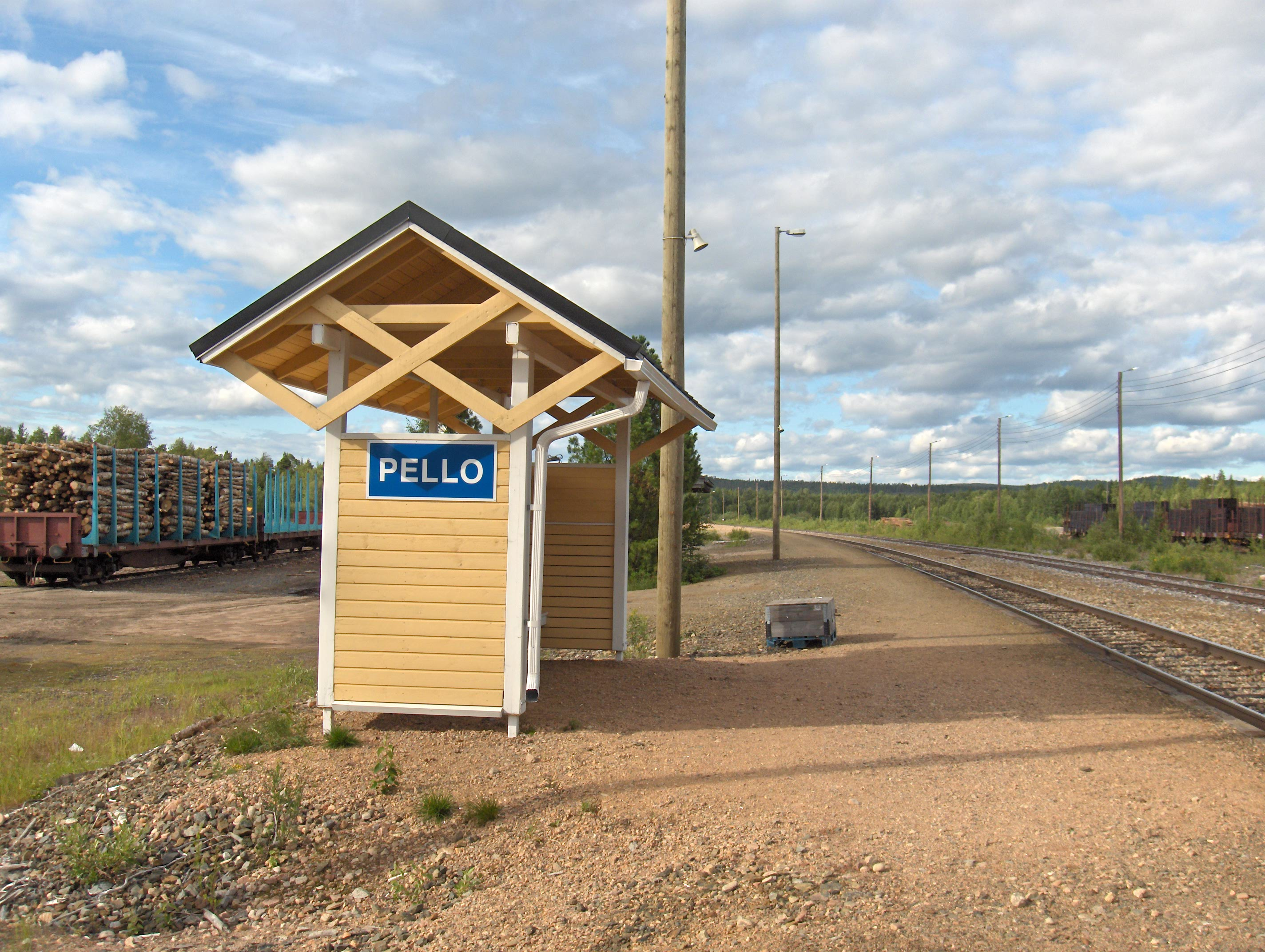
Pello

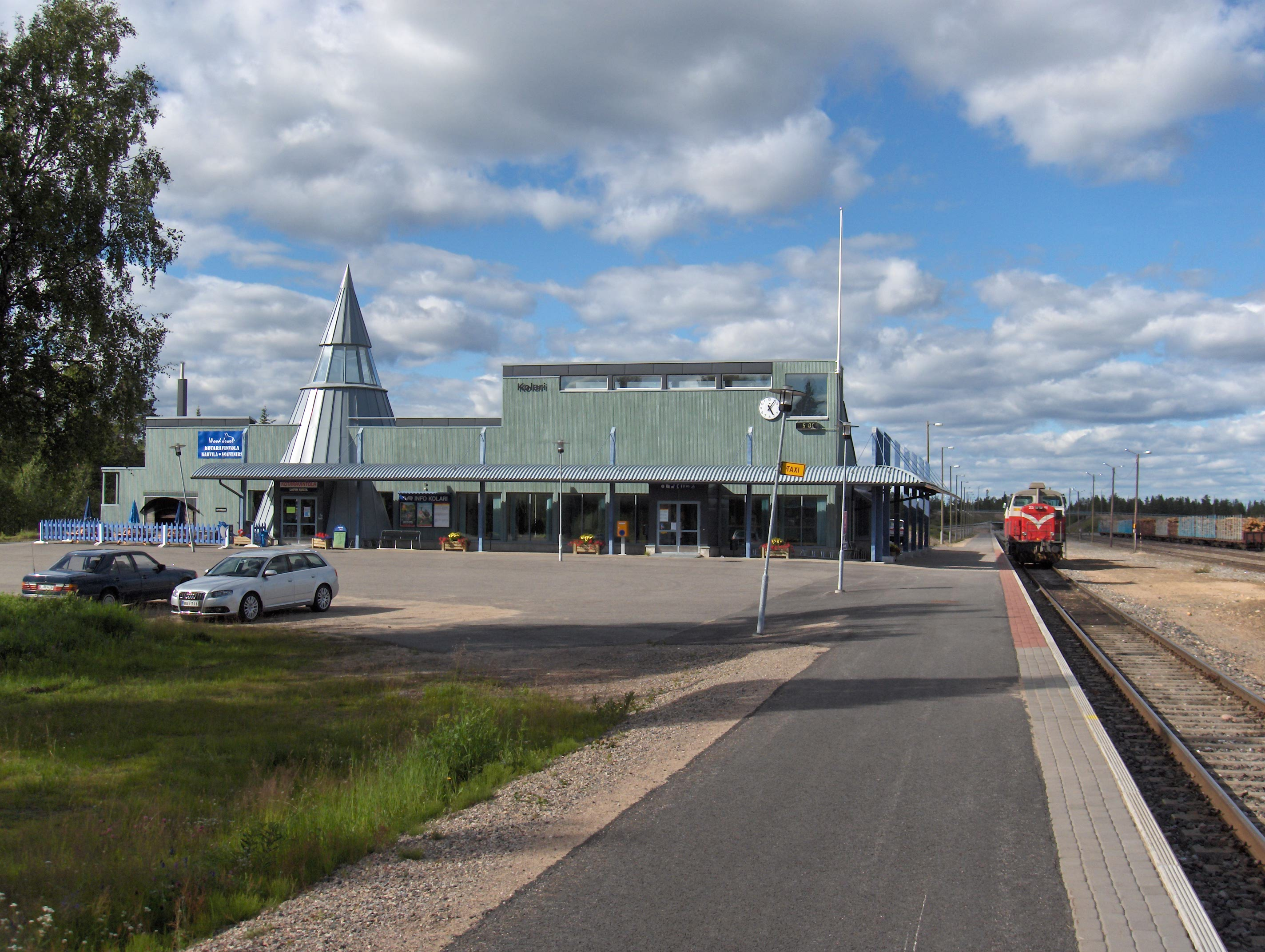
Kolari

== See also ==
- List of named passenger trains of Europe
