= Eil =

Eil may refer to:

== Places ==
- Eil (crater), on Mars
- Eil, Cologne, a quarter of Cologne, Germany
- Eil, Somalia
- Eil District, Somalia
- Loch Eil, a lake in Scotland

== Other uses ==
- Eastern Independent League, an American high school sports conference
- Eielson Air Force Base, near Fairbanks, Alaska
- Energy input labeling
- Engineers India Limited
- English as an International Language
- Eurostar International Limited, European company, operating high-speed international rail services
- Experiment in International Living
- Electronic Information and Transactions Law in Indonesia
- Peter Eil (1917–1965), German soldier during World War II
- VR Class Eil, a Finnish railway coach
