= VR blue carriages =

Long-distance passenger cars in Finland

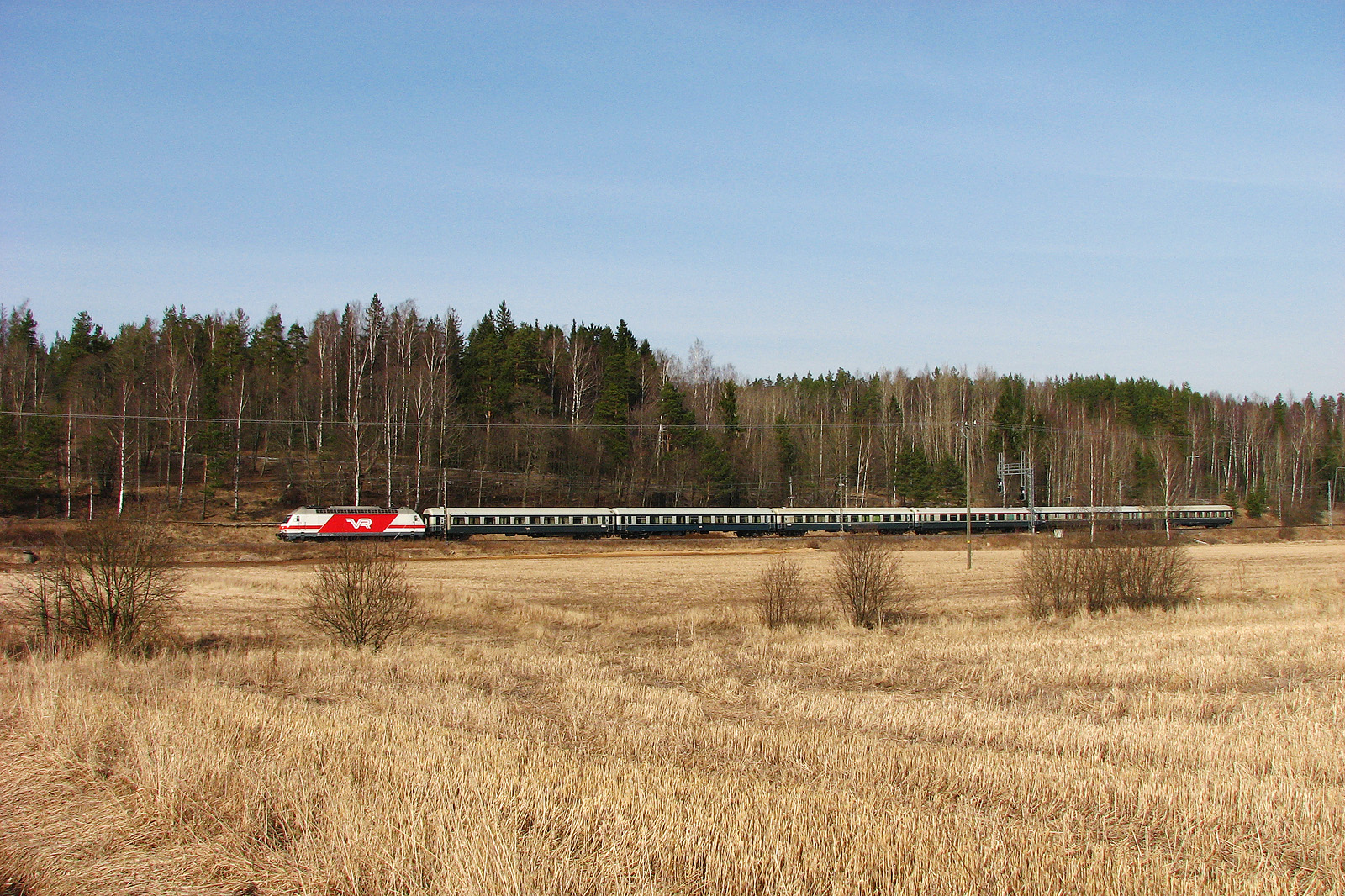
An express train consisting of blue cars in Kauklahti, Espoo

The blue carriages are passenger cars built between 1961 and 1987 used by VR for long-distance passenger travel in Finland.

== History ==
The first 15 units were built in Germany by Maschinenfabrik Esslingen in 1961. The model was later copied by VR and manufacturing started in VR's own machine workshop in Pasila in 1964. Over 600 units were built up until 1987. Most are capable of speeds up to 140 to 160 kilometers of hour. They are slowly being phased out in favour of the more modern InterCity-coaches. Some are still used in night trains from Helsinki to Kolari and Rovaniemi and in commuter trains from Helsinki to Kouvola.

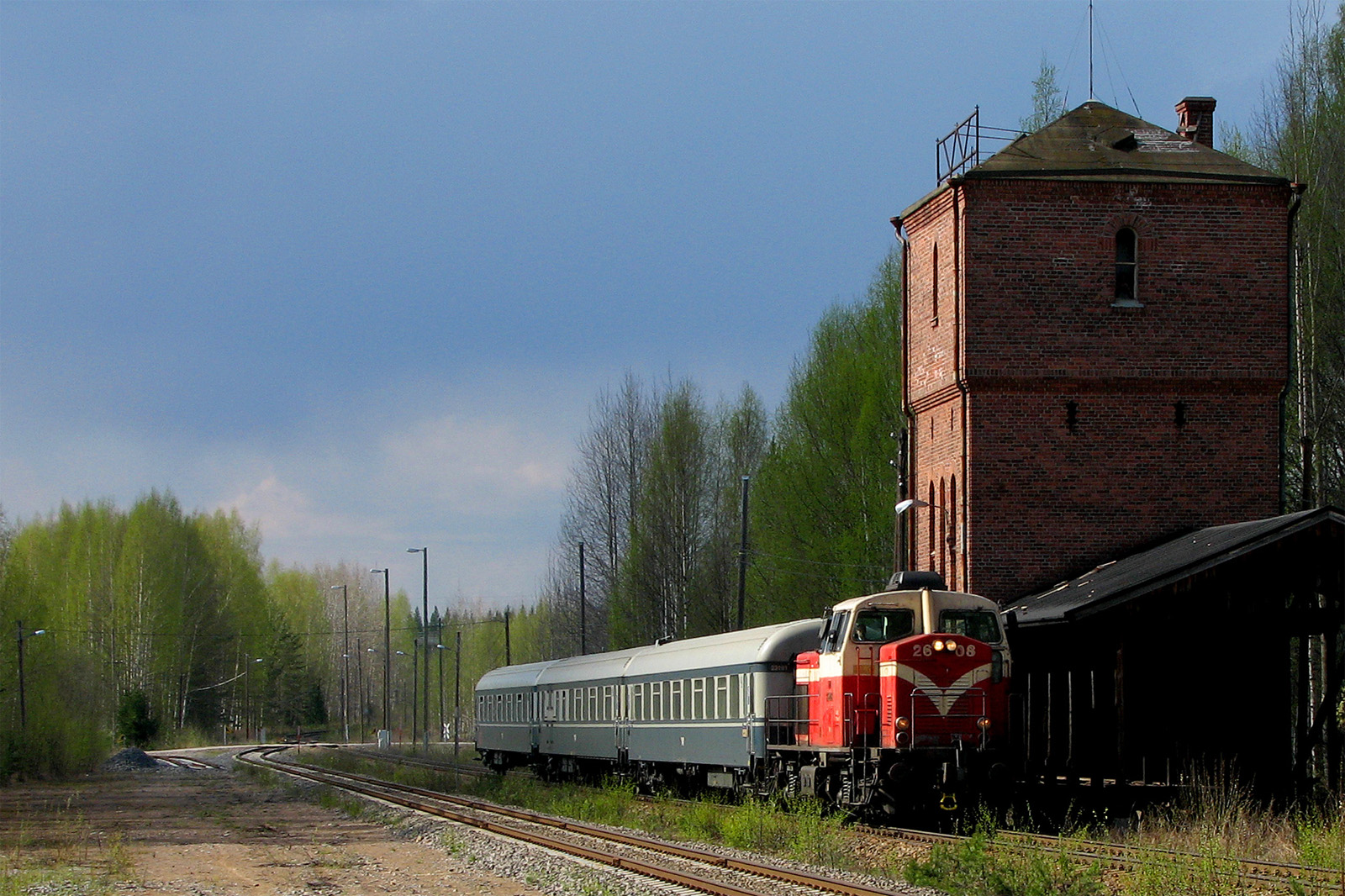
A regional train with blue cars in Huutokoski.

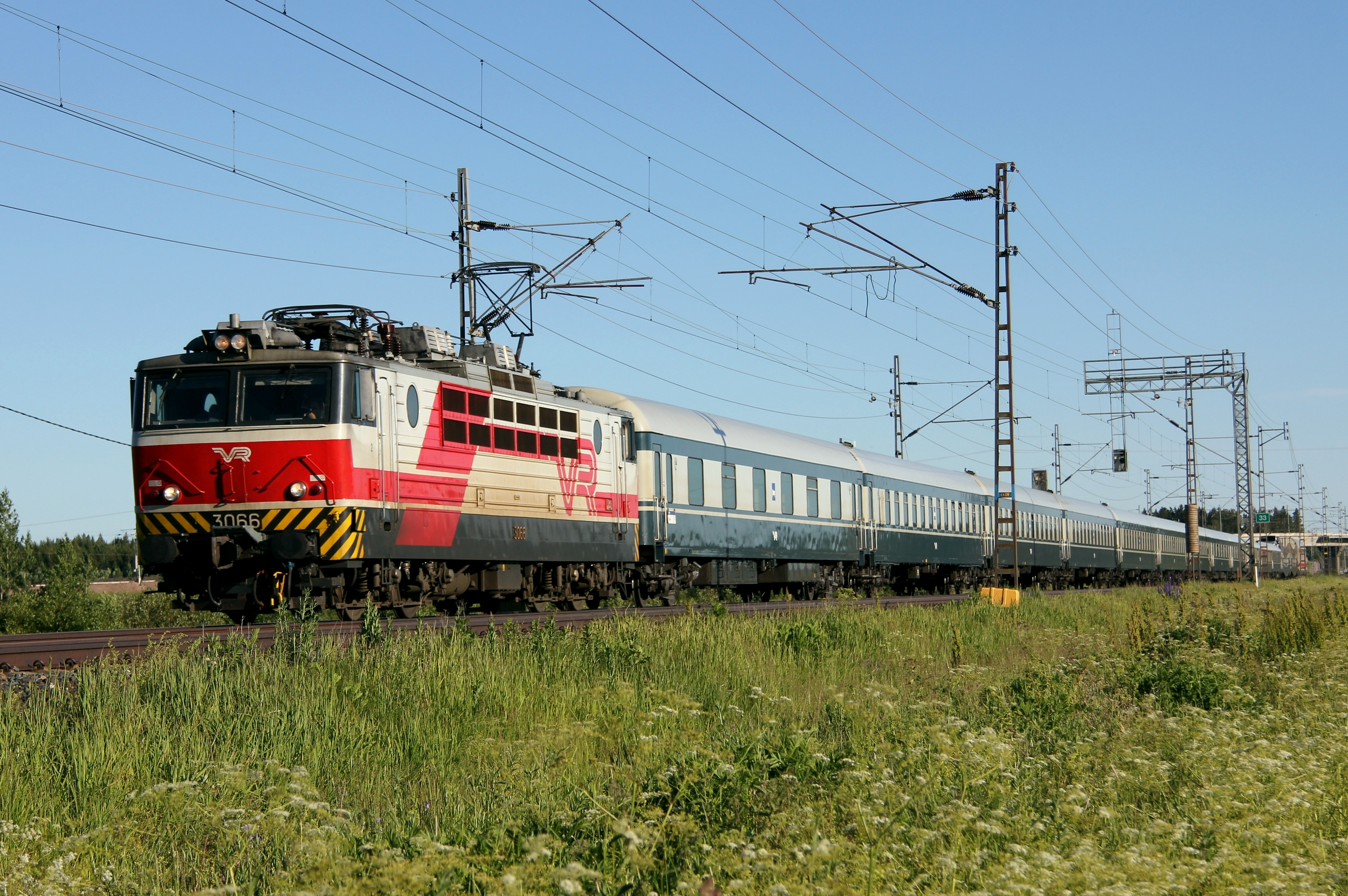
A night train with sleeping blue cars in Tuusula.

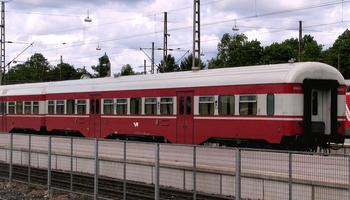
A commuter train with blue cars at Helsinki Railway Station. Though referred to as blue cars, commuter cars were originally actually painted red.

== List of cars currently used in passenger trains ==
Name	Outside image	Inside image	Description	Years built	Seats
Eipt			Eco-class car with a lounge compartment for pets, a luggage cabin and telephone booths. They were built from 1975 to 1976 as second-class express train cars. In the 1980s they were upgraded to first class. They were refurbished in 1997-2000, and the interior of the cars were changed to a modern InterCity-style. This was short-lived however, as in 2004 they were reverted to Eco-class and the former first class lounge made into a space for pets. They are currently used from December to April in night trains from Helsinki to Kolari.	1975-1976	46
Rk			Restaurant car. Originally built as standard express train restaurant cars, they were refurbished in 1996–1998, given a 1960s interior theme and painted in red-white InterCity-colors. Currently used from December to April in night trains from Helsinki to Kolari.	1975-1976	40
EFits and EFs			Eco-class car with luggage compartment and conductor's cabin. They were painted in VR:s standard green-white theme in 2010–2012. Currently used in night trains from Helsinki to Kolari and Rovaniemi.	1985-1986	46
EFiti			Eco-class car with luggage compartment and conductor's cabin, with specialized entrances, seats and a toilet for wheelchair users. The features for wheelchair users where added in 1991–1995. Currently used from December to April in night trains to Kolari and occasionally in night trains to Rovaniemi.	1980-1981	46, of which 3 are for wheelchairs
Eil			Commuter traffic car. They were refurbished and painted in VR:s green-white theme in 2011–2013. Currently used in commuter trains from Helsinki to Kouvola and Kouvola to Helsinki.	1982-1987	113
Eilf			Commuter traffic car with conductor's cabin. They were refurbished and painted green-white in 2011–2013. Currently used in commuter trains from Helsinki to Kouvola and Kouvola to Helsinki.	1982-1987	93
CEmt			Sleeping car. The roof on the sleeping cars is higher than any other cars to be able to fit 3 beds on top of each other in the cabins, and is not corrugated like the rest of the cars. Currently used in night trains to Kolari and occasionally in night trains to Rovaniemi.	1978-1984	35 beds
De			Generator car. Is coupled to diesel locomotives on non-electrified tracks, to give electric power to the train. Originally built as a luggage car, but fitted with a generator and painted in a red-white InterCity-livery in 2008 since VR needed more generator cars. Currently used in night trains from Helsinki to Kolari. The generator cars are coupled together with the rest of the train in Oulu, since the track to Kolari is not electrified.	1984	

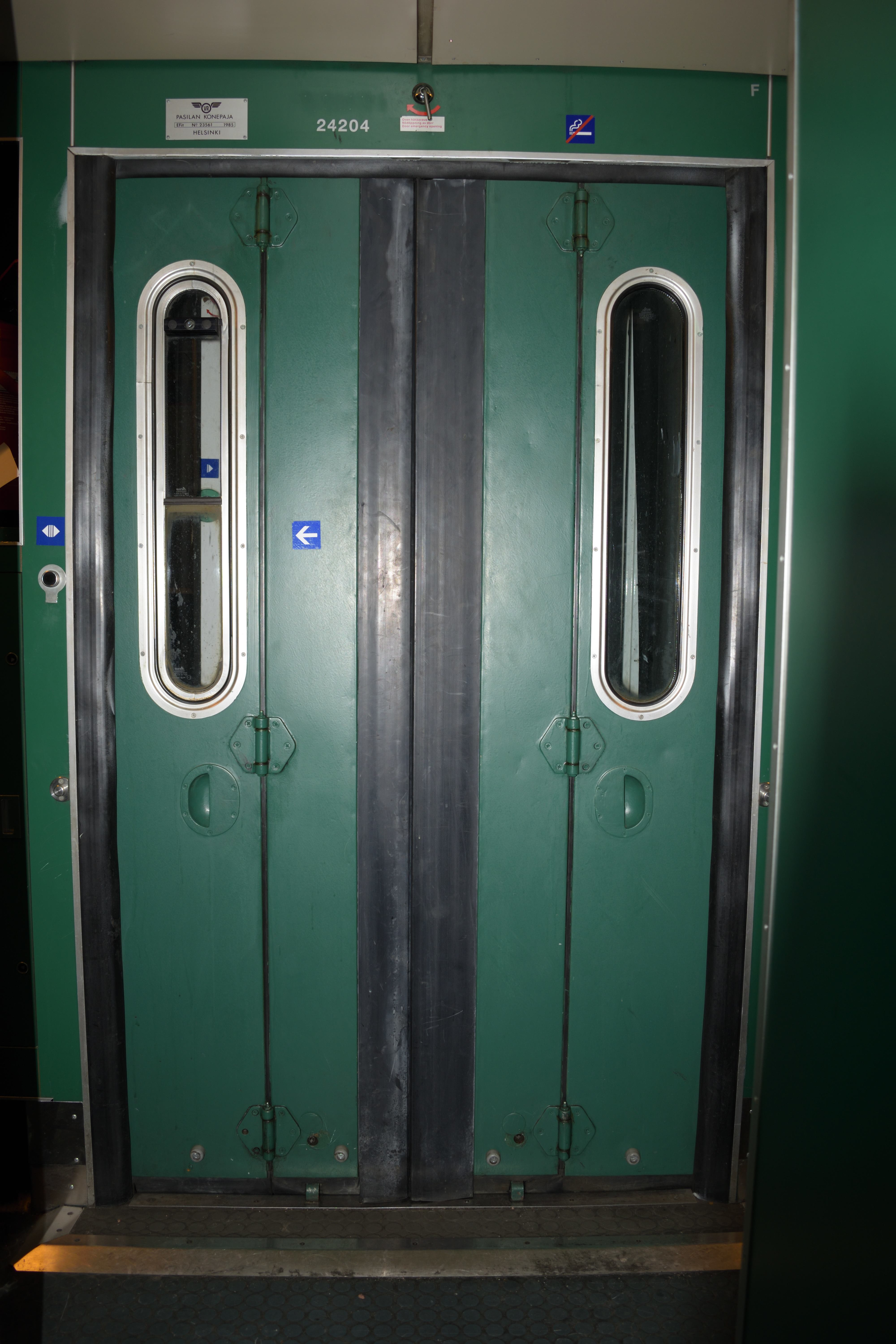
Most blue cars have big doors at the end of the cars that open using compressed air.

== See also ==
- VR Class Eil
