= VR Class Eil =

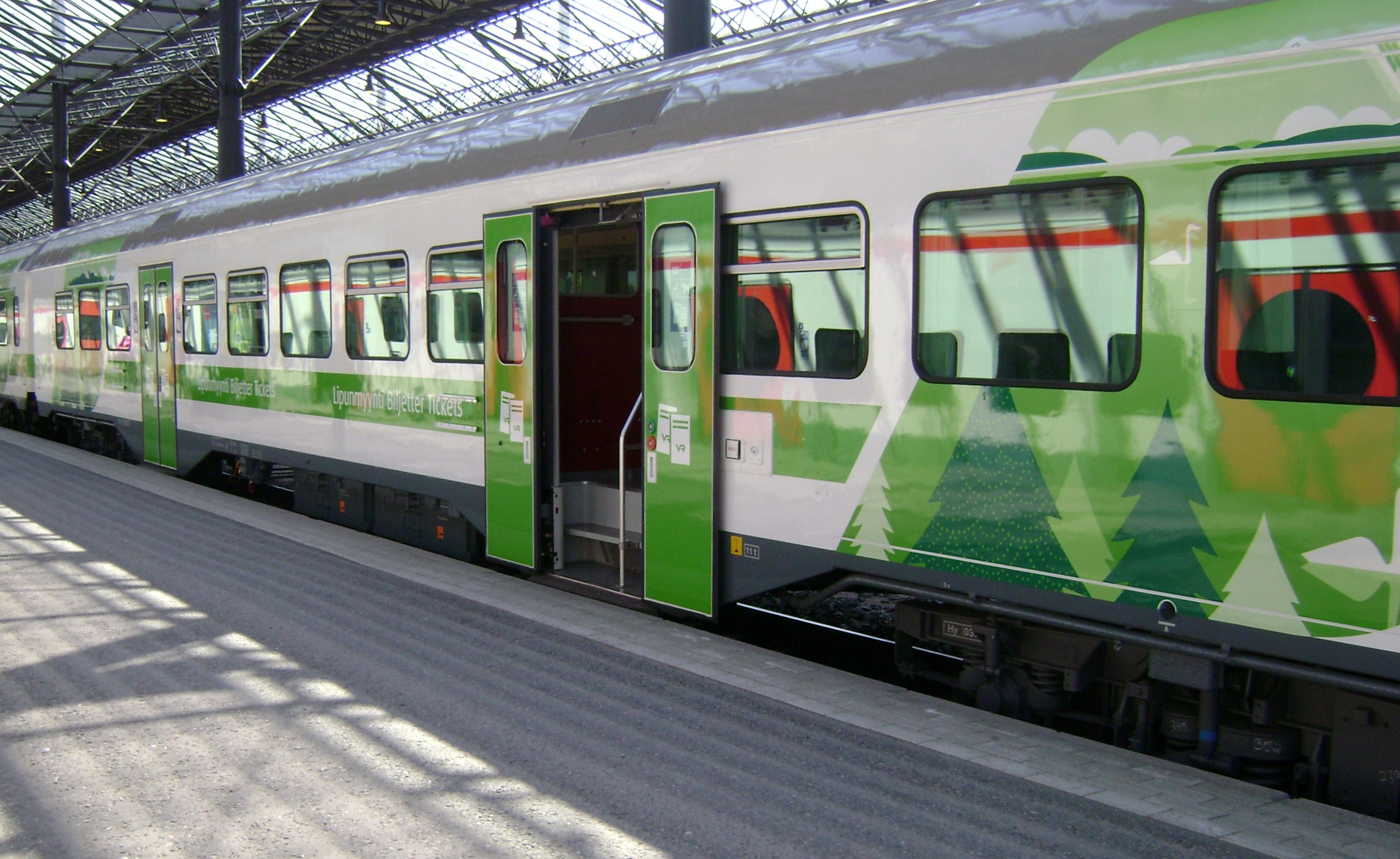
- A refurbished Eilf-car
- In service: 1982-2017, 2020-
- Built at: VR Pasilan Konepaja
- Constructed: 1982, 1986-1987
- Refurbished: 1997-2000, 2011-2013
- Number built: 57
- Number in service: 7
- Number preserved: 0
- Number scrapped: 8
- Operator: VR

Specifications
- Car length: 26.4 m (86 ft 7 in)
- Doors: 4
- Maximum speed: 160 km/h (99 mph)
- Bogies: Minden-Deutz
- Seating: 113
- Track gauge: 1,524 mm (5 ft)

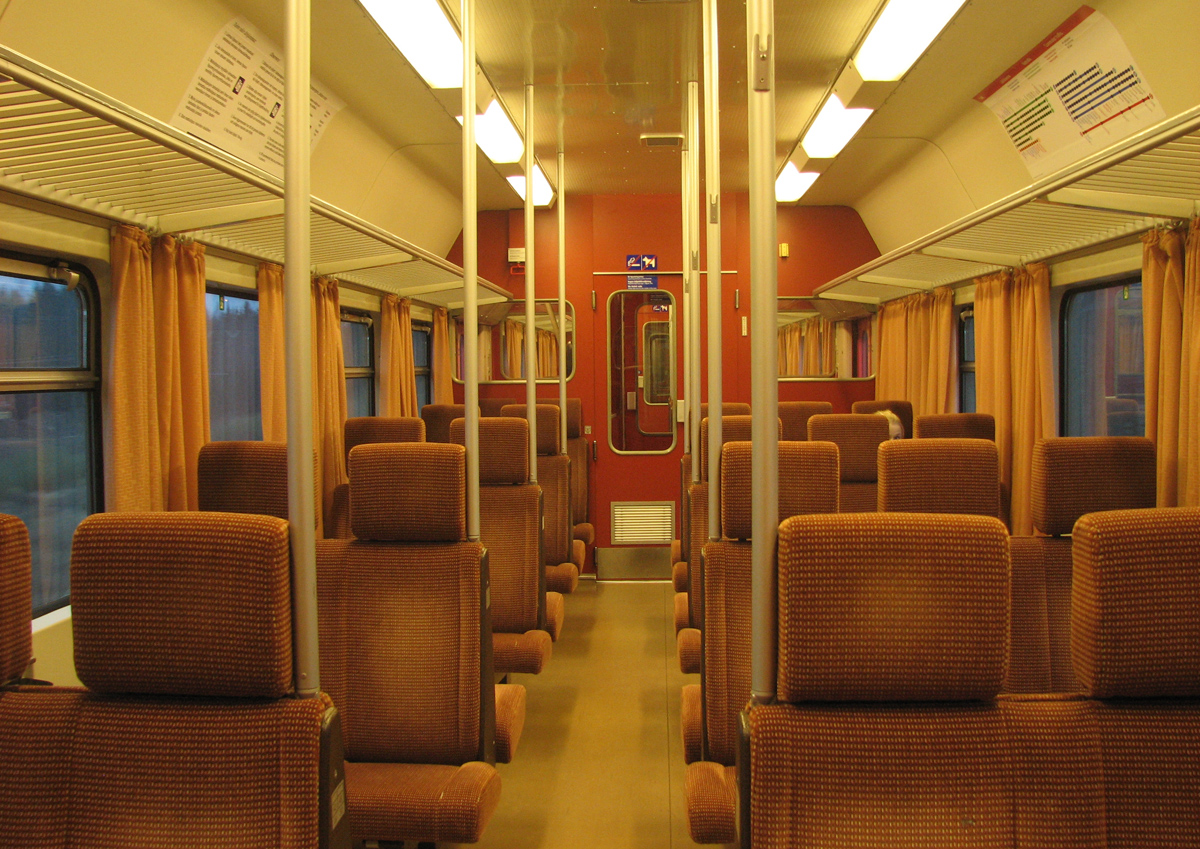
The inside of one of the cars.

Eil passenger cars are commuter cars that were used by VR Group on the Helsinki commuter rail from 1982 to 2017, and again from 2020.

In the 1980s new commuter rolling stock was needed. In the 60s and 70s new electric commuter trains were introduced, but there was still a need for individual cars that could be used with any locomotive and easily used in any configuration needed. Wooden commuter cars were still being used, but they were rapidly ageing and obsolete. Thus in 1982 new steel cars were introduced. They featured two pairs of automatic doors on each side.

In the 2010s, they underwent major renovations and refurbishment, which changed the seat color to green and the whole body of the car was painted white-green, according to VRs new color scheme. At the same time, new electric commuter trains were introduced which completely replaced the need for Eil-cars. They were used until the summer of 2017. Many of them lay abandoned around various trains yards in Finland. Some were brought back to use on trains between Helsinki and Kouvola from January 2020. Beginning in the autumn of 2020.They have been transported to the Iisalmi-Ylivieska railway to replace Diesel Dm12 services with locomotive hauled Eil service. Eil cars are being scrapped at a rapid pace.

Class Eilf, a variant of the Eil car with a conductor's cabin, was also built around the same time.
