= Traidor, inconfeso y mártir =

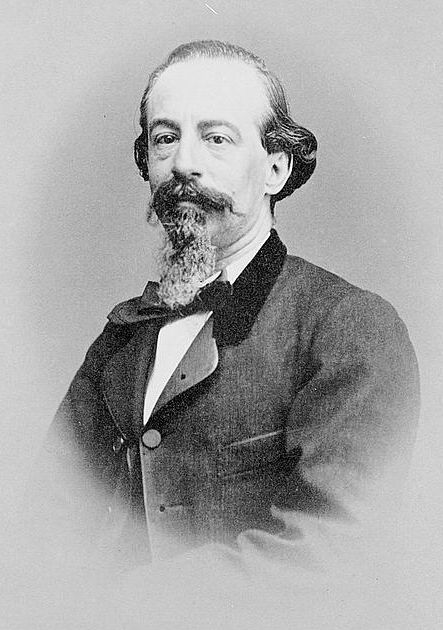
José Zorrilla, author of Traidor, inconfeso y mártir

Traidor, inconfeso y mártir (English: Treacherous, Unconfessed, and Martyr) is an 1849 Spanish three-act play by José Zorrilla, who also wrote Don Juan Tenorio. It is a historical drama in the Spanish Romantic style and is loosely based on a historical incident in which a Spanish baker, Gabriel de Espinosa, was prosecuted as an imposter for the missing King Sebastian of Portugal.

The play's setting is less elaborate than that of many other plays written during the Romantic period, primarily because the author was interested in the character development of the protagonist Gabriel Espinoza.

== Setting ==
The play is set in Medina del Campo, a town in the Spanish province of Valladolid, and revolves around Gabriel Espinosa, an acclaimed pastry chef from the town of Madrigal.

== Synopsis ==
The play centers around the enigmatic personality of Gabriel Espinoza, who claims to be a pastry chef in Madrigal, but is suspected to be King Sebastian of Portugal. Espinoza is staying at an inn in Burgos with his daughter, Aurora. César, captain of the Third of Flanders, declares his chaste love to Aurora. She rejects him as a galán ("ladies' man"), but offers her friendship. César does not believe that Espinoza is Aurora's father. Jealous of Espinoza, he tells the latter that he has been following him and Aurora from Madrigal by order of King Philip II of Spain.

King Philip II accuses Espinoza of attempting to take the throne by impersonating the late Portuguese monarch, Sebastian of Portugal. Consequently, the mayor of Madrigal, Don Rodrigo de Santillana, arrests Espinoza. The mayor's son, César, who is in love with Aurora, helps Espinoza escape. However, Aurora is in love with her adoptive father and rejects César's advances. As a result of her refusal and rejection, César is enraged and orders the arrest of Espinoza and Aurora, imprisoning the two in Medina del Campo.

Espinoza is tortured so that he confesses to impersonating the Portuguese monarch but continues to claim to be an innocent baker. Meanwhile, the Marquis of Tavira in Portugal claims that Espinoza is, in fact, the King of Portugal. The Spanish monarch orders the mayor to hang Espinoza, ending his claim to the throne. The mayor releases Aurora but sends Espinoza, who insists that he is innocent, to the gallows. After Espinoza's death, a note is found that reveals that he was King Sebastian.

== Meaning of the title ==
The three adjectives that form the name of the play refer to King Sebastian of Portugal:

- Treacherous explains the situation of the Portuguese monarch, who resorts to a new identity to hide from justice, and becomes a traitor to Portugal.
- Unconfessed alludes to the interrogations suffered in Medina del Campo, where he denies, despite all the tortures, being the true king.
- Martyr because of his death defending his cause.
