= Gabriel de Espinosa =

Spanish impostor

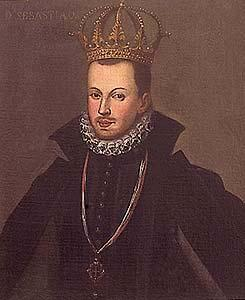
Portrait of Sebastian of Portugal, impersonated by Gabriel de Espinosa

Gabriel de Espinosa (died 1 August 1595 in Madrigal de las Altas Torres, Ávila), was a Spanish impostor. He was the protagonist of the incident known as the "baker of Madrigal", which consisted of the impersonation of the late King Sebastian of Portugal, for which he was executed.

== Background ==
After the disappearance of king Sebastian at Alcácer Quibir (1578), many efforts were made to ransom imprisoned Portuguese soldiers. Several soldiers returned to Portugal, which led many Portuguese to believe Sebastian had survived the battle and would return to claim his throne. This led to Sebastianism: the belief that Sebastian could return at any moment. Sebastian did not have descendants and thus eventually the throne went to his uncle Philip II of Spain, losing Portugal its independence.

== People involved ==
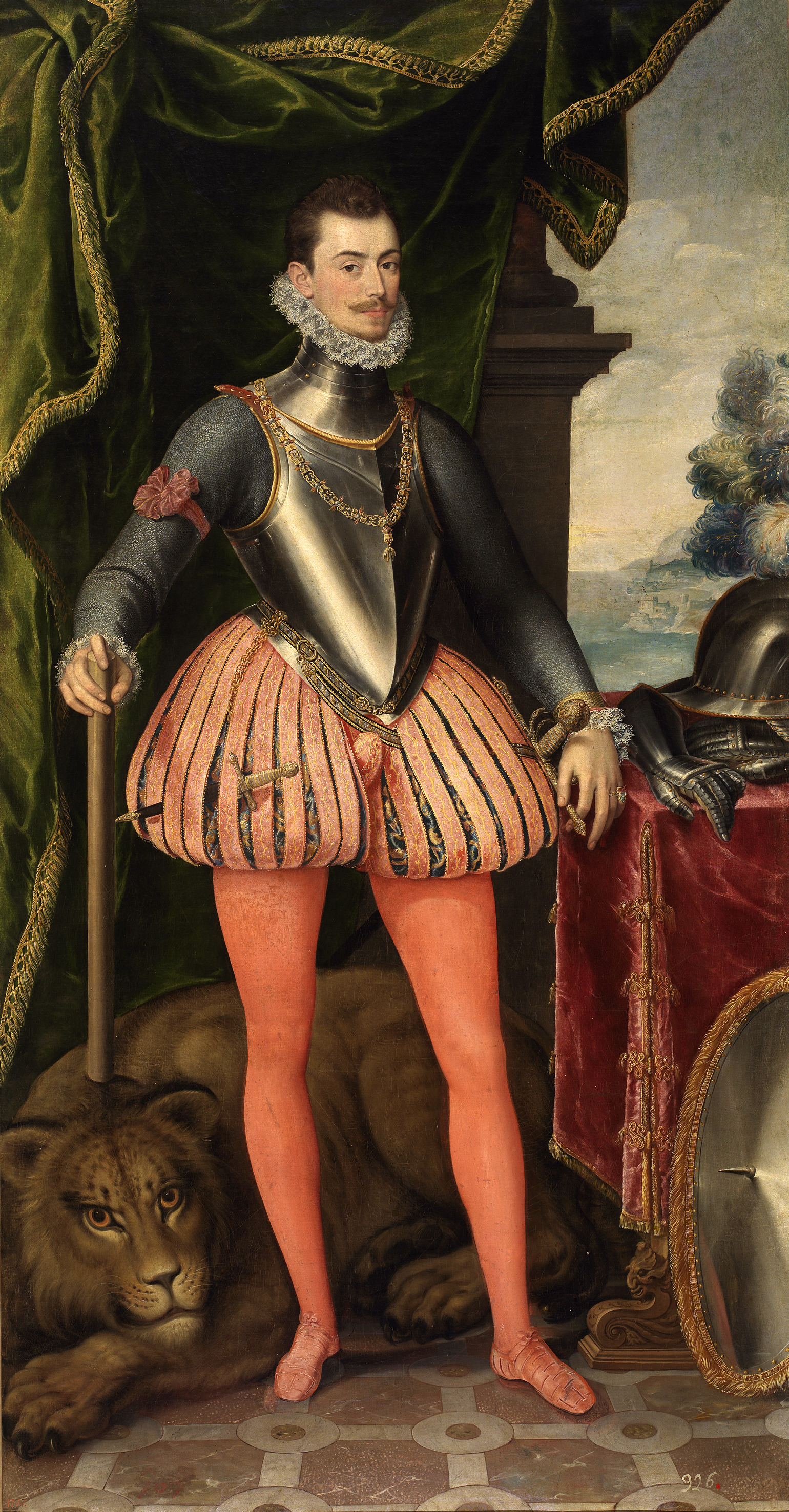
John of Austria, father of María Ana de Austria

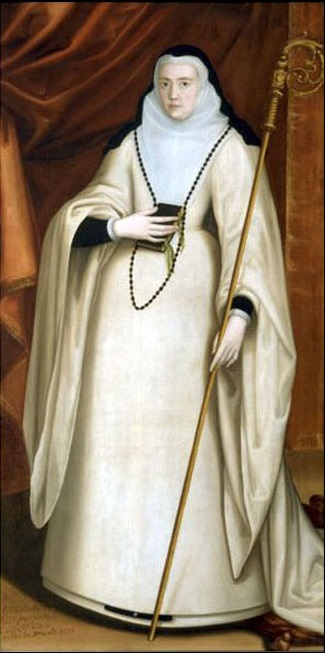
María Ana de Austria

Very little is known of Espinosa's early years. Some scholars believe that he was probably born in Toledo as this town had he oldest document known about him, his title of baker, but in Madrigal it is believed that he was born there. What is known is that in 1594 he arrived at Madrigal alongside his two-year-old daughter, Clara, and his wife, Isabel Cid. People noticed that the new baker spoke several languages (at least, French and German), knew how to ride a horse and, in general, appeared to be more than a humble officer. Although it is not impossible that he had learned these skills working for the militia of Captain Pedro Bermúdez, where he served.

In the same town lived Friar Miguel de los Santos, the possible thinker of the scam, who had been a confessor in the court of King Sebastian, and had supported the Prior of Crato in his intention to succeed said king. For that reason he had been exiled from Portugal and sent to Castile by Philip II.

The third person involved is María Ana de Austria, daughter of John of Austria. She entered the convent of Agustinas de Madrigal at the age of six, sent by his uncle Philip II. It seems that she had no religious vocation whatsoever, and that she preferred adventure stories, especially if they referred to her father or her cousin Sebastian, whom, like many others at the time, she believed alive.

== The plot ==
Probably Friar Miguel de los Santos noticed the physical resemblance between Espinosa and Sebastian (among other things, they were both redheads, something unusual in Portugal) and convinced Espinosa to impersonate the late king. De los Santos also introduced him to Ana de Austria. Either because she believed him to actually be her cousin or just because she wanted to escape the convent she agreed to promise in marriage with him until she could obtain permission from the Pope.

Espinosa was arrested in Valladolid for talking disrespectfully of the king and the jailers found on him 4 letters (two by Miguel de los Santos and two by Ana de Austria) talking about the plot. The matter was then referred to the royal court and both Miguel and Ana were also arrested.

== Process, conviction and death ==
Accused of crimes of lese majesty, both Espinosa and Miguel de los Santos were repeatedly interrogated, sometimes under torture. Espinosa made contradictory declarations during the process and he was sentenced to death by hanging on 1 August 1595. He remained calm and proud during the execution. After the hanging, Gabriel was decapitated and dismembered and his remains were exposed to the town in each one of the four gates of the wall. His head was exposed at the facade of the Town hall.

Miguel de los Santos was also hanged in Plaza Mayor, Madrid. He maintained that he believed Espinosa to be the king.

Philip II didn't take a lot of pity on his niece either. She was locked in strict closure in the convent of Our Lady of Grace, in Ávila. After the death of Philip II (1598) Philip III forgave her and allowed her to return to the convent of Madrigal of which she eventually became prior.

== In literature ==
The theme was used in some literary works of the 19th century, such as the play Traidor, inconfeso y mártir by José Zorrilla (1849) or the serial El cocinero de Su Majestad o El pastelero de Madrigal (1862) by Manuel Fernández y González.
