= Don Juan Tenorio =

Play written in 1844 by José Zorrilla

- Written by: José Zorilla
- Original language: Spanish
- Genre: Romance

Premiere
- Date premiered: 1844
- Place premiered: Spain

Don Juan Tenorio: Drama religioso-fantástico en dos partes (Don Juan Tenorio: Religious-Fantasy Drama in Two Parts) is a play written by José Zorrilla and produced in 1844. It is the most romantic of the two principal Spanish-language literary interpretations of the legend of Don Juan. The other is the 1630 El burlador de Sevilla y convidado de piedra (The Trickster of Seville and the Guest of Stone), which is attributed to Tirso de Molina. Don Juan Tenorio owes a great deal to this earlier version, as recognized by Zorrilla himself in 1880 in his Recuerdos del tiempo viejo (Memories of the Old Times), although the author confuses de Molina with another writer of the same era, Agustín Moreto.

== Plot ==
=== First part ===
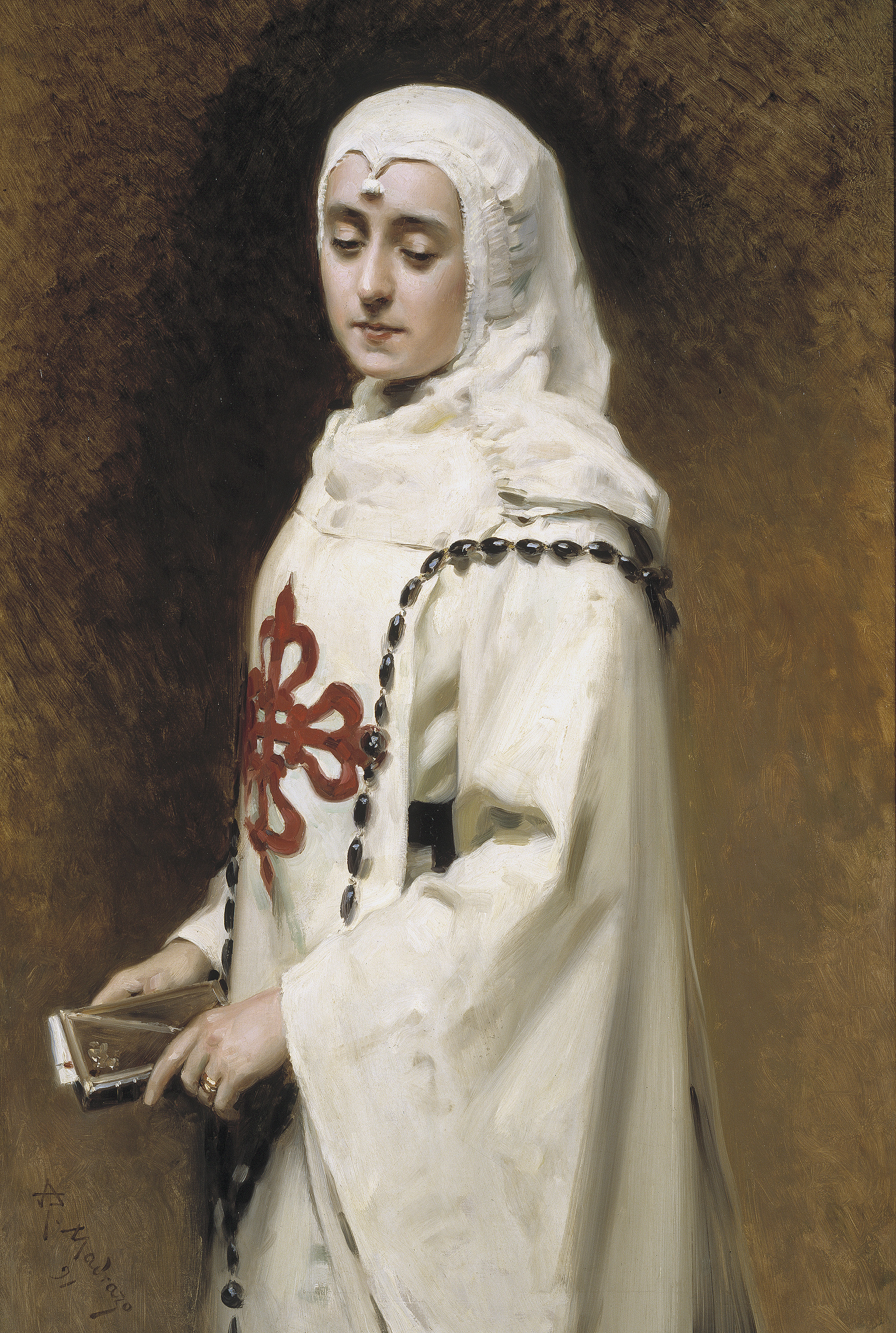
Raimundo Madrazo, María Guerrero in the role of Doña Inés, who has just found a love letter from Don Juan, hidden in the pages of a book.

In the first part of the drama, the protagonist is still the demonic rake described by de Molina (he is called a demon and even Satan himself on more than one occasion). The story begins with Don Juan meeting Don Luis in a crowded wine shop in Seville so that the two can find out which of them has won the bet that they made one year ago: each expected himself to be able to conquer more women and kill more men than the other. Naturally, Don Juan wins on both counts. People in the crowd ask him if he is not afraid that someday there will be consequences for his actions, but Don Juan replies that he only thinks about the present.

It is then revealed that both caballeros have gotten engaged since they last met, Don Luis to Doña Ana de Pantoja and Don Juan to Doña Inés de Ulloa. Don Luis, his pride hurt, admits that Don Juan has slept with every woman on the social ladder from princess to pauper, but is lacking one conquest: a novice about to take her holy vows. Don Juan agrees to the new bet and doubles it by saying that he will seduce a novice and an engaged woman, boasting that he only needs six days to complete the task with Don Luis's fiancée as one of the intended conquests.

At this point, Don Gonzalo, Don Juan's future father-in-law, who has been sitting in a corner during this entire exchange, declares that Don Juan will never come near his daughter and the wedding is off. Don Juan laughs and tells the man that he will either give Doña Inés to him, or he will take her. He now has the second part of the bet concreted with Doña Inés set to take her vows.

In following scenes, Don Juan manages, through charisma, luck and bribery, to fulfill both terms of the bet in less than one night. However, he does not seduce the saintly Doña Inés; he just takes her from the convent where she had been cloistered and brings her to his mansion outside the city. There is a very tender love scene in which each professes to love the other, and it seems that, for once, Don Juan does feel something more than lust for Doña Inés.

Unfortunately, don Luis arrives to demand a duel with don Juan for having seduced doña Ana while pretending to be her fiance. Before they can fight, don Gonzalo shows up with the town guardsmen and accuses don Juan of kidnapping and seducing his daughter. Don Juan kneels and begs don Gonzalo to let him marry doña Inés, saying he worships her and would do anything for her. Don Luis and don Gonzalo mock him for his perceived cowardice and continue to demand his life. Don Juan declares that, since they have rejected him in his attempts to become a good person, he will go on being a devil, and he shoots don Gonzalo, stabs don Luis in a duel, and flees the country, abandoning the now fatherless doña Inés.

=== Second part ===
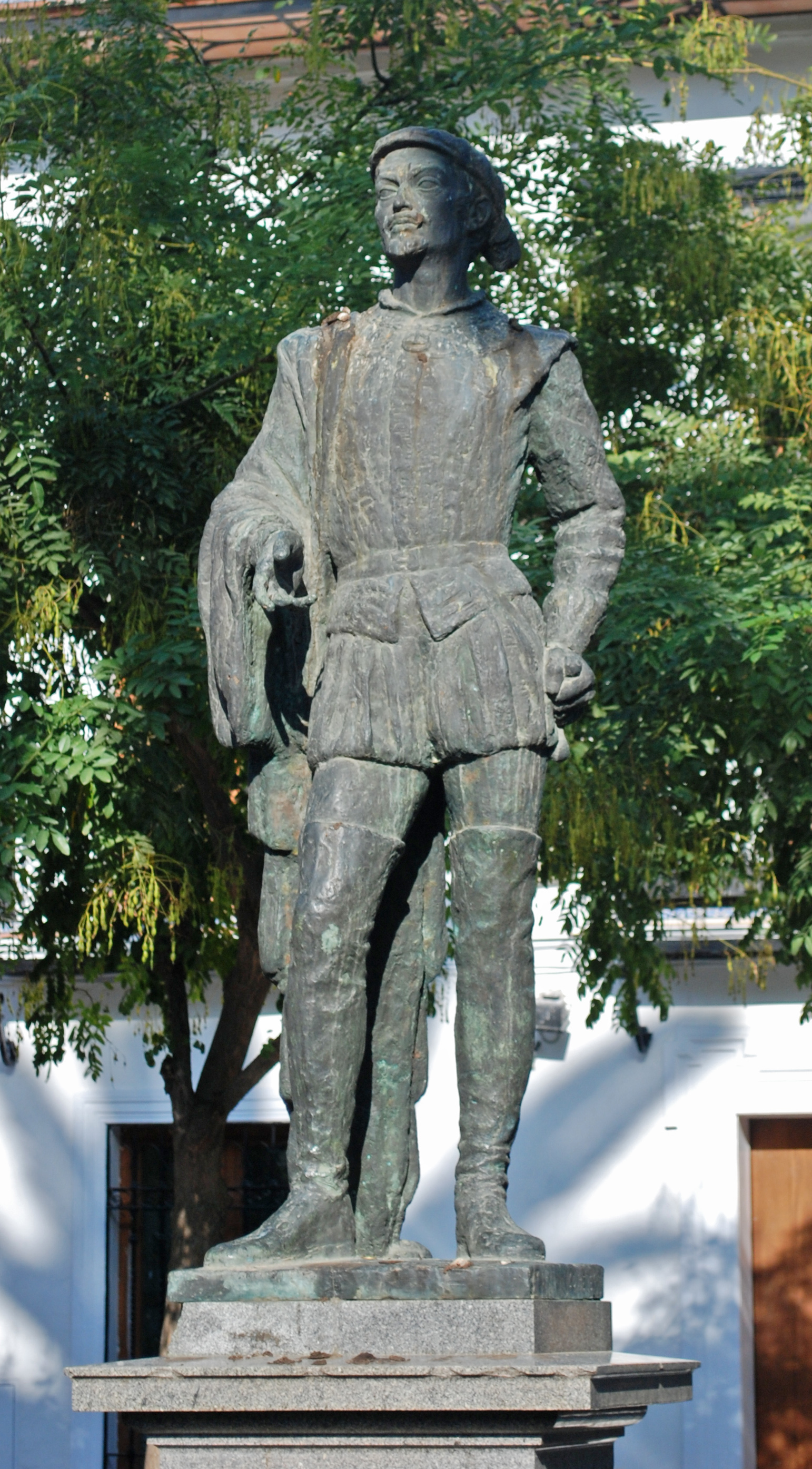
Statue of Don Juan in square of Refinadores in Seville.

The second part begins after 5 years have passed. Don Juan returns to Seville. Upon coming to the place where his father's mansion used to be which was turned into a pantheon, he discovers that the building was torn down and a cemetery built in its place. Lifelike statues of don Gonzalo, don Luis, and doña Inés stand over the tombs. The sculptor, who has just finished his work when don Juan arrives, tells him that don Diego Tenorio, don Juan's father, had disowned his son and used his inheritance to build this memorial to his victims. Don Juan also finds out that doña Inés died of sorrow not long after being abandoned.

The protagonist is clearly at least a bit repentant of what he has done, expressing regret to the statues and praying to doña Inés for forgiveness. As he prays, the statue of doña Inés comes to life and tells him that he only has one day to live, in which he must decide what his fate will be. Inés is speaking from Purgatory, having made a deal with God to offer her own blameless soul on behalf of don Juan's. God therefore agreed that their two souls would be bound together eternally, so don Juan must choose either salvation or damnation for both himself and doña Inés.

Then, two of don Juan's old friends, Centellas and Avellaneda, show up, and don Juan convinces himself that he hadn't truly seen a ghost at all. In order to prove his bravado, he heretically invites don Gonzalo's statue to dinner that evening. Don Juan goes on blaspheming against heaven and the dead throughout the following scenes, until don Gonzalo's statue really does show up at supper. Don Juan manages to remain largely nonchalant, although both of his other guests pass out, as don Gonzalo tells him once more that his time is running out.

When Avellaneda and Centellas wake up, don Juan accuses them of having contrived this show to make fun of him. Offended, they accuse him of having drugged their drinks to mock them, and they end up in a swordfight.

The third act of Part Two is difficult to describe definitely, in that various critics have interpreted it differently (see below). Don Juan is back in the cemetery, led there by Don Gonzalo's ghost. Don Gonzalo's tomb opens and reveals an hourglass that represents Don Juan's life. It has almost run out, and Don Gonzalo says that Centellas already killed don Juan in the duel. He then takes Don Juan's arm to lead him into Hell. Don Juan protests that he isn't dead and reaches out to heaven for mercy. Doña Inés appears and redeems him, and the two go to Heaven together.

== Interpretation ==
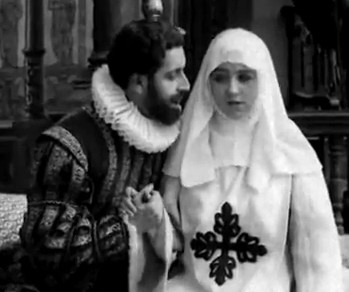
The actors Fortunio Bonanova and Inocencia Alcubierre in the film Don Juan Tenorio of Ricardo de Baños.

This don Juan shifts away from the moralistic theme of Tirso de Molina's play. This carefree character is much more conflicted than Molina's original and highlights the manner in which the values of the myth can be reinterpreted. Zorrilla's play (and don Juan's final repentance) is often understood as an assertion of the author's conservativism and Catholic faith.

It has become a tradition of both Spanish and Mexican theater to perform el Tenorio on All Saints Day or its Mexican equivalent the Day of the Dead, so the play has been performed at least once every year for over a century. It is also one of the most lucrative plays in Spanish history. Unfortunately, the author did not benefit from his play's success: not long after he finished writing it, Zorrilla sold the rights to the play, since he did not expect it to be much more successful than any of his other works. Aside from the price paid for the rights, Zorrilla never made any money from any of the productions. Later, he wrote biting criticisms of the work in an apparent attempt to get it discontinued long enough for him to revise it and market the second version himself. However, the ploy never succeeded. This is Ruiz's version of Don Juan, because he believed a story can never end sadly, and must always have a happy ending.

== List of characters ==
- Don Juan Tenorio (protagonist)
- Don Luis Mejía (don Juan's rival)
- Doña Inés de Ulloa (don Juan's fiancee) played by Inocencia Alcubierre in the 1922 production.
- Doña Ana de Pantoja (don Luis' fiancee)
- Don Gonzalo De Ulloa (doña Inés' father)
- Brígida (doña Inés' governess/servant)
- Captain Centellas (friend of don Juan)
- Don Rafael de Avellaneda (friend of don Luis and, later, don Juan)
- Don Diego Tenorio (don Juan's father)
- Marcos Ciutti (don Juan's servant)
- Christófano Buttarelli (owner of the shop in which the first scenes take place)
- Pascual (servant of the Pantoja family)
- Lucía (doña Ana's maid)
- The Abbess of the convent in which doña Inés lives
- The sculptor that makes the statues from Part 2
- Town guardsmen

== English versions/translations of the play ==
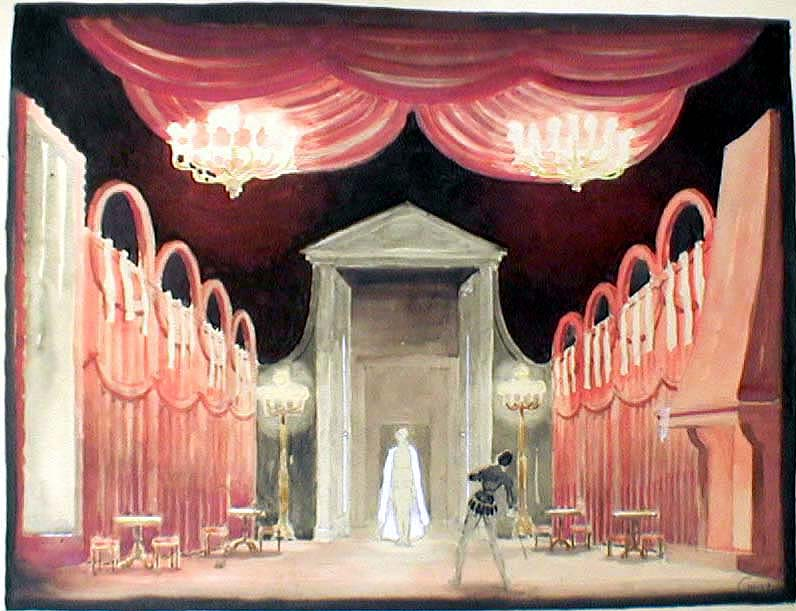
Don Juan 2.

- 2021. Arbesu, David. Don Juan Tenorio: A Religious-Fantasy Drama in Two Parts. Newark, DE: Juan de la Cuesta Hispanic Monographs.
- 2003. Trimble, Robert G. A Translation of José Zorrilla’s Don Juan Tenorio. Lewiston, NY: Edwin Mellen Press.
- 2002. Mayberry, Nancy K., A. S. Kline. Don Juan Tenorio: A New English Verse Translation with Parallel Spanish Text. Don Juan Tenorio from Project Gutenberg in Spanish with English translation.
- 1990. Bolt, Ranjit. The Real Don Juan. Bath, England: Absolute Press.
- 1963. Oliver, William. “Don Juan Tenorio.” The Theatre of Don Juan: A Collection of Plays and Views, 1630-1963. Lincoln, NE: University of Nebraska Press. 469-538.
- 1844. Owen, Walter. Don Juan Tenorio: Adapted from the Spanish and Rendered into English Verse by Walter Owen. Buenos Aires: Lamb.
