= Catalina de Balmaseda y San Martín =

Spanish Discalced Carmelite (1544–1594)

Catalina of Christ OCD
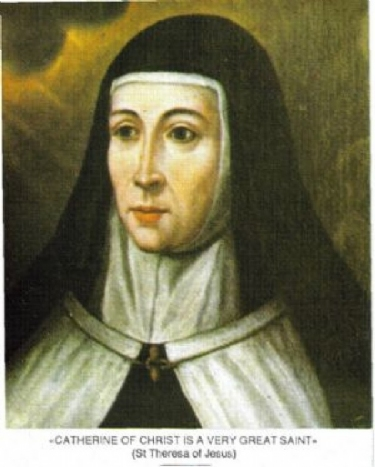
- Born: 28 October 1544; Madrigal de las Altas Torres, Ávila, Spain
- Died: 3 January 1594 (aged 49); Barcelona, Spain

Catalina de Balmaseda y San Martín, religious name Catalina de Cristo, (1544-1594) was a Carmelite nun and associate of Teresa of Ávila.

== Life ==
She was born into a noble family in Madrigal de las Altas Torres, being the third of four siblings, She was the daughter of Cristóbal de Balmaseda, a relative of Saint Teresa of Jesus Juana Bustamante. As a child Catalina was known for her piety and love for solitude, prayer and giving alms to the poor. She very soon made the decision to keep her virginity. Her parents did not teach her to read as they felt that would keep her innocent and away from heresy. This ultimately became an impediment to her as a nun and the order taught her reading before she became a prioress.

During this period she spent a brief time in Murcia on some of her father's business. Upon her return she became seriously ill and spent 9 months in bed barely able to move. She made a promise to the Virgin Mary to keep a vigil in the church of Santa María del Castillo if she cured her, which happened.

During a preaching in Madrigal de las Altas Torres by the Franciscan Alonso Lobo she managed to communicate with him in writing, confirming to the religious that the spiritual path she had chosen was good and safe. Her first wish was to become a hermit. But on in July 1568 she met Saint Teresa of Jesus who passed through Madrigal de las Altas Torres on her way to the convent of Medina del Campo. Although Catalina tried to speak privately with Saint Teresa, her sister prevented her from doing so.

In October 1571, her sister died from the plague that hit the region that year; Catalina was thus free to become a nun. She asked Teresa of Jesus to be admitted to the convent of Medina del Campo, agreeing on 10 July 1572. She completed the novitiate and made her perpetual vows on 5 August 1573.

In 1581 Catalina helped Saint Teresa found the convent of Soria. On 15 June that year, the saint named her prioress of the new foundation. On 8 December 1583, Catalina founded the Carmel of Pamplona, carrying out her mission accompanied by five professed nuns and a novice, Francisca of the Blessed Sacrament. During her stay in this city she was affected by various illnesses.

In 1588 he left Pamplona for a new foundation in Barcelona. On the way he stopped in Zaragoza, where he visited the city's churches, especially the Basilica del Pilar. She arrived in Barcelona on 14 June, serving as prioress until her death.

She was the prioress in Barcelona when she died in 1594. Her body is said to be incorrupt.
