= José Zorrilla =

Spanish poet, writer, playwright (1817–1893)

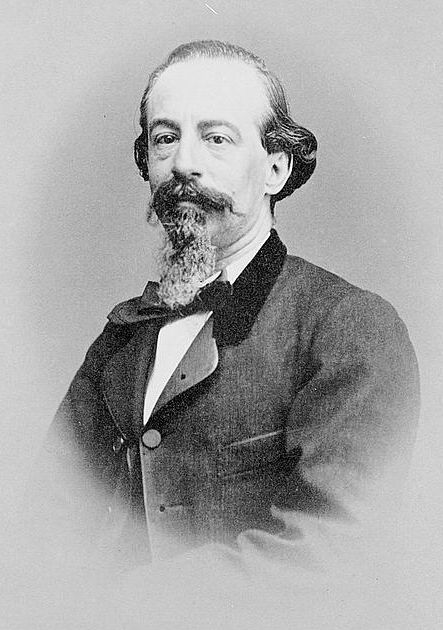
- Born: José Zorrilla y Moral; 21 February 1817; Valladolid, Spain
- Died: 23 January 1893 (aged 75); Madrid, Spain
- Occupations: Poet, playwright
- Spouse(s): Florentina O’Reilly, Juana Pacheco
- Writing career
- Language: Spanish
- Notable work: Don Juan Tenorio
- Movement: Romanticism

Seat L of the Real Academia Española
- In office 31 May 1885 – 23 January 1893
- Preceded by: José Caveda y Nava
- Succeeded by: Zeferino González y Díaz Tuñón (Note: González was elected for the position in 1893 but never took the seat)

José Zorrilla y Moral (Spanish pronunciation: [xoˈse θoˈriʎa]) was a Spanish poet and dramatist, who became National Laureate.

== Biography ==
Zorrilla was born in Valladolid to a magistrate in whom Ferdinand VII placed special confidence. He was educated by the Jesuits at the Real Seminario de Nobles in Madrid, wrote verses when he was twelve, became an enthusiastic admirer of Walter Scott and Chateaubriand, and took part in the school performances of plays by Lope de Vega and Calderón de la Barca.

In 1833, he was sent to study law at the university of Toledo, but after a year of idleness, he fled to Madrid, where he horrified the friends of his absolutist father by making violent speeches and by founding a newspaper that promptly was suppressed by the government. He narrowly escaped transportation to the Philippines, and spent the next few years in poverty.

The death of the satirist Mariano José de Larra brought Zorrilla into notice. His elegiac poem, read at Larra's funeral in February 1837, introduced him to the leading men of letters. In 1837 he published a book of verses, mostly imitations of Alphonse de Lamartine and Victor Hugo, which was so favourably received that he printed six more volumes within three years.

After collaborating with Antonio García Gutiérrez on the play Juán Dondolo (1839), Zorrilla began his individual career as a dramatist with Cada cual con su razón (1840), and during the next five years he wrote 22 plays, many of them extremely successful. His Cantos del trovador (1841), a collection of national legends written in verse, made Zorilla second only to José de Espronceda in popular esteem.

National legends also supply the themes of his dramas, which Zorilla often constructed by adapting older plays that had fallen out of fashion. For example, in El Zapatero y el Rey he recasts El montanés Juan Pascual by Juan de la Hoz y Mota; in La mejor Talon la espada he borrows from Agustín Moreto y Cavana's Travesuras del estudiante Pa-atoja. His famous play Don Juan Tenorio is a combination of elements from Tirso de Molina's Burlador de Sevilla and from Alexandre Dumas, père's Don Juan de Marana (which itself derives from Les Âmes du purgatoire by Prosper Mérimée). However, plays like Sancho García, El Rey loco, and El Alcalde Ronquillo are much more original. He considered his last play, Traidor, inconfeso y mártir (1845), to be his best play.

Upon the death of his mother in 1847, Zorrilla left Spain. He resided for a while at Bordeaux, and settled in Paris, where his incomplete poem Granada was published in 1852. In a fit of depression, he emigrated to America three years later, hoping, he claimed, that yellow fever or smallpox would kill him. During eleven years in Mexico he wrote very little. He returned to Spain in 1866, to find himself half-forgotten and considered old-fashioned.

Friends helped Zorilla obtain a small post, but the republican minister later abolished it. He was always poor, especially for the 12 years after 1871. The publication of his autobiography, Recuerdos del tiempo viejo in 1880, did nothing to alleviate his poverty. Though his plays were still being performed, he received no money from them.

Finally, in his old age, critics began to reappraise his work, and brought him new fame. He received a pension of 30,000 reales, a gold medal of honor from the Spanish Academy, and, in 1889, the title of National Laureate. He died in Madrid on 23 January 1893.

In his early years, Zorrilla was known as an extraordinarily fast writer. He claimed he wrote El Caballo del Rey Don Sancho in three weeks, and that he put together El Puñal del Godo in two days. This may account for some of the technical faults—redundancy and verbosity—in his works. His plays often appeal to Spanish patriotic pride, and actors and audiences have enjoyed his effective dramaturgy. Don Juan Tenorio is his best-known work.

== Works ==
=== Plays ===
- Vivir loco y morir más, 1837
- Juan Dándolo, 1839
- Más vale llegar a tiempo que rondar un año, 1839
- Ganar perdiendo, 1839
- Cada cual con su razón, 1839
- Lealtad de una mujer y aventuras de una noche, 1839
- El zapatero y el rey, primera parte, drama en cuatro actos, 1840; segunda parte, 1841
- El eco del torrente, 1842
- Los dos virreyes, 1842
- Un año y un día, 1842
- Sancho García, Composición trágica en tres actos, 1842
- Caín pirata. Cuadro de introducción al drama en tres actos titulado Un año y un día, 1842
- El puñal del godo, 1843
- Sofronia, tragedia en un acto a la manera clásica, 1843
- La mejor razón, la espada, 1843
- El molino de Guadalajara, 1843
- La oliva y el laurel. Alegoría escrita para las fiestas de la proclamación de Su Majestad la Reina doña Isabel II de España, 1843
- Don Juan Tenorio. Drama religioso-fantástico, 1844
- La copa de marfil, 1844
- El alcalde Ronquillo, 1845
- El rey loco. Drama en tres actos, 1846
- La reina y los favoritos, 1846
- La calentura, 1847 (segunda parte de El puñal del godo)
- El excomulgado, drama en tres actos, 1848
- La Creación y El Diluvio Universal. Espectáculo teatral en cuatro actos, divididos en seis partes, 1848
- Traidor, inconfeso y mártir, 1849
- El caballo del rey Don Sancho. Comedia en cuatro jornadas y en verso, 1850

=== Poetry ===
- Poesías, I, Madrid: J. Sancha, 1837
- Poesías, II, Madrid: José María Repullés, 1838
- Poesías, III, Madrid: José María Repullés, 1838
- Poesías, IV, Madrid: José María Repullés, 1839
- Poesías, V, Madrid: José María Repullés, 1839
- Poesías, VI, Madrid: José María Repullés, 1839
- Poesías, VII, Madrid: José María Repullés, 1840
- Vigilias del estío. Madrid: Boix, 1842
- Recuerdos y fantasías. Madrid: J. Repullés, 1844
- Cuentos de un loco, 1853
- La flor de los recuerdos. Ofrenda que hace a los pueblos hispano-americanos, 1855
- Dos rosas y dos rosales, 1859
- Granada mía!, 1885
