= Inocencia Alcubierre =

Spanish actress (1901–1927)

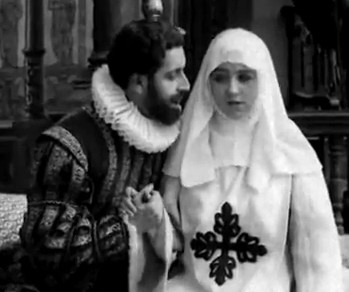
- The actors Fortunio Bonanova and Inocencia Alcubierre in a scene from Don Juan Tenorio
- Born: Inocencia Alcubierre Rodríguez; 16 June 1901; Uncastillo, Aragon, Spain
- Died: 12 August 1927 (aged 26); Madrid, Spain
- Other name: Ino Alcubierre
- Occupation: Actress

Inocencia Alcubierre Rodríguez, also known as Ino Alcubierre (16 June 1901 – 12 August 1927), was a Spanish actress.

== Biography ==
Alcubierre was born in Uncastillo in 1901 and moved to Barcelona during her childhood with her parents. As a teenager, she worked as an usher in a movie theater.

In 1921, she received the lead role in her first film, a western called Lilian. She acted for director Ricardo de Baños as Doña Inés in the production of Don Juan Tenorio in 1922. Alcubierre took a three-year hiatus to care for her baby daughter. After appearing in the minor film El niño de oro in 1925, she appeared in Nobleza baturra the same year, which went on to become one of the most successful silent films in Spain; however, no copy of the film survived. Her performance as María del Pilar, a "representation of the pain and heart heat", was praised. In 1926, she played a role in La malcasada, which discussed the then-controversial subject of divorce.

Alcubierre died in a traffic accident in Madrid at the age of 26.

== Filmography ==
- 1921: Lilian
- 1922: Don Juan tenorio
- 1925: El niño de oro
- 1925: Nobleza baturra
- 1926: La malcasada
