= Sebastian, King of Portugal =

King of Portugal from 1557 to 1578

Sebastian
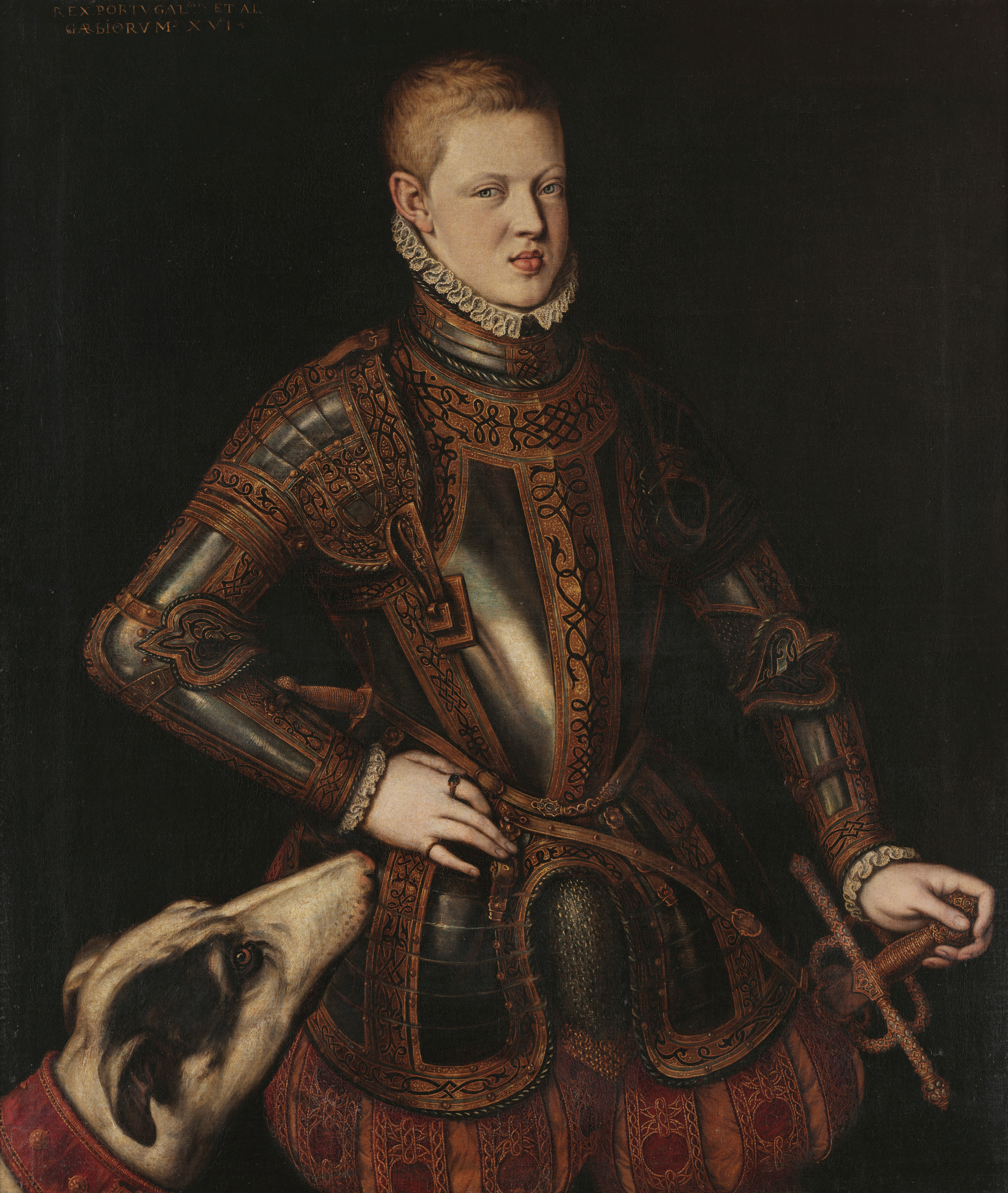
- Portrait, c. 1571–1574

King of Portugal
- Reign: 11 June 1557 – 4 August 1578
- Coronation: 16 June 1557
- Predecessor: John III
- Successor: Henry
- Regents: Catherine of Austria (1557–1562); Henry of Portugal (1562–1568)
- Born: 20 January 1554; Ribeira Palace, Lisbon, Portugal
- Disappeared: 4 August 1578 (aged 24); Ksar el-Kebir, Saadi Sultanate
- House: Aviz
- Father: João Manuel, Hereditary Prince of Portugal
- Mother: Joanna of Austria
- Religion: Roman Catholicism

Sebastian (Portuguese: Sebastião I [sɨβɐʃˈti.ɐ̃w]; 20 January 1554 – 4 August 1578) was King of Portugal from 11 June 1557 to 4 August 1578 and the penultimate Portuguese monarch of the House of Aviz.

He was the only child of João Manuel, Prince of Portugal, and Joanna of Austria. He was the grandson of King John III of Portugal and Catherine of Austria, Queen of Portugal. He disappeared (presumably killed in action) in the battle of Alcácer Quibir, against the Saadi Sultanate of Morocco. Sebastian I is often referred to as the Desired (Portuguese: o Desejado) or the Hidden (o Encoberto), as the Portuguese people longed for his return to end the decline of Portugal that began after his death. He is considered to be the Portuguese example of the king asleep in the mountain legend as Portuguese tradition states his return, in a foggy dawn, in Portugal's greatest hour of need.

== Early life ==
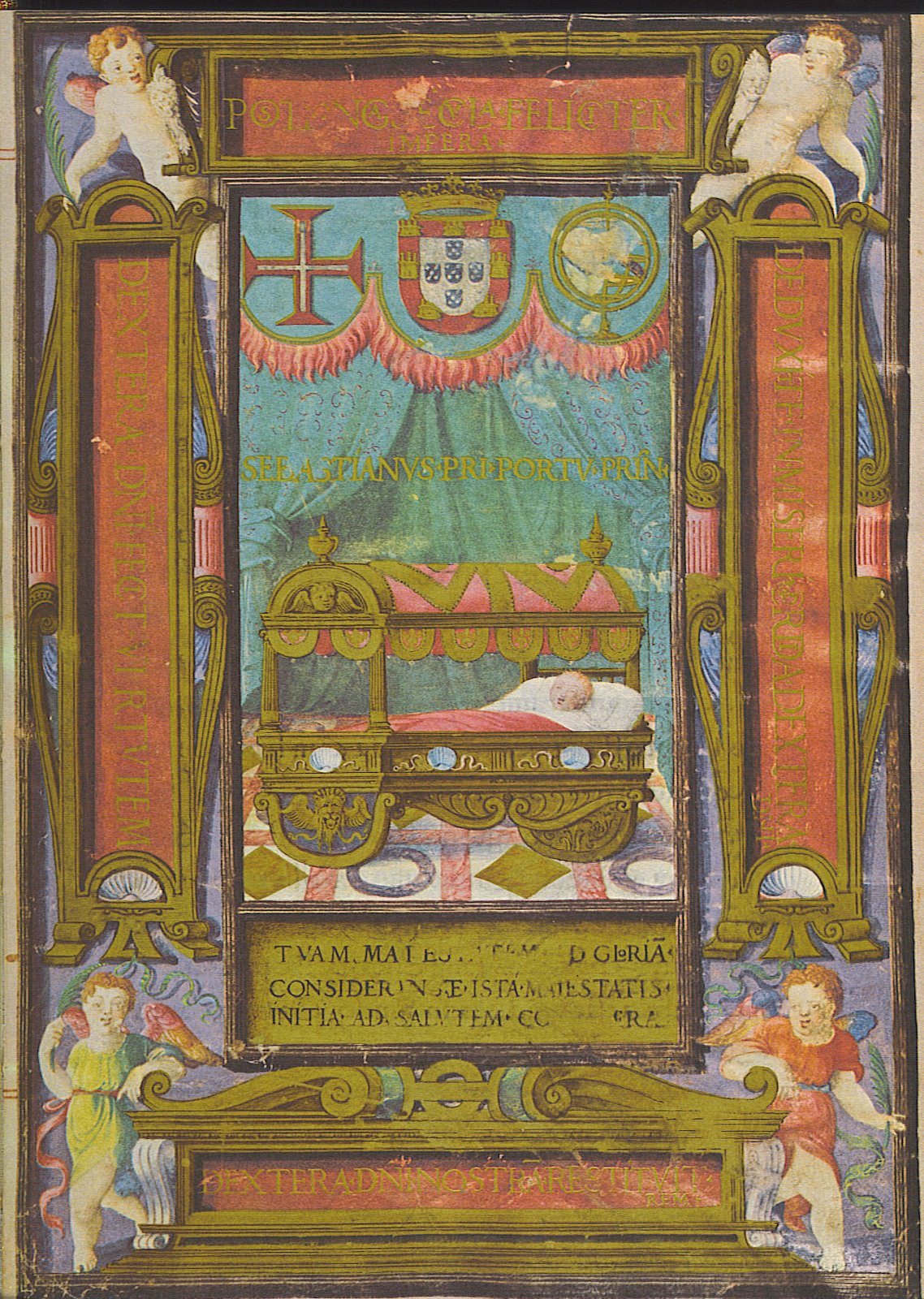
Sebastian as a newborn in Sentenças para a Ensinança e Doutrina do Príncipe, 1554.

Sebastian was born shortly after eight in the morning of 20 January 1554 (the feast of Saint Sebastian), and he was given the saint's name in commemoration. The name Sebastian was highly unusual for members of any European royal family at the time.

=== Accession as a minor ===
Sebastian was born heir apparent to the throne of Portugal, since his birth occurred two weeks after the death of his father. Soon after his birth, his mother Joanna of Spain left her infant son to serve as regent of Spain for her father, Emperor Charles V. After his abdication in 1556, she served in the same capacity for her brother Philip II of Spain. Joanna remained in Spain until her death in 1573, never to see her son again.

Sebastian succeeded to the throne at the age of three, on the death of his paternal grandfather King John III. Since he was still a child, a regency was necessary. It was handled first by his paternal grandmother, Catherine of Austria, and then by his great-uncle, Cardinal Henry of Évora. This period saw the continued Portuguese colonial expansion in Brazil, Angola, Mozambique, and Malacca, as well as the annexation of Macau in 1557.

Sebastian was a bright and lively boy. Contemporaries described him as fearless due to his great physical strength. Tall, slim, and blond, he was brought up by his grandmother Catherine. She was a domineering woman who exercised firm control over her grandson. Obedient as a child, he became obstinate and impulsive in later life.

=== Education ===
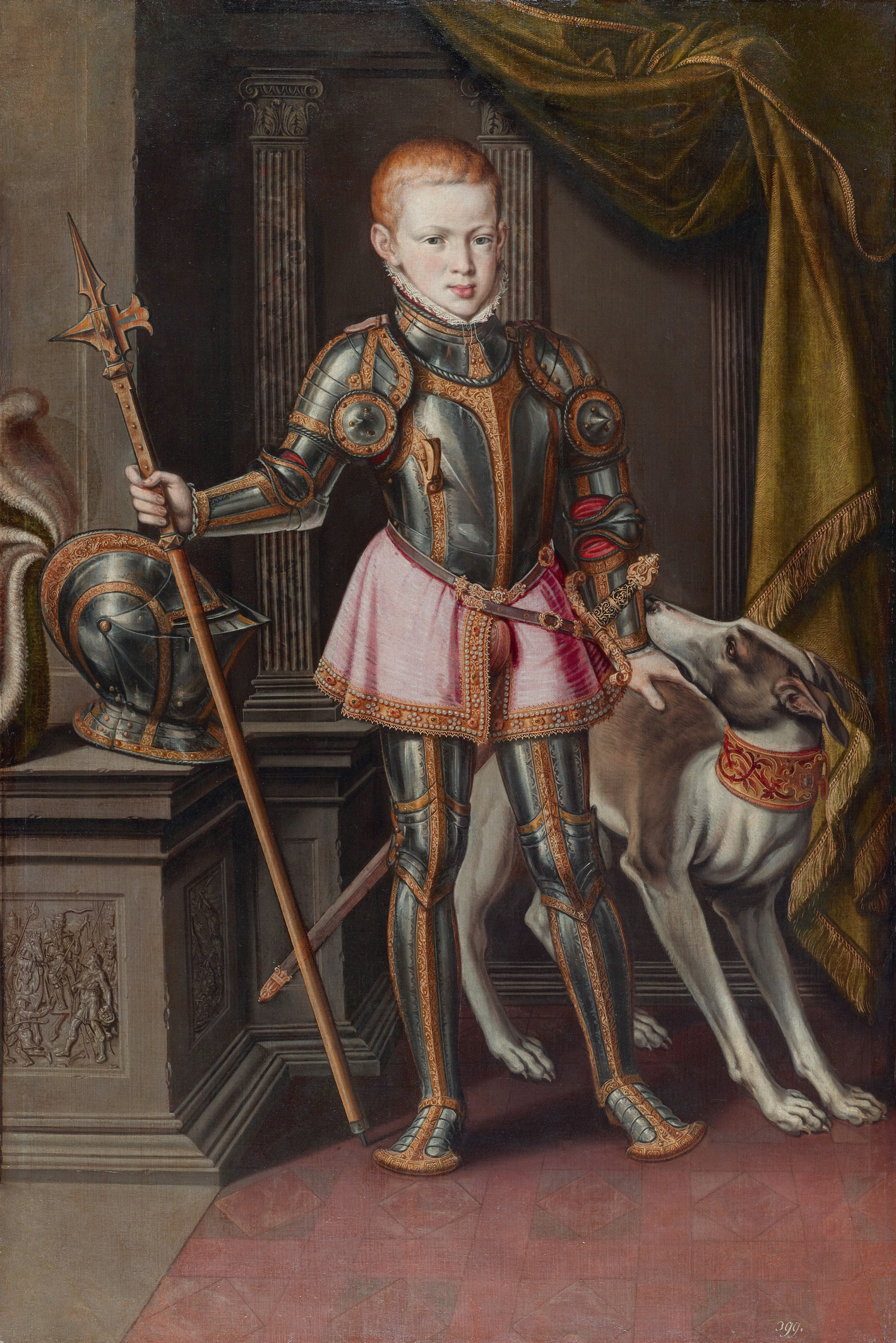
Portrait of Sebastian of Portugal; Alonso Sanches Coelho, 1562.

The young king grew up under the guidance and heavy influence of the Jesuits. Aleixo de Meneses, a military man of solid reputation and former tutor and guardian of Prince John, was appointed tutor to Sebastian. Other teachers included the priest Luís Gonçalves da Câmara and his assistant, the priest Amador Rebelo.

His upbringing made Sebastian extremely devout. He carried a copy of Thomas Aquinas on a belt at his waist and was constantly accompanied by two clerics of the Theatine Order who were intent on preserving the king's innocence. As a child, Sebastian reportedly would react to visitors by running off into hiding with the monks until the visitors had gone.

=== Marriage plans ===
Sebastian died young and did not marry. However, he was involved in some proposed marriage alliances. In particular, the Queen dowager of France, Catherine de' Medici, nurtured a plan for a long time to marry her youngest daughter, Margaret of Valois, to Sebastian, a plan which never came to fruition, likely due to Castilian interference, which had become pervasive at the Portuguese Court since the time of King Manuel I.

Sebastian himself, however, put an end to that plan, declaring that he was unimpressed by the mild suppression of the Huguenot Protestants in France, and that he would not bind himself to the House of Valois until he had seen how the situation would develop. Later, he agreed — being persuaded by emissaries of the Pope — to marry Margaret in order to prevent her from marrying the Huguenot Henry of Navarre; by that time, however, the French king and his mother were already intent on Margaret marrying Henry. Sebastian's proposal was rejected, and Margaret married Henry in 1572.

Sebastian was also offered his cousin Elisabeth of Austria, the daughter of Emperor Maximilian II (Maximilian was Charles V's nephew.). Sebastian himself made a proposal in 1577 to his first cousin Isabella Clara Eugenia, daughter of his maternal uncle Philip II of Spain.

== Later reign ==
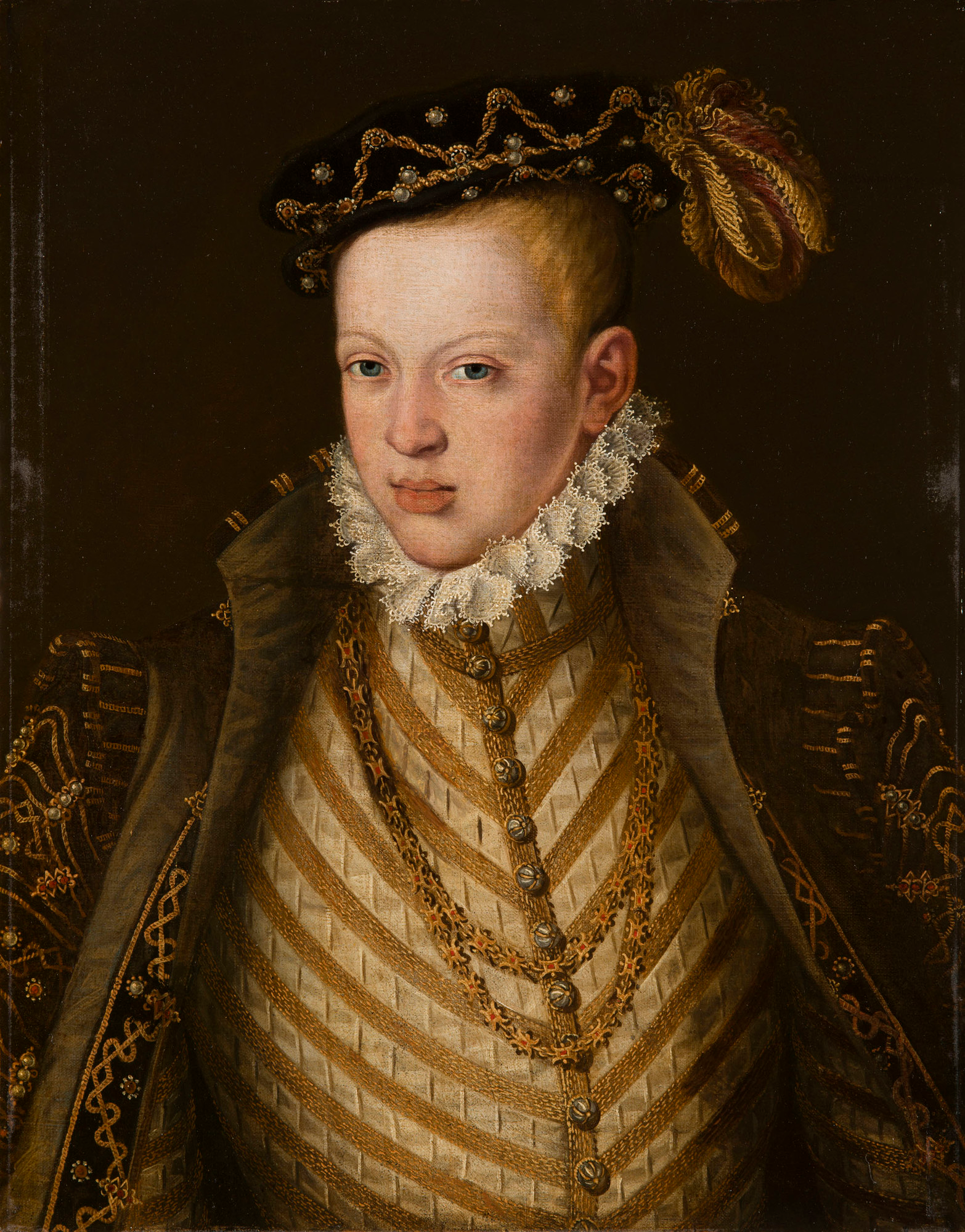
Portrait of Sebastian attributed to Cristóvão de Morais, c. 1565.

During Sebastian's short personal reign, he strengthened ties with the Holy Roman Empire, England and France through diplomatic efforts. He also restructured much of the administrative, judicial and military life in his kingdom. In 1568, Sebastian created scholarships to assist students who wished to study medicine or pharmacy at the University of Coimbra.

That same year he rewarded indigenous Brazilians in Brazil who helped in the fight against the French. The chief of the Temiminós Tribe, Arariboia, was given lands near the Bay of Guanabara. In 1569, Sebastian ordered Duarte Nunes de Leão to compile all the laws and legal documents of the kingdom in a collection of Leis Extravagantes known as the Código Sebastiânico (Sebastian's code).

During the great plague of Lisbon in 1569, Sebastian sent for doctors from Seville to help the Portuguese doctors fight the plague. He created two hospitals in Lisbon to take care of those afflicted with the disease.

In his concern for the widows and orphans of those killed by the plague, he created several Recolhimentos (shelters) known as the Recolhimento de Santa Marta (shelter of Santa Marta) and the Recolhimento dos Meninos (shelter of the children) and provided wet nurses to take care of the babies.

=== Legal reforms ===
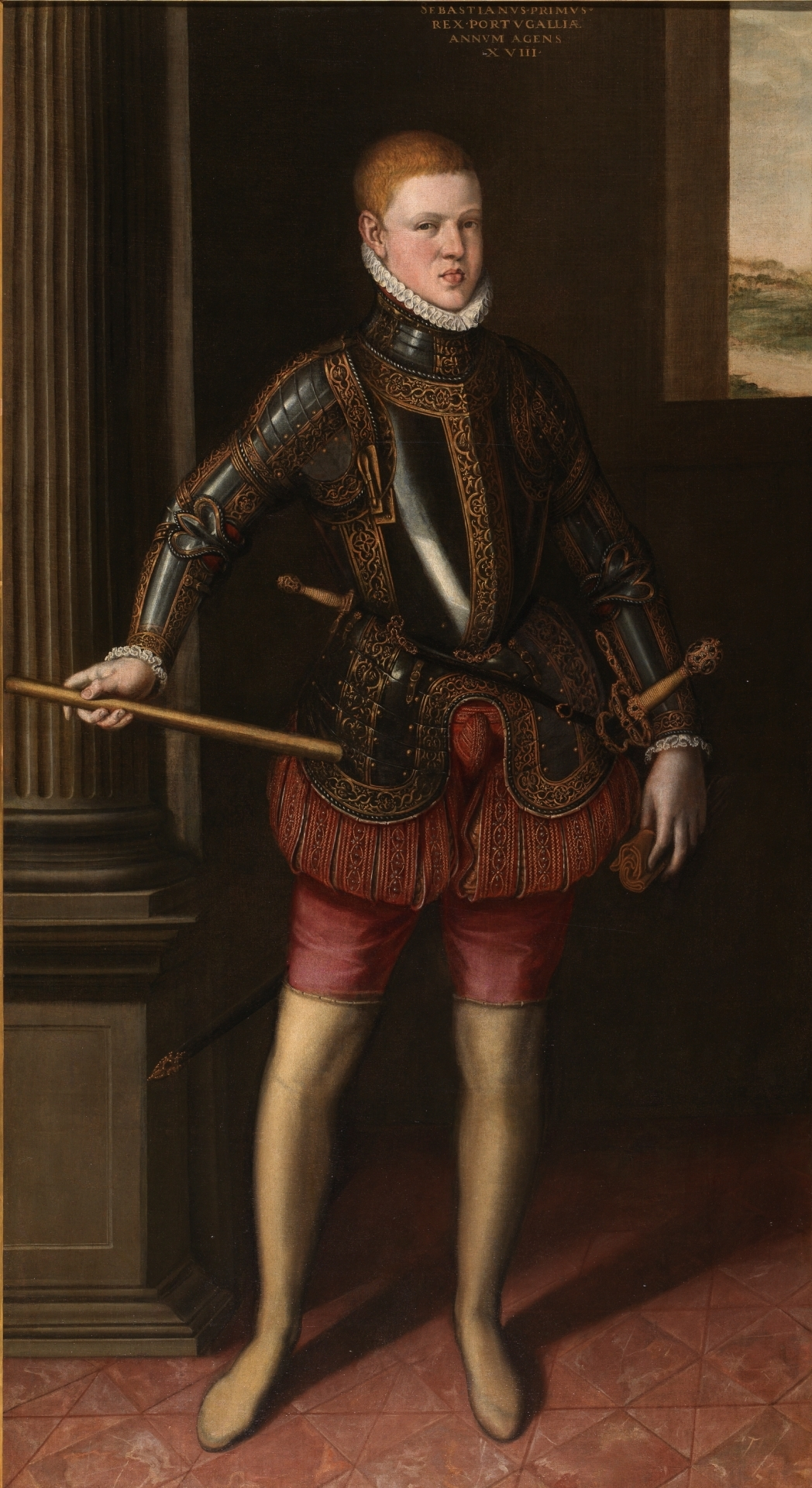
Sebastian by Cristóvão de Morais, 1572.

Sebastian created laws for the military, the Lei das Armas, that would become a military organization model. Goa was attacked by a pan-Asian alliance in 1570 during the War of the League of the Indies, but the Portuguese were successful in repulsing the assault. Also in 1570, Sebastian ordered that the Brazilian Indians should not be used as slaves and ordered the release of those held in captivity.

In 1572, the poet Luís de Camões presented his masterpiece Os Lusíadas and dedicated a poem to Sebastian that won him a royal pension. In 1573, he commissioned the construction of the Royal Basilica in Castro Verde as a tribute to the Battle of Ourique. In 1575 with the Carta de Lei de Almeirim, the king established a system of measures for solid and liquid products and also defined the role of public servants.

The Celeiros Comuns (Communal Granaries) were inaugurated in 1576 on Sebastian's orders. These were lending institutions intended to help to poor farmers when farm production decreased, giving credit, lending seeds and commodities to the needy. They were allowed to pay back their debts with farm products when they recovered from losses.

The mathematician and cosmographer Pedro Nunes was appointed by Sebastian as a cosmography teacher for sea pilots. It was during Sebastian's reign that Nunes wrote his Petri Nonii Salaciensis Opera.

In 1577, Sebastian's ordinance Da nova ordem do juízo, sobre o abreviar das demandas, e execução dellas decreased the time for handling legal actions, regulated the action of lawyers, scribes and other court officials, and created fines for delays.

== Last projects ==
After attaining his majority in 1568, Sebastian dreamed of a great crusade against the kingdom of Morocco, where over the preceding generation several Portuguese way stations on the route to India had been lost.

A Moroccan succession struggle gave him the opportunity, when Abu Abdallah Mohammed II Saadi lost his throne in 1576 and fled to Portugal. After arriving, he asked for King Sebastian's assistance in defeating his Turkish-backed uncle and rival, Abu Marwan Abd al-Malik I Saadi.

During the Christmastide of 1577, Sebastian met with his uncle King Philip II of Spain at Guadalupe. Philip refused to be party to the crusade as he was negotiating a truce with the Ottoman Empire, though he promised a contingent of Spanish volunteers.

Despite his lack of a son and heir, King Sebastian embarked on his crusade in 1578. The Portuguese army of 17,000 men, including a significant number of foreign mercenaries hired from the Holy Roman Empire, the Netherlands, Spain, and the Italian States, and almost all of the country's nobility, sailed at the beginning of June from Lisbon. They visited Cádiz, where they expected to find Spanish volunteers who failed to appear, then crossed into Morocco.

=== Disappearance and probable death in battle ===
Personal banner of King Sebastian used at the battle

At Arzila, Sebastian joined his ally Abu Abdullah Mohammed II, who had around 6,000 Moorish soldiers and, against the advice of his commanders, marched into the interior. At the Battle of Alcácer Quibir (Battle of the Three Kings), the Portuguese army was routed by Abd Al-Malik at the head of more than 60,000 men.

He was last seen riding headlong into the enemy lines. Whether his body was ever found is uncertain, but Philip II of Spain claimed to have received his remains from Morocco and buried them in the Jerónimos Monastery in Belém, Lisbon, after he ascended to the Portuguese throne in 1580. The body could not be identified as Sebastian's, however, which left some people unconvinced of his death. Sebastian was succeeded as king by his great-uncle Henry, brother of his grandfather, King John III.

== Legend and legacy ==
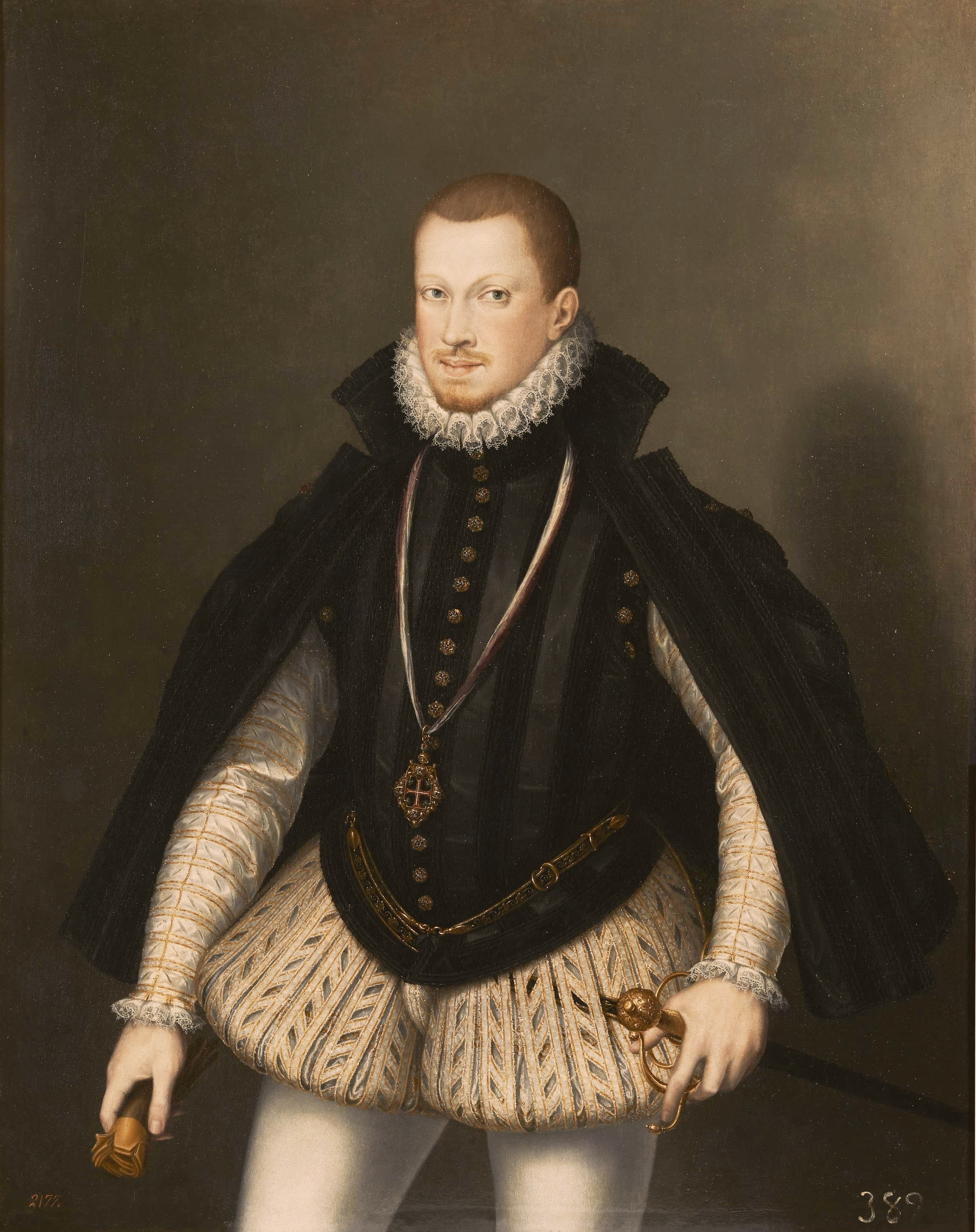
Portrait by Alonso Sanches Coelho, c. 1574–78

Throughout the centuries, the personality and legacy of Sebastian caused a multitude of appreciations to be produced, negative or positive, though seldom indifferent. Timothy Coates wrote that:

...he was an immature and headstrong youth. His insistence on continuing the reconquista (the Christian reconquest of Iberia from its Islamic rulers) into Morocco led not only to his death but ultimately to the end of the House of Aviz.

Anthony R. Disney, one of the foremost recent scholars of Portuguese history in English commented on the other hand that:

Sebastião was one of the most extraordinary monarchs that Portugal ever produced. Ascending the throne in an atmosphere of great emotion, he was widely acclaimed as the answer to his subjects' prayers and a prince who would save his country's independence. Two decades later, he achieved precisely the opposite, dying heroically but unnecessarily on the distant North African battlefield of Al-Ksar al-Kabir on 4 August 1578, leaving no heir to succeed him. [...] He was in many ways conscientious about the duties of kingship, enacted much legislation and showed considerable compassion for the poor.

=== Pretenders ===
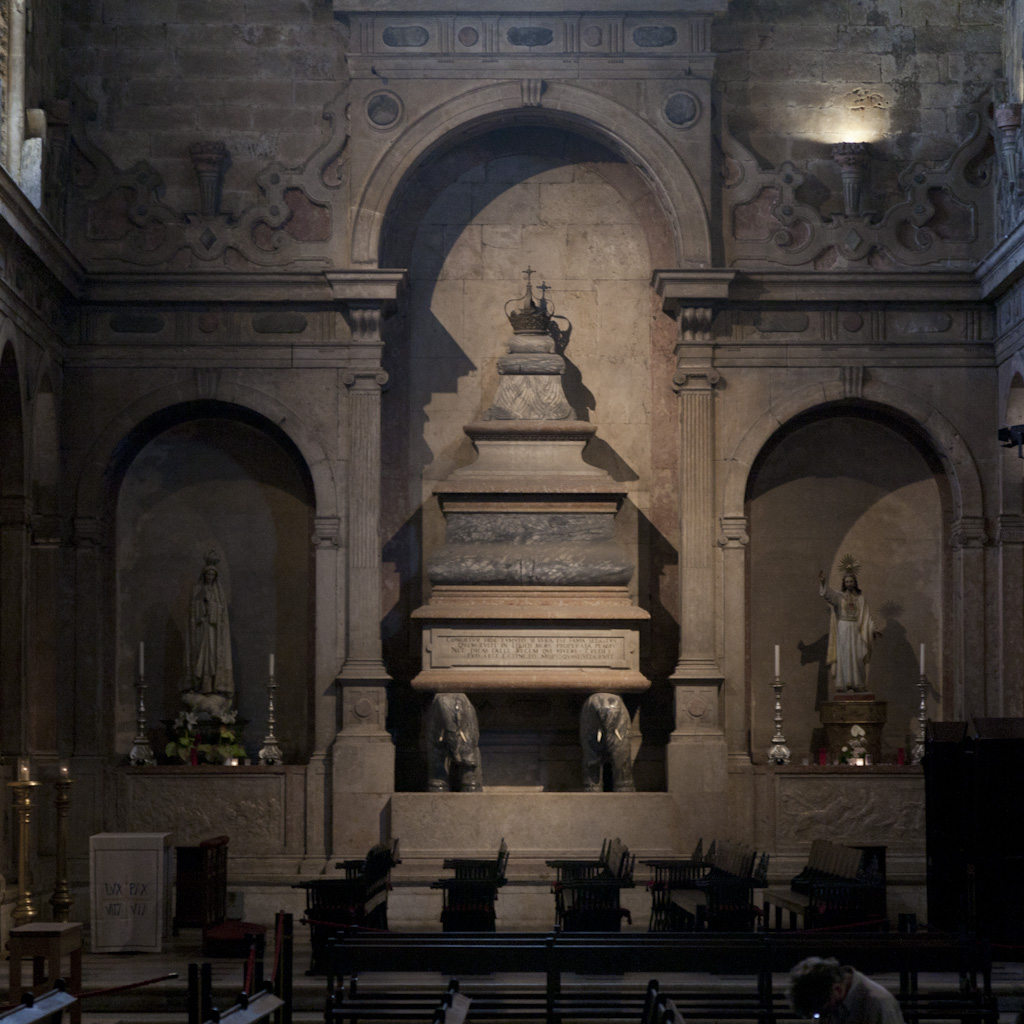
Tomb in the Jerónimos Monastery in Lisbon, erected by order of King Philip I of Portugal and occupied by a body that is not confirmed to be Sebastian

After the defeat at Alcácer Quibir, many efforts were made to ransom imprisoned Portuguese soldiers in Morocco. Several soldiers returned to Portugal, which led many Portuguese to believe Sebastian had survived the battle and would return to claim his throne. This led to Sebastianism, the belief that Sebastian could return at any moment. Politically, there was a belief that Philip was not the rightful heir to the throne. Subsequently, imposter pretenders appeared in Portugal and Castile who fraudulently claimed to be the king. During the time of the Iberian Union, between 1580 and 1640, four different pretenders claimed to be the returned King Sebastian, including Gabriel de Espinosa. The last of these pretenders, who was in fact an Italian, was hanged in 1619, while another was obtained by the Spanish from Venice, tried, found guilty and hanged in 1603.

In the long term, many myths and legends about Sebastian appeared, the principal one being that he was a great Portuguese patriot, the "sleeping king" who would return to help Portugal in its darkest hour (similar to the Britons' King Arthur, the German Frederick Barbarossa or the Byzantine Constantine XI Palaeologus).

He came to be known by symbolic names: O Encoberto (The Shrouded One) who would return on a foggy morning to save Portugal, or as O Desejado (The Desired One). These legends were vigorously promoted through the massive circulation of popular rhymes (trovas) written by António Gonçalves de Bandarra. Even as late as the 19th century, "Sebastianist" peasants in the town of Canudos in the Brazilian sertão believed that the king would return to help them in their rebellion against the "godless" Brazilian republic.

Sebastian's life was dramatised in 1843 in the opera Dom Sébastien by the Italian composer Gaetano Donizetti. Belgian playwright Paul Dresse also dramatised his life in the 1975 play Sébastien de Portugal ou le Capitaine de Dieu. The legend of Sebastian's disappearance and alleged return is the basis for the popular song "A Lenda d'El Rei D. Sebastião" ("The Legend of King Sebastian") by the Portuguese band Quarteto 1111 (1968).

=== In Morocco ===
Though defeated in battle, Sebastian's reputation in Morocco remained a positive one for centuries, as a symbol of a high ideal of chivalry. While on an archeological journey through the Spanish Protectorate in Morocco in 1923, the Portuguese archeologist, heraldist, and geneologist Afonso de Dornellas was informed by the minister of finance El Hach Abd Selam Ben El Arbi Benuna that "there were Portuguese here of such breadth that for many leagues in distance they were spoken of with respect and admiration by the Arabs. If there were ancestors of mine with names recorded in history as worthy warriors it's because they fought those Portuguese" and that "for a king to leave his greatness, his life of luxury, of glamour and to embark en masse with his people to fight here for their faith" had set a high example at a time when Morocco had just reunified after a long period of violent internal conflict over petty disputes, though Benuna was surprised to learn that the Portuguese are unsure whether the bones in Belém are his. At Asilah, the governor Baxa Xerife Sid Mustafa Ben Raisun who received Dornellas commission stated that "this is where Sebastian landed, the great king of the Portuguese and whom we still esteem today as though he was the best of our kings".

== See also ==
- List of people who disappeared mysteriously: pre-1910
- Rossio railway station – Railway station in Portugal

Sebastian, King of Portugal House of Aviz Cadet branch of the House of Burgundy Born: 20 January 1554 Died: 4 August 1578
Regnal titles
| Preceded by John III | King of Portugal; 1557–1578 | Succeeded by Henry |
Portuguese royalty
| Preceded by John | Prince of Portugal; 1554–1557 | Succeeded by Manuel |
