= Madrigal de las Altas Torres =

- Municipality
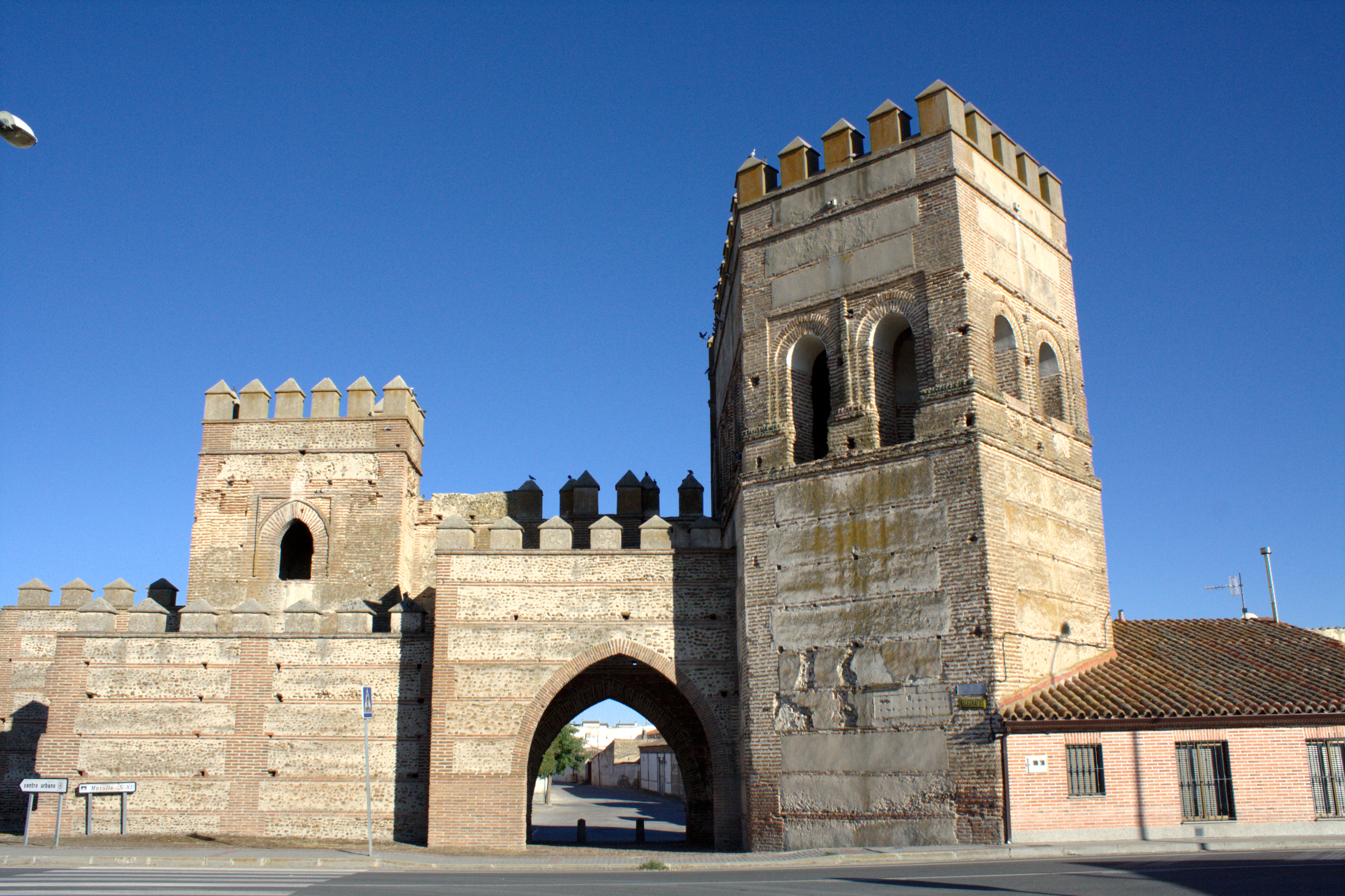

- Coat of arms
- Interactive map of Madrigal de las Altas Torres
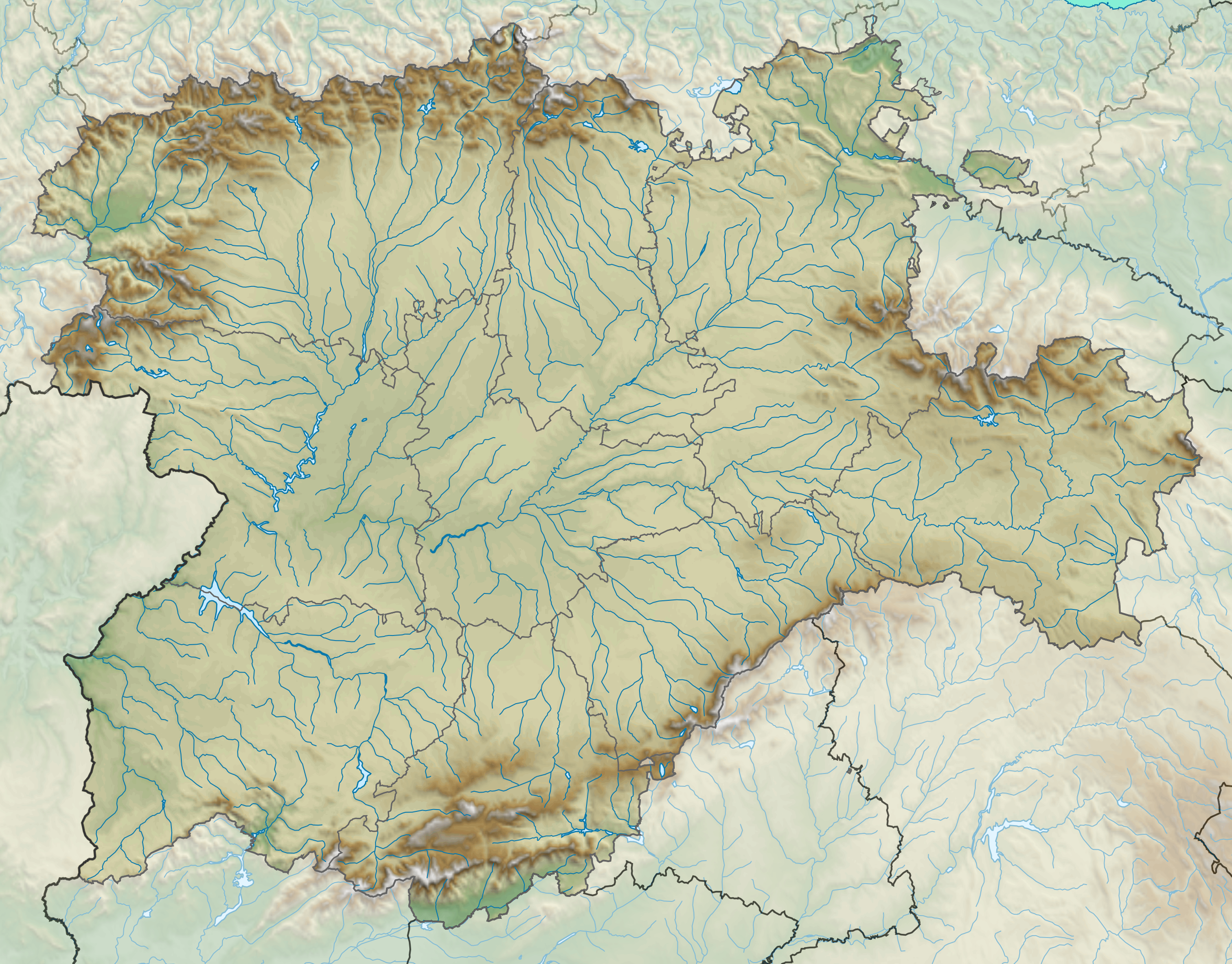
- Location in Spain Madrigal de las Altas Torres (Spain)
- Coordinates: 41°05′22″N 4°59′56″W
- Country: Spain
- Autonomous community: Castile and León
- Province: Ávila

Area
  - Total: 106.80 km^{2} (41.24 sq mi)
- Elevation: 809 m (2,654 ft)

Population (2025-01-01)
  - Total: 1,281
- Website: Official website

Madrigal de las Altas Torres (in English: Madrigal of the high towers) is a municipality of Spain located in the province of Ávila, autonomous community of Castile and León. Displaying a total area of 106.80 km^{2}. The municipality is located in the northernmost end of the province of Ávila, near the provinces of Salamanca and Valladolid.

The toponym is recorded earliest in the middle ages as Matrigale and Madrigal, whilst the second part of the current placename is a late modern addition. Hitherto a hamlet of the land of Arévalo, Madrigal earned a fuero in 1017 (ratified in 1168), becoming closely linked to the affairs of the House of Trastámara in the late middle ages.

The town was encircled by walls in the Middle Ages (following a near-circular outline). Today some parts of the walls are still preserved, most notably the southwestern part. Madrigal experienced a massive rural flight after the 1950s. The Junta of Castile and León declared the historical centre of the municipality as bien de interés cultural (conjunto histórico) in September 2020.

== Population ==
Historical population
Year	Pop.	±% p.a.
2023	1,338	—
2024	1,299	−2.91%
2025	1,281	−1.39%
Source: INE

== Notable people ==
- Vasco de Quiroga (1477/1479 Madrigal de las Altas Torres (Ávila) - 1565 Quiroga (Michoacán, México)
- Alonso Tostado (d. 1455)
- Isabella I of Castile (1451–1504), Queen of Castile
- Catalina de Balmaseda y San Martín, prioress, was born here in 1543.
