= Batala =

- City
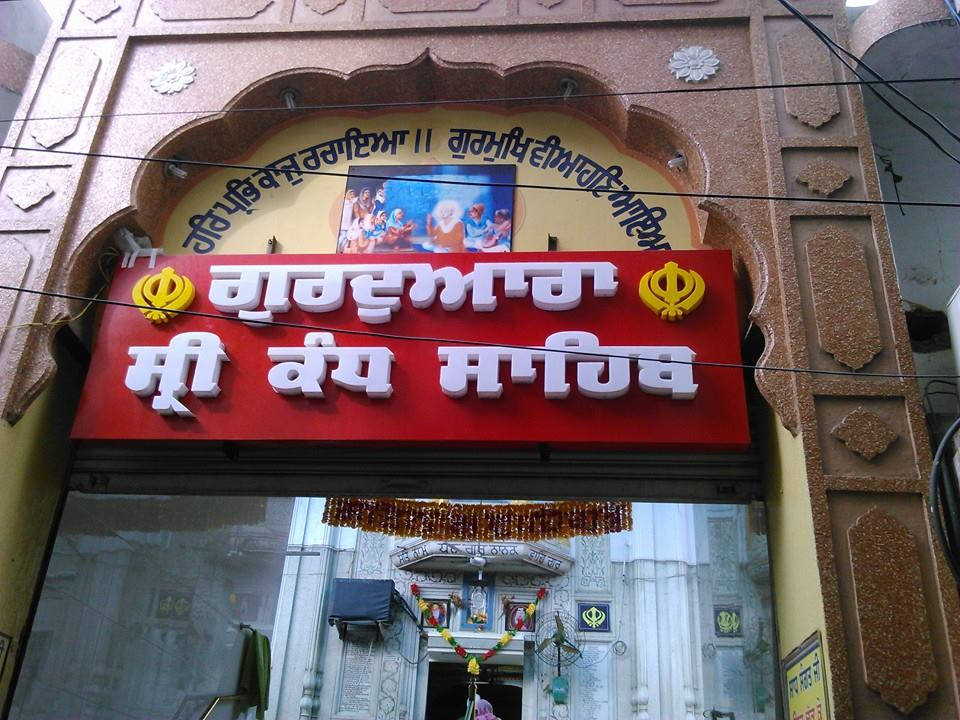
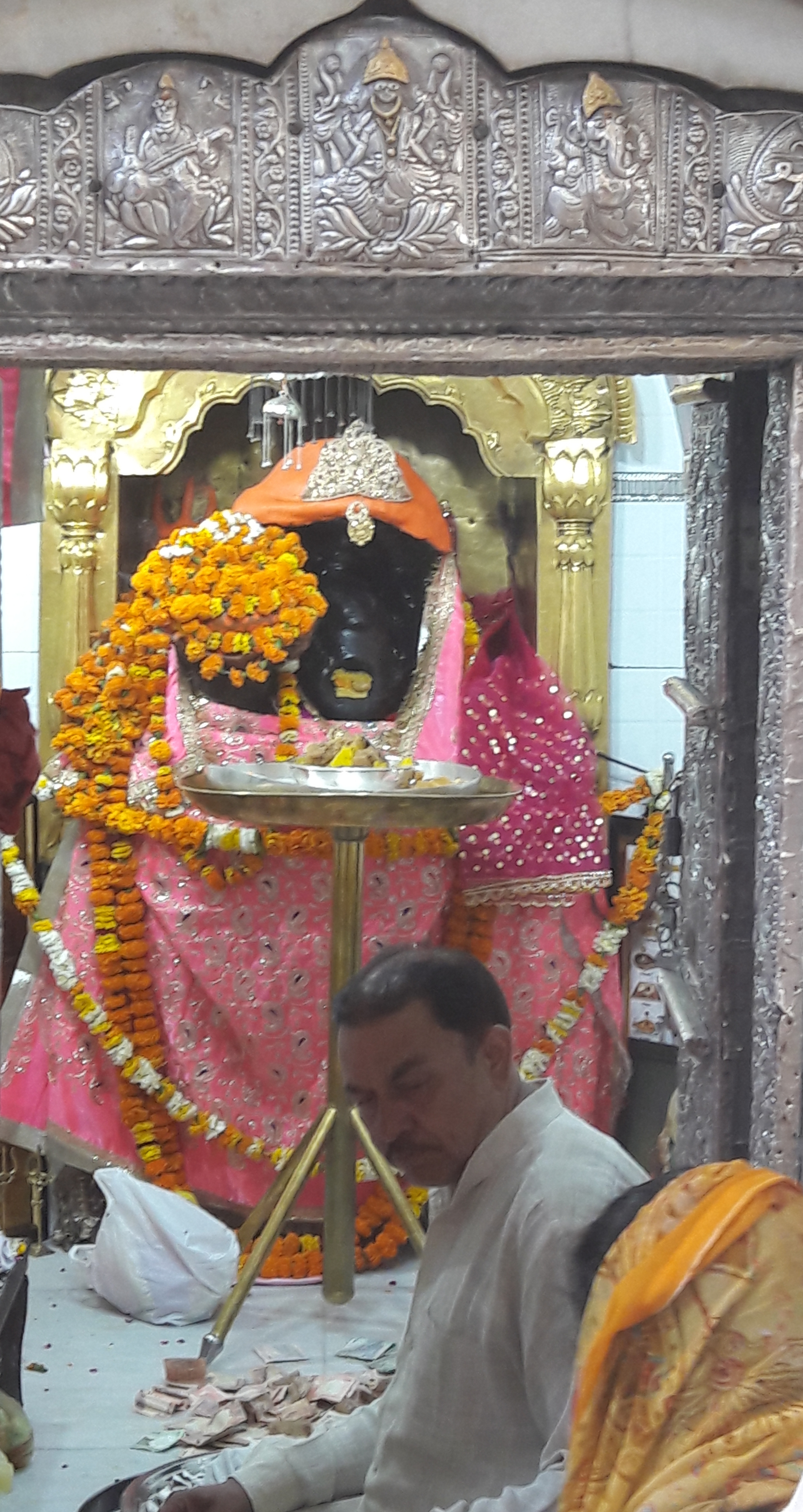
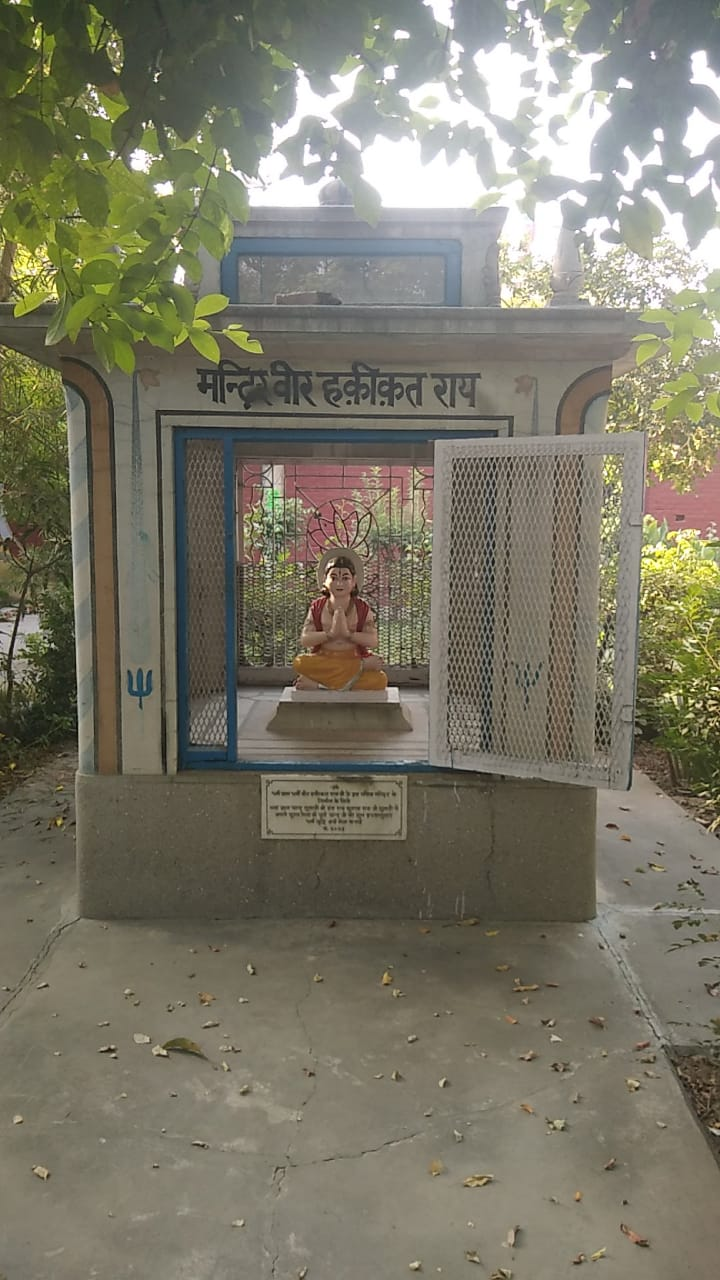
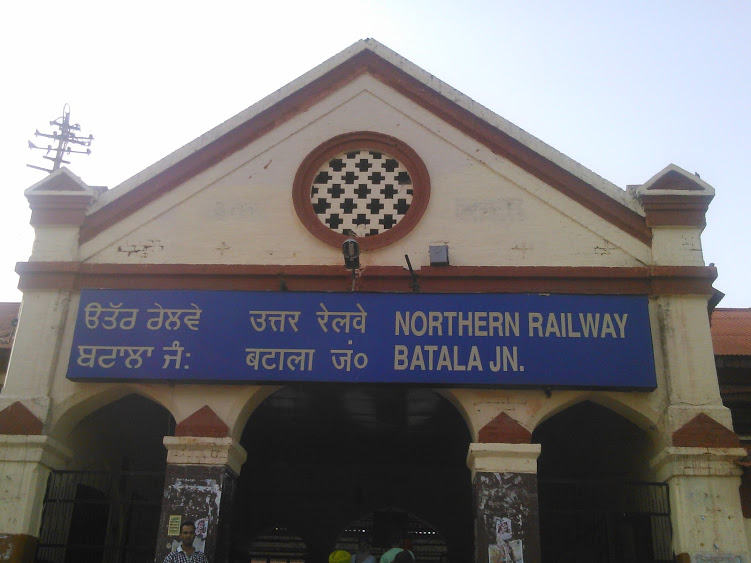
- Gurudwara Kandh Sahib, Kali Mata Mandir, Haqiqat Rai temple, Batala railway station entry

- Location in Punjab, India Batala (India) Batala (Asia)
- Coordinates: 31.8186°N 75.2028°E
- Country: India
- State: Punjab
- District: Gurdaspur
- Region: Majha
- Established: 1465

Government
  - Type: Local Self Government
  - Body: Batala Municipal Corporation
  - Mayor: Bhupinder Singh Bajwa

Area (2015)
  - City: 42 km^{2} (16 sq mi)
  - Rank: 8th
- Elevation: 249 m (817 ft)

Population (2015)
  - City: 211,594
  - Density: 5,000/km^{2} (13,000/sq mi)
  - Metro: 617,780

Languages
  - Official: Punjabi
- Time zone: UTC+5:30 (IST)
- PIN: 143505
- Telephone code: 01871
- Vehicle registration: PB-18
- Distance from Amritsar: 39 kilometres (24 mi) NE (land)
- Distance from Jalandhar: 78 kilometres (48 mi) NE (land)
- Distance from Chandigarh: 203 kilometres (126 mi) NE (land)
- Distance from Delhi: 470 kilometres (290 mi) NE (land)
- Lok Sabha constituency: Gurdaspur (Lok Sabha constituency)
- Punjab Legislative Assembly constituency: Batala Assembly Constituency

Batala is the eighth largest city in the state of Punjab, India in terms of population after Ludhiana, Amritsar, Jalandhar, Patiala, Bathinda, Mohali and Hoshiarpur. Batala ranks as the second-oldest city after Bathinda. It is a municipal corporation (since 3 March 2019) in Gurdaspur district in the Majha region of the state of Punjab. It is located from holy city Amritsar 39 km and about 32km from Gurdaspur, the headquarters of the district. It is also a Police district. Batala holds the status of the most populated town of the district with 31% of the district's total population. It is the biggest industrial town in the district.

Batala is an important place for Sikh devotees. Guru Nanak, the founder of the Sikh religion was married here to Mata Sulakhni, the daughter of Mul Chand Chauna in 1485. Many temples and gurdwaras related to the guru's marriage attract devotees from near and far. Every year celebrations are conducted on the anniversary of Nanak's marriage (Babe Nanak Da Viah) at Gurudwara Kandh Sahib. There is also a historical gurdwara Satkartarian Sahib related to 6th guru of Sikhs, Guru Hargobind.

Batala was once known as the "Iron Bird of Asia" as it produced the highest amount of cast iron, agricultural and mechanical machinery. Batala is still one of the leading cities in Northern India in manufacturing of cast iron and mechanical machinery. It is also an agricultural marketplace and industrial center. Cotton ginning, weaving, sugar refining, and rice milling are some of other industries.

== History ==
Batala was founded in 1465 by Abhay Pratap Bal of the Bhati Rajputs of Kapurthala, under the suzerainty of Sultan Bahlul Lodi. During the Mughal Empire, Emperor Akbar granted the city as a jagir to his foster brother, Shamsher Khan. In the 16th century, Batala was one of the prominent cities in the Punjab region, comparable in importance to cities such as Lahore and Jalandhar. It predates Amritsar by over a century.

Historically, Batala was a fortified city with 12 gates, many of which are still known by their original names, including Sheran Wala Gate, Khajuri Gate, Bhandari Gate, Ohri Gate, Thathiari Gate, Hathi Gate, Pahari Gate, Mori Gate, Kapoori Gate, and Achli Gate. Some of these structures still exist today, though they are in varying states of preservation.

Batala is home to several gurdwaras, including those associated with Guru Nanak, the founder of Sikhism. These sites are of great religious importance and attract thousands of Sikh pilgrims annually.

Under British India, Batala served as the headquarters of a tehsil in the Gurdaspur District of the Punjab Province. The allocation of this district during the partition of India in 1947 was highly contested due to its nearly equal population of Muslims and non-Muslims. Initially, the Viceroy Lord Wavell assigned the three eastern tehsils—Gurdaspur, Batala, and Pathankot—to India, and the western tehsil, Shakargarh, to Pakistan.

The entire district of Gurdaspur was depicted as part of Pakistan in the 'notional partition line' of the Indian Independence Act 1947, and the matter was referred to the Punjab Boundary Commission. Ultimately, the final partition line confirmed Wavell's division, placing Batala within Indian territory. For a brief period from 14 to 17 August 1947, Batala was considered part of Pakistan before being officially incorporated into India.

At the time of Partition, Batala had a Muslim majority population. Following the announcement of the final boundary, most Muslims migrated to Pakistan, while Hindu and Sikh refugees from areas that became part of Pakistan settled in Batala. Today, the city has a Hindu majority (approximately 56%) and a significant Sikh minority (about 38%).

== Politics ==
The city is part of the Batala Assembly Constituency. Mainly, the Indian National Congress has a stronghold over the constituency as it won assembly elections 9 times out of 16. Bharatiya Jana Sangh/Bharatiya Janata Party won 4 times, Janata Party, Shiromani Akali Dal and Aam Aadmi Party each won 1 time. Amansher Singh is the incumbent MLA who belongs to Aam Aadmi Party.

Batala is also a Municipal Corporation in India which was upgraded in the year of 2019 from Municipal Council. The Municipal Corporation of Batala is administered by the Punjab Municipal Act, 1911. The departments under the Municipal Corporation of Batala are: General Branch, Tax Branch, Engineering Branch, Accounts Branch, Health Branch, Birth Branch, Fire Branch, Record Branch.

There are 50 wards under the Municipal Corporation of Batala.

Gursimran Singh Dhillon is the Commissioner of Batala Municipal Corporation. The Mayor of Batala is Bhupinder Singh, the Deputy Mayors are Sukhraj Kaur and Neelam Chouhan.

In the Financial Year, 2025-26, the Batala Municipal Corporation's revenue receipt was ₹43,45,11,000, the revenue expenditure was ₹46,82,30,000 and the capital expenditure was ₹45,00,000.

Latest election for the Corporation were held in the year of 2026 which was won by AAP.

=== Villages ===
Name	Population
Aliwal Jattan	470
Araianwali	155
Attepur	N/A
Badowal Khurd	1,378
Bajjuman	1,836
Basarpura	1,659
Bajjuman	1,836
Balarwal	1,229
Basrai	3,565
Bhadur Hussain	2,209
Bhagtupur	1,420
Bhalowali	1,106
Bhamboi	2,504
Bhamri	3,327
Bharathwal	948
Bhole Ke	1,739
Bijliwal	1,685
Bishniwal	543
Bohja	2,155
Bujjianwali	984
Bure Nangal	1,171
Chahgill	278
Chahal Khurd	477
Chak Bhagtupur	67
Chak Chao	670
Chak Sidhwan	63
Chak Tara	418
Chak Wassan	398
Chandke	207
Chandu Suja	774
Chataurgarh	1,111
Chaudhriwala	2,654
Cheema Kalla	194
Chhapianwali	293
Chhelowal	968
Chhit	1,080
Choranwali	604
Chuhewal	1,138
Dewaniwal	2,141
Dhadialanatt	3,878
Dhandoi	2,015
Doburji	606
Kazampur	834
Khokhowal	221
Mathola	2,403
Meekey	1,285
Mehmedpur	416
Mehtewal	465
Missarpura	1,717
Mollowali	309
Mulianwali	2522
Nangal Buttar	1,047
Nangal Jhawar	1,455
Nathwal	1,155
Nawan Pind Barqiwala	395
Nawan Pind Mahmawala	324
Nawan Pind Milkhi-wala	751
Parowal	1,407
Phulke	1,034
Pind Purana	1,439
Pinda Rori	526
Pirowali	589
Punwan	947
Purian Kalan	2,153
Purian Khurd	736
Qila Lal Singh	2,141
Qila Tek Singh	1,000
Rajputan	754
Rikhia	848
Rupowali	988
Raliali Khurd	670
Riali Kalan	939
Sagarpur	451
Sahan Pannu	69
Sakhowal	1,560
Sangherah	945
Sarchur	1,989
Sarupwali	2,294
Sarwali	1,987
Seikhwan	924
Shahpur Araian	366
Sham Sherpur	2,558
Sheikhowali	215
Sheikhwan	1,592
Sokala	1,486
Talwandi Bha-rath	3,150
Talwandi Goraya	1,179
Talwandi Jhunglan	1,718
Tenaniwal	198
Thindh	861
Thirriyewal	1,151
Udhanwal	2,088
Ugrewala	975
Winjwan	1,460
Withwan	640

== Police Administration ==
Batala became a police district in 1988, on 19 April, when the Government of Punjab issued an official notification on 17 April 1988. Since then, Senior Superintendent of Police (SSP) is the head of the Police department of Batala. The SSP is either selected from Indian Police Service or State Police Services, i.e. Punjab Police. The incumbent SSP of Batala is Suhail Qasin Mir, serving on this post since 3 August 2024. Sumedh Singh Saini was the first SSP of Batala on the creation of Batala as Police district. He later became Director general of police Punjab.

=== List of Senior Superintendent of Police Batala ===
- IPS - Indian Police Service
- PPS - Punjab Police Service

S. No.	Name	Took office	Left office	Tenure
1	Sumedh Singh Saini (IPS)	19 April 1988	1 August 1988	104 days
2	S. M. Sharma (IPS)	1 August 1988	11 December 1988	132 days
3	Gobind Ram (IPS)	11 December 1988	13 September 1989	276 days
4	S. K. Goel (IPS)	13 September 1989	30 April 1990	229 days
5	Jagdish Kumar (PPS)	2 May 1990	15 July 1990	74 days
6	Sita Ram Rattan (PPS)	15 July 1990	8 January 1992	1 year, 177 days
7	C. S. R. Reddy (IPS)	8 January 1992	2 January 1993	360 days
8	Rohit Choudary (IPS)	2 January 1993	12 January 1996	3 years, 10 days
9	Prabodh Kumar (IPS)	13 January 1996	17 February 1996	35 days
10	Ranbir Singh Khatra (PPS)	18 February 1996	2 December 1996	288 days
11	Loknath Angra (PPS)	2 December 1996	27 April 2000	3 years, 147 days
12	S. S. Brar (PPS)	27 April 2000	30 January 2002	1 year, 278 days
13	R. K. Sharda (PPS)	4 February 2002	7 March 2002	31 days
14	V. Neerja (IPS)	7 March 2002	4 August 2002	150 days
15	Naresh Kumar (IPS)	5 August 2002	13 September 2003	1 year, 39 days
16	Ram Singh (IPS)	13 September 2003	12 December 2004	1 year, 90 days
17	Jatinder Jain (IPS)	13 December 2004	15 April 2006	1 year, 123 days
18	L. K. Yadav (IPS)	15 April 2006	13 March 2007	332 days
19	Kunwar Vijay Pratap Singh (IPS)	13 March 2007	17 April 2007	35 days
20	Rajendra Namdeo Dhoke (IPS)	22 April 2007	5 May 2008	1 year, 13 days
(15)	Naresh Kumar (IPS)	8 May 2008	7 July 2009	1 year, 60 days
21	D. P. Singh (IPS)	1 October 2009	1 September 2010	335 days
22	Gurdeep Singh (PPS)	1 October 2010	25 July 2011	297 days
23	Gurkirpal Singh (PPS)	25 July 2010	23 April 2012	2 years, 151 days
24	Rajpal Singh Sandhu	23 April 2012	12 October 2012	172 days
25	Tulsi Ram (IPS)	12 October 2012	24 August 2013	316 days
26	Surinderjit Singj Mand (PPS)	24 August 2013	27 February 2014	187 days
27	Harjinder Singh Sandhu (IPS)	27 February 2014	31 May 2014	93 days
28	Bikrampal Singh Bhatty (IPS)	31 May 2014	7 August 2014	68 days
29	Maninder Singh (PPS)	11 August 2014	7 December 2014	118 days
30	Inderbir Singh (IPS)	7 December 2014	6 August 2015	242 days
31	Harpreet Singh (PPS)	6 August 2015	11 October 2015	66 days
32	Diljinder Singh Dhillon (PPS)	11 October 2015	23 December 2016	1 year, 73 days
33	Manmohan Kumar Sharma (PPS)	23 December 2016	7 January 2017	15 days
34	Deepak Hilary (IPS)	7 January 2017	3 July 2017	177 days
35	Opinderjit Singh Ghuman (PPS)	3 July 2017	31 July 2020	3 years, 28 days
36	Rachhpal Singh (PPS)	31 July 2020	31 July 2021	1 year, 0 days
37	Ashwani Kapur (IPS)	31 July 2021	21 August 2021	21 days
38	Mukhwinder Singh Bhullar (PPS)	14 October 2021	1 January 2022	79 days
39	Gaurav Toora (IPS)	1 January 2022	11 April 2022	100 days
40	Rajpal Singh (IPS)	18 April 2022	21 July 2022	94 days
41	Satinder Singh (IPS)	22 July 2022	16 February 2023	209 days
42	Ashwini Gotyal (IPS)	17 February 2023	3 August 2024	1 year, 168 days
43	Suhail Qasim Mir (IPS)	3 August 2024	20 November 2025	1 year, 109 days
45	Mehtab Singh (IPS)	20 November 2025	Incumbent	359 days

== Demographics ==
Religion in Batala City
Religion	Percent
Hinduism	56%
Sikhism	37.82%
Christianity	4.35%
Others	1.83%

As per provisional data from the 2011 census, the Batala urban agglomeration had a population of 158,404, out of which the males were 83,536 and females were 74,868. The literacy rate was 85.28 per cent.

The table below shows the population of different religious groups in Batala city and their gender ratio, as of 2011 census.

Population by religious groups in Batala city, 2011 census
Religion	Total	Female	Male	Gender ratio
Hindu	88,825	41,750	47,075	886
Sikh	59,996	28,406	31,590	899
Christian	6,897	3,289	3,608	911
Muslim	383	169	214	789
Jain	114	56	58	965
Buddhist	30	14	16	875
Other religions	34	14	20	700
Not stated	2,342	1,268	1,074	1180
Total	1,58,621	74,966	83,655	896

== Economy ==
=== Minerals ===
Foundry sand is found in Dharamkot, near Batala; the deposits are located 6.5 km west of Batala. Exposed on both sides of Batala–Dera Baba Nanak road, the Dharmkot sand is a natural moulding sand, containing about 20% clay. Another deposit which is about 4 metres thick, occurs at about 6 km from Batala on the Batala Qadian road. The sand has a yellowish tinge on the surface, but is reddish brown at a depth of about 1 metre.

The sand deposits are also found at Bhagwanpur about 15 km west of Batala on Dera Baba Nanak Road and about 10 km from Gurdaspur on the Gurdaspur Naushera Road (20 percent clay).

Salt petre occurs in the district at the villages of Thikriwala, Pandori in the tehsils of Gurdaspur and Dhawan, Chataurgarh and Badowal in the tehsil of Batala. It is a source of potassium nitrate which can be used for making crackers and gunpowder, in the match and sugar industries, and as fertilizer. It is also famous because of village bodhi di khui and also famous for bajwa people in it.

== Landmarks ==
Located in Gurdaspur district, 38 kilometres (24 mi) from Amritsar on the Kashmir Grand Trunk road. One of the older towns in the province of Lahore in earlier times, Batala is home to many monuments of religious and historic importance, such as Hazira Park, Barah Dari, Hakikat Samadh. These monuments are connected with Sikh history and the Mughal period. The city consists of several churches constructed during the British Raj.

=== Jal Mahal (Baradari) ===
The Jal Mahal and the palace of Maharaja Sher Singh were built by the Maharaja (CE 1780–1839). The palace is under the control of the authorities of the local Baring Union Christian College. The administrative offices of the college are housed in it. Jal Mahal is under the control of the Archaeological Survey of India (ASI). Jal Mahal (Baradari) and the palace of Maharaja Sher Singh were connected through a tunnel. According to some senior citizens, Shamsher Khan Tank of Jal Mahal used to be filled with water through the tunnel, which was further connected to a long tunnel (canal) to the Beas, near Kahnuwan. The remnants of the tunnel can be seen near Baring Christian College.

Maharaja Sher Singh used to hold meetings of his courtiers in Jal Mahal. The water reservoir was built by Shamsher Khan while the beautiful Baradari in the centre of the tank was constructed by Maharaja Sher Singh. It has a square room in the centre of a pavilion with a passageway. The entry to the first floor is by a staircase with concave-shaped steps on the north-eastern canal. Jal Mahal has eight doors in the lower part of the building and four in the upper storey. The inner wall contained beautiful art glass carvings and wall paintings. However, major parts of the paintings have been erased or damaged. The roof of the pavilion has also fallen. The Municipal Council provided a tubewell to fill up the tank till the eighties. All sides of the reservoir were lined with Nanakshahi bricks. However, with the passage of time the brick lining has been destroyed. Nowadays, on one side of the tank is located a vridh ashram owned and managed by the Dainik Prarthana Sabha. There also exists Bhadr Kali Mandir and Shivala. The upper portion of Jal Mahal is in a dilapidated condition and the time is not far when this magnificent structure will pass into oblivion.

=== Gurdwara Kandh Sahib ===
Guru Nanak Dev Ji was married here to Bibi Sulakhani Ji. He was engaged to the daughter of Mul Chand Chauna who along with the Brahmin priests insisted on a traditional Hindu marriage while Guru Nanak Dev Ji wanted a simple marriage. Guru Nanak Dev ji was sitting beside a crooked mud wall (kandh) discussing the marriage plans with the Brahmin clergy. It was planned to push the wall on top of the Guru but Guru Nanak Dev ji was warned of the plan by an old woman. Guru Nanak Dev Ji just smiled and said "This wall will not fall for centuries. The will of God shall prevail." The wall is still preserved within the Gurdwara and a celebration is held here every year on the anniversary of Guru Nanak's marriage. At walking distance of two minutes there is Gurudwara Dera sahib, which was house of Mata Sulakhni Ji (bride of Guru Nanak dev ji). An ancient well is situated in Gurudwara dera sahib, it is said that water of well is having special curing powers in itself.

=== Kali Dwara Mandir ===
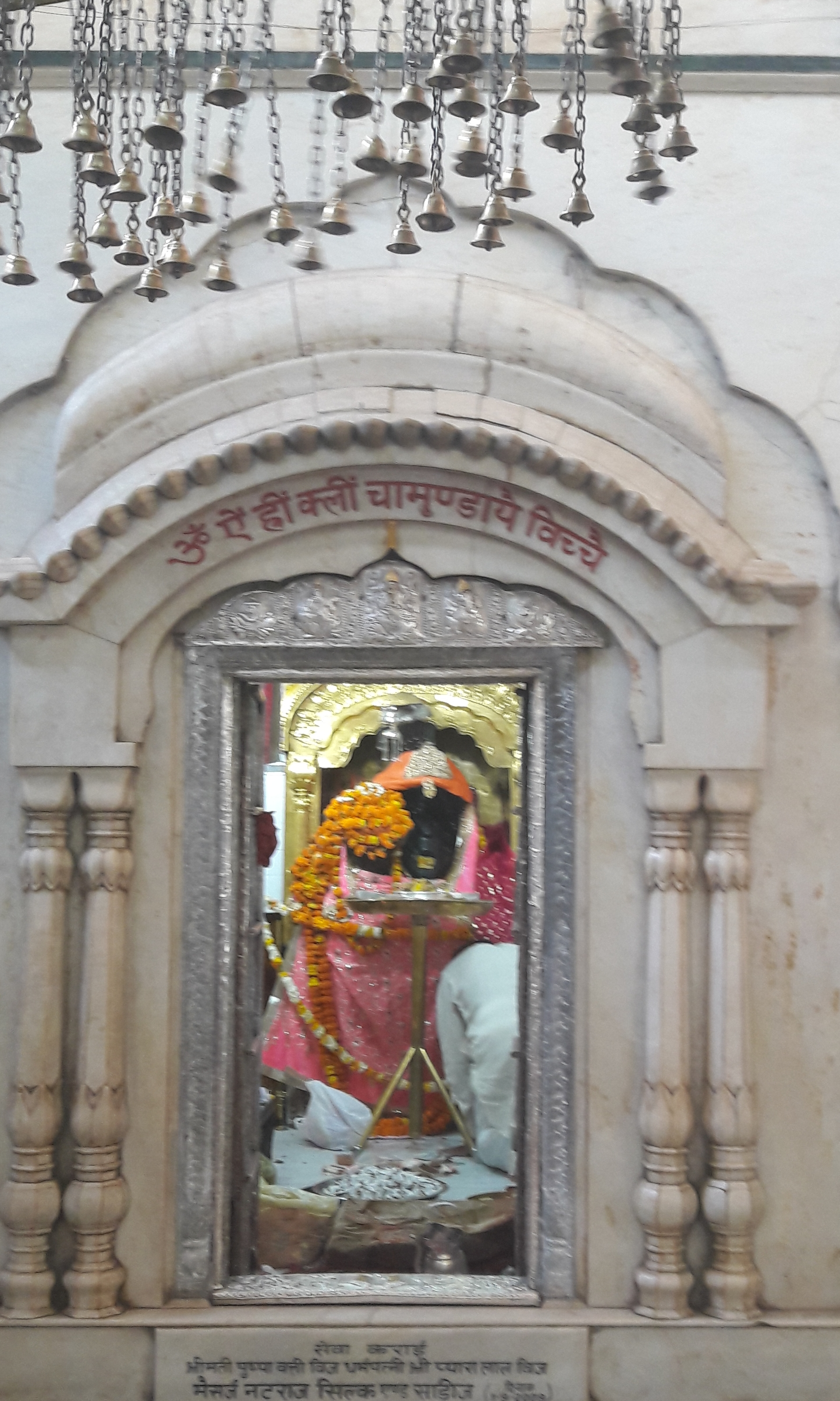
Kalidwara Mandir

Another very famous and the most-visited devotional place here is the temple dedicated to Goddess Kali. It's situated in the heart of city i.e., Chakri Bazar and maximum rush is seen on Tuesdays. During Navratri time, a lot of people from city and surrounding region visit the temple. People of Batala and outside have true faith on Mata Kali Dwara Mandir. Many other temples are also situated in Batala City.

=== Sati Lakshmi Devi Smadh ===
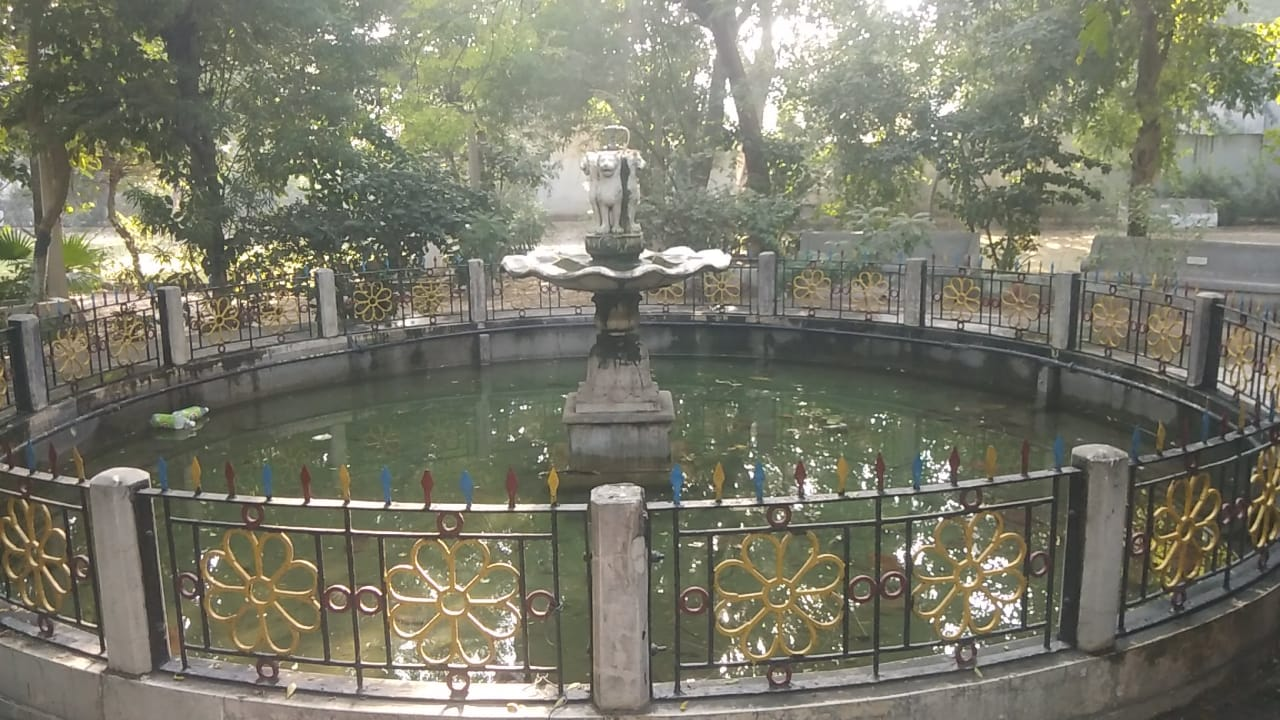
Fountain in smadh park

Sati Laxmi Devi Smarak is located in the Smadh road of Batala opposite to Hanuman Akahara, The Smadh of Sati Lakshmi devi is there, who was engaged to Veer Hakikat Rai, When Laxmi Devi heard the news of death of her becoming husband, She became Sati (throw herself in fire and burn to death), her age was 10 years at that time, On that place a big public park is made by Local People on the smadh of Veer Haqiqat Rai and Sati Lakshmi Devi.

== Transport ==
Batala is an important industrial town famous for the manufacture of machine tools and woolen products. Therefore, it is well connected with the other cities and towns of Punjab by road and railways. Government and private buses are the main source of journey to other cities. Batala has the only government bus depot in the district.

=== Bus ===
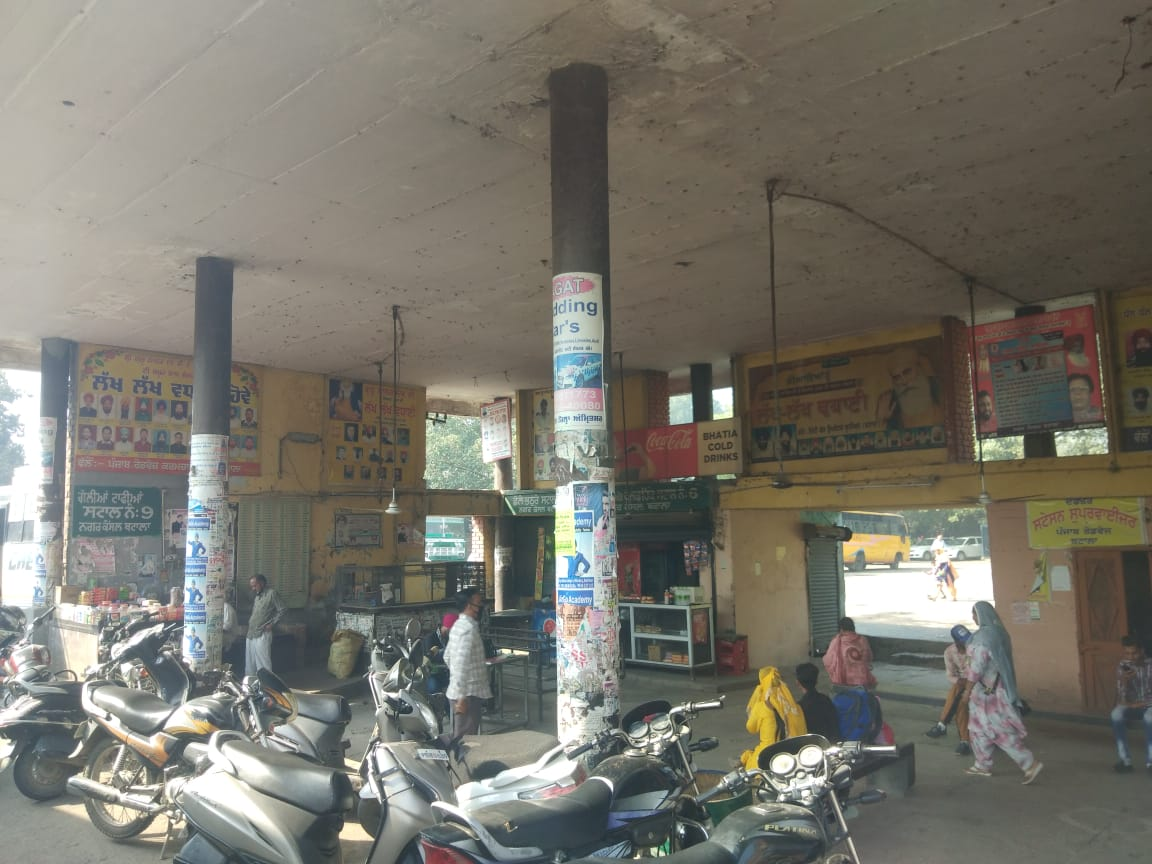
Bus Stand Batala (Buses for Jalandhar side)

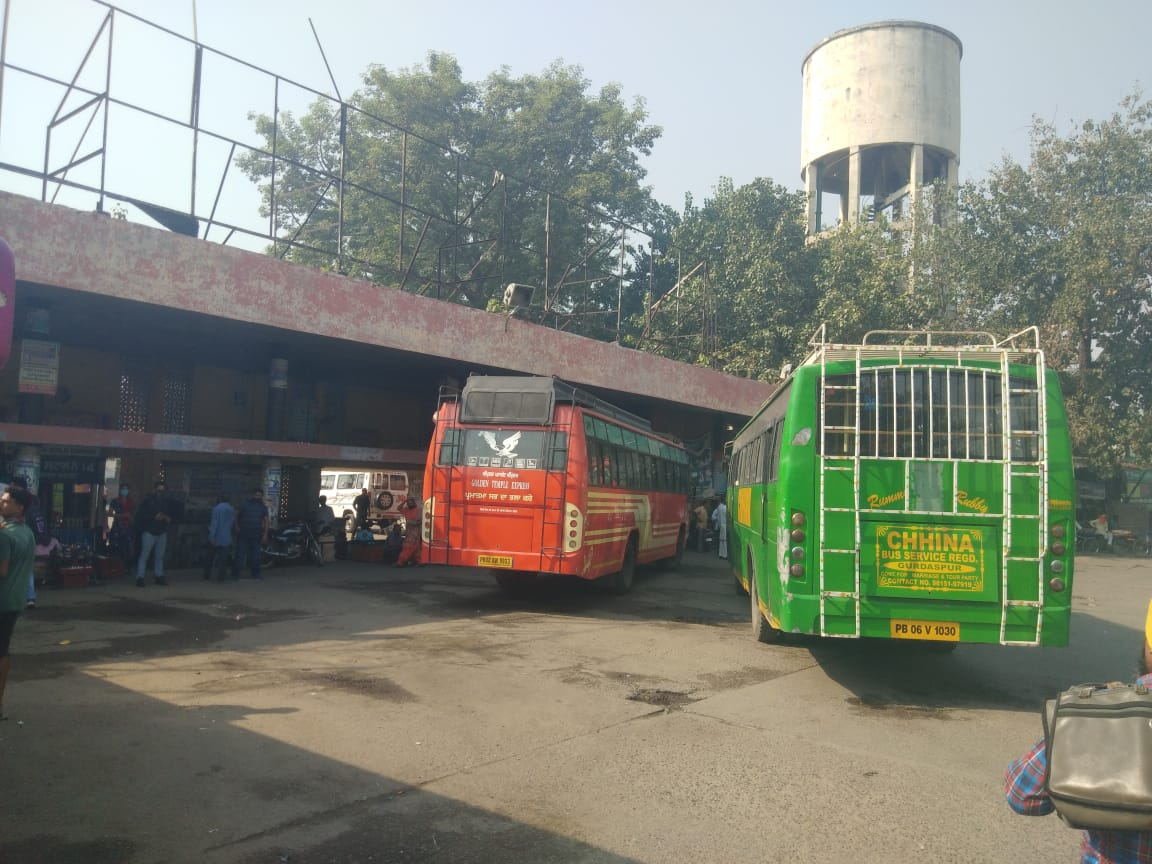
Bus Stand Batala (Buses for Gurdaspur side)

Bus Stand Batala is near Gandhi Chowk and people can normally commute to different cities via buses, everyday around 1,000 buses ferry more than 40,000 passengers.

=== Rail ===
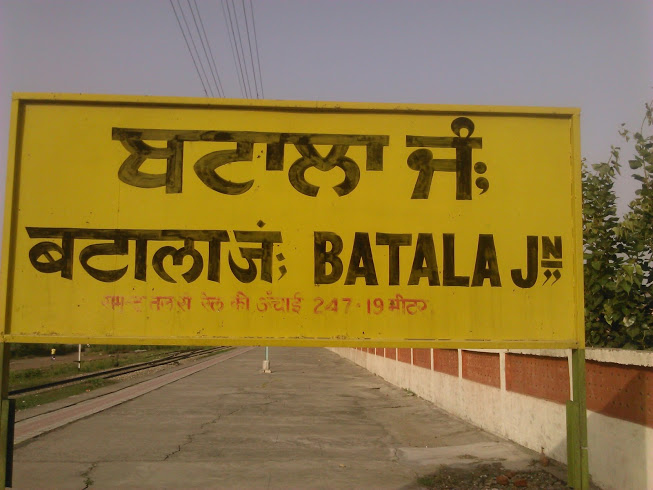
Batala railway station board

Batala railway station (station code BAT) is on the Amritsar–Pathankot line of the Firozpur division of the Northern Railway zone of the Indian Railways. Amritsar Junction railway station located about 38 kilometres (24 mi) from the town is the nearest major railway station. Train to Qadian is another diversion from Batala. Ministry of Railways has accepted in 2010 Budget plan to connect the Batala–Quadian rail link to Jalandhar via Beas Junction. The project would start soon. This project will help connect Batala to high-speed Amritsar–Delhi section and cutting travel time to Jalandhar by 1 hour, with no need to go via Amritsar.

=== Air ===
Guru Ram Das International Airport serving the city of Amritsar is the nearest international airport and is located about 40 km from the town. Pathankot Airport in Pathankot, situated 70 kilometres (43 mi) away from Batala is the nearest military airport.

== Hospitals ==
Batala has a number of hospitals, schools and colleges affiliated to different boards.

- Satsar Hospital, Batala
- Mahajan Hospital, Batala
- Navtej Humanity Hospital & Club
- Johal Surgical Hospital
- Civil Hospital, Batala
- Batala Hospital, Dera Road, Shukerpura, Batala
- Jagt Da Hospital
- bladeu hospital

== Education ==
During Ranjit Singh's rule, Qadri family, which was known for its scholarship, used to run a large prominent school in Batala, which used to attract students from as far as Iran and Afghanistan. Maharaja Ranjit Singh had donated a big jagir (estate) for the maintenance of this school. This jagir was later taken back by the British during their rule.

Colleges

- Baring Union Christian College (GNDU)

== Notable people ==
- Dev Anand – Indian actor, studied at Batala, Dharamshala and Lahore before partition.
- Riaz Batalvi – Pakistani journalist and writer.
- Shiv Kumar Batalvi – Indian poet.
- Muhammad Husayn Batalwi – Indian Ahl-i Hadith leader.
- Mohini Hameed – Pakistani radio broadcaster, anchor and actress.
- Bhupinder Singh Mann – Member of Parliament, Rajya Sabha (from 1990 to 1996), nominated by the President of India for outstanding contributions to the cause of Indian farmers.
- Gurpartap Singh Mann – Member of Punjab Public Service Commission (PPSC).
- Mumtaz Mufti – Pakistani writer, awarded the high Pakistani civilian award Sitara-e-Imtiaz and Munshi Premchand award.
- Jassa Singh Ramgarhia – Sikh Misaldar and ruler of Batala during the Sikh Misl period
- Surjit Singh Randhawa – hockey player of the Indian men's national hockey team.
- Prabhjot Singh – hockey player of the Indian men's national hockey team.

== See also ==
- Nahra
- Dadiala Najara
- Dadu Jodh
- Kastiwal
