= Nahra (disambiguation) =

Nahra is a village in Batala in Gurdaspur district of Punjab State, India. Nahra may also refer to:

- Azhar Qayyum Nahra (born 1977), member of the National Assembly of Pakistan
- Joseph J. Nahra (1927–2022), American lawyer and judge from Ohio
- Rafic Nahra (born 1959), Lebanese priest of the Catholic Church
