= Lal Singh (disambiguation) =

Lal Singh (died 1866) was the commander and wazir of Sikh Empire.

Lal Singh may also refer to:

- Chaudhary Lal Singh (born 1959), Indian politician
- Lal Singh (politician) (1942/1943–2026), Indian politician
- Lal Singh, Raja of Raghogarh from 1673-1697
- Laal Singh Chaddha, 2022 Indian film by Advait Chandan and its titular character, based on Forrest Gump
- Qila Lal Singh (lit. 'Fort Lal Singh'), a village in Punjab, India

== See also ==
- Lal Singh Dil (1943–2007), Indian poet
