= Punwan =

- Village
- Country: India
- State: Punjab
- District: Gurdaspur
- Tehsil: Batala
- Region: Majha

Government
  - Type: Panchayat raj
  - Body: Gram panchayat

Area
  - Total: 155 ha (380 acres)

Population (2011)
  - Total: 947; 500/447 ♂/♀
  - Scheduled Castes: 188; 94/94 ♂/♀
  - Total Households: 177

Languages
  - Official: Punjabi
- Time zone: UTC+5:30 (IST)
- Telephone: 01871
- ISO 3166 code: IN-PB
- Vehicle registration: PB-18
- Website: gurdaspur.nic.in

Punwan is a village in Batala in Gurdaspur district of Punjab State, India. It is located 22 kilometres (14 mi) from sub district headquarter, 50 kilometres (31 mi) from district headquarter and 14 kilometres (8.7 mi) from Sri Hargobindpur. The village is administrated by Sarpanch an elected representative of the village.

== Demography ==
As of 2011, the village has a total number of 177 houses and a population of 947 of which 500 are males while 447 are females. According to the report published by Census India in 2011, out of the total population of the village 188 people are from Schedule Caste and the village does not have any Schedule Tribe population so far.

== See also ==
- List of villages in India
