= Chak Bhagtupur =

Coordinates: 31°44′N 75°23′E

- Village
- Interactive map of Chak Bhagtupur
- Country: India
- State: Punjab
- District: Gurdaspur
- Tehsil: Batala
- Region: Majha

Government
  - Type: Panchayat raj
  - Body: Gram panchayat

Population (2011)
  - Total: 67
  - Total Households: 13
- Sex ratio 33/34 ♂/♀

Languages
  - Official: Punjabi
- Time zone: UTC+5:30 (IST)
- Telephone: 01871
- ISO 3166 code: IN-PB
- Vehicle registration: PB-18
- Website: gurdaspur.nic.in

Chak Bhagtupur is a village in Batala in Gurdaspur district of Punjab State, India. The village is administrated by Sarpanch.

== Demography ==
As of 2011, the village has a total number of 13 houses and a population of 67 of which 33 are males while 34 are females according to the report published by Census India in 2011. The literacy rate of the village is 73.33%, lower than the state average of 75.84%. The population of children under the age of 6 years is 3 which is 4.48% of total population of the village, and child sex ratio is approximately 0 lower than the state average of 846.

== See also ==
- List of villages in India
