= Khokhowal =

Village in Punjab State, India

Coordinates: 31°37′N 75°24′E

- Village
- Interactive map of Khokhowal
- Country: India
- State: Punjab
- District: Gurdaspur
- Tehsil: Batala
- Region: Majha

Government
  - Type: Panchayat raj
  - Body: Gram panchayat

Area
  - Total: 200 ha (490 acres)

Population (2011)
  - Total: 221; 121/100 ♂/♀
  - Scheduled Castes: 0; 0/0 ♂/♀
  - Total Households: 41

Languages
  - Official: Punjabi
- Time zone: UTC+5:30 (IST)
- Telephone: 01871
- ISO 3166 code: IN-PB
- Vehicle registration: PB-18
- Website: gurdaspur.nic.in

Khokhowal is a village in Batala in Gurdaspur district of Punjab State, India. It is located 32 kilometres (20 mi) from sub district headquarter, 80 kilometres (50 mi) from district headquarter and 17 kilometres (11 mi) from Sri Hargobindpur. The village is administrated by Sarpanch an elected representative of the village.

== Demography ==
As of 2011, the village has a total number of 41 houses and a population of 221 of which 121 are males while 100 are females. According to the report published by Census India in 2011, out of the total population of the village 0 people are from Schedule Caste and the village does not have any Schedule Tribe population so far.

== See also ==
- List of villages in India
