= Chak Chao =

- Village
- Country: India
- State: Punjab
- District: Gurdaspur
- Tehsil: Batala
- Region: Majha

Government
  - Type: Panchayat raj
  - Body: Gram panchayat

Population (2011)
  - Total: 670
  - Total Households: 163
- Sex ratio 342/328 ♂/♀

Languages
  - Official: Punjabi
- Time zone: UTC+5:30 (IST)
- Telephone: 01871
- ISO 3166 code: IN-PB
- Vehicle registration: PB-18
- Website: gurdaspur.nic.in

Chak Chao is a village in Batala in Gurdaspur district of Punjab State, India. The village is administered by sarpanch, an elected representative of the village.

== Demography ==
As of 2011, the village had 163 houses and a population of 670, of which 342 were male and while 328 were female. The literacy rate of the village was 91.75%, higher than the state average of 75.84%. The population of children under the age of 6 years was 56 (8.36% of total population of the village).

== See also ==
- List of villages in India
