= Sarwali =

- Village
- Country: India
- State: Punjab
- District: Gurdaspur
- Tehsil: Batala
- Region: Majha

Government
  - Type: Panchayat Raj
  - Body: Gram Panchayat

Area
  - Total: 311 ha (770 acres)

Population (2011)
  - Total: 1,987; 1,034/953 ♂/♀
  - Scheduled Castes: 112; 61/51 ♂/♀
  - Total Households: 387

Languages
  - Official: Punjabi
- Time zone: UTC+5:30 (IST)
- Telephone: 01871
- ISO 3166 code: IN-PB
- Vehicle registration: PB-18
- Website: gurdaspur.nic.in

Sarwali is a village in Batala in Gurdaspur district of Punjab State, India. It is located 14 kilometres (8.7 mi) from sub district headquarter, 46 kilometres (29 mi) from district headquarter and 14 kilometres (8.7 mi) from Sri Hargobindpur. The village is administered by Sarpanch an elected representative of the village. This village is birthplace of Punjabi singer Pav Dharia.

== Demography ==
As of 2011, the village has a total number of 387 houses and a population of 1987 of which 1034 are males while 953 are females. According to the report published by Census India in 2011, out of the total population of the village 112 people are from Schedule Caste and the village does not have any Schedule Tribe population so far.

== See also ==
- List of villages in India
