= Nathwal =

- Village
- Country: India
- State: Punjab
- District: Gurdaspur
- Tehsil: Batala
- Region: Majha

Government
  - Type: Panchayat raj
  - Body: Gram panchayat

Area
  - Total: 186 ha (460 acres)

Population (2011)
  - Total: 1,155; 602/553 ♂/♀
  - Scheduled Castes: 470; 244/226 ♂/♀
  - Total Households: 215

Languages
  - Official: Punjabi
- Time zone: UTC+5:30 (IST)
- Telephone: 01871
- ISO 3166 code: IN-PB
- Vehicle registration: PB-18
- Website: gurdaspur.nic.in

Nathwal is a village in Batala in Gurdaspur district of Punjab State, India. It is located 5 kilometres (3.1 mi) from sub district headquarter, 34 kilometres (21 mi) from district headquarter and 4 kilometres (2.5 mi) from Sri Hargobindpur. The village is administrated by Sarpanch an elected representative of the village.

== Demography ==
As of 2011, the village has a total number of 215 houses and a population of 1155 of which 602 are males while 553 are females. According to the report published by Census India in 2011, out of the total population of the village 470 people are from Schedule Caste and the village does not have any Schedule Tribe population so far.

== See also ==
- List of villages in India
