= Pind Purana =

- Village
- Country: India
- State: Punjab
- District: Gurdaspur
- Tehsil: Batala
- Region: Majha

Government
  - Type: Panchayat raj
  - Body: Gram panchayat

Area
  - Total: 246 ha (610 acres)

Population (2011)
  - Total: 1,439; 762/677 ♂/♀
  - Scheduled Castes: 395; 205/190 ♂/♀
  - Total Households: 263

Languages
  - Official: Punjabi
- Time zone: UTC+5:30 (IST)
- Telephone: 01871
- ISO 3166 code: IN-PB
- Vehicle registration: PB-18
- Website: gurdaspur.nic.in

Pind Purana is a village in Batala in Gurdaspur district of Punjab State, India. It is located 8 kilometres (5.0 mi) from sub district headquarter, 37 kilometres (23 mi) from district headquarter and 4 kilometres (2.5 mi) from Sri Hargobindpur. The village is administrated by Sarpanch an elected representative of the village.

== Demography ==
As of 2011, the village has a total number of 263 houses and a population of 1439 of which 762 are males while 677 are females. According to the report published by Census India in 2011, out of the total population of the village 395 people are from Schedule Caste and the village does not have any Schedule Tribe population so far.

== See also ==
- List of villages in India
