= Balarwal =

Coordinates: 31.639°N 75.418°E

- Village
- Interactive map of Balarwal
- Country: India
- State: Punjab
- District: Gurdaspur
- Tehsil: Batala
- Region: Majha

Government
  - Type: Panchayat raj
  - Body: Gram panchayat

Languages
  - Official: Punjabi
- Time zone: UTC+5:30 (IST)
- Telephone: 01871
- ISO 3166 code: IN-PB
- Vehicle registration: PB-18
- Website: gurdaspur.nic.in

Balarwal is a village in Batala in Gurdaspur district of Punjab State, India. The village is administrated by Sarpanch an elected representative of the village. Ballarwal situated near Biswas river, Ballarwal was only one village before and now one more new village emerged from Ballarwal called new Ballarwal or Chak Cho. Ballarwal Purna (old) has population nearly about 1000 to 1300 with around 200 to 300 homes.

== See also ==
- List of villages in India
