= Talwandi Jhunglan =

- Village
- Country: India
- State: Punjab
- District: Gurdaspur
- Tehsil: Batala
- Region: Majha

Government
  - Type: Panchayat raj
  - Body: Gram panchayat

Area
  - Total: 443 ha (1,090 acres)

Population (2011)
  - Total: 1,718; 918/800 ♂/♀
  - Scheduled Castes: 621; 335/286 ♂/♀
  - Total Households: 335

Languages
  - Official: Punjabi
- Time zone: UTC+5:30 (IST)
- Telephone: 01871
- ISO 3166 code: IN-PB
- Vehicle registration: PB-18
- Website: gurdaspur.nic.in

Talwandi Jhunglan is a village in Batala in Gurdaspur district of Punjab State, India. It is located 11 kilometres (6.8 mi) from sub district headquarter, 30 kilometres (19 mi) from district headquarter and 11 kilometres (6.8 mi) from Sri Hargobindpur. The village is administrated by Sarpanch an elected representative of the village.

== Demography ==
As of 2011, the village has a total number of 335 houses and a population of 1718 of which 918 are males while 800 are females. According to the report published by Census India in 2011, out of the total population of the village 621 people are from Schedule Caste and the village does not have any Schedule Tribe population so far.

== See also ==
- List of villages in India
