= Mehmedpur =

- Village
- Country: India
- State: Punjab
- District: Gurdaspur
- Tehsil: Batala
- Region: Majha

Government
  - Type: Panchayat raj
  - Body: Gram panchayat

Area
  - Total: 132 ha (330 acres)

Population (2011)
  - Total: 418; 215/203 ♂/♀
  - Scheduled Castes: 117; 59/58 ♂/♀
  - Total Households: 82

Languages
  - Official: Punjabi
- Time zone: UTC+5:30 (IST)
- Telephone: 01871
- ISO 3166 code: IN-PB
- Vehicle registration: PB-18
- Website: gurdaspur.nic.in

Mehmedpur is a village in Batala in Gurdaspur district of Punjab State, India. It is located 26 kilometres (16 mi) from sub district headquarter, 54 kilometres (34 mi) from district headquarter and 20 kilometres (12 mi) from Sri Hargobindpur. The village is administrated by Sarpanch an elected representative of the village.

== Demography ==
As of 2011, the village has a total number of 82 houses and a population of 418 of which 215 are males while 203 are females. According to the report published by Census India in 2011, out of the total population of the village 117 people are from Schedule Caste and the village does not have any Schedule Tribe population so far.

== See also ==
- List of villages in India
