= Missarpura =

- Village
- Country: India
- State: Punjab
- District: Gurdaspur
- Tehsil: Batala
- Region: Majha

Government
  - Type: Panchayat raj
  - Body: Gram panchayat

Area
  - Total: 238 ha (590 acres)

Population (2011)
  - Total: 1,717; 906/811 ♂/♀
  - Scheduled Castes: 798; 422/376 ♂/♀
  - Total Households: 337

Languages
  - Official: Punjabi
- Time zone: UTC+5:30 (IST)
- Telephone: 01871
- ISO 3166 code: IN-PB
- Vehicle registration: PB-18
- Website: gurdaspur.nic.in

Missarpura is a village in Batala in Gurdaspur district of Punjab State, India. It is located 3 kilometres (1.9 mi) from sub district headquarter, 35 kilometres (22 mi) from district headquarter and 2 kilometres (1.2 mi) from Sri Hargobindpur. The village is administrated by Sarpanch an elected representative of the village.

== Demography ==
As of 2011, the village had a total number of 337 houses and a population of 1717; 906 of which are males while 811 are females. According to the report published by Census India in 2011, out of the total population of the village 798 people are from Schedule Caste and the village does not have any Schedule Tribe population so far.

== See also ==
- List of villages in India
