= Talwandi Bha-rath =

- Village
- Country: India
- State: Punjab
- District: Gurdaspur
- Tehsil: Batala
- Region: Majha

Government
  - Type: Panchayat raj
  - Body: Gram panchayat

Area
  - Total: 213 ha (530 acres)

Population (2011)
  - Total: 3,150; 1,666/1,484 ♂/♀
  - Scheduled Castes: 1,340; 701/639 ♂/♀
  - Total Households: 583

Languages
  - Official: Punjabi
- Time zone: UTC+5:30 (IST)
- Telephone: 01871
- ISO 3166 code: IN-PB
- Vehicle registration: PB-18
- Website: gurdaspur.nic.in

Talwandi Bha-rath is a village in Batala in Gurdaspur district of Punjab State, India. It is located 12 kilometres (7.5 mi) from sub district headquarter, 40 kilometres (25 mi) from district headquarter and 10 kilometres (6.2 mi) from Sri Hargobindpur. The village is administrated by the Sarpanch.

== Demography ==
As of 2011, the village has a total number of 583 houses and a population of 3150 of which 1666 are males while 1484 are females. According to the report published by Census India in 2011, out of the total population of the village 1340 people are from Schedule Caste and the village does not have any Schedule Tribe population so far.

== See also ==
- List of villages in India
