= Sokala =

- Village
- Country: India
- State: Punjab
- District: Gurdaspur
- Tehsil: Batala
- Region: Majha

Government
  - Type: Panchayat raj
  - Body: Gram panchayat

Area
  - Total: 386 ha (950 acres)

Population (2011)
  - Total: 1,486; 765/721 ♂/♀
  - Scheduled Castes: 185; 95/90 ♂/♀
  - Total Households: 270

Languages
  - Official: Punjabi
- Time zone: UTC+5:30 (IST)
- Telephone: 01871
- ISO 3166 code: IN-PB
- Vehicle registration: PB-18
- Website: gurdaspur.nic.in

Sokala is a village in Batala in Gurdaspur district of Punjab State, India. It is located 33 kilometres (21 mi) from sub district headquarter, 60 kilometres (37 mi) from district headquarter and 4 kilometres (2.5 mi) from Sri Hargobindpur. The village is administrated by Sarpanch an elected representative of the village.

== Demography ==
As of 2011, the village has a total number of 270 houses and a population of 1486 of which 765 are males while 721 are females. According to the report published by Census India in 2011, out of the total population of the village 185 people are from Schedule Caste and the village does not have any Schedule Tribe population so far.

== See also ==
- List of villages in India
