= Sham Sherpur =

- Village
- Country: India
- State: Punjab
- District: Gurdaspur
- Tehsil: Batala
- Region: Majha

Government
  - Type: Panchayat raj
  - Body: Gram panchayat

Area
  - Total: 136 ha (340 acres)

Population (2011)
  - Total: 2,558; 1,325/1,233 ♂/♀
  - Scheduled Castes: 1,553; 798/755 ♂/♀
  - Total Households: 477

Languages
  - Official: Punjabi
- Time zone: UTC+5:30 (IST)
- Telephone: 01871
- ISO 3166 code: IN-PB
- Vehicle registration: PB-06
- Website: gurdaspur.nic.in

Sham Sherpur is a village in Batala in Gurdaspur district of Punjab State, India. Popular name of this village is Chittorgarh. It is located 25 kilometres (16 mi) from sub district headquarter(Batala), 60 kilometres (37 mi) from district headquarter(Gurdaspur). The village is administrated by Sarpanch an elected representative of the village. Sarpanch's name Harkawalpreet Singh Mobile number +919878266631

== Demography ==
As of 2011, the village has a total number of 477 houses and a population of 2558 of which 1325 are males while 1233 are females. According to the report published by Census India in 2011, out of the total population of the village 1553 people are from Schedule Caste and the village does not have any Schedule Tribe population so far.

== See also ==
- List of villages in India
