= Meekey =

- Village
- Country: India
- State: Punjab
- District: Gurdaspur
- Tehsil: Batala
- Region: Majha

Government
  - Type: Panchayat raj
  - Body: Gram panchayat

Area
  - Total: 218 ha (540 acres)

Population (2011)
  - Total: 1,285; 690/595 ♂/♀
  - Scheduled Castes: 282; 149/133 ♂/♀
  - Total Households: 221

Languages
  - Official: Punjabi
- Time zone: UTC+5:30 (IST)
- Telephone: 01871
- ISO 3166 code: IN-PB
- Vehicle registration: PB-18
- Website: gurdaspur.nic.in

Meekey is a village in Batala in Gurdaspur district of Punjab State, India. It is located 24 kilometres (15 mi) from sub district headquarter, 54 kilometres (34 mi) from district headquarter and 16 kilometres (9.9 mi) from Sri Hargobindpur. The village is administrated by Sarpanch an elected representative of the village.

== Demography ==
As of 2011, the village has a total number of 221 houses and a population of 1285 of which 690 are males while 595 are females. According to the report published by Census India in 2011, out of the total population of the village 282 people are from Schedule Caste and the village does not have any Schedule Tribe population so far.

== See also ==
- List of villages in India
