= Sarupwali =

Coordinates: 31°46′N 75°08′E

- Village
- Interactive map of Sarupwali
- Country: India
- State: Punjab
- District: Gurdaspur
- Tehsil: Batala
- Region: Majha

Government
  - Type: Panchayat raj
  - Body: Gram panchayat

Area
  - Total: 300 ha (740 acres)

Population (2011)
  - Total: 2,294; 1,227/1,067 ♂/♀
  - Scheduled Castes: 569; 307/262 ♂/♀
  - Total Households: 420

Languages
  - Official: Punjabi
- Time zone: UTC+5:30 (IST)
- Telephone: 01871
- ISO 3166 code: IN-PB
- Vehicle registration: PB-18
- Website: gurdaspur.nic.in

Sarupwali is a village in Batala in Gurdaspur district of Punjab State, India. It is located 8 kilometres (5.0 mi) from sub district headquarter, 38 kilometres (24 mi) from district headquarter and 10 kilometres (6.2 mi) from Sri Hargobindpur. The village is administrated by Sarpanch an elected representative of the village.

== Demography ==
As of 2011, the village has a total number of 420 houses and a population of 2294 of which 1227 are males while 1067 are females. According to the report published by Census India in 2011, out of the total population of the village 569 people are from Schedule Caste and the village does not have any Schedule Tribe population so far.

== See also ==
- List of villages in India
