= Kazampur =

- Village
- Country: India
- State: Punjab
- District: Gurdaspur
- Tehsil: Batala
- Region: Majha

Government
  - Type: Panchayat raj
  - Body: Gram panchayat

Area
  - Total: 123 ha (300 acres)

Population (2011)
  - Total: 834; 449/385 ♂/♀
  - Scheduled Castes: 440; 242/198 ♂/♀
  - Total Households: 160

Languages
  - Official: Punjabi
- Time zone: UTC+5:30 (IST)
- Telephone: 01871
- ISO 3166 code: IN-PB
- Vehicle registration: PB-18
- Website: gurdaspur.nic.in

Kazampur is a village in Batala in Gurdaspur district of Punjab State, India. It is located 17 kilometres (11 mi) from sub district headquarter, 51 kilometres (32 mi) from district headquarter and 13 kilometres (8.1 mi) from Sri Hargobindpur. The village is administrated by Sarpanch an elected representative of the village.

== Demography ==
As of 2011, the village has a total number of 160 houses and a population of 834 of which 449 are males while 385 are females. According to the report published by Census India in 2011, out of the total population of the village 440 people are from Schedule Caste and the village does not have any Schedule Tribe population so far.

== See also ==
- List of villages in India
