= Pinda Rori =

- Village
- Country: India
- State: Punjab
- District: Gurdaspur
- Tehsil: Batala
- Region: Majha

Government
  - Type: Panchayat raj
  - Body: Gram panchayat

Area
  - Total: 118 ha (290 acres)

Population (2011)
  - Total: 526; 286/240 ♂/♀
  - Scheduled Castes: 49; 27/22 ♂/♀
  - Total Households: 105

Languages
  - Official: Punjabi
- Time zone: UTC+5:30 (IST)
- Telephone: 01871
- ISO 3166 code: IN-PB
- Vehicle registration: PB-18
- Website: gurdaspur.nic.in

Pinda Rori is a village in Batala in Gurdaspur district of Punjab State, India. It is located 30 kilometres (19 mi) from sub district headquarter, 32 kilometres (20 mi) from district headquarter and 12 kilometres (7.5 mi) from Sri Hargobindpur. The village is administrated by Sarpanch an elected representative of the village.

== Demography ==
As of 2011, the village has a total number of 105 houses and a population of 526 of which 286 are males while 240 are females. According to the report published by Census India in 2011, out of the total population of the village 49 people are from Schedule Caste and the village does not have any Schedule Tribe population so far.

== See also ==
- List of villages in India
