= Phulke =

Coordinates: 31°46′N 75°13′E

- Village
- Interactive map of Phulke
- Country: India
- State: Punjab
- District: Gurdaspur
- Tehsil: Batala
- Region: Majha

Government
  - Type: Panchayat raj
  - Body: Gram panchayat

Area
  - Total: 147 ha (360 acres)

Population (2011)
  - Total: 1,034; 524/510 ♂/♀
  - Scheduled Castes: 426; 216/210 ♂/♀
  - Total Households: 206

Languages
  - Official: Punjabi
- Time zone: UTC+5:30 (IST)
- Telephone: 01871
- ISO 3166 code: IN-PB
- Vehicle registration: PB-18
- Website: gurdaspur.nic.in

Phulke is a village in Batala in Gurdaspur district of Punjab State, India. It is located 10 kilometres (6.2 mi) from sub district headquarter, 45 kilometres (28 mi) from district headquarter and 3 kilometres (1.9 mi) from Sri Hargobindpur. The village is administrated by Sarpanch an elected representative of the village.

== Demography ==
As of 2011, the village has a total number of 206 houses and a population of 1034 of which 524 are males while 510 are females. According to the report published by Census India in 2011, out of the total population of the village 426 people are from Schedule Caste and the village does not have any Schedule Tribe population so far.

== See also ==
- List of villages in India
