= Nangal Jhawar =

Nangal Jhour
- Village
- Country: India
- State: Punjab
- District: Gurdaspur
- Tehsil: Batala
- Region: Majha

Government
  - Type: Panchayat raj
  - Body: Gram panchayat

Area
  - Total: 367 ha (910 acres)

Population (2011)
  - Total: 1,455; 755/700 ♂/♀
  - Scheduled Castes: 64; 35/29 ♂/♀
  - Total Households: 284

Languages
  - Official: Punjabi
- Time zone: UTC+5:30 (IST)
- Telephone: 01871
- ISO 3166 code: IN-PB
- Vehicle registration: PB-18
- Website: gurdaspur.nic.in

Nangal Jhour is a village in Batala in Gurdaspur district of Punjab State, India. It is located 28 kilometres (17 mi) from sub district headquarter, 40 kilometres (25 mi) from district headquarter and 7 kilometres (4.3 mi) from Sri Hargobindpur. The village is administrated by Sarpanch an elected representative of the village.

== Demography ==
As of 2011, the village has a total number of 284 houses and the population of 1455 of which 755 are males while 700 are females. According to the report published by Census India in 2011, out of the total population of the village 64 people are from Schedule Caste and the village does not have any Schedule Tribe population so far.

== See also ==
- List of villages in India
