= Rupowali =

Coordinates: 31°56′N 75°01′E

- Village
- Interactive map of Rupowali
- Country: India
- State: Punjab
- District: Gurdaspur
- Tehsil: Batala
- Region: Majha

Government
  - Type: Panchayat raj
  - Body: Gram panchayat

Area
  - Total: 260 ha (640 acres)

Population (2011)
  - Total: 988; 534/454 ♂/♀
  - Scheduled Castes: 67; 38/29 ♂/♀
  - Total Households: 155

Languages
  - Official: Punjabi
- Time zone: UTC+5:30 (IST)
- Telephone: 01871
- ISO 3166 code: IN-PB
- Vehicle registration: PB-18
- Website: gurdaspur.nic.in

Rupowali is a village in Batala in Gurdaspur district of Punjab State, India. It is located 30 kilometres (19 mi) from sub district headquarter, 65 kilometres (40 mi) from district headquarter and 16 kilometres (9.9 mi) from Sri Hargobindpur. The village is administrated by Sarpanch an elected representative of the village.

== Demography ==
As of 2011, the village has a total number of 155 houses and a population of 988 of which 534 are males while 454 are females. According to the report published by Census India in 2011, out of the total population of the village 67 people are from Schedule Caste and the village does not have any Schedule Tribe population so far.

== See also ==
- List of villages in India
