= Chak Tara =

- Village
- Interactive map of Chak Tara
- Coordinates: 31°45′20.75″N 75°17′55.18″E
- Country: India
- State: Punjab
- District: Gurdaspur
- Tehsil: Batala
- Region: Majha

Government
  - Type: Panchayat raj
  - Body: Gram panchayat

Population (2011)
  - Total: 418
  - Total Households: 84
- Sex ratio 230/188 ♂/♀

Languages
  - Official: Punjabi
- Time zone: UTC+5:30 (IST)
- Telephone: 01871
- ISO 3166 code: IN-PB
- Vehicle registration: PB-18
- Website: gurdaspur.nic.in

Chak Tara is a village in Batala in Gurdaspur district of Punjab State, India. The village is administrated by Sarpanch an elected representative of the village.

== Demography ==
As of 2011, the village has a total number of 84 houses and the population of 418 of which 230 are males while 188 are females according to the report published by Census India in 2011. The literacy rate of the village is 92.90%, highest than the state average of 75.84%. The population of children under the age of 6 years is 66 which is 15.79% of total population of the village, and child sex ratio is approximately 404 lower than the state average of 846.

== See also ==
- List of villages in India
