= Winjwan =

Coordinates: 31°52′N 75°12′E

- Village
- Interactive map of Winjwan
- Country: India
- State: Punjab
- District: Gurdaspur
- Tehsil: Batala
- Region: Majha

Government
  - Type: Panchayat raj
  - Body: Gram panchayat

Area
  - Total: 221 ha (550 acres)

Population (2011)
  - Total: 1,460; 767/693 ♂/♀
  - Scheduled Castes: 487; 239/248 ♂/♀
  - Total Households: 273

Languages
  - Official: Punjabi
- Time zone: UTC+5:30 (IST)
- Telephone: 01871
- ISO 3166 code: IN-PB
- Vehicle registration: PB-18
- Website: gurdaspur.nic.in

Winjwan is a village in Batala in Gurdaspur district of Punjab State, India. It is located 8 kilometres (5.0 mi) from sub district headquarter, 37 kilometres (23 mi) from district headquarter . The village is administrated by Sarpanch an elected representative of the village.

== Demography ==
As of 2011, the village has a total number of 273 houses and a population of 1460 of which 767 are males while 693 are females. According to the report published by Census India in 2011, out of the total population of the village 487 people are from Schedule Caste and the village does not have any Schedule Tribe population so far.

== See also ==
- List of villages in India
