= Kastiwal =

- Village
- Location within Punjab Location within India
- Coordinates: 31°51′N 75°07′E
- Country: India
- State: Punjab
- District: Gurdaspur
- Tehsil: Batala
- Region: Majha

Government
  - Type: Panchayat raj
  - Body: Gram panchayat

Area
  - Total: 410 ha (1,000 acres)

Population (2011)
  - Total: 1,535; 805/730 ♂/♀
  - Scheduled Castes: 193; 105/88 ♂/♀
  - Total Households: 294

Languages
  - Official: Punjabi
- Time zone: UTC+5:30 (IST)
- Telephone: 01871
- ISO 3166 code: IN-PB
- Vehicle registration: PB-18
- Website: gurdaspur.nic.in

Kastiwal is a village in Batala in Gurdaspur district of Punjab State, India. It is located 12 kilometres (7.5 mi) from the sub district headquarter, 40 kilometres (25 mi) from the district headquarter, and 8 kilometres (5.0 mi) from Sri Hargobindpur. The village is administrated by a sarpanch, an elected representative of the village.

== Demography ==
As of 2011, the village has a total number of 294 houses and a population of 1535, of which 805 are male and 730 are female. According to the report published by Census India in 2011, of the total population of the village, 193 people are from Schedule Caste; the village does not have any Schedule Tribe population so far.

== See also ==
- List of villages in India
