= Udhanwal =

- Village
- Country: India
- State: Punjab
- District: Gurdaspur
- Tehsil: Batala
- Region: Majha

Government
  - Type: Panchayat raj
  - Body: Gram panchayat

Area
  - Total: 100 ha (250 acres)

Population (2011)
  - Total: 2,088; 1,069/1,019 ♂/♀
  - Scheduled Castes: 829; 431/398 ♂/♀
  - Total households: 368

Languages
  - Official: Punjabi
- Time zone: UTC+5:30 (IST)
- Telephone: 01871
- ISO 3166 code: IN-PB
- Vehicle registration: PB-18
- Website: gurdaspur.nic.in

Udhanwal is a village in Batala in Gurdaspur district of Majha Punjab state, India. Udhanwal is re-setup on the "THAE" by a Sikh sardar of Kalsi caste and he was also Ramgharia Risaldar in Sikh Khalsa Army of Maharaja Ranjeet Singh. Prior he was the resident of village Dhandoi near Batala. He re-setup his own new village Udhanwal along with another forty families of Sikh faith specially Kalsi peoples from the nearby villages of the Majha belt of panjab just before the death of Sher-e-panjab Maharaja Ranjeet Singh. It is located 21 kilometres (13 mi) from sub district headquarters, 45 kilometres (28 mi) from district headquarters and 12 kilometres (7.5 mi) from Sri Hargobindpur. The village is administrated by Sarpanch an elected representative of the village.

== Demography ==
As of 2011, the village had 368 houses and a population of 2088 of which 1069 were males while 1019 were females. According to the report published by Census India in 2011, 829 are from Schedule Caste and the village has no Schedule Tribe population.

== See also ==
- List of villages in India
