= Attepur =

- Village
- Interactive map of Attepur
- Coordinates: 31°43′09.85″N 75°21′48.16″E
- Country: India
- State: Punjab
- District: Gurdaspur
- Tehsil: Batala
- Region: Majha

Government
  - Type: Panchayat raj
  - Body: Gram panchayat

Languages
  - Official: Punjabi
- Time zone: UTC+5:30 (IST)
- Telephone: 01871
- ISO 3166 code: IN-PB
- Vehicle registration: PB-18
- Website: gurdaspur.nic.in

Attepur is a village in Batala in Gurdaspur district of Punjab State, India. The village is administrated by Sarpanch, an elected representative of the village.

== See also ==
- List of villages in India
