= Riali Kalan =

Village in Punjab, India

Riali Khurd & Kalan Raliali
- Village
- Interactive map of Riali Khurd & Kalan
- Coordinates: 31.810386°N 75.083485°E
- Country: India
- State: Punjab
- District: Gurdaspur
- Mandal: Pathankot
- Postal code: 143507

Riali Khurd & Kalan is a village situated in the mandal (or tehsil) Pathankot, in the Gurdaspur district, Punjab, India, near Batala. There are almost 9 Gurudwara Sahib Ji in the village. There are two higher education institutions in this village, Guru Ram Das Academy, Riali Kalan and Government Senior Secondary School. Notable people from this village include Joga Singh

== Demographics ==
According to the 2011 Census of India, Riali Khurd & Kalan has a population of 1,063 people living in approximately 210 families.
