= Nangal Buttar =

Nangal Buttar Buche Nangal
- Village
- Country: India
- State: Punjab
- District: Gurdaspur
- Tehsil: Batala
- Region: Majha

Government
  - Type: Panchayat raj
  - Body: Gram panchayat

Area
  - Total: 202 ha (500 acres)

Population (2011)
  - Total: 1,047; 540/507 ♂/♀
  - Density: 2/km^{2} (5.2/sq mi)
  - Scheduled Castes: 478; 249/229 ♂/♀
  - Total Households: 221

Languages
  - Official: Punjabi
- Time zone: UTC+5:30 (IST)
- Telephone: 01871
- ISO 3166 code: IN-PB
- Vehicle registration: PB-18
- Website: gurdaspur.nic.in

Nangal Buttar is a village in Batala in Gurdaspur district of Punjab State, India. It is located 10 kilometres (6.2 mi) from sub district headquarter, 40 kilometres (25 mi) from district headquarter and 7 kilometres (4.3 mi) from Sri Hargobindpur. The village is administrated by Sarpanch, an elected representative of the village.

== Demography ==
As of 2011, the village has a total number of 221 houses and a population of 1047, of which 540 are males and 507 are females. According to the report published by Census India in 2011, out of the total population of the village 478 people are from Schedule Caste and the village does not have any Schedule Tribe population so far.

== See also ==
- List of villages in India
