= Bhamboi =

Coordinates: 31°44′N 75°17′E

- Village
- Interactive map of Bhamboi
- Country: India
- State: Punjab
- District: Gurdaspur
- Tehsil: Batala
- Region: Majha

Government
  - Type: Panchayat raj
  - Body: Gram panchayat

Languages
  - Official: Punjabi
- Time zone: UTC+5:30 (IST)
- Telephone: 01871
- ISO 3166 code: IN-PB
- Vehicle registration: PB-18
- Website: gurdaspur.nic.in

Bhamboi is a village in Batala in Gurdaspur district of Punjab State, India. The village is administrated by an elected representative of the village known as a Sarpanch.

== See also ==
- List of villages in India
