= Nawan Pind Milkhi-wala =

- Village
- Country: India
- State: Punjab
- District: Gurdaspur
- Tehsil: Batala
- Region: Majha

Government
  - Type: Panchayat raj
  - Body: Gram panchayat

Area
  - Total: 76 ha (190 acres)

Population (2011)
  - Total: 751; 383/368 ♂/♀
  - Scheduled Castes: 195; 96/99 ♂/♀
  - Total Households: 137

Languages
  - Official: Punjabi
- Time zone: UTC+5:30 (IST)
- Telephone: 01871
- ISO 3166 code: IN-PB
- Vehicle registration: PB-18
- Website: gurdaspur.nic.in

Nawan Pind Milkhi-wala is a village situated in Batala, Gurdaspur district of Punjab State, India. It is located 9 kilometres (5.6 mi) from sub district headquarter, 47 kilometres (29 mi) from district headquarter and 9 kilometres (5.6 mi) from Sri Hargobindpur. The village is administrated by Sarpanch an elected representative of the village.

== Demography ==
As of 2011, the village has a total number of 137 houses and a population of 751 of which 383 are males while 368 are females. According to the report published by Census India in 2011, out of the total population of the village 195 people are from Schedule Caste and the village does not have any Schedule Tribe population so far.

== See also ==
- List of villages in India
