= Bhadur Hussain =

- Village
- Interactive map of Bhadur Hussain
- Coordinates: 31°47′22.63″N 75°13′54.01″E
- Country: India
- State: Punjab
- District: Gurdaspur
- Tehsil: Batala
- Region: Majha

Government
  - Type: Panchayat raj
  - Body: Salkhan singh

Population (2011)
  - Total: 2,209
  - Total Households: 402
- Sex ratio 1196/1013 ♂/♀

Languages
  - Official: Punjabi
- Time zone: UTC+5:30 (IST)
- 143506: 143506
- Telephone: 01871
- ISO 3166 code: IN-PB
- Vehicle registration: PB-18
- Website: gurdaspur.nic.in

Bhadur Hussain is a village in Batala in Gurdaspur district of Punjab State, India. The village is administrated by Sarpanch an elected representative of the village. Mrs Jaspinder Kaur is currently serving as Sarpanch. Sikhism is the Religion followed by large number of population in the village, Meanwhile, Gurudwara Sant Baba Bhuri Wale Ji is situated here. On 30th September (15 ਅੱਸੂ) every year a people celebrate memories of Sant Baba Bhuri Wale Ji. It is a Govt Middle School & Rural Dispensary for good Knowledge and better Health.

== Demography ==
As of 2011, the village has a total number of 402 houses and a population of 2209 of which 1196 are males while 1013 are females according to the report published by Census India in 2011. The literacy rate of the village is 75.87%, highest than the state average of 75.84%. The population of children under the age of 6 years is 274 which is 12.40% of total population of the village, and child sex ratio is approximately 734 lower than the state average of 846.

== See also ==
- List of villages in India
