= Bhole Ke =

- Village
- Location within Punjab
- Coordinates: 31.920°N 75.011°E
- Country: India
- State: Punjab
- District: Gurdaspur
- Tehsil: Batala
- Region: Majha

Government
  - Type: Panchayat raj
  - Body: Gram panchayat

Area
  - Total: 271 ha (670 acres)

Population (2011)
  - Total: 1,739; 937/802 ♂/♀
  - Scheduled Castes: 515; 284/231 ♂/♀
  - Total Households: 317

Languages
  - Official: Punjabi
- Time zone: UTC+5:30 (IST)
- Telephone: 01871
- ISO 3166 code: IN-PB
- Vehicle registration: PB-18
- Website: gurdaspur.nic.in

Bhole Ke is a village in Batala in Gurdaspur district of Punjab State, India. The village is administrated by Sarpanch an elected representative of the village.

== Demography ==
As of 2011, the village has a total number of 317 houses and a population of 1739 of which 937 are males while 802 are females. According to the report published by Census India in 2011, out of the total population of the village 515 people are from Schedule Caste and the village does not have any Schedule Tribe population so far.

== See also ==
- List of villages in India
