= Sangherah =

- Village
- Country: India
- State: Punjab
- District: Gurdaspur
- Tehsil: Batala
- Region: Majha

Government
  - Type: Panchayat raj
  - Body: Gram panchayat

Area
  - Total: 158 ha (390 acres)

Population (2011)
  - Total: 945; 486/459 ♂/♀
  - Scheduled Castes: 348; 174/174 ♂/♀
  - Total Households: 196

Languages
  - Official: Punjabi
- Time zone: UTC+5:30 (IST)
- Telephone: 01871
- ISO 3166 code: IN-PB
- Vehicle registration: PB-18
- Website: gurdaspur.nic.in

Sangherah is a village in Batala in Gurdaspur district of Punjab State, India. It is located 19 kilometres (12 mi) from sub district headquarter, 47 kilometres (29 mi) from district headquarter and 19 kilometres (12 mi) from Sri Hargobindpur. The village is administrated by Sarpanch an elected representative of the village.

== Demography ==
As of 2011, the village has a total number of 196 houses and a population of 945 of which 486 are males while 459 are females. According to the report published by Census India in 2011, out of the total population of the village 348 people are from Schedule Caste and the village does not have any Schedule Tribe population so far.

== See also ==
- List of villages in India
