= Nawan Pind Barqiwala =

- Village
- Country: India
- State: Punjab
- District: Gurdaspur
- Tehsil: Batala
- Region: Majha

Government
  - Type: Panchayat raj
  - Body: Gram panchayat

Area
  - Total: 76 ha (190 acres)

Population (2011)
  - Total: 395; 203/192 ♂/♀
  - Scheduled Castes: 0; 0/0 ♂/♀
  - Total Households: 84

Languages
  - Official: Punjabi
- Time zone: UTC+5:30 (IST)
- Telephone: 01871
- ISO 3166 code: IN-PB
- Vehicle registration: PB-18
- Website: gurdaspur.nic.in

Nawan Pind Barqiwala is a village in Batala in Gurdaspur district of Punjab State, India. It is located 13 kilometres (8.1 mi) from sub district headquarter, 43 kilometres (27 mi) from district headquarter and 10 kilometres (6.2 mi) from Sri Hargobindpur. The village is administrated by Sarpanch an elected representative of the village.

== Demography ==
As of 2011, the village has a total number of 84 houses and a population of 395 of which 203 are males while 192 are females. According to the report published by Census India in 2011, out of the total population of the village 0 people are from Schedule Caste and the village does not have any Schedule Tribe population so far.

== See also ==
- List of villages in India
