= Sheikhwan =

- Village
- Country: India
- State: Punjab
- District: Gurdaspur
- Tehsil: Batala
- Region: Majha

Government
  - Type: Panchayat raj
  - Body: Gram panchayat

Area
  - Total: 384 ha (950 acres)

Population (2011)
  - Total: 1,592; 841/751 ♂/♀
  - Scheduled Castes: 707; 375/332 ♂/♀
  - Total Households: 303

Languages
  - Official: Punjabi
- Time zone: UTC+5:30 (IST)
- Telephone: 01871
- ISO 3166 code: IN-PB
- Vehicle registration: PB-18
- Website: gurdaspur.nic.in

Sheikhwan is a village in Batala in Gurdaspur district of Punjab State, India. It is located 11 kilometres (6.8 mi) from sub district headquarter, 41 kilometres (25 mi) from district headquarter and 11 kilometres (6.8 mi) from Sri Hargobindpur. The village is administrated by Sarpanch an elected representative of the village.

== Demography ==
As of 2011, the village has a total number of 303 houses and a population of 1592 of which 841 are males while 751 are females. According to the report published by Census India in 2011, out of the total population of the village 707 people are from Schedule Caste and the village does not have any Schedule Tribe population so far.

== See also ==
- List of villages in India
