= Purian Khurd =

- Village
- Country: India
- State: Punjab
- District: Gurdaspur
- Tehsil: Batala
- Region: Majha

Government
  - Type: Panchayat raj
  - Body: Gram panchayat

Area
  - Total: 173 ha (430 acres)

Population (2011)
  - Total: 736; 388/348 ♂/♀
  - Scheduled Castes: 98; 55/43 ♂/♀
  - Total Households: 144

Languages
  - Official: Punjabi
- Time zone: UTC+5:30 (IST)
- Telephone: 01871
- ISO 3166 code: IN-PB
- Vehicle registration: PB-18
- Website: gurdaspur.nic.in

Purian Khurd is a village in Batala in Gurdaspur district of Punjab State, India. It is located 12 kilometres (7.5 mi) from sub district headquarter, 47 kilometres (29 mi) from district headquarter and 12 kilometres (7.5 mi) from Sri Hargobindpur. The village is administrated by Sarpanch an elected representative of the village.

== Demography ==
As of 2011, the village has a total number of 144 houses and a population of 736 of which 388 are males while 348 are females. According to the report published by Census India in 2011, out of the total population of the village 98 people are from Schedule Caste and the village does not have any Schedule Tribe population so far.

== See also ==
- List of villages in India
