= Raliali Khurd =

Riali Khurd Riali
- Village
- ਰਿਆਲੀ ਖੁਰਦ
- Location within India
- Coordinates: 31.8093670°N 75.0826170°E
- Country: India
- State: Punjab
- District: Gurdaspur
- Tehsil: Batala
- Region: Majha

Government
  - Type: Panchayat raj
  - Body: Gram panchayat

Area
  - Total: 183 ha (450 acres)

Population (2011)
  - Total: 1,063; 553/510 ♂/♀
  - Scheduled Castes: 355; 198/157 ♂/♀
  - Total Households: 191

Languages
  - Official: Punjabi
- Time zone: UTC+5:30 (IST)
- Postal code: 143507
- Telephone: 01871
- ISO 3166 code: IN-PB
- Vehicle registration: PB-18
- Website: gurdaspur.nic.in

Riali Khurd is a village in Batala in Gurdaspur district of Punjab State, India. It is located 22 kilometres (14 mi) from sub district headquarter, 45 kilometres (28 mi) from district headquarter and 13 kilometres (8.1 mi) from Sri Hargobindpur. The village is administrated by Sarpanch an elected representative of the village. The native language of Riali Khurd is Punjabi and most of the village people speak Punjabi. Riali Khurd people use Punjabi language for communication. Riali Khurd village is located in the UTC 5.30 time zone and it follows Indian standard Time (IST). Riali Khurd sun rise time varies 28 minutes from IST. The vehicle driving side in Riali Khurd is left, all vehicles should take left side during driving. Riali Khurd people are using its national currency which is Indian Rupee and its international currency code is INR. Riali Khurd phones and mobiles can be accessed by adding the Indian country dialing code +91 from abroad. Riali Khurd people are following the dd/mm/yyyy date format in day-to-day life. Riali Khurd domain name extension (country code top-level domain (cTLD)) is .in. The nearest railway station to Riali Khurd is Jaintipura.Riali Khurd's nearest airport is Sri Guru Ram Dass Jee International Airport situated at 28.7 km distance.

== Demography ==
As of 2011, the village has a total number of 191 houses and a population of 1063 of which 553 are males while 510 are females. According to the report published by Census India in 2011, out of the total population of the village 355 people are from Schedule Caste and the village does not have any Schedule Tribe population so far.

== See also ==
- List of villages in India
