= Seikhwan =

- Village
- Country: India
- State: Punjab
- District: Gurdaspur
- Tehsil: Batala
- Region: Majha

Government
  - Type: Panchayat raj
  - Body: Gram panchayat

Area
  - Total: 127 ha (310 acres)

Population (2011)
  - Total: 924; 486/438 ♂/♀
  - Scheduled Castes: 300; 160/140 ♂/♀
  - Total Households: 174

Languages
  - Official: Punjabi
- Time zone: UTC+5:30 (IST)
- Telephone: 01871
- ISO 3166 code: IN-PB
- Vehicle registration: PB-18
- Website: gurdaspur.nic.in

Seikhwan is a village in Batala in Gurdaspur district of Punjab State, India. It is located 26 kilometres (16 mi) from sub district headquarter, 60 kilometres (37 mi) from district headquarter and 8 kilometres (5.0 mi) from Sri Hargobindpur. The village is administrated by Sarpanch an elected representative of the village.

== Demography ==
As of 2011, the village has a total number of 174 houses and a population of 924 of which 486 are males while 438 are females. According to the report published by Census India in 2011, out of the total population of the village 300 people are from Schedule Caste and the village does not have any Schedule Tribe population so far.

== See also ==
- List of villages in India
