= Shahpur Araian =

- Village
- Country: India
- State: Punjab
- District: Gurdaspur
- Tehsil: Batala
- Region: Majha

Government
  - Type: Panchayat raj
  - Body: Gram panchayat

Area
  - Total: 100 ha (250 acres)

Population (2011)
  - Total: 366; 172/194 ♂/♀
  - Scheduled Castes: 55; 27/28 ♂/♀
  - Total Households: 80

Languages
  - Official: Punjabi
- Time zone: UTC+5:30 (IST)
- Telephone: 01871
- ISO 3166 code: IN-PB
- Vehicle registration: PB-18
- Website: gurdaspur.nic.in

Shahpur Araian is a village in Batala in Gurdaspur district of Punjab State, India. It is located 23 kilometres (14 mi) from sub district headquarter, 47 kilometres (29 mi) from district headquarter and 12 kilometres (7.5 mi) from Sri Hargobindpur. The village is administrated by Sarpanch an elected representative of the village.

== Demography ==
As of 2011, the village has a total number of 80 houses and a population of 366 of which 172 are males while 194 are females. According to the report published by Census India in 2011, out of the total population of the village 55 people are from Schedule Caste and the village does not have any Schedule Tribe population so far.

== See also ==
- List of villages in India
