= Thindh =

- Village
- Country: India
- State: Punjab
- District: Gurdaspur
- Tehsil: Batala
- Region: Majha

Government
  - Type: Panchayat raj
  - Body: Gram panchayat

Area
  - Total: 102 ha (250 acres)

Population (2011)
  - Total: 881; 466/415 ♂/♀
  - Scheduled Castes: 465; 246/219 ♂/♀
  - Total Households: 162

Languages
  - Official: Punjabi
- Time zone: UTC+5:30 (IST)
- Telephone: 01871
- ISO 3166 code: IN-PB
- Vehicle registration: PB-18
- Website: gurdaspur.nic.in

Thindh is a village in Batala in Gurdaspur district of Punjab State, India. It is located 10 kilometres (6.2 mi) from sub district headquarter, 40 kilometres (25 mi) from district headquarter and 7 kilometres (4.3 mi) from Sri Hargobindpur. The village is administrated by Sarpanch an elected representative of the village.

== Demography ==
As of 2011, the village has a total number of 162 houses and a population of 881 of which 466 are males while 415 are females. According to the report published by Census India in 2011, out of the total population of the village 465 people are from Schedule Caste and the village does not have any Schedule Tribe population so far.

== See also ==
- List of villages in India
