= Chandu Suja =

Coordinates: 31°55′N 75°04′E

- Village
- Interactive map of Chandu Suja
- Country: India
- State: Punjab
- District: Gurdaspur
- Tehsil: Batala
- Region: Majha

Government
  - Type: Panchayat raj
  - Body: Gram panchayat

Population (2011)
  - Total: 774
  - Total Households: 161
- Sex ratio 399/375 ♂/♀

Languages
  - Official: Punjabi
- Time zone: UTC+5:30 (IST)
- Telephone: 01871
- ISO 3166 code: IN-PB
- Vehicle registration: PB-18
- Website: gurdaspur.nic.in

Chandu Suja is a village in Batala in Gurdaspur district of Punjab State, India. The village is administrated by Sarpanch an elected representative of the village.

== Demography ==
As of 2011, the village has a total number of 161 houses and a population of 774 of which 399 are males while 375 are females according to the report published by Census India in 2011. The literacy rate of the village is 49.12%, lower than the state average of 75.84%. The population of children under the age of 6 years is 112 which is 14.47% of total population of the village, and child sex ratio is approximately 965 higher than the state average of 846.

== See also ==
- List of villages in India
