= Chak Sidhwan =

- Village
- Interactive map of Chak Sidhwan
- Coordinates: 31°38′02.40″N 75°23′04.62″E
- Country: India
- State: Punjab
- District: Gurdaspur
- Tehsil: Batala
- Region: Majha

Government
  - Type: Panchayat raj
  - Body: Gram panchayat

Population (2011)
  - Total: 63
  - Total Households: 11
- Sex ratio 35/28 ♂/♀

Languages
  - Official: Punjabi
- Time zone: UTC+5:30 (IST)
- Telephone: 01871
- ISO 3166 code: IN-PB
- Vehicle registration: PB-18
- Website: gurdaspur.nic.in

Chak Sidhwan is a village in Batala in Gurdaspur district of Punjab State, India. The village is administrated by Sarpanch an elected representative of the village.

== Demography ==
As of 2011, the village has a total number of 11 houses and the population of 63 of which 35 are males while 28 are females according to the report published by Census India in 2011. The literacy rate of the village is 75.76%, highest than the state average of 75.84%. The population of children under the age of 6 years is 4 which is 6.35% of total population of the village, and child sex ratio is approximately 1000 higher than the state average of 846.

== See also ==
- List of villages in India
