= Araianwali =

Coordinates: 31°45′N 75°17′E

- Village
- Interactive map of Araianwali
- Country: India
- State: Punjab
- District: Gurdaspur
- Tehsil: Batala
- Region: Majha

Government
  - Type: Panchayat raj
  - Body: Gram panchayat

Population (2011)
  - Total: 155

Languages
  - Official: Punjabi
- Time zone: UTC+5:30 (IST)
- Telephone: 01871
- ISO 3166 code: IN-PB
- Vehicle registration: PB-18
- Website: gurdaspur.nic.in

Araianwali is a village in Batala in the Gurdaspur district of Punjab State, India. The village is administrated by Sarpanch, an elected representative of the village.

== Demographics ==
The village has a population of 155 as of the 2011 census.

== See also ==
- List of villages in India
