= Talwandi Goraya =

- Village
- Country: India
- State: Punjab
- District: Gurdaspur
- Tehsil: Dera Baba Nanak
- Region: Majha

Government
  - Type: Panchayat raj
  - Body: Gram panchayat

Area
  - Total: 207 ha (510 acres)

Population (2011)
  - Total: 1,179; 629/550 ♂/♀
  - Scheduled Castes: 29; 18/11 ♂/♀
  - Total Households: 201

Languages
  - Official: Punjabi
- Time zone: UTC+5:30 (IST)
- Telephone: 01871
- ISO 3166 code: IN-PB
- Website: gurdaspur.nic.in

Talwandi Goraya is a village in Dera Baba Nanak in Gurdaspur district of Punjab State, India. It is located 12 kilometres (7.5 mi) from sub district headquarters and 40 kilometres (25 mi) from district headquarters. The village is administered by a Sarpanch, who is an elected representative of the village.

== Demography ==
As of 2011, the village has a total number of 201 houses and a population of 1179 of which 629 are males while 550 are females. According to the report published by Census India in 2011, out of the total population of the village, 29 people are from Schedule Caste and the village does not have any Schedule Tribe population so far.

== See also ==
- List of villages in India
