= Qila Lal Singh =

- Village
- Country: India
- State: Punjab
- District: Gurdaspur
- Tehsil: Batala
- Region: Majha

Government
  - Type: Panchayat raj
  - Body: Gram panchayat

Area
  - Total: 89 ha (220 acres)

Population (2011)
  - Total: 2,141; 1,151/990 ♂/♀
  - Scheduled Castes: 862; 464/398 ♂/♀
  - Total Households: 382

Languages
  - Official: Punjabi
- Time zone: UTC+5:30 (IST)
- Telephone: 01871
- ISO 3166 code: IN-PB
- Vehicle registration: PB-18
- Website: gurdaspur.nic.in

Qila Lal Singh is a village in Batala in Gurdaspur district of Punjab, India. It is located eight kilometres (5.0 mi) from sub district headquarter, eight km from district headquarter and eight km from Sri Hargobindpur. The village is administrated by Sarpanch an elected representative of the village.

== Demography ==
As of 2011, the village has a total number of 382 houses and a population of 2141 of which 1151 are males while 990 are females. According to the report published by Census India in 2011, out of the total population of the village 862 people are from Schedule Caste and the village does not have any Schedule Tribe population so far.

== See also ==
- List of villages in India
