= Arora (surname) =

Notable people with the surname Arora, sometimes spelt Aurora, include:

- Aman Arora (born 1974), Indian politician
- Amandeep Kaur Arora, Indian politician
- Amrik Singh Arora (1943–2011), Indian musician
- Amrita Arora (born 1981), Indian actress, model, presenter and VJ
- Anil Arora, Canadian statistician
- Ankit Arora (born 1984), Indian actor
- Ankush Arora, Indian actor and singer
- Apoorva Arora, Indian actress and model
- Arun Arora (born 1971), British Anglican priest and solicitor
- Ashish Arora, Indian structural biologist
- Ashok Kumar Arora, Indian politician
- Bhumika Arora, Indian model
- Bhuvan Arora, Indian actor
- Bobby Arora (born 1972), British billionaire businessman
- Chandan Arora, Indian film editor and director
- Damodar Das Arora, 16th-century Punjabi poet
- David Arora (born 1953), American mycologist, naturalist, and writer
- Dinesh Arora (born 1976), Indian bureaucrat
- Gabo Arora, American filmmaker
- Gagan Arora, Indian actor
- Garima Arora (born 1986), Indian chef
- Gaurav Arora, Indian actor and model
- Geeta Arora, alias Sonu Punjaban (born 1981), Indian convicted sex trafficker
- Ghanshyam Dass Arora (born 1952), Indian politician
- Harjit Singh Arora (1961–2023), Indian air marshal and the second-highest-ranking officer of the Indian Air Force
- Harry Arora (born 1969), American politician
- Harshad Arora (born 1987), Indian actor
- Jagjit Singh Arora (1916–2005), Indian general and commander of the Indian Army on the Eastern front in the Indo-Pakistani War of 1971
- Jas Arora, model and actor
- Jayshree Arora, Indian actress
- Jyoti Arora (born 1977), Indian author and blogger
- Kary Arora (born 1960), Indian DJ
- Kainaat Arora (born 1982), Indian actress
- Kush Arora, American music producer
- Malaika Arora (born 1973), Indian model and actress
- Manish Arora, Indian fashion designer
- Manish Arora, Indian Air Force officer
- Meenakshi Arora, Indian lawyer
- Munish Arora (born 1971), Indian-born Singaporean cricketer
- Namit Arora, Indian writer
- Nikesh Arora (born 1968), Indian-American executive and chief executive officer at Palo Alto Networks
- Paras Arora (born 1994), Indian actor
- Payal Arora, Indian anthropologist, author and processor
- Prerna Arora (born 1987), Indian producer and director
- Punita Arora (born 1946), first woman Lieutenant General of the Indian Armed Forces and Vice admiral of the Indian Navy
- Rachita Arora, Indian singer and music composer
- Rajat Arora (born 1975), Indian screenwriter in the film and television industry
- Jaani (born Rajiv Arora in 1989), Indian songwriter and music composer
- Raj Singh Arora, Indian actor
- Raman Arora, Indian politician
- Ram Behari Arora (1917–1997), Indian cardiovascular pharmacologist
- Ramesh Singh Arora (born 1979), Pakistani politician and social worker
- Raveena Aurora (born 1993), American singer and songwriter
- Ritesh Arora, Indian entrepreneur and angel investor
- Ritvik Arora (born 1997), Indian actor
- Robin Arora (born 1985), British billionaire businessman
- Rohini Arora, Canadian labour organizer and politician
- Roma Arora (born 1987), Indian actress
- Saahil Arora (born 1989), American esports player
- Sam Arora (born 1981), American politician and businessman
- Samir Arora (born 1965), Indian-American businessperson
- Sanjay Arora, Indian filmmaker and actor
- Sanjay Arora (officer) (born 1965), Police Commissioner of Delhi
- Sanjeev Arora (computer scientist) (born 1968), American theoretical computer scientist
- Sanjeev Arora (politician) (born 1963), Indian politician, businessman and Member of Parliament, Rajya Sabha (India)
- Sanjeev Arora (physician) (born 1956), Indian American physician
- Shakti Arora (born 1986), Indian actor
- Shalini Arora (born 1971), Indian television actress
- Shashank Arora (born 1989), Indian actor, writer and musician
- Shiv Arora, Indian politician
- Siddharth Arora, Indian television actor
- Simon Arora (born 1969), British billionaire businessman
- Sudha Arora (born 1946), Indian author
- Sumit Arora, Indian writer, screenwriter and director
- Sunder Sham Arora (born 1958), Indian politician
- Sunil Arora (born 1953), Chief election commissioner of India
- Suresh Arora, Chief of the Punjab Police (2014–2019)
- Surinder Arora (born 1958), Punjabi English businessman
- Tarun Arora, Indian model and actor
- Trishneet Arora (born 1993), Indian ethical hacker, entrepreneur and Forbes Asia 30 under 30 (2018), Fortune India 40 under 40 (2019)
- Udai Prakash Arora (born 1944), Indian historian, pioneer in Graeco-Indian Studies
- Vaibhav Arora (born 1997), Indian cricketer
- Vardaan Arora (born 1992), Indian recording artist, songwriter and actor
- Vijay Arora (1944–2007), Indian actor
- Vijay Kumar Arora, Indian filmmaker and cinematographer
- Vineet M. Arora, American medical researcher
- Vinny Arora (born 1991), Indian actress
- Vishal Arora, Indian journalist
- Vivaan Arora (born 1987), Indian actor
- Yash Arora (born 1993), Indian cricketer

== See also ==
- Arora, a community haling from Punjab.
