= Chabra =

Chabra, also spelt Chhabra and Chhabria, is a Punjabi surname used by Punjabi Hindus and Sikhs of the Arora caste.

Notable people with the surname, who may or may not be affiliated to the clan, include:

- Aarti Chabria (born 1982), Indian actress
- Ajay Chhabra (born 1970), British actor
- Ashish Kumar Chhabra (born 1981), Indian politician
- Bakht Singh Chabra (1903–2000), Indian Christian evangelist
- B. Ch. Chhabra (1908–?), Indian Sanskrit and epigraphy scholar
- Dilip Chhabria, Indian automotive designer
- Jai Chabria, American political strategist
- Lajwanti Chabra, Indian crafts maker and conservator
- Manu Chhabria (1946–2002), Indian businessman
- Mukesh Chhabra (born 1984), Indian casting director
- Paras Chhabra (born 1990), Indian model and TV actor
- Sagari Chhabra, Indian writer and director
- Shravan Chhabria, Indian TV actor
- Sunil Chhabra (born 1957), Kenyan field hockey player
- Tarun Chhabra, American lawyer and security analyst
- Vince Chhabria (born 1969), American judge

== See also ==
- Chhabra, city in Rajasthan, India
