= Meenakshi (name) =

Meenakshi is an Indian given name, usually feminine. Meenakshi (Sanskrit: Mīnākṣī; Tamil: Mīṉāṭci; sometimes spelled as Minakshi; also known as Aṅgayaṟkaṇṇi Mīnāṭci and Taḍādakai), is a Hindu goddess who is considered an avatar of the Goddess Parvati.

Notable people (female unless otherwise noted) with the name include:

== Given name ==
- C. S. Meenakshi, Indian writer
- Meenakshi (Nayak queen) (1700–1736), queen regnant of the Madurai Nayak Kingdom 1731–1736
- Meenakshi Amma (born 1941), Indian martial artist
- Meenakshi Anoop (born 2005), Indian actress in Malayalam films
- Meenakshi Arora, Indian lawyer
- Meenakshi Banerjee, Indian cyanobacteriologist
- Meenakshi Chaudhary (born 1997), Indian actress and model
- Meenakshi Chitharanjan, Indian classical dancer and choreographer
- Meenakshi Dixit (born 1993), Indian actress in Telugu, Tamil, Hindi, Malayalam, and Kannada films
- Meenakshi Gigi Durham, Indian-American professor of communication studies
- Meenakshi Gopinath, Indian educationist, political scientist, and writer
- Meenakshi Goswami (born 1933), Indian actress mainly in Bengali films
- Meenakshi Jain, Indian political scientist and historian
- Meenakshi Lekhi (born 1967), Indian politician
- Meenakshi Madan Rai (born 1964), Indian judge
- Meenakshi Mukherjee (1936/7–2009), Indian writer and educator
- Meenakshi Narain (1964–2022), Indian-American physicist
- Meenakshi Natarajan (born 1973), Indian politician
- Meenakshi Pahuja (born 1978), Indian lecturer and marathon swimmer
- Meenakshi Patel, Indian politician
- Meenakshi Sundaram Pillai (1815–1876), Indian male Tamil scholar and teacher
- Meenakshi Reddy Madhavan, Indian blogger who writes under the pseudonym eM
- Meenakshi Sargogi (1944–2020), Indian industrialist
- Meenakshi Shinde, Indian politician
- Meenakshi Srinivasan (born 1971), Indian classical dancer and choreographer
- Meenakshi Thampan, Indian politician
- Meenakshi Thapar (1984/5–2012), Indian actress in Hindi-language films
- Meenakshi Vijayakumar, Indian firefighter; first Indian woman fire officer
- Meenakshi Wadhwa, American planetary scientist

== Pseudonym ==
- Meenakshi (actress), Pinky Sarkar (born 1982), Indian actress in Tamil, Telugu, and Malayalam language films
- Meenakshi (Malayalam actress), Maria Margaret Sharmilee (born 1985), Indian actress in Malayalam films
- Meenakshi Sheshadri, Shashikala Sheshadri (born 1963), Indian actress in Hindi, Tamil, and Telugu films
- Meenakshi Shirodkar, Ratan Pednekar (1916–1997), Indian actress mainly in Marathi films
