= Meenakshi (disambiguation) =

Meenakshi is a Hindu goddess, sometimes considered an avatar of the goddess Parvati.

Meenakshi may also refer to:

== People ==
- Meenakshi (name), an Indian given name, including a list of people with the name
- Meenakshi (actress), Pinky Sarkar (born 1982), Indian actress in Tamil, Telugu, and Malayalam language films
- Meenakshi (Malayalam actress), Maria Margaret Sharmilee (born 1985), Indian actress in Malayalam films
- Meenakshi (Nayak queen) (1700-1736), queen of the Madurai Nayak Kingdom, ruled in 1731–1736

== Other uses ==
- Meenakshi Power Plant Nellore, Andhra Pradesh India
- Meenakshi Temple, Madurai, Tamil Nadu, India
- Meenakshi TV, an Indian Tamil-language television channel
- Nene Naa, a 2023 Indian Telugu-language mystery thriller film, titled Meenakshi in Hindi
- Meenaxi: A Tale of Three Cities, a 2004 Indian musical drama film by M. F. Husain
