= Sumedh Singh Saini =

Indian police chief

- Known for: Former Director General of Police (DGP) of Punjab Police
- Police career
- Police service: Indian Police Service (IPS)
- Allegiance: India
- Department: Punjab Police
- Service years: 1982 - 2015
- Rank: Director General of Police (DGP)
- Awards: Punjab Gallantry Award (1987)
- Other work: Chairman of the Police Housing Corporation (after DGP post)

Sumedh Singh Saini is an Indian police officer, and the former Director general of police (DGP) of Punjab Police.

== Career ==
Sumedh Saini joined the Indian Police Service (IPS) in 1982 and progressed to serve six districts as Senior Superintendent of Police (SSP) before succeeding Anil Kaushik as the Director-General of Police (DGP) for the Indian State of Punjab on 15 March 2012. He is heading the State Police out of the seven Directors General in the State. The appointment made him the youngest DGP in India.

Appointed very soon after a new government had been formed, involving the Shiromani Akali Dal (SAD) and Bharatiya Janata Party (BJP), Saini was tasked with reducing crime and inhibiting the activities of people involved in the drug trade. Although supported by the Chief Minister, Parkash Singh Badal, the BJP claimed that the decision to appoint was a unilateral one and that they were not consulted. The Times of India noted at the time of his promotion that Saini "... has been in and out of controversies — within the service he has his detractors as well as ardent followers in equal number besides a dedicated fan following among policemen who fought during terrorism."

Saini has been a prominent figure in the efforts to maintain law and order in Punjab, in particular during a period in the 1980s and 1990s when terrorist activity was prevalent. In 1987, Saini won the highest award of Punjab for gallantry, in recognition of his leadership in operations against Khalistani insurgents, and in 1991 he had been injured in an assassination attempt made in Chandigarh by the same insurgents.

In 2005 he was described as a Dirty Harry figure who inspires fear in those whom he seeks to bring to justice. His methods have attracted complaints and caused him to be reported for alleged breaches of human rights, and he has also faced trial as a consequence of the Central Bureau of Investigation (CBI) linking him as the prime suspect in the alleged disappearance and murder of three men. The CBI investigation was deemed to be unlawful by the Supreme Court in December 2011 but court proceedings were still ongoing in 2014.

Saini is also associated with the death of Balwant Singh Multani case and facing trial even till date His activities in corruption investigations have won praise, in particular a 2002 case that involved the Punjab Public Service Commissioner and various High Court judges.

Saini was transferred from his post as DGP in October 2015, allegedly after pressure was put on the state government by the Government of India. He became chairman of the Police Housing Corporation, and his successor as DGP was announced as being Suresh Arora. Concern had been expressed about the police reaction to anti-desecration protests at the village of Behbal Kalan, in Faridkot district, which had led to the deaths of two protestors and left several others injured.

== See also ==
- K. P. S. Gill
- Sadhu Ram Chaudhari
