= Gururani =

Gururani is a surname / last name written by a small number of people from the Brahmin community of region of the state of Uttarakhand, a northern state of India.

== Origins ==
Gururanis used to write Kaushik as their surname before the name Gururani came into existence, and there is a small tale on the origins of this surname. Historically, the name "Gururani" originated when the Katyuri rulers of Kumaon hired highly educated Brahmins (GURU) to provide education to the illiterate queens (RANI) of uttarakhand.

== Native Regions ==
Gururani is a family name for Brahmin caste mostly found in the region of Uttarakhand, and Uttar Pradesh.

The native language of Gururanis is Kumauni, Hindi.
