= Juneja (surname) =

Surname list

Juneja is a surname by the Arora caste of India.

Notable people bearing the surname Juneja, who may or may not be associated with the tribe, include:

- Kiran Juneja (born 1964), Indian actress
- Ramesh Juneja (born 1955), Indian businessman
- Manpreet Juneja (born 1990), Indian cricketer
- Akanksha Juneja, Indian actress
- Manoj Juneja (born 1960), United Nations executive
