= Dewan Chand Saini =

Rai Bahadur Chaudhary Dewan Chand Saini, MBE (1887–unknown) of Gurdaspur was a well-known criminal lawyer and politician of British Punjab.

== Early life ==
Chaudhary Dewan Chand Saini was the son of Chaudhary Fateh Chand, a Wazeer (minister) of the erstwhile princely state of Chamba. His father died when he was seven years old. He was brought up by Lala Ram Sharan who was a pagvat friend of Chaudhary Fateh Chand. The two men had exchanged turbans and had sworn to take care of each other's family in the event of one dying.

Lala Ram Sharan intended Chand to become an engineer but Chand chose the profession of law instead. In 1915 he gained law degree from Lahore and in the same year he married Bibi Achhra Devi. The couple had eight daughters and two sons.

== Career ==
Chand had a distinguished career as an attorney. He was a highly reputed lawyer of Punjab High Court (Lahore) and was later appointed as the leader of its Criminal Bar. He was also a member of Legislative Council of colonial Punjab and as an elected legislator he was known for his advocacy on behalf of agricultural communities.

== Awards and decorations ==
Chand was awarded the title of Rai Sahib by the British government, which was later elevated to Rai Bahadur Later on he was honored and given title of the Member of the Order of the British Empire. He also formed Saini infantry. Which take active part in WW2.And awarded war memorial. He was also founder of Saini sabhas in his region.

He was also allotted a large estate of several Murabas by the colonial government in recognition of his distinguished public services.

== See also ==
- Saini Sadhu Ram Chaudhari, OBE - First police chief of the state of Himachal Pradesh (then a union territory) and union territories of Delhi and Ajmer in independent India
- Sumedh Singh Saini - Indian police chief and Former DGP of punjab police
