= Chana (surname) =

Surname list

Chana is a surname of the Arora community in India.
