= Taneja =

Indian surname

Taneja is an Indian surname found among the Aroravanshi Khatri (Arora) caste.

== Notable people ==
Notable people with the surname, who may or may not be affiliated with the clan, include:

- Arjit Taneja (born 1992), Indian actor and model
- Hemant Taneja (born 1975), American billionaire businessman and venture capitalist
- Ishika Taneja (born 1994), Indian model, Miss India 2017–2018
- Namish Taneja, Indian television actor
- Om Prakash Taneja (1929–2017), Indian fighter pilot
- Preti Taneja, British writer
- Roshan Taneja (1931–2019), Indian acting coach
- Shweta Taneja, Indian novelist, graphic novelist, and journalist
- Vaibhav Taneja, Chief Financial Officer of Tesla

== See also ==
- Taneja Group, American consultants
