= Once Again (2012 film) =

- Film poster
- Directed by: Sanjay Arora
- Written by: Sanjay Arora
- Produced by: Sanjay Arora
- Starring: Deepna Kumar; Ajay Arora; Vidhi Sethi
- Edited by: K. Manish; Parminder Tomar
- Music by: Manoj Singh
- Release date: 23 December 2012 (Delhi International Film Festival)
- Running time: 48 minutes
- Country: India
- Language: Hindi

Once Again is a 2012 Hindi family-drama film produced, written, directed by Sanjay Arora starring Deepna kumar. It premiered at the 2012 Delhi International Film Festival in India.

== Plot ==
Once Again revolves around Raj Malhotra (Protagonist), a self-centered company executive who uses situations and people around him to his advantage but life takes an unexpected turn forcing him to accept reality that paves way to a journey of transformation.

Raj Malhotra, a senior executive at Oranze Computers is a self-centred man who believes in living life for himself with no concern for the feelings of people around him. The story opens with a phone call from his mother who requests him to visit her but Raj defers her request on the pretext of work pressure. Neither does he care for his wife's views about life in general nor does he show any sympathy towards his servant who requests for a leave to see his ailing mother. Raj's ill behaviour extends to his neighbour Mr Sharma played by Ajay Arora, as well in the matters of parking cars.

The heartless attitude of Raj gets apparent when he ignores a man on the road who is lying in a pool of blood because of an accident. At work Raj recruits Jenny, a woman with no good qualifications when she gives him a hint that she is ready to please him outside the office and later that night they get intimate with each other. One day Megha, a team member, at work, approaches him to save her job for not performing well. Raj tells her that he can help her out if she agrees to compromise with him. Left with no choice Megha gives in to him due to which not only her job is saved but also a promotion is given to her. Vishal, who is senior to Megha questions Raj on this discrimination and expresses his disappointment but Raj doesn't care.

The story takes a turn when Raj receives a job offer call from TJ computers where Mr Soni, the Vice-President, interviews him and gives the appointment letter. However, as a prerequisite of joining the work, Raj is asked to do a medical test done for HIV. Hence, he goes to a diagnostic centre to get the test done and while waiting for the report he overhears two lab technicians discussing that there is a problem in the result. When asked by Raj, the technician says that the report will be given directly to the employers. Suspecting that he has HIV, now Raj goes under depression.

During this period, he recalls his nasty and mean behaviour with people and regrets sincerely. He starts valuing and caring for his mother, wife, colleagues and also the servant. However, the biggest lesson he learns is from his neighbour Mr Sharma who when asked the secret behind his composed attitude, explains Raj that the only truth of life is death and when everybody has to die one day why hate or cheat anyone.

After a month, Raj gets a call from TJ computers enquiring about his joining. When Raj meets Mr Soni, he gets to know that actually the report is normal and the test for HIV gave a negative result. Surprised and majorly relieved, Raj joins the organisation and begins a new life. Life offers him temptations again in the form of Sandy who comes for a job. For few minutes Raj gets carried away but when he asks her to submit a medical report with HIV test before joining the work, the word HIV brings him back to his senses, making him recollect his depression during the days he suspected himself of having HIV. Immediately Raj cancels his date with Sandy proving that transformation is a journey.

== Cast ==
- Deepna Kumar as Malini
- Ajay Arora as Mr. Sharma
- Vidhi Sethi as Jenny
- Anil Monga
- Aashutosh Mishra
- Prateek Sharma
- Shree Upadhyaya
- Olga Samuel
- Manish Jain
- Kkaran Soni
- Jyoti Sachdeva
- Gaurav Kumar
- Kuldeep Lulla

== Production ==
Principal photography took place for 2 weeks in March 2012. It was filmed in New Delhi, India and completed in September 2012.

=== Music ===
The background score and a song were composed by Manoj Singh. The music was produced in Mumbai, India. The following song is featured in the film.

- "Badal Gayi Meri Zindagi Chand Lamhon Mein" by Shabana Shaikh, performed by Mahesh Jayaraman.

== Accolades ==
- Official selection at the Delhi International Film Festival 2012.
- Nominated for the Best Screenplay at the Hot Media International Film Festival 2012.
- Honorable Mention award at the International Film Festival for Peace, Inspiration & Equality (IFFPIE) 2013 in Jakarta, Indonesia.
- 3rd prize winner at the 6th Boomtown Film & Music Festival 2013, Texas.
- Nominated for the Best South East Asian Film and Best Director at the World Music & Independent Film Festival 2013, Washington D.C.
- Official Selection at the Trinity International Film Festival 2013, Detroit, USA.
- Won Best film in Religious/Spiritual category at the Great Lakes International Film Festival 2013.
- Won Best Screenplay Award at the Free Spirit Film Festival 2013, India.
- Honorable Mention Award at the International Film Festival of Spirituality, Religion and Visionary 2013.
- Won "Silver Award – Short film competition" at the 2014 California Film Awards, USA.
- Won "Royal Reel Award" at the Canada International Film Festival 2014.
