= Kaushik =

Indian family name

Kaushik (Hindi: कौशिक) or Kaushike (Marathi: कौशिक) or Koushik/Kousik is a surname and gotra of Brahmins named after Brahmarishi Vishvamitra. Kaushik/Koushik is ancient Indian "Gotra" applied to an Indian clan. Origin of Kaushik can be referenced to an ancient Hindu text. There was a Rishi (saint) by the name of "Vishvamitra" literally meaning 'friend of the universe', "Vishwa" as in universe and "Mitra" as in friend, he was also called as Rishi "Kaushik". Vishvamitra is famous in many legendary stories and in different works of Hindu literature. Kaushika is pravara of Vishwamitra gotra.

== Etymology ==
The name "Koushika" (i.e. Kaushik) literally means "descended from Kusha".

== Notable people ==
Notable people with the surname include:

=== Sports ===
- Shivil Kaushik, Indian cricketer
- Manish Kaushik (boxer), Indian boxer
- Haripal Kaushik, Indian field hockey player, military officer and television commentator
- Jagannathan Kaushik, Indian cricketer
- Ankit Kaushik, Indian cricketer
- Aditya Kaushik, Indian cricketer
- Maharaj Krishan Kaushik, former coach of Indian women's hockey team
- Madhav Kaushik, Indian cricketer

=== Entertainers ===
- Ashutosh Kaushik, Indian actor
- Amar Kaushik, Indian director and actor
- Satish Kaushik, Indian film director, producer, and actor
- Kavita Kaushik, Indian actress
- Dinesh Kaushik, Indian actor
- Aravind Kaushik, Indian film director, screenwriter who works in Kannada cinema
- Tashu Kaushik, Indian film actress and model
- Kabeer Kaushik, Indian film director and screenwriter
- Rishi Kaushik, Indian actor
- Divyansha Kaushik, Indian actress

=== Politicians ===
- Dharamlal Kaushik, BJP politician from Chhattisgarh
- Madan Kaushik, BJP politician from Uttarakhand
- Anil Kaushik, Indian National Congress politician from Maharashtra, Ex Dy Mayor, Ex Leader Of Opposition, Navi Mumbai & Currently Vice President, BJP Maharashtra
- Dinesh Kaushik (politician), Indian politician from Haryana
- Ramesh Chander Kaushik, Indian politician from Haryana
- Purushottam Kaushik, former Indian politician from Madhya Pradesh
- Naresh Kaushik, Indian politician from Haryana
- K. M. Koushik, former Indian politician from Maharashtra

=== Others ===
- Ravindra Kaushik, Indian Research and Analysis Wing (RAW) agent who lived undercover in Pakistan
- Bhupendra Nath Kaushik, Indian Hindi and Urdu language poet, writer and satirist
- Ramanath Cowsik, astrophysicist
- Kaushik Basu economist
- Kaushik Ganguly Indian film director
