= P. Kakkan =

Indian politician

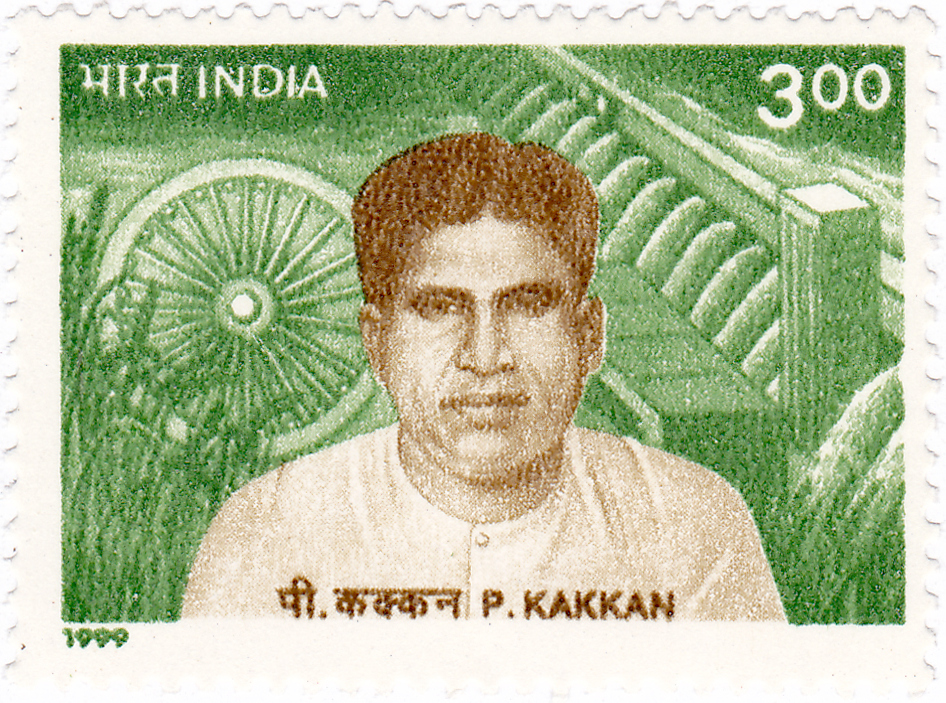

Minister for Home Affairs (Madras state)
- In office 3 October 1963 – 5 March 1967

Minister of Agriculture (Madras state)
- In office 13 March 1962 – 3 October 1963

Member of Madras Legislative Assembly for Samayanallur
- In office 1962–1967

Minister of Public Works (Madras state)
- In office 13 April 1957 – 13 March 1962

Member of Madras Legislative Assembly for Melur
- In office 1957–1962

Member of Parliament (Lok Sabha) for Madurai
- In office 1951–1957
- Prime Minister: Pandit Jawaharlal Nehru
- Preceded by: None
- Succeeded by: K. T. K. Thangamani

Member of Constituent Assembly
- In office 1946–1950
- Monarch: George VI of the United Kingdom
- Prime Minister: Pandit Jawaharlal Nehru
- Preceded by: None
- Succeeded by: None

Personal details
- Born: 18 June 1908 Thumbaipatti, Melur, Madras Presidency, British India
- Died: 23 December 1981 (aged 73) Madras, India
- Party: Congress
- Spouse: Swarnam Parvathi Kakkan
- Profession: Politician

P. Kakkan (18 June 1908 – 23 December 1981), known as Kakkan, was an Indian politician and freedom fighter who served as a member of the Constituent Assembly of India, Member of Parliament, President of the Tamil Nadu Congress Committee and in various ministerial posts in Congress governments in the erstwhile Madras state between 1957 and 1967.

== Early life ==
Kakkan was born into a Tamil Paraiyar family on 18 June 1908 in a village called Thumbaipatti in Melur Taluk, Madurai district of Madras Presidency. His father Poosari Kakkan was a priest in the village shrine.

== Indian independence movement ==
Kakkan was drawn to the independence movement from an early stage in his life. While in school, he joined the Indian National Congress. When the state government brought forth the Temple Entry Authorisation and Indemnity Act in 1939, which removed restrictions on Paraiyar and Shanars entering temples, Kakkan led the temple entry at Madurai. He also participated in the Quit India Movement and was sent to Alipore jail. In 1946, he was elected to the Constituent Assembly and served from 1946 to 1950.

== Politics of Free India ==
Kakkan served as a member of the Lok Sabha from 1952 to 1957. When K. Kamaraj resigned as the President of the Tamil Nadu Congress Committee in order to take office as the Chief Minister of Madras state, Kakkan was elected as the President of the Tamil Nadu Congress Committee. Following the 1957 elections when the Indian National Congress was re-elected to power in the Madras state, Kakkan was sworn in as the Minister for Public Works (excluding Electricity), Harijan Welfare, Scheduled Areas and Scheduled Tribes on 13 April 1957. From 13 March 1962 to 3 October 1963, Kakkan served as the Minister of Agriculture. On 24 April 1962, he was appointed as a member of the Business Advisory Committee and as Home Minister on 3 October 1963 and served till 1967 when the Indian National Congress was defeated in the Assembly elections.

== Later life and death ==
In the 1967 Assembly elections, Kakkan stood for elections from Melur (South) constituency and lost to Dravida Munnetra Kazhagam candidate O. P. Raman. Following his defeat in the 1967 elections, Kakkan retired from politics.

== Work ==
Some of Kakkan's achievements as Minister have been the construction of the Mettur and Vaigai reservoirs and the formation of the Harijan Seva Sangh for the upliftment and welfare of Scheduled Castes. As Minister of Agriculture, he established two Agriculture Universities in Madras state. In 1999, the Government of India released a postage stamp commemorating Kakkan and his contributions to the nation.

== Family ==
Swarnam Parvathi Kakkan, his wife was a very simple person. She worked as a school teacher in Madurai. She was a great companion and supporter of his principles.

Children: He had five sons and one daughter. P K Padmanathan, his first son, served the Tamil Nadu Government as President and Registrar of Cooperative societies. He was married to Prof. V S Krishnakumari who is a paediatrician and worked as the Director of Institute of Child Health Egmore, Chennai (see Madras Medical College). His eldest granddaughter Meenakshi Vijayakumar is currently the Deputy Director in TN fire Services. She is one of the two woman fire officers recruited in Fire service in the country. His second granddaughter Shanthi Krishnan, works in the UK for the National Health Service.

His second son, P K Pakkiyanathan, worked for Simpson's Chennai. His third son, P K Kasiviswanathan, was an IPS officer who worked as Assistant commissioner of Police in Madurai. His fourth son, Dr. P K Sathyanathan served as Medical Officer in Tamil Nadu Municipal Service and retired. Dr. Sathyanathan's son S Anand is involved in politics and is now serving as State Research Chairman in Tamil Nadu Youth Congress. His last son is P K Nadarajamoorthy. His daughter Kasthuri Sivasamy was involved in state politics. Her husband Sivasamy is a retired Chief Engineer at Port Blair Andaman. Their third daughter Rajeshwari is an IPS officer and DIG of police Tamil Nadu

Kakkan's brother Viswanathan Kakkan, an advocate, was a former Vice-President of the Hindu Munnani and a well-known devotee of the Shankaracharya of Kanchi, Jayendra Saraswathi. He unsuccessfully contested the 2006 Assembly election in Tamil Nadu from Perambur as a candidate of the Janata Party.
