= Mankind Pharma =

Indian pharmaceutical and healthcare products company

Mankind Pharma Limited
- Type: Public
- Traded as: NSE: MANKIND; BSE: 543904
- ISIN: INE634S01028
- Industry: Pharmaceutical
- Founded: 1991; 35 years ago
- Founders: Ramesh C. Juneja; Rajeev Juneja
- Headquarters: Okhla Phase III, Delhi, India
- Area served: Worldwide
- Key people: Ramesh Juneja (Chairman); Rajeev Juneja (MD & Vice Chairman); Sheetal Arora (CEO); Arjun Juneja (COO)
- Products: Pharmaceuticals; Generic drugs; OTC; FMCG; Diagnostics
- Revenue: ▲₹12,207 crore (US$1.3 billion) (2025)
- Operating income: ▲₹3,030 crore (US$310 million) (2025)
- Net income: ▲₹2,007 crore (US$210 million) (2025)
- Total assets: ▲₹27,759 crore (US$2.9 billion) (2025)
- Total equity: ▲₹14,568 crore (US$1.5 billion) (2025)
- Number of employees: 22,000+ (2023)
- Website: www.mankindpharma.com
- Footnotes; Financials as of 31 March 2025.

Mankind Pharma is an Indian multinational pharmaceutical and healthcare product company, headquartered in Delhi. The company has products in therapeutic areas ranging from antibiotics, to gastrointestinal, cardiovascular, dermal, and erectile dysfunction medications.

As of 2023, Mankind Pharma had 25 factories and 6 R&D centres in India. The company derived 97% of its operating revenue from the Indian market, where it is reportedly the fourth largest pharmaceutical company by domestic sales. Some of Mankind Pharma's consumer healthcare brands are the largest-selling in their respective categories, including Manforce in condoms, Prega News in pregnancy test kits, and Unwanted-72 in emergency contraception.

== History ==
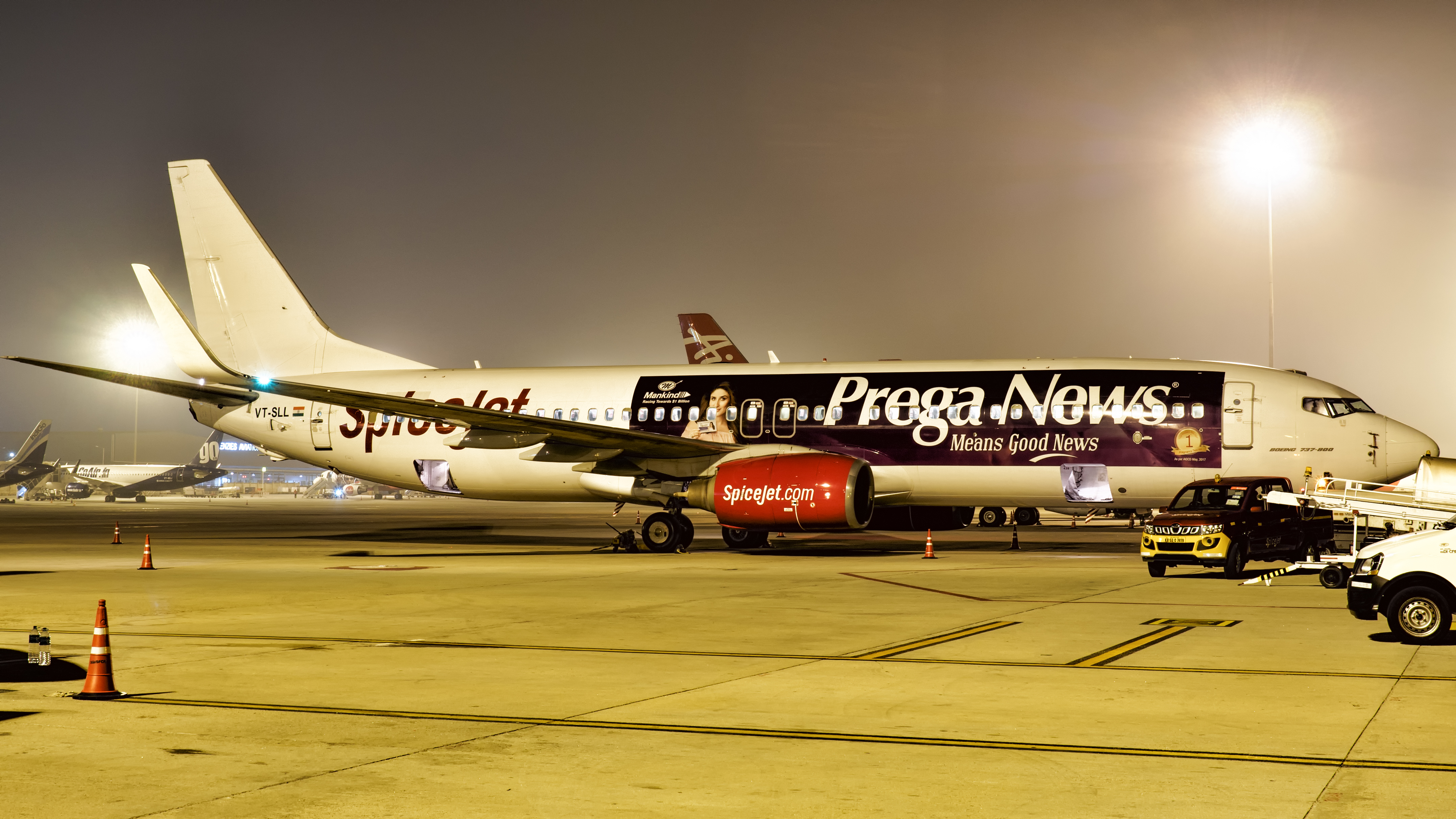
Prega News livery on a SpiceJet aircraft.

Mankind Pharma was incorporated in 1991, and actively started its operations in 1995, with the contributions of two brothers, Ramesh C. Juneja and Rajeev Juneja, who established the company with a seed capital of ₹5,000,000. The company was started with 20 employees and launched in two states in the first year of its operation.

Mankind Pharma initially targeted price-sensitive drugs, with a focus on rural market; its early products included antibacterial drug Zenflox and prescription antibiotic Moxikind CV, which were priced at a steep discount to the existing products in the market. The company ventured into the over-the-counter segment in 2007, focusing primarily on sexual healthcare products.

The company acquired Magnet Labs Pvt. Ltd. to enter the antipsychotic segment in 2007. It acquired Longifene-an appetite stimulant for children in January 2010 which was earlier a brand of UCB.

In 2017, Mankind Pharma established Pathkind Labs, a provider of diagnostics and healthcare tests.

In 2019, Mankind became the first Indian company and second only in the world to develop and launch Dydrogesterone, a drug used in high-risk pregnancies and infertility by the brand name Dydroboon.

In 2022, Mankind acquired Panacea Biotec Pharma's domestic formulations brands in India and Nepal for ₹1,872 crore (US$190 million). It then acquired a respiratory treatment product, and an infant skincare brand from Dr. Reddy's Laboratories. It also bought a majority stake in the Ayurvedic and herbal products manufacturer, Upakarma Ayurveda.

In 2022, the company entered agritech and pet care segments.

In April 2023, Mankind Pharma launched its initial public offering (IPO), with existing investors selling ₹4,326 crore (US$450 million) worth of shares.

In 2024, Mankind Pharma acquired a 100% stake in Bharat Serums and Vaccines (BSV) from private equity firm Advent International for an enterprise value of ₹13,630 crore (US$1.4 billion). The deal included over 2,500 employees joining the company. Mankind also aimed to raise up to ₹10,000 crore through non-convertible debentures to support its growth initiatives.

== See also ==
- Pharmaceutical industry in India
