= Sadhu Ram Chaudhari =

Police officer

Sadhu Ram Chaudhari (born July 14, 1900 - unknown) was the first police chief of the state of Himachal Pradesh (then a union territory) and union territories of Delhi and Ajmer in independent India.

== Family background ==
He was born on July 14, 1900. He was born in Saini caste. He was the son of Chaudhari Gurdit Singh Saini and Shanti Devi of village Rallana in the Hoshiarpur district of Punjab. He was Indian Police Services of officer of Punjab cadre and had joined Punjab Police in Oct 1922.

== Police career ==
He joined the Indian Police as Asst-Supdt. of Police and worked in the various districts of the Punjab as Supdt. of Police up to 1946. In 1948 he was given the joint command of the police forces of Himachal Pradesh, Delhi and Ajmer as Inspector General of Police, also called Commissioner of Police in union territories.

Himachal Pradesh, Delhi and Ajmer were still union territories in 1948.

== OBE decoration ==
In 1945 Chaudhari received the decoration of Officer of the Order of the British Empire.

== See also ==
- Chaudhary Dewan Chand Saini - MBE
- Sumedh Singh Saini - Indian police chief and Former DGP of punjab police
- List of notable Saini personalities
