= Manu Chhabria =

Indian businessman

- Born: Manohar Rajaram Chhabria; 1 March 1946; Mumbai, India
- Died: 6 April 2002 (aged 56); Mumbai, India
- Education: Harvard University
- Known for: Jumbo Electronics, a Dubai-based electronics store
- Spouse: Vidya Chhabria (m. ? - 2002)

Manohar Rajaram Chhabria (March 1, 1946 – April 6, 2002), commonly known as Manu Chhabria was an Indian businessman based in Dubai, and the owner of the $2.5 billion transnational conglomerate, Jumbo Group.

== Career ==
Chhabria started his career by joining his family business of running a shop named Raja Radio, trading radio assemblies and electronic components (mainly of Philips India) on Lamington Road in Mumbai. He moved to Dubai in 1973, to run Jumbo Electronics, a sales agency owned by his family trading in the same products as in Mumbai. Dubai was at that time an obscure backwater, and in 1974, Chhabria was able to negotiate a contract with Sony, the Japanese electronics manufacturer, for Jumbo Electronics to become the sole distributors of Sony in the UAE. To his great good fortune, the oil boom began after the Oil Crisis of 1973 and swampy, backward Dubai became flush with oil money. Chhabria's business as an exclusive dealer of Sony's products flourished at a scale he could never have dreamt possible, there were no taxes of any sort in Dubai, and Chhabria was soon a man of immense wealth.

In India, during his bonhomie with Sony, he started a Sony branded Color/BW TV/Portable Audio system manufacturing/assembly unit in 80's in Mumbai in the name of Orson Electronics Ltd, which was one of the pioneers in India in that industry. Orson came much before Onida or Videocon and others in the modern Electronics field in India and was the number one. In the audio field, it was beating Philips. Unfortunately, due to mismanaged operations and mainly due to pumping out hard cash from the profits to Chhabria in Dubai, soon that empire collapsed. Orson was one of the first to revolutionize Production/Inventory/Sales in the Electronics Industry through in-house computer systems and applications. By 1991, Orson was a dead unit.

Chhabria leveraged this money and his contacts through the Sindhi community to which he belonged, to make some spectacular takeovers of undervalued or ailing but fundamentally sound corporates in India. A series of widely publicized corporate takeovers made Chhabria notorious in India as a "corporate raider" without precedent in the staid and old-world environment of India. His significant takeovers included Shaw Wallace, the liquor giant; and Dunlop, the ailing rubber tyres giant, which he took over jointly in 1984 with R. P. Goenka's RPG Group (he later became the single largest shareholder when he bought out RPG's stake).

It is noteworthy that Chhabria's takeovers and acquisitions were not informed by any considerations of business synergies or complementarities. They were targeted by him for takeover based on market undervaluation and weaknesses in the share-holding pattern, and it was speculated in the press at that time that his intention was not to run any of the companies but to strip them of their assets and then abandon them. His major acquisitions were the following six companies: Shaw Wallace (liquor manufacturer), Dunlop India and Falcon Tyres (both rubber tire manufacturers), Hindustan Dorr Oliver (water treatment and pollution control projects), Mather & Platt (pump-set manufacturers) and Gordon Woodroffe (freight carrier). The total asset value of these companies ran to about $600 million

=== Downturn ===
Chhabria was unable to sustain his acquisitions, not only because of the utter absence of synergy in his companies but also because nothing in his education or business background prepared him for running a corporation of any size, least of all corporates that were undervalued since they were facing problems of various types for internal or external reasons. Unfortunately, Chhabria's way of dealing with situations was mainly to shout abuse at his senior employees, often in front of line workers, and threaten them with the sack. Much of the talent that he had inherited from previous management was lost due to these shenanigans. He also took to "head-hunting," which involved offering fantastic salaries to good performers in competitor companies to come work for him. He would then expect them to produce results in a matter of weeks, with no other facilitation or investment. He ran his companies on fear often taking legal action against former employees who left his employment voluntarily. This approach proved equally disastrous. Recognizing the fundamental deficiency in his own profile, Chhabria spent a few weeks attending a short-term course at Harvard Business School, but no miracle emerged from this initiative either.

What did emerge was that Chhabria had been more creative than prudent in his accounting and fund-raising practices. His takeover tactics had left him with numerous powerful enemies in industry and a trust deficit in government and the money markets. A slew of legal cases were filed against him in both his personal and official capacities, for crimes ranging from fraud (numerous cases) to bribery to tax evasion to illegal share dealings to non-payment of employee provident fund obligations. The courts in India issued non-bailable warrants against him and he was to be arrested as soon as he set foot on Indian soil. He was therefore unable to visit India, where all his companies were based, for more than a decade before his death. He came precariously close to being proclaimed a fugitive by the government of India. Cases were also filed against him in Hong Kong courts. One of the long-running legal actions related to his take over of the Shaw Wallace distilling and brewing group where it was alleged that had done so in partnership with Vijay Mallya of the Kingfisher brewing group, who was prohibited from taking over Shaw Wallace for regulatory reasons. This takeover also spawned litigation between Chhabria and his brother Kishore whom he had sent back to India to run the business and who it was alleged had many of the Shaw Wallace brands transferred to his own interests.

In less than a decade after the heady days of 1984, Chhabria found that not one of his acquisitions was doing well; all were embroiled in serious litigation; and his name and credit were reviled universally. His flagship, Shaw Wallace, faced 110 winding-up petitions filed by 178 creditors. Falcon Tyres and Dunlop Tyres came under BIFR (bankruptcy proceedings) and were later sold to the Ruia group. At Mather & Platt, the workers' union petitioned the Company Law Board (CLB) to remove Chhabria from the driving seat and this was done. Orson Ltd simply folded up and was liquidated.

== Death ==
Chhabria died in Mumbai on April 6, 2002, following a heart attack, at the age of 56. He was survived by his wife Vidhya Manohar Chhabria and by three daughters, Komal, Bhavika and Kiran. Komal Rajiv Wazir now runs Chhabria's most famous takeover, Shaw Wallace; Bhavika Godhwani runs Hindustan Dorr Oliver, another takeover, while Kiran Chhabria runs Jumbo, the original Chhabria venture, in Dubai.
