= Dinesh Arora =

Indian civil servant and public health specialist

Principal Health Specialist

Personal details
- Born: 23 December 1976 (age 49) New Delhi, India
- Education: Government Medical College and Hospital, Chandigarh; London School of Economics; Johns Hopkins Bloomberg School of Public Health
- Occupation: Civil servant, physician, public health specialist
- Known for: Public health administration; Ayushman Bharat; rural electrification

Dinesh Arora (born 23 December 1976) is an Indian civil servant, physician and public health specialist. A member of the Indian Administrative Service (IAS) from the 2002 batch, he was allotted the Kerala cadre and has held senior positions in the Government of India and the Government of Kerala.

Arora is a Chevening Scholar and holds a master's degree in economics and a Master of Public Health from the Johns Hopkins Bloomberg School of Public Health. He is pursuing doctoral studies in health policy at Johns Hopkins University.

He currently serves as a Principal Health Specialist in the Human and Social Development Sector Office of the Asian Development Bank (ADB). His work at ADB includes health-systems strengthening, pandemic preparedness, vaccination, early childhood development, health-sector assessments, and climate and health.

Arora previously served as Director (Health) at NITI Aayog and as the founding Deputy Chief Executive Officer of the National Health Authority, where he was involved in the design and early implementation of Ayushman Bharat Pradhan Mantri Jan Arogya Yojana (PM-JAY).

== Early life and education ==
Arora was born on 23 December 1976. His home town is recorded as Punjab in the Kerala government's IAS civil list.

He studied medicine at Government Medical College, Chandigarh, where he completed his MBBS. He subsequently pursued postgraduate education in economics and public health. He studied economics at the London School of Economics and Political Science as a Chevening Scholar and completed a Master of Public Health at the Johns Hopkins Bloomberg School of Public Health in 2020 as a Sommer Scholar.

Arora later began doctoral studies in health policy at Johns Hopkins University as a Dean Scholar.

== Indian Administrative Service career ==
Arora entered the Indian Administrative Service in 2002. The Government of Kerala's civil list records his year of allotment as 2002, date of appointment as 2 September 2002, and cadre as Kerala.

During his career in Kerala, Arora held a number of administrative and public-health positions, including Sub-Collector, District Collector and Mission Director of the state's National Rural Health Mission. He was subsequently deputed to the Government of India, where he held positions in NITI Aayog, the Ministry of Health and Family Welfare, and the National Health Authority.

== Kerala public administration ==
=== National Rural Health Mission ===
Arora served as Mission Director of the National Rural Health Mission in Kerala for more than five years. According to the Asian Development Bank, his work during this period included health-service improvement, quality accreditation of public hospitals, and the establishment and institutionalisation of the Kerala Medical Service Corporation and the Food Safety Commission.

A National Health Mission workshop publication lists Arora as Mission Director of the National Rural Health Mission in Kerala and includes a presentation by him on the state's public-health quality improvement efforts.

During his tenure, Kerala's public hospitals pursued quality-accreditation initiatives, including accreditation under the National Accreditation Board for Hospitals & Healthcare Providers.

=== District administration ===
As a district administrator in Kerala, Arora was involved in enforcement actions and public-safety measures.

In 2005, while Sub-Collector at Ottapalam, he took action against illegal sand mining along the Bharathapuzha river. The measures targeted unauthorised extraction and sought to enforce existing restrictions on sand mining.

While District Collector of Thiruvananthapuram, he ordered restrictions on blasting and other quarrying operations and established a committee to conduct a safety audit of quarries in the district. The committee included representatives from the district administration, geology department and Kerala State Pollution Control Board.

He also introduced road-safety requirements for vehicles transporting school students in Kerala. The measures included requirements concerning identification of school-duty vehicles, vehicle capacity and safety equipment on school buses.

In 2011, while District Collector of Thiruvananthapuram, Arora also issued regulations governing the use of captive elephants at public events. The regulations required organisers to obtain permission and included checks relating to the health and condition of elephants and the qualifications of mahouts.

As District Collector of Kannur, he introduced expanded videography of polling at sensitive polling stations during elections. The system was intended to document procedures including the sealing of electronic voting machines and the handling of voters and polling agents.

== National government career ==
=== NITI Aayog ===
Arora served as Director (Health) at NITI Aayog, the Government of India's public-policy think tank. His work focused on health policy, health equity, universal health coverage and public-private partnerships in healthcare.

He was appointed Director at NITI Aayog in 2017.

His responsibilities included work on health-policy implementation and initiatives associated with the Aspirational Districts Programme.

=== Ayushman Bharat ===
In 2018, Arora was appointed to a senior role in the implementation of the Government of India's Ayushman Bharat programme. Contemporary reporting identified him as a Kerala-cadre IAS officer appointed Director for the scheme in the Ministry of Health and Family Welfare.

He subsequently became the founding Deputy Chief Executive Officer of the National Health Authority. In that role, he was involved in the design and early implementation of Ayushman Bharat Pradhan Mantri Jan Arogya Yojana (PM-JAY), including scheme design, beneficiary coverage, information-technology systems, implementation arrangements and monitoring mechanisms.

The programme was designed as a major publicly funded health-assurance initiative for eligible Indian households. Arora's work included coordination between central and state governments and the development of operational and monitoring frameworks.

The Asian Development Bank also credits Arora with helping lay the foundation for the Ayushman Bharat Digital Mission.

== Rural electrification ==
In 2016, Arora became Executive Director of the Rural Electrification Corporation (REC) and Chief Executive Officer of REC Power Distribution Company Limited (RECPDCL), a subsidiary of REC.

He worked on rural-electrification programmes, including the Deen Dayal Upadhyaya Gram Jyoti Yojana. During this period, he was involved in the development of the GARV mobile application, which provided village-level information on progress in rural electrification.

The Government of India's case study on GARV identifies Arora as the executive director of REC and CEO of RECPDCL who headed the project monitoring group for rural-electrification initiatives. The application allowed field personnel known as Gram Vidyut Abhiyantas to upload photographs and location data from electrification projects.

The GARV initiative received several awards in 2016, including recognition at the Digital India Awards and the National e-Governance Awards.

== International career ==
=== Asian Development Bank ===
Arora joined the Asian Development Bank and became a Principal Health Specialist in its Human and Social Development Sector Office.

At ADB, his portfolio has included health-system assessments, human resources for health, pandemic preparedness, adult vaccination, vaccine and diagnostics manufacturing, regulatory strengthening, early childhood development and One Health. He has also worked on climate and health and health-system resilience.

Arora has participated in ADB projects concerning early childhood development in India and climate-resilient health systems. In 2024, ADB identified him as a knowledge contributor to its early-childhood-development work in Meghalaya.

He has also participated in international discussions on pandemic preparedness and climate and health.

== Research and public health work ==
Arora's professional work has focused on public health systems, universal health coverage, health financing, digital health, pandemic preparedness and health-system resilience.

He has also contributed to academic research in international health. His name appears as an author in a study concerning integrated health-service delivery during the COVID-19 pandemic in low- and lower-middle-income countries.

In addition to his public-service career, he has participated in work on climate-resilient healthcare and pandemic preparedness in Asia and the Pacific.

== Awards and recognition ==
Arora was selected as a Chevening Scholar by the British government for postgraduate study in the United Kingdom.

In 2016, he received a human-resources-related award at the World HRD Congress while CEO of RECPDCL.

During his time at REC, the GARV project received national recognition, including the Digital India Award and a National e-Governance Award.

== See also ==
- Indian Administrative Service
- NITI Aayog
- Ayushman Bharat
- Deen Dayal Upadhyaya Gram Jyoti Yojana
- Asian Development Bank
