= Sanjeev Arora (physician) =

Indian-American phyisican

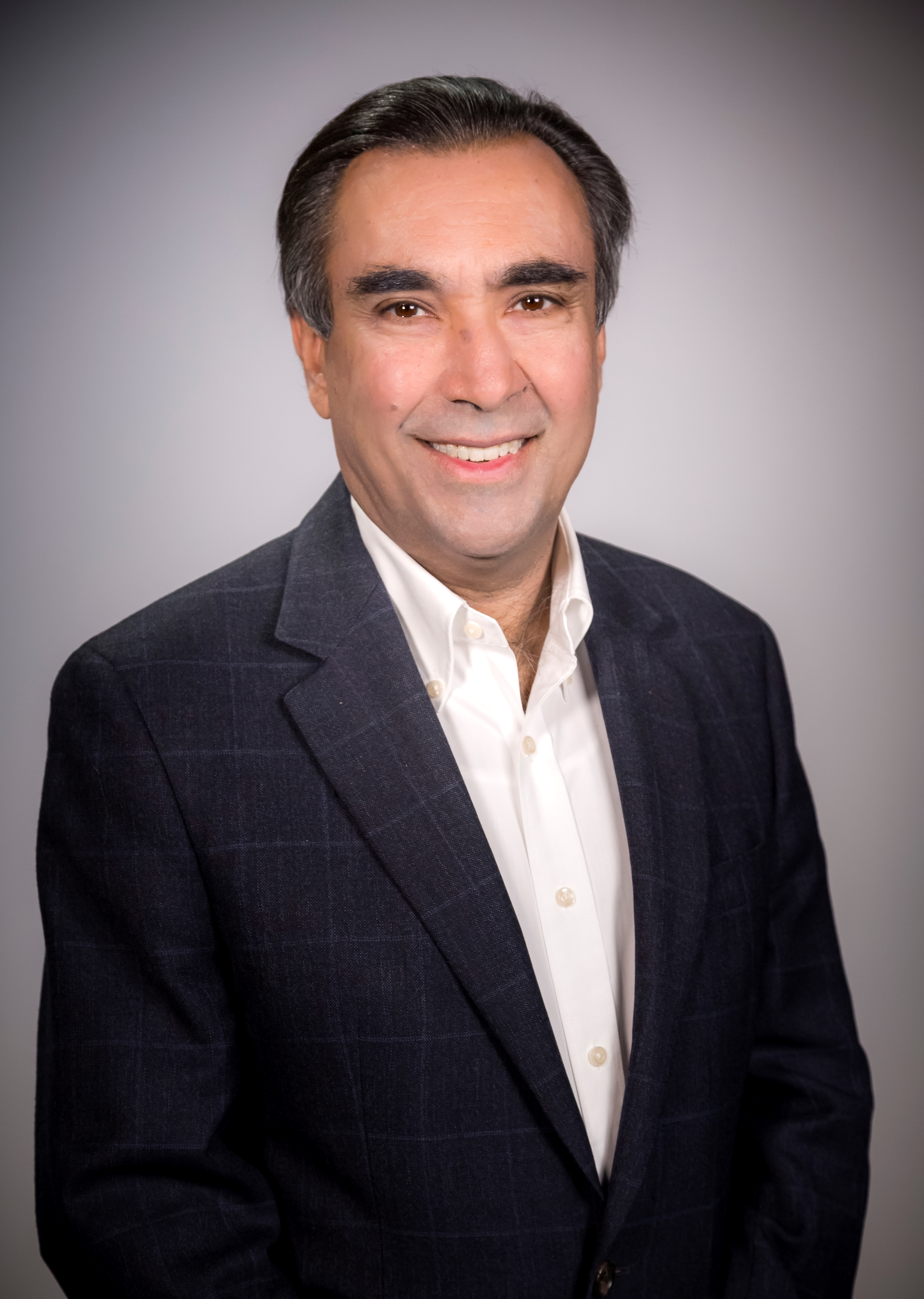
- Arora in 2021
- Born: September 1956 (age 69); Nangal, India
- Citizenship: United States
- Education: Armed Forces Medical College, Maharaja College
- Awards: 19th Heinz Award for Public Policy, Second Richard and Hinda Rosenthal Award, UNM Presidential Award of Distinction, ACP and ATA President's Award, 2021 Brock Prize Laureate, 2020 Zooomtopia Innovation Award, 2019 Distinguished Public Service Award
- Scientific career
- Fields: Medicine, telehealth, telemedicine, telementoring
- Workplaces: Project ECHO at the University of New Mexico Health Sciences Center

Sanjeev Arora (born September 1956), an Indian American physician, is the founder of Project ECHO, a global tele-mentoring nonprofit dedicated to disseminating knowledge in rural and under-resourced communities.

Arora is also a distinguished professor and regents' professor of medicine, director of the Office of Clinical Affairs, and executive vice chair for the Department of Internal Medicine at the University of New Mexico Health Sciences Center (UNM HSC) in Albuquerque, New Mexico. Arora developed and implemented the Hepatitis C Disease Management Program at UNM HSC.

== Education ==
Arora received a premedical degree from Maharajah College in Jaipur, India, followed by his medical degree at the Armed Forces Medical College in Pune and an internship at Army Hospital, Delhi. He completed several residencies, first in medicine at Safdarjung Hospital in New Delhi, then for surgery at Maimonides Medical Center in Brooklyn, New York, returning to medicine at the Sisters of Charity Hospital, State University of New York in Buffalo. He completed his fellowship in gastroenterology at the New England Medical Center in Boston.

== Career ==
Arora began his career in academia in 1987 as an assistant professor of medicine at Tufts University. In 1993, he moved to UNM HSC where he served in various positions, including section chief of gastroenterology, associate professor, chief of medical staff, director at the Office of Clinical Affairs, executive vice-chair of the Department of Internal Medicine, and distinguished professor of medicine. In 2019, Arora was promoted to distinguished and regents' professor of medicine.

Arora was frustrated that he could treat only a fraction of the more than 28,000 New Mexicans with hepatitis C. At the time, his clinic's wait list to see patients was eight months, and many patients lived in rural communities with little to no access to the clinic. As a result, people were dying of this treatable disease. In response, Arora created Project ECHO to share his expertise with primary care providers in rural communities. His first ECHO program resulted in 21 new centers of excellence equipped to treat hepatitis C across New Mexico.

Launched in 2003, Project ECHO is a guided-practice model that uses an "all teach, all learn" framework with videoconferencing technology and case-based problem solving to reduce disparities in underserved and remote areas. The ECHO model has a hub-and-spoke structure: Teams of subject matter experts at regional, national, and global centers ("hubs") connect with community-based participants in weekly virtual meetings that include educational briefs, case presentations, and discussion. In this way, participants create the "spokes" by mastering and passing on best practices for creating change within their own communities in multiple disciplines including health care, education, and civics.

Founded to meet the needs of New Mexicans, ECHO's current goal is to support health care and education in rural and under-resourced communities around the world. The ECHO model has been evaluated by more than 800 peer-reviewed studies, including a landmark 2011 evaluation published in the New England Journal of Medicine..

== Awards and honors ==
Arora's awards and honors include: the Teresa Heinz and the Heinz Family Foundation 19th Heinz Award for Public Policy,[2] the second Richard and Hinda Rosenthal Award from the Rosenthal Family Foundation,[3] the Presidential Award of Distinction from the University of New Mexico,[4] and the American College of Physicians and American Telemedicine Association (ATA) President's Award.[5]

Arora was also recognized on World Hepatitis Day 2014 at the White House as a leader in advancing efforts to address viral hepatitis and the goals of the Action Plan for the Prevention, Care, and Treatment of Viral Hepatitis.

Recent awards include The Brock Prize in Education Innovation rewards ideas proven to enhance education while achieving a global impact, universal accessibility and a proven track record. Arora received this award for his founding of and work with Project ECHO.

Arora and Project ECHO received the Innovation Award for Exceptional Healthcare for the use of Zoom in hospitals and clinics. Since the start of the pandemic, Project ECHO has used Zoom to deliver critical information and education about COVID-19 to hospitals and healthcare clinics around the world, providing them the knowledge they need to treat the virus and save lives. Project ECHO has been leveraging Zoom to reach healthcare workers since 2013.

Arora received both the New Mexico Distinguished Public Service Award and the Lifetime Achievement Award from Governor Michelle Lujan Grisham. The awards recognize outstanding service by both public employees and private citizens who volunteer their time to public service.

== Selected articles ==
- Arora, Sanjeev; al., et (August 2020). "Enhancing Collaborative Learning for Quality Improvement: Evidence from the Improving Clinical Flow Project, a Breakthrough Series Collaborative with Project ECHO". The Joint Commission Journal on Quality and Patient Safety. 46 (8): 448–456. doi:10.1016/S2468-1253(18)30390-X. PMID 32507466.
- Arora, Sanjeev; Byers, Emily (July 2020). "Leveraging Local Expertise to Improve Rural Cancer Care Outcomes Using Project ECHO: A Response to Levit et al". JCO Oncology Practice. 16 (7): 399–403. doi:10.1016/j.jcjq.2020.04.013. PMID 32574127.
- Arora, Sanjeev; Thornton, Karla (July 21, 2020). "Novel Models of Hepatitis C Virus Care Delivery: Telemedicine, Project ECHO, and Integrative Care". Clinical Liver Disease. 16 (1): 399–403. doi:10.1002/cld.912. PMC 7373769. PMID 32714515.
- Arora, Sanjeev (February 2020). "Project ECHO: democratising knowledge for the elimination of viral hepatitis". Lancet Gastroenterology & Hepatology. 4 (2): 91–93. doi:10.1016/S2468-1253(18)30390-X. PMID 30647014.
