= Vivaan Arora =

Indian actor

- Occupation: Actor
- Years active: present

Vivaan Arora is a Punjabi actor who has appeared in Punjabi films such as Aish Kar Lai, Ek Wari Haan Karde and Dramebaaz kalakar (2017).He has also appeared in some Indian television series, like Khushiyon Kii Gullak Aashi, SuperCops vs Supervillains, Savdhaan India and Aahat (season 6).

== Filmography ==
=== Film ===
- Aish Kar Lai
- Ek Wari Haan Karde

=== Television ===
- Sony Pal's Khushiyon Kii Gullak Aashi
- Life OK's SuperCops vs Supervillains, Savdhaan India
- Sony TV's Aahat (season 6)
