= Namit Arora =

Indian writer

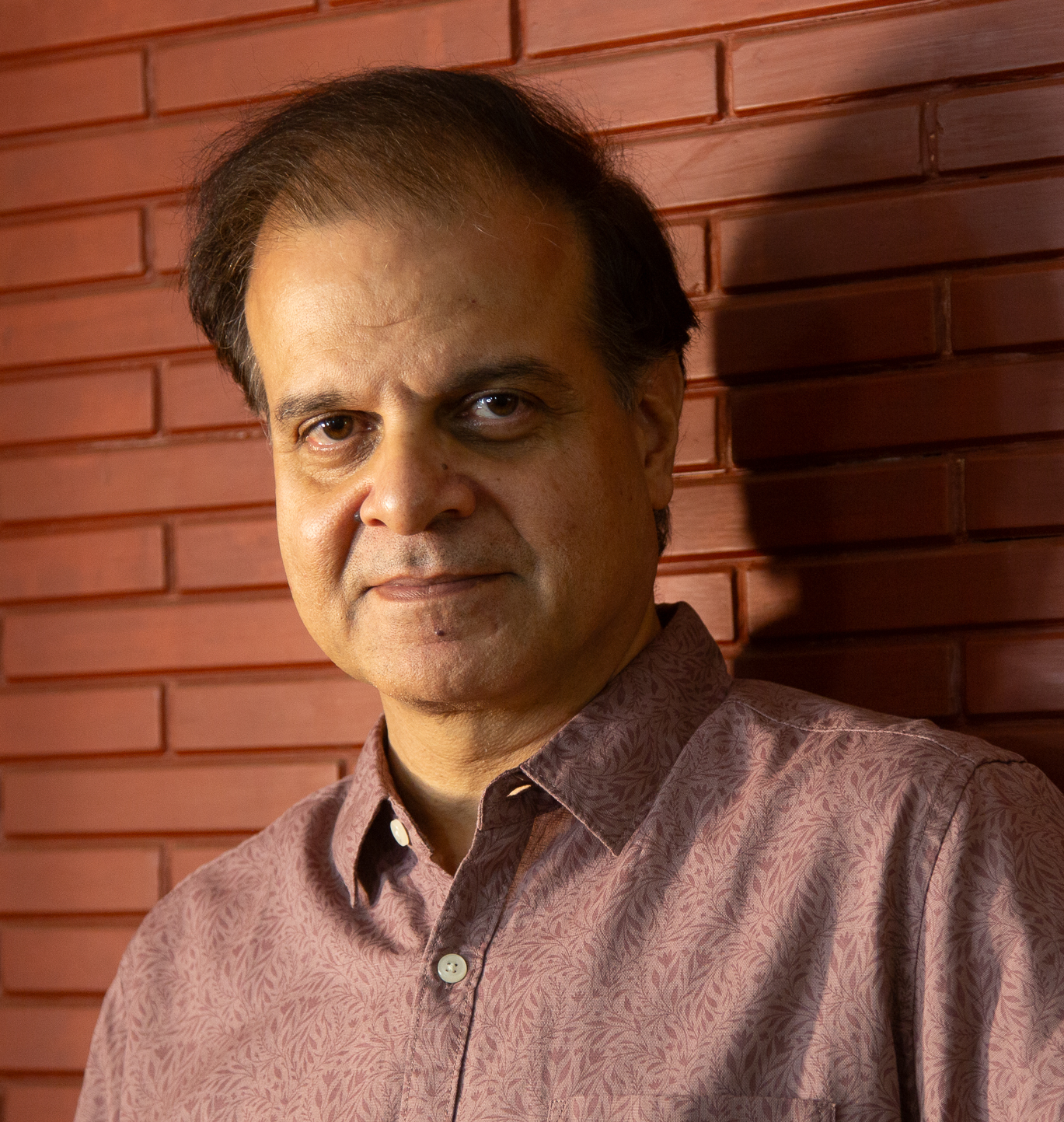
- Born: India
- Education: IIT Kharagpur
- Occupation: Writer
- Notable work: Indians: A Brief History of a Civilization

Namit Arora is an Indian author.

Arora grew up in Gwalior. He is an alumnus of IIT Kharagpur. He obtained a master's degree in computer engineering from Louisiana. He cut short his career of almost 2 decades in the tech industry of Silicon Valley to return to India in 2013 to write books.

Arora's book Indians: A Brief History of a Civilization has been translated into Hindi and Tamil, and was longlisted for the 2022 Karwaan Book Award. He is an Indian author. A web-series based on the book, supported by a grant from the Raza Foundation and narrated by Arora himself, was published on The Wire in 2024.

== Books ==
- The Lottery of Birth: On Inherited Social Inequalities. Publisher: Three Essays Collective.
- A California Story. Publisher: Adelaide Books LLC.
- Love and Loathing in Silicon Valley: A Novel. Publisher: Speaking Tiger Books.
- Indians: A Brief History of A Civilization. Penguin India.
- Speaking of History, co-authored with Romila Thapar. Penguin India.
