= Ram Behari Arora =

Indian pharmacologist (1917–1997)

- Born: 31 March 1917; British India
- Died: Unknown
- Known for: Medical academics and studies on pharmacology
- Awards: 1961 Shanti Swarup Bhatnagar Prize
- Scientific career
- Fields: Pharmacology; Clinical Cardiology
- Institutions: Sawai ManSingh Medical College

Ram Behari Arora (1917–1997) was an Indian pharmacologist, medical academic, and the founding head of the department of pharmacology at Sawai ManSingh Medical College, the first medical college in the Indian state of Rajasthan. He was one of the founder fellows of the National Academy of Medical Sciences.

== Career ==
Born on 31 March 1917, Arora was known for his contributions to the field of cardiovascular pharmacotherapeutics. He researched traditional Indian medicine and published several medical papers on the subject; (Note: Please see Selected bibliography section) his articles have been cited by many authors. The Council of Scientific and Industrial Research, the apex agency of the Government of India for scientific research, awarded him the Shanti Swarup Bhatnagar Prize for Science and Technology, one of the highest Indian science awards for his contributions to Medical Sciences in 1961, (Note: Long link - please select award year to see details) making him the first physician to receive the honour.

== Personal life ==
Arora was married to Urmila Arora and had two sons . Late Rakesh Arora and Late Attal Arora . His elder son Rakesh is survived by his wife Seema Arora and three children named Rashi, Aditi and Nihit Arora. Arora also has a great grand son named Advik Arora.

== Selected bibliography ==
- Singh TJ, Gupta OP, Tariq M, Arora RB (1970). "Effect of caffeine and coffee on serum cholesterol, free fatty acids and triglycerides levels in pigs". Indian J Med Res. 58 (1): 125–9. PMID 5439942.
- Seth SD, Arora RB, Guleria JS (1971). "Beneficial effect of hydrocortisone & hydrocortisone-antivenene combination in the treatment of Russell's viper envenomation". Indian J Exp Biol. 9 (2): 183–6. PMID 5092731.
- Arora RB, Bagchi N, Gupta OP (1972). "The effects of reserpine and propranolol on the therapeutic and toxic effects of peruvoside in the heart-lung preparation and intact dogs". Indian J Med Res. 60 (1): 143–52. PMID 5029118.
- Sharma JN, Arora RB (1973). "Arthritis in ancient Indian literature". Indian J Hist Sci. 8 (1–2): 37–42. PMID 11619600.
- Seth SD, Mukhopadhyay AB, Bagchi N, Prbhakar MC, Arora RB (1973). "Antihistaminic and spasmolytic effects of musk". Jpn J Pharmacol. 23 (5): 673–9. doi:10.1254/jjp.23.673. PMID 4148817.
