= Arora =

Community in India

- Religions: Hinduism • Sikhism
- Languages: Punjabi (Saraiki, Thali, Riasti, Pahari-Pothwari, Hindko), Sindhi, Hindustani
- Region: Contemporarily; Punjab (India) • Haryana • Delhi Historically; Derajat (Punjab • Balochistan • Khyber Pakhtunkhwa), Sindh and Pothohar Plateau
- Related groups: Khatri • Bhatia • Sood

Arora (Punjabi: Aroṛā, IPA: [əɾoːɽaː]) is a caste originating from Punjab and Sindh and comprising both Hindus and Sikhs. Their traditional occupations were shopkeeping, petty-business and moneylending in late pre-colonial and colonial times and even as of 2009 many were prominent shopkeepers in Punjab.

Historically, the Arora subgroup of the Khatri community had been principally found in western Punjab, in the districts to the south and west of Lahore. Scott Cameron Levi believes them to be a "sub-caste of the Khatris".

After the partition of India, Punjabis who migrated from western Punjab were mostly Khatris and Aroras. Studies reveal that "Arora Khatri, Bedi, Ahluwalia, etc. are some of the important castes among the Punjabis".

== Origin and varna ==
=== Origin ===
The name Arora has been suggested to be derived from the place of Aror in Sindh. According to W. H. McLeod, many Aroras originally came from the Pothohar area in northern Punjab.

=== Varna ===
Within Hinduism, their varna status is remains a subject of dispute. According to the University of Utah sociologist, Bam Dev Sharda, in the "status allocation in village India", the Aroras are considered a mercantile caste belonging to the Vaishya varna, like the Khatris, Agarwal, Bania and Ahluwalia, and they claim "twice-born" status.

In the opinion of Agehananda Bharati, the merchant-type castes such as the Rajasthani Baniyas, Agarwals, Guptas, Mittals, Goels are twice-born castes. However, in Punjab, there is a large number of merchant type jatis, "Arora" being their generic name, both Hindu and Sikh, and they are not twice-born. Yet they share about the same status in the wide regional ranking. He calls this "deferred caste denial" which he explains as the rule that "hierarchy persists in the Hindu mind even where caste is denied in any of the senses and by any of the strategies adumbrated".

In the opinion of Gurmukh Ram Madan, a professor of sociology at University of Lucknow, "every Hindu is supposed to have a caste" and Aroras (including its sub-castes) are identified as a sub-division of the Khatris. It is noted that "whether Khattris belong to Kshatriya varna or Vaishya varna is a point of controversy". According to Ethne K. Marenco, the Jat Sikhs were placed at the top in the Sikh caste hierarchy, above the Khatri and Arora Sikhs. In contrast, per the Hindu traditions, "the Khatris and Aroras were accorded Kshatriya status", while "the status of the Jat Sikhs was equated with that of Shudras".

According to Christophe Jaffrelot, majority of the male members of the Arya Samaj in the late 19th century Punjab came from the Arora and Khatri merchant castes. He cites N. G. Barrier to show that the philosophy of the Arya Samaj founder, Dayananda Saraswati, was responsible for the aspirations of these Vaishya castes from Punjab to higher status:

Dayananda's claim that caste should be determined primarily by merit not birth, opened new paths of social mobility to educated Vaishyas who were trying to achieve social status commensurate with their improving economic status

According to the University of Toronto anthropologist, Nicola Mooney, the Aroras are of Kshatriya varna, along with the Khatris. Similarly, Grant Evans describes Arora as a "sub-group of the Khatri jati of the Kshatriya Varna". According to one legend, the Aroras are of Kshatriya stock.

== History ==
On 13 April 1752, Lahore and Multan in Punjab were annexed by Ahmad Shah Durrani after the death of Kaura Mal, an Arora or Khatri of Shorkot in the battlefield and retreat of Adina Beg. Afghanistan was the conduit for the trade between Central Asia and India. Grain trade in Afghanistan was in the hands of the Punjabi Hindu Arora/Khatris. Reportedly, they gave loans to the Durrani rulers to carry out military expeditions in India. Moreover, the disappointed princes of India "encouraged Zaman Shah Durrani to invade the subcontinent and overthrow the British" in 1798.

To restrict the Afghans in Punjab, Hindu Diwan Kaura Mal Arora "died while fighting against the army of Ahmed Shah Durrani on March 6, 1752". He was the Governor of Multan and had also served as the Minister of Lahore twice. Earlier, he led the Lahore Darbar and "made a joint-attack on Multan in 1749", along the Sikhs led by Jassa Singh. Post his victory over Multan, "Diwan Kaura Mall was given the title of Maharaja Bahadur" by the Mughals.

Prior to the British colonial rule, Aroras were one of the three main money-lending castes of Punjab. The Aroras were often subjected to humiliation by peasant communities of Punjab. They could not wear a turban and only granted permission to ride on a donkey.

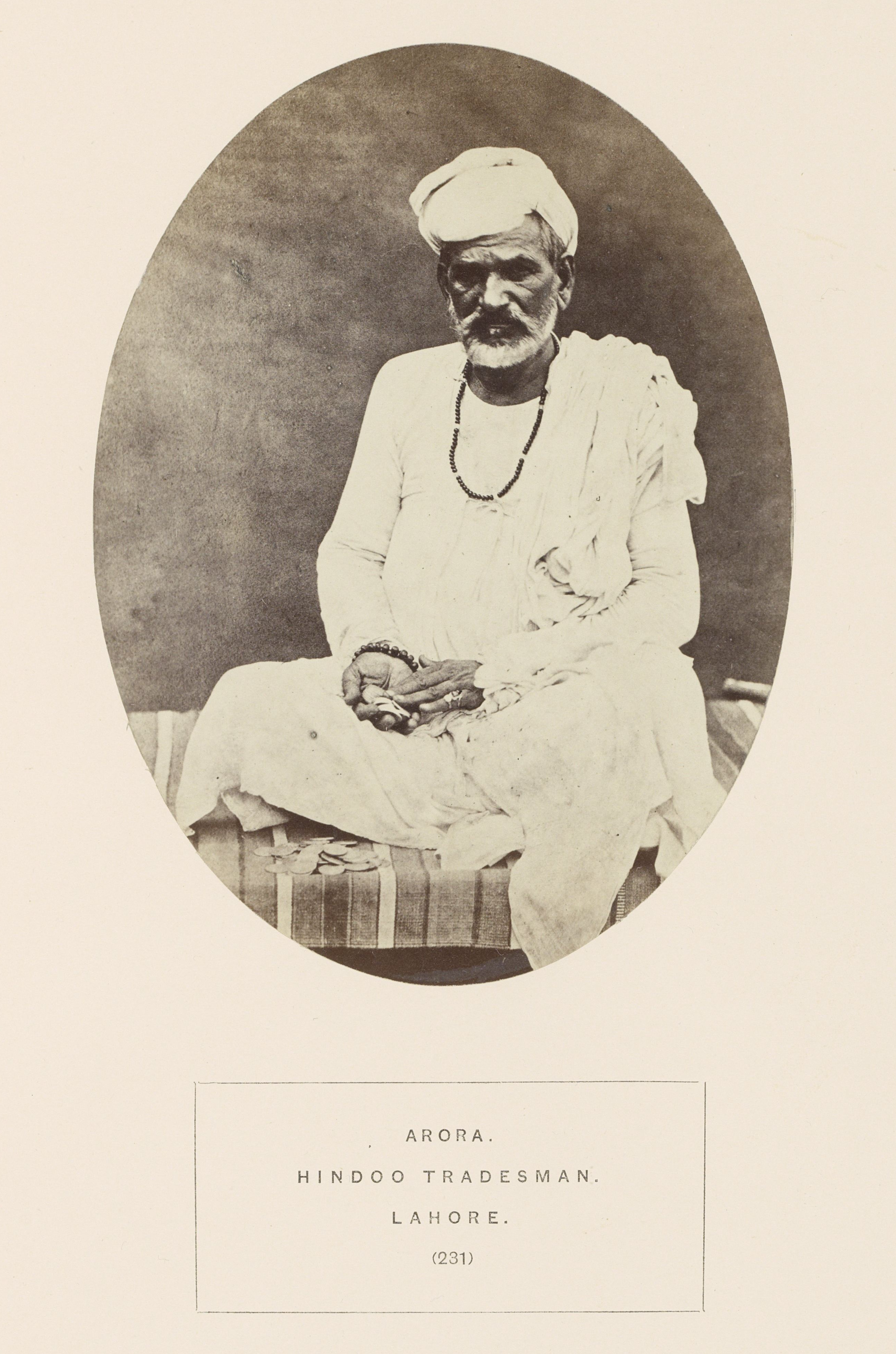
Portrait of an unidentified Arora Storekeeper from Lahore with coins in hand and in front of him, ca.1862–72.

Pettigrew notes that in the 19th century, the Aroras were working as shopkeepers and small traders. They were centered in Multan and Derajat regions during the British Raj, in some parts of Punjab their population was so high that they had to seek employment outside their traditional occupations shopkeeping, accountancy and money-lending For the Hindu merchant castes, Agarwal Banias, Khatris and Aroras, timber trade was also one of the trades they followed before 1900. However, since 1900 the smallest merchant sect, the Suds, started this trade and later dominated it in eastern Punjab.

The Amritsar Gazetteer (1976) stated:

Aroras trace their origin from the Khatris. It is said that Khatris are Khatris of Lahore and Multan, whereas Aroras are Khatris of Aror, modern Rori and Sukkar (Sind) in Pakistan. There is a street in Amritsar named as ‘Arorianwali Gali’. The Aroras seem to have settled in Amritsar during the time of Maharaja Ranjit Singh or even earlier. It is presumed that they migrated to Amritsar from Lahore to which place they might have originally migrated from Sind or Multan.

The Hoshiarpur Gazetteer stated:

Before independence, the Aroras did not constitute a sizeable population in the district. With the migration of the non-Muslim population from Pakistan to India in 1947, they settled here, though in small numbers. The Aroras were generally settled in West Punjab (Pakistan) and in the Firozepur District. Their representation in the eastern districts of the Punjab was not notable. Whatever be their origin, the fact is that they resemble Khatris in certain traits. They are also divided into many groups and castes, Uchanda, Nichanda, etc., but in social life, these groups are of no importance. They intermarry in their groups like others. They also intermarry among Khatris. In the All-India meeting in 1936, held by the Khatris at Lahore (Pakistan), it was decided that the Aroras, Soods and Bhatias were Khatri for all intents and purposes. And, as such, they should be admitted to the Khatri stock. This interpretation did not find much favour then, but with the lapse of time, it has almost been accepted.

According to the Commission Reports by Justice Gurnam Singh (1990) and Justice K. C. Gupta (2012), Arora is a forward caste socially, educationally and economically. It was reported that "despite of being uprooted from their homeland", Arora community has high literacy rate. An economic survey conducted by Maharishi Dayanand University states that Arora/Khatri people have good representation both in government as well as private sector. They are both in business, services and other fields. They are "economically well-off and not dependent on money-lending or shopkeeping". They are engaged as "doctors, engineers, administrators and are represented in white-collar jobs". The Arora were divided in two main sub groups, namely Hindu Arora and Sikh Arora depending upon the religion pursued.

As of 2009, many Aroras were prominent shopkeepers in several cities of Punjab including Amritsar. McLeod adds that they played prominent role in the Singh Sabha movement. Aroras such as Vir Singh and Mehtab Singh (Note: Mehtab Singh, a Sikh Arora, was an eminent political leader in the early 20th century.) were influential within the Sikh community.

Punita Arora became the first lady Lieutenant General of the Indian Army in 2004.

In the 2022 Punjab Legislative Assembly election, 11 legislatures in the majority government, come from Arora community.

== Social organization ==
The Arora are divided into four territorial groups: the Uttarādhīs from the north (Lahore and northern Punjab), the Ḍakhaṇās from the south (Gujarat), the Dāhrās and Sindhīs from Sindh. The Dāhrās and Ḍakhaṇās are sometimes classed as one groups.

In the census of 1951, Aroras that were settled in Punjab returned their caste names as Khatris, Arora Khatris, Arorae, Rore, Aror, Rora Khatris, Arore, Aror Khatris etc. Some of the Aroras simply returned their caste names with Arora sub-caste names such as Arya, Ahuja, Batheja, Bathla, Kukreja, Chawla, Chhabra, Dang, Juneja, Taneja, Upneja, Wadhwa etc.

== Culture ==
W. H. McLeod notes that marriages between Aroras and the Khatris are common.

Before the independence of India, Arora used to marry in their own sub-group i.e. Uttradhi, Dakkhna or Dahra but after the independence, spheres of permissible arranged matrimonial alliances were widened to include other sub-groups of Arora.

In Bahawalpur State, Aroṛās were religious followers of Śrī Lālajī, Guñjamālī, the Tailaṅga Gokula Gosāṁīs, or Nānak-panthīs.

In a study of cultural geography and pilgrimage in India, it was recorded that "Khatri-Aroras are surely among the most numerous Hindu caste groups" in the areas of Indian Punjab and Delhi. Khatri-Arora along with Brahmins and mercantile castes "dominated the total mass of pilgrims" at Badrinath Temple. Similarly, the total number of pilgrims at Haridwar and Jwalaji were also predominated by the Khatri-Arora. At Chintapurni pilgrimage, the Arora were found to be the numerically dominant pilgrim group particularly during the Shravana Ashtami fair.

== See also ==
- Arora (surname)
