= Sudha Arora =

Indian Author (born 1946)

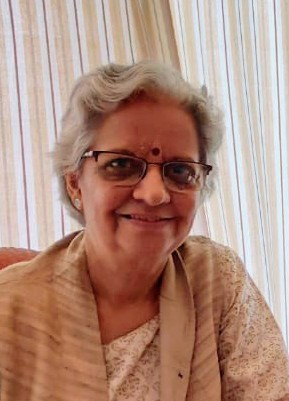
- Born: 4 October 1946 (age 79); Lahore, Punjab Province, British India
- Writing career
- Language: Hindi,
- Genres: Short Story, Novel, Play

Sudha Arora (born in 1946) is an Indian author who writes in Hindi. She has published over 100 short stories, novels, and plays. Her works have been widely translated into various Indian and foreign languages. Some of them have also been adapted for television and stage. Her first story was published in September, 1965. She is a recipient of numerous local awards for her stories as well as for her contributions to Indian feminist literature in Hindi.

== Biography ==
Born in 1946 in pre-independence Lahore (West Pakistan), Sudha Arora is an eminent Indian writer in Hindi. Her forte is the short story genre and she has over 100 stories to her credit. Her works have been widely translated into various Indian and foreign languages. Some of them have also been adapted for television and stage. Her first collection of stories "Bagair Tarashe Hue" was published in 1967. She has published several collections of short stories. Her collection "Yuddhaviram" won a special award of excellence from the Uttar Pradesh Hindi Sansthaan. She is considered one of the foremost feminist writers in Hindi in India.

Sudha holds a Masters Degree in Hindi literature. A Gold Medalist from University of Calcutta, Sudha Arora was a Lecturer in Ashutosh College and Shri Shikshayatan College in Calcutta from 1969-71.

Sudha Arora lives in Mumbai, India where she continues to work as a freelance writer and journalist. She is the founder director of Vasundhara, an organization dedicated to the promotion of books in Indian languages.

== Bibliography ==
=== Short story collections ===
- Bagair Tarashe Hue (Lokbharati Prakashan - 1967)
- Yuddhaviram (Parag Prakashan - 1977)
- Mahanagar ki Maithili (National Publishing House - 1987)
- Kaala Shukravaar (Rajkamal Prakashan - 2004)
- Kaanse ka Gilaas (Aadhaar Prakashan - 2005)
- Meri Terah kahaniyan (Abhiruchi Prakashan - 2006)
- Rahogi Tum Wohi (Remadhav Prakashan - 2007)
- 21 Shreshtha Kahaniyan (Diamond Books - 2009)
- Ek Aurat : Teen Bataa Chaar (Bodhi Prakashan - 2011)
- Meri Priya Kathayen (Jyotiparv Prakashan - 2012)
- 10 Pratinidhi Kahaniyan (Kitaabghar Prakashan - 2013)
- Annapurna Mandal ki Aakhiri Chitthi (Sahitya Bhandaar - 2014)
- But Jab Bolte Hain (Lokbharati Prakashan – 2015)
- Chuni hui Kahaniyan (Aman Prakashan – 2017)
- Karwachathi Aurat (Bodhi Prakashan – 2023)
- Katha Saptak (Shivna Prakashan – 2023)
- Aamar Naam Damanchakra (Sambhavna Prakashan - 2022)

=== Novel ===
- Yahin Kahin tha Ghar (Samayik Prakashan - 2010)

=== Play ===
- Odd Man Out urf Biradari Baahar(rajkamal Prakashan - 2100)

=== Poetry collections ===
- Rachenge Hum Sajha Itihaas (Medha Books - 2012)
- Kam Se Kam Ek Darwaza (Bodhi Prakashan - 2015)

=== Nonfiction ===
- Aam Aurat: Zinda Sawaal (Samayik Prakashan - 2008, a compilation of articles based on experiences in grassroot-level work with women)
- Ek Aurat ki Notebook (Manav Prakashan – 2010; Reprint by Rajkamal Prakashan – 2015)
- Saankal - Sapne aur Sawaal (Lokbharati Prakashan – 2019)

=== Translations ===
- Wekh Dhiyan de Lekh (Unistar Books - 2015, novel in Punjabi by Rabinder Singh Batth)
- Rahogi Tum Wohi (Kitaab Daar – 2008, short stories in Urdu, translated by Haider Jafri Syed)
- Umbarthyachya Alyad Palyad (Manovikas Prakashan - 2012, compilation of feminist articles in Marathi by Dr Vidyagauri Gokhale)
- Maithili chi Goshth (Prajakt Prakashan - 2015, short stories by Chandrakant Bhonjal)
- Samudrateel Walwant(Anagha Prakashan - 2021, short stories by Vasudha Sahstrabuddhe)

=== Edited books ===
- Aurat ki Kahani (Vaundhara Prakashan 2002; Reprint by Bharatiya Gyanpeeth - 2008)
- Dahleez ko Langhate Hue and Pankhon ki Udaan (for Sparrow - Sound & Picture Archives for Research on Women - 2003, oral history of the struggle of women in different fields)
- Mannu Bhandari – Srijan ke Shikhar (Kitaabghar - 2010)
- Mannu Bhandari ka Rachnatmak Awadaan (Kitaabghar - 2011)
- Stree Samvedna: Vimarsh ke Nikash: Two Volumes (Sahitya Bhandar - 2015)

=== Stories adapted for stage and telefilms ===
- Yuddhviram – A short film for Mumbai Doordarshan in 1977 by T.N.Mohan
- Dahleez par Samvad - A short film for Lucknow Doordarshan in 1978 by Rajan Sabbarwal
- Itihaas Dohrata Hai - A short film for Kolkata Doordarshan in 1986 by Susheel Gupta
- Jankinama - A short film for Prasar Bharati in 2005 by Ravi Raj
- Rahogi Tum Wohi - Telecast by Pakistani TV Channel 'Hum TV' as a 4 episode drama in 2013.
- Rahogi Tum Wohi - staged by Bhopal, Wardha, Dehradun, Indore, Kolkata and Mumbai University students.
- Rahogi Tum Wohi - adapted as a street play by Experimental Theatre of London and enacted by renowned actor Saeed Jaffrey at Nehru Centre, London, adapted and staged at University of Turin (Italy) and Prague (Czechoslovakia) by Dr Dagmar Markova.

== Awards ==
- Uttar Pradesh Hindi Sansthan (1978)
- Bharat Nirman Award (2008)
- Priydarshini Samman (2011)
- Kendriya Hindi Nideshalay Samman (2011)
- Maharshtra Sahitya Academy Award (2012)
- Vagmani Samman (2014)
- Maharshtra Sahitya Academy (2014)
- Mira Smriti Samman(2016)
- Munshi Premchand Katha Samman(2018)
- Acharya Ramchandra Shukla Samman(2020)
