= Ashish Arora =

Indian structural biologist

- Born: Rajasthan, India
- Education: Rajasthan University; University of Virginia
- Known for: Studies on the pathogenesis of tuberculosis and visceral leishmaniasis
- Awards: 2010 NASI Prof. B. K. Bachhawat Memorial Young Scientist Award; 2011 N-BIOS Prize
- Scientific career
- Fields: Structural biology
- Workplaces: Central Drug Research Institute
- Doctoral advisor: Dr. C M Gupta

Ashish Arora is an Indian structural biologist and a senior scientist at Central Drug Research Institute. He did his postgraduate studies at Rajasthan University and post-doctoral work at the Max Planck Institute for Biophysical Chemistry, Goettingen, and University of Virginia, Charlottesville, VA, before joining the Central Drug Research Institute in 2002. He is known for his studies on Protein NMR Spectroscopy and the pathogenesis of diseases such as tuberculosis and visceral leishmaniasis, commonly known as Kala Azar and has delivered invited speeches at various seminars. The Department of Biotechnology of the Government of India awarded him the National Bioscience Award for Career Development, one of the highest Indian science awards, for his contributions to biosciences, in 2011. He is also a recipient of the 2010 Prof. B. K. Bachhawat Memorial Young Scientist Award of the National Academy of Sciences, India.

== Selected bibliography ==
- Kabra, Ashish; Shahid, Salman; Pal, Ravi Kant; Yadav, Rahul; Pulavarti, S. V. S. Rama Krishna; Jain, Anupam; Tripathi, Sarita; Arora, Ashish (1 February 2017). "Unraveling the stereochemical and dynamic aspects of the catalytic site of bacterial peptidyl-tRNA hydrolase". RNA. 23 (2): 202–216. doi:10.1261/rna.057620.116. ISSN 1355-8382. PMC 5238795. PMID 28096445.
- Kabra, Ashish; Fatma, Farheen; Shahid, Salman; Pathak, Prem Prakash; Yadav, Rahul; Pulavarti, S.V.S.R. Krishna; Tripathi, Sarita; Jain, Anupam; Arora, Ashish (2016). "Structural characterization of peptidyl-tRNA hydrolase from Mycobacterium smegmatis by NMR spectroscopy". Biochimica et Biophysica Acta (BBA) - Proteins and Proteomics. 1864 (10): 1304–1314. doi:10.1016/j.bbapap.2016.06.013. PMID 27378575.
- Shukla, Vaibhav Kumar; Kabra, Ashish; Yadav, Rahul; Ono, Shoichiro; Kumar, Dinesh; Arora, Ashish (1 October 2015). "NMR assignments of actin depolymerizing factor (ADF) like UNC-60A and cofilin like UNC-60B proteins of Caenorhabditis elegans". Biomolecular NMR Assignments. 9 (2): 261–265. doi:10.1007/s12104-014-9588-5. ISSN 1874-2718. PMC 4465417. PMID 25503290.
