= Meenakshi TV =

- Country: India,
- Broadcast area: India,
- Headquarters: Chennai, Tamil Nadu, India

Programming
- Language: Tamil
- Picture format: 576i (SDTV),

Ownership
- Sister channels: Meenakshi

History
- Launched: 2015

Links
- Website: http://www.lyngsat.com/tvchannels/in/Meenakshi-TV.html

Meenakshi TV is a Tamil 24/7 television channel, owned by Meenakshi Networks Pvt ltd Chennai. The channel is free-to-air and was launched in 2015. The channel is available across all major cable and SCV setup box sd Chennal 260 as well as online.
