= Meenakshi Vijayakumar =

Indian academic and firefighter

Meenakshi Vijaykumar
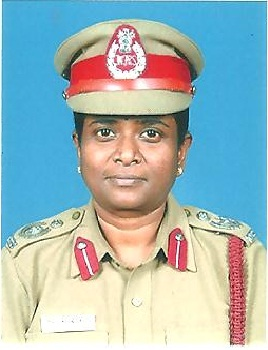
- Born: 10 September 1964 (age 62)
- Education: Ethiraj College for Women
- Occupations: Academic, Firefighter, Joint Director, First Woman Fire Officer
- Known for: One of the first Indian Woman fire officer appointed alongside Ms. Priya Ravichandran.

Meenakshi Vijaykumar is an Indian academic, firefighter, and one of the first Indian woman fire officer. Currently, she serves as the Joint Director at the State Training Center in Tambaram, Chennai. In 2013, she was awarded The President's Medal for Gallantry for saving two lives, and in 2019, she received The President's Medal for Meritorious Service.

Vijaykumar is also the first Indian Fire Officer to have won medals in the World Firefighter's Games and World Police and Fire Games held in South Korea, Australia, USA, and the Indian Fire Service Games held in Nagpur.

== Education ==
Vijaykumar completed her schooling at Bharath Senior Secondary School in Chennai. She pursued her undergraduate and postgraduate studies in English Literature at Ethiraj College, Chennai. Additionally, she obtained a PG diploma in Industrial Relation and Personnel Management from Bharatiya Vidya Bhavan, New Delhi in 1991. She furthered her education by completing a Bachelor of Education degree from Annamalai University in 1994. Vijaykumar has also undertaken Advanced Diploma courses at the National Fire Service College. She was awarded the certificate of "Graduate Member" by the Institute of Fire Engineers, India in 2008 and received the IFE Level 4 Certificate in Fire Science and Fire Safety (HL) from the Institute of Fire Engineers in Marton on Marsh, United Kingdom in 2014. She also obtained the NEBOSH International General Certificate in Occupational Health and Safety from the National Examination Board in Occupational Safety and Health, England in 2014. Additionally, she earned a Master of Business Administration (MBA) degree in 2017. She has completed her Doctor of Philosophy (P.hD) in FIRE AND ITS MULTIFACETED CONTEXTS in VELS University in 2022.

== Career ==
Vijaykumar began her career as an assistant professor in English at Chellamal College in Chennai in 1990. She later worked as a lecturer in Communication Technique at Father Agnel Institute of Management in New Delhi. In 1998, she cleared the Group 1 service exam but had to wait until 2003 for women officers to be included in the fire service. She served as the Divisional Fire Officer in north Chennai for four and a half years and suburban Chennai for one and a half years. Throughout her career, she has responded to over 400 fire and rescue calls. Vijaykumar actively participated in the rescue operations during the Tsunami disaster. She was also responsible for organizing fire safety programs in her division. She also played a significant role in organizing fire safety programs in her division and has trained more than 30 batches of fire officers from all over India.

In recognition of her bravery, Vijaykumar was awarded the President's Fire Service Medal for Gallantry in 2013. She frequently gives talks to encourage young Indian women to pursue careers in firefighting.

She is trained by the SPECIAL TASK FORCE in Sathiyamangalam in handling special disasters and to tackle special situations.

She has holding Additional Director (Administration) In charge in Tamil Nadu Fire and Rescue Services Department.

== Personal life ==
She is the daughter of P.K. Padhmanathan, former Joint Registrar of Co-operative Society, and Dr. V.S. Krishnakumari, former director of Children's Hospital in Egmore. She is the eldest granddaughter of Kakkan, a former minister.

== Honours and awards ==
Year	Name of award or honour	Awarding Organisation
1983	Kanchi Shankaracharya Medal (best outgoing student)	Ethiraj college
13.03.2005	Probas Club Award (First women fire officer)	Probas Club of Chennai
19.12.2005	Rotract Club Award	Rotract Club of Vepery
2005/2006	Rotary Award for vocational excellence	Rotary Club of Chennai
2012	Vijay TV Award	Vijay TV
08.03.2010	Ajanta Fine Arts Award	Ajanta Fine Arts
08.03.2013	Madras university Award	Madras university
23.07.2003	Indian Express Award	Indian Express
04.09.2004	Dinamalar award	Dinamalar
2010	Gold Medal, Woman's Grand master B Shot put	World 11th firefighters games Daegu Korea
2013	Mirchi Pudumai Penn Award	Radio Mirchi
2013	President's Gallantry Award	Government of India
2013	Excellence in Public Service	Just for woman magazine
07.03.2015	Woman Achiever award	Vels University, Chennai
2015	Appreciation Certificate for Meritorious Service during retrieval of Jarghand Girl from Sewage	The District Collector, Vellore
2015	Best Woman in the field of Fire Service	Vels University
26.01.2016	Appreciation Certificate for dedicated and selfless service rendered while carrying out the Rescue Relief Operations during CHENNAI FLOODS 2015	The District Collector, Kanchipuram
08.03.2016	Eminent Woman Achiever Award	Rajalakshmi Institute of Technology, Chennai
26.03.2016	Woman Achievers Awards	Raindropss, Chennai
2017	Won Two Bronze Medals for India in Badminton	World police and fire games, Los Angeles
Feb 2018	First Woman Fire Officer to have Won Five Medals in National Sports Meet - three gold medals, one silver medal and one bronze medal	National Fire Games, Nagpur
2017	Tamil Nadu Government Chief Minister's Anna Medal for Dedicated service in Fire and Rescue Services for unblemished services	Tamil Nadu Government
2018	Meritorious Service Award	Fire & Security Association of India
2018	"Sree Ratna" Award for dedicated, Innovative, totally involved, service for the community	Exnora International
2018	"Yuga Sakthi Puraskar" Award for Meritorious Achievement	The International Association of Lions Clubs
2019	SAKTHI AWARD for BRAVERY	PudhiyaThalaimurai News Channel
2019	JFW Awards for Dedication of Public Services	VBJ JFW Awards
2019	Won Five Medals for Tamil Nadu (Appreciation from Hon'ble Tamil Nadu Chief Minister)	Indian Fire Service Games, Nagpur
2021	President's Medal for Meritorious Service for unblemished service	Government of India
MARCH 8th 2021	Veera Thirumagal Award Received on WOMAN's DAY 2021	AIMED - Aachi Masala Proparator Tmt.THELMA
MARCH 26^{th} 2022	Women Achiever Award	Lions club of Madras Cathedral
March 19 2023	Phoenix Manithargal Award	NEWS7 Channel
