= Bhumika Arora =

Indian fashion model

- Born: 1991 or 1992 (age 34–35); New Delhi, India
- Occupation: Fashion Model
- Years active: 2012–present
- Modeling information
- Height: 5 ft 11 in (180 cm)
- Hair color: Black
- Eye color: Brown
- Agency: The Society Management (New York); Elite Model Management (Paris, Milan, London, Amsterdam, Barcelona, Copenhagen); MP Stockholm (Stockholm)

Bhumika Arora is an Indian fashion model. Bhumika was the February 2016 cover model and named the next Indian Supermodel by Vogue India.

Bhumika has appeared in editorials for American Vogue, British Vogue, Vogue India, Vogue Paris, Teen Vogue, Elle USA, Marie Claire Italia, i-D Magazine, Love Magazine, L'Officiel India, Interview Germany and UmnO Magazine. She walked her first international runway show in Paris for Dries Van Noten's fall/winter 2014/2015 collection. However, her breakout season was the Fall 2015 shows when she debuted at the New York Fashion Week walking for Alexander Wang. Three days later, she walked for Vera Wang and Vogue.com singled her out as No. 3 in its "7 Things We Loved Today". Following her debut at New York Fashion Week, Bhumika debuted at the London Fashion Week that season walking for Daks, Gareth Pugh, Jonathan Saunders, Preen and Simone Rocha before heading to Milan, where she walked in the Fendi show, walking for Karl Lagerfeld.

In between Fall 2015 and Fall 2016 season, Bhumika walked for major brands and designers such as Hermes, Chanel, Fendi, Versace, Jean Paul Gaultier, Kenzo, Dries Van Noten, Missoni, DSquared2, Manish Arora, Ferragamo, Etro, Roberto Cavalli, Dolce & Gabbana, Viktor & Rolf, Anna Sui, Alexander Wang, Emilio Pucci, Vera Wang, Bottega Veneta, Stella McCartney, Alberta Ferretti, Max Mara, 3.1 Phillip Lim, BCBG Max Azria, Gareth Pugh, H&M, Koché, Léa Peckre, Ports 1961, Brandon Maxwell, Derek Lam, Prabal Gurung, Fenty x Puma and Balmain. She notably fell twice during the finale of the H&M Fall/Winter 2016-2017 Ready-to-Wear fashion show.

She also walked for Karl Lagerfeld at Chanel's Cruise 2016/2017 show in Cuba which was staged at the iconic Paseo del Prado, a colonial boulevard, in Havana. She appeared in a short film, shot by Nick Knight for Dazed & Confused in celebration of NikeLab & Olivier Rousteing's collaboration alongside the designer himself, football star Cristiano Ronaldo and a host of other models.

== Early life ==
Bhumika Aurora studied a Bachelor of Business Administration from Chandigarh. Bhumika made her international debut aged 26 for Dries Van Noten in 2014. However, she is notable for her 2015 Fall/Winter fashion season where she was an Alexander Wang semi-exclusive, walking a total of 25 shows for Fall/Winter 2015.
