= Ramesh Juneja =

Indian businessperson (born 1955)

R. C. Juneja
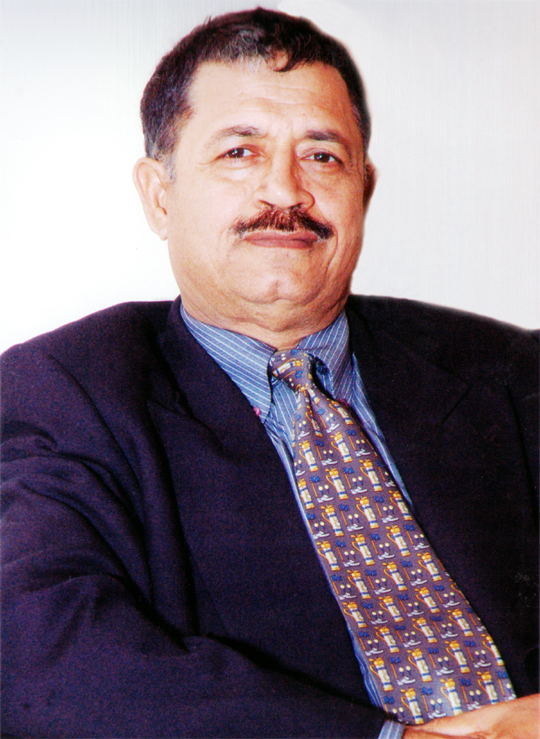
- Born: Ramesh C. Juneja; 28 July 1955 (age 70)
- Title: Founder & Chairperson of Mankind Pharma

Ramesh C. Juneja (born 28 July 1955) is an Indian billionaire businessman and the Chairman of Mankind Pharma. He is one of the 100 richest Indians as per Forbes; his net worth was estimated to be $2.3 billion in 2019.

== Career ==
After completing his graduation in science, he started his career in 1974 with KeePharma Ltd., working as a medical representative. In 1975, he joined Lupin Limited and worked there as first line manager for almost 8 years.

In 1983, he resigned from Lupin and started his own company Bestochem in Partnership. In 1994, he withdrew his ownership from Bestochem and in 1995 incepted Mankind Pharma along with his younger brother Rajeev Juneja with an investment of ₹50 lakhs and an initial team of 25 Medical Representatives.

== Associations ==
R. C. Juneja holds distinguished positions in various pharmaceutical bodies of India. He is the chairman of the Federation of Pharma Entrepreneurs (FOPE) and is also the chairman of Himachal Pradesh – UK State Board for IDMA (Indian Drug Manufacturers Association).

== Awards and achievements ==
He was accorded with Business Icon Pharma Award by Network 18 in the year 2011. He was also one of the members out of the four business magnates nominated for 'Business Leader of the Year Award' in the 5th Annual Pharmaceutical Leadership Summit and Asia Business Leadership Award, 2012.
