= Sagari Chhabra =

Indian writer and film director

- Born: New Delhi, India
- Occupation: Writer

Sagari Chhabra is an Indian writer and film director. She has written and directed fifteen documentary films and one fiction film, winning five national and international awards.

== Films, awards ==
New Delhi-based Chhabra's work focusses on social issues. Some of her films are Global Warming (awarded United Nations World Food Day award and produced by The Energy Resource Institute (TERI)), Now I Will Speak (this 40-minute film is on custodial rape, child rape and rape as a tool of oppression on violence against women, and it won an award from the International Association's Women in Radio & Television and NIFA awards of excellence in production and direction), Tatva (Essence) (a fiction film about a woman in search for herself and her identity in contemporary India that was awarded the Rajat Kamal, an Indian national award).

Chhabra's other work includes Hunger in the Time of Plenty and The Word and the World (on Indian writers), among others. Hunger in the Time of Plenty, which is directed and co-produced by Chhabra, deals with starvation deaths at the time of food surplus in India. The film-maker meets families where there has been a starvation death and seeks to find out the condition of the other family members. The film has been shot in the deserts of Rajasthan, the lush tropical forests of Orissa and in the Indian capital city of New Delhi.

Asli Azaadi (True Freedom) is a 45-minute film, directed and produced by Chhabra that deals with the contribution of women freedom fighters in India's struggle for freedom from British imperialism. Shot on location, where many historical events took place, the film is infused with music and archival footage and ends with the "struggle for true freedom today", in the words of the film-maker. The film has been selected for screenings at the Golden Gate Festival, San Francisco, and Norwegian Film Festival, among others.

== Screenings ==
She has screened films and conducted workshops at universities in Yale, Chicago, Malaysia, Myanmar and Delhi. Her films have been screened at festivals in Copenhagen, Oslo, Umeå, San Francisco, Melbourne, Adelaide, Perth, Miami, among other places.

== Themes, writings ==
Sagari Chhabra has written on themes that include inter-religious strife and violence (called "communalism") in India, hunger, and human rights. She has been published in South Asian Refugee Watch, Mainstream, The Book Review and The Times of India, among others.

She is the author of The Professional Woman's Dreams, a former columnist on cinema and a writer for children. Her children's book The Elephant Without A Passport was short-listed by the International Chitrakatha Writing Competition, from entries across the world. Her creative writing, poetry and short stories have been published by the Sahitya Akademi's Indian Literature and The Little Magazine, a publication of alternative writing in India.

== TATV, archive of the freedom struggle ==
Chhabra who runs Towards Alternative Thought and Vision (TATV) from New Delhi's Defence Colony holds post-graduate degrees from Washington State University, where she was a pre-doctoral teaching associate, teaching Communication to under-graduate students, and the University of Delhi. In 2004, she was awarded the Asia Fellowship and spent a year in Myanmar, Malaysia and Singapore researching the surviving Indian freedom fighters in South-East Asia. She lives in New Delhi and is currently engaged in creating the region's first audio, photo and video archive of the freedom struggle.
