= Sanjay Arora =

Indian filmmaker and Actor

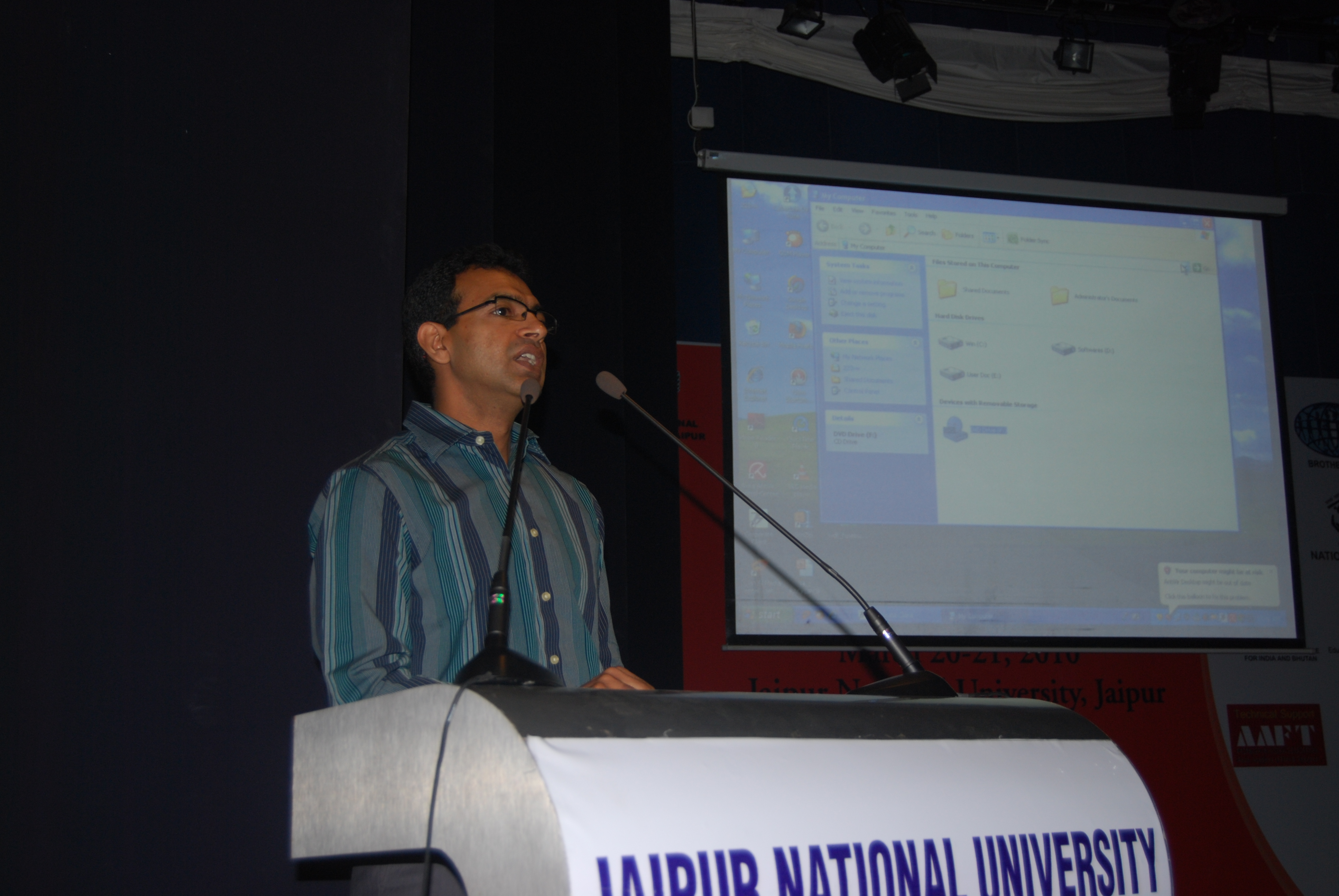
- Sanjay Arora at Jaipur University, India, cultural film festival
- Born: Kurukshetra, India
- Occupations: Filmmaker, actor

Sanjay Arora is an Indian filmmaker and Actor. He is known for making films such as Expression, Chase, Butterfly Wings, Once Again.

== Early life ==
Sanjay Arora was born in Kurukshetra, India. As a child, he loved watching Hindi films and acting in skits and plays. He started as a host at All India Radio, and hosted many programs targeting Indian youth. He did his schooling from Senior Model School, Kurukshetra and went ahead to do Electronics Engineering at D.C.R. University of Science and Technology in Haryana and graduated with a bachelor's degree. After this, he pursued a postgraduate degree in Export Marketing and Management from Kurukshetra University. He moved to Detroit, Michigan in 1999, and started working as a software engineer. Even though he was working as a software engineer, his passion was always in acting and film making. He studied filmmaking & direction at New York Film Academy in New York City. He attended the India Today Acting School in Toronto, where he was trained by Roshan Taneja.

== Film career ==
Arora invested the money that he made from his engineering career during his time in the United States into producing and directing a short film called “Butterfly Wings”. It is based on a true story of a physically disabled woman. The film was shot in Delhi with Indian and American actors. The film was featured at the We Care Film Festival in 2011 and was screened in 15 cities in India including Delhi, Mumbai, Allahabad, Jaipur, Goa, and Gurgaon. Special shows were also held in the United Nations Information Center, New Delhi and the BHEL manufacturing plant in Haridwar. The film was also screened at the International Disability Film Festival 2011 in Calgary, Canada, the West Virginia Filmmaker Festival 2011 in West Virginia, United States, and the Trinity Film Coalition Film Festival 2011 in Detroit, Michigan, United States.

=== Other films ===
Once Again (Hindi: Phir vehi), which was inspired from a teaching of the Buddha, was screened at Delhi International Film Festival. Expression, as the name suggests, is about expressing internal feelings without verbal language. This film demonstrates that language is not a barrier in love. The film is centered on the relationship between Karan, an American-born Indian from America, and Sonya, a Russian bartender in Moscow. It was shot in Detroit, United States, with Indian and Russian actors, and was screened in the ICE short film festival, Pune, and the World Music & Independent Film Festival (WMIFF) 2012. Chase is about a young man actively seeks happiness. Happiness eludes him, but keeps on dropping hints. It was shot in New York City.

== Filmography ==
- Expression (2006) (short film) – producer, actor, director
- Chase (2008) (short film) producer, director
- Butterfly Wings (2010) (Short Film) producer, director
- Shuttlecock Boys (2011), assistant director
- Once Again (2012) producer, writer and director
- Once Upon A Time In Lahore (2023) (short film) executive -producer
- 2 Khet (Two Farms) -2024 executive producer
- You are Early (2024) co producer

== Awards and nominations ==
2 Khet (Two Farms)

- Won Best Director in Short Film Award in South Asian International Film Festival of Florida, 2025

Once Upon a Time in Lahore

- Best Short Film and Best Actor in Short Film in India International Film Festival of Boston (IIFFB)], 2024 (USA)
- Best Director, Best Post-Production, Best Ensemble cast in FFTG Awards New York, 2023 (USA)

Butterfly Wings

- Honorable Mention award at the Bayou City Inspirational Film Festival (BCIFF) 2011 in Houston, Texas.
- 2nd prize for the Best Film at the Global Film Festival, Noida (India).
- Nominated for the Best feature film, Screenplay and Best Supporting Role Actress in feature film at the World Music & Independent Film Festival (WMIFF) 2011, Washington D.C.
- Nominated for the Best Screenplay in a feature film, Best Director and Best Actress in a feature film at The Hot Media International Film Festival (HIMFF) 2012 in Maryland (USA).
- Award of Merit for Short Film at the Accolade Film Competition 2013, USA.
- Honorable Mention Award at the International Film Festival of Spirituality, Religion and Visionary 2013.

Once Again

- Official selection at the Delhi International Film Festival 2012.
- Nominated for the Best Screenplay at the Hot Media International Film Festival 2012.
- Official Selection at the Trinity International Film Festival 2013, Detroit, USA.
- Won Best film award in Religious/Spiritual category at the Great Lakes International Film Festival 2013.
- Won Best Screenplay Award at the Free Spirit Film Festival 2013, India.
- Honorable Mention award at the International Film Festival for Peace, Inspiration & Equality (IFFPIE) 2013 in Jakarta, Indonesia.
- 3rd prize winner at the 6th Boomtown Film & Music Festival 2013, Texas.
- Nominated or the Best South East Asian Film and Best Director at the World Music & Independent Film Festival 2013, Washington D.C.
- Honorable Mention Award at the International Film Festival of Spirituality, Religion and Visionary 2013.
- Won "Silver Award - Short film competition" at the 2014 California Film Awards, USA.
- Won "Royal Reel Award" at the Canada International Film Festival 2014.
