= Meenakshi Pahuja =

Indian academic and marathon swimmer

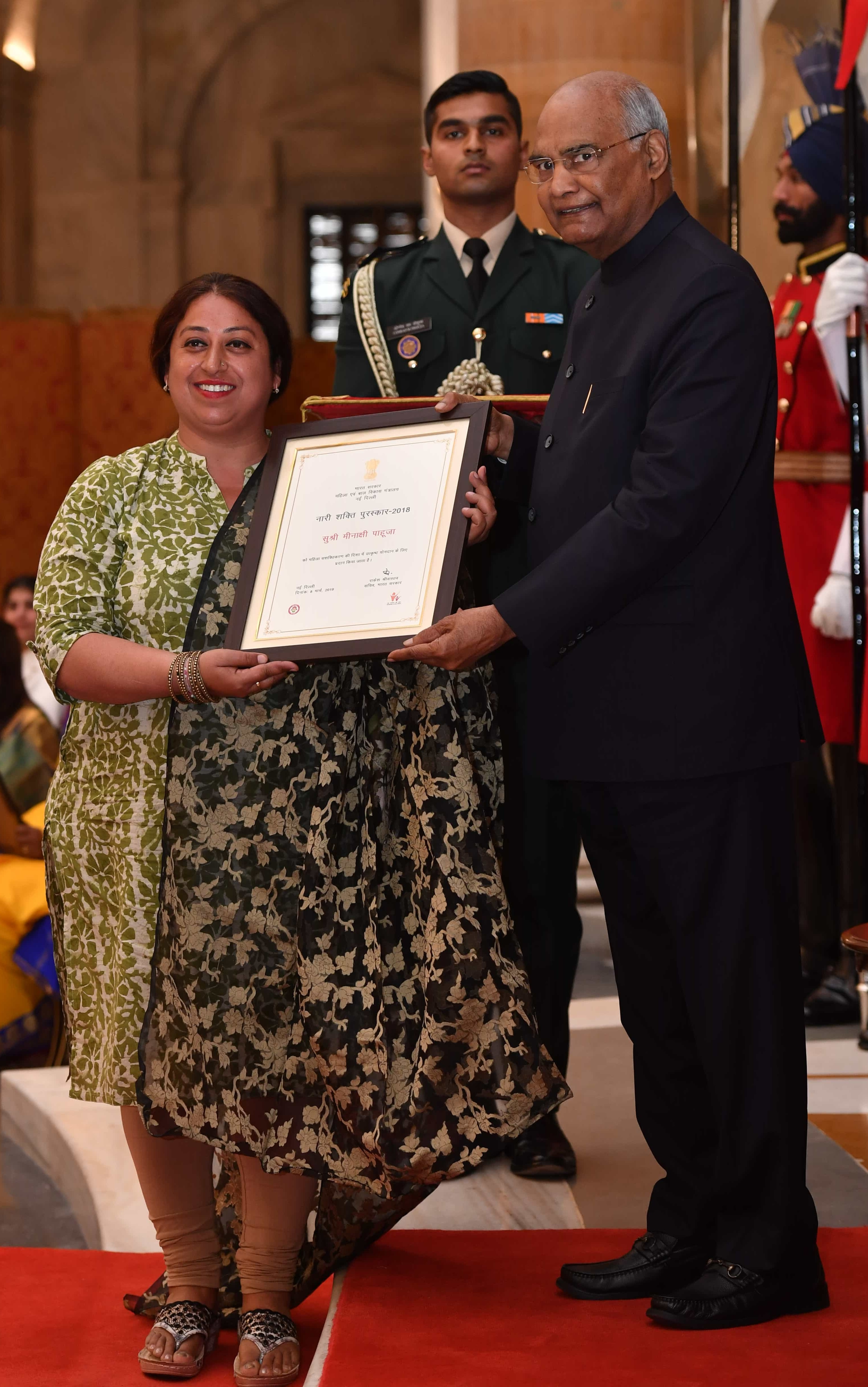
- Meenakshi Pahuja receiving a 2018 Nari Shakti Puraskar award

Personal information
- Born: 1978 (age 47–48) Delhi, India

Sport
- Sport: Swimming

Meenakshi Pahuja (born 1978) is an Indian lecturer and marathon swimmer. After a successful career as a competitive swimmer, she became a teacher at Lady Shri Ram College, and later entered open water swimming. She received a 2018 Nari Shakti Puraskar award.

== Early life ==
Meenakshi Pahuja was born in 1978 and grew up in Delhi, the oldest of three children. Her father V. K. Pahuja taught swimming at the Modern School. She first entered swimming competitions at the age of five and became a junior age group national champion in the 50 metres breaststroke before she turned nine.

== Career ==
Representing India, Pahuja won a medal in the 400 metres Individual Medley at the 1996 Asia Pacific Age Group swimming championships in Pusan, South Korea. She was a three-time champion at the national games. In 2001, she retired from swimming and became a lecturer in Physical Training at the Lady Shri Ram College, part of the University of Delhi.

In August 2006, Pahuja started marathon swimming. She participated in a 19-km event over the Bhagirathi-Hooghly river in Murshidabad, West Bengal. She then travelled to Switzerland to compete in the 2007 Lake Zürich Swim (26.4 km from Rapperswil to Zürich proper), where she was the fifth-place female finisher. She was financially supported by her father and the Vice-Chancellor of Delhi University, Deepak Pental.

Pahuja has tried twice to swim the English Channel. Her first attempt was in 2008. One week before arriving in Dover, she competed in an 81-km championship over the Bhagirathi-Hooghly River; although she dealt with "muddy water and river snakes", she finished in 12 hours and 27 minutes. However, as she was not experienced with ocean swimming, she struggled with the current in the channel and withdrew after 11 km due to seasickness. Pahuja made her second attempt in 2014, again starting from the English side. After she had swum 40 km in 14 hours and 19 minutes, she was forced to return due to changing tides. She was 3 km away from completion.

Pahuja was the first Indian to swim around Key West in Florida and to complete the Lake Travis Solo in Texas. She also was the first Indian to complete the Tex Robertson Highland Lakes Challenge, where she swam five lakes in five days: Lake Buchanan, Inks Lake, Lake LBJ, Lake Marble Falls, and Lake Travis. She is the second-fastest female finisher among the Indian participants in the Robben Island-Bloubergstrand course (7.4 km). She won a bronze medal in the 2012 Labuan Sea Cross race in Malaysia and finished third in the 2014 Manhattan Island Marathon Swim in New York City. She is entered in the Limca Book of Records as the first Indian swimmer to cross Lake Constance in the Alps.

In an interview, Pahuja has listed four major challenges that open-water swimmers should be prepared to face: weather conditions, sea life, endurance, and mental tenacity. She encountered a corpse in one of her river races at Murshidabad, which she mistook for a competitor until it collided with a scout boat.

Pahuja has spoken of the need to increase public and government support for Indian athletes, especially female athletes. She was a co-producer of the short film "Break The Taboo. Period". She has also promoted improved school facilities for disabled children.

Due to COVID-19 restrictions, many Indian swimmers faced restricted access to practice facilities. Pahuja increased her advocacy of the Indian swim community, writing news articles about athletes planning to participate in the upcoming Summer Olympics and arguing for increased access to facilities (maintaining distancing and sanitary guidelines).

== Awards ==
Pahuja received a 2018 Nari Shakti Puraskar award (India's highest civilian award for women) from President Ram Nath Kovind.
