= Udai Prakash Arora =

Indian historian

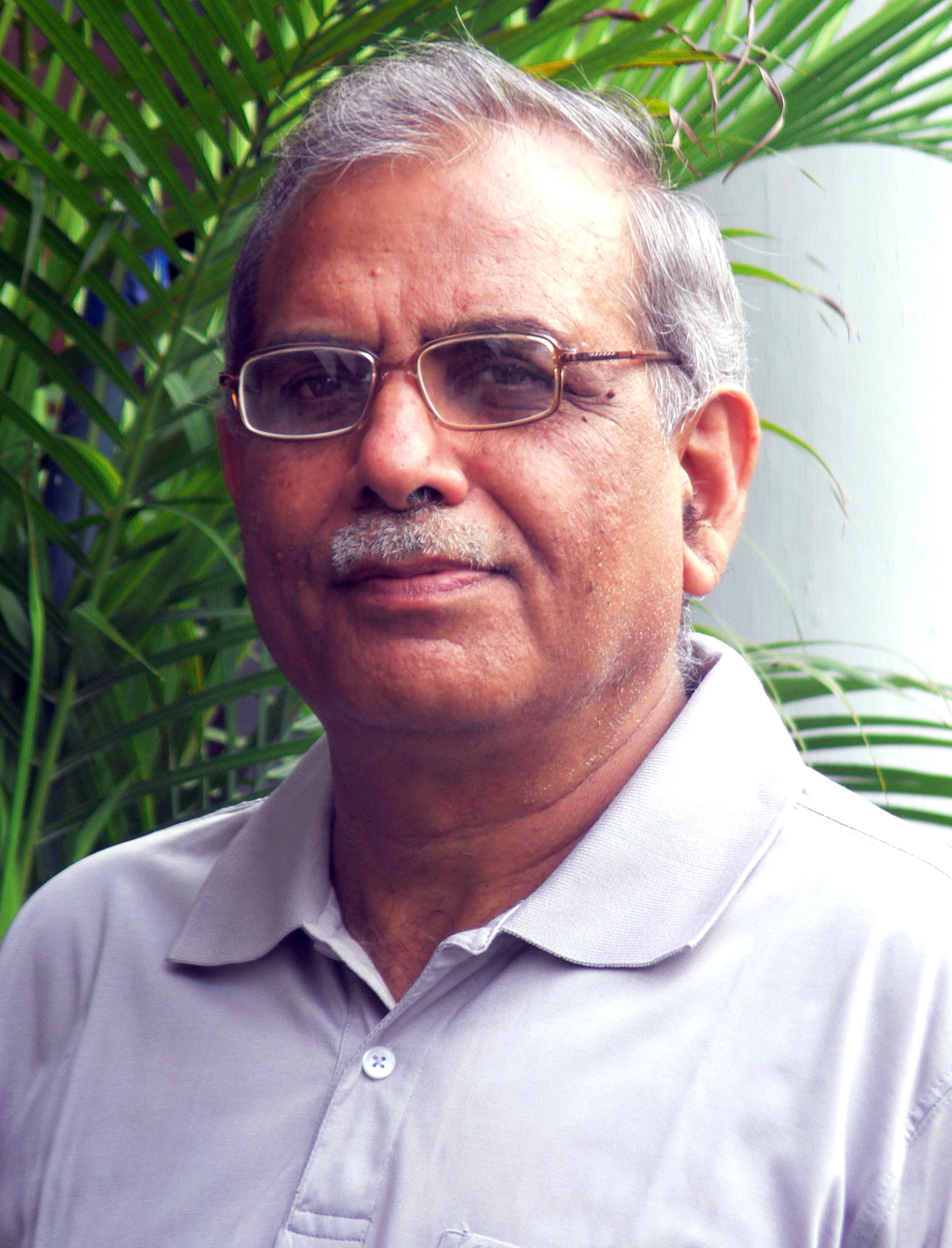
- Prof. Udai Prakash Arora
- Born: 1944 (age 81–82); India

Academic work
- Institutions: Allahabad University; Jawaharlal Nehru University

Udai Prakash Arora (born 1944) is an Indian Historian well known for his pioneering works in the field of Graeco-Indian Studies.

== Career ==
He started his teaching career at Allahabad University (1965–1985). Thereafter, he was Professor and Founder Head, Department of Ancient History and Culture, MJP Rohilkhand University, Bareilly (1985–2006), where he also acted as Pro Vice Chancellor (1995) and twice as Acting Vice Chancellor (1996–2006). In 2006, he was invited by Jawaharlal Nehru University, New Delhi to occupy the position of its prestigious Greek Chair Professor. After his retirement he was reappointed Visiting Professor of Greek Studies in JNU in which capacity he still continues.

Arora is an author of four books and edited 13. Among his important publications include Motifs in Indian Mythology, Their Greek and other Parallels (1981), Graeco-Indica (1991), Greeks on India (1996), Yunan Itihas aur Samskriti (in Hindi 2010), and Alexander and India (in press). He has contributed nearly 120 articles in various journals. He is founder General Secretary of Indian Society for Greek and Roman Studies and edits its annual journal Yavanika. He was General President UP History Congress (1996–97) and Sectional President (Ancient India) Indian History Congress (2002). As a visiting fellow, he has visited U.S., Canada, and several countries in Europe, Asia and Africa. His contribution earned him the most prestigious Greek civilian honor Golden Cross-Order of Honor from the President of Greece (1996). In his honor was published the Felicitation Volume Udayana-New Horizons in History Classics, and Intercultural Studies (2006).

== Sources ==
- Greek Sources on India: Alexander to Megasthenes
