= Lajwanti Chabra =

Indian craftsperson

- Born: Punjab, India
- Citizenship: Indian
- Awards: Padma Shri award

Lajwanti Chhabra is an Indian craftsperson known for her contributions in preserving Phulkari, a traditional embroidery art from Punjab. She has played a crucial role in the revival of Phulkari textile form. She brought attention to the cultural of Phulkari form and rural women artisans were empowered by her work, which helped them gain recognition and livelihoods. In 2021, she was awarded the Padma Shri award by the Government of India for her contributions to Indian handicrafts.

== Early life ==
She was born in Punjab, where she was introduced to embroidery from a young age. Her community's women taught her Phulkari techniques while she was surrounded by local traditions and storytelling through threadwork.

== Award ==
Padma Shri award for her contributions to Indian handicrafts.
