= Kush Arora =

American record producer

Kush Arora, who has produced under the name Only Now since 2013, is a music producer and DJ from San Francisco. Arora blends use of the tumbi and the algoze flute from his Punjabi heritage with industrial, metal, punk, goth, bhangra, and more before shifting to experimental, dub, and dancehall inspired creations in the late 1990s.

In 2012, he started a radio show called Surya Dub Radio on Berkeley's KPFA 94.1FM Radio—California's largest independent station with Maneesh The Twister.
