= Vishal Arora =

Indian journalist

Vishal Arora is a journalist, writer, photojournalist, and videographer based in New Delhi, India.

He is the publisher and editor of Newsreel Asia, an OTT news media. He was previously the editor of StoriesAsia, a collective of journalists from South and Southeast Asia. He resigned from StoriesAsia in January 2021. He used to be the Features Editor of The Caravan, a fortnightly journal of politics and culture published from Delhi, and an editor at Indo-Asian News Service. Arora writes on politics, religion, culture, human rights and foreign affairs in south and south east Asia for national and foreign media. Arora particularly coves Bhutan, Nepal, Burma, Indonesia, Sri Lanka and the Maldives.

Arora teaches journalism and storytelling, as a guest faculty, at Indian Institute of Mass Communication. Arora is on the advisory board of the John McCandlish Phillips Journalism Institute in New York.

Arora has reported on hundreds of incidents of communal violence in India, mainly against the Christian minority. Arora was invited as a witness at a briefing titled, "the Threat Religious Extremism Poses to Democracy and Security in India: Focus on Orissa", organised by the United States Congressional Task Force on International Religious Freedom on 10 December 2008 in Washington DC. Arora has also presented papers on the mixing of religion and politics in seminars organised by the Oxford Centre for Religion and Public Life in Washington DC. Arora was also invited by the Foreign & Commonwealth Office in the U.K. for a conference on ‘Religion, Media and the Commonwealth’ in March 2020 to speak about the 2020 communal violence in Delhi. Arora has also taught journalism in Uganda.

Arora, along with his colleague Harshita Rathore, was finalist in the 2021 EPPY Awards for The Dinner Table docuseries published by ReligionUnplugged and Newsreel Asia, in two categories: Best Collaborative Investigative, and Best Feature Video.
