= Jyoti Arora =

Indian tech blogger-turned-writer

- Born: 1977 (age 48–49)
- Occupations: Novelist; blogger
- Writing career
- Genres: Fiction; motivational
- Notable works: You Came Like Hope (2017); Lemon Girl (2014)
- Website: jyotiarora.com

Jyoti Arora is an Indian author of several books, including Dream's Sake (2011), Lemon Girl (2014) and You Came Like Hope (2017). She is also a tech blogger.

== Biography ==
Arora was diagnosed with thalassemia at three months old and left school due to her health in the seventh grade. She continued her education through correspondence schooling. She has completed a B.A. in English (Hons.) from Delhi University, and master's degrees in English Literature and Applied Psychology from Annamalai University. She has worked as an English tutor and freelance writer, and for an IT recruitment firm based in the United States.

She lives in Ghaziabad.

== Works ==
- Dream's Sake (2011), V&S Publishers
- Lemon Girl (2014), self-published
- You Came Like Hope (2017), self-published
- #JustRomance: A collection of 7 short romances.
