= Amrik Singh Arora =

Bengali singer (1943–2011)

- Amrik Singh
- Born: 1943; Kolutola Street, Kolkata, British India
- Died: 3 June 2011 (aged 67–68)
- Education: Visudhananda Saraswati
- Occupations: Playback singer; musician
- Musical career
- Genres: Filmi; Bhajans; Ghazals

Amrik Singh Arora (1943 – 3 June 2011) was an Indian singer who was one of the promoters of the new modern style of Shyama Sangeet. He had a natural voice. Although a member of the Sikh community, he created the first example of non-Bengali man to practice Shyama Sangeet. He became the first vocalist to songs, ghazals, Punjabi Bhangara film songs and Bhojpuri songs to input in Kolkata. He has given voice to more than two thousand modern, folk and spiritual Bengali songs. However, most of his songs were devotional.

== Early music career ==
His father Balbir Singh Arora had a business of writing ink. Not joining the family business, he turned towards the world of music with the inspiration of his mother Yashwant Kaur from his childhood. He sung together with his mother. Initially learned classical music from Mr. Chandramani. After that, he continued to take training from Shri Subodh Chatterjee. He started his musical career from 1961 at Gurudwara Bara Sikh Sangh in Kolkata. At the age of 7, there he performed on stage show for the first time. Most of the times he used to serve along with his mother. He studied at Visuddhananda Saraswati Vidyalaya, a Hindi medium school adjacent to Mahajati Sadan in North Kolkata. He regularly performed music in school functions and won numerous awards. Bengali language subject was compulsory for two years in his higher secondary. This is how his fascination with Bengali script and language was created. During the period from 1960 to 1963, he also sang in the morning show of the movie hall 'Shri' along with various artists every Sunday at the initiative of the clubs.

== Career rise ==
During 1966–67, he was invited to perform Indian music every evening at the Blue Fox restaurant. He had sung permanently there till 1977 for a monthly salary of 200 taka. Also, he sang at the Durga Puja cultural program at College Square in 1971 at the invitation of famous actor Jahor Roy. There, he won the hearts of the audience. In 1974, he released his first record with lyrics by Gauriprasanna Mazumder and composed by Himangshu Biswas.

On the advice of a well-wisher, he met famous singer Hemant Mukhopadhyay in 1976. After initially singing to impressed Hemant's Hindi songs, but Hemant Mukhopadhyay discouraged him from taking to interest in Bengali songs. However, at the request of Hemanta's wife Bela Mukhopadhyay, he was later included in Bengali songs. He started the journey by singing his tuneful Bengali songs. In 1977, the song 'Rupasi Dohai Tomar', lyrics by Pulak Banerjee and composed by Hemant Mukhopadhyay, was released by Hindustan Records. At this stage, he left the job from Blue Fox restaurant.

His life struggle started from 1979. His mother died in 1984. Involved in family problems. Later, his father died in 1985 and elder sister died in 1987. Between 1983 and 1984, he found great success again with singing. Started singing music of Shyama Sangeet from 1985. Several cassettes including Shyama Sangeet are released from His Master's Voice. Also, involve himself in devotional songs. He had done many programs in association with various organizations in Kolkata. Besides, he participated various programs which organized in Bombay, Delhi, United States of America and other European countries.

In 1997, he participated as a playback singer in the film 'Hingsa' by lyricist Pulak Banerjee and composer Mrinal Banerjee. In 1998, His Master's Voice released two cassettes of Palligiti and Shyama Sangeet. Besides, he performed songs in Doordarshan.

== Personal life ==
Personally he was married. He married at a young age. At the end of his life, he was plunged into extremely financial crisis. He lived in Baguihati in 2000s. At one point he got cancer. He died on 3 June 2011, at the age of 68.
