= Meenakshi Arora =

Senior advocate in the Supreme Court of India

- Occupation: Senior Advocate at the Supreme Court of India

Meenakshi Arora is a lawyer designated as senior counsel practising at Supreme Court of India.

== Education ==
Arora graduated in law from M. S. University of Baroda.

== Career ==
In 1984, Arora got enrolled at bar and since 1986 has been practising law at Supreme Court of India. In 1989, she qualified and became an Advocate-on-Record at the Supreme Court. She had also, for a brief period, worked with Goodwin and Soble, an international law firm based in Washington DC. She was also a partner at an Indian law firm Hemant Sahai and Associates. In 2010, her name was recommended by a judges' collegium for elevation as a judge of the Delhi High Court however she later withdrew her consent from the judgeship. She was also the standing counsel for the Election Commission of India. In September 2013, full bench of Supreme Court headed by then Chief Justice of India P. Sathasivam designated her as a senior counsel/senior advocate being only the fifth woman to be designated so. She was one of the members of the drafting committee which drafted the regulations The Gender Sensitisation & Sexual Harassment of Women at the Supreme Court of India (Prevention, Prohibition and Redressal), Regulations, 2013 to protect and provide grievance redressal to women lawyers from sexual harassment at the Supreme Court. In the case of Nitisha vs Union of India, Arora was the counsel for one of the petitioners.
