= Anil Kaushik =

Indian politician

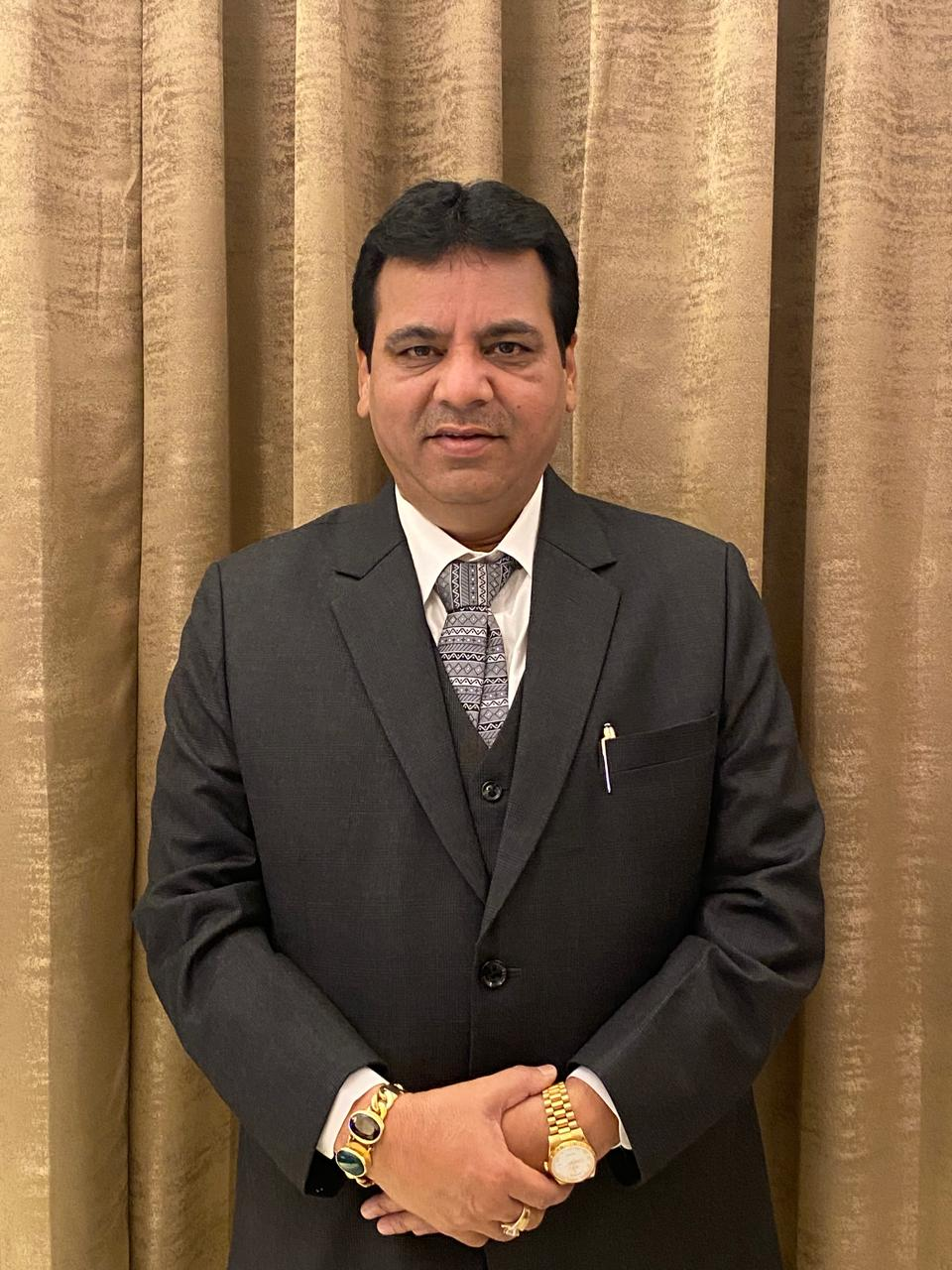

Vice President BJP Maharashtra
- In office November 2024

Personal details
- Born: India
- Party: BJP
- Spouse: Sudarshana Kaushik

Anil Kaushik is an Bharatiya Janta Party Politician from Navi Mumbai, Maharashtra, India. He is an ex-deputy mayor of Navi Mumbai Municipal Corporation. He has been appointed as the Navi Mumbai Congress President in 2018.

In 2024 appointed as Vice President BJP Maharashtra.

== Positions held ==
- 2024: Vice President Bhartiya Janta Party Maharashtra
- 2018: Elected as President of Navi Mumbai District Congress Committee
- 2000: Elected Deputy Mayor of Navi Mumbai Municipal Corporation
- 2002: President Navi Mumbai District Congress Committee*
- 2000: Elected Corporator Navi Mumbai Municipal Corporation*
- 1998: Leader Of Opposition Navi Mumbai Municipal Corporation*
- 1997:President Vashi Block Congress*
- 1995: Elected Corporator Navi Mumbai Municipal Corporation*
- 1992: Vice President Thane Block Congress*
- 1990: Vice President Vashi Block Youth Congress*
- 1985: Executive Member Thane Taluka Congress*
