= Suresh Arora =

Indian police officer

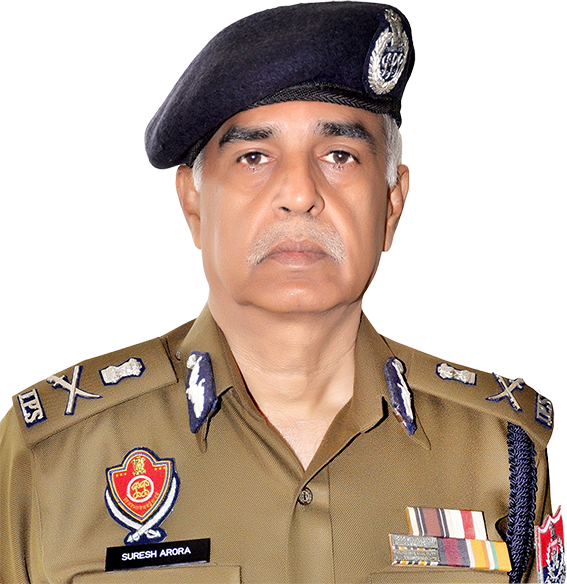

Director general of police, Punjab

Suresh Arora is the Chief Information Commissioner of Punjab. He is a 1982 cadre IPS officer and was the Chief of the Punjab Police. He was appointed as DGP of Punjab Police in April 2014, before the general elections in India. He retired in February 2019. He is also a member of Institute of Company Secretaries of India (ICSI), a Statutory body under Act of Parliament and under the jurisdiction of Ministry of Corporate Affairs. Presently serving as Chief Information Commissioner of Punjab.

Arora completed his LLM at School of Oriental and African Studies, University of London. He was the SSP of Patiala, Jalandhar, Amritsar, Hoshiarpur and Chandigarh over the course of 33 years of service.

Suresh Arora's daughter Megha Arora is an officer of the Indian Foreign Service. She is married to Utkarsh Duggal who is also an Indian diplomat.
