= List of cities and towns in Gurdaspur district =

Location of Punjab in India

Gurdaspur district is a district in the state of Punjab, situated in the northwest part of the Republic of India. Gurdaspur is the district headquarters. It internationally borders Narowal district of the Pakistani Punjab, Kathua district of Jammu and Kashmir, the Punjab districts of Amritsar and Hoshiarpur, and Chamba and Kangra districts of Himachal Pradesh. Two main rivers, the Beas and the Ravi, pass through the district. The Mughal emperor Akbar is said to have been enthroned in a garden near Kalanaur, a historically important town in the district. The district is in the foothills of the Himalayas.

== Cities and Towns ==
- Achal
- Batala
- Bhaini mian khan
- Bharath
- Bharoli Kalan
- Borewala Afghana
- Buche Nangal
- Budha The
- Chhina
- Dadwan
- Dera Baba Nanak
- Dhariwal
- Dina Nagar
- Dorangla
- Dula Nangal
- Fatehgarh Churian
- Ghuman
- Ghuman Khurd
- Gosal Afghana
- Gosal Zimidaran
- Gurdaspur
- Janial
- Jogowal Jattan
- Kahnuwan
- Kala Afghana
- Kalanaur
- Kaler Kalan
- Kathiali
- Khaira
- Ladha Munda
- Mann Sandwal
- Mastkot
- Mian Kot
- Naserke
- Parowal
- Qadian
- Rangar Nangal
- Ranjit Bagh
- Rattangarh
- Sri Hargobindpur
- Talwandi Virk
- Tibber
- Umarpura
