= Bharathwal =

- Village
- Interactive map of Bharathwal
- Coordinates: 31°49′10.76″N 75°04′07.75″E
- Country: India
- State: Punjab
- District: Gurdaspur
- Tehsil: Batala
- Region: Majha

Government
  - Type: Panchayat raj
  - Body: Gram panchayat

Languages
  - Official: Punjabi
- Time zone: UTC+5:30 (IST)
- Telephone: 01871
- ISO 3166 code: IN-PB
- Vehicle registration: PB-18
- Website: gurdaspur.nic.in

Bharathwal is a village in Batala in Gurdaspur district of Punjab, India. The village is administrated by a Sarpanch, an elected representative of the village.

== Demographics ==
According to the 2011 Census of India, Bharathwal has a population of approximately 948 people living in 188 families. Of these, 486 are male and 462 are female, giving an average sex ratio of 951 females per 1000 males. The village has 117 children aged 0–6 years, representing about 12% of the total population. The literacy rate in Bharathwal is around 63.2%, with male literacy higher than female literacy.

== Geography ==
Bharathwal covers an area of about 187 hectares and is located 23 km from the sub‑district headquarters at Batala and about 48 km from the district headquarters in Gurdaspur.

The village is situated near several neighbouring villages, including Sundal, Janglan, Naserke, Riali Kalan, Kaluwal, Sarchur, Bishniwal, Talwandi Bharth, Riali Khurd and Nanak Chack.

== Infrastructure ==
Bharathwal has access to public and private bus services. The nearest railway station is located more than 10 km away.

== See also ==
- List of villages in India
