= Shankerpura =

Shankarpura
- City
- Location of Shankarpura Village in Punjab, India Shankarpura (India)
- Coordinates: 31.8116°N 75.1374°E
- Country: India
- State: Punjab
- Region: North India
- District: Gurdaspur

Government
  - Type: Gram Panchayat

Area
  - Land: 1.6 km^{2} (0.62 sq mi)

Population (2011)
  - Total: 910

Shankarpura is a village located in Batala Tehsil of Gurdaspur district in Punjab, India.

== Geography ==
Shankarpura is situated 4 km away from the sub-district headquarters Batala and 39 km away from district headquarters in Gurdaspur. It has a total population of 910 and an area of about 160 hectares. As per 2011 Population Census, Shankarpura is self-governed by a gram panchayat.

== Facilities ==
The village contains a post office, a dispensary, an elementary school, a senior secondary school, and around 161 houses.

== Demographics ==
Male Population	Female Population	Total Population
507	403	910

== Transport ==
Type	Status
Public Bus Service Available	Available within <5 km distance
Private Bus Service	Available within 10+ km distance
Railway Station	Available within 10+ km distance
Others	Available within village

== Nearby villages ==
1. Bishniwal
2. Talwandi Bharath
3. Aliwal Araian
4. Bullowal
5. Khokhar
6. Dhadialanatt
7. Ghoga
8. Kotla Baman
9. Marar
10. Raliali Khurd
11. Rali Ali Kalan
