= Bhaini Mian Khan =

Coordinates: 31°53′N 75°31′E

Bhaini Mian Khan (Village ID 28409) is a small town in block Kahnuwan, District Gurdaspur. It is one of the oldest villages (of that time) in this area. It is being said that Bhaini Mian Khan got its name from one of the very famous man Mian Khan. People use to call it Mian Khan's Bhaini. It is also believed that it was a Muslim village before separation of India & Pakistan. According to the 2011 census it has a population of 2907 living in 545 households. Its main agriculture product is wheat growing.

== Location ==
It is on 9 km distance from its block Kahnuwan. It is 24 km far from its District and Main City Gurdaspur, and 175 km from its State Capital Chandigarh. Other villages near Bhaini mian khan are Kotli Harchandan (3 km), Salohpur (4.1 km), on the way to Kahnuwan. Jhanda (1 km), Chak Sharif (4 km), Purana Shalla (12 km) on the way to Gurdaspur. Bagrian (2.6 km), Mullanwal (7.7 km), Mojpur (7.9 km) toward the river Beas. Nanowal (1 km), toward Quadian.

It is a main and fast developing town in the area. Bhaini Mian Khan's Post Code is 143517, Area code is 01872 and main telephone exchange is Qadian.

== Facilities ==
Facilities available in the town are:

1. Government School,
2. Government Hospital,
3. Power House,
4. Police Station,
5. Focal Point (Dana Mandi)
6. Petrol Pump (2)

It also had a range of Private Schools adding to its name as Education hub & Marriage Resort. It is also famous for conducting sports tournament every year. Kabaddi is the main sport in this tournament. Teams from far and near come to participate in this tournament.

== Religious ==
1. Gurudwara (3)
1. Mandir (2)
2. Church (Seventh Day Adventist) (1)
3. Satsang Beas (1)
