= Khawaja Bains =

- Village
- Country: India
- State: Punjab
- District: Gurdaspur
- Tehsil: Batala
- Region: Majha

Government
  - Type: Panchayat raj
  - Body: Gram panchayat

Area
  - Total: 315 ha (780 acres)

Population (2011)
  - Total: 251; 155/96 ♂/♀
  - Scheduled Castes: 21; 13/8 ♂/♀
  - Total Households: 45

Languages
  - Official: Punjabi
- Time zone: UTC+5:30 (IST)
- Telephone: 01871
- ISO 3166 code: IN-PB
- Vehicle registration: PB-18
- Website: gurdaspur.nic.in

Khawaja Bains is a village in Batala in Gurdaspur district of Punjab State, India. It is located 35 kilometres (22 mi) from the sub-district headquarters, 32 kilometres (20 mi) from the district headquarters and 14 kilometres (8.7 mi) from Sri Hargobindpur. The village is administrated by Sarpanch, an elected representative of the village.

== Demography ==
In 2011, the village had 45 houses and a population of 251 (155 males and 96 females). According to the report published by Census India in 2011, the population included 21 from Scheduled Caste and the village had no Schedule Tribe.

== See also ==
- List of villages in India
