= Loh Chap =

- Village
- Country: India
- State: Punjab
- District: Gurdaspur
- Tehsil: Batala
- Region: Majha

Government
  - Type: Panchayat raj
  - Body: Gram panchayat

Area
  - Total: 186 ha (460 acres)

Population (2011)
  - Total: 858; 465/393 ♂/♀
  - Scheduled Castes: 266; 150/116 ♂/♀
  - Total Households: 181

Languages
  - Official: Punjabi
- Time zone: UTC+5:30 (IST)
- Telephone: 01871
- ISO 3166 code: IN-PB
- Vehicle registration: PB-18
- Website: gurdaspur.nic.in

Loh Chap is a village in Batala in Gurdaspur district of Punjab State, India. It is located 10 kilometres (6.2 mi) from sub district headquarter, 40 kilometres (25 mi) from district headquarter and 8 kilometres (5.0 mi) from Sri Hargobindpur. The village is administrated by Sarpanch an elected representative of the village.

== Demography ==
As of 2011, the village has a total number of 181 houses and a population of 858 of which 465 are males while 393 are females. According to the report published by Census India in 2011, out of the total population of the village 266 people are from Schedule Caste and the village does not have any Schedule Tribe population so far.

== See also ==
- List of villages in India
