= Sangatpur, Gurdaspur =

Sangatpur
- Village
- Location in Punjab Sangatpur (India)
- Coordinates: 29.9583°N 75.7554°E
- Country: India
- State: Punjab
- District: Gurdaspur
- Tehsil: Batala
- Region: Majha

Government
  - Type: Panchayat raj
  - Body: Gram panchayat

Area
  - Total: 110 ha (270 acres)

Population (2011)
  - Total: 872; 464/408 ♂/♀
  - Scheduled Castes: 5; 4/1 ♂/♀
  - Total Households: 174

Languages
  - Official: Punjabi
- Time zone: UTC+5:30 (IST)
- Telephone: 01871
- ISO 3166 code: IN-PB
- Vehicle registration: PB-18
- Website: gurdaspur.nic.in

Sangatpur is a village in Batala in Gurdaspur district of Punjab State, India. It is located 4 kilometres (2.5 mi) from the sub district headquarters, 34 kilometres (21 mi) from the district headquarters, and 2 kilometres (1.2 mi) from Sri Hargobindpur. The village is administrated by Sarpanch, an elected representative of the village.

== Demography ==
As of 2011, the village has a total of 174 houses and a population of 872, of which 464 are males and 408 are females. According to the report published by Census India in 2011, out of the total population of the village, 5 people are from Schedule Caste, and the village does not have any Schedule Tribe population so far.

== See also ==
- List of villages in India
- Haqiqat Singh Kanhaiya
