= Mir Kachana =

Coordinates: 31°56′N 75°10′E

- Village
- Interactive map of Mir Kachana
- Country: India
- State: Punjab
- District: Gurdaspur
- Tehsil: Batala
- Region: Majha

Government
  - Type: Panchayat raj
  - Body: Gram panchayat

Area
  - Total: 84 ha (210 acres)

Population (2011)
  - Total: 298; 157/141 ♂/♀
  - Scheduled Castes: 6; 4/2 ♂/♀
  - Total Households: 50

Languages
  - Official: Punjabi
- Time zone: UTC+5:30 (IST)
- Telephone: 01871
- ISO 3166 code: IN-PB
- Vehicle registration: PB-18
- Website: gurdaspur.nic.in

Mir Kachana is a village in Batala in Gurdaspur district of Punjab State, India. It is located 13 kilometres (8.1 mi) from sub district headquarter, 36 kilometres (22 mi) from district headquarter and 13 kilometres (8.1 mi) from Sri Hargobindpur. The village is administrated by Sarpanch an elected representative of the village.

== Demography ==
As of 2011, the village has a total number of 50 houses and a population of 298 of which 157 are males while 141 are females. According to the report published by Census India in 2011, out of the total population of the village 6 people are from Schedule Caste and the village does not have any Schedule Tribe population so far.

== See also ==
- List of villages in India
