= Fatehgarh Churian R =

- Village
- Country: India
- State: Punjab
- District: Gurdaspur
- Tehsil: Batala
- Region: Majha

Government
  - Type: Panchayat raj
  - Body: Gram panchayat

Area
  - Total: 752 ha (1,860 acres)

Population (2011)
  - Total: 4,387; 2,308/2,079 ♂/♀
  - Scheduled Castes: 1,023; 540/483 ♂/♀
  - Total Households: 822

Languages
  - Official: Punjabi
- Time zone: UTC+5:30 (IST)
- Telephone: 01871
- ISO 3166 code: IN-PB
- Vehicle registration: PB-18
- Website: gurdaspur.nic.in

Fatehgarh Churian R is a village in Batala in Gurdaspur district of Punjab State, India. It is located 25 kilometres (16 mi) from sub district headquarter, 35 kilometres (22 mi) from district headquarter and 14 kilometres (8.7 mi) from Sri Hargobindpur. The village is administrated by Sarpanch an elected representative of the village.

== Demography ==
As of 2011, the village has a total number of 822 houses and a population of 4387 of which 2308 are males while 2079 are females. According to the report published by Census India in 2011, out of the total population of the village 1023 people are from Schedule Caste and the village does not have any Schedule Tribe population so far.

== See also ==
- List of villages in India
