= Suniyah =

- Village
- Country: India
- State: Punjab
- District: Gurdaspur
- Tehsil: Batala
- Region: Majha

Government
  - Type: Panchayat raj
  - Body: Gram panchayat

Area
  - Total: 163 ha (400 acres)

Population (2011)
  - Total: 2,246; 1,137/1,109 ♂/♀
  - Scheduled Castes: 108; 61/47 ♂/♀
  - Total Households: 436

Languages
  - Official: Punjabi
- Time zone: UTC+5:30 (IST)
- Telephone: 01871
- ISO 3166 code: IN-PB
- Vehicle registration: PB-18
- Website: gurdaspur.nic.in

Suniyah is a village in Batala in Gurdaspur district of Punjab State, India. It is located 4 kilometres (2.5 mi) from sub district headquarter, 39 kilometres (24 mi) from district headquarter and 3 kilometres (1.9 mi) from Sri Hargobindpur. The village is administrated by Sarpanch an elected representative of the village.

== Demography ==
As of 2011, the village has a total number of 436 houses and a population of 2246 of which 1137 are males while 1109 are females. According to the report published by Census India in 2011, out of the total population of the village 108 people are from Schedule Caste and the village does not have any Schedule Tribe population so far.

== See also ==
- List of villages in India
