= Kane Gil =

- Village
- Country: India
- State: Punjab
- District: Gurdaspur
- Tehsil: Batala
- Region: Majha

Government
  - Type: Panchayat raj
  - Body: Gram panchayat

Area
  - Total: 63 ha (160 acres)

Population (2011)
  - Total: 179; 97/82 ♂/♀
  - Scheduled Castes: 9; 5/4 ♂/♀
  - Total Households: 35

Languages
  - Official: Punjabi
- Time zone: UTC+5:30 (IST)
- Telephone: 01871
- ISO 3166 code: IN-PB
- Vehicle registration: PB-18
- Website: gurdaspur.nic.in

Kane Gil is a village in Batala in Gurdaspur district of Punjab State, India. It is located 15 kilometres (9.3 mi) from sub district headquarter, 45 kilometres (28 mi) from district headquarter and 8 kilometres (5.0 mi) from Sri Hargobindpur. The village is administrated by Sarpanch an elected representative of the village.

== Demography ==
As of 2011, the village has a total number of 35 houses and a population of 179 of which 97 are males while 82 are females. According to the report published by Census India in 2011, out of the total population of the village 9 people are from Schedule Caste and the village does not have any Schedule Tribe population so far.

== See also ==
- List of villages in India
