= Ghas =

- Village
- Country: India
- State: Punjab
- District: Gurdaspur
- Tehsil: Batala
- Region: Majha

Government
  - Type: Panchayat raj
  - Body: Gram panchayat

Area
  - Total: 168 ha (420 acres)

Population (2011)
  - Total: 932; 498/434 ♂/♀
  - Scheduled Castes: 227; 122/105 ♂/♀
  - Total Households: 167

Languages
  - Official: Punjabi
- Time zone: UTC+5:30 (IST)
- Telephone: 01871
- ISO 3166 code: IN-PB
- Vehicle registration: PB-18
- Website: gurdaspur.nic.in

Ghas is a village in Batala in Gurdaspur district of Punjab State, India. It is located 15 kilometres (9.3 mi) from sub district headquarter, 43 kilometres (27 mi) from district headquarter and 15 kilometres (9.3 mi) from Sri Hargobindpur. The village is administrated by Sarpanch an elected representative of the village.

== Demography ==
As of 2011, the village has a total number of 167 houses and a population of 932 of which 498 are males while 434 are females. According to the report published by Census India in 2011, out of the total population of the village 227 people are from Schedule Caste and the village does not have any Schedule Tribe population so far.

== See also ==
- List of villages in India
