= Warsal Chak =

- Village
- Country: India
- State: Punjab
- District: Gurdaspur
- Tehsil: Batala
- Region: Majha

Government
  - Type: Panchayat raj
  - Body: Gram panchayat

Area
  - Total: 78 ha (190 acres)

Population (2011)
  - Total: 690; 347/343 ♂/♀
  - Scheduled Castes: 360; 185/175 ♂/♀
  - Total Households: 136

Languages
  - Official: Punjabi
- Time zone: UTC+5:30 (IST)
- Telephone: 01871
- ISO 3166 code: IN-PB
- Vehicle registration: PB-18
- Website: gurdaspur.nic.in

Warsal Chak is a village in Batala in Gurdaspur district of Punjab State, India. It is located 28 kilometres (17 mi) from sub district headquarter, 33 kilometres (21 mi) from district headquarter and 5 kilometres (3.1 mi) from Sri Hargobindpur. The village is administrated by Sarpanch an elected representative of the village.

== Demography ==
As of 2011, the village has a total number of 136 houses and a population of 690 of which 347 are males while 343 are females. According to the report published by Census India in 2011, out of the total population of the village 360 people are from Schedule Caste and the village does not have any Schedule Tribe population so far.

== See also ==
- List of villages in India
