= Jaitu Sarja =

- Village
- Country: India
- State: Punjab
- District: Gurdaspur
- Tehsil: Batala
- Region: Majha

Government
  - Type: Panchayat raj
  - Body: Gram panchayat

Area
  - Total: 477 ha (1,180 acres)

Population (2011)
  - Total: 3,184; 1,642/1,542 ♂/♀
  - Scheduled Castes: 1,610; 844/766 ♂/♀
  - Total Households: 605

Languages
  - Official: Punjabi
- Time zone: UTC+5:30 (IST)
- Telephone: 01871
- ISO 3166 code: IN-PB
- Vehicle registration: PB-18
- Website: gurdaspur.nic.in

Jaitu Sarja is a village in Batala in Gurdaspur district of Punjab State, India. It is located 11 kilometres (6.8 mi) from sub district headquarter, 46 kilometres (29 mi) from district headquarter and 12 kilometres (7.5 mi) from Sri Hargobindpur. The village is administrated by Sarpanch an elected representative of the village.

== Demography ==
As of 2011, the village has a total number of 605 houses and a population of 3184 of which 1642 are males while 1542 are females. According to the report published by Census India in 2011, out of the total population of the village 1610 people are from Schedule Caste and the village does not have any Schedule Tribe population so far.

== See also ==
- List of villages in India
