= Umarwala =

Coordinates: 31°55′N 75°07′E

- Village
- Interactive map of Umarwala
- Country: India
- State: Punjab
- District: Gurdaspur
- Tehsil: Batala
- Region: Majha

Government
  - Type: Panchayat raj
  - Body: Gram panchayat

Area
  - Total: 152 ha (380 acres)

Population (2011)
  - Total: 839; 447/392 ♂/♀
  - Scheduled Castes: 0; 0/0 ♂/♀
  - Total Households: 173

Languages
  - Official: Punjabi
- Time zone: UTC+5:30 (IST)
- Telephone: 01871
- ISO 3166 code: IN-PB
- Vehicle registration: PB-18
- Website: gurdaspur.nic.in

Umarwala is a village in Batala in Gurdaspur district of Punjab State, India. It is located 17 kilometres (11 mi) from sub district headquarter, 49 kilometres (30 mi) from district headquarter and 17 kilometres (11 mi) from Sri Hargobindpur. The village is administrated by Sarpanch an elected representative of the village.

== Demography ==
As of 2011, the village has a total number of 173 houses and a population of 839 of which 447 are males while 392 are females. According to the report published by Census India in 2011, out of the total population of the village 0 people are from Schedule Caste and the village does not have any Schedule Tribe population so far.

== See also ==
- List of villages in India
