= Kala Nangal =

Coordinates: 32°04′N 75°22′E

- Village
- Interactive map of Kala Nangal
- Country: India
- State: Punjab
- District: Gurdaspur
- Tehsil: Batala
- Region: Majha

Government
  - Type: Panchayat raj
  - Body: Gram panchayat

Area
  - Total: 166 ha (410 acres)

Population (2011)
  - Total: 1,537; 811/726 ♂/♀
  - Scheduled Castes: 813; 426/387 ♂/♀
  - Total Households: 262

Languages
  - Official: Punjabi
- Time zone: UTC+5:30 (IST)
- Telephone: 01871
- ISO 3166 code: IN-PB
- Vehicle registration: PB-18
- Website: gurdaspur.nic.in

Kala Nangal is a village in Batala in Gurdaspur district of Punjab State, India. It is located 3 kilometres (1.9 mi) from sub district headquarter, 38 kilometres (24 mi) from district headquarter and 3 kilometres (1.9 mi) from Sri Hargobindpur. The village is administrated by a Sarpanch, an elected representative of the village.

== Demography ==
As of 2011, the village has a total number of 262 houses and a population of 1537 of which 811 are males while 726 are females. According to the report published by Census India in 2011, out of the total population of the village 813 people are from Schedule Caste and the village does not have any Schedule Tribe population so far.

== See also ==
- List of villages in India
