= Kot Ahmad Khan =

- Village
- Country: India
- State: Punjab
- District: Gurdaspur
- Tehsil: Batala
- Region: Majha

Government
  - Type: Panchayat raj
  - Body: Gram panchayat

Area
  - Total: 94 ha (230 acres)

Population (2011)
  - Total: 211; 118/93 ♂/♀
  - Scheduled Castes: 87; 61/26 ♂/♀
  - Total Households: 42

Languages
  - Official: Punjabi
- Time zone: UTC+5:30 (IST)
- Telephone: 01871
- ISO 3166 code: IN-PB
- Vehicle registration: PB-18
- Website: gurdaspur.nic.in

Kot Ahmad Khan is a village in Batala in Gurdaspur district of Punjab State, India. It is located 10 kilometres (6.2 mi) from sub district headquarter, 40 kilometres (25 mi) from district headquarter and 8 kilometres (5.0 mi) from Sri Hargobindpur. The village is administrated by Sarpanch an elected representative of the village.

== Demography ==
As of 2011, the village has a total number of 42 houses and a population of 211 of which 118 are males while 93 are females. According to the report published by Census India in 2011, out of the total population of the village 87 people are from Schedule Caste and the village does not have any Schedule Tribe population so far.

== See also ==
- List of villages in India
