= Kotla Suba Singh =

Coordinates: 31°41′N 75°18′E

- Village
- Interactive map of Kotla Suba Singh
- Country: India
- State: Punjab
- District: Gurdaspur
- Tehsil: Batala
- Region: Majha

Government
  - Type: Panchayat raj
  - Body: Gram panchayat

Area
  - Total: 170 ha (420 acres)

Population (2011)
  - Total: 862; 440/422 ♂/♀
  - Scheduled Castes: 166; 84/82 ♂/♀
  - Total Households: 163

Languages
  - Official: Punjabi
- Time zone: UTC+5:30 (IST)
- Telephone: 01871
- ISO 3166 code: IN-PB
- Vehicle registration: PB-18
- Website: gurdaspur.nic.in

Kotla Suba Singh is a village in Batala in Gurdaspur district of Punjab State, India. It is located 20 kilometres (12 mi) from sub district headquarter, 50 kilometres (31 mi) from district headquarter and 18 kilometres (11 mi) from Sri Hargobindpur. The village is administrated by Sarpanch an elected representative of the village.

== Demography ==
As of 2011, the village has a total number of 163 houses and a population of 862 of which 440 are males while 422 are females. According to the report published by Census India in 2011, out of the total population of the village 166 people are from Schedule Caste and the village does not have any Schedule Tribe population so far.

== See also ==
- List of villages in India
