= Jhanjian Kalan =

- Village
- Country: India
- State: Punjab
- District: Gurdaspur
- Tehsil: Batala
- Region: Majha

Government
  - Type: Panchayat raj
  - Body: Gram panchayat

Area
  - Total: 138 ha (340 acres)

Population (2011)
  - Total: 612; 327/285 ♂/♀
  - Scheduled Castes: 89; 40/49 ♂/♀
  - Total Households: 108

Languages
  - Official: Punjabi
- Time zone: UTC+5:30 (IST)
- Telephone: 01871
- ISO 3166 code: IN-PB
- Vehicle registration: PB-18
- Website: gurdaspur.nic.in

Jhanjian Kalan is a village in Batala in Gurdaspur district of Punjab State, India. It is located 31 kilometres (19 mi) from sub district headquarter, 40 kilometres (25 mi) from district headquarter and 8 kilometres (5.0 mi) from Sri Hargobindpur. The village is administrated by Sarpanch an elected representative of the village.

== Demography ==
As of 2011, the village has a total number of 108 houses and a population of 612 of which 327 are males while 285 are females. According to the report published by Census India in 2011, out of the total population of the village 89 people are from Schedule Caste and the village does not have any Schedule Tribe population so far.

== See also ==
- List of villages in India
