= Ladha Munda =

- Village
- Country: India
- State: Punjab
- District: Gurdaspur
- Tehsil: Batala
- Region: Majha

Government
  - Type: Panchayat raj
  - Body: Gram panchayat

Area
  - Total: 864 ha (2,130 acres)

Population (2011)
  - Total: 3,258; 1,710/1,548 ♂/♀
  - Scheduled Castes: 1,177; 595/582 ♂/♀
  - Total Households: 620

Languages
  - Official: Punjabi
- Time zone: UTC+5:30 (IST)
- Telephone: 01871
- ISO 3166 code: IN-PB
- Vehicle registration: PB-18
- Website: gurdaspur.nic.in

Ladha Munda is a village in Batala in Gurdaspur district of Punjab State, India. It is located 25 kilometres (16 mi) from sub district headquarter, 55 kilometres (34 mi) from district headquarter and 13 kilometres (8.1 mi) from Sri Hargobindpur. The village is administrated by Sarpanch an elected representative of the village.

== Demography ==
As of 2011, the village has a total of 620 houses and a population of 3258 of which 1710 are males while 1548 are females. According to the report published by Census India in 2011, out of the total population, 1177 people are from Schedule Caste and the village does not have any Schedule Tribe population so far.

== See also ==
- List of villages in India
