= Hassanpur Kalan =

- Village
- Country: India
- State: Punjab
- District: Gurdaspur
- Tehsil: Batala
- Region: Majha

Government
  - Type: Panchayat raj
  - Body: Gram panchayat

Area
  - Total: 226 ha (560 acres)

Population (2011)
  - Total: 1,337; 684/653 ♂/♀
  - Scheduled Castes: 182; 92/90 ♂/♀
  - Total Households: 222

Languages
  - Official: Punjabi
- Time zone: UTC+5:30 (IST)
- Telephone: 01871
- ISO 3166 code: IN-PB
- Vehicle registration: PB-18
- Website: gurdaspur.nic.in

Hassanpur Kalan is a village in Batala in Gurdaspur district of Punjab State, India. It is located 9 kilometres (5.6 mi) from sub district headquarter, 44 kilometres (27 mi) from district headquarter and 5 kilometres (3.1 mi) from Sri Hargobindpur. The village is administrated by Sarpanch an elected representative of the village.

== Demography ==
As of 2011, the village has a total number of 222 houses and a population of 1337 of which 684 are males while 653 are females. According to the report published by Census India in 2011, out of the total population of the village 182 people are from Schedule Caste and the village does not have any Schedule Tribe population so far.

== See also ==
- List of villages in India
