= Langarwal =

- Village
- Country: India
- State: Punjab
- District: Gurdaspur
- Tehsil: Batala
- Region: Majha

Government
  - Type: Panchayat raj
  - Body: Gram panchayat

Area
  - Total: 151 ha (370 acres)

Population (2011)
  - Total: 874; 444/430 ♂/♀
  - Scheduled Castes: 276; 145/131 ♂/♀
  - Total Households: 161

Languages
  - Official: Punjabi
- Time zone: UTC+5:30 (IST)
- Telephone: 01871
- ISO 3166 code: IN-PB
- Vehicle registration: PB-18
- Website: gurdaspur.nic.in

Langarwal is a village in Batala in Gurdaspur district of Punjab State, India. It is located 16 kilometres (9.9 mi) from sub district headquarter, 38 kilometres (24 mi) from district headquarter and 10 kilometres (6.2 mi) from Sri Hargobindpur. The village is administrated by Sarpanch an elected representative of the village.

== Demography ==
As of 2011, the village has a total number of 161 houses and a population of 874 of which 444 are males while 430 are females. According to the report published by Census India in 2011, out of the total population of the village 276 people are from Schedule Caste and the village does not have any Schedule Tribe population so far.

== See also ==
- List of villages in India
