= Gande ke =

- Village
- Interactive map of Gande ke
- Coordinates: 31°42′15.70″N 75°18′50.69″E
- Country: India
- State: Punjab
- District: Gurdaspur
- Tehsil: Batala
- Region: Majha

Government
  - Type: Panchayat raj
  - Body: Gram panchayat

Area
  - Total: 222 ha (550 acres)

Population (2011)
  - Total: 1,219; 629/590 ♂/♀
  - Scheduled Castes: 344; 180/164 ♂/♀
  - Total Households: 210

Languages
  - Official: Punjabi
- Time zone: UTC+5:30 (IST)
- Telephone: 01871
- ISO 3166 code: IN-PB
- Vehicle registration: PB-18
- Website: gurdaspur.nic.in

Gande ke is a village in Batala in Gurdaspur district of Punjab State, India. It is located 22 kilometres (14 mi) from sub district headquarter, 60 kilometres (37 mi) from district headquarter and 19 kilometres (12 mi) from Sri Hargobindpur. The village is administrated by Sarpanch an elected representative of the village.

== Demography ==
As of 2011, the village has a total number of 210 houses and a population of 1219 of which 629 are males while 590 are females. According to the report published by Census India in 2011, out of the total population of the village 344 people are from Schedule Caste and the village does not have any Schedule Tribe population so far.

== See also ==
- List of villages in India
