= Ghanieke Bangar =

- Village
- Country: India
- State: Punjab
- District: Gurdaspur
- Tehsil: Batala
- Region: Majha

Government
  - Type: Panchayat raj
  - Body: Gram panchayat

Area
  - Total: 902 ha (2,230 acres)

Population (2011)
  - Total: 6,088; 3,229/2,859 ♂/♀
  - Scheduled Castes: 1,335; 716/619 ♂/♀
  - Total Households: 1,193

Languages
  - Official: Punjabi
- Time zone: UTC+5:30 (IST)
- Telephone: 01871
- ISO 3166 code: IN-PB
- Vehicle registration: PB-18
- Website: gurdaspur.nic.in

Ghanieke Bangar is a village in Batala in Gurdaspur district of Punjab State, India. It is located 16 kilometres (9.9 mi) from sub district headquarter, 55 kilometres (34 mi) from district headquarter and 12 kilometres (7.5 mi) from Sri Hargobindpur. The village is administrated by Sarpanch an elected representative of the village.

== Demography ==
As of 2011, the village has a total number of 1,193 houses and a population of 6,088 of which 3,229 are males while 2,859 are females. According to the report published by Census India in 2011, out of the total population of the village 1,335 (21.93%) people are from Schedule Caste and the village does not have any Schedule Tribe population so far.

According to the 2011 census, the children below the age of six were 630 in number and made up 10.35% of the total population. Average sex ratio of the Ghanieke Banger village was 885, which was lower than the Punjab average of 895. Child sex ratio was 826, which was lower than the state average of 846.

As of 2011, the literacy rate of Ghanieke Banger was 76.46%, which was higher than the Punjab average of 75.84%. Of this, the male literacy rate was 81.31% and female literacy was 71.02%.

== Education ==
Major educational institutions in the village are:-

- Saint Francis Convent School
- Government Senior Secondary School
- Bebe Nanki Public School
- Government Primary School

== See also ==
- List of villages in India
