= Khanfatta =

- Village
- Country: India
- State: Punjab
- District: Gurdaspur
- Tehsil: Batala
- Region: Majha

Government
  - Type: Panchayat raj
  - Body: Gram panchayat

Area
  - Total: 329 ha (810 acres)

Population (2011)
  - Total: 1,107; 578/529 ♂/♀
  - Scheduled Castes: 43; 23/20 ♂/♀
  - Total Households: 216

Languages
  - Official: Punjabi
- Time zone: UTC+5:30 (IST)
- Telephone: 01871
- ISO 3166 code: IN-PB
- Vehicle registration: PB-18
- Website: gurdaspur.nic.in

Khanfatta is a village in Batala in Gurdaspur district of Punjab State, India. It is located 6 kilometres (3.7 mi) from sub district headquarter, 40 kilometres (25 mi) from district headquarter and 6 kilometres (3.7 mi) from Sri Hargobindpur. The village is administrated by Sarpanch an elected representative of the village.

== Demography ==
As of 2011, the village has a total number of 216 houses and a population of 1107 of which 578 are males while 529 are females. According to the report published by Census India in 2011, out of the total population of the village 43 people are from Schedule Caste and the village does not have any Schedule Tribe population so far.

== See also ==
- List of villages in India
