= Ror Khaira =

- Village
- Country: India
- State: Punjab
- District: Gurdaspur
- Tehsil: Batala
- Region: Majha

Government
  - Type: Panchayat raj
  - Body: Gram panchayat

Area
  - Total: 193 ha (480 acres)

Population (2011)
  - Total: 1,473; 756/717 ♂/♀
  - Scheduled Castes: 356; 179/177 ♂/♀
  - Total Households: 297

Languages
  - Official: Punjabi
- Time zone: UTC+5:30 (IST)
- Telephone: 01871
- ISO 3166 code: IN-PB
- Vehicle registration: PB-18
- Website: gurdaspur.nic.in

Ror Khaira is a village in Batala in Gurdaspur district of Punjab State, India. It is located 13 kilometres (8.1 mi) from sub district headquarter, 36 kilometres (22 mi) from district headquarter and 13 kilometres (8.1 mi) from Sri Hargobindpur. The village is administrated by Sarpanch an elected representative of the village.

== Demography ==
As of 2011, the village has a total number of 297 houses and a population of 1473 of which 756 are males while 717 are females. According to the report published by Census India in 2011, out of the total population of the village 356 people are from Schedule Caste and the village does not have any Schedule Tribe population so far.

== See also ==
- List of villages in India
