= Lala Nangal =

Coordinates: 31°54′N 74°58′E

- Village
- Interactive map of Lala Nangal
- Country: India
- State: Punjab
- District: Gurdaspur
- Tehsil: Batala
- Region: Majha

Government
  - Type: Panchayat raj
  - Body: Gram panchayat

Area
  - Total: 51 ha (130 acres)

Population (2011)
  - Total: 436; 229/207 ♂/♀
  - Scheduled Castes: 7; 3/4 ♂/♀
  - Total Households: 79

Languages
  - Official: Punjabi
- Time zone: UTC+5:30 (IST)
- Telephone: 01871
- ISO 3166 code: IN-PB
- Vehicle registration: PB-18
- Website: gurdaspur.nic.in

Lala Nangal is a village in Batala in Gurdaspur district of Punjab State, India. It is located 28 kilometres (17 mi) from sub district headquarter, 64 kilometres (40 mi) from district headquarter and 8 kilometres (5.0 mi) from Sri Hargobindpur. The village is administrated by Sarpanch an elected representative of the village.

== Demography ==
As of 2011, the village has a total number of 79 houses and a population of 436 of which 229 are males while 207 are females. According to the report published by Census India in 2011, out of the total population of the village 7 people are from Schedule Caste and the village does not have any Schedule Tribe population so far.

== See also ==
- List of villages in India
