= Gillanwali =

Village in Batala tehsil, Punjab, India

- Village
- Country: India
- State: Punjab
- District: Gurdaspur
- Tehsil: Batala
- Region: Majha

Government
  - Type: Panchayat raj
  - Body: Gram panchayat

Area
  - Total: 106 ha (260 acres)

Population (2011)
  - Total: 1,000; 537/463 ♂/♀
  - Scheduled Castes: 110; 55/55 ♂/♀
  - Total Households: 197

Languages
  - Official: Punjabi
- Time zone: UTC+5:30 (IST)
- Telephone: 01871
- ISO 3166 code: IN-PB
- Vehicle registration: PB-18
- Website: gurdaspur.nic.in

Gillanwali is a village in Batala in Gurdaspur district of Punjab State, India. It is located 5 kilometres (3.1 mi) from sub district headquarter, 26 kilometres (16 mi) from district headquarter and 5 kilometres (3.1 mi) from Sri Hargobindpur. The village is administrated by Sarpanch an elected representative of the village. There is another village with the same name in the district, which is situated in the Dera Baba Nanak Tehsil, near a town called Dhianpur.

== Demography ==
As of 2011, the village has a total number of 197 houses and a population of 1000 of which 537 are males while 463 are females. According to the report published by Census India in 2011, out of the total population of the village 110 people are from Schedule Caste and the village does not have any Schedule Tribe population so far.

== See also ==
- List of villages in India
