= Alisher, Punjab =

Village in Punjab, India

Alisher
- ਅਲੀਸ਼ੇਰ
- Interactive map of Alisher
- Coordinates: 32°1′11″N 75°16′21″E
- Country: India
- State: Punjab
- District: Gurdaspur

Population (2011)
  - Total: 592

Alisher Village is located in Pathankot tehsil in district Gurdaspur, in the Indian state of Punjab. It is 13 km from the district headquarters in Pathankot. Alisher village is also a Gram panchayat.

Its population is 592 people, of which 332 are males and 260 are females. Its pin code is 143519.
