= Leel Khurd =

- Village
- Country: India
- State: Punjab
- District: Gurdaspur
- Tehsil: Batala
- Region: Majha

Government
  - Type: Panchayat raj
  - Body: Gram panchayat

Area
  - Total: 96 ha (240 acres)

Population (2011)
  - Total: 773; 414/359 ♂/♀
  - Scheduled Castes: 244; 130/114 ♂/♀
  - Total Households: 152

Languages
  - Official: Punjabi
- Time zone: UTC+5:30 (IST)
- Telephone: 01871
- ISO 3166 code: IN-PB
- Vehicle registration: PB-18
- Website: gurdaspur.nic.in

Leel Khurd is a village in Batala in Gurdaspur district of Punjab State, India. It is located 10 kilometres (6.2 mi) from sub district headquarter, 40 kilometres (25 mi) from district headquarter and 9 kilometres (5.6 mi) from Sri Hargobindpur. The village is administrated by Sarpanch an elected representative of the village.

== Demography ==
As of 2011, the village has a total number of 152 houses and a population of 773 of which 414 are males while 359 are females. According to the report published by Census India in 2011, out of the total population of the village 244 people are from Schedule Caste and the village does not have any Schedule Tribe population so far.

== See also ==
- List of villages in India
