= Kot Karam Chand =

- Village
- Country: India
- State: Punjab
- District: Gurdaspur
- Tehsil: Batala
- Region: Majha

Government
  - Type: Panchayat raj
  - Body: Gram panchayat

Area
  - Total: 136 ha (340 acres)

Population (2011)
  - Total: 619; 331/288 ♂/♀
  - Scheduled Castes: 82; 49/33 ♂/♀
  - Total Households: 124

Languages
  - Official: Punjabi
- Time zone: UTC+5:30 (IST)
- Telephone: 01871
- ISO 3166 code: IN-PB
- Vehicle registration: PB-18
- Website: gurdaspur.nic.in

Kot Karam Chand is a village in Batala in Gurdaspur district of Punjab State, India. It is located 7 kilometres (4.3 mi) from sub district headquarter, 45 kilometres (28 mi) from district headquarter and 7 kilometres (4.3 mi) from Sri Hargobindpur. The village is administrated by Sarpanch an elected representative of the village.

== Demography ==
As of 2011, the village has a total number of 124 houses and a population of 619 of which 331 are males while 288 are females. According to the report published by Census India in 2011, out of the total population of the village 82 people are from Schedule Caste and the village does not have any Schedule Tribe population so far.

== See also ==
- List of villages in India
