= Khusar Tahli =

- Village
- Country: India
- State: Punjab
- District: Gurdaspur
- Tehsil: Batala
- Region: Majha

Government
  - Type: Panchayat raj
  - Body: Gram panchayat

Area
  - Total: 99 ha (240 acres)

Population (2011)
  - Total: 533; 268/265 ♂/♀
  - Scheduled Castes: 194; 98/96 ♂/♀
  - Total Households: 103

Languages
  - Official: Punjabi
- Time zone: UTC+5:30 (IST)
- Telephone: 01871
- ISO 3166 code: IN-PB
- Vehicle registration: PB-18
- Website: gurdaspur.nic.in

Khusar Tahli is a village in Batala in Gurdaspur district of Punjab State, India. It is located 31 kilometres (19 mi) from sub district headquarter, 40 kilometres (25 mi) from district headquarter and 10 kilometres (6.2 mi) from Sri Hargobindpur. The village is administrated by Sarpanch an elected representative of the village.

== Demography ==
As of 2011, the village has a total number of 103 houses and a population of 533 of which 268 are males while 265 are females. According to the report published by Census India in 2011, out of the total population of the village 194 people are from Schedule Caste and the village does not have any Schedule Tribe population so far.

== See also ==
- List of villages in India
