= Kotli Lehal =

- Village
- Country: India
- State: Punjab
- District: Gurdaspur
- Tehsil: Batala
- Region: Riarki

Government
  - Type: Panchayat raj
  - Body: Gram panchayat

Area
  - Total: 243 ha (600 acres)

Population (2011)
  - Total: 999; 509/490 ♂/♀
  - Scheduled Castes: 303; 141/162 ♂/♀
  - Total Households: 196

Languages
  - Official: Punjabi
- Time zone: UTC+5:30 (IST)
- Telephone: 01871
- ISO 3166 code: IN-PB
- Vehicle registration: PB-18
- Website: gurdaspur.nic.in

Kotli Lehal is a village in Batala in Gurdaspur district of Punjab State, India. It is located 30 kilometres (19 mi) from the sub-district headquarters, 75 kilometres (47 mi) from district headquarters, and 16 kilometres (9.9 mi) from Sri Hargobindpur. The village is administrated by a sarpanch, an elected representative of the village.

== Demography ==
As of 2011, the village has a total population of 999 (subdivided into 196 houses), of which 509 are male and 490 are female. According to a report published by Census India in 2011, out of the total population of the village, 303 people are from Scheduled Castes; the village did not have any Scheduled Tribes populations at that time.

== See also ==
- List of villages in India
