= Gujjarpura =

- Village
- Country: India
- State: Punjab
- District: Gurdaspur
- Tehsil: Batala
- Region: Majha

Government
  - Type: Panchayat raj
  - Body: Gram panchayat

Area
  - Total: 359 ha (890 acres)

Population (2011)
  - Total: 1,404; 765/639 ♂/♀
  - Scheduled Castes: 654; 381/273 ♂/♀
  - Total Households: 284

Languages
  - Official: Punjabi
- Time zone: UTC+5:30 (IST)
- Telephone: 01871
- ISO 3166 code: IN-PB
- Vehicle registration: PB-18
- Website: gurdaspur.nic.in

Gujjarpura is a village in Batala in Gurdaspur district of Punjab State, India. It is located 14 kilometres (8.7 mi) from sub district headquarter, 42 kilometres (26 mi) from district headquarter and 10 kilometres (6.2 mi) from Sri Hargobindpur. The village is administrated by Sarpanch, an elected representative of the village.

== Demography ==
As of 2011, the village has a total number of 284 houses and a population of 1404, of which 765 are males while 639 are females. According to the report published by Census India in 2011, out of the total population of the village 654 people are from Schedule Caste and the village does not have any Schedule Tribe population so far.

== See also ==
- List of villages in India
- Batala
