= Khokharwal =

Coordinates: 31°44′N 75°29′E

- Village
- Interactive map of Khokharwal
- Country: India
- State: Punjab
- District: Gurdaspur
- Tehsil: Batala
- Region: Majha

Government
  - Type: Panchayat raj
  - Body: Gram panchayat

Area
  - Total: 293 ha (720 acres)

Population (2011)
  - Total: 1,005; 534/471 ♂/♀
  - Scheduled Castes: 248; 136/112 ♂/♀
  - Total Households: 198

Languages
  - Official: Punjabi
- Time zone: UTC+5:30 (IST)
- Telephone: 01871
- ISO 3166 code: IN-PB
- Vehicle registration: PB-18
- Website: gurdaspur.nic.in

Khokharwal is a village in Batala in Gurdaspur district of Punjab State, India. It is located 35 kilometres (22 mi) from sub district headquarter, 37 kilometres (23 mi) from district headquarter and 8 kilometres (5.0 mi) from Sri Hargobindpur. The village is administrated by Sarpanch an elected representative of the village.

== Demography ==
As of 2011, the village has a total number of 198 houses and a population of 1005 of which 534 are males while 471 are females. According to the report published by Census India in 2011, out of the total population of the village 248 people are from Schedule Caste and the village does not have any Schedule Tribe population so far. The two canals passes through the village. It has a lot of bird diversity. India's national bird peacock is also found here in large numbers. It has one primary school. It has two bus stops on the different sides of village. Road condition is very bad in this village. The sewage system and drainage system is very poor in this village. No any sarpanch is giving attention to these issues in spite of getting monetary grants. Waste disposal is another issue here. Connectivity to main cities is very less. No any direct bus service is there. Only one private bus go through the village that too only once in day. Mostly it's is concerning issue for the old people or who cannot drive. Local buses should be there to connect the village to the main road. Even from main road connectivity is very less to big cities like Gurdaspur. Private buses facility is there that too on selected time hours. The nearest government health facility is chc Bham and Rh shrihargobindpur.

== Notable monuments ==
Gurdwara sadhuana sahib ji is the major attraction of Khokharwal village. Many devotees visit here on weekends. It is located in the center of village.

- List of villages in India
