= Jauhal =

- Village
- Country: India
- State: Punjab
- District: Gurdaspur
- Tehsil: Batala
- Region: Majha

Government
  - Type: Panchayat raj
  - Body: Gram panchayat

Area
  - Total: 99 ha (240 acres)

Population (2011)
  - Total: 161; 79/82 ♂/♀
  - Scheduled Castes: 0; 0/0 ♂/♀
  - Total Households: 32

Languages
  - Official: Punjabi
- Time zone: UTC+5:30 (IST)
- Telephone: 01871
- ISO 3166 code: IN-PB
- Vehicle registration: PB-18
- Website: gurdaspur.nic.in

Jauhal is a village in Batala in Gurdaspur district of Punjab State, India. It is located 21 kilometres (13 mi) from sub district headquarter, 55 kilometres (34 mi) from district headquarter and 14 kilometres (8.7 mi) from Sri Hargobindpur. The village is administrated by Sarpanch an elected representative of the village.

== Demography ==
As of 2011, the village has a total number of 32 houses and a population of 161 of which 79 are males while 82 are females. According to the report published by Census India in 2011, out of the total population of the village 0 people are from Schedule Caste and the village does not have any Schedule Tribe population so far.

== See also ==
- List of villages in India
