= Karnaman =

Coordinates: 31°46′N 75°17′E

- Village
- Interactive map of Karnaman
- Country: India
- State: Punjab
- District: Gurdaspur
- Tehsil: Batala
- Region: Majha

Government
  - Type: Panchayat raj
  - Body: Gram panchayat

Area
  - Total: 152 ha (380 acres)

Population (2011)
  - Total: 735; 391/344 ♂/♀
  - Scheduled Castes: 47; 23/24 ♂/♀
  - Total Households: 143

Languages
  - Official: Punjabi
- Time zone: UTC+5:30 (IST)
- Telephone: 01871
- ISO 3166 code: IN-PB
- Vehicle registration: PB-18
- Website: gurdaspur.nic.in

Karnaman is a village in Batala in Gurdaspur district of Punjab State, India. It is located 14 kilometres (8.7 mi) from sub district headquarter, 49 kilometres (30 mi) from district headquarter and 8 kilometres (5.0 mi) from Sri Hargobindpur. The village is administrated by a Sarpanch, an elected representative of the village.

== Demography ==
As of 2011, the village has a total number of 143 houses and a population of 735 of which 391 are males while 344 are females. According to the report published by Census India in 2011, out of the total population of the village 47 people are from Schedule Caste and the village does not have any Schedule Tribe population so far.

== See also ==
- List of villages in India
