= Lodhi Nangal =

- Village
- Country: India
- State: Punjab
- District: Gurdaspur
- Tehsil: Batala
- Region: Majha

Government
  - Type: Panchayat raj
  - Body: Gram panchayat

Area
  - Total: 160 ha (400 acres)

Population (2011)
  - Total: 679; 354/325 ♂/♀
  - Scheduled Castes: 104; 47/57 ♂/♀
  - Total Households: 127

Languages
  - Official: Punjabi
- Time zone: UTC+5:30 (IST)
- Telephone: 01871
- ISO 3166 code: IN-PB
- Vehicle registration: PB-18
- Website: gurdaspur.nic.in

Lodhi Nangal is a village in Batala in Gurdaspur district of Punjab State, India. It is located 25 kilometres (16 mi) from sub district headquarter, 60 kilometres (37 mi) from district headquarter and 6 kilometres (3.7 mi) from Sri Hargobindpur. The village is administrated by Sarpanch an elected representative of the village.

== Demography ==
As of 2011, the village has a total number of 127 houses and a population of 679 of which 354 are males while 325 are females. According to the report published by Census India in 2011, out of the total population of the village 104 people are from Schedule Caste and the village does not have any Schedule Tribe population so far.

== See also ==
- List of villages in India
