= Dult =

- Village
- Country: India
- State: Punjab
- District: Gurdaspur
- Tehsil: Batala
- Region: Majha

Government
  - Type: Panchayat raj
  - Body: Gram panchayat

Area
  - Total: 159 ha (390 acres)

Population (2011)
  - Total: 925; 474/451 ♂/♀
  - Scheduled Castes: 325; 169/156 ♂/♀
  - Total Households: 167

Languages
  - Official: Punjabi
- Time zone: UTC+5:30 (IST)
- Postal code: 143513
- Telephone: 01871
- ISO 3166 code: IN-PB
- Vehicle registration: PB-18
- Website: gurdaspur.nic.in

Dult is a village in Batala in Gurdaspur district of Punjab State, India. It is located 16 kilometres (9.9 mi) from sub district headquarter, 48 kilometres (30 mi) from district headquarter and 16 kilometres (9.9 mi) from Sri Hargobindpur. The village is administrated by Sarpanch an elected representative of the village. Near Nanak Chak

== Demography ==
As of 2011, the village has a total number of 167 houses and a population of 925 of which 474 are males while 451 are females. According to the report published by Census India in 2011, out of the total population of the village 325 people are from Schedule Caste and the village does not have any Schedule Tribe population so far.

== See also ==
- List of villages in India
