= Duniya Sandhu =

- Village
- Interactive map of Duniya Sandhu
- Coordinates: 31°48′09.30″N 75°18′32.54″E
- Country: India
- State: Punjab
- District: Gurdaspur
- Tehsil: Batala
- Region: Majha

Government
  - Type: Panchayat raj
  - Body: Gram panchayat

Area
  - Total: 441 ha (1,090 acres)

Population (2011)
  - Total: 1,528; 785/743 ♂/♀
  - Scheduled Castes: 398; 201/197 ♂/♀
  - Total Households: 290

Languages
  - Official: Punjabi
- Time zone: UTC+5:30 (IST)
- Telephone: 01871
- ISO 3166 code: IN-PB
- Vehicle registration: PB-18
- Website: gurdaspur.nic.in

Duniya Sandhu is a village in Batala in Gurdaspur district of Punjab State, India. It is located 10 kilometres (6.2 mi) from sub district headquarter, 40 kilometres (25 mi) from district headquarter and 10 kilometres (6.2 mi) from Sri Hargobindpur. The village is administrated by Sarpanch an elected representative of the village.

== Demography ==
As of 2011, the village has a total number of 290 houses and a population of 1528 of which 785 are males while 743 are females. According to the report published by Census India in 2011, out of the total population of the village 398 people are from Schedule Caste and the village does not have any Schedule Tribe population so far.

== See also ==
- List of villages in India
