= Pejo Chak =

Coordinates: 31°41′N 75°25′E

- Village
- Interactive map of Pejo Chak
- Country: India
- State: Punjab
- District: Gurdaspur
- Tehsil: Batala
- Region: Majha

Government
  - Type: Panchayat raj
  - Body: Gram panchayat

Area
  - Total: 197 ha (490 acres)

Population (2011)
  - Total: 1,216; 634/582 ♂/♀
  - Scheduled Castes: 319; 162/157 ♂/♀
  - Total Households: 253

Languages
  - Official: Punjabi
- Time zone: UTC+5:30 (IST)
- Telephone: 01871
- ISO 3166 code: IN-PB
- Vehicle registration: PB-18
- Website: gurdaspur.nic.in

Pejo Chak is a village in Batala in Gurdaspur district of Punjab State, India. It is located 35 kilometres (22 mi) from sub district headquarter, 45 kilometres (28 mi) from district headquarter and 3 kilometres (1.9 mi) from Sri Hargobindpur. The village is administrated by Sarpanch an elected representative of the village.

== Demography ==
As of 2011, the village has a total number of 253 houses and a population of 1216 of which 634 are males while 582 are females. According to the report published by Census India in 2011, out of the total population of the village 319 people are from Schedule Caste and the village does not have any Schedule Tribe population so far.

== See also ==
- List of villages in India
