= Kotli Bhan Singh =

- Village
- Country: India
- State: Punjab
- District: Gurdaspur
- Tehsil: Batala
- Region: Majha

Government
  - Type: Panchayat raj
  - Body: Gram panchayat

Area
  - Total: 141 ha (350 acres)

Population (2011)
  - Total: 1,082; 556/526 ♂/♀
  - Scheduled Castes: 526; 276/250 ♂/♀
  - Total Households: 221

Languages
  - Official: Punjabi
- Time zone: UTC+5:30 (IST)
- Telephone: 01871
- ISO 3166 code: IN-PB
- Vehicle registration: PB-18
- Website: gurdaspur.nic.in

Kotli Bhan Singh is a village in Batala in Gurdaspur district of Punjab State, India. It is located 7 kilometres (4.3 mi) from sub district headquarter, 30 kilometres (19 mi) from district headquarter and 7 kilometres (4.3 mi) from Sri Hargobindpur. The village is administrated by Sarpanch an elected representative of the village.

== Demography ==
As of 2011, the village has a total number of 221 houses and a population of 1082 of which 556 are males while 526 are females. According to the report published by Census India in 2011, out of the total population of the village 526 people are from Schedule Caste and the village does not have any Schedule Tribe population so far.

== See also ==
- List of villages in India
