= Khode Bangar =

- Village
- Country: India
- State: Punjab
- District: Gurdaspur
- Tehsil: Batala
- Region: Majha

Government
  - Type: Panchayat raj
  - Body: Gram panchayat

Area
  - Total: 101 ha (250 acres)

Population (2011)
  - Total: 659; 343/316 ♂/♀
  - Scheduled Castes: 210; 116/94 ♂/♀
  - Total Households: 111

Languages
  - Official: Punjabi
- Time zone: UTC+5:30 (IST)
- Telephone: 01871
- ISO 3166 code: IN-PB
- Vehicle registration: PB-18
- Website: gurdaspur.nic.in

Khode Bangar is a village in Batala in Gurdaspur district of Punjab State, India. It is located 28 kilometres (17 mi) from sub-district headquarters, 60 kilometres (37 mi) from district headquarters and 14 kilometres (8.7 mi) from Sri Hargobindpur. The village is administrated by Sarpanch, an elected representative of the village.

== Demography ==
As of 2011, the village has a total number of 111 houses and a population of 659 of which 343 are males while 316 are females. According to the report published by Census India in 2011, out of the total population of the village, 210 people are from Schedule Caste and the village does not have any Schedule Tribe population so far.

== See also ==
- List of villages in India
