= Hardo Jhanda =

Coordinates: 31°47′N 75°09′E

- Village
- Interactive map of Hardo Jhanda
- Country: India
- State: Punjab
- District: Gurdaspur
- Tehsil: Batala
- Region: Majha

Government
  - Type: Panchayat raj
  - Body: Gram panchayat

Area
  - Total: 307 ha (760 acres)

Population (2011)
  - Total: 2,291; 1,203/1,088 ♂/♀
  - Scheduled Castes: 1,205; 654/551 ♂/♀
  - Total Households: 437

Languages
  - Official: Punjabi
- Time zone: UTC+5:30 (IST)
- Telephone: 01871
- ISO 3166 code: IN-PB
- Vehicle registration: PB-18
- Website: gurdaspur.nic.in

Hardo Jhanda is a village in Batala in Gurdaspur district of Punjab State, India. It is located 5 kilometres (3.1 mi) from the sub district headquarters, 40 kilometres (25 mi) from the district headquarters and 3 kilometres (1.9 mi) from Sri Hargobindpur. The village is administrated by Sarpanch, an elected representative of the village.

== Demography ==
As of 2011, the village has a total number of 437 houses and a population of 2291 of which 1203 are males while 1088 are females. According to the report published by Census India in 2011, out of the total population of the village, 1205 people are from Schedule Caste and the village does not have any Schedule Tribe population so far.

== See also ==
- List of villages in India
