= Leel Kalan =

- Village
- Country: India
- State: Punjab
- District: Gurdaspur
- Tehsil: Batala
- Region: Majha

Government
  - Type: Panchayat raj
  - Body: Gram panchayat

Area
  - Total: 371 ha (920 acres)

Population (2011)
  - Total: 2,531; 1,280/1,251 ♂/♀
  - Scheduled Castes: 740; 375/365 ♂/♀
  - Total Households: 453

Languages
  - Official: Punjabi
- Time zone: UTC+5:30 (IST)
- Telephone: 01871
- ISO 3166 code: IN-PB
- Vehicle registration: PB-18
- Website: gurdaspur.nic.in

Leel Kalan is a village in Batala in Gurdaspur district of Punjab State, India. It is located 18 kilometres (11 mi) from sub district headquarter, 36 kilometres (22 mi) from district headquarter and 3 kilometres (1.9 mi) from Sri Hargobindpur. The village is administrated by Sarpanch an elected representative of the village.

== Demography ==
As of 2011, the village had a total number of 453 houses and a population of 2531, of which 1280 were males and 1251 were females. According to the report published by Census India in 2011, out of the total population of the village 740 people were from Schedule Caste and the village does not have any Schedule Tribe population so far.

== See also ==
- List of villages in India
