= Kotli Thablan =

- Village
- Country: India
- State: Punjab
- District: Gurdaspur
- Tehsil: Batala
- Region: Majha

Government
  - Type: Panchayat raj
  - Body: Gram panchayat

Area
  - Total: 115 ha (280 acres)

Population (2011)
  - Total: 525; 271/254 ♂/♀
  - Scheduled Castes: 74; 38/36 ♂/♀
  - Total Households: 109

Languages
  - Official: Punjabi
- Time zone: UTC+5:30 (IST)
- Telephone: 01871
- ISO 3166 code: IN-PB
- Vehicle registration: PB-18
- Website: gurdaspur.nic.in

Kotli Thablan is a village in Batala in Gurdaspur district of Punjab State, India. It is located 16 kilometres (9.9 mi) from sub district headquarter, 34 kilometres (21 mi) from district headquarter and 12 kilometres (7.5 mi) from Fatehgarh Churian. The village is administrated by Sarpanch an elected representative of the village.

== Demography ==
As of 2011, the village has a total number of 109 houses and a population of 525 of which 271 are males while 254 are females. According to the report published by Census India in 2011, out of the total population of the village 74 people are from Schedule Caste and the village does not have any Schedule Tribe population so far. Sarpanch S. Ranjit Singh Thabal. No. Of Schools 1 Till 5th.

== See also ==
- List of villages in India
