= Gandhian, Punjab =

Village in Punjab, India

Gandhian village is located in Gurdaspur tehsil in Gurdaspur district, Punjab. This village is 6 km from the district headquarters in Gurdaspur.

Gandhian village is also a Gram Panchayat. Its population is 2,696, of which males are 1,386 and females are 1,310. Its literacy rate is 68.51%. Its Postal Index Number is 143531.
