= Kishan Kot =

- Village
- Country: India
- State: Punjab
- District: Gurdaspur
- Tehsil: Batala
- Region: Majha

Government
  - Type: Panchayat raj
  - Body: Gram panchayat

Area
  - Total: 85 ha (210 acres)

Population (2011)
  - Total: 782; 408/374 ♂/♀
  - Scheduled Castes: 540; 285/255 ♂/♀
  - Total Households: 160

Languages
  - Official: Punjabi
- Time zone: UTC+5:30 (IST)
- Telephone: 01871
- ISO 3166 code: IN-PB
- Vehicle registration: PB-18
- Website: gurdaspur.nic.in

Kishan Kot is a village in Batala in Gurdaspur district of Punjab State, India. It is located 5 kilometres (3.1 mi) from sub district headquarter, 45 kilometres (28 mi) from district headquarter and 4 kilometres (2.5 mi) from Sri Hargobindpur. The village is administrated by Sarpanch, an elected representative of the village.

== Demography ==
As of 2011, tvillage has a total number of 160 houses and a population of 782 of which 408 are males while 374 are females. According to the report published by Census India in 2011, out of the total population of the village 540 people are from Schedule Caste and the village does not have any Schedule Tribe population so far.

There are two temples in this village God Krishan and God Shiva. This village is famous for drivers and for combine harvester machines.
