= Mahesh Dogar =

Coordinates: 31°44′N 75°30′E

- Village
- Interactive map of Mahesh Dogar
- Country: India
- State: Punjab
- District: Gurdaspur
- Tehsil: Batala
- Region: Majha

Government
  - Type: Panchayat raj
  - Body: Gram panchayat

Area
  - Total: 505 ha (1,250 acres)

Population (2011)
  - Total: 1,966; 1,025/941 ♂/♀
  - Scheduled Castes: 581; 303/278 ♂/♀
  - Total Households: 323

Languages
  - Official: Punjabi
- Time zone: UTC+5:30 (IST)
- Telephone: 01871
- ISO 3166 code: IN-PB
- Vehicle registration: PB-18
- Website: gurdaspur.nic.in

Mahesh Dogar is a village in Batala in Gurdaspur district of Punjab State, India. It is located 35 kilometres (22 mi) from sub district headquarter, 41 kilometres (25 mi) from district headquarter and 8 kilometres (5.0 mi) from Sri Hargobindpur. The village is administrated by Sarpanch an elected representative of the village.

== Demography ==
As of 2011, the village has a total number of 323 houses and a population of 1966 of which 1025 are males while 941 are females. According to the report published by Census India in 2011, out of the total population of the village 581 people are from Schedule Caste and the village does not have any Schedule Tribe population so far.

== See also ==
- List of villages in India
