= Kotla Baja Singh =

Kotla Bazza singh
- Village
- Country: India
- State: Punjab
- District: Gurdaspur
- Tehsil: Batala
- Region: Majha

Government
  - Type: Panchayat raj
  - Body: Gram panchayat

Area
  - Total: 114 ha (280 acres)

Population (2011)
  - Total: 687; 366/321 ♂/♀
  - Scheduled Castes: 269; 146/123 ♂/♀
  - Total Households: 138

Languages
  - Official: Punjabi
- Time zone: UTC+5:30 (IST)
- Telephone: 01871
- ISO 3166 code: IN-PB
- Vehicle registration: PB-18
- Website: gurdaspur.nic.in

Kotla Bazza Singh is a village in Batala in Gurdaspur district of Punjab State, India. It is located 12 kilometres (7.5 mi) from sub district headquarter, 44 kilometres (27 mi) from district headquarter and 10 kilometres (6.2 mi) from Sri Hargobindpur.

== Demography ==
As of 2011, the village has a total number of 138 houses and a population of 687 of which 366 are males while 321 are females. According to the report published by Census India in 2011, out of the total population of the village 269 people are from Schedule Caste.

== See also ==
- List of villages in India
