= Mansurke =

Coordinates: 31°49′N 75°21′E

- Village
- Interactive map of Mansurke
- Country: India
- State: Punjab
- District: Gurdaspur
- Tehsil: Batala
- Region: Majha

Government
  - Type: Panchayat raj
  - Body: Gram panchayat

Area
  - Total: 74 ha (180 acres)

Population (2011)
  - Total: 182; 98/84 ♂/♀
  - Scheduled Castes: 22; 13/9 ♂/♀
  - Total Households: 39

Languages
  - Official: Punjabi
- Time zone: UTC+5:30 (IST)
- Telephone: 01871
- ISO 3166 code: IN-PB
- Vehicle registration: PB-18
- Website: gurdaspur.nic.in

Mansurke is a village in Batala in Gurdaspur district of Punjab State, India. It is located 16 kilometres (9.9 mi) from sub district headquarter, 32 kilometres (20 mi) from district headquarter and 2 kilometres (1.2 mi) from Sri Hargobindpur. The village is administrated by Sarpanch an elected representative of the village.

== Demography ==
As of 2011, the village has a total number of 39 houses and a population of 182 of which 98 are males while 84 are females. According to the report published by Census India in 2011, out of the total population of the village 22 people are from Schedule Caste and the village does not have any Schedule Tribe population so far.

== See also ==
- List of villages in India
