= Momanwal =

- Village
- Country: India
- State: Punjab
- District: Gurdaspur
- Tehsil: Batala
- Region: Majha

Government
  - Type: Panchayat raj
  - Body: Gram panchayat

Area
  - Total: 77 ha (190 acres)

Population (2011)
  - Total: 801; 406/395 ♂/♀
  - Scheduled Castes: 431; 222/209 ♂/♀
  - Total Households: 147

Languages
  - Official: Punjabi
- Time zone: UTC+5:30 (IST)
- Telephone: 01871
- ISO 3166 code: IN-PB
- Vehicle registration: PB-18
- Website: gurdaspur.nic.in

Momanwal is a village in Batala in Gurdaspur district of Punjab State, India. It is located 25 kilometres (16 mi) from sub district headquarter, 59 kilometres (37 mi) from district headquarter and 17 kilometres (11 mi) from Sri Hargobindpur. The village is administrated by Sarpanch an elected representative of the village.

== Demography ==
As of 2011, the village has a total number of 147 houses and a population of 801 of which 406 are males while 395 are females. According to the report published by Census India in 2011, out of the total population of the village 431 people are from Schedule Caste and the village does not have any Schedule Tribe population so far.

== See also ==
- List of villages in India
