= Kotli Dhadian =

Coordinates: 31°50′N 75°02′E

- Village
- Interactive map of Kotli Dhadian
- Country: India
- State: Punjab
- District: Gurdaspur
- Tehsil: Batala
- Region: Majha

Government
  - Type: Panchayat raj
  - Body: Gram panchayat

Area
  - Total: 129 ha (320 acres)

Population (2011)
  - Total: 990; 522/468 ♂/♀
  - Scheduled Castes: 355; 193/162 ♂/♀
  - Total Households: 179

Languages
  - Official: Punjabi
- Time zone: UTC+5:30 (IST)
- Telephone: 01871
- ISO 3166 code: IN-PB
- Vehicle registration: PB-18
- Website: gurdaspur.nic.in

Kotli Dhadian is a village in Batala in Gurdaspur district of Punjab State, India. It is located 18 kilometres (11 mi) from sub district headquarter, 53 kilometres (33 mi) from district headquarter and 10 kilometres (6.2 mi) from Sri Hargobindpur. The village is administrated by Sarpanch an elected representative of the village.

== Demography ==
As of 2011, the village has a total number of 179 houses and a population of 990 of which 522 are males while 468 are females. According to the report published by Census India in 2011, out of the total population of the village 355 people are from Schedule Caste and the village does not have any Schedule Tribe population so far.

== See also ==
- List of villages in India
