= Galowal =

- Village
- Interactive map of Galowal
- Coordinates: 31°48′18.96″N 75°34′10.65″E
- Country: India
- State: Punjab
- District: Gurdaspur
- Tehsil: Batala
- Region: Majha

Government
  - Type: Panchayat raj
  - Body: Gram panchayat

Area
  - Total: 134 ha (330 acres)

Population (2011)
  - Total: 479; 251/228 ♂/♀
  - Scheduled Castes: 133; 69/64 ♂/♀
  - Total Households: 71

Languages
  - Official: Punjabi
- Time zone: UTC+5:30 (IST)
- Telephone: 01871
- ISO 3166 code: IN-PB
- Vehicle registration: PB-18
- Website: gurdaspur.nic.in

Galowal is a village in Batala in Gurdaspur district of Punjab State, India. It is located 32 kilometres (20 mi) from sub district headquarter, 42 kilometres (26 mi) from district headquarter and 5 kilometres (3.1 mi) from Sri Hargobindpur. The village is administrated by Sarpanch an elected representative of the village.

== Demography ==
As of 2011, the village has a total number of 71 houses and a population of 479 of which 251 are males while 228 are females. According to the report published by Census India in 2011, out of the total population of the village 133 people are from Schedule Caste and the village does not have any Schedule Tribe population so far.

== See also ==
- List of villages in India
