= Gilbob =

Coordinates: 31°44′N 75°29′E

- Village
- Interactive map of Gilbob
- Country: India
- State: Punjab
- District: Gurdaspur
- Tehsil: Batala
- Region: Majha

Government
  - Type: Panchayat raj
  - Body: Gram panchayat

Area
  - Total: 209 ha (520 acres)

Population (2011)
  - Total: 507; 264/243 ♂/♀
  - Scheduled Castes: 5; 3/2 ♂/♀
  - Total Households: 85

Languages
  - Official: Punjabi
- Time zone: UTC+5:30 (IST)
- Telephone: 01871
- ISO 3166 code: IN-PB
- Vehicle registration: PB-18
- Website: gurdaspur.nic.in

Gilbob is a village in Batala in Gurdaspur district of Punjab State, India. It is located 30 kilometres (19 mi) from sub district headquarter, 32 kilometres (20 mi) from district headquarter and 9 kilometres (5.6 mi) from Sri Hargobindpur. The village is administrated by Sarpanch an elected representative of the village.

== Demography ==
As of 2011, the village has a total number of 85 houses and a population of 507 of which 264 are males while 243 are females. According to the report published by Census India in 2011, out of the total population of the village 5 people are from Schedule Caste and the village does not have any Schedule Tribe population so far.

== See also ==
- List of villages in India
