= Purana Shalla =

Village in Punjab, India

Purana Shalla is a village (tehsil) in Gurdaspur in the Indian state of Punjab.
