= Guru Ki Maseet =

Former mosque, now Sikh temple, in Gurdaspur, Punjab, India

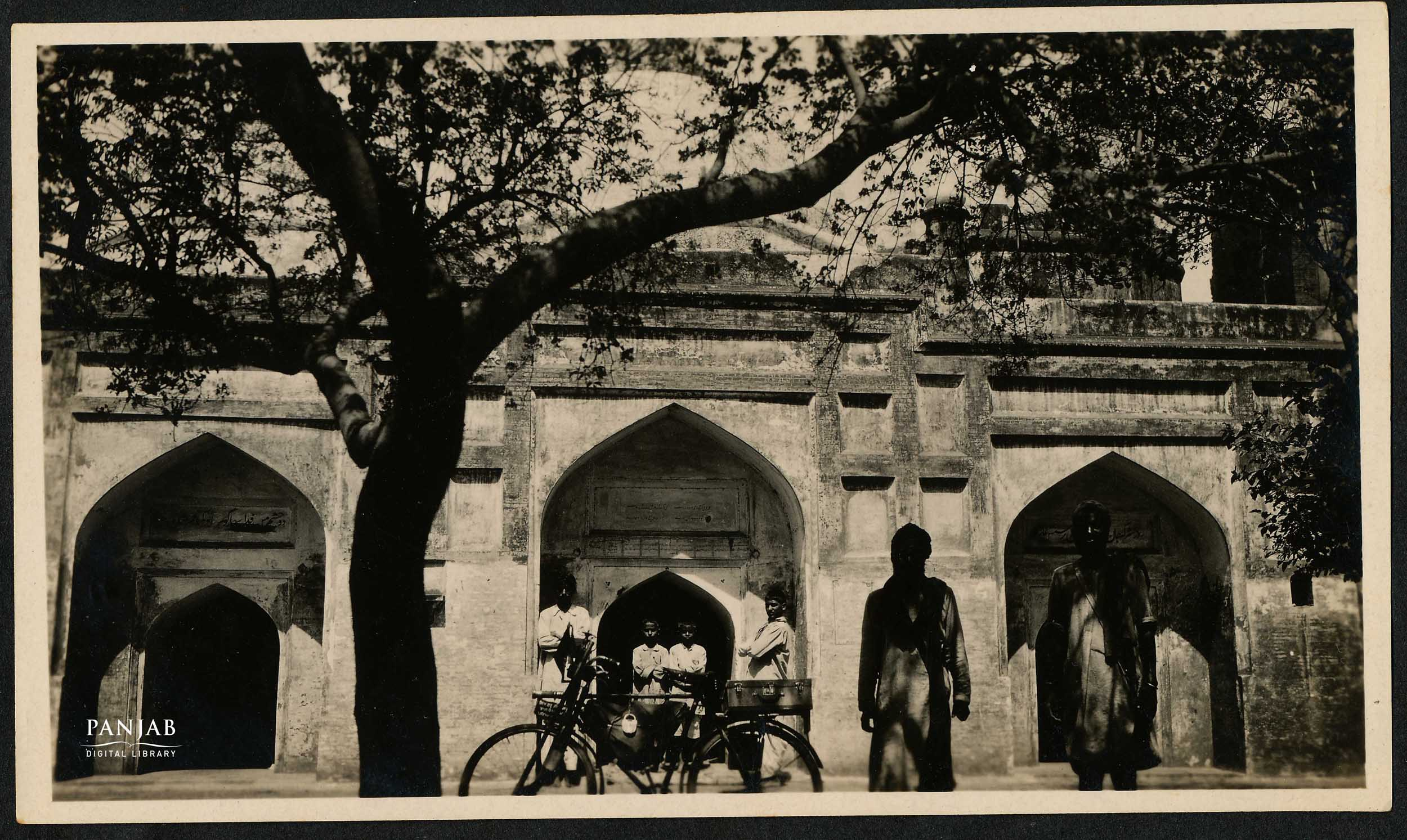
- The former mosque in 1933

- Location of the former mosque, now Sikh temple, in Punjab

Religion
- Affiliation: Islam (17th century–1947); Sikhism (since the mid-20th century)
- Ecclesiastical or organizational status: Mosque (17th century–1947); Gurdwara (since the mid-20th century)
- Status: Abandoned (as a mosque); Active (as a temple)

Location
- Location: Sri Hargobindpur, Gurdaspur Punjab
- Country: India
- Interactive map of Guru Ki Maseet
- Administration: Muslims (until 1947); Tarna Dal (current)
- Coordinates: 31°41′14.786″N 75°28′47.347″E

Architecture
- Type: Mosque architecture
- Style: Indo-Islamic
- Founder: Guru Hargobind
- Completed: 17th century

The Guru ki Maseet, also spelt as Guru kī Masīt, alternatively known in English as Guru's Mosque, is a 17th-century former mosque (Punjabi: Masīta) and, since 1947, repurposed as a Sikh gurdwara, located in Sri Hargobindpur, in the Gurdaspur district of the state of Punjab, India. The former mosque was constructed by sixth Sikh Guru, Guru Hargobind Sahib at the request of local Muslims.

== History ==
There are a few theories regarding its origin. As per Sikh accounts, Guru Hargobind had constructed a mosque in the eastern part of Sri Hargobindpur overlooking the riverbed for local Muslim settlers of the locality or for his Muslim workers, whom were artisans helping with the construction of Sri Hargobindpur. Guru Hargobind also built a dharamsāl in Sri Hargobindpur for Hindus. The mosque was actually larger than the gurdwara that had been constructed for the Sikhs of the guru. Its construction is an example of the egalitarian tenets of the Sikh faith. Another view is that it was built on top of the destroyed home of a local man who incited a battle between the Sikhs and Mughals.

In the aftermath of the partition of Punjab in 1947, the mosque lay abandoned. Nihangs took-over the complex and established a gurdwara at the site of the former mosque.

Restoration work began in 2010 by local Sikhs to renovate the structure. The conservation work was conducted by the team of Gurmit Rai of Cultural Resource Conservation.

== Architecture ==
The mosque is located outside of the original, planned core of the settlement of Sri Hargobindpur, with it being located in an area that was inhabited by artisans from lower-caste Hindu and Muslim backgrounds. The current structure is original, dating to the period of the Sikh gurus. The edifice is embellished. It has thick walls, about 1.8 metres regarding the external walls, which were built with mud-mortared brick. It is a three-bayed structure (with each bay having a dome, which are double-domes), with its eastern facade bearing three arches that are pointed. The two flanking arches are smaller than the central arch, likewise the central dome is larger than the two flanking domes. The domes are internally supported by squinches. The mosque is larger than the gurdwara constructed by the guru for the Sikhs, being large enough to house an entire congregation.

== See also ==
- Conversion of mosques into non-Islamic places of worship
- Islam in India
- List of gurdwaras in India
- List of mosques in India
- Sikhism in India
