= Rangar Nangal =

Rangar Nangal rangat mangat
- village
- Location in Punjab, India Rangar Nangal (India)
- Coordinates: 31.716632°N 75.23931°E
- Country: India
- State: Punjab
- District: Gurdaspur
- Named for: rangat mangat (place of beautiful colours)

Population
  - Total: 300

Languages
  - Official: Punjabi
- Time zone: UTC+5:30 (IST)
- Postal code: 143505
- Telephone code: 01871
- Vehicle registration: PB-06
- Nearest city: Batala

Rangar Nangal was founded by a Parmar Rajput family from Jodhpur in the Indian state of Rajasthan. The family was significant during the reign of Ranjit Singh. Katra Karam Singh in Amritsar, also known as Katra Rangar Nangalia, is named after Karam Singh, the father of a well-known general of Ranjit Singh called Arjan Singh.

It was an estate of 90 villages with Rangar Nangal Purana as its capital. It was under direct rule of Arjan Singh and then his son, Balwant Singh, the rais and zaildar. He was also divisional minister or divisional magistrate of Jalandhar division. He was married to Rani Har Kaur, daughter of Sham Singh Atariwala, who was also general to Ranjit Singh. The lack of a child from that marriage caused him then to marry a girl from the Singhpuria sardars, settled in Chahal Kalan (near Achal Sahib) he was having two sons, Hari Singh and Narain Singh. He died young and all his estate and wealth was thereafter controlled by the British administration in India under the provisions of the Court of Wards. The children were educated under British guardianship at the cambridge in London.

It is in the Gurdaspur district of Punjab, India.
