= Bagrian =

- Town
- Location in Punjab, India Bagrian (India)
- Coordinates: 30.431188°N 76.036542°E
- Country: India
- State: Punjab
- District: Sangrur

Languages
  - Official: Punjabi
- Time zone: UTC+5:30 (IST)
- PIN: 148018

Bagrian is a village located in Malerkotla District, in Punjab, India which has a significant place in Sikh history. Village is named after the famous haveli situated here.

The House of Bagrian owned much of the land and the haveli in the village, where certain important artifacts that belonged to the Sikh Gurus are kept. The Bhai Sahibs of Bagrian also run a langar that serves free food to everyone who goes there. The First Punjabi film Long Da Lishkara (1986) was filmed in this village. After that Tera Mera Ki Rishta (2009), Ekam: Son of Soil (2010), Son of Sardaar (2012), Yamla Pagla Deewana, as well as the serial Ek Veer Ki Ardaas...Veera in 2012.

== History ==
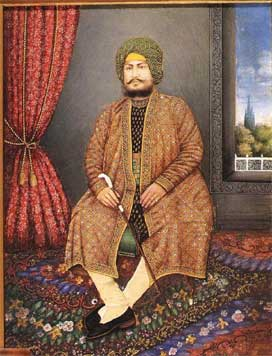
Painted photograph of Bhai Narain Singh of Bagrian, Punjab: Patiala or Bagrian, ca.1880

Situated on the Malerkotla-Nabha road, Bagrian lies about 18km southeast of Malerkotla. Though now in Malerkotla Tehsil, it was not a part of the Malerkotla Princely State but was ruled by the British Colonial authorities. Haveli was made by Guddar Singh. The village had been given to him by Adina Beg the Governor of Jalandhar city at the time, in appreciation of Bhai Guddar Singh's piety.

The Bhais still run a langar (free kitchen) daily. This tradition of langar was started from the time of Guru Hargobind, the Sixth Sikh Guru. The village also had a wide expanse of green areas.

The Bagrian state is a continuation of a tradition of religious service from the times of Bhai Rup Chand, who was blessed by the Sixth Guru in 1634.
