= Buche Nangal =

- Village
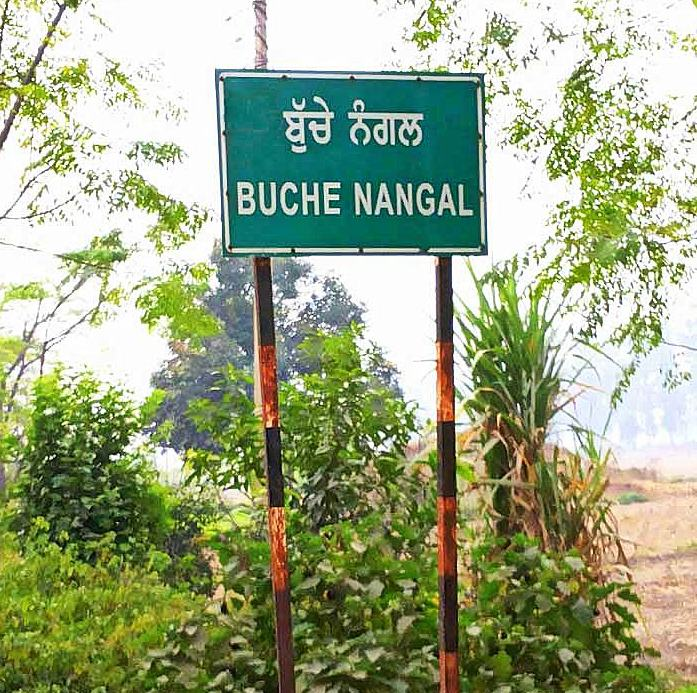

- Location in Punjab, India
- Coordinates: 31.979298°N 75.227487°E
- Country: India
- State: Punjab
- District: Gurdaspur

Languages
  - Official: Punjabi, Hindi, English
- Time zone: UTC+5:30 (IST)
- PIN: 143512
- Area code: +91 1874

Buche Nangal is a village located in the Indian state of Punjab, near Kalanaur. The name is derived from a past town chieftain, who lost his ear in a battle. Thereafter, he was known as a bucha (Punjabi: one-eared man). The name changed over time to Buche Nangal (a term for a municipal council).

== History ==
Chieftain Ram Singh was Jarnail (General) of Maharaja Ranjit Singh's Misl (Sukerchakia Misl). The people of the village moved from Chittorgarh (later Fathegarh Churrian, Punjab) and settled on Buche Nangal land. They migrated because their population was not increasing, and they believed that this was due to the place where they lived. Initially, the village was named Ram Nagar after Ram Singh. When Ram Singh lost his ear in a battle fighting for the Sukerchakia Misl under Maharaja Ranjit Singh the name changed to Buche Nangal.

== Demographics ==
The population of Buche Nangal primarily belongs to the Punjab region, with agriculture serving as the backbone of the local economy. The village is known for cultivating wheat, rice, and sugarcane. A significant portion of the residents belong to the Bandesha clan, predominantly from the Punjab Jat community.

As per the census, children aged 0–6 make up 13.45% of the total population, with 96 children in this age group. The village has an average sex ratio of 1,000, which is higher than Punjab's state average of 895. However, the child sex ratio in Buche Nangal is 714, lower than Punjab's average of 846.

Buche Nangal has a lower literacy rate compared to the state. In 2011, the village's literacy rate was 67.64%, whereas Punjab’s average was 75.84%. Male literacy in the village stood at 73.09%, while female literacy was 62.46%.

As per the Constitution of India and the Panchayati Raj Act, Buche Nangal is governed by a Sarpanch (Head of the Village), who is an elected representative responsible for local administration.

== Geography ==
Buche Nangal is a village panchayat in the Gurdaspur district of Punjab, India. It is geographically located at a latitude of 31.9826039 and a longitude of 75.2201933. The state capital, Chandigarh, is approximately 201.8 kilometers from Buche Nangal. Other nearby state capitals include Shimla (207.9 km) and Srinagar (237.7 km).

== Commerce ==
=== Development and Sources ===
- Electricity Power Substation (66 kV)
- Wheat & Rice Trading Market
- Government Agriculture Society (Fertilizer & Seeds Supplier Stock)
- Sub Post Office
- Rice Mill Factory

== Healthcare ==
=== Health Services For Human Being & Animals ===
- Dispensary
- Veterinary Hospital
- Doctor
- Medicine Shop

== Education ==
=== School ===
- Government Primary School

== Photos of village ==
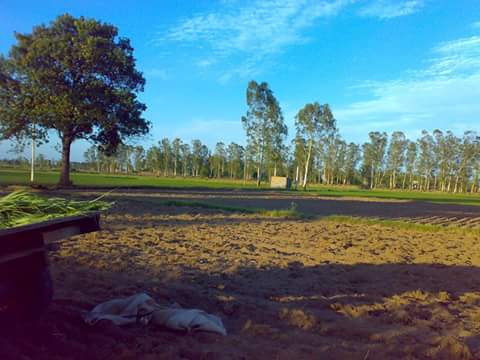

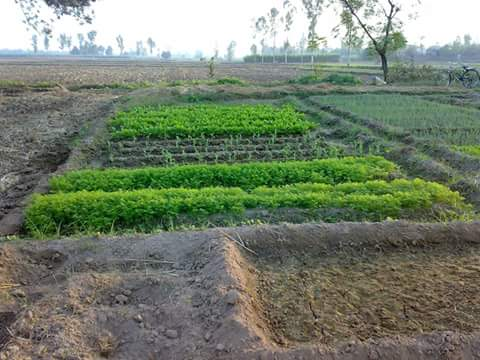

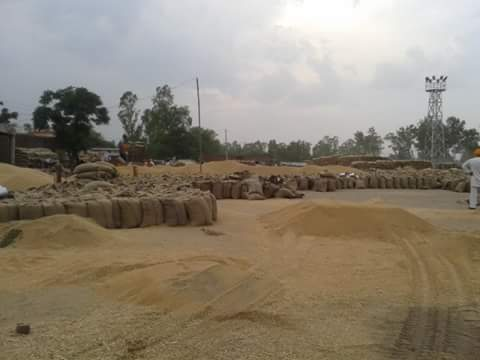

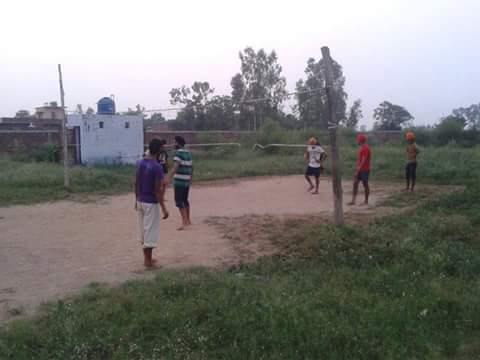
