= Dorangla =

- town
- Location in Punjab, India
- Coordinates: 32.107°N 75.306°E
- Country: India
- State: Punjab
- District: Gurdaspur

Government
  - Town head: Varinder Kumar (Ranu)

Population
  - Total: 4,247

Languages
  - Official: Punjabi
- Time zone: UTC+5:30 (IST)
- PIN: 143526
- Telephone code: 01874
- Vehicle registration: PB06

Dorangla is a town in the Gurdaspur district, Punjab state of India, near the border with Pakistan. It is about 15 km west from the district Gurdasur. The name Dorngla was given to the town on the name of a Muslim leader Daurang Khan in the Mughal era.

The town was developed during the empire of Emperor Akbar by Dorang Khan. Before the partition with Pakistan, this town had a great history of merchandise.
