= Ranjit Bagh =

- Village
- Location within India
- Coordinates: 32°04′15″N 75°26′53″E
- Country: India
- State: Punjab
- District: Gurdaspur

Population
  - Total

Ranjit Bagh is a village three miles (5 km) north of city of Gurdaspur, India on Amritsar/Pathankot GT Road. This village came into being after the India/Pakistan Partition in 1947. The East Punjab government at that time put aside 1,000 acres (4.0 km^{2}) of most fertile land around each district headquarters for horticulture so the population could have access to locally grown fruit and called these places Garden colonies.

The Garden Colony of Gurdaspur district was awarded to present site of Ranjit Bagh village. The name was chosen based on the fact that Maharaja Ranjit Singh had his mango gardens in the nearby town of Dinanagar. Hence the name Ranjit Bagh.

The original families to get title to land and settle in Ranjit Bagh were educated elite of the time. All original owners have died and are now survived by their descendants who have divided the original land holdings into small plots of land.
