= Naserke =

Human settlement in India

Coordinates: 31.8324°N 75.0579°E

Naserke is a small village in the Gurdaspur district of Punjab, India. The nearest city, Batala, is 14 km from Naserke, and the holy city of Amritsar is 35 km from this village. It falls under Fatehgarh Garh Churian block and the road connecting Batala and Fatehgarh Churian (via Bhalowali) passes through the village. Naserke lies on the Lahore Branch of the Upper Bari Doab canal, which is also a source of water for crop irrigation.

== History ==
The current residents of this village moved to this place after the partition of India and Pakistan in 1947. Before partition, Naserke was inhabited by mostly Muslim population, who moved to Pakistan after partition. There were two mosques in the village, one of which is used as gurudwara (a Sikh temple) since then. There are no Muslims in the village now.

== Demographics ==
The population of about 1100 includes mostly Sikhs. The Sikh population mainly consists of sub-castes such as Boparai, Bajwa, Kahlon and Sandhu. The village is also home to a few Christian families and Hindu families. The main occupation of the villagers is farming. Many youngsters are now moving to countries in Canada, Europe and North America in search for jobs. The main crops grown here include wheat, paddy, sugarcane, maize, pearl millet, lurcene and other forage crops.

== Facilities ==
The main facilities in the village include a government primary school, Sri Guru Harkrishen public school, a government hospital, a veterinary hospital, a cooperative bank, a post office and a grain market.
