= Gurdaspur =

Gurdaspur Gurdāspur (Punjabi)
- City
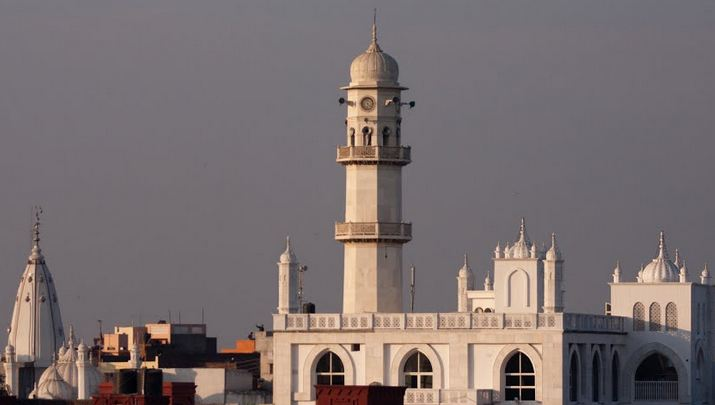
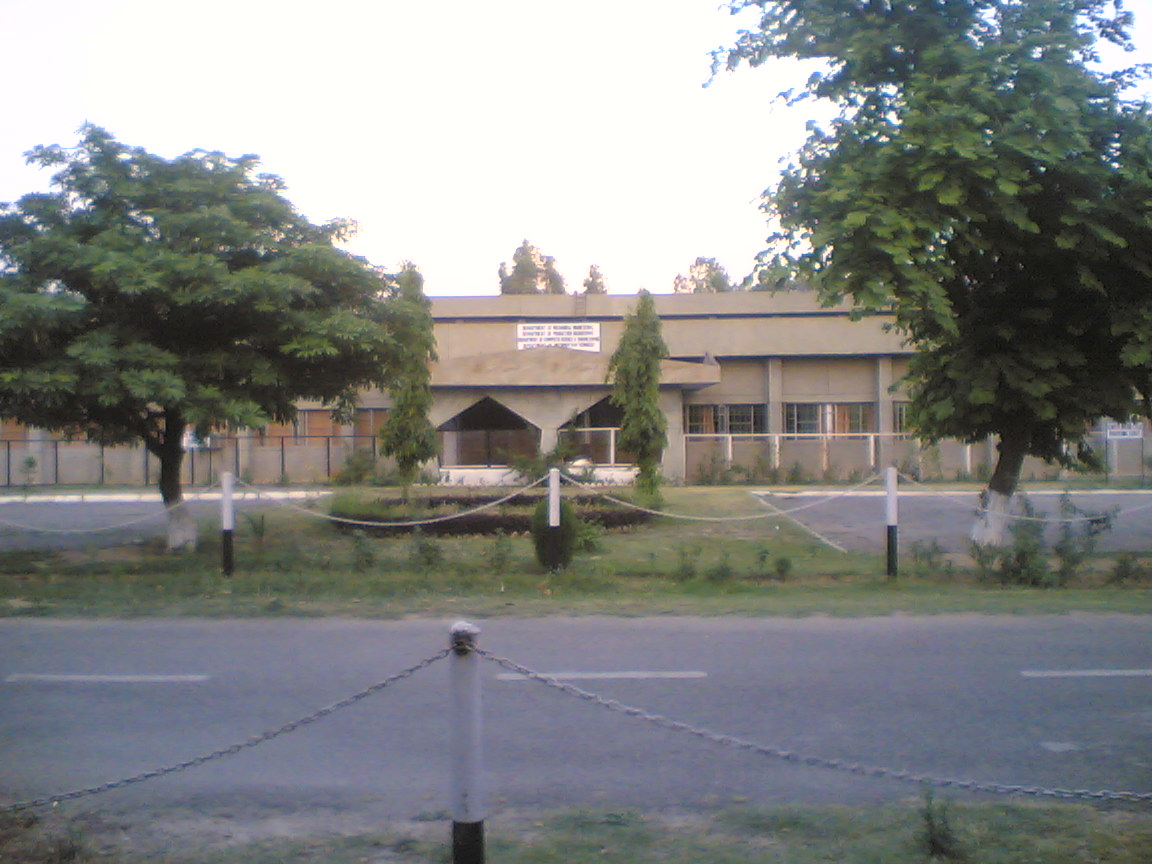
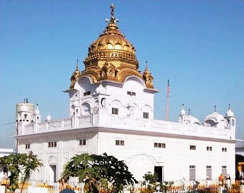
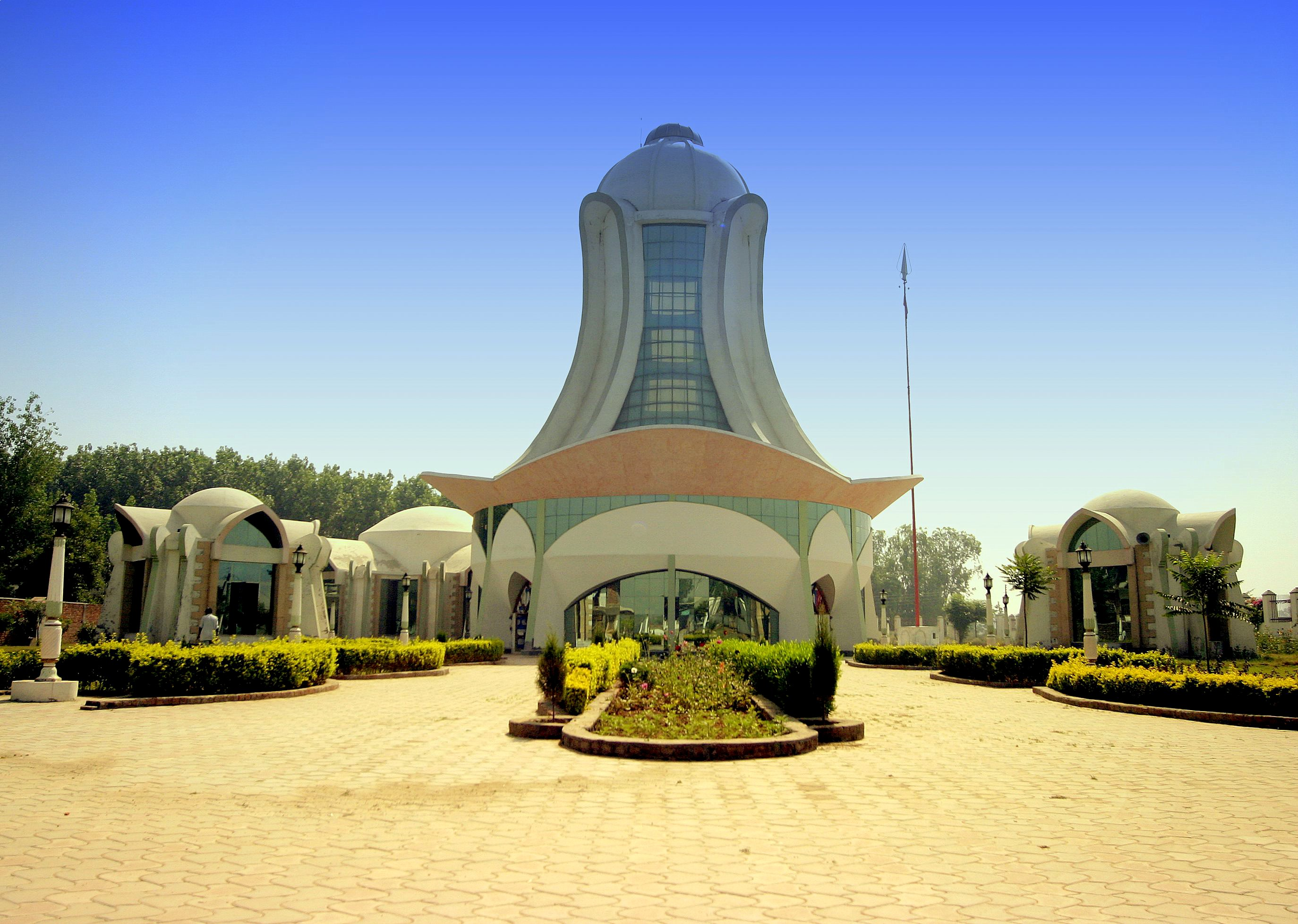
- Clockwise from top: Qadian, Dera Baba Nanak, Batala Dera Sahib, Mechanical Engg. Block

- Location within India Location within Punjab
- Coordinates: 32.0333°N 75.40°E
- Country: India
- State: Punjab
- District: Gurdaspur
- Region: Majha
- Established: 17th century
- Founder: Guriya

Government
  - Type: Municipality
  - Body: Municipal Council Gurdaspur
  - Member of the Legislative Assembly: Barindermeet Singh Pahra
  - Member of Parliament: Sukhjinder Singh Randhawa
  - Deputy Commissioner: Sh. Vishesh Sarangal, IAS

Area
  - City: 45 km^{2} (17 sq mi)
  - Rank: 5th
- Elevation: 241 m (791 ft)

Population (2015)
  - City: 120,564
  - Density: 649/km^{2} (1,680/sq mi)
  - Metro: 744,092
- Time zone: UTC+5:30 (IST)
- PIN: 143521
- Area code: +91-1874-XXX XXX
- Vehicle registration: PB-06, PB-18, PB-58, PB-99, PB-85
- Website: gurdaspur.nic.in

Gurdaspur is a city in the Majha region of the Indian state of Punjab, between the rivers Beas and Ravi. It houses the administrative headquarters of Gurdaspur District and is in the geographical centre of the district, which shares a border with Pakistan.

== Etymology ==
Gurdaspur city was named after Guriya Das.

== Demographics ==
According to the 2011 India census, Gurdaspur had a population of 2,299,026 (1,212,995 males and 1,086,031 females). There was a 9.30% increase in population compared to that of 2001. In the previous 2001 census of India, Gurdaspur District had recorded a 19.74% increase to its population compared to 1991. According to religion, Hindus made up 68.9% of the city's population, with Sikhs making up 24.8%.

The average literacy rate of Gurdaspur in 2011 was 81.10%, compared to 73.80% in 2001. The male and female literacy rates were 85.90% and 75.70%, respectively. For the 2001 census, the rates were 79.80% and 67.10% respectively. The total literate population was 1,668,339, consisting of 928,264 males and 740,075 females. Sex ratio is about 895 females per 1000 males. Population Density was 649 per square km.

Religion in Gurdaspur city
Religion	Percent
Hinduism	68.88%
Sikhism	24.82%
Christianity	5.04%
Others/Unstated	1.26%

The table below shows the population of different religious groups in Gurdaspur city and their gender ratio, as of 2011 census.

Population by religious groups in Gurdaspur city, 2011 census
Religion	Total	Female	Male	Gender ratio
Hindu	53,675	25,232	28,443	887
Sikh	19,345	9,100	10,245	888
Christian	3,931	1,837	2,094	877
Muslim	383	143	240	595
Buddhist	9	5	4	1250
Jain	75	40	35	1142
Other religions	87	42	45	933
Not stated	423	218	205	1063
Total	77,928	36,617	41,311	886

== Politics ==
The city is part of the Gurudaspur Assembly Constituency and Gurdaspur (Lok Sabha constituency).

== Education ==
Gurdaspur is home to a variety of elementary and secondary schools. The city also hosts several degree-level and engineering colleges, providing diverse educational opportunities. Among these is Beant College of Engineering and Technology, established by then-Chief Minister Beant Singh in 1995 and upgraded to a university in 2021. Additionally, the Guru Nanak Dev University Regional Campus in Gurdaspur offers education. The city is also home to the nationally accredited Institute of Hotel Management, Catering & Nutrition, recognised by the Ministry of Tourism, India.

University

- Sardar Beant Singh State University, Gurdaspur

Colleges

- Guru Nanak Dev University, Regional Campus, Gurdaspur
- Golden College of Engineering And Technology
- Government College Gurdaspur
- City Nursing College
- Sukhjinder Group Of Institutes (SGI)
- Pt Mohan Lal SD college for women
- Gurukul Degree College
- Institute of Hotel Management
- Tagore College for Education
- City Degree College, Gurdaspur

Major Schools

- Delhi Public School, Gurdaspur
- Gurdaspur Public School, Gurdaspur
- Little Flower Convent School, Gurdaspur
- Army Public School, Gurdaspur
- Doon International School, Gurdaspur
- H.R.A. Lotus School, Gurdaspur
- H.R.A. International School, Gurdaspur
- Cambridge International School Gurdaspur
- Golden Sen. Sec. School, Gurdaspur
- Sukhjinder Sen. Sec. School Gurdaspur

== Administrative towns ==
- Batala
- Qadian
- Kalanaur
- Sri Hargobindpur
- Dera Baba Nanak
- Dhariwal
- Dinanagar
- Fatehgarh Churian
- Kahnuwan

== Notable people ==
- Dev Anand (Film Actor)
- Mahbub ul Haq (Economist)
- Premchand Degra (Body builder)
- Vinod Khanna (Ex-MP)
- Vijay Anand (Filmmaker)
- Chetan Anand (Filmmaker)
- Guru Randhawa (Singer)
- Aditya Puri (Businessman)
- Gurpreet Ghuggi (Film actor)
- Shivil Kaushik (Cricketer)
- Ranjit Bawa (Singer)
- AP Dhillon (Singer)
- Romesh Sharma (Film actor)
- Preet Harpal (Singer)
- Jasbir Jassi (Singer)
- Nimrat Khaira (Singer)
- Avtar Singh (Olympic judo player)
- Gurmeet Bawa (Singer)
- Sunny Deol (MP)
- Surjit Singh (Field hockey player)
- Sunanda Sharma (Singer)
- Dilpreet Bajwa (Cricketer)

== See also ==
- Ranjit Bagh
