= Sri Hargobindpur =

- Town
- Location in Punjab, India Sri Hargobindpur (India)
- Coordinates: 31°41′24″N 75°28′30″E
- Country: India
- State: Punjab
- District: Gurdaspur

Population (2001)
  - Total: 3,993

Languages
  - Official: Punjabi
- Time zone: UTC+5:30 (IST)

Sri Hargobindpur is a town and a municipal council in Gurdaspur district in the Indian state of Punjab. Situated on the banks of the Beas River Sixth Guru of Sikhs Shri Guru Hargobind Sahib ji established this city on the land bought by his father and fifth guru, Shri Guru Arjan Dev Sahib ji, the city is also the erstwhile capital of the Ramgarhia Misl.

The Gurudwara Dhamdama Sahib stands at the site of the battle of Hargobindpur fought between Sikh forces led by Guru Hargobind and Mughal forces in 1630.

== History ==
Hargobindpur was founded by Guru Arjan, the fifth Sikh guru. The settlement contains a number of surviving buildings constructed during the period of the Sikh gurus, such as the Gurdwara Granthian, Hanuman Mandir, and Guru ki Maseet.

== Demographics ==
As of 2001 India census, Sri Har Gobind Pur had a population of 3,993. Males constitute 52% of the population and females 48%. There is an average literacy rate of 66%, higher than the national average of 59.5%: male literacy is 69%, and female literacy is 63%. 12% of the population is under 6 years of age.

The table below shows the population of different religious groups in Sri Hargobindpur city and their gender ratio, as of 2011 census.

Population by religious groups in Sri Hargobindpur city, 2011 census
Religion	Total	Female	Male	Gender ratio
Sikh	5,662	2,727	2,935	929
Hindu	2,400	1,148	1,252	916
Muslim	102	50	52	961
Christian	75	35	40	875
Buddhist	1	0	1	--
Not stated	1	0	1	--
Total	8,241	3,960	4,281	925

== Notable places ==
The oldest standing monument in the town is Guru Ki Maseet (Guru's Mosque), which was constructed by Guru Hargobind, on the request of the local Muslim population.

== Politics ==
The city is part of the Sri Hargobindpur Assembly Constituency.
